= 2022–23 FC Zürich season =

FC Zürich
2022–23 season
- President: Ancillo Canepa
- Head coach: Franco Foda (until 21 September); Genesio Colatrella (caretaker, from 23 September); Bo Henriksen (from 10 October)
- Stadium: Letzigrund
- Swiss Super League: 8th
- Swiss Cup: Round 2
- UEFA Champions League: Second qualifying round
- UEFA Europa League: Group stage
- Top goalscorer: League: Tosin Aiyegun (12); All: Tosin Aiyegun (16)
- Average home league attendance: 15,387
Home colours	Away colours	Third colours

The 2022–23 season was the 127th season in the history of FC Zürich and their sixth consecutive season in the top flight. The club are participating in the Swiss Super League, the Swiss Cup, the UEFA Champions League and the UEFA Europa League.

== Players ==
=== First-team squad ===
Note: Flags indicate national team as defined under FIFA eligibility rules; some limited exceptions apply. Players may hold more than one non-FIFA nationality.

No.	Pos.	Nation	Player
1	GK	BIH	Živko Kostadinović
2	DF	SUI	Lindrit Kamberi
3	DF	ESP	Adrià Guerrero
4	DF	SUI	Bećir Omeragić
6	DF	KOS	Fidan Aliti
7	MF	SUI	Bledian Krasniqi
8	MF	NOR	Ole Selnæs
9	FW	CRO	Ivan Santini
10	MF	SUI	Antonio Marchesano
11	FW	COD	Jonathan Okita
14	MF	NED	Carson Buschman-Dormond (on loan from Tulevik)
15	FW	BEN	Tosin Aiyegun
16	DF	GER	Marc Hornschuh

No.	Pos.	Nation	Player
17	MF	GUI	Cheick Condé
19	DF	SRB	Nikola Boranijašević
21	MF	SUI	Blerim Džemaili
22	FW	CRO	Roko Šimić (on loan from RB Salzburg)
23	MF	SUI	Fabian Rohner
24	DF	CRO	Nikola Katić
25	GK	SUI	Yanick Brecher (captain)
26	MF	SUI	Miguel Reichmuth
31	DF	KOS	Mirlind Kryeziu
32	MF	SUI	Selmin Hodza
34	GK	SUI	Gianni De Nitti
35	DF	SUI	Ilan Sauter
39	FW	GHA	Daniel Afriyie

=== Out on loan ===
Note: Flags indicate national team as defined under FIFA eligibility rules; some limited exceptions apply. Players may hold more than one non-FIFA nationality.

No.	Pos.	Nation	Player
—	DF	SUI	Silvan Wallner (at FC Wil until 30 June 2023)
—	DF	EST	Karol Mets (at FC St. Pauli until 30 June 2023)
—	MF	KOS	Donis Avdijaj (at TSV Hartberg until 30 June 2023)

No.	Pos.	Nation	Player
—	MF	SUI	Nils Reichmuth (at FC Wil until 30 June 2023)
—	MF	SUI	Stephan Seiler (at FC Winterthur until 30 June 2023)

== Pre-season and friendlies ==
Win Draw Loss

12 June 2022 Friendly	Thalwil	0–7	Zürich	Thalwil, Switzerland
17:00 CEST (UTC+2)		Report		Stadium: Sportplätze Brand II

15 June 2022 Friendly	Zürich	11–0	Baden	Hausen am Albis, Switzerland
18:30 CEST (UTC+2)	Janko 1', 25'; Rohner 21', 35', 39', 85'; Aversa 65'; Vyunnyk 71', 90+1' (pen.); Fabão 77'; Haile-Selassie 79'	Report		Stadium: Sportplatz Jonentäli

18 June 2022 Friendly	Zürich	3–2	Wil	Uitikon, Switzerland
18:00 CEST (UTC+2)	Vyunnyk 50', 55'; Marchesano 82' (pen.)		Lukembila 10'; Staubli 59'	Stadium: Sürenloh; Attendance: 864

22 June 2022 Friendly	Viktoria Köln	1–3	Zürich	St. Margrethen, Switzerland
17:30 CEST (UTC+2)	De Meester 55'	Report	Kamberi 40'; Vyunnyk 53'; Aliti 85'	Stadium: Sportanlage Rheinau

2 July 2022 Friendly	Zürich	4–1	Rheindorf Altach	Zürich, Switzerland
16:05 CEST (UTC+2)	Tosin 4', 15'; Marchesano 11'; Rohner 59'	Report	Ben-Hatira 55'	Stadium: Letzigrund; Attendance: 0

9 July 2022 Friendly	VfB Stuttgart	3–2	Zürich	Friedrichshafen, Switzerland
17:30 CEST (UTC+2)	Ahamada 58', 71'; Churlinov 68'		Gnonto 28'; Conde 79'	Stadium: Zeppelinstadion

9 December 2022 Friendly	Zürich	2–1	Dornbirn	Zürich, Switzerland
14:00 CET (UTC+1)				Stadium: Sportanlage Heerenschürli

17 December 2022 Friendly	Bayer Leverkusen	4–1	Zürich	Leverkusen, Germany
13:00 CET (UTC+1)	Diaby 38'; Wirtz 45'; Azmoun 63'; Adli 86'		Condé 64'	Stadium: BayArena; Attendance: 3,000; Referee: Nico Fuchs (Germany)

7 January 2023 Friendly	Universitatea Cluj	1–3	Zürich	Belek, Turkey
11:30 CET (UTC+1)				Stadium: Titanic Sports Center - Field 1

7 January 2023 Friendly	Schalke 04	2–2	Zürich	Belek, Turkey
13:30 CET (UTC+1)	Kozuki 52'; Terodde 57'		Katić 25'; Okita 89' (pen.)	Stadium: Titanic Sports Center - Field 1 Attendance: 500; Referee: Kemal Ögen

10 January 2023 Friendly	Hannover 96	2–2	Zürich	Belek, Turkey
13:30 CET (UTC+1)	Tresoldi 54'; Teuchert 90+2'		Aiyegun 17'; Okita 32'	Stadium: Cornelia Diamond Hotel

== Competitions ==
=== Overall record ===
Competition	First match	Last match	Starting round	Final position	Record							
Competition	First match	Last match	Starting round	Final position	Pld	W	D	L	GF	GA	GD	Win %
Swiss Super League	6 August 2022	29 May 2023	Matchday 1	8th	36	10	14	12	41	55	−14	27.78
Swiss Cup	21 August 2022	18 September 2022	Round 1	Round 2	2	1	0	1	6	3	+3	50.00
UEFA Champions League	19 July 2022	27 July 2022	Second qualifying round	Second qualifying round	2	0	1	1	4	5	−1	0.00
UEFA Europa League	4 August 2022	3 November 2022	Third qualifying round	Group stage	10	5	0	5	13	17	−4	50.00
Total					50	16	15	19	64	80	−16	32.00

Source: Soccerway

=== Swiss Super League ===
==== League table ====
Pos	Team	Pld	W	D	L	GF	GA	GD	Pts	Qualification or relegation
6	St. Gallen	36	11	12	13	66	52	+14	45	
7	Grasshopper	36	12	8	16	56	64	−8	44	
8	Zürich	36	10	14	12	41	55	−14	44	
9	Winterthur	36	8	8	20	32	66	−34	32	
10	Sion (R)	36	7	10	19	41	73	−32	31	Qualification for the relegation play-off

Source: Swiss Super League
Rules for classification: 1) Points; 2) Goal difference; 3) Goals scored; 4) Head-to-head goal difference; 5) Away goals scored; 6) Draw.
(R) Relegated

==== Results summary ====
Overall								Home						Away					
Pld	W	D	L	GF	GA	GD	Pts	W	D	L	GF	GA	GD	W	D	L	GF	GA	GD
36	10	14	12	41	55	−14	44	5	8	5	23	26	−3	5	6	7	18	29	−11

Source: soccerway

==== Results by round ====
Round	1	2	3	4	5	6	7	8	9	10	11	12	13	14	15	16	17	18	19	20	21	22	23	24	25	26	27	28	29	30	31	32	33	34	35	36
Ground	A	H	A	H	A	H	H	A	A	H	H	A	H	A	A	H	A	H	A	H	A	H	H	A	H	A	H	A	H	A	H	A	A	H	A	H
Result	L	D	L	L	D	L	L	L	D	D	D	D	L	W	L	W	D	W	W	D	W	D	D	L	W	D	D	L	W	L	D	W	D	W	W	L
Position	10	10	10	10	10	10	10	10	10	10	10	10	10	10	10	9	9	9	9	9	8	8	8	8	8	8	8	8	8	8	8	8	8	8	7	8

A = Away; H = Home; W = Win; D = Draw; L = Loss

==== Matches ====
The league fixtures were announced on 17 June 2022.

16 July 2022 1	Young Boys	4–0	Zürich	Bern
18:00 CEST	Zesiger (yellow card) 3'; Garcia (yellow card) 37'; Elia (yellow card) 37'; Sierro (yellow card) 54'; Fassnacht 62'; Itten 77'; Rieder 80'; Kanga 85'	Report	Gnonto (yellow card) 50'; Kamberi (yellow card) 61'; Rohner (yellow card) 73'	Stadium: Stadion Wankdorf; Attendance: 31,120; Referee: (Switzerland) Sandro Schärer

23 July 2022 2	Zürich	0–0	Luzern	Zürich
18:00 CEST	Džemaili (yellow card) 85'	Report	Jashari (yellow card) 44' (yellow-red card) 90+1'; Beloko (yellow card) 90'; Müller (yellow card) 90+1'	Stadium: Letzigrund; Attendance: 12,905; Referee: (Switzerland) Luca Piccolo

30 July 2022 3	St.Gallen	2–0	Zürich	St. Gallen
18:00 CEST	von Moos 20' 45+1'; Latte Lath (yellow card) 26'; Schmidt (red card) 73'	Report	Boranijašević (yellow card) 21'; Kostadinović (yellow card) 52'; Condé (yellow card) 78'; Gogia (yellow card) 87'	Stadium: Kybunpark; Attendance: 17,838; Referee: (Switzerland) Lukas Fähndrich

7 August 2022 4	Zürich	0–3	Sion	Zürich
14:15 CEST	Gnonto (yellow card) 33'; Kryeziu (yellow card) 49'; Selnæs (yellow card) 87'	Report	Grgić (yellow card) 12'; Itaitinga 57' 64'; Stojilković 68'	Stadium: Letzigrund; Attendance: 13,619; Referee: (Switzerland) Urs Schnyder

14 August 2022 5	Winterthur	1–1	Zürich	Winterthur
14:15 CEST	Rodríguez 73'; Schättin (yellow card) 80'	Report	Santini (yellow card) 37'; Džemaili (yellow card) 41'; Aliti (yellow card) 60'; Kryeziu (yellow card) 84'; Rohner 85'	Stadium: Stadion Schützenwiese; Attendance: 8,400; Referee: (Switzerland) Sandro Schärer

28 August 2022 6	Zürich	2–4	Basel	Zürich
16:30 CEST	Kryeziu (yellow card) 69'; Avdijaj (yellow card) 36'; Hornschuh (yellow card) 56'; Džemaili 90+3' (pen.)	Report	Zeqiri 23' 57'; Amdouni 53'; Males 60'; Xhaka (yellow card) 75'	Stadium: Letzigrund; Attendance: 19,111; Referee: (Switzerland) Fedayi San

3 September 2022 7	Zürich	1–2	Lugano	Zürich
20:30 CEST	Mets (yellow card) 9'; Tosin 24'; Avdijaj (yellow card) 26'; Rohner (yellow card) 60'; Selnæs (yellow card) 90'	Report	Steffen 5'; Celar (yellow card) 19'; Amoura 90'	Stadium: Letzigrund; Attendance: 10,360; Referee: (Switzerland) Alessandro Dudic

11 September 2022 8	Servette	3–2	Zürich	Lancy
14:15 CEST	Cognat 2'; Bauer 43'; Crivelli (yellow card) 75'; Douline (yellow card) 87' (goal) 90+5'	Report	Okita 21' 50' (yellow card) 55' (yellow-red card) 72'; Boranijašević (yellow card) 57'; Aliti (yellow card) 64'	Stadium: Stade de Genève; Attendance: 10,168; Referee: (Switzerland) Fedayi San

1 October 2022 9	Grasshopper	1–1	Zürich	Zürich
20:30 CEST	Bolla (yellow card) 19' (goal) 49'; Li Lei (yellow card) 42'; Tomás Ribeiro (yellow card) 47'; Dadashov (yellow card) 53'	Report	Marchesano 14'; Aliti (yellow card) 42'; Džemaili (yellow card) 69'; Santini (yellow card) 90'	Stadium: Letzigrund; Attendance: 16,974; Referee: (Switzerland) Lukas Fähndrich

9 October 2022 10	Zürich	0–0	Winterthur	Letzigrund, Zürich
16:30 CEST	Boranijašević (yellow card) 42'	Report	Arnold (yellow card) 33': Fayulu (yellow card) 62'; Buess (yellow card) 84'; Gonçalves (yellow card) 90+2'	Attendance: 15,481; Referee: (Switzerland) Luca Piccolo

16 October 2022 11	Zürich	0–0	Young Boys	Letzigrund, Zürich
16:30 CEST	Santini (yellow card) 35'	SFL summary Report	Niasse (yellow card) 21'; Fassnacht (yellow card) 63'	Attendance: 14,565; Referee: (Switzerland) Fedayi San; Assistant referees: (Switzerland) Sandro Schärer (VAR)

20 October 2022 12	Basel	0–0	Zürich	St. Jakob-Park, Basel
20:30	Ndoye (yellow card) 57'; Zeqiri (yellow card) 90+3'	SFL summary FCB report	(red card) 13' Santini; (yellow card) 45' Boranijašević; (yellow card) 67' Kamberi; (yellow card) 83' Condé; (yellow card) 90+3' Katić	Attendance: 23,241; Referee: (Switzerland) Lukas Fähndrich; Assistant referees: (Switzerland) Fedayi San (VAR)

23 October 2022 13	Zürich	1–4	Grasshopper	Letzigrund, Zürich
16:30 CEST (UTC+2)	Condé (yellow card) 23'; Rohner (red card) 63'; Selnæs (yellow card) 63'; Džemaili 90' (pen.)	SFL summary	(yellow card) 17' (goal) 30', 50' Schettine; 45+4' (yellow card) 45+5' Pusic; (yellow card) 66' (goal) 90+4' Herc; (yellow card) 86' Momoh; (yellow card) 89' Schmid	Attendance: 15,496; Referee: (Switzerland) Luca Cibelli; Assistant referees: (Switzerland) Alain Bieri (VAR); Man of the Match: Guilherme Schettine

30 October 2022 14	Sion	0–1	Zürich	Stade Tourbillon, Sion
14:15	Grgić (yellow card) 66'; Araz (yellow card) 73'; Lavanchy (yellow card) 90'; Karlen (yellow card) 90+2'; Poha (yellow card) 90+4'	SFL summary	8' Okita; (yellow card) 12' Katić; (yellow card) 36' Condé; (yellow card) 47' Tosin; (yellow card) 57' Kamberi; (yellow card) 78' Boranijašević; (yellow card) 83' Okita; (yellow card) 87' Guerrero	Attendance: 10,300; Referee: (Switzerland) Alessandro Dudic; Assistant referees: (Switzerland) Alain Bieri (VAR)

6 November 2022 15	Lugano	2–0	Zürich	Cornaredo, Lugano
16:30	Steffen 12'; Mai (yellow card) 24'; Hajdari (yellow card) 48'; Mahou (yellow card) 58' (yellow-red card) 78'; Babic (yellow card) 59'; Aliseda 71'; Saipi (yellow card) 88'	SFL summary	(yellow card) 28' Selnæs; (yellow card) 43' Marchesano; (yellow card) 47' Santini; (yellow card) 73' Brecher; (yellow card) 78' Katić; (yellow card) 88' Aliti	Attendance: 3,560; Referee: (Switzerland) Sven Wolfensberger; Assistant referees: (Switzerland) Lukas Fähndrich (VAR)

13 November 2022 16	Zürich	4–1	Servette	Letzigrund, Zürich
14:15 CET	Tosin 31' 62' 86'; Katić 50'	SFL summary Report	Stevanović (yellow card) 38' (goal) 88'	Attendance: 12,776; Referee: (Switzerland) Mirel Turkes; Assistant referees: (Switzerland) Fedayi San (VAR)

21 January 2023 17	Luzern	2–2	Zürich	Swissporarena, Luzern
18:00	Jashari (yellow card) 4'; Meyer 62'; Beka (yellow card) 69'; Beloko (yellow card) 76'; Chader 83'	SFL summary	(yellow card) 38' Guerrero; (yellow card) 61' Condé; 89' Šimić; 90+3' Šimić; (yellow card) After full-time' Džemaili	Attendance: 13,979; Referee: (Switzerland) Fedayi San

29 January 2023 18	Zürich	1–0	St. Gallen	Letzigrund, Zürich
16:30	Krasniqi (red card) 17'; Šimić (yellow card) 18'; Boranijašević (yellow card) 68'; Hornschuh 88'	SFL summary	(yellow card) 45' Alves; (yellow card) 86' Quintillà	Attendance: 14,950; Referee: (Switzerland) Luca Piccolo

5 February 2023 19	Sion	0–1	Zürich	Stade Tourbillon, Sion
14:15	Itaitinga (yellow card) 28'; Lavanchy (yellow card) 46'; Bua (yellow card) 53'; Sio (yellow card) 73'	SFL summary	(yellow card) 27' Omeragić; (yellow card) 36' Šimić; 59' Okita	Attendance: 7,600; Referee: (Switzerland) Esther Staubli; Assistant referees: (VAR) (Switzerland) Lionel Tschudi (Neuchâtel)

12 February 2023 20	Zürich	1–1	Winterthur	Letzigrund, Zürich
16:30	Aliti (yellow card) 30'; Tosin 32'; Condé (yellow card) 46'; Seiler (yellow card) 62'	SFL summary	(yellow card) 16' Ramizi; 39' Ramizi; (yellow card) 42' Schmid; (yellow card) 44' Arnold; (yellow card) 62' Lekaj; (yellow card) 90+3' Ballet	Attendance: 13,690; Referee: (Switzerland) Luca Cibelli; Assistant referees: (VAR) (Switzerland) Sascha Kever

19 February 2023 21	Grasshopper	1–2	Zürich	Letzigrund, Zürich
16:30 CET (UTC+1)	Dadashov 30' (pen.); Abrashi (yellow card) 57'; Loosli (yellow card) 86'	Report	(yellow card) 30' Katic; 66', 73' Tosin; (yellow card) 88' Condé	Attendance: 16,185; Referee: (Switzerland) Urs Schyder; Assistant referees: (VAR) (Switzerland) Esther Staubli

25 February 2023 22	Zürich	2–2	Young Boys	Letzigrund, Zürich
20:30	Okita 40'; Kryeziu (yellow card) 49'; Tosin 75'	SFL summary	57' Monteiro; 84' Fassnacht	Attendance: 15,393; Referee: (Switzerland) Lukas Fähndrich; Assistant referees: (VAR) (Switzerland) Fedayi San (Gebenstorf)

5 March 2023 23	Zürich	1–1	Servette	Letzigrund, Zürich
16:30	Aliti (yellow card) 66'; Junior Ligue 78'; Mathew (yellow card) 83'	SFL summary	(yellow card) 11' Kutesa; 73' Crivelli; (yellow card) 85' Cognat; (yellow card) 88' Rouiller	Attendance: 13,780; Referee: (Switzerland) Stefan Horisberger; Assistant referees: (VAR) (Switzerland) Sandro Schärer (Buttikon)

11 March 2023 24	Lugano	2–0	Zürich	Cornaredo, Lugano
20:30	Aliseda 22'; Steffen (yellow card) 39'; Sabbatini 45'; Hajdari (yellow card) 70'; Doumbia (yellow card) 79'; Babic (yellow card) 83'; Bislimi (yellow card) 90+4'	SFL summary	(yellow card) 5' Tosin; (yellow card) 36' Šimić; (yellow card) 90+4' Omeragić	Attendance: 4,700; Referee: (Switzerland) Esther Staubli; Assistant referees: (VAR) (Switzerland) Stefan Horisberger

18 March 2023 25	Zürich	2–1	Luzern	Letzigrund, Zürich
18:00	Tosin 32'; Condé (yellow card) 67'; Tosin 76'; Krasniqi (yellow card) 90+1'	SFL summary	21' (pen.) Meyer; (yellow card) 60' Ottiger	Attendance: 15,330; Referee: (Switzerland) Urs Schnyder; Assistant referees: (VAR) (Switzerland) Sandro Schärer (Buttikon)

26 April 2023 26	St. Gallen	2–2	Zürich	Kybunpark, St. Gallen
16:30	Guillemenot 44'; Latte Lath 51'; Stillhart (yellow card) 52'; Stergiou (yellow card) 70'; Dajaku (yellow card) 73' (yellow-red card) 90+1'	SFL summary	(yellow card) 23' Aliti; 26' Tosin; (yellow card) 36' (yellow-red card) 85' Omeragić; (yellow card) 44' Brecher; (yellow card) 44' Džemaili; 56' Okita; (yellow card) 90+3' Kryeziu	Attendance: 19,540; Referee: (Switzerland) Sven Wolfensberger; Assistant referees: (VAR) (Switzerland) Sascha Kever

8 April 2023 27	Zürich	1–1	Basel	Letzigrund, Zürich
18:00	López 19'; Ndoye (yellow card) 74'	SFV summary	(yellow card) 23' Kamberi; 26' Condé; (yellow card) 82' Hodza; (yellow card) 83' Mathew	Attendance: 19,451; Referee: (Switzerland) Lukas Fähndrich; Assistant referees: (VAR) (Switzerland) Fedayi San (Gebenstorf)

15 April 2023 28	Luzern	4–1	Zürich	Swissporarena, Luzern
20:30	Meyer 28'; Sorgić 37'; Dorn 49'; Dorn 64'	SFL summary	45' Mathew	Attendance: 14,217; Referee: (Switzerland) Luca Cibelli; Assistant referees: (VAR) (Switzerland) Lukas Fähndrich
Note: Fair game, no yellow cards

23 April 2023 29	Zürich	1–0	St. Gallen	Letzigrund, Zürich
16:30	Okita 57' (pen.); Kryeziu (yellow card) 62'	SFL summary	(yellow card) 34' Vallci; (yellow card) 83' Quintillà; (red card) 85' Dajaku	Attendance: 16,585; Referee: (Switzerland) Urs Schnyder; Assistant referees: (VAR) (Switzerland) Fedayi San (Gebenstorf)

26 April 2023 30	Servette	4–0	Zürich	Stade de Genève, Geneva
20:30	Bedia 1'; Pflücke 38'; Bedia 54'; Touati 85'	SFL summary	(yellow card) 43' Aliti; (yellow card) 57' Šimić; (yellow card) 66' Selnæs	Attendance: 4,818; Referee: (Switzerland) Alessandro Dudic; Assistant referees: (VAR) (Switzerland) Stephan Klossner

30 April 2023 31	Zürich	2–2	Sion	Letzigrund, Zürich
14:15	Condé (yellow card) 10'; Džemaili 25' (pen.); Kryeziu (yellow card) 60'; Džemaili 78' (pen.); Boranijašević (yellow card) 85'; Ligue (yellow card) 90+5'; Rohner (yellow card) 90+5'	SFL summary	20' Fortuné; (yellow card) 24' Ziegler; 44' Cyprien; (yellow card) 60' Karlen; (yellow card) 78' Sio; (yellow card) 90+5' Schmied	Attendance: 14,608; Referee: (Switzerland) Sven Wolfensberger; Assistant referees: (VAR) (Switzerland) Esther Staubli

7 May 2023 32	Basel	0–2	Zürich	St. Jakob-Park, Basel
16:30	Xhaka (yellow card) 56'; Augustin (yellow card) 85'; Adams (red card) 85'; Heiko Vogel (coach) (yellow card) 90'; Burger (red card) 90+7'; Xhaka (red card) 90+12'	SFL summary	(yellow card) 14' Aliti; (yellow card) 76' Kamberi; (yellow card) 81' Guerrero; (yellow card) 85' Katić; (yellow card) 85' Boranijašević; 90+1' (pen.) Šimić; (yellow card) 90+1' Šimić; 90+4' Mathew; (red card) 90+7' Kryeziu; (yellow card) 90+7' Marchesano	Attendance: 27,295; Referee: (Switzerland) Alessandro Dudic; Assistant referees: (VAR) (Switzerland) Stephan Klossner

14 May 2023 33	Young Boys	1–1	Zürich	Bern
				Stadium: Stadion Wankdorf

21 May 2023 34	Zürich	2–1	Grasshoppers	Zürich
				Stadium: Letzigrund

25 May 2023 35	Winterthur	0–2	Zürich	Winterthur
20:30		Report	Marchesano 6'; Guerrero 13'	Stadium: Stadion Schützenwiese; Referee: Lukas Fähndrich

29 May 2023 36	Zürich	2–3	Lugano	Zürich
16:30	Šimić 86'; Tosin 89'	Report	Hajrizi 18'; Celar 41'; Steffen 90'	Stadium: Letzigrund; Referee: Alessandro Dudic

=== Swiss Cup ===
21 August 2022 Round 1	SC Cham	0–4	Zürich	Cham
14:00 CEST (UTC+2)		Report	Tosin 17', 43' (pen.), 88'; Krasniqi 83'	Stadium: Eizmoos

18 September 2022 Round 2	Lausanne-Sport	3–2 (a.e.t.)	Zürich	Lausanne
16:00 CEST (UTC+2)	Labeau 24'; Nanizayamo (yellow card) 35'; Sanches (yellow card) 45+1'; Husic (yellow card) 75'; Turkeš 90+6' 114'	Report	Husic 8' (o.g.); Santini (yellow card) 33'; Marchesano 36'; Džemaili (yellow card) 41'; Kryeziu (yellow card) 48'; Condé (yellow card) 90+2'; Okita (yellow card) 105' (yellow-red card) 117'	Stadium: Stade de la Tuilière; Attendance: 5,050; Referee: (Switzerland) Alain Bieri

=== UEFA Champions League ===
==== Second qualifying round ====
The draw for the second qualifying round was held on 15 June 2022.

19 July 2022 First leg	Qarabağ (Azerbaijan)	3–2	(Switzerland) Zürich	Baku, Azerbaijan
20:00 AZT (UTC+4)	Kady 17'; Wadji 36', 66'	Report	Kamberi 65'; Kryeziu 85' (pen.)	Stadium: Tofiq Bahramov Republican Stadium; Attendance: 30,782; Referee: Irfan Peljto (Bosnia and Herzegovina)

27 July 2022 Second leg	Zürich (Switzerland)	2–2 (a.e.t.) (4–5 agg.)	(Azerbaijan) Qarabağ	Zürich
19:00 CEST (UTC+2)	Medvedev 4' (o.g.); Santini 90+6'	Report	Kady 56'; Owusu 98'	Stadium: Letzigrund; Attendance: 10,237; Referee: Allard Lindhout (Netherlands)

=== UEFA Europa League ===
==== Third qualifying round ====
The draw for the third qualifying round was held on 18 July 2022.

4 August 2022 First leg	Linfield (Northern Ireland)	0–2	(Switzerland) Zürich	Belfast, Northern Ireland
19:45 BST (UTC+1)		Report	Aiyegun 8'; Gnonto 64'	Stadium: Windsor Park; Attendance: 3,044; Referee: Marco Di Bello (Italy)

11 August 2022 Second leg	Zürich (Switzerland)	3–0 (5–0 agg.)	(Northern Ireland) Linfield	Zürich
19:00 CEST (UTC+2)	Avdijaj 11', 26'; Santini 84'	Report		Stadium: Letzigrund; Attendance: 7,904; Referee: Harm Osmers (Germany)

==== Play-off round ====
The draw for the play-off round was held on 2 August 2022.

18 August 2022 First leg	Zürich (Switzerland)	2–1	(Scotland) Heart of Midlothian	St. Gallen
19:00 CEST (UTC+2)	Guerrero 32'; Džemaili 34'	Report	Shankland 22' (pen.)	Stadium: Kybunpark; Attendance: 7,958; Referee: Bartosz Frankowski (Poland)
Note: Zürich will play their play-off round home match at Kybunpark in St. Gallen, instead of their regular stadium, Letzigrund, in Zürich, which is hosting a concert.

25 August 2022 Second leg	Heart of Midlothian (Scotland)	0–1 (1–3 agg.)	(Switzerland) Zürich	Edinburgh, Scotland
20:00 BST (UTC+1)		Report	Rohner 80'	Stadium: Tynecastle Park; Attendance: 17,225; Referee: Lawrence Visser (Belgium)

==== Group stage ====
The draw for the group stage was held on 26 August 2022.

Pos	Team	Pld	W	D	L	GF	GA	GD	Pts	Qualification	ARS	PSV	BOD	ZUR
1	(England) Arsenal	6	5	0	1	8	3	+5	15	Advance to round of 16	—	1–0	3–0	1–0
2	(Netherlands) PSV Eindhoven	6	4	1	1	15	4	+11	13	Advance to knockout round play-offs	2–0	—	1–1	5–0
3	(Norway) Bodø/Glimt	6	1	1	4	5	10	−5	4	Transfer to Europa Conference League	0–1	1–2	—	2–1
4	(Switzerland) Zürich	6	1	0	5	5	16	−11	3		1–2	1–5	2–1	—

Source: UEFA
Rules for classification: Group stage tiebreakers

8 September 2022 1	Zürich (Switzerland)	1–2	(England) Arsenal	St. Gallen (Note: Zürich played their first home match at Kybunpark, St. Gallen, instead of their regular stadium, Letzigrund, Zürich, due to a music concert and athletic event.)
18:45 CEST (UTC+2)	Kryeziu 44' (pen.)	Report	Marquinhos 16'; Nketiah 62'	Stadium: Kybunpark; Attendance: 17,070; Referee: Mohammed Al-Hakim (Sweden)

15 September 2022 2	Bodø/Glimt (Norway)	2–1	(Switzerland) Zürich	Bodø, Norway
21:00 CEST (UTC+2)	Selnæs 54' (o.g.); Vetlesen 58'	Report	Avdijaj 81'	Stadium: Aspmyra Stadion; Attendance: 8,000; Referee: Stéphanie Frappart (France)

6 October 2022 3	Zürich (Switzerland)	1–5	(Netherlands) PSV Eindhoven	Zürich
18:45 CEST (UTC+2)	Okita 87'	Report	Vertessen 10', 15'; Gakpo 21', 55'; Simons 35'	Stadium: Letzigrund; Attendance: 10,626; Referee: Willie Collum (Scotland)

13 October 2022 4	PSV Eindhoven (Netherlands)	5–0	(Switzerland) Zürich	Eindhoven, Netherlands
21:00 CEST (UTC+2)	Gutiérrez 9'; Veerman 15', 55'; Sangaré 34'; El Ghazi 84'	Report		Stadium: Philips Stadion; Attendance: 30,000; Referee: Ali Palabıyık (Turkey)

27 October 2022 5	Zürich (Switzerland)	2–1	(Norway) Bodø/Glimt	Zürich
18:45 CEST (UTC+2)	Boranijašević 67'; Marchesano 90+7'	Report	Pellegrino 45+1'	Stadium: Letzigrund; Attendance: 10,168; Referee: Yevhen Aranovskyi (Ukraine)

3 November 2022 6	Arsenal (England)	1–0	(Switzerland) Zürich	London, England
20:00 GMT (UTC±0)	Tierney 17'	Report		Stadium: Emirates Stadium; Attendance: 48,500; Referee: Erik Lambrechts (Belgium)
