= 2021–22 FC Zürich season =

FC Zürich
2021–22 season
- Chairman: Ancillo Canepa
- Manager: André Breitenreiter
- Stadium: Letzigrund
- Swiss Super League: 1st
- Swiss Cup: Third round
- Top goalscorer: League: Assan Ceesay (20); All: Assan Ceesay (22)
Home colours	Away colours

The 2021–22 season was FC Zürich's 126th season in existence and the club's fifth consecutive season in the top flight of Swiss football. In addition to the domestic league, Zürich participated in this season's editions of the Swiss Cup.

== Players ==
=== First-team squad ===
As of 2 February 2022

Note: Flags indicate national team as defined under FIFA eligibility rules; some limited exceptions apply. Players may hold more than one non-FIFA nationality.

No.	Pos.	Nation	Player
1	GK	SUI	Živko Kostadinović
2	DF	SUI	Lindrit Kamberi
3	DF	ESP	Adrià Guerrero
4	DF	SUI	Bećir Omeragić
5	DF	SUI	Silvan Wallner
6	DF	KOS	Fidan Aliti
7	MF	SUI	Bledian Krasniqi
9	FW	GAM	Assan Ceesay
10	MF	SUI	Antonio Marchesano
14	MF	CAN	Carson Buschman-Dormond (on loan from Tulevik)
15	FW	BEN	Tosin Aiyegun
16	DF	GER	Marc Hornschuh
18	FW	SLO	Blaž Kramer
19	DF	SRB	Nikola Boranijašević

No.	Pos.	Nation	Player
20	MF	CIV	Ousmane Doumbia
21	MF	SUI	Blerim Džemaili
22	FW	ITA	Wilfried Gnonto
23	MF	SUI	Fabian Rohner
24	MF	CRO	Ante Ćorić (on loan from Roma)
25	GK	SUI	Yanick Brecher (captain)
26	MF	TUN	Salim Khelifi
28	DF	EST	Karol Mets
31	DF	KOS	Mirlind Kryeziu
33	MF	SUI	Stephan Seiler
34	GK	SUI	Gianni De Nitti
39	MF	GER	Akaki Gogia
78	MF	GER	Moritz Leitner

=== Out on loan ===
Note: Flags indicate national team as defined under FIFA eligibility rules; some limited exceptions apply. Players may hold more than one non-FIFA nationality.

No.	Pos.	Nation	Player
—	MF	SUI	Izer Aliu (at Kriens until 30 June 2022)
—	DF	SUI	Filip Frei (at Wil until 30 June 2022)
—	DF	SUI	Ilan Sauter (at Wil until 30 June 2022)

No.	Pos.	Nation	Player
—	MF	SUI	Henri Koide (at Neuchâtel Xamax until 30 June 2022)
—	MF	SUI	Nils Reichmuth (at Wil until 30 June 2022])

== Pre-season and friendlies ==
Win Draw Loss Fixtures

25 June 2021 Friendly	Zürich	2–2	Wil	Zürich, Switzerland
14:00 CEST (UTC+2)		Report		Stadium: Sportanlage Heerenschürli

3 July 2021 Friendly	Zürich	0–1	Aarau	Zürich, Switzerland
12:00 CEST (UTC+2)		Report		Stadium: Letzigrund

7 July 2021 Friendly	Zürich	0–1	Feyenoord	Schruns, Austria
18:30 CEST (UTC+2)		Report	Sinisterra 3'	Stadium: Sportplatz Golm; Attendance: 0

10 July 2021 Friendly	Vaduz	0–0	Zürich	Sevelen, Switzerland
16:00 CEST (UTC+2)		Report		Stadium: Sportanlage FC Sevelen

17 July 2021 Friendly	Zürich	6–1	Kriens	Zürich, Switzerland
15:00 CEST (UTC+2)		Report		Stadium: Sportanlage Heerenschürli

17 July 2021 Friendly	Zürich	1–4	Neuchâtel Xamax	Zürich, Switzerland
17:00 CEST (UTC+2)		Report		Stadium: Sportanlage Heerenschürli

10 November 2021 Friendly	VfB Stuttgart	1–0	Zürich	Stuttgart, Germany
15:00 CET (UTC+1)	Kuol 90'			Stadium: Rasenplatz 1 VfB Stuttgart; Attendance: 0

17 January 2022 Friendly	Zürich	1–1	Pogoń Szczecin	Belek, Turkey
12:00 CET (UTC+1)		Report		Stadium: Cornelia Sportcomplex Pitch 1

22 January 2022 Friendly	Zürich	1–0	FC Wil	Zürich, Switzerland
14:00 CET (UTC+1)		Report		Stadium: Sportanlage Heerenschürli

== Competitions ==
=== Overall record ===
Competition	First match	Last match	Starting round	Final position	Record							
Competition	First match	Last match	Starting round	Final position	Pld	W	D	L	GF	GA	GD	Win %
Swiss Super League	25 July 2021	21 May 2022	Matchday 1		34	23	7	4	75	41	+34	67.65
Swiss Cup	14 August 2021	26 October 2021	Round 1	Round 3	3	2	1	0	13	2	+11	66.67
Total					37	25	8	4	88	43	+45	67.57

Source: Soccerway

=== Swiss Super League ===
==== League table ====
Pos	Team	Pld	W	D	L	GF	GA	GD	Pts	Qualification or relegation
1	Zürich (C)	36	23	7	6	78	46	+32	76	Qualification for Champions League second qualifying round
2	Basel	36	15	17	4	70	41	+29	62	Qualification for Europa Conference League second qualifying round
3	Young Boys	36	16	12	8	80	50	+30	60	Qualification for Europa Conference League second qualifying round
4	Lugano	36	16	6	14	50	54	−4	54	Qualification for Europa Conference League third qualifying round (Note: Lugano qualified for the Europa Conference League third qualifying round as the 2021–22 Swiss Cup champions.)
5	St. Gallen	36	14	8	14	68	63	+5	50	

Source: Swiss Super League
Rules for classification: 1) Points; 2) Goal difference; 3) Goals scored; 4) Head-to-head goal difference; 5) Away goals scored; 6) Draw.
(C) Champions

==== Results summary ====
Overall								Home						Away					
Pld	W	D	L	GF	GA	GD	Pts	W	D	L	GF	GA	GD	W	D	L	GF	GA	GD
29	19	6	4	62	36	+26	63	10	3	1	34	16	+18	9	3	3	28	20	+8

Last updated: 10 April 2022.

==== Results by round ====
Round	1	2	3	4	5	6	7	8	9	10	11	12	13	14	15	16	17	18	19	20	21	22	23	24	25	26	27	28	29	30	31	32	33	34	35	36
Ground	A	H	A	H	A	A	H	A	H	H	A	H	A	A	H	H	A	H	H	A	H	A	H	A	A	H	A	H	A	H	H	A	A	H	A	H
Result	W	W	W	W	D	L	D	L	W	W	D	D	W	W	W	W	W	W	W	W	W	D	W	W	W	L	W	D	L							
Position																																				

A = Away; H = Home; W = Win; D = Draw; L = Loss

==== Matches ====
The league fixtures were announced on 24 June 2021.

==== First half of season ====
25 July 2021 Round 1	Lugano	0–2	Zürich	Cornaredo, Lugano
14:15		SFL summary		Attendance: 2,120; Referee: Stefan Horisberger

31 July 2021 Round 2	Zürich	3–1	Lausanne-Sport	Letzigrund, Zürich
18:00		SFL summary		Attendance: 5,433; Referee: Luca Cibelli

8 August 2021 Round 3	Luzern	1–3	Zürich	Swissporarena, Luzern
16:30		SFL summary		Attendance: 8,861; Referee: Fedayi San (Gebenstorf)

21 August 2021 Round 4	Zürich	2–1	Grasshopper Club	Letzigrund, Zürich
18:00		SFL summary		Attendance: 14,,896; Referee: Urs Schnyder

28 August 2021 Round 5	St. Gallen	3–3	Zürich	Kybunpark, St. Gallen
18:00		SFL summary		Attendance: 15,045; Referee: Luca Cibelli

11 September 2021 Round 6	Young Boys	4–0	Zürich	Stadion Wankdorf, Bern
20:30		SFL summary		Attendance: 24,062; Referee: Adrien Jaccottet (Basel)

21 September 2021 Round 7	Zürich	2–2	Servette	Letzigrund, Zürich
20:30		SFL summary		Attendance: 7,104; Referee: Adrien Jaccottet (Basel)

26 September 2021 Round 8	Basel	3–1	Zürich	St. Jakob-Park, Basel
16:30	Millar 34'; Tavares 73'; Cabral 82'; Burger (yellow card) 86'	SFL summary FCB report	(yellow card) 38' Aliti; (yellow card) 73' Boranijašević; (yellow card) 78' Guerrero; 79' Marchesano; (yellow card) 86' Džemaili; (yellow card) 90+4' Gnonto	Attendance: 27,264; Referee: Urs Schnyder

3 October 2021 Round 9	Zürich	6–2	Sion	Letzigrund, Zürich
14:15		SFL summary		Attendance: 12,896; Referee: Alain Bieri (Solothurn)

16 October 2021 Round 10	Zürich	1–0	Lugano	Letzigrund, Zürich
20:30		SFL summary		Attendance: 7,325; Referee: Fedayi San (Gebenstorf)

23 October 2021 Round 11	Grasshopper Club	3–3	Zürich	Letzigrund, Zürich
20:30	Pusic (yellow card) 15'; Bonatini 17' (pen.); Margreitter 27'; Herc 35' (yellow card) 40'; Loosli (yellow card) 76'	SFL summary	3', 66' Pollero; 10' (yellow card) 15' Džemaili; (yellow card) 13' Kryeziu	Attendance: 15,700; Referee: Adrien Jaccottet

30 October 2021 Round 12	Zürich	3–3	Basel	Letzigrund, Zürich
20:30	Boranijašević 47'; Frei 53' (o.g.); Ceesay (yellow card) 90+3'; Ceesay 90+5'	SFL summary	29' Cabral; (yellow card) 42' Lang; 48' Ndoye; 63' Millar; (yellow card) 71' Kasami; (yellow card) 90+3' Burger	Attendance: 15,030; Referee: Lukas Fähndrich

7 November 2021 Round 13	Servette	1–2	Zürich	Stade de Genève, Geneva
14:15		SFL summary		Attendance: 6,028; Referee: Luca Cibelli

20 November 2021 Round 14	Sion	0–1	Zürich	Stade Tourbillon, Sion
18:00		SFL summary		Attendance: 8,750; Referee: Luca Piccolo

28 November 2021 Round 15	Zürich	1–0	Young Boys	Zürich
14:15 CET (UTC+1)		Report		Stadium: Letzigrund; Attendance: 15,338; Referee: Alain Bieri

4 December 2021 Round 16	Zürich	4–0	Luzern	Zürich
18:00 CET (UTC+1)		SFL summary		Stadium: Letzigrund; Referee: Lukas Fähndrich

11 December 2021 Round 17	Lausanne-Sport	1–3	Zürich	Stade de la Tuilière, Lausanne
18:00		SFL summary		Attendance: 3,192; Referee: (Switzerland) Luca Cibelli

18 December 2021 Round 18	Zürich	3–1	St. Gallen	Letzigrund, Zürich
18:00		SFL summary		Attendance: 11,571; Referee: (Switzerland) Alessandro Dudic

==== Second half of season ====
29 January 2022 Round 19	Zürich	1–0	Servette	Letzigrund, Zürich
18:00		SFL summary		Attendance: 11,007; Referee: (Switzerland) Fedayi San (Gebenstorf)

5 February 2022 Round 20	Grasshopper Club	1–3	Zürich	Letzigrund, Zürich
20:30	Schmid 43' (yellow card) 90+2'	Report	(yellow card) 33' Krasniqi; 47' (yellow card) 84' Ceesay; (yellow card) 64' Doumbia; 67' Tosin; 83' Gnonto	Attendance: 16,112; Referee: (Switzerland) Alain Bieri

13 February 2022 Round 21	Zürich	3–0	Lugano	Letzigrund, Zürich
16:30		SFL summary		Attendance: 11,069; Referee: (Switzerland) Luca Cibelli

20 February 2022 Round 22	Sion	1–1	Zürich	Stade Tourbillon, Sion
14:15		SFL summary		Attendance: 9,500; Referee: (Switzerland) Sandro Schärer (Buttikon)

27 February 2022 Round 23	Zürich	4–2	Basel	Letzigrund, Zürich
16:30	Marchesano 8'; Kramer 16'; Aliti (yellow card) 63'; Gnonto 78'; Ćorić (yellow card) 85'; Gnonto (yellow card) 88'; Boranijašević 90+5'	FCB report SFL summary	(yellow card) 21' Katterbach; (yellow card) 29' Frei; 38' Stocker; (yellow card) 64' Lang; 90+1' Lang	Attendance: 21,185; Referee: (Switzerland) Lukas Fähndrich

2 March 2022 Round 24	Luzern	0–2	Zürich	Lucerne
20:30 CET (UTC+1)		SFL summary		Stadium: Swissporarena; Attendance: 9,708; Referee: (Switzerland) Sandro Schärer

5 March 2022 Round 25	Lausanne-Sport	0–2	Zürich	Stade de la Tuilière, Lausanne
20:30		SFL summary		Attendance: 2,745; Referee: (Switzerland) Alain Bieri (Solothurn)

12 March 2022 Round 26	Zürich	0–3	St. Gallen	Letzigrund, Zürich
18:00		SFL summary		Attendance: 17,288; Referee: (Switzerland) Stefan Horisberger

19 March 2022 Round 27	Young Boys	1–2	Zürich	Stadion Wankdorf, Bern
20:30		SFL summary		Attendance: 31,120 (sold out); Referee: (Switzerland) Fedayi San (Gebenstorf)

2 April 2022 Round 28	Zürich	1–1	Grasshopper Club	Letzigrund, Zürich
17:30	Boranijasevic (yellow card) 11'; Džemaili (yellow card) 58'; Aliti 82'; Coric (yellow card) 58'	SFL summary	52' Morandi; (yellow card) 58' Sène; (yellow card) 58' Schmid; (yellow card) 79' Kacuri; (yellow card) 81' Loosli	Attendance: 15,327; Referee: (Switzerland) Sandro Schärer

10 April 2022 Round 29	Servette	1–0	Zürich	Stade de Genève, Geneva
14:15		SFL summary		Attendance: 7,877; Referee: (Switzerland) Stefan Horisberger

16 April 2021 Round 30	Zürich	2–1	Young Boys	Letzigrund, Zürich
16:30	33' Ceesay; 61' Ceesay	SFL summary	73' Siebatcheu	Attendance: 17,663; Referee: (Switzerland) Urs Schnyder

23 April 2022 Round 31	Zürich	5–1	Sion	Letzigrund, Zürich
17:30		SFL summary		Attendance: 14,735; Referee: (Switzerland) Alain Bieri (Solothurn)

1 May 2022 Round 32	Basel	0–2	Zürich	St. Jakob-Park, Basel
16:30	López (yellow card) 30'; Kasami (yellow card) 34'; Ndoye (yellow card) 81'; Pavlović (yellow card) 89'	SFL summary FCB report	(yellow card) 28' Ceesay; (yellow card) 31' Boranijašević; (yellow card) 34' Kryeziu; 40' Ceesay; 45+3' Boranijašević; (yellow card) 66' Doumbia	Attendance: 33,810; Referee: (Switzerland) Fedayi San (Gebenstorf)

7 May 2022 Round 33	St. Gallen	1–2	Zürich	Kybunpark, St. Gallen
20:30		SFL summary		Attendance: 18,891 (sold out); Referee: (Switzerland) Lukas Fähndrich

12 May 2022 Round 34	Zürich	2–2	Lausanne-Sport	Letzigrund, Zürich
20:30		SFL summary		Attendance: 11,304; Referee: (Switzerland) Esther Staubli

19 May 2022 Round 35	Lugano	v	Zürich	Cornaredo, Lugano
20:30		SFL summary

22 May 2022 Round 36	Zürich	v	Luzern	Letzigrund, Zürich
16:30		SFL summary

=== Swiss Cup ===
14 August 2021 Round 1	FC Solothurn	0–10	Zürich	Solothurn
16:00 CEST (UTC+1)		Report	Lopez 3' 19'; Marchesano 4' 35' 45+1'; Gogia 23'; Gnonto 61' (pen.); Krasniqi 76'; Ceesay 84' 87'	Stadium: Stadion FC Solothurn

17 September 2021 Round 2	SC Kriens	0–1	Zürich	Kriens
19:30 CEST (UTC+1)		Report	Marchesano 19'	Stadium: Stadion Kleinfeld

26 October 2021 Round 3	Yverdon-Sport FC	2–2 (a.e.t.) (11–10 p)	Zürich	Yverdon-les-Bains
20:15 CEST (UTC+1)	Beleck 43' 94'	Report	Gnonto 71'; Hornschuh 104'	Stadium: Stade Municipal; Attendance: 712
	Penalties
	Beleck (penalty scored); Hajrović (penalty scored); Ninte (penalty missed); Silva (penalty scored); Eleouet (penalty missed); Fargues (penalty scored); Lusuena (penalty scored); Jaquenoud (penalty scored); Blum (penalty scored); Salvi (penalty scored); Beleck (penalty scored); Hajrović (penalty scored); Ninte (penalty scored)		Marchesano (penalty missed); Kryeziu (penalty scored); Pollero (penalty missed); Gnonto (penalty scored); Krasniqi (penalty scored); Leitner (penalty scored); Guerrero (penalty scored); Hornschuh (penalty scored); Rohner (penalty scored); Aliti (penalty scored); Kryeziu (penalty scored); Leitner (penalty scored); Krasniqi (penalty missed)
