= 2023–24 FC Zürich season =

FC Zürich
2023–24 season
- Manager: Bo Henriksen (until 13 February); Murat Ural & Umberto Romano (from 13 February until 22 April, caretakers); Ricardo Moniz (from 22 April, caretaker)
- Stadium: Letzigrund
- Swiss Super League: 4th
- Swiss Cup: Quarter-finals
- Top goalscorer: League: Antonio Marchesano (12); All: Antonio Marchesano (13)
Home colours	Away colours

The 2023–24 season was FC Zürich's 128th season in existence and seventh consecutive in the Swiss Super League. They also competed in the Swiss Cup.

== Players ==
=== First-team squad ===
As of 7 September 2023

Note: Flags indicate national team as defined under FIFA eligibility rules; some limited exceptions apply. Players may hold more than one non-FIFA nationality.

No.	Pos.	Nation	Player
1	GK	BIH	Živko Kostadinović
2	DF	SUI	Lindrit Kamberi
3	DF	ESP	Adrià Guerrero
4	DF	SUI	Silvan Wallner
5	DF	SUI	Fabio Daprelà
7	MF	SUI	Bledian Krasniqi
8	MF	ISR	Arad Bar
9	FW	CRO	Ivan Santini
10	MF	SUI	Antonio Marchesano
11	FW	COD	Jonathan Okita
12	MF	NGR	Ifeanyi Mathew
16	DF	GER	Marc Hornschuh
17	MF	GUI	Cheick Condé
18	FW	GHA	Daniel Afriyie

No.	Pos.	Nation	Player
19	DF	SRB	Nikola Boranijašević
20	FW	SUI	Calixte Ligue
22	FW	IRL	Armstrong Oko-Flex
23	MF	SUI	Fabian Rohner
24	DF	BIH	Nikola Katić
25	GK	SUI	Yanick Brecher (captain)
26	MF	SUI	Miguel Reichmuth
27	DF	POR	Rodrigo Conceição
28	MF	SUI	Ramon Guzzo
29	FW	SUI	Labinot Bajrami
31	DF	KOS	Mirlind Kryeziu
32	MF	SUI	Selmin Hodza
37	MF	SUI	Nils Reichmuth
40	GK	SUI	Alan Omerovic

=== Out on loan ===
Note: Flags indicate national team as defined under FIFA eligibility rules; some limited exceptions apply. Players may hold more than one non-FIFA nationality.

No.	Pos.	Nation	Player
—	GK	SUI	Gianni De Nitti (at Schaffhausen until 30 June 2024)
—	DF	CUB	Fabian Gloor (at Baden until 30 June 2024)

== Transfers ==
=== In ===
Pos.	Player	Transferred from	Fee	Date	Source
DF	(Switzerland) Fabio Daprelà	(Switzerland) Lugano	Free	1 July 2023	
MF	(Republic of Ireland) Armstrong Oko-Flex	(England) West Ham United	Free	14 August 2023	
DF	(Portugal) Rodrigo Conceição	(Portugal) Porto	Free	17 August 2023	

=== Out ===
Pos.	Player	Transferred to	Fee	Date	Source
DF	(Estonia) Karol Mets	(Germany) FC St. Pauli	€450,000	1 July 2023	
FW	(Nigeria) Aiyegun Tosin	(France) Lorient	€4,000,000	25 July 2023	

== Pre-season and friendlies ==
Win Draw Loss Fixtures

June 2023 Friendly	FC Zürich (Switzerland)	v	(Switzerland)

== Competitions ==
=== Overall record ===
Competition	First match	Last match	Starting round	Final position	Record							
Competition	First match	Last match	Starting round	Final position	Pld	W	D	L	GF	GA	GD	Win %
Swiss Super League	23 July 2023	May 2024	Matchday 1		18	8	7	3	31	17	+14	44.44
Swiss Cup	August 2023			Round 1	3	3	0	0	6	0	+6	100.00
Total					21	11	7	3	37	17	+20	52.38

Last updated: 16 December 2023
Source: Soccerway

=== Swiss Super League ===
==== League table ====
Pos	Team	Pld	W	D	L	GF	GA	GD	Pts	Qualification or relegation (Note: Teams played each other three times (33 matches), before the league was split into two groups (the top six and the bottom six).)
1	Young Boys (C)	38	23	8	7	76	34	+42	77	Qualification for the Champions League play-off round
2	Lugano	38	20	5	13	67	51	+16	65	Qualification for the Champions League second qualifying round
3	Servette	38	18	10	10	59	43	+16	64	Qualification for the Europa League third qualifying round (Note: Servette qualified for the Europa League third qualifying round as the 2023–24 Swiss Cup winners.)
4	Zürich	38	16	12	10	53	41	+12	60	Qualification for the Conference League second qualifying round
5	St. Gallen	38	16	9	13	60	51	+9	57	Qualification for the Conference League second qualifying round
6	Winterthur	38	13	10	15	60	71	−11	49	
7	Luzern	38	13	10	15	47	53	−6	49	
8	Basel	38	13	10	15	45	52	−7	49	
9	Yverdon-Sport	38	13	8	17	50	71	−21	47	
10	Lausanne-Sport	38	11	12	15	48	53	−5	45	
11	Grasshopper (O)	38	10	8	20	41	49	−8	38	Qualification for the Relegation play-off
12	Lausanne Ouchy (R)	38	7	8	23	40	77	−37	29	Relegation to Swiss Challenge League

Source: Swiss Super League
Rules for classification: 1) Points; 2) Goal difference; 3) Goals scored; 4) Head-to-head goal difference; 5) Head-to-head goals scored 6) Away goals scored; 7) Draw.
(C) Champions; (O) Play-off winners; (R) Relegated

==== Results summary ====
Overall								Home						Away					
Pld	W	D	L	GF	GA	GD	Pts	W	D	L	GF	GA	GD	W	D	L	GF	GA	GD
18	8	7	3	31	17	+14	31	5	3	1	16	9	+7	3	4	2	15	8	+7

Last updated: 16 December 2023.

==== Results by round ====
Round	1	2	3	4	5	6	7	8	9	10	11	12	13	14	15	16	17	18
Ground	H	A	H	A	H	A	A	H	A	H	A	H	H	A	H	A	H	A
Result	W	D	W	W	D	D	D	W	W	W	D	D	L	W	W	L	D	L
Position	3	3	1	1	1	2	3	2	2	2	2	2	2	2	2	2	2	3

Updated to match(es) played on 16 December 2023. Source:
A = Away; H = Home; W = Win; D = Draw; L = Loss; P = Postponed

==== Matches ====
The league fixtures were unveiled on 21 June 2023.

	Zürich	v	Zürich
CET (UTC+1)			Stadium: Letzigrund

	v	Zürich
CET (UTC+1)

=== Swiss Cup ===
August 2023 Round 1	–	Zürich
CEST (UTC+2)
