= 2020–21 FC Zürich season =

FC Zürich
2020–21 season
- Stadium: Letzigrund
- Swiss Super League: 8th
- Swiss Cup: Second round
- Top goalscorer: League: Antonio Marchesano (13); All: Antonio Marchesano (13)

The 2020–21 FC Zürich season was the club's 125th season in existence and the fourth consecutive season in the top flight of Swiss football. In addition to the domestic league, Zürich participated in this season's edition of the Swiss Cup. The season covered the period from 11 August 2020 to 30 June 2021.

== Players ==
=== First-team squad ===
As of 12 February 2021

Note: Flags indicate national team as defined under FIFA eligibility rules; some limited exceptions apply. Players may hold more than one non-FIFA nationality.

No.	Pos.	Nation	Player
1	GK	BIH	Živko Kostadinović
3	DF	BRA	Nathan
4	DF	SUI	Bećir Omeragić
5	DF	GER	Lasse Sobiech
6	DF	KOS	Fidan Aliti
7	MF	SUI	Adrian Winter
8	MF	SUI	Vasilije Janjičić
9	FW	GAM	Assan Ceesay
10	MF	SUI	Antonio Marchesano
14	MF	SUI	Toni Domgjoni
15	FW	NGA	Tosin Aiyegun
16	GK	SUI	Novem Baumann
18	FW	SVN	Blaž Kramer
19	DF	SUI	Tobias Schättin
20	MF	CIV	Ousmane Doumbia
21	MF	SUI	Blerim Dzemaili
22	FW	ITA	Wilfried Gnonto

No.	Pos.	Nation	Player
23	DF	SUI	Fabian Rohner
25	GK	SUI	Yanick Brecher
26	MF	TUN	Salim Khelifi
27	MF	SUI	Marco Schönbächler
31	DF	KOS	Mirlind Kryeziu
32	MF	SUI	Nils Reichmuth
33	MF	SUI	Stephan Seiler
34	DF	SUI	Ilan Sauter
35	MF	SUI	Simon Sohm
36	DF	SUI	Filip Frei
41	MF	SUI	Lavdim Zumberi
42	DF	SUI	Silvan Wallner
48	MF	SUI	Nils Reichmuth
70	MF	KOS	Benjamin Kololli
71	MF	KOS	Hekuran Kryeziu
77	DF	CIV	Willie Britto

== Pre-season and friendlies ==
Win Draw Loss

22 August 2020 Friendly	Zürich	2–5	FC Schaffhausen	Zürich
12:00 CEST (UTC+2)		Report		Stadium: Sportanlage Heerenschürli

25 August 2020 Friendly	Luzern	2–0	Zürich	Lucerne
16:00 CEST (UTC+2)		Report		Stadium: Swissporarena

28 August 2020 Friendly	Zürich	1–0	Wil	Zürich
15:00 CEST (UTC+2)		Report		Stadium: Sportanlage Heerenschürli

5 September 2020 Friendly	Zürich	3–0	Winterthur	Zürich
14:00 CEST (UTC+2)		Report		Stadium: Stadion Letzigrund

9 January 2021 Friendly	Zürich	3–1	Luzern	Kriens
15:00 CEST (UTC+2)		Report		Stadium: Stadion Kleinfeld

16 January 2021 Friendly	Zürich	1–1	Winterthur	Schaffhausen
15:00 CEST (UTC+2)		Report		Stadium: LIPO Park Schaffhausen

== Competitions ==
=== Overview ===
Competition	First match	Last match	Starting round	Final position	Record							
Competition	First match	Last match	Starting round	Final position	Pld	W	D	L	GF	GA	GD	Win %
Swiss Super League	19 September 2020	21 May 2021	Matchday 1	8th	36	11	10	15	53	57	−4	30.56
Swiss Cup	13 September 2020		Round 2	Round 2	1	0	0	1	2	3	−1	0.00
Total					37	11	10	16	55	60	−5	29.73

Source: Competitions

=== Swiss Super League ===
==== League table ====
Pos	Team	Pld	W	D	L	GF	GA	GD	Pts	Qualification or relegation
6	Lausanne-Sport	36	12	10	14	52	55	−3	46	
7	St. Gallen	36	11	11	14	45	48	−3	44	
8	Zürich	36	11	10	15	53	57	−4	43	
9	Sion (O)	36	8	14	14	48	58	−10	38	Qualification for the relegation play-offs
10	Vaduz (R)	36	9	9	18	36	58	−22	36	Qualification for the Europa Conference League second qualifying round and relegation to Challenge League (Note: Vaduz qualified for the Europa Conference League second qualifying round by being declared winners of the 2020–21 Liechtenstein Cup.)

Source: Swiss Super League
Rules for classification: 1) Points; 2) Goal difference; 3) Goals scored; 4) Head-to-head goal difference; 5) Away goals scored; 6) Draw.
(O) Play-off winners; (R) Relegated

==== Results summary ====
Overall								Home						Away					
Pld	W	D	L	GF	GA	GD	Pts	W	D	L	GF	GA	GD	W	D	L	GF	GA	GD
36	11	10	15	53	57	−4	43	6	5	7	27	21	+6	5	5	8	26	36	−10

==== Results by round ====
Round	1
Ground	
Result	
Position	

A = Away; H = Home; W = Win; D = Draw; L = Loss

==== Matches ====
19 September 2020 1	Young Boys	2–1	Zürich	Stadion Wankdorf, Bern
19:00	Mambimbi 24'; Fassnacht 69'; Zesiger (yellow card) 16' (yellow-red card) 70'	https://www.sfl.ch/superleague/matchcenter/match/202021/yb-fcz-162082/ Summary	5' Kololli; (yellow card) 28' Ceesay; (yellow card) 45' (yellow-red card) 56' Kryeziu	Attendance: 1,000; Referee: Urs Schnyder

26 September 2020 2	Zürich	2–2	Lugano	Stadion Letzigrund, Zürich
19:00	Sobiech 37'; Marchesano 76'; Cardoso (yellow card) 90'	Report	Lovric (yellow card) 4'; Alexander Gerndt 9'; Sabbatini (yellow card) 26' (yellow-red card) 54'; Guidotti 90+1'	Stadium: Letzigrund, Zürich; Attendance: 1000; Referee: Stefan Horisberger

3 October 2020 3	Lausanne-Sport	4–0	Zürich	Stade Olympique de la Pontaise, Lausanne
19:00	Turkeš 12'; Puertas 41'; Boranijasevic (yellow card) 52'; Boranijasevic 76'; Guessand 88'	Report		Stadium: Olympique de la Pontaise, Lausanne; Attendance: 2350; Referee: Luca Cibelli

18 October 2020 4	Zürich	P-P	Basel	Letzigrund, Zürich
16:00

24 October 2020 5	Vaduz	1–4	Zürich	Rheinpark Stadion, Vaduz
19:00	Lüchinger (yellow card) 39'; Schmied 74'	Report	Sobiech 6'; Marchesano (yellow card) 23'; Aiyegun 41'; Ceesay 68'; Gnonto (yellow card) 74'; Schönbächler (yellow card) 76'; Gnonto 78'; Doumbia (yellow card) 82'	Stadium: Rheinpark Stadion, Vaduz; Attendance: 1396; Referee: Luca Piccolo

4 November 2020 4	Zürich	1–0	Basel	Letzigrund, Zürich
16:00	Doumbia (yellow card) 21'; Marchesano 46'	Report	van der Werff (yellow card) 21'	Attendance: 50; Referee: Alain Bieri

7 November 2020 7	Zürich	2–0	Luzern	Letzigrund, Zürich
19:00	Kololli 23'; Tosin (yellow card) 39' (yellow-red card) 61'; Marchesano 45'; Nathan (yellow card) 47'; Doumbia (yellow card) 54'; Brecher (yellow card) 89'	Report	Alves (red card) 22'; Schaub (yellow card) 34'; Sorgić (yellow card) 35'; Bürki (yellow card) 77'; Alounga (yellow card) 90'	Attendance: 50; Referee: Lukas Fähndrich

22 November 2020 8	Sion	2–2	Zürich	Stade Tourbillon, Sion
16:00	Ndoye (yellow card) 2'; Abdellaoui (yellow card) 22'; Karlen (yellow card) 34'; Karlen 48'; Araz (yellow card) 61'; Khasa 79'; Serey Dié (yellow card) 90+4'	Report	Aliti (yellow card) 40'; Schönbächler 47'; Kololli 55'	Attendance: 5 Referee: Sandro Schärer

2 December 2020 6	Servette	2–1	Zürich	Stade de Genève, Geneva
18:15	Kyei (yellow card) 60'; Kyei 69'; Ondoua (yellow card) 79'; Valls 94'	Report	Domgjoni 75'	Attendance: 5 Referee: David Schärli

6 December 2020 10	Zürich	4–0	Lausanne-Sport	Letzigrund, Zürich
16:00 CET	Domgjoni 17'; Tosin 28'; Kololli 90'; Ceesay 90+1'	Report	Loosli (yellow card) 26'; Geissmann (yellow card) 55'; Boranijašević (yellow card) 80'	Attendance: 0 Referee: Fedayi San

29 November 2020 9	Zürich	1–2	St. Gallen	Zürich
18:15 CET	Aliti (yellow card) 4'; Tosin 28' (yellow card) 62'; Nathan (yellow card) 56'; Kololli (yellow card) 74'; Doumbia (yellow card) 74'	Report	Youan 9' 37'; Görtler (yellow card) 52'; Rüfli (yellow card) 83'	Stadium: Letzigrund; Attendance: 0 Referee: Alessandro Dudic

13 December 2020 11	Lugano	0–1	Zürich	Cornaredo, Lugano
16:00 CET	Lovrić (yellow card) 63'; Lavanchy (yellow card) 90+1'	Report	Kramer 58'; Marchesano (yellow card) 76'; Rohner (yellow card) 84'	Attendance: 0 Referee: Sandro Schärer

16 December 2020 12	Luzern	0–0	Zürich	Swissporarena, Luzern
18:15 CET	Ugrinic (yellow card) 61'; Sorgić (yellow card) 88'; Alounga (yellow card) 89'	Report	Doumbia (yellow card) 22'; Nathan (yellow card) 30'; Domgjoni (yellow card) 88'	Attendance: 0 Referee: Léonce Lionel Tschudi

20 December 2020 13	Zürich	0–1	Servette	Letzigrund, Zürich
16:00 CET		Report

23 December 2020 14	Zürich	0–0	Sion	Letzigrund, Zürich

23 January 2021 15	Basel	1–4	Zürich	St. Jakob-Park, Basel
20:30	Arthur Cabral 75'	SFL summary	Cömert 67' (o.g.); Sobiech 73'; Frei 80' (o.g.); Marchesano 90+4' (pen.)	Referee: Sandro Schärer

27 January 2021 16	Zürich	0–1	Vaduz	Letzigrund, Zürich
18:15	Kramer (yellow card) 44' (yellow-red card) 89'; Ceesay (yellow card) 70'	Summary	(yellow card) 31' Gajić; (yellow card) 47' Obexer; 61' Schmid; (yellow card) 65' Wieser	Attendance: 5 Referee: Adrien Jaccottet, Basel

30 January 2021 17	St. Gallen	2–3	Zürich	Kybunpark, St. Gallen

3 February 2021 18	Zürich	1–4	Young Boys	Letzigrund, Zürich

6 February 2021 19	Vaduz	3–2	Zürich	Rheinpark Stadion, Vaduz
20:30	Cicek (yellow card) 31'; Gajić (yellow card) 42' (goal) 54'; Schmied 64'; Di Giusto 78'; Rahimi (yellow card) 90+1'	Summary	43' (yellow card) 46' Marchesano; (yellow card) 58' Winter; (yellow card) 65' Džemaili; 83' Aliti; (yellow card) 90+4' Kramer	Attendance: 5 Referee: Lukas Fähndrich
Note: COVID-19 pandemic in Switzerland

14 February 2021 20	Zürich	2–0	Basel	Letzigrund, Zürich
16:00	Aliti (yellow card) 17'; Marchesano 26' (pen.); Nathan (yellow card) 40'; Kramer (yellow card) 77' (goal) 90+2'	SFL summary	Frei (yellow card) 90+3'	Attendance: 0 Referee: Lukas Fähndrich
Note: COVID-19 pandemic in Switzerland

21 February 2021 21	Zürich	1–1	Sion	Letzigrund, Zürich
16:00
Note: COVID-19 pandemic in Switzerland

27 February 2021 22	Servette	3–1	Zürich	Stade de Genève, Geneva
18:15	Rouiller (yellow card) 19'; Miroslav Stevanović 26'; Valls (yellow card) 45+1'; Miroslav Stevanović 62'; Valls 67' (pen.)	SFL summary	12' Fabian Rohner; (yellow card) 54' Brecher; (yellow card) 56' Khelifi; (yellow card) 66' H. Kryeziu	Attendance: 5 Referee: Luca Piccolo
Note: COVID-19 pandemic in Switzerland

4 March 2021 23	Zürich	1–2	Luzern	Letzigrund, Zürich
20:30
Note: COVID-19 pandemic in Switzerland

7 March 2021 24	Lugano	0–1	Zürich	Cornaredo, Lugano
16:00
Note: COVID-19 pandemic in Switzerland

13 March 2021 25	Zürich	1–1	Lausanne-Sport	Letzigrund, Zürich
18:15

21 March 2021 26	Young Boys	4–0	Zürich	Stadion Wankdorf, Bern
20:30

3 April 2021 27	St. Gallen	1–1	Zürich	Kybunpark, St. Gallen
20:30

11 April 2021 28	Zürich	1–2	Servette	Letzigrund, Zürich

17 April 2021 29	Sion	2–2	Zürich	Stade Tourbillon, Sion

22 April 2021 30	Zürich	1–2	Young Boys	Letzigrund, Zürich

25 April 2021 31	Luzern	3–1	Zürich	Swissporarena, Luzern

2 May 2021 32	Zürich	3–0	Lugano	Letzigrund, Zürich

9 May 2021 33	Lausanne-Sport	2–2	Zürich	Stade de la Tuilière, Lausanne

12 May 2021 34	Zürich	2–2	St. Gallen	Letzigrund, Zürich

15 May 2021 35	Basel	4–0	Zürich	St. Jakob-Park, Basel
20:30	Petretta 21'; Zhegrova 30'; Kasami 63'; Petretta 77'; Cabral (yellow card) 86'	FCB report	(red card) 4' Nathan; (yellow card) 40' Schönbächler; (yellow card) 40' Domgjoni; (yellow card) 71' Kramer	Attendance: 100; Referee: Alain Bieri (Solothurn)

21 May 2021 36	Zürich	4–1	Vaduz	Letzigrund, Zürich
20:00

=== Swiss Cup ===
13 September 2020 Round 2	Chiasso	3–2	Zürich	Chiasso
16:00	Sofian Bahloul 17' 88' (pen.); Sifneos (yellow card) 23' (goal) 35'; Christian Nzila (yellow card) 48'; Strechie (yellow card) 90+5'	Report	Britto (yellow card) 34'; Ceesay 40' 76' (yellow card) 90+5'; Bangura (yellow card) 69'; Sohm (yellow card) 86'	Stadium: Stadio Comunale; Attendance: 0 Referee: (Switzerland) Fedayi San
