= Rodrigo Conceição =

Portuguese footballer (born 2000)

Personal information
- Full name: Rodrigo Fernandes da Conceição
- Date of birth: 2 January 2000 (age 26)
- Place of birth: Lisbon, Portugal
- Height: 1.75 m (5 ft 9 in)
- Positions: Right-back; winger

Team information
- Current team: Jagiellonia Białystok
- Number: 27

Youth career
- 2011–2012: Belenenses
- 2013: Imortal
- 2012–2013: Olhanense
- 2013–2014: Anadia
- 2014–2015: Boavista
- 2015–2019: Benfica

Senior career*
| Years | Team | Apps | (Gls) |
| 2018–2020 | Benfica B | 24 | (3) |
| 2020–2023 | Porto B | 39 | (1) |
| 2021–2023 | Porto | 16 | (0) |
| 2021–2022 | → Moreirense (loan) | 13 | (0) |
| 2023–2025 | FC Zürich | 52 | (1) |
| 2025–2026 | Tondela | 20 | (1) |
| 2026– | Jagiellonia Białystok | 9 | (0) |

International career
| 2016 | Portugal U16 | 9 | (3) |
| 2016–2017 | Portugal U17 | 10 | (2) |
| 2018 | Portugal U18 | 8 | (0) |
| 2018–2019 | Portugal U19 | 3 | (0) |
| 2019 | Portugal U20 | 2 | (0) |
| 2022 | Portugal U21 | 3 | (0) |
- * Club domestic league appearances and goals as of 21:27, 15 October 2026 (UTC)

Rodrigo Fernandes da Conceição (born 2 January 2000) is a Portuguese professional footballer who plays as a right-back or winger for Ekstraklasa club Jagiellonia Białystok.

== Club career ==
=== Benfica ===
Born in Lisbon, Conceição passed through several youth teams before joining Benfica in 2015, aged 15. On 3 November 2018, he made his professional debut with the reserves in a 2018–19 LigaPro match away to Paços de Ferreira, as a substitute for the last 15 minutes of a 1–0 loss in place of Florentino Luís.

Conceição scored his first senior goal on 3 November 2019, opening a 3–1 home loss to Chaves.

=== Porto ===
On 27 August 2020, having left Benfica, Conceição signed a three-year deal for Porto, being again assigned to the reserve team. He played 30 times in his first season, scoring to conclude a 4–0 win at Mafra on 29 March 2021 after assisting two other goals. On 22 May, in the last game of the campaign, he was sent off in a 2–1 loss at his previous team and suspended for two games.

Conceição was loaned to Primeira Liga club Moreirense for the season on 22 July 2021. He made his top-flight debut on 15 August in a 2–2 draw at Santa Clara, in which he came on in the 73rd minute for Rúben Ramos and received a red card three minutes later for telling the fourth official to open his eyes; he was banned for a game and fined €842, while maintaining that he was victimised for being from the Conceição family.

On 10 September 2022, Conceição made his first-team debut under his father's management, as an 82nd-minute substitute for Pepê in a 3–0 Primeira Liga home win over Chaves. A week later, he made his first start in a 1–1 draw at Estoril. In April 2023, he dropped back into the B-team.

At the end of the 2022–23 season, after having participated in the club's victorious Taça da Liga and Taça de Portugal campaigns, Conceição left Porto upon expiration of his contract.

=== FC Zürich ===
On 17 August 2023, Conceição signed for Swiss Super League club FC Zürich. Three months later, he extended his contract with the side until 2027. However, on 18 June 2025, Conceição announced that he had terminated his contract, leaving Zürich.

=== Tondela ===
On 12 December 2025, after six months as a free agent, Conceição returned to Portugal, signing a contract until June 2027 with Primeira Liga club Tondela.

=== Jagiellonia Białystok ===
On 12 July 2026, Conceição signed for Ekstraklasa club Jagiellonia Białystok.

== International career ==
Conceição earned 34 caps for Portugal at youth level, scoring five goals. His first appearance was on 4 February 2016 in the under-16 team's 3–3 draw with Germany in Vila Real de Santo António; he scored the equaliser and his team won on penalties. On 3 April, he scored both goals of a win against Switzerland in Póvoa de Varzim as his team finished a local tournament with a 100% record. On 7 September 2018, he was sent off in the under-19 team's 1–0 friendly win away to Italy. He made his debut for the under-21 side in a 9–0 win against Liechtenstein in Vaduz on 7 June 2022.

== Personal life ==
Conceição is the second of five sons born to Portuguese international footballer Sérgio Conceição. All of the first four embarked on football careers, including one also named Sérgio and Francisco.

== Career statistics ==
As of match played 15 October 2026

Appearances and goals by club, season and competition
| Club | Season | League | | | National cup (Note: Includes Taça de Portugal, Swiss Cup) | | League cup (Note: Includes Taça da Liga) | | Continental | | Other | | Total | |
| Club | Season | Division | Apps | Goals | Apps | Goals | Apps | Goals | Apps | Goals | Apps | Goals | Apps | Goals |
|---|---|---|---|---|---|---|---|---|---|---|---|---|---|---|
| Benfica B | 2018–19 | LigaPro | 4 | 0 | — | | — | | — | | — | | 4 | 0 |
| Benfica B | 2019–20 | LigaPro | 20 | 3 | — | | — | | — | | — | | 20 | 3 |
| Benfica B | Total | | 24 | 3 | — | | — | | — | | — | | 24 | 3 |
| Porto B | 2020–21 | Liga Portugal 2 | 30 | 1 | — | | — | | — | | — | | 30 | 1 |
| Porto B | 2022–23 | Liga Portugal 2 | 9 | 0 | — | | — | | — | | — | | 9 | 0 |
| Porto B | Total | | 39 | 1 | — | | — | | — | | — | | 39 | 1 |
| Porto | 2022–23 | Primeira Liga | 16 | 0 | 3 | 0 | 4 | 0 | 2 (Note: Appearance(s) in UEFA Champions League) | 0 | 0 | 0 | 25 | 0 |
| Moreirense (loan) | 2021–22 | Primeira Liga | 13 | 0 | 1 | 0 | 0 | 0 | — | | 2 (Note: Appearances in Primeira Liga relegation play-offs) | 0 | 16 | 0 |
| FC Zürich | 2023–24 | Swiss Super League | 26 | 1 | 3 | 0 | — | | — | | — | | 29 | 1 |
| FC Zürich | 2024–25 | Swiss Super League | 26 | 0 | 2 | 0 | — | | — | | — | | 28 | 0 |
| FC Zürich | Total | | 52 | 1 | 5 | 0 | — | | — | | — | | 57 | 1 |
| Tondela | 2025–26 | Primeira Liga | 20 | 1 | 0 | 0 | — | | — | | 0 | 0 | 20 | 1 |
| Jagiellonia Białystok | 2026–27 | Ekstraklasa | 9 | 0 | 0 | 0 | — | | 6 (Note: Appearances in UEFA Europa League) | 1 | — | | 15 | 1 |
| Career total | | | 173 | 6 | 9 | 0 | 4 | 0 | 8 | 1 | 2 | 0 | 196 | 7 |

== Honours ==
Porto

- Taça de Portugal: 2022–23
- Taça da Liga: 2022–23

== See also ==
- List of association football families
