= Akaki Gogia =

German footballer

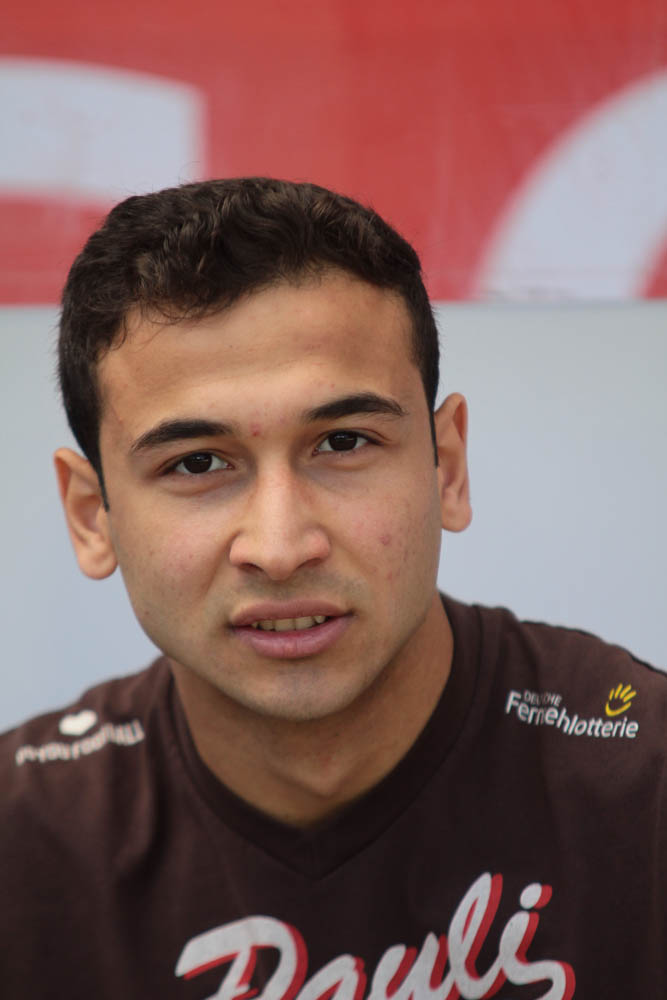
- Gogia while with FC St. Pauli in 2013

Personal information
- Full name: Akaki Gogia
- Date of birth: 18 January 1992 (age 34)
- Place of birth: Rustavi, Georgia
- Height: 1.78 m (5 ft 10 in)
- Positions: Winger; attacking midfielder

Youth career
- 2001: FSV 67 Halle
- 2001–2004: Hannover 96
- 2004–2011: VfL Wolfsburg

Senior career*
Years	Team	Apps	(Gls)
2009–2011	VfL Wolfsburg II	9	(0)
2011–2013	VfL Wolfsburg	0	(0)
2011–2012	→ FC Augsburg (loan)	12	(0)
2012–2013	→ FC St. Pauli (loan)	23	(1)
2013	→ FC St. Pauli II (loan)	1	(0)
2013–2015	Hallescher FC	71	(19)
2015–2017	Brentford	13	(0)
2016–2017	→ Dynamo Dresden (loan)	22	(10)
2017–2021	Union Berlin	60	(8)
2021–2022	FC Zürich	17	(3)
2022–2023	Dynamo Dresden	12	(0)
2023–2024	VSG Altglienicke	25	(5)
2024–2025	SC Freital	17	(3)
2026–	FSG Wacker 90 Dresden-Leuben	1	(0)

International career
2010	Germany U18	4	(0)
2010–2011	Germany U19	3	(1)
- * Club domestic league appearances and goals as of 22:16, 22 August 2026 (UTC)

Akaki Gogia (Georgian: აკაკი გოგია; born 18 January 1992) is a professional footballer who plays as a winger or attacking midfielder for Sachsenklasse Ost club FSG Wacker 90 Dresden-Leuben.

Gogia began his career in Germany with VfL Wolfsburg, before transferring to Hallescher FC in 2013. Following an abortive 2015–16 season in England with Brentford, he returned to Germany and played for Dynamo Dresden and Union Berlin. Following a spell as a fringe player with Swiss club FC Zürich, Gogia returned to Germany to rejoin Dynamo Dresden in 2022, for whom he had earlier played on loan. Following another spell as a fringe player, he dropped into lower-league football in 2023. His nickname is "Andy".

Born in Georgia, Gogia was capped by Germany at U18 and U19 level.

== Club career ==
=== VfL Wolfsburg ===
A midfielder, Gogia began his career in Germany as a junior with FSV 67 Halle and Hannover 96, before transferring to VfL Wolfsburg in 2004. He came through the youth ranks and made his reserve team debut in February 2010, going on to make 9 appearances. He scored prolifically for Wolfsburg's U17 and U19 teams, scoring a total of 44 goals in 86 appearances and contributing to the team's 2010–11 U19 Bundesliga win, in which he scored in the final.

Along with three other reserve players, Gogia was promoted to the first team squad in December 2010 by general manager Dieter Hoeness and coach Steve McClaren, who dropped Karim Ziani and Caiuby to the reserves. After being called into a winter training camp in Marbella, Gogia was called into the senior squad for the first time for a Bundesliga match versus Bayern Munich on 15 January 2011. He remained an unused substitute during the 1–1 draw and was called up twice more during the 2010–11 season.

On 11 May 2012, it was announced that Gogia had joined Bundesliga club FC Augsburg on loan for the 2011–12 and 2012–13 seasons. He made 14 appearances during his spell, which was cut short by torn ligaments in his left knee.

In July 2012, Gogia joined 2. Bundesliga club FC St. Pauli on loan for the 2012–13 season. He made 24 appearances and scored once before returning to Wolfsburg at the end of the season. Gogia departed VfL Wolfsburg in July 2013.

=== Hallescher FC ===
In July 2013, Gogia dropped down the 3. Liga to sign for hometown club Hallescher FC on a two-year contract. He made 81 appearances and scored 26 goals during his two seasons with the club. Gogia was part of the club's 2014–15 Saxony-Anhalt Cup-winning squad and scored in the 6–0 final victory over VfL Halle 1896.

=== Brentford ===
On 16 May 2015, it was announced that Gogia had signed a "long term" contract with English Championship club Brentford on a free transfer. He missed almost all of September 2015 with a thigh injury and after a change of manager and system in early October, Gogia dropped out of the starting lineup and out of the squad altogether by early December, save for two substitute appearances in January 2016. A further injury in March 2016 kept him on the sidelines, but he returned to make four substitute appearances in April and ended the season with 14 appearances.

Far down the midfield pecking order at the end of the 2016–17 pre-season, Gogia joined 2. Bundesliga club Dynamo Dresden on loan for the duration of the 2016–17 season, with an option to buy. He broke into the starting lineup and scored 7 goals in 17 appearances before suffering an ankle ligament injury during a league match versus 1. FC Nürnberg on 29 January 2017. Gogia returned to match play on 10 April and finished his spell with 10 goals in 24 appearances. He was reported by Kicker to have statistically been the best 2. Bundesliga player during the 2016–17 season. On 30 June 2017, Gogia joined the club on a permanent contract for an undisclosed fee (rumoured to be €750,000), but remained for just 24 hours before departing.

=== Union Berlin ===
On 1 July 2017, Gogia joined 2. Bundesliga club Union Berlin on a four-year contract. He made 22 appearances and scored two goals during the 2017–18 season and was a part of the squad which was promoted to the Bundesliga via the 2019 Bundesliga relegation play-offs. On his third appearance of the 2019–20 season, in a league match versus Eintracht Frankfurt on 27 September 2019, Gogia suffered a season-ending anterior cruciate ligament injury. He recovered to make 8 appearances during the 2020–21 season and was released when his contract expired. Gogia made 64 appearances and scored 8 goals during four seasons at the Stadion An der Alten Försterei.

=== FC Zürich ===
On 28 July 2021, Gogia signed a two-year contract with Swiss Super League club FC Zürich on a free transfer. He made 17 appearances and scored four goals during the club's Swiss Super League championship-winning 2021–22 season. After making just three appearances during the opening six weeks of the 2022–23 season, Gogia had his contract terminated by mutual consent on 29 August 2022. He made 21 appearances and scored four goals during 13 months at the Letzigrund.

=== Return to Dynamo Dresden ===
On 29 August 2022, Gogia returned to Dynamo Dresden and signed a two-year contract with the 3. Liga club. Gogia made 14 appearances during the 2022–23 season and had his contract terminated by mutual consent on 31 July 2023. Gogia made 38 appearances and scored 10 goals across his two spells with the club.

=== Lower-league football ===
On 1 August 2023, Gogia signed a contract with Regionalliga Nordost club VSG Altglienicke on a free transfer. He made 26 appearances and scored six goals during the 2023–24 season, before transferring to Oberliga Nordost-Süd club SC Freital on 1 August 2024. Gogia made 18 appearances and scored three goals prior to suffering a season-ending anterior cruciate ligament injury in March 2025. Gogia returned to football with Sachsenklasse Ost club FSG Wacker 90 Dresden-Leuben in August 2026.

== International career ==
Gogia won seven caps for Germany at U18 and U19 level, all in friendly matches. He scored once, in a 2–1 friendly defeat to Belgium on 25 March 2011. In May 2015, it was reported that Georgia had contacted Gogia about a call up.

== Personal life ==
Gogia was born in Rustavi, Georgia and moved to Halle, Germany with his parents at the age of 9 in 2001. His parents later moved to Hanover and then Augsburg, which influenced his moves to Hannover 96 and FC Augsburg. After basing his family in Berlin during and after his spell as a player with Union Berlin, Gogia and his family moved to Dresden in 2024. Gogia's 2019 anterior cruciate ligament injury was treated by his now-wife Vanessa and the pair opened a physiotherapy practice Dresden in 2025.

== Career statistics ==
As of match played 14 August 2026

Appearances and goals by club, season and competition
Club	Season	League			National cup (Note: Includes DFB-Pokal, FA Cup, Swiss Cup)		League cup (Note: Includes Football League Cup)		Europe		Other		Total	
Club	Season	Division	Apps	Goals	Apps	Goals	Apps	Goals	Apps	Goals	Apps	Goals	Apps	Goals
VfL Wolfsburg II	2009–10	Regionalliga Nord	4	0	—		—		—		—		4	0
VfL Wolfsburg II	2010–11	Regionalliga Nord	5	0	—		—		—		—		5	0
VfL Wolfsburg II	Total		9	0	—		—		—		—		9	0
VfL Wolfsburg	2010–11	Bundesliga	0	0	0	0	—		—		—		0	0
FC Augsburg (loan)	2011–12	Bundesliga	12	0	2	0	—		—		—		14	0
FC St. Pauli (loan)	2012–13	2. Bundesliga	23	1	1	0	—		—		—		24	1
FC St. Pauli II (loan)	2012–13	Regionalliga Nord	1	0	—		—		—		—		1	0
Hallescher FC	2013–14	3. Liga	36	8	—		—		—		5 (Note: Appearances in Saxony-Anhalt Cup)	1	41	9
Hallescher FC	2014–15	3. Liga	35	11	—		—		—		5	6	40	17
Hallescher FC	Total		71	19	—		—		—		10	7	81	26
Brentford	2015–16	Championship	13	0	0	0	1	0	—		—		14	0
Dynamo Dresden (loan)	2016–17	2. Bundesliga	22	10	2	0	—		—		—		24	10
Union Berlin	2017–18	2. Bundesliga	22	2	0	0	—		—		—		22	2
Union Berlin	2018–19	2. Bundesliga	28	6	1	0	—		—		2 (Note: Appearances in Bundesliga relegation play-offs)	0	31	6
Union Berlin	2019–20	Bundesliga	3	0	0	0	—		—		—		3	0
Union Berlin	2020–21	Bundesliga	7	0	1	0	—		—		—		8	0
Union Berlin	Total		60	8	2	0	—		—		2	0	64	8
FC Zürich	2021–22	Swiss Super League	15	3	3	1	—		—		—		18	4
FC Zürich	2022–23	Swiss Super League	2	0	1	0	—		0	0	—		3	0
FC Zürich	Total		17	3	4	1	—		0	0	—		21	4
Dynamo Dresden	2022–23	3. Liga	12	0	—		—		—		2 (Note: Appearance(s) in Saxony Cup)	0	14	0
VSG Altglienicke	2023–24	Regionalliga Nordost	25	5	—		—		—		1 (Note: Appearance in Berlin Cup)	1	26	6
SC Freital	2024–25	Oberliga Nordost-Süd	17	3	—		—		—		1	0	18	3
FSG Wacker 90 Dresden-Leuben	2026–27	Sachsenklasse Ost	1	0	—		—		—		—		1	0
Career total			282	49	11	1	1	0	0	0	16	8	311	58

== Honours ==
Hallescher FC

- Saxony-Anhalt Cup: 2014–15

Union Berlin

- Bundesliga relegation play-offs: 2019

FC Zürich

- Swiss Super League: 2021–22
