= Cheick Condé =

Guinean footballer (born 2000)

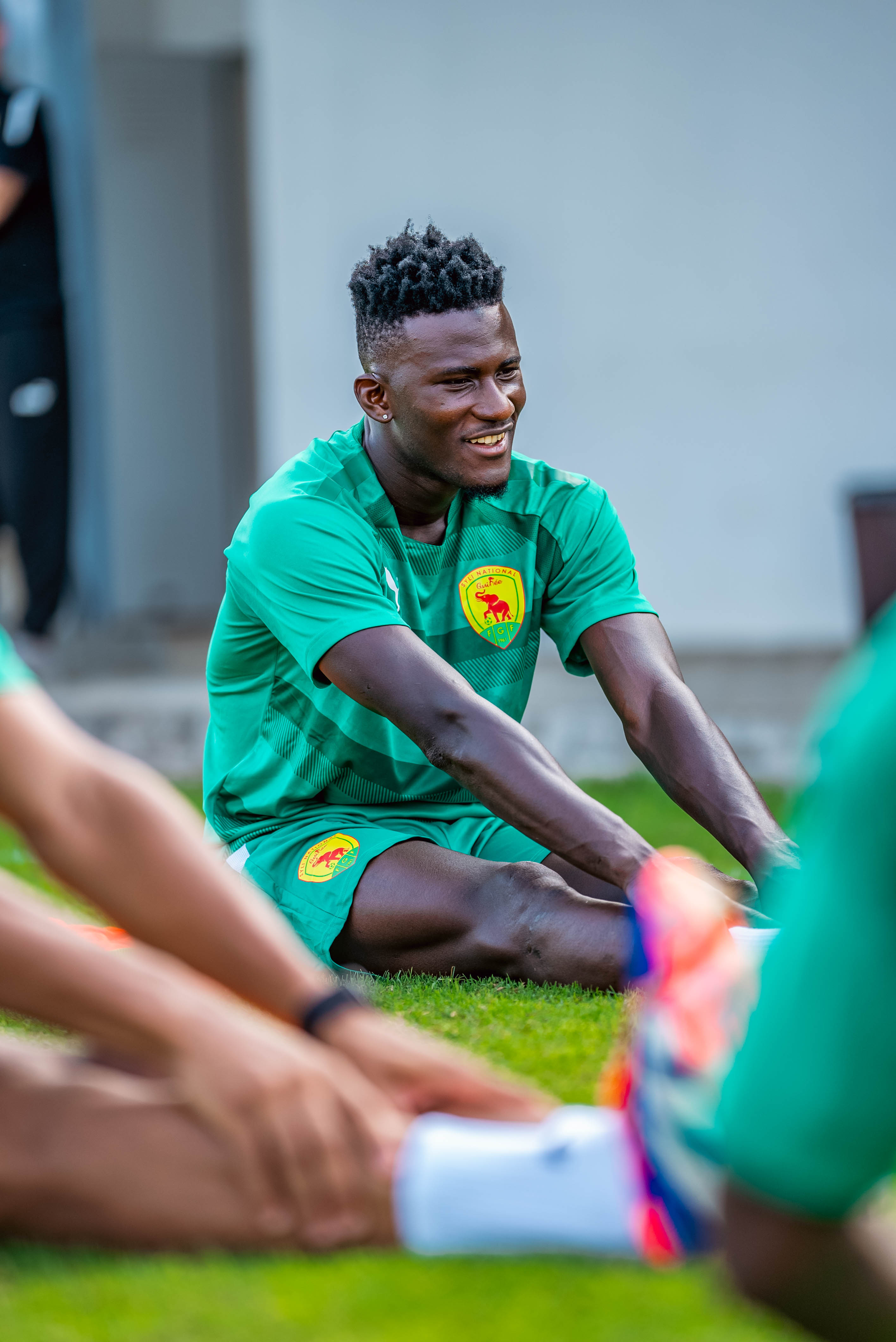
- Condé with Guinea in 2024

Personal information
- Full name: Cheick Oumar Condé
- Date of birth: 26 July 2000 (age 26)
- Place of birth: Conakry, Guinea
- Height: 1.85 m (6 ft 1 in)
- Position: Midfielder

Team information
- Current team: Beveren
- Number: 44

Youth career
- Séquence de Dixinn

Senior career*
Years	Team	Apps	(Gls)
- Séquence de Dixinn
2019–2020	MAS Táborsko	15	(0)
2020–2022	Fastav Zlín	65	(0)
2022–2025	Zürich	77	(2)
2025–2026	Venezia	9	(0)
2026	→ Blau-Weiß Linz (loan)	5	(0)
2026–	Beveren	2	(0)

International career^{‡}
2022–	Guinea	10	(0)
- * Club domestic league appearances and goals as of 16 August 2026 ‡ National team caps and goals as of 12 September 2026

Cheick Oumar Condé (born 26 July 2000) is a Guinean professional footballer who plays as a midfielder for Belgian Pro League club Beveren and the Guinea national team.

== Club career ==
=== Early years ===
Born in Conakry, Condé began his career with Guinean club Séquence de Dixinn.

=== MAS Táborsko ===
On 18 July 2019, Condé signed for Czech club MAS Táborsko.

=== Fastav Zlin ===
In January 2020, after playing fifteen league games for Táborsko, Condé signed for Fastav Zlín for a fee of 1.6 million Kč. On 15 February 2020, Condé made his Czech First League debut in a 2–0 loss away to Karviná.

=== FC Zürich ===
On 21 June 2022, Condé signed a four-year contract with FC Zürich in Switzerland. Conde made his debut for FC Zürich on 7 July 2022 in a 4–0 defeat to BSC Young Boys and spent 72 minutes on the field.

=== Venezia ===
On 8 January 2025, Condé signed a contract with Venezia in Italy until 30 June 2027. On 27 January 2026, Condé moved on loan to Blau-Weiß Linz in Austria. After the loan, Condé mutually terminated his contract with Venezia on 16 July 2026.

=== Beveren ===
On 29 July 2026, Condé moved to Beveren in Belgium on a two-season deal.

== International career ==
In March 2022, Condé received his first call up for the Guinea national team for the country's upcoming games against South Africa and Zambia. He debuted with Guinea in a friendly 0–0 tie with South Africa on 25 March 2022. In September 2022, Conde received a national invitation for Guinea's friendlies to play against Algeria and Ivory Coast, he played in both competitions.

== Style of play ==
Condé has been described as a box-to-box midfielder, drawing comparisons to West Ham United midfielder Tomáš Souček from former Fastav Zlín manager Bohumil Páník.

== Career statistics ==
=== Club ===
As of match played 25 May 2025

Appearances and goals by club, season and competition
Club	Season	League			Cup		Europe		Other		Total	
Club	Season	Division	Apps	Goals	Apps	Goals	Apps	Goals	Apps	Goals	Apps	Goals
MAS Táborsko	2019–20	Czech National Football League	15	0	2	1	0	0	—		17	1
Fastav Zlín	2019–20	Czech First League	11	0	0	0	0	0	—		11	0
Fastav Zlín	2020–21	Czech First League	20	0	1	0	0	0	—		21	0
Fastav Zlín	2021–22	Czech First League	34	0	2	0	0	0	—		36	0
Fastav Zlín	Total		65	0	3	0	0	0	0	0	68	0
Zürich	2022–23	Swiss Super League	30	1	2	0	11	0	—		43	1
Zürich	2023–24	Swiss Super League	33	1	1	0	—		—		34	1
Zürich	2024–25	Swiss Super League	14	0	2	0	4	0	—		20	0
Zürich	Total		77	2	5	0	15	0	0	0	97	2
Venezia	2024–25	Serie A	9	0	0	0	—		—		9	0
Career total			166	2	10	1	15	0	0	0	191	3

=== International ===
As of match played 27 September 2022

Appearances and goals by national team and year
National team	Year	Apps	Goals
Guinea	2022	3	0
Total		3	0
