= Bećir Omeragić =

Swiss footballer (born 2002)

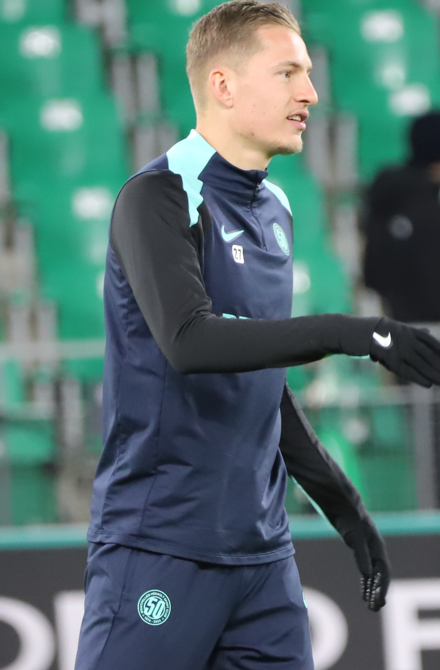
- Omeragić in 2024

Personal information
- Date of birth: 20 January 2002 (age 24)
- Place of birth: Geneva, Switzerland
- Height: 1.87 m (6 ft 2 in)
- Position: Defender

Team information
- Current team: Basel
- Number: 4

Youth career
- –2017: Étoile Carouge
- 2018: Servette

Senior career*
Years	Team	Apps	(Gls)
2018–2023	Zürich	103	(0)
2023–2026	Montpellier	72	(2)
2026–	Basel	14	(0)

International career^{‡}
2016–2017	Switzerland U15	8	(2)
2017	Switzerland U16	2	(0)
2017–2018	Switzerland U17	12	(0)
2020–	Switzerland U21	4	(0)
2020–	Switzerland	7	(0)
- * Club domestic league appearances and goals as of 28 September 2026 ‡ National team caps and goals as of 23:50, 8 September 2024 (UTC)

Bećir Omeragić (born 20 January 2002) is a Swiss professional footballer who plays as a defender for Swiss Super League club Basel and the Switzerland national team.

== Club career ==
Omeragić made his Swiss Super League debut for Zürich on 4 May 2019 in a game against Basel, as an 80th-minute substitute for Alain Nef.

On 11 May 2023, following five years at Zürich, he signed with Ligue 1 side Montpellier HSC.

== International career ==
Omeragić is a youth international for Switzerland. In September 2020, he had called up to the Switzerland squad for UEFA Nations League fixtures against Ukraine and Germany. He made his debut on 7 October 2020 in a friendly against Croatia.

In 2021, he was called up to the national team for the 2020 UEFA European Championship, where the team created one of the main sensations of the tournament reaching the quarter-finals.

== Personal life ==
Born in Switzerland to Bosniak parents, his father hails from Derventa and his mother hails from Prijedor. He is the brother of footballer Nedim Omeragić and cousin of Edin Omeragić.

== Career statistics ==
=== Club ===
As of 17 May 2025

Appearances and goals by club, season and competition
Club	Season	League			National Cup		Continental		Other		Total	
Club	Season	Division	Apps	Goals	Apps	Goals	Apps	Goals	Apps	Goals	Apps	Goals
Zürich	2018–19	Swiss Super League	5	0	0	0	0	0	—		5	0
Zürich	2019–20	Swiss Super League	19	0	1	0	—		—		20	0
Zürich	2020–21	Swiss Super League	29	0	1	0	—		—		30	0
Zürich	2021–22	Swiss Super League	27	0	1	0	—		—		28	0
Zürich	2022–23	Swiss Super League	23	0	1	0	3 (Note: Includes games in the qualifiers of the UEFA Champions League and the UEFA Europa League)	0	—		27	0
Zürich	Total		103	0	4	0	3	0	—		110	0
Montpellier	2023–24	Ligue 1	28	0	3	1	—		—		31	1
Montpellier	2024–25	Ligue 1	22	0	1	0	—		—		23	0
Montpellier	Total		50	0	4	0	—		—		54	1
Career total			153	0	8	0	3	0	0	0	164	1

== Honours ==
FC Zürich

- Swiss Super League: 2021–22
