= Nikola Katić =

Bosnian footballer (born 1996)

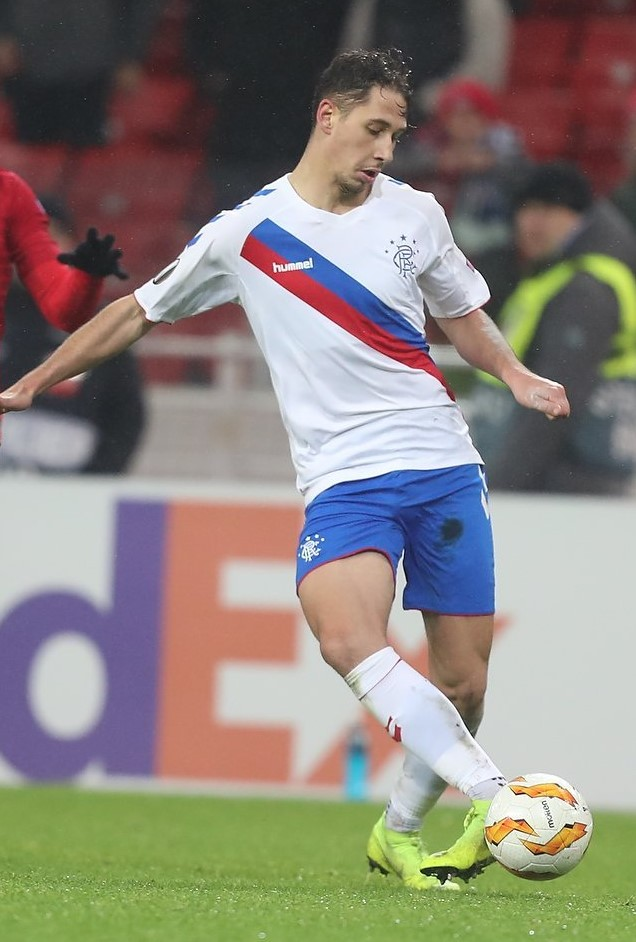
- Katić playing for Rangers in 2018

Personal information
- Date of birth: 10 October 1996 (age 30)
- Place of birth: Ljubuški, Bosnia and Herzegovina
- Height: 1.94 m (6 ft 4 in)
- Position: Centre-back

Team information
- Current team: Schalke 04
- Number: 25

Youth career
- 2001–2013: HNK Stolac

Senior career*
Years	Team	Apps	(Gls)
2013–2014	HNK Stolac		
2014–2015	Neretvanac Opuzen	29	(2)
2015–2018	Slaven Belupo	65	(1)
2018–2022	Rangers	37	(3)
2021–2022	→ Hajduk Split (loan)	21	(0)
2022–2025	Zürich	74	(7)
2025	→ Plymouth Argyle (loan)	15	(1)
2025–	Schalke 04	35	(1)

International career^{‡}
2017–2019	Croatia U21	8	(0)
2017	Croatia	1	(0)
2024–	Bosnia and Herzegovina	27	(2)
- * Club domestic league appearances and goals as of 8 November 2026 ‡ National team caps and goals as of 17 November 2026

Nikola Katić (pronounced [nǐkola kâtitɕ]; born 10 October 1996) is a Bosnian professional footballer who plays as a centre-back for Bundesliga club Schalke 04 and the Bosnia and Herzegovina national team.

Katić started his professional career at HNK Stolac, before joining Neretvanac Opuzen in 2014. Two years later he switched to Slaven Belupo. In 2018, he moved to Rangers, who loaned him to Hajduk Split in 2021. The following year, Katić signed with Zürich, who sent him on loan to Plymouth Argyle in 2025. Later that year, he was transferred to Schalke 04.

A former Croatian youth international, Katić also made his senior international debut for Croatia, before switching his allegiance to Bosnia and Herzegovina in 2024, earning over 20 caps since. He represented the nation at the 2026 FIFA World Cup.

== Club career ==
=== Early career ===
Katić came through the youth setup of HNK Stolac, which he joined in 2001. He made his professional debut in 2013 at the age of 16, before moving to Croatian team Neretvanac Opuzen in March 2014.

In December 2015, he switched to Slaven Belupo. On 7 May 2017, he scored his first professional goal in a triumph over Istra 1961.

=== Rangers ===
In June 2018, Katić was transferred to Scottish side Rangers for an undisclosed fee. He made his official debut for the club in a UEFA Europa League qualifier against Shkupi on 12 July. On 2 August, he scored his first goal for Rangers in a UEFA Europa League qualifier against Osijek. A week later, he made his league debut against Aberdeen. On 20 April 2019, he scored his first league goal for the team in a defeat of Hearts.

In October 2019, Katić signed a new four-year deal with the squad.

In July 2020, he suffered a severe knee injury, which was diagnosed as an anterior cruciate ligament tear and was ruled out for at least six months. Over a year after the injury, on 24 July 2021, he returned to the pitch.

He won his first trophy with the club on 7 March 2021, when they were crowned league champions.

==== Loan to Hajduk Split ====
In August 2021, he was sent on a season-long loan to Hajduk Split.

=== Zürich ===
In August 2022, Katić moved to Swiss outfit Zürich on a three-year contract. He made his competitive debut for the side in a UEFA Europa League game against PSV on 6 October. A week later, he made his league debut against Winterthur. On 13 November 2022, he scored his first goal for Zürich in a victory over Servette.

In October 2023, Katić extended his deal with the team until June 2026.

==== Loan to Plymouth Argyle ====
In January 2025, he was loaned to English club Plymouth Argyle until the end of the season.

On 9 February 2025, Katić played in Plymouth Argyle 1–0 win against Liverpool in the FA Cup fourth round. At the time, Plymouth was bottom of the Championship while Liverpool led the Premier League. Katić lost a tooth during the match.

=== Schalke 04 ===
In July 2025, Katić joined German side Schalke 04 on a contract until June 2028.

He debuted officially for the squad on 1 August against Hertha BSC, managed to score a goal and get sent off.

== International career ==
After representing Croatia at the under-21 level, Katić made his senior international debut in a friendly game against Mexico on 28 May 2017. However, in April 2024, he decided that he would play for Bosnia and Herzegovina in the future.

In May, his request to change sports citizenship from Croatian to Bosnian was approved by FIFA. Later that month, he received his first senior call-up, for friendly games against England and Italy. He debuted against the former on 3 June.

In June 2026, Katić was named in Bosnia and Herzegovina's squad for the 2026 FIFA World Cup. He made his tournament debut during the opening group fixture against Canada on 12 June.

== Personal life ==
Katić is an ethnic Croat. He is a cousin of Bosnian Presidency member Darijana Filipović.

== Career statistics ==
=== Club ===
As of match played 8 November 2026

Appearances and goals by club, season and competition
Club	Season	League			National cup (Note: Includes Croatian Cup, Scottish Cup, Swiss Cup, FA Cup, DFB-Pokal)		League cup (Note: Includes Scottish League Cup)		Continental		Total	
Club	Season	Division	Apps	Goals	Apps	Goals	Apps	Goals	Apps	Goals	Apps	Goals
Neretvanac Opuzen	2014–15	Croatian Second League	14	2	—		—		—		14	2
Neretvanac Opuzen	2015–16	Croatian Second League	15	0	—		—		—		15	0
Neretvanac Opuzen	Total		29	2	—		—		—		29	2
Slaven Belupo	2015–16	Croatian Football League	1	0	0	0	—		—		1	0
Slaven Belupo	2016–17	Croatian Football League	29	1	3	1	—		—		32	2
Slaven Belupo	2017–18	Croatian Football League	35	0	2	1	—		—		37	1
Slaven Belupo	Total		65	1	5	2	—		—		70	3
Rangers	2018–19	Scottish Premiership	18	1	1	0	2	1	9 (Note: Appearances in UEFA Europa League)	1	30	3
Rangers	2019–20	Scottish Premiership	19	2	1	0	1	0	8	1	29	3
Rangers	2020–21	Scottish Premiership	0	0	0	0	0	0	0	0	0	0
Rangers	Total		37	3	2	0	3	1	17	2	59	6
Hajduk Split (loan)	2021–22	Croatian Football League	21	0	4	0	—		—		25	0
Zürich	2022–23	Swiss Super League	22	1	0	0	—		4	0	26	1
Zürich	2023–24	Swiss Super League	34	4	1	0	—		—		35	4
Zürich	2024–25	Swiss Super League	18	2	3	0	—		4 (Note: Appearances in UEFA Conference League)	0	25	2
Zürich	Total		74	7	4	0	—		8	0	86	7
Plymouth Argyle (loan)	2024–25	Championship	15	1	2	0	—		—		17	1
Schalke 04	2025–26	2. Bundesliga	26	1	2	0	—		—		28	1
Schalke 04	2026–27	Bundesliga	9	0	2	0	—		—		11	0
Schalke 04	Total		35	1	4	0	—		—		39	1
Career total			276	15	21	2	3	1	25	2	325	20

=== International ===
As of match played 17 November 2026

Appearances and goals by national team and year
National team	Year	Apps	Goals
Croatia	2017	1	0
Bosnia and Herzegovina	2024	6	0
Bosnia and Herzegovina	2025	7	1
Bosnia and Herzegovina	2026	14	1
Bosnia and Herzegovina	Total	27	2
Career total		28	2

Scores and results list Bosnia and Herzegovina's goal tally first, score column indicates score after each Katić goal.

List of international goals scored by Nikola Katić
No.	Date	Venue	Cap	Opponent	Score	Result	Competition
1	9 October 2025	AEK Arena – Georgios Karapatakis, Larnaca, Cyprus	11	Cyprus	1–0	2–2	2026 FIFA World Cup qualification
2	6 June 2026	Energizer Park, St. Louis, United States	17	Panama	1–0	1–1	Friendly

== Honours ==
Rangers

- Scottish Premiership: 2020–21

Hajduk Split

- Croatian Cup: 2021–22

Schalke 04

- 2. Bundesliga: 2025–26
