= Assan Ceesay =

Gambian footballer

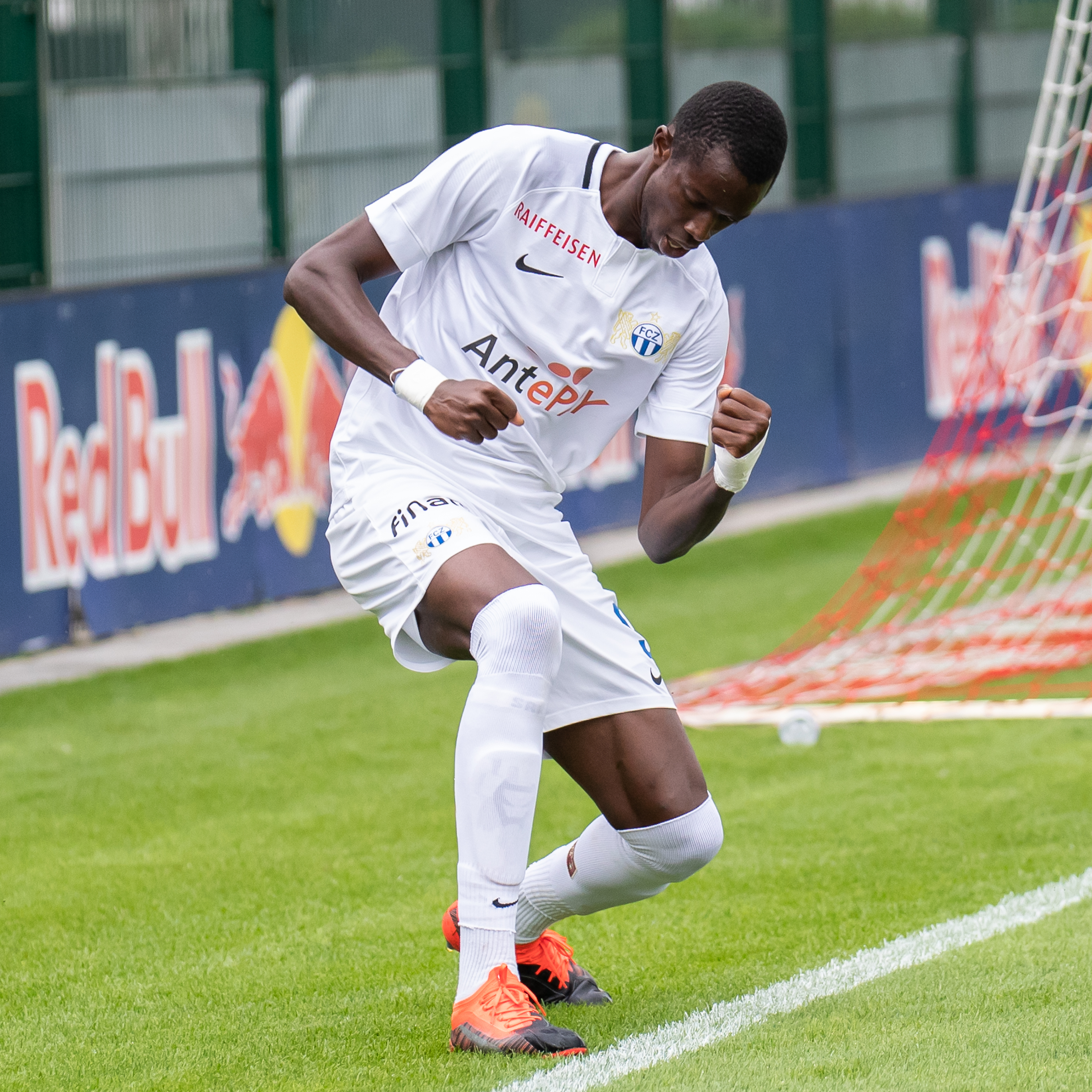

Personal information
- Full name: Assan Torrez Ceesay
- Date of birth: 17 March 1994 (age 32)
- Place of birth: Banjul, The Gambia
- Height: 1.89 m (6 ft 2 in)
- Position: Forward

Senior career*
Years	Team	Apps	(Gls)
2008–2014	Gamtel Banjul	3	(3)
2014–2015	Casa Sports		
2015–2016	ASC Niarry Tally		
2016	Lugano II	12	(12)
2016–2018	Lugano	17	(3)
2017–2018	→ Chiasso (loan)	31	(8)
2018–2022	Zürich	99	(26)
2020	→ VfL Osnabrück (loan)	11	(1)
2022–2023	Lecce	34	(6)
2023–2025	Damac	19	(6)

International career^{‡}
	Gambia U17	2	(0)
	Gambia U20	8	(3)
	Gambia U23	5	(2)
2013–	Gambia	41	(13)
- * Club domestic league appearances and goals as of 19:23, 16 February 2024 (UTC) ‡ National team caps and goals as of 23 January 2024

Assan Torrez Ceesay (born 17 March 1994) is a Gambian professional footballer who plays as a forward for the Gambia national team.

== Club career ==
In January 2020, Ceesay joined 2. Bundesliga side VfL Osnabrück, on loan from Swiss Super League club FC Zürich.

Assan had his highlight while playing with FC Zürich in the 2021–22 Swiss Super League where he helped the team win the title by scoring 20 goals and ending the season as 2nd best top-scorer of the league that season, and in third place as best assistant. This made him one of best players of the Swiss League and called the attention of many clubs worldwide to sign him.

On 16 June 2022, Ceesay agreed to join newly promoted Serie A club Lecce on a two-year contract, with the option of a third, from 1 July when his contract with FC Zürich would expire. On 14 August 2022, Ceesay scored on his league debut as Lecce was condemned to a 1-2 defeat against Inter Milan at Stadio Via del mare.

On 15 August 2023, Ceesay joined Saudi Pro League club Damac FC on a three-year deal.

== International career ==
Ceesay played in the 2021 Africa Cup of Nations, his national team's first continental tournament, where they made it to quarter-finals.

== Career statistics ==
=== Club ===
As of match played 4 December 2023

Appearances and goals by club, season and competition
Club	Season	League			Cup		Continental		Total	
Club	Season	Division	Apps	Goals	Apps	Goals	Apps	Goals	Apps	Goals
Lugano II	2015–16	2. Liga Interregional	12	12	—		—		12	12
Lugano	2016–17	Swiss Super League	12	1	1	0	—		13	1
Lugano	2018–19	Swiss Super League	5	2	0	0	—		5	2
Lugano	Total		17	3	1	0	0	0	18	3
Chiasso (loan)	2017–18	Swiss Challenge League	31	8	1	0	—		32	8
Zürich	2018–19	Swiss Super League	22	3	3	2	5	0	30	5
Zürich	2019–20	Swiss Super League	12	1	2	0	—		14	1
Zürich	2020–21	Swiss Super League	32	2	1	2	—		33	3
Zürich	2021–22	Swiss Super League	33	20	2	2	—		35	22
Zürich	Total		99	26	8	6	5	0	112	31
VfL Osnabrück (loan)	2019–20	2. Bundesliga	11	1	0	0	—		11	1
Lecce	2022–23	Serie A	34	6	1	0	—		35	6
Damac	2023–24	Saudi Pro League	14	6	2	1	-		16	7
Career total			218	62	13	7	5	0	236	69

=== International ===
Scores and results list Gambia's goal tally first, score column indicates score after each Ceesay goal.

List of international goals scored by Assan Ceesay
No.	Date	Venue	Opponent	Score	Result	Competition
1	23 March 2018	Independence Stadium, Bakau, Gambia	Central African Republic	1–0	1–1	Friendly
2	8 September 2018	Independence Stadium, Bakau, Gambia	Algeria	1–1	1–1	2019 Africa Cup of Nations qualification
3	12 October 2018	Stade Général Eyadema, Lomé, Togo	Togo	1–0	1–1	2019 Africa Cup of Nations qualification
4	10 September 2019	Estádio 11 de Novembro, Luanda, Angola	Angola	1–1	1–2	2022 FIFA World Cup qualification
5	13 November 2019	Estádio 11 de Novembro, Luanda, Angola	Angola	1–1	3–1	2021 Africa Cup of Nations qualification
6	13 November 2019	Estádio 11 de Novembro, Luanda, Angola	Angola	2–1	3–1	2021 Africa Cup of Nations qualification
7	9 October 2020	Estádio Municipal Bela Vista, Parchal, Portugal	Congo	1–0	1–0	Friendly
8	25 March 2021	Independence Stadium, Bakau, Gambia	Angola	1–0	1–0	2021 Africa Cup of Nations qualification
9	9 October 2021	Stade El Abdi, El Jadida, Morocco	Sierra Leone	1–0	1–2	Friendly
10	12 October 2021	Stade El Abdi, El Jadida, Morocco	South Sudan	1–0	2–1	Friendly
11	12 October 2021	Stade El Abdi, El Jadida, Morocco	South Sudan	2–0	2–1	Friendly
12	29 March 2022	Stade Adrar, Agadir, Morocco	Chad	1–1	2–2	2023 Africa Cup of Nations qualification
13	29 March 2022	Stade Adrar, Agadir, Morocco	Chad	2–1	2–2	2023 Africa Cup of Nations qualification

== Honours ==
Gamtel Banjul

- Gambian Cup: 2010, 2011, 2012, 2013

ASC Niarry Tally

- Senegal FA Cup: 2016

FC Zürich

- Swiss Super League: 2021–22
