= Selmin Hodža =

Swiss footballer (born 2003)

Personal information
- Date of birth: 24 May 2003 (age 23)
- Place of birth: Uster, Switzerland
- Height: 1.78 m (5 ft 10 in)
- Position: Right-back

Team information
- Current team: Zürich
- Number: 3

Youth career
- 2010–2017: FC Uster
- 2017–2022: Zürich

Senior career*
Years	Team	Apps	(Gls)
2022	Zürich U21	94	(9)
2022–	Zürich	25	(0)

International career^{‡}
2022	Switzerland U20	3	(0)
- * Club domestic league appearances and goals as of 28 September 2026 ‡ National team caps and goals as of 27 September 2022

Selmin Hodža (born 24 May 2003) is a Swiss Kosovan professional footballer who plays as a right-back for Zürich.

== Career ==
A youth product of FC Uster, Hodža moved to the youth academy of Zürich in 2017. He made his senior and professional debut with Zürich as a late substitute in a 2–1 loss to FC Lugano on 19 May 2022. On 14 September 2022, he signed his first professional contract with Zürich and was promoted to their senior team.

== International career ==
Born in Switzerland, Hodža is of Gorani descent, with roots in the village of Restelicë in Dragash, Kosovo. He is also Muslim. He is a youth international for Switzerland, having played for the Switzerland U20s.

In September 2026, Hodža was planned to be called up from Kosovo for the first four 2026–27 UEFA Nations League matches, against Republic of Ireland, the Austria (twice) and Israel. but due to an injury, he was unable to join the national team.

== Honours ==
FC Zürich

- 2021–22 Swiss Super League: 2021–22
