= Lindrit Kamberi =

Kosovan footballer (born 1999)

Personal information
- Date of birth: 7 October 1999 (age 27)
- Place of birth: Zürich, Switzerland
- Height: 1.83 m (6 ft 0 in)
- Position: Centre-back

Team information
- Current team: Zürich
- Number: 2

Youth career
- 2004–2012: FC Volketswil
- 2012–2017: Zürich

Senior career*
Years	Team	Apps	(Gls)
2017–2022	Zürich U21	51	(11)
2018–	Zürich	162	(14)
2019–2020	→ Wil (loan)	33	(0)
2020–2021	→ Winterthur (loan)	26	(1)

International career^{‡}
2018	Switzerland U19	1	(0)
2018–2019	Switzerland U20	6	(0)
2026–	Kosovo	2	(0)
- * Club domestic league appearances and goals as of 8 November 2026 ‡ National team caps and goals as of 18 November 2026

Lindrit Kamberi (born 7 October 1999) is a professional footballer who plays as a centre-back for Swiss Super League club Zürich. Born in Switzerland, he represented that nation at under-19 and under-20 levels before switching to play for the Kosovo national team in 2026.

== Club career ==
=== Zürich ===
Kamberi began playing football at the age of five with FC Volketswil before joining Team Zürich-Oberland and subsequently entering Zürich's youth system in 2012. He progressed through the club's Footeco programme and youth teams before reaching its under-15 side. After progressing through the club's youth system, Kamberi signed his first professional contract with Zürich in 2018. Before establishing himself in the first team, he captained the club's under-21 side and continued his development through competitive football in the Swiss lower divisions.

==== Loan to Wil ====
On 18 July 2019, Kamberi joined Wil on loan for the 2019–20 season, competing in the Swiss Challenge League. He made his league debut two days later, starting in a 1–0 victory over Chiasso on 20 July 2019. During his loan spell, he made 33 league appearances. The club subsequently confirmed that he had played 35 competitive matches in all competitions before returning to Zürich.

==== Loan to Winterthur ====
On 10 September 2020, Kamberi joined fellow Challenge League club Winterthur on loan for the 2020–21 season. He made his competitive debut for Winterthur on 12 September 2020, starting in a 2–1 victory over Tuggen in the Swiss Cup.

On 18 December 2020, he scored his first goal for Winterthur in a 3–2 league victory over his former club Wil. He finished the loan spell with 26 league appearances and one goal, while also contributing in the Swiss Cup.

==== Return to Zürich ====
In March 2021, Zürich recalled Kamberi from his loan spell before its scheduled conclusion, following injuries among the club's defenders. Following his return, Kamberi made his first-team debut for Zürich on 25 April 2021, coming on as an 84th-minute substitute for Nathan Cardoso in a 3–1 away defeat to Luzern.

Kamberi gradually established himself in Zürich's first team and became a regular starter from April 2022. During the 2021–22 season, he was part of the squad that won the Swiss Super League title. On 18 June 2022, Zürich announced that Kamberi had signed a three-year contract extension, keeping him at the club until the summer of 2025. At the time, he had made 18 competitive appearances for the first team and scored once.

On 20 January 2024, the club announced that Kamberi had extended his contract until June 2028. By that point, he had made 82 competitive appearances for Zürich's first team, scoring five goals. He had also started 17 of the club's first 18 league matches of the 2023–24 season.

In August 2025, Blick described Kamberi as one of Zürich's leading players. In an interview with the newspaper, he discussed his responsibilities within the team, particularly his role in supporting and guiding younger players.

By August 2026, Kamberi was serving as captain of Zürich.

== International career ==
Born in Zürich and raised in Volketswil, Kamberi is of Kosovan origin, as his parents emigrated from Kosovo to Switzerland during the 1980s. Between 2018 and 2019, he represented Switzerland at youth international level, making a total of seven appearances for the under-19 and under-20 teams.

On 23 August 2025, Kamberi revealed that he had previously been contacted by the Kosovo national team regarding a possible senior international career, although no further discussions had taken place. At the time, he remained focused on his performances at Zürich and had not made a decision about his international future. While later in October 2025, he expressed his openness to representing Kosovo, describing it as a dream.

On 6 November 2026, Kamberi received a call-up from the Kosovo national team for the 2026–27 UEFA Nations League matches against Israel and the Republic of Ireland. His debut with Kosovo came eight days later in the UEFA Nations League match against Israel after being named in the starting line-up.

== Career statistics ==
=== Club ===
As of match played 25 February 2023

Appearances and goals by club, season and competition
Club	Season	League			Cup		Continental		Other		Total	
Club	Season	Division	Apps	Goals	Apps	Goals	Apps	Goals	Apps	Goals	Apps	Goals
Zürich	2017–18	Swiss Super League	0	0	0	0	―		―		0	0
Zürich	2018–19	Swiss Super League	0	0	0	0	―		―		0	0
Zürich	2019–20	Swiss Super League	0	0	0	0	―		―		0	0
Zürich	2020–21	Swiss Super League	6	0	0	0	―		―		6	0
Zürich	2021–22	Swiss Super League	13	1	0	0	―		―		13	1
Zürich	2022–23	Swiss Super League	20	0	1 (Note: Appearance(s) in Swiss Cup)	0	10 (Note: Eight appearances in UEFA Europa League, two appearances and one goal in UEFA Champions League)	1	―		31	1
Zürich	Total		39	1	1	0	10	1	―		50	2
Wil (loan)	2019–20	Swiss Challenge League	33	0	1	0	―		―		34	0
Winterthur (loan)	2020–21	Swiss Challenge League	26	1	2	0	―		―		28	1
Career total			98	2	4	0	10	1	―		112	3
