= Jonathan Okita =

Congolese footballer

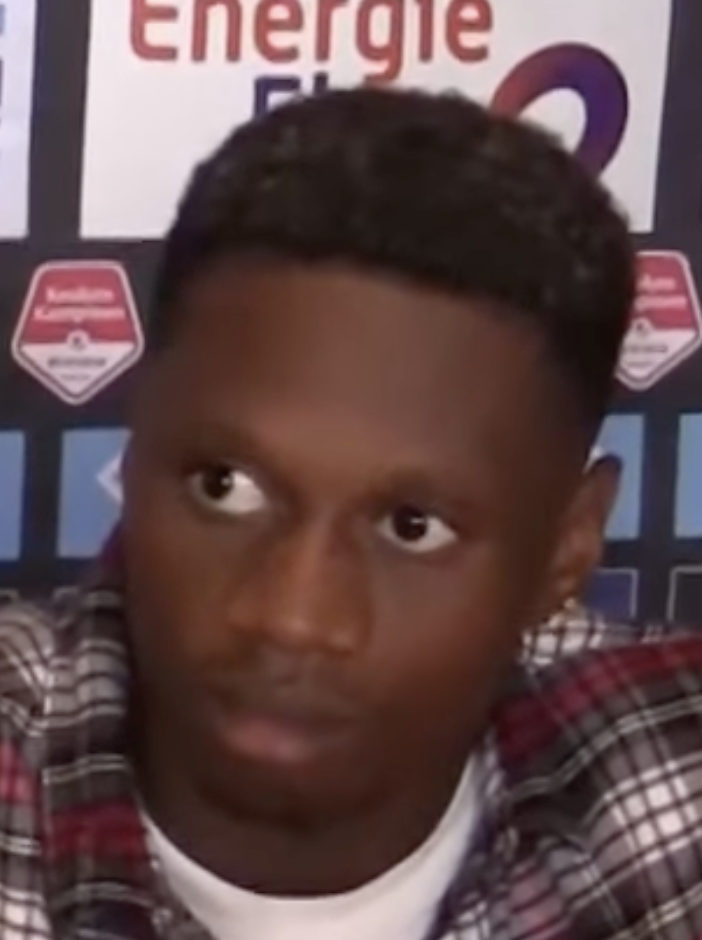

Personal information
- Full name: Jonathan Yula Okita
- Date of birth: 5 October 1996 (age 30)
- Place of birth: Cologne, Germany
- Height: 1.80 m (5 ft 11 in)
- Position: Winger

Team information
- Current team: Yverdon-Sport
- Number: 77

Youth career
- –2012: RCS Brainois
- 2012–2013: Tubize

Senior career*
Years	Team	Apps	(Gls)
2013–2014	Tubize	16	(0)
2016–2017	Standard Liège	2	(0)
2016	→ Roeselare (loan)	0	(0)
2017	→ Royale Union Saint-Gilloise (loan)	6	(0)
2017–2018	MVV	36	(18)
2018–2022	NEC	124	(32)
2022–2025	Zürich	75	(19)
2025–2026	Bodrum	20	(0)
2026	→ Damac (loan)	13	(2)
2026–	Yverdon-Sport	1	(1)

International career^{‡}
2021–	DR Congo	2	(0)
- * Club domestic league appearances and goals as of 9 October 2026 ‡ National team caps and goals as of 17 October 2023

Jonathan Yula Okita (born 5 October 1996) is a Congolese professional footballer who plays as a winger for Swiss Challenge League club Yverdon-Sport. Born in Germany, he plays for the DR Congo national team.

== Club career ==
Okita made his Belgian First Division A debut for Standard Liège on 17 April 2016 in a game against Royal Excel Mouscron.

=== NEC ===
On 24 August 2018, Okita signed a four-year contract with Eerste Divisie club NEC Nijmegen. Three days later, he made his debut for the club in the 2–1 away win over Jong FC Utrecht. On 8 September, he scored his first goal for the club in the 3–2 away win against Roda JC Kerkrade. In his first season, he impressed with NEC, scoring 15 goals and providing 13 assists in 41 appearances.

The following season, Okita struggled with his form, but still managed to score six goals and provide seven assists in 28 games. He was set to leave the club in the summer of 2020, but partly due to the COVID-19 pandemic he stayed at the Nijmegen-based club.

As new head coach Rogier Meijer took over the reins, Okita was again utilised in his attacking formation. On 23 May 2021, Okita won promotion to the Eredivisie with NEC by beating NAC Breda 2–1 in the final of the play-offs. Okita, who had once again gone through a mediocre season with four goals and four assists in 33 games, lived up in the play-offs. With four goals in three play-off games, including the matchwinner against NAC, he was a key player in the club's promotion.

=== Zürich ===
On 23 June 2022, Okita signed a three-year contract with Zürich in Switzerland.

=== Bodrum ===
On 10 January 2025, Okita moved to Bodrum in Turkey.

=== Yverdon ===
On 28 September 2026, Okita returned to Switzerland and signed with Yverdon-Sport.

== International career ==
Born in Germany, Okita is of Congolese descent. He debuted with the DR Congo national team in a 1–0 2022 FIFA World Cup qualification loss to Madagascar on 10 October 2021.
