= Alain Bieri =

Swiss football referee (born 1979)

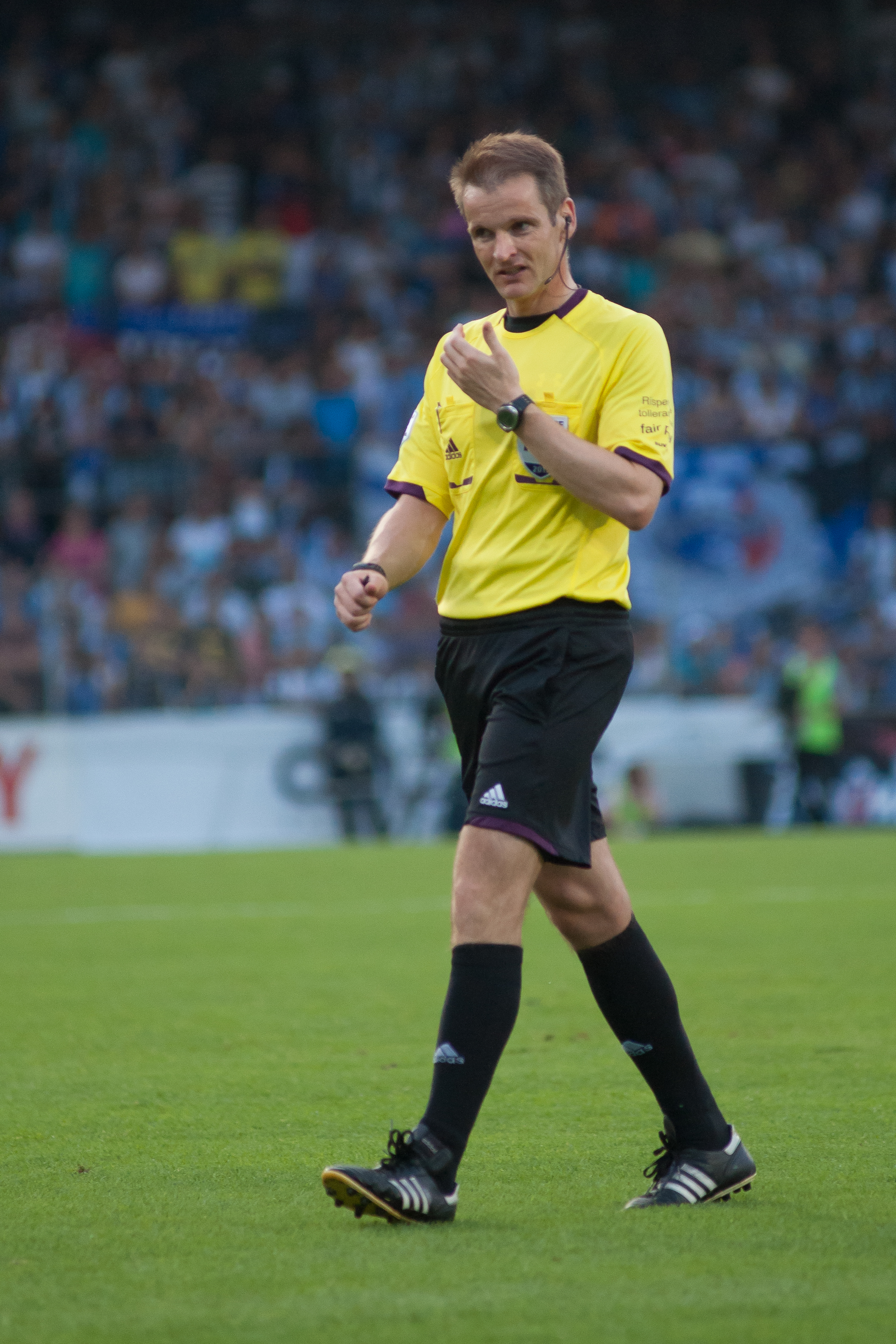
- Full name: Alain Bieri
- Born: 13 March 1979 (age 47); Switzerland
- Other occupation: commercial clerk HR manager

Domestic
Years	League	Role

International
Years	League	Role
2011–	FIFA listed	Referee

Alain Bieri (born 13 March 1979 in Switzerland) is a Swiss professional football referee. He has been a full international for FIFA since 2011.
