= Stephan Seiler =

Brazilian footballer (born 2000)

Personal information
- Full name: Stephan Vinicius Seiler
- Date of birth: 16 September 2000 (age 26)
- Place of birth: Fortaleza, Brazil
- Height: 1.74 m (5 ft 9 in)
- Position: Midfielder

Team information
- Current team: Vaduz
- Number: 8

Youth career
- 2009–2013: Wetzikon
- 2013–2020: Zürich

Senior career*
Years	Team	Apps	(Gls)
2020–2023	Zürich II	54	(3)
2020–2023	Zürich	38	(1)
2022	→ Winterthur (loan)	7	(1)
2023–2024	Bellinzona	27	(0)
2024–2025	Schaffhausen	24	(4)
2025–	Vaduz	33	(6)

International career^{‡}
2015–2016	Switzerland U16	8	(1)
2016–2017	Switzerland U17	6	(1)
2018–2019	Switzerland U19	6	(0)
2019	Switzerland U20	1	(0)
- * Club domestic league appearances and goals as of 9 August 2026 ‡ National team caps and goals as of 21 July 2019

Stephan Vinicius Seiler (born 16 September 2000) is a professional footballer who plays as a midfielder for Liechtensteiner Swiss Super League club Vaduz. Born in Brazil, he represents Switzerland internationally.

== Club career ==
Seiler made his professional debut with FC Zürich in a 3–2 Swiss Super League loss to BSC Young Boys on 19 June 2020.

On 31 August 2022, Seiler joined Winterthur on a season-long loan.

On 7 September 2023, Seiler moved to Bellinzona.

On 19 July 2024, Seiler signed with Schaffhausen.

== International career ==
Seiler was born in Brazil to a Swiss father and Brazilian mother, and moved to Switzerland at a young age. He is a youth international for Switzerland.
