= Nikola Boranijašević =

Serbian footballer

Personal information
- Date of birth: 19 May 1992 (age 34)
- Place of birth: Nova Varoš, FR Yugoslavia
- Height: 1.83 m (6 ft 0 in)
- Position: Right-back

Team information
- Current team: Mladost Lučani
- Number: 28

Youth career
- Zlatar Nova Varoš
- 2007–2011: Borac Čačak

Senior career*
Years	Team	Apps	(Gls)
2010–2016	Borac Čačak	62	(0)
2011	→ Polet Ljubić (loan)	13	(1)
2012	→ Rudar Kostolac (loan)	9	(0)
2016–2017	Ventspils	39	(1)
2017–2019	Napredak Kruševac	51	(2)
2019–2021	Lausanne-Sport	80	(5)
2021–2024	Zürich	96	(5)
2024–2025	Konyaspor	22	(0)
2025–	Mladost Lučani	19	(0)
- * Club domestic league appearances and goals as of 13 June 2026

Nikola Boranijašević (Serbian Cyrillic: Никола Боранијашевић; born 19 May 1992) is a Serbian professional footballer who plays as a right-back for Mladost Lučani.

== Career ==
Boranijašević signed with Lausanne-Sport on 7 January 2019.
