= Živko Kostadinović =

Bosnian footballer (born 1992)

Personal information
- Date of birth: 10 April 1992 (age 34)
- Place of birth: Modriča, Bosnia and Herzegovina
- Height: 1.96 m (6 ft 5 in)
- Position: Goalkeeper

Team information
- Current team: Zürich
- Number: 1

Youth career
- Lausanne-Sport

Senior career*
Years	Team	Apps	(Gls)
2011–2012	Stade Nyonnais	22	(0)
2012–2013	Vaduz	0	(0)
2013–2016	Schaffhausen	35	(0)
2014–2015	→Young Fellows Juventus (loan)	15	(0)
2016–2018	Le Mont	17	(0)
2018–2020	Wil	69	(0)
2020–2021	Zürich U21	3	(0)
2020–	Zürich	5	(0)
- * Club domestic league appearances and goals as of 5 June 2023

Živko Kostadinović (born 10 April 1992) is a Swiss professional footballer who plays as a goalkeeper for Zürich.

== Career ==
Kostadinović is a product of the youth academy of Lausanne-Sport, before beginning his senior career with Stade Nyonnais in 2011. The next year, he moved to Vaduz, before again moving to Schaffhausen in 2013. He had a brief stint with Le Mont, before transferring to FC Wil in 2018 where he became starter. On 2 August 2020 after 149 games in the Swiss Challenge League, he transferred to the Swiss Super League club FC Zürich until the summer of 2022. On 11 February 2022, he extended his contract with Zürich until the summer of 2024. He helped Zürich win the 2021–22 Swiss Super League.

== International career ==
Born in Bosnia and Herzegovina, Kostadinović is a Bosnian Serb, and moved to Switzerland at a young age. He was called up as a backup goalkeeper for the Switzerland U20s in 2012, without making an appearance.

== Honours ==
Vaduz

- Liechtenstein Football Cup: 2012–13

Zürich

- Swiss Super League: 2021–22
