= Mirlind Kryeziu =

Kosovan footballer (born 1997)

Personal information
- Date of birth: 26 January 1997 (age 29)
- Place of birth: Zurich, Switzerland
- Height: 1.98 m (6 ft 6 in)
- Position: Centre-back

Team information
- Current team: Winterthur
- Number: 31

Youth career
- 2004–2015: Zürich

Senior career*
| Years | Team | Apps | (Gls) |
| 2014–2019 | Zürich U21 | 24 | (2) |
| 2015–2016 | → Biel-Bienne (loan) | 15 | (0) |
| 2017–2025 | Zürich | 131 | (7) |
| 2021 | → Kriens (loan) | 10 | (0) |
| 2026– | Winterthur | 9 | (0) |

International career^{‡}
| 2013 | Albania U15 | 1 | (0) |
| 2013 | Switzerland U16 | 5 | (2) |
| 2013–2014 | Switzerland U17 | 13 | (0) |
| 2014–2015 | Switzerland U18 | 8 | (0) |
| 2015–2016 | Switzerland U19 | 2 | (0) |
| 2016–2017 | Switzerland U20 | 3 | (0) |
| 2021– | Kosovo | 10 | (0) |
- * Club domestic league appearances and goals as of 26 May 2026 ‡ National team caps and goals as of 28 March 2023

Mirlind Kryeziu (born 26 January 1997) is a professional footballer who plays as a centre-back for Winterthur. Born in Switzerland, he represents the Kosovo national team.

== Club career ==
=== Zürich ===
==== Early career and Zürich U21 ====
Kryeziu at the age of 7, he started playing football in Zürich. On 20 September 2014, he made his debut with Zürich U21 in a 2–2 away defeat against Breitenrain Bern after coming on as a substitute at 88th minute in place of Fabijan Markaj.

===== Loan at Biel-Bienne =====
On 6 July 2015, Kryeziu joined Swiss Challenge League side Biel-Bienne, on a season-long loan. On 5 December 2015, he made his debut in a 1–0 away defeat against Winterthur after being named in the starting line-up.

==== Promotion to the first team ====
On 13 February 2017, Kryeziu made his debut in a 1–1 home draw against Neuchâtel Xamax after being named in the starting line-up, Two months after debut, he signed his first professional contract with Swiss Challenge League side Zürich after agreeing to a four-year deal.

===== Loan at Kriens =====
On 16 February 2021, Kryeziu joined Swiss Challenge League side Kriens, on a season-long loan.

===== Departure =====
On 13 May 2025, it was announced that he would depart Zürich at the end of the season.

== International career ==
At the start of April 2013, Kryeziu received a call-up from Albania U15 for a selection camp in Switzerland. From 16 April 2013 to 28 March 2017, he has been part of Switzerland at youth international level, respectively has been part of the U16, U17, U18, U19 and U20 teams and he with these teams played 29 matches and scored one goal. On 9 November 2018, Kryeziu received a call-up from Kosovo for the 2018–19 UEFA Nations League matches against Malta and Azerbaijan, he was an unused substitute in these matches. On 2 September 2021, Kryeziu made his debut with Kosovo in a 2022 FIFA World Cup qualification match against Georgia after coming on as a substitute at last minutes in place of Valon Berisha.

== Personal life ==
Kryeziu was born in Zürich, Switzerland from Kosovo Albanian parents from Mleqani, a village near Mališevo. He holds Kosovan and Swiss passports.

== Career statistics ==
=== Club ===
As of 30 January 2021

Appearances and goals by club, season and competition
| Club | Season | League | | | Cup | | Continental (Note: Including continental competitions, such as UEFA Champions League and UEFA Europa League) | | Total | |
| Club | Season | Division | Apps | Goals | Apps | Goals | Apps | Goals | Apps | Goals |
|---|---|---|---|---|---|---|---|---|---|---|
| Zürich U21 | 2014–15 | 1. Liga Promotion | 2 | 0 | 0 | 0 | — | | 2 | 0 |
| Zürich U21 | 2016–17 | 1. Liga Promotion | 17 | 1 | 0 | 0 | — | | 17 | 1 |
| Zürich U21 | 2017–18 | Swiss Promotion League | 4 | 1 | 0 | 0 | — | | 4 | 1 |
| Zürich U21 | 2018–19 | Swiss Promotion League | 1 | 0 | 0 | 0 | — | | 1 | 0 |
| Zürich U21 | Total | | 24 | 2 | 0 | 0 | — | | 24 | 2 |
| Biel-Bienne (loan) | 2015–16 | Swiss Challenge League | 15 | 0 | 0 | 0 | — | | 15 | 0 |
| Zürich | 2016–17 | Swiss Challenge League | 3 | 1 | 0 | 0 | — | | 3 | 1 |
| Zürich | 2017–18 | Swiss Super League | 8 | 0 | 1 | 0 | — | | 9 | 0 |
| Zürich | 2018–19 | Swiss Super League | 18 | 0 | 2 | 0 | 3 | 0 | 23 | 0 |
| Zürich | 2019–20 | Swiss Super League | 21 | 1 | 2 | 0 | — | | 23 | 1 |
| Zürich | 2020–21 | Swiss Super League | 1 | 0 | 0 | 0 | — | | 1 | 0 |
| Zürich | Total | | 51 | 2 | 5 | 0 | 3 | 0 | 59 | 2 |
| Kriens (loan) | 2020–21 | Swiss Challenge League | 0 | 0 | 0 | 0 | — | | 0 | 0 |
| Career total | | | 90 | 4 | 5 | 0 | 3 | 0 | 98 | 4 |
