= Antonio Marchesano (footballer) =

Swiss footballer (born 1991)

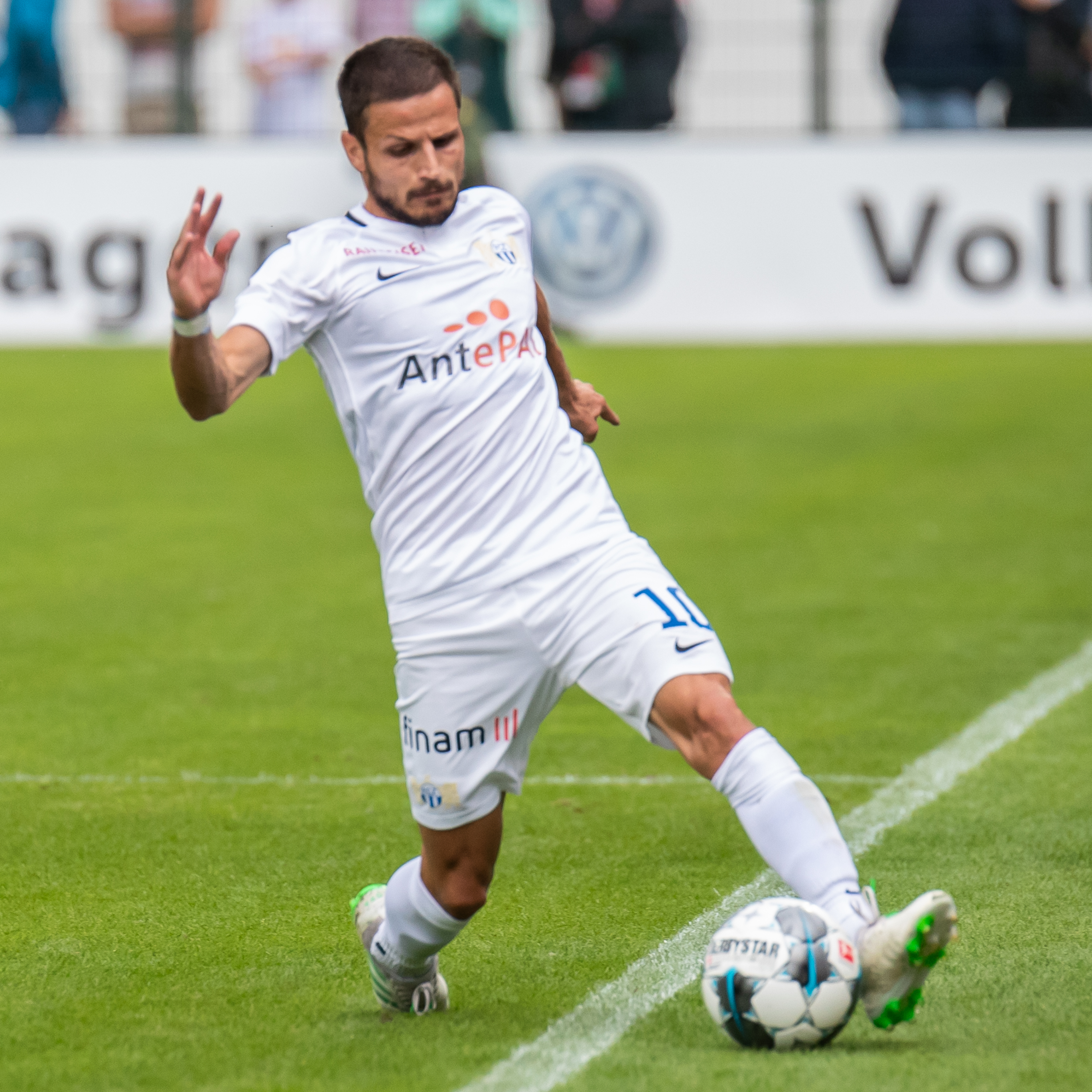

Personal information
- Date of birth: 18 January 1991 (age 35)
- Place of birth: Bellinzona, Switzerland
- Height: 1.67 m (5 ft 6 in)
- Position: Midfielder

Team information
- Current team: Winterthur
- Number: 20

Senior career*
Years	Team	Apps	(Gls)
2009–2010	GC Biaschesi	27	(2)
2010–2011	Locarno	26	(1)
2011–2013	Bellinzona	55	(12)
2013–2015	Winterthur	47	(4)
2015–2016	Biel-Bienne	25	(13)
2016–2025	FC Zürich	251	(57)
2025–2026	Yverdon-Sport	52	(19)
2026–	Winterthur	6	(3)

International career^{‡}
2011–2012	Switzerland U20	11	(0)
2012	Switzerland U21	1	(0)
- * Club domestic league appearances and goals as of 18 September 2026 ‡ National team caps and goals as of 26 June 2016

Antonio Marchesano (born 18 January 1991) is a Swiss professional footballer who plays as a midfielder for Swiss Challenge League club Winterthur.

Marchesano previously played for GC Biaschesi, Locarno, Bellinzona, FC Winterthur and Biel-Bienne.

== Career ==
Marchesano signed a contract until June 2020 with FC Zürich in September 2015.

On 30 January 2025, Marchesano moved to Yverdon-Sport on a one-and-a-half-year contract.

== Personal life ==
Marchesano is of Italian descent.
