= Fabian Rohner =

Swiss footballer (born 1998)

Personal information
- Full name: Fabian Daniel Rohner
- Date of birth: 17 August 1998 (age 28)
- Place of birth: Zürich, Switzerland
- Height: 1.78 m (5 ft 10 in)
- Position: Right midfielder

Team information
- Current team: Winterthur
- Number: 27

Youth career
- 2008: SV Höngg
- 2008–2017: Zürich

Senior career*
Years	Team	Apps	(Gls)
2017–2024	Zürich	110	(9)
2019–2020	→ Wil (loan)	27	(1)
2024–	Winterthur	29	(1)

International career
2015	Switzerland U18	1	(0)
2016–2017	Switzerland U19	3	(0)
2017	Switzerland U20	4	(0)
2018	Switzerland U21	4	(0)
- * Club domestic league appearances and goals as of 28 September 2026

Fabian Daniel Rohner (born 17 August 1998) is a Swiss professional footballer who plays as a right midfielder for Winterthur in the Swiss Super League.

== Club career ==
In 2013, Rohner scored with FC Zurich U15 in a 6-1 victory over the women's team.

On 6 January 2017, Rohner signed his first professional contract with FC Zürich. He made his professional debut for FCZ in a 2–1 Swiss Super League loss to FC Luzern on 10 December 2017.

On 25 July 2019, Rohner was loaned out to FC Wil for the 2019–20 season.

On 18 June 2024, Rohner signed a two-year contract with Winterthur.

== International career ==
Rohner is a youth international for Switzerland at the U18, U19, and U20 levels.
