= 2023–24 FC Sion season =

FC Sion
2023–24 season
- Manager: Didier Tholot
- Stadium: Stade de Tourbillon
- Swiss Challenge League: 1st (promoted)
- Swiss Cup: Semi-finals
- Top goalscorer: League: Dejan Sorgić (16); All: Dejan Sorgić (20)

The 2023–24 season was the club's first season since 2006 in the second tier of Swiss football and its 115th year of existence.

== Players ==
=== First-team squad ===
As of 15 February 2024

Note: Flags indicate national team as defined under FIFA eligibility rules; some limited exceptions apply. Players may hold more than one non-FIFA nationality.

No.	Pos.	Nation	Player
2	DF	SUI	Joël Schmied
3	DF	SUI	Reto Ziegler
4	DF	SEN	Gora Diouf
7	FW	FRA	Ilyas Chouaref
8	MF	BRA	Batata
9	FW	SUI	Dejan Sorgić
11	MF	FRA	Théo Bouchlarhem
12	GK	GRE	Alexandros Safarikas
14	DF	SUI	Numa Lavanchy
16	GK	COD	Timothy Fayulu
17	DF	SUI	Jan Kronig
18	DF	FRA	Jean-Claude Ntenda (on loan from Juventus)
20	DF	SUI	Nias Hefti

No.	Pos.	Nation	Player
23	FW	SUI	Théo Berdayes
27	FW	BFA	Abdel Zagré
28	MF	ANG	Edgar André
30	MF	BUL	Georgi Rusev
33	MF	SUI	Kevin Bua
35	MF	SUI	Liam Chipperfield
52	MF	URU	Cristian Souza
66	MF	ANG	Hervé Matondo
71	DF	SUI	Gilles Richard
76	FW	BRA	Cleilton Itaitinga
88	MF	SUI	Ali Kabacalman
90	DF	SUI	François Moubandje

=== Out on loan ===
Note: Flags indicate national team as defined under FIFA eligibility rules; some limited exceptions apply. Players may hold more than one non-FIFA nationality.

No.	Pos.	Nation	Player
—	GK	AUT	Heinz Lindner (at Saint-Gilloise until 30 June 2024)
—	DF	GLP	Nathanaël Saintini (at Kryvbas Kryvyi Rih until 30 June 2024)
—	MF	MDA	Nicky Cleșcenco (at Petrocub Hîncești until 30 June 2024)

No.	Pos.	Nation	Player
—	MF	FRA	Denis-Will Poha (at Quevilly-Rouen until 30 June 2024)
—	FW	SUI	Kevin Halabaku (at Schaffhausen until 30 June 2024)
—	FW	FRA	Yassin Fortuné (at Polissya Zhytomyr until 30 June 2024)

== Transfers ==
=== In ===
Pos.	Player	Transferred from	Fee	Date	Source
FW	(Serbia) Dejan Sorgić	(Switzerland) Luzern	Free	1 July 2023	
MF	(Switzerland) Ali Kabacalman	(Switzerland) Yverdon-Sport	Undisclosed	13 July 2023	
MF	(Switzerland) Liam Chipperfield	(Switzerland) Basel	Free	17 July 2023	
MF	(Uruguay) Cristian Souza	(Switzerland) Bellinzona	Free	17 July 2023	
FW	(Bulgaria) Georgi Rusev	(Bulgaria) CSKA 1948	€700,000	2 January 2024	
DF	(Switzerland) Jan Kronig	(Switzerland) Aarau	Undisclosed	1 February 2024	
DF	(France) Jean-Claude Ntenda	(Italy) Juventus Next Gen	Loan	15 February 2024	

=== Out ===
Pos.	Player	Transferred to	Fee	Date	Source
MF	(France) Wylan Cyprien	(Italy) Parma	Loan return	30 June 2023	
MF	(Switzerland) Luca Zuffi	(Switzerland) Winterthur	Free	1 July 2023	
MF	(Switzerland) Siyar Doldur	(Switzerland) Locarno	Undisclosed	9 February 2024	
DF	(Guadeloupe) Nathanaël Saintini	(Ukraine) Kryvbas Kryvyi Rih	Loan	14 February 2024	
FW	(Kosovo) Kevin Halabaku	(Switzerland) Schaffhausen	Loan	15 February 2024	

== Pre-season and friendlies ==
16 January 2024 Friendly	Badalona Futur (Spain)	2–3	(Switzerland) Sion
11:00 CET (UTC+1)

19 January 2024 Friendly	Sion (Switzerland)	0–1	(France) Annecy
19:30 CET (UTC+1)

22 March 2024 Friendly	Luzern (Switzerland)	2–1	(Switzerland) Sion	Lucerne
14:00 CET (UTC+1)	Grbić 15'; Hegglin 87'		Chipperfield 67'	Stadium: swissporarena

== Competitions ==
=== Overall record ===
Competition	First match	Last match	Starting round	Final position	Record							
Competition	First match	Last match	Starting round	Final position	Pld	W	D	L	GF	GA	GD	Win %
Swiss Challenge League	23 July 2023	20 May 2024	Matchday 1	Winners	36	23	10	3	72	23	+49	63.89
Swiss Cup	18 August 2023	27 April 2024	First round	Semi-finals	5	4	0	1	14	5	+9	80.00
Total					41	27	10	4	86	28	+58	65.85

Source: Competitions

=== Swiss Challenge League ===
==== League table ====
Pos	Team	Pld	W	D	L	GF	GA	GD	Pts	Promotion, qualification or relegation
1	Sion (C, P)	36	23	10	3	72	23	+49	79	Promotion to Swiss Super League
2	Thun	36	23	7	6	73	38	+35	76	Qualification for promotion play-off
3	Vaduz	36	13	10	13	67	55	+12	49	Qualification for Conference League second qualifying round (Note: Vaduz qualified for the Conference League second qualifying round by winning the 2023–24 Liechtenstein Cup.)
4	Xamax	36	11	16	9	55	45	+10	49	
5	Wil	36	11	11	14	48	52	−4	44	

Source: Swiss Challenge League
Rules for classification: 1) Points; 2) Goal difference; 3) Goals scored; 4) Head-to-head goal difference; 5) Head-to-head goals scored 6) Away goals scored; 7) Draw.
(C) Champions; (P) Promoted

==== Results by round ====
Round	1	2	3	4	5	6	7	8	9	10	11	12	13	14	15	16	17	18	19	20	21	22	23	24	25	26	27	28	29	30	31	32	33	34	35	36
Ground	A	H	H	A	A	H	A	H	A	H	A	H	A	H	A	H	A	H	A	H	H	A	A	H	A	H	A	H	A	H	A	H	H	A	A	H
Result	W	W	W	D	W	D	D	L	W	W	W	W	W	D	D	D	D	W	W	W	W	W	W	W	D	L	W	D	W	W	L	D	W	W	W	W
Position	2	2	2	3	2	1	3	3	2	2	2	2	1	1	1	1	1	1	1	1	1	1	1	1	1	1	1	1	1	1	1	1	1	1	1	1

A = Away; H = Home; W = Win; D = Draw; L = Loss

==== Matches ====
The matches were unveiled on 21 June 2023.

23 July 2023 1	Vaduz	0–2	Sion
CEST (UTC+2)

28 July 2023 2	Sion	1–0	Aarau	Sion
CEST (UTC+2)				Stadium: Stade de Tourbillon

4 August 2023 3	Sion	1–0	Bellinzona	Sion
CEST (UTC+2)				Stadium: Stade de Tourbillon

11 August 2023 4	Wil	0–0	Sion
CEST (UTC+2)

25 August 2023 5	Nyon	1–2	Sion
CEST (UTC+2)

1 September 2023 6	Sion	2–2	Baden	Sion
CEST (UTC+2)				Stadium: Stade de Tourbillon

22 September 2023 7	Schaffhausen	1–1	Sion
CEST (UTC+2)

25 September 2023 8	Sion	2–3	Thun	Sion
CEST (UTC+2)				Stadium: Stade de Tourbillon

29 September 2023 9	Neuchâtel Xamax	0–3	Sion
CEST (UTC+2)

6 October 2023 10	Sion	3–0	Wil	Sion
CEST (UTC+2)				Stadium: Stade de Tourbillon

21 October 2023 11	Baden	0–4	Sion
CEST (UTC+2)

27 October 2023 12	Sion	1–0	Neuchâtel Xamax	Sion
CEST (UTC+2)				Stadium: Stade de Tourbillon

5 November 2023 13	Bellinzona	1–2	Sion
CEST (UTC+2)

10 November 2023 14	Sion	3–3	Vaduz	Sion
CEST (UTC+2)				Stadium: Stade de Tourbillon

26 November 2023 15	Aarau	0–0	Sion
CEST (UTC+2)

8 December 2023 17	Thun	0–0	Sion
CEST (UTC+2)

12 December 2023 16	Sion	1–1	Nyon	Sion
CEST (UTC+2)				Stadium: Stade de Tourbillon

15 December 2023 18	Sion	2–1	Schaffhausen	Sion
CEST (UTC+2)				Stadium: Stade de Tourbillon

26 January 2024 19	Wil	1–4	Sion
CEST (UTC+2)

2 February 2024 20	Sion	2–0	Aarau	Sion
CEST (UTC+2)				Stadium: Stade de Tourbillon

9 February 2024 21	Sion	4–1	Baden	Sion
CEST (UTC+2)				Stadium: Stade de Tourbillon

16 February 2024 22	Vaduz	1–2	Sion
CEST (UTC+2)

23 February 2024 23	Schaffhausen	0–4	Sion
CEST (UTC+2)

3 March 2024 24	Sion	3–0	Bellinzona	Sion
CEST (UTC+2)				Stadium: Stade de Tourbillon

8 March 2024 25	Neuchâtel Xamax	0–0	Sion	Neuchâtel
CEST (UTC+2)

15 March 2024 26	Sion	1–2	Thun	Sion
CEST (UTC+2)				Stadium: Stade de Tourbillon

29 March 2024 27	Nyon	0–4	Sion
CEST (UTC+2)

2 April 2024 32	Sion	1–1	Neuchâtel Xamax	Sion
CEST (UTC+2)				Stadium: Stade de Tourbillon

6 April 2024 28	Sion	2–2	Vaduz	Sion
CEST (UTC+2)				Stadium: Stade de Tourbillon

13 April 2024 29	Baden	0–3	Sion
CEST (UTC+2)

19 April 2024 30	Sion	1–0	Nyon	Sion
CEST (UTC+2)				Stadium: Stade de Tourbillon

22 April 2024 31	Thun	1–0	Sion	Thun
CEST (UTC+2)

3 May 2024 33	Sion	4–0	Wil	Sion
CEST (UTC+2)				Stadium: Stade de Tourbillon

9 May 2024 34	Aarau	1–2	Sion	Aarau
CEST (UTC+2)

17 May 2024 35	AC Bellinzona	v	Sion	Bellinzona
20:15 CEST (UTC+2)				Stadium: Stadio Comunale

=== Swiss Cup ===
18 August 2023 First round	Étoile Carouge FC	1–3	Sion	Carouge
20:00 CEST (UTC+2)		Report		Stadium: Stade de la Fontenette

15 September 2023 Second round	Sion	3–0	Grasshoppers	Sion
20:30 CEST (UTC+2)		Report		Stadium: Stade de Tourbillon; Referee: Urs Schnyder

31 October 2023 Round of 16	Onex	1–6	Sion	Meyrin
20:30 CET (UTC+1)		Report		Stadium: Stade des Arbères Terrain D Referee: David Huwiler

29 February 2024 Quarter-finals	Sion	2–1	Young Boys	Sion
20:30 CET (UTC+1)		Report		Stadium: Stade de Tourbillon; Referee: Fedayi San

27 April 2024 Semi-finals	Sion	0–2	Lugano	Sion
20:30 CEST (UTC+2)		Report		Stadium: Stade de Tourbillon; Referee: Urs Schnyder
