= 2022–23 FC Sion season =

FC Sion
2022–23 season
- President: Christian Constantin
- Head coach: Paolo Tramezzani
- Stadium: Stade Tourbillon
- Swiss Super League: 10th (relegated)
- Swiss Cup: Quarter-finals

The 2022–23 season was the 114th in the history of FC Sion and their 15th consecutive season in the top flight. The club participated in Swiss Super League and Swiss Cup. The season covered the period from 1 July 2022 to 30 June 2023.

== Players ==
=== First-team squad ===
As of 1 September 2022

Note: Flags indicate national team as defined under FIFA eligibility rules; some limited exceptions apply. Players may hold more than one non-FIFA nationality.

No.	Pos.	Nation	Player
1	GK	AUT	Heinz Lindner
2	DF	SUI	Joël Schmied
7	MF	SUI	Luca Zuffi
8	MF	BRA	Batata
9	FW	FRA	Ilyas Chouaref
10	MF	FRA	Wylan Cyprien (on loan from Parma)
11	FW	SUI	Gaëtan Karlen
12	GK	GRE	Alexandros Safarikas
13	FW	CIV	Giovanni Sio
14	MF	SUI	Anto Grgić
15	MF	ESP	José Aguilar
17	FW	SUI	Filip Stojilković
18	GK	SUI	Kevin Fickentscher

No.	Pos.	Nation	Player
19	DF	SUI	Numa Lavanchy
20	MF	SUI	Musa Araz
21	DF	SUI	Dennis Iapichino
22	MF	FRA	Denis-Will Poha
27	FW	BFA	Abdel Zagré
29	FW	KOS	Kevin Halabaku
33	MF	SUI	Kevin Bua
39	DF	GLP	Nathanaël Saintini
45	FW	ITA	Mario Balotelli
67	MF	ANG	Edgar André
71	DF	SUI	Gilles Richard
76	FW	BRA	Itaitinga
90	DF	SUI	François Moubandje
97	DF	GLP	Dimitri Cavaré

=== Other players under contract ===
Note: Flags indicate national team as defined under FIFA eligibility rules; some limited exceptions apply. Players may hold more than one non-FIFA nationality.

No.	Pos.	Nation	Player
—	MF	BRA	Adryan

=== Out on loan ===
Note: Flags indicate national team as defined under FIFA eligibility rules; some limited exceptions apply. Players may hold more than one non-FIFA nationality.

No.	Pos.	Nation	Player
—	GK	SUI	Timothy Fayulu (at Winterthur)
—	DF	SUI	Sandro Theler (at Yverdon-Sport)

No.	Pos.	Nation	Player
—	FW	SUI	Théo Berdayes (at Yverdon-Sport)
—	MF	GBS	Mauro Rodrigues (at Yverdon-Sport)

== Pre-season and friendlies ==
Win Draw Loss

22 June 2022 Friendly	Sion (Switzerland)	1–1	(Switzerland) Neuchâtel Xamax	Ayent, Switzerland
18:00 CEST (UTC+2)	Clescenco 33'		Del Toro 23'	Stadium: Stade Saint-Jacques

25 June 2022 Friendly	Sion (Switzerland)	1–2	(Switzerland) Servette	Lens, Switzerland
16:00 CEST (UTC+2)	Sio 45'		Fofana 45'; Bedia 76'	Stadium: Stade du Christ-Roi

29 June 2022 Friendly	Yverdon (Switzerland)	1–2	(Switzerland) Sion	Yverdon-les-Bains, Switzerland
18:45 CEST (UTC+2)	Koné 57'		Benito 34'; Karlen 42'	Stadium: Stade Municipal

2 July 2022 Global Tour for Peace	Sion (Switzerland)	0–1	(Ukraine) Dynamo Kyiv	Savièse, Switzerland
18:00 CEST (UTC+2)			Vanat 35'	Stadium: Stade St-Germain; Attendance: 800

9 July 2022 Friendly	Strasbourg (France)	2–1	(Switzerland) Sion	Divonne-les-Bains, Switzerland
17:30 CEST (UTC+2)	Kandil 57'; Bellegarde 60'		Batata 32'	Stadium: Complexe sportif de Divonne-les-Bains

30 December 2022 Friendly	Thun (Switzerland)	2–1	(Switzerland) Sion	Thun, Switzerland
13:30 CET (UTC+1)				Stadium: Stockhorn Arena

8 January 2023 Friendly	VfB Stuttgart (Germany)	3–0	(Switzerland) Sion	Spain
15:00 CET (UTC+1)

13 January 2023 Friendly	Jablonec (Czech Republic)	0–1	(Switzerland) Sion	Estepona, Spain
15:00 CET (UTC+1)				Stadium: Campe de Futbol Atalaya Park Hotel

== Competitions ==
=== Overall record ===
Competition	First match	Last match	Starting round	Final position	Record							
Competition	First match	Last match	Starting round	Final position	Pld	W	D	L	GF	GA	GD	Win %
Swiss Super League	17 July 2022	May 2023	Matchday 1	10th	36	7	10	19	41	73	−32	19.44
Swiss Cup	20 August 2023	1 March 2023	Round 1	Quarter-finals	4	3	0	1	7	5	+2	75.00
Total					40	10	10	20	48	78	−30	25.00

Source: Soccerway

=== Swiss Super League ===
==== League table ====
Pos	Team	Pld	W	D	L	GF	GA	GD	Pts	Qualification or relegation
6	St. Gallen	36	11	12	13	66	52	+14	45	
7	Grasshopper	36	12	8	16	56	64	−8	44	
8	Zürich	36	10	14	12	41	55	−14	44	
9	Winterthur	36	8	8	20	32	66	−34	32	
10	Sion (R)	36	7	10	19	41	73	−32	31	Qualification for the relegation play-off

Source: Swiss Super League
Rules for classification: 1) Points; 2) Goal difference; 3) Goals scored; 4) Head-to-head goal difference; 5) Away goals scored; 6) Draw.
(R) Relegated

==== Results summary ====
Overall								Home						Away					
Pld	W	D	L	GF	GA	GD	Pts	W	D	L	GF	GA	GD	W	D	L	GF	GA	GD
5	2	2	1	8	7	+1	8	0	2	1	2	5	−3	2	0	0	6	2	+4

Source: Swiss Super League

==== Results by round ====
Round	1	2	3	4	5	6
Ground	A	H	H	A	H	A
Result	W	L	D	W	D	
Position						

Source: Swiss Super League
A = Away; H = Home; W = Win; D = Draw; L = Loss

==== Matches ====
The league fixtures were announced on 17 June 2022.

17 July 2022 1	Lugano	2–3	Sion	Cornaredo, Lugano
16;30	Daprelà (red card) 57'; Sabbatini 61'; De Queiroz 88'	SFL summary	43' (o.g.) Daprelà; 59' Cavaré; 85' Schmied	Attendance: 2,737; Referee: (Switzerland) Fedayi San; Assistant referees: (VAR) (Switzerland) Lionel Tschudi

24 July 2022 Round 2	Sion	0–3	Young Boys	Stade Tourbillon, Sion
16:30 CEST	Stojilković (yellow card) 11'; Cavaré (yellow card) 29'	SFL summary	Kanga 2' 6' (yellow card) 29'; Blum (yellow card) 73'; Nsame (yellow card) 82'; Ngamaleu 88'	Attendance: 8,500; Referee: (Switzerland) Alain Bieri; Assistant referees: (VAR) (Switzerland) Urs Schnyder

30 July 2022 Round 3	Sion	0–0	Servette	Stade Tourbillon, Sion
20:30 CET	Lavanchy (yellow card) 31'; Batata (yellow card) 36'; Saintini (yellow card) 86'; Lindner (yellow card) 90+3'	SFL summary	Rouiller (yellow card) 77'; Oberlin (yellow card) 90+7'	Attendance: 8,200; Referee: (Switzerland) Sven Wolfensberger; Assistant referees: (VAR) (Switzerland) Lionel Tschudi

7 August 2022 Round 4	Zürich	0–3	Sion	Letzigrund, Zürich
14:15 CEST	Gnonto (yellow card) 33'; Kryeziu (yellow card) 49'; Selnæs (yellow card) 87'	SFL summary	Grgić (yellow card) 12'; Itaitinga 57' 64'; Stojilković 68'	Attendance: 13,619; Referee: (Switzerland) Urs Schnyder; Assistant referees: (VAR) (Switzerland) Lionel Tschudi

13 August 2022 Round 5	Sion	2–2	Grasshopper	Stade Tourbillon, Sion
18:00 CEST (UTC+2)	Stojilkovic 22' (yellow card) 52'; Cavaré (red card) 54'; Araz (yellow card) 65'; Poha 67'	SFL summary	56' Ribeiro; 63' Dadashov; (yellow card) 74' Momoh; (yellow card) 83' Nadjack	Attendance: 8,400; Referee: (Switzerland) Stefan Horisberger; Assistant referees: (VAR) (Switzerland) Sascha Kever

27 August 2022 6	Luzern	2–0	Sion	Swissporarena, Luzern
18:00	Sorgić 2'; Sorgić 25'; Dräger (yellow card) 29' (yellow-red card) 87'; Frýdek (yellow card) 38' (yellow-red card) 42'; Simani (yellow card) 39'; Müller (yellow card) 59'; Gentner (yellow card) 88'	SFL summary	(yellow card) 17' Poha; (yellow card) 63' Karlen; (yellow card) 90+2' Sio; (yellow card) 90+4' Cavaré	Attendance: 10,067; Referee: (Switzerland) Alain Bieri (Solothurn); Assistant referees: (VAR) (Switzerland) Stephan Klossner

3 September 2022 7	Sion	2–1	Basel	Stade Tourbillon, Sion
18:00	Stojilković 17'; Batata (yellow card) 19'; Tramezzani (yellow card) 88'; Sio 89'; Bua (yellow card) 90+2'; Balotelli (yellow card) 90+3'	SFL summary	(yellow card) 50' Lang; 55' Burger; (yellow card) 62' Burger; (yellow card) 87' Comas	Attendance: 11,800; Referee: (Switzerland) Lukas Fähndrich; Assistant referees: (VAR) (Switzerland) Stefan Horisberger

10 September 2022 8	St. Gallen	1–2	Sion	Kybunpark, St. Gallen
18:00	Guillemenot (yellow card) 17'; Latte Lath (yellow card) 50'; Stillhart (yellow card) 62'; Karlen 87'; Görtler (yellow card) 90'	SFL report	18' Chouaref; 28' Stojilković; (yellow card) 54' Araz; (yellow card) 73' Sio; (yellow card) 89' Batata; (yellow card) 90+1' Grgić	Attendance: 18,579; Referee: (Switzerland) Luca Cibelli; Assistant referees: (VAR) (Switzerland) Stefan Horisberger

2 October 2022 Round 9	Sion	1–3	Winterthur	Stade Tourbillon, Sion
14:15	Ramizi (yellow card) 33'; Balotelli 45+4'; Batata (yellow card) 50'; Lavanchy (yellow card) 77'	SFL summary	(yellow card) 44' Poha; 45' (pen.) Buess; (yellow card) 45+2' Gelmi; 59' Ballet; (yellow card) 75' Ballet; 90+6' Kamberi	Attendance: 8,900; Referee: (Switzerland) Mirel Turkes; Assistant referees: (VAR) (Switzerland) Fedayi San

8 October 2022 Round 10	Grasshopper	4–4	Sion	Letzigrund, Zürich
18:00 CEST (UTC+2)	Ndenge 5'; Schettine 8'; Bolla 49'; Kawabe 69'	SFL summary	(yellow card) 4' Saintini; 34' (yellow card) 86' Stojilkovic; (yellow card) 52' Lavanchy; 75' Zuffi; 82' Balotelli; 84' Sio	Attendance: 4,474; Referee: (Switzerland) Anojen Kanagasingam; Assistant referees: (VAR) (Switzerland) Sandro Schärer

15 October 2023 11	Sion	2–0	Luzern	Stade Tourbillon, Sion
18:00	Balotelli 33'; Balotelli (yellow card) 64'; Araz 83'	SFL summary	(yellow card) 68' Beloko; (yellow card) 79' Simani	Attendance: 9,000; Referee: (Switzerland) Stefan Horisberger; Assistant referees: (VAR) (Switzerland) Stephan Klossner

18 October 2022 Round 12	Winterthur	1–0	Sion	Stadion Schützenwiese, Winterthur
20:30	Di Giusto 25'; Diaby (yellow card) 76'	SFL summary	(yellow card) 26' Batata	Attendance: 8,000; Referee: (Switzerland) Alessandro Dudic; Assistant referees: (VAR) (Switzerland) Sascha Kever

22 October 2022 Round 13	Young Boys	1–1	Sion	Stadion Wankdorf, Bern
18:00 CEST	Itten (yellow card) 48'; Nsame 64' (pen.)	SFL summary	Saintini (yellow card) 23'; Balotelli 53' (pen.); Schmied (yellow card) 64'; Cyprien (yellow card) 90+1'	Attendance: 27,767; Referee: (Switzerland) Urs Schnyder; Assistant referees: (VAR) (Switzerland) Lukas Fähndrich

30 October 2022 14	Sion	0–1	Zürich	Stade Tourbillon, Sion
14:15	Grgić (yellow card) 66'; Araz (yellow card) 73'; Lavanchy (yellow card) 90'; Karlen (yellow card) 90+2'; Poha (yellow card) 90+4'	SFL summary	8' Okita; (yellow card) 12' Katić; (yellow card) 36' Condé; (yellow card) 47' Tosin; (yellow card) 57' Kamberi; (yellow card) 78' Boranijašević; (yellow card) 83' Okita; (yellow card) 87' Guerrero	Attendance: 10,300; Referee: (Switzerland) Alessandro Dudic; Assistant referees: (VAR) (Switzerland) Alain Bieri

6 November 2022 15	Basel	0–0	Sion	St. Jakob-Park, Basel
16:30	Burger (yellow card) 45+3'	SFL summary FCB report	(yellow card) 45' (yellow-red card) 57' Baltazar (Costa); (yellow card) 45+3' Bua; (yellow card) 45+4' Balotelli; (yellow card) 65' Sio; (yellow card) 74' Araz	Attendance: 22,889; Referee: (Switzerland) Alain Bieri (Solothurn); Assistant referees: (VAR) (Switzerland) Fedayi San (Gebenstorf)

12 November 2022 16	Sion	2–7	St. Gallen	Stade Tourbillon, Sion
18:00	Balotelli 5' (pen.); Saintini (yellow card) 42'; Cavaré (yellow card) 53'; Zuffi (yellow card) 56'; Sio 90'; Halabaku (yellow card) 90+5'	SFL summary	(yellow card) 4' Guindo; 27' Latte Lath; (yellow card) 30' Quintillà; 31' Akolo; 39' Latte Lath; 43' Görtler; 44' Görtler; 50' Latte Lath; (yellow card) 52' Görtler; (yellow card) 55' Latte Lath; 60' Stillhart; (yellow card) 64' Stillhart; (yellow card) 90+5' Watkowiak	Attendance: 10,500; Referee: (Switzerland) Sven Wolfensberger

22 January 2023 17	Sion	2–3	Lugano	Stade Tourbillon, Sion
14:15	Poha (yellow card) 14'; Cyprien 24'; Araz (yellow card) 39'; Cyprien (yellow card) 58'; Doumbia (76])	SFL summary	3' Amoura; 33' Steffen; (yellow card) 40' Hajdari; (yellow card) 90+1' Mahmoud; 90+4' Celar	Attendance: 6,500; Referee: (Switzerland) Lukas Fähndrich; Assistant referees: (VAR) (Switzerland) Lionel Tschudi

29 January 2023 Round 18	Servette	2–2	Sion	Stade de Genève, Lancy
16:30 CET	Bedia 17' 33'; Kutsea (yellow card) 70'; Diallo (yellow card) 75'	SFL summary	Cavaré (yellow card) 26'; Grgić (yellow card) 30'; Cyprien (yellow card) 41' (yellow-red card) 41'; Sio 50'; Balotelli (yellow card) 84'; Douline 85' (o.g.)	Attendance: 14,592; Referee: (Switzerland) Urs Schnyder

5 February 2023 19	Sion	0–1	Zürich	Stade Tourbillon, Sion
14:15	Itaitinga (yellow card) 28'; Lavanchy (yellow card) 46'; Bua (yellow card) 53'; Sio (yellow card) 73'	SFL summary	(yellow card) 27' Omeragić; (yellow card) 36' Šimić; 59' Okita	Attendance: 7,600; Referee: (Switzerland) Esther Staubli; Assistant referees: (VAR) (Switzerland) Lionel Tschudi (Neuchâtel)

11 February 2023 20	Basel	3–1	Sion	St. Jakob-Park, Basel
20:30	Zeqiri 36'; Amdouni 61'; Novoa 70'	FCB report	15' Araz; (yellow card) 55' Lavanchy	Attendance: 19,522; Referee: (Switzerland) Fedayi San (Gebenstorf); Assistant referees: (VAR) (Switzerland) Sandro Schärer

18 February 2023 Round 21	Winterthur	1–1	Sion	Stadion Schützenwiese, Winterthur
18:00	Ramizi 17' (pen.); Gantenbein (yellow card) 41'; Ramizi (yellow card) 61'; Schmid (yellow card) 71'	SFL summary	(yellow card) 15' Schmied; (yellow card) 65' Moubandje; (yellow card) 72' Balotelli; 85' Sio	Attendance: 8,200; Referee: (Switzerland) Sven Wolfensberger; Assistant referees: (VAR) (Switzerland) Esther Staubli

25 February 2023 Round 22	Sion	0–4	St. Gallen	Stade Tourbillon, Sion
18:00	Araz (yellow card) 22'; Balotelli (yellow card) 36'	SFL summary	(yellow card) 26' Quintillà; 33' Akolo; 49' Stillhart; 60' Karlen; 69' (pen.) Guillemenot; (yellow card) 81' Guillemenot; (yellow card) 85' Maglica	Attendance: 7,300; Referee: (Switzerland) Stefan Horisberger; Assistant referees: (VAR) (Switzerland) Luca Cibelli

5 March 2023 23	Sion	1–1	Lugano	Stade Tourbillon, Sion
16:30	Poha (yellow card); Sio 66'; Chouaref (yellow card) 81'	SFL summary	34' Doumbia; (yellow card) 44' Steffen; (yellow card) 50' Hajrizi; (yellow card) 70' Valenzuela	Attendance: 4,800; Referee: (Switzerland) Urs Schnyder; Assistant referees: (VAR) (Switzerland) Fedayi San

11 March 2023 24	Young Boys	4–0	Sion	Kybunpark, St. Gallen
18:00	Elia 2'; Elia 38'; Blum (yellow card) 49'; Rieder 65'; Rieder 86'	SFL summary	(yellow card) 21' Chouaref	Attendance: 28,052; Referee: (Switzerland) Luca Cibelli; Assistant referees: (VAR) (Switzerland) Sascha Kever

18 March 2023 Round 25	Sion	1–2	Grasshopper	Stade Tourbillon, Sion
20:30 CET (UTC+1)	Itaitinga 37'; Lavanchy (yellow card) 60'; Iapichino (yellow card) 65'; Ziegler (yellow card) 84'; Balotelli (yellow card) 87'	SFL summary	22' Shabani; (yellow card) 32' (goal) 71' Schettine; (yellow card) 64' Ribeiro; (yellow card) 73' Kawabe	Attendance: 7,000; Referee: (Switzerland) Sven Wolfensberger; Assistant referees: (VAR) (Switzerland) Fedayi San

2 April 2023 26	Luzern	1–2	Sion	Swissporarena, Luzern
16:30	Jaquez (yellow card) 36'; Max Meyer (yellow card) 64' (yellow-red card) 65'; Frýdek 80'; Villiger (yellow card) 84'; Dorn (yellow card) 89'	SFL summary	(yellow card) 2' Ziegler; (yellow card) 36' Balotelli; 50' Sio; (yellow card) 61' Diouf; (yellow card) 75' Cavaré; 90+5' Bua	Attendance: 13,367; Referee: (Switzerland) Fedayi San; Assistant referees: (VAR) (Switzerland) Sandro Schärer

8 April 2023 Round 27	Sion	2–2	Servette	Stade Tourbillon, Sion
20:30	Grgić 34'; Itaitinga (yellow card) 36'; Lavanchy (yellow card) 44'; Itaitinga 56'; Grgić (yellow card) 90+3'	SFL summary	23' Crivelli; (yellow card) 33' Vouilloz; (yellow card) 46' Cognat; 69' Stevanović; (yellow card) 83' Stevanović	Attendance: 11,850; Referee: (Switzerland) Sven Wolfensberger; Assistant referees: (VAR) (Switzerland) Sandro Schärer

16 April 2023 Round 28	Grasshopper	1–3	Sion	Letzigrund, Zürich
16:30 CEST (UTC+2)	Shabani (red card) 39'; Ribeiro 63'	SFL summary	(yellow card) 14' (goal) 81' Cyprien; 45+2' Balotelli; 46' Sio; (yellow card) 54' Ziegler; (yellow card) 55' Grgic; (yellow card) 87' Fortuné	Attendance: 4,602; Referee: (Switzerland) Anojen Kanagasingam; Assistant referees: (VAR) (Switzerland) Sandro Schärer

23 April 2023 Round 29	Lugano	2–0	Sion	Cornaredo, Lugano
16:30	Steffen (yellow card) 9'; Mahmoud (yellow card) 73' (yellow-red card) 78'; Valenzuela 90'; Amoura 90+4'	SFL summary	(yellow card) 21' Schmied; (yellow card) 38' Cyprien; (yellow card) 49' (yellow-red card) 51' Zagré; (yellow card) 72' (yellow-red card) 90+3' Diouf; (yellow card) 89' Batata	Attendance: 3,005; Referee: (Switzerland) Esther Staubli; Assistant referees: (VAR) (Switzerland) Sandro Schärer

27 April 2023 Round 30	Sion	1–2	Basel	Stade Tourbillon, Sion
20:30	Bua (yellow card) 21'; Sio 45+2'; Batata (yellow card) 56'; Araz (yellow card) 63'	FCB report	17' Zeqiri; 40' Ndoye; (yellow card) 47' Pelmard; (yellow card) 85' López	Attendance: 7,800; Referee: (Switzerland) Lukas Fähndrich; Assistant referees: (VAR) (Switzerland) Sven Wolfensberger

30 April 2023 Round 31	Zürich	2–2	Sion	Letzigrund, Zürich
14:15	Condé (yellow card) 10'; Džemaili 25' (pen.); Kryeziu (yellow card) 60'; Džemaili 78' (pen.); Boranijašević (yellow card) 85'; Ligue (yellow card) 90+5'; Rohner (yellow card) 90+5'	SFL summary	20' Fortuné; (yellow card) 24' Ziegler; 44' Cyprien; (yellow card) 60' Karlen; (yellow card) 78' Sio; (yellow card) 90+5' Schmied	Attendance: 14,608; Referee: (Switzerland) Sven Wolfensberger; Assistant referees: (VAR) (Switzerland) Esther Staubli

6 May 2023 Round 32	Sion	0–1	Winterthur	Stade Tourbillon, Sion
18:00	Chouaref (yellow card) 16'; Balotelli (yellow card) 71'; Cyprien (yellow card) 78'	SFL summary	21' Burkart; (yellow card) 56' Kryeziu; Di Giusto (yellow card) 73'; Gonçalves (yellow card) 77'; Ltaief (yellow card) 88'	Attendance: 9,800; Referee: (Switzerland) Luca Cibelli; Assistant referees: (VAR) (Switzerland) Sascha Kever

13 May 2023 Round 33	Servette	5–0	Sion	Stade de Genève, Geneva
20:30	Pflücke 5'; Kutesa 8'; Clichy 9'; Stevanović 70'; Crivelli 85' (pen.)	SFL summary	(yellow card) 29' Karlen; (yellow card) 33' Costa	Attendance: 14,188; Referee: (Switzerland) Urs Schnyder; Assistant referees: (VAR) (Switzerland) Alessandro Dudic
