= 2024–25 FC Sion season =

FC Sion
2024–25 season
- Manager: Didier Tholot
- Stadium: Stade de Tourbillon
- Swiss Super League: 9th
- Swiss Cup: Round of 16
- Top goalscorer: Benjamin Kololli (8)
- Highest home attendance: 10,200 vs Lausanne-Sport
- Biggest win: Sion 4–0 Lausanne-Sport
- All statistics correct as of 21 May 2025.

The 2024–25 season was the 116th season in the history of FC Sion, and the club's first season back in the Swiss Super League. In addition to the domestic league, the team participated in the Swiss Cup.

== Transfers ==
=== In ===
Pos.	Player	Transferred from	Fee	Date	Source
MF	(Kosovo) Benjamin Kololli	(Switzerland) Basel	Undisclosed	1 January 2025	

== Friendlies ==
30 June 2024 Friendly	Sion (Switzerland)	1–3	(Portugal) Braga	Thonon-les-Bains, France
17:00	Berdayes 26'		Banza 13'; El Ouazzani 80'; Bambu 115'	Stadium: Stade Joseph-Moynat
Note: 4 x 30 minutes

5 July 2024 Friendly	Sion (Switzerland)	4–0	(Switzerland) Grasshopper	Le Bouveret
15:30				Stadium: Stade du Bouveret

10 July 2024 Friendly	Sion (Switzerland)	0–3	(Switzerland) Neuchâtel Xamax
16:00

13 July 2024 Friendly	Sion (Switzerland)	4–1	(Switzerland) Yverdon-Sport
17:00

24 July 2024 Friendly	Sion (Switzerland)	1–3	(Spain) Villarreal	Montreux
19:30	Souza 38'		Gueye 56'; Terrats 66'; Pino 78' (pen.)	Stadium: Stade Eugène-Parlier

5 January 2025 Friendly	COD Meknès (Morocco)	4–1	(Switzerland) Sion
13:00

5 January 2025 Friendly	Maghreb Fès (Morocco)	3–8	(Switzerland) Sion
15:30

10 January 2025 Friendly	FUS Rabat (Morocco)	1–0	(Switzerland) Sion
16:45

== Competitions ==
=== Overall record ===
Competition	First match	Last match	Starting round	Final position	Record							
Competition	First match	Last match	Starting round	Final position	Pld	W	D	L	GF	GA	GD	Win %
Swiss Super League	21 July 2024	22–24 May 2025	Matchday 1		3	2	0	1	6	2	+4	66.67
Swiss Cup	18 August 2024	4 December 2024	First round	Round of 16	0	0	0	0	0	0	+0	—
Total					3	2	0	1	6	2	+4	66.67

Last updated: 3 August 2024
Source: Soccerway

=== Swiss Super League ===
==== League table ====
Pos	Team	Pld	W	D	L	GF	GA	GD	Pts	Qualification or relegation (Note: Teams play each other three times (33 matches), before the league is split into two groups (the top six and the bottom six).)
7	Zürich	38	15	8	15	56	57	−1	53	
8	St. Gallen	38	13	13	12	52	53	−1	52	
9	Sion	38	11	11	16	47	57	−10	44	
10	Winterthur	38	11	7	20	43	68	−25	40	
11	Grasshopper (O)	38	9	12	17	43	53	−10	39	Qualification for the Relegation play-off

Source: Swiss Super League
Rules for classification: 1) Points; 2) Goal difference; 3) Goals scored; 4) Head-to-head goal difference; 5) Head-to-head goals scored 6) Away goals scored; 7) Draw.
(O) Play-off winners

==== Results summary ====
Overall								Home						Away					
Pld	W	D	L	GF	GA	GD	Pts	W	D	L	GF	GA	GD	W	D	L	GF	GA	GD
3	2	0	1	6	2	+4	6	1	0	0	4	0	+4	1	0	1	2	2	0

Last updated: 3 August 2024.

==== Results by round ====
Round	1	2	3
Ground	A	H	A
Result	W	W	L
Position	3		

Updated to match(es) played on 3 August 2024. Source:
A = Away; H = Home; W = Win; D = Draw; L = Loss

==== Matches ====
The match schedule was released on 18 June 2024.

21 July 2024 1	Young Boys	1–2	Sion	Bern
14:15	Ganvoula 16'; Hadjam (yellow card) 23' (yellow-red card) 59'; Husić (yellow card) 32'; Ugrinic (yellow card) 90+2'		Lavanchy (yellow card) 31'; Bouchlarhem (yellow card) 34'; Djokic 39'; Chouaref 66'; Fayulu (yellow card) 90+4'; Sorgić (yellow card) 90+6'	Stadium: Stadion Wankdorf; Attendance: 28,366; Referee: Alessandro Dudic

27 July 2024 2	Sion	4–0	Lausanne-Sport	Sion
18:00	Berdayes 7'; Kabacalman 10' (pen.); Souza 83'; Lavanchy 90'			Stadium: Stade de Tourbillon; Attendance: 10,200; Referee: Sven Wolfensberger

3 August 2024 3	Luzern	1–0	Sion	Luzern
20:30	Beloko 85'			Stadium: Swissporarena; Attendance: 10,430; Referee: Fedayi San

10 August 2024 4	Sion	2–0	Winterthur

24 August 2024 5	Grasshopper	3–1	Sion

31 August 2024 6	Sion	1–1	Basel	Stade Tourbillon, Sion
18:00	Chouaref 26'; Hefti (yellow card) 44'; Dejan Sorgić (yellow card) 87'	FCB report	5' Ajeti; (yellow card) 45+2' Avdullahu; (yellow card) 81' Carlos	Attendance: 13,200; Referee: (Switzerland) Stefan Horisberger

22 September 2024 7	Sion	0–0	Lugano	Sion
				Stadium: Stade de Tourbillon

29 September 2024 8	Zürich	1–0	Sion

5 October 2024 9	Sion	1–1	Yverdon-Sport	Sion
				Stadium: Stade de Tourbillon

19 October 2024 10	Servette	3–0	Sion

27 October 2024 11	Sion	2–2	St. Gallen	Sion
				Stadium: Stade de Tourbillon

30 October 2024 12	Sion	0–2	Zürich	Sion
				Stadium: Stade de Tourbillon

2 November 2024 13	St. Gallen	1–1	Sion

10 November 2024 14	Sion	4–2	Luzern	Sion
				Stadium: Stade de Tourbillon

23 November 2024 15	Lausanne-Sport	1–0	Sion

1 December 2024 16	Winterthur	1–3	Sion

7 December 2024 17	Sion	3–1	Young Boys	Sion
				Stadium: Stade de Tourbillon

14 December 2024 18	Yverdon-Sport	0–1	Sion

18 January 2025 19	Sion	0–1	Grasshopper	Sion
				Stadium: Stade de Tourbillon

26 January 2025 20	Basel	4–1	Sion

1 February 2025 21	Lugano	3–2	Sion

4 February 2025 22	Servette	3–3	Sion

8 February 2025 23	Young Boys	5–1	Sion

15 February 2025 24	Sion	2–1	Zürich	Sion
				Stadium: Stade de Tourbillon

23 February 2025 25	Luzern	2–1	Sion

1 March 2025 26	Basel	2–0	Sion	St. Jakob-Park, Basel
18:00	Avdullahu (yellow card) 1'; Kololli 17' (o.g.); Shaqiri 25'; Otele (yellow card) 29'; Leroy (yellow card) 83'	FCB report		Attendance: 22,298; Referee: (Switzerland) Sven Wolfensberger
Note: 7' goal from Bouriga disallowed due to off-side. 79' shot against crossbar from van Breemen. 88' shot against crossbar from Sorgić

9 March 2025 27	Sion	2–1	Lugano	Sion
				Stadium: Stade de Tourbillon

16 March 2025 28	Grasshopper	1–1	Sion

29 March 2025 29	Sion	1–1	Yverdon	Sion
				Stadium: Stade de Tourbillon

2 April 2025 30	Sion	1–2	Winterthur	Sion
				Stadium: Stade de Tourbillon

5 April 2025 31	Lausanne-Sport	2–0	Sion	Lausanne
18:00	Diabaté 90+6'; Kana-Biyik 90+8'			Stadium: Stade de la Tuiliere

13 April 2025 32	Sion	1–1	Servette	Sion
16:30	Lavanchy 65'		Ndoye 69'	Stadium: Stade de Tourbillon

21 April 2025 33	St. Gallen	1–0	Sion	St. Gallen
16:30	Geubbels 49'			Stadium: Kybunpark

=== Swiss Cup ===
17 August 2024 First round	Delémont	1–1 (a.e.t.) (1–4 p)	Sion

13 September 2024 Second round	YF Juventus	0–2	Sion

4 December 2024 Third Round	Basel	2–2 (a.e.t.) (4–1 p)	Sion	St. Jakob-Park, Basel
20:15	Shaqiri 5'; Vouilloz (yellow card) 40'; Kade 86'	Report	30' Bouchlarhem; 38' Bouchlarhem; (yellow card) 42' Chouaref; (yellow card) 51'Bouchlarhem; (yellow card) 98' Batata; (yellow card) 101' Kabacalman	Attendance: 16,301; Referee: (Switzerland) Sandro Schärer
	Penalties
	Shaqiri (penalty scored); Kade (penalty scored); Carlos (penalty scored); Fink (penalty scored)		(penalty missed) Souza; (penalty missed) Schmied; (penalty scored) Batata
