= 2021–22 Swiss Super League =

125th season of top-tier Swiss football

Swiss Super League
- Season: 2021–22
- Dates: 24 July 2021 – 22 May 2022
- Champions: Zürich; 13th title
- Relegated: Lausanne
- Champions League: Zürich
- Europa Conference League: Basel; Young Boys; Lugano
- Matches: 180
- Goals: 585 (3.25 per match)
- Top goalscorer: Jordan Pefok (22 goals)
- Biggest home win: 6–1 (m1 Aug 2021) (Basel v. Sion)
- Biggest away win: 0–6 (3 Oct 2021) (Servette v. Young Boys)
- Highest scoring: 6–2 (3 Oct 2021) (Zürich v. Sion)
- Longest winning run: 9 – Zürich (7 Nov 2021-13 Feb 2022)
- Longest unbeaten run: 17 – Zürich (3 Oct 2021-5 Mar 2022)
- Longest winless run: 13 – Lausanne-Sport (28 Nov 2021-20 Mar 2022)
- Longest losing run: 9 – Lausanne-Sport (11 Dec 2021-5 Mar 2022)
- Highest attendance: 33,810 (01 May 2022) (Zürich v. Basel)
- Total attendance: 2,049,802
- Average attendance: 11,388

The 2021–22 Swiss Super League (referred to as the Credit Suisse Super League for sponsoring reasons) was the 125th season of top-tier competitive football in Switzerland and the 19th under its current name and format.

A total of ten teams competed in the league: the eight best teams from the 2020–21 season, the 2020–21 Swiss Challenge League champions Grasshopper Club Zürich and relegation play-off winners Sion. Young Boys were the four-time defending champions.

== Teams ==
=== Stadia and locations ===
Location of the 2020–21 Swiss Super League teams

Club	Location	Stadium	Capacity	Ref
Basel	Basel	St. Jakob-Park	37,994	
Grasshopper Club Zürich	Zürich	Letzigrund	26,104	
Lausanne-Sport	Lausanne	Stade de la Tuilière	12,544	
Lugano	Lugano	Stadio Cornaredo	6,390	
Luzern	Lucerne	Swissporarena	16,490	
Servette	Geneva	Stade de Genève	28,833	
Sion	Sion	Stade Tourbillon	14,283	
St. Gallen	St. Gallen	Kybunpark	19,456	
Young Boys	Bern	Stadion Wankdorf	31,789	
Zürich	Zürich	Letzigrund	26,104	

=== Personnel and kits ===
Team	Manager	Captain	Kit manufacturer	Shirt sponsor
Basel	(Spain) Guille Abascal	(Switzerland) Valentin Stocker	Adidas	Novartis
Grasshoppers	(Switzerland) Giorgio Contini	(Albania) Amir Abrashi	Adidas	none
Lausanne-Sport	(France) Alain Casanova	(Croatia) Stjepan Kukuruzović	Le Coq Sportif	BCV
Lugano	(Switzerland) Mattia Croci-Torti	(Uruguay) Jonathan Sabbatini	Acerbis	AIL; Swiss4Win.ch
Luzern	(Liechtenstein) Mario Frick	(Switzerland) Dejan Sorgić	Craft	Otto's
Servette	(Switzerland) Alain Geiger	(Switzerland) Anthony Sauthier	Puma	La Praille; M3 Groupe
Sion	(Italy) Paolo Tramezzani	(Ivory Coast) Serey Dié	Macron	Alloboissons; A. Repond SA
St. Gallen	(Germany) Peter Zeidler	(Germany) Lukas Görtler	Jako	St.Galler Kantonalbank
Young Boys	(Switzerland) Matteo Vanetta	(Switzerland) Fabian Lustenberger	Nike	Plus500
Zürich	(Germany) André Breitenreiter	(Switzerland) Yanick Brecher	Nike	none

=== Managerial changes ===
Team	Outgoing manager	Manner of departure	Date of departure	Position in table	Incoming manager	Date of appointment	Ref.
FC Lugano	(Brazil) Abel Braga	Termination	1 September 2021	7	(Switzerland) Mattia Croci-Torti	2 September 2021	
FC Sion	(Switzerland) Marco Walker	Termination	8 October 2021	7	(Italy) Paolo Tramezzani	9 October 2021	
FC Luzern	(Switzerland) Fabio Celestini	Termination	22 November 2021	10	(Switzerland) Sandro Chieffo (interim)	22 November 2022	
FC Luzern	(Switzerland) Sandro Chieffo	End of interim period	20 December 2021	10	(Liechtenstein) Mario Frick	20 December 2021	
FC Lausanne-Sport	(Serbia) Ilija Borenovic	Termination	2 February 2022	9	(France) Alain Casanova	3 February 2022	
FC Basel	(Switzerland) Patrick Rahmen	Termination	21 February 2022	3	(Spain) Guille Abascal (interim)	21 February 2022	
BSC Young Boys	(United States) David Wagner	Termination	7 March 2022	2	(Switzerland) Matteo Vanetta (interim)	7 March 2022	

== League table ==
Pos	Team	Pld	W	D	L	GF	GA	GD	Pts	Qualification or relegation
1	Zürich (C)	36	23	7	6	78	46	+32	76	Qualification for Champions League second qualifying round
2	Basel	36	15	17	4	70	41	+29	62	Qualification for Europa Conference League second qualifying round
3	Young Boys	36	16	12	8	80	50	+30	60	Qualification for Europa Conference League second qualifying round
4	Lugano	36	16	6	14	50	54	−4	54	Qualification for Europa Conference League third qualifying round (Note: Lugano qualified for the Europa Conference League third qualifying round as the 2021–22 Swiss Cup champions.)
5	St. Gallen	36	14	8	14	68	63	+5	50	
6	Servette	36	12	8	16	50	66	−16	44	
7	Sion	36	11	8	17	46	67	−21	41	
8	Grasshopper	36	9	13	14	54	58	−4	40	
9	Luzern (O)	36	9	13	14	52	64	−12	40	Qualification for Relegation play-offs
10	Lausanne-Sport (R)	36	4	10	22	37	76	−39	22	Relegation to Swiss Challenge League

Source: Swiss Super League
Rules for classification: 1) Points; 2) Goal difference; 3) Goals scored; 4) Head-to-head goal difference; 5) Away goals scored; 6) Draw.
(C) Champions; (O) Play-off winners; (R) Relegated

== Results ==
=== First and Second Rounds ===
Home \ Away	BAS	GRA	LAU	LUG	LUZ	SER	SIO	StG	YB	ZÜR
Basel	—	2–2	1–1	2–0	1–1	5–1	6–1	0–1	1–1	3–1
Grasshopper	0–2	—	3–1	0–1	1–1	1–1	3–1	5–2	1–1	3–3
Lausanne-Sport	2–2	3–1	—	0–2	1–1	0–3	1–1	1–2	1–6	1–3
Lugano	1–1	1–1	2–0	—	3–1	2–1	2–0	2–1	0–5	0–2
Luzern	1–3	1–1	1–1	2–3	—	0–2	0–1	2–0	3–4	1–3
Servette	2–2	3–2	1–1	0–2	4–1	—	1–2	5–1	0–6	1–2
Sion	0–1	1–3	2–0	3–2	1–1	1–2	—	3–1	1–0	0–1
St. Gallen	0–2	0–4	0–1	1–1	2–2	2–1	1–1	—	3–1	3–3
Young Boys	1–1	0–0	3–2	3–1	1–1	1–2	4–3	2–1	—	4–0
Zürich	3–3	2–1	3–1	1–0	4–0	2–2	6–2	3–1	1–0	—

Source: Swiss Super League (in German)
Legend: Blue = home team win; Yellow = draw; Red = away team win.

=== Third and Fourth Rounds ===
Home \ Away	BAS	GRA	LAU	LUG	LUZ	SER	SIO	StG	YB	ZÜR
Basel	—	1–1	3–0	2–1	3–0	2–0	3–3	2–2	2–2	0–2
Grasshopper	2–4	—	3–1	1–2	2–2	2–4	0–1	3–2	2–2	1–3
Lausanne-Sport	0–0	0–2	—	4–1	1–2	4–1	1–2	1–5	2–2	0–2
Lugano	0–2	1–1	3–1	—	2–1	2–0	1–3	0–2	3–1	2–1
Luzern	0–3	1–0	3–0	2–2	—	4–0	1–0	3–2	2–2	0–2
Servette	0–0	0–1	1–0	2–2	1–1	—	2–1	0–2	1–0	1–0
Sion	0–0	2–0	1–0	0–3	1–3	3–3	—	0–3	1–2	1–1
St. Gallen	2–2	2–0	4–0	3–0	3–2	5–1	1–1	—	3–3	1–2
Young Boys	3–1	3–0	2–2	1–0	2–2	3–1	3–1	4–1	—	1–2
Zürich	4–2	1–1	2–2	3–0	2–3	1–0	5–1	0–3	2–1	—

Source: Swiss Super League (in German)
Legend: Blue = home team win; Yellow = draw; Red = away team win.

== Relegation play-offs ==
The ninth-placed team of the Super League played the runners-up of the Challenge League. The games were held on 26 and 29 May 2022, respectively. The runner-up of the Challenge League hosted the first game.

FC Schaffhausen was confirmed as the runner-up of the Challenge League on 21 May 2022. On 22 May, FC Luzern was confirmed as their opponent.

=== First leg ===
26 May 2022
18:00

FC Schaffhausen	2–2	FC Luzern
Bobadilla 14'; Del Toro 71'	Report	Schulz 4' (pen.); Jashari 53'

wefox Arena, Schaffhausen
Attendance: 8,143
Referee: Fedayi San

=== Second leg ===
29 May 2022
16:30

FC Luzern	2–0	FC Schaffhausen
Schulz 20' (pen.); Ugrinic 70'	Report

Swissporarena, Lucerne
Attendance: 15,500
Referee: Sandro Schärer

FC Luzern wins 4–2 on aggregate.

== Statistics ==
=== Players ===
- Player in italic is no longer part of the Super League.

==== Top scorers ====
Rank	Nat	Player	Club	Goals
1	(United States)	Jordan Pefok	BSC Young Boys	22
2	(The Gambia)	Assan Ceesay	FC Zürich	20
3	(Switzerland)	Kwadwo Duah	FC St. Gallen	15
4	(Brazil)	Arthur Cabral	FC Basel (Note: Joined Fiorentina on 29 January 2022.)	14
5	(Switzerland)	Antonio Marchesano	FC Zürich	13
6	(France)	Wilfried Kanga	BSC Young Boys	12
6	(Switzerland)	Zeki Amdouni	FC Lausanne-Sport	12
8	(Switzerland)	Kastriot Imeri	Servette FC	11
8	(Switzerland)	Christian Fassnacht	BSC Young Boys	11
8	(Switzerland)	Filip Stojilkovic	FC Sion	11

Last updated: 22 May 2022
Source: Torschützenliste 2021/22

==== Assists ====
Rank	Nat	Player	Club	Assists
1	(Bosnia and Herzegovina)	Miroslav Stevanović	Servette FC	20
2	(Spain)	Adrià Guerrero	FC Zürich	11
3	(The Gambia)	Assan Ceesay	FC Zürich	10
4	(Germany)	Lukas Görtler	FC St. Gallen	9
4	(Spain)	Víctor Ruiz	FC St. Gallen	9
4	(Albania)	Ermir Lenjani	Grasshopper Club Zürich	8
4	(Slovenia)	Sandi Lovrić	FC Lugano	8
8	(Democratic Republic of the Congo)	Meschak Elia	BSC Young Boys	7
8	(Cameroon)	Moumi Ngamaleu	BSC Young Boys	7
8	(Switzerland)	Anto Grgić	FC Sion	7
8	(Switzerland)	Filip Ugrinic	FC Luzern	7
8	(Switzerland)	Numa Lavanchy	FC Lugano	7
8	(Switzerland)	Fabian Rieder	BSC Young Boys	7
8	(Germany)	Mohamed Dräger	FC Luzern	7

Last updated: 22 May 2022
Source: Assistliste 2021/22

==== Cards ====
Rank	Nat	Player	Club	Booking (1 pt)	Second booking (3 pts)	Straight Red (5 pts)	Pts
1	(Germany)	Marvin Schulz	FC Luzern	10	1	1	18
2	(France)	Vincent Sasso	Servette FC	12	0	1	17
3	(Brazil)	Batata	FC Sion	7	1	1	15
4	(Switzerland)	Jérémy Guillemenot	FC St. Gallen	8	0	1	13
4	(Switzerland)	Olivier Custodio	FC Lugano	13	0	0	13
6	(Germany)	Lukas Görtler	FC St. Gallen	12	0	0	12
7	(Slovakia)	Christián Herc	Grasshopper Club Zürich|	8	1	0	11
8	(France)	Hicham Mahou	FC Lausanne-Sport	7	1	0	10
8	(Kosovo)	Mirlind Kryeziu	FC Zürich	10	0	0	10
8	(Luxembourg)	Christopher Martins	BSC Young Boys (Note: Loaned to Spartak Moscow on 31 January 2022.)	4	2	0	10

Last updated: 22 May 2022
Source: Karten 2021/22

==== Clean sheets ====
Rank	Nat	Player	Club	#
1	(Austria)	Heinz Lindner	FC Basel	12
2	(Switzerland)	Yanick Brecher	FC Zürich	10
3	(Ghana)	Lawrence Ati-Zigi	FC St. Gallen	7
4	(Switzerland)	Jérémy Frick	Servette FC	5
4	(Switzerland)	Kevin Fickentscher	FC Sion	5
6	(Germany)	Marius Müller	FC Luzern	4
6	(Switzerland)	Amir Saipi	FC Lugano	4
6	(Portugal)	André Moreira	Grasshopper Club Zürich	4
9	(Switzerland)	David von Ballmoos	BSC Young Boys	3
10	(France)	Mory Diaw	FC Lausanne-Sport	2
10	(Switzerland)	Noam Baumann	FC Lugano	2
10	(Switzerland)	Guillaume Faivre	BSC Young Boys	2

Last updated: 22 May 2022
Source: Matchcenter

=== Teams ===
==== Attendance ====
Rank	Club	Average	Highest	Lowest	Total
1	Young Boys	24,821	31,120	19,973	446,771
2	Basel	21,920	33,810	15,112	394,561
3	St. Gallen	15,514	18,861	9,800	279,257
4	Zürich	13,396	22,413	5,433	241,124
5	Luzern	10,575	13,491	7,685	190,355
6	Sion	6,983	11,000	3,500	125,700
7	Servette	6,902	11,348	3,225	124,229
8	Grasshopper	5,767	16,112	2,550	103,800
9	Lausanne	5,066	12,150	2,745	91,184
10	Lugano	2,935	5,093	2,098	52,821
League total		11,388	33,810	2,098	2,049,802

Last updated: 1 June 2022
Source: Zuschauer

==== Fair Play ====
On 1 June 2022, FC Lugano was awarded the Fair Play Trophy for the Credit Suisse Super League.

Rank	Club	Booking (1 pt)	Second booking (3 pts)	Straight Red (5 pts)	Pts
1	Lugano	85	1	1	93
2	Zürich	92	1	0	95
3	Young Boys	81	5	0	96
4	Servette	76	3	3	100
5	Luzern	82	3	2	101
6	Basel	84	3	2	103
7	Grasshopper	92	3	1	106
8	Sion	90	1	3	108
9	St. Gallen	80	5	3	110
10	Lausanne	106	5	1	126
League Total		868	30	16	1038
Average/game		4.82	0.167	0.0889	5.77

Last updated: 1 June 2022
Source: Fair Play Trophy Credit Suisse Super League
