= Georgi Rusev (footballer) =

Bulgarian footballer (born 1998)

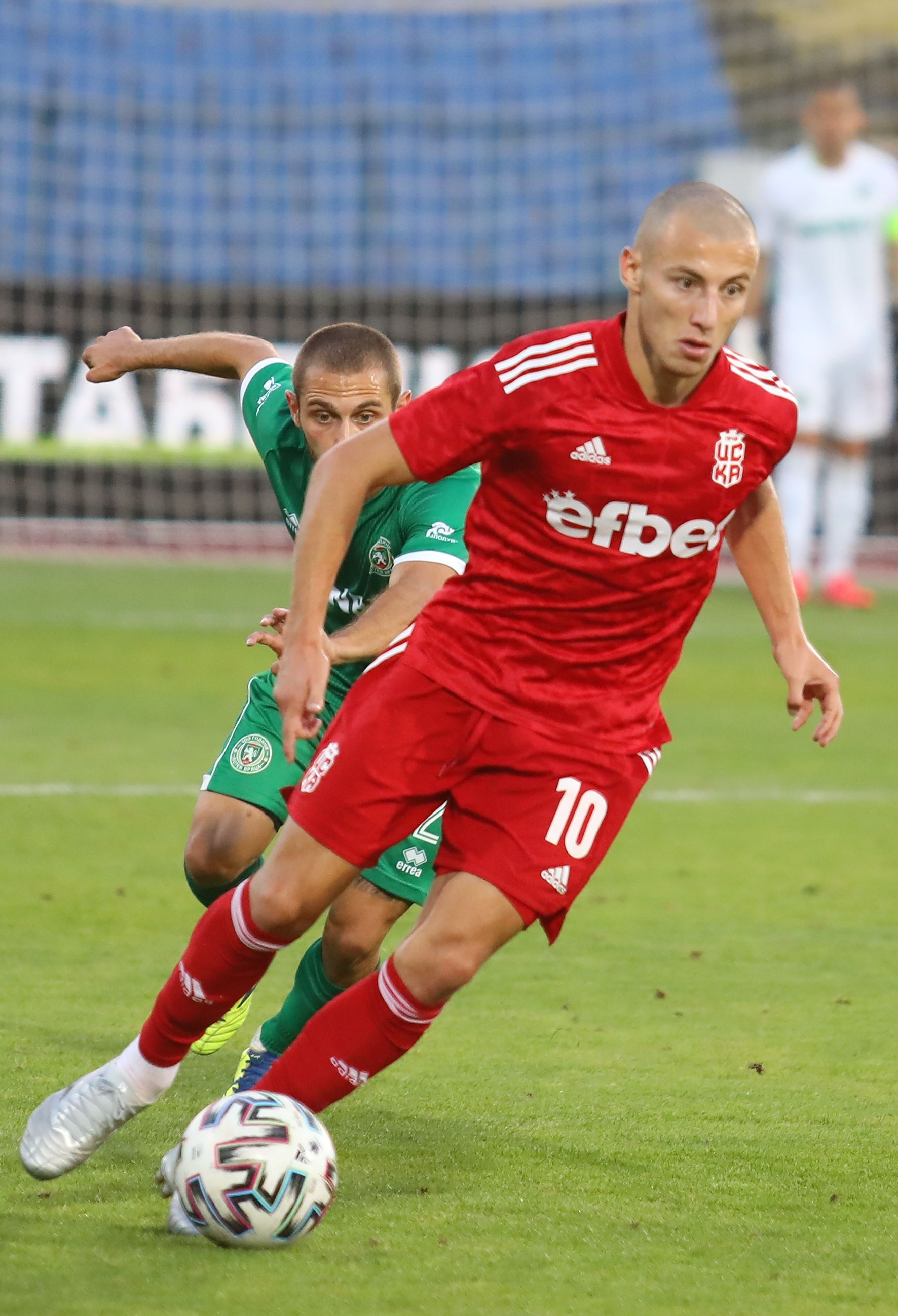

Personal information
- Full name: Georgi Rusenov Rusev
- Date of birth: 2 July 1998 (age 28)
- Place of birth: Stara Zagora, Bulgaria
- Height: 1.75 m (5 ft 9 in)
- Position: Winger

Team information
- Current team: CSKA 1948
- Number: 11

Youth career
- –2016: DIT Sofia
- 2016–2017: Elche

Senior career*
Years	Team	Apps	(Gls)
2017	Elche B	5	(0)
2017–2018	Getafe B	4	(0)
2018–2020	Septemvri Sofia	39	(9)
2020–2023	CSKA 1948	108	(21)
2023	CSKA 1948 II	1	(2)
2024–2025	Sion	20	(2)
2024–2025	→ Ludogorets (loan)	23	(1)
2024–2025	→ Ludogorets II (loan)	1	(0)
2025–	CSKA 1948	40	(3)

International career^{‡}
2015	Bulgaria U17	8	(0)
2016–2017	Bulgaria U19	8	(2)
2017–2020	Bulgaria U21	13	(0)
2022–	Bulgaria	29	(4)
- * Club domestic league appearances and goals as of 5 November 2026 ‡ National team caps and goals as of 20:11, 16 November 2026 (UTC)

Georgi Rusenov Rusev (Bulgarian: Георги Русенов Русев; born 2 July 1998) is a Bulgarian professional footballer who plays as a winger for First League club CSKA 1948 Sofia.

== Club career ==
Rusev started his youth career with the academy of DIT Sofia before moving to the academy of Spanish club Elche CF in 2016. On 27 August, he made his debut for the B-team, starting in a 1–0 defeat against CD Castellón. After being rarely used, he joined the reserve team of Getafe CF on 14 December 2017. On 5 June 2018, he returned to Bulgaria and joined Septemvri Sofia. On 23 July, he made his debut for the club in a 0–0 draw against FC Vereya.

On 29 December 2023, Sion announced they had signed Rusev for an undisclosed fee, with Rusev joining the team on 2 January 2024.

On 13 August 2024, Rusev joined Ludogorets on loan, being regarded as an emergency option for the team's offense following the serious injury suffered by Bernard Tekpetey.

== International career ==
Rusev featured for the under-17 team in the 2015 UEFA European Under-17 Championship. He also represented the under-19 team in the 2017 UEFA European Under-19 Championship and scored the only goal of team in the tournament against Netherlands.

Rusev received his first call-up for the Bulgaria national team on 5 September 2022, for the games of the UEFA Nations League games against Gibraltar and North Macedonia on 23 and 23 September 2022. He completed his debut in the match against Gibraltar on 23 September, won by Bulgaria with 5:1 result.

== Career statistics ==
=== Club ===
As of match played on 20 September 2025

Club	Season	League			Cup		Europe		Other		Total	
Club	Season	Division	Apps	Goals	Apps	Goals	Apps	Goals	Apps	Goals	Apps	Goals
Elche B	2017–18	Tercera División	5	0	—		—		—		5	0
Getafe B	2017–18	Tercera División	4	0	—		—		—		4	0
Septemvri Sofia	2018–19	First League	21	0	4	1	—		3	0	28	1
Septemvri Sofia	2019–20	Second League	18	9	2	1	—		1	0	21	10
Septemvri Sofia	Total		39	9	6	2	0	0	4	0	49	11
CSKA 1948	2020–21	First League	24	6	2	0	—		—		26	6
CSKA 1948	2021–22	First League	32	5	1	0	—		—		33	5
CSKA 1948	2022–23	First League	34	6	5	1	—		—		39	7
CSKA 1948	2023–24	First League	18	4	2	1	—		2	0	22	5
CSKA 1948	Total		108	21	10	2	0	0	2	0	120	23
CSKA 1948 II	2023–24	Second League	1	2	0	0	—		—		1	2
Sion	2023–24	Swiss Challenge League	17	2	0	0	—		—		17	2
Sion	2024–25	Swiss Super League	3	0	0	0	—		—		3	0
Sion	Total		20	2	0	0	0	0	0	0	20	2
Ludogorets Razgrad (loan)	2024–25	First League	23	1	6	1	4	0	1	0	35	2
Ludogorets Razgrad II (loan)	2024–25	Second League	2	0	—		—		—		2	0
CSKA 1948 (loan)	2025–26	First League	9	1	0	0	—		—		9	1
Career total			211	36	22	4	4	0	7	0	245	42

=== International ===
As of match played 16 November 2026

Appearances and goals by national team and year
National team	Year	Apps	Goals
Bulgaria	2022	4	0
Bulgaria	2023	10	1
Bulgaria	2024	4	0
Bulgaria	2025	3	1
Bulgaria	2026	8	2
Total		29	4

=== International goals ===
Scores and results list Bulgaria's goal tally first.

No.	Date	Venue	Opponent	Score	Result	Competition
1.	19 November 2023	Dubočica Stadium, Leskovac, Serbia	Serbia	1–1	2–2	UEFA Euro 2024 qualification
2.	18 November 2025	Vasil Levski National Stadium, Sofia, Bulgaria	Georgia	1–0	2–1	2026 FIFA World Cup qualification
3.	27 March 2026	Gelora Bung Karno Stadium, Jakarta, Indonesia	Solomon Islands	7–1	10–2	2026 FIFA Series
4.	5 June 2026	Stadionul Zimbru, Chișinău, Moldova	Moldova	1–0	2–2	Friendly

== Honours ==
Individual

- Bulgarian First League top assists provider: 2021–22,
