= Sandro Theler =

Swiss footballer (born 2000)

Personal information
- Date of birth: 15 December 2000 (age 25)
- Place of birth: Brig-Glis, Switzerland
- Height: 1.75 m (5 ft 9 in)
- Position: Defender

Youth career
- 2008–2013: Brig-Glis
- 2013–2014: Saxon Sports
- 2014–2018: Sion

Senior career*
Years	Team	Apps	(Gls)
2017–2024	Sion II	43	(1)
2019–2024	Sion	36	(1)
2022–2023	→ Yverdon (loan)	13	(0)
2024	Aarau	6	(0)

International career
2014	Switzerland U15	1	(0)
2015–2016	Switzerland U16	5	(1)
2017	Switzerland U17	2	(0)
- * Club domestic league appearances and goals as of 28 May 2024

Sandro Theler (born 15 December 2000) is a Swiss professional footballer who plays as a defender.

== Career ==
=== Early life and youth career ===
Born in Brig-Glis, Switzerland, Theler began his career from the youth team of FC Sion, where he had featured for the clubs' under-21 division from 2016 to 2019.

=== Sion ===
==== 2019–20 ====
Theler signed his first senior contract with the Swiss top-tier club FC Sion on 2019. He would represent for the club in the 2019-20 Swiss Super League season. Theler played his debut match for the club against FC Basel on 28 June 2020 as a substitute for Dimitri Cavaré on the 50th minute of the game, which ended 2–0 to Basel. Theler scored his debut goal for the club in his last match of the season against FC Luzern on 22 July 2020 in the 31st minute of the game. The match ended 1–2 to Sion.

==== 2020–21 ====
Theler stayed with the club for the 2020-21 Swiss Super League season. Theler played his first match of the season against defending champions BSC Young Boys on 26 September 2020 as a substitute on the stoppage time for Dennis Iapichino. The match ended on a 0–0 draw. Theler played his Swiss Cup debut against FC Schötz on 12 September 2020 as a substitute for Batata in the stoppage time of the game which ended 0–3 to Sion.

=== Aarau ===
On 1 February 2024, Theler signed with Aarau until the end of the 2023–24 season.

== Career statistics ==
As of match played 1 February 2021

Club	Season	League			Cup		Continental		Total	
Club	Season	Division	Apps	Goals	Apps	Goals	Apps	Goals	Apps	Goals
FC Sion	2019–20	Swiss Super League	5	1	0	0	–	–	5	1
FC Sion	2020–21	Swiss Super League	10	0	1	0	–	–	11	0
Career total			15	1	1	0	0	0	16	1
