= Joël Schmied =

Swiss footballer (born 1998)

Personal information
- Full name: Joël Pascal Schmied
- Date of birth: 23 September 1998 (age 28)
- Place of birth: Bern, Switzerland
- Height: 1.88 m (6 ft 2 in)
- Position: Centre-back

Team information
- Current team: 1. FC Köln
- Number: 2

Youth career
- FC Bolligen
- FC Schönbühl
- 2014–2016: Young Boys

Senior career*
Years	Team	Apps	(Gls)
2016–2020	Young Boys U21	2	(1)
2018	→ Breitenrain (loan)	13	(0)
2018–2019	→ Rapperswil-Jona (loan)	18	(1)
2019–2020	→ Wil 1900 (loan)	36	(3)
2020–2021	Vaduz	35	(8)
2021–2025	Sion	82	(9)
2025–	1. FC Köln	33	(0)

International career
2014	Switzerland U16	1	(0)
2017	Switzerland U19	1	(0)
2018	Switzerland U20	2	(0)
- * Club domestic league appearances and goals as of 1 November 2026

Joël Pascal Schmied (born 23 September 1998) is a Swiss professional footballer who plays as a centre-back for German Bundesliga club 1. FC Köln.

== Club career ==
On 13 January 2025, Schmied signed a four-and-a-half-year contract with 1. FC Köln in German 2. Bundesliga.

== Career statistics ==
As of match played 1 November 2026

Appearances and goals by club, season and competition
Club	Season	League			National cup (Note: Includes Swiss Cup, DFB-Pokal)		Europe		Other		Total	
Club	Season	Division	Apps	Goals	Apps	Goals	Apps	Goals	Apps	Goals	Apps	Goals
Young Boys	2016–17	1. Liga Classic	12	0	—		—		—		12	0
Young Boys	2017–18	1. Liga Classic	27	1	—		—		—		27	1
Young Boys	Total		39	1	—		—		—		39	1
Breitenrain (loan)	2018–19	Swiss Promotion League	13	0	2	0	—		—		15	0
Rapperswil-Jona (loan)	2018–19	Swiss Challenge League	18	1	—		—		—		18	1
Wil 1900 (loan)	2019–20	Swiss Challenge League	36	3	2	0	—		—		38	3
Vaduz	2020–21	Swiss Super League	32	7	0	0	—		—		32	7
Vaduz	2021–22	Swiss Challenge League	3	1	0	0	2 (Note: Appearances in UEFA Conference League)	0	—		5	1
Vaduz	Total		35	8	0	0	2	0	—		37	8
Sion	2021–22	Swiss Super League	6	0	1	0	—		—		7	0
Sion	2022–23	Swiss Super League	24	1	2	0	—		—		26	1
Sion	2023–24	Swiss Challenge League	34	5	5	0	—		—		39	5
Sion	2024–25	Swiss Challenge League	18	3	3	0	—		—		21	3
Sion	Total		82	9	11	0	—		—		93	9
1. FC Köln	2024–25	Bundesliga	12	0	1	0	—		—		13	0
1. FC Köln	2025–26	Bundesliga	16	0	2	0	—		—		18	0
1. FC Köln	2026–27	Bundesliga	5	0	2	0	—		—		7	0
1. FC Köln	Total		33	0	5	0	—		—		38	0
Career total			256	22	20	0	2	0	0	0	278	22

== Honours ==
1.FC Koln

- 2. Bundesliga: 2024–25
