= Edgar André =

Edgar André may refer to:

- Edgar André (politician) (1894–1936), German politician
- Edgar André (footballer) (born 1999), Swiss footballer
