= Ilyas Chouaref =

Maltese footballer (born 2000)

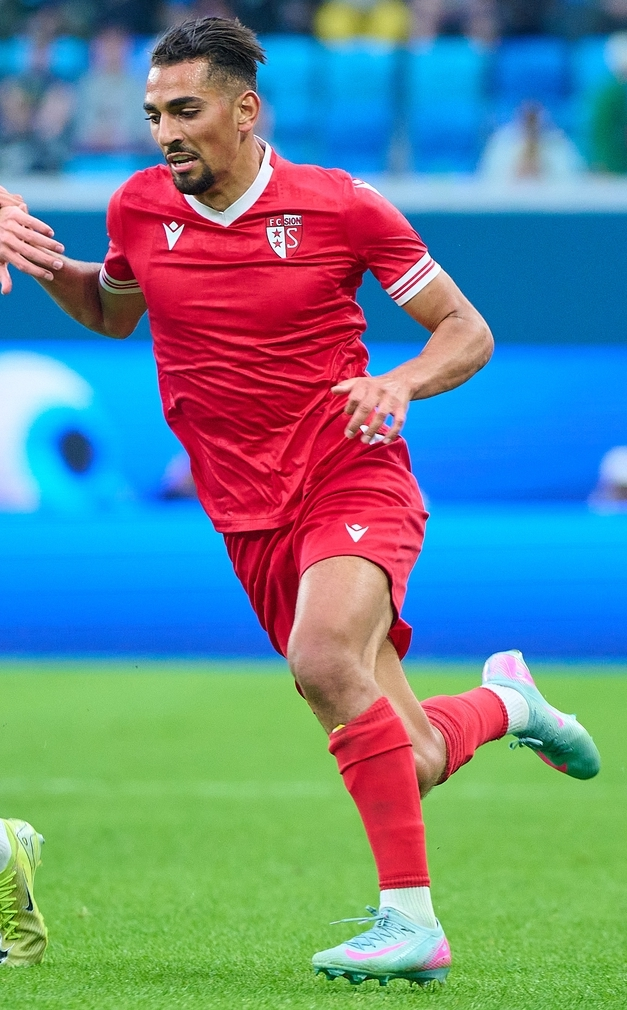
- Chouaref with Sion in 2025

Personal information
- Date of birth: 12 December 2000 (age 25)
- Place of birth: Châteauroux, France
- Height: 1.77 m (5 ft 10 in)
- Position: Winger

Team information
- Current team: Sion
- Number: 7

Youth career
- 2006–2018: Châteauroux

Senior career*
Years	Team	Apps	(Gls)
2017–2022	Châteauroux II	28	(9)
2018–2022	Châteauroux	73	(4)
2022–	Sion	154	(25)

International career^{‡}
2019	France U19	1	(0)
2025–	Malta	17	(0)
- * Club domestic league appearances and goals as of 21:20, 21 November 2026 (UTC) ‡ National team caps and goals as of 21:26, 16 November 2026 (UTC)

Ilyas Chouaref (born 12 December 2000) is a professional footballer who plays as a winger for Swiss Super League club Sion. Born in France, he plays for the Malta national team.

== Club career ==
Chouaref is a youth product of LB Châteauroux. He made his debut with them in a 2–1 Ligue 2 loss to Le Havre AC on 4 December 2018. On 1 October 2019, he signed a professional contract with the club.

On 12 June 2022, Chouaref transferred to Sion in Switzerland.

== International career ==
Born in France, Chouaref is of Moroccan and Maltese descent. He was a youth international for France. On 18 February 2025, Bjorn Vassallo, president of the Malta FA confirmed that Chouaref had obtained Maltese citizenship.

On 21 March 2025, Chouaref made his debut for Malta against Finland in a World Cup qualifying match, starting and playing the full 90 minutes in a 0–1 loss.

== Career statistics ==
=== Club ===
As of match played 7 November 2026

Appearances and goals by club, season and competition
Club	Season	League			National Cup (Note: includes Coupe de France and Swiss Cup)		Europe		Other		Total	
Club	Season	Division	Apps	Goals	Apps	Goals	Apps	Goals	Apps	Goals	Apps	Goals
LB Châteauroux	2018–19	Ligue 2	11	1	1	0	–		–		12	1
LB Châteauroux	2019–20	Ligue 2	22	2	1	0	–		–		23	2
LB Châteauroux	2020–21	Ligue 2	34	1	1	0	–		–		35	1
LB Châteauroux	2021–22	National	6	0	0	0	–		–		6	0
LB Châteauroux	Total		73	4	3	0	—		—		76	4
FC Sion	2022–23	Super League	32	1	4	1	–		2 (Note: appearances in Swiss Super League Relegation play-off)	0	38	2
FC Sion	2023–24	Challenge League	35	6	4	1	–		–		39	7
FC Sion	2024–25	Super League	37	6	3	0	–		–		40	6
FC Sion	2025–26	Super League	38	9	4	1	–		–		42	10
FC Sion	2026–27	Super League	11	3	1	0	6 (Note: appearances and goals in 2026–27 UEFA Conference League)	2	–		18	5
FC Sion	Total		153	25	16	3	6	2	2	0	177	30
Total			223	29	19	3	6	2	2	0	250	34

=== International ===
As of match played 16 November 2026

Appearances and goals by national team and year
National team	Year	Apps	Goals
Malta	2025	8	0
Malta	2026	9	0
Total		17	0

== Personal life ==
His elder brother Hamza Sakhi is also a footballer.
