= Heinz Lindner =

Austrian footballer

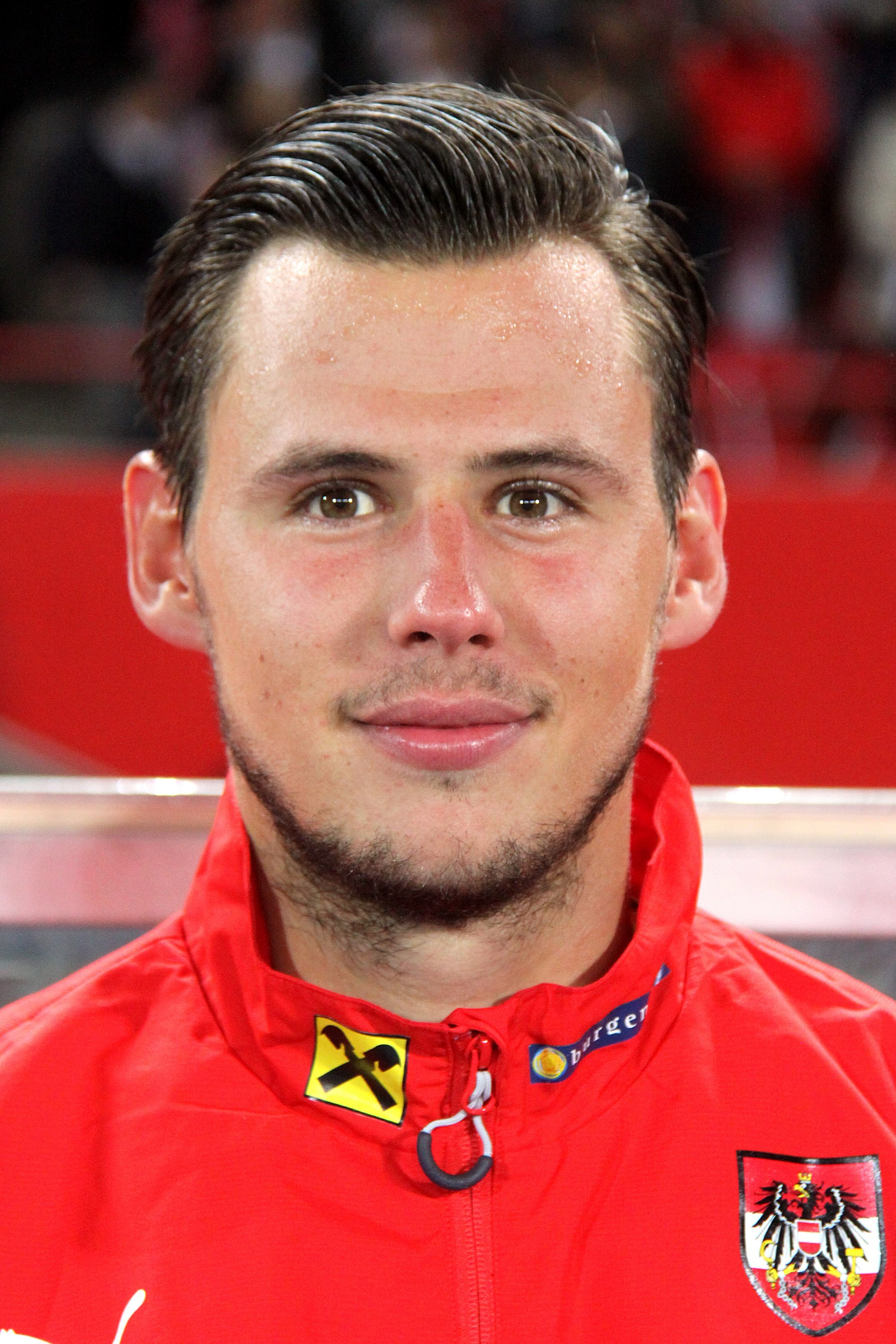
- Lindner with Austria in 2015

Personal information
- Date of birth: 17 July 1990 (age 36)
- Place of birth: Linz, Austria
- Height: 1.87 m (6 ft 2 in)
- Position: Goalkeeper

Team information
- Current team: Zürich
- Number: 13

Senior career*
Years	Team	Apps	(Gls)
2007–2011	Austria Wien II	26	(0)
2010–2015	Austria Wien	166	(0)
2015–2017	Eintracht Frankfurt	2	(0)
2017–2019	Grasshoppers	71	(0)
2019–2020	Wehen Wiesbaden	23	(0)
2020–2022	Basel	67	(0)
2022–2025	Sion	30	(0)
2024	→ Union Saint-Gilloise (loan)	1	(0)
2025–2026	Young Boys	0	(0)
2026–	Zürich	3	(0)

International career^{‡}
2012–2024	Austria	37	(0)
- * Club domestic league appearances and goals as of 9 August 2026 ‡ National team caps and goals as of 19:53, 8 June 2024 (UTC)

Heinz Lindner (German pronunciation: [haɪnts ˈlɪndnɐ]; born 17 July 1990) is an Austrian professional footballer who plays as a goalkeeper for Swiss Super League club Zürich.

== Club career ==
Lindner started his career with the reserve team for Austria Wien where he made 32 appearances. He then went on to make 187 first team appearances. In January 2015, Lindner was about to transfer to La Liga club Córdoba, but the move fell through. Lindner instead agreed a transfer with German club Eintracht Frankfurt. He played in Frankfurt for two seasons. For two seasons he played in the Swiss Super League for Grasshopper Club, but following their relegation he moved on to Wehen Wiesbaden.

On 8 September 2020, FC Basel announced that they had signed Lindner on a three-year contract. Lindner joined Basel's first team for their 2020–21 season under head coach Ciriaco Sforza. Originally signed as backup goalkeeper, Lindner played his domestic league debut for the club in the home game in the Stadion Wankdorf on 21 November as Basel were defeated 1–2 by Young Boys. Lindner then established himself as first choice goalkeeper. He stayed with the club for two seasons and then moved on. During his period with the club Lindner played a total of 90 games for Basel. 67 of these games were in the Swiss Super League, 14 in the UEFA Europa Conference League and 9 were friendly games.

Lindner signed with Sion on 26 June 2022. and on 16 May 2023, he announced his testicular cancer diagnosis. He returned to training a month later, however he did not return to the FC Sion squad, as the club did not request a license for him.

On 16 January 2024, he joined Belgian Pro League club Saint-Gilloise for a half-season long loan.

== International career ==
Lindner made his debut for the senior national team on 1 June 2012, in a 3–2 win over Ukraine in a friendly match.

He represented the national team at 2016 UEFA Euro.

== Career statistics ==
=== Club ===
As of match played on 17 August 2025

Appearances and goals by club, season and competition
Club	Season	League			Cup		Continental		Other		Total	
Club	Season	Division	Apps	Goals	Apps	Goals	Apps	Goals	Apps	Goals	Apps	Goals
Austria Wien (A)	2007–08	First League	1	0	—		—		—		1	0
Austria Wien (A)	2008–09	First League	10	0	4	0	—		—		14	0
Austria Wien (A)	2009–10	First League	13	0	2	0	—		—		15	0
Austria Wien (A)	2010–11	Regional League East	2	0	—		—		—		2	0
Austria Wien (A)	Total		26	0	6	0	—		—		32	0
Austria Wien	2009–10	Austrian Bundesliga	16	0	1	0	0	0	—		17	0
Austria Wien	2010–11	Austrian Bundesliga	24	0	0	0	6 (Note: Appearances in the UEFA Europa League)	0	—		30	0
Austria Wien	2011–12	Austrian Bundesliga	23	0	5	0	3	0	—		31	0
Austria Wien	2012–13	Austrian Bundesliga	36	0	4	0	—		—		40	0
Austria Wien	2013–14	Austrian Bundesliga	36	0	1	0	10 (Note: Appearances in the UEFA Champions League)	0	—		47	0
Austria Wien	2014–15	Austrian Bundesliga	31	0	6	0	—		—		37	0
Austria Wien	Total		166	0	17	0	19	0	—		202	0
Eintracht Frankfurt	2015–16	Bundesliga	0	0	1	0	—		0	0	1	0
Eintracht Frankfurt	2016–17	Bundesliga	2	0	0	0	—		—		2	0
Eintracht Frankfurt	Total		2	0	1	0	—		0	0	3	0
Grasshoppers	2017–18	Swiss Super League	36	0	4	0	—		—		40	0
Grasshoppers	2018–19	Swiss Super League	35	0	0	0	—		—		35	0
Grasshoppers	Total		71	0	4	0	—		—		75	0
Wehen Wiesbaden	2019–20	2. Bundesliga	23	0	0	0	—		—		23	0
Basel	2020–21	Swiss Super League	31	0	0	0	0	0	—		31	0
Basel	2021–22	Swiss Super League	36	0	0	0	14 (Note: Appearances in UEFA Europa Conference League)	0	—		47	0
Basel	Total		67	0	0	0	14	0	—		78	0
Sion	2022–23	Swiss Super League	28	0	1	0	—		—		29	0
Sion	2023–24	Swiss Challenge League	0	0	0	0	—		—		0	0
Sion	2024–25	Swiss Super League	2	0	2	0	—		—		4	0
Sion	Total		30	0	1	0	—		—		31	0
Sion II	2023–24	Swiss 1. Liga	2	0	—		—		—		2	0
Saint-Gilloise (loan)	2023–24	Belgian Pro League	1	0	0	0	1	0	0	0	2	0
Young Boys	2025–26	Swiss Super League	0	0	1	0	0	0	—		1	0
Career total			388	0	28	0	34	0	0	0	453	0

=== International ===
As of matches played on 8 June 2024

Appearances and goals by national team and year
National team	Year	Apps	Goals
Austria	2012	2	0
Austria	2013	3	0
Austria	2014	2	0
Austria	2015	0	0
Austria	2016	1	0
Austria	2017	8	0
Austria	2018	8	0
Austria	2019	4	0
Austria	2020	0	0
Austria	2021	1	0
Austria	2022	5	0
Austria	2023	2	0
Austria	2024	1	0
Total		37	0

== Honours ==
Individual

- Swiss Super League Most clean sheets: 2021–22
