= Musa Araz =

Swiss footballer (born 1994)

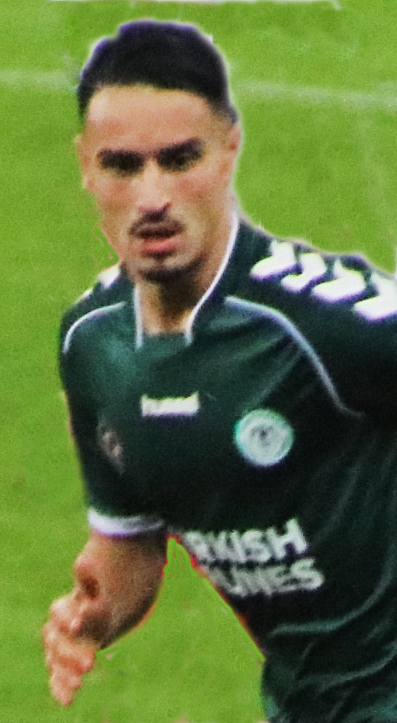

Personal information
- Date of birth: 17 January 1994 (age 32)
- Place of birth: Fribourg, Switzerland
- Height: 1.73 m (5 ft 8 in)
- Position: Attacking midfielder

Team information
- Current team: FC Corminboeuf

Youth career
- –2009: Fribourg
- 2009–2014: Basel

Senior career*
Years	Team	Apps	(Gls)
2014–2016	Basel	0	(0)
2014–2015	→ Le Mont (loan)	26	(1)
2015–2016	→ Winterthur (loan)	20	(0)
2016–2017	Lausanne-Sport	23	(1)
2017–2020	Konyaspor	16	(2)
2019	→ Afjet Afyonspor (loan)	7	(0)
2019	→ Bursaspor (loan)	3	(0)
2020	Xamax	17	(1)
2020–2023	Sion	66	(3)
2023–2025	Winterthur	17	(0)
2025	Xamax	6	(0)
2025–2026	FC Brugg		
2026–	FC Corminboeuf		

International career
2010	Switzerland U17	5	(0)
2014	Switzerland U19	5	(0)
2014–2016	Switzerland U21	6	(1)
- * Club domestic league appearances and goals as of 15 June 2025

Musa Araz (born 17 January 1994) is a Swiss footballer who plays for amateur club FC Corminboeuf.

== Club career ==
On 17 July 2023, Araz returned to Winterthur on a two-season contract.

== International career ==
Araz is of Turkish descent. He is a youth international for Switzerland.

== Honours ==
Konyaspor

- Turkish Super Cup: 2017
