= Gregory Karlen =

Swiss footballer (born 1995)

Personal information
- Date of birth: 30 January 1995 (age 31)
- Place of birth: Sion, Switzerland
- Height: 1.87 m (6 ft 2 in)
- Position: Midfielder

Youth career
- Sion

Senior career*
Years	Team	Apps	(Gls)
2013–2017	Sion II	48	(10)
2015–2018	Sion	39	(4)
2018–2022	Thun	126	(11)
2019	Thun II	2	(0)
2022–2025	St. Gallen	35	(3)
2024–2025	St. Gallen II	2	(1)

International career
2010	Switzerland U15	3	(0)
2011	Switzerland U16	2	(0)
2011–2012	Switzerland U17	9	(0)
2012–2013	Switzerland U18	8	(2)
2014	Switzerland U19	4	(3)
2015–2016	Switzerland U20	4	(1)
- * Club domestic league appearances and goals

Gregory Karlen (born 30 January 1995) is a Swiss former professional footballer who played as a midfielder.

== Personal life ==
Gregory's brother Gaëtan is also a professional footballer.
