= Cleilton Itaitinga =

Brazilian footballer (born 1998)

Cleiton Itaitinga
Personal information
- Full name: Cleilton Monteiro da Costa
- Date of birth: 14 October 1998 (age 28)
- Place of birth: Itaitinga, Brazil
- Height: 1.84 m (6 ft 0 in)
- Position: Forward

Team information
- Current team: Étoile Carouge
- Number: 76

Youth career
- 2017: Palmeiras
- 2017: Vitória
- 2018: Fortaleza

Senior career*
Years	Team	Apps	(Gls)
2016–2017	Tiradentes	12	(3)
2018–2019	Sion II	17	(5)
2018–2024	Sion	95	(14)
2021	→ Pau (loan)	18	(3)
2025	Sion II	1	(0)
2025–	Étoile Carouge	37	(15)
- * Club domestic league appearances and goals as of 30 September 2026

Cleilton Monteiro da Costa (born 14 October 1998), commonly known as Cleilton Itaitinga or simply Itaitinga, is a Brazilian professional footballer who plays as a forward for Étoile Carouge.

== Career statistics ==
=== Club ===
As of 18 August 2020.

Appearances and goals by club, season and competition
Club	Season	League			State League		Cup		Other		Total	
Club	Season	Division	Apps	Goals	Apps	Goals	Apps	Goals	Apps	Goals	Apps	Goals
Tiradentes	2016	–			2 (Note: Appearances in the Campeonato Cearense)	0	0	0	0	0	2	0
Tiradentes	2017	–			9	3	0	0	0	0	9	3
Tiradentes	Total		0	0	12	3	0	0	0	0	0	0
FC Sion U21	2018–19	Swiss Promotion League	14	2	–		–		0	0	14	2
FC Sion U21	2019–20	Swiss Promotion League	3	3	–		–		0	0	3	3
FC Sion U21	Total		17	5	0	0	0	0	0	0	17	5
FC Sion	2018–19	Swiss Super League	9	4	–		1 (Note: Appearances in the Swiss Cup)	0	0	0	10	4
FC Sion	2019–20	Swiss Super League	25	3	–		2	0	0	0	27	3
FC Sion	2020–21	Swiss Super League	0	0	–		0	0	0	0	0	0
FC Sion	Total		34	7	0	0	3	0	0	0	37	7
Career total			51	12	12	3	3	0	0	0	66	15
