= Yanick Brecher =

Swiss footballer (born 1993)

Personal information
- Date of birth: 25 May 1993 (age 33)
- Place of birth: Zürich, Switzerland
- Height: 1.96 m (6 ft 5 in)
- Position: Goalkeeper

Youth career
- 2006–2014: FC Zürich

Senior career*
Years	Team	Apps	(Gls)
2012–2026	FC Zürich	323	(0)
2014–2015	→ FC Wil (loan)	25	(0)

International career
2011–2012	Switzerland U19	6	(0)
2013–2014	Switzerland U21	3	(0)
- * Club domestic league appearances and goals

Yanick Brecher (born 25 May 1993) is a Swiss former professional footballer who played as a goalkeeper.

== Club career ==
=== Early career ===
In his youth, Brecher played for FC Männedorf before joining Zürich. He came up through the Zürich youth system, playing for the under-18s and under-23s before entering the first team.

=== FC Zürich ===
Brecher signed for the senior team in the summer of 2011. He made his league debut for the club on 1 June 2013 in a 4–2 away defeat to FC Sion. He played all ninety minutes of the match. In the summer of 2019, Brecher was named captain of FC Zürich. On 8 July 2022, Zürich announced that Brecher had signed a contract extension to keep him at the club through the summer of 2027.

He made his 300th Swiss Super League appearance for Zürich in August 2025.

=== FC Wil (loan) ===
In July 2014, Brecher was loaned out to Challenge League club FC Wil. He made his league debut for the club on 21 July 2014 in a 4–0 away loss to Winterthur. He played all ninety minutes of the match.

== Career statistics ==
As of match played 22 May 2025

Appearances and goals by club, season and competition
Club	Season	League			Cup		Europe		Other		Total	
Club	Season	Division	Apps	Goals	Apps	Goals	Apps	Goals	Apps	Goals	Apps	Goals
FC Zürich	2011–12	Swiss Super League	0	0	0	0	0	0	—		0	0
FC Zürich	2012–13	Swiss Super League	1	0	0	0	—		—		1	0
FC Zürich	2013–14	Swiss Super League	2	0	0	0	0	0	—		2	0
FC Zürich	2014–15	Swiss Super League	11	0	1	0	—		—		12	0
FC Zürich	2015–16	Swiss Super League	22	0	1	0	2	0	—		25	0
FC Zürich	2017–18	Swiss Challenge League	2	0	0	0	0	0	—		2	0
FC Zürich	2017–18	Swiss Super League	14	0	6	0	—		—		20	0
FC Zürich	2018–19	Swiss Super League	35	0	0	0	7	0	—		42	0
FC Zürich	2019–20	Swiss Super League	33	0	2	0	—		—		35	0
FC Zürich	2020–21	Swiss Super League	36	0	1	0	—		—		37	0
FC Zürich	2021–22	Swiss Super League	34	0	0	0	—		—		34	0
FC Zürich	2022–23	Swiss Super League	34	0	1	0	12	0	—		47	0
FC Zürich	2023–24	Swiss Super League	38	0	2	0	—		—		40	0
FC Zürich	2024–25	Swiss Super League	38	0	3	0	4	0	—		44	0
FC Zürich	Total		300	0	17	0	25	0	—		342	0
FC Wil (loan)	2014–15	Swiss Challenge League	25	0	0	0	—		—		25	0
Career total			325	0	17	0	25	0	0	0	367	0

== Honors ==
FC Zürich

- Swiss Super League: 2021-22
- Challenge League: 2016–17
- Swiss Cup: 2013–14, 2015–16, 2017–18
