= Siyar Doldur =

Swiss footballer (born 2000)

Personal information
- Date of birth: 29 January 2000 (age 26)
- Place of birth: Bellinzona, Switzerland
- Height: 1.71 m (5 ft 7 in)
- Position: Midfielder

Team information
- Current team: Sion U21
- Number: 15

Youth career
- 2017–2018: Sion

Senior career*
Years	Team	Apps	(Gls)
2018–	Sion U21	11	(0)
2018–	Sion	8	(0)
2018–2019	→ Bellinzona (loan)	23	(0)
2019–2020	→ Chiasso (loan)	13	(0)
2022–2023	→ Bellinzona (loan)	9	(0)

International career^{‡}
2014	Switzerland U15	1	(2)
2017	Switzerland U18	1	(0)
- * Club domestic league appearances and goals as of 10 September 2023 ‡ National team caps and goals as of 5 October 2017

Siyar Doldur (Turkish: Şiyar Doldur; born 29 January 2000) is a Swiss professional footballer who plays as a midfielder for Sion.

== Career ==
Doldur joined FC Sion in 2017, and his began his senior career with successive loans to Bellinzona and Chiasso. He made his professional debut with Sion in a 4–2 Swiss Super League loss to FC Basel 1893 on 9 December 2020.

On 27 August 2022, Doldur returned to Bellinzona on a new loan.

== Personal life ==
Born in Switzerland, Doldur is of Turkish descent.
