= Gaëtan Karlen =

Swiss footballer (born 1993)

Personal information
- Date of birth: 7 June 1993 (age 33)
- Place of birth: Sion, Switzerland
- Height: 1.86 m (6 ft 1 in)
- Position: Forward

Youth career
- Conthey
- Sion

Senior career*
Years	Team	Apps	(Gls)
2013–2015	Sion	17	(1)
2014	→ Biel-Bienne (loan)	17	(9)
2015	Thun	16	(2)
2015–2016	Biel-Bienne	17	(4)
2016–2020	Neuchâtel Xamax	77	(28)
2020–2023	Sion	72	(11)

International career
2010	Switzerland U18	4	(1)
2011	Switzerland U19	4	(1)
2013	Switzerland U20	8	(2)
2014	Switzerland U21	1	(0)
- * Club domestic league appearances and goals as of 5 June 2023

Gaëtan Karlen (born 7 June 1993) is a Swiss professional footballer who plays as a forward.

== Personal life ==
Gaëtan's brother Gregory is also a professional footballer. They have both played for Sion and Thun.
