= 2020–21 Swiss Super League =

124th season of top-tier Swiss football

Swiss Super League
- Season: 2020–21
- Dates: 19 September 2020 – 21 May 2021
- Champions: Young Boys; 15th title
- Champions League: Young Boys
- Europa Conference League: Basel; Servette; Luzern; Vaduz
- Matches: 180
- Goals: 515 (2.86 per match)
- Top goalscorer: Jean-Pierre Nsame (19 goals)
- Longest winning run: 6 matches Young Boys
- Longest unbeaten run: 21 matches Young Boys
- Longest winless run: 8 matches St. Gallen; Vaduz
- Longest losing run: 5 matches Vaduz

The 2020–21 Swiss Super League (referred to as the Raiffeisen Super League for sponsoring reasons) was the 124th season of top-tier competitive football in Switzerland and the 18th under its current name and format.

A total of ten teams competed in the league: the eight best teams from the 2019–20 season, the 2019–20 Swiss Challenge League champions Lausanne-Sport and relegation play-off winners Vaduz. Young Boys were the three-time defending champions, and successfully defended their title.

== Teams ==
=== Stadia and locations ===
Location of the 2020–21 Swiss Super League teams

Club	Location	Stadium	Capacity
Basel	Basel	St. Jakob-Park	37,994
Lausanne-Sport	Lausanne	Stade de la Tuilière (as of 29 November); Stade Olympique de la Pontaise	12,544; 12,500
Lugano	Lugano	Stadio Cornaredo	6,390
Luzern	Lucerne	Swissporarena	16,490
Servette	Geneva	Stade de Genève	30,084
Sion	Sion	Stade Tourbillon	14,283
St. Gallen	St. Gallen	Kybunpark	19,456
Vaduz	(Liechtenstein) Vaduz	Rheinpark Stadion	7,584
Young Boys	Bern	Stade de Suisse	31,789
Zürich	Zürich	Letzigrund	26,104

=== Personnel and kits ===
Team	Manager	Captain	Kit manufacturer	Shirt sponsor
Basel	(Switzerland) Patrick Rahmen (interim)	(Switzerland) Valentin Stocker	Adidas	Novartis
Lausanne-Sport	(Switzerland) Giorgio Contini	(Croatia) Stjepan Kukuruzović	Le Coq Sportif	BCV
Lugano	(Switzerland) Maurizio Jacobacci	(Uruguay) Jonathan Sabbatini	Acerbis	AIL; Casinò Lugano
Luzern	(Switzerland) Fabio Celestini	(Switzerland) Christian Schwegler	Craft	Otto’s
Servette	(Switzerland) Alain Geiger	(Switzerland) Anthony Sauthier	Puma	La Praille; M3 Groupe
Sion	(Switzerland) Marco Walker	(Ivory Coast) Serey Dié	Macron	Capital Markets Consulting
St. Gallen	(Germany) Peter Zeidler	(Switzerland) Silvan Hefti	Jako	St.Galler Kantonalbank
Vaduz	(Liechtenstein) Mario Frick	(Liechtenstein) Benjamin Büchel	Puma	National Bank of Liechtenstein; MBPI
Young Boys	(Switzerland) Gerardo Seoane	(Switzerland) Fabian Lustenberger	Nike	Plus500
Zürich	(Switzerland) Massimo Rizzo	(Switzerland) Yanick Brecher	Nike	AntePay

=== Managerial changes ===
Team	Outgoing manager	Manner of departure	Date of departure	Position in table	Incoming manager	Date of appointment
Sion	(Italy) Paolo Tramezzani	End of contract	7 August 2020	Pre-season	(Italy) Fabio Grosso	25 August 2020
Basel	(Switzerland) Marcel Koller	End of contract	31 August 2020	Pre-season	(Switzerland) Ciriaco Sforza	1 September 2020
Zürich	(Switzerland) Ludovic Magnin	Sacked	5 October 2020	10th	(Switzerland) Massimo Rizzo	5 October 2020
Sion	(Italy) Fabio Grosso	Sacked	5 March 2021	10th	(Switzerland) Christian Constantin (interim)	5 March 2021
Sion	(Switzerland) Christian Constantin (interim)	End of interim	11 March 2021	9th	(France) Ugo Raczynski (interim)	11 March 2021
Sion	(France) Ugo Raczynski (interim)	End of interim	16 March 2021	9th	(Switzerland) Marco Walker	16 March 2021
Basel	(Switzerland) Ciriaco Sforza	Sacked	6 April 2021	5th	(Switzerland) Patrick Rahmen (interim)	6 April 2021

== League table ==
Pos	Team	Pld	W	D	L	GF	GA	GD	Pts	Qualification or relegation
1	Young Boys (C)	36	25	9	2	74	29	+45	84	Qualification for the Champions League second qualifying round
2	Basel	36	15	8	13	60	53	+7	53	Qualification for the Europa Conference League second qualifying round
3	Servette	36	14	8	14	45	56	−11	50	Qualification for the Europa Conference League second qualifying round
4	Lugano	36	12	13	11	40	42	−2	49	
5	Luzern	36	12	10	14	62	59	+3	46	Qualification for the Europa Conference League third qualifying round (Note: Luzern qualified for the Europa Conference League third qualifying round as winners of the 2020–21 Swiss Cup.)
6	Lausanne-Sport	36	12	10	14	52	55	−3	46	
7	St. Gallen	36	11	11	14	45	48	−3	44	
8	Zürich	36	11	10	15	53	57	−4	43	
9	Sion (O)	36	8	14	14	48	58	−10	38	Qualification for the relegation play-offs
10	Vaduz (R)	36	9	9	18	36	58	−22	36	Qualification for the Europa Conference League second qualifying round and relegation to Challenge League (Note: Vaduz qualified for the Europa Conference League second qualifying round by being declared winners of the 2020–21 Liechtenstein Cup.)

Source: Swiss Super League
Rules for classification: 1) Points; 2) Goal difference; 3) Goals scored; 4) Head-to-head goal difference; 5) Away goals scored; 6) Draw.
(C) Champions; (O) Play-off winners; (R) Relegated

== Results ==
=== First and second round ===
Home \ Away	BAS	LAU	LUG	LUZ	SER	SIO	StG	VAD	YB	ZÜR
Basel	—	2–1	2–2	3–2	1–0	4–2	0–0	2–2	0–2	1–4
Lausanne-Sport	1–3	—	0–1	2–1	2–1	0–1	0–1	3–0	0–3	4–0
Lugano	1–0	0–0	—	2–1	1–1	2–2	1–0	1–1	0–2	0–1
Luzern	1–2	2–2	1–1	—	3–0	2–0	2–2	1–1	2–3	0–0
Servette	1–0	1–1	1–1	1–3	—	1–1	2–2	1–1	0–0	2–1
Sion	2–3	0–0	1–1	1–2	2–0	—	3–2	2–1	0–0	2–2
St. Gallen	1–3	2–2	0–0	2–1	1–0	1–0	—	2–0	1–2	2–3
Vaduz	0–2	0–2	1–1	1–1	0–2	4–1	0–1	—	0–0	1–4
Young Boys	2–1	1–0	2–2	2–1	1–2	2–1	0–0	1–0	—	2–1
Zürich	1–0	4–0	2–2	2–0	0–1	0–0	1–2	0–1	1–4	—

Source: Soccerway
Legend: Blue = home team win; Yellow = draw; Red = away team win.

=== Third and fourth round ===
Home \ Away	BAS	LAU	LUG	LUZ	SER	SIO	StG	VAD	YB	ZÜR
Basel	—	0–0	2–0	4–1	5–0	2–2	1–0	1–2	1–1	4–0
Lausanne-Sport	3–3	—	2–0	2–1	3–1	1–3	4–3	2–1	2–4	2–2
Lugano	2–1	1–0	—	2–3	0–1	3–1	2–0	0–2	1–3	0–1
Luzern	3–4	1–0	1–2	—	3–0	1–1	4–2	4–0	2–2	3–1
Servette	2–1	1–4	1–1	4–2	—	3–5	1–2	1–2	2–1	3–1
Sion	4–0	1–1	0–3	1–1	1–2	—	1–1	0–2	0–3	2–2
St. Gallen	3–1	5–0	0–1	0–0	0–1	0–3	—	1–0	2–2	1–1
Vaduz	1–1	0–3	0–3	1–2	1–3	3–0	2–1	—	0–2	3–2
Young Boys	2–0	4–2	3–0	5–2	2–0	2–1	2–0	1–1	—	4–0
Zürich	2–0	1–1	3–0	1–2	1–2	1–1	2–2	4–1	1–2	—

Source: Swiss Super League
Legend: Blue = home team win; Yellow = draw; Red = away team win.

== Relegation play-offs ==
The ninth-placed team of the 2020–21 Swiss Super League, Sion, played against the runners-up of the 2020–21 Swiss Challenge League, Thun.

=== First leg ===
27 May 2021
20:30

Thun	1–4	Sion
Salanović 89'	Report	Hoarau 13', 63' (pen.); Tosetti 15'; Uldrikis 86'

Stockhorn Arena, Thun
Attendance: 100
Referee: Sandro Schärer

=== Second leg ===
30 May 2021
16:00

Sion	2–3	Thun
Tupta 30', 45+2'	Report	Dzonlagic 3'; Schmidt 38'; Havenaar 55'

Stade de Tourbillon, Sion
Attendance: 100
Referee: Fedayi San

Sion won 6–4 on aggregate.

== Top scorers ==
Rank	Player	Club	Goals
1	(Cameroon) Jean-Pierre Nsame	Young Boys	19
2	(Brazil) Arthur Cabral	Basel	18
3	(Switzerland) Antonio Marchesano	Zürich	11
3	(France) Grejohn Kyei	Servette	11
3	(United States) Jordan Pefok	Young Boys	11
3	(Switzerland) Dejan Sorgić	Luzern	11
7	(Switzerland) Pajtim Kasami	Basel	10
8	(Switzerland) Anto Grgić	Sion	9
8	(Switzerland) Kwadwo Duah	St. Gallen	9
8	(Netherlands) Alex Schalk	Servette	9

== Awards ==
Swiss Football League Awards 2020
Award	Winner	Club
Player of the Season	(Cameroon) Jean-Pierre Nsame	BSC Young Boys
Young Player of the Season	(Switzerland) Leonidas Stergiou	FC St. Gallen
Coach of the Season	(Switzerland) Gerardo Seoane	BSC Young Boys
Goal of the Season	(Cameroon) Nicolas Moumi Ngamaleu	BSC Young Boys

=== Annual awards ===
Player of the Season

Player of the Season awarded to (Brazil) Arthur Cabral (Basel)

Young Player of the Season

Young Player of the Season awarded to (Switzerland) Kastriot Imeri (Servette)

Coach of the Season

Coach of the Season awarded to (Switzerland) Gerardo Seoane (Young Boys)

Goal of the Season

Goal of the Season awarded to (Sweden) Alexander Gerndt (Lugano)

=== Team of the Year ===

Team of the Year was:

Team of the Year
Goalkeeper	(Switzerland) David von Ballmoos (Young Boys)			
Defenders	(Switzerland) Silvan Widmer (Basel)	(Switzerland) Fabian Lustenberger (Young Boys)	(Switzerland) Eray Cömert (Basel)	(Switzerland) Silvan Hefti (Young Boys)
Midfielders	(Switzerland) Benjamin Kololli (Zürich)	(Switzerland) Michel Aebischer (Young Boys)	(Spain) Jordi Quintillà (St. Gallen)	(Switzerland) Christian Fassnacht (Young Boys)
Forwards	(Brazil) Arthur Cabral (Basel)		(Cameroon) Jean-Pierre Nsame (Young Boys)	

== Clean sheets ==
As of matches played 21 February 2021

Rank	Player	Club	Clean sheets
1	(Switzerland) David von Ballmoos	Young Boys	9
2	(Ghana) Lawrence Ati-Zigi	St. Gallen	8
3	(Switzerland) Yanick Brecher	Zürich	7
4	(France) Mory Diaw	Lausanne	6
4	(Switzerland) Noam Baumann	Lugano	6
6	(Austria) Heinz Lindner	Basel	4
6	(Germany) Marius Müller	Luzern	4
6	(Switzerland) Jérémy Frick	Servette	4
9	(Switzerland) Kevin Fickentscher	Sion	3
10	(Democratic Republic of the Congo) Timothy Fayulu	Sion	2
10	(Liechtenstein) Benjamin Büchel	Vaduz	2
