= Yassin Fortuné =

Haitian footballer (born 1999)

Personal information
- Full name: Yassin Enzo Fortuné
- Date of birth: 30 January 1999 (age 27)
- Place of birth: Aubervilliers, France
- Height: 1.86 m (6 ft 1 in)
- Positions: Attacking midfielder; forward

Team information
- Current team: Vizela
- Number: 23

Youth career
- 2008: Stains FC
- 2008–2012: Red Star
- 2012–2015: RC Lens
- 2015–2018: Arsenal

Senior career*
Years	Team	Apps	(Gls)
2018–2024	Sion	53	(3)
2018–2024	Sion U21	10	(1)
2021	→ Angers (loan)	1	(0)
2021–2022	→ Cholet (loan)	18	(3)
2024	→ Polissya Zhytomyr (loan)	11	(0)
2024–2025	Quevilly-Rouen	28	(5)
2025–	Vizela	28	(3)

International career^{‡}
2014	France U16	11	(5)
2015	France U17	13	(2)
2016	France U18	15	(7)
2025–	Haiti	9	(1)
- * Club domestic league appearances and goals as of 15 September 2026 ‡ National team caps and goals as of 4 October 2026

Yassin Enzo Fortuné (born 30 January 1999) is a professional footballer who plays as an attacking midfielder for Liga Portugal 2 club Vizela. Born in France, he represents the Haiti national team.

== Early years ==
Fortuné was born in Aubervilliers, France to a Haitian father and Algerian mother. As a child growing up in the Paris area, Fortuné idolized Arsenal star and fellow countryman Thierry Henry, and has said he patterns his game after him, but compares himself to Danny Welbeck.

Fortuné started his career with Stains FC in the Ligue de Paris Île-de-France de football in January 2008. He left the club the same year and joined the third-tier Red Star in France in August. In July 2012, Fortuné signed with RC Lens

At age 16, Fortuné signed his first professional contract in July 2015 with Arsenal on a three-year £3 million deal, with two years as a scholar and one year on professional terms after facing competition from Manchester United.

Though with the club for three years, Fortuné only made 22 appearances for the Arsenal U18, U19 and U23 sides, scoring just two goals and three assists after being marred by injuries.

== Club career ==
=== FC Sion ===
In May 2018, after three years of not making a professional appearance for the senior Arsenal club, Fortuné had rejected a new three-year contract offer to stay with the club and agreed to four-year deal with FC Sion of the Swiss first division with Arsenal agreeing to transfer, becoming his first professional club.

It wasn’t until on 16 September 2018 when Fortuné made his professional debut for Sion against Lausanne-Sport. Six days later, on 22 September 2018, he made his league debut for the club, in a 4–1 loss against FC Thun. Fortuné scored his first goal during his first professional start on 30 September 2018 for Sion against Luzern. After making his debut for the club, he appeared in a number of matches. His second goal for the club then came on 11 November 2018, in a 2–1 win over FC Zürich.

==== Loan to Angers ====
In 31 January 2021, he was loaned to French Ligue 1 club Angers. He only made one substitute appearance for Angers during the loan.

==== Loan to Cholet ====
On 10 August 2021, he moved on a new French loan to Cholet, this time in the third-tier Championnat National.

==== Loan to Polissya ====
On 17 January 2024, Fortuné was loaned by Polissya Zhytomyr in Ukraine.

=== Vizela ===
On 4 August 2025, Fortuné signed a two-season contract with Vizela in Portuguese second tier.

== International career ==
Fortuné is eligible to play for France, Algeria and Haiti.

=== Youth career ===
Fortuné scored 5 goals for France U16 in 11 appearances, scoring against Ukraine U16 and Czech Republic U16.

Between September 2015 and May 2016, Fortuné then represented France U17, scoring 2 goals in 13 appearances, which were against Czech Republic U17 and Denmark U17. He also played three matches during the UEFA European Under-17 Championship tournament.

Fortuné then scored 7 goals in 15 appearances for France U18.

== Career statistics ==
=== Club ===
As of match played 15 September 2026

Appearances and goals by club, season and competition
Club	Season	League			National Cup (Note: Includes Swiss Cup, Coupe de France, Ukrainian Cup, Taça de Portugal)		Other		Total	
Club	Season	Division	Apps	Goals	Apps	Goals	Apps	Goals	Apps	Goals
Sion	2018–19	Swiss Super League	23	2	3	0	—		26	2
Sion	2019–20	Swiss Super League	11	0	1	0	—		12	0
Sion	2022–23	Swiss Super League	7	0	0	0	2 (Note: Appearances in Swiss Super League relegation play-offs)	0	9	0
Sion	2023–24	Swiss Super League	12	0	3	0	—		15	0
Sion	Total		53	0	7	0	2	0	62	2
Angers (loan)	2020–21	Ligue 1	1	0	0	0	—		1	0
Cholet (loan)	2021–22	Ligue 3	18	3	4	0	—		22	3
Polissya Zhytomyr (loan)	2023–24	Ukrainian Premier League	11	0	1	0	—		12	0
Quevilly-Rouen	2024–25	Ligue 3	28	0	5	0	—		33	0
Vizela	2025–26	Liga Portugal 2	23	3	1	0	—		24	3
Vizela	2026–27	Liga Portugal 2	5	0	1	0	—		6	0
Vizela	Total		28	3	2	0	—		30	3
Career total			138	8	19	0	2	0	159	8

=== International ===
As of match played 4 October 2026

Appearances and goals by national team and year
National team	Year	Apps	Goals
Haiti	2025	2	0
Haiti	2026	7	1
Total		9	1

Scores and results list Haiti's goal tally first, score column indicates score after each Fortuné goal.

List of international goals scored by Yassin Fortuné
No.	Date	Venue	Opponent	Score	Result	Competition
1	1 October 2026	Estadio Olímpico Félix Sánchez, Santo Domingo, Dominican Republic	Dominican Republic	4–1	4–1	2026–27 CONCACAF Nations League A
