= Gora Diouf =

Senegalese footballer (born 2002)

Personal information
- Date of birth: 20 September 2003 (age 23)
- Place of birth: Kasnack, Senegal
- Height: 1.85 m (6 ft 1 in)
- Position: Centre-back

Team information
- Current team: Mechelen
- Number: 4

Youth career
- Étoile Lusitana

Senior career*
Years	Team	Apps	(Gls)
2021–2022	Étoile Lusitana		
2022–2024	Sion II	8	(2)
2023–2025	Sion	36	(2)
2025–	Mechelen	18	(1)

International career^{‡}
2022	Senegal U20	2	(0)
- * Club domestic league appearances and goals as of 31 May 2026 ‡ National team caps and goals as of 15:26, 7 July 2025 (UTC)

Gora Diouf (born 20 September 2003) is a Senegalese professional football player who plays as a centre-back for Belgian Pro League club Mechelen.

== Career ==
A youth product of Étoile Lusitana, Diouf helped the club reach the final of the 2022 Senegal FA Cup. On 24 August 2022, Diouf transferred to the Swiss Super League club FC Sion on a contract until 2025, where he was originally assigned to their reserves. He made his senior and professional debut with Sion in a 2–1 Swiss Super League win over FC Luzern on 2 April 2023. On 30 June 2025, he transferred to the Belgian Pro League club Mechelen on a contract until 2028.

== International career ==
In May 2022, Diouf was called up to a training camp for the Senegal U20s.

== Playing style ==
Diouf is a left-footed defender who can play as a centre-back or left-back. He is lively, athletic and strong on tackles. He is also exceptionally fast, and can stifle opponents by not giving space.

== Honours ==
Sion

- 2023–24 Swiss Challenge League: 2023–24
