= Abdel Zagré =

Burkinabé footballer

Personal information
- Full name: Abdel Rachid Noufou Zagré
- Date of birth: 9 March 2004 (age 22)
- Place of birth: Bobo-Dioulasso, Burkina Faso
- Height: 1.87 m (6 ft 2 in)
- Position: Centre-forward

Team information
- Current team: Ravenna

Senior career*
Years	Team	Apps	(Gls)
2020–2021	Bobo Dioulasso	26	(5)
2021–2022	RC Kadiogo	29	(9)
2022–2024	Sion II	29	(14)
2022–2024	Sion	18	(0)
2024	Sakaryaspor	6	(0)
2025–	Ravenna	27	(2)
2026	→ Forlì (loan)	10	(0)

International career^{‡}
2021	Burkina Faso U20	2	(2)
2022	Burkina Faso	1	(0)
- * Club domestic league appearances and goals as of 30 April 2026 ‡ National team caps and goals as of 18 January 2026

Abdel Rachid Noufou Zagré (born 9 March 2004) is a Burkinabé professional footballer who plays for Italian Serie C Group B club Ravenna.

== Club career ==
Zagré was a product of the JS Konsa academy. He played his final season of domestic football at Rail Club du Kadiogo of the Burkinabé Premier League. In May 2022, it was announced that Zagré would join Swiss club FC Sion on a four-year contract in the summer transfer window. He reportedly also drew interest from Basel and Anderlecht.

== International career ==
Zagré captained the national under-20 side in 2023 Africa U-20 Cup of Nations qualification. He scored against Nigeria and Ghana in the Group Stage. He received his first senior call up for friendlies against Belgium and Kosovo in March 2022. He went on to make his senior debut in the match against Belgium on 29 March.

=== International career statistics ===
As of match played 29 March 2022

Burkina Faso national team
Year	Apps	Goals
2022	1	0
Total	1	0
