= Alexandros Safarikas =

Greek footballer

Personal information
- Date of birth: 26 August 1999 (age 27)
- Place of birth: Veria, Greece
- Height: 1.94 m (6 ft 4 1/2 in)
- Position: Goalkeeper

Youth career
- –2015: Nireas Veria
- 2015–2017: Veria

Senior career*
Years	Team	Apps	(Gls)
2017	Veria	1	(0)
2017–2018	AEL	0	(0)
2018–2021	Lecco	51	(0)
2020–2021	→ Chiasso (loan)	33	(0)
2021–2022	Chiasso	0	(0)
2021–2022	→ Sion (loan)	0	(0)
2021–2022	→ Sion II (loan)	19	(0)
2022–2024	Sion	7	(0)
2023–2024	Sion II	5	(0)
2024	Chania	4	(0)
2025	Panachaiki	0	(0)
2025–26	Marko	0	(0)
- * Club domestic league appearances and goals as of 30 July 2026

Alexandros Safarikas (Greek: Αλέξανδρος Σαφαρίκας; born 26 August 1999) is a Greek professional footballer who plays as a goalkeeper and is currently a free agent. He previously played for Super League 2 club Marko.

== Career ==
He began his career by playing for local team Nirea Verias. In 2015, Safarikas joined the youth system of Veria, the major team of the town. He was part of the academy for two years. On 30 April 2017, at the age of 17, he made his debut for the main team, playing in the Greek Super League, against Xanthi. On 8 June 2017, Safarikas left Veria and joined AEL. After being released from AEL for the 2018–19 season, he joined Italian team Lecco on 7 September 2018. On 6 October 2020, he was loaned to Swiss Challenge League club Chiasso on a two-year loan deal.

At the end of the 2020–21 season, with Chiasso bought Safarikas, but due to the team's relegation, he instantly was loaned to Swiss Super League club Sion for the 2021–22 season, with the option of purchasing him in summer 2022.

On 15 July 2024, Safarikas signed with Chania.
