= Kevin Halabaku =

Kosovan footballer (born 2001)

Personal information
- Date of birth: 29 November 2001 (age 24)
- Place of birth: Conthey, Switzerland
- Height: 1.81 m (5 ft 11 in)
- Position: Winger

Team information
- Current team: Hibernians
- Number: 18

Youth career
- 2014–2022: Sion

Senior career*
Years	Team	Apps	(Gls)
2019–2025	Sion II	63	(9)
2022–2025	Sion	27	(0)
2024	→ Schaffhausen (loan)	12	(0)
2025	Sulaibikhat SC		
2025–	Hibernians	17	(1)

International career^{‡}
2019	Kosovo U19	3	(0)
- * Club domestic league appearances and goals as of 18 May 2026 ‡ National team caps and goals as of 16:17, 27 February 2023 (UTC)

Kevin Halabaku (born 29 November 2001) is a professional footballer who plays as a winger for Maltese club Hibernians. Born in Switzerland, he is a youth international for Kosovo.

== Club career ==
Halabaku joined the youth academy of Sion at the age of 13. On 5 February 2021, he signed his first professional contract with the club until 2025. He made his senior and professional debut with Sion in a 2–0 Swiss Super League loss to Servette on 27 August 2022.

On 15 February 2024, Halabaku was loaned by Schaffhausen. He returned to Sion on 17 June 2024.

== International career ==
Born in Switzerland, Halabaku is of Kosovan descent. He played for the Kosovo U19s in 2019.
