= Denis-Will Poha =

French footballer (born 1997)

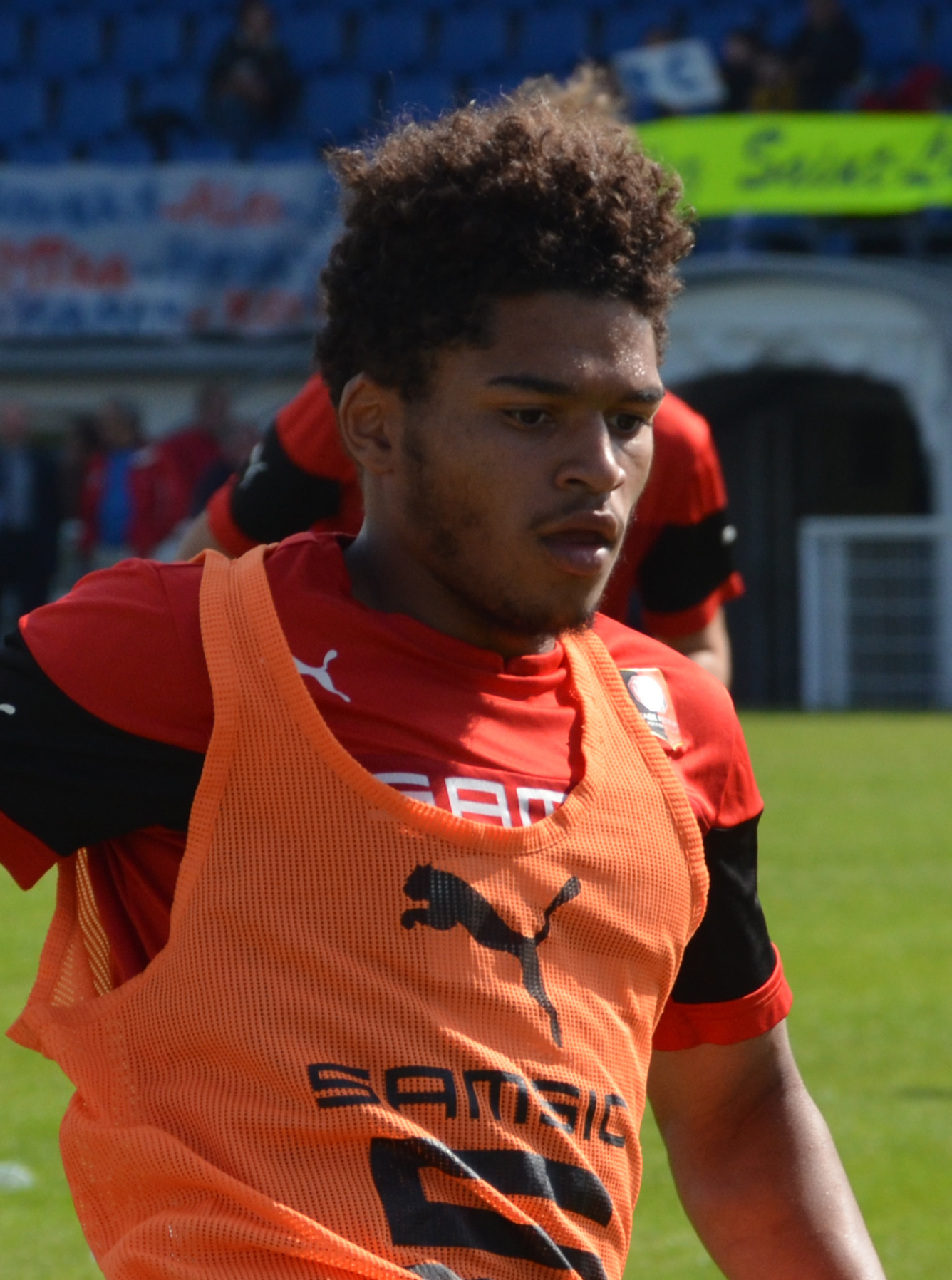
- Poha with Rennes II in 2015

Personal information
- Date of birth: 28 May 1997 (age 29)
- Place of birth: Lannion, France
- Height: 1.73 m (5 ft 8 in)
- Position: Midfielder

Team information
- Current team: Sion U21

Youth career
- 2004–2008: Lannion
- 2008–2010: Guingamp
- 2010–2011: Lannion
- 2011–2014: Rennes

Senior career*
| Years | Team | Apps | (Gls) |
| 2014–2018 | Rennes II | 63 | (5) |
| 2016–2020 | Rennes | 2 | (0) |
| 2017–2018 | → Orléans (loan) | 21 | (3) |
| 2019 | → Nancy (loan) | 14 | (1) |
| 2019–2020 | → Vitória de Guimarães (loan) | 20 | (0) |
| 2020–2022 | Vitória de Guimarães | 5 | (0) |
| 2021 | → Portimonense (loan) | 12 | (0) |
| 2022 | → Pau (loan) | 17 | (0) |
| 2022– | Sion | 39 | (2) |
| 2023– | Sion U21 | 13 | (1) |
| 2024 | → Quevilly-Rouen (loan) | 15 | (0) |

International career
| 2012–2013 | France U16 | 12 | (1) |
| 2013 | France U17 | 5 | (0) |
| 2015 | France U18 | 2 | (2) |
| 2015–2016 | France U19 | 19 | (0) |
| 2016–2017 | France U20 | 9 | (1) |
- * Club domestic league appearances and goals as of 16 November 2024

Denis-Will Poha (born 28 May 1997) is a French professional footballer who plays as midfielder for Swiss club Sion U21 in the fourth-tier 1. Liga.

== Club career ==
=== Early career ===
Born in Lannion in 1997, Poha started his football career with local team, Lannion FC, in October 2004. He played four seasons for Lannion and moved to Guingamp in July 2008, at the age of 11. After two years, Poha returned to hometown team, Lannion. After a season, he moved to Rennes.

=== Rennes ===
In 2015, Poha was called up for Stade Rennais first team. On 22 August, in a Ligue 1 match against Lyon, Poha was an unused substitute. On 14 December 2016, he made his senior team debut against in Coupe de la Ligue against Monaco at Stade Louis II, playing the game as a starter for full-time.

He was loaned to Nancy in January 2019 until the end of the season.

=== Vitória de Guimarães ===
In August 2019, Poha was loaned to Primeira Liga club Vitória de Guimarães.

In August 2020, Vitória de Guimarães exercised the purchase option on Poha, and he signed a three-year contract with the club.

On 1 February 2021, Poha moved to Primeira Liga club Portimonense, on a loan deal until the end of the season. On 14 January 2022, he signed for Ligue 2 club Pau on loan.

=== Sion ===
On 14 June 2022, Poha signed a three-year contract with Sion in Switzerland. On 29 January 2024, Poha moved on loan to Quevilly-Rouen until the end of the season.

== International career ==
Poha won the 2016 UEFA European Under-19 Championship with France U19 national team, playing five games in the competition.

== Career statistics ==
As of 1 July 2019

Appearances and goals by club, season and competition
| Club | Season | League | | | National cup | | League cup | | Europe | | Other | | Total | |
| Club | Season | Division | Apps | Goals | Apps | Goals | Apps | Goals | Apps | Goals | Apps | Goals | Apps | Goals |
|---|---|---|---|---|---|---|---|---|---|---|---|---|---|---|
| Rennes II | 2014–15 | CFA 2 | 13 | 0 | — | | — | | — | | — | | 13 | 0 |
| Rennes II | 2015–16 | CFA 2 | 22 | 1 | — | | — | | — | | — | | 22 | 1 |
| Rennes II | 2016–17 | CFA | 25 | 4 | — | | — | | — | | — | | 25 | 4 |
| Rennes II | 2018–19 | National 3 | 3 | 0 | — | | — | | — | | — | | 3 | 0 |
| Rennes II | Total | | 63 | 5 | — | | — | | — | | — | | 63 | 5 |
| Rennes | 2016–17 | Ligue 1 | 0 | 0 | 0 | 0 | 1 | 0 | — | | — | | 1 | 0 |
| Rennes | 2018–19 | Ligue 1 | 2 | 0 | 2 | 0 | 0 | 0 | 2 | 0 | — | | 6 | 0 |
| Rennes | Total | | 2 | 0 | 2 | 0 | 1 | 0 | 2 | 0 | — | | 7 | 0 |
| Orléans (loan) | 2017–18 | Ligue 2 | 35 | 4 | 1 | 0 | 1 | 0 | — | | — | | 37 | 4 |
| Nancy (loan) | 2018–19 | Ligue 2 | 14 | 1 | 0 | 0 | 0 | 0 | — | | — | | 14 | 1 |
| Vitória de Guimarães (loan) | 2019–20 | Primeira Liga | 20 | 0 | 0 | 0 | 3 | 0 | 8 | 0 | — | | 31 | 0 |
| Vitória de Guimarães | 2020–21 | Primeira Liga | 5 | 0 | 0 | 0 | 1 | 0 | — | | — | | 6 | 0 |
| Portimonense (loan) | 2020–21 | Primeira Liga | 12 | 0 | 0 | 0 | 0 | 0 | — | | — | | 12 | 0 |
| Pau (loan) | 2021–22 | Ligue 2 | 0 | 0 | 0 | 0 | — | | — | | — | | 0 | 0 |
| Career total | | | 151 | 10 | 3 | 0 | 6 | 0 | 10 | 0 | 0 | 0 | 170 | 10 |

== Honours ==
International

- UEFA European Under-19 Championship: 2016
