= Théo Bouchlarhem =

French footballer (born 2001)

Personal information
- Date of birth: 3 March 2001 (age 25)
- Place of birth: Saint-Jean-d'Angély, France
- Height: 1.80 m (5 ft 11 in)
- Position: Midfielder

Team information
- Current team: Lausanne Ouchy
- Number: 7

Youth career
- ES Saintes
- Chamois Niortais

Senior career*
Years	Team	Apps	(Gls)
2017–2021	Niort B	37	(4)
2021–2022	Lorient B	21	(6)
2022–2023	Pau B	23	(16)
2022–2023	Pau FC	3	(0)
2023–2026	Sion	79	(7)
2026	Étoile Carouge	14	(3)
2026–	Lausanne Ouchy	9	(2)
- * Club domestic league appearances and goals as of 20 September 2026

Théo Bouchlarhem (born 3 March 2001) is a French professional footballer who plays as a central midfielder for Swiss Challenge League club Lausanne Ouchy.

== Career ==
Bouchlarhem is a youth product of l’Aviron Boutonnais à Tonnay Boutonne puisES Saintes and Chamois Niortais. He began his senior career with their reserves in 2018. On 2021, Bouchlarhem joined the reserve team of Ligue 1 side FC Lorient. In June 2022, Bouchlarhem departed from Lorient after only one season for Pau FC. He made his professional debut with Pau in a 3–0 Ligue 2 loss to his former club Chamois Niortais on 30 December 2022.

On 9 July 2023, Bouchlarhem signed with Sion in Switzerland.

== Personal life ==
Born in France, Bouchlarhem is of Moroccan descent.
