= Nias Hefti =

Swiss footballer (born 1999)

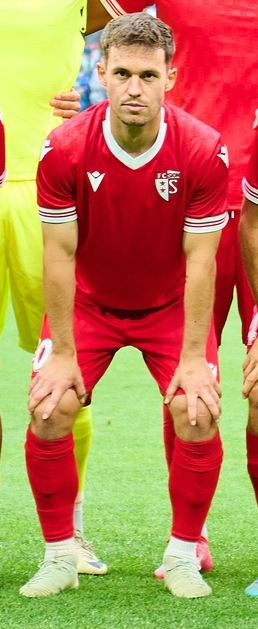

Personal information
- Date of birth: 18 December 1999 (age 26)
- Place of birth: Rorschach, Switzerland
- Height: 1.75 m (5 ft 9 in)
- Position: Left-back

Team information
- Current team: Sion
- Number: 20

Youth career
- 2008–2009: Goldach
- 2009–2018: St. Gallen

Senior career*
Years	Team	Apps	(Gls)
2016–2017	St. Gallen II	16	(0)
2018–2019	St. Gallen	0	(0)
2018–2019	→ Wil (loan)	44	(3)
2019–2023	Thun	99	(3)
2021–2022	Thun II	2	(0)
2022	→ Lausanne-Ouchy (loan)	14	(1)
2023–	Sion	99	(1)

International career^{‡}
2016–2017	Switzerland U18	7	(0)
2017–2018	Switzerland U19	7	(1)
2018–2019	Switzerland U20	6	(0)
2019	Switzerland U21	3	(0)
- * Club domestic league appearances and goals as of 28 September 2026 ‡ National team caps and goals as of 19 November 2019

Nias Hefti (born 18 December 1999) is a Swiss football player who plays for Sion as a left-back.

== Professional career ==
A youth product of St. Gallen, Hefti began his senior career on loan with FC Wil in the Swiss Challenge League, before transferring to FC Thun in 2019. Hefti made his professional debut with Thun in a 2-2 Swiss Super League tie with Neuchâtel Xamax on 20 July 2019.

On 14 January 2022, Hefti joined Lausanne-Ouchy on loan until the end of the season.

On 26 June 2023, Hefti signed with Sion.

== Personal life ==
Hefti is the brother of the footballer Silvan Hefti.
