= Théo Berdayes =

Swiss footballer (born 2002)

Personal information
- Full name: Théo Berdayes Marques
- Date of birth: 23 May 2002 (age 24)
- Place of birth: Saint-Maurice, Switzerland
- Height: 1.86 m (6 ft 1 in)
- Position: Forward

Team information
- Current team: Sion
- Number: 29

Youth career
- 2017–2021: Sion

Senior career*
Years	Team	Apps	(Gls)
2019–	Sion II	36	(10)
2021–	Sion	122	(11)
2022–2023	→ Yverdon (loan)	35	(6)

International career^{‡}
2022–	Switzerland U20	3	(1)
- * Club domestic league appearances and goals as of 28 September 2026 ‡ National team caps and goals as of 28 March 2023

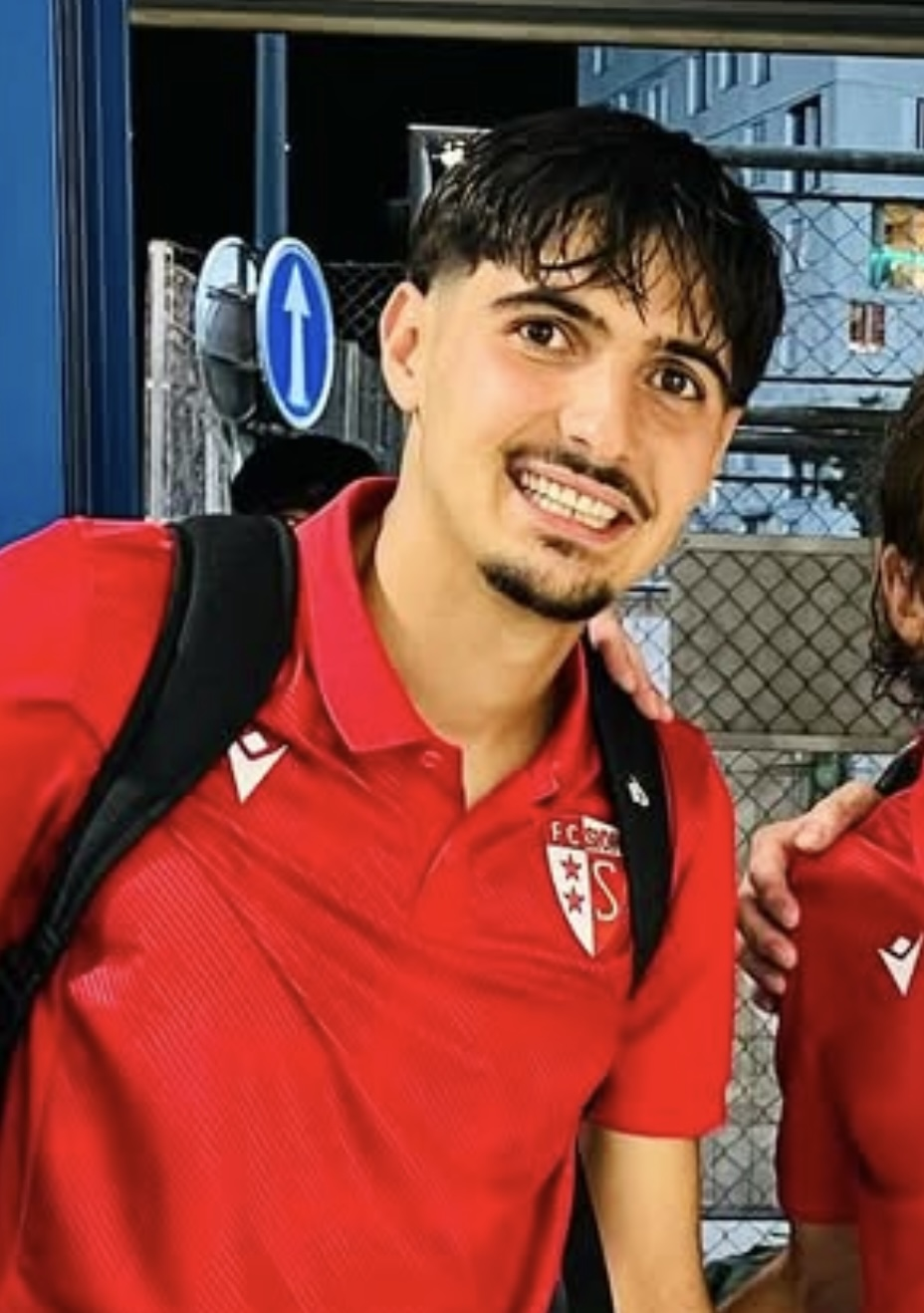
Théo Berdayes in August, 2023.

Théo Berdayes Marques (born 23 May 2002) is a Swiss professional footballer who plays as a forward for FC Sion.

== Career ==
On 26 January 2021, Berdayes signed his first professionally contract with FC Sion until 2025. He made his professional debut with Sion in a 1–0 Swiss Super League win over BSC Young Boys on 7 August 2021.

On 15 June 2022, Berdayes joined Yverdon on loan.

== Personal life ==
Born in Switzerland, Berdayes is of Spanish descent.
