= Edgar André (footballer) =

Angolan footballer (born 1999)

Personal information
- Full name: Edgar Antonio André
- Date of birth: 28 June 1999 (age 27)
- Place of birth: Sion, Switzerland
- Height: 1.84 m (6 ft 0 in)
- Position: Midfielder

Youth career
- 2009–2011: Châteauneuf
- 2013–2019: Sion

Senior career*
| Years | Team | Apps | (Gls) |
| 2017–2024 | Sion U21 | 68 | (3) |
| 2018 | → FC Conthey (loan) | 9 | (1) |
| 2019–2024 | Sion | 11 | (0) |
| 2021 | → Neuchâtel Xamax (loan) | 9 | (0) |
| 2021–2022 | → Bellinzona (loan) | 24 | (3) |
| 2024 | Arsenal Dzerzhinsk | 9 | (0) |

International career^{‡}
| 2020 | Angola | 1 | (0) |
- * Club domestic league appearances and goals as of 5 December 2024 ‡ National team caps and goals as of 13 October 2020

Edgar Antonio André (born 28 June 1999) is a professional footballer who plays as a midfielder. Born in Switzerland, he represents the Angola national team.

== Professional career ==
André made his professional debut with Sion in a 3–1 Swiss Super League loss to Luzern 20 October 2019.

On 30 August 2021, he joined Bellinzona on loan.

== International career ==
Born in Switzerland, André is of Angolan descent. André made his debut for the senior Angola national football team on 13 October 2020 as a 66th minute substitution during a friendly match against Mozambique.
