= Batata (footballer, born 2000) =

Brazilian footballer (born 2000)

Personal information
- Full name: Baltazar Costa Rodrigues de Oliveira
- Date of birth: 6 May 2000 (age 26)
- Place of birth: Jaraguá, Goiás, Brazil
- Height: 1.78 m (5 ft 10 in)
- Position: Midfielder

Team information
- Current team: Sion
- Number: 8

Youth career
- 2015–2018: Vila Nova

Senior career*
Years	Team	Apps	(Gls)
2018	Vila Nova	4	(0)
2018–	Sion	195	(9)
- * Club domestic league appearances and goals as of 28 September 2026

Baltazar Costa Rodrigues de Oliveira (born 6 May 2000), better known as Batata, is a Brazilian professional footballer who plays as a midfielder for Swiss Super League club Sion.

== Career ==
Batata began playing senior football with Vila Nova Futebol Clube in the Campeonato Goiano in 2018.

On 17 May 2017, Batata transferred to FC Sion in Switzerland. He made his professional debut for Sion in a 2–1 Swiss Super League loss to FC Lugano on 22 July 2018.

== Career statistics ==
=== Club ===
As of match played 13 September 2024

Appearances and goals by club, season and competition
Club	Season	League			National cup		Other		Total	
Club	Season	Division	Apps	Goals	Apps	Goals	Apps	Goals	Apps	Goals
Vila Nova	2018	Série B	0	0	0	0	4 (Note: Appearance(s) in Campeonato Goiano)	0	4	0
Sion	2018-19	Swiss Super League	9	0	2	0	—		11	0
Sion	2019-20	Swiss Super League	12	1	2	0	—		14	1
Sion	2020-21	Swiss Super League	21	3	2	0	2 (Note: Appearance(s) in Promotion/Relegation play-off)	0	25	3
Sion	2021-22	Swiss Super League	25	1	—		—		25	1
Sion	2022-23	Swiss Super League	26	0	2	0	2	0	30	0
Sion	2023-24	Swiss Challenge League	32	2	3	0	—		35	2
Sion	2024-25	Swiss Super League	6	0	1	0	—		7	0
Sion	Total		131	7	12	0	4	0	147	7
Career Total			131	7	12	0	8	0	151	7

== Personal life ==
Batata's real first name is Baltazar after his father, but prefers to go by his childhood nickname (meaning potato in Portuguese).
