= Numa Lavanchy =

Swiss footballer (born 1993)

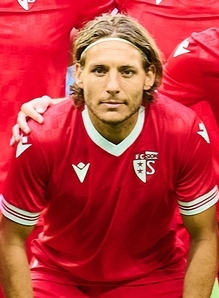

Personal information
- Date of birth: 25 August 1993 (age 33)
- Place of birth: Morges, Switzerland
- Height: 1.74 m (5 ft 9 in)
- Position: Right-back

Team information
- Current team: Sion
- Number: 14

Youth career
- 2007–2009: Lausanne-Sport

Senior career*
Years	Team	Apps	(Gls)
2010–2016	Lausanne-Sport	49	(6)
2015	→ Le Mont (loan)	18	(0)
2016–2019	Grasshoppers	76	(4)
2019–2022	Lugano	114	(9)
2022-	Sion	151	(3)

International career
2009–2010	Switzerland U17	14	(2)
2010–2011	Switzerland U18	7	(2)
- * Club domestic league appearances and goals as of 28 September 2026

Numa Lavanchy (born 25 August 1993) is a Swiss professional footballer who plays for FC Sion.

== Club career ==
Lavanchy started his career with FC Lausanne-Sport as an academy player. At Lausanne he was able to rise through the youth ranks and actually broke into the first-team before he'd even made his reserve team debut. He made his debut for Lausanne-Sport in a Swiss Challenge League match on 15 April 2010 in a 2–2 away draw against FC Biel-Bienne. He would go to make three more appearances during the 2009–10 season though he has not made a league appearance for the club since then. Lavanchy later made his debut for Lausanne's reserve team, Team Vaud, on 17 September 2011 against FC La Tour/Le Pâquier in a 5–2 home win.

Lavanchy joined FC Lugano on 1 February 2019 until June 2021 with an option for a further year.

== International career ==
Lavanchy is a Switzerland youth international having played at both under-17 and under-18 level. In 2010 represented Switzerland at the UEFA Under-17 European Championship.

== Honours ==
Lausanne-Sport

- Swiss Challenge League: 2010–11, 2015–16

Lugano

- Swiss Cup: 2021–22
