= Dejan Sorgić =

Swiss footballer (born 1989)

Personal information
- Date of birth: 15 September 1989 (age 37)
- Place of birth: Knin, SR Croatia, SFR Yugoslavia
- Height: 1.77 m (5 ft 10 in)
- Position: Forward

Team information
- Current team: Vaduz
- Number: 39

Youth career
- 2004–2008: Luzern

Senior career*
Years	Team	Apps	(Gls)
2007–2013	Luzern	12	(0)
2013–2014	Schaffhausen	17	(2)
2014–2016	Kriens	46	(17)
2016–2019	Thun	94	(38)
2019–2020	Auxerre	17	(2)
2020–2023	Luzern	84	(28)
2023–2025	Sion	69	(22)
2025–2026	Yverdon-Sport	21	(7)
2026–	Vaduz	3	(0)
- * Club domestic league appearances and goals as of 9 August 2026

Dejan Sorgić (Serbian Cyrillic: Дејан Соргић; born 15 September 1989) is a Swiss-Croatian professional footballer who plays as a forward for Liechtensteiner Swiss Super League club Vaduz.

== Career ==
On 20 July 2016, he joined Thun on a two-year contract. In October 2021, Sorgić returned to Luzern, signing a contract till 30 June 2023.

On 23 June 2023, Sorgić signed a one-season contract with Sion.

On 26 June 2025, Sorgić joined Yverdon-Sport FC.

== Career statistics ==
As of match played 22 July 2020

Appearances and goals by club, season and competition
Club	Season	League			National cup (Note: Includes Swiss Cup, Coupe de France)		League cup (Note: Includes Coupe de la Ligue)		Other		Total	
Club	Season	Division	Apps	Goals	Apps	Goals	Apps	Goals	Apps	Goals	Apps	Goals
Luzern|	2006–07	Swiss Super League	2	0	0	0	—		—		2	0
Luzern|	2007–08	Swiss Super League	0	0	0	0	—		—		0	0
Luzern|	2008–09	Swiss Super League	1	0	0	0	—		—		1	0
Luzern|	2009–10	Swiss Super League	5	0	1	1	—		—		6	1
Luzern|	2010–11	Swiss Super League	1	0	1	0	—		—		2	0
Luzern|	2011–12	Swiss Super League	1	0	0	0	—		—		1	0
Luzern|	2012–13	Swiss Super League	2	0	0	0	—		—		2	0
Luzern|	Total		12	0	2	1	—		—		14	1
Schaffhausen	2013–14	Swiss Challenge League	17	2	1	0	—		0	0	18	2
Kriens	2014–15	Swiss 1. Liga	23	9	2	1	—		—		25	10
Kriens	2015–16	Swiss Promotion League	23	8	1	1	—		—		24	9
Kriens	Total		46	17	3	2	—		—		49	19
Thun	2016–17	Swiss Super League	32	15	1	0	—		—		33	15
Thun	2017–18	Swiss Super League	28	7	3	1	—		—		31	8
Thun	2018–19	Swiss Super League	33	15	5	3	—		—		38	18
Thun	2019–20	Swiss Super League	1	1	0	0	—		—		1	1
Thun	Total		94	38	9	4	—		—		103	42
Auxerre	2019–20	Ligue 2	16	2	2	1	1	0	—		19	3
Auxerre	2019–20	Ligue 2	1	0	0	0	0	0	—		1	0
Auxerre	Total		17	2	2	1	1	0	—		20	3
Career total			177	58	17	8	0	0	0	0	194	66

== Honours ==
Individual

- Swiss Super League Team of the Year: 2018–19
