= 2014–15 FC Winterthur season =

FC Winterthur
2014–15 season
- Chairman: (Switzerland) Hannes W. Keller
- Manager: Jürgen Seeberger
- Ground: Schützenwiese, Winterthur, Switzerland
- Super League: 4th
- Swiss Cup: 2nd round
- Top goalscorer: League: Patrick Bengondo (20); All: Patrick Bengondo (20)
- Highest home attendance: 3,400 on 30 May 2015 vs Servette
- Lowest home attendance: 1,600 on 25 February 2015 vs FC Le Mont
- Average home league attendance: 2,867

FC Winterthur are a Swiss football team based in Winterthur. The 2014–15 season was their 118th season since their foundation in 1896. In this campaign they competed in two competitions, the 2014–15 Swiss Challenge League and the 2014–15 Swiss Cup. The club played their home games in the Stadion Schützenwiese.

== Overview ==
The club's chairman was Hannes W. Keller. It was his 14th and last season as club chairman and he was in office longer than any club president before him.

The first team played their home games in the Stadion Schützenwiese, which has been their home ground since the club's foundation. To match the Swiss Football League's license requirements introduced in the 2012/13 season, the stadium was modernized in three stages. The first stage contained improvements to the lighting, security, and catering systems, completed by 2013. This was followed by a rebuild of the eastern standing terrace in the second half of 2014 and early 2015. The capacity of the stadium for the 2014–15 season was reduced to approximately 5,000 spectators, due to this renovation. On Monday evening, 2 March 2015, for the championship match against FC Schaffhausen, the new eastern standing terraces ware officially inaugurated and taken into operation. The final renovation of the main stands was to take place 2016.

=== Pre-season ===
The most important issue in the preparation of the new season was only achieved two weeks before the start of the championship, although the change in the position of the head-coach had been announced some time in advance. After five years as boss, but because of the previous disappointing season, coach Boro Kuzmanovic had been dismissed. Jürgen Seeberger was hired a new coach. In his last job in Switzerland he led FC Schaffhausen from the third highest league to the Super League. His previous employer, SV Darmstadt 98, had separated themselves from him in December 2012.

On the transfer front it was soon clear that central defender Sead Hajrović, brother of Izet Hajrovic, would join the club coming from Grasshopper Club. Other important signings were João Paiva, who had been FC Wohlens' top scorer the previous season, center-back Dennis Iapichino, who had spent the previous two season in the Major League Soccer, by Montreal Impact and D.C. United and Marco Köfler from Kapfenberger SV. Furthermore Kristian Nushi joined from St. Gallen, Amin Tighazoui joined from Vaduz and Christian Fassnacht was signed from FC Tuggen.

The three most prominent departures were that of 33-year-old Sawas Exouzidis, who could no longer find a place in the team that Jürgen Seeberger had massively rejuvenated, Kristian Kuzmanovic, who left the club to play for Vaduz after his father had been fired, and Marco Aratore who transferred to St. Gallen in the top level of Swiss football.

=== First half of season ===
The first half of the season started for Winterthur on July 21, 2014 in the Schützenwiese with a home match against FC Wil. The 4–0 win against Wil was the beginning of a first good third of the championship for the club. By the end of September, six of ten games had been ended victorious and only three had ended in a defeat. Winterthur was in second position in the table at that time, five points behind the surprise leader FC Wohlen. Subsequently, however, the team slackened and only two more victories were achieved before the winter break in the remaining eight games. The gap to the top of the table grew to 9 points and the club over wintered in 4th position. The team were along way from being a promotion candidate. Despite everything, the preliminary round was stronger than the previous season and this left a good impression of the coach. In the individual criticism captain Patrick Bengondo emerged best, because he was involved in each second goal.

=== Second half of season ===
In the second half of the season, Winterthur did bot start as well as in the first half of the season. The first six games after the winter break were an up and down with three wins, two defeats and one draw. Then the team collapsed completely and managed just one single point in the following six games. This was the worst run of results that the club had achieved since the 2003–04 season. Although FCW was able to hold the fourth position in the table despite this victoryless phase, the gap to the leader increased from 11 to 33 points and they lost all contact to the extended top group. The 14 points achieved in the final six games didn't help to correct the effect of this slump either.

Winterthur finally finished the season with 53 points in 4th place, 21 points behind the division champions and promotion winners Lugano. In the end, Der Landbote reported a "decent season" for the FCW, but once again missed the "necessary winner mentality". What was remarkable about the 2014–15 season was the home strength and at the same time away weakness of the team. While they were the second-best team in the "home" table, four points behind newly promoted Lugano, on the other hand they were the second-worst team in the league "away" table, with just one point more than the bottom of the table Biel-Bienne. Servette did not obtain a license for the 2015-16 Challenge League season, due to the fact that they did not provide the necessary financial documents and guarantees. Servette was therefore relegated to the Promotion League. Because Servette had their license revoked Biel-Bienne escaped relegation.

=== Swiss Cup ===
Winterthur entered into the 2014–15 Swiss Cup on 23 August 2014 in an away game in the first round against lower tier FC Eschenbach. A tenth minute goal from youngster Mario Budimir put the team on the right track. However, Eschenbach equalised in the 68th minute and Winterthur had to increase the pace. Which they did and Tunahan Cicek and Amin Tighazoui both scored, so that the team could continue to the next round.

In the second round Winterthur were drawn at home to reigning Swiss Champions Basel. The match was played on 21 September in the Schützenwiese in front of a full capacity 5,050 spectators. After a short period of testing, in which the hosts kept up well, FCB took over dictation of the game. Mohamed Elneny brought his colors into the lead after half an hour with a remarkable drop kick from outside the penalty area. This was the start of a final phase of the first half in which the Basel team won the game. Breel Embolo scored twice before the break. After the break, he crowned his performance with his third personal goal, a beautiful lifting ball from a tight angle. This 4–0 also meant the final result. Basel's victory was deserved, but FC Winterthur also played a courageous game and would have deserved a goal for the good performance. The defense in front of Basel's goalkeeper Germano Vailati held things tight and so after the first half hour, there was no longer any doubt as to which of the two teams would reach the next round.

FC Basel continued as far as the final, but here they were beaten by FC Sion. This was the 13th cup win for FC Sion in their 13th final.

== Players ==
Note: Flags indicate national team as defined under FIFA eligibility rules; some limited exceptions apply. Players may hold more than one non-FIFA nationality.

No.	Pos.	Nation	Player
1	GK	SUI	Matthias Minder
—	GK	SUI	David Moser (from Thun)
18	GK	SUI	Yannick Bünzli (from youth team)
3	DF	BRA	Paulo Menezes
4	DF	SUI	Sead Hajrović (from Grasshopper Club)
5	DF	SUI	Stefan Iten
14	DF	SUI	Patrik Schuler
15	DF	SUI	Dennis Iapichino (from D.C. United)
17	DF	SUI	Marco Köfler (from Kapfenberger SV)
21	DF	SUI	Patrik Baumann
23	DF	SUI	Jan Elvedi (from youth team)
25	DF	SUI	Manuel Akanji (from youth team)
27	DF	SUI	Tobias Schättin (from youth team)

No.	Pos.	Nation	Player
7	MF	KOS	Kristian Nushi (from St. Gallen)
8	MF	SUI	Antonio Marchesano
10	MF	FRA	Amin Tighazoui (from Vaduz)
13	MF	SUI	Gianluca D'Angelo
19	MF	SUI	Mario Budimir
20	MF	SUI	Sandro Foschini (from Aarau)
22	MF	SUI	Stefano Milani (from FC Wohlen)
29	MF	TUR	Tunahan Cicek
9	FW	SUI	Patrick Bengondo
11	FW	POR	João Paiva (from FC Wohlen)
16	FW	SUI	Christian Fassnacht (from FC Tuggen)
24	FW	SUI	Genc Krasniqi (from Grasshopper Club)
31	FW	SUI	Simon Mesonero

== Results ==
=== Swiss Challenge League ===
==== Matches ====
21 July 2014 Match 1	Winterthur	4 - 0	Wil	Winterthur
19:45	Paiva 7' 36' 79'; Bengondo 60'	Summary	Silvano Schäppi (yellow card) 65'	Stadium: Stadion Schützenwiese; Attendance: 2,500; Referee: (Switzerland) Lukas Fähndrich

26 July 2014 Match 2	Lugano	2 - 1	Winterthur	Lugano
17:45	Rafael da Silva 3' (pen.) 17' (yellow card) 63'	Summary	D'Angelo (yellow card) 2' (yellow card) 34' (red card); Bengondo 10' (pen.); Tighazoui (yellow card) 79'	Stadium: Cornaredo Stadium; Attendance: 3,225; Referee: (Switzerland) Urs Schnyder

2 August 2014 Match 3	Winterthur	1 - 0	Chiasso	Winterthur
17:45	João Paiva 26'; Bengondo (yellow card) 51'; Cicek (yellow card) 65'	Summary	Michele Monighetti (yellow card) 16'; Diarra (yellow card) 30'; Emmanuele Sembroni (yellow card) 49'	Stadium: Stadion Schützenwiese; Attendance: 2,900; Referee: (Switzerland) Sascha Amhof

9 August 2014 Match 4	Winterthur	4 - 3	Biel-Bienne	Winterthur
17:45	Bengondo 20'; Cicek 54'; D'Angelo 83'; Menezes 87'; Minder (yellow card) 90+1'	Summary	Sheholli (yellow card) 20'; Sejmenović 41'; Norman Peyretti 44' (yellow card) 58'; Kaua Safari 75'; Kamber (yellow card) 83'; Luís Pimenta (yellow card) 90+1'	Stadium: Stadion Schützenwiese; Attendance: 3,100; Referee: (Switzerland) Lukas Fähndrich

13 August 2014 Match 5	Servette	0 - 0	Winterthur	Geneva
19:45	Mfuyi (yellow card) 51'; Müller (yellow card) 70'	Summary	Patrik Schuler (yellow card) 80'; Minder (yellow card) 81'	Stadium: Stade de Genève; Attendance: 2,432; Referee: (Switzerland) Pascal Erlachner

16 August 2014 Match 6	Winterthur	0 - 2	Wohlen	Winterthur
17:45	Marchesano (yellow card) 3'; Patrik Schuler (yellow card) 11'; Bengondo (yellow card) 88'; Hajrović (yellow card) 90+2'	Summary	Brahimi 1'; Pezzoni (yellow card) 8'; Stadelmann (yellow card) 33'; Ramizi 90'	Stadium: Stadion Schützenwiese; Attendance: 3,500; Referee: (Switzerland) Luca Gut

1 September 2014 Match 7	Schaffhausen	1 - 4	Winterthur	Schaffhausen
19:45	Cristian Miani (yellow card) 19' (goal) 47'; N'Dzomo (yellow card) 23' (yellow-red card); Raphael Mollet (yellow card) 82'	Summary	Genc Krasniqi (yellow card) 36'; Iten (yellow card) 43'; D'Angelo (yellow card) 45+2' (goal) 53' 90+5'; João Paiva 55'; Menezes (yellow card) 72'; Bengondo 78'	Stadium: Stadion Breite; Attendance: 2,867; Referee: (Switzerland) Tomasz Supercyznski

14 September 2014 Match 8	Winterthur	2 - 0	FC Le Mont	Winterthur
15:00 CET	João Paiva 16' (yellow card) 74'; Foschini 41'; Iten (yellow card) 56'	Summary	N'Diasse N'Diaye (yellow card) 57'; Berisha (yellow card) 69'; Tall (red card) 73'; Reis (yellow card) 74'; Ndiaye (yellow card) 75'; Gétaz (red card) 90+2'	Stadium: Stadion Schützenwiese; Attendance: 3,100; Referee: (Switzerland) Nicolas Jancevski

24 September 2014 Match 9	Lausanne-Sport	2 - 1	Winterthur	Lausanne
19:45 CET	Rippert (yellow card) 55'; Marazzi 57'; De Pierro 82'	Summary	Bengondo 15' (yellow card) 24'; D'Angelo (yellow card) 49'; Stefano Milani (yellow card) 77'; João Paiva (yellow card) 85'	Stadium: Stade Olympique de la Pontaise; Attendance: 1,450; Referee: (Switzerland) Fedayi San

29 September 2014 Match 10	Winterthur	4 - 2	Servette	Winterthur
19:45 CET	Bengondo 27'; João Paiva 37'; D'Angelo 40'; Cicek 47'	Summary	Avanzini 17'; Vonlanthen 42'; Pasche (yellow card) 84'	Stadium: Stadion Schützenwiese; Attendance: 3,000; Referee: (Poland) Tomasz Superczynski

5 October 2014 Match 11	FC Chiasso	1 - 1	Winterthur	Chiasso
15:00 CET	Emmanuele Sembroni (yellow card) 37'; Mirko Quaresima (yellow card) 61'; Mihajlović 80'; Regazzoni (yellow card) 90+2'	Summary	Akanji (yellow card) 59' (goal) 90'	Stadium: Stadio Comunale; Attendance: 1,000; Referee: (Switzerland) Nicolas Jancevski

18 October 2014 Match 12	FC Le Mont	3 - 2	Winterthur	Baulmes
17:45 CET	Mustafi 27' 58' 78'; Berisha (yellow card) 63'; Araz (yellow card) 88'; Leoni (yellow card) 88'	Summary	Cicek 49'; Hajrović (yellow card) 53'; Tighazoui 70'; D'Angelo (yellow card) 90'	Stadium: Stade Sous-Ville; Attendance: 350; Referee: (Switzerland) Luca Gut

27 October 2014 Match 13	Winterthur	3 - 2	Schaffhausen	Winterthur
19:45 CET	Bengondo (yellow card) 36'; Paiva 38'; Cicek (yellow card) 46'; Schnorf 56' (o.g.); Marchesano 72'; Genc Krasniqi (yellow card) 83'	Summary	Tadić 9'; Gül 45'; Schnorf (yellow card) 51'; Ivić (yellow card) 86'	Stadium: Stadion Schützenwiese; Attendance: 3,300; Referee: (Switzerland) Nikolaj Hänni

1 November 2014 Match 14	FC Winterthur	0 - 0	Lugano	Winterthur
17:45 CET	Krasniqi (yellow card) 28'	Summary	Urbano (yellow card) 56'; Toretti (yellow card) 88'	Stadium: Stadion Schützenwiese; Attendance: 3,100; Referee: (Switzerland) Urs Schnyder

8 November 2014 Match 15	Wil	0 - 3	FC Winterthur	Wil
17:45 CET		Summary	Bengondo 24' 30' (yellow card) 66'; Marchesano 87'	Stadium: IGP Arena; Attendance: 1,740; Referee: (Switzerland) Esther Staubli

23 November 2014 Match 16	FC Winterthur	0 - 1	Lausanne-Sport	Winterthur
15:00 CET	Paulinho (red card) 18'; D'Angelo (yellow card) 64'	Summary	Dupuis 19' (pen.); Rippert (yellow card) 27' (yellow card) 69' (red card); Savic (yellow card) 90'	Stadium: Stadion Schützenwiese; Attendance: 3,000; Referee: (Poland) Tomasz Superczynski

30 November 2014 Match 17	Biel	2 - 2	Winterthur	Biel
15:00 CET	Manière (yellow card) 23'; Siegrist 63'; Safari 74'; Salamand (yellow card) 90+2'	Summary	Bengondo 46' (yellow card) 88' (yellow card) 90+3' (red card); Paiva 61'; Krasniqi (yellow card) 90'	Stadium: Stadion Gurzelen; Attendance: 868; Referee: (Switzerland) Roland Huwiler

7 December 2014 Match 18	Wohlen	1 - 0	Winterthur	Wohlen
15:00 CET	Ramizi (yellow card) 33' (goal) 83'; Minkwitz (yellow card) 61'; Brahimi (yellow card) 84'; Thaqi (yellow card) 89'	Summary	D'Angelo (yellow card) 40'; Paiva (yellow card) 67'	Stadium: Stadion Niedermatten; Attendance: 1,650; Referee: (Switzerland) Nicolas Jancevski

25 February 2015 Match 19	Winterthur	2 - 1	FC Le Mont	Winterthur
19:45 CET	Foschini 36'; D'Angelo (yellow card) 54' (yellow card) 56' (red card); Krasniqi 88'	Summary	Reis (yellow card) 31'; Sessolo 82'	Stadium: Stadion Schützenwiese; Attendance: 1,600; Referee: (Switzerland) Pascal Erlachner

18 March 2015 Match 20	Biel	4 - 1	Winterthur	Biel
18:30 CET	Ukoh 30'; Cidimar 45' 76'; Peyretti 84'	Summary	Paiva 4' (yellow card) 32'; Paulinho (yellow card) 28'; Schuler (yellow card) 62'	Stadium: Gurzelen; Attendance: 982; Referee: (Switzerland) Stephan Studer

21 February 2015 Match 21	Wil	2 - 2	Winterthur	Wil
17:45 CET	Lekaj (yellow card) 14'; Stillhart 49' (yellow card) 61'; Koller 67'; Sacirovic (yellow card) 88'	Summary	Krasniqi 57' (yellow card) 32'; Paiva 65'	Stadium: IGP Arena; Attendance: 1,450; Referee: (Switzerland) Nicolas Jancevski

2 March 2015 Match 22	Winterthur	2 - 1	Schaffhausen	Winterthur
19:45 CET	Cicek 8' (yellow card) 8'; Foschini 17'; Schuler (yellow card) 27'	Summary	Gonçalves (yellow card) 45+1'; Almerares 58'; Mariani (yellow card) 80'	Stadium: Stadion Schützenwiese; Attendance: 3,200; Referee: (Switzerland) Luca Gut

7 March 2015 Match 23	Servette	2 - 1	Winterthur	Geneva
16:00 CET	Dams (yellow card) 47'; Gazzetta 58' (yellow card) 59'; Vonlanthen 63'; Doumbia (yellow card) 87'	Summary	Bengondo (yellow card) 18'; Paiva 69'; D'Angelo (yellow card) 85'	Stadium: Stade de Genève; Attendance: 4,039; Referee: (Bulgaria) Vladimir Ovcharov

14 March 2015 Match 24	Winterthur	4 - 1	Lausanne-Sport	Winterthur
17:45 CET	Foschini 7'; Bengondo 11'; Paiva 50'; Cicek (yellow card) 67'; Nushi 90+3'	Summary	Malonga (yellow card) 42'; Krasniqi (yellow card) 85'; Dessarzin 90'	Stadium: Stadion Schützenwiese; Attendance: 3,000; Referee: (Switzerland) Lionel Tschudi

22 March 2015 Match 25	Lugano	3 - 0	Winterthur	Lugano
15:00 CET	Paçarizi (yellow card) 14'; Rey (yellow card) 45+2'; Tosetti (yellow card) 56'; Rossini 66' 68'; Cortelezzi 89'	Summary	Iapichino (yellow card) 13'; Paulinho (red card) 45+2'; Akanji (yellow card) 90+1'	Stadium: Stadio Cornaredo; Attendance: 2,847; Referee: (Switzerland) Sascha Amhof

2 April 2015 Match 26	Winterthur	1 - 2	Wohlen	Winterthur
19:45 CET	Cicek 22'	Summary	Pezzoni 7'; Rapp 55'; Buess (yellow card) 71'	Stadium: Stadion Schützenwiese; Attendance: 2,600; Referee: (Switzerland) Luca Gut

11 April 2015 Match 27	Winterthur	0 - 0	Chiasso	Winterthur
17:45 CET	Iapichino (yellow card) 46'; Hajrović (yellow card) 77'	Summary	Parfait (yellow card) 43'	Stadium: Stadion Schützenwiese; Attendance: 2,500; Referee: (Bulgaria) Vladimir Ovcharov

20 April 2015 Match 28	Schaffhausen	3 - 2	Winterthur	Schaffhausen
19:45	Tadic 29'; Alioski (yellow card) 35'; Bunjaku (yellow card) 41'; Mariani (yellow card) 52' (goal) 57'; Dos Santos 65'	Summary	Bengondo 78'; Tighazoui 88'	Stadium: Stadion Breite; Attendance: 2,559; Referee: (Switzerland) Roland Huwiler

25 April 2015 Match 29	Winterthur	0 - 1	Lugano	Winterthur
17:45 CET	Iten (yellow card) 87'	Summary	Basic 37'; Lombardi (yellow card) 64'; Malvino (yellow card) 66'; Melazzi (yellow card) 74'; Sabbatini (yellow card) 90+4'	Stadium: Stadion Schützenwiese; Attendance: 2,500; Referee: (Poland) Tomasz Superczynski

29 April 2015 Match 30	Wohlen	2 - 1	Winterthur	Wohlen
19:45	Schultz 26'; Ramizi (yellow card) 38'; Giampà (yellow card) 42'; Brahimi (yellow card) 60'; Geissmann 87'	Summary	Iapichino (yellow card) 11'; Fassnacht 82'	Stadium: Stadion Niedermatten; Attendance: 1,240; Referee: (Switzerland) Esther Staubli

3 May 2015 Match 31	Winterthur	5 - 2	Biel	Winterthur
15:00 CET	Foschini 11' (yellow card) 44'; Schuler (yellow card) 13' (yellow card) 33' (red card); Tighazoui 17' 40'; Paiva 54'; Bengondo 90+4'	Summary	Cidimar 69' (pen.); Morello (yellow card) 71'; Safari (yellow card) 77'; Pimenta 84'; Sabbatini (yellow card) 90+4'	Stadium: Stadion Schützenwiese; Attendance: 2,000; Referee: (Switzerland) Fedayi San

10 May 2015 Match 32	FC Le Mont	1 - 3	Winterthur	Baulmes
15:00	Reis (red card) 12'; Dubajic 34' (yellow card) 65'; Chappuis (yellow card) 48'; Tall (yellow card) 74'	Summary	Bengondo 14' (pen.) (yellow card) 79'; Iten (yellow card) 45+3'; Tighazoui 77'; Cicek 90+1'	Stadium: Stade Sous-Ville; Attendance: 350; Referee: (Switzerland) Lukas Fähndrich

17 May 2015 Match 33	Chiasso	0 - 0	Winterthur	Chiasso
15:00	Maccoppi (yellow card) 31'; Regazzoni (yellow card) 45'	Summary	Köfler (yellow card) 32'; Akanji (yellow card) 90+3'	Stadium: Stadio Comunale; Attendance: 1,000; Referee: (Switzerland) Lionel Tschudi

22 May 2015 Match 34	Winterthur	4 - 1	Wil	Winterthur
19:45 CET	Bengondo 5' (pen.) 69'; Paiva 25'; D'Angelo 60'; Akanji (yellow card) 90+3'	Summary	Cerrone 14' (pen.); Matri (yellow card) 89'	Stadium: Stadion Schützenwiese; Attendance: 3,300; Referee: (Switzerland) Urs Schnyder

25 May 2015 Match 35	Lausanne-Sport	1 - 1	Winterthur	Lausanne
18:00	Dessarzin 22'	Summary	D'Angelo 75'	Stadium: Stade Olympique de la Pontaise; Attendance: 1,030; Referee: (Qatar) Khamis Mohammed Al Marri

30 May 2015 Match 36	Winterthur	4 - 0	Servette	Winterthur
19:45 CET	Tighazoui 26' (yellow card) 43'; Bengondo 59'; Trachsel 77'; Fassnacht 90+2'	Summary		Stadium: Stadion Schützenwiese; Attendance: 3,400; Referee: (Switzerland) Roland Huwiler

==== League standings ====
Pos	Team	Pld	W	D	L	GF	GA	GD	Pts	Promotion or relegation
1	Lugano (C, P)	36	22	8	6	64	31	+33	74	Promotion to 2015–16 Swiss Super League
2	Servette (R)	36	20	7	9	51	40	+11	67	Relegation to 2015–16 1. Liga Promotion (Note: Servette did not obtain a license for the 2015-16 Challenge League season, due to the fact that they did not provide the necessary financial documents and guarantees. Servette was therefore relegated to the Promotion League.)
3	Wohlen	36	20	4	12	57	43	+14	64	
4	Winterthur	36	15	8	13	65	49	+16	53	
5	Schaffhausen	36	13	8	15	55	54	+1	47	
6	Lausanne-Sport	36	12	8	16	47	57	−10	44	
7	Le Mont	36	10	9	17	39	56	−17	39	
8	Chiasso	36	9	12	15	30	49	−19	39	
9	Wil	36	9	10	17	47	63	−16	37	
10	Biel-Bienne	36	7	12	17	39	52	−13	33	Remain in 2015–16 Swiss Challenge League (Note: Because Servette had their license revoked Biel-Bienne escaped relegation.)

Source: Swiss Challenge League at SFL
Rules for classification: 1) points; 2) goal difference; 3) number of goals scored
(C) Champions; (P) Promoted; (R) Relegated

=== Swiss Cup ===
23 August 2014 Round 1	FC Eschenbach	1 - 3	FC Winterthur	Eschenbach
17:00 CET	Silvan Sager (yellow card) 42'; Raphael Felder 67'	Summary	Budimir 10'; Cicek 74'; Tighazoui 81'; Krasniqi (yellow card) 90'	Stadium: Sportplatz Weiherhaus; Attendance: 800; Referee: (Switzerland) Tschudin

21 September 2014 Round 2	FC Winterthur	0 - 4	FC Basel	Winterthur
14:00 CET	Bengondo (yellow card) 14'; Iapichino (red card) 71'	Summary (FCB Report)	Elneny 31' (yellow card) 45'; Embolo 36' 43' 66'; Díaz (yellow card) 64'	Stadium: Stadion Schützenwiese; Attendance: 5,050 (sold out); Referee: (Switzerland) Stephan Studer

== Sources ==
- Swiss Challenge League 2014–15 at RSSSF
