= 2016–17 Swiss Challenge League =

Swiss Challenge League
- Season: 2016–17
- Champions: Zürich
- Promoted: Zürich
- Relegated: Le Mont
- Matches: 180
- Goals: 529 (2.94 per match)
- Top goalscorer: Jean-Pierre Nsamé (23 goals)
- Biggest home win: Servette 6–1 Wohlen (11 September 2016); Schaffhausen 5–0 Chiasso (8 April 2017)
- Biggest away win: Chiasso 0–6 Schaffhausen (15 May 2017)
- Highest scoring: Zürich 6–3 Aarau (6 November 2016)
- Longest winning run: Schaffhausen (8 games)
- Longest unbeaten run: Zürich (18 games)
- Longest winless run: Wil (17 games)
- Longest losing run: Aarau; Schaffhausen (7 games)
- Highest attendance: 14,455; Zürich 3–0 Wohlen (3 June 2017)
- Total attendance: 505,117
- Average attendance: 2,806

The 2016–17 Swiss Challenge League, known for sponsorship reasons as the Brack.ch Challenge League, was the 14th season of the Swiss Challenge League, the second tier in the Swiss football pyramid. It began on 23 July 2016 and ended on 3 June 2017.

On 1 May 2017 FC Le Mont decided to voluntarily relegate three steps down in the league system after being denied a licence to play in the Swiss Challenge League.

On 18 May 2017, Zürich became champions of the 2016–17 Challenge League following their 1–1 draw against Servette and Neuchâtel Xamax's 2–1 defeat at Schaffhausen. They are thus promoted back to the top flight immediately following their relegation the previous season.

== Participating teams ==
2015–16 Swiss Challenge League champions FC Lausanne-Sport were promoted to the 2016–17 Swiss Super League. They were replaced by FC Zürich, who got relegated after last place finish in the 2015–16 Swiss Super League. FC Biel-Bienne got relegated from the Challenge League as the Swiss Football League stripped Biel-Bienne of their league licence. Servette FC won promotion from the 2015–16 1. Liga Promotion.

=== Stadia and locations ===
Locations of clubs in the 2016–17 Challenge League

Team	Venue	Capacity
FC Aarau	Stadion Brügglifeld	8,000
FC Chiasso	Stadio Comunale Riva IV	5,000
FC Le Mont	Stade Sous-Ville	4,000
Neuchâtel Xamax	Stade de la Maladière	12,000
Servette FC	Stade de Genève	30,084
FC Schaffhausen	Stadion Breite; LIPO Park Schaffhausen	4,200; 8,200
FC Wil	IGP Arena	6,958
FC Winterthur	Schützenwiese	8,550
FC Wohlen	Stadion Niedermatten	3,624
FC Zürich	Letzigrund	23,605

=== Personnel and kits ===
Team	Manager	Kit manufacturer
FC Aarau	(Switzerland) Marco Schällibaum	Nike
FC Chiasso	(Italy) Baldo Raineri	Primato
FC Le Mont	(Switzerland) John Dragani	Karhu
Neuchâtel Xamax	(Switzerland) Michel Decastel	Erima
FC Schaffhausen	(Switzerland) Murat Yakin	gpard
Servette FC	(Bosnia and Herzegovina) Meho Kodro	14fourteen
FC Wil	(Italy) Maurizio Jacobacci	Nike
FC Winterthur	(Switzerland) Umberto Romano (interim)	gpard
FC Wohlen	(Italy) Francesco Gabriele	Adidas
FC Zürich	(Italy) Uli Forte	Nike

=== Managerial changes ===
Club	Name	Date of departure	Position in table	Replacement	Date of appointment
Wil	(Turkey) Ugur Tütüneker	24 August 2016	7th	(Switzerland) Martin Rueda	3 September 2016
Wohlen	(Switzerland) Martin Rueda	2 September 2016	9th	(Italy) Francesco Gabriele	7 September 2016
Schaffhausen	(Germany) Axel Thoma	7 December 2016	10th	(Austria) Nedjad Kuruzovic	Interim
Wil	(Switzerland) Martin Rueda	12 December 2016	3rd	(Germany) Ronny Teuber	12 December 2016
Schaffhausen	(Austria) Nedjad Kuruzovic	Interim	10th	(Switzerland) Murat Yakin	21 December 2016
Servette	(France) Anthony Braizat	30 December 2016	5th	(Bosnia and Herzegovina) Meho Kodro	30 December 2016
Winterthur	(Switzerland) Sven Christ	14 February 2017	9th	(Switzerland) Umberto Romano	Interim
Wil	(Germany) Ronny Teuber	27 March 2017	6th	(Italy) Maurizio Jacobacci	27 March 2017
Chiasso	(Italy) Giuseppe Scienza	18 April 2017	10th	(Italy) Baldo Raineri	18 April 2017

== League table ==
Pos	Team	Pld	W	D	L	GF	GA	GD	Pts	Promotion or relegation
1	Zürich (C, P)	36	26	7	3	91	30	+61	85	Promotion to 2017–18 Swiss Super League
2	Neuchâtel Xamax	36	22	7	7	66	36	+30	73	
3	Servette	36	18	8	10	55	43	+12	62	
4	Schaffhausen	36	16	3	17	64	59	+5	51	
5	Aarau	36	13	6	17	57	64	−7	45	
6	Winterthur	36	11	8	17	45	62	−17	41	
7	Wohlen	36	12	3	21	42	60	−18	39	
8	Chiasso	36	9	10	17	43	63	−20	37	
9	Le Mont (Note: Le Mont will take voluntary relegation three steps down) (R)	36	8	11	17	31	54	−23	35	Relegation to 2017–18 2. Liga Interregional
10	Wil (Note: Wil were deducted three points for licence rules violation)	36	10	7	19	35	58	−23	34	

Source: Swiss Challenge League
Rules for classification: 1) points; 2) goal difference; 3) number of goals scored; 4) head-to-head points; 5) draw
(C) Champions; (P) Promoted; (R) Relegated

== Results ==
=== First and Second Round ===
Home \ Away	AAR	CHI	LMT	NEU	SHA	SER	WIL	WIN	WOH	ZÜR
Aarau		1–1	2–1	2–3	3–2	2–0	0–1	1–1	1–0	1–1
Chiasso	3–1		1–2	1–2	2–3	2–2	0–4	0–1	0–2	0–2
Le Mont	0–0	0–0		1–0	1–0	0–2	0–0	1–1	0–3	0–2
Neuchâtel	4–1	3–0	2–1		2–0	2–1	3–2	4–1	1–4	1–3
Schaffhausen	2–3	1–2	1–2	1–4		1–2	1–0	2–2	0–1	1–3
Servette	1–0	1–1	2–1	0–0	0–2		2–1	1–1	6–1	0–4
Wil	0–0	0–0	2–0	0–0	2–1	2–0		5–1	1–2	1–1
Winterthur	1–2	1–1	0–0	0–1	0–1	3–2	3–0		1–0	0–2
Wohlen	1–4	1–2	0–1	0–0	4–0	1–2	1–3	1–0		0–5
Zürich	6–3	1–0	1–1	1–0	5–2	3–0	2–0	2–0	4–0	

Source: Swiss Challenge League
Legend: Blue = home team win; Yellow = draw; Red = away team win.

=== Third and Fourth Round ===
Home \ Away	AAR	CHI	LMT	NEU	SHA	SER	WIL	WIN	WOH	ZÜR
Aarau		2–3	4–2	2–0	2–2	0–1	4–0	2–3	0–3	3–1
Chiasso	5–1		2–2	0–2	0–6	1–1	3–1	4–1	0–0	1–2
Le Mont	1–0	2–1		1–2	0–2	0–1	0–1	1–0	1–2	2–5
Neuchâtel	3–1	3–0	2–2		0–2	1–0	3–1	4–1	3–1	1–1
Schaffhausen	4–0	5–0	2–2	2–1		2–1	3–0	2–1	3–2	0–4
Servette	1–0	2–2	2–1	1–1	3–2		2–0	2–3	2–0	2–1
Wil	0–3	1–3	0–0	0–4	2–1	0–3		0–1	1–4	0–4
Winterthur	3–2	3–1	4–1	0–1	1–3	1–4	1–1		2–1	0–3
Wohlen	1–2	0–1	0–0	1–2	0–1	0–2	2–1	2–1		1–4
Zürich	3–2	1–1	5–1	1–1	2–1	1–1	0–2	2–2	3–0	

Source: Swiss Challenge League
Legend: Blue = home team win; Yellow = draw; Red = away team win.

== Awards ==
Swiss Football League Awards 2016
Award	Winner	Club
Player of the Season	(Cameroon) Jean-Pierre Nsame	Servette FC

Brack.ch Challenge League Dream Team 2016
Position	Player	Nationality	Club
Goalkeeper	Andris Vaņins	Latvia	FC Zürich
Defender	Cédric Brunner	Switzerland	FC Zürich
Defender	Alain Nef	Switzerland	FC Zürich
Defender	Ivan Kecojević	Montenegro	FC Zürich
Defender	Kay Voser	Switzerland	FC Zürich
Midfielder	Adrian Winter	Switzerland	FC Zürich
Midfielder	Oliver Buff	Switzerland	FC Zürich
Midfielder	Burim Kukeli	Albania	FC Zürich
Midfielder	Raphaël Nuzzolo	Switzerland	Neuchâtel Xamax
Forward	Gaëtan Karlen	Switzerland	FC Le Mont
Forward	Jean-Pierre Nsame	Cameroon	Servette FC
