= 2014–15 Swiss Challenge League =

Swiss Challenge League
- Season: 2014–15
- Champions: Lugano
- Promoted: Lugano
- Relegated: Servette
- Matches: 180
- Goals: 494 (2.74 per match)
- Top goalscorer: Igor Tadić (19 goals)
- Biggest home win: Lugano 5–1 Chiasso; 4–0 6 games
- Biggest away win: 0–4 2 games
- Average attendance: 1863

The 2014-15 Swiss Challenge League, known for sponsorship reasons as the Brack.ch Challenge League, was the 12th season of the Swiss Challenge League, the second tier in the Swiss football pyramid. It began on 19 July 2014 and was scheduled to end on 30 May 2015. The league was on winter break between 8 December 2014 and 7 February 2015. Servette were forcibly relegated at the end of the season after their failure to acquire a license for the 2015-16 season.

== Participating teams ==
=== Stadia and locations ===
Locations of clubs in the 2013–14 Challenge League

Team	Venue	Capacity
FC Biel-Bienne	Gurzelen Stadion	3,000
FC Chiasso	Stadio Comunale	5,000
FC Lausanne-Sport	Pontaise	8,500
FC Lugano	Stadio Cornaredo	10,500
FC Schaffhausen	Stadion Breite	4,200
Servette FC	Stade de Genève	30,084
FC Wil	Stadion Bergholz	6,958
FC Winterthur	Schützenwiese	8,550
FC Wohlen	Stadion Niedermatten	3,624
FC Le Mont	Terrain du Châtaignier	4,000

=== Personnel and kits ===
Team	Manager	Kit manufacturer	Sponsor
FC Biel-Bienne	(Switzerland) Jean-Michel Aeby	Nike	Fors
FC Chiasso	(Switzerland) Marco Schällibaum	Primato	Caffè Chicco D'Oro
FC Lausanne-Sport	(Italy) Marco Simone (sacked after round 25) (Switzerland) Fabio Celestini (from round 26 on)	Adidas	BCV
FC Lugano	(Switzerland) Livio Bordoli	Acerbis	AIL; KatalTherm Service
FC Schaffhausen	(Italy) Maurizio Jacobacci	Spard	Ersparnikasse Schaffhausen; Methabau
Servette FC	(England) Kevin Cooper	14Fourteen	GHI
FC Wil	(Italy) Francesco Gabriele	Nike	Hans Eisenring
FC Winterthur	(Germany) Jürgen Seeberger	Spard	Keller
FC Wohlen	(Switzerland) Ciriaco Sforza	Adidas	IBW
FC Le Mont	(France) Claude Gross		Roduit SA

== League table ==
Pos	Team	Pld	W	D	L	GF	GA	GD	Pts	Promotion or relegation
1	Lugano (C, P)	36	22	8	6	64	31	+33	74	Promotion to 2015–16 Swiss Super League
2	Servette (D, R)	36	20	7	9	51	40	+11	67	Relegation to 2015–16 1. Liga Promotion (Note: Servette did not obtain a license for the 2015-16 Challenge League season after not providing necessary financial documents and guarantees. Servette was therefore relegated to the Promotion League and Biel-Bienne remained in the league.)
3	Wohlen	36	20	4	12	57	43	+14	64	
4	Winterthur	36	15	8	13	65	49	+16	53	
5	Schaffhausen	36	13	8	15	55	54	+1	47	
6	Lausanne-Sport	36	12	8	16	47	57	−10	44	
7	Le Mont	36	10	9	17	39	56	−17	39	
8	Chiasso	36	9	12	15	30	49	−19	39	
9	Wil	36	9	10	17	47	63	−16	37	
10	Biel-Bienne	36	7	12	17	39	52	−13	33	

Source: Swiss Challenge League
Rules for classification: 1) points; 2) goal difference; 3) number of goals scored
(C) Champions; (D) Disqualified; (P) Promoted; (R) Relegated

== Results ==
=== First and Second Round ===
Home \ Away	BB	CHI	LAS	LMT	LUG	SHA	SER	WIL	WIN	WOH
Biel-Bienne		0–1	0–1	1–0	0–1	1–2	0–1	4–1	2–2	2–2
Chiasso	2–2		4–1	1–1	1–0	1–3	0–1	0–2	1–1	0–1
Lausanne-Sport	4–2	2–0		1–1	1–1	1–2	1–3	1–0	2–1	0–1
Le Mont	1–0	0–1	1–1		0–0	1–4	0–1	2–2	3–2	0–2
Lugano	2–1	5–1	2–1	3–1		5–2	2–0	1–1	2–1	1–2
Schaffhausen	0–0	4–0	2–2	1–2	0–0		0–1	0–3	1–4	0–1
Servette	2–1	3–1	2–1	2–0	1–1	1–1		1–2	0–0	1–0
Wil	0–0	2–3	0–1	4–2	1–2	5–2	1–0		0–3	2–4
Winterthur	4–3	1–0	0–1	2–0	0–0	3–2	4–2	4–0		0–2
Wohlen	4–0	0–0	1–3	0–0	0–2	2–2	4–2	2–1	1–0	

Source: Swiss Challenge League
Legend: Blue = home team win; Yellow = draw; Red = away team win.

=== Third and Fourth Round ===
Home \ Away	BB	CHI	LAS	LMT	LUG	SHA	SER	WIL	WIN	WOH
Biel-Bienne		1–2	1–0	0–2	0–2	0–0	0–1	0–0	4–1	2–1
Chiasso	0–2		1–1	0–3	1–2	0–0	1–1	1–1	0–0	2–0
Lausanne-Sport	2–2	1–1		1–0	0–1	0–4	0–1	3–1	1–1	0–1
Le Mont	1–1	0–1	2–1		3–2	0–3	2–2	4–0	1–3	0–4
Lugano	1–1	4–1	2–1	3–0		2–1	2–0	0–0	3–0	2–3
Schaffhausen	1–0	3–1	0–3	1–1	0–1		1–2	0–1	3–2	1–2
Servette	1–1	1–0	4–2	1–2	2–0	1–2		2–1	2–1	3–1
Wil	1–1	0–0	4–0	3–1	2–5	3–4	0–0		2–2	0–2
Winterthur	5–2	0–0	4–1	2–1	0–1	2–1	4–0	4–1		1–2
Wohlen	1–2	0–1	4–5	0–1	2–1	0–2	1–3	2–0	2–1	

Source: Swiss Challenge League
Legend: Blue = home team win; Yellow = draw; Red = away team win.

== Season statistics ==
=== Top scorers ===
Rank	Player	Club	Goals
1	(Switzerland) Igor Tadić	Schaffhausen	19
2	(Cameroon) Patrick Bengondo	Winterthur	16
3	(Portugal) João Paiva	Winterthur	15
4	(Romania) Cristian Ianu	Lausanne	13
5	(Switzerland) Davide Mariani	Schaffhausen	12
5	(Switzerland) Simone Rapp	Wohlen	12

As of 30 May 2015

== Awards ==
Swiss Football League Awards 2014
Award	Winner	Club
Best Player	(Romania) Cristian Ianu	FC Luzern / FC Lausanne-Sport

Brack.ch Challenge League Dream Team 2014
Position	Player	Club
Goalkeeper	(Switzerland) Francesco Russo	FC Chiasso
Defender	(Switzerland) Anthony Sauthier	Servette FC
Defender	(Germany) Niklas Dams	FC Wohlen
Defender	(Switzerland) Orlando Urbano	FC Wohlen
Defender	(North Macedonia) Ezgjan Alioski	FC Schaffhausen
Midfielder	(Kosovo) Mërgim Brahimi	FC Wil
Midfielder	(Germany) Kevin Pezzoni	FC Aarau
Midfielder	(Croatia) Marko Bašić	FC Lugano
Midfielder	(Switzerland) Johan Vonlanthen	Servette FC
Forward	(Cameroon) Patrick Bengondo	FC Le Mont
Forward	(Romania) Cristian Ianu	FC Wohlen
