= Jetmir Krasniqi =

Kosovar footballer (born 1995)

Personal information
- Date of birth: 27 June 1995 (age 31)
- Place of birth: Nyon, Switzerland
- Height: 1.81 m (5 ft 11 in)
- Position: Defender

Team information
- Current team: Neuchâtel Xamax
- Number: 25

Youth career
- –2010: Stade Nyonnais
- 2010–2014: Lausanne-Sport

Senior career*
Years	Team	Apps	(Gls)
2014–2017	Lausanne-Sport	31	(0)
2016–2017	→ Le Mont (loan)	28	(0)
2017–2018	Chiasso	16	(0)
2018–2019	Lugano	8	(1)
2019	→ Voluntari (loan)	2	(0)
2019–2024	Schaffhausen	128	(5)
2024–2025	Bellinzona	26	(0)
2025–	Neuchâtel Xamax	6	(0)

International career^{‡}
2014–2015	Switzerland U20	5	(0)
2014	Switzerland U21	1	(0)
2018	Kosovo	1	(0)
- * Club domestic league appearances and goals as of 26 May 2026 ‡ National team caps and goals as of 29 May 2018

Jetmir Krasniqi (born 27 June 1995) is a professional footballer who plays as a defender for Neuchâtel Xamax. Born in Switzerland, and a former Swiss youth international, he represents the Kosovo national team.

== Early life ==
Krasniqi was born in Nyon, Switzerland from Kosovo Albanian parents.

== Club career ==
=== Lugano ===
On 15 January 2018. Krasniqi signed Swiss Super League side Lugano. On 10 February 2018, he made his debut in a 1–0 home win against Sion after coming on as a substitute at 86th minute in place of Domen Črnigoj.

== International career ==
=== Switzerland ===
==== Under-20 ====
On 4 September 2014. Krasniqi made his debut with Switzerland U20 in a 2014–15 Under-20 Four Nations Tournament match against Poland U20 after coming on as a substitute at 62nd minute in place of Admir Seferagić.

==== Under-21 ====
On 18 November 2014. Krasniqi made his debut with Switzerland U21 in a friendly match against Scotland U21 after coming on as a substitute at 74th minute in place of Saidy Janko.

=== Kosovo ===
On 23 May 2018. Krasniqi received a call-up from Kosovo for a friendly match against Albania and made his debut after coming on as a substitute at 68th minute in place of Mërgim Vojvoda.

== Career statistics ==
=== Club ===
As of 13 May 2018

Club	Season	League			Cup		Continental		Other		Total	
Club	Season	Division	Apps	Goals	Apps	Goals	Apps	Goals	Apps	Goals	Apps	Goals
Lausanne-Sport	2014–15	Swiss Challenge League	26	0	1	0	—				27	0
Lausanne-Sport	2015–16	Swiss Challenge League	5	0	1	0	—				6	0
Lausanne-Sport	Total		31	0	2	0	—				33	0
Le Mont (loan)	2016–17	Swiss Challenge League	28	0	2	0	—				30	0
Le Mont (loan)	Total		28	0	2	0	—				30	0
Chiasso	2017–18	Swiss Challenge League	16	0	2	0	—				18	0
Chiasso	Total		16	0	2	0	—				18	0
Lugano	2017–18	Swiss Super League	8	1	0	0	—				8	1
Lugano	Total		8	1	0	0	—				8	1
Career total			83	1	6	0	—				89	1
