= Sead Hajrović =

Bosnian footballer (born 1993)

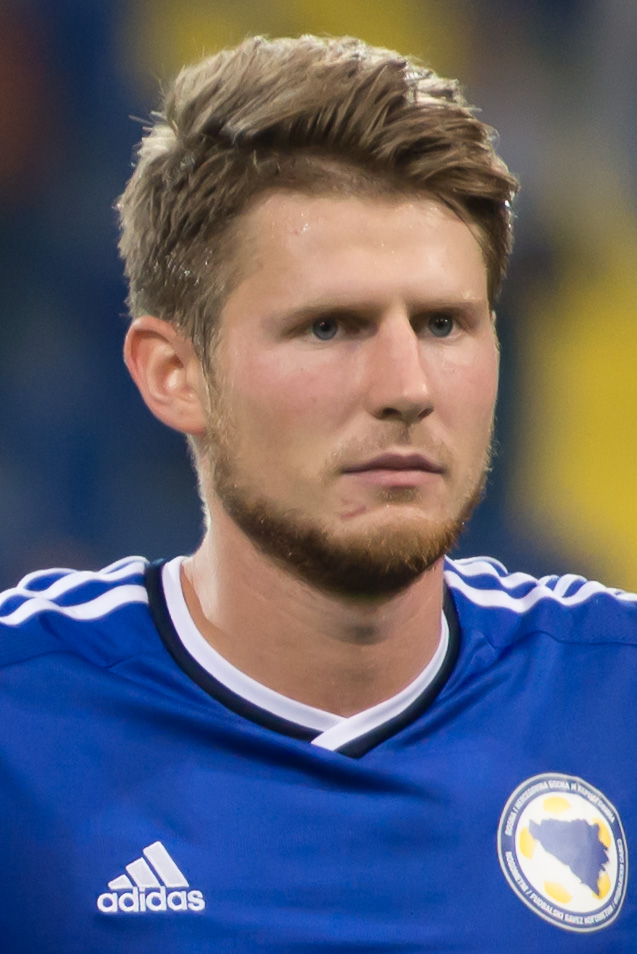
- Hajrović with Bosnia and Herzegovina U21 in 2014

Personal information
- Date of birth: 4 June 1993 (age 33)
- Place of birth: Brugg, Switzerland
- Height: 1.86 m (6 ft 1 in)
- Position: Centre back

Team information
- Current team: Düdingen (manager)

Youth career
- Grasshoppers
- 2009–2011: Arsenal

Senior career*
Years	Team	Apps	(Gls)
2011–2013	Arsenal	0	(0)
2012	→ Barnet (loan)	10	(0)
2013–2014	Grasshoppers	2	(0)
2014–2016	FC Winterthur	67	(0)
2016–2018	FC Wohlen	58	(3)
2018–2020	FC Winterthur	45	(2)
2020–2021	Viktoria Köln	34	(0)
2021–2023	Yverdon-Sport	57	(0)
2023–2024	Xamax	34	(0)
2025	Düdingen	7	(0)

International career
2008	Switzerland U15	6	(0)
2009	Switzerland U17	8	(0)
2010–2011	Switzerland U18	11	(0)
2011–2012	Switzerland U19	6	(0)
2013–2014	Bosnia and Herzegovina U21	4	(0)

Managerial career
- 2025–: Düdingen
- * Club domestic league appearances and goals

Sead Hajrović (born 4 June 1993) is a professional football coach and a former player who is the manager of Swiss club Düdingen. Born in Switzerland, he represented the country internationally on junior levels before switching to representing Bosnia and Herzegovina.

== Club career ==
=== Arsenal ===
Hajrović officially signed professional terms on 7 July 2011 after signing for Arsenal as a scholar in the summer of 2009, arriving from Grasshoppers in his home country.

He went on loan to Barnet and made his debut on 28 January 2012 against Crewe Alexandra, coming on as a substitute. Although his spell with Barnet was hampered somewhat by injury, he made 10 appearances as the Bees avoided relegation from League Two.

In an interview with Mugais Jahangir, the Editor of The Gooner Thoughts, Hajrović talked about his time at Arsenal and Arsene Wenger as his coach, who he describes as 'motivating'.

He [Arsene Wenger] is a great coach and he definitely knows what he is doing. He also gives a lot of young players chances to be involved with the first team and if you would have the chance to speak to him for a few minutes, you would never forget that conversation. He would motivate you in every possible way and tell you exactly what is good and where you have to improve.

On 4 December 2012, Hajrović was included in Arsenal's trip to Olympiacos as an unused substitute.

In May 2013, Hajrović was released by Arsenal to look for a different team where he plans to start regularly.

=== Grasshopper ===
On 5 August 2013, Hajrović signed a two-year contract with Grasshopper Club Zürich.

=== Winterthur ===
On 1 July 2014, Hajrović signed another two-year contract with FC Winterthur after terminating his previous contract with Grasshopper.

=== Wohlen ===
On 14 June 2016, Hajrović joined FC Wohlen, signing a three-year contract.

=== Viktoria Koln ===
On 16 January 2020, Hajrović joined German side Viktoria Köln.

=== Xamax ===
On 26 June 2023, Hajrović joined Challenge League side Xamax.

== International career ==
Hajrović was part of the Swiss side that won the under-17 World Cup in 2009, before going on to captain the under-18s.

At the start of 2013, Hajrović, after expressing a desire to play for Bosnia and Herzegovina, was invited by the Bosnian FA as a special guest for Bosnia's friendly against Slovenia. In May 2013, FIFA allowed Hajrović to switch national teams, after which he elected to play for Bosnia and Herzegovina internationally.

He made his debut for the Bosnian U-21 team on 31 May 2013, in a friendly match between Bosnia and Herzegovina U21 and Bosnia and Herzegovina.

== Personal life ==
His parents are Bosniaks from Bijelo Polje, Montenegro, but they relocated to Sarajevo in 1980. They moved to Switzerland in 1987. His older brother, Izet is also a footballer.

Hajrović is fluent in German, English and Bosnian.

== Career statistics ==
=== Club ===
As of match played 27 September 2024

Club	Season	League			National Cup (Note: Includes FA Cup, Swiss Cup)		League Cup (Note: Includes EFL Cup)		Continental		Other		Total	
Club	Season	Division	Apps	Goals	Apps	Goals	Apps	Goals	Apps	Goals	Apps	Goals	Apps	Goals
Barnet (loan)	2011-12	League Two	10	0	0	0	0	0	—		0	0	10	0
Arsenal	2012-13	Premier League	0	0	0	0	0	0	0	0	—		0	0
Grasshopper	2013-14	Swiss Super League	2	0	0	0	—		0	0	—		2	0
Winterthur	2014-15	Swiss Challenge League	33	0	1	0	—		—		—		34	0
Winterthur	2015-16	Swiss Challenge League	34	0	2	0	—		—		—		36	0
Winterthur	Total		67	0	3	0	0	0	0	0	0	0	70	0
Wohlen	2016-17	Swiss Challenge League	29	2	1	0	—		—		—		30	2
Wohlen	2017-18	Swiss Challenge League	29	1	0	0	—		—		—		29	1
Wohlen	Total		58	3	1	0	0	0	0	0	0	0	59	3
Winterthur	2018-19	Swiss Challenge League	32	2	2	0	—		—		—		34	2
Winterthur	2019-20	Swiss Challenge League	13	0	2	0	—		—		—		15	0
Winterthur	Total		45	2	4	0	0	0	0	0	0	0	49	2
Viktoria Köln	2019-20	3. Liga	14	0	—		—		—		—		14	0
Viktoria Köln	2020-21	3. Liga	20	0	—		—		—		—		20	0
Viktoria Köln	Total		34	0	0	0	0	0	0	0	0	0	34	0
Yverdon-Sport	2021-22	Swiss Challenge League	29	0	4	0	—		—		—		33	0
Yverdon-Sport	2022-23	Swiss Challenge League	28	0	1	0	—		—		—		29	0
Yverdon-Sport	Total		57	0	5	0	0	0	0	0	0	0	62	0
Xamax	2023-24	Swiss Challenge League	28	0	1	0	—		—		—		29	0
Xamax	2024-25	Swiss Challenge League	4	0	0	0	—		—		—		4	0
Xamax	Total		32	0	1	0	0	0	0	0	0	0	33	0
Career total			305	5	14	0	0	0	0	0	0	0	319	5
