= Alban Pnishi =

Swiss-Albanian footballer (born 1990)

Personal information
- Date of birth: 20 October 1990 (age 36)
- Place of birth: Zürich, Switzerland
- Height: 1.89 m (6 ft 2 in)
- Position: Centre-back

Team information
- Current team: Wohlen
- Number: 6

Youth career
- –2007: FC Bremgarten
- 2007–2009: Wohlen

Senior career*
Years	Team	Apps	(Gls)
2009–2015	Wohlen	149	(2)
2015–2018	Grasshoppers	57	(1)
2018–2019	Bnei Sakhnin	26	(0)
2019	Bnei Yehuda	10	(1)
2020–2021	Feronikeli	4	(0)
2021–	Wohlen	65	(4)

International career^{‡}
2015–2017	Kosovo	8	(0)
- * Club domestic league appearances and goals as of 4 May 2024 ‡ National team caps and goals as of 9 October 2017

Alban Pnishi (born 20 October 1990) is a professional footballer who plays as a centre-back for Swiss club Wohlen. Born in Switzerland, he represented Kosovo at international level.

== Club career ==
=== Bnei Sakhnin ===
On 9 July 2018, Pnishi signed a two-year contract with Israeli Premier League club Bnei Sakhnin. On 28 July 2018, he made his debut with Bnei Sakhnin in a Toto Cup match against Hapoel Hadera after being named in the starting line-up.

=== Bnei Yehuda Tel Aviv ===
On 6 August 2019, Pnishi signed a two-year contract with Israeli Premier League club Bnei Yehuda. Two days later, he made his debut with Bnei Yehuda in the third qualifying round of the 2019–20 UEFA Europa League against the Azerbaijani side Neftçi after being named in the starting line-up.

=== Feronikeli ===
On 19 August 2020, Pnishi joined Football Superleague of Kosovo side Feronikeli.

== International career ==
On 10 November 2015, Pnishi received a call-up from Kosovo for a friendly match against Albania and made his debut after coming on as a substitute in the 5th minute in place of the injured Ilir Berisha.

== Personal life ==
Pnishi was born in Zürich, Switzerland to Kosovo Albanian parents from Gjakova.

== Career statistics ==
=== Club ===
As of 3 November 2018

Club	Season	League			Cup		Continental		Other		Total	
Club	Season	Division	Apps	Goals	Apps	Goals	Apps	Goals	Apps	Goals	Apps	Goals
Wohlen	2009–10	Swiss Challenge League	14	0	0	0	—				14	0
Wohlen	2010–11	Swiss Challenge League	16	1	2	0	—				18	1
Wohlen	2011–12	Swiss Challenge League	28	0	2	0	—				30	0
Wohlen	2012–13	Swiss Challenge League	33	1	2	0	—				35	1
Wohlen	2013–14	Swiss Challenge League	29	0	2	0	—				31	0
Wohlen	2014–15	Swiss Challenge League	29	0	2	0	—				31	0
Wohlen	Total		149	2	10	0	—				159	2
Grasshoppers	2015–16	Swiss Super League	26	1	1	0	—				27	1
Grasshoppers	2016–17	Swiss Super League	24	0	0	0	6	0	—		30	0
Grasshoppers	2017–18	Swiss Super League	7	0	1	0	—				8	0
Grasshoppers	Total		57	1	2	0	6	0	—		65	1
Bnei Sakhnin	2018–19	Israeli Premier League	26	0	2	0	—		5 (Note: All appearance(s) in 2018–19 Israeli Premier League relegation round)	0	33	0
Bnei Yehuda	2019–20	Israeli Premier League	10	1	1	0	4	0	—		0	0
Bnei Yehuda	Total		36	1	3	0	4	0	5	0	0	0
Career total			242	4	15	0	10	0	5	0	272	4

=== International ===
As of 9 October 2017

National team	Year	Apps	Goals
Kosovo
Kosovo	2015	1	0
Kosovo	2016	4	0
Kosovo	2017	3	0
Total		8	0
