= Drilon =

Drilon is a given name and a surname. Notable people with that name include:

== People with the given name ==
- Drilon Cenaj (born 1997), Kosovan footballer
- Drilon Hajrizi (born 1991), Kosovan basketball player
- Drilon Ibrahimi (born 1988), Kosovan sports shooter
- Drilon Musaj (born 1994), Kosovan football player
- Drilon Paçarizi (born 1989), Albanian football player
- Drilon Shala (born 1987), Finnish football player

== People with the surname ==
- Ces Drilon (born 1961), Filipino television journalist
- Franklin Drilon (born 1945), Filipino politician
- Gabb Drilon (born 1984), Filipino actor

== See also ==
- Drilon National Park, Pogradec, Albania
- Drin River, formerly known as Drilon
