= Foschini =

Foschini is an Italian surname. Notable people with the surname include:

- Gerard J. Foschini (1940–2023), American telecommunications engineer
- Matthew Foschini (born 1990), Australian soccer player
- Michele Foschini (1711–c. 1770), Italian painter
- Sandro Foschini (born 1988), Swiss footballer
- Silvio Foschini (born 1963), Australian footballer

== See also ==
- TFG Limited, formerly known as The Foschini Group
