= Luís Pimenta =

Luís Pimenta may refer to:

- Luís Pimenta (football manager) (born 1981), Portuguese football manager
- Luís Pimenta (footballer, born 1986), Portuguese football forward
