= Marazzi =

Marazzi is a surname. Notable people with the surname include:

- David Marazzi (born 1984), Swiss football player
- Flavio Marazzi (born 1978), Swiss sailor
- Nicolas Marazzi (born 1981), Swiss football player
- Paul Marazzi (born 1975), British musician

== See also ==
- Pietra Marazzi, commune in Italy
- Carrozzeria Marazzi, Italian coach building company
- Marazzi design, manufacturing and distribution of ceramic tiles, Italy
