= 2008–09 FC Luzern season =

FC Luzern
- Chairman: Walter Stierli
- Manager: Ciriaco Sforza (until 10 August); Jean-Daniel Gross (caretaker, 11 August to 17 August); Roberto Morinini (from 18 August until 27 October); Rolf Fringer (from 28 October)
- Stadium: Stadion Allmend
- Swiss Super League: 9th
- Swiss Cup: Runners-up
- Top goalscorer: League: Joetex Asamoah Frimpong (13); All: Joetex Asamoah Frimpong (13)
- Average home league attendance: 8,074

The 2008–09 season was the 84th season in the history of Fussball-Club Luzern and the club's third consecutive season in the top flight of Swiss football.

== Pre-season and friendlies ==
Win Draw Loss

8 July 2008 2008 Uhrencup	Luzern (Switzerland)	1–1	(Poland) Legia Warsaw	Grenchen, Switzerland
20:15 CEST (UTC+2)	Ravasi 9'		Grzelak 72'	Stadium: Stadion Brühl; Attendance: 2,668; Referee: Sascha Kever

10 July 2008 2008 Uhrencup	Luzern (Switzerland)	2–2	(Germany) Borussia Dortmund	Grenchen, Switzerland
CEST (UTC+2)				Stadium: Stadion Brühl

16 July 2008 Friendly	Luzern (Switzerland)	1–2	(England) Liverpool	Grenchen, Switzerland
19:30 CEST (UTC+2)			Lucas 10'; Voronin 36'	Stadium: Stadion Brühl; Attendance: 9,500

== Competitions ==
=== Overall record ===
Competition	First match	Last match	Starting round	Final position	Record							
Competition	First match	Last match	Starting round	Final position	Pld	W	D	L	GF	GA	GD	Win %
Swiss Super League	20 July 2008	30 May 2009	Matchday 1	9th	36	9	8	19	45	62	−17	25.00
Relegation play-offs	10 June 2009	13 June 2009	First leg	Winners	2	1	0	1	5	1	+4	50.00
Swiss Cup	21 September 2008	13 April 2009	Round of 64	Semi-finals	5	4	0	1	14	4	+10	80.00
Total					43	14	8	21	64	67	−3	32.56

Source: Competitions

=== Swiss Super League ===
==== League table ====
Pos	Team	Pld	W	D	L	GF	GA	GD	Pts	Qualification or relegation
6	Bellinzona	36	11	10	15	44	51	−7	43	
7	Neuchâtel Xamax	36	10	10	16	50	57	−7	40	
8	Sion	36	9	10	17	44	60	−16	37	Qualification to Europa League play-off round (Note: Sion won the 2008–09 Swiss Cup and thereby qualified for the play-off round of the UEFA Europa League.)
9	Luzern (O)	36	9	8	19	45	62	−17	35	Qualification to relegation play-off
10	Vaduz (R)	36	5	7	24	28	85	−57	22	Relegation to Swiss Challenge League (Note: Being a Liechtenstein club, Vaduz are not eligible for qualification to European competitions via the Swiss league system. They did, however, qualify for the second qualifying round of the UEFA Europa League by winning their domestic 2008–09 Liechtenstein Cup.)

Source: axposuperleague.ch (in German)
Rules for classification: 1) points; 2) goal difference; 3) number of goals scored.
(O) Play-off winners; (R) Relegated

==== Results summary ====
Overall								Home						Away					
Pld	W	D	L	GF	GA	GD	Pts	W	D	L	GF	GA	GD	W	D	L	GF	GA	GD
36	9	8	19	45	62	−17	35	8	2	8	30	27	+3	1	6	11	15	35	−20

Source: Swiss Super League

==== Results by round ====
Round	1	2	3	4	5	6	7	8	9	10	11	12	13	14	15	16	17	18	19	20	21	22	23	24	25	26	27	28	29	30	31	32	33	34	35	36
Ground	H	A	H	A	A	H	A	H	A	A	H	A	H	H	A	H	A	H	A	H	A	H	H	A	H	A	H	A	H	A	H	A	A	H	A	H
Result	L	L	L	D	L	L	L	D	L	L	L	L	W	W	L	L	D	W	D	L	L	L	L	D	W	D	W	W	W	L	W	D	L	D	L	W
Position																																				

Source: Swiss Super League
A = Away; H = Home; W = Win; D = Draw; L = Loss

==== Matches ====
20 July 2008 Round 1	Luzern	1–2	Vaduz	Lucerne
16:00 CEST (UTC+2)				Stadium: Stadion Allmend

23 July 2008 Round 2	Zürich	1–0	Luzern	Zürich
19:45 CEST (UTC+2)				Stadium: Letzigrund

26 July 2008 Round 3	Luzern	0–1	Neuchâtel Xamax	Lucerne
17:45 CEST (UTC+2)				Stadium: Stadion Allmend

3 August 2008 Round 4	Bellinzona	2–2	Luzern	Bellinzona
16:00 CEST (UTC+2)				Stadium: Stadio Comunale Bellinzona

9 August 2008 Round 5	Aarau	1–0	Luzern	Aarau
17:45 CEST (UTC+2)				Stadium: Stadion Brügglifeld

17 August 2008 Round 6	Luzern	0–3	Young Boys	Lucerne
16:00 CEST (UTC+2)				Stadium: Stadion Allmend

23 August 2008 Round 7	Grasshopper	4–2	Luzern	Zürich
17:45 CEST (UTC+2)				Stadium: Letzigrund

30 August 2008 Round 8	Luzern	0–0	Sion	Lucerne
17:45 CEST (UTC+2)				Stadium: Stadion Allmend

13 September 2008 Round 9	Basel	2–0	Luzern	St. Jakob-Park, Basel
17:45	Huggel 16' (1:0); Chipperfield 84' (2:0)	Summary	(yellow card) 15' Diarra; (yellow card) 32' Seoane	Attendance: 20,627; Referee: (Switzerland) Cyril Zimmermann (Münsingen)

28 September 2008 Round 10	Vaduz	1–0	Luzern	Vaduz
16:00 CEST (UTC+2)				Stadium: Rheinpark Stadion

6 October 2008 Round 11	Luzern	0–3	Zürich	Lucerne
19:45 CEST (UTC+2)				Stadium: Stadion Allmend

25 October 2008 Round 12	Neuchâtel Xamax	1–0	Luzern	Neuchâtel
17:45 CEST (UTC+2)				Stadium: Stade de la Maladière

2 November 2008 Round 13	Luzern	1–0	Bellinzona	Lucerne
16:00 CET (UTC+1)				Stadium: Stadion Allmend

8 November 2008 Round 14	Luzern	3–0	Aarau	Lucerne
17:45 CET (UTC+1)				Stadium: Stadion Allmend

16 November 2008 Round 15	Young Boys	6–1	Luzern	Bern
16:00 CET (UTC+1)				Stadium: Stade de Suisse

29 November 2008 Round 16	Luzern	0–3	Grasshopper	Lucerne
17:45 CET (UTC+1)				Stadium: Stadion Allmend

14 December 2008 Round 18	Luzern	5–1	Basel	Stadion Allmend, Luzern
14:45	Frimpong 15' (1:0); Ferreira (yellow card) 19'; Frimpong 33' (2:1); Ferreira 40' (3:1); Paiva 70' (4:1); Paiva 74' (5:1)	Summary	(yellow card) 17' Marque; 32' (1:1) F. Frei; (yellow card) 55' Morganella	Attendance: 7,626; Referee: (Switzerland) Sascha Kever

8 February 2009 Round 19	Neuchâtel Xamax	3–3	Luzern	Neuchâtel
16:00 CEST (UTC+2)				Stadium: Stade de la Maladière

15 February 2009 Round 20	Luzern	2–3	Young Boys	Lucerne
16:00 CET (UTC+1)				Stadium: Stadion Allmend

18 February 2009 Round 17	Sion	1–1	Luzern	Sion
19:45 CET (UTC+1)				Stadium: Stade Tourbillon

22 February 2009 Round 21	Grasshopper	1–0	Luzern	Zürich
16:00 CET (UTC+1)				Stadium: Letzigrund

1 March 2009 Round 22	Luzern	1–2	Basel	Stadion Allmend Luzern
16:00	Paiva 33' (1:1); R. Schwegler (yellow card) 55'; Chiumiento (yellow card) 64'; Frimpong (yellow card) 68'	Summary	22' (0:1) Gjasula; (yellow card) 29' Stocker; (yellow card) 81' Streller; 90+2' (1:2) Chipperfield	Attendance: 10,154; Referee: (Switzerland) Sascha Kever

8 March 2009 Round 23	Luzern	1–3	Zürich	Lucerne
13:45 CET (UTC+1)				Stadium: Stadion Allmend

14 March 2009 Round 24	Aarau	0–0	Luzern	Aarau
17:45 CET (UTC+1)				Stadium: Stadion Brügglifeld

22 March 2009 Round 25	Luzern	4–2	Bellinzona	Lucerne
16:00 CET (UTC+1)				Stadium: Stadion Allmend

4 April 2009 Round 26	Sion	1–1	Luzern	Sion
17:45 CEST (UTC+2)				Stadium: Stade Tourbillon

9 April 2009 Round 27	Luzern	3–1	Vaduz	Lucerne
19:45 CEST (UTC+2)				Stadium: Stadion Allmend

18 April 2009 Round 28	Vaduz	1–2	Luzern	Vaduz
17:45 CEST (UTC+2)				Stadium: Rheinpark Stadion

22 April 2009 Round 29	Luzern	1–0	Sion	Lucerne
19:45 CEST (UTC+2)				Stadium: Stadion Allmend

25 April 2009 Round 30	Bellinzona	2–0	Luzern	Bellinzona
19:45 CEST (UTC+2)				Stadium: Stadio Comunale Bellinzona

2 May 2009 Round 31	Luzern	4–0	Aarau	Lucerne
19:45 CEST (UTC+2)				Stadium: Stadion Allmend

9 May 2009 Round 32	Zürich	1–1	Luzern	Zürich
17:45 CEST (UTC+2)				Stadium: Letzigrund

12 May 2009 Round 33	Basel	2–0	Luzern	St. Jakob-Park, Basel
19:45	Huggel (yellow card) 36'; Perović (yellow card) 42'; Zanni 59' (1:0); Perović 70' (2:0)	(Report)		Attendance: 19,051; Referee: (Switzerland) Nikolaj Hänni

17 May 2009 Round 34	Luzern	1–1	Grasshopper	Lucerne
16:00 CEST (UTC+2)				Stadium: Stadion Allmend

24 May 2009 Round 35	Young Boys	5–2	Luzern	Bern
16:15 CEST (UTC+2)				Stadium: Stade de Suisse

30 May 2009 Round 36	Luzern	2–1	Neuchâtel Xamax	Lucerne
17:45 CEST (UTC+2)				Stadium: Stadion Allmend

==== Relegation play-offs ====
10 June 2009 First leg	Lugano	1–0	Luzern	Lugano
20:15 CEST (UTC+2)	Renfer 15'			Stadium: Cornaredo Stadium; Attendance: 7,200; Referee: Claudio Circhetta

13 June 2009 Second leg	Luzern	5–0 (5–1 agg.)	Lugano	Lucerne
18:45 CEST (UTC+2)	Renggli 14'; Chiumiento 52' (pen.); Paiva 77', 83'; Scarione 80'			Stadium: Stadion Allmend; Attendance: 12,500; Referee: Cyril Zimmermann

=== Swiss Cup ===
21 September 2008 Round of 64	FC Plaffeien	0–3	Luzern	Plaffeien
15:00 CEST (UTC+2)

19 October 2008 Round of 32	FC Grenchen	0–3	Luzern	Grenchen
14:30 CEST (UTC+2)				Stadium: Stadion Brühl

10 December 2008 Round of 16	FC La Chaux-de-Fonds	0–4	Luzern	La Chaux-de-Fonds
19:30 CET (UTC+1)				Stadium: Stade de la Charrière

18 March 2009 Quarter-finals	FC Concordia Basel	0–2	Luzern	Basel
19:30 CET (UTC+1)				Stadium: Stadion Rankhof

13 April 2009 Semi-finals	Luzern	2–4	Sion	Lucerne
20:15 CEST (UTC+2)				Stadium: Stadion Allmend
