= Hajrović =

Hajrović is a surname. Notable people with the surname include:

- Izet Hajrović (born 1991), Swiss-born Bosnian footballer
- Sead Hajrović (born 1993), Bosnia and Herzegovina footballer
