= Gilberto Reis =

Cape Verdean footballer

Personal information
- Full name: Gilberto Reis Rocha
- Date of birth: 18 April 1986 (age 40)
- Place of birth: Coimbra, Portugal
- Height: 1.68 m (5 ft 6 in)
- Position: Right-back

Team information
- Current team: FC Echallens
- Number: 7

Senior career*
Years	Team	Apps	(Gls)
2002–2007	Lausanne-Sport	108	(4)
2007–2009	Yverdon-Sport	49	(0)
2009–2016	FC Le Mont		
2016–2018	Yverdon-Sport	45	(0)
2018–2020	Vevey United		
2020–	FC Echallens	33	(0)

International career
2008	Cape Verde	5	(0)
- * Club domestic league appearances and goals as of 1 July 2022

Gilberto Reis Rocha (born 18 April 1986) is a Cape Verdean footballer who plays as a right-back for FC Echallens. He made five appearances for the Cape Verde national team in 2008.

== Club career ==
Reis moved to Switzerland at a young age. He played five games for Lausanne-Sport before the club faced bankruptcy. Reis stayed with club at 2. Liga interregional and back to Challenge League in three seasons.

== International career ==
Reis received his first cap for Cape Verde national team at the friendly match against Luxembourg on 27 May 2008.
