= Florian Berisha =

Swiss football player (born 1990)

Personal information
- Date of birth: 18 January 1990 (age 36)
- Place of birth: Lugano, Switzerland
- Height: 1.70 m (5 ft 7 in)
- Position: Attacking midfielder

Team information
- Current team: Martigny-Sports

Youth career
- 2001–2007: FC Sion

Senior career*
Years	Team	Apps	(Gls)
2007–2012	FC Sion II	59	(16)
2008–2012	FC Sion	9	(1)
2009–2010	→ FC Schaffhausen (loan)	14	(3)
2009–2010	→ Yverdon-Sport (loan)	2	(0)
2012–2015	FC Aarau	3	(0)
2013–2014	→ FC Chiasso (loan)	30	(2)
2014–2015	→ FC Le Mont (loan)	35	(0)
2014–2016	Neuchâtel Xamax	14	(1)
2016	→ Servette (loan)	8	(3)
2016–2018	Servette	37	(6)
2018	→ Stade Nyonnais (loan)	2	(0)
2019	Yverdon Sport	13	(0)
2019–	Martigny-Sports	13	(7)

International career
2006	Switzerland U-16	7	(2)
2007	Switzerland U-17	11	(2)
2008	Switzerland U-18	5	(0)
2009	Switzerland U-19	7	(0)
2010	Switzerland U-20	3	(1)
- * Club domestic league appearances and goals as of 22:41, 14 November 2019 (UTC)

Florian Berisha (born 18 January 1990) is a Swiss football player, who plays as an attacking midfielder for FC Martigny-Sports.

== Career ==
On 15 February 2016, Berisha joined Servette FC on loan from Neuchâtel Xamax until the end of the season in 1. Liga Promotion. After the loan, he signed permanently with the club. On 15 February 2018, he was loaned out to Stade Nyonnais for the rest of the season, where he played 2 league games. He then returned to Servette FC, where his contract expired and he left the club.

Yverdon Sport announced on 7 January 2019 that they had signed Berisha for one year. Six months later, he moved to FC Martigny-Sports.
