= Davide Mariani =

Swiss footballer

Personal information
- Date of birth: 19 May 1991 (age 35)
- Place of birth: Zürich, Switzerland
- Height: 1.75 m (5 ft 9 in)
- Position: Midfielder

Team information
- Current team: Al-Ittifaq
- Number: 10

Youth career
- 2010–2012: Zürich

Senior career*
Years	Team	Apps	(Gls)
2012–2016	Zürich	31	(1)
2014–2016	→ Schaffhausen (loan)	62	(13)
2016–2018	Lugano	66	(13)
2018–2019	Levski Sofia	38	(15)
2019–2021	Shabab Al Ahli	12	(2)
2020–2021	→ Ittihad Kalba (loan)	24	(3)
2022	Beroe	13	(2)
2023	Schaffhausen	16	(2)
2024	Al Dhaid		
2025–	Al-Ittifaq		
- * Club domestic league appearances and goals as of 29 July 2025

Davide Mariani (born 19 May 1991) is a Swiss footballer who plays as a midfielder for Al-Ittifaq FC.

== Career ==
Born in Zürich, Mariani began his playing career at local club FC Zürich. He made his senior team debut in the Swiss Super League coming on as a substitute on 15 July 2012 in a 1–1 away draw against Luzern. On 9 December 2012, Mariani scored his first goal against Köniz in a match of the Swiss Cup.

== Career statistics ==
As of matches played 25 July 2020

Club	Season	League			Cup		Continental		Total	
Club	Season	Division	Apps	Goals	Apps	Goals	Apps	Goals	Apps	Goals
Zürich	2011–12	Super League	0	0	0	0	0	0	0	0
Zürich	2012–13	Super League	16	0	3	1	−		19	1
Zürich	2013–14	Super League	15	1	1	0	0	0	16	1
Zürich	Total		31	1	4	1	0	0	35	2
Schaffhausen	2014–15	Challenge League	33	12	1	0	−		34	12
Schaffhausen	2015–16	Challenge League	29	1	2	1	−		31	2
Schaffhausen	Total		62	13	3	1	0	0	65	14
Lugano	2016–17	Super League	34	8	1	0	−		35	8
Lugano	2017–18	Super League	32	5	3	0	6	1	41	6
Lugano	Total		66	13	4	0	6	1	76	14
Levski Sofia	2018–19	First League	35	11	1	0	2	0	38	11
Levski Sofia	2019–20	First League	3	4	0	0	3	2	6	6
Levski Sofia	Total		38	15	1	0	5	2	44	17
Shabab Al-Ahli	2019–20	Pro-League	12	2	6	0	0	0	18	2
Career total			209	44	18	2	11	3	238	49

== Honours ==
Zürich

- Swiss Cup: 2013–14
