= Stefan Iten =

Swiss footballer (born 1985)

Personal information
- Date of birth: 5 February 1985 (age 41)
- Place of birth: Zürich, Switzerland
- Height: 1.81 m (5 ft 11 1/2 in)
- Position: Defender

Youth career
- –2005: Grasshoppers

Senior career*
Years	Team	Apps	(Gls)
2005–2008	FC Wohlen	89	(3)
2008–2009	FC Vaduz	25	(0)
2009–2015	FC Winterthur	154	(4)
2015–2017	FC Uster	43	(0)

International career
- Switzerland U-17
Medal record
Men's football
Representing Switzerland
UEFA European Under-17 Championship
Winner	2002 Denmark
- * Club domestic league appearances and goals

Stefan Iten (born 5 February 1985) is a Swiss former football defender.

== International career ==
Iten is a former youth international and was in the Swiss U-17 squad that won the 2002 U-17 European Championships.

== Honours ==
- UEFA U-17 European Champion: 2002
