= 2015–16 Swiss Challenge League =

Swiss Challenge League
- Season: 2015–16
- Champions: Lausanne-Sport
- Promoted: Lausanne-Sport
- Top goalscorer: Jocelyn Roux (20 goals)
- Highest scoring: Lausanne-Sport 5–4 Biel-Bienne (18 July 2015)

The 2015-16 Swiss Challenge League, known for sponsorship reasons as the Brack.ch Challenge League, was the 13th season of the Swiss Challenge League, the second tier in the Swiss football pyramid. It began on 18 July 2015 and ended on 27 May 2016. After the 18th matchday the league will be on winter break between 7 December 2015 and 6 February 2016.

== Participating teams ==
2014–15 Swiss Challenge League champions FC Lugano were promoted to the 2015–16 Swiss Super League. They were replaced by FC Aarau, who were relegated after last place finish in the 2014–15 Swiss Super League. Last placed team of the 2014–15 Challenge League season FC Biel-Bienne were spared from relegation as Servette FC failed to obtain a license for the 2015–16 season and were relegated to the 1. Liga Promotion. Servette were replaced by 1. Liga Promotion champion Neuchâtel Xamax.

=== Stadia and locations ===
Locations of clubs in the 2015–16 Challenge League

Team	Venue	Capacity
FC Aarau	Stadion Brügglifeld	8,000
FC Biel-Bienne	Tissot Arena	5,200
FC Chiasso	Stadio Comunale	5,000
FC Lausanne-Sport	Pontaise	8,500
FC Le Mont	Stade Sous-Ville	4,000
Neuchâtel Xamax	Stade de la Maladière	12,000
FC Schaffhausen	Stadion Breite	4,200
FC Wil	IGP Arena	6,958
FC Winterthur	Schützenwiese	8,550
FC Wohlen	Stadion Niedermatten	3,624

=== Personnel and kits ===
Team	Manager	Kit manufacturer	Sponsor
FC Aarau	(Switzerland) Marco Schällibaum	Nike	Zehnder Group AG
FC Biel-Bienne	(Croatia) Zlatko Petričević	Nike	Fors
FC Chiasso	(Italy) Giancarlo Camolese	Primato	Caffè Chicco D'Oro
FC Lausanne-Sport	(Switzerland) Fabio Celestini	Adidas	BCV
FC Le Mont	(France) Claude Gross	Joma	AQUATIS
Neuchâtel Xamax	(Switzerland) Michel Decastel	Erima	Video2000; Viteos
FC Schaffhausen	(Italy) Maurizio Jacobacci	gpard	Ersparniskasse Schaffhausen; Methabau
FC Wil	(England) Kevin Cooper	Nike	Hans Eisenring
FC Winterthur	(Switzerland) Sven Christ	gpard	Keller
FC Wohlen	(Switzerland) Martin Rueda	Adidas	IBW

=== Managerial changes ===
Club	Name	Date of departure	Replacement	Date of appointment
Aarau	(Switzerland) Livio Bordoli	13 October 2015	(Switzerland) Marco Schällibaum	18 October 2015
Chiasso	(Switzerland) Marco Schällibaum	18 October 2015	(Italy) Giancarlo Camolese	20 October 2015
Neuchâtel Xamax	(Switzerland) Roberto Cattilaz	20 October 2015	(Switzerland) Michel Decastel	21 October 2015
Wil	(Turkey) Fuat Çapa	23 October 2015	(Switzerland) Philipp Dux (Interim)	23 October 2015
Wil	(Switzerland) Philipp Dux (Interim)	4 November 2015	(England) Kevin Cooper	4 November 2015
Winterthur	(Germany) Jürgen Seeberger	26 November 2015	(Switzerland) Dario Zuffi (interim)	26 November 2015
Winterthur	(Switzerland) Dario Zuffi (interim)	28 December 2015	(Switzerland) Sven Christ	28 December 2015
Biel-Bienne	(Switzerland) Patrick Rahmen	24 February	(Bulgaria) Petar Aleksandrov (interim)	25 February
Biel-Bienne	(Bulgaria) Petar Aleksandrov (interim)	29 March	(Croatia) Zlatko Petričević	29 March

== League table ==
Pos	Team	Pld	W	D	L	GF	GA	GD	Pts	Promotion or relegation
1	Lausanne-Sport (C, P)	34	19	8	7	61	39	+22	65	Promotion to 2016–17 Swiss Super League
2	Neuchâtel Xamax	34	15	9	10	53	42	+11	54	
3	Wil	34	14	11	9	60	49	+11	53	
4	Aarau	34	12	14	8	44	39	+5	50	
5	Schaffhausen	34	14	5	15	43	45	−2	47	
6	Winterthur	34	12	7	15	40	49	−9	43	
7	Chiasso	34	7	16	11	39	44	−5	37	
8	Wohlen	34	9	9	16	35	52	−17	36	
9	Le Mont	34	7	11	16	36	50	−14	32	
10	Biel-Bienne (Note: FC Biel-Bienne were deducted one point for licence violation. On 22 April Biel-Bienne were deducted four more points. On 27 April licence committee of the Swiss Football League stripped Biel-Bienne of their league licence. Results of Biel-Bienne's second half of the season were converted to 0-0 draws that award no points.) (R)	34	5	22	7	28	30	−2	16	Relegation to 2016–17 1. Liga Promotion

Source: Swiss Challenge League
Rules for classification: 1) points; 2) goal difference; 3) number of goals scored; 4) head-to-head points; 5) draw
(C) Champions; (P) Promoted; (R) Relegated

== Results ==
=== First and Second Round ===
Home \ Away	AAR	BB	CHI	LAS	LMT	NEU	SHA	WIL	WIN	WOH
Aarau		2–3	1–1	0–3	2–1	2–1	2–0	1–1	1–2	1–1
Biel-Bienne	3–1		1–1	0–3 (Note: Lausanne was awarded a 3–0 w/o win due to Biel-Bienne fielding more foreign players (5) than allowed (4). Match originally ended in a 3–2 win for Lausanne.)	3–3	2–2	2–0	0–0	5–1	0–3
Chiasso	1–1	0–0		1–2	2–2	2–1	3–0	2–2	1–3	1–1
Lausanne-Sport	1–1	5–4	1–2		1–1	2–3	1–0	3–0	0–2	2–0
Le Mont	0–0	1–1	1–1	1–3		2–1	2–0	1–0	1–0	3–0
Neuchâtel	2–0	1–4	0–0	1–0	1–0		1–0	1–3	1–0	1–1
Schaffhausen	1–0	2–0	2–0	0–4	2–0	2–1		4–1	1–2	1–1
Wil	0–0	2–0	4–1	3–3	3–1	3–2	3–2		0–0	1–3
Winterthur	1–1	1–0	3–1	0–1	2–2	2–0	0–2	1–2		0–0
Wohlen	0–0	2–0	0–3	1–2	2–2	0–2	2–1	1–3	3–2	

Source: Swiss Challenge League
Legend: Blue = home team win; Yellow = draw; Red = away team win.

=== Third and Fourth Round ===
Home \ Away	AAR	BB	CHI	LAS	LMT	NEU	SHA	WIL	WIN	WOH
Aarau		0–0	3–2	1–2	1–0	2–2	1–3	2–1	3–0	2–0
Biel-Bienne	0–0		0–0	0–0	0–0	0–0	0–0	0–0	0–0	0–0
Chiasso	1–2	0–0		1–1	2–0	2–1	1–1	1–1	1–2	1–0
Lausanne-Sport	1–1	0–0	0–0		2–1	1–1	0–1	2–1	1–4	1–0
Le Mont	1–1	0–0	0–0	0–2		2–4	0–1	1–1	2–0	2–0
Neuchâtel	0–0	0–0	2–1	3–1	1–0		1–1	4–2	2–0	4–0
Schaffhausen	1–3	0–0	3–1	0–2	4–1	0–0		1–3	2–2	4–1
Wil	3–3	0–0	1–1	2–3	3–0	3–1	3–0		2–1	1–1
Winterthur	0–2	0–0	0–0	2–2	2–1	0–3	1–0	1–2		1–4
Wohlen	0–1	0–0	2–1	1–3	2–1	2–2	0–1	1–0	0–2	

Source: Swiss Challenge League
Legend: Blue = home team win; Yellow = draw; Red = away team win.

== Season statistics ==
=== Top scorers ===
Rank	Player	Club	Goals
1	(Switzerland) Jocelyn Roux	Wil / Lausanne-Sport	20
2	(Switzerland) Antonio Marchesano	Biel-Bienne	13
2	(Switzerland) Charles-André Doudin	Neuchâtel Xamax	13
4	(Austria) Deniz Mujic	Schaffhausen	11
5	(Switzerland) Patrick Rossini	Aarau	10
5	(North Korea) Pak Kwang-ryong	Lausanne-Sport / Biel-Bienne	10

As of 27 May 2016

== Awards ==
Swiss Football League Awards 2015
Award	Winner	Club
Player of the Season	(Switzerland) Antonio Marchesano	FC Biel-Bienne

Brack.ch Challenge League Dream Team 2015
Position	Player	Club
Goalkeeper	(Switzerland) David von Ballmoos	FC Winterthur
Defender	(Switzerland) Numa Lavanchy	FC Le Mont
Defender	(Turkey) Egemen Korkmaz	FC Wil
Defender	(Switzerland) Arnaud Bühler	FC Wil
Defender	(North Macedonia) Ezgjan Alioski	FC Schaffhausen
Midfielder	(Switzerland) Alexandre Pasche	FC Lausanne-Sport
Midfielder	(Switzerland) Olivier Custodio	FC Lausanne-Sport
Midfielder	(Switzerland) Antonio Marchesano	FC Biel-Bienne
Midfielder	(Portugal) André Santos	FC Wohlen
Forward	(Switzerland) Jocelyn Roux	FC Lausanne-Sport
Forward	(Croatia) Igor Tadić	FC Schaffhausen
