= Ezgjan Alioski =

Macedonian footballer (born 1992)

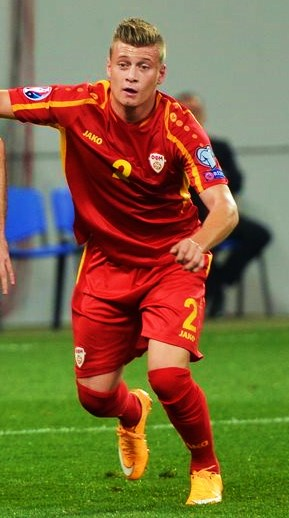
- Alioski playing for Macedonia in 2014

Personal information
- Full name: Ezgjan Alioski; Езѓан Алиоски
- Date of birth: 12 February 1992 (age 34)
- Place of birth: Prilep, Macedonia
- Height: 1.71 m (5 ft 7 in)
- Positions: Left-back; left wing-back; midfielder; right winger

Team information
- Current team: Lugano
- Number: 7

Youth career
- 2003–2010: Young Boys

Senior career*
Years	Team	Apps	(Gls)
2010–2013	Young Boys U23	57	(4)
2013–2016	Schaffhausen	77	(4)
2015–2016	→ Lugano (loan)	16	(3)
2016–2017	Lugano	34	(16)
2017–2021	Leeds United	161	(21)
2021–2025	Al-Ahli	32	(6)
2022–2023	→ Fenerbahçe (loan)	17	(1)
2025–	Lugano	23	(1)

International career^{‡}
2010–2011	Macedonia U19	6	(0)
2013–2014	Macedonia U21	10	(0)
2013–	North Macedonia	94	(13)
- * Club domestic league appearances and goals as of 28 September 2026 ‡ National team caps and goals as of 16 November 2026

Ezgjan Alioski (Albanian: Ezgjan Aliu; Macedonian: Езѓан Алиоски; born 12 February 1992) is a Macedonian professional footballer who plays as a defender or midfielder for Swiss Super League club Lugano and the North Macedonia national team.

He is commonly known as 'Gjanni'. A versatile left-footed player, Alioski can play as a striker, defensive midfielder, attacking midfielder, right winger, left wing-back or as a left-back. Alioski was dubbed by Leeds United supporters as their own “Duracell Bunny”, for his high level of pace and stamina.

== Club career ==
=== Early career ===
Having joined their youth academy in 2003, Alioski began his career as a left-back in the second team of Young Boys from 2010 to 2013, where he scored four goals in 57 matches. In January 2013, he went to Schaffhausen on loan, before joining on a permanent transfer in October 2013, scoring four goals in 77 matches.

=== Lugano ===
He joined Lugano on loan in January 2016, and made his debut on 13 February in a 2–1 loss against Thun. Despite signing him as a left back, then Lugano manager Zdeněk Zeman converted Alioski into an attacking right winger and striker towards the end of the 2015–16 season. He scored his first goal for the club on 11 May 2016 in a 4–0 win to Zürich.

In June 2016, his move was made permanent. New manager Andrea Manzo continued to play Alioski in the attacking roles once the season started. He scored his first goal of the campaign in his second game on 30 July 2016, in a 2–1 win over Young Boys. He scored seven goals in his first ten games at the club. On 9 April 2017, Alioski scored a hat-trick for Lugano in a 4–2 victory against Sion.

He continued to impress during his first season and helped guide Lugano to a third-place finish in the Swiss Super League. He scored 16 goals in 34 games for Lugano and was the third top goalscorer in the league in the 2016–17 season, behind Seydou Doumbia (20) and Guillaume Hoarau (18). He was also the third highest in the division in terms of his assists, after making 14 in his 34 games, behind Yoric Ravet (17) and Matteo Tosetti (15).

=== Leeds United ===
Alioski was a part of Leeds United's return to the Premier League in 2019–20 after a sixteen-year wait, notwithstanding three seasons played in the second tier of English football. He scored important goals in the 2019–20 season.

==== 2017–18 season ====
Alioski joined English club Leeds United on 13 July 2017. On 6 August 2017, he made his debut in a 3–2 victory against Bolton Wanderers and created the assist for teammate Chris Wood's goal. After gaining another assist, he received the man of the match award over Sunderland in a 2–0 win on 19 August.

On 26 August, Alioski received the man of the match award and scored his first goal for Leeds in a 2–0 victory against Nottingham Forest. On 15 September, Alioski won the Championship Goal of the Month Award for August for his goal against Nottingham Forest. In November 2017, Alioski scored in all of Leeds United's four games, and was awarded with the club's award for Player of the Month.

On 16 April 2018, Alioski was nominated as one of four players for Leeds United's Player of The Year award. On 21 April, Alioski scored the winner with his seventh goal of the season in a 2–1 victory for Leeds in the Yorkshire derby against Barnsley. He ended the season with seven goals and five assists. On 5 May, Alioski won the Goal of the Season award for his strike over Nottingham Forest at Leeds' annual award ceremony.

==== 2018–19 season ====
He scored his first goal of the 2018–19 season with a goal on 11 August in a 4–1 victory of Derby County.

Alioski started the season for Leeds as a winger playing on the right or left side, but after an injury to regular left-back Barry Douglas in 2019, Alioski was praised for his form playing at left-back, with his form keeping a returning Douglas out of the side. He continued to thrive in this wing-back position throughout 2019, producing marauding runs up the left flank and scoring against Stoke City, Bolton Wanderers and West Bromwich Albion to bring his Championship tally for 2018–19 to seven, until, on 22 April, in Leeds' 2–0 defeat at Brentford, Alioski was substituted after twelve minutes with a torn meniscus and missed the remainder of the season, including play-offs.

During the 2018–19 season, Alioski played 47 games in all competitions, netting seven goals, after Leeds finished the regular season in third place after dropping out of the automatic promotion places with three games left following a loss to Wigan Athletic on 19 April. Leeds United qualified for the play-offs versus sixth-placed Derby County, with Alioski's season already ended by injury. Leeds won the first leg of the play-offs in a 1–0 win at Pride Park to bring into a 1–0 aggregate lead into the home leg at Elland Road. However, they lost the second leg 2–4, with Gaetano Berardi being sent off. This setback resulted in Leeds losing 4–3 on aggregate.

==== 2019–20 season ====
On 24 August, Alioski scored his first goal of the 2019–20 season in a 3–0 win over Stoke City. After the English professional football season was paused in March 2020 due to the COVID-19 pandemic, the season was resumed during June, where Alioski earned promotion with Leeds to the Premier League and also become the EFL Championship winners for the 2019–20 season in July following a successful resumption of the season. Alioski played an important part in the promotion, scoring important goals and changing games.

==== 2020–21 season ====
Alioski played his first Premier League game on 19 September 2020, when he came on as a 70th-minute substitute for Patrick Bamford in the team's 4–3 home win over Fulham. Three days earlier, Alioski had been in the starting line-up, scoring the only goal — in added time — in Leeds's 1–1 League Cup second round tie with Hull City (Hull went on to win 9–8 on penalties with Alioski missing his spot kick).

He made his first Premier League start on 5 October 2020 against Manchester City, coming into the first eleven in place of Jack Harrison, who was ineligible to play against his parent club. On 16 December 2020, he scored his first Premier League goal in the 5–2 home win against Newcastle United. Alioski scored his final goal of 2020 in a 5–0 away win over West Bromwich Albion. Nearing the end of the 2020–21 season, Alioski was offered a new contract by Leeds, but he was unable to make an agreement to sign a new contract, thus ending Alioski's 4-year spell with Leeds.

=== Al-Ahli ===
On 29 July 2021, Alioski signed for Saudi Arabian club Al-Ahli.

==== Loan to Fenerbahçe ====
On 2 August 2022, he signed for Süper Lig club Fenerbahçe on loan for the remainder of the 2022–23 season. Alioski won the 2023 Turkish Cup with Fenerbahçe, beating İstanbul Başakşehir 2–0 in the final.

== International career ==
Eligible to represent Macedonia and Albania due to his Albanian heritage, Alioski decided to represent the country of his birth, Macedonia. After representing Macedonia at various youth levels, he made his debut for the senior side in 2013. He scored his first international goal against Albania on 5 September 2016 in a 2018 FIFA World Cup qualification match. He mainly played for his national side in a left wing-back position, before being converted to a more attacking midfield position.

On 6 September 2018, Alioski scored in a 2–0 win over Gibraltar in the UEFA Nations League. He scored in his country's next game on 9 September in a 2–0 UEFA Nations League win against Armenia.

In May 2021, Alioski was selected in the final 26-man squad to represent North Macedonia at the postponed UEFA Euro 2020, marking the country's first appearance at a major tournament. During North Macedonia's opening fixture of the tournament against Austria, immediately after striker Marko Arnautović (who is half-Serbian) scored, Arnautović angrily shouted towards Alioski and teammate Egzon Bejtulai–both of Albanian descent–what were believed to be anti-Albanian slurs. Football Federation of Macedonia released a statement calling for action by UEFA. On June 17, 2021, he scored a goal against Ukraine, a rebound goal off a saved penalty taken by Alioski.

== Personal life ==
Alioski is Muslim, and is of ethnic Albanian origin from Crnilište. He is a multilingual person who can speak Albanian, Croatian, English, French, German, Italian, Macedonian and Spanish fluently. He has citizenships of North Macedonia and Switzerland.

== Career statistics ==
=== Club ===
As of match played 3 May 2025

Appearances and goals by club, season and competition
Club	Season	League			National cup (Note: Includes Swiss Cup, FA Cup, King's Cup, Turkish Cup)		League cup (Note: Includes EFL Cup)		Continental		Total	
Club	Season	Division	Apps	Goals	Apps	Goals	Apps	Goals	Apps	Goals	Apps	Goals
Schaffhausen	2013–14	Swiss Challenge League	26	2	1	0	—		—		27	2
Schaffhausen	2014–15	Swiss Challenge League	35	2	1	0	—		—		36	2
Schaffhausen	2015–16	Swiss Challenge League	16	0	1	0	—		—		17	0
Schaffhausen	Total		77	4	3	0	—		—		80	4
Lugano	2015–16	Swiss Super League	16	3	2	0	—		—		18	3
Lugano	2016–17	Swiss Super League	34	16	1	0	—		—		35	16
Lugano	Total		50	19	3	0	—		—		53	19
Leeds United	2017–18	Championship	42	7	0	0	3	0	—		45	7
Leeds United	2018–19	Championship	44	7	1	0	2	0	—		47	7
Leeds United	2019–20	Championship	39	5	1	0	1	0	—		41	5
Leeds United	2020–21	Premier League	36	2	0	0	1	1	—		37	3
Leeds United	Total		161	21	2	0	7	1	—		170	22
Al-Ahli	2021–22	Saudi Pro League	28	6	2	0	—		—		30	6
Al-Ahli	2023–24	Saudi Pro League	4	0	0	0	—		—		4	0
Al-Ahli	2024–25	Saudi Pro League	—		—		—		6 (Note: Appearances in AFC Champions League Elite)	0	6	0
Al-Ahli	Total		32	6	2	0	—		6	0	40	6
Fenerbahçe (loan)	2022–23	Süper Lig	17	1	1	0	—		8 (Note: Appearances in UEFA Europa League)	0	26	1
Career total			337	51	11	0	7	1	14	0	369	52

=== International ===
As of match played 16 November 2026

Appearances and goals by national team and year
National team	Year	Apps	Goals
North Macedonia (Note: North Macedonia was known as Macedonia until 2019)
North Macedonia	2013	3	0
North Macedonia	2014	5	0
North Macedonia	2015	0	0
North Macedonia	2016	4	1
North Macedonia	2017	8	0
North Macedonia	2018	7	3
North Macedonia	2019	8	1
North Macedonia	2020	6	2
North Macedonia	2021	15	5
North Macedonia	2022	6	0
North Macedonia	2023	9	0
North Macedonia	2024	9	0
North Macedonia	2025	8	1
North Macedonia	2026	5	0
Total		94	13

As of match played 6 June 2025. North Macedonia score listed first, score column indicates score after each Alioski goal.

List of international goals scored by Ezgjan Alioski
No.	Date	Venue	Cap	Opponent	Score	Result	Competition
1	5 September 2016	Loro Boriçi Stadium, Shkodër, Albania	7	Albania	1–1	1–2	2018 FIFA World Cup qualification
2	6 September 2018	Victoria Stadium, Gibraltar	21	Gibraltar	2–0	2–0	2018–19 UEFA Nations League D
3	9 September 2018	Philip II Arena, Skopje, Macedonia	22	Armenia	1–0	2–0	2018–19 UEFA Nations League D
4	13 October 2018	Philip II Arena, Skopje, Macedonia	23	Liechtenstein	4–1	4–1	2018–19 UEFA Nations League D
5	21 March 2019	Philip II Arena, Skopje, Macedonia	26	Latvia	1–0	3–1	UEFA Euro 2020 qualifying
6	5 September 2020	Toše Proeski Arena, Skopje, North Macedonia	34	Armenia	1–0	2–1	2020–21 UEFA Nations League C
7	14 October 2020	Toše Proeski Arena, Skopje, North Macedonia	38	Georgia	1–1	1–1	2020–21 UEFA Nations League C
8	4 June 2021	Toše Proeski Arena, Skopje, North Macedonia	44	Kazakhstan	1–0	4–0	Friendly
9	17 June 2021	Arena Națională, Bucharest, Romania	46	Ukraine	1–2	1–2	UEFA Euro 2020
10	5 September 2021	Laugardalsvöllur, Reykjavík, Iceland	49	Iceland	2–0	2–2	2022 FIFA World Cup qualification
11	8 October 2021	Rheinpark Stadion, Vaduz, Liechtenstein	51	Liechtenstein	2–0	4–0	2022 FIFA World Cup qualification
12	14 November 2021	Toše Proeski Arena, Skopje, North Macedonia	54	Iceland	1–0	3–1	2022 FIFA World Cup qualification
13	6 June 2025	Toše Proeski Arena, Skopje, North Macedonia	84	Belgium	1–1	1–1	2026 FIFA World Cup qualification

== Honours ==
Leeds United

- EFL Championship: 2019–20

Fenerbahçe

- Turkish Cup: 2022–23

Al-Ahli

- AFC Champions League Elite: 2024–25

Individual

- Swiss Super League Team of the Year: 2016–17
- EFL Championship Goal of the Month: August 2017
- Leeds United Goal of the Season: 2017–18
