= Dylan Stadelmann =

Swiss footballer (born 1989)

Personal information
- Date of birth: 30 January 1989 (age 37)
- Place of birth: Delémont, Switzerland
- Height: 1.68 m (5 ft 6 in)
- Position: Wide midfielder

Youth career
- –2002: Jura Team
- 2002–2007: Lausanne-Sport

Senior career*
Years	Team	Apps	(Gls)
2007–2011	Lausanne-Sport	21	(1)
2007–2008	→ Malley (loan)	18	(0)
2010–2011	→ Yverdon-Sport (loan)	1	(0)
2011–2013	FC Stade Nyonnais	38	(0)
2013–2016	FC Wohlen	80	(1)
2016–2017	FC Wil	22	(0)
2017–2018	FC Wohlen	15	(0)
- * Club domestic league appearances and goals

Dylan Stadelmann (born 30 January 1989) is a retired Swiss professional footballer.

== Career ==
Dylan was born in Delémont, Switzerland, on 30 January 1989. He grew up with his brothers and parents in Moutier and played with the Jura Team until age 13. At this time, he joined the Lausanne-Sport training centre. He played there and joined the 1st team (currently in Super League, 1st division) at age 18. He played in the Europa League 2010–2011 and the Swiss cup final in 2010 against FC Basel. He also played with FC Malley, FC Stade-Nyonnais and Wohlen from June 2013 to December 2015 before joining FC Wil in January 2016.

Stadelmann retired in March 2018.
