= Mustafa Sejmenović =

Bosnian footballer (born 1986)

Personal information
- Date of birth: 3 January 1986 (age 40)
- Height: 1.85 m (6 ft 1 in)
- Position: Centre back

Team information
- Current team: FC Portalban/Gletterens
- Number: 5

Senior career*
Years	Team	Apps	(Gls)
2002–2011	Yverdon-Sport	216	(15)
2006	→ Baulmes (loan)	20	(0)
2012–2015	Biel-Bienne	88	(7)
2015–2019	Xamax	117	(7)
2019–2021	Yverdon-Sport	29	(7)
2021–	FC Portalban/Gletterens	6	(0)

International career
- Switzerland U-20
2007	Bosnia-Herzegovina U-21	1	(0)
- * Club domestic league appearances and goals as of 23 October 2021

Mustafa Sejmenović (born 3 January 1986) is a Swiss-born Bosnian football centre back who plays for Swiss club FC Portalban/Gletterens.

== Club career ==
He primarily played for hometown club Yverdon-Sport and for Neuchâtel Xamax. In May 2019 it was confirmed, that Sejmenović would return to Yverdon-Sport FC ahead of the 2019/20 season.
