= Gianluca D'Angelo =

Swiss-Italian footballer (born 1991)

Personal information
- Date of birth: 13 March 1991 (age 35)
- Place of birth: Zürich, Switzerland
- Height: 1.81 m (5 ft 11 in)
- Position: Defensive midfielder

Youth career
- 2001–2004: Schwamendingen
- 2004–2009: Grasshopper

Senior career*
Years	Team	Apps	(Gls)
2009–2012	Grasshopper	13	(0)
2011	→ Schaffhausen (loan)	10	(0)
2011–2012	→ Bellinzona (loan)	22	(0)
2012–2013	Bellinzona	30	(3)
2013–2017	Winterthur	92	(10)
2018–2021	FC Dietikon	17	(1)

International career^{‡}
2009–2010	Switzerland U19	11	(0)
2011–2012	Switzerland U20	3	(0)
- * Club domestic league appearances and goals as of 3 August 2019 ‡ National team caps and goals as of 14 May 2013

Gianluca D'Angelo (born 13 March 1991) is a Swiss professional footballer.

== Club career ==
D'Angelo began his playing career at FC Schwamendingen before moving on to Grasshopper where he rose through the youth ranks, playing regularly for the reserve team. He eventually made his Swiss Super League debut on 19 July 2009 against FC Sion, coming on as a substitute. During the second half of the 2010–11 season, he went on loan to Swiss Challenge League side FC Schaffhausen making his debut against FC Lugano on 4 April 2011. At the start of the 2011–12 season D'Angelo again went on loan to a second division club, this time AC Bellinzona. He made his debut on 23 July 2011 against SR Delémont.

== International career ==
D'Angelo is currently a Switzerland youth international having played at under-19 level. He was also named in a 50-man preliminary squad called up for the 2012 Summer Olympics in London but did not make the final team.
