= David Marazzi =

Swiss footballer (born 1984)

Personal information
- Full name: David Marazzi
- Date of birth: 6 September 1984 (age 42)
- Place of birth: Lausanne, Switzerland
- Height: 1.77 m (5 ft 9 1/2 in)
- Position: Left midfielder

Team information
- Current team: Yverdon Sport
- Number: 17

Senior career*
Years	Team	Apps	(Gls)
2001–2003	Lausanne Sport	28	(3)
2003–2008	FC St. Gallen	145	(12)
2008–2013	FC Aarau	119	(10)
2013–2014	Servette	23	(4)
2014–2016	Lausanne Sport	52	(4)
2016–2017	Le Mont	24	(0)
2017–	Yverdon Sport	7	(2)

International career
200?–2006	Switzerland U-21		
- * Club domestic league appearances and goals as of 10 September 2017

David Marazzi (born 6 September 1984) is a footballer from Switzerland who currently plays as midfielder for Yverdon Sport in the Swiss Promotion League.
