= Sandro Foschini =

Swiss football midfielder (born 1988)

Personal information
- Date of birth: 7 February 1988 (age 38)
- Place of birth: Switzerland
- Height: 1.80 m (5 ft 11 in)
- Position: Midfielder

Team information
- Current team: FC Wohlen
- Number: 33

Senior career*
| Years | Team | Apps | (Gls) |
| 2005–2006 | FC Frauenfeld | 26 | (2) |
| 2006–2008 | FC Luzern | 10 | (0) |
| 2008–2009 | FC Gossau | 28 | (2) |
| 2009–2012 | SC Kriens | 93 | (8) |
| 2012–2014 | FC Aarau | 53 | (8) |
| | FC Winterthur | 66 | (6) |
- * Club domestic league appearances and goals as of 21 July 2012

Sandro Foschini (born 7 February 1988) is a Swiss football midfielder, who finished his professional football career at FC Wohlen.

Currently Team Manager at Grasshopper Club Zurich
