= Norman Peyretti =

French footballer (born 1994)

Personal information
- Date of birth: 6 February 1994 (age 32)
- Place of birth: Nice, France
- Height: 1.82 m (6 ft 0 in)
- Position: Right midfielder

Team information
- Current team: Vevey-Sports
- Number: 10

Youth career
- Nice
- 2012–2013: Wydad AC

Senior career*
Years	Team	Apps	(Gls)
2013–2015	Biel-Bienne	53	(6)
2015–2017	Thun	47	(2)
2017–2019	Aarau	29	(1)
2019–2022	Yverdon	29	(7)
2021–2022	→ Bellinzona (loan)	20	(4)
2022–	Vevey-Sports	4	(0)
- * Club domestic league appearances and goals as of 1 October 2022

Norman Peyretti (born 6 February 1994) is a French footballer who plays as a midfielder for Swiss club Vevey-Sports.

== Club career ==
On 1 September 2021, he was loaned by Yverdon to Bellinzona.

On 9 August 2022, Peyretti signed with Vevey-Sports.
