= Francesco Gabriele (football manager) =

Italian football manager

Personal information
- Date of birth: 20 January 1977 (age 49)
- Height: 1.82 m (6 ft 0 in)

Team information
- Current team: Switzerland U20

Managerial career
- Years: Team
- 2003–2006: FC Wacker Grenchen
- 2008–2011: FC Aarau (youth)
- 2012: FC Baden
- 2012: AC Bellinzona
- 2013–2014: FC Thun (assistant)
- 2014: FC Lausanne-Sport
- 2014–2015: FC Wil 1900
- 2016–2017: FC Wohlen
- 2017–2018: Switzerland U19
- 2018: Switzerland U20

Francesco Gabriele (born 20 January 1977) is an Italian football manager.
