= Paulo Menezes (footballer) =

Brazilian footballer

Paulinho
Personal information
- Full name: Paulo Menezes
- Date of birth: 14 July 1982 (age 44)
- Place of birth: Brazil
- Height: 1.75 m (5 ft 9 in)
- Position: Right back

Senior career*
Years	Team	Apps	(Gls)
1999–2003	FC Baden	99	(15)
2004–2009	FC Aarau	154	(7)
2009–2012	Grasshopper	78	(2)
2012–2013	FC Lugano	13	(0)
2013–2015	FC Winterthur	44	(1)
2015–2022	FC Schaffhausen	118	(1)
- * Club domestic league appearances and goals

Paulo Menezes (born 14 July 1982), also known as Paulinho, is a former footballer from Brazil who played as right back.
