= Luís Pimenta (footballer, born 1986) =

Portuguese footballer

Personal information
- Full name: Luís Filipe Pimenta
- Date of birth: 6 March 1986 (age 40)
- Place of birth: Mealhada, Portugal
- Height: 1.75 m (5 ft 9 in)
- Position: Centre forward

Youth career
- 2000–2002: Lausanne-Sport

Senior career*
Years	Team	Apps	(Gls)
2002–2003	Lausanne-Sport	2	(0)
2003–2008	Young Boys	0	(0)
2005–2006	Young Boys II	15	(0)
2006–2008	→ União de Coimbra (loan)	24	(10)
2008	Biel-Bienne	8	(0)
2008–2009	Baulmes	9	(14)
2009–2010	Lausanne-Sport	28	(2)
2010–2011	Nyon	24	(10)
2011–2012	Lugano	21	(4)
2012–2013	Chiasso	27	(14)
2013–2014	Lausanne-Sport	4	(0)
2014	Beira-Mar	5	(0)
2014–2015	Biel-Bienne	27	(5)
2015–2017	Le Mont	48	(0)
2017–2020	FC Bavois	55	(14)
- * Club domestic league appearances and goals as of 14:05, 17 November 2020 (UTC)

Luís Filipe Pimenta (born 6 March 1986) is a Portuguese professional footballer.

== Career ==
Pimenta first started his footballing career at the academy of FC Lausanne-Sport. Early on in his time with the club he made two appearances as they were then in the second division during the 2002-03 season. However, following the bankruptcy of Lausanne-Sport the following season, Pimenta joined BSC Young Boys. After initially playing with the side's academy team, he would go on to feature for the reserves but a lack of goals kept him from maintaining a place in the squad. This prompted the player to seek more playing time elsewhere on loan, joining Portuguese club C.F. União de Coimbra then playing in the fourth-tier. Following a stay of a year and a half there, he returned to Switzerland and left Young Boys for FC Biel-Bienne where he remained for only six months. He then joined FC Baulmes of the third division where he managed an impressive 14 goals in nine matches which drew the attention of his former club FC Lausanne-Sport, now back in the Swiss Challenge League, transferring in the latter part of the 2008-09 season. The highlight of his time during his second stint with Lausanne came as helped the club in their run to the 2010 Swiss Cup final, along the way scoring in the quarter-finals against his former team BSC Young Boys, although they would go to lose to FC Basel in the end. Released at the end of the season, Pimenta would go on to claim a succession of one year contracts with several clubs including FC Stade Nyonnais, FC Lugano, and FC Chiasso. In the summer of 2013, the player rejoined FC Lausanne-Sport for a third time although as the club currently play in the Swiss Super League he will finally get his chance to feature in Switzerland's top division.

In the summer 2017, Pimenta joined FC Bavois.
