= Matthias Minder =

Swiss footballer (born 1993)

Personal information
- Date of birth: 3 February 1993 (age 33)
- Place of birth: Winterthur, Switzerland
- Height: 1.90 m (6 ft 3 in)
- Position: Goalkeeper

Youth career
- 2008–2011: Winterthur

Senior career*
Years	Team	Apps	(Gls)
2011–2017	Winterthur U21	56	(0)
2012–2018	Winterthur	73	(0)
2018–2020	Neuchâtel Xamax	5	(0)
2020–2021	Grasshoppers	0	(0)
- * Club domestic league appearances and goals as of 8 December 2018

Matthias Minder (born 3 February 1993) is a Swiss professional footballer who plays as a goalkeeper.

== Club career ==
A youth product of Winterthur, Minder transferred to Neuchâtel Xamax 1 May 2018. Minder made his professional debut with Xamax in a 3–1 Swiss Cup loss to Lugano on 31 October 2018.
