= Drilon Paçarizi =

Kosovo–born Swiss–Albanian footballer

Personal information
- Full name: Drilon Paçarizi
- Date of birth: 22 August 1989 (age 37)
- Place of birth: Dragobil, Malishevë, SFR Yugoslavia
- Height: 1.82 m (5 ft 11 1/2 in)
- Position: Left wing

Team information
- Current team: Meyrin
- Number: 10

Youth career
- FC Meyrin
- –2007: FC Servette

Senior career*
Years	Team	Apps	(Gls)
2008–2009	Meyrin	32	(9)
2009–2010	→ Étoile Carouge (loan)	20	(15)
2010–2011	Étoile Carouge	38	(26)
2012–2014	Locarno	71	(18)
2014–2015	Lugano	23	(6)
2015–2016	Le Mont LS	23	(2)
2016–	Meyrin		
- * Club domestic league appearances and goals

Drilon Paçarizi (born 22 August 1990 in Dragobil, Malishevë) is a Kosovo–born Swiss–Albanian footballer who plays for FC Meyrin in the 1. Liga Classic.
