= Matteo Tosetti =

Swiss footballer (born 1992)

Personal information
- Date of birth: 15 February 1992 (age 34)
- Place of birth: Losone, Switzerland
- Height: 1.77 m (5 ft 10 in)
- Position: Right winger

Team information
- Current team: Locarno

Youth career
- 2000–2005: Losone Sportiva
- 2005–2009: Locarno

Senior career*
Years	Team	Apps	(Gls)
2009–2010	Locarno	2	(0)
2010–2011	Young Boys II	32	(4)
2011–2014	Young Boys	6	(0)
2012	→ Wohlen (loan)	13	(0)
2012–2013	→ Wohlen (loan)	36	(1)
2013–2014	→ Lugano (loan)	34	(4)
2014–2016	Lugano	49	(4)
2016–2020	Thun	118	(9)
2020–2022	Sion	46	(2)
2022–2024	Bellinzona	65	(1)
2024–	Locarno	1	(0)

International career
2009	Switzerland U17	2	(0)
2010	Switzerland U19	1	(0)
2011–2012	Switzerland U20	8	(0)
2012	Switzerland U21	0	(0)
- * Club domestic league appearances and goals as of 28 May 2024

Matteo Tosetti (born 15 February 1992) is a Swiss professional footballer who plays for Locarno.

== Club career ==
Tosetti began his playing career with hometown club Losone Sportiva until a move to FC Locarno in 2005. There he rose through the youth ranks and eventually made his first team debut on 24 May 2009 against FC Gossau, coming on as a substitute in a 4–0 away win. He would go on to make one further appearance for the club until his transfer to BSC Young Boys in August 2010. Tosetti in the coming seasons featured prominently for the reserve team until making a breakthrough into the first team during the second half of the 2010–11 Swiss Super League. He made his debut for Young Boys on 13 March 2011 against FC St. Gallen and would make a further five appearances that term. During the second part of the 2011–12 season Tosetti would go on loan to second-tier side FC Wohlen, making his debut against SC Kriens on 21 March 2012 in a 3–0 victory. He continued his loan into the 2012–13 season and scored his first goal for Wohlen on 22 July 2012 in a 1–0 away win over FC Wil.

In July 2013, he joined FC Lugano on loan from BSC Young Boys. On 19 February 2014, he was then sold to Lugano.

== International career ==
Tosetti is of Italian descent. Tosetti is a Switzerland youth international, having previously competed at under-17 and under-19 level and currently under-20 level. In 2009, he was part of the Swiss under-17 team that won the 2009 FIFA U-17 World Cup beating the host nation Nigeria 1-0 in the final. Tosetti featured as a substitute in one match at the tournament, a win in the semi-final versus Colombia.

== Honours ==
- FIFA U-17 World Cup: 2009

Individual

- Swiss Super League Top assists provider: 2017–18
