= Patrick Bengondo =

Cameroonian footballer (born 1981)

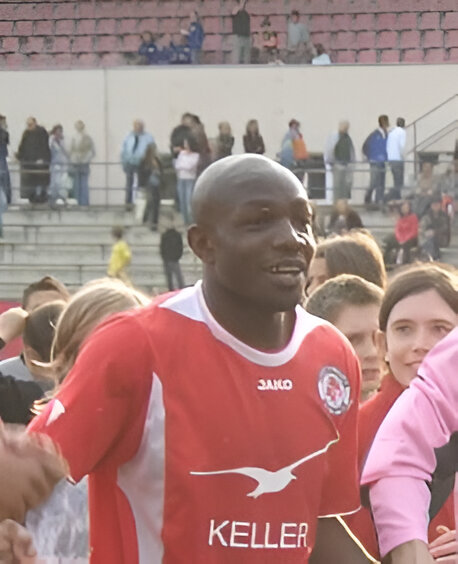
- Bengondo at the end of the 2006 season

Personal information
- Full name: Patrick Alphonse Bengondo
- Date of birth: 27 September 1981 (age 45)
- Place of birth: Akonolinga, Cameroon
- Height: 1.80 m (5 ft 11 in)
- Position: Forward

Youth career
- 1997–2000: Olympic Mvolyé

Senior career*
Years	Team	Apps	(Gls)
2000–2001	Olympic Mvolyé	20	(16)
2001–2002	Étoile Carouge FC	14	(2)
2002–2003	Bellinzona	26	(8)
2003–2004	Universitatea Craiova	5	(0)
2004–2005	GC Biaschesi	10	(3)
2005–2006	FC Winterthur	31	(18)
2006	FC Aarau	9	(0)
2007	Servette	17	(5)
2007–2008	FC Winterthur	25	(7)
2008–2011	FC Aarau	80	(18)
2011–2016	FC Winterthur	147	(50)
2016–2017	FC Le Mont	29	(5)
Total		413	(132)

International career
- Cameroon U23
- * Club domestic league appearances and goals

Patrick Alphonse Bengondo (born 27 September 1981) is a Cameroonian former professional footballer who played as a forward.

Bengondo began his career in his native Cameroon playing for Olympic Mvolyé. In 2000, he moved to Switzerland to play for Étoile Carouge FC where he played for the 2001–02 season before transferring to AC Bellinzona. Success there earned him a move to Romania to play for Universitatea Craiova. Injury limited his chances there and after only five appearances in the 2003–04 season he returned to Switzerland to play for GC Biaschesi for the 2004–05 season.

For the 2005–06 season Bengondo played in the second tier of Swiss football, the Swiss Challenge League, for Winterthur. A return of 18 goals in 31 games earned him a move to Super League side FC Aarau. Bengondo failed to settle in his first spell at Stadion Brugglifeld and soon moved to Geneva to play for the once-great Servette. For the 2007–08 season Bengondo was again on the move – this time to play at Winterthur. For the 2008–09 season Bengondo made a return to Brugglifeld to play for FC Aarau.

In June 2011, Bengondo went on trial with Scottish Premier League side Aberdeen. In Aberdeen's first pre-season friendly in advance of the 2011-12 season, which was against Scottish Second Division side Brechin City on 30 June 2011, he played as a trialist and scored Aberdeen's second goal in a 3–1 victory. Bengondo spent time on trial in July 2011 with Benevento Calcio in Italy and Hastings United in England. He eventually signed for Winterthur on 7 November 2011 and scored on his debut against Young Boys in the Swiss Cup on 27 November 2011.
