= Marco Köfler (footballer, born 1990) =

Austrian footballer

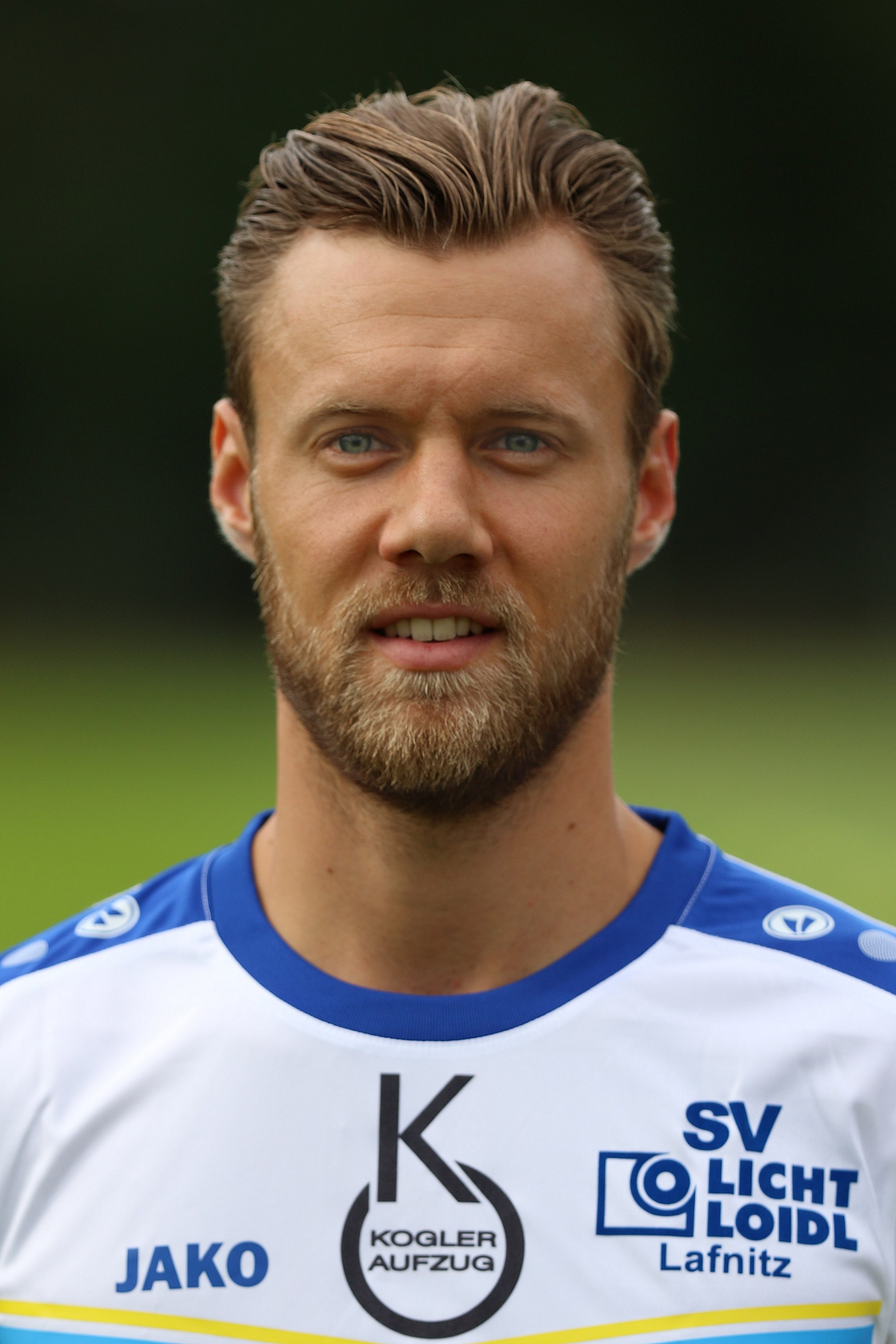

Personal information
- Full name: Marco Köfler
- Date of birth: 14 November 1990 (age 35)
- Place of birth: Mittersill, Austria
- Height: 1.83 m (6 ft 0 in)
- Position: Midfielder

Team information
- Current team: Gleisdorf 09
- Number: 15

Youth career
- 1998–2005: TSU Matrei
- 2005–2008: FC Waidhofen/Ybbs

Senior career*
Years	Team	Apps	(Gls)
2008–2009	FC Waidhofen/Ybbs	17	(0)
2011–2013	Wacker Innsbruck	12	(1)
2013–2014	Kapfenberg	32	(0)
2014–2016	Winterthur	43	(1)
2017–2019	SV Lafnitz	60	(1)
2019–2020	Deutschlandsberger	16	(2)
2020–	Gleisdorf 09	105	(13)
- * Club domestic league appearances and goals as of 20:03, 9 January 2025 (UTC)

Marco Köfler (born 14 November 1990) is an Austrian footballer who plays for Austrian Regionalliga club FC Gleisdorf 09. He previously played in the Austrian Bundesliga for Wacker Innsbruck and in the First League for Kapfenberg.
