= Igor Tadić =

Serbian footballer (born 1986)

Igor Tadic
Personal information
- Date of birth: 4 July 1986 (age 40)
- Place of birth: Loznica, SFR Yugoslavia (now Serbia)
- Height: 6 ft 1 in (1.85 m)
- Position: Striker

Senior career*
| Years | Team | Apps | (Gls) |
| 2005–2008 | Zug 94 | 87 | (36) |
| 2009–2012 | Kriens | 96 | (46) |
| 2012–2013 | St. Gallen | 8 | (0) |
| 2012–2013 | St. Gallen II | 12 | (12) |
| 2013–2014 | Servette | 29 | (11) |
| 2014–2016 | Schaffhausen | 58 | (30) |
| 2017–2018 | Wohlen | 50 | (16) |
| 2018–2019 | Vaduz | 30 | (8) |
| 2019–2021 | Kriens | 40 | (7) |
| 2021–2024 | Steinhausen | 0 | (0) |
| Total | | 410 | (166) |
- * Club domestic league appearances and goals as of 20 May 2021

Igor Tadić (born 4 July 1986) is a Serbian-born Swiss retired footballer who last played for SC Steinhausen.

Tadić joined Liechtenstein outfit FC Vaduz in summer 2018 from FC Wohlen, after spells at Schaffhausen, Servette Genève, FC St. Gallen, Kriens and Zug 94. After rejoining Kriens a year later, he moved on to become player/coach at Steinhausen in 2021.

== Honours ==
=== Individual ===
- Swiss Cup Top goalscorer: 2011–12
