= Jürgen Seeberger =

German footballer and manager

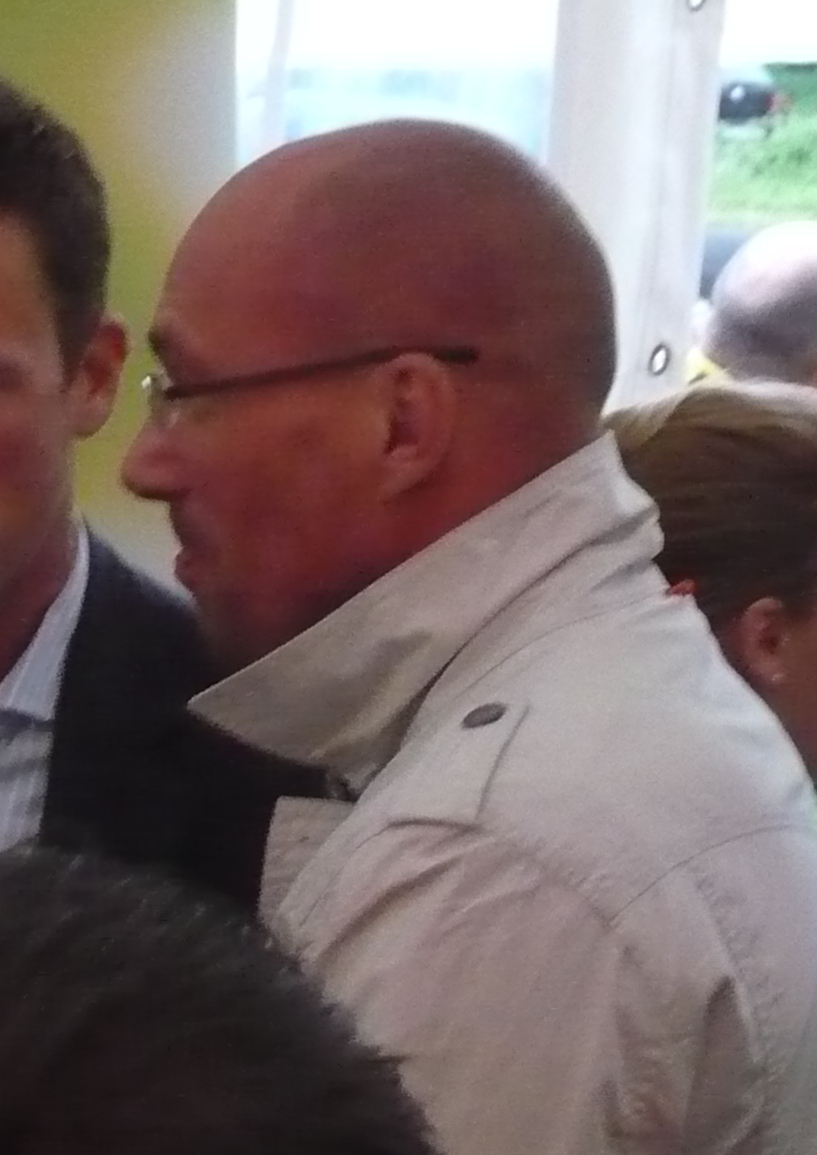
- Seeberger in 2012

Personal information
- Date of birth: 25 March 1965 (age 61)
- Place of birth: Konstanz, West Germany

Managerial career
- Years: Team
- 1994–1997: FC Schwamendingen-Zürich
- 1997–1999: Red Star Zürich
- 1999–2000: SC Kriens
- 2000–2007: FC Schaffhausen
- 2008–2009: Alemannia Aachen
- 2010–2011: VfB Stuttgart II
- 2012: Darmstadt 98
- 2014–2015: FC Winterthur
- 2016–2018: FC Kosova Zürich
- 2018: Stuttgarter Kickers
- 2019: FC Schaffhausen
- 2021–2022: FC Freienbach
- 2022–2023: FC Vaduz

Jürgen Seeberger (born 25 March 1965) is a German football manager, who was most recently the coach of Liechtensteiner club FC Vaduz.

== Coaching career ==
Seeberger was born in Konstanz. He started his managerial career at FC Schaffhausen in Switzerland in 2000 and coached the club until 2007, when he was let go due to bad results. Since January 2008 he has coached German side Alemannia Aachen and was released in September 2009.

On 28 January 2010, Seeberger became manager of VfB Stuttgart II.

On 5 September 2012, he took up the coaching position at Darmstadt 98, taking over from Kosta Runjaic who had resigned two days earlier to join MSV Duisburg. He was sacked just three months later.

On 9 April 2018, he succeeded Paco Vaz as manager of Stuttgarter Kickers in the Regionalliga Südwest.

On 27 February 2019, Seeberger was appointed as the manager of FC Schaffhausen. In June 2019, the club was sold to Roland Klein who confirmed, that Seeberger no longer would be the manager of the club because he wanted a person that he knew.

On 18 July 2021, Seeberger was appointed as manager of FC Freienbach.

On 15 December 2022, he was appointed as the new coach of FC Vaduz. The Liechtensteiner club plays in the Swiss Challenge League, the second tier of Swiss football. On 21 February 2023, he was sacked after a run of two draws and two losses in the league.
