= João Paiva =

Portuguese footballer

Personal information
- Full name: João Pedro de Lemos Paiva
- Date of birth: 8 February 1983 (age 43)
- Place of birth: Lisbon, Portugal
- Height: 1.73 m (5 ft 8 in)
- Position: Striker

Youth career
- 1993–1995: Olivais Moscavide
- 1995–2001: Sporting CP

Senior career*
Years	Team	Apps	(Gls)
2001–2003	Sporting B	50	(20)
2003–2004	Marítimo B	28	(6)
2004–2005	Espinho	9	(1)
2005–2007	Apollon Limassol	54	(16)
2008	AEK Larnaca	12	(2)
2008–2011	Luzern	72	(23)
2011–2013	Grasshoppers	25	(3)
2013–2014	Wohlen	34	(16)
2014–2016	Winterthur	63	(20)
2016	United Zürich	10	(2)
2017–2018	Dietikon	7	(4)

International career
2001–2002	Portugal U19	10	(0)
2003–2004	Portugal U20	9	(4)

Managerial career
- 2018–2021: FC Dietikon
- 2021: Bellinzona
Medal record
Men's football
Representing Portugal
UEFA European Under-17 Championship
Winner	2000 Israel
- * Club domestic league appearances and goals

João Pedro de Lemos Paiva (born 8 February 1983) is a Portuguese football coach and a former striker.

He spent the vast majority of his professional career in Switzerland.

== Club career ==
Born in Lisbon, Paiva played almost exclusively lower league football in his country: having been under contract with both Sporting Clube de Portugal and Marítimo, he only appeared for both clubs' reserve sides. In the 2004–05 season he competed with Espinho in the second division, but featured in less than one third of the league games and his team was also relegated after ranking 18th and last.

Paiva then spent three years in Cyprus, with Apollon Limassol and AEK Larnaca (half a season with the latter). For 2008–09 he joined Luzern in Switzerland, scoring eleven goals in 23 matches in his first year as the side finished ninth in the Super League, only barely avoiding relegation.

In January 2011, Paiva agreed to a contract with another club in the country, Grasshoppers, effective as of July.

== Coaching career ==
Paiva was hired as the manager of Swiss club Bellinzona in July 2021. He left Bellinzona on 23 August 2021 by mutual consent due to "diverging technical views", with Bellinzona winning 2 out of 3 games under his management.
