= Stade Sous-Ville =

Football stadium in Baulmes, Switzerland

Coordinates: 46.7877°N 6.5250°E

Stade Sous-Ville is a football stadium in Baulmes, Switzerland. It is the home ground of FC Baulmes and has a capacity of 2,500. The stadium has 500 seats and 2,000 standing places.
