= Stadion Schützenwiese =

Football stadium in Winterthur, Switzerland

Schützenwiese
- Schützi
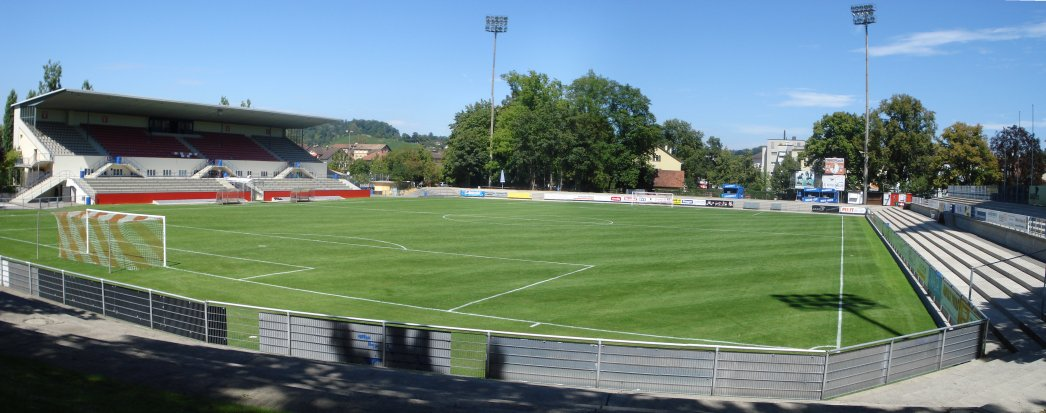
- Interactive map of Schützenwiese
- Location: Winterthur, Switzerland
- Coordinates: 47°30′03″N 8°43′03″E
- Operator: City of Winterthur
- Capacity: 8,550
- Field size: 105 m × 68 m (344 ft × 223 ft)

Construction
- Built: 1896
- Renovated: 1968, 2012-2013, 2015
- Expanded: 1922, 1957

Tenant
- FC Winterthur

Stadion Schützenwiese is a football stadium in Winterthur, Switzerland. It has been the home ground of FC Winterthur since the club's inception in 1896. It has a capacity of 8,550, more specifically 1,100 covered seats, 800 uncovered seats and 6,650 standing places.

The field received its first, wooden stands in 1922 on the western side, which were completely replaced in 1957/58 to contain changing rooms, a kiosk, and underground gyms. In 1968 the stadium received funding to build floodlights.

To match the Swiss Football League's license requirements introduced in the 2012/13 season, the stadium was modernized in three stages. The first stage contained improvements to the lighting, security, and catering systems, completed by 2013. This was followed by a rebuild of the eastern standing terrace in 2015, and finally a renovation of the main stands.

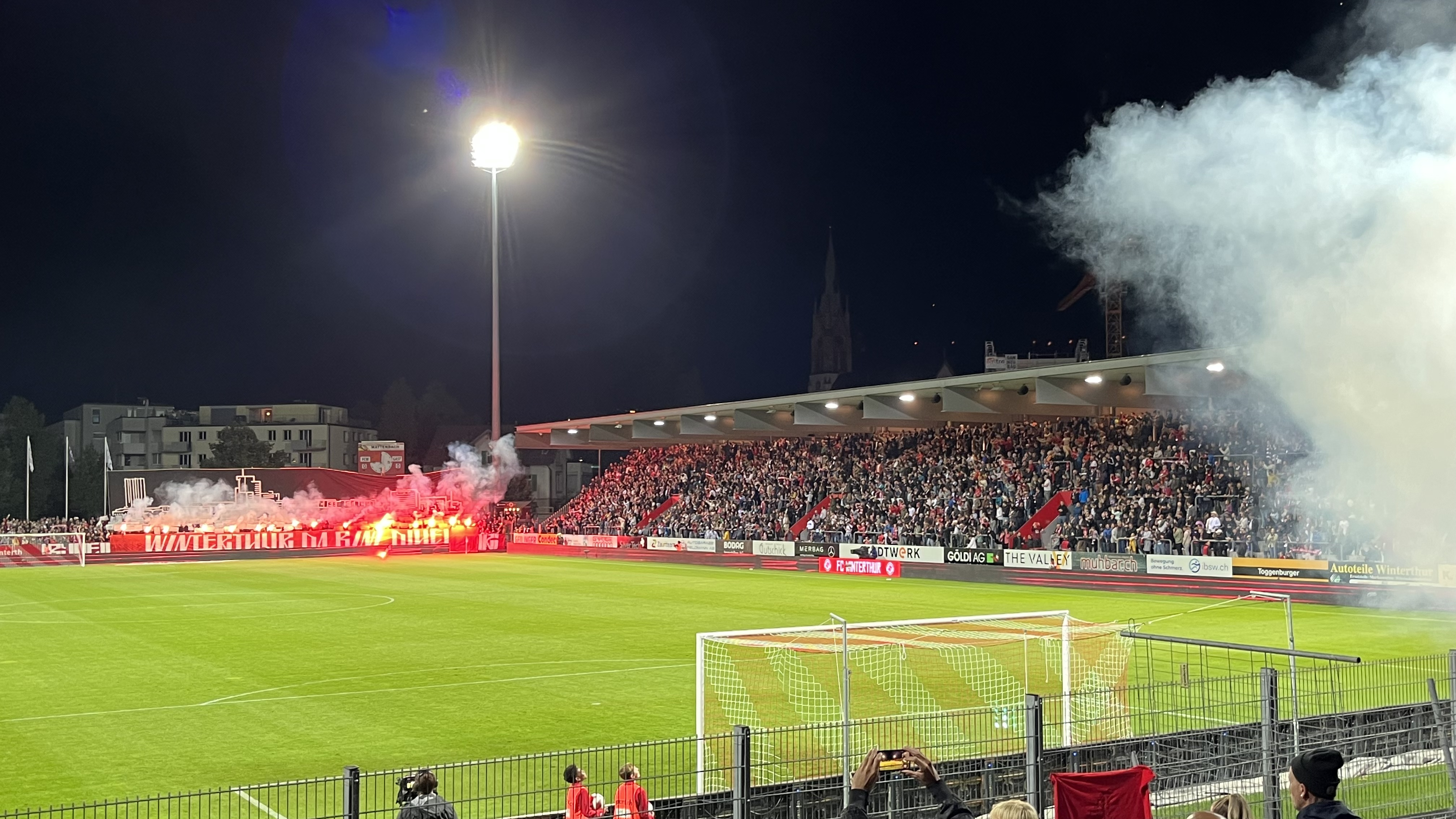
Stadion Schützenwiese in 2022

== See also ==
- List of football stadiums in Switzerland
