= FC Le Mont =

Swiss football club

- Full name: Football-Club Le Mont-sur-Lausanne
- Founded: 1942; 84 years ago
- Ground: Centre Sportif du Châtaignier
- Capacity: 1,300
- Chairman: Jean-Luc Laedermann
- Manager: Riccardo Berti
- League: 3. Liga (Switzerland)
- 2024–25: ACVF Group 4, 5th of 12
Home colours	Away colours

Football-Club Le Mont-sur-Lausanne, commonly known as FC Le Mont LS, is a Swiss football club based in Le Mont-sur-Lausanne, canton of Vaud. The club currently play in 3. Liga, the seventh tier of Swiss football.

== History ==
Football Club Le Mont was established on 1 July 1942.

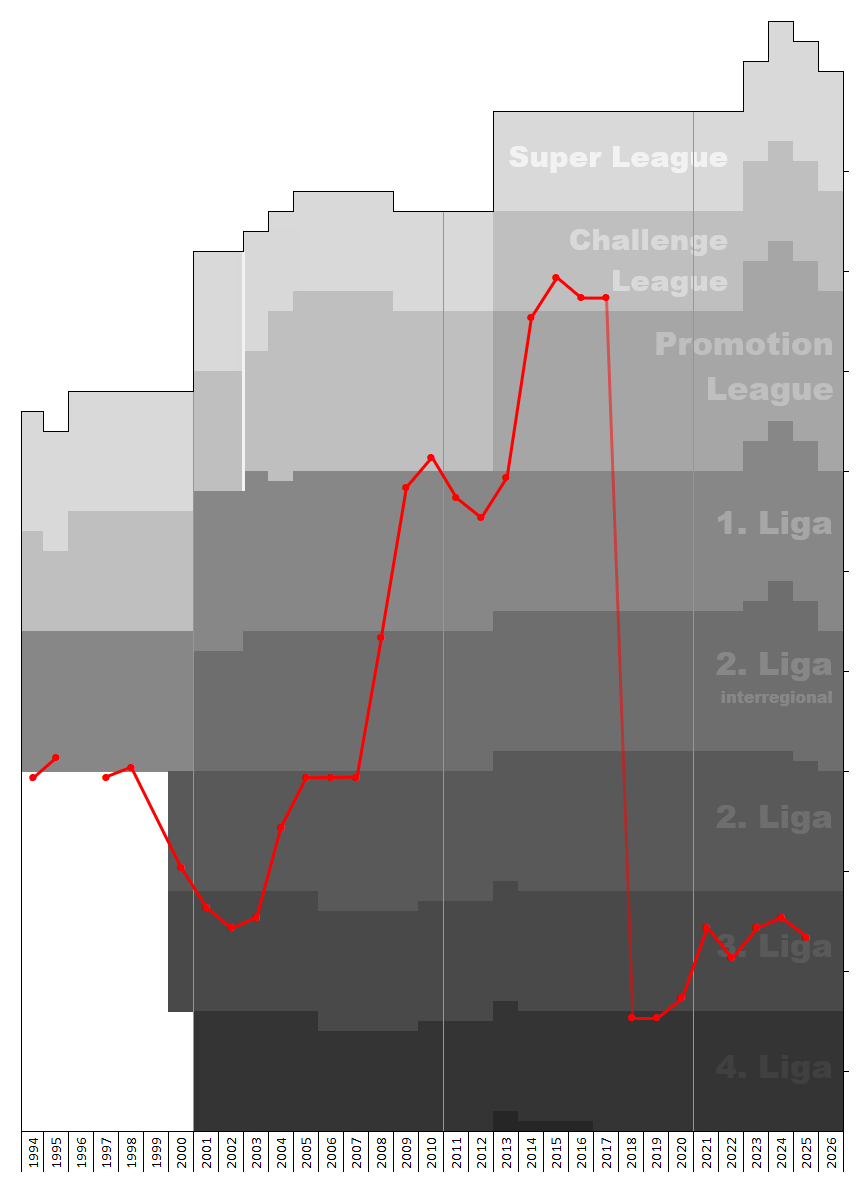
Chart of FC Le Mont table positions in the Swiss football league system

== Notable coaches ==
- Serge Duperret
- Diego Sessolo
- Raphael Tagan

== Honours ==
- 2008/09: 1. Liga Group 1 Champion
- 2012/13: 1. Liga Classic Group 1 Champion
- 2013/14: 1. Liga Promotion Champion

== Current squad ==
As of 31 August 2025

Note: Flags indicate national team as defined under FIFA eligibility rules; some limited exceptions apply. Players may hold more than one non-FIFA nationality.

No.	Pos.	Nation	Player
2	DF	SUI	Benjamin Chapuis
3		SUI	Mark Waldmann
4	DF	SUI	Carlos de Mestral Vargas
5	DF	ITA	Matteo Berti (captain)
6		SUI	Bijan Filippini
7		SUI	Gentrit Mulaku
8	DF	SUI	Esteban Ortega
9	MF	SUI	Nathan Jeckelmann
10	MF	SUI	Yolan Pittet
11	FW	SUI	José Pedro Machado Magalhães
11	DF	SUI	Antoine Vigand

No.	Pos.	Nation	Player
12	FW	SUI	Alex Joel Da Silva
13		SUI	Axel Villavicencio
14	FW	SUI	Ammar Al Maleki
15	DF	SUI	Mirnes Islamagic
16	FW	SUI	Faber Bickerstaffe
17	DF	SUI	Timothée Kunz
20		SUI	Cristian Beleza
21	MF	SUI	Elienay De Souza
22		SUI	Diego Batista
23		SUI	Matteo Mellioret
33	GK	SUI	Raphaël Ulm
