= FC Wohlen =

Swiss football club

- Full name: Fussballclub Wohlen 1904
- Founded: 1904; 122 years ago
- Ground: Stadion Niedermatten, Wohlen
- Capacity: 5,000 (634 seated)
- Chairman: Marcel Amrein; Jürgen Frömberg
- Manager: Piu Nascimento
- League: 1. Liga Classic
- 2024–25: Group 2, 11th of 16

FC Wohlen is a Swiss football club based in the town Wohlen in Canton Aargau. They currently play in the 1. Liga Classic, the fourth tier of Swiss football.

The club was founded in May 1904 and holds the honour of being the oldest football club in Switzerland that is not in a city. From 1930 to 1932 the team played in the Swiss Super League, the highest league in Switzerland, but mostly it has played in the 2nd or 3rd tiers. The greatest success of their recent history was their promotion to the Challenge League in 2002. In the autumn of 2004 they moved into their new stadium, Stadion Niedermatten.

The most famous former player is Ciriaco Sforza.

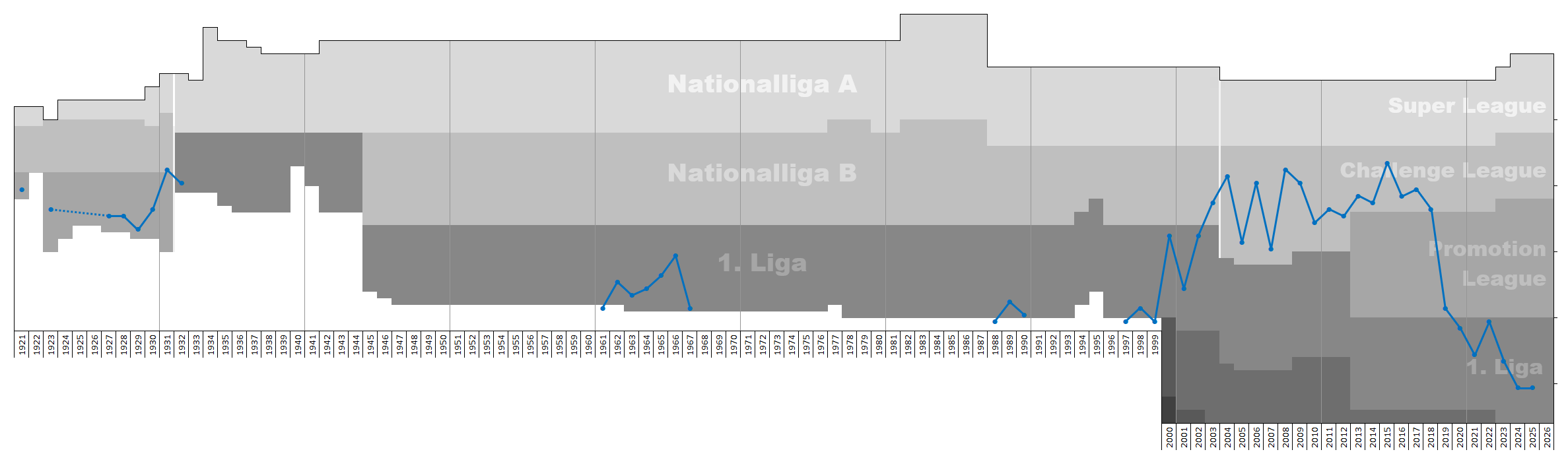
Chart of FC Wohlen table positions in the Swiss football league system

== Current squad ==
As of 6 March, 2026

Note: Flags indicate national team as defined under FIFA eligibility rules; some limited exceptions apply. Players may hold more than one non-FIFA nationality.

No.	Pos.	Nation	Player
1	GK	SUI	Joël Bonorand
2	DF	SUI	Berdan Senyurt
3	DF	KOS	Pren Gjini
5	MF	MKD	Milot Sinani
6	DF	KOS	Alban Pnishi
7	FW	TUR	Kaan Yilmaz
8	MF	SUI	Bijan Dalvand
9	FW	FRA	Dramane Sissoko
10	MF	ITA	Noel Romano
12	FW	SUI	Javi Gabathuler
13	DF	SUI	Gianluca Calbucci
14	MF	SUI	Marlon Rizzo

No.	Pos.	Nation	Player
15	MF	SUI	Luca Soares Nascimento
16	MF	SUI	Stefano Cirelli
17	FW	SRB	Djordje Komatovic
18	GK	SUI	Nico Ammann
19	DF	SUI	Santiago Brunner
20	DF	SUI	Sian Dzelili
21	MF	SUI	Edison Golaj
22	DF	SUI	Noah Jappert
24	MF	SUI	Nicola Peter
25	FW	SUI	Nicola Assaiante
26	FW	CRO	Djellon Shahini
27	MF	SUI	Michael Weber

== Stadium ==
The stadium is located in an area of Wohlen known as the "low mats". The stadium is owned by the Wohlen Council.

The total capacity is 3,734. Of these, 634 seats and 3100 standing.

The stadium is part of the a sports complex which includes, in addition to the football stadium, an athletics facility with 400-meter circular track, an inline skating space, two all-weather football pitches and nine tennis courts. The construction work began in autumn 2002 and was completed in spring 2004.
