= 2022–23 FC Winterthur season =

FC Winterthur
2022–23 season
- Chairman: Mike Keller
- Manager: Bruno Berner
- Stadium: Stadion Schützenwiese
- Swiss Super League: 9th
- Swiss Cup: Round 3

The 2022–23 season was the 127th season in the history of FC Winterthur and their first season back in the top flight. The club participated in Swiss Super League and the Swiss Cup. The season covered the period from 1 July 2022 to 30 June 2023.

== Players ==
=== First-team squad ===
Note: Flags indicate national team as defined under FIFA eligibility rules; some limited exceptions apply. Players may hold more than one non-FIFA nationality.

No.	Pos.	Nation	Player
1	GK	COD	Timothy Fayulu (on loan from Sion)
3	DF	SUI	Tobias Schättin
4	DF	KOS	Granit Lekaj (captain)
5	DF	SUI	Roy Gelmi
8	MF	SRB	Samir Ramizi
9	FW	SUI	Roman Buess
10	MF	SUI	Matteo Di Giusto
11	FW	SUI	Neftali Manzambi
14	MF	SUI	Thibault Corbaz
15	DF	SUI	Michael Gonçalves
16	MF	SUI	Remo Arnold
17	FW	SUI	Samuel Ballet
18	DF	CIV	Souleymane Diaby

No.	Pos.	Nation	Player
19	DF	SUI	Adrian Gantenbein
20	MF	SUI	Carmine Chiappetta (on loan from Basel)
21	MF	SUI	Kevin Costinha
25	DF	SUI	Yannick Schmid
27	GK	SUI	Armin Abaz
30	GK	AUT	Markus Kuster
35	MF	SUI	Arlind Dakaj
36	GK	KOS	Jozef Pukaj
40	MF	KOS	Hekuran Kryeziu
42	MF	TUN	Sayfallah Ltaief (on loan from Basel)
44	MF	SUI	Francisco Rodríguez
77	MF	KOS	Eris Abedini
99	FW	SUI	Nishan Burkart (on loan from Freiburg)

=== Out on loan ===
Note: Flags indicate national team as defined under FIFA eligibility rules; some limited exceptions apply. Players may hold more than one non-FIFA nationality.

No. / Pos. / Nation / Player; — / DF / SUI / Marin Cavar (at Brühl until 30 June 2023)	No. / Pos. / Nation / Player; — / DF / SUI / Pascal Hammer (at Biel-Bienne until 30 June 2023)

== Pre-season and friendlies ==
Win Draw Loss

17 June 2022 Friendly	Luzern (Switzerland)	2–1	(Switzerland) Winterthur	Eich, Switzerland
18:45 CEST (UTC+2)				Stadium: Sportplatz Brand

2 July 2022 Friendly	Winterthur (Switzerland)	3–0	(Switzerland) Schaffhausen	Winterthur, Switzerland
11:00 CEST (UTC+2)				Stadium: Stadion Schützenwiese

8 July 2022 Friendly	Rheindorf Altach (Austria)	1–1	(Switzerland) Winterthur	Altach, Austria
18:00 CEST (UTC+2)				Stadium: Stadion Schnabelholz

12 July 2022 Friendly	Winterthur (Switzerland)	3–0	(Switzerland) Brühl	Bern, Switzerland
19:00 CEST (UTC+2)				Stadium: Stadion Wankdorf

21 September 2022 Friendly	Karlsruher SC (Germany)	4–0	(Switzerland) Winterthur	Germany
13:00 CEST (UTC+2)		Report

4 January 2023 Friendly	Winterthur (Switzerland)	1–0	(Spain) Málaga	Coín, Spain
12:00 CET (UTC+1)	79'	Report		Stadium: Estadio José Burgos Quintana

5 January 2023 Friendly	Winterthur (Switzerland)	0–2	(Spain) Linense	Sotogrande, Spain
16:00 CET (UTC+1)		Report		Stadium: Santa Maria Polo Cancha 1

8 January 2023 Friendly	Winterthur (Switzerland)	5–1	(Germany) SC Freiburg II	Spain
11:00 CET (UTC+1)		Report

14 January 2023 Friendly	Winterthur (Switzerland)	6–0	(Austria) Dornbirn	Winterthur, Switzerland
14:30 CET (UTC+1)		Report		Stadium: Fussballplatz Flüeli

17 January 2023 Friendly	Rapperswil-Jona (Switzerland)	0–2	(Switzerland) Winterthur	Rapperswil-Jona, Switzerland
16:30 CET (UTC+1)		Report		Stadium: Stadion Grünfeld

25 January 2023 Friendly	Winterthur (Switzerland)	2–1	(Estonia) Flora	Winterthur, Switzerland
14:30 CET (UTC+1)		Report		Stadium: Fussballplatz Flüeli

22 March 2023 Friendly	Winterthur (Switzerland)	Cancelled	(Germany) Karlsruher SC	Winterthur, Switzerland
13:00 CET (UTC+1)		Report		Stadium: Stadion Schützenwiese

== Competitions ==
=== Overall record ===
Competition	First match	Last match	Starting round	Final position	Record							
Competition	First match	Last match	Starting round	Final position	Pld	W	D	L	GF	GA	GD	Win %
Swiss Super League	15 July 2022	29 May 2023	Matchday 1	9th	36	8	8	20	32	66	−34	22.22
Swiss Cup	21 August 2022	9 November 2022	Round 1	Round 3	3	2	0	1	11	1	+10	66.67
Total					39	10	8	21	43	67	−24	25.64

Source: Soccerway

=== Swiss Super League ===
==== League table ====
Pos	Team	Pld	W	D	L	GF	GA	GD	Pts	Qualification or relegation
6	St. Gallen	36	11	12	13	66	52	+14	45	
7	Grasshopper	36	12	8	16	56	64	−8	44	
8	Zürich	36	10	14	12	41	55	−14	44	
9	Winterthur	36	8	8	20	32	66	−34	32	
10	Sion (R)	36	7	10	19	41	73	−32	31	Qualification for the relegation play-off

Source: Swiss Super League
Rules for classification: 1) Points; 2) Goal difference; 3) Goals scored; 4) Head-to-head goal difference; 5) Away goals scored; 6) Draw.
(R) Relegated

==== Results summary ====
Overall								Home						Away					
Pld	W	D	L	GF	GA	GD	Pts	W	D	L	GF	GA	GD	W	D	L	GF	GA	GD
36	8	8	20	32	66	−34	32	5	4	9	15	32	−17	3	4	11	17	34	−17

Source: Swiss Super League

==== Results by round ====
Round	1	2	3	4	5	6	7	8	9	10	11	12	13	14	15	16	17	18	19	20	21	22	23	24	25	26	27	28	29	30	31	32	33	34	35	36
Ground	H	A	H	A	H	H	A	H	A	A	H	H	A	H	A	A	H	A	H	A	H	A	H	A	H	A	H	A	H	A	H	A	A	H	H	A
Result	D	L	L	L	D	L	L	L	W	D	W	W	L	W	D	L	L	L	W	D	D	D	D	L	W	L	L	W	L	L	L	W	L	L	L	L
Position	6	8	9	9	9	9	10	10	9	9	9	9	9	9	9	9	9	10	10	10	10	10	10	10	9	10	10	10	10	10	10	9	9	9	9	9

Source: Swiss Super League
A = Away; H = Home; W = Win; D = Draw; L = Loss

==== Matches ====
The league fixtures were announced on 17 June 2022.

16 July 2022 1	Winterthur	1–1	Basel	Schützenwiese, Winterthur
20:30	Ramizi 3'; Gonçalves (yellow card) 59'; Ramizi (yellow card) 60'; Corbaz (yellow card) 76'	SFL summary	(yellow card) 45' Millar; 70' Burger; (yellow card) 74' Djiga; (yellow card) 90+1' Burger; (yellow card) 90+5' Ndoye	Attendance: 8,400 (sold out); Referee: (Switzerland) Alain Bieri (Solothurn)

23 July 2022 2	St. Gallen	2–0	Winterthur	Kybunpark, St. Gallen
20:30	Schubert 20'; Schubert 40'	SFL summary		Attendance: 15,673; Referee: (Switzerland) Sven Wolfensberger

31 July 2022 3	Winterthur	1–4	Lugano	Stadion Schützenwiese, Winterthur
16:30	Buess 11'	SFL summary	20' Celar; 22' Haile-Selassie; 31' Bottani; 90+1' Celar	Attendance: 7,800; Referee: (Switzerland) Luca Cibelli

6 August 2022 4	Servette	1–0	Winterthur	Stade de Genève, Geneva
18:00	Cognat (yellow card) 8'; Pflücke 81'; Frick (yellow card) 86'	SFV summary	(yellow card) 11' Buess; (yellow card) 38' Rodríguez; (yellow card) 75' Gelmi; (yellow card) 80' Lekaj; (yellow card) 82' Ramizi; (yellow card) 85' Kamberi	Attendance: 4,624; Referee: (Switzerland) Stefan Horisberger

14 August 2022 5	Winterthur	1–1	Zürich	Winterthur
14:15	Rodríguez 73'; Schättin (yellow card) 80'	SFV summary	Santini (yellow card) 37'; Džemaili (yellow card) 41'; Aliti (yellow card) 60'; Kryeziu (yellow card) 84'; Rohner 85'	Stadium: Stadion Schützenwiese; Attendance: 8,400 (sold out); Referee: (Switzerland) Sandro Schärer

28 August 2022 6	Winterthur	1–5	Young Boys	Winterthur
16:30	Buess 3' (pen.); Abedini (yellow card) 39'; Lekaj (yellow card) 85'	SFV summary Report	Camara (yellow card) 9'; Elia 17'; Zesiger (yellow card) 45'; Nsame 50'; Ugrinic 52'; Itten 69' 76'	Stadium: Stadion Schützenwiese; Attendance: 8,400 (sold out); Referee: (Switzerland) Anojen Kanagasingam

4 September 2022 7	Grasshopper Club	3–0	Winterthur	Letzigrund, Zürich
16:30	Kacuri 27'; Ribeiro 60'; Kawabe 62'	SFV summary	(yellow card) 47' Diaby; (yellow card) 85' Manzambi	Attendance: 8,270; Referee: (Switzerland) Nico Gianforte

10 September 2022 8	Winterthur	0–6	Luzern	Stadion Schützenwiese, Winterthur
20:30	Schättin (yellow card) 20'; Buess (yellow card) 64'	SFV summary	14' Meyer; 22' Burch; 25' Abubakar; 32' Meyer; 54' Kadák; (yellow card) 64' Burch; 84' Gentner	Attendance: 8,400 (sold out); Referee: (Switzerland) Johannes von Mandach

2 October 2022 9	Sion	1–3	Winterthur	Stade Tourbillon, Sion
14:15	Ramizi (yellow card) 33'; Balotelli 45+4'; Batata (yellow card) 50'; Lavanchy (yellow card) 77'	SFV summary	(yellow card) 44' Poha; 45' (pen.) Buess; (yellow card) 45+2' Gelmi; 59' Ballet; (yellow card) 75' Ballet; 90+6' Kamberi	Attendance: 8,900; Referee: (Switzerland) Mirel Turkes

9 October 2022 10	Zürich	0–0	Winterthur	Letzigrund, Zürich
16:30	Boranijašević (yellow card) 42'	SFV summary	(yellow card) 33' Arnold; (yellow card) 62' Fayulu; (yellow card) 84' Buess; (yellow card) 90+2' Gonçalves	Attendance: 15,481; Referee: (Switzerland) Luca Piccolo

15 October 2022 11	Winterthur	1–0	Grasshopper	Schützenwiese, Winterthur
20:30 CEST (UTC+2)	Ramizi 53' (yellow card) 74' (red card) 90+7'; Gonçalves (yellow card) 70'; Gelmi (yellow card) 84'; Fayulu (yellow card) 86'; Gantenbein (yellow card) 87'	SFL summary	(yellow card) 9' Abrashi; (yellow card) 37' Schettine; (yellow card) 43' Jeong; (yellow card) 83' Pusic	Attendance: 8,400 (sold out); Referee: (Switzerland) Luca Cibelli; Assistant referees: (Switzerland) Sascha Kever (VAR)

18 October 2022 12	Winterthur	1–0	Sion	Stadion Schützenwiese, Winterthur
20:30	Di Giusto 25'; Diaby (yellow card) 76'	SFL summary	(yellow card) 26' Batata	Attendance: 8,000; Referee: (Switzerland) Alessandro Dudic; Assistant referees: (Switzerland) Sascha Kever (VAR)

23 October 2022 13	Basel	3–1	Winterthur	St. Jakob-Park, Basel
14:15	Comas 2' (1:0); Comas 8' (2:0); Comas (yellow card) 23'; Millar (yellow card) 48'; Fink 58' (3:0); Males (yellow card) 67'	SFL summary	(yellow card) 36' Corbaz; (yellow card) 64' Seiler; 90+1' (3:1) Seiler	Attendance: 22,027; Referee: (Switzerland) Esther Staubli

30 October 2022 14	Winterthur	1–0	St. Gallen	Stadion Schützenwiese, Winterthur
16:30	Burkart 21'; Ramizi (yellow card) 26'; Seiler (yellow card) 87'	SFL summary	(yellow card) 42' Maglica; (yellow card) 61' Schmidt	Attendance: 8,400 (sold out); Referee: (Switzerland) Johannes von Mandach

5 November 2022 15	Luzern	1–1	Winterthur	Swissporarena, Luzern
20:30	Beloko (yellow card) 29'; Meyer (yellow card) 33'; Abubakar 51'; Chader (yellow card) 55' (yellow-red card) 83'	SFL summary	15' Di Giusto; (yellow card) 25' Gelmi; (yellow card) 33' Lekaj; (yellow card) 39' Corbaz; (yellow card) 75' Kamberi	Attendance: 11,516; Referee: (Switzerland) Luca Piccolo

13 November 2022 16	Lugano	3–1	Winterthur	Cornaredo, Lugano
16:30	Celar 7'; Celar 15'; Arigoni (yellow card) 33'; Valenzuela (yellow card) 50'; Amoura (yellow card) 89' (goal) 89'	SFL summary	20' Di Giusto	Attendance: 3,140; Referee: (Switzerland) Luca Cibelli

15 February 2023 17	Winterthur	1–2	Servette	Winterthur
18:45 CET	Ardaiz 53'; Gantenbein (yellow card) 72'	SFL summary Report	(yellow card) 52' Antunes; 63' Stevanović; 77' Valls	Stadium: Stadion Schützenwiese; Attendance: 7,800; Referee: (Switzerland) Stefan Horisberger

29 January 2023 Round 18	Young Boys	5–1	Winterthur	Stadion Wankdorf, Bern
14:15 CET	Nsame 17' 52' 79'; Niasse (yellow card) 22'; Itten 24' 27'; Blum (yellow card) 31'; Rieder (yellow card) 74'	Report	Burkart (yellow card) 7'; Ramizi 40' (pen.); Ltaief (yellow card) 85'	Attendance: 27,310; Referee: (Switzerland) Sven Wolfensberger

4 February 2023 19	Winterthur	1–0	Lugano	Stadion Schützenwiese, Winterthur
16:30	Arnold (yellow card) 41'; Di Giusto 45'; Burkart (yellow card) 53'; Diaby (yellow card) 70'	SFL summary	(yellow card) 18' (yellow-red card) 90+5' Bottani; (yellow card) 38' Espinoza	Attendance: 7,500; Referee: (Switzerland) Nico Gianforte

12 February 2023 20	Zürich	1–1	Winterthur	Letzigrund, Zürich
16:30	Aliti (yellow card) 30'; Tosin 32'; Condé (yellow card) 46'; Seiler (yellow card) 62'	SFL summary	(yellow card) 16' Ramizi; 39' Ramizi; (yellow card) 42' Schmid; (yellow card) 44' Arnold; (yellow card) 62' Lekaj; (yellow card) 90+3' Ballet	Attendance: 13,690; Referee: (Switzerland) Luca Cibelli

18 February 2023 21	Winterthur	1–1	Sion	Stadion Schützenwiese, Winterthur
18:00	Ramizi 17' (pen.); Gantenbein (yellow card) 41'; Ramizi (yellow card) 61'; Schmid (yellow card) 71'	SFL summary	(yellow card) 15' Schmied; (yellow card) 65' Moubandje; (yellow card) 72' Balotelli; Sio 85'	Attendance: 8,200; Referee: (Switzerland) Sven Wolfensberger

26 February 2023 22	Servette	1–1	Winterthur	Stade de Genève, Geneva
16:30	Severin 42'; Crivelli (yellow card) 69'	SFL summary	(yellow card) 44' Schmid; 52' Ardaiz; (yellow card) 77' Ramizi; (yellow card) 81' Arnold	Attendance: 6,123; Referee: (Switzerland) Esther Staubli

4 March 2023 23	Winterthur	1–1	Young Boys	Stadion Schützenwiese, Winterthur
18:00	Buess 62'	SFL summary	21' Elia; (yellow card) 62' Zesiger; (yellow card) 73' Fassnacht	Attendance: 8,400 (sold out); Referee: (Switzerland) Luca Piccolo

12 March 2023 24	Grasshopper Club	2–1	Winterthur	Letzigrund, Zürich
16:30	Dadashov 41' (yellow card) 90+4'; Schettine (yellow card) 51' (goal) 63'; Seko (yellow card) 77'; Herc (yellow card) 90+1'	SFL summary	(yellow card) 10' Corbaz; 47' Rodríguez; (yellow card) 53' Gonçalves	Attendance: 7,343; Referee: (Switzerland) Sven Wolfensberger; Assistant referees: Alessandro Dudic (VAR); Man of the Match: Renat Dadashov

19 March 2023 25	Winterthur	1–0	St. Gallen	Stadion Schützenwiese, Winterthur
14:15	Arnold (yellow card) 33'; Holenstein 53'; Abedini (yellow card) 71'	SFL summary	(yellow card) 45' Görtler; (yellow card) 70' Schmidt	Attendance: 8,400 (sold out); Referee: (Switzerland) Stefan Horisberger

1 April 2023 26	Basel	2–0	Winterthur	St. Jakob-Park, Basel
20:30	Augustin 25'; Xhaka (yellow card) 21'; Diouf (yellow card) 78'; Fink 85'	SFL summary FCB report	(yellow card) 12' Arnold	Attendance: 19,921; Referee: (Switzerland) Luca Piccolo
Note: Before the match, one minute silence in honor of the deceased former FCB player Peter Marti

10 April 2023 27	Winterthur	1–2	Luzern	Stadion Schützenwiese, Winterthur
15:30	Ltaief 78'; Lekaj (yellow card) 80'; Ltaief (yellow card) 90+1'	SFL summary	(yellow card) 6' Villiger; 26' Chader; (yellow card) 49' Dräger; (yellow card) 51' Beka; 60' Sorgić; (yellow card) 77' Frýdek; (yellow card) 84' Ottiger; (yellow card) 90+1' Beloko	Attendance: 8,400 (sold out); Referee: (Switzerland) Johannes von Mandach

16 April 2023 28	St. Gallen	2–3	Winterthur	Kybunpark, St. Gallen
14:30	Latte Lath (yellow card) 12'; Schmidt 18'; Guillemenot 28'; Guillemenot (yellow card) 80'; Ati-Zigi (yellow card) 82'; Görtler (yellow card) 90+2'	SFL summary	7' Burkart; 37' Di Giusto; 43' Di Giusto; (yellow card) 52' Lekaj; (yellow card) 56' Ltaief; (yellow card) 74' Arnold; (yellow card) 90+2' Rodríguez; (yellow card) 90+4' Kryeziu	Attendance: 18,376; Referee: (Switzerland) Esther Staubli

22 April 2023 29	Winterthur	1–2	Grasshopper Club	Stadion Schützenwiese, Winterthur
18:00	Diaby (red card) 22'; Buess 86' (pen.)	SFL summary	3' Herc; (yellow card) 35' Bolla; 45+1' Dadashov; (yellow card) 84' Schmid; (yellow card) 90+5' Abrashi	Attendance: 8,400; Referee: (Switzerland) Fedayi San; Assistant referees: (VAR) (Switzerland) Sascha Kever

27 April 2023 30	Luzern	3–1	Winterthur	Swissporarena, Luzern
20:30	Meyer (yellow card) 35'; Dorn 40'; Burch (yellow card) 62'; Sorgić 65'; Beloko (yellow card) 70'; Schürpf 81'	SFL summary	25' Ardaiz; (yellow card) 39' Kryeziu; (yellow card) 88' Corbaz	Attendance: 10,865; Referee: (Switzerland) Luca Piccolo; Assistant referees: (VAR) (Switzerland) Johannes von Mandach

30 April 2023 31	Winterthur	1–4	Basel	Schützenwiese, Winterthur
16:30	Burkart (yellow card) 6'; Ardaiz 21' (pen.); Gelmi (yellow card) 56'; Ramizi (yellow card) 56'	SFL summary FCB report	7' Adams; 12' Males; (yellow card) 24' Heiko Vogel (coach); (yellow card) 33' Ndoye; (yellow card) 45' Diouf; 71' Amdouni; 83' Zeqiri	Attendance: 8,400 (sold out); Referee: (Switzerland) Fedayi San (Gebenstorf); Assistant referees: (VAR) (Switzerland) Lukas Fähndrich

6 May 2023 32	Sion	0–1	Winterthur	Stade Tourbillon, Sion
18:00	Chouaref (yellow card) 16'; Balotelli (yellow card) 71'; Cyprien (yellow card) 78'	SFL summary	21' Burkart; (yellow card) 56' Kryeziu; Di Giusto (yellow card) 73'; Gonçalves (yellow card) 77'; Ltaief (yellow card) 88'	Attendance: 9,800; Referee: (Switzerland) Luca Cibelli; Assistant referees: (VAR) (Switzerland) Sascha Kever

14 May 2023 33	Lugano	2–1	Winterthur	Cornaredo, Lugano
16:30

20 May 2023 34	Winterthur	0–1	Servette	Stadion Schützenwiese, Winterthur
18:00

25 May 2023 35	Winterthur	0–2	Zürich	Stadion Schützenwiese, Winterthur
20:30

29 May 2023 36	Young Boys	2–1	Winterthur	Stadion Wankdorf, Bern
16:30

=== Swiss Cup ===
21 August 2022 Round 1	FC Muri	0–7	Winterthur	Wohlen
14:30 CEST (UTC+2)				Stadium: Stadion Niedermatten

17 September 2022 Round 2	FC Meyrin	0–4	Winterthur	Meyrin
15:00 CEST (UTC+2)				Stadium: Stade des Arbères

9 November 2022 Round 3	Lugano	1–0	Winterthur	Lugano
20:30 CET (UTC+1)	Bottani 67'	Report		Stadium: Cornaredo Stadium
