= List of Swiss football transfers summer 2020 =

This is a list of Swiss football transfers for the 2020 summer transfer window. Only transfers featuring Swiss Super League are listed.

== Swiss Super League ==
Note: Flags indicate national team as has been defined under FIFA eligibility rules. Players may hold more than one non-FIFA nationality.

=== Young Boys ===
In:

No.	Pos.	Nation	Player
17	FW	FRA	Jordan Siebatcheu (on loan from (France) Rennes)
24	DF	SUI	Quentin Maceiras (from Sion)
25	DF	FRA	Jordan Lefort (from (France) Amiens, previously on loan)
36	DF	SUI	Silvan Hefti (from St. Gallen)
91	GK	SUI	Guillaume Faivre (from Thun)

Out:

No.	Pos.	Nation	Player
1	GK	SUI	Marco Wölfli (retired)
3	DF	DEN	Frederik Sørensen (loan return to (Germany) 1. FC Köln)
23	DF	SUI	Saidy Janko (loan return to (Portugal) Porto)
27	DF	SUI	Pascal Schüpbach (on loan to Winterthur)
29	DF	SUI	Jordan Lotomba (to (France) Nice)
40	GK	SUI	Dario Marzino (on loan to Winterthur)
99	FW	FRA	Guillaume Hoarau (to Sion)
—	DF	SUI	Jan Kronig (on loan to Wil, previously on loan at Schaffhausen)
—	DF	SUI	Linus Obexer (on loan to Vaduz, previously on loan at Lugano)
—	DF	SUI	Joël Schmied (to Vaduz, previously on loan at Wil)
—	MF	SUI	Pedro Teixeira (to Xamax, previously on loan at Kriens)
—	FW	CIV	Roger Assalé (to (France) Dijon, previously on loan at (Spain) Leganés)

=== St. Gallen ===
In:

No.	Pos.	Nation	Player
6	MF	SUI	Basil Stillhart (from Thun)
7	FW	ALB	Florian Kamberi (from (Scotland) Hibernian, previously on loan at (Scotland) Rangers)
18	GK	GER	Lukas Watkowiak (from (Germany) Wehen Wiesbaden)
24	MF	SUI	Kwadwo Duah (from Wil)
20	FW	FRA	Élie Youan (on loan from (France) Nantes)
25	FW	SEN	Boubacar Traorè (from (Israel) Hapoel Kfar Saba)
55	MF	BFA	Salifou Diarrassouba (on loan from (Ivory Coast) Mimosas)

Out:

No.	Pos.	Nation	Player
10	FW	BIH	Ermedin Demirović (loan return to (Spain) Alavés)
13	FW	SUI	Cedric Itten (to (Scotland) Rangers)
15	DF	SRB	Milan Vilotić (free agent)
18	GK	USA	Jonathan Klinsmann (to (United States) LA Galaxy)
20	MF	SUI	Moreno Costanzo (retired)
28	DF	TUN	Sliman Kchouk (to (Tunisia) Stade Tunisien)
36	DF	SUI	Silvan Hefti (to Young Boys)

=== Basel ===
In:

No.	Pos.	Nation	Player
13	GK	AUT	Heinz Lindner (from (Germany) Wehen Wiesbaden)
17	DF	SUI	Timm Klose (on loan from (England) Norwich City)
23	MF	SUI	Pajtim Kasami (from Sion)
30	MF	KOS	Edon Zhegrova (from (Belgium) Genk, previously on loan)
72	MF	SUI	Andrea Padula (from Wil)
96	DF	BRA	Jorge (on loan from (France) Monaco)
98	FW	BRA	Arthur (from (Brazil) Palmeiras, previously on loan)
—	FW	SEN	Kaly Sene (from (Italy) Juventus)

Out:

No.	Pos.	Nation	Player
1	GK	SUI	Jonas Omlin (to (France) Montpellier)
6	DF	PAR	Omar Alderete (to (Germany) Hertha BSC)
8	MF	SRB	Zdravko Kuzmanović (retired)
15	DF	PAR	Blas Riveros (to (Sweden) Brøndby)
33	MF	SUI	Kevin Bua (to (Spain) Leganés)
36	DF	SWE	Emil Bergström (loan return to (Netherlands) Utrecht)
99	FW	GER	Kemal Ademi (to (Turkey) Fenerbahçe)
—	FW	SEN	Kaly Sene (on loan to (Cyprus) Omonia)
—	DF	SUI	Yves Kaiser (to Xamax, previously on loan at Schaffhausen)
—	DF	SUI	Dominik Schmid (free agent to Grasshoppers, previously on loan at Wil)
—	MF	SUI	Martin Liechti (free agent to (Greece) Rodos, previously on loan at Winterthur)

=== Servette ===
In:

No.	Pos.	Nation	Player
7	DF	FRA	Moussa Diallo (free agent from (France) Cholet)
15	MF	FRA	Theo Valls (from (France) Nîmes)
24	DF	SEN	Arial Mendy (from (France) Lens, previously on loan at (France) Orléans)
35	FW	FRA	Boubacar Fofana (from (France) Lyon B)

Out:

No.	Pos.	Nation	Player
3	DF	FRA	Christopher Routis (to Stade Lausanne Ouchy)
7	FW	SUI	Steven Lang (free agent)
10	MF	SUI	Sébastien Wüthrich (to (Romania) Astra Giurgiu)
14	MF	ITA	Andrea Maccoppi (on loan to Chiasso)
15	DF	SUI	Michael Gonçalves (to Winterthur)
16	FW	KOR	Park Jung-bin (free agent)
20	MF	GER	Varol Tasar (on loan to Luzern)
21	DF	SUI	Dennis Iapichino (to Sion)
26	GK	SUI	Joao Castanheira (to Étoile Carouge)
28	DF	FRA	Rayan Souici (loan return to (France) Saint-Étienne)
42	DF	SUI	Lucas Monteiro (on loan to Étoile Carouge)
—	DF	SUI	Mathis Magnin (on loan to Chiasso)
—	DF	COD	Christopher Mfuyi (free agent to Étoile Carouge, previously on loan at Stade Lausanne Ouchy)

=== Lugano ===
In:

No.	Pos.	Nation	Player
3	DF	ESP	Adrià Guerrero (on loan from (Spain) Valencia)
7	DF	SUI	Mickaël Facchinetti (on loan from Sion)
9	FW	DEN	Jens Odgaard (on loan from (Italy) Sassuolo, previously on loan at (Netherlands) Heerenveen)
18	FW	FRA	Kévin Monzialo (on loan from (Italy) Juventus, previously on loan at Grasshoppers)
23	FW	URU	Joaquín Ardaiz (from Chiasso)
25	DF	LVA	Mārcis Ošs (on loan from (Latvia) Spartaks, previously on loan at Xamax)
47	MF	GHA	Ransford Selasi (from (Italy) Juventus, previously on loan)
58	GK	NGA	Sebastian Osigwe (free agent from Kriens)

Out:

No.	Pos.	Nation	Player
1	GK	SUI	David Da Costa (to Schaffhausen)
2	DF	SUI	Joel Untersee (free agent)
3	DF	BRA	Jefferson (to (Portugal) Casa Pia)
11	FW	HUN	Filip Holender (on loan to (Serbia) Partizan)
18	DF	CIV	Eloge Yao (free agent)
21	DF	SUI	Linus Obexer (loan return to Young Boys)
23	DF	BIH	Daniel Pavlović (free agent)
27	FW	NGA	Franklin Sasere (on loan to (Malta) Ħamrun Spartans)
28	DF	SUI	Fulvio Sulmoni (retired)
33	MF	SVN	Domen Črnigoj (to (Italy) Venezia)
68	MF	SUI	Francisco Rodríguez (to Schaffhausen)
70	MF	SUI	Marco Aratore (loan return to (Russia) Ural)
—	DF	ITA	Leonardo Rivoira (on loan to Bellinzona, previously on loan at (Spain) Novelda)
—	MF	NGA	Chinwendu Nkama (on loan to (Slovenia) Gorica, previously on loan at (Slovenia) Postojna)
—	FW	KOS	Leotrim Kryeziu (on loan to (Kosovo) Prishtina, previously on loan at Chiasso)
—	FW	ITA	Carlo Manicone (on loan to (Italy) Grosseto, previously on loan at (Italy) Pianese)
—	MF	KOS	Eris Abedini (to (Spain) Recreativo Granada, previously on loan at Wil)

=== Luzern ===
In:

No.	Pos.	Nation	Player
9	FW	SRB	Dejan Sorgić (from (France) Auxerre)
10	MF	AUT	Louis Schaub (on loan from (Germany) 1. FC Köln, previously on loan at (Germany) Hamburger SV)
13	DF	CZE	Martin Frýdek (from (Czech Republic) Sparta Prague)
14	MF	ESP	Álex Carbonell (from (Spain) Valencia, previously on loan at (Netherlands) Fortuna Sittard)
22	FW	CMR	Yvan Alounga (from Aarau)
23	MF	GHA	Samuel Alabi (from (Israel) Ashdod)
29	MF	GER	Varol Tasar (on loan from Servette)

Out:

No.	Pos.	Nation	Player
2	DF	GEO	Otar Kakabadze (to (Spain) Tenerife)
9	FW	ITA	Francesco Margiotta (free agent to (Italy) Chievo)
10	FW	NGA	Blessing Eleke (to (Belgium) Beerschot)
20	FW	KOS	Shkelqim Demhasaj (to Grasshoppers)
23	GK	SUI	Simon Enzler (on loan to Aarau)
25	MF	SUI	David Mistrafović (on loan to Kriens)
28	MF	CIV	Eric Tia (to Xamax)
29	FW	SUI	Darian Males (to (Italy) Inter)
42	MF	KOS	Idriz Voca (to (Turkey) Ankaragücü)
77	FW	BRA	Ryder Matos (loan return to (Italy) Udinese)
—	MF	SUI	Stefan Wolf (free agent, previously on loan at Chiasso)

=== Zürich ===
In:

No.	Pos.	Nation	Player
1	GK	BIH	Živko Kostadinović (from Wil)
5	DF	GER	Lasse Sobiech (on loan from (Germany) 1. FC Köln, previously on loan at (Belgium) Mouscron)
6	DF	KOS	Fidan Aliti (on loan from (Sweden) Kalmar)
19	DF	SUI	Tobias Schättin (from Winterthur)
20	MF	CIV	Ousmane Doumbia (from Winterthur)
37	FW	ITA	Wilfried Gnonto (from (Italy) Inter)

Out:

No.	Pos.	Nation	Player
1	GK	LVA	Andris Vanins (retired)
5	DF	GEO	Levan Kharabadze (loan return to (Georgia (country)) Dinamo Tbilisi)
12	DF	DEN	Mads Pedersen (loan return to (Germany) FC Augsburg)
13	DF	GAM	Pa Modou (free agent)
19	MF	FRA	Yassin Maouche (free agent)
22	DF	SUI	Kevin Rüegg (to (Italy) Hellas Verona)
23	FW	MAR	Mimoun Mahi (to (Netherlands) Utrecht)
24	DF	PHI	Michael Kempter (to Xamax)
29	MF	SEN	Sangoné Sarr (to Schaffhausen)
34	DF	SUI	Ilan Sauter (on loan to Wil)
35	MF	SUI	Simon Sohm (to (Italy) Parma)
41	MF	SUI	Lavdim Zumberi (to Wil)
50	FW	SUI	Yann Kasaï (free agent)
—	DF	SUI	Lindrit Kamberi (on loan to Winterthur, previously on loan at Wil)
—	MF	SUI	Bledian Krasniqi (loan extension to Wil)
—	MF	SUI	Izer Aliu (on loan to Kriens, previously on loan at Chiasso)
—	MF	SUI	Maren Haile-Selassie (on loan to Wil, previously on loan at Xamax)
—	GK	AUT	Osman Hadžikić (to (Austria) Admira Wacker, previously on loan at (Croatia) Inter Zaprešić)
—	MF	SUI	Albin Sadrijaj (to Kriens, previously on loan)

=== Sion ===
In:

No.	Pos.	Nation	Player
4	DF	SUI	Nikita Vlasenko (on loan from (Italy) Juventus)
7	MF	ITA	Luca Clemenza (from (Italy) Juventus, previously on loan at (Italy) Pescara)
17	FW	SUI	Gaëtan Karlen (from Xamax)
20	MF	SUI	Musa Araz (from Xamax)
21	DF	SUI	Dennis Iapichino (from Servette)
23	MF	SUI	Matteo Tosetti (from Thun)
26	MF	CIV	Serey Dié (from Xamax)
27	DF	SUI	Ivan Martić (free agent)
99	FW	FRA	Guillaume Hoarau (from Young Boys)

Out:

No.	Pos.	Nation	Player
1	GK	RUS	Anton Mitryushkin (free agent to (Germany) Fortuna Düsseldorf)
7	MF	SUI	Pajtim Kasami (to Basel)
11	FW	SUI	Filip Stojilković (on loan to Aarau)
22	MF	TUR	Berkan Kutlu (to (Turkey) Alanyaspor)
24	MF	SUI	Bastien Toma (to (Belgium) Genk)
33	MF	ALB	Ermir Lenjani (to Grasshoppers)
45	DF	SUI	Mickaël Facchinetti (on loan to Lugano)
62	DF	SUI	Quentin Maceiras (to Young Boys)
66	MF	ANG	Joaquim Adão (to (Angola) Petro de Luanda)
90	FW	BRA	Philippe (to (Brazil) Vila Nova)
—	DF	SUI	Ivan Lurati (loan extension to Bellinzona)
—	MF	BRA	Adryan (to (Brazil) Avaí, previously on loan)
—	MF	SUI	Nikola Milosavljevic (to Bellinzona, previously on loan)

=== Lausanne ===
In:

No.	Pos.	Nation	Player
2	MF	CIV	Trazié Thomas (on loan from (France) Nice)
4	DF	GER	Moritz Jenz (from (England) Fulham)
9	FW	FRA	Evann Guessand (on loan from (France) Nice)
10	FW	FRA	Lucas Da Cunha (on loan from (France) Nice)
17	FW	NOR	Rafik Zekhnini (on loan from (Italy) Fiorentina, previously on loan at (Netherlands) Twente)
22	DF	SUI	Marc Tsoungui (from (Italy) Napoli)
24	DF	CIV	Armel Zohouri (on loan from (France) Nice)
38	MF	POR	Pedro Brazão (on loan from (France) Nice)

Out:

No.	Pos.	Nation	Player
9	FW	SUI	Andi Zeqiri (to (England) Brighton)
14	MF	SUI	Alexandre Pasche (to Xamax)
17	MF	SUI	João Oliveira (free agent)
18	GK	SUI	Dany da Silva (to Stade Lausanne-Ouchy)
20	MF	SUI	Maxime Dominguez (to Xamax)
23	DF	CGO	Igor Nganga (retired)
27	FW	SUI	Dan Ndoye (loan return to (France) Nice)
88	MF	SUI	Cabral (free agent)

=== Vaduz ===
In:

No.	Pos.	Nation	Player
5	DF	SUI	Joël Schmied (from Young Boys, previously on loan at Wil)
6	DF	KOS	Fuad Rahimi (from Wil, previously on loan)
7	FW	SUI	Matteo Di Giusto (from Zürich youth)
22	DF	GER	Nico Hug (from (Germany) Freiburg II)
27	DF	SUI	Linus Obexer (on loan from Young Boys, previously on loan at Lugano)
29	MF	AUT	Sebastian Santin (from (Austria) WSG Tirol)

Out:

No.	Pos.	Nation	Player
5	DF	SUI	Berkay Sülüngöz (to (Turkey) Altay)
16	MF	LIE	Aron Sele (to Chur 97)
17	MF	SUI	Dominik Schwizer (loan return to Thun)
20	MF	SRB	Besart Bajrami (on loan to Balzers)
22	DF	LIE	Jens Hofer (to Biel-Bienne)
25	FW	LIE	Noah Frick (to Xamax)
—	DF	LIE	Manuel Mikus (to Balzers, previously on loan)

== See also ==
- 2020–21 Swiss Super League
