= List of Swiss football transfers summer 2024 =

This is a list of Swiss football transfers for the 2024 summer transfer window. Only transfers featuring Swiss Super League are listed.

== Swiss Super League ==
Note: Flags indicate national team as has been defined under FIFA eligibility rules. Players may hold more than one non-FIFA nationality.

=== Young Boys ===
In:

No.	Pos.	Nation	Player
4	DF	FRA	Tanguy Zoukrou (from (France) Troyes)
11	MF	GAM	Ebrima Colley (from (Italy) Atalanta, previously on loan)
31	FW	GUI	Facinet Conte (from (France) Bastia)

Out:

No.	Pos.	Nation	Player
4	DF	SUI	Aurèle Amenda (loan return to (Germany) Eintracht Frankfurt)
28	DF	SUI	Fabian Lustenberger (retired)
32	FW	NOR	Joel Mvuka (loan return to (France) Lorient)

=== Lugano ===
In:

No.	Pos.	Nation	Player
2	DF	CAN	Zachary Brault-Guillard (free agent)
6	MF	GER	Antonios Papadopoulos (from (Germany) Borussia Dortmund II)
27	MF	SUI	Daniel Dos Santos (from Thun)

Out:

No.	Pos.	Nation	Player
4	DF	KOS	Kreshnik Hajrizi (to (Poland) Widzew Łódź)
6	DF	ECU	Jhon Espinoza (free agent)
14	MF	URU	Jonathan Sabbatini (free agent)
36	DF	USA	Justin Reynolds (loan return to (United States) Chicago Fire)
—	DF	BIH	Leonid Srdić (free agent)
—	FW	USA	Giovanni D'Agostino (free agent)
—	MF	SUI	Adrian Durrer (to Winterthur, previously on loan)
—	FW	SUI	Nikolas Muci (to Grasshoppers, previously on loan at Wil)

=== Servette ===
In:

No.	Pos.	Nation	Player
11	FW	SUI	Julian von Moos (from St. Gallen)
23	DF	FRA	Sofyane Bouzamoucha (from (France) Rouen)

Out:

No.	Pos.	Nation	Player
2	DF	TUN	Omar Rekik (loan return to (England) Arsenal)
7	FW	JPN	Takuma Nishimura (loan return to (Japan) Yokohama F. Marinos)
11	FW	SEN	Bassirou N'Diaye (loan return to (France) Lorient)
12	DF	SUI	Issa Kaloga (to Stade Lausanne Ouchy)
22	FW	DEN	Alexander Lyng (on loan to (Denmark) Sønderjyske)
25	DF	TUN	Dylan Bronn (loan return to (Italy) US Salernitana 1919)
68	DF	CMR	Jérôme Onguéné (loan return to (Germany) Eintracht Frankfurt)
77	DF	HUN	Bendegúz Bolla (loan return to (England) Wolverhampton Wanderers)
—	DF	SUI	Noah Henchoz (to Étoile Carouge, previously on loan)
—	MF	FRA	Hussayn Touati (to Neuchâtel Xamax, previously on loan at Wil)
—	FW	FRA	Ronny Rodelin (free agent, previously on loan at Perly-Certoux)

=== Zürich ===
In:

No.	Pos.	Nation	Player
3	DF	SRB	Nemanja Tošić (from (Serbia) Čukarički)
9	FW	COL	Juan José Perea (on loan from (Germany) VfB Stuttgart, previously on loan at (Germany) Hansa Rostock)
16	DF	ISR	Doron Leidner (on loan from (Greece) Olympiacos)
19	FW	CIV	Fernand Gouré (on loan from (Belgium) Westerlo, previously on loan at (Slovakia) Dunajská Streda)
—	DF	ARG	Mariano Gómez (from (Spain) Atlético Madrid B)
—	FW	FRA	Mounir Chouiar (on loan from (Bulgaria) Ludogorets Razgrad, previously on loan at (France) Amiens)
—	FW	NGA	Umeh Emmanuel (from (Bulgaria) Botev Plovdiv)

Out:

No.	Pos.	Nation	Player
3	DF	ESP	Adrià Guerrero (free agent)
9	FW	CRO	Ivan Santini (free agent)
16	DF	GER	Marc Hornschuh (to (Germany) Freiburg II)
19	DF	SRB	Nikola Boranijašević (free agent)
23	MF	SUI	Fabian Rohner (to Winterthur)
28	DF	SUI	Ramon Guzzo (on loan to Wil)
40	GK	SUI	Alan Omerovic (to Rapperswil-Jona)
44	DF	MLI	Amadou Danté (loan return to (Austria) Sturm Graz)
—	GK	SUI	Gianni De Nitti (to Schaffhausen, previously on loan)

=== St. Gallen ===
In:

No.	Pos.	Nation	Player
5	DF	GHA	Stephan Ambrosius (from (Germany) Hamburger SV)
22	MF	GER	Konrad Faber (from (Germany) Jahn Regensburg)

Out:

No.	Pos.	Nation	Player
5	DF	GER	Justin Janitzek (loan return to (Germany) Bayern Munich II)
6	DF	SUI	Patrick Sutter (to Stade Lausanne Ouchy)
7	FW	AUT	Fabian Schubert (to (Germany) 1860 Munich)
11	FW	SUI	Julian von Moos (to Servette)
31	MF	NED	Richard van der Venne (to (Netherlands) RKC Waalwijk)
46	DF	ITA	Mattia Zanotti (loan return to (Italy) Inter Milan)
—	DF	SUI	Leonidas Stergiou (to (Germany) VfB Stuttgart, previously on loan)

=== Winterthur ===
In:

No.	Pos.	Nation	Player
17	FW	SUI	Albin Krasniqi (from St. Gallen II)
19	MF	SUI	Elias Maluvunu (from Young Boys II)
22	MF	SUI	Adrian Durrer (from Lugano, previously on loan)
27	MF	SUI	Fabian Rohner (from Zürich)
75	GK	SUI	Antonio Spagnoli (from Basel II)
—	FW	SEN	Christian Gomis (from Stade Nyonnais)

Out:

No.	Pos.	Nation	Player
14	MF	SUI	Thibault Corbaz (free agent)
15	DF	SUI	Michael Gonçalves (to Neuchâtel Xamax)
19	DF	SUI	Adrian Gantenbein (to (Germany) Schalke 04)
27	GK	SUI	Armin Abaz (free agent)
33	GK	SUI	Marvin Keller (loan return to Young Boys)
44	MF	SUI	Francisco Rodríguez (free agent)
45	GK	SUI	Alexandre Jankewitz (loan return to Young Boys)
70	FW	TUN	Sayfallah Ltaief (loan return to Basel)

=== Luzern ===
In:

No.	Pos.	Nation	Player
3	DF	SWE	Jesper Löfgren (from (Sweden) Djurgården, previously on loan)
8	MF	SRB	Aleksandar Stanković (on loan from (Italy) Inter Milan)
10	FW	GER	Sinan Karweina (from Austria Klagenfurt)
14	DF	LVA	Andrejs Cigaņiks (from (Poland) Widzew Łódź)

Out:

No.	Pos.	Nation	Player
5	DF	SUI	Denis Simani (to (Liechtenstein) Vaduz)
6	MF	SUI	Ardon Jashari (to (Belgium) Club Brugge)
7	MF	GER	Max Meyer (to (Cyprus) APOEL)
9	FW	AUT	Adrian Grbić (loan return to (France) Lorient)
11	FW	FRA	Teddy Okou (on loan to Lausanne)
13	DF	CZE	Martin Frýdek (free agent)
23	DF	SUI	Mauricio Willimann (on loan to Schaffhausen)
26	MF	SUI	Iwan Hegglin (on loan to Schaffhausen)
32	MF	SUI	Nicolas Haas (loan return to (Italy) Empoli)
41	MF	SUI	Noah Rupp (to (Germany) Karlsruher SC)
99	FW	SUI	Kemal Ademi (to (Croatia) Osijek)
—	DF	SUI	Serkan Izmirlioglu (free agent)
—	MF	SUI	Samuele Campo (free agent)
—	MF	GHA	Samuel Alabi (free agent, previously on loan at Baden)
—	DF	SUI	Thoma Monney (to Baden, previously on loan at Biel-Bienne)
—	FW	GER	Varol Tasar (to Yverdon, previously on loan)
—	FW	SUI	Yvan Alounga (to (Austria) Lafnitz, previously on loan at Bellinzona)

=== Basel ===
In:

No.	Pos.	Nation	Player
22	MF	FRA	Léo Leroy (from (France) Montpellier)
27	DF	SUI	Kevin Rüegg (from (Italy) Hellas Verona, previously on loan)

Out:

No.	Pos.	Nation	Player
11	FW	GER	Maurice Malone (on loan to Austria Wien)
16	GK	SUI	Nils de Mol (free agent)
17	FW	SUI	Andrin Hunziker (on loan to (Germany) Karlsruher SC)
19	MF	AUT	Yusuf Demir (loan return to (Turkey) Galatasaray)
22	DF	ESP	Sergio López (to (Germany) Darmstadt 98)
28	MF	SUI	Dion Kacuri (on loan to Yverdon)
99	FW	SRB	Đorđe Jovanović (on loan to (Serbia) Partizan)
—	GK	SUI	Tim Spycher (on loan to Stade Nyonnais, previously on loan at Baden)
—	DF	BFA	Nasser Djiga (to (Serbia) Red Star Belgrade, previously on loan)
—	FW	TUN	Sayfallah Ltaief (to (Netherlands) Twente, previously on loan at Winterthur)

=== Yverdon ===
In:

No.	Pos.	Nation	Player
2	DF	BEN	Mohamed Tijani (from (Czech Republic) Viktoria Plzeň, previously on loan)
16	GK	SUI	Maxime Rouiller (from Lausanne II)
27	FW	GER	Varol Tasar (from Luzern, previously on loan)
—	FW	FRA	Hugo Komano (from (Bulgaria) Pirin Blagoevgrad)
—	MF	FRA	Fodé Sylla (on loan from (France) Lens B)
—	MF	SUI	Dion Kacuri (on loan from Basel)

Out:

No.	Pos.	Nation	Player

=== Lausanne ===
In:

No.	Pos.	Nation	Player
92	FW	FRA	Teddy Okou (on loan from Luzern)

Out:

No.	Pos.	Nation	Player

=== Grasshoppers ===
In:

No.	Pos.	Nation	Player
9	FW	SUI	Nikolas Muci (from Lugano, previously on loan at Wil)

Out:

No.	Pos.	Nation	Player

=== Sion ===
In:

No.	Pos.	Nation	Player

Out:

No.	Pos.	Nation	Player

== See also ==
- 2024–25 Swiss Super League
