= List of Swiss football transfers summer 2018 =

This is a list of Swiss football transfers for the 2018 summer transfer window. Only transfers featuring Swiss Super League are listed.

== Swiss Super League ==
Note: Flags indicate national team as has been defined under FIFA eligibility rules. Players may hold more than one non-FIFA nationality.

=== Basel ===
In:

No.	Pos.	Nation	Player
1	GK	SUI	Jonas Omlin (from Luzern)
3	DF	GRE	Konstantinos Dimitriou (from (Greece) PAOK)
5	DF	SUI	Silvan Widmer (from (Italy) Udinese)
18	FW	SUI	Julian von Moos (from Grasshoppers U18)
19	FW	SUI	Dimitri Oberlin (from (Austria) Red Bull Salzburg, previously on loan)
26	MF	FRA	Aldo Kalulu (from (France) Lyon, previously on loan at (France) Sochaux)
35	GK	DEN	Martin Hansen (from (Germany) FC Ingolstadt 04, previously on loan at (Netherlands) Heerenveen)

Out:

No.	Pos.	Nation	Player
1	GK	CZE	Tomáš Vaclík (to (Spain) Sevilla)
3	DF	SUI	Léo Lacroix (loan return to (France) Saint-Étienne)
5	DF	SUI	Michael Lang (to (Germany) Borussia Mönchengladbach)
13	GK	SUI	Mirko Salvi (to Grasshoppers)
18	GK	SUI	Germano Vailati (retired)
24	MF	NOR	Mohamed Elyounoussi (to (England) Southampton)
27	MF	SUI	Neftali Manzambi (on loan to (Spain) Sporting Gijón)
39	MF	SUI	Davide Callà (to Winterthur)
—	GK	SRB	Đorđe Nikolić (on loan to Aarau, previously on loan at Thun)
—	DF	EGY	Omar Gaber (to (United States) Los Angeles, previously on loan)
—	MF	SWE	Alexander Fransson (to (Sweden) IFK Norrköping, previously on loan at Lausanne-Sport)
—	MF	SUI	Dereck Kutesa (to St. Gallen, previously on loan at Luzern)
—	FW	SUI	Cedric Itten (to St. Gallen, previously on loan)

=== Grasshoppers ===
In:

No.	Pos.	Nation	Player
4	DF	BRA	Nathan (on loan from (Brazil) Palmeiras, previously on loan at Servette)
9	FW	AUT	Marco Djuricin (from (Austria) Red Bull Salzburg, previously on loan)
15	DF	CIV	Souleyman Doumbia (from (Italy) Bari, previously on loan)
17	MF	SUI	Robin Kamber (from Vaduz)
21	FW	SUI	Shani Tarashaj (on loan from (England) Everton)
26	MF	AUT	Raphael Holzhauser (from Austria Wien)
34	DF	SUI	Allan Arigoni (from Grasshoppers U21)
36	GK	SUI	Lars Hunn (on loan from Aarau)
—	GK	SUI	Mirko Salvi (from Basel)

Out:

No.	Pos.	Nation	Player
4	DF	SRB	Milan Vilotić (to St. Gallen)
6	DF	KOS	Alban Pnishi (to (Israel) Bnei Sakhnin)
11	MF	BIH	Rifet Kapić (on loan to (Moldova) Sheriff Tiraspol)
13	DF	SWE	Emil Bergström (loan return to (Russia) Rubin Kazan)
17	MF	SVK	Michal Faško (on loan to (Germany) Eintracht Braunschweig)
18	GK	SRB	Vaso Vasic (to (Greece) Apollon Smyrnis)
19	FW	BIH	Kenan Kodro (loan return to (Germany) Mainz 05)
20	DF	AUS	Trent Sainsbury (loan return to (China) Jiangsu Suning)
27	GK	ANG	João Ngongo (released)
31	FW	ALB	Albion Avdijaj (on loan to (Hungary) Debrecen)
—	GK	SUI	Mirko Salvi (on loan to Luzern)
—	FW	SUI	Ridge Munsy (on loan to (Turkey) BB Erzurumspor, previously on loan at (Germany) Erzgebirge Aue)
—	DF	ALB	Arijan Qollaku (to Schaffhausen, previously on loan)
—	MF	SUI	Valon Fazliu (to Lugano, previously on loan at Rapperswil-Jona)
—	FW	SUI	Florian Kamberi (to (Scotland) Hibernian, previously on loan)

=== Lugano ===
In:

No.	Pos.	Nation	Player
4	DF	HUN	Ákos Kecskés (from (Italy) Atalanta, previously on loan at (Poland) Korona Kielce)
7	DF	ITA	Edoardo Masciangelo (from (Italy) Piacenza)
8	MF	SUI	Valon Fazliu (from Grasshoppers, previously on loan at Rapperswil-Jona)
13	GK	GER	Alexander Muci (from Lugano U21)
17	MF	HUN	Bálint Vécsei (from (Italy) Bologna, previously on loan)
20	MF	CRO	Petar Brlek (on loan from (Italy) Genoa, previously on loan at (Poland) Wisła Kraków)
22	MF	BRA	Emerson Crepaldi (from Lugano U21)
29	FW	SUI	Salah Azi Binous (from Team Ticino U18)
35	DF	NGA	Stanley Amuzie (from (Italy) Sampdoria, previously on loan)
46	GK	SUI	Noam Baumann (on loan from Wil)
76	GK	SUI	Lucio Soldini (from Team Ticino U18)
—	MF	ITA	Giorgio Perego (from Mendrisio-Stabio)

Out:

No.	Pos.	Nation	Player
5	DF	SRB	Vladimir Golemić (to (Italy) Crotone)
8	MF	SUI	Davide Mariani (to (Bulgaria) Levski Sofia)
12	DF	SUI	Silvano Schäppi (to Wil)
22	DF	SUI	Steve Rouiller (to Servette)
24	MF	ITA	Cristian Ledesma (released)
34	MF	SUI	Stefano Guidotti (on loan to Chiasso)
—	MF	ITA	Giorgio Perego (on loan to Mendrisio-Stabio)
—	FW	MAR	Younes Bnou Marzouk (on loan to (Malta) Sliema Wanderers, previously on loan at (Sweden) Dalkurd)
—	DF	SUI	Bruno Martignoni (to Chiasso, previously on loan)
—	MF	SUI	Andrea Padula (to Chiasso, previously on loan at (Italy) Monza)

=== Luzern ===
In:

No.	Pos.	Nation	Player
10	FW	NGA	Blessing Eleke (from (Israel) Ashdod)
14	GK	SUI	Mirko Salvi (on loan from Grasshoppers)
22	GK	SUI	Loïc Jacot (on loan from Neuchâtel Xamax)

Out:

No.	Pos.	Nation	Player
6	MF	SUI	Remo Arnold (on loan to Winterthur)
10	MF	SUI	Daniel Follonier (on loan to Servette)
14	DF	SUI	Nicolas Schindelholz (to Aarau)
21	GK	SUI	Jonas Omlin (to Basel)
22	GK	SUI	Simon Enzler (on loan to Kriens)
29	MF	SUI	Dereck Kutesa (loan return to Basel)
31	MF	KOS	Hekuran Kryeziu (to Zürich)
—	MF	SUI	Dario Ulrich (on loan to Kriens, previously on loan at Winterthur)
—	MF	SUI	João de Oliveira (to Lausanne-Sport, previously on loan at (Poland) Lechia Gdańsk)

=== Neuchâtel Xamax ===
In:

No.	Pos.	Nation	Player
9	MF	CIV	Hamed Koné (from (Kosovo) Feronikeli)
16	DF	FRA	William Le Pogam (from Servette)
18	FW	SUI	Tunahan Cicek (from Schaffhausen)
31	DF	ALB	Arbnor Fejzullahu (from (Albania) Partizani Tirana)
32	GK	SUI	Matthias Minder (from Winterthur)
46	DF	ESP	Maikel Santana (from (Spain) San Fernando)
99	FW	SUI	Kemal Ademi (from St. Gallen U21)

Out:

No.	Pos.	Nation	Player
9	MF	BRA	Bruno Mota (to (Greece) Kerkyra)
15	DF	TOG	Steve Lawson (released)
19	MF	SUI	Marco Delley (to Stade Nyonnais)
32	DF	SUI	Linus Obexer (loan return to Young Boys)
92	FW	SVN	Elvis Bratanović (to Sursee)
99	GK	SUI	Loïc Jacot (on loan to Luzern)
—	DF	SUI	Léo Farine (to Bellinzona, previously on loan at La Chaux-de-Fonds)
—	MF	BIH	Safet Alic (to Bavois, previously on loan)
—	FW	SUI	Emmanuel Mast (to Delémont, previously on loan)

=== Sion ===
In:

No.	Pos.	Nation	Player
2	DF	BRA	Raphael (from (Portugal) Boavista)
9	FW	LVA	Roberts Uldriķis (from (Latvia) Rīgas Futbola Skola)
17	MF	CMR	Alex Song (from (Russia) Rubin Kazan)
22	FW	SEN	Moussa Djitté (from (Senegal) Niarry Tally)
25	FW	FRA	Yassin Fortune (from (England) Arsenal U23)
30	DF	ALG	Ayoub Abdellaoui (from (Algeria) USM Alger)
42	GK	FRA	Anthony Maisonnial (from (France) Saint-Étienne)
84	MF	BRA	Batata (from (Brazil) Vila Nova)
90	FW	BRA	Philippe (from (Brazil) Vila Nova)

Out:

No.	Pos.	Nation	Player
4	DF	SUI	Ivan Lurati (on loan to Chiasso)
6	DF	BRA	Paulo Ricardo (on loan to (Brazil) Fluminense)
7	DF	ITA	Federico Dimarco (to (Italy) Inter Milan)
9	FW	BEL	Ilombe Mboyo (to (Belgium) Kortrijk)
15	FW	SUI	Marco Schneuwly (to Aarau)
17	FW	PER	Alexander Succar (loan return to (Peru) Sporting Cristal)
23	DF	SUI	Eray Cümart (loan return to Basel)
31	DF	MNE	Elsad Zverotić (to Aarau)
44	GK	SUI	Yanick Hofer (loan return to Wohlen)
48	MF	TUR	Salih Uçan (loan return to (Turkey) Fenerbahçe)
70	FW	BRA	Matheus Cunha (to (Germany) RB Leipzig)
—	MF	SUI	Gregory Karlen (to Thun, previously on loan)

=== St. Gallen ===
In:

No.	Pos.	Nation	Player
3	DF	TUN	Sliman Kchouk (from (Tunisia) Club Africain)
4	MF	GHA	Majeed Ashimeru (on loan from (Austria) Red Bull Salzburg, previously on loan at (Austria) Wolfsberger AC)
5	DF	ARG	Leonel Mosevich (on loan from (Argentina) Argentinos Juniors)
8	MF	ESP	Jordi Quintillà (from Puerto Rico)
13	FW	SUI	Cedric Itten (from Basel, previously on loan)
14	MF	SUI	Vincent Sierro (on loan from (Germany) SC Freiburg)
15	DF	SRB	Milan Vilotić (from Grasshoppers)
19	FW	USA	Kekuta Manneh (from (Mexico) Pachuca)
27	DF	SUI	Nias Hefti (from St. Gallen U21)
44	MF	SUI	Dereck Kutesa (from Basel, previously on loan at Luzern)
93	FW	FRA	Axel Bakayoko (on loan from (Italy) Inter Milan, previously on loan at (France) Sochaux)

Out:

No.	Pos.	Nation	Player
3	DF	TUN	Karim Haggui (released)
5	DF	GAB	Yrondu Musavu-King (loan return to (Italy) Udinese)
8	MF	ISL	Rúnar Már Sigurjónsson (loan return to Grasshoppers)
20	FW	SUI	Noah Blasucci (to (Liechtenstein) Vaduz)
22	MF	SUI	Marco Aratore (to (Russia) Ural Yekaterinburg)
23	MF	SRB	Danijel Aleksić (to (Turkey) Yeni Malatyaspor)
24	DF	SUI	Adonis Ajeti (on loan to Chiasso)
27	DF	SUI	Nias Hefti (on loan to Wil)
28	MF	COD	Nzuzi Toko (to (Saudi Arabia) Al-Fateh)
30	GK	SUI	Nico Krucker (released)
53	DF	SUI	Silvan Gönitzer (on loan to Rapperswil-Jona)
56	DF	SUI	Jasper van der Werff (to (Austria) Red Bull Salzburg)
58	DF	SUI	Cédric Gasser (on loan to Wil)

=== Thun ===
In:

No.	Pos.	Nation	Player
6	MF	SVN	Kenan Fatkič (from Chiasso)
8	MF	SUI	Gregory Karlen (from Sion, previously on loan)
10	MF	SUI	Basil Stillhart (from Wil)
22	GK	SUI	Nino Ziswiler (from Thun U21)
37	MF	LIE	Dennis Salanović (from Rapperswil-Jona)

Out:

No.	Pos.	Nation	Player
5	DF	SUI	Nicolas Bürgy (loan return to Young Boys)
13	GK	SRB	Đorđe Nikolić (loan return to Basel)
22	GK	SUI	Felix Hornung (to Breitenrain Bern)
28	MF	SUI	Robin Huser (loan return to Basel U21)
30	MF	SUI	Sandro Lauper (to Young Boys)
32	DF	SUI	Elia Alessandrini (loan return to Young Boys U21)

=== Young Boys ===
In:

No.	Pos.	Nation	Player
4	DF	GUI	Mohamed Ali Camara (from (Israel) Hapoel Ra'anana)
21	DF	SUI	Ulisses Garcia (from (Germany) Werder Bremen, previously on loan at (Germany) 1. FC Nürnberg)
30	MF	SUI	Sandro Lauper (from Thun)
51	DF	SUI	Jan Kronig (from Young Boys U21)

Out:

No.	Pos.	Nation	Player
4	DF	SUI	Marco Bürki (to (Belgium) Zulte Waregem)
24	DF	GHA	Kasim Nuhu (to (Germany) 1899 Hoffenheim)
30	GK	FRA	Alexandre Letellier (loan return to (France) Angers)
—	DF	SUI	Linus Obexer (on loan to Aarau, previously on loan at Neuchâtel Xamax)
—	MF	SUI	Kwadwo Duah (on loan to Servette, previously on loan at Winterthur)
—	MF	ALB	Taulant Seferi (on loan to Winterthur, previously on loan at Wohlen)

=== Zürich ===
In:

No.	Pos.	Nation	Player
3	DF	DEN	Andreas Maxsø (from (Turkey) Osmanlıspor)
4	DF	SUI	Becir Omeragic (from Servette U18)
12	DF	FRA	Hakim Guenouche (from (France) Nancy U19)
14	MF	SUI	Toni Domgjoni (from Zürich U21)
21	MF	SUI	Izer Aliu (from Zürich U21)
32	MF	SUI	Bledian Krasniqi (from Zürich U18)
34	DF	SUI	Ilan Sauter (from Zürich U18)
35	MF	SUI	Simon Sohm (from Zürich U18)
70	MF	KOS	Benjamin Kololli (from Lausanne-Sport)
71	MF	KOS	Hekuran Kryeziu (from Luzern)
77	MF	KOS	Lavdrim Rexhepi (from Zürich U21)
94	MF	SUI	Salim Khelifi (from (Germany) Eintracht Braunschweig)

Out:

No.	Pos.	Nation	Player
4	DF	DEN	Rasmus Thelander (to (Netherlands) Vitesse)
11	FW	GHA	Raphael Dwamena (to (Spain) Levante)
26	DF	SUI	Cédric Brunner (to (Germany) Arminia Bielefeld)
28	DF	SUI	Tobias Schättin (loan return to Winterthur)
—	GK	CAN	Yann-Alexandre Fillion (on loan to Aarau, previously on loan at (Norway) Nest-Sotra)
—	MF	CIV	Gilles Yapi Yapo (to Basel U21, previously on loan at Aarau)
