= Samuel Ballet =

Swiss footballer (born 2001)

Personal information
- Full name: Samuel Leo Beat Ballet
- Date of birth: 12 March 2001 (age 25)
- Place of birth: Bern, Switzerland
- Height: 1.80 m (5 ft 11 in)
- Position: Forward

Team information
- Current team: Amedspor
- Number: 10

Senior career*
Years	Team	Apps	(Gls)
2018–2019	Young Boys II	22	(9)
2020–2022	Young Boys	1	(1)
2020	→ FC Wil (loan)	12	(1)
2021–2022	→ FC Winterthur (loan)	45	(8)
2022–2024	FC Winterthur	37	(6)
2024–2025	Como	3	(0)
2024–2025	→ Zürich (loan)	26	(3)
2025–2026	Antalyaspor	24	(5)
2026–	Amedspor	10	(4)

International career^{‡}
2019	Switzerland U18	3	(0)
2019	Switzerland U19	2	(0)
2020	Switzerland U20	1	(0)
2026–	Switzerland	2	(0)
- * Club domestic league appearances and goals as of 20:52, 4 November 2026 (UTC) ‡ National team caps and goals as of 16 November 2026

Samuel Leo Beat Ballet (born 12 March 2001) is a Swiss professional footballer who plays as a forward for Süper Lig club Amedspor and the Switzerland national team.

== Club career ==
Ballet made his professional debut on 16 February 2020 against Lugano, replacing Saidy Janko. He scored an 89th minute game-winner in the eventual 2–1 victory.

On 28 January 2024, Ballet signed a three-and-a-half-year contract with Como in Italy. On 31 August 2024, he was loaned by Zürich, with an option to buy.

== International career ==
Ballet was born in Switzerland to a Swiss father and Cameroonian mother. He is a youth international for Switzerland.

Ballet was one of the 24 players who were called up with the Switzerland national team by head coach Murat Yakin for the 2026–27 UEFA Nations League B matches against Slovenia on 13 November and Scotland on 16 November 2026.

== Career statistics ==
As of match played 1 November 2026

Appearances and goals by club, season and competition
Club	Season	League			National cup (Note: Includes Swiss Cup, Turkish Cup)		Europe		Other		Total	
Club	Season	Division	Apps	Goals	Apps	Goals	Apps	Goals	Apps	Goals	Apps	Goals
Young Boys II	2017–18	Swiss 1. Liga	3	3	—		—		—		3	3
Young Boys II	2018–19	Swiss 1. Liga	9	0	—		—		—		9	0
Young Boys II	2019–20	Swiss 1. Liga	10	6	—		—		—		10	6
Young Boys II	Total		22	9	—		—		—		22	9
Young Boys	2019–20	Swiss Super League	1	1	0	0	—		—		1	1
Wil (loan)	2020–21	Swiss Challenge League	12	1	1	0	—		—		12	1
Winterthur (loan)	2020–21	Swiss Challenge League	13	3	2	0	—		—		15	3
Winterthur (loan)	2021–22	Swiss Challenge League	32	5	2	2	—		—		34	7
Winterthur (loan)	Total		45	8	4	2	—		—		49	10
Winterthur	2022–23	Swiss Super League	20	1	1	1	—		—		21	2
Winterthur	2023–24	Swiss Super League	17	5	2	2	—		—		19	7
Winterthur	Total		37	6	3	3	—		—		40	9
Winterthur II	2023–24	Swiss 1. Liga	4	2	—		—		—		4	2
Como	2023–24	Serie B	3	0	—		—		—		3	0
Zürich (loan)	2024–25	Swiss Super League	26	3	2	0	—		—		28	3
Antalyaspor	2025–26	Süper Lig	24	5	3	1	—		—		27	6
Amedspor	2026–27	Süper Lig	10	4	0	0	—		—		10	4
Career total			184	39	13	6	0	0	0	0	197	45

=== International ===
As of match played 16 November 2026

Appearances and goals by national team and year
National team	Year	Apps	Goals
Switzerland	2026	2	0
Total		2	0
