= Samir Ramizi =

Serbian footballer (born 1991)

Personal information
- Date of birth: 24 July 1991 (age 35)
- Place of birth: Veliki Trnovac, SR Serbia, SFR Yugoslavia
- Height: 1.82 m (6 ft 0 in)
- Position: Attacking midfielder

Team information
- Current team: YF Juventus
- Number: 22

Youth career
- –2009: Tërnoci

Senior career*
Years	Team	Apps	(Gls)
2009–2010	Drenica		
2010–2012	Drita		
2012	Stade Nyonnais	10	(2)
2012–2014	Servette	4	(0)
2013	→ Étoile Carouge (loan)	8	(6)
2013	→ Étoile Carouge (loan)	2	(2)
2014–2016	Wohlen	68	(14)
2016–2020	Xamax	124	(13)
2020–2024	Winterthur	108	(18)
2024–2025	Xamax	32	(1)
2025–	YF Juventus	27	(5)
- * Club domestic league appearances and goals as of 19 September 2026

Samir Ramizi (Serbian Cyrillic: Самир Рамизи; born 24 July 1991) is a Serbian professional footballer who plays as an attacking midfielder for Swiss Promotion League club YF Juventus.

== Career ==
=== Neuchâtel Xamax ===
On 4 June 2016, Ramizi signed a two-year contract with Swiss Challenge League club Xamax. On 23 July 2016, he made his debut in a 2–1 home win against former club Servette after coming on as a substitute at 71st minute in place of Gaëtan Karlen.

=== FC Winterthur ===
On 6 August 2020, Ramizi signed a two-year contract with Swiss Challenge League club Winterthur. On 12 September 2020, he made his debut in the 2020–21 Swiss Cup second round against Tuggen after being named in the starting line-up.

On 12 February 2024, after over three seasons at the club, his contract with Winterthur was dissolved by mutual agreement.

== Personal life ==
Ramizi is of Albanian descent.

== Career statistics ==
As of 11 February 2024

Appearances and goals by club, season and competition
Club	Season	League			Cup		Other		Total	
Club	Season	Division	Apps	Goals	Apps	Goals	Apps	Goals	Apps	Goals
Stade Nyonnais	2011–12	Swiss Challenge League	10	2	0	0	—		10	2
Servette	2012–13	Swiss Super League	4	0	0	0	1 (Note: Appearance with Servette U21)	2	5	2
Étoile Carouge (loan)	2012–13	Swiss Promotion League	8	6	0	0	—		8	6
Étoile Carouge (loan)	2013–14	Swiss Promotion League	2	2	0	0	—		2	2
Étoile Carouge (loan)	Total		10	8	0	0	—		10	8
FC Wohlen	2013–14	Swiss Challenge League	17	3	0	0	—		17	3
FC Wohlen	2014–15	Swiss Challenge League	32	9	3	0	—		35	9
FC Wohlen	2015–16	Swiss Challenge League	19	2	2	3	—		21	5
FC Wohlen	Total		68	14	5	3	—		73	17
Neuchâtel Xamax	2016–17	Swiss Challenge League	31	3	1	2	—		32	5
Neuchâtel Xamax	2017–18	Swiss Challenge League	32	7	2	1	—		34	8
Neuchâtel Xamax	2018–19	Swiss Super League	29	2	3	1	1 (Note: Appearance in 2018–19 Swiss Super League relegation play-offs)	0	33	3
Neuchâtel Xamax	2019–20	Swiss Super League	32	1	3	1	—		35	2
Neuchâtel Xamax	Total		124	13	9	5	1	0	134	18
FC Winterthur	2020–21	Swiss Challenge League	34	3	3	2	—		37	5
FC Winterthur	2021–22	Swiss Challenge League	34	10	2	0	—		36	10
FC Winterthur	2022–23	Swiss Super League	25	5	3	0	—		28	5
FC Winterthur	2023–24	Swiss Super League	15	0	3	1	—		18	1
FC Winterthur	Total		108	18	11	3	0	0	119	21
Career total			324	55	25	11	2	2	351	68

== Honour ==
Individual

- Swiss Super League Best player of the round: 2022–23 Round 1
