= Souleymane Diaby =

Souleymane Diaby may refer to:

- Souleymane Diaby (footballer, born 1987), Ivorian former football striker
- Souleymane Diaby (footballer, born 1999), Ugandan football left-back for Winterthur
