= Yann Kasaï =

Swiss footballer (born 1998)

Personal information
- Full name: Yann Aime Kasaï
- Date of birth: 14 April 1998 (age 28)
- Place of birth: Neuchâtel, Switzerland
- Height: 1.91 m (6 ft 3 in)
- Position: Forward

Team information
- Current team: Köniz
- Number: 4

Youth career
- 2005–2008: Serrières
- 2008–2012: Xamax
- 2012–2015: Sochaux
- 2015–2016: Latina
- 2016–2018: Young Boys
- 2018–2019: FC Zürich

Senior career*
Years	Team	Apps	(Gls)
2017–2018	Young Boys U21	16	(9)
2017–2018	→ Breitenrain (loan)	7	(0)
2018–2020	Zürich U21	20	(7)
2018–2020	Zürich	4	(0)
2021	Étoile Carouge	5	(1)
2021–2022	Dornbirn	14	(1)
2022	Young Boys U21	17	(3)
2022–2023	Biel-Bienne	17	(3)
2023–2024	Bulle	10	(0)
2024–2025	Bavois	16	(2)
2025–	Köniz	12	(3)

International career^{‡}
2018	Switzerland U20	2	(1)
- * Club domestic league appearances and goals as of 22 June 2025 ‡ National team caps and goals as of 21 July 2019

Yann Aime Kasaï (born 14 April 1998) is a Swiss football player who plays as forward for FC Köniz in the fourth-tier Swiss 1. Liga.

== Club career ==
On 5 December 2018, Kasaï joined FC Zürich. made his professional debut for Zürich in a 2–0 Swiss Super League loss to FC Basel on 9 December 2018.

On 13 July 2021, he signed with Dornbirn in Austria. He was released from the contract on 3 January 2022.

On 13 June 2022, Kasaï moved to Biel-Bienne on a one-season deal.

On 24 July 2023, FC Bulle announced the signing of Kasaï.

== International career ==
On 15 November 2018, Kasaï scored for Switzerland U20 against Netherland U20 (result 1–3)

== Personal life ==
Kasaï was born in Switzerland and is of Congolese descent.
