= Sayfallah Ltaief =

Tunisian footballer (born 2000)

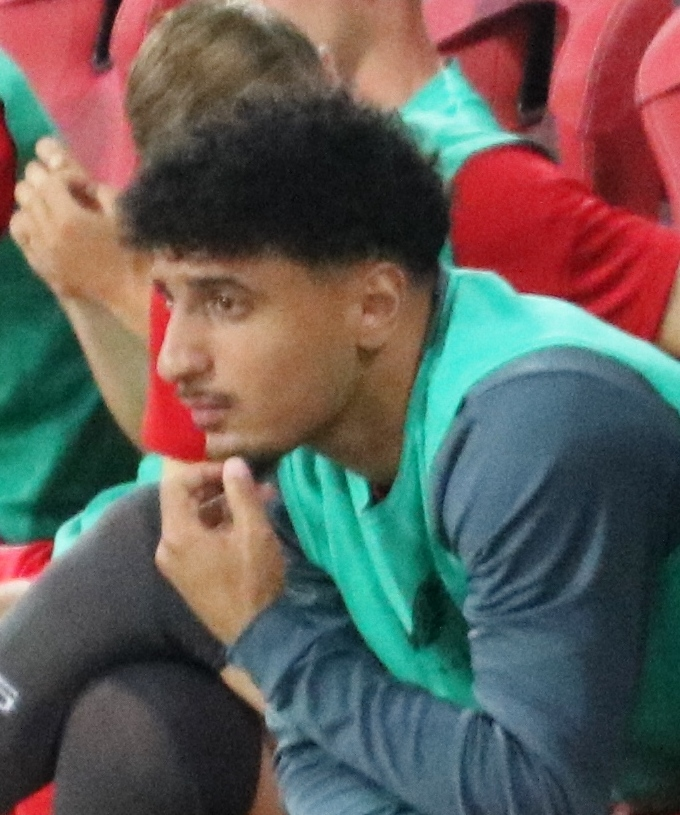
- Ltaief in 2024 with Twente

Personal information
- Date of birth: 22 April 2000 (age 26)
- Place of birth: Zürich, Switzerland
- Height: 1.78 m (5 ft 10 in)
- Position: Winger

Team information
- Current team: Cracovia
- Number: 47

Youth career
- Zürich
- 2015–2017: Kosova Zürich
- 2017–2018: Zürich
- 2018–2020: Winterthur

Senior career*
Years	Team	Apps	(Gls)
2020–2022	Winterthur	66	(8)
2022–2024	Basel	6	(0)
2022–2024	Basel U21	4	(0)
2023–2024	→ Winterthur (loan)	50	(9)
2024–	Twente	30	(1)
2025–2026	→ Sparta Rotterdam (loan)	9	(1)
2026	→ Greuther Fürth (loan)	13	(1)
2026–	Cracovia	8	(0)

International career^{‡}
2022–	Tunisia	26	(1)
- * Club domestic league appearances and goals as of 12:14, 9 November 2026 (UTC) ‡ National team caps and goals as of 20:45, 13 November 2026 (UTC)

Sayfallah Ltaief (Arabic: سَيْف الله لَطِيف; born 22 April 2000) is a professional footballer who plays as a winger for Ekstraklasa club Cracovia. Born in Switzerland, he plays for the Tunisia national team.

== Club career ==
Ltaief is a product of the youth academies of Zürich, Kosova Zürich, and Winterthur. He began his senior career in the Swiss Challenge League with Winterthur in 2020. On 9 June 2022, he transferred to Swiss Super League club Basel. He made his professional debut with Basel in a 1–1 league draw against his former club Winterthur on 16 July 2022.

On 5 December 2022, Ltaief agreed to return to Winterthur on loan for the second half of the 2022–23 season. His loan was again extended for the entirety of the 2023–24 season, as he eventually scored eight goals and six assists for Winterthur throughout the league campaign.

On 17 May 2024, it was announced that Ltaief would join Dutch side Twente on a permanent deal, signing a three-year contract set to be activated from 1 July.

On 7 August 2025, Ltaief joined Sparta Rotterdam on season-long loan. On 2 February 2026, he moved on a new loan to German club Greuther Fürth in the 2. Bundesliga.

On 20 August 2026, Ltaief signed a two-year contract with Polish club Cracovia, with an option for another year.

== International career ==
Ltaief was born in Switzerland and is of Tunisian descent. He was called up to represent the Tunisia U22s in 2022, and also had training sessions with the senior national team in preparation for the 2022 Kirin Cup. He made his debut with Tunisia as a late substitute in a 1–0 friendly win over Comoros on 22 September 2022.

== Career statistics ==
=== Club ===
As of match played 6 November 2026

Appearances and goals by club, season and competition
Club	Season	League			National cup (Note: Includes Swiss Cup, KNVB Cup, Polish Cup)		Europe		Other		Total	
Club	Season	Division	Apps	Goals	Apps	Goals	Apps	Goals	Apps	Goals	Apps	Goals
Winterthur	2019–20	Swiss Challenge League	12	2	2	0	—		—		14	2
Winterthur	2020–21	Swiss Challenge League	20	1	2	0	—		—		22	1
Winterthur	2021–22	Swiss Challenge League	34	5	2	0	—		—		36	5
Winterthur	Total		66	8	6	0	—		—		72	8
Basel	2022–23	Swiss Super League	6	0	1	0	3 (Note: Appearances in UEFA Conference League)	0	—		10	0
Basel U21	2022–23	Swiss Promotion League	4	0	—		—		—		4	0
Winterthur (loan)	2022–23	Swiss Super League	15	1	0	0	—		—		15	1
Winterthur (loan)	2023–24	Swiss Super League	35	8	5	1	—		—		40	9
Winterthur (loan)	Total		50	9	5	1	—		—		55	10
Twente	2024–25	Eredivisie	30	1	2	0	12 (Note: Two appearances in UEFA Champions League, ten appearances and one goal in UEFA Europa League)	1	0	0	44	2
Sparta Rotterdam (loan)	2025–26	Eredivisie	9	1	3	1	—		—		12	2
Greuther Fürth (loan)	2025–26	2. Bundesliga	13	1	—		—		2 (Note: Appearances in 2. Bundesliga relegation play-offs)	0	15	1
Cracovia	2026–27	Ekstraklasa	8	0	1	0	—		—		9	0
Career total			186	21	18	1	15	1	2	0	221	23

=== International ===
As of match played 13 November 2026

Appearances and goals by national team and year
National team	Year	Apps	Goals
Tunisia	2022	1	0
Tunisia	2023	4	0
Tunisia	2024	11	1
Tunisia	2025	5	0
Tunisia	2026	5	0
Total		26	1

Scores and results list Tunisia's goal tally first, score column indicates score after each Ltaief goal.

List of international goals scored by Sayfallah Ltaief
No.	Date	Venue	Opponent	Score	Result	Competition
1	14 November 2024	Loftus Versfeld Stadium, Pretoria, South Africa	Madagascar	2–1	3–2	2025 Africa Cup of Nations qualification

== Honours ==
Winterthur

- Swiss Challenge League: 2021–22
