= Pedro Teixeira (footballer) =

Swiss footballer (born 1998)

Personal information
- Full name: Daniel Pedro Martinho Teixeira
- Date of birth: 7 September 1998 (age 28)
- Place of birth: Neuchâtel, Switzerland
- Height: 1.78 m (5 ft 10 in)
- Position: Midfielder

Team information
- Current team: Bulle
- Number: 27

Youth career
- 2008–2016: Xamax

Senior career*
Years	Team	Apps	(Gls)
2016–2017	Xamax	27	(7)
2017–2020	Young Boys	0	(0)
2019	→ Rapperswil-Jona (loan)	15	(3)
2019–2020	→ Kriens (loan)	20	(0)
2020–2021	Xamax	15	(0)
2021–2022	Chiasso	31	(2)
2022–2023	Biel-Bienne	28	(2)
2023–	Bulle	11	(2)

International career^{‡}
2016	Switzerland U19	1	(0)
2017	Switzerland U20	6	(0)
- * Club domestic league appearances and goals as of 26 October 2023 ‡ National team caps and goals as of 2 October 2022

Daniel Pedro Martinho Teixeira (born 7 September 1998), better known as just Pedro Teixeira, is a Swiss professional footballer who plays as a midfielder for Bulle.

== Club career ==
Teixeira joined his local club Neuchâtel Xamax at the age of 10. After a successful debut season with Xamax in the Swiss Challenge League, Teixeira signed a 4-year contract with BSC Young Boys on 30 August 2017. Teixeira made his professional debut in a 2-1 2017–18 UEFA Europa League win over KF Skënderbeu Korçë on 7 December 2017.

He was loaned out to FC Rapperswil-Jona on 15 January 2019 for the rest of the season.

On 12 September 2019, Teixeira joined Swiss Challenge League side Kriens on a season-long loan deal.

On 19 August 2022, Teixeira moved to Biel-Bienne on a one-year contract.

== International career ==
Teixeira was born in Switzerland to Portuguese parents, and is a one-time international for the Switzerland U19s, and most recently represented the Switzerland U20s.
