= Granit Lekaj =

Swiss footballer (born 1990)

Personal information
- Date of birth: 23 February 1990 (age 36)
- Place of birth: Pristina, SFR Yugoslavia
- Height: 1.86 m (6 ft 1 in)
- Position: Centre-back

Team information
- Current team: Young Fellows Juventus
- Number: 23

Youth career
- FC Pfäffikon
- 2004–2008: Winterthur

Senior career*
Years	Team	Apps	(Gls)
2008–2010	Winterthur U21	46	(2)
2010–2011	Winterthur	9	(0)
2011–2015	Wil	121	(2)
2015–2017	Schaffhausen	56	(3)
2017–2018	Wil	27	(2)
2018–2025	Winterthur	191	(5)
2025–	Young Fellows Juventus	14	(1)
- * Club domestic league appearances and goals as of 22 November 2025

Granit Lekaj (born 23 February 1990) is a Swiss-Kosovan professional footballer who plays as a centre-back for Swiss 1. Liga Classic club Young Fellows Juventus.

== Career ==
Lekaj is a product of the youth academies of FC Pfäffikon and Winterthur, beginning his senior career with the reserves of the latter in 2008, before promoting to their senior team in 2010. He transferred to Wil on 20 July 2011. After four years at Wil and 121 appearances and 2 goals, he moved to Schaffhausen on 30 July 2015. He returned to Wil on 21 July 2017.

On 5 June 2018, Lekaj returned to his first club Winterthur on 5 June 2018. He became the captain of the club on 9 October 2021. He captained the team win the 2021–22 Swiss Challenge League and earn promotion into the Swiss Super League for the 2022–23 season.

== Personal life ==
Born in Pristina, present day Kosovo, Lekaj moved to Switzerland at a young age.

== Honours ==
Winterthur

- Swiss Challenge League: 2021–22
