= Adrian Gantenbein =

Swiss footballer (born 2001)

Personal information
- Full name: Adrian Tobias Gantenbein
- Date of birth: 18 April 2001 (age 25)
- Place of birth: Winterthur, Switzerland
- Height: 1.83 m (6 ft 0 in)
- Position: Right-back

Team information
- Current team: Schalke 04
- Number: 17

Youth career
- 2009–2019: Winterthur

Senior career*
Years	Team	Apps	(Gls)
2019–2022	Winterthur II	17	(0)
2020–2024	Winterthur	107	(4)
2024–	Schalke 04	40	(2)
2026–	Schalke 04 II	2	(0)

International career
2021	Switzerland U21	6	(0)
- * Club domestic league appearances and goals as of 13 October 2026

Adrian Tobias Gantenbein (born 18 April 2001) is a Swiss professional footballer who plays as a right-back for Bundesliga club Schalke 04.

== Club career ==
=== Winterthur ===
Gantenbein is a youth product of Winterthur since 2009, and began his senior career with the club in the Swiss Challenge League in 2020. He helped Winterthur win the 2021–22 Swiss Challenge League and earn promotion into the Swiss Super League. He made his professional debut with Winterthur in a 4–1 Swiss Super League loss to FC Lugano on 31 July 2022.

=== Schalke 04 ===
On 27 May 2024, Schalke 04 announced that they had signed Gantenbein until 30 June 2028.

== International career ==
Gantenbein represented the Switzerland U21s in 2021.

== Career statistics ==
As of match played 11 October 2026

Appearances and goals by club, season and competition
Club	Season	League			Cup (Note: Includes Swiss Cup, DFB-Pokal)		Total	
Club	Season	Division	Apps	Goals	Apps	Goals	Apps	Goals
Winterthur II	2019–20	Swiss 1. Liga	11	0	—		11	0
Winterthur II	2020–21	Swiss 1. Liga	4	0	—		4	0
Winterthur II	2021–22	Swiss 1. Liga	2	0	—		2	0
Winterthur II	Total		17	0	—		17	0
Winterthur	2019–20	Swiss Challenge League	2	0	1	0	3	0
Winterthur	2020–21	Swiss Challenge League	31	1	3	0	34	1
Winterthur	2021–22	Swiss Challenge League	19	0	1	0	20	0
Winterthur	2022–23	Swiss Super League	23	0	2	0	25	0
Winterthur	2023–24	Swiss Super League	32	3	5	0	37	3
Winterthur	Total		107	4	12	0	119	4
Schalke 04	2024–25	2. Bundesliga	20	1	0	0	20	1
Schalke 04	2025–26	2. Bundesliga	19	0	2	0	21	0
Schalke 04	2026–27	Bundesliga	1	1	0	0	1	1
Schalke 04	Total		40	2	2	0	42	2
Schalke 04 II	2025–26	Regionalliga West	1	0	—		1	0
Schalke 04 II	2026–27	Regionalliga West	1	0	—		1	0
Schalke 04 II	Total		2	0	—		2	0
Career total			166	6	14	0	180	6

== Honours ==
Winterthur

- Swiss Challenge League: 2021–22

Schalke 04

- 2. Bundesliga: 2025–26
