= Hekuran Kryeziu =

Swiss-Kosovan footballer (born 1993)

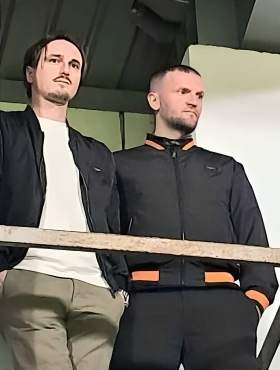
- Hekuran Kryeziu, 2026

Personal information
- Date of birth: 12 February 1993 (age 33)
- Place of birth: Luzern, Switzerland
- Height: 1.79 m (5 ft 10 in)
- Position: Midfielder

Team information
- Current team: Kosovo U21 (manager)

Youth career
- 2000–2004: Küssnacht a/R
- 2004–2011: Luzern

Senior career*
Years	Team	Apps	(Gls)
2011–2013	Luzern U21	28	(1)
2011–2018	Luzern	131	(3)
2014–2015	→ Vaduz (loan)	25	(0)
2018–2021	Zürich	68	(2)
2022–2023	Winterthur	23	(0)

International career
2010	Switzerland U17	2	(0)
2010–2011	Switzerland U18	8	(0)
2011–2012	Switzerland U19	11	(0)
2012–2013	Switzerland U20	9	(0)
2013	Switzerland U21	1	(0)
2015–2023	Kosovo	30	(0)

Managerial career
- 2025: Kosovo U21 (assistant)
- 2025–: Kosovo U21
- * Club domestic league appearances and goals

Hekuran Kryeziu (born 12 February 1993) is a Kosovan football manager and former player who is the manager of the Kosovo national under-21 team.

Kryeziu began his youth career with Küssnacht a/R before joining Luzern’s youth system. He progressed to the senior level with Luzern, making 131 appearances and scoring 3 goals for the first team between 2011 and 2018. During his time at the club, he also played for Luzern U21 and spent a loan spell at FC Vaduz. Kryeziu later played for Zürich and Winterthur before retiring from professional playing.

At international level, he represented various youth teams of Switzerland before switching allegiance to the Kosovo national team, earning 30 caps between 2015 and 2023.

In 2025, he served as assistant manager of the Kosovo U21 team before being appointed head coach of the side later that year.

== Club career ==
=== Zürich ===
On 31 May 2018, Kryeziu signed a three-year contract with Swiss Super League club Zürich and this transfer would become legally effective in July 2018. On 22 July 2018, he made his debut in a 2–1 home win against Thun after being named in the starting line-up.

=== Winterthur ===
Kryeziu had a trial at Swiss Super League club Winterthur in July 2022, and signed a two-year contract with the club for an undisclosed fee the following month. On 13 August 2022, he made his debut with second team in a 0–0 home draw against Gossau after being named in the starting line-up, while his first team debut came fifteen days later in a 1–5 home defeat against Young Boys after coming on as a substitute at 46th minute in place of Eris Abedini.

== International career ==
From 2010, until 2013, Kryeziu has been part of Switzerland at youth international level, respectively has been part of the U17, U18, U19, U20 and U21 teams and he with these teams played 31 matches. On 10 November 2015, he received a call-up from Kosovo for a friendly match against Albania, and made his debut after coming on as a substitute at 46th minute in place of Eroll Zejnullahu.

== Personal life ==
Kryeziu was born in Luzern, Switzerland from Kosovo Albanian parents from Gjilan.

== Career statistics ==
=== Club ===
Appearances and goals by club, season and competition
Club	Season	League			Cup		Continental		Other		Total	
Club	Season	Division	Apps	Goals	Apps	Goals	Apps	Goals	Apps	Goals	Apps	Goals
Luzern	2010–11	Swiss Super League	1	0	0	0	—		10 (Note: Appearance with Luzern U21)	0	11	0
Luzern	2011–12	Swiss Super League	16	0	4	0	—		10	0	30	0
Luzern	2012–13	Swiss Super League	17	0	0	0	1	0	5	0	23	0
Luzern	2013–14	Swiss Super League	10	0	0	0	—		3	1	13	0
Luzern	2015–16	Swiss Super League	27	1	3	0	—		—		30	1
Luzern	2016–17	Swiss Super League	32	2	5	0	1	0	—		30	2
Luzern	2017–18	Swiss Super League	28	0	3	0	1	0	—		31	0
Luzern	Total		131	3	15	0	3	0	28	1	168	3
Vaduz (loan)	2014–15	Swiss Super League	25	0	3	0	2	0	—		30	0
Zürich	2018–19	Swiss Super League	28	2	3	0	5	0	—		36	2
Zürich	2019–20	Swiss Super League	13	0	0	0	—		—		13	0
Zürich	2020–21	Swiss Super League	27	0	1	0	—		—		28	0
Zürich	Total		68	2	4	0	5	0	—		77	2
Winterthur	2022–23	Swiss Super League	23	0	0	0	—		2 (Note: Appearance with Winterthur U21)	0	25	0
Career total			225	5	22	0	10	0	30	1	287	6

=== International ===
Appearances and goals by national team and year
National team	Year	Apps	Goals
Kosovo
Kosovo	2015	1	0
Kosovo	2016	4	0
Kosovo	2017	6	0
Kosovo	2018	7	0
Kosovo	2019	1	0
Kosovo	2020	4	0
Kosovo	2021	5	0
Kosovo	2022	0	0
Kosovo	2023	2	0
Total		30	0
