= Matteo Di Giusto =

Swiss footballer (born 2000)

Personal information
- Date of birth: 18 August 2000 (age 26)
- Place of birth: Wetzikon, Switzerland
- Height: 1.68 m (5 ft 6 in)
- Position: Forward

Team information
- Current team: FC Luzern
- Number: 11

Youth career
- –2010: FC Wagen
- 2011–2014: Wettingen
- 2014–2015: Baden
- 2015–2019: Zürich
- 2018–2019: → SC Freiburg (loan)

Senior career*
| Years | Team | Apps | (Gls) |
| 2018–2019 | Zürich II | 18 | (3) |
| 2019–2020 | Zürich | 1 | (0) |
| 2020–2022 | Vaduz | 60 | (10) |
| 2022–2025 | Winterthur | 108 | (20) |
| 2025– | Luzern | 47 | (15) |

International career^{‡}
| 2015–2016 | Switzerland U16 | 5 | (2) |
| 2016–2017 | Switzerland U17 | 2 | (1) |
| 2019 | Switzerland U20 | 1 | (0) |
| 2021– | Switzerland U21 | 5 | (0) |
- * Club domestic league appearances and goals as of 28 September 2026 ‡ National team caps and goals as of 24 September 2022

Matteo Di Giusto (born 18 August 2000) is a Swiss professional footballer who plays as a forward for FC Luzern.

== Club career ==
On 7 July 2022, Di Giusto signed a four-year contract with Winterthur.

On 21 July 2025, he transferred to Swiss Super League rivals FC Luzern, signing a contract until 2028.
