= Elia Alessandrini =

Swiss footballer (1997–2022)

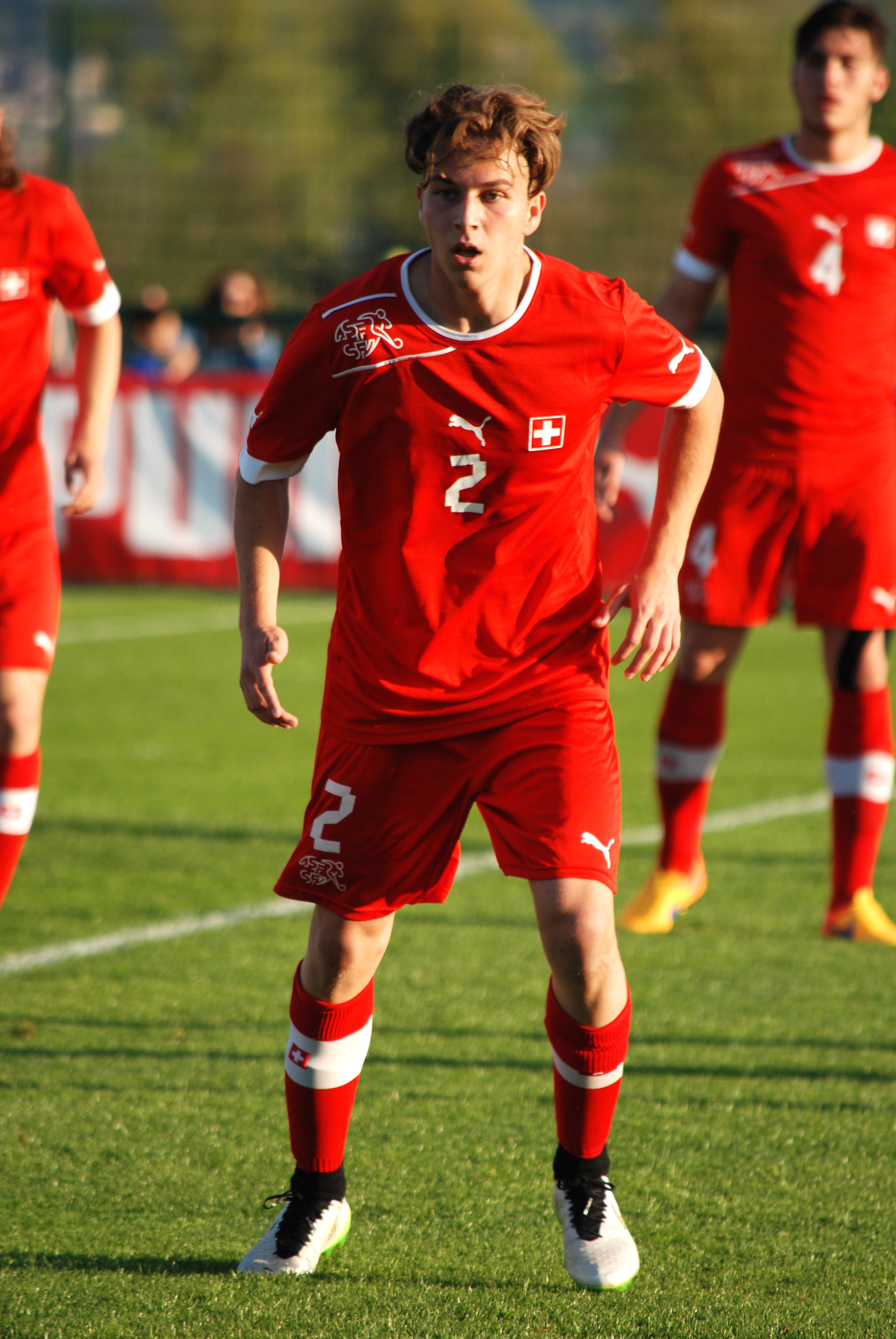
- Alessandrini in 2015

Personal information
- Date of birth: 3 March 1997
- Place of birth: Bern, Switzerland
- Date of death: 16 December 2022 (aged 25)
- Place of death: Muscat, Oman
- Height: 1.77 m (5 ft 10 in)
- Position: Centre-back

Youth career
- 2003–2008: FC Schoenbuehl
- 2008–2015: Young Boys

Senior career*
| Years | Team | Apps | (Gls) |
| 2015–2017 | Young Boys U21 | 38 | (2) |
| 2016–2020 | Young Boys | 0 | (0) |
| 2017–2018 | →Thun U21 (loan) | 5 | (0) |
| 2017–2018 | →Thun (loan) | 1 | (0) |
| 2018–2019 | →Chiasso (loan) | 25 | (2) |
| 2019–2020 | →Kriens (loan) | 20 | (0) |
| 2020–2022 | Kriens | 34 | (0) |
| 2022 | Stade Lausanne Ouchy | 5 | (0) |

International career
| 2012 | Switzerland U15 | 6 | (0) |
| 2012 | Switzerland U16 | 2 | (0) |
| 2015 | Switzerland U18 | 1 | (0) |
| 2015–2016 | Switzerland U19 | 7 | (0) |
| 2016–2017 | Switzerland U20 | 4 | (0) |
- * Club domestic league appearances and goals

Elia Alessandrini (3 March 1997 – 16 December 2022) was a Swiss professional footballer who played as a centre-back.

== Club career ==
Alessandrini began playing football at his local club Schoenbuehl in Bern, Switzerland, at the age of 6, before joining the youth academy of Young Boys in 2008, where he subsequently worked his way up their youth levels. He gained national attention in 2012 as a ball boy in a match between the national teams of Switzerland and Argentina, when he snuck up on Lionel Messi to get a handshake. He was captain of the Young Boys' U21s for the 2016–17 season. In the 2017–18 season, he joined Thun in the Swiss Super League on loan and made his professional debut as a late substitute in a 4–0 win over his parent club Young Boys on 9 August 2017. In the summer of 2018, he joined Chiasso on loan in the Swiss Challenge League. He joined SC Kriens on loan on 27 July 2019, and eventually joined them on a permanent basis and became their captain. Hampered by injuries, he transferred to Stade Lausanne Ouchy on 6 July 2022.

== International career ==
Alessandrini played as a youth international for Switzerland. He first represented the Switzerland U15s in 2012. He was part of the Switzerland U19s at the 2016 UEFA European Under-19 Championship. He last played for the Switzerland U20s in 2017.

== Personal life and death ==
Born in Bern on 3 March 1997, Alessandrini was a Swiss national of Italian descent through a grandfather from Abruzzo, Italy.

Alessandrini died on 16 December 2022, near Muscat, Oman, while on vacation with his partner; he reportedly drowned in a swimming pool hours before his flight was scheduled to return to Switzerland. As of 17 December 2022, the exact cause of death has not been revealed.
