= Remo Arnold =

Swiss footballer (born 1997)

Personal information
- Date of birth: 17 January 1997 (age 29)
- Place of birth: Schlierbach, Switzerland
- Height: 1.90 m (6 ft 3 in)
- Position: Midfielder

Team information
- Current team: Winterthur
- Number: 16

Youth career
- 2005–2009: FC Knutwil
- 2009–2014: FC Luzern

Senior career*
Years	Team	Apps	(Gls)
2015–2020	Luzern	13	(0)
2018–2019	→ Winterthur (loan)	34	(1)
2020–	Winterthur	190	(7)

International career
2012	Switzerland U16	5	(0)
2013–2014	Switzerland U17	11	(0)
2014–2015	Switzerland U18	9	(1)
2015–2016	Switzerland U19	10	(0)
2016–2018	Switzerland U20	5	(0)
2017	Switzerland U21	1	(0)
- * Club domestic league appearances and goals as of 28 September 2026

Remo Arnold (born 17 January 1997) is a Swiss footballer who plays for FC Winterthur in the Swiss Super League which is the first division of Swiss Federation Football.
