= Dion Kacuri =

Kosovar footballer (born 2004)

Personal information
- Date of birth: 11 February 2004 (age 22)
- Place of birth: Baden, Switzerland
- Height: 1.88 m (6 ft 2 in)
- Position: Midfielder

Team information
- Current team: Austria Lustenau (on loan from Basel)
- Number: 8

Youth career
- 2013–2017: YF Juventus
- 2017–2020: Grasshoppers

Senior career*
Years	Team	Apps	(Gls)
2020–2023	Grasshoppers U21	26	(7)
2021–2024	Grasshoppers	28	(1)
2024–	Basel	18	(0)
2024–2025	→ Yverdon-Sport (loan)	16	(0)
2025–2026	→ Basel U21	9	(3)
2026–	→ Austria Lustenau (loan)	7	(1)

International career^{‡}
2021–2022	Switzerland U18	4	(1)
2022	Switzerland U19	3	(0)
2024	Switzerland U20	5	(1)
2023–2026	Switzerland U21	8	(1)
2026–	Kosovo	3	(0)
- * Club domestic league appearances and goals as of 8 August 2026 ‡ National team caps and goals as of 16:16, 18 November 2026 (UTC)

Dion Kacuri (Albanian: Dion Kaçuri; born 11 February 2004) is a professional footballer who plays as a midfielder for Austrian Bundesliga club Austria Lustenau, on loan from Swiss Super League club Basel. Born in Switzerland, he represented that nation at youth international levels but in 2026 switched to play for Kosovo national team.

== Club career ==
Kacuri made his professional debut for Grasshopper in a 3–1 Swiss Super League win over Sion on 31 October 2021. He signed a professional contract with Grasshopper on 12 January 2022, keeping him at the club until 2025. On 4 September 2022, he was nominated in the starting lineup for the first time and also shot his first goal in an official match, the opening goal in a 3–0 victory over Winterthur.

On 7 February 2024, Kacuri signed a contract with Basel until the summer of 2028. In his first half season in Basel, he made twelve appearances and even started in four. In his first ever start, he supplied the assist for the final score of 2–0 against Yverdon-Sport.

On 12 July 2024, he was loaned to Yverdon-Sport for the season.

In July 2026, Kacuri moved on loan to Austria Lustenau in the Austrian Bundesliga, with an option to buy.

== International career ==
From 2021, until 2026, he has been part of Switzerland at youth international level, respectively has been part of the U18, U19, U20, and U21 teams, and he with these teams played 20 matches and scored three goals.

On 28 August 2026, Kacuri in an interview for Sky Sport Austria expressed his desire to represent the Kosovo national team, describing it as a dream, while revealing that he had not yet been contacted by the national team, despite Kosovo assistant coach Robert Ibertsberger having been present at one of his matches. On 18 September 2026, Kacuri received a call-up from Kosovo for the 2026–27 UEFA Nations League matches against the Republic of Ireland, Austria (twice), and Israel.
