= Thibault Corbaz =

Swiss footballer (born 1994)

Personal information
- Date of birth: 7 January 1994 (age 32)
- Place of birth: Morges, Switzerland
- Height: 1.77 m (5 ft 10 in)
- Position: Midfielder

Youth career
- 2002–2004: FC Colombier-Pampigny
- 2004–2007: FC Pied du Jura
- 2007–2009: Lausanne-Sport
- 2009–2012: Basel

Senior career*
Years	Team	Apps	(Gls)
2012–2014	Basel U21	52	(10)
2013–2014	Basel	0	(0)
2014	→ Biel-Bienne (loan)	13	(0)
2014–2016	Biel-Bienne	38	(3)
2016–2021	Neuchâtel Xamax	132	(8)
2021–2024	Winterthur	79	(3)

International career
2009	Switzerland U15	1	(0)
2009–2010	Switzerland U16	6	(3)
2010–2011	Switzerland U17	9	(0)
2011–2012	Switzerland U18	9	(1)
2012–2013	Switzerland U19	13	(2)
2013	Switzerland U20	6	(0)
2014	Switzerland U21	1	(0)
- * Club domestic league appearances and goals as of 27 May 2024

Thibault Corbaz (born 7 January 1994) is a Swiss footballer who plays as a midfielder. He previously played for FC Basel, though not for their first team, and spent two-and-a-half seasons with FC Biel-Bienne, until that club folded in 2016. He joined Xamax, who were then playing in the Challenge League, and helped them gain promotion to the Super League in 2018. He moved to Winterthur in 2021.

He represented Switzerland internationally at all age-group levels from under-15 to under-21.

== Life and career ==
Corbaz was born in Morges and raised in nearby Vullierens. As an eight-year-old, he joined a local club, FC Colombier-Pampigny, which later merged with another to form FC Pied du Jura; his father, Charles, was involved with the junior levels of the club. By twelve, he had attracted the attention of FC Lausanne-Sport, the club his parents supported – they first met on the terraces – and continued his development there. He was part of the Lausanne team that won the national title at under-14 level, and in June 2009, his parents agreed to let the shy, introverted 15-year-old leave home to join the youth academy of FC Basel, Switzerland's top club.

=== FC Basel ===
Within a month of joining Basel, he was chosen best player at the Swiss U16 Cup international tournament at Bad Ragaz; his team finished as runners-up to VfB Stuttgart. He played regularly for the under-16 Basel team that won their group in the national championship, and crossed for one of the goals as his team beat FC Sion, the winner of the other group, 4–2 in the final to secure the overall title. He moved up to the under-18s in 2010–11, and became a regular the following season, as well as representing Basel in the 2011–12 NextGen Series. His hat-trick in a 4–0 win against Neuchâtel Xamax put Basel U18 eight points clear going into the winter break.

In the second half of the 2011–12 season, Corbaz began playing for FC Basel II, an under-21 side that competed in the 1. Liga (the third tier of Swiss football). As well as making 12 league appearances, he was a member of the team that reached the final of the Bellinzona youth tournament, losing in the final to Boca Juniors. Because he was away on international duty, he missed the league win that confirmed Basel II would finish high enough to be placed in the 1. Liga Promotion, the new third tier, when the Swiss league system was reorganised at the end of the season.

An early-season injury did not prevent Corbaz playing in 26 of the 30 league matches and scoring 7 goals. His team were top at the winter break, but finished the season in the second place, level on points with the title-winners, FC Schaffhausen, but with a worse goal difference, despite a 5–1 win in the final fixture.

Corbaz was one of a number of development players to train with the first team during 2013–14 pre-season – coach Murat Yakin said he was keen to get to know the youngsters better – but it was expected that those not already in possession of a professional contract would return to the development teams once the season started. This was the case for Corbaz, who remained with the U21s and played 14 matches by the mid-season break.

=== FC Biel-Bienne ===
On 17 January 2014, Corbaz joined Challenge League club FC Biel-Bienne on loan until the end of the season. He made his debut on 1 February, in the starting eleven for the visit to FC Schaffhausen; he played 85 minutes, and his team lost 3–2. He finished the season on 13 appearances without scoring.

Corbaz completed a permanent move to Biel-Bienne on 1 July for an undisclosed fee. He made his second debut on 20 July in a league game against Servette, playing 78 minutes as his team lost 2–1, and his first Swiss Cup appearance a month later in a 1–0 win against Union Sportive Terre Sainte. He missed a significant portion of the season through injury. A damaged right foot kept him out for a few weeks in October, and an operation on his right knee, which was damaged in training, meant he appeared in only five matches in the second half of the campaign. His team were saved from relegation only because Servette failed to secure a licence for the coming season so were administratively demoted.

Corbaz missed several weeks of the season because of military service commitments – he thought shooting was interesting but was less keen on cleaning his weapon afterwards, and found it difficult to adjust to rising at 5:30 and spending long hours on his feet. He returned to the team after the winter break to find the club's financial and organisational difficulties increasing. He played his last match for Biel-Bienne on 21 April 2016; like his first, it was a defeat away to FC Schaffhausen, but this time by six goals to one, and marred by the head coach hitting a member of his staff in the face. Having already suffered several points deductions for breaches of licensing rules, the club announced its withdrawal from the league the next day. A few days later, its licence was revoked.

=== Neuchâtel Xamax ===
Out of contract at the end of the season, so with no need to take legal measures to extract himself from the failed club, Corbaz signed for two years plus the option of a third with Neuchâtel Xamax, newly promoted to the Challenge League. Interviewed after signing, he said his priority had been to choose a stable, well-run club. He started the first 23 matches of the Challenge League season, but in March 2017 underwent an operation on an inguinal hernia that was expected to keep him out for at least six weeks. He returned to the team for the last two matches of the season, in which Xamax finished a distant second to FC Zürich.

Corbaz scored the first goal of the 2017–18 Swiss Challenge League season after 22 minutes of Xamax's 2–1 win against Aarau on 21 July, and in early December, having entered the match as a substitute, he scored a 95th-minute winner away to second-placed Servette that extended Xamax's lead at the top of the table to eight points. At the end of the month, he signed a two-year contract extension. He finished the season with five goals from 31 (of a possible 36) Challenge League appearances, and, according to a profile in 24 heures, was a major player as Xamax were promoted to the Super League for 2018–19 with 85 points, equalling the record set the previous season by FC Zürich.

Corbaz made his Super League debut on 21 July 2018, the opening day of the 2018–19 season, replacing Gaëtan Karlen after 68 minutes of the 2–0 win away to Luzern.

=== Winterthur ===
On 10 July 2021, he signed with Winterthur.

=== International career ===
Corbaz represented Switzerland at all age-group levels, from under-15 to under-21.

== Career statistics ==
As of match played 21 July 2018

Appearances and goals by club, season and competition
Club	Season	League			Swiss Cup		Other		Total	
Club	Season	Division	Apps	Goals	Apps	Goals	Apps	Goals	Apps	Goals
Basel II	2011–12	1. Liga	12	0	—		—		12	0
Basel II	2012–13	Promotion League	26	7	—		—		26	7
Basel II	2013–14	Promotion League	14	3	—		—		14	3
Basel II	Total		52	10	—		—		52	10
Biel-Bienne (loan)	2013–14	Challenge League	13	0	—		—		13	0
Biel-Bienne	2014–15	Challenge League	18	2	1	0	—		19	2
Biel-Bienne	2015–16	Challenge League	20	1	1	0	—		21	1
Biel-Bienne	Total		51	3	2	0	—		53	3
Neuchâtel Xamax	2016–17	Challenge League	25	5	2	0	—		27	5
Neuchâtel Xamax	2017–18	Challenge League	31	2	1	0	—		32	2
Neuchâtel Xamax	2018–19	Super League	1	0	0	0	—		1	0
Neuchâtel Xamax	Total		57	7	3	0	—		60	7
Career total			160	20	5	0	—		165	20
