= Souleymane Diaby (footballer, born 1999) =

Ugandan footballer (born 1999)

Personal information
- Date of birth: 8 October 1999 (age 27)
- Place of birth: Divo, Ivory Coast
- Height: 1.73 m (5 ft 8 in)
- Position: Left-back

Team information
- Current team: Winterthur
- Number: 18

Senior career*
Years	Team	Apps	(Gls)
2016–2017	Bingerville		
2017	Denguélé		
2017–2021	Gagnoa		
2021–	Winterthur	132	(2)

International career^{‡}
2013	Ivory Coast U17	2	(0)
2017	Ivory Coast U20	2	(0)
2026–	Uganda	1	(0)
- * Club domestic league appearances and goals as of 28 September 2026 ‡ National team caps and goals as of 5 October 2026

Souleymane Diaby (born 8 October 1999) is a professional footballer who plays as a left-back for Swiss Challenge League club Winterthur. Born in Ivory Coast, he plays for the Uganda national team.

== Club career ==
Diaby began his senior career in the Ivory Coast with Bingerville, and moved to Denguélé briefly in 2017. From 2017 to 2021, he played with Gagnoa. On 3 July 2021, he moved to the Swiss club Winterthur. He helped Winterthur win the 2021–22 Swiss Challenge League, and earned promotion into the Swiss Super League. He extended his contract with Winterthur on 28 July 2022 for three more years. He made his professional debut with Winterthur in a 2–0 Swiss Super League loss to St. Gallen on 23 June 2022.

== International career ==
Diaby is a youth international for Ivory Coast, having played for the Ivory Coast U17s and U20s. He was part of the Ivory Coast A' national team squad at the 2018 African Nations Championship, but was not fielded. In March 2021, Diaby received a call-up to the senior Ivory Coast senior national team for the first time.

Since Federation of Uganda Football Associations maintains that Diaby's maternal grandfather was born in Masaka, he made his debut for the Uganda national team on 5 October 2026.

== Honours ==
Winterthur

- Swiss Challenge League: 2021–22

Individual

- Toulon Tournament Best XI: 2017
