= Sliman Kchouk =

Tunisian footballer

Personal information
- Date of birth: 7 May 1994 (age 32)
- Place of birth: Bizerte, Tunisia
- Height: 1.82 m (6 ft 0 in)
- Position: Left back

Team information
- Current team: Stade Tunisien

Senior career*
Years	Team	Apps	(Gls)
2011–2017	CA Bizertin	75	(1)
2017–2018	Club Africain	19	(0)
2018–2020	St. Gallen	5	(0)
2020–	Stade Tunisien	18	(0)

International career^{‡}
2017–	Tunisia	1	(0)
- * Club domestic league appearances and goals as of 19 May 2021 ‡ National team caps and goals as of 12:09, 27 September 2018 (UTC)

Sliman Kchouk (born 7 May 1994) is a Tunisian international footballer who plays for Stade Tunisien as a left back.

== Career ==
Born in Bizerte, Kchouk has played for CA Bizertin, Club Africain and FC St. Gallen. In July 2019 he was accused of racially abusing opposition player Jordi Osei-Tutu in a friendly match.

He made his international debut in 2017, and was named in the squad for the 2017 Africa Cup of Nations.
