= Tobias Schättin =

Swiss footballer (born 1997)

Personal information
- Full name: Tobias Felix Schättin
- Date of birth: 5 June 1997 (age 29)
- Place of birth: Zürich, Switzerland
- Height: 1.85 m (6 ft 1 in)
- Position: Leftback

Team information
- Current team: Anorthosis Famagusta
- Number: 33

Youth career
- 2008: SC Veltheim
- 2008–2016: Winterthur

Senior career*
Years	Team	Apps	(Gls)
2016–2020	Winterthur	105	(2)
2018	→ Zürich (loan)	4	(0)
2020–2021	Zürich	6	(0)
2021–2025	Winterthur	92	(4)
2025–	Anorthosis Famagusta	18	(0)

International career^{‡}
2012	Switzerland U15	6	(0)
2012–2013	Switzerland U16	9	(0)
2013–2014	Switzerland U17	12	(0)
2015–2016	Switzerland U19	3	(1)
2016–2018	Switzerland U20	9	(2)
2016	Switzerland U21	2	(0)
- * Club domestic league appearances and goals as of 14 June 2026 ‡ National team caps and goals as of 05:11, 19 June 2021 (UTC)

Tobias Felix Schättin (born 5 June 1997) is a Swiss footballer who plays as a leftback for Cypriot club Anorthosis Famagusta.

== Club career ==
Schättin spent his whole junior career at the FC Winterthur youth academy, and made 44 appearances for the first team. On 12 March 2018, Schättin signed with FC Zürich in the Swiss Super League, on loan from Winterthur with an option to buy. He made his professional debut for Zurich in a Swiss Super League 1–1 tie with FC Sion on 31 March 2018. He returned to Winterthur for the following seasons. On 26 August 2020 he signed a two-year contract with FC Zürich.

On 24 June 2021, he returned to Winterthur.

== International career ==
Schättin is a former youth international for Switzerland, having represented them at all youth levels.
