= Eris Abedini =

Footballer (born 1998)

Personal information
- Date of birth: 29 August 1998 (age 28)
- Place of birth: Sorengo, Switzerland
- Height: 1.90 m (6 ft 3 in)
- Position: Midfielder

Team information
- Current team: Neuchâtel Xamax
- Number: 4

Youth career
- 2006–2011: AC Malcantone
- 2011–2012: Lugano
- 2012: AC Malcantone
- 2012–2016: Lugano

Senior career*
Years	Team	Apps	(Gls)
2016–2018	Lugano U21	5	(2)
2016–2017	→ Chiasso (loan)	21	(0)
2017–2020	Lugano	9	(0)
2017–2018	→ Chiasso (loan)	24	(0)
2019	→ Winterthur (loan)	11	(0)
2019–2020	→ Wil (loan)	35	(1)
2020–2021	Granada B	7	(0)
2021–2022	Chiasso	8	(0)
2022–2023	Winterthur	55	(1)
2023–2024	Neuchâtel Xamax	21	(0)
2024–2025	Ballkani	20	(1)
2025–	Neuchâtel Xamax	39	(2)

International career^{‡}
2017	Switzerland U19	1	(0)
2017–2018	Switzerland U20	5	(0)
2019–2020	Kosovo U21	7	(1)
2022	Kosovo	1	(0)
- * Club domestic league appearances and goals as of 28 September 2026 ‡ National team caps and goals as of 5 June 2023

Eris Abedini (born 29 August 1998) is a professional footballer who plays as a midfielder for Neuchâtel Xamax. Born in Switzerland, he plays for the Kosovo national team.

== Club career ==
=== Early career ===
A youth product of Lugano, Abedini begun his senior career with a two-year loan at Chiasso. Abedini made his professional debut for Lugano in a 1–1 Swiss Super League tie with Zürich on 19 May 2018.

Abedini was loaned out to Winterthur on 4 January 2019, for the rest of the season. On 16 July 2019 Abedini joined Wil on a contract until June 2021.

=== Granada ===
On 3 October 2020, Abedini joined Segunda División B side Granada B, on a one-year contract with an option for two more season. On 8 November 2020, he was called up from first team for the league match against Real Sociedad at away, becoming the first ever Kosovan to make it to club's first team. He was an unused substitute in Granada defeat 2–0 at Anoeta Stadium.

=== Winterthur ===
On 29 December 2021, he signed a contract with Winterthur until the summer of 2023.

== International career ==
Abedini was born in Switzerland and is of Kosovan Albanian descent. Abedini was a youth international for Switzerland before switching allegiance to Kosovo. He debuted with the senior Kosovo national team in a friendly 2–2 tie with Armenia on 16 November 2022.
