= Varol Tasar =

German footballer

Personal information
- Full name: Varol Salman Tasar
- Date of birth: 4 October 1996 (age 30)
- Place of birth: Waldshut-Tiengen, Germany
- Height: 1.74 m (5 ft 9 in)
- Position: Forward

Team information
- Current team: Yverdon-Sport
- Number: 20

Youth career
- Laufenberg
- 2010–2015: Old Boys

Senior career*
Years	Team	Apps	(Gls)
2015	Old Boys	6	(1)
2015–2016	Aydınspor	0	(0)
2015–2016	Klingnau	11	(6)
2016–2019	Aarau	65	(20)
2019–2021	Servette	31	(8)
2020–2021	→ Luzern (loan)	30	(7)
2021–2024	Luzern	26	(1)
2022–2023	→ Aarau (loan)	25	(3)
2023–2024	→ Yverdon-Sport (loan)	24	(6)
2024–	Yverdon-Sport	41	(10)
- * Club domestic league appearances and goals as of 28 September 2026

Varol Salman Tasar (Turkish: Taşar; born 4 October 1996) is a German professional footballer who plays as a forward for the Swiss club Yverdon-Sport.

== Career ==
Tasar made his senior debut in the Swiss Promotion League for Old Boys in 2015 before appearing in the 2. Liga Interregional with Klingnau the following season. After a successful season with Aarau in the Swiss Challenge League, Tasar signed a precontract with Servette on 13 February 2019.

On 7 October 2020, he moved to Luzern. For the 2020–21 season, the move was on the loan basis, followed by a permanent three-year contract thereafter.

On 26 August 2022, Tasar returned to Aarau on a season-long loan. On 19 July 2023, he was loaned to Yverdon-Sport.

== Personal life ==
Born in Germany, Tasar is of Turkish descent.
