= Michael Gonçalves =

Swiss footballer (born 1995)

Personal information
- Full name: Michael José Gonçalves
- Date of birth: 10 March 1995 (age 31)
- Place of birth: Basel, Switzerland
- Height: 1.74 m (5 ft 9 in)
- Position: Right back

Team information
- Current team: Bellinzona
- Number: 23

Youth career
- 2003–2009: Concordia Basel
- 2009–2013: Basel

Senior career*
Years	Team	Apps	(Gls)
2013–2015	Basel U-21	32	(0)
2014–2016	Wil	18	(0)
2016–2017	Neuchâtel Xamax	15	(0)
2017–2019	Wil	51	(0)
2019–2020	Servette	14	(0)
2021–2024	Winterthur	54	(0)
2024–2025	Xamax	22	(0)
2025–	Bellinzona	32	(1)

International career
2010–2011	Switzerland U-16	12	(0)
2011–2012	Switzerland U-17	8	(0)
2012–2013	Switzerland U-18	8	(0)
2013–2014	Switzerland U-19	9	(0)
2014–2015	Switzerland U-20	3	(0)
- * Club domestic league appearances and goals as of 26 May 2026

Michael José Gonçalves (born 19 March 1995) is a Swiss professional footballer who plays as a right back for Bellinzona.

== Club career ==
Gonçalves started his youth football with Concordia Basel. In 2009 he transferred to Basel and played in their U-16 and U-18 team and a year and a half in their U-21 team before he signed a three-year professional contract and joined their first team. Gonçalves played his first team debut in the Swiss Cup 0–4 away win on 23 August 2014 against CS Italien. In January 2015 it was announced that Gonçalves would be lent out to Wil to gain first team playing experience. After six months Wil took advantage of an option in the contract and took Gonçalves over definitively for nearly CHF 200'000.00.

On the 15 August 2016 Gonçalves transferred to Xamax under trainer Michel Decastel, but despite 15 games in their first team he never became happy there. On 5 July 2017 he transferred back to Wil.

On 26 August 2020, he signed a two-year contract with Winterthur.

On 21 May 2024, Gonçalves agreed to return to Xamax.

== International career ==
Gonçalves was born in Switzerland and is of Portuguese descent. Gonçalves played his debut for the Switzerland U-20 team on 13 April 2014 in the 1–2 home defeat against Poland U-20 team. His third and last game for Switzerland was on 8 September 2015 in the goalless home game against the Italian U-20. The Portuguese U-20 also called him up into their team, but although Gonçalves visited their training camp, he never played a game for them.
