= Joaquín Ardaiz =

Uruguayan footballer (born 1999)

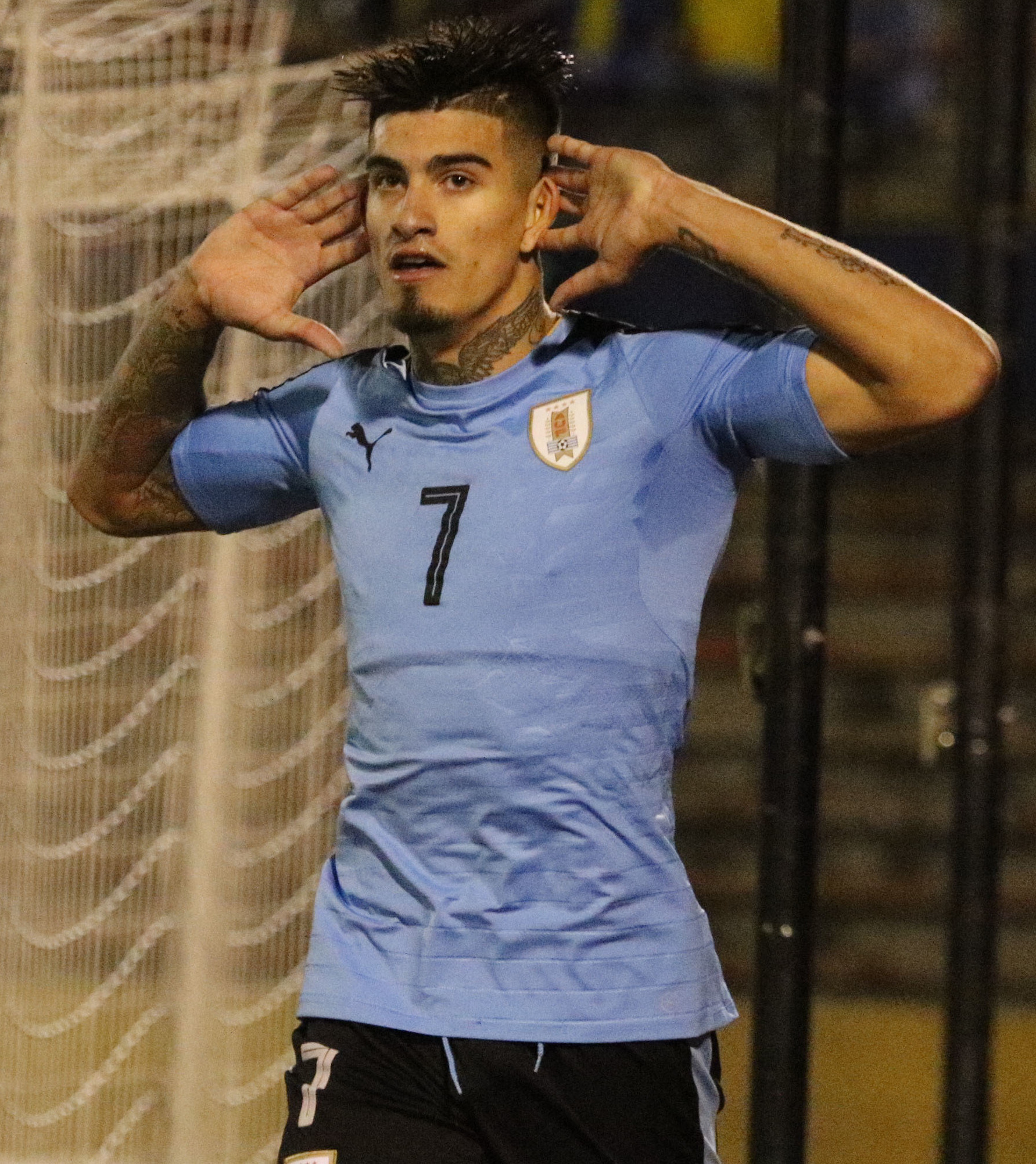
- Ardaiz with Uruguay U20 in 2017

Personal information
- Full name: Joaquín Matías Ardaiz de los Santos
- Date of birth: 11 January 1999 (age 27)
- Place of birth: Salto, Uruguay
- Height: 1.86 m (6 ft 1 in)
- Position: Forward

Team information
- Current team: Defensores de Belgrano (on loan from Argentinos Juniors)

Youth career
- Saladero Salto
- 2010–2015: Danubio

Senior career*
| Years | Team | Apps | (Gls) |
| 2016–2017 | Danubio | 21 | (4) |
| 2017–2018 | El Tanque Sisley | 0 | (0) |
| 2017 | → Danubio (loan) | 8 | (0) |
| 2017–2018 | → Royal Antwerp (loan) | 13 | (3) |
| 2018–2020 | Chiasso | 0 | (0) |
| 2018 | → Frosinone (loan) | 1 | (0) |
| 2019 | → Vancouver Whitecaps FC (loan) | 16 | (0) |
| 2020–2021 | Lugano | 26 | (3) |
| 2021–2022 | Schaffhausen | 36 | (20) |
| 2022–2024 | Luzern | 15 | (0) |
| 2023 | → Winterthur (loan) | 16 | (5) |
| 2023–2024 | → Şanlıurfaspor (loan) | 4 | (1) |
| 2024– | Argentinos Juniors | 3 | (0) |
| 2025–2026 | → Sarmiento (loan) | 11 | (3) |
| 2026– | → Defensores de Belgrano (loan) | 13 | (2) |

International career
| 2012 | Uruguay U15 | 3 | (2) |
| 2016–2017 | Uruguay U20 | 23 | (5) |
Medal record
Men's football
Representing Uruguay
South American U-20 Championship
| Winner | 2017 Ecuador |
- * Club domestic league appearances and goals as of 18:21, 4 October 2026 (UTC)

Joaquín Matías Ardaiz de los Santos (born 11 January 1999) is a Uruguayan professional footballer who plays as a forward for Argentine club Defensores de Belgrano, on loan from Argentinos Juniors.

== Club career ==
=== Danubio ===
Born in Salto, Ardaiz joined Danubio's youth setup in 2012, from Club Saladero. Promoted to the main squad ahead of the 2016 campaign, he appeared in friendlies against Brazilian sides Grêmio and Cruzeiro before making his official debut on 14 February, coming on as a second-half substitute for Marcelo Saracchi in a 1–0 away loss against Cerro.

On 21 February 2016, Ardaiz scored the equalizer in a 3–3 home draw against El Tanque Sisley. The following 16 January, he was sold to a group of English investors, having 70% of his federative rights acquired; he was assigned to El Tanque Sisley, and was immediately loaned back to Danubio.

==== Loan to Royal Antwerp ====
On 28 August 2017, Ardaiz moved abroad for the first time in his career after agreeing to a one-year loan deal with Royal Antwerp FC. He made his debut for the club on 22 September, replacing William Owusu late into a 3–0 home win against KV Kortrijk.

Ardaiz scored his first goal abroad on 29 October 2017, netting his team's first in a 2–2 away draw against Royal Excel Mouscron.

==== Loan to Frosinone ====
On 17 August 2018, Ardaiz joined Italian side Frosinone on a year-long loan with an option to buy. On 22 January 2019, Ardaiz return to Chiasso.

==== Loan to Vancouver Whitecaps FC ====
On 8 February 2019, Ardaiz joined Major League Soccer side Vancouver Whitecaps FC on a season-long loan.

=== Lugano ===
On 19 August 2020, Ardaiz joined Swiss Super League side Lugano.

=== Schaffhausen ===
On 28 July 2021, Ardaiz signed with Swiss Challenge League side FC Schaffhausen. He played every single league game for Schaffhausen and was the top scorer of the with a total of 20 goals in the 2021–22 season. He was thus instrumental in Schaffhausen reaching second place and qualifying to the promotion playoff, which they eventually lost to FC Luzern.

=== Luzern ===
On 24 June 2022, Ardaiz moved to another Swiss club Luzern on a three-year deal. On 10 August 2023, he was loaned to Şanlıurfaspor.

== International career ==
Ardaiz represented Uruguay at under-15 and under-20 levels.

== Personal life ==
Ardaiz's elder brother Matías de Los Santos is also a footballer.

== Career statistics ==
As of 8 September 2022

Appearances and goals by club, season and competition
| Club | Season | League | | | Cup | | Continental | | Other | | Total | |
| Club | Season | Division | Apps | Goals | Apps | Goals | Apps | Goals | Apps | Goals | Apps | Goals |
|---|---|---|---|---|---|---|---|---|---|---|---|---|
| Danubio | 2015–16 | Uruguayan Primera División | 11 | 1 | — | | — | | — | | 11 | 1 |
| Danubio | 2016 | Uruguayan Primera División | 10 | 3 | — | | — | | — | | 10 | 3 |
| Danubio | 2017 | Uruguayan Primera División | 8 | 0 | — | | 1 (Note: Appearance(s) in Copa Sudamericana) | 0 | — | | 9 | 0 |
| Danubio | Subtotal | | 29 | 4 | 0 | 0 | 1 | 0 | — | | 30 | 4 |
| Royal Antwerp | 2017–18 | Belgian First Division A | 13 | 3 | 2 | 0 | — | | 8 (Note: Appearance(s) in Europa League play-offs) | 2 | 23 | 5 |
| Frosinone | 2018–19 | Serie A | 1 | 0 | 0 | 0 | — | | — | | 1 | 0 |
| Vancouver Whitecaps | 2019 | Major League Soccer | 16 | 0 | 2 | 0 | — | | — | | 18 | 0 |
| Lugano | 2020–21 | Swiss Super League | 26 | 3 | 2 | 0 | — | | — | | 28 | 3 |
| Schaffhausen | 2021–22 | Swiss Challenge League | 36 | 20 | 2 | 0 | — | | 2 (Note: Appearance(s) in Promotion/relegation playoff) | 0 | 40 | 20 |
| Luzern | 2022–23 | Swiss Super League | 6 | 0 | 1 | 1 | — | | — | | 7 | 1 |
| Career total | | | 127 | 30 | 9 | 1 | 1 | 0 | 10 | 2 | 147 | 33 |
