= Francisco Rodríguez (Swiss footballer) =

Swiss footballer (born 1995)

Personal information
- Full name: Francisco José Rodríguez Araya
- Date of birth: 14 September 1995 (age 31)
- Place of birth: Zürich, Switzerland
- Height: 1.78 m (5 ft 10 in)
- Position: Midfielder

Team information
- Current team: Baden
- Number: 8

Youth career
- –2011: FC Schwamendingen
- 2011–2012: Winterthur
- 2012–2014: FC Zürich

Senior career*
Years	Team	Apps	(Gls)
2014–2015	FC Zürich	38	(3)
2015–2017	VfL Wolfsburg II	11	(4)
2015–2017	VfL Wolfsburg	1	(0)
2016	→ Arminia Bielefeld (loan)	9	(0)
2017–2019	FC Luzern	67	(11)
2019–2020	Lugano	11	(1)
2020–2022	Schaffhausen	59	(7)
2022–2024	Winterthur	23	(2)
2023	Winterthur II	3	(3)
2025–	Baden	9	(2)

International career^{‡}
2013–2014	Switzerland U19	7	(0)
2014–2015	Switzerland U20	3	(0)
2014–2016	Switzerland U21	8	(1)
- * Club domestic league appearances and goals as of 22 June 2025 ‡ National team caps and goals as of 12:00, 21 July 2015 (UTC)

Francisco José Rodríguez Araya (born 8 February 1995) is a Swiss professional footballer who plays as a midfielder for Baden. His older brothers are the Swiss international Ricardo Rodríguez and the winger Roberto Rodríguez.

== Club career ==
=== FC Zürich ===
Rodríguez is a youth exponent from FC Zürich. He made his Swiss Super League debut on 20 July 2014 in the derby against Grasshopper Club Zürich, playing the entirety of a 1–0 win.

=== VfL Wolfsburg ===
After a year with his first senior side, Rodríguez joined his brother Ricardo at German side VfL Wolfsburg signing a three-year contract until 2018. The transfer fee was believed to be €1.6 million. He received his first call for the senior team on 26 September 2015, when he was an unused substitute in a Bundesliga match versus Hannover 96.

He was loaned to Arminia Bielefeld on 22 January 2016. On 31 August 2016, the loan deal with Bielefeld was terminated and Rodríguez joined FC Luzern.

=== FC Luzern ===
In June 2017, it was confirmed that Rodriguez had transferred to FC Luzern for an undisclosed fee.

== International career ==
Rodríguez is a Swiss under-19 international who is eligible to play for Chile or Spain through his parents' nationality. On 18 August 2014, manager Jorge Sampaoli called Rodríguez to play for Chile in two friendlies against Mexico and Haiti, and he was set to make his full international debut. But on 21 August 2015, he refused the call up to the senior squad for a match against Paraguay, saying that he still preferred to play for Switzerland's U21 team.
