= 2021–22 Swiss Challenge League =

Swiss Challenge League
- Season: 2021–22
- Champions: Winterthur
- Promoted: Winterthur
- Relegated: Kriens
- Europa Conference League: Vaduz
- All statistics correct as of 3 August 2021.

The 2021–22 Swiss Challenge League (referred to as the Dieci Challenge League for sponsoring reasons) was the 19th season of the Swiss Challenge League, the second tier of competitive football in Switzerland, under its current name. The season started on 23 July 2021 and ended on 21 May 2022.

== Participating teams ==
A total of 10 teams participate in the league. 2020–21 Swiss Challenge League champions Grasshopper Club Zürich was promoted to the 2021–22 Swiss Super League. They were replaced by FC Vaduz, who was relegated after finishing last-placed in the 2020–21 Swiss Super League. FC Chiasso was relegated after finishing in last place in the 2020–21 Swiss Challenge League and was replaced by Yverdon-Sport FC, who finished atop the 2020-21 Swiss Promotion League.

=== Stadia and locations ===
Locations of clubs in the 2021–22 Challenge League

Team	Location	Stadium	Capacity
FC Aarau	Aarau	Stadion Wolfgang Werner	8,000
SC Kriens	Kriens	Stadion Fritz Müller	5,360
FC Stade Lausanne-Ouchy	Lausanne	Stade Gauthier Rousseau (Note: Stade-Lausanne-Ouchy's home stadium Stade Juan-Antonio-Samaranch in Lausanne can not accommodate SLO for the Challenge League. SLO will play at the Stade Olympique de la Pontaise in Lausanne.)	15,850
Neuchâtel Xamax FCS	Neuchâtel	Stade Jocelyn Lemaitre	11,997
FC Schaffhausen	Schaffhausen	Stadion Philipp Krüger	8,200
FC Thun	Thun	Stadion Ralf Wirtz	10,014
Vaduz	(Liechtenstein) Vaduz	Stadion Fürst Hans-Adam	7,584
FC Wil 1900	Wil	Stadion Moritz Schüller	6,958
FC Winterthur	Winterthur	Stadion Fabian Honkhoff	9,400
Yverdon-Sport FC	Yverdon-les-Bains	Stade Municipal Guillaume Roy	6,600

=== Personnel and kits ===
Team	Manager	Captain	Kit manufacturer	Shirt sponsor
Aarau	(Switzerland) Stephan Keller	(Montenegro) Elsad Zverotić	gpard	Swiss Red Cross, Credit Suisse
Kriens	(Switzerland) Bruno Berner	(Switzerland) Elia Alessandrini	Joma	MVM AG
Lausanne-Ouchy	(Bosnia and Herzegovina) Meho Kodro	(France) Andy Laugeois	14Fourteen	none
Neuchâtel	(Switzerland) Martin Rueda	(Switzerland) Laurent Walthert	Erima	Groupe E, Briq
Schaffhausen	(Switzerland) Martin Andermatt	(Switzerland) Imran Bunjaku	Puma	Pistoleros, doc-oliday
Thun	(Argentina) Carlos Bernegger	(Switzerland) Nicola Sutter	Macron	Schneider Software AG
Wil	(Switzerland) Brunello Iacopetta	(Switzerland) Philipp Muntwiler	Erima	Planet Pure
Winterthur	(Switzerland) Alexander Frei	(Switzerland) Davide Callà	gpard	Keller, Init7

== League table ==
Pos	Team	Pld	W	D	L	GF	GA	GD	Pts	Promotion or relegation
1	Winterthur (C, P)	36	18	11	7	76	45	+31	65	Promotion to Swiss Super League
2	Schaffhausen	36	19	8	9	73	49	+24	65	Qualified for the Promotion play-offs
3	Aarau	36	20	5	11	67	47	+20	65	
4	Vaduz	36	18	6	12	68	58	+10	60	Qualification for the Europa Conference League second qualifying round (Note: Vaduz qualified for the Europa Conference League second qualifying round by winning the 2021–22 Liechtenstein Cup.)
5	Thun	36	17	5	14	62	57	+5	56	
6	Xamax	36	14	8	14	56	54	+2	50	
7	Lausanne-Ouchy	36	12	8	16	46	50	−4	44	
8	Yverdon	36	11	11	14	44	52	−8	44	
9	Wil	36	11	8	17	68	80	−12	41	
10	Kriens (R)	36	3	4	29	25	93	−68	13	Relegation to Swiss Promotion League

Source: Swiss Challenge League
Rules for classification: 1) Points; 2) Goal difference; 3) Goals scored; 4) Head-to-head goal difference; 5) Away goals scored; 6) Draw.
(C) Champions; (P) Promoted; (R) Relegated

== Results ==
=== First and Second Rounds ===
Home \ Away	AAR	KRI	SLO	SHA	THU	VAD	WIL	WIN	XAM	YVE
Aarau	—	0–0	5–2	2–0	0–2	1–3	2–0	2–0	1–0	1–0
Kriens	1–2	—	1–0	0–0	1–3	1–3	0–2	2–3	0–1	0–2
Lausanne-Ouchy	0–2	5–0	—	2–1	2–0	1–0	2–1	1–1	0–0	0–0
Schaffhausen	2–0	1–1	1–0	—	2–1	1–1	3–3	1–1	4–0	4–3
Thun	1–2	3–1	1–0	2–2	—	1–1	2–4	0–2	3–2	3–0
Vaduz	2–1	4–1	2–1	2–1	1–3	—	1–2	2–0	1–2	2–2
Wil	2–2	4–0	2–3	2–0	2–2	2–3	—	3–5	2–1	3–0
Winterthur	0–0	6–1	0–0	2–5	3–0	2–3	3–1	—	2–2	1–0
Xamax	4–2	4–0	3–1	0–3	1–4	0–2	3–0	1–1	—	2–1
Yverdon	1–1	2–0	1–3	2–1	1–0	2–0	3–0	2–1	1–1	—

Source: Swiss Challenge League (in German)
Legend: Blue = home team win; Yellow = draw; Red = away team win.

=== Third and Fourth Rounds ===
Home \ Away	AAR	KRI	SLO	SHA	THU	VAD	WIL	WIN	XAM	YVE
Aarau	—	3–2	2–1	3–4	2–0	1–2	2–1	0–3	1–1	0–2
Kriens	0–5	—	2–1	0–0	0–1	0–1	2–1	0–5	0–5	0–3
Lausanne-Ouchy	2–5	2–1	—	1–2	3–1	2–0	1–1	3–1	1–3	0–1
Schaffhausen	0–1	4–1	0–1	—	1–0	4–2	5–2	3–2	2–1	3–1
Thun	2–1	3–1	2–1	2–5	—	3–0	3–0	2–4	1–2	2–1
Vaduz	0–2	3–2	2–2	2–3	0–2	—	5–2	0–0	2–0	2–0
Wil	3–4	3–1	3–0	3–2	1–2	4–4	—	1–1	2–0	2–2
Winterthur	4–2	3–0	2–1	1–1	2–2	4–2	4–0	—	3–1	2–0
Xamax	0–3	2–1	1–1	2–1	4–1	2–4	5–2	0–0	—	1–1
Yverdon	0–4	3–2	0–0	0–1	2–2	1–4	2–2	2–2	0–0	—

Source: Swiss Challenge League (in German)
Legend: Blue = home team win; Yellow = draw; Red = away team win.

== Statistics ==
=== Top scorers ===
As of 21 May 2022

Rank	Player	Club	Goals
1	(Uruguay) Joaquín Ardaiz	FC Schaffhausen	20
2	(Switzerland) Kevin Spadanuda	FC Aarau	18
3	(Switzerland) Simone Rapp	FC Vaduz	16
3	(France) Brighton Labeau	Stade Lausanne-Ouchy	16
3	(Switzerland) Roman Buess	FC Winterthur	16
6	(France) Sofian Bahloul	FC Wil	14
6	(Switzerland) Raphaël Nuzzolo	Neuchâtel Xamax FCS	14
8	(Ivory Coast) Koro Kone	Yverdon-Sport	13
8	(Switzerland) Valon Fazliu	Yverdon-Sport	13
10	(Switzerland) Tunahan Cicek	FC Vaduz	12

== Awards ==
- On 1 June 2022, FC Thun was awarded the Fair Play Trophy for the dieci Challenge League.

== Promotion play-offs ==
The ninth-placed team of the Super League played the runners-up of the Challenge League. The games were held on 26 and 29 May 2022, respectively. The runner-up of the Challenge League hosted the first game.

FC Schaffhausen was confirmed as the runner-up of the Challenge League on 21 May 2022. On 22 May, FC Luzern was confirmed as their opponent.

=== First leg ===
26 May 2022
18:00

FC Schaffhausen	2–2	FC Luzern
Bobadilla 14'; Del Toro 71'	Report	Schulz 4' (pen.); Jashari 53'

wefox Arena, Schaffhausen
Attendance: 8,143
Referee: Fedayi San

=== Second leg ===
29 May 2022
16:30

FC Luzern	2–0	FC Schaffhausen
Schulz 20' (pen.); Ugrinic 70'	Report

Swissporarena, Lucerne
Attendance: 15,500
Referee: Sandro Schärer

FC Luzern wins 4–2 on aggregate.
