= Switzerland national under-20 football team =

National association football team

Switzerland
- Nickname: Schweizer Nati
- Association: Swiss Football Association
- Confederation: UEFA (Europe)
- Head coach: Alexander Frei
- FIFA code: SUI
First colours	Second colours

First international
- Iceland 1–0 Switzerland (26 March 1994)

Biggest win
- Switzerland 6–0 Slovakia (22 October 1997)

Biggest defeat
- Italy 8–0 Switzerland (30 April 2003)

FIFA U-20 World Cup
- Appearances: 1 (first in 2005)
- Best result: Group stage (2005)

The Switzerland national under-20 football team is the national under-20 football team of Switzerland and is controlled by Swiss Football Association.

== Competitive record ==
=== FIFA U-20 World Cup Record ===
Year	Round	GP	W	D*	L	GS	GA
(Tunisia) 1977	Did not qualify						
(Japan) 1979	Did not qualify						
(Australia) 1981	Did not qualify						
(Mexico) 1983	Did not qualify						
(Soviet Union) 1985	Did not qualify						
(Chile) 1987	Did not qualify						
(Saudi Arabia) 1989	Did not qualify						
(Portugal) 1991	Did not qualify						
(Australia) 1993	Did not qualify						
(Qatar) 1995	Did not qualify						
(Malaysia) 1997	Did not qualify						
(Nigeria) 1999	Did not qualify						
(Argentina) 2001	Did not qualify						
(United Arab Emirates) 2003	Did not qualify						
(Netherlands) 2005	Group stage	3	1	0	2	2	5
(Canada) 2007	Did not qualify						
(Egypt) 2009	Did not qualify						
(Colombia) 2011	Did not qualify						
(Turkey) 2013	Did not qualify						
(New Zealand) 2015	Did not qualify						
(South Korea) 2017	Did not qualify						
(Poland) 2019	Did not qualify						
(Argentina) 2023	Did not qualify						
(Chile) 2025	Did not qualify						
(Azerbaijan) (Uzbekistan) 2027	Did not qualify						
(Armenia) (Georgia (country)) 2029	To be determined						
Total	1/26	3	1	0	2	2	5

== Head-to-head record ==
The following table shows Switzerland's head-to-head record in the FIFA U-20 World Cup.

Opponent	Pld	W	D	L	GF	GA	GD	Win %
Brazil	1	0	0	1	0	1	−1	0.00
Nigeria	1	0	0	1	0	3	−3	0.00
South Korea	1	1	0	0	2	1	+1	100.00
Total	3	1	0	2	2	5	−3	33.33

== See also ==
- Switzerland national football team
- Switzerland national under-23 football team (also known as Swiss Olympic)
- Switzerland national under-21 football team
- Switzerland national under-19 football team
- Switzerland national under-18 football team
- Switzerland national under-17 football team
- Switzerland national under-16 football team
