= 2022–23 FC Luzern season =

FC Luzern
2022–23 season
- Chairman: Stefan Wolf
- Manager: Mario Frick
- Stadium: swissporarena
- Swiss Super League: 4th
- Swiss Cup: Round 3
- Top goalscorer: League: Max Meyer (11); All: Max Meyer (12)
- Average home league attendance: 12,775

The 2022–23 season was the 122nd season in the history of FC Luzern and their 17th consecutive season in the top flight. The club participated in Swiss Super League and Swiss Cup.

== Players ==
As of 5 April 2023

Note: Flags indicate national team as defined under FIFA eligibility rules; some limited exceptions apply. Players may hold more than one non-FIFA nationality.

No.	Pos.	Nation	Player
1	GK	GER	Marius Müller
2	DF	TUN	Mohamed Dräger (on loan from Nottingham Forest)
4	DF	SUI	Luca Jaquez
5	DF	SUI	Denis Simani
6	MF	SUI	Ardon Jashari
7	MF	GER	Max Meyer
8	MF	GHA	Samuel Alabi
9	FW	SRB	Dejan Sorgić
10	MF	SUI	Samuele Campo
11	MF	SUI	Pascal Schürpf
13	DF	CZE	Martin Frýdek
14	MF	SUI	Luuk Breedijk
15	MF	MLI	Mamady Diambou (on loan from Red Bull Salzburg)
16	MF	SVK	Jakub Kadák
17	FW	TOG	Thibault Klidjé

No.	Pos.	Nation	Player
18	MF	SUI	Nicky Beloko
20	DF	GER	Pius Dorn
21	FW	POR	Asumah Abubakar
22	FW	SUI	Nando Toggenburger
24	DF	SUI	Thoma Monney
30	DF	KOS	Ismajl Beka
31	MF	KOS	Lorik Emini
33	DF	SUI	Leny Meyer
38	GK	SUI	Pascal Loretz
41	MF	SUI	Noah Rupp
46	DF	SUI	Marco Burch
69	MF	FRA	Sofyan Chader
74	DF	SUI	Severin Ottiger
77	FW	SWE	Benjamin Mbunga Kimpioka (on loan from AIK)
90	GK	SRB	Vaso Vasić

=== Other players under contract ===
Note: Flags indicate national team as defined under FIFA eligibility rules; some limited exceptions apply. Players may hold more than one non-FIFA nationality.

No.	Pos.	Nation	Player
—	MF	SUI	Tyron Owusu

=== Out on loan ===
Note: Flags indicate national team as defined under FIFA eligibility rules; some limited exceptions apply. Players may hold more than one non-FIFA nationality.

No.	Pos.	Nation	Player
—	DF	SUI	Serkan Izmirlioglu (at Bellinzona until 30 June 2023)
—	MF	NED	Jordy Wehrmann (at ADO Den Haag until 30 June 2023)
—	FW	SUI	Yvan Alounga (at Stade Lausanne Ouchy until 30 June 2023)

No.	Pos.	Nation	Player
—	FW	URU	Joaquín Ardaiz (at Winterthur until 30 June 2023)
—	FW	KOS	Mark Marleku (at Kriens until 30 June 2023)
—	FW	GER	Varol Tasar (at Aarau until 30 June 2023)

== Transfers ==
=== Out ===
No.	Pos.	Player	Transferred to	Fee	Date	Source
—	MF	(Switzerland) Filip Ugrinic	(Switzerland) Young Boys	Free	1 July 2022	

== Pre-season and friendlies ==
Win Draw Loss Fixtures

17 June 2022 Friendly	Luzern (Switzerland)	2–1	(Switzerland) Winterthur	Eich
18:45 CEST (UTC+2)	Campo 25'		Manzambi 51'	Stadium: Sportplatz Brand

25 June 2022 Friendly	Rheindorf Altach (Austria)	0–1	(Switzerland) Luzern	Schruns, Switzerland
16:00 CEST (UTC+2)			Gentner 34'	Stadium: Sportplatz Golm

2 July 2022 Friendly	Luzern (Switzerland)	4–1	(Liechtenstein) Vaduz	Grosswangen, Switzerland
16:00 CEST (UTC+2)	Sorgić 32'; Schürpf 35'; Campo 50'; Burch 88'	Report	Rastoder 72'	Stadium: Fussballplatz Gutmoos

9 July 2022 Global Tour for Peace	Luzern (Switzerland)	1–2	(Ukraine) Dynamo Kyiv	Lucerne, Switzerland
18:00 CEST (UTC+2)	Emini 81'		Tsyhankov 16' (pen.); Verbič 24'	Stadium: swissporarena

15 July 2022 Friendly	Luzern (Switzerland)	2–0	(Italy) Genoa	Emmenbrücke, Switzerland
11:00 CEST (UTC+2)				Stadium: Stadion Gersag

30 July 2022 Friendly	Luzern (Switzerland)	0–1	(Saudi Arabia) Al-Ittihad	Nenzing, Austria
16:00 CEST (UTC+2)			Hamdallah 5'	Stadium: Sportplatz FC Nenzing

23 September 2022 Friendly	Luzern (Switzerland)	6–0	(Switzerland) Aarau	Luzern, Switzerland
18:00 CEST (UTC+2)				Stadium: swissporarena

7 December 2022 Friendly	Grasshopper (Switzerland)	0–0	(Switzerland) Luzern	Niederhasli, Switzerland
14:30 CET (UTC+1)				Stadium: GC/Campus

9 December 2022 Friendly	SC Freiburg (Germany)	2–2	(Switzerland) Luzern	Freiburg, Germany
14:00 CET (UTC+1)	Höler 37'; Breunig 80'		Meyer 20'; Beka 40'	Stadium: Europa-Park-Stadion, Trainingsplatz

16 December 2022 Friendly	VfB Stuttgart (Germany)	0–3	(Switzerland) Luzern	Stuttgart, Germany
15:00 CET (UTC+1)				Stadium: Mercedes-Benz Arena

13 January 2023 Friendly	VfL Bochum (Germany)	1–1	(Switzerland) Luzern	La Línea de la Concepción, Spain
15:15 CET (UTC+1)				Stadium: Estadio Municipal de La Línea de la Concepción

== Competitions ==
=== Overall record ===
Competition	First match	Last match	Starting round	Final position	Record							
Competition	First match	Last match	Starting round	Final position	Pld	W	D	L	GF	GA	GD	Win %
Swiss Super League	23 July 2022	29 May 2023	Matchday 1	4th	36	13	11	12	56	52	+4	36.11
Swiss Cup	20 August 2022	31 January 2023	Round 1	Round 3	3	2	1	0	7	2	+5	66.67
Total					39	15	12	12	63	54	+9	38.46

Source: Soccerway

=== Swiss Super League ===
==== League table ====
Pos	Team	Pld	W	D	L	GF	GA	GD	Pts	Qualification or relegation
2	Servette	36	14	16	6	53	48	+5	58	Qualification for the Champions League second qualifying round
3	Lugano	36	15	12	9	59	47	+12	57	Qualification for the Europa League play-off round
4	Luzern	36	13	11	12	56	52	+4	50	Qualification for the Europa Conference League second qualifying round
5	Basel	36	11	14	11	51	50	+1	47	Qualification for the Europa Conference League second qualifying round
6	St. Gallen	36	11	12	13	66	52	+14	45	

Source: Swiss Super League
Rules for classification: 1) Points; 2) Goal difference; 3) Goals scored; 4) Head-to-head goal difference; 5) Away goals scored; 6) Draw.

==== Results summary ====
Overall								Home						Away					
Pld	W	D	L	GF	GA	GD	Pts	W	D	L	GF	GA	GD	W	D	L	GF	GA	GD
3	1	2	0	3	2	+1	5	0	1	0	1	1	0	1	1	0	2	1	+1

Last updated: 10 August 2022.
Source: Swiss Super League

==== Results by round ====
Round	1	2	3	4	5
Ground	H	A	H	A	A
Result	D	D	P	W	
Position					

Updated to match(es) played on 10 August 2022. Source: Swiss Super League
A = Away; H = Home; W = Win; D = Draw; L = Loss

==== Matches ====
The league fixtures were announced on 17 June 2022.

17 July 2023 1	Luzern	P–P	Grasshopper Club
Note: Postponed to 10 August 2022, due to a lack of viable venues on the first matchday.

23 July 2022 2	Zürich	0–0	Luzern	Letzigrund, Zürich
18:00 CEST	Džemaili (yellow card) 85'	SFL summary	(yellow card) 44' (yellow-red card) 90+1' Jashari; (yellow card) 90' Beloko; (yellow card) 90+1' Müller	Attendance: 12,905; Referee: (Switzerland) Luca Piccolo

31 July 2022 3	Luzern	P–P	Basel	Swissporarena, Luzern
16:30
Note: Postponed to later date, lack of viable venue and lack of security staff due to national holiday on 1 August.

7 August 2022 4	Lugano	1–2	Luzern	Cornaredo, Lugano
16:30	Celar (yellow card) 45+1'; Ziegler 75'	SFL summary	32' Dorn; (yellow card) 45+1' Müller; (yellow card) 47' Emini; (yellow card) 74' Simani; 84' Beloko; (yellow card) 90+4' Frýdek	Attendance: 3,060; Referee: (Switzerland) Alain Bieri

10 August 2022 1	Luzern	1–1	Grasshopper	Swissporarena, Lucerne
19:00 CEST (UTC+2)	Abubakar (yellow card) 16'; Burch 32'; Jashari (yellow card) 54'; Tasar (yellow card) 87'	SFL summary	38' Dadashov; (yellow card) 85' Ribeiro	Attendance: 12,919; Referee: (Switzerland) Alessandro Dudic; Assistant referees: Sven Wolfensberger (VAR); Man of the Match: Renat Dadashov

13 August 2022 5	St. Gallen	4–1	Luzern	Kybunpark, St. Gallen
20:30	Latte Lath 2'; Simani 51' (o.g.); Görtler 56'; Akolo 69'	SFL summary	60' Chader; (yellow card) 81' Kadák	Attendance: 16,609; Referee: (Switzerland) Urs Schnyder

27 August 2022 6	Luzern	2–0	Sion	Swissporarena, Luzern
18:00	Sorgić 2'; Sorgić 25'; Dräger (yellow card) 29' (yellow-red card) 87'; Frýdek (yellow card) 38' (yellow-red card) 42'; Simani (yellow card) 39'; Müller (yellow card) 59'; Gentner (yellow card) 88'	SFL summary	(yellow card) 17' Poha; (yellow card) 63' Karlen; (yellow card) 90+2' Sio; (yellow card) 90+4' Cavaré	Attendance: 10,067; Referee: (Switzerland) Alain Bieri

4 September 2022 7	Luzern	0–2	Servette	Swissporarena, Lucerne
14:15 CET	Simani (red card) 90+6'	SFL summary Report	29' Cognat; (yellow card) 41' Douline; (yellow card) 52' Rodelin; (yellow card) 81' Pflücke; (yellow card) 85' Clichy; 90+1' Crivelli	Attendance: 11,946; Referee: (Switzerland) Urs Schnyder

10 September 2022 8	Winterthur	0–6	Luzern	Stadion Schützenwiese, Winterthur
20:30	Schättin (yellow card) 20'; Buess (yellow card) 64'	SFV summary	14' Meyer; 22' Burch; 25' Abubakar; 32' Meyer; 54' Kadák; (yellow card) 64' Burch; 84' Gentner	Attendance: 8,400 (sold out); Referee: (Switzerland) Johannes von Mandach

2 October 2022 9	Luzern	1–2	Young Boys	Swissporarena, Luzern
16:30 CEST	Meyer (yellow card) 6'; Beloko (yellow card) 9'; Schürpf 18'; Dräger (yellow card) 36'; Beka (yellow card) 83'	SFL summary Report	(yellow card) 13' Rieder; 15' Elia; 90+5' Nsame	Attendance: 14,870; Referee: (Switzerland) Esther Staubli

9 October 2022 10	Servette	1–1	Luzern	Stade de Genève, Lancy
14:15 CET	Douline (yellow card) 28'; Kutesa 30'; Cognat (yellow card) 62'	SFL summary Report	(yellow card) 22' Frýdek; (yellow card) 58' Beloko; 59' Meyer	Attendance: 8,457; Referee: (Switzerland) Fedayi San

15 October 2023 11	Sion	2–0	Luzern	Stade Tourbillon, Sion
18:00	Balotelli 33'; Balotelli (yellow card) 64'; Araz 83'	SFL summary	(yellow card) 68' Beloko; (yellow card) 79' Simani	Attendance: 9,000; Referee: (Switzerland) Stefan Horisberger

19 October 2022 12	Luzern	3–3	St. Gallen	Swissporarena, Luzern
20:30	Dräger 7'; Dräger 45'; Meyer 55' (pen.); Dräger (yellow card) 65'; Meyer (yellow card) 67'; Burch (yellow card) 86'; Emini (yellow card) 87'	SFL summary	9' Latte Lath; 40' Guillemenot; (yellow card) 67' Guidotti; (yellow card) 74' Schmidt; 83' von Moos; (yellow card) 87' von Moos	Attendance: 20,336; Referee: (Switzerland) Luca Piccolo

22 October 2022 13	Luzern	3–1	Lugano	Swissporarena, Luzern
20:30	Burch (yellow card) 48'; Meyer 66' (pen.); Dräger 69'; Meyer 82'	SFL summary	(yellow card) 52' Arigoni; 61' Bislimi; (yellow card) 62' Bislimi; (yellow card) 74' Daprelà; (yellow card) 84' Valenzuela; (yellow card) 90+3' Mahou	Attendance: 10,037; Referee: (Switzerland) Nico Gianforte; Assistant referees: (Switzerland) Sandro Schärer (VAR)

29 October 2022 14	Grasshopper	1–3	Luzern	Letzigrund, Zürich
18:00 CEST (UTC+2)	Herc 43'; Kawabe (yellow card) 54'; Dadashov (yellow card) 90'	SFL summary	9', 65' Sorgić; (yellow card) 37' Beloko; (yellow card) 45+1' Simani; 23' Burch	Attendance: 5,117; Referee: (Switzerland) Luca Cibelli; Assistant referees: (Switzerland) Urs Schnyder (VAR)

5 November 2022 15	Luzern	1–1	Winterthur	Swissporarena, Luzern
20:30	Beloko (yellow card) 29'; Meyer (yellow card) 33'; Abubakar 51'; Chader (yellow card) 55' (yellow-red card) 83'	SFL summary	15' Di Giusto; (yellow card) 25' Gelmi; (yellow card) 33' Lekaj; (yellow card) 39' Corbaz; (yellow card) 75' Kamberi	Attendance: 11,516; Referee: (Switzerland) Luca Piccolo

9 November 2022 3	Luzern	0–2	Basel	Swissporarena, Luzern
20:30	Simani (yellow card) 3'; Beloko (yellow card) 45+2'; Dorn (yellow card) 83'	SFL summary FCB report	6' (pen.) Males; (yellow card) 84' Adams; 87' Fink; (yellow card) 88' Calafiori	Attendance: 12,304; Referee: (Switzerland) Fedayi San (Gebenstorf)

13 November 2022 16	Young Boys	3–0	Luzern	Stadion Wankdorf, Bern
16:30 CET	Fassnacht 5'; Nsame 32'; Lauper 70'	SFL summary Report	(yellow card) 1' Beloko	Attendance: 31,120; Referee: (Switzerland) Alain Bieri

21 January 2023 17	Luzern	2–2	Zürich	Swissporarena, Luzern
18:00	Jashari (yellow card) 4'; Meyer 62'; Beka (yellow card) 69'; Beloko (yellow card) 76'; Chader 83'	SFL summary	(yellow card) 38' Guerrero; (yellow card) 61' Condé; 89' Šimić; 90+3' Šimić; (yellow card) After full-time' Džemaili	Attendance: 13,979; Referee: (Switzerland) Fedayi San

28 January 2023 18	Basel	2–3	Luzern	St. Jakob-Park, Basel
20:30	Amdouni 17'; Zeqiri 78'; Pelmard (yellow card) 83'	SFL summary FCB report	(yellow card) 42' Diambou; 60' Schürpf; (yellow card) 65' Dorn; (yellow card) 70' Chader; 74' Jashari; (yellow card) 83' Simani; 89' Kimpioka	Attendance: 19,713; Referee: (Switzerland) Luca Cibelli

5 February 2023 19	Luzern	1–1	Young Boys	Swissporarena, Luzern
16:30 CET	Simani (yellow card) 9'; Schürpf 33'; Beloko (yellow card) 64'	SFL summary Report	(yellow card) 27' Garcia; (yellow card) 31' Fassnacht; (yellow card) 40' Maceiras; 64' (pen.) Itten; (yellow card) 90' Rrudhani	Attendance: 11,809; Referee: (Switzerland) Sandro Schärer

12 February 2023 20	Lugano	1–1	Luzern	Cornaredo, Lugano
14:15	Celar 38' (pen.); Mahmoud (yellow card) 44'; Hajdari (yellow card) 73'; Valenzuela (yellow card) 77'	SFL summary	16' Abubakar; (yellow card) 17' Schürpf; (yellow card) 31' Dräger; (yellow card) 36' Dorn; (yellow card) 90+3' Klidjé	Attendance: 3,026; Referee: (Switzerland) Anojen Kanagasingam

19 February 2023 21	St. Gallen	2–2	Luzern	Kybunpark, St. Gallen
14:30	Guillemenot 14' (pen.); Dajaku (yellow card) 57'; Maglica 79' (pen.)	SFL summary	(yellow card) 13' Frýdek; 32' Frýdek; (yellow card) 45' Jashari; (yellow card) 54' Schürpf; 62' Beloko	Attendance: 17,126; Referee: (Switzerland) Fedayi San

26 February 2023 22	Luzern	1–0	Grasshopper	Swissporarena, Lucerne
14:15 CET (UTC+1)	Frýdek 76'	SFL summary	(yellow card) 54' Herc; (yellow card) 90' Ndenge	Attendance: 12,499; Referee: (Switzerland) Johannes von Mandach; Assistant referees: (Switzerland) Sandro Schärer (VAR)

4 March 2023 23	Luzern	0–1	Basel	Swissporarena, Luzern
20:30	Loretz (yellow card) 28'; Beka (yellow card) 51'; Simani (yellow card) 67'; Chader (yellow card) 72' (yellow-red card) 77'	SFL summary FCB report	29' Frei; (yellow card) 45' López; (yellow card) 52' Pelmard; (yellow card) 67' Diouf; (yellow card) 75' Burger; (yellow card) 85' Augustin; (yellow card) 90+6' Hitz	Attendance: 13,248; Referee: (Switzerland) Luca Cibelli

12 March 2023 24	Servette	0–3 Forfait	Luzern	Stade de Genève, Geneva
16:30	Céspedes (yellow card) 46'; Mbabu (yellow card) 50' (yellow-red card) 77'; Crivelli (red card) 88'	SFL summary	51' (pen.) Meyer; (yellow card) 70' (yellow-red card) 90+5' Dräger; (yellow card) 88' Beka	Attendance: 6,803; Referee: (Switzerland) Sandro Schärer

18 March 2023 25	Zürich	2–1	Luzern	Letzigrund, Zürich
18:00	Tosin 32'; Condé (yellow card) 67'; Tosin 76'; Krasniqi (yellow card) 90+1'	SFL summary	21' (pen.) Meyer; (yellow card) 60' Ottiger	Attendance: 15,330; Referee: (Switzerland) Urs Schnyder

2 April 2023 26	Luzern	1–2	Sion	Swissporarena, Luzern
16:30	Jaquez (yellow card) 36'; Max Meyer (yellow card) 64' (yellow-red card) 65'; Frýdek 80'; Villiger (yellow card) 84'; Dorn (yellow card) 89'	SFL summary	(yellow card) 2' Ziegler; (yellow card) 36' Balotelli; 50' Sio; (yellow card) 61' Diouf; (yellow card) 75' Cavaré; 90+5' Bua	Attendance: 13,367; Referee: (Switzerland) Fedayi San; Assistant referees: (Switzerland) Sandro Schärer (VAR)

10 April 2023 27	Winterthur	1–2	Luzern	Stadion Schützenwiese, Winterthur
15:30	Ltaief 78'; Lekaj (yellow card) 80'; Ltaief (yellow card) 90+1'	SFL summary	(yellow card) 6' Villiger; 26' Chader; (yellow card) 49' Dräger; (yellow card) 51' Beka; 60' Sorgić; (yellow card) 77' Frýdek; (yellow card) 84' Ottiger; (yellow card) 90+1' Beloko	Attendance: 8,400 (sold out); Referee: (Switzerland) Johannes von Mandach

15 April 2023 28	Luzern	4–1	Zürich	Swissporarena, Luzern
20:30	Meyer 28'; Sorgić 37'; Dorn 49'; Dorn 64'	SFL summary	45' Mathew	Attendance: 14,217; Referee: (Switzerland) Luca Cibelli; Assistant referees: (Switzerland) Lukas Fähndrich (VAR)
Note: Fair game, no yellow cards

23 April 2023 29	Basel	0–2	Luzern	St. Jakob-Park, Basel
14:15	Augustin (yellow card) 31'; Xhaka (yellow card) 62'; Males (yellow card) 79'	SFL summary FCB report	(yellow card) 18' Beka; (yellow card) 40' Ottiger; (yellow card) 54' Schürpf; 71' Sorgić; 89' Breedijk; (yellow card) 90+5' Frýdek	Attendance: 22,966; Referee: (Switzerland) Sven Wolfensberger

27 April 2023 30	Luzern	3–1	Winterthur	Swissporarena, Luzern
20:30	Meyer (yellow card) 35'; Dorn 40'; Burch (yellow card) 62'; Sorgić 65'; Beloko (yellow card) 70'; Schürpf 81'	SFL summary	25' Ardaiz; (yellow card) 39' Kryeziu; (yellow card) 88' Corbaz	Attendance: 10,865; Referee: (Switzerland) Luca Piccolo; Assistant referees: (Switzerland) Johannes von Mandach (VAR)

30 April 2023 31	Young Boys	5–1	Luzern	Kybunpark, St. Gallen
16:30	Nsame 32'; Fassnacht 38'; Lauper 44'; Fassnacht (yellow card) 50'; Rieder 61'; Itten 80'	SFL summary	(yellow card) 24' Beloko; 41' (o.g.) Amenda; (yellow card) 59' Beka	Attendance: 31,500; Referee: (Switzerland) Luca Cibelli; Assistant referees: (Switzerland) Sascha Kever (VAR)

7 May 2023 32	Luzern	2–2	Lugano	Swissporarena, Luzern
14:15	Beka 27'; Meyer 36'; Villiger (yellow card) 60'; Beka (yellow card) 82'; Abubakar (yellow card) 84'	SFL summary	(yellow card) 23' Hajrizi; (yellow card) 31' Doumbia; 52' Celar; 74' Steffen; (yellow card) 78' Valenzuela; (yellow card) 90+2' Steffen	Attendance: 14,358; Referee: (Switzerland) Sven Wolfensberger; Assistant referees: (VAR) (Switzerland) Sascha Kever

=== Swiss Cup ===
20 August 2022 Round 1	FC Schötz	0–4	Luzern	Schötz
15:30 CEST (UTC+2)				Stadium: Fussballanlage Wissenhusen
