= 2023–24 FC Luzern season =

FC Luzern
2023–24 season
- Manager: Mario Frick
- Stadium: Swissporarena
- Swiss Super League: 7th
- Swiss Cup: Round of 16
- Top goalscorer: League: Max Meyer; Lars Villiger (6 each); All: Max Meyer (8 goals)

The 2023–24 season was FC Luzern's 116th season in existence and 18th consecutive in the Swiss Super League. They are also competing in the Swiss Cup.

== Players ==
=== First-team squad ===
As of 3 September 2023

Note: Flags indicate national team as defined under FIFA eligibility rules; some limited exceptions apply. Players may hold more than one non-FIFA nationality.

No.	Pos.	Nation	Player
1	GK	SUI	Pascal Loretz
2	DF	SUI	Severin Ottiger
4	DF	SUI	Luca Jaquez
5	DF	SUI	Denis Simani
6	MF	SUI	Ardon Jashari
7	MF	GER	Max Meyer
10	MF	SUI	Kevin Spadanuda
11	MF	FRA	Teddy Okou
13	DF	CZE	Martin Frýdek
14	MF	SUI	Luuk Breedijk
16	MF	SVK	Jakub Kadák
17	FW	TOG	Thibault Klidjé
18	MF	SUI	Nicky Beloko

No.	Pos.	Nation	Player
20	DF	GER	Pius Dorn
21	FW	POR	Asumah Abubakar
22	DF	SUI	Dario Ulrich
23	DF	SUI	Mauricio Willimann
27	FW	SUI	Lars Villiger
30	DF	KOS	Ismajl Beka
32	MF	SUI	Nicolas Haas (on loan from Empoli)
33	DF	SUI	Leny Meyer
41	MF	SUI	Noah Rupp
44	GK	SUI	Diego Heller
69	MF	FRA	Sofyan Chader
90	GK	SRB	Vaso Vasić
99	FW	SUI	Kemal Ademi

=== Other players under contract ===
Note: Flags indicate national team as defined under FIFA eligibility rules; some limited exceptions apply. Players may hold more than one non-FIFA nationality.

No.	Pos.	Nation	Player
—	DF	SUI	Serkan Izmirlioglu
—	MF	SUI	Samuele Campo

No.	Pos.	Nation	Player
—	MF	SUI	Tyron Owusu

=== Out on loan ===
Note: Flags indicate national team as defined under FIFA eligibility rules; some limited exceptions apply. Players may hold more than one non-FIFA nationality.

No.	Pos.	Nation	Player
—	DF	SUI	Rúben Dantas Fernandes (at Wil until 30 June 2024)
—	DF	SUI	Thoma Monney (at Biel-Bienne until 30 June 2024)
—	MF	GHA	Samuel Alabi (at Baden until 30 June 2024)

No.	Pos.	Nation	Player
—	FW	SUI	Yvan Alounga (at Bellinzona until 30 June 2024)
—	FW	URU	Joaquín Ardaiz (at Şanlıurfaspor until 30 June 2024)
—	FW	GER	Varol Tasar (at Yverdon until 30 June 2024)
—	FW	SUI	Nando Toggenburger (at Thun until 30 June 2024)

== Transfers ==
=== In ===
Pos.	Player	Transferred from	Fee	Date	Source
FW	(Uruguay) Joaquín Ardaiz	(Turkey) Şanlıurfaspor	Loan return	7 December 2023	
MF	(Ghana) Samuel Alabi	(Switzerland) FC Baden	Loan return	31 December 2023	
DF	(Sweden) Jesper Löfgren	(Sweden) Djurgården	Loan	18 January 2024	
FW	(Austria) Adrian Grbić	(France) Lorient	Loan	5 February 2024	

=== Out ===
Pos.	Player	Transferred to	Fee	Date	Source

== Pre-season and friendlies ==
Win Draw Loss Fixtures

30 June 2023 Friendly	Luzern (Switzerland)	2–1	(Switzerland) FC Aarau	Schüpfheim
18:45 CEST (UTC+2)	Abubakar 49', 57'		Cvetković 13'	Stadium: Sportanlage Moosmättili

8 July 2023 Friendly	Rheindorf Altach (Austria)	0–2	(Switzerland) Luzern	Schruns, Austria
16:00 CEST (UTC+2)				Stadium: Sportplatz Golm

12 July 2023 Friendly	Luzern (Switzerland)	3–0	(Switzerland) Schaffhausen	Rothenburg
18:45 CEST (UTC+2)				Stadium: Sportplatz Chärnsmatt

15 July 2023 Friendly	Luzern (Switzerland)	3–1	(Netherlands) Excelsior	Lucerne
15:00 CEST (UTC+2)				Stadium: swissporarena

7 September 2023 Friendly	1899 Hoffenheim (Germany)	3–1	(Switzerland) Luzern	Hoffenheim, Germany
15:30 CEST (UTC+2)	Vogt 39' (pen.); Berisha 59'; Becker 64'		Ademi 29'	Stadium: Dietmar-Hopp-Stadion

9 January 2024 Friendly	Karlsruher SC (Germany)	3–1	(Switzerland) Luzern	Marbella, Spain
16:00 CET (UTC+1)	Zivzivadze 8'; Dettling 84'; Schleusener 90'		Ademi 66'	Stadium: Banús Football Center

12 January 2024 Friendly	Luzern (Switzerland)	1–2	(Belgium) Standard Liège	San Pedro de Alcántara, Spain
10:30 CET (UTC+1)	Meyer (penalty missed) 5'; Chader 7'		Kanga 14'; Ohio 84'	Stadium: Marbella Football Center - Sur 1

12 January 2024 Friendly	Luzern (Switzerland)	5–0	(Gibraltar) Lincoln Red Imps	San Pedro de Alcántara, Spain
15:00 CET (UTC+1)	Ademi 12'; Villiger 24', 38', 42'; Klidjé 51'			Stadium: Marbella Football Center - Sur 1

22 March 2024 Friendly	Luzern (Switzerland)	2–1	(Switzerland) Sion	Lucerne
14:00 CET (UTC+1)	Grbić 15'; Hegglin 87'		Chipperfield 67'	Stadium: swissporarena

== Competitions ==
=== Overall record ===
Competition	First match	Last match	Starting round	Final position	Record							
Competition	First match	Last match	Starting round	Final position	Pld	W	D	L	GF	GA	GD	Win %
Swiss Super League	22 July 2023	21 April 2024	Matchday 1		28	11	5	12	36	40	−4	39.29
Swiss Cup	20 August 2023	1 November 2023	First round	Round of 16	3	2	0	1	9	2	+7	66.67
Total					31	13	5	13	45	42	+3	41.94

Last updated: 17 March 2024
Source: Soccerway

=== Swiss Super League ===
==== League table ====
Pos	Team	Pld	W	D	L	GF	GA	GD	Pts	Qualification or relegation (Note: Teams played each other three times (33 matches), before the league was split into two groups (the top six and the bottom six).)
5	St. Gallen	38	16	9	13	60	51	+9	57	Qualification for the Conference League second qualifying round
6	Winterthur	38	13	10	15	60	71	−11	49	
7	Luzern	38	13	10	15	47	53	−6	49	
8	Basel	38	13	10	15	45	52	−7	49	
9	Yverdon-Sport	38	13	8	17	50	71	−21	47	

Source: Swiss Super League
Rules for classification: 1) Points; 2) Goal difference; 3) Goals scored; 4) Head-to-head goal difference; 5) Head-to-head goals scored 6) Away goals scored; 7) Draw.

==== Results summary ====
Overall								Home						Away					
Pld	W	D	L	GF	GA	GD	Pts	W	D	L	GF	GA	GD	W	D	L	GF	GA	GD
0	0	0	0	0	0	0	0	0	0	0	0	0	0	0	0	0	0	0	0

Last updated: November 2023.

==== Results by round ====
Round	1	2	3	4	5	6	7	8	9	10	11	12	13	14	15	16	17	18
Ground	A	H	A	H	A	H	H	A	H	A	H	A	H	A	H	A	A	H
Result	D	W	L	D	W	W	W	D	L	L	W	L	W	L	W	L	D	L
Position																		

Updated to match(es) played on 17 December 2023. Source:
A = Away; H = Home; W = Win; D = Draw; L = Loss; P = Postponed

==== Matches ====
The league fixtures were unveiled on 21 June 2023.

22 July 2023	Winterthur	0–0	Luzern	Winterthur
CET (UTC+1)				Stadium: Stadion Schützenwiese

30 July 2023	Luzern	2–1	Stade Lausanne Ouchy	Luzern
CET (UTC+1)				Stadium: Swissporarena

6 August 2023	St. Gallen	2–1	Luzern	St. Gallen
CET (UTC+1)				Stadium: Kybunpark

13 August 2023	Luzern	1–1	Young Boys	Luzern
CET (UTC+1)				Stadium: Swissporarena

27 August 20223	Grasshoppers	0–1	Luzern	Zürich
CET (UTC+1)				Stadium: Letzigrund

3 September 2023	Luzern	3–2	Lugano	Luzern
CET (UTC+1)				Stadium: Swissporarena

5 November 2023	Luzern	2–0	Grasshoppers	Luzern
CET (UTC+1)				Stadium: Swissporarena

11 November 2023	Young Boys	6–1	Luzern	Bern
CET (UTC+1)				Stadium: Stadion Wankdorf

25 November 2023	Luzern	3–1	Winterthur	Luzern
CET (UTC+1)				Stadium: Swissporarena

3 December 2023	Lugano	1–0	Luzern	Lugano
CET (UTC+1)				Stadium: Cornaredo Stadium

10 December 2023	Zürich	1–1	Luzern	Zürich
CET (UTC+1)				Stadium: Letzigrund

17 December 2023	Luzern	0–1	Basel	Luzern
CET (UTC+1)				Stadium: Swissporarena

23 January 2024	Yverdon-Sport	2–1	Luzern	Yverdon
CET (UTC+1)

28 January 2024	Luzern	2–1	Lausanne-Sport	Luzern
CET (UTC+1)				Stadium: Swissporarena

1 February 2024	Stade Lausanne Ouchy	0–3	Luzern	Lausanne
CET (UTC+1)

4 February 2024	Luzern	1–0	St. Gallen	Luzern
CET (UTC+1)				Stadium: Swissporarena

11 February 2024	Winterthur	2–1	Luzern	Winterthur
CET (UTC+1)				Stadium: Stadion Schützenwiese

18 February 2024	Luzern	0–1	Zürich	Luzern
CET (UTC+1)				Stadium: Swissporarena

24 February 2024	Grasshoppers	v	Luzern	Zürich
20:30 CET (UTC+1)				Stadium: Letzigrund

=== Swiss Cup ===
20 August 2023 First round	FC Winkeln	0–6	Luzern	St. Gallen
14:00 CEST (UTC+2)		Report	Villiger 10'; Ulrich 38'; Okou 42'; Willimann 55'; Meyer 59'; Rupp 90'	Stadium: Sportanlage Gründenmoos

16 September 2023 Second round	Thun	1–3 (a.e.t.)	Luzern	Thun
18:30 CEST (UTC+2)	Ndongo 38'; Bürki (yellow card) 54'; Dähler (yellow card) 59'	Report	Haas (yellow card) 27'; Meyer 55'; Ulrich (red card) 79'; Okou 93'; Jashari 112'	Stadium: Stockhorn Arena; Referee: Stefan Horisberger

1 November 2023 Round of 16	SR Delémont	1–0	Luzern	Delémont
20:30 CET (UTC+1)	Cesca (yellow card) 12'; Achour 33'; Coelho (yellow card) 66'; Wyder (yellow card) 67'; Mäder (yellow card) 89'; François (yellow card) 90+1'	Report	Frýdek (yellow card) 69'; Jaquez (yellow card) 76'	Stadium: La Blancherie; Referee: Mirel Turkes
