= 2024–25 FC Luzern season =

FC Luzern
2024–25 season
- President: Stefan Wolf
- Manager: Mario Frick
- Stadium: swissporarena
- Swiss Super League: 6th
- Swiss Cup: Round of 32
- Top goalscorer: League: Thibault Klidjé (10); All: Thibault Klidjé (12)
- Highest home attendance: 10,254 vs Servette
- Lowest home attendance: 8,513 vs Yverdon-Sport FC
- Average home league attendance: 11,757
- Biggest win: Vs FC Winterthur (4-3, 14 December 2024)
- Biggest defeat: Vs FC Sion (4-2, 10 November 2024)
Home colours	Away colours
- All statistics correct as of 24 May 2025.

The 2024–25 season was the 124th season in the history of FC Luzern, and the club's 19th consecutive season in the Swiss Super League. In addition to the domestic league, the team participated in the Swiss Cup.

== Transfers ==
=== In ===
Pos.	Player	Transferred from	Fee	Date	Source
DF	(Sweden) Jesper Löfgren	(Sweden) Djurgården	Undisclosed	1 July 2024	
FW	(Germany) Sinan Karweina	Austria Klagenfurt	Undisclosed	1 July 2024	
DF	(Latvia) Andrejs Cigaņiks	(Poland) Widzew Łódź	Undisclosed	5 July 2024	
DF	(Switzerland) Stefan Knežević	(Belgium) Charleroi	Free	13 July 2024	
MF	(Kosovo) Donat Rrudhani	(Switzerland) Young Boys	Loan	30 July 2024	

=== Out ===
Pos.	Player	Transferred to	Fee	Date	Source
MF	(Germany) Max Meyer	(Cyprus) APOEL	End of contract	1 July 2024	
MF	(Switzerland) Iwan Hegglin	(Switzerland) FC Schaffhausen	Loan	1 July 2024	
DF	(Mexico) Mauricio Willimann	(Switzerland) FC Schaffhausen	Loan	1 July 2024	
FW	(Switzerland) Kemal Ademi		Contract termination	1 July 2024	

== Friendlies ==
=== Pre-season ===
29 June 2024 Friendly	Luzern (Switzerland)	2–1	(Austria) Rheindorf Altach	Horw
13:30				Stadium: Terrain Seefeld 1

5 July 2024 Friendly	Luzern (Switzerland)	1–1	(Switzerland) FC Schaffhausen	Sempach
19:00				Stadium: Sportanlage Seeland

10 July 2024 Friendly	SC Cham (Switzerland)	0–2	(Switzerland) Luzern	Cham
18:45			Ottiger 18'; Stanković 67'	Stadium: Stadion Eizmoos

13 July 2024 Friendly	Luzern (Switzerland)	0–0	(Germany) VfB Stuttgart	Luzern
15:00				Stadium: Swissporarena; Attendance: 5,850

6 September 2024 Friendly	Vaduz (Liechtenstein)	1–0	(Switzerland) Luzern	Vaduz
14:00		Report		Stadium: Rheinpark Stadion

== Competitions ==
=== Overall record ===
Competition	First match	Last match	Starting round	Record							
Competition	First match	Last match	Starting round	Pld	W	D	L	GF	GA	GD	Win %
Swiss Super League	21 July 2024	22–24 May 2025	Matchday 1	3	1	1	1	4	4	+0	33.33
Swiss Cup	17 August 2024		17 August 2024	0	0	0	0	0	0	+0	—
Total				3	1	1	1	4	4	+0	33.33

Last updated: 3 August 2024
Source: Soccerway

=== Swiss Super League ===
==== League table ====
Pos	Team	Pld	W	D	L	GF	GA	GD	Pts	Qualification or relegation (Note: Teams play each other three times (33 matches), before the league is split into two groups (the top six and the bottom six).)
4	Lugano	38	15	9	14	55	58	−3	54	Qualification for the Europa League second qualifying round
5	Lausanne-Sport	38	14	11	13	62	54	+8	53	Qualification for the Conference League second qualifying round
6	Luzern	38	14	10	14	66	64	+2	52	
7	Zürich	38	15	8	15	56	57	−1	53	
8	St. Gallen	38	13	13	12	52	53	−1	52	

Source: Swiss Super League
Rules for classification: 1) Points; 2) Goal difference; 3) Goals scored; 4) Head-to-head goal difference; 5) Head-to-head goals scored 6) Away goals scored; 7) Draw.

==== Results summary ====
Overall								Home						Away					
Pld	W	D	L	GF	GA	GD	Pts	W	D	L	GF	GA	GD	W	D	L	GF	GA	GD
20	9	6	5	36	31	+5	33	5	2	3	17	13	+4	4	4	2	19	18	+1

Last updated: 26 January 2025.
Source: soccerway

==== Results by round ====
Round	1	2	3	4	5	6	7	8	9	10	11	12	13	14	15	16	17	18	19	20	21	22	23	24	25
Ground	H	A	H	A	H	A	A	H	H	A	H	A	H	A	H	A	H	A	A	H	H	A	H	A	H
Result	L	D	W	W	W	D	W	W	D	L	L	D	W	L	D	W	L	W	D	W					
Position	10	8	6	5	3	4	1	1	1	3	5	5	5	5	5	5	6	4	4	3					

Updated to match(es) played on 26 January 2025. Source:
A = Away; H = Home; W = Win; D = Draw; L = Loss

==== Matches ====
The match schedule was released on 18 June 2024.

21 July 2024 1	Luzern	1–2	Servette	Lucerne
16:30	Cigaņiks (yellow card) 36'; Meyer (yellow card) 37'; Medja (yellow card) 62'; Villiger 90+2'		Kutesa 4'; Rouiller 58'; Ondoua (yellow card) 70'; Baron (yellow card) 83'	Stadium: swissporarena Attendance: 10,254; Referee: Stefan Horisberger

27 July 2024 2	Grasshopper	2–2	Luzern	Zürich
18:00	Muci 54'; Schürpf 70'		Villiger 42'; Klidjé 85'	Stadium: Letzigrund; Attendance: 5,510; Referee: Luca Piccolo

3 August 2024 3	Luzern	1–0	Sion	Luzern
20:30	Beloko 85'			Stadium: Swissporarena; Attendance: 10,430; Referee: Fedayi San

11 August 2024 4	Lugano	2–3	Luzern	Lugano
16:30	Mahou 3'; Vladi 43'; Papadopoulos (yellow card) 60'; Mai (yellow card) 70'	Report	Dorn 12' (yellow card) 61'; Ottiger (yellow card) 55'; Klidjé 74' 88'	Stadium: Cornaredo Stadium; Attendance: 3,341; Referee: (Switzerland) Alessandro Dudic

24 August 2024 5	Luzern	3–0	Winterthur	Luzern
18:00 CET	Villiger 3' 51'; Karweina 77'; Beloko (yellow card) 89'	Report	Lekaj (yellow card) 33'; Schneider (yellow card) 41'; Diaby (yellow card) 68'; Fofana (yellow card) 80'; Chiappetta (yellow card) 90+6'; Krasniqi (yellow card) 90+6'	Stadium: Swissporarena; Attendance: 10,365; Referee: (Switzerland) Luca Cibelli

1 September 2024 6	Zürich	1–1	Luzern	Zürich
16:30 CET	Okita (yellow card) 16'; Daniel Denoon (yellow card) 40'; Sabobo (yellow card) 52'; Leidner (yellow card) 55'; Perea 56'	Report	Rrudhani (yellow card) 12'; Cigaņiks 21'; Knezevic (yellow card) 28'; Loretz (yellow card) 90+5'	Stadium: Stadion Letzigrund; Attendance: 16,191; Referee: (Switzerland) Johannes von Mandach

=== Swiss Cup ===
17 August 2024 First round	FC Mendrisio	1–4	Luzern	Mendrisio
18:00	Stefano Gibellini 26'	Report	Klidjé 2' 21'; Villiger 29'; Kadák 65'	Stadium: Campo comunale Mendrisio; Attendance: 2,152; Referee: (Switzerland) Luca Piccolo

15 September 2024 Second round	Aarau	1–0	Luzern	Aarau
16:00 CET	Milot Avdyli (yellow card) 54'; Obexer (yellow card) 60' (yellow-red card) 90+6'; Jäckle (yellow card) 75'; Toure 82'; Marvin Hübel (yellow card) 90+5'	Report	Rrudhani (yellow card) 17' (yellow-red card) 70'	Stadium: Stadion Brügglifeld; Attendance: 8,450; Referee: (Switzerland) Fedayi San
