= 2021–22 FC Luzern season =

Luzern
2021–22 season
- Chairman: Stefan Wolf
- Manager: Fabio Celestini
- Stadium: Swissporarena
- Swiss Super League: 9th
- Swiss Cup: Semi-finals
- UEFA Europa Conference League: Third qualifying round
- Top goalscorer: League: Filip Ugrinic (8); All: Filip Ugrinic (10)

The 2021–22 season was the 97th season in the existence of FC Luzern and the club's 26th consecutive season in the top flight of Swiss football. In addition to the domestic league, FC Luzern participated in this season's editions of the Swiss Cup and the UEFA Europa Conference League.

== Players ==
=== First-team squad ===
As of 2 February 2022

Note: Flags indicate national team as defined under FIFA eligibility rules; some limited exceptions apply. Players may hold more than one non-FIFA nationality.

No.	Pos.	Nation	Player
2	DF	TUN	Mohamed Dräger (on loan from Nottingham Forest)
4	MF	GER	Christian Gentner
5	DF	ALB	Denis Simani
6	MF	NED	Jordy Wehrmann
7	MF	SEN	Ibrahima Ndiaye
8	MF	GER	Tsiy-William Ndenge
9	FW	SRB	Dejan Sorgić
10	MF	SUI	Samuele Campo
11	MF	SUI	Pascal Schürpf
13	DF	CZE	Martin Frýdek
14	DF	SUI	Serkan Izmirlioglu
15	MF	GER	Marvin Schulz
16	MF	GER	Varol Tasar
17	DF	SUI	Simon Grether

No.	Pos.	Nation	Player
19	MF	SUI	Filip Ugrinic
20	FW	SRB	Nikola Čumić (on loan from Olympiacos)
21	FW	POR	Asumah Abubakar
23	MF	GHA	Samuel Alabi
31	MF	KOS	Lorik Emini
32	GK	GER	Marius Müller
34	DF	SUI	Silvan Sidler
38	GK	SUI	Pascal Loretz
41	MF	SUI	Noah Rupp
46	DF	SUI	Marco Burch
74	DF	SUI	Luca Jaquez
74	DF	SUI	Severin Ottiger
75	DF	SUI	Thoma Monney
90	GK	SRB	Vaso Vasić

=== Other players under contract ===
Note: Flags indicate national team as defined under FIFA eligibility rules; some limited exceptions apply. Players may hold more than one non-FIFA nationality.

No.	Pos.	Nation	Player
—	MF	SUI	Tyron Owusu

=== Out on loan ===
Note: Flags indicate national team as defined under FIFA eligibility rules; some limited exceptions apply. Players may hold more than one non-FIFA nationality.

No.	Pos.	Nation	Player
—	GK	SUI	Loïc Jacot (at Wohlen until 30 June 2022)
—	DF	SUI	Ashvin Balaruban (at Kriens until 30 June 2022)
—	MF	SUI	Lino Lang (at Kriens until 30 June 2022)
—	MF	SUI	David Mistrafović (at Kriens until 30 June 2022)

No.	Pos.	Nation	Player
—	FW	CMR	Yvan Alounga (at Schaffhausen until 30 June 2022)
—	FW	SUI	Aziz Binous (at Kriens until 30 June 2022)
—	FW	KOS	Mark Marleku (at Kriens until 30 June 2022)

== Pre-season and friendlies ==
Win Draw Loss Fixtures

30 June 2021 Friendly	Luzern (Switzerland)	2–4	(Switzerland) Kriens	Lucerne, Switzerland
18:00 CEST (UTC+2)				Stadium: Sportplatz Tribschen

3 July 2021 Friendly	Winterthur (Switzerland)	1–3	(Switzerland) Luzern	Winterthur, Switzerland
13:00 CEST (UTC+2)				Stadium: Stadion Schützenwiese

7 July 2021 Friendly	Luzern (Switzerland)	3–3	(Ukraine) Dynamo Kyiv	Lucerne, Switzerland
16:00 CEST (UTC+2)	Sorgic 9', 63'; Ugrinic 16'		Lednev 56'; Antyukh 81'; Harmash 88'	Stadium: swissporarena

10 July 2021 Friendly	Grasshoppers (Switzerland)	0–2	(Switzerland) Luzern	Niederhasli, Switzerland
14:00 CEST (UTC+2)				Stadium: GC/Campus

17 July 2021 Friendly	Luzern (Switzerland)	2–0	(Switzerland) Wil	Switzerland
14:15 CEST (UTC+2)	Gentner 60'; Ndiaye 67'

15 January 2022 Friendly	Luzern (Switzerland)	0–1	(Switzerland) Winterthur	Lucerne, Switzerland
14:30 CET (UTC+1)				Stadium: Swissporarena

22 January 2022 Friendly	Luzern (Switzerland)	2–2	(Austria) Rheindorf Altach	Lucerne, Switzerland
14:30 CET (UTC+1)				Stadium: Swissporarena

25 March 2022 Friendly	Luzern (Switzerland)	4–1	(Switzerland) Schaffhausen	Lucerne, Switzerland
12:00 CET (UTC+1)				Stadium: Swissporarena

== Competitions ==
=== Overall record ===
Competition	First match	Last match	Starting round	Final position	Record							
Competition	First match	Last match	Starting round	Final position	Pld	W	D	L	GF	GA	GD	Win %
Swiss Super League	24 July 2021	22 May 2022	Matchday 1	9th	36	9	13	14	54	65	−11	25.00
Relegation play-offs	26 May 2022	29 May 2022	First leg	Winners	2	1	1	0	4	2	+2	50.00
Swiss Cup	15 August 2021	21 April 2022	Round 1	Semi-finals	5	4	1	0	12	5	+7	80.00
UEFA Europa Conference League	5 August 2021	12 August 2021	Third qualifying round	Third qualifying round	2	0	0	2	0	6	−6	0.00
Total					45	14	15	16	70	78	−8	31.11

Source: Soccerway

=== Swiss Super League ===
==== League table ====
Pos	Team	Pld	W	D	L	GF	GA	GD	Pts	Qualification or relegation
6	Servette	36	12	8	16	50	66	−16	44	
7	Sion	36	11	8	17	46	67	−21	41	
8	Grasshopper	36	9	13	14	54	58	−4	40	
9	Luzern (O)	36	9	13	14	52	64	−12	40	Qualification for Relegation play-offs
10	Lausanne-Sport (R)	36	4	10	22	37	76	−39	22	Relegation to Swiss Challenge League

Source: Swiss Super League
Rules for classification: 1) Points; 2) Goal difference; 3) Goals scored; 4) Head-to-head goal difference; 5) Away goals scored; 6) Draw.
(O) Play-off winners; (R) Relegated

==== Results summary ====
Overall								Home						Away					
Pld	W	D	L	GF	GA	GD	Pts	W	D	L	GF	GA	GD	W	D	L	GF	GA	GD
30	5	12	13	37	56	−19	27	4	3	8	18	27	−9	1	9	5	19	29	−10

Last updated: 18 April 2022.
Source: Swiss Super League

==== Results by round ====
Round	1	2	3	4	5	6	7	8	9	10	11	12	13	14	15	16	17	18	19	20	21	22	23	24	25	26	27	28	29	30	31
Ground	H	A	H	A	H	H	A	H	A	A	H	A	H	A	H	A	A	H	H	A	H	A	A	H	A	H	A	H	A	H	A
Result	L	D	L	L	D	D	D	L	D	D	W	D	L	L	L	L	D	L	L	L	W	D	W	L	D	W	L	D	D	W	
Position	6																														

Updated to match(es) played on 18 April 2022. Source: Swiss Super League
A = Away; H = Home; W = Win; D = Draw; L = Loss

==== Matches ====
The league fixtures were announced on 24 June 2021.

24 July 2021 1	Luzern	3–4	Young Boys	Lucerne
18:00 CEST (UTC+2)	Schürpf 27', 52'; Ndiaye 41'		Elia 14', 59'; Siebatcheu 68', 90+3'	Stadium: Swissporarena; Referee: Fedayi San

1 August 2021 2	St. Gallen	2–2	Luzern	St. Gallen
14:15 CEST (UTC+2)				Stadium: Kybunpark

8 August 2021 3	Luzern	1–3	Zürich	Lucerne
16:30 CEST (UTC+2)				Stadium: Swissporarena

22 August 2021 4	Servette	4–1	Luzern	Geneva
16:30 CEST (UTC+2)				Stadium: Stade de Genève

29 August 2021 5	Luzern	1–1	Lausanne-Sport	Lucerne
14:15 CEST (UTC+2)				Stadium: Swissporarena

11 September 2021 6	Luzern	1–1	Grasshoppers	Lucerne
18:00 CEST (UTC+2)				Stadium: Swissporarena

23 September 2021 7	Sion	1–1	Luzern	Sion
20:30 CEST (UTC+2)				Stadium: Stade Tourbillon

26 September 2021 8	Luzern	2–3	Lugano	Lucerne
14:15 CEST (UTC+2)		Report		Stadium: Swissporarena

3 October 2021 9	Basel	1–1	Luzern	Basel
16:30 CEST (UTC+2)	Frei (yellow card) 64'; Stocker 68'; Cömert (yellow card) 90'	Report	Sorgić (yellow card) 34'; Wehrmann 78'	Stadium: St. Jakob-Park; Attendance: 20,883; Referee: Alessandro Dudic

16 October 2021 10	Young Boys	1–1	Luzern	Bern
18:00 CEST (UTC+2)	Martins (yellow card) 29' (yellow-red card) 39'; Fassnacht (yellow card) 41'; von Ballmoos (yellow card) 79'; Sierro (yellow card) 86'; Ngamaleu 90+4'	Report	Schulz 30' (pen.); Ugrinic (yellow card) 73'; Grether (yellow card) 81'	Stadium: Stade de Suisse; Attendance: 26,336; Referee: Stefan Horisberger

24 October 2021 11	Luzern	2–0	St. Gallen	Lucerne
14:15 CEST (UTC+2)		Report		Stadium: Swissporarena

31 October 2021 12	Lausanne-Sport	1–1	Luzern	Lausanne
16:30 CET (UTC+1)		Report		Stadium: Stade de la Tuilière

6 November 2021 13	Luzern	0–1	Sion	Lucerne
20:30 CET (UTC+1)		Report		Stadium: Swissporarena

21 November 2021 14	Lugano	3–1	Luzern	Lugano
16:30 CET (UTC+1)		Report		Stadium: Stadio Cornaredo

28 November 2021 15	Luzern	1–3	Basel	Lucerne
16:30 CET (UTC+1)		Report		Stadium: Swissporarena

4 December 2021 16	Zürich	4–0	Luzern	Zürich
18:00 CET (UTC+1)		Report		Stadium: Letzigrund

12 December 2021 17	Grasshoppers	1–1	Luzern	Zürich
16:30 CET (UTC+1)		Report		Stadium: Letzigrund

18 December 2021 18	Luzern	0–2	Servette	Lucerne
20:30 CET (UTC+1)		Report	Stevanović 19' (pen.); Vouilloz 61'	Stadium: Swissporarena; Referee: Fedayi San

30 January 2022 19	Luzern	0–3	Basel	Lucerne
16:30 CET (UTC+1)	Čumić (yellow card) 21'; Müller (yellow card) 60'; Schulz (yellow card) 75' (yellow-red card) 78'; Jashari (yellow card) 78'	Report	(yellow card) 31' Palacios; 49' (pen.) Frei; (yellow card) 52' Katterbach; (yellow card) 66' Pelmard; (yellow card) 76' Burger; 85' Males; (yellow card) 90+5' Frei; 90+7' Frei	Stadium: Swissporarena; Attendance: 10,779; Referee: (Switzerland) Lukas Fähndrich

6 February 2022 20	Lugano	2–1	Luzern	Lugano
16:30 CET (UTC+1)		Report		Stadium: Stadio Cornaredo

13 February 2022 21	Luzern	1–0	Sion	Lucerne
16:30 CET (UTC+1)	Abubakar 57'	Report		Stadium: Swissporarena; Attendance: 8,973; Referee: Alain Bieri

20 February 2022 22	Servette	1–1	Luzern	Geneva
16:30 CET (UTC+1)	Bedia 53'	Report	Kvasina 86'	Stadium: Stade de Genève; Attendance: 6,297; Referee: Urs Schnyder

27 February 2022 23	Lausanne-Sport	1–2	Luzern	Lausanne
16:30 CET (UTC+1)	Kukuruzović 90+1'	Report	Abubakar 2', 72'	Stadium: Stade de la Tuilière; Attendance: 6,256; Referee: Fedayi San

2 March 2022 24	Luzern	0–2	Zürich	Lucerne
20:30 CET (UTC+1)				Stadium: Swissporarena; Referee: Sandro Schärer

5 March 2022 25	Young Boys	2–2	Luzern	Bern
18:00 CET (UTC+1)				Stadium: Stade de Suisse; Referee: Lukas Fähndrich

13 March 2022 26	Luzern	1–0	Grasshoppers	Lucerne
16:00 CET (UTC+1)				Stadium: Swissporarena

19 March 2022 27	St. Gallen	3–2	Luzern	St. Gallen
18:00 CET (UTC+1)	Schmidt 12'; Görtler 21'; Duah 37'	SFL summary	6' Čumić; 9' Burch	Stadium: Kybunpark; Attendance: 17,848; Referee: (Switzerland) Luca Cibelli

3 April 2022 28	Luzern	2–2	Lugano	Lucerne
14:15 CEST (UTC+2)				Stadium: Swissporarena

9 April 2022 29	Grasshoppers	2–2	Luzern	Zürich
20:30 CEST (UTC+2)		SFL summary		Stadium: Letzigrund; Attendance: 5,049; Referee: (Switzerland) Fedayi San (Gebenstorf)

19 March 2022 30	Luzern	3–2	St. Gallen	Swissporarena, Luzern
18:00	Schulz 75'; Dejan Sorgić 84'; Ndiaye 90+1'	SFL summary	13' Ruiz; 83' Fazliji	Attendance: 13,491; Referee: (Switzerland) Sandro Schärer (Buttikon)

24 April 2022 31	Basel	3–2	Luzern	Basel
16:30 CEST (UTC+2)	Stocker 3'; Stocker (yellow card) 4'; Tavares (yellow card) 18'; Stocker 73'; Chalov 87'	SFL summary	(yellow card) 51' Grether; (yellow card) 67' Sorgić	Stadium: St. Jakob-Park; Attendance: 21,905; Referee: Urs Schnyder

1 May 2022 32	Luzern	3–0	Lausanne-Sport	Lucerne
16:30 CEST (UTC+2)				Stadium: Swissporarena; Attendance: 10,419; Referee: Luca Cibelli

8 May 2022 33	Luzern	4–0	Servette	Lucerne
16:30 CEST (UTC+2)				Stadium: Swissporarena; Attendance: 11,596; Referee: Stefan Horisberger

11 May 2022 34	Sion	1–3	Luzern	Sion
20:30 CEST (UTC+2)				Stadium: Stade Tourbillon; Attendance: 9,600; Referee: Sandro Schärer

19 May 2022 35	Luzern	2–2	Young Boys	Lucerne
20:30 CEST (UTC+2)				Stadium: Swissporarena; Attendance: 12,113; Referee: Urs Schnyder

22 May 2022 36	Zürich	2–3	Luzern	Zürich
16:30 CEST (UTC+2)				Stadium: Letzigrund; Attendance: 22,413; Referee: Sandro Schärer

==== Relegation play-offs ====
26 May 2022 First leg	Schaffhausen	2–2	Luzern	Schaffhausen
18:00	Bobadilla 14'; Del Toro 71'	Report	Schulz 4' (pen.); Jashari 53'	Stadium: wefox Arena; Attendance: 8,143; Referee: Fedayi San

29 May 2022 Second leg	Luzern	2–0 (4–2 agg.)	Schaffhausen	Lucerne
16:30	Schulz 20' (pen.); Ugrinic 70'	Report		Stadium: Swissporarena; Attendance: 15,500; Referee: Sandro Schärer

=== Swiss Cup ===
15 August 2021 Round 1	SC Cham	0–1	Luzern	Cham
16:00 CEST (UTC+1)		Report	Ndiaye 45+1'	Stadium: Stadion Eizmoos

18 September 2021 Round 2	SC Buochs	1–2 (a.e.t.)	Luzern	Buochs
18:00 CEST (UTC+1)	Neziraj 69' (pen.)	Report	Sorgic 45'; Ugrinic 94'	Stadium: Stadion Seefeld

27 October 2021 Round 3	Schaffhausen	0–2	Luzern	Schaffhausen
20:15 CEST (UTC+1)		Report	Ndiaye 30'; Tasar 88'	Stadium: LIPO Park Schaffhausen; Attendance: 1586

9 February 2022 Quarter-finals	Biel-Bienne	0–5	Luzern	Biel/Bienne
20:30		Report	Emini 13', 82'; Sorgić 44'; Dräger 45+1'; Campo 68'	Stadium: Tissot Arena; Attendance: 2828

21 April 2022 Semi-finals	Lugano	2–2 (a.e.t.) (4–3 p)	Luzern	Lugano
19:45 CEST (UTC+2)				Stadium: Stadio Cornaredo

=== UEFA Europa Conference League ===
==== Third qualifying round ====
The draw for the third qualifying round was held on 19 July 2021.

5 August 2021 First leg	Luzern (Switzerland)	0–3	(Netherlands) Feyenoord	Lucerne, Switzerland
20:30 CEST (UTC+2)		Report	Til 9', 39'; Sinisterra 84'	Stadium: Swissporarena; Attendance: 5,069; Referee: Alejandro Hernández (Spain)

12 August 2021 Second leg	Feyenoord (Netherlands)	3–0 (6–0 agg.)	(Switzerland) Luzern	Rotterdam, Netherlands
20:00 CEST (UTC+2)	Jahanbakhsh 9', 34'; Sinisterra 48'	Report		Stadium: De Kuip; Attendance: 32,087; Referee: Marco Guida (Italy)
