= Marco Burch =

Swiss footballer (born 2000)

Personal information
- Date of birth: 19 October 2000 (age 26)
- Place of birth: Sarnen, Switzerland
- Height: 1.86 m (6 ft 1 in)
- Position: Centre-back

Team information
- Current team: Servette
- Number: 15

Youth career
- 2008–2011: FC Alpnach
- 2011–2018: FC Luzern

Senior career*
| Years | Team | Apps | (Gls) |
| 2018–2023 | FC Luzern | 87 | (7) |
| 2023–2026 | Legia Warsaw | 13 | (0) |
| 2023–2024 | Legia Warsaw II | 10 | (0) |
| 2025 | → Radomiak Radom (loan) | 12 | (3) |
| 2026– | Servette | 27 | (2) |

International career
| 2021–2023 | Switzerland U21 | 13 | (1) |
- * Club domestic league appearances and goals as of 28 September 2026

Marco Burch (born 19 October 2000) is a Swiss professional footballer who plays as a centre-back for Swiss Super League club Servette.

== Career statistics ==
As of match played 25 January 2026

Appearances and goals by club, season and competition
| Club | Season | League | | | National cup (Note: Includes Swiss Cup) | | Continental | | Other | | Total | |
| Club | Season | Division | Apps | Goals | Apps | Goals | Apps | Goals | Apps | Goals | Apps | Goals |
|---|---|---|---|---|---|---|---|---|---|---|---|---|
| Luzern | 2019–20 | Swiss Super League | 7 | 0 | 0 | 0 | 0 | 0 | 0 | 0 | 7 | 0 |
| Luzern | 2020–21 | Swiss Super League | 18 | 1 | 4 | 1 | 0 | 0 | 0 | 0 | 22 | 2 |
| Luzern | 2021–22 | Swiss Super League | 34 | 3 | 5 | 0 | 2 (Note: Appearance(s) in UEFA Conference League) | 0 | 2 | 0 | 43 | 3 |
| Luzern | 2022–23 | Swiss Super League | 25 | 3 | 2 | 0 | 0 | 0 | 0 | 0 | 27 | 3 |
| Luzern | 2023–24 | Swiss Super League | 3 | 0 | 0 | 0 | 4 | 1 | 0 | 0 | 7 | 1 |
| Luzern | Total | | 87 | 7 | 11 | 1 | 6 | 1 | 2 | 0 | 106 | 9 |
| Legia Warsaw | 2023–24 | Ekstraklasa | 7 | 0 | 0 | 0 | 1 | 0 | 0 | 0 | 8 | 0 |
| Legia Warsaw | 2024–25 | Ekstraklasa | 1 | 0 | 0 | 0 | 0 | 0 | — | | 1 | 0 |
| Legia Warsaw | 2025–26 | Ekstraklasa | 5 | 0 | 0 | 0 | 2 | 0 | 0 | 0 | 7 | 0 |
| Legia Warsaw | Total | | 13 | 0 | 0 | 0 | 3 | 0 | 0 | 0 | 16 | 0 |
| Legia Warsaw II | 2023–24 | III liga, gr. I | 3 | 0 | 0 | 0 | — | | — | | 3 | 0 |
| Legia Warsaw II | 2024–25 | III liga, gr. I | 7 | 0 | — | | — | | — | | 7 | 0 |
| Legia Warsaw II | Total | | 10 | 0 | 0 | 0 | — | | — | | 10 | 0 |
| Radomiak Radom (loan) | 2024–25 | Ekstraklasa | 12 | 3 | — | | — | | — | | 12 | 3 |
| Servette | 2025–26 | Swiss Super League | 2 | 1 | — | | — | | — | | 2 | 1 |
| Total | | | 124 | 11 | 11 | 1 | 9 | 1 | 2 | 0 | 146 | 13 |

== Honours ==
FC Luzern

- Swiss Cup: 2020–21

Individual

- Swiss Super League Team of the Season: 2022–23
