= Martin Frýdek (footballer, born 1992) =

Czech footballer

Personal information
- Date of birth: 24 March 1992 (age 34)
- Place of birth: Hradec Králové, Czechoslovakia
- Height: 1.79 m (5 ft 10 in)
- Positions: Midfielder; left back

Team information
- Current team: Sparta Prague B
- Number: 11

Youth career
- Sparta Prague

Senior career*
Years	Team	Apps	(Gls)
2012	Sparta Prague	2	(0)
2012	→ Senica (loan)	15	(0)
2013–2015	Slovan Liberec	64	(2)
2015–2020	Sparta Prague	103	(7)
2020–2024	Luzern	113	(3)
2024–2026	Aris	34	(0)
2026–	Sparta Prague B	0	(0)

International career^{‡}
2012	Czech Republic U20	1	(0)
2013–2015	Czech Republic U21	12	(1)
2016–2019	Czech Republic	7	(0)
- * Club domestic league appearances and goals as of 14 June 2026 ‡ National team caps and goals as of 29 August 2020

Martin Frýdek (born 24 March 1992) is a Czech footballer who plays as a defender for Bohemian Football League club Sparta Prague B.

== Club career ==
On 9 January 2013, Frýdek moved from Sparta Prague to Slovan Liberec with David Pavelka, with midfielder Lukáš Vácha going in the opposite direction for 15 million CZK. Frýdek was part of Slovan Liberec squad for 2013–14 UEFA Europa League group stage matches.

Frýdek returned to Sparta Prague in July 2015 as part of a swap transfer with Jan Sýkora. In March 2016 Frýdek scored the opening goal in the round of 16 first leg of the Europa League match against Lazio, which ended in a 1–1 draw, describing it as "the most beautiful goal I've ever scored". In a May 2016 league game against FK Teplice he suffered a severe concussion after a fight with Martin Fillo.

== International career ==
In October 2015, Frýdek received his first call-up to the Czech senior squad for a UEFA Euro 2016 qualifying against the Netherlands. He debuted on 24 March 2016 in a friendly match against Scotland, ending in a 0–1 defeat for the Czechs. Frýdek was not selected for the UEFA Euro 2016 due to a head injury at the end of the 2015–16 Czech First League.

== Personal life ==
Frýdek the son of former national team player and namesake Martin Frýdek. His brother, Christián Frýdek, is also a footballer.

== Career statistics ==
=== Club ===
As of 5 July 2026

Club	Season	League			Cup		Continental		Other		Total	
Club	Season	Division	Apps	Goals	Apps	Goals	Apps	Goals	Apps	Goals	Apps	Goals
Sparta Prague	2011–12	Czech First League	2	0	0	0	—		—		2	0
Senica (loan)	2012–13	Niké liga	15	0	2	0	2	0	—		19	0
Slovan Liberec	2012–13	Czech First League	14	0	4	0	—		—		18	0
Slovan Liberec	2013–14	Czech First League	25	0	1	0	13	1	—		39	1
Slovan Liberec	2014–15	Czech First League	25	2	7	3	2	0	—		34	5
Slovan Liberec	Total		64	2	12	3	15	1	—		91	6
Sparta Prague	2015–16	Czech First League	22	0	4	0	13	2	—		39	2
Sparta Prague	2016–17	Czech First League	9	2	0	0	6	0	—		15	2
Sparta Prague	2017–18	Czech First League	21	1	0	0	2	0	—		23	1
Sparta Prague	2018–19	Czech First League	33	2	3	0	2	0	—		38	2
Sparta Prague	2019–20	Czech First League	25	2	5	1	—		—		30	3
Sparta Prague	Total		110	7	12	1	23	2	—		145	10
Luzern	2020–21	Swiss Super League	30	0	4	0	—		—		34	0
Luzern	2021–22	Swiss Super League	27	0	4	0	2	0	—		33	0
Luzern	2022–23	Swiss Super League	29	3	2	0	—		—		31	3
Luzern	2023–24	Swiss Super League	27	0	1	0	4	0	—		32	0
Luzern	Total		113	3	11	0	6	0	—		130	3
Aris	2024–25	Superleague Greece	15	0	2	0	—		—		17	0
Aris	2025–26	Superleague Greece	19	0	3	0	2	0	—		24	0
Aris	Total		34	0	5	0	2	0	—		41	0
Career total			338	12	42	5	48	3	0	0	428	20

== Honours ==
- Slovan Liberec: 2014–15 Czech Cup

Individual

- Swiss Super League Player of the Month: April 2023
