= Pascal Loretz =

Swiss footballer (born 2003)

Personal information
- Full name: Pascal David Loretz
- Date of birth: 1 June 2003 (age 23)
- Place of birth: Lucerne, Switzerland
- Height: 1.88 m (6 ft 2 in)
- Position: Goalkeeper

Team information
- Current team: Hannover 96
- Number: 1

Youth career
- 2010–2014: Kriens
- 2014–2021: Luzern

Senior career*
Years	Team	Apps	(Gls)
2020–2021	Luzern U21	15	(0)
2021–2026	Luzern	121	(0)
2026–	Hannover 96	0	(0)

International career^{‡}
2021	Switzerland U19	4	(0)
2023–2024	Switzerland U21	6	(0)
- * Club domestic league appearances and goals as of 9 July 2026 ‡ National team caps and goals as of 21 October 2025

Pascal David Loretz (born 1 June 2003) is a Swiss professional footballer who plays as a goalkeeper for German 2. Bundesliga club Hannover 96.

== Career ==
Loretz is a youth product of Kriens, and moved to Luzern's youth academy in 2014. He started appearing with their reserves in 2020. On 11 June 2021, he signed his first professional contract with Luzern. He made his professional debut with Luzern in a 1–1 Swiss Super League tie with Young Boys on 5 February 2023 after injuries to the two goalkeepers ahead in the pecking order. On 22 June 2023, he was promoted as the team's primary goalkeeper and extended his contract with Luzern until 2027. He was named player of the month in the Swiss Super League for August 2023.

Loretz joined 2. Bundesliga club Hannover 96 ahead of the 2026–27 season on a four-year contract.

== International career ==
Loretz is a youth international for Switzerland. He was called up to the Switzerland U21s in 2023.

He was called up to the senior Switzerland squad in March 2025.

== Career statistics ==
As of match played 16 May 2026

Appearances and goals by club, season and competition
Club	Season	League			National cup		Continental		Other		Total	
Club	Season	Division	Apps	Goals	Apps	Goals	Apps	Goals	Apps	Goals	Apps	Goals
Luzern	2021–22	Swiss Super League	0	0	0	0	0	0	—		0	0
Luzern	2022–23	Swiss Super League	8	0	0	0	—		—		8	0
Luzern	2023–24	Swiss Super League	37	0	3	0	4	0	—		44	0
Luzern	2024–25	Swiss Super League	38	0	2	0	—		—		40	0
Luzern	2025–26	Swiss Super League	38	0	3	0	—		—		41	0
Luzern	Total		121	0	8	0	4	0	0	0	133	0
Hannover 96	2026–27	2. Bundesliga	0	0	0	0	—		—		0	0
Career total			121	0	8	0	4	0	0	0	133	0
