= Mohamed Dräger =

Footballer (born 1996)

Personal information
- Full name: Mohamed Dräger
- Date of birth: 25 June 1996 (age 30)
- Place of birth: Freiburg im Breisgau, Germany
- Height: 1.80 m (5 ft 11 in)
- Position: Right-back

Team information
- Current team: Espérance de Tunis
- Number: 13

Youth career
- –2009: PSV Freiburg
- 2009–2018: SC Freiburg

Senior career*
Years	Team	Apps	(Gls)
2012–2013	SC Freiburg U17	26	(7)
2013–2015	SC Freiburg U19	46	(16)
2015–2018	SC Freiburg II	68	(11)
2017–2020	SC Freiburg	2	(0)
2018–2020	→ SC Paderborn (loan)	50	(1)
2020–2021	Olympiacos	8	(0)
2021–2023	Nottingham Forest	0	(0)
2022–2023	→ Luzern (loan)	50	(6)
2023–2025	Basel	21	(2)
2025–2026	Eintracht Braunschweig	5	(0)
2025	Eintracht Braunschweig II	11	(0)
2026–	Espérance de Tunis	12	(0)

International career^{‡}
2013	Tunisia U17	4	(1)
2018–	Tunisia	39	(3)
Medal record
Men's football
Representing Tunisia
FIFA Arab Cup
Runner-up	2021 Qatar
- * Club domestic league appearances and goals as of 22 November 2026 ‡ National team caps and goals as of 17 October 2023

Mohamed Dräger (Arabic: مُحَمَّد دراغر; born 25 June 1996) is a professional footballer who plays as a right-back for Tunisian Ligue Professionnelle 1 club Espérance de Tunis. Born in Germany, he plays for the Tunisia national team.

== Club career ==
Born in Freiburg im Breisgau, Germany, to a German father and Tunisian mother, Dräger played his youth football with local Freiburg Police Sports Club and in 2009 he moved to the youth department of SC Freiburg. With the club's A youth team, he won the DFB-Pokal youth Cup in 2014. They won the final with an 8–7 win on penalties against FC Schalke 04, with Dräger being one of the successful penalty takers. After being the most dangerous player in the Freiburg youth team in the 2014–15 A-Junior Bundesliga with 15 goals during that season, he advanced to their second team in 2015. In the 2016–17 season, they managed direct promotion back to the Regionalliga Südwest as the Baden-Württemberg league champion. Dräger played mainly for the second team, but he made his professional debut for SC Freiburg on 27 July 2017, in a UEFA Europa League qualifying match against Slovenian club Domžale, coming on as a substitute in the 87th minute for Mike Frantz.

In 2018, Dräger joined SC Paderborn on a two-year loan. In September 2020, he joined Greek club Olympiacos on a transfer fee in the range of €1 million.

On 31 August 2021, Dräger joined EFL Championship side Nottingham Forest for an undisclosed fee. On 2 February 2022, Dräger moved on loan to Swiss Super League club Luzern, with an option to buy. After the loan period, Luzern did not pull the option.

On 25 August 2023, FC Basel announced they had signed Dräger on a three-year contract. He joined Basel's first team for their 2023–24 season under head coach Timo Schultz. Dräger played his domestic league debut for the club in the home game in the St. Jakob-Park on 3 September as Basel played a 2–2 draw with Zürich. He scored his first goal for his new team in the home game on 5 November 2023 as Basel won 2–1 against Yverdon.

On 30 January 2025, Dräger signed a one-and-a-half-year contract with Eintracht Braunschweig in 2. Bundesliga.

On 11 January 2026, Dräger moved to Espérance de Tunis in Tunisia for two and a half seasons.

== International career ==
Dräger made his debut for the Tunisia national team on 20 November 2018, in a friendly against Morocco, as a 79th-minute substitute for Naïm Sliti, and scored on 13 October 2020 his first goal in a 1–1 friendly game draw away to Nigeria.

In November 2022, Dräger was named in Tunisia's 26-man squad for the 2022 FIFA World Cup in Qatar.

== Career statistics ==
=== Club ===
As of match played 22 November 2026

Appearances and goals by club, season and competition
Club	Season	League			National cup (Note: Includes DFB-Pokal der Junioren, DFB-Pokal, Greek Football Cup, FA Cup, Swiss Cup, Tunisian Cup)		Continental		Other		Total	
Club	Season	Division	Apps	Goals	Apps	Goals	Apps	Goals	Apps	Goals	Apps	Goals
SC Freiburg U17	2012–13	Under 17 Bundesliga	26	7	—		—		—		26	7
SC Freiburg U19	2013–14	Under 19 Bundesliga	22	1	5	0	—		—		27	1
SC Freiburg U19	2014–15	Under 19 Bundesliga	24	15	1	0	—		—		25	15
SC Freiburg U19	Total		46	16	6	0	—		—		52	16
SC Freiburg II	2014–15	Regionalliga	4	0	—		—		—		4	0
SC Freiburg II	2015–16	Regionalliga	18	1	—		—		—		18	1
SC Freiburg II	2016–17	Oberliga Baden-Württemberg	20	2	—		—		—		20	2
SC Freiburg II	2017–18	Regionalliga	26	8	—		—		—		26	8
SC Freiburg II	Total		68	11	—		—		—		68	11
SC Freiburg	2017–18	Bundesliga	2	0	0	0	1 (Note: Appearance in UEFA Europa League)	0	—		3	0
SC Paderborn (loan)	2018–19	2. Bundesliga	32	0	4	0	—		—		36	0
SC Paderborn (loan)	2019–20	Bundesliga	18	1	0	0	—		—		18	1
SC Paderborn (loan)	Total		50	1	4	0	—		—		54	1
Olympiacos	2020–21	Super League Greece	8	0	1	0	1 (Note: Appearance in UEFA Champions League)	0	—		10	0
Nottingham Forest	2021–22	Championship	0	0	0	0	—		—		0	0
Nottingham Forest B	2021–22	Premier League 2	2	0	—		—		—		2	0
Luzern (loan)	2021–22	Swiss Super League	19	3	2	1	—		—		21	4
Luzern (loan)	2022–23	Swiss Super League	31	3	2	0	—		—		33	3
Luzern (loan)	Total		50	6	4	1	—		—		54	7
Basel	2023–24	Swiss Super League	20	2	3	0	—		—		23	2
Basel	2024–25	Swiss Super League	1	0	0	0	—		—		1	0
Basel	Total		21	2	3	0	—		—		24	2
Eintracht Braunschweig	2024–25	2. Bundesliga	5	0	—		—		—		5	0
Eintracht Braunschweig	2025–26	2. Bundesliga	0	0	0	0	—		—		0	0
Eintracht Braunschweig	Total		5	0	0	0	—		—		5	2
Eintracht Braunschweig II	2025–26	Oberliga Niedersachsen	11	0	—		—		—		11	0
Espérance de Tunis	2025–26	Tunisian Ligue Professionnelle 1	6	0	0	0	4 (Note: Appearances in CAF Champions League)	0	—		10	0
Espérance de Tunis	2026–27	Tunisian Ligue Professionnelle 1	6	0	0	0	2	0	0	0	8	0
Espérance de Tunis	Total		12	0	0	0	6	0	0	0	18	0
Career total			301	43	18	1	8	0	0	0	327	44

=== International ===
As of matches played on 17 October 2023

Appearances and goals by national team and year
National team	Year	Apps	Goals
Tunisia	2018	1	0
Tunisia	2019	12	0
Tunisia	2020	3	1
Tunisia	2021	8	2
Tunisia	2022	12	0
Tunisia	2023	3	0
Total		39	3

Scores and results list Tunisia's goal tally first, score column indicates score after each Dräger goal.

List of international goals scored by Mohamed Dräger
No.	Date	Venue	Opponent	Score	Result	Competition
1	13 October 2020	Jacques Lemans Arena, Sankt Veit an der Glan, Austria	Nigeria	1–1	1–1	Friendly
2	25 March 2021	Benina Martyrs Stadium, Benghazi, Libya	Libya	3–1	5–2	2021 Africa Cup of Nations qualification
3	16 November 2021	Hammadi Agrebi Stadium, Tunis, Tunisia	Zambia	2–0	3–1	2022 FIFA World Cup qualification

== Honours ==
Olympiacos

- Super League Greece: 2020–21

Basel

- Swiss Super League: 2024–25

Espérance de Tunis

- Tunisian Cup: 2025–26

Tunisia

- FIFA Arab Cup runner-up: 2021
- Africa Cup of Nations fourth place: 2019
