= Ardon Jashari =

Swiss footballer (born 2002)

Personal information
- Full name: Ardon Jashari
- Date of birth: 30 July 2002 (age 24)
- Place of birth: Cham, Switzerland
- Height: 1.81 m (5 ft 11 in)
- Position: Central midfielder

Team information
- Current team: AC Milan
- Number: 30

Youth career
- 2013–2020: Luzern

Senior career*
| Years | Team | Apps | (Gls) |
| 2019–2021 | Luzern II | 25 | (6) |
| 2020–2024 | Luzern | 91 | (8) |
| 2024–2025 | Club Brugge | 35 | (3) |
| 2025– | AC Milan | 24 | (1) |

International career^{‡}
| 2022–2024 | Switzerland U21 | 11 | (0) |
| 2022– | Switzerland | 16 | (0) |
- * Club domestic league appearances and goals as of 22:29, 22 November 2026 (UTC) ‡ National team caps and goals as of 16 November 2026

Ardon Jashari (born 30 July 2002) is a Swiss professional footballer who plays as a central midfielder for Serie A club AC Milan and the Switzerland national team.

== Club career ==
=== Luzern ===
Jashari made his professional debut with Luzern in a 2–1 Swiss Super League victory against Zürich on 31 July 2020.

=== Club Brugge ===
In April 2024, it was announced that Jashari would join Belgian Pro League club Club Brugge in the summer, having agreed a four-year contract. The transfer fee was reported as €6 million, a club record for FC Luzern.

Jashari had a strong first season in midfield for Club Brugge as they won the Belgian Cup, finished second in the Belgian Pro League behind Union Saint-Gilloise, and qualified for the knockout stages of the 2024–25 UEFA Champions League, losing to Aston Villa in the first knockout round.

Jashari was rewarded for his efforts by being voted both Player of the Year and Young Player of the Year at the Pro League Awards.

=== AC Milan ===
On 6 August 2025, Jashari joined Serie A club AC Milan on a five-year deal.

== International career ==
On 27 September 2022, Jashari debuted for the Switzerland national team in a Nations League match against the Czech Republic, replacing Remo Freuler in extra-time.

In November 2022, Jashari was announced as part of the Switzerland squad for the 2022 FIFA World Cup.

In May 2026, Jashari made the Switzerland squad for the 2026 FIFA World Cup.

== Personal life ==
Born in Cham, Switzerland, Jashari is of ethnic Albanian descent from Kumanovo, North Macedonia.

== Career statistics ==
=== Club ===
As of match played 22 November 2026

Appearances and goals by club, season and competition
| Club | Season | League | | | National cup (Note: Includes Swiss Cup, Belgian Cup, Coppa Italia) | | Europe | | Other | | Total | |
| Club | Season | Division | Apps | Goals | Apps | Goals | Apps | Goals | Apps | Goals | Apps | Goals |
|---|---|---|---|---|---|---|---|---|---|---|---|---|
| Luzern II | 2019–20 | Swiss 1. Liga | 2 | 0 | — | | — | | — | | 2 | 0 |
| Luzern II | 2020–21 | Swiss 1. Liga | 10 | 3 | — | | — | | — | | 10 | 3 |
| Luzern II | 2021–22 | Swiss 1. Liga | 13 | 3 | — | | — | | — | | 13 | 3 |
| Luzern II | Total | | 25 | 6 | — | | — | | — | | 25 | 6 |
| Luzern | 2019–20 | Swiss Super League | 2 | 0 | 0 | 0 | — | | — | | 2 | 0 |
| Luzern | 2020–21 | Swiss Super League | 0 | 0 | 0 | 0 | — | | — | | 0 | 0 |
| Luzern | 2021–22 | Swiss Super League | 19 | 2 | 2 | 0 | — | | — | | 21 | 2 |
| Luzern | 2022–23 | Swiss Super League | 34 | 1 | 3 | 0 | — | | — | | 37 | 1 |
| Luzern | 2023–24 | Swiss Super League | 36 | 5 | 3 | 1 | 3 (Note: Appearances in UEFA Europa Conference League) | 0 | — | | 42 | 6 |
| Luzern | Total | | 91 | 8 | 8 | 1 | 3 | 0 | — | | 102 | 9 |
| Club Brugge | 2024–25 | Belgian Pro League | 35 | 3 | 6 | 1 | 11 (Note: Appearances in UEFA Champions League) | 0 | 0 | 0 | 52 | 4 |
| AC Milan | 2025–26 | Serie A | 14 | 0 | 2 | 0 | — | | 1 (Note: Appearance in Supercoppa Italiana) | 0 | 17 | 0 |
| AC Milan | 2026–27 | Serie A | 10 | 1 | 0 | 0 | 4 (Note: Appearances in UEFA Europa League) | 0 | — | | 14 | 1 |
| AC Milan | Total | | 24 | 1 | 2 | 0 | 4 | 0 | 1 | 0 | 31 | 1 |
| Career total | | | 175 | 18 | 16 | 2 | 18 | 0 | 1 | 0 | 210 | 20 |

=== International ===
As of match played 16 November 2026

Appearances and goals by national team and year
| National team | Year | Apps | Goals |
|---|---|---|---|
| Switzerland | 2022 | 2 | 0 |
| Switzerland | 2023 | 0 | 0 |
| Switzerland | 2024 | 0 | 0 |
| Switzerland | 2025 | 2 | 0 |
| Switzerland | 2026 | 12 | 0 |
| Total | | 16 | 0 |

== Honours ==
Club Brugge

- Belgian Cup: 2024–25

Individual

- Swiss Super League Player of the Month: September 2022
- Belgian Young Player of the Year: 2025
- Belgian Pro League Player of the Year: 2025
- Belgian Golden Shoe: 2025
