= Asumah Abubakar =

Portuguese footballer

Personal information
- Full name: Asumah Abubakar-Ankrah
- Date of birth: 10 May 1997 (age 29)
- Place of birth: Kumasi, Ghana
- Height: 1.83 m (6 ft 0 in)
- Position: Forward

Team information
- Current team: Austria Lustenau
- Number: 35

Youth career
- Corners Babies
- 2015–2016: Willem II

Senior career*
| Years | Team | Apps | (Gls) |
| 2016–2018 | Willem II | 16 | (0) |
| 2018–2019 | MVV Maastricht | 27 | (0) |
| 2019–2021 | Kriens | 47 | (22) |
| 2021–2022 | Lugano | 37 | (5) |
| 2022–2024 | Luzern | 53 | (9) |
| 2024–2025 | Grasshoppers | 25 | (2) |
| 2025 | Brisbane Roar | 11 | (4) |
| 2025–2026 | Birkirkara | 5 | (4) |
| 2026- | Austria Lustenau | 8 | (0) |

International career
| 2016 | Portugal U19 | 2 | (1) |
- * Club domestic league appearances and goals as of 17 May 2026

Asumah Abubakar-Ankrah (born 10 May 1997) is a footballer who plays as a forward for Austrian club Austria Lustenau. Born in Ghana, he is a youth international for Portugal.

== Club career ==
Born in Kumasi, Ghana, Abubakar had a successful trial with Willem II in the summer of 2015, but he had to wait to the following year to sign a contract due to work permit problems. He eventually received a Portuguese passport as his father had been working in the nation for several years, and on 2 March 2016 he committed to the Dutch club on a short-term deal.

On 2 April 2016, whilst still a junior, Abubakar made his senior debut, coming on as a late substitute in a 2–3 Eredivisie home loss against FC Twente. He transferred to MVV Maastricht for the 2018-2019 season on a free transfer. After 27 appearances and another goalless season Abubakar transferred to Swiss club SC Kriens. On 28 July 2019, he would score his first professional goal against FC Aarau after being subbed on in the 71st minute. He ended the season third in the top scorer rankings. In his second season, despite Kriens finishing mid-table, he again finished third in the scoring charts and won the Switzerland Challenge League Best Player Award. Abubakar transferred to Swiss Super League club FC Lugano at the start of the 2021-2022 season for 100,000 Euros. He scored his first goal for Lugano on his third appearance in a 1–1 draw with FC Basel.

On 14 January 2022, Abubakar signed a contract with Luzern until 30 June 2024.

On 29 January 2024, he transferred to Grasshoppers for an undisclosed fee. He signed a one-and-a-half-year contract, running until summer 2025, and rejoins his former coach Bruno Berner, whom he had worked with at Kriens. He debuted two days later in a midweek league match against his former club FC Lugano, coming on for the final 30 minutes of the 0–0 draw. After bringing some much needed offensive power in his debut, he was nominated to the starting lineup for the next two games. However, in the second, a Zürich Derby match, he was sent off after pushing over FC Zürich midfielder Bledian Krasniqi during a confrontation after only twelve minutes played. This was his first career sending off. He finally scored his first goal in the Grasshopper dress on 4 May 2024, scoring the team's first goal in 3–2 home win over FC Stade Lausanne Ouchy. In the same game he also scored two disallowed goals from offside positions. On 31 May 2024, he scored the all-important winning goal in the 91st minute in the second leg of the relegation play-off against FC Thun, thus securing Grasshoppers's place in the Swiss Super League

Despite this heroic feat, he barely featured for the club in his second season, making just seven appearances and one start during the first half of the season. On 7 January 2025, his contract with Grasshoppers was terminated by mutual consent.

On 12 February 2025, he signed for Brisbane Roar in the Australian A-League. On 25 June 2025, Brisbane Roar announced that Abubakar would be departing the club after rejecting a new contract.

In October 2025, Abubakar joined Maltanese Premier League Club Birkirkara FC

== International career ==
Having acquired Portuguese citizenship, Abubakar chose to represent that country. On 16 June 2016, he was selected for a 23-man preliminary list for the 2016 UEFA European Under-19 Championship and also made the final squad, scoring in a 4–3 group stage win over the hosts Germany. Shortly after, however, after doubts arose regarding his eligibility, the Portuguese Football Federation opted to immediately remove him from the competition pending further approval.

== Career statistics ==
=== Club ===
As of 7 January 2025

Appearances and goals by club, season and competition
| Club | Season | League | | | Cup | | Continental | | Other | | Total | |
| Club | Season | Division | Apps | Goals | Apps | Goals | Apps | Goals | Apps | Goals | Apps | Goals |
|---|---|---|---|---|---|---|---|---|---|---|---|---|
| Willem II | 2015–16 | Eredivisie | 1 | 0 | 0 | 0 | — | | — | | 1 | 0 |
| Willem II | 2016–17 | Eredivisie | 15 | 0 | 1 | 0 | — | | — | | 16 | 0 |
| Willem II | 2017–18 | Eredivisie | 0 | 0 | 0 | 0 | — | | — | | 0 | 0 |
| Willem II | Total | | 16 | 0 | 1 | 0 | 0 | 0 | 0 | 0 | 17 | 0 |
| MVV | 2018–19 | Eerste Divisie | 27 | 0 | 1 | 0 | — | | — | | 28 | 0 |
| Kriens | 2019–20 | Challenge League | 36 | 15 | 1 | 0 | — | | — | | 37 | 15 |
| Kriens | 2020–21 | Challenge League | 11 | 7 | 1 | 0 | — | | — | | 12 | 7 |
| Kriens | Total | | 47 | 22 | 2 | 0 | 0 | 0 | 0 | 0 | 49 | 22 |
| Lugano | 2020–21 | Super League | 20 | 2 | 2 | 0 | — | | — | | 22 | 2 |
| Lugano | 2021–22 | Super League | 16 | 3 | 2 | 1 | — | | — | | 18 | 4 |
| Lugano | Total | | 36 | 5 | 4 | 1 | 0 | 0 | 0 | 0 | 40 | 6 |
| Luzern | 2021–22 | Super League | 18 | 5 | 2 | 1 | — | | 2 (Note: Matches in the relegation play-off.) | 0 | 22 | 6 |
| Luzern | 2022–23 | Super League | 28 | 3 | 3 | 0 | — | | — | | 31 | 3 |
| Luzern | 2023–24 | Super League | 7 | 1 | 1 | 0 | 1 (Note: Matches in 2023–24 UEFA Europa Conference League qualifying.) | 0 | — | | 9 | 1 |
| Luzern | Total | | 53 | 8 | 6 | 1 | 1 | 0 | 2 | 0 | 62 | 10 |
| Grasshopper | 2023–24 | Super League | 16 | 1 | — | | — | | 2 (Note: Matches in the relegation play-off.) | 1 | 18 | 2 |
| Grasshopper | 2024–25 | Super League | 7 | 0 | 0 | 0 | — | | — | | 7 | 0 |
| Grasshopper | Total | | 23 | 1 | 0 | 0 | 0 | 0 | 2 | 1 | 25 | 2 |
| Career total | | | 202 | 37 | 14 | 2 | 1 | 0 | 4 | 1 | 214 | 41 |
