= Max Meyer (footballer) =

German footballer (born 1995)

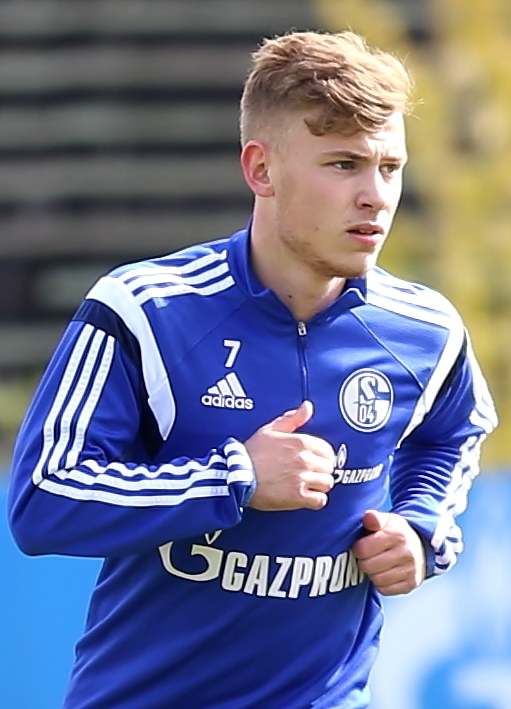
- Meyer with Schalke 04 in 2015

Personal information
- Full name: Maximilian Meyer
- Date of birth: 18 September 1995 (age 31)
- Place of birth: Oberhausen, Germany
- Height: 1.73 m (5 ft 8 in)
- Position: Attacking midfielder

Team information
- Current team: Rot-Weiß Oberhausen
- Number: 16

Youth career
- 2000–2002: FC Sardegna Oberhausen
- 2002–2004: Rot-Weiß Oberhausen
- 2004–2009: MSV Duisburg
- 2009–2012: Schalke 04

Senior career*
Years	Team	Apps	(Gls)
2013–2018	Schalke 04	146	(17)
2013	Schalke 04 II	1	(2)
2018–2021	Crystal Palace	46	(1)
2021	1. FC Köln	10	(0)
2021–2022	Fenerbahçe	6	(0)
2022	→ Midtjylland (loan)	8	(0)
2022–2024	Luzern	65	(17)
2024–2026	APOEL	42	(2)
2026–	Rot-Weiß Oberhausen	0	(0)

International career
2009	Germany U15	1	(1)
2010–2011	Germany U16	6	(2)
2011–2012	Germany U17	18	(9)
2013–2015	Germany U19	3	(1)
2014–2017	Germany U21	24	(7)
2016	Germany Olympic	6	(4)
2014–2016	Germany	4	(1)
Medal record
Olympic Games
Silver medal – second place	2016 Rio de Janeiro	Team
UEFA U17 Championship
Runner-up	2012 Hungary
U21
Winner	2017 Poland
- * Club domestic league appearances and goals as of 14 September 2026

Maximilian Meyer (German pronunciation: [maks(iˈmiːli̯aːn) ˈmaɪɐ]; born 18 September 1995) is a German professional footballer who plays as an attacking midfielder for Regionalliga West club Rot-Weiß Oberhausen.

Meyer began his career in 2000, playing for local youth clubs in his hometown of Oberhausen. He then played within MSV Duisburg's youth system for five years, before moving to Schalke 04 in 2009. Following success at U-19 level, Meyer was promoted to the senior side, making his debut in 2013. Initially playing as an attacking midfielder, his position was made more defensive in the 2017–18 season, but a dispute with the Schalke hierarchy the following April saw him fall out of favour and subsequently run down his contract, becoming a free agent that summer.

Internationally, he represented Germany at various youth levels, playing for U15, U16, U17, U19 and U21 teams. He made his senior debut in 2014, and later captained the Olympic team at the 2016 Summer Olympics, where they finished as runners-up to Brazil.

== Early career ==
Meyer began playing football at local club FC Sardegna Oberhausen before being scouted and signed by Rot-Weiß Oberhausen at the age of seven. He spent two years in the club's academy before joining MSV Duisburg in 2004 where he remained for five years. In 2009, he transferred to Schalke 04 where he was integrated into the club's youth teams. He progressed through the ranks and was part of the U19 side which won the 2011–12 German U-19 Championship, featuring in a 2–1 win over Bayern Munich. Meyer's form at U-19 level, which saw him score 11 goals and create 11 assists in 15 appearances for the season, earned the attention of general manager Horst Heldt who signed him to his first professional contract.

== Club career ==
=== Schalke 04 ===
Following the departure of fellow midfielder Lewis Holtby to Tottenham Hotspur and the injuries of several other players, Meyer was included in Schalke's Bundesliga and UEFA Champions League squads for the 2012–13 season. He made his debut for the club on 16 February 2013, coming on as a substitute for Raffael and assisting Michel Bastos for a late goal in a 2–2 draw with Mainz 05. His Champions League debut followed on 12 March when he appeared in a match against Turkish side Galatasaray. Still aged 17, Meyer left school, the Gesamtschule Berger Feld, later that year before finishing his school-leaving examinations in order to focus on his football.

Ahead of the 2013–14 season, Meyer was issued shirt number 7 previously worn by Raúl. He started the season by scoring a brace against SSVg Velbert while playing for Schalke's reserve side, Schalke 04 II. He then featured for the first team later that month in a 4–0 league win over VfL Wolfsburg, where he came on as a 73rd minute substitute for Jefferson Farfán. On 21 August, he made his first start for the club in a Champions League play-off match against PAOK. In the return fixture, he came on as a second-half substitute and set up Julian Draxler to give Schalke the lead. He was then substituted off after just eight minutes as the club looked to hold on to the win, with German media later labelling his assist as a "€20m pass" as it helped Schalke qualify for the Champions League proper. On 25 September, Meyer scored his first goal for Schalke in a DFB-Pokal match against Darmstadt 98. He scored goals in three consecutive matches against and Augsburg and Borussia Dortmund. Following his impressive performance against Chelsea in the Champions League, he became a transfer target for the West London club, who were willing to pay Schalke €15 million. On 30 November, Meyer signed a contract extension with Schalke until 30 June 2018. On 26 January 2014, he scored in the first match after the winter break against Hamburger SV.

In the 2014–15 season, Meyer scored goals against Werder Bremen (home and away), Stuttgart and 1899 Hoffenheim. His most significant contribution was in a Champions League group stage match against Maribor, where he scored the only goal to take Schalke through to the round of 16, but they ultimately came up short against Real Madrid, losing 5–4 over two legs.

In the 2015–16 season, Meyer scored goals against Hertha Berlin, Bayern Munich, Darmstadt 98, Hamburger SV and Köln. He also scored in the final Europa League group match, the final goal in a comfortable 4–0 win over Asteras Tripolis. The following season, Meyer only scored two goals in all competitions: once in a league win over against Mainz 05, and the other in a Europa League win over PAOK.

In the 2017–18 season, under the tutelage of new manager Domenico Tedesco, Meyer played as a defensive midfielder. According to Sky Germany reporter Dirk Grosse Schlarmann, the positional change better suited his qualities with an improvement in form, and because the crowd did not expect to him to win the match, he had more time to look and think about the opening pass when Schalke went on the attack. However, in April, Meyer publicly criticised sporting director Christian Heidel and was left out of training for the rest of the season, which allowed him to run down the remainder of his contract until its expiration in June.

=== Crystal Palace ===
On 2 August 2018, Meyer signed a three-year contract with Crystal Palace. After playing regularly in his first season he began struggling for first team appearances in his second, culminating in being dropped to the U23s in December 2020 after failing to play a single minute of League football in the first half of the Eagles' 2020–21 season. On 15 January 2021, Crystal Palace announced that Meyer had left the club via mutual consent.

=== 1. FC Köln ===
On 25 January 2021, it was reported that Bundesliga side 1. FC Köln had signed Meyer on a free transfer on a short-term deal until the end of the 2020–21 season.

=== Fenerbahçe ===
On 2 September 2021, Meyer signed a 2-year deal with Turkish side Fenerbahçe. He made his debut in a 1–1 Süper Lig draw against Sivasspor on 12 September 2021. On 4 November 2021, he scored his first goal for the club in a 3–0 UEFA Europa League victory against Royal Antwerp.

On 31 January 2022, Meyer was loaned to Danish side Midtjylland on a half-year deal, with an option to buy. However, after an underwhelming season with only 13 appearances and zero goals, he returned to Fenerbahçe at the end of the season.

=== FC Luzern ===
Meyer moved to Swiss Super League club FC Luzern in August 2022. He signed a one-year contract, extended for a further season from June 2023.

=== APOEL FC ===
Meyer moved to Cypriot club APOEL as a free agent in the summer of 2024.

=== Rot-Weiß Oberhausen ===
In September 2026, Meyer joined Rot-Weiß Oberhausen as a free agent.

== International career ==
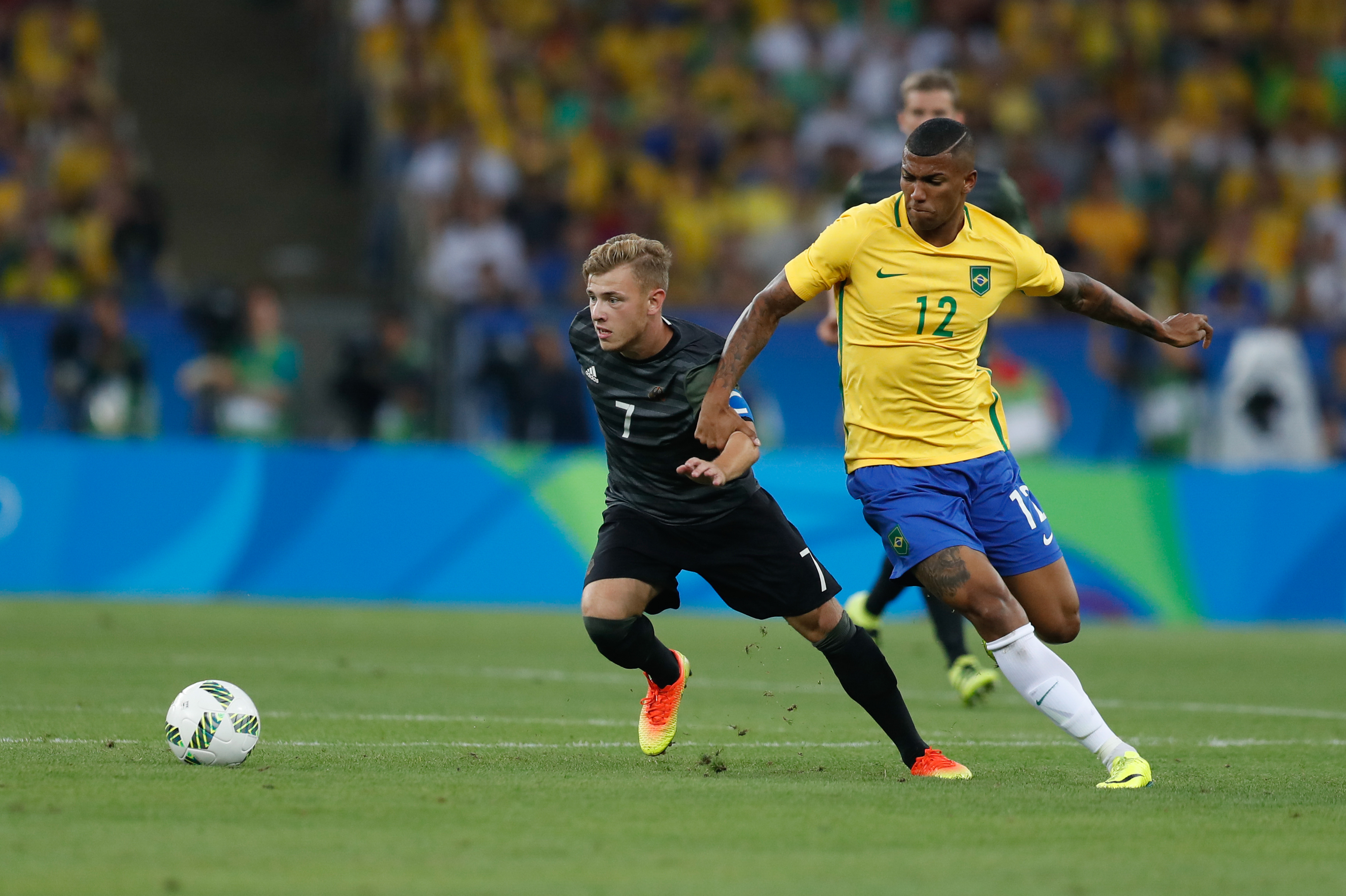
Meyer (left) on the ball against Walace (right) in the gold medal final at the 2016 Summer Olympics against Brazil

=== Youth ===
Meyer was part of the Germany U17 squad for 2012 UEFA European Under-17 Championship. He scored three goals to help Germany to reach the final, which the Germans lost in a penalty shoot-out to the Netherlands U17. Nevertheless, Meyer was top scorer and awarded best player of the tournament. Meyer won the Fritz Walter U17 Silver Medal in 2012. Meyer scored his first goal for Germany's U19 team in a friendly against the Netherlands U19.

=== Senior ===
Meyer was included in the Germany senior team's 30-man provisional squad for 2014 FIFA World Cup. On 13 May 2014, he made his senior debut against Poland. Though Meyer started the match, in the 76th minute he was substituted out for Maximilian Arnold. On 31 October 2016, Meyer scored his first goal for Germany in a 2–0 friendly win against Finland in Mönchengladbach.

=== Olympic team ===
Alongside Schalke teammate Leon Goretzka, Meyer was named in the squad for the 2016 Summer Olympics. Meyer would captain the team for the rest of the tournament after Goretzka suffered a shoulder injury. On 11 August 2016, Meyer scored a hat-trick in a 10–0 win over the Fiji U23 national team, although he also missed a penalty. In the gold medal final, played on 21 August, Meyer scored the equaliser that extended the decision to penalty shootout, which Germany lost to Brazil U23 in a 5–4 penalty score.

== Style of play ==
Because of his dribbling abilities and his high speed, his playing style is compared to that of Argentine football legend Lionel Messi. When asked about his good technique, Meyer replied, "At the age of 10 I dabbled in futsal for four years besides the football club. In addition to the three workouts at the club I had one complementary futsal session per week. Saturday noon was the time for the football game and in the afternoon the futsal game took place."

== Personal life ==
Meyer describes his diet as "80% vegan".

== Career statistics ==
=== Club ===
As of match played 22 April 2026

Appearances and goals by club, season and competition
Club	Season	League			National cup (Note: Includes DFB-Pokal, FA Cup, Turkish Cup, Danish Cup, Swiss Cup)		League cup (Note: Includes EFL Cup)		Europe		Other		Total	
Club	Season	Division	Apps	Goals	Apps	Goals	Apps	Goals	Apps	Goals	Apps	Goals	Apps	Goals
Schalke 04	2012–13	Bundesliga	5	0	0	0	—		1	0	—		6	0
Schalke 04	2013–14	Bundesliga	30	6	2	1	—		9 (Note: Appearances in UEFA Champions League)	0	—		41	7
Schalke 04	2014–15	Bundesliga	28	5	1	0	—		8	1	—		37	6
Schalke 04	2015–16	Bundesliga	32	5	2	0	—		7 (Note: Appearances in UEFA Europa League)	1	—		41	6
Schalke 04	2016–17	Bundesliga	27	1	3	0	—		9	1	—		39	2
Schalke 04	2017–18	Bundesliga	24	0	4	1	—		—		—		28	1
Schalke 04	Total		146	17	12	2	—		34	3	—		192	22
Schalke 04 II	2013–14	Regionalliga West	1	2	—		—		—		—		1	2
Crystal Palace	2018–19	Premier League	29	1	4	1	3	0	—		—		36	2
Crystal Palace	2019–20	Premier League	17	0	1	0	1	0	—		—		19	0
Crystal Palace	2020–21	Premier League	0	0	0	0	1	0	—		—		1	0
Crystal Palace	Total		46	1	5	1	5	0	—		—		56	2
1. FC Köln	2020–21	Bundesliga	10	0	1	0	—		—		1 (Note: Appearance in Bundesliga relegation play-offs)	0	12	0
Fenerbahçe	2021–22	Süper Lig	6	0	1	0	—		5	1	—		12	1
Midtjylland (loan)	2021–22	Danish Superliga	8	0	3	0	—		2 (Note: Appearances in UEFA Europa Conference League)	0	—		13	0
FC Luzern	2022–23	Swiss Super League	29	11	2	1	—		—		—		31	12
FC Luzern	2023–24	Swiss Super League	36	6	3	2	—		4	0	—		43	8
FC Luzern	Total		65	17	5	3	—		4	0	—		74	20
APOEL	2024–25	Cypriot First Division	22	2	1	0	—		9 (Note: Four appearances in UEFA Champions League, two appearances in UEFA Europa League, three appearances in UEFA Europa Conference League)	0	—		32	2
APOEL	2025–26	Cypriot First Division	20	0	1	0	—		—		—		21	0
APOEL	Total		42	2	2	0	—		9	0	—		53	2
Rot-Weiß Oberhausen	2026–27	Regionalliga West	0	0	—		—		—		—		0	0
Career total			324	39	29	6	5	0	54	4	1	0	413	49

=== International ===
As of match played 11 November 2016

Appearances and goals by national team and year
National team	Year	App	Goals
Germany	2014	1	0
Germany	2016	3	1
Total		4	1

As of match played 11 November 2016. Germany score listed first, score column indicates score after each Meyer goal.

List of international goals scored by Max Meyer
No.	Date	Venue	Opponent	Score	Result	Competition
1	31 August 2016	Borussia-Park, Mönchengladbach, Germany	Finland	1–0	2–0	Friendly

== Honours ==
=== Club ===
FC Midtjylland

- Danish Cup: 2021–22

=== International ===
Germany U17

- UEFA European Under-17 Championship runner-up: 2012

Germany U21

- UEFA European Under-21 Championship: 2017

Germany U23

- Olympic Silver Medal: 2016

=== Individual ===
- UEFA European Under-17 Championship Golden Player: 2012
- UEFA European Under-17 Championship Team of the Tournament: 2012
- Fritz Walter Medal U17 Silver: 2012
- Fritz Walter Medal U19 Silver: 2014
- UEFA European Under-21 Championship Team of the Tournament: 2017
- Swiss Super League Player of the Month: October 2022
- Swiss Super League Team of the Year: 2022-23
