= Pascal Schürpf =

Swiss footballer (born 1989)

Personal information
- Date of birth: 15 July 1989 (age 37)
- Place of birth: Basel, Switzerland
- Height: 1.88 m (6 ft 2 in)
- Positions: Midfielder; striker

Youth career
- –1999: BSC Old Boys
- 1999–2007: FC Basel

Senior career*
Years	Team	Apps	(Gls)
2007–2012	FC Basel U-21	59	(42)
2009	→ Concordia (loan)	14	(5)
2009–2013	Basel	14	(1)
2011	→ Lugano (loan)	16	(2)
2011–2012	→ Aarau (loan)	10	(0)
2013	→ Bellinzona (loan)	15	(6)
2013–2014	→ Vaduz (loan)	36	(10)
2014–2017	Vaduz	49	(7)
2017–2023	Luzern	163	(44)
2023–2025	Grasshopper Club Zürich	59	(7)
Total		435	(124)

International career^{‡}
2006	Switzerland U-18	1	(0)
2007	Switzerland U-19	3	(2)
2008–2010	Switzerland U-20	5	(2)
2010–2011	Switzerland U-21	5	(1)
- * Club domestic league appearances and goals as of 1 July 2025 ‡ National team caps and goals as of 1 January 2012, 24:00 (UTC)

Pascal Schürpf (born 15 July 1989) is a former Swiss professional footballer who plays as a midfielder or striker, most recently for Grasshopper Club Zürich in the Swiss Super League. He was also Swiss youth international footballer.

== Career ==
=== Youth career ===
Born in Basel, Schürpf started his football in the youth system at local amateur club BSC Old Boys, before joining the youth system of FC Basel in 1999, progressing regularly through the ranks. He played in their U-18 team during the 2005–06 season, under coach Patrick Rahmen and his assistant Marco Walker and with them won both the Swiss U-18 championship and the U-19/18 national cup that season. Another season later Schürpf advanced to Basel's U-21 team, who played in the 1. Liga at that time the third highest tier in the Swiss football league system. Here in his first season, again under coach Patrick Rahmen, Schürpf scored 17 goals for them in 26 appearances, the team ending the season as division champions, but not being eligible for promotion. On 29 May 2008, he signed his first professional contract with the club, a three-year contract running until 30 June 2011. In the 2008–09 season Schürpf was well under way, scoring 15 times in 16 outings during the first half of their season.

==== Loan to Concordia ====
At that time, Basel's city neighbours and partner team Concordia Basel played in the 2008–09 Swiss Challenge League. For the second half of the season Schürpf was loaned out to them and here he played his professional debut. Schürpf played fourteen games and scored five goals in his time with the club and the team ended the season in eighth position. However, Concordia were refused a professional license for the 2009–10 season and, due to financial reasons, were administratively relegated to the fourth tier. Therefore, Schürpf returned to his club of origin.

=== Basel ===
Returning to Basel, he joined Basel's first team in advance of their 2009–10 season under head coach Thorsten Fink. Despite training with them, Schürpf could not break into the team, so after October gained playing practice with the U-21 team. Then on 12 December, he played his debut for the club in the Swiss Cup quarter-final home match in the St. Jakob-Park as Basel won 3–1 against Biel-Bienne. Just four days later, on 16 December, he played his debit in a European competition. In the 2009–10 UEFA Europa League the final match of the group stage was a home game against Fulham and Schürpf came on as substitute in the 79th minute. After playing in nine further test games during the winter break, Schürpf played his domestic league debut for the team on 14 February 2010 as substitute in the 3–1 away win against Neuchâtel Xamax. Schürpf won the national Double with Basel at the end of the season.

During the early days of their following 2010–11 season Schürpf played his first domestic league match over the full 90 minutes and in this game he scored his first league goal for the team. On 21 August 2010 in the away game against FC Thun, he scored the first goal of the match, but the home team pulled it back and it ended with a 1–1 draw. Four weeks later, on 19 September Basel played a match in the first round of the 2010–11 Swiss Cup away against third tier Mendrisio-Stabio. Schürpf was in the starting eleven and scored a brace. In the 37th and 70th minute he netted the team's second and third goal as Basel went on to win 5–0 and qualify for the next round.

However, during the first half of the season Schürpf played only five times in the league and twice in the cup for the first team. Over this same period, he had eight appearances for the U-21, scoring six times. Basel renewed Schürpf's contract, extending it until June 2014, then on 9 January 2011 the club announced that they had loaned Schürpf out to FC Lugano in the Challenge League until the end of the season.

==== Loan to Lugano ====
Schüpf joined FC Lugano under head coach Marco Schällibaum for the second half of the 2010–11 Challenge League season. He made his debut in the Lugano colours in the 2–1 home win against Vaduz on 21 February 2011. His first goal for Lugano was the winning goal in the 3–2 away win against Biel-Bienne just one week later. Lugano had a good run, winning ten games straight off, rising to the top of the table. However, things turned in the opposite direction and they were defeated five times in a row. Lugano missed promotion, three points behind division winners Lausanne-Sport and level on points with Servette, who won the promotion play-off. In his short period with them, Schüpf played 16 of their 17 matches, of which 14 appearances were in the starting formation.

==== Loan to Aarau ====
For their 2011–12 season Schüpf was recalled to Basel. In July 2011 he played with Basel in the Uhrencup and won the tournament. But during the first half of the season he only played in three league matches and had two appearances in the 2011–12 Swiss Cup. Therefore, he was loaned out again, so that he could gain playing experience. This time to Aarau, again in the Challenge League. In Aarau his contract was due to be over one and a half years. In his first six months he had five appearances in the starting formation, five as substitute and five matches where he remained on the bench. The loan was cancelled in August 2012 and he returned to Basel to play for the reserve team in the 1. Liga Promotion, the third highest tier of Swiss football, where he scored 10 times in 17 appearances.

==== Loan to Bellinzona ====
On 31 January 2013, it was announced that Schürpf was loaned out to AC Bellinzona, again with the statement, so that he could gain playing experience in a higher league. During his half-year loan Schürpf had 15 appearances, 11 of which in the starting eleven, scoring six goals. In the match on 18 April he scored a hat-trick as Bellinzona went on to win 8–0 against Wil.

==== Loan to Vaduz ====
After his loan period in Bellinzona, Schürpf returned to his club of origin. However, during July 2013 Basel announced that they were loaning out Schürpf for the season to FC Vaduz, who played in the Challenge League. At the end of the season Vaduz became division champions and won promotion. Schürpf played all 36 league games and scored 10 goals. He also played both games in the qualification to the 2013–14 UEFA Europa League, but Vaduz were eliminated by Chikhura Sachkhere on the away goals rule. He played two games in the 2013–14 Liechtenstein Cup and scored the first goal in the final as Vaduz went on to win 6–0 against USV Eschen/Mauren.

=== Vaduz ===
At the end of the loan period Basel did not extend their contract with Schürpf and so he signed for Vaduz on a permanent basis, with a contract up until summer 2016. Schurpf quickly adapted to the higher league style of play and during the 2014–15 Swiss Super League season he played 34 games scoring 7 goals. The team ended the season one point clear of the relegation slot. In the qualification to the 2013–14 UEFA Europa League, Schurf scored a brace as Vaduz won 3–0 against College Europa. The Vaduz first team advanced to the final of the 2014–15 Liechtenstein Cup and Schurpf was able to score as they won 5–0 against FC Triesenberg.

In the first qualification round to the 2014–15 UEFA Europa League, Schurf scored one goal in each of both legs as Vaduz qualified themselves for the next round, winning 10–1 on aggregate against La Fiorita from San Marino. However, just a few days later he injured himself, suffering cartilage damage and he missed the entire 2015–16 league season due to his injury. He recovered just enough to receive a 45 minute appearance as substitute in the 2015–16 Liechtenstein Cup final. He scored one goal in this final as well, as the team went on to win 11–0 against FC Schaan.

To the beginning of the 2016–17 Super League season, Schurf, still hampered by his injury, was used mainly as substitute. It was not until December before he fought his way back into the starting eleven, but by then the team had slipped to last position in the table.

=== Luzern ===
At the end of the Swiss winter transfer phase, on 28 February 2017, Schürpf moved from Vaduz and joined Luzern under head coach Markus Babbel, signing a two-and-a-half-year contract. He played his debut for his new club on 5 March 2017 in the Swissporarena against Grasshopper Club. He was substituted in during the 64th minute and scored the equaliser with a header just eight minutes later and the game ended with a 1–1 draw. In the match on 14 May, Schürpf suffered a broken nose and therefore played the rest of the season with a face mask.

2017–18

Luzern started reasonably well into their 2017–18 league season climbing to fourth position in the table by mid-September, but a string of five defeats in six matches let them slip into the relegation zone and to the bottom position at the end of November. The team under coach Babbel was in danger of relegation. During the winter break, the German coach sidelined himself with a fateful statement, which was enough for the FCL club officials, and they released Babbel immediately and replaced him through their U-21 team coach Gerardo Seoane. Following Seoane's appointment, the team remained undefeated eight games in a row, climbed from 9th to 3rd place and achieved qualification for the Europa League third qualifying round. Schürpf was the man of the hour, as scored 10 of his 11 goals during this period, including a brace against Thun the end of February, a further brace against Lugano in March and another brace against St. Gallen in May.

2018–19

René Weiler was appointed as FCL head coach for the 2018–19 league season. The team played somewhat erratically, but Schürpf always played in the starting eleven. During the time that team captain Christian Schneuwly was injured, Schürpf wore the captain armband. Up until the winter break Schürpf had netted six times and the team were in fifth position in the table. After the winter break the team suffered three defeats in a row, slipping in the league table and Weiler was replaced by Thomas Häberli. The team caught themselves again and ended the season in fifth position, achieving qualification for the 2019–20 Europa League second qualifying round. Schürpf had 34 league appearances, 32 of which in the starting eleven, and scored nine goals. In the 2018–19 Swiss Cup quarter-final he scored a brace as Luzern won 4–0 against Young Boys. But the team were knocked-out in the semi-finals.

2019–20

Häberli appointed Schürpf as captain, but at the beginning of the 2019–20 Super League season the team could not repeat the same successful results as they had at the end of the previous season. They ended the first half of the season with six successive defeats and then with a sudden surprise 2–1 victory against Basel on 15 December 2019. Both goals were scored by Schürpf. Nevertheless Häberli was released and then succeeded by Fabio Celestini. Following the winter break, five victories within six games, lifted spirits again and the second half of the season showed improvement, the team ended the season in sixth position and Schürpf had 33 appearances, scoring eight goals. He had three appearances in the cup, scoring once, but FCL were knocked out in the quarter-finals by Young Boys.

2020–21

The team started unstable into the 2020–21 Super League season, slipping immediately into the relegation zone, spending most of the time in second last position. During the second half they found more stability and achieved a number of good results, rising to the fifth position at the end of the season. Schürpf started in 23 games and had eight further appearances as substitute. In the 2020–21 Swiss Cup things ran better. Luzern advanced to the final, played on 24 May 2021 in the Stadion Wankdorf in Bern. Luzern beat St. Gallen 3–1, with Schürpf giving the assist to the first goal and scoring the third, as they won the trophy.

2021–22

In the first game of their 2021–22 league on 24 July Schürpf scored a brace, but it could not help the team as they were defeated 4–3 by Young Boys. However, a few days later, Schürpf injured himself and missed nine league games, two in the cup and both qualifying matches to the 2021–22 Conference League. Then he missed the majority of the second half of the season through an injury as well. Things ran badly for the team, right from the very beginning. In November Fabio Celestini's contract as FCL head coach was terminated. In December Mario Frick was appointed new head coach. However, throughout the season, the team remained permanently in the relegation zone. They ended in second last position and had to play the relegation play-offs, the first leg ending with a 2–2 draw, Luzern winning the second leg 2–0 and avoiding relegation. Schürpf had just 13 league and two cup appearances this season.

2022–23

In the first game of their 2022–23 season Schürpf was substituted out with torn muscle fibre and he missed the next two games. He also missed two more due to a suspension, but the he fought his was back to becoming regular player in the team. He had 21 appearances in the starting eleven and nine further appearances as substitute. The team ended the season in fourth position in the league table. Following the conclusion of the 2022–23 Swiss Super League season, Schürpf decided to move on. In his six and a half seasons with Luzern, Schürpf had scored 51 goals in 198 games.

=== Grasshopper Club ===
On 19 June 2023, he signed a one-year contract with Grasshopper Club Zürich under head coach Bruno Berner, with an option to extend for a further year. Sadly, he missed the start of the season due to an injury picked up in his first week of training. He gave his debut in a Swiss Cup game against SV Schaffhausen from the 2. Liga Interregional, the 5th tier of Swiss football, where he came on in the last minutes of the game and scored the final goal of the 4–0 away victory. He played his domestic league debut for the team in the home game in the Letzigrund, as substitute coming on in the 85th minute, as the Grasshoppers were defeated 1–0 by his previous employers. After three further games as substitute, he played his first game in the starting formation against Yverdon on 7 October. He scored his first league goal for his new team on 22 October in the home game as GC won 2–1 against Lugano. He scored his second goal in the Zürich Derby on 28 January 2024, profiting from a defensive mistake in the 95th minute to win the game 2–1 in the last minute of the game. On 7 April 2024, he scored a brace in a 2–3 away loss to Yverdon-Sport FC. On 18 April 2024, the option to extend his contract was automatically activated, keeping him at the club for a further year. Despite some injuries, he made 33 appearances for the record champions and scored four league goals in his debut season in Zürich.

He scored his first goal of the 2024–25 season on 27 July 2024, against his old club FC Luzern. On 18 August 2024, he scored a hattrick in a 9–0 away win in the first round of the 2024–25 Swiss Cup against fifth tier FC Regensdorf, scoring the first three goals of the game in just under 30 minutes. On 17 June 2025, Grasshoppers announced that he would depart the club at the end of the season.

=== Retirement ===
On 7 July 2025, he announced his retirement from professional football and joined Bluewin (Swisscom's broadcasting outlet) as football expert for the Swiss Super League.

== Honours and titles ==
Basel

- Swiss Championship at U-18 level: 2005–06
- Swiss Cup Winner at U-19/18 level: 2005–06
- Swiss Super League: 2007–08, 2009–10, 2010–11, 2011–12
- Swiss Cup: 2009–10, 2011–12
- Uhrencup Winner: 2011

Vaduz

- Challenge League champions and promotion: 2013–14
- Liechtenstein Football Cup: 2013–14, 2014–15, 2015–16, 2016–17

Luzern

- Swiss Cup: 2020–21
