= Ismajl Beka =

Kosovan footballer (born 1999)

Personal information
- Date of birth: 31 October 1999 (age 27)
- Place of birth: Frauenfeld, Switzerland
- Height: 1.97 m (6 ft 6 in)
- Position: Centre-back

Team information
- Current team: FC Rapperswil-Jona (on loan from Grasshopper)
- Number: 4

Youth career
- –2016: FC Wil

Senior career*
| Years | Team | Apps | (Gls) |
| 2016–2019 | FC Wil U21 | 47 | (6) |
| 2018–2020 | FC Wil | 7 | (0) |
| 2020–2022 | FC Rapperswil-Jona | 44 | (5) |
| 2022 | FC Wil | 6 | (1) |
| 2022–2026 | Luzern | 35 | (1) |
| 2025 | Luzern II | 11 | (0) |
| 2026– | Grasshopper | 4 | (0) |
| 2026– | → FC Rapperswil-Jona (loan) | 2 | (0) |

International career^{‡}
| 2017–2018 | Kosovo U19 | 5 | (0) |
| 2023– | Kosovo | 1 | (0) |
- * Club domestic league appearances and goals as of 18 September 2026 ‡ National team caps and goals as of 12 September 2023

Ismajl Beka (born 31 October 1999) is a professional footballer who plays as a centre-back for Swiss Challenge League side FC Rapperswil-Jona, on loan from Grasshopper. Born in Switzerland, he plays for the Kosovo national team.

== Club career ==
=== Rapperswil-Jona ===
On 10 February 2020, Beka signed a one-and-a-half-year contract with Swiss Promotion League club FC Rapperswil-Jona. After the transfer, his debut and the league was postponed due to COVID-19 pandemic. His debut with Rapperswil-Jona came on 6 August in the 2019–20 Swiss Cup quarter-final against Sion after being named in the starting line-up. His league debut with Rapperswil-Jona came nine days later in a 1–1 away draw against Bellinzona after being named in the starting line-up. Four days after league debut, he scored his first goal for Rapperswil-Jona in his third appearance for the club in a 2–1 home win over FC Breitenrain Bern in Swiss Promotion League.

=== Return to FC Wil ===
On 10 June 2022, Beka signed a two-year contract with Swiss Challenge League club FC Wil. His debut with Wil came on 17 July in a 2–0 home win against Neuchâtel Xamax after being named in the starting line-up. Fourteen days after debut, he scored his first goal for Wil in his third appearance for the club in a 2–0 home win over Liechtensteiner club Vaduz in Swiss Challenge League.

=== Luzern ===
On 31 August 2022, Beka signed a three-year contract with Swiss Super League club Luzern and received squad number 30. His debut with Luzern came four days later in a 0–2 home defeat against Servette after coming on as a substitute at 69th minute in place of Leny Meyer. He made two further appearances from the bench in 2022. For the second half of the season he became a fixed starter in Luzern's defense, missing just one game due to yellow card accumulation. His upward trajectory was abruptly cut short on 8 October 2023, when he was substituted due to injury after 55 minutes in a league match against Lausanne-Sport. The club later confirmed that he had ruptured his anterior cruciate ligament and would miss the remainder of the season. Despite the injury, his contract was renewed on 15 December 2023 until summer 2026.

He returned to Luzern's matchday squad more than a year later in December 2024, but remained an unused substitute. His return to was delayed further on 31 January 2025, when he suffered a metatarsal bone fracture in training, sidelining him for at least a further two months. He finally made his return in the final games of the 2024–25 season, making three appearances.

=== Grasshopper ===
On 23 December 2025, Grasshopper announced that they had signed Beka as of 1 January 2026 for an undisclosed fee. He was nominated to the starting lineup in the first league match after the winter break. Unfortunately, his debut for the Swiss record champions ended with him being sent off following a high-boot challenge in the 90th minute of a 1–3 home loss to Thun. He made three further appearances during the season.

==== Loan to FC Rapperswil-Jona ====
On 7 September 2026, he returned to FC Rapperswil-Jona on loan for the 2026–27 season.

== International career ==
=== Youth ===
On 1 October 2017, Beka was named as part of the Kosovo U19 squad for 2018 UEFA European Under-19 Championship qualifications. His debut came two days later in a 2018 UEFA European Under-19 Championship qualification match against Austria U19 after being named in the starting line-up.

On 4 October 2018, Beka received a call-up from Kosovo U21 for the 2019 UEFA European Under-21 Championship qualification match against Israel U21, he was an unused substitute in that match.

=== Senior ===
In August 2023, Beka received his first call-up to the Kosovo senior national team by head coach Primož Gliha, for two UEFA Euro 2024 qualifying matches against Switzerland and Romania.
