= Sofyan Chader =

French footballer (born 2000)

Personal information
- Date of birth: 12 May 2000 (age 26)
- Place of birth: Belley, France
- Height: 1.78 m (5 ft 10 in)
- Position: Midfielder

Senior career*
Years	Team	Apps	(Gls)
2018–2019	Lyon-Duchère II	9	(1)
2019–2020	Vaulx	12	(3)
2020–2022	Clermont II	5	(5)
2020–2022	Clermont	23	(0)
2021–2022	→ Stade Lausanne Ouchy (loan)	25	(7)
2022–2025	Luzern	43	(8)
- * Club domestic league appearances and goals as of 15 June 2025 ‡ National team caps and goals as of 3 November 2019

Sofyan Chader (born 12 May 2000) is a French professional footballer who plays as a midfielder.

== Career ==
On 3 January 2020, Chader signed a professional contract with Clermont. He made his professional debut with the club in a 1–0 Ligue 2 loss to Paris FC on 21 February 2020.

On 13 July 2021, he joined Stade Lausanne Ouchy in Switzerland on loan for the 2021–22 season.

On 11 August 2022, Chader returned to Switzerland and signed a three-year contract with Luzern.

== Personal life ==
Born in France, Chader is of both Algerian and Moroccan descent.
