= Lorik Emini =

Kosovan footballer (born 1999)

Personal information
- Date of birth: 29 August 1999 (age 27)
- Place of birth: Zug, Switzerland
- Height: 1.76 m (5 ft 9 in)
- Position: Midfielder

Team information
- Current team: Rapperswil-Jona
- Number: 31

Youth career
- 2006–2011: FC Rotkreuz
- 2011–2013: Zug 94
- 2013–2017: Luzern

Senior career*
Years	Team	Apps	(Gls)
2017–2020	Luzern U21	52	(11)
2019–2023	Luzern	61	(2)
2023–2025	Vaduz	56	(0)
2025–	Rapperswil-Jona	38	(4)

International career^{‡}
2014	Switzerland U15	2	(0)
2014	Switzerland U16	4	(0)
2021–	Kosovo	1	(0)
- * Club domestic league appearances and goals as of 30 September 2026 ‡ National team caps and goals as of 1 June 2021

Lorik Emini (born 29 August 1999) is a professional footballer who plays as a midfielder for Rapperswil-Jona in the Swiss Challenge League. Born in Switzerland, he plays for the Kosovo national team.

== Club career ==
=== Luzern ===
On 29 September 2019, Emini was named as a Luzern substitute for the first time in a Swiss Super League match against Basel. His professional debut with Luzern came on 1 December in a 1–4 home defeat against St. Gallen after coming on as a substitute at 90th minute in place of compatriot Idriz Voca.

=== Vaduz ===
On 1 June 2023, Emini signed a two-season contract with Vaduz.

== International career ==
During 2014, Emini has been part of Switzerland at youth international level, respectively has been part of the U15 and U16 teams and he with these teams played six matches. On 25 May 2021, Emini received a call-up from Kosovo for the friendly matches against San Marino and Malta. Seven days later, he made his debut with Kosovo in a friendly match against San Marino after coming on as a substitute at 71st minute in place of Besar Halimi.
