= Mauricio Willimann =

Swiss footballer (born 2003)

Personal information
- Birth name: Mauricio Willimann Rangel
- Date of birth: 16 January 2003 (age 23)
- Place of birth: Mexico City, Mexico
- Height: 1.83 m (6 ft 0 in)
- Position: Defender

Team information
- Current team: Kriens
- Number: 5

Youth career
- FC Hünenberg
- –2020: Luzern

Senior career*
| Years | Team | Apps | (Gls) |
| 2019–2026 | Luzern U21 | 97 | (5) |
| 2023–2026 | Luzern | 7 | (0) |
| 2024–2025 | → Schaffhausen (loan) | 25 | (0) |
| 2026– | Kriens | 9 | (0) |

International career
| 2017–2018 | Switzerland U15 | 7 | (0) |
| 2018–2019 | Switzerland U16 | 7 | (0) |
| 2019 | Switzerland U17 | 8 | (1) |
| 2021 | Switzerland U19 | 8 | (1) |
| 2022 | Switzerland U20 | 1 | (0) |
- * Club domestic league appearances and goals as of 18 September 2026

Mauricio Willimann Rangel (born 16 January 2003) is a footballer who plays as a defender for Swiss Challenge League club Kriens. Born in Mexico, he represented both Switzerland and Mexico at youth international level.

== Early life ==
Willimann was born in 2003 in Mexico City, Mexico, before moving to Switzerland as a child.

== Club career ==
Willimann is regarded as a Swiss prospect. As a youth player, he joined the youth academy of Swiss to Swiss top flight side FC Luzern and debuted for the club's first team during the 2022–23 season.

On 1 July 2024, Willimann was loaned by Schaffhausen.

== International career ==
Willimann was born to a Swiss father and Mexican mother. He has captained Switzerland internationally at youth level. In November 2023, Willimann received a call-up from Mexico national under-23 team.

== Style of play ==
Willimann mainly operates as a defender or midfielder and is known for his technical ability.

== Personal life ==
Willimann is the twin brother of Swiss footballer Alejandro Willimann.
