= Luuk Breedijk =

Swiss footballer

Personal information
- Full name: Luuk Johannes Christianus Breedijk
- Date of birth: 20 February 2004 (age 22)
- Place of birth: Locarno, Switzerland
- Height: 1.85 m (6 ft 1 in)
- Position: Winger

Team information
- Current team: Wil
- Number: 14

Youth career
- 2010–2012: Küssnacht
- 2012–2023: Luzern

Senior career*
Years	Team	Apps	(Gls)
2021–	Luzern U21	88	(27)
2023–	Luzern	7	(1)
2025–2026	→ Wil (loan)	28	(2)
2026–	Wil	9	(0)

International career^{‡}
2019	Switzerland U15	2	(1)
2022	Switzerland U18	3	(0)
2022	Switzerland U19	4	(1)
- * Club domestic league appearances and goals as of 30 September 2026 ‡ National team caps and goals as of 20:51, 20 October 2023 (UTC)

Luuk Johannes Christianus Breedijk (born 20 February 2004) is a Swiss professional footballer who plays as a winger for Wil in the Swiss Challenge League.

== Career ==
Breedijk is a youth product of Küssnacht, and moved to Luzern's youth academy in 2012. On 27 January 2023, he signed his first professional contract with Luzern until 2026. He made his professional debut with Luzern in a 2–0 Swiss Super League win over Basel on 23 April 2023, and scored his side's second goal in his debut.

On 17 June 2025, Breedijk was loaned by Wil in the second-tier Swiss Challenge League. During the preseason, he suffered a serious hip injury and was expected to miss at least 10 weeks.

After Breedijks loan to Wil ended, Wil signed him on a two year contract.

== International career ==
Breedijk was born in Switzerland and is of Dutch descent. He is a youth international for Switzerland, having played up to the Switzerland U19s.
