= Tyron Owusu =

Swiss footballer (born 2003)

Personal information
- Date of birth: 8 June 2003 (age 23)
- Place of birth: Luzern, Switzerland
- Height: 1.83 m (6 ft 0 in)
- Position: Midfielder

Team information
- Current team: Luzern
- Number: 24

Youth career
- –2020: Luzern

Senior career*
Years	Team	Apps	(Gls)
2020–	Luzern	78	(3)
2020–2024	Luzern U21	38	(3)

International career^{‡}
2018–2019	Switzerland U16	4	(0)
2019	Switzerland U17	5	(2)
- * Club domestic league appearances and goals as of 28 September 2026 ‡ National team caps and goals as of 08:24, 20 July 2020 (UTC)

Tyron Owusu (born 8 June 2003) is a Swiss professional footballer who plays as a midfielder for Swiss club Luzern.

== Personal life ==
Owusu is the son of the retired Ghana international Owusu Benson.

== Career statistics ==
=== Club ===
As of 11 August 2025.

Club	Season	League			Cup		Continental		Other		Total	
Club	Season	Division	Apps	Goals	Apps	Goals	Apps	Goals	Apps	Goals	Apps	Goals
Luzern	2019–20	Swiss Super League	1	0	0	0	–		0	0	1	0
Luzern	2024–25	Swiss Super League	32	1	1	0	–		0	0	33	1
Luzern	2025-26	Swiss Super League	3	0	0	0	–		0	0	3	0
Luzern	Total		36	1	1	0	0	0	0	0	37	0
Luzern U21	2020–21	1. Liga	1	0	–		–		0	0	1	0
Luzern U21	2021–22	1. Liga	4	0	–		–		0	0	4	0
Luzern U21	2022–23	Promotion League	22	2	–		–		0	0	22	2
Luzern U21	2023–24	Promotion League	11	1	–		–		0	0	11	1
Luzern U21	Total		38	3	1	0	0	0	0	0	38	3
Career total			74	4	1	0	0	0	0	0	75	4
