= Lars Villiger =

Swiss footballer

Personal information
- Date of birth: 29 April 2003 (age 23)
- Place of birth: Muri, Switzerland
- Height: 1.90 m (6 ft 3 in)
- Position: Striker

Team information
- Current team: Luzern
- Number: 27

Youth career
- 2012–2017: FC Sins
- 2017–2018: Zug 94
- 2018–2019: Kriens
- 2019–2023: Luzern

Senior career*
Years	Team	Apps	(Gls)
2021–2023	Luzern U21	48	(15)
2023–	Luzern	115	(20)

International career^{‡}
2023–	Switzerland U21	3	(2)
- * Club domestic league appearances and goals as of 28 September 2026 ‡ National team caps and goals as of 20:51, 20 October 2023 (UTC)

Lars Villiger (born 29 April 2003) is a Swiss professional footballer who plays as a striker for Luzern.

== Career ==
Villiger is a product of the youth academies of FC Sins, Zug 94, Kriens and Luzern. He began his senior career with the reserves of Luzern in 2021, where he scored 15 goals in 48 games. He signed his first professional contract with Luzern on 2 April 2023. He made his professional debut with Luzern as a substitute in a 2–1 Swiss Super League loss to Sion the same day, 2 April. He scored his first professional goal with Luzern in a 1–1 league tie with FC St. Gallen on 21 May 2023.

== International career ==
Villiger is a youth international for Switzerland. He was called up to the Switzerland U21s in the fall of 2023.
