= Samuel Alabi =

Ghanaian footballer

Personal information
- Full name: Samuel Alabi Borquaye
- Date of birth: 6 May 2000 (age 26)
- Place of birth: Ghana
- Height: 1.70 m (5 ft 7 in)
- Position: Midfielder

Team information
- Current team: Petržalka
- Number: 5

Youth career
- Dreams

Senior career*
Years	Team	Apps	(Gls)
2018–2019	Dreams	5	(0)
2019–2020	Ashdod	24	(1)
2020–2024	Luzern	7	(0)
2022	Luzern II	4	(1)
2022–2023	→ Ashdod (loan)	6	(1)
2023	→ Baden (loan)	1	(0)
2024–	Petržalka	42	(0)
- * Club domestic league appearances and goals as of 25 May 2026

Samuel Alabi Borquaye (born 6 May 2000) is a Ghanaian footballer who plays as a midfielder for Slovak club Petržalka.

== Career ==
On 12 June 2020, Alabi signed for the Israeli Premier League club in Ashdod.

On 22 September 2020 Alabi signed in FC Luzern for $1 Million.

On 15 September 2022, Alabi was loaned back to Ashdod for the 2022–23 season.

On 8 July 2023, Alabi was loaned to Baden.
