= Nicky Beloko =

Cameroonian-Swiss footballer (born 2000)

Personal information
- Full name: Nicky Stéphane Medja Beloko
- Date of birth: 16 February 2000 (age 26)
- Place of birth: Ebolowa, Cameroon
- Height: 1.84 m (6 ft 0 in)
- Position: Midfielder

Team information
- Current team: Lausanne-Sport
- Number: 16

Youth career
- 2012–2013: FC Aigle
- 2013–2014: Vevey-Sports
- 2014–2015: Lausanne-Sport
- 2015–2018: Sion
- 2018–2020: Fiorentina

Senior career*
Years	Team	Apps	(Gls)
2016–2018	Sion II	33	(3)
2017–2018	Sion	1	(0)
2018–2021	Fiorentina	1	(0)
2019–2020	→ Gent (loan)	0	(0)
2021	→ Neuchâtel Xamax (loan)	16	(0)
2021–2022	Neuchâtel Xamax	24	(1)
2022–2025	Luzern	77	(3)
2025	Austin FC	0	(0)
2025–	Lausanne-Sport	23	(1)

International career^{‡}
2015	Switzerland U15	1	(0)
2017–2018	Switzerland U18	4	(0)
2018–2019	Switzerland U19	4	(0)
2019	Switzerland U20	2	(0)
- * Club domestic league appearances and goals as of 28 September 2026 ‡ National team caps and goals as of 18 November 2019

Nicky Stéphane Medja Beloko (born 16 February 2000) is a professional footballer who plays as a midfielder for Lausanne-Sport. Born in Cameroon, Beloko is a youth international for Switzerland.

== Club career ==
Beloko made his professional debut in a 5–1 loss to BSC Young Boys on 29 October 2017, in the Swiss Super League. He was the first player born in the year 2000 to play in the Super League.

On 18 June 2018, Beloko moved to Fiorentina. He made one appearance for Fiorentina in the Serie A, having played the second half in a 1–0 loss to Sassuolo on 29 April 2019. He played a majority of the time for the reserve squad, in the Campionato Primavera 1, making 41 appearances and scoring five goals across all competitions.

On 21 August 2019 he joined Belgian club Gent on a season-long loan with an option to buy. On 9 January 2020, Gent terminated the loan early after he made no appearances for the club up to that point.

On 16 February 2021, he joined Neuchâtel Xamax on loan for the rest of the 2020–21 season. On 30 June 2021, he joined Neuchâtel Xamax permanently.

On 6 July 2022, he transferred to Luzern with a contract through 2025, thus making his return to the Swiss Super League.

On 30 June 2025, it was announced that Beloko would join Major League Soccer side Austin FC on a deal until the end of their 2028 season. Due to personal circumstances, Beloko returned to Switzerland to sign with Lausanne-Sport on 21 August 2025 without making a single appearance for Austin. Austin allowed Beloko to leave on a free transfer, but would retain a fifteen percent sell-on clause.

== International career ==
Beloko was born in Cameroon but moved to Switzerland at a young age, deciding to represent Switzerland internationally at youth levels.

== Honours ==
Individual

- Swiss Super League Best player of the round: 2022–23 (Round 4),
