= Yvan Alounga =

Swiss footballer (born 2002)

Personal information
- Full name: Yvan Gregory Alounga Avebe
- Date of birth: 5 February 2002 (age 24)
- Place of birth: Ebolowa, Cameroon
- Height: 1.89 m (6 ft 2 in)
- Position: Forward

Team information
- Current team: Bulle
- Number: 31

Youth career
- –2019: Aarau

Senior career*
Years	Team	Apps	(Gls)
2019–2020	Aarau	30	(5)
2020–2024	Luzern	37	(1)
2021	Luzern U21	3	(0)
2022	→ Schaffhausen (loan)	13	(1)
2022–2023	→ Stade Lausanne Ouchy (loan)	16	(1)
2023–2024	→ Bellinzona (loan)	22	(2)
2024–2025	SV Lafnitz	6	(1)
2025	Politehnica Iași	4	(0)
2026	Bulle	12	(4)

International career
2019	Switzerland U18	2	(0)
2022	Switzerland U20	1	(0)
- * Club domestic league appearances and goals as of 26 June 2026

Yvan Gregory Alounga Avebe (born 5 February 2002) is a professional footballer who plays as a forward for Swiss Promotion League club Bulle. Born in Cameroon, he represents Switzerland at youth level.

== Club career ==
On 22 January 2022, Alounga joined Swiss Challenge League side Schaffhausen on loan until the end of the season.

On 17 July 2023, Alounga was loaned to Bellinzona.

On 22 June 2024, Alounga signed with SV Lafnitz in Austria.

== Honours ==
Luzern

- Swiss Cup: 2020–21
