= Pius Dorn =

German footballer

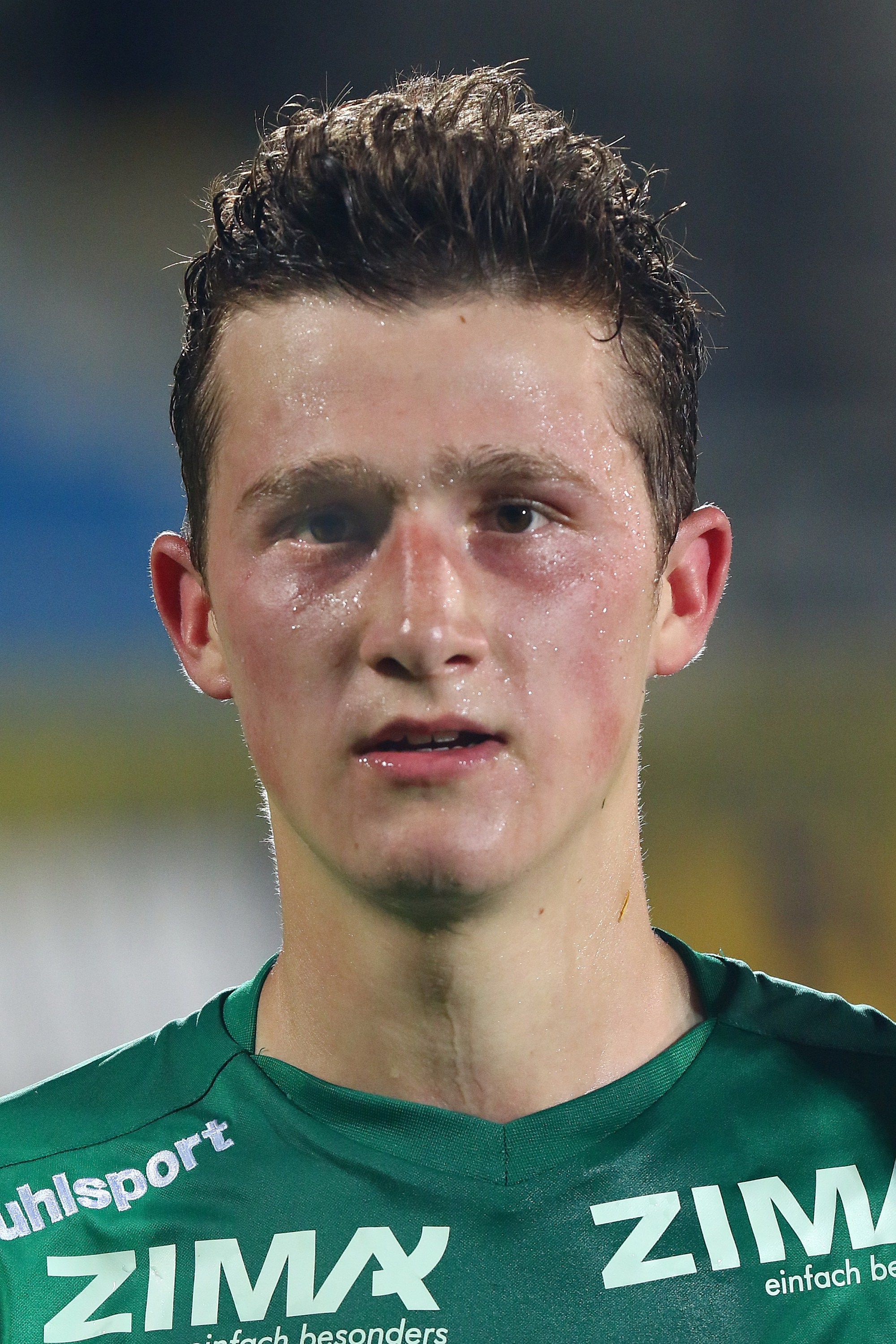
- Dorn with Austria Lustenau in 2018

Personal information
- Date of birth: 24 September 1996 (age 30)
- Place of birth: Freiburg im Breisgau, Germany
- Height: 1.78 m (5 ft 10 in)
- Position: Midfielder

Team information
- Current team: Luzern
- Number: 20

Youth career
- –2008: SC Kappel
- 2008–2015: Freiburg

Senior career*
| Years | Team | Apps | (Gls) |
| 2015–2017 | Freiburg II | 45 | (4) |
| 2017–2019 | Austria Lustenau | 58 | (1) |
| 2019–2021 | Vaduz | 69 | (6) |
| 2021–2022 | Thun | 35 | (2) |
| 2022– | Luzern | 140 | (15) |
- * Club domestic league appearances and goals as of 28 September 2026

Pius Dorn (born 24 September 1996) is a German professional footballer who plays as a midfielder for Swiss club Luzern.

== Club career ==
Dorn made his Austrian Football First League debut for Austria Lustenau on 4 August 2017 in a game against Wiener Neustadt.

In the summer of 2022, Dorn signed a two-year contract with Swiss Super League club Luzern.
