= Denis Simani =

Swiss footballer (born 1991)

Personal information
- Date of birth: 13 October 1991 (age 35)
- Place of birth: St. Gallen, Switzerland
- Height: 1.87 m (6 ft 2 in)
- Position: Defender

Team information
- Current team: Vaduz
- Number: 6

Youth career
- 2008: Gossau

Senior career*
Years	Team	Apps	(Gls)
2009–2010	Gossau	10	(0)
2010–2012	Grasshopper II	23	(1)
2011–2012	→ Brühl (loan)	21	(1)
2012–2013	Basel II	22	(1)
2014–2019	Rapperswil-Jona	67	(6)
2019–2022	Vaduz	80	(7)
2022–2024	Luzern	64	(1)
2024–	Vaduz	49	(4)
- * Club domestic league appearances and goals as of 28 September 2026

Denis Simani (born 13 October 1991) is a Swiss-Kosovan professional footballer who plays as a defender for Liechtensteiner Swiss Super League club Vaduz.

== Club career ==
On 4 January 2022, Simani signed a contract with Luzern until 30 June 2024.

On 2 May 2024, Simani agreed to return to Vaduz on a two-season contract.

== International career ==
Born in Switzerland, Simani is of Albanian descent. He was called up to represent the Albania U21s in 2011.
