= Leny Meyer =

Swiss footballer

Personal information
- Full name: Leny Remo Meyer
- Date of birth: 1 July 2004 (age 22)
- Place of birth: Vevey, Switzerland
- Height: 1.82 m (6 ft 0 in)
- Position: Left-back

Team information
- Current team: Famalicão
- Number: 5

Youth career
- 2012–2022: Luzern

Senior career*
Years	Team	Apps	(Gls)
2021–2024	Luzern U21	28	(2)
2022–2024	Luzern	18	(1)
2024–2026	VfB Stuttgart II	58	(2)
2026–	Famalicão	0	(0)

International career^{‡}
2019	Switzerland U15	4	(0)
2019	Switzerland U16	1	(0)
2021–2022	Switzerland U18	4	(0)
2022	Switzerland U19	5	(0)
- * Club domestic league appearances and goals as of 30 May 2026 ‡ National team caps and goals as of 20:51, 20 October 2023 (UTC)

Leny Remo Meyer (born 1 July 2004) is a Swiss professional footballer who plays as a left-back for Liga Portugal club Famalicão.

== Career ==
Meyer is a product of Luzern's youth academy, and began his senior career with their reserves in 2021. On 17 June 2022, he signed his first professional contract with the club until 2025. He made his professional debut with Luzern as a substitute in a 2–0 Swiss Super League win over Sion on 27 August 2022.

On 30 August 2024, Meyer signed with VfB Stuttgart II in German 3. Liga.

On 12 June 2026, Meyer joined Famalicão in the Portuguese top tier on a four-year deal.

== International career ==
Meyer is a youth international for Switzerland. He was called up to the Switzerland U19s in 2022.

== Personal life ==
Meyer is the son of Swiss football director and former international footballer Rémo Meyer.
