= Severin Ottiger =

Swiss footballer

Personal information
- Date of birth: 20 April 2003 (age 23)
- Place of birth: Sursee, Switzerland
- Height: 1.83 m (6 ft 0 in)
- Position: Right-back

Team information
- Current team: Winterthur
- Number: 21

Youth career
- 2010–2016: SC Eich
- 2016–2021: Luzern

Senior career*
Years	Team	Apps	(Gls)
2020–2024	Luzern U21	43	(5)
2021–2026	Luzern	98	(4)
2026–	Winterthur	9	(1)

International career^{‡}
2019	Switzerland U16	2	(0)
2019	Switzerland U17	3	(0)
2021	Switzerland U19	8	(0)
2022–2023	Switzerland U20	3	(0)
2023–2024	Switzerland U21	8	(0)
- * Club domestic league appearances and goals as of 28 September 2026 ‡ National team caps and goals as of 11 October 2024

Severin Ottiger (born 20 April 2003) is a Swiss professional footballer who plays as a right-back for Swiss Challenge League club Winterthur.

== Career ==
Ottiger is a youth product of SC Eich, before moving to the youth academy of Luzern in 2016. In 2020, he started training with Luzern's reserves. In July 2021, he was promoted to Luzern's senior team for their campaign in the Swiss Super League. He made his professional debut with Luzern in a 2–0 Swiss Super League win over Servette on 18 December 2021. On 28 April 2023, he extended his contract with Luzern until 2027.

On 9 July 2026, Ottiger joined Winterthur, recently relegated to the second tier, on a two-season contract.

== International career ==
Ottiger is a youth international for Switzerland. He was called up to the Switzerland U21s in 2023.
