= 2022–23 Swiss Super League =

126th season of top-tier Swiss football

Swiss Super League
- Season: 2022–23
- Dates: 16 July 2022 – 29 May 2023
- Champions: Young Boys; 16th title
- Relegated: Sion
- Champions League: Young Boys; Servette
- Europa League: Lugano
- Europa Conference League: Luzern; Basel
- Matches: 180
- Goals: 539 (2.99 per match)
- Top goalscorer: Jean-Pierre Nsame (21 goals)
- Biggest home win: 6–1; YB–SER (22 Apr 2023); STG–BAS (14 May 2023)
- Biggest away win: 0–6; WIN–LUZ (10 Sep 2022)
- Highest scoring: 2–7; SIO–STG (12 Nov 2022)
- Longest winning run: 4 matches Luzern
- Longest unbeaten run: 18 matches Young Boys
- Longest winless run: 13 matches Zürich
- Longest losing run: 3 matches
- Highest attendance: 31,500; Young Boys
- Total attendance: 2,370,901
- Average attendance: 13,172

The 2022–23 Swiss Super League (referred to as the Credit Suisse Super League for sponsoring reasons) was the 126th season of top-tier competitive football in Switzerland and the 20th under its current name and format. With this season, the Swiss Super League became the longest continuously running top-flight national league.

== Overview ==
A total of ten teams are competing in the league: nine teams of the previous season will participate in the league again. FC Lausanne-Sport, who came in last place, were relegated and are replaced by the 2021–22 Swiss Challenge League champions Winterthur. Luzern remains in the league as the winner of the Relegation/Promotion playoff. Zürich are the defending champions.

After Swiss teams gained 7.75 points in European championships in the 2021–22 season, the Swiss Football Association jumped five spots in the UEFA association ranking to rank 14, granting them five spots in European championships in the 2023–24 season. This means that first and second ranked teams of the 2022–23 season will participate in the third and second rounds of the 2023–24 UEFA Champions League qualification, respectively, while the third and fourth enter the second round of the 2023–24 UEFA Europa Conference League qualification. Furthermore, the champion of the 2022-23 Swiss Cup enters the third qualification round for the 2023–24 UEFA Europa League.

Due to the format change and the increased number of teams starting with the 2023–24 Swiss Super League, this season will function as a transition season. As a result, no teams will be directly relegated to the 2023–24 Swiss Challenge League. Instead the last-placed team will play a relegation playoff against the third team of the 2022–23 Swiss Challenge League.

=== Schedule ===
The playing schedule of the season, as well as dates and times for the first nine matchdays were announced on 17 June 2022. The first matchday would be held on the weekend of 16 and 17 July 2022. However, the first round match Luzern – Grasshoppers is postponed until 10 August 2022, due to lack of venues. The match Luzern – Basel, originally scheduled for 31 July 2022 (Matchday 3), is also postponed to 9 November 2022. Furthermore, scheduled dates for champion Zürich for matchdays 4, 5, and 8 may be swapped subject to their Champions League qualifier schedule.

The exact schedule for matchdays 10 through 18 were announced on 2 September 2022. Due to the 2022 FIFA World Cup, which will be held in November and December 2022, the league will go on a two-month break, after matchday 16 on 13 November 2022. The winter break will thus occur two rounds earlier than usual, with matchdays 17 and 18 to be held in January 2023. On 22 November 2022, fixtures of matchdays 19 through 27 were scheduled. Matchdays 28 through 36 were scheduled on 15 March 2023.

The last matchday will be on 29 May 2023. Following the end of the season, the two legs of the Relegation Play-off will be played on 3 and 6 June 2023, respectively.

== Teams ==
=== Stadia and locations ===
Location of the 2022–23 Swiss Super League teams

Club	Location	Stadium	Capacity	Ref
Basel	Basel	St. Jakob-Park	37,994	
Grasshopper	Zürich	Letzigrund	26,103	
Lugano	Lugano	Stadio Cornaredo	6,390	
Luzern	Lucerne	Swissporarena	16,490	
Servette	Geneva	Stade de Genève	28,833	
Sion	Sion	Stade Tourbillon	14,283	
St. Gallen	St. Gallen	Kybunpark	19,455	
Winterthur	Winterthur	Stadion Schützenwiese	8,400	
Young Boys	Bern	Stadion Wankdorf	31,120	
Zürich	Zürich	Letzigrund	26,103	

=== Personnel and kits ===
Team	President	Manager	Captain	Kit manufacturer	Shirt sponsor
Basel	(Switzerland) Reto Baumgartner	(Germany) Heiko Vogel (interim)	(Switzerland) Fabian Frei	Macron	Novartis
Grasshopper	(Switzerland) András Gurovits	(Switzerland) Giorgio Contini	(Albania) Amir Abrashi	Adidas	Tianjin Seagull
Lugano	(Switzerland) Philippe Regazzoni	(Switzerland) Mattia Croci-Torti	(Uruguay) Jonathan Sabbatini	Erreà	AIL
Luzern	(Switzerland) Stefan Wolf	(Liechtenstein) Mario Frick	(Switzerland) Ardon Jashari	Craft	Otto’s
Servette	(Switzerland) Didier Fischer	(Switzerland) Alain Geiger	(Switzerland) Jérémy Frick	Adidas	La Praille M3 Groupe
Sion	(Switzerland) Christian Constantin	(Italy) Paolo Tramezzani	(Switzerland) Anto Grgić	Macron	OIKEN
St. Gallen	(Switzerland) Matthias Hüppi	(Germany) Peter Zeidler	(Germany) Lukas Görtler	Jako	St.Galler Kantonalbank
Winterthur	(Switzerland) Mike Keller	(Switzerland) Bruno Berner	(Kosovo) Granit Lekaj	gpard	Keller Druckmesstechnik
Young Boys	(Switzerland) Hanspeter Kienberger	(Switzerland) Raphaël Wicky	(Switzerland) Fabian Lustenberger	Nike	Plus500
Zürich	(Switzerland) Ancillo Canepa	(Denmark) Bo Henriksen	(Switzerland) Yanick Brecher	Nike	Nokera AG

=== Managerial changes ===
Team	Outgoing manager	Manner of departure	Date of departure	Position in table	Incoming manager	Date of appointment	Ref.
Basel	(Spain) Guille Abascal	End of interim period	23 May 2022	Pre-season	(Switzerland) Alexander Frei	23 May 2022	
Winterthur	(Switzerland) Alexander Frei	Departure	23 May 2022	Pre-season	(Switzerland) Bruno Berner	30 May 2022	
Zürich	(Germany) André Breitenreiter	Departure	24 May 2022	Pre-season	(Germany) Franco Foda	8 June 2022	
Young Boys	(Switzerland) Matteo Vanetta	End of interim period	2 June 2022	Pre-season	(Switzerland) Raphaël Wicky	2 June 2022	
Zürich	(Germany) Franco Foda	Termination	21 September 2022	9th	(Switzerland) Genesio Colatrella (interim)	23 September 2022	
Zürich	(Switzerland) Genesio Colatrella (interim)	End of interim period	10 October 2022	10th	(Denmark) Bo Henriksen	10 October 2022	
Sion	(Italy) Paolo Tramezzani	Termination	20 November 2022	10th	(Switzerland) Fabio Celestini	21 November 2022	
Basel	(Switzerland) Alexander Frei	Termination	7 February 2023	7th	(Germany) Heiko Vogel (interim)	7 February 2023	
Sion	(Switzerland) Fabio Celestini	Termination	3 March 2023	9th	(France) David Bettoni	7 March 2023	
Sion	(France) David Bettoni	Contract dissolution	15 May 2023	10th	(Italy) Paolo Tramezzani	16 May 2023	

== League table ==
Pos	Team	Pld	W	D	L	GF	GA	GD	Pts	Qualification or relegation
1	Young Boys (C)	36	21	11	4	82	30	+52	74	Qualification for the Champions League play-off round
2	Servette	36	14	16	6	53	48	+5	58	Qualification for the Champions League second qualifying round
3	Lugano	36	15	12	9	59	47	+12	57	Qualification for the Europa League play-off round
4	Luzern	36	13	11	12	56	52	+4	50	Qualification for the Europa Conference League second qualifying round
5	Basel	36	11	14	11	51	50	+1	47	Qualification for the Europa Conference League second qualifying round
6	St. Gallen	36	11	12	13	66	52	+14	45	
7	Grasshopper	36	12	8	16	56	64	−8	44	
8	Zürich	36	10	14	12	41	55	−14	44	
9	Winterthur	36	8	8	20	32	66	−34	32	
10	Sion (R)	36	7	10	19	41	73	−32	31	Qualification for the relegation play-off

Source: Swiss Super League
Rules for classification: 1) Points; 2) Goal difference; 3) Goals scored; 4) Head-to-head goal difference; 5) Away goals scored; 6) Draw.
(C) Champions; (R) Relegated

== Results ==
=== First and second rounds ===
Home \ Away	BAS	GCZ	LUG	LUZ	SER	SIO	STG	WIN	YB	ZÜR
Basel	—	5–1	0–2	2–3	1–1	0–0	3–2	3–1	0–0	0–0
Grasshopper	1–0	—	2–1	1–3	2–3	4–4	3–2	3–0	1–2	1–1
Lugano	1–0	1–1	—	1–2	1–0	2–3	2–3	3–1	1–4	2–0
Luzern	0–2	1–1	3–1	—	0–2	2–0	3–3	1–1	1–2	2–2
Servette	0–0	3–1	2–2	1–1	—	2–2	1–0	1–0	0–0	3–2
Sion	2–1	2–2	2–3	2–0	0–0	—	2–7	1–3	0–3	0–1
St. Gallen	1–1	2–1	1–1	4–1	1–1	1–2	—	2–0	2–1	2–0
Winterthur	1–1	1–0	1–4	0–6	1–2	1–0	1–0	—	1–5	1–1
Young Boys	3–1	1–1	3–0	3–0	3–0	1–1	2–1	5–1	—	4–0
Zürich	2–4	1–4	1–2	0–0	4–1	0–3	1–0	0–0	0–0	—

Source: Swiss Super League (in German)
Legend: Blue = home team win; Yellow = draw; Red = away team win.
For upcoming matches, an "a" indicates there is an article about the rivalry between the two participants.

=== Third and fourth rounds ===
Home \ Away	BAS	GCZ	LUG	LUZ	SER	SIO	STG	WIN	YB	ZÜR
Basel	—	3–1	1–1	0–2	2–2	3–1	1–1	2–0	1–1	0–2
Grasshopper	1–0	—	2–1	2–0	2–3	1–3	2–2	2–1	4–1	1–2
Lugano	2–2	5–1	—	1–1	1–1	2–0	1–1	2–1	2–0	2–0
Luzern	0–1	1–0	2–2	—	0–1	1–2	1–1	3–1	1–1	4–1
Servette	3–3	2–1	0–0	0–3 (Note: Original result: 0–1. On 21 March 2023, the Swiss Football League handed Servette a 0–3 forfeit loss in this game, as they used an ineligible player in the game.)	—	5–0	1–1	1–1	2–1	4–0
Sion	1–2	1–2	1–1	1–2	2–2	—	0–4	0–1	0–2	0–1
St. Gallen	6–1	1–1	1–2	2–2	3–0	4–0	—	2–3	0–2	2–2
Winterthur	1–4	1–2	1–0	1–2	0–1	1–1	1–0	—	1–1	0–2
Young Boys	3–0	2–0	1–1	5–1	6–1	4–0	5–1	2–1	—	1–1
Zürich	1–1	2–1	2–3	2–1	1–1	2–2	1–0	1–1	2–2	—

Source: Swiss Super League (in German)
Legend: Blue = home team win; Yellow = draw; Red = away team win.
For upcoming matches, an "a" indicates there is an article about the rivalry between the two participants.

== Relegation play-off ==
The relegation play-off will be played in a two-legged game between the last place team of the Super League and the third placed team of the Challenge League. The first leg will be held on 3 June 2023, with the representative of the Super League hosting. The second leg will be held on 6 June 2023. Winner of the play-off is whichever teams scores most in both games (no away goals rule). In case of a tie at the end of the two games, 30 minutes of extra time (two times 15 minutes) are added, followed by a penalty shoot-out, in case the teams are still tied.

=== First leg ===
3 June 2023
18:00 CEST (UTC+2)

Sion	0–2	Lausanne-Ouchy
	Report	26' Mulaj; 57' Bamba

Stade Tourbillon, Sion
Attendance: 9,050
Referee: Luca Cibelli

=== Second leg ===
6 June 2023
20:30 CEST (UTC+2)

Lausanne-Ouchy	4–2	Sion
Mulaj 6', 89'; Ajdini 34'; Okou 81'	Report	23' Zuffi; 39' (pen.) Grgic

Stade Olympique de la Pontaise, Lausanne
Attendance: 10,754
Referee: Urs Schnyder

Lausanne-Ouchy wins 6–2 on aggregate, while Sion were relegated to the Swiss Challenge League.

== Statistics ==
=== Top goalscorers ===
Rank	Player	Club	Goals
1	(Cameroon) Jean-Pierre Nsame	Young Boys	21
2	(Switzerland) Cedric Itten	Young Boys	19
3	(Slovenia) Žan Celar	Lugano	16
4	(Ivory Coast) Emmanuel Latte Lath	St. Gallen	14
5	(Switzerland) Zeki Amdouni	Basel	12
5	(Benin) Tosin Aiyegun	Zürich	12
5	(Ivory Coast) Chris Bedia	Servette	12
8	(Switzerland) Andi Zeqiri	Basel	11
8	(Switzerland) Jérémy Guillemenot	St. Gallen	11
8	(Germany) Max Meyer	Luzern	11

=== Hat-tricks ===
Player	Club	Against	Result	Date
(Ivory Coast) Emmanuel Latte Lath	FC St. Gallen	FC Sion	7–2 (A)	12 November 2022
(Benin) Tosin Aiyegun	FC Zürich	Servette	4–1 (H)	13 November 2022
(Cameroon) Jean-Pierre Nsame	Young Boys	FC Winterthur	5–1 (H)	29 January 2023
(Switzerland) Cedric Itten	Young Boys	FC Basel	3–0 (H)	19 March 2023

=== Top assists ===
As of 30 April 2023

Rank	Player	Club	Assists
1	(Switzerland) Ulisses Garcia	Young Boys	9
1	(Switzerland) Renato Steffen	FC Lugano	9
3	(Switzerland) Cedric Itten	Young Boys	8
3	(Japan) Hayao Kawabe	Grasshoppers	8
5	(Germany) Lukas Görtler	FC St. Gallen	7
6	(Germany) Pius Dorn	FC Luzern	6
6	(Switzerland) Christian Fassnacht	Young Boys	6
6	(Switzerland) Jérémy Guillemenot	FC St. Gallen	6
6	(Switzerland) Dereck Kutesa	Servette	6
6	(Switzerland) Pascal Schürpf	FC Luzern	6

== Awards ==
=== Best Player ===
==== Player of the Round ====
The best player of the Super League and Challenge League for each matchday is voted for by the viewers from among a selection of players.

Round 1						Round 2						Round 3						Round 4					
#	Nat	Player	Team	L	Ref	#	Nat	Player	Team	L	Ref	#	Nat	Player	Team	L	Ref	#	Nat	Player	Team	L	Ref
1	(Serbia)	Samir Ramizi	Winterthur	(SL)		10	(Switzerland)	Cedric Itten	Young Boys	(SL)		19	(Portugal)	André Moreira	Grasshopper	(SL)		28	(Germany)	Pius Dorn	Luzern	(SL)	
2	(Japan)	Hayao Kawabe	Grasshopper	(SL)		11	(Italy)	Mario Balotelli	Sion	(SL)		20	(France)	Andy Diouf	Basel	(SL)		29	(Switzerland)	Nicky Beloko	Luzern	(SL)	
3	(Azerbaijan)	Renat Dadashov	Grasshopper	(SL)		12	(Tunisia)	Mohamed Dräger	Luzern	(SL)		21	(Switzerland)	Zeki Amdouni	Basel	(SL)		30	not awarded				
4	(Switzerland)	Nicky Beloko	Luzern	(SL)		13	(Germany)	Max Meyer	Luzern	(SL)		22	(Czech Republic)	Martin Frýdek	Luzern	(SL)		31	(Switzerland)	Fabian Rieder	Young Boys	(SL)	
5	(Germany)	Lukas Görtler	St. Gallen	(SL)		14	(Switzerland)	Dejan Sorgić	Luzern	(SL)		23	(Ghana)	Lawrence Ati-Zigi	St. Gallen	(SL)		32	(Switzerland)	Anthony Racioppi	Young Boys	(SL)	
6	(Germany)	Lukas Watkowiak	St. Gallen	(SL)		15	(Ghana)	Lawrence Ati-Zigi	St. Gallen	(SL)		24	(Switzerland)	Nicky Beloko	Luzern	(SL)		33	(Portugal)	André Moreira	Grasshopper	(SL)	
7	(Mali)	Daouda Guindo	St. Gallen	(SL)		16	(Ivory Coast)	Emmanuel Latte Lath	St. Gallen	(SL)		25	(Switzerland)	Noe Holenstein	Winterthur	(SL)		34	(Cameroon)	Jean-Pierre Nsame	Young Boys	(SL)	
8	(Switzerland)	Ardon Jashari	Luzern	(SL)		17	(Switzerland)	Pascal Schürpf	Luzern	(SL)		26	(Germany)	Meritan Shabani	Grasshopper	(SL)		35	(France)	Sofyan Chader	Luzern	(SL)	
9	(Germany)	Marius Müller	Luzern	(SL)		18	(Germany)	Max Meyer	Luzern	(SL)		27	(France)	Sofyan Chader	Luzern	(SL)		36	(Nigeria)	Franklin Sasere	Vaduz	(ChL)	

==== Player of the Month ====
The Player of the Month in the Super League and Challenge League is chosen by the viewers from among five nominees. The following table shows the winner (in dark grey) and the other nominees for each month where a Player of the Month was chosen.

July				August				September			
Nat	Player	Team	L	Nat	Player	Team	L	Nat	Player	Team	L
(Switzerland)	Jérémy Frick	Servette	(SL)	(Azerbaijan)	Renat Dadashov	Grasshopper	(SL)	(Switzerland)	Ardon Jashari	Luzern	(SL)
(France)	Wilfried Kanga	Young Boys	(SL)	(Germany)	Lukas Görtler	St. Gallen	(SL)	(France)	Timothé Cognat	Servette	(SL)
(Switzerland)	Basil Stillhart	St. Gallen	(SL)	(Switzerland)	Cedric Itten	Young Boys	(SL)	(Switzerland)	Valon Fazliu	Aarau	(ChL)
(Guadeloupe)	Nathanaël Saintini	Sion	(SL)	(Ivory Coast)	Koro Kone	Yverdon	(ChL)	(Netherlands)	Wouter Burger	Basel	(SL)
(Ivory Coast)	Koro Kone	Yverdon	(ChL)	(Kosovo)	Shkelqim Vladi	Aarau	(ChL)	(Switzerland)	Filip Stojilković	Sion	(SL)
October				November				February			
(Germany)	Max Meyer	Luzern	(SL)	(Ghana)	Lawrence Ati-Zigi	St. Gallen	(SL)	(Switzerland)	Zeki Amdouni	Basel	(SL)
(France)	David Douline	Servette	(SL)	(Nigeria)	Tosin Aiyegun	Zürich	(SL)	(Ivory Coast)	Chris Bedia	Servette	(SL)
(Democratic Republic of the Congo)	Timothy Fayulu	Winterthur	(SL)	(Switzerland)	Renato Steffen	Lugano	(SL)	(Nigeria)	Tosin Aiyegun	Zürich	(SL)
(Switzerland)	Fabian Rieder	Young Boys	(SL)	(France)	Teddy Okou	Lausanne-Ouchy	(ChL)	(Italy)	Francesco Ruberto	Schaffhausen	(ChL)
(Switzerland)	Anthony Sauthier	Lausanne-Ouchy	(ChL)	(Switzerland)	Marvin Keller	Wil	(ChL)	(Martinique)	Brighton Labeau	Lausanne-Sport	(ChL)
March				April				May			
(Switzerland)	Cedric Itten	Young Boys	(SL)	(Czech Republic)	Martin Frýdek	Luzern	(SL)	(Bosnia and Herzegovina)	Miroslav Stevanovic	Servette	(SL)
(Switzerland)	Zeki Amdouni	Basel	(SL)	(Switzerland)	Cedric Itten	Young Boys	(SL)	(Ivory Coast)	Emmanuel Latte Lath	St. Gallen	(SL)
(Nigeria)	Tosin Aiyegun	Zürich	(SL)	(Switzerland)	Renato Steffen	Lugano	(SL)	(Czech Republic)	Roman Macek	Lugano	(SL)
(Japan)	Ayumu Seko	Grasshopper	(SL)	(Switzerland)	Valon Fazliu	Aarau	(ChL)	(Cameroon)	Jean-Pierre Nsame	Young Boys	(SL)
(Germany)	Gabriel Kyeremateng	Thun	(ChL)	(Switzerland)	Nikolas Muci	Wil	(ChL)	(Switzerland)	Liridon Mulaj	Lausanne-Ouchy	(ChL)

==== Overall ====
First Half of the Season
Nat	Player	Team	L
(Ghana)	Lawrence Ati-Zigi	St. Gallen	(SL)
(Switzerland)	Cedric Itten	Young Boys	(SL)
(France)	David Douline	Servette	(SL)
(Ivory Coast)	Koro Kone	Yverdon	(ChL)
(Switzerland)	Valon Fazliu	Aarau	(ChL)

==== Team of the Season ====
The Team of the Season was selected by votes for each position by the viewers from among a selection. The winners were announced on 29 June 2023.

Team of the Season
Goalkeeper	(Ghana) Lawrence Ati-Zigi (St. Gallen)			
Defenders	(Croatia) Matej Maglica (St. Gallen)	(Switzerland) Marco Burch (Luzern)	(Switzerland) Michael Lang (Basel)	(Czech Republic) Martin Frýdek (Luzern)
Midfielders	(Switzerland) Fabian Rieder (Young Boys)	(Germany) Max Meyer (Luzern)	(Germany) Patrick Pflücke (Servette)	(Switzerland) Christian Fassnacht (Young Boys)
Forwards	(Switzerland) Zeki Amdouni (Basel)		(Switzerland) Cedric Itten (Young Boys)	
Manager	(Liechtenstein) Mario Frick (Luzern)			

=== Teams ===
==== Attendance ====
#	Club	Avg	Total
1	Young Boys	29,097	523,751
2	Basel	21,742	391,354
3	St. Gallen	17,575	316,356
4	Zürich	15,387	276,968
5	Luzern	12,775	229,945
6	Servette	8,431	151,762
7	Sion	8,375	150,750
8	Winterthur	8,228	148,100
9	Grasshopper	6,753	121,560
10	Lugano	3,353	60,355
Totals		13,172	2,370,901

Last updated: 30 May 2023
Source: Zuschauerzahlen 2022/23

==== Fair Play ====
On 14 June 2023, Servette FC was awarded the Fair Play Trophy for the Credit Suisse Super League.

#	Club	Booking (1 pt)	Second booking (3 pts)	Straight Red (5 pts)	Pts
1	Servette	73	2	2	89
2	Young Boys	74	2	3	95
3	Winterthur	94	0	2	104
4	Grasshopper	90	2	2	106
5	Lugano	94	4	1	111
6	Basel	89	2	6	125
7	St. Gallen	90	3	6	129
8	Luzern	91	7	4	132
9	Zürich	106	2	5	137
10	Sion	106	3	5	140
League Total		907	27	36	1168
Average/game		5.04	0.15	0.2	6.49

Last updated: 30 May 2023
Source: Fair Play Trophy Credit Suisse Super League
