= 2022–23 Swiss Challenge League =

Swiss Challenge League
- Season: 2022–23
- Dates: 15 July 2022 – 27 May 2023
- Champions: Yverdon-Sport
- Promoted: Yverdon-Sport; Lausanne-Sport; Stade Lausanne Ouchy
- Europa Conference League: Vaduz
- Matches: 180
- Goals: 562 (3.12 per match)
- Top goalscorer: 19 goals Brighton Labeau (LAU); Teddy Okou (SLO)
- Biggest home win: 6–0; SLO–BEL (27 May 23)
- Biggest away win: 1–6; BEL–VAD (16 Apr 23); XAM–VAD (27 May 23)
- Highest scoring: 7 goals 7 games
- Longest winning run: 4 games Aarau; Lausanne-Ouchy; Yverdon-Sport
- Longest unbeaten run: 11 games Lausanne-Sport
- Longest winless run: 13 games Bellinzona
- Longest losing run: 7 games Xamax
- Highest attendance: 12,034; Lausanne-Sport
- Total attendance: 420,547
- Average attendance: 2,336
- All statistics correct as of complete.

The 2022–23 Swiss Challenge League (referred to as the Dieci Challenge League for sponsoring reasons) is the 125th season of the second tier of competitive football in Switzerland and the 20th season under its current name.

== Overview ==
Ten teams will compete in the league: eight teams of the previous season will participate in the league again. They are joined by FC Lausanne-Sport, the last-placed team of the 2021–22 Swiss Super League, who replace previous season's champions FC Winterthur. Last season's last-placed team SC Kriens were relegated and are replaced by AC Bellinzona, who were promoted from the 2021-22 Swiss Promotion League. FC Schaffhausen, the losers of the 2021-22 relegation/promotion playoff, rejoined the league.

Due to the format change and increased number of teams in the 2023–24 Swiss Super League, this season will function as a transition season. As a result, the top two teams will be directly promoted and no teams will be relegated at the end of the season. Furthermore, the third-placed team will play a promotion playoff against the last placed team of the 2022–23 Swiss Super League, so a total of three teams may gain promotion to the Super League. Two teams of the 2022–23 Swiss Promotion League will be promoted and the third will play a relegation playoff with the last-placed Challenge League team.

=== Schedule ===
The schedule was announced on 17 June 2022. The first matchday will start on Friday 15 July 2022.

Unlike the Super League, the Challenge League will not start the winter break early due to the 2022 FIFA World Cup, which will be held in November and December 2022. As such, the 18th matchday will clash with matches of the World Cup. Restart of the league after the winter break will begin on 27 January 2023 and the season will conclude on the 27 May 2023. Following the end of the season, the two legs of the Relegation Play-off will be played on 31 May and 3 June 2023, respectively. The Promotion Play-off is scheduled for 3 and 6 June 2023, respectively.

== Participating teams ==
=== Stadia and locations ===
Locations of clubs in the 2022–23 Challenge League

Team	Location	Stadium	Capacity	Ref
FC Aarau	Aarau	Stadion Brügglifeld	8,000	
AC Bellinzona	Bellinzona	Stadio Comunale	5,000	
FC Stade Lausanne-Ouchy	Lausanne	Stade Olympique de la Pontaise (Note: Stade-Lausanne-Ouchy's home stadium Stade Juan-Antonio-Samaranch in Lausanne can not accommodate SLO for the Challenge League. SLO will play at the Stade Olympique de la Pontaise in Lausanne.)	15,850	
FC Lausanne-Sport	Lausanne	Stade de la Tuilière	12,544	
Neuchâtel Xamax FCS	Neuchâtel	Stade de la Maladière	11,997	
FC Schaffhausen	Schaffhausen	Wefox Arena	8,200	
FC Thun	Thun	Stadion Ralf Wirtz	10,014	
FC Vaduz	(Liechtenstein) Vaduz	Rheinpark Stadion	7,584	
FC Wil 1900	Wil	Stadion Bergholz	6,958	
Yverdon-Sport FC	Yverdon-les-Bains	Stade Municipal	6,600	

=== Personnel and kits ===
Team	Manager	Captain	Kit manufacturer	Shirt sponsor
Aarau	(Switzerland) Boris Smiljanić	(Albania) Shkëlzen Gashi	gpard	Credit Suisse
Bellinzona	(Italy) Stefano Maccoppi	(Switzerland) Dragan Mihajlović	Acerbis	
Lausanne-Ouchy	(France) Anthony Braizat	(Kosovo) Lavdrim Hajrulahu	14fourteen	gerofinance
Lausanne-Sport	(Switzerland) Ludovic Magnin	(Switzerland) Stjepan Kukuruzović	Le coq sportif	Banque cantonale vaudoise
Xamax	(Switzerland) Uli Forte	(Switzerland) Liridon Berisha	Puma	groupe e
Schaffhausen	(Switzerland) Selcuk Sasivari	(Switzerland) Serge Müller	Puma	Methabau
Thun	(Switzerland) Mauro Lustrinelli	(Switzerland) Marco Bürki	Macron	Schneider Software AG
Vaduz	(Liechtenstein) Martin Stocklasa	(Liechtenstein) Benjamin Büchel	Puma	MBPI
Wil	(Italy) Brunello Iacopetta	(Switzerland) Philipp Muntwiler	ERIMA	Weber und Partner AG; LIKA Group AG
Yverdon-Sport	(Switzerland) Marco Schällibaum	(France) William Le Pogam	Puma	Orllati SA

=== Managerial changes ===
Team	Outgoing manager	Manner of departure	Date of departure	Position in table	Incoming manager	Date of appointment	Ref.
Thun	(Argentina) Carlos Bernegger	Termination	21 May 2022	Pre-season	(Switzerland) Mauro Lustrinelli	16 June 2022	
Lausanne-Sport	(France) Alain Casanova	Termination	22 May 2022	Pre-season	(Switzerland) Ludovic Magnin	23 May 2022	
Yverdon-Sport	(Switzerland) Uli Forte	Departure	4 June 2022	Pre-season	(Switzerland) Marco Schällibaum	13 June 2022	
Schaffhausen	(Switzerland) Martin Andermatt	Contract Expiry	4 June 2022	Pre-season	(Switzerland) Hakan Yakin	4 June 2022	
Bellinzona	(Switzerland) Marco Schällibaum	Departure	13 June 2022	Pre-season	(Switzerland) David Sesa	21 June 2022	
Schaffhausen	(Switzerland) Hakan Yakin	Missing coaching licence	12 August 2022	6th	(Switzerland) Bigi Meier (interim)	12 August 2022	
Bellinzona	(Switzerland) David Sesa	Resignation	22 August 2022	7th	(Argentina) Fernando Cocimano (interim)	22 August 2022	
Xamax	(Switzerland) Andrea Binotto	Termination	28 August 2022	10th	(Luxembourg) Jeff Saibene	29 August 2022	
Schaffhausen	(Switzerland) Bigi Meier (interim)	End of interim period	2 September 2022	4th	(Switzerland) Hakan Yakin	12 August 2022	
Bellinzona	(Argentina) Fernando Cocimano (interim)	End of interim period	14 September 2022	5th	(Italy) Baldassare Raineri	14 September 2022	
Aarau	(Switzerland) Stephan Keller	Termination	1 November 2022	6th	(Switzerland) Boris Smiljanić	3 November 2022	
Vaduz	(Switzerland) Alessandro Mangiarratti	Resignation	16 November 2022	8th	(Germany) Jürgen Seeberger	15 December 2022	
Bellinzona	(Italy) Baldassare Raineri	Termination	18 January 2023	6th	(Italy) Stefano Maccoppi	19 January 2023	
Vaduz	(Germany) Jürgen Seeberger	Resignation	21 February 2023	9th	(Germany) Jan Mayer (interim)	21 February 2023	
Vaduz	(Germany) Jan Mayer (interim)	End of interim period	1 March 2023	9th	(Liechtenstein) Martin Stocklasa	1 March 2023	
Bellinzona	(Italy) Stefano Maccoppi	Termination	31 March 2023	8th	(Argentina) Fernando Cocimano (interim)	31 March 2023	
Xamax	(Luxembourg) Jeff Saibene	Resignation	23 April 2023	10th	(Switzerland) Uli Forte	25 April 2023	
Schaffhausen	(Switzerland) Hakan Yakin	Termination	20 May 2023	7th	(Switzerland) Selcuk Sasivari (interim)	20 May 2023	

== League table ==
Pos	Team	Pld	W	D	L	GF	GA	GD	Pts	Promotion or qualification
1	Yverdon (C, P)	36	20	6	10	64	53	+11	66	Promotion to Swiss Super League
2	Lausanne (P)	36	17	10	9	58	43	+15	61	Promotion to Swiss Super League
3	Lausanne-Ouchy (Note: Lausanne-Ouchy were deducted 3 points on 1 November 2022, due to license violations. This decision was overturned following the team's appeal on 22 November 2022.) (O, P)	36	17	9	10	70	53	+17	60	Qualification for the promotion play-off
4	Aarau	36	15	12	9	63	57	+6	57	
5	Wil	36	16	8	12	62	52	+10	56	
6	Thun	36	12	13	11	62	55	+7	49	
7	Schaffhausen	36	12	8	16	51	59	−8	44	
8	Vaduz	36	7	16	13	54	56	−2	37	Qualification for the Europa Conference League first qualifying round (Note: Vaduz qualified for the Europa Conference League first qualifying round by winning the 2022–23 Liechtenstein Cup.)
9	Bellinzona	36	11	4	21	38	71	−33	37	
10	Xamax (O)	36	4	12	20	42	65	−23	24	Qualification for the relegation play-off

Source: Swiss Challenge League
Rules for classification: 1) Points; 2) Goal difference; 3) Goals scored; 4) Head-to-head goal difference; 5) Away goals scored; 6) Draw.
(C) Champions; (O) Play-off winners; (P) Promoted

== Results ==
=== First and second rounds ===
Home \ Away	AAR	BEL	SLO	LAU	SHA	THU	VAD	WIL	XAM	YVE
Aarau	—	0–1	3–3	1–2	1–0	2–2	1–1	2–1	3–3	3–2
Bellinzona	0–4	—	1–4	1–0	1–3	1–3	2–0	5–1	3–1	1–2
Lausanne-Ouchy	2–1	2–1	—	2–1	0–2	2–2	1–5	2–1	2–1	5–0
Lausanne	2–2	1–1	0–0	—	5–1	2–1	3–1	4–0	2–1	3–2
Schaffhausen	0–2	1–0	0–2	0–0	—	1–0	2–2	0–1	2–0	1–2
Thun	2–2	1–1	0–2	2–0	2–1	—	1–1	1–3	2–1	1–3
Vaduz	4–0	2–3	0–2	1–0	1–1	2–4	—	0–0	1–1	3–3
Wil	6–1	5–1	0–0	1–0	4–3	1–1	2–0	—	2–0	4–0
Xamax	1–2	4–0	2–1	0–1	1–1	2–2	1–1	1–1	—	2–3
Yverdon	2–2	0–1	2–1	4–0	3–0	3–1	3–1	1–3	3–1	—

Source: Swiss Challenge League (in German)
Legend: Blue = home team win; Yellow = draw; Red = away team win.

=== Third and fourth rounds ===
Home \ Away	AAR	BEL	SLO	LAU	SHA	THU	VAD	WIL	XAM	YVE
Aarau	—	2–0	2–3	2–2	2–0	1–0	0–2	0–0	5–2	1–2
Bellinzona	0–1	—	0–1	1–0	0–2	3–0	1–6	3–2	1–1	0–2
Lausanne-Ouchy	3–4	6–0	—	2–4	0–4	2–2	0–0	3–4	2–0	4–1
Lausanne	4–1	1–1	2–1	—	1–1	1–3	0–0	2–0	2–1	2–0
Schaffhausen	2–2	2–1	2–4	1–2	—	0–5	1–0	4–1	1–1	3–4
Thun	2–3	2–0	1–1	3–3	2–3	—	3–3	1–1	1–0	3–1
Vaduz	0–1	2–1	2–2	1–1	1–4	0–3	—	2–2	1–2	0–0
Wil	0–3	3–0	1–2	1–2	3–1	1–2	2–0	—	3–2	0–2
Xamax	0–0	3–0	1–1	2–3	1–1	1–1	1–6	0–1	—	1–2
Yverdon	1–1	1–2	1–0	1–0	2–0	1–0	2–2	1–1	2–0	—

Source: Swiss Challenge League (in German)
Legend: Blue = home team win; Yellow = draw; Red = away team win.

== Play-offs ==
=== Promotion play-off ===
The relegation play-off will be played in a two-legged game between the last place team of the Super League and the third placed team of the Challenge League. The first leg will be held on 3 June 2023, with the representative of the Super League hosting. The second leg will be held on 6 June 2023.

==== First leg ====
3 June 2023
18:00 CEST (UTC+2)

Sion	0–2	Lausanne-Ouchy
	Report	26' Mulaj; 57' Bamba

Stade Tourbillon, Sion
Attendance: 9,050
Referee: Luca Cibelli

==== Second leg ====
6 June 2023
20:30 CEST (UTC+2)

Lausanne-Ouchy	4–2	Sion
Mulaj 6', 89'; Ajdini 34'; Okou 81'	Report	23' Zuffi; 39' (pen.) Grgic

Stade Olympique de la Pontaise, Lausanne
Attendance: 10,754
Referee: Urs Schnyder

Lausanne-Ouchy wins 6–2 on aggregate.

=== Relegation play-off ===
The relegation/promotion play-off will be played in a two-legged game between the last placed team of the Challenge League and the third placed team of the Promotion League. The first leg will be held on 31 May 2023, with the representative of the Promotion League hosting. The second leg will be held on 3 June 2023.

==== First leg ====
31 May 2023
19:30 CEST (UTC+2)

Rapperswil-Jona	1–3	Xamax
Volkart 54'	Report	7' Aliu; 20' Bakayoko; 26' Del Toro

Stadium Grünfeld, Rapperswil
Attendance: 2,154

==== Second leg ====
3 June 2023
19:00 CEST (UTC+2)

Xamax	3–0	Rapperswil-Jona
Hammerich 58'; Del Toro 69'; Pinga 73'	Report

Stade de la Maladière, Neuchâtel
Attendance: 6,414

Xamax wins 6–1 on aggregate

== Statistics ==
=== Top Scorers ===
As of 27 May 2023

Rank	Player	Club	Goals
1	(France) Brighton Labeau	Lausanne	19
1	(France) Teddy Okou	Lausanne-Ouchy	19
3	(Germany) Gabriel Kyeremateng	Thun	16
4	(Kosovo) Shkelqim Vladi	Aarau	15
5	(Switzerland) Valon Fazliu	Aarau	14
6	(Kosovo) Alban Ajdini	Lausanne-Ouchy	13
7	(Switzerland) Tunahan Cicek	Vaduz	12
7	(Ivory Coast) Koro Kone	Yverdon	12
7	(France) Brian Beyer	Yverdon	12
10	(Argentina) Raúl Bobadilla	Schaffhausen	11
10	(Switzerland) Nicolas Muci	Wil	11

=== Assists ===
As of 27 May 2023

Rank	Player	Club	Assists
1	(Switzerland) Valon Fazliu	Aarau	14
2	(Switzerland) Mergim Qarri	Lausanne-Ouchy	11
3	(Switzerland) Dominik Schwizer	Lausanne	9
3	(Switzerland) Kastrijot Ndau	Wil	9
5	(North Macedonia) Nikola Gjorgjev	Aarau	8
5	(Uruguay) Cristian Souza	Bellinzona	8
5	(Switzerland) Josias Lukembila	Wil	8
5	(France) Teddy Okou	Lausanne-Ouchy	8

== Awards ==
=== Best Player ===
==== Player of the Round ====
The best player of the Super League and Challenge League for each matchday is voted for by the viewers from among a selection of players.

Round 1						Round 2						Round 3						Round 4					
#	Nat	Player	Team	L	Ref	#	Nat	Player	Team	L	Ref	#	Nat	Player	Team	L	Ref	#	Nat	Player	Team	L	Ref
1	(Serbia)	Samir Ramizi	Winterthur	(SL)		10	(Switzerland)	Cedric Itten	Young Boys	(SL)		19	(Portugal)	André Moreira	Grasshopper	(SL)		28	(Germany)	Pius Dorn	Luzern	(SL)	
2	(Japan)	Hayao Kawabe	Grasshopper	(SL)		11	(Italy)	Mario Balotelli	Sion	(SL)		20	(France)	Andy Diouf	Basel	(SL)							
3	(Azerbaijan)	Renat Dadashov	Grasshopper	(SL)		12	(Tunisia)	Mohamed Dräger	Luzern	(SL)		21	(Switzerland)	Zeki Amdouni	Basel	(SL)							
4	(Switzerland)	Nicky Beloko	Luzern	(SL)		13	(Germany)	Max Meyer	Luzern	(SL)		22	(Czech Republic)	Martin Frýdek	Luzern	(SL)							
5	(Germany)	Lukas Görtler	St. Gallen	(SL)		14	(Switzerland)	Dejan Sorgić	Luzern	(SL)		23	(Ghana)	Lawrence Ati-Zigi	St. Gallen	(SL)							
6	(Germany)	Lukas Watkowiak	St. Gallen	(SL)		15	(Ghana)	Lawrence Ati-Zigi	St. Gallen	(SL)		24	(Switzerland)	Nicky Beloko	Luzern	(SL)							
7	(Mali)	Daouda Guindo	St. Gallen	(SL)		16	(Ivory Coast)	Emmanuel Latte Lath	St. Gallen	(SL)		25	(Switzerland)	Noe Holenstein	Winterthur	(SL)							
8	(Switzerland)	Ardon Jashari	Luzern	(SL)		17	(Switzerland)	Pascal Schürpf	Luzern	(SL)		26	(Germany)	Meritan Shabani	Grasshopper	(SL)							
9	(Germany)	Marius Müller	Luzern	(SL)		18	(Germany)	Max Meyer	Luzern	(SL)		27	(France)	Sofyan Chader	Luzern	(SL)							

==== Player of the Month ====
The best player of the month in the Super League and Challenge League is chosen by the viewers from among five nominees. The following table shows the winner (in dark grey) and the other nominees for each month where a Player of the Month was chosen.

July				August				September			
Nat	Player	Team	L	Nat	Player	Team	L	Nat	Player	Team	L
(Switzerland)	Jérémy Frick	Servette	(SL)	(Azerbaijan)	Renat Dadashov	Grasshopper	(SL)	(Switzerland)	Ardon Jashari	Luzern	(SL)
(France)	Wilfried Kanga	Young Boys	(SL)	(Germany)	Lukas Görtler	St. Gallen	(SL)	(France)	Timothé Cognat	Servette	(SL)
(Switzerland)	Basil Stillhart	St. Gallen	(SL)	(Switzerland)	Cedric Itten	Young Boys	(SL)	(Switzerland)	Valon Fazliu	Aarau	(ChL)
(Guadeloupe)	Nathanaël Saintini	Sion	(SL)	(Ivory Coast)	Koro Kone	Yverdon	(ChL)	(Netherlands)	Wouter Burger	Basel	(SL)
(Ivory Coast)	Koro Kone	Yverdon	(ChL)	(Kosovo)	Shkelqim Vladi	Aarau	(ChL)	(Switzerland)	Filip Stojilković	Sion	(SL)
October				November				February			
(Germany)	Max Meyer	Luzern	(SL)	(Ghana)	Lawrence Ati-Zigi	St. Gallen	(SL)	(Switzerland)	Zeki Amdouni	Basel	(SL)
(France)	David Douline	Servette	(SL)	(Nigeria)	Tosin Aiyegun	Zürich	(SL)	(Ivory Coast)	Chris Bedia	Servette	(SL)
(Democratic Republic of the Congo)	Timothy Fayulu	Winterthur	(SL)	(Switzerland)	Renato Steffen	Lugano	(SL)	(Nigeria)	Tosin Aiyegun	Zürich	(SL)
(Switzerland)	Fabian Rieder	Young Boys	(SL)	(France)	Teddy Okou	Lausanne-Ouchy	(ChL)	(Italy)	Francesco Ruberto	Schaffhausen	(ChL)
(Switzerland)	Anthony Sauthier	Lausanne-Ouchy	(ChL)	(Switzerland)	Marvin Keller	Wil	(ChL)	(Martinique)	Brighton Labeau	Lausanne-Sport	(ChL)
March				April				May			
(Switzerland)	Cedric Itten	Young Boys	(SL)	(Czech Republic)	Martin Frýdek	Luzern	(SL)	(Switzerland)	Miroslav Stevanovic	Servette	(SL)
(Switzerland)	Zeki Amdouni	Basel	(SL)	(Switzerland)	Cedric Itten	Young Boys	(SL)	(Ivory Coast)	Emmanuel Latte Lath	St. Gallen	(SL)
(Nigeria)	Tosin Aiyegun	Zürich	(SL)	(Switzerland)	Renato Steffen	Lugano	(SL)	(Czech Republic)	Roman Macek	Lugano	(SL)
(Japan)	Ayumu Seko	Grasshopper	(SL)	(Switzerland)	Valon Fazliu	Aarau	(ChL)	(Cameroon)	Jean-Pierre Nsame	Young Boys	(SL)
(Germany)	Gabriel Kyeremateng	Thun	(ChL)	(Switzerland)	Nikolas Muci	Wil	(ChL)	(Switzerland)	Liridon Mulaj	Lausanne-Ouchy	(ChL)

==== Overall ====
First Half of the Season
Nat	Player	Team	L
(Ghana)	Lawrence Ati-Zigi	St. Gallen	(SL)
(Switzerland)	Cedric Itten	Young Boys	(SL)
(France)	David Douline	Servette	(SL)
(Ivory Coast)	Koro Kone	Yverdon	(ChL)
(Switzerland)	Valon Fazliu	Aarau	(ChL)

=== Teams ===
==== Fair Play ====
On 14 June 2023, FC Vaduz was awarded the Fair Play Trophy for the dieci Challenge League.

#	Club	Booking (1 pt)	Second booking (3 pts)	Straight Red (5 pts)	Pts
1	Vaduz	82	1	1	90
2	Yverdon	92	1	0	95
3	Aarau	88	2	1	99
4	Wil	82	3	3	106
5	Schaffhausen	93	5	0	108
6	Thun	101	1	1	109
7	Bellinzona	104	4	1	121
8	Lausanne	90	6	3	123
9	Xamax	100	4	3	127
10	Lausanne-Ouchy	121	3	3	145
League Total		953	30	16	1123
Average/game		5.29	0.17	0.09	6.24

Last updated: 30 May 2023
Source: Fair Play Trophy dieci Challenge League
