= 2022–23 FC Stade Lausanne Ouchy season =

FC Stade Lausanne Ouchy
2022–23 season
- Chairman: Vartan Sirmakes
- Manager: Anthony Braizat
- Stadium: Stade Olympique de la Pontaise
- Swiss Challenge League: 3rd (promoted via play-offs)
- Swiss Cup: Round 2
- Top goalscorer: League: Teddy Okou (19); All: Teddy Okou (21)

The 2022–23 season was FC Stade Lausanne Ouchy's 122nd season in existence and the club's fourth consecutive season in the top flight of Swiss football. In addition to the domestic league, Stade Lausanne Ouchy participated in this season's edition of the Swiss Cup. The season covered the period from 1 July 2022 to 30 June 2023.

== Players ==
=== First-team squad ===
Note: Flags indicate national team as defined under FIFA eligibility rules; some limited exceptions apply. Players may hold more than one non-FIFA nationality.

No.	Pos.	Nation	Player
1	GK	SUI	Dany da Silva
4	DF	SUI	Lucas Pos
5	DF	KOS	Lavdrim Hajrulahu
6	MF	ANG	Giovani Bamba
8	MF	FRA	Romain Bayard
9	FW	FRA	Zachary Hadji
10	MF	KOS	Mergim Qarri
11	MF	FRA	Teddy Okou
12	FW	SUI	Yvan Alounga (on loan from Luzern)
17	MF	KOS	Alban Ajdini
18	MF	SUI	Liridon Mulaj
19	GK	SUI	Niklas Steffen

No.	Pos.	Nation	Player
20	FW	SUI	Nathan Garcia
21	DF	SUI	Linus Obexer
22	DF	SUI	Marc Tsoungui
23	DF	FRA	Rayan Kadima
24	MF	CIV	Edmond Akichi
26	MF	SUI	Theophilious Opoku-Mensah
27	DF	SEN	Lamine Gassama
29	DF	COM	Abdallah Ali Mohamed
30	GK	SUI	Tristan Zesiger
31	FW	FRA	Florian Danho
33	DF	KOS	Rejan Thaçi
34	MF	IRI	Shaho Maroufi

=== Out on loan ===
Note: Flags indicate national team as defined under FIFA eligibility rules; some limited exceptions apply. Players may hold more than one non-FIFA nationality.

No.	Pos.	Nation	Player
—	MF	BRA	Carlos Lima (at Echallens until 30 June 2023)

== Pre-season and friendlies ==
Win Draw Loss

29 June 2022 Friendly	Stade Lausanne-Ouchy (Switzerland)	1–2	(Switzerland) Servette	Lausanne
17:30 CEST (UTC+2)		Report		Stadium: Stade Juan-Antonio Samaranch

1 July 2022 Friendly	Young Boys (Switzerland)	2–2	(Switzerland) Stade Lausanne-Ouchy	Gstaad, Switzerland
17:00 CEST (UTC+2)	Monteiro 10'; Fassnacht 88'		Hadji 12'; Alounga 69'	Stadium: Sportplatz Schützebode

2 July 2022 Friendly	Thun (Switzerland)	2–1	(Switzerland) Stade Lausanne-Ouchy	Gstaad, Switzerland
16:30 CEST (UTC+2)				Stadium: Sportplatz Schützebode

9 July 2022 Friendly	Stade Lausanne-Ouchy (Switzerland)	7–0	(Switzerland) Étoile Carouge	Nyon
17:00 CEST (UTC+2)				Stadium: Colovray Sports Centre

11 January 2023 Friendly	Stade Lausanne-Ouchy (Switzerland)	2–2	(Switzerland) Neuchâtel Xamax	Lausanne
11:00 CET (UTC+1)				Stadium: Stade de la Tuilière

== Competitions ==
=== Overview ===
Competition	First match	Last match	Starting round	Final position	Record							
Competition	First match	Last match	Starting round	Final position	Pld	W	D	L	GF	GA	GD	Win %
Swiss Challenge League	15 July 2022	27 May 2023	Matchday 1	3rd	36	17	9	10	70	53	+17	47.22
Promotion play-off	3 June 2023	6 June 2023	First leg	Winners	1	1	0	0	6	2	+4	100.00
Swiss Cup	20 August 2022	17 September 2022	Round 1	Round 2	2	1	0	1	5	3	+2	50.00
Total					39	19	9	11	81	58	+23	48.72

Source: Soccerway

=== Swiss Challenge League ===
==== League table ====
Pos	Team	Pld	W	D	L	GF	GA	GD	Pts	Promotion or qualification
1	Yverdon (C, P)	36	20	6	10	64	53	+11	66	Promotion to Swiss Super League
2	Lausanne (P)	36	17	10	9	58	43	+15	61	Promotion to Swiss Super League
3	Lausanne-Ouchy (Note: Lausanne-Ouchy were deducted 3 points on 1 November 2022, due to license violations. This decision was overturned following the team's appeal on 22 November 2022.) (O, P)	36	17	9	10	70	53	+17	60	Qualification for the promotion play-off
4	Aarau	36	15	12	9	63	57	+6	57	
5	Wil	36	16	8	12	62	52	+10	56	

Source: Swiss Challenge League
Rules for classification: 1) Points; 2) Goal difference; 3) Goals scored; 4) Head-to-head goal difference; 5) Away goals scored; 6) Draw.
(C) Champions; (O) Play-off winners; (P) Promoted

==== Results summary ====
Overall								Home						Away					
Pld	W	D	L	GF	GA	GD	Pts	W	D	L	GF	GA	GD	W	D	L	GF	GA	GD
36	17	9	10	70	53	+17	60	9	3	6	40	33	+7	8	6	4	30	20	+10

==== Results by round ====
Round	1	2	3	4	5	6	7	8	9	10	11	12	13	14	15	16	17	18	19	20	21	22	23	24	25	26	27	28	29	30	31	32	33	34	35	36
Ground	A	H	A	A	H	A	H	H	A	H	A	H	A	H	H	A	H	A	H	A	H	A	H	A	A	H	A	H	A	H	A	H	A	H	A	H
Result	L	W	W	D	L	D	W	D	W	W	W	L	W	W	W	L	W	D	L	L	L	D	L	W	W	D	D	L	L	D	W	W	W	W	D	W
Position																																				

A = Away; H = Home; W = Win; D = Draw; L = Loss

==== Matches ====
15 July 2022 1	Yverdon	2–1	Stade Lausanne-Ouchy

23 July 2022 2	Stade Lausanne-Ouchy	2–1	Wil	Lausanne
				Stadium: Stade Olympique de la Pontaise

30 July 2022 3	Bellinzona	1–4	Stade Lausanne-Ouchy

7 August 2022 4	Lausanne	0–0	Stade Lausanne-Ouchy

13 August 2022 5	Stade Lausanne-Ouchy	0–2	Schaffhausen	Lausanne
				Stadium: Stade Olympique de la Pontaise

27 August 2022 6	Aarau	3–3	Stade Lausanne-Ouchy

3 September 2022 7	Stade Lausanne-Ouchy	2–1	Neuchâtel Xamax	Lausanne
				Stadium: Stade Olympique de la Pontaise

10 September 2022 8	Stade Lausanne-Ouchy	2–2	Thun	Lausanne
				Stadium: Stade Olympique de la Pontaise

2 October 2022 9	Vaduz	0–2	Stade Lausanne-Ouchy

8 October 2022 10	Stade Lausanne-Ouchy	2–1	Lausanne	Lausanne
				Stadium: Stade Olympique de la Pontaise

14 October 2022 11	Thun	0–2	Stade Lausanne-Ouchy	Thun

19 October 2022 12	Stade Lausanne-Ouchy	1–5	Vaduz	Lausanne
				Stadium: Stade Olympique de la Pontaise

22 October 2022 13	Schaffhausen	0–2	Stade Lausanne-Ouchy	Schaffhausen

28 October 2022 14	Stade Lausanne-Ouchy	2–1	Aarau	Lausanne
				Stadium: Stade Olympique de la Pontaise

5 November 2022 15	Stade Lausanne-Ouchy	2–1	Bellinzona	Lausanne
				Stadium: Stade Olympique de la Pontaise

11 November 2022 16	Neuchâtel Xamax	2–1	Stade Lausanne-Ouchy	Neuchâtel

19 November 2022 17	Stade Lausanne-Ouchy	5–0	Yverdon	Lausanne
				Stadium: Stade Olympique de la Pontaise

26 November 2022 18	Wil	0–0	Stade Lausanne-Ouchy	Wil

29 January 2023 19	Stade Lausanne-Ouchy	2–4	Lausanne	Lausanne
				Stadium: Stade Olympique de la Pontaise

3 February 2023 20	Yverdon	1–0	Stade Lausanne-Ouchy	Yverdon

12 February 2023 21	Stade Lausanne-Ouchy	3–4	Wil	Lausanne
				Stadium: Stade Olympique de la Pontaise

17 February 2023 22	Thun	1–1	Stade Lausanne-Ouchy	Thun

26 February 2023 23	Stade Lausanne-Ouchy	0–4	Schaffhausen	Lausanne
				Stadium: Stade Olympique de la Pontaise

5 March 2023 24	Bellinzona	0–1	Stade Lausanne-Ouchy	Bellinzona

11 March 2023 25	Aarau	2–3	Stade Lausanne-Ouchy	Aarau

18 March 2023 26	Stade Lausanne-Ouchy	0–0	Vaduz	Lausanne
				Stadium: Stade Olympique de la Pontaise

2 April 2023 27	Neuchâtel Xamax	1–1	Stade Lausanne-Ouchy	Neuchâtel

8 April 2023 28	Stade Lausanne-Ouchy	3–4	Aarau	Lausanne
				Stadium: Stade Olympique de la Pontaise

16 April 2023 29	Lausanne	2–1	Stade Lausanne-Ouchy	Lausanne

22 April 2023 30	Stade Lausanne-Ouchy	2–2	Thun	Lausanne
				Stadium: Stade Olympique de la Pontaise

28 April 2023 31	Wil	1–2	Stade Lausanne-Ouchy	Wil

5 May 2023 32	Stade Lausanne-Ouchy	2–0	Neuchâtel Xamax	Lausanne
				Stadium: Stade Olympique de la Pontaise

12 May 2023 33	Schaffhausen	2–4	Stade Lausanne-Ouchy	Schaffhausen

19 May 2023 34	Stade Lausanne-Ouchy	4–1	Yverdon	Lausanne
				Stadium: Stade Olympique de la Pontaise

23 May 2023 35	Vaduz	2–2	Stade Lausanne-Ouchy	Vaduz

27 May 2023 36	Stade Lausanne-Ouchy	6–0	Bellinzona	Lausanne
				Stadium: Stade Olympique de la Pontaise

=== Swiss Cup ===
20 August 2022 Round 1	CS Italien GE	2–5	Stade Lausanne-Ouchy	Petit-Lancy
20:00 CEST (UTC+2)		Report		Stadium: Stade du Bois-de-la-Bâtie

17 September 2022 Round 2	Stade Lausanne-Ouchy	0–1	Young Boys	Lausanne
18:30 CEST (UTC+1)		Report	66' Itten; (yellow card) 44' (yellow-red card) 82' Rüegg	Stadium: Stade olympique de la Pontaise
