= Abdallah Ali Mohamed =

Comorian footballer (born 1999)

Personal information
- Date of birth: 11 April 1999 (age 27)
- Place of birth: Moroni, Comoros
- Height: 1.78 m (5 ft 10 in)
- Position: Right-back

Team information
- Current team: Velež Mostar
- Number: 5

Youth career
- 2014–2020: Marseille

Senior career*
Years	Team	Apps	(Gls)
2017–2021	Marseille B	73	(4)
2020–2021	Marseille	0	(0)
2020–2021	→ Zulte Waregem (loan)	0	(0)
2021–2024	Lausanne Ouchy	70	(1)
2025	Istres	3	(0)
2025–2026	Aubagne Air Bel	28	(0)
2026–	Velež Mostar	6	(0)

International career
2017–2024	Comoros	22	(1)
- * Club domestic league appearances and goals as of 19 September 2026

Abdallah Ali Mohamed, also known as Mohamed Abdallah (born 11 April 1999) is a Comorian professional footballer who plays as a right-back for Bosnian Premier League club Velež Mostar. Previously he also played for Comoros national team.

== Club career ==
Ali Mohamed was part of the Marseille youth academy from the age of 13.

On 3 July 2021, Ali Mohamed signed with Lausanne Ouchy in Switzerland.

On 12 July 2026, Ali Mohamed joined Velež Mostar in Bosnia and Herzegovina for two seasons.

== International career ==
Ali Mohamed debuted for the Comoros national team in a friendly 2–0 loss with Togo on 4 June 2017.

== Career statistics ==
=== Club ===
As of match played 19 September 2026

Appearances and goals by club, season and competition
Club	Season	League			National cup (Note: Includes Swiss Cup, Coupe de France, Bosnian Cup)		Other		Total	
Club	Season	Division	Apps	Goals	Apps	Goals	Apps	Goals	Apps	Goals
Marseille B	2016–17	Championnat National 2	13	0	—		—		13	0
Marseille B	2017–18	Championnat National 2	29	2	—		—		29	2
Marseille B	2018–19	Championnat National 2	22	2	—		—		22	2
Marseille B	2019–20	Championnat National 2	9	0	—		—		9	0
Marseille B	Total		73	4	—		—		73	4
Lausanne Ouchy	2021–22	Swiss Challenge League	20	1	1	0	—		21	1
Lausanne Ouchy	2022–23	Swiss Challenge League	24	0	1	0	2 (Note: Appearances in the 2022–23 Swiss Challenge League promotion play-off)	0	27	0
Lausanne Ouchy	2023–24	Swiss Super League	26	0	2	0	—		28	0
Lausanne Ouchy	Total		70	1	4	0	2	0	76	1
Istres	2024–25	Championnat National 2	3	0	—		—		3	0
Aubagne Air Bel	2025–26	Championnat National	28	0	2	0	—		30	0
Velež Mostar	2026–27	Bosnian Premier League	6	0	0	0	—		6	0
Career total			180	5	6	0	2	0	188	5

=== International ===
As of match played 25 March 2024

Appearances and goals by national team and year
National team	Year	Apps	Goals
Comoros	2017	2	0
Comoros	2018	6	0
Comoros	2019	3	0
Comoros	2020	0	0
Comoros	2021	1	0
Comoros	2022	5	1
Comoros	2023	4	0
Comoros	2024	1	0
Total		22	1

=== International goals ===
Scores and results list the Comoros' goal tally first.

No.	Date	Venue	Opponent	Score	Result	Competition
1.	25 March 2022	Stade de Moroni, Moroni, Comoros	Ethiopia	2–0	2–1	Friendly
