= 2023–24 Swiss Super League =

127th season of top-tier Swiss football

Swiss Super League
- Season: 2023–24
- Dates: 22 July 2023 – 25 May 2024
- Champions: Young Boys; 17th title
- Relegated: Lausanne Ouchy
- Champions League: Young Boys; Lugano
- Europa League: Servette
- Conference League: Zürich; St. Gallen
- Matches: 228 (198 + 15 + 15)
- Top goalscorer: Chadrac Akolo; Kevin Carlos; Žan Celar (14 goals each)
- Biggest home win: Lugano 6–1 Yverdon (13 August 2023); Young Boys 6–1 Luzern (11 November 2023); Grasshopper 5–0 Lausanne (2 December 2023)
- Biggest away win: Yverdon 0–5 Lugano (25 November 2023)
- Highest scoring: 7 goals 7 matches
- Longest winning run: Servette (7 wins)
- Longest unbeaten run: Servette (15 games)
- Longest winless run: Lausanne Ouchy (10 games)
- Longest losing run: Winterthur (6 losses)
- Highest attendance: 31,500
- Total attendance: 2,562,789
- Average attendance: 11,340

The 2023–24 Swiss Super League (referred to as the Credit Suisse Super League for sponsoring reasons) was the 127th season of top-tier competitive football in Switzerland and the 21st under its current name. It was the first season under its current name featuring twelve teams (increased from ten in previous season) and a new format. Young Boys were the defending champions.

== Overview ==
=== Format ===
Since rebranding and restructuring the National League A to the Super League, starting with the 2003–04 season, the league had been running under the same format and the same number of teams. This season was thus the first season of the Super League under a new format. It also returned to having twelve teams in the highest Swiss football tier.

The season was divided into two phases:

- In the first phase all twelve teams played each other three times each, for a total of 33 matchdays.
- Following that, the league was split into two groups of six each, one championship group and one relegation group.
  - Each team played every other team in their group one time (five matches each), for a total of 38 matchdays.
  - The championship group played for the title of Swiss Football Champion and qualification for European championships.
  - The relegation group played against relegation (last place) and qualification for the relegation play-off (second-to-last place).
- Points won in the first phase were carried over to the second phase.

=== Schedule ===
The Swiss Football League (SFL) released a detailed schedule on 7 December 2022. The season began on 22 July 2023 and concluded on 25 May 2024. The league paused for the winter break after matchday 18 on 17 December 2023, and resumed on 20 January 2024. The first phase concluded with matchday 33 on 21 April 2024, and the second phase started two weeks later, on 4 May 2024. The final matchday of the relegation group took place on 21 May 2024, while the championship group held its last matches on 25 May 2024. The two legs of the relegation play-offs were played on 26 and 31 May 2024, respectively.

The fixtures of the first 22 rounds were drawn and published on 21 June 2023, together with the match times for the first eleven rounds. Match times of rounds 12–22 were published on 8 September 2023. Fixtures and match times for the final eleven round of the regular season were published on 20 December 2023. The matches of the final matchday of the regular season were played concurrently on 21 April 2024.

Following the 32nd matchday, the participants of the Championship and Relegation Groups were decided. As a result, the fixtures for the final phase of the season were announced on 18 April 2024, before the final matchday of the regular season.

== Teams ==
=== Changes ===
Due to the increased number of teams, no teams were directly relegated at the end of the previous season and two teams were directly promoted from the Challenge League.

Challenge League champions Yverdon-Sport FC, and runners-up FC Lausanne-Sport achieved direct promotion. Stade Lausanne Ouchy beat FC Sion in the promotion/relegation play-off to replace them in the top league of Switzerland. Yverdon Sport had most recently played in the top flight in the 2005–06 season, while Lausanne Sport returned to the Super League after only one season in the second tier being relegated in the 2021–22 season and Lausanne Ouchy play in Super League for the first time in history from this season.

=== Stadia and locations ===
FC Basel	Grasshopper Club Zürich	FC Zürich	FC Stade Lausanne Ouchy	FC Lausanne-Sport
St. Jakob Park	Letzigrund		Stade Olympique (Note: Stade-Lausanne-Ouchy's home stadium Stade Juan-Antonio-Samaranch in Lausanne can not accommodate SLO for the Super League. SLO will play at the Stade Olympique de la Pontaise in Lausanne.)	Stade de la Tuilière
Basel	Zürich		Lausanne	Lausanne
Capacity: 37,994	Capacity: 26,103		Capacity: 15,850	Capacity: 12,544
FC Lugano	Location of the 2023–24 Swiss Super League teams			FC Luzern
Stadio Cornaredo	Location of the 2023–24 Swiss Super League teams			Swissporarena
Lugano	Location of the 2023–24 Swiss Super League teams			Luzern
Capacity: 6,390	Location of the 2023–24 Swiss Super League teams			Capacity: 16,490
Servette FC	FC St. Gallen	FC Winterthur	BSC Young Boys	Yverdon-Sport FC
Stade de Genève	Kybunpark	Stadion Schützenwiese	Stadion Wankdorf	Stade Municipal (Note: Yverdon-Sport played their home games at the Stade de la Maladière in Neuchâtel until the end of September 2023, when changes to make the Stade Municipal Super League ready are completed. They return to their regular home ground on 24 September 2023.)
Geneva	St. Gallen	Winterthur	Bern	Yverdon-les-Bains
Capacity: 28,833	Capacity: 19,455	Capacity: 8,400	Capacity: 31,120	Capacity: 6,600

No. of teams	Cantons	Team(s)
3
3	Vaud	Lausanne-Sport, Lausanne Ouchy, Yverdon
3	Zürich	Zürich, Grasshopper, FC Winterthur
1
1	Bern	Young Boys
1	Basel-Stadt	Basel
1	Lucerne	Luzern
1	St. Gallen	St. Gallen
1	Geneva	Servette
1	Ticino	Lugano

=== Personnel and kits ===
Team	President	Manager	Captain	Kit manufacturer	Shirt sponsor (front)*	Shirt sponsor (back)	Shirt sponsor (sleeve)	Shorts sponsor	Socks sponsor
Basel	(Switzerland) Reto Baumgartner	(Switzerland) Fabio Celestini	(Switzerland) Fabian Frei	Macron	Novartis	EuroAirport.	Bank CIC, hoffmann automobile	tectake, Feldschlösschen	None
Grasshopper	(United States) Stacy Johns	(Switzerland) Marco Schällibaum	(Albania) Amir Abrashi	Capelli Sport	Cabatech (in cup matches)	None	None	Feedy's	None
Lausanne Ouchy	(Armenia) Vartan Sirmakes	(Portugal) Ricardo Dionísio	(Kosovo) Lavdrim Hajrulahu	14fourteen	gerofinance	Berney Associés	None	Cronos Finance, Roduit	None
Lausanne Sport	(Netherlands) Leen Heemskerk	(Switzerland) Ludovic Magnin	(Switzerland) Olivier Custodio	Le Coq Sportif	Banque cantonale vaudoise	Ineos	Enzonet	None	None
Lugano	(Switzerland) Philippe Regazzoni	(Switzerland) Mattia Croci-Torti	(Uruguay) Jonathan Sabbatini	Erreà	AIL/Lugano’s Plan ₿ (in UEFA matches)	Lugano’s Plan ₿ (in cup matches)	HRS Real Estate/AIL (in UEFA matches)	GTL Impresa Costruzioni	None
Luzern	(Switzerland) Stefan Wolf	(Liechtenstein) Mario Frick	(Germany) Max Meyer	Craft	Otto’s	Luzerner Kantonalbank	mycasino	Maréchaux Elektro	Lehner Versand
Servette	(Switzerland) Didier Fischer	(Switzerland) René Weiler	(Switzerland) Jérémy Frick	Adidas	MSC Cruises	None	None	Berney Associés	None
St. Gallen	(Switzerland) Matthias Hüppi	(Germany) Peter Zeidler	(Germany) Lukas Görtler	Puma	St.Galler Kantonalbank	Mettler2Invest	Konzept Fenster & Türen, Schützengarten	Malbuner	None
Winterthur	(Switzerland) Mike Keller	(Switzerland) Patrick Rahmen	(Kosovo) Granit Lekaj	gpard	Keller Druckmesstechnik, Init7	Schiess Reinigungen	Ruckstuhl/Condecta (in cup matches), Mr. Green Recycling	Samen-Mauser, Göldi AG	None
Young Boys	(Switzerland) Hanspeter Kienberger	(Switzerland) Joël Magnin	(Switzerland) Fabian Lustenberger	Nike	Plus500	KPT Krankenkasse	Weiss+Appetito	AMAG, TimeTool/Komit (in cup matches)	None
Yverdon-Sport	(United States) Jeffrey Saunders	(Switzerland) Alessandro Mangiarratti	(France) William Le Pogam	Macron	MAGENTA EKO (H)	None	None	None	None
Zürich	(Switzerland) Ancillo Canepa	(Netherlands) Ricardo Moniz	(Switzerland) Yanick Brecher	Nike	NOKERA	None	None	None	None

* Institutional sponsor Credit Suisse features on the front of the shirt for all teams participating in the Super League.

=== Managerial changes ===
Team	Outgoing manager	Manner of departure	Date of departure	Position in table	Incoming manager	Date of appointment	Ref.
Grasshopper	(Switzerland) Giorgio Contini	Resigned	9 June 2023	Pre-season	(Switzerland) Bruno Berner	9 June 2023	
Winterthur	(Switzerland) Bruno Berner	Resigned	9 June 2023	Pre-season	(Switzerland) Patrick Rahmen	8 July 2023	
Basel	(Germany) Heiko Vogel (interim)	End of interim period	30 June 2023	Pre-season	(Germany) Timo Schultz	30 June 2023	
Servette	(Switzerland) Alain Geiger	End of Contract	30 June 2023	Pre-season	(Switzerland) René Weiler	30 June 2023	
Basel	(Germany) Timo Schultz	Termination	29 September 2023	9th	(Germany) Heiko Vogel	29 September 2023	
Yverdon-Sport	(Switzerland) Marco Schällibaum	Termination	30 October 2023	8th	(Switzerland) Alessandro Mangiarratti	31 October 2023	
Basel	(Germany) Heiko Vogel	Termination	31 October 2023	12th	(Switzerland) Fabio Celestini	31 October 2023	
Lausanne Ouchy	(France) Anthony Braizat	Termination	13 November 2023	11th	(Portugal) Ricardo Dionísio	15 November 2023	
Zürich	(Denmark) Bo Henriksen	Signed by Mainz 05	13 February 2024	3rd	(Switzerland) Murat Ural & (Switzerland) Umberto Romano (caretakers)	13 February 2024	
Young Boys	(Switzerland) Raphaël Wicky	Termination	4 March 2024	1st	(Switzerland) Joël Magnin (caretaker)	4 March 2024	
Grasshopper	(Switzerland) Bruno Berner	Termination	9 April 2024	11th	(Switzerland) Marco Schällibaum	10 April 2024	
Zürich	(Switzerland) Murat Ural & (Switzerland) Umberto Romano (caretakers)	Dismissal	22 April 2024	6th	(Netherlands) Ricardo Moniz	22 April 2024	

== Table ==
Pos	Team	Pld	W	D	L	GF	GA	GD	Pts	Qualification or relegation (Note: Teams played each other three times (33 matches), before the league was split into two groups (the top six and the bottom six).)
1	Young Boys (C)	38	23	8	7	76	34	+42	77	Qualification for the Champions League play-off round
2	Lugano	38	20	5	13	67	51	+16	65	Qualification for the Champions League second qualifying round
3	Servette	38	18	10	10	59	43	+16	64	Qualification for the Europa League third qualifying round (Note: Servette qualified for the Europa League third qualifying round as the 2023–24 Swiss Cup winners.)
4	Zürich	38	16	12	10	53	41	+12	60	Qualification for the Conference League second qualifying round
5	St. Gallen	38	16	9	13	60	51	+9	57	Qualification for the Conference League second qualifying round
6	Winterthur	38	13	10	15	60	71	−11	49	
7	Luzern	38	13	10	15	47	53	−6	49	
8	Basel	38	13	10	15	45	52	−7	49	
9	Yverdon-Sport	38	13	8	17	50	71	−21	47	
10	Lausanne-Sport	38	11	12	15	48	53	−5	45	
11	Grasshopper (O)	38	10	8	20	41	49	−8	38	Qualification for the Relegation play-off
12	Lausanne Ouchy (R)	38	7	8	23	40	77	−37	29	Relegation to Swiss Challenge League

Source: Swiss Super League
Rules for classification: 1) Points; 2) Goal difference; 3) Goals scored; 4) Head-to-head goal difference; 5) Head-to-head goals scored 6) Away goals scored; 7) Draw.
(C) Champions; (O) Play-off winners; (R) Relegated

== Results ==
=== Regular season ===
==== First and Second Rounds ====
Teams played each other twice, once at home and once away.

Home \ Away	BAS	GCZ	SLO	LS	LUG	LUZ	SER	STG	WIN	YB	YS	ZÜR
Basel	—	0–1	0–3	1–2	0–1	1–1	0–1	2–0	5–2	1–0	2–1	2–2
Grasshopper	3–1	—	5–2	5–0	2–1	0–1	1–3	1–1	0–1	0–1	1–1	2–1
Lausanne Ouchy	1–1	2–1	—	2–2	0–3	0–3	1–1	2–5	1–3	1–3	1–1	0–3
Lausanne-Sport	3–0	1–1	1–0	—	3–1	3–1	1–1	0–1	2–5	0–1	1–2	0–0
Lugano	1–3	0–0	2–3	2–1	—	1–0	0–1	1–0	2–1	1–1	6–1	0–3
Luzern	0–1	2–0	2–1	2–1	3–2	—	2–0	1–0	3–1	1–1	2–1	1–4
Servette	4–1	2–0	3–1	2–1	2–2	4–2	—	1–1	2–2	0–1	1–0	2–2
St. Gallen	2–1	3–1	4–0	2–1	1–4	2–1	0–2	—	4–2	2–1	4–0	1–0
Winterthur	1–3	3–1	2–1	1–0	2–3	0–0	3–3	2–1	—	1–4	1–1	2–1
Young Boys	3–0	1–0	1–0	2–1	4–1	6–1	1–1	3–0	5–2	—	5–1	0–0
Yverdon-Sport	3–2	0–3	2–1	2–2	0–5	2–1	4–1	1–0	1–1	2–2	—	3–0
Zürich	0–0	2–1	1–1	2–2	3–0	1–1	0–2	1–1	3–2	3–1	2–0	—

Source: Swiss Football League
Legend: Blue = home team win; Yellow = draw; Red = away team win.

==== Third Round ====
Teams played each other once, either home or away.

Home \ Away	BAS	GCZ	SLO	LS	LUG	LUZ	SER	STG	WIN	YB	YS	ZÜR
Basel	—	—	—	1–2	—	—	2–1	1–0	1–1	—	—	2–2
Grasshopper	2–1	—	—	0–1	0–1	0–1	—	1–1	—	—	—	—
Lausanne Ouchy	0–2	1–1	—	1–1	1–3	2–1	—	—	0–1	—	—	—
Lausanne-Sport	—	—	—	—	—	—	—	3–3	1–1	2–0	3–1	1–0
Lugano	2–0	—	—	2–0	—	—	—	—	—	3–3	2–0	2–0
Luzern	1–1	—	—	0–0	0–1	—	2–2	—	—	—	1–0	0–1
Servette	—	1–0	1–2	3–1	2–1	—	—	2–0	—	—	—	0–1
St. Gallen	—	—	1–0	—	2–3	1–1	—	—	2–2	2–2	5–1	—
Winterthur	—	2–0	—	—	2–2	2–1	1–0	—	—	1–2	2–1	—
Young Boys	5–1	3–0	1–0	—	—	4–2	0–1	—	—	—	—	—
Yverdon-Sport	0–2	3–2	3–0	—	—	—	2–1	—	—	0–0	—	3–2
Zürich	—	1–0	2–2	—	—	—	—	0–1	0–0	1–0	—	—

Source: Swiss Football League
Legend: Blue = home team win; Yellow = draw; Red = away team win.

=== Matches 34–38 ===
After 33 matches, the league split into two groups of six teams. The top six were grouped into the championship group and the bottom six into the relegation group, with the teams playing every other team in their group once (either at home or away). The exact matches were determined by the position of the teams in the league table at the time of the split.

==== Championship Group ====
Home \ Away	LUG	SER	STG	WIN	YB	ZUR
Lugano	—	0–2	0–1	4–2	—	—
Servette	—	—	—	2–1	0–1	—
St. Gallen	—	1–1	—	—	—	1–2
Winterthur	—	—	1–3	—	—	1–3
Young Boys	0–1	—	3–1	3–0	—	—
Zürich	2–1	2–1	—	—	0–2	—

Source: Swiss Football League
Legend: Blue = home team win; Yellow = draw; Red = away team win.

==== Relegation Group ====
Home \ Away	BAS	GCZ	SLO	LS	LUZ	YS
Basel	—	—	2–0	—	1–1	0–0
Grasshopper	0–1	—	3–2	—	—	2–0
Lausanne Ouchy	—	—	—	0–4	—	3–1
Lausanne-Sport	0–0	0–0	—	—	0–2	—
Luzern	—	1–1	1–2	—	—	—
Yverdon-Sport	—	—	—	3–1	3–1	—

Source: Swiss Football League
Legend: Blue = home team win; Yellow = draw; Red = away team win.

== Relegation play-off ==
The relegation play-off was played in a two-legged game between the eleventh placed team of the Super League (5th of the relegation group) and the second placed team of the Challenge League. The two legs of the relegation play-offs were scheduled for 26 and 31 May 2024, respectively.

The winner of the play-off was whichever team scored most in both games (no away goals rule). In case of a tie at the end of the two games, 30 minutes of extra time (two times 15 minutes) were added, followed by a penalty shoot-out, in case the teams were still tied.

=== First leg ===
26 May 2024
16:30 CEST (UTC+2)

Grasshopper	1–1	Thun
Morandi 90+7' (pen.)	Report	52' Gutbub

Letzigrund, Zürich
Attendance: 9,045
Referee: Sandro Schärer

=== Second leg ===
31 May 2024
20:30 CEST (UTC+2)

Thun	1–2	Grasshopper
Koné 43' (pen.) (red card) 90+4'	Report	3' Morandi; 90+1' Abubakar

Stockhorn Arena, Thun
Attendance: 10,014
Referee: Urs Schnyder

Grasshopper won 3–2 on aggregate.

== Statistics ==
=== Top goalscorers ===
Rank	Player	Club	Goals
1	(Democratic Republic of the Congo) Chadrac Akolo	St. Gallen	14
1	(Spain) Kevin Carlos	Yverdon-Sport	14
1	(Slovenia) Žan Celar	Lugano	14
4	(Switzerland) Antonio Marchesano	Zürich	12
4	(Switzerland) Joël Monteiro	Young Boys	12
4	(Senegal) Mamadou Kaly Sène	Lausanne-Sport	12
7	(Democratic Republic of the Congo) Jonathan Okita	Zürich	11
8	(Ivory Coast) Chris Bedia	Servette	10
8	(Switzerland) Cedric Itten	Young Boys	10
10	Five players		9

=== Hat-tricks ===
Player	Club	Against	Result	Date
(Democratic Republic of the Congo) Chadrac Akolo	St. Gallen	Winterthur	4–2 (H)	11 November 2023
(Nigeria) Francis Momoh	Grasshopper	Lausanne Ouchy	5–2 (H)	12 November 2023

== Attendances ==
The BSC Young Boys drew the highest average home attendance in the 2023-24 edition of the Swiss Super League.

#	Football club	Home games	Average attendance
1	BSC Young Boys	19	28,878
2	FC Basel	19	21,990
3	FC St. Gallen	19	17,753
4	FC Zürich	19	15,710
5	FC Luzern	19	12,810
6	FC Winterthur	19	8,170
7	Servette FC	19	7,810
8	Grasshopper Club Zürich	19	6,967
9	FC Lausanne-Sport	19	6,085
10	FC Lugano	19	3,390
11	Yverdon-Sport	19	2,800
12	Stade Lausanne Ouchy	19	2,519
