= Marco Schällibaum =

Swiss footballer and manager (born 1962)

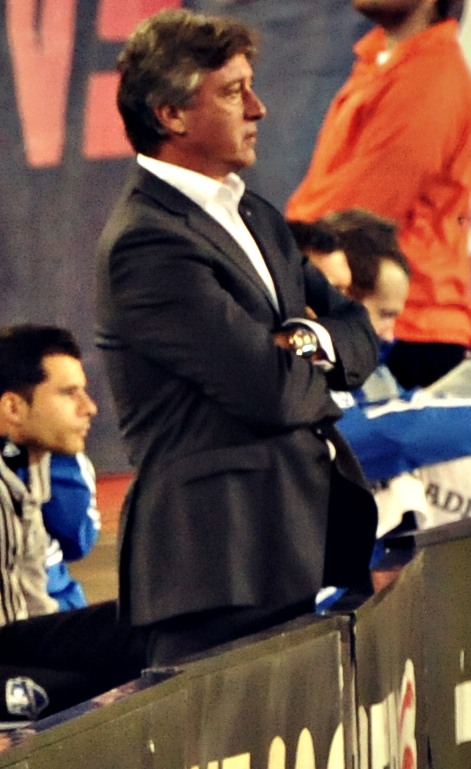
- Schällibaum coaching Montreal Impact in 2013

Personal information
- Date of birth: 6 April 1962 (age 64)
- Place of birth: Zürich, Switzerland
- Height: 1.81 m (5 ft 11 in)
- Position: Right-back

Youth career
- 1972–1980: Grasshoppers

Senior career*
Years	Team	Apps	(Gls)
1980–1985	Grasshoppers	105	(2)
1985–1987	Basel	58	(5)
1987–1993	Servette	187	(1)
1993–1995	FC Luzern	29	(1)
Total		379	(9)

International career
1983–1988	Switzerland	31	(1)

Managerial career
- 1995–1997: Nyon
- 1999: Basel
- 1999–2003: Young Boys
- 2003–2004: Servette
- 2005–2006: FC Concordia Basel
- 2006: Sion
- 2007–2008: Schaffhausen
- 2008–2009: Bellinzona
- 2010–2011: Lugano
- 2013: Montreal Impact
- 2015: Chiasso
- 2015–2017: FC Aarau
- 2018: Basel (assistant)
- 2019–2021: Basel (Academy)
- 2022: Bellinzona
- 2022–2023: Yverdon-Sport
- 2024: Grasshoppers
- * Club domestic league appearances and goals

Marco Schällibaum (born 6 April 1962) is a Swiss football manager and former player. He was most recently the manager of Swiss Super League side Grasshopper Club Zürich, whom he saved from relegation.

== Playing career ==
As a player Schällibaum played 15 years in the Swiss first division from 1980 to 1995, playing in over 450 games for various top Swiss clubs and won three league titles. He also appeared in 50 Swiss Cup games, winning the Cup in 1983 with Grasshoppers. He also played for the Swiss national football team from 1983 to 1988, making 31 appearances.

== Managerial career ==
=== Early career ===
After his career, he worked as an assistant coach at FC Basel. In 1999, he became head coach of BSC Young Boys, with whom he led the 2001 resurgence in the National League A and 2002 in the UEFA Cup. For the 2003–04 season he was coach at Servette Geneva. Later he was the coach at Concordia Basel. In November 2006, he coached FC Sion, but was released in the same month. On 2 April 2007, he signed a contract with the then relegation-threatened FC Schaffhausen. He could not prevent the descent, he remained coach at FC Schaffhausen in the Challenge League. On 28 April 2008, it was announced that he would leave at the end of Schaffhausen 2008–09 season. On 6 June 2008, however, it was announced that he would immediately leave FC Schaffhausen and join AC Bellinzona. On 1 November 2009 he was terminated by Bellinzona FC after a 0–5 home defeat against FC St. Gallen. On 17 May 2010, Marco Schällibaum took over as interim coach at FC Lugano for the Axpo Super League season 2009–10. Following the season Lugano extended his contract for the 2010–11 season. After leaving FC Lugano he was hired as a FIFA coaching instructor in Qatar, Mongolia and South Korea.

=== Montreal Impact ===
On 7 January 2013 Schällibaum was named as head coach of Major League Soccer club Montreal Impact, helping the team make the MLS playoffs in only its second season in the league. A late season collapse that saw the team limp into the post season after challenging for the Supporter's Shield (the best record in the league ) at some points during the season saw Schallibaum sacked on 18 December 2013. Schällibaum was suspended four times during the season.

Suspensions during the 2013 season
Suspension no.	No. of matches	Opponent(s)	Ref.
1	1	Columbus Crew	
2	1	Columbus Crew	
3	1	Toronto FC	
4	2	Houston Dynamo	
4	2	Philadelphia Union	

=== Return to Switzerland ===
On 22 April 2022, Schällibaum was hired by Bellinzona in the Swiss third-tier Swiss Promotion League. He left the club at the end of the season after achieving promotion to the second tier.

On 13 June 2022, he signed with Yverdon-Sport. He managed to lead the club to promotion to the Swiss Super League and championship of the 2022–23 Swiss Challenge League. It would be the club's only fifth time gaining promotion to the Swiss top-flight. On 30 October 2023, he was surprisingly terminated by Yverdon-Sport, despite the team's good performances. At the time of his dismissal, the club sat in eight place with 16 points out of twelve games.

On 10 April 2024, he was appointed as the new head coach of Grasshopper Club Zürich, also in the Swiss Super League. He thus returns to his youth club, where he had also launched his professional career. With Grasshoppers he had won the three Swiss championships and one Swiss Cup. He took over Grasshoppers in a time of crisis, as the team had slipped to the second to last place in the league with only two games won in 2024. Unable to lift the team in placement, he nonetheless coached the team to important victories. Most importantly, he successfully managed Grasshoppers to a victory over FC Thun in the relegation play-off, helping them remain in the Swiss Super League. As a result, on 3 June 2024, his contract was extended a further two years until 2026.

On 5 November 2024, Grasshoppers parted ways with Schällibaum, due to poor results. At the time of his dismissal, the club had just won one point in their last five games.

== Coaching record ==
As of 20 January 2014

Team	From	To	Record								
Team	From	To	G	W	D	L	GF	GA	GD	Win %	Ref.
Basel	15 May 1999	30 June 1999	4	0	3	1	3	4	−1	0.00	
Young Boys	1 July 1999	30 June 2003	156	65	40	51	257	229	+28	41.67	
Servette	1 July 2003	16 August 2004	45	16	8	21	71	84	−13	35.56	
Sion	1 November 2006	20 November 2006	3	1	0	2	2	6	−4	33.33	
Schaffhausen	3 April 2007	30 June 2008	48	16	15	17	68	61	+7	33.33	
Bellinzona	1 July 2008	1 November 2009	62	20	13	29	93	113	−20	32.26	
Lugano	1 July 2010	30 June 2011	33	22	2	9	64	38	+26	66.67	
Montreal Impact	7 January 2013	18 December 2013	39	15	9	15	58	56	+2	38.46	
Total			390	155	90	145	616	591	+25	39.74	—

== Honors ==
=== Manager ===
Montreal Impact

- Walt Disney World Pro Soccer Classic (1): 2013
- Canadian Championship (1): 2013

Yverdon-Sport

- Swiss Challenge League: 2022–23
