= Brighton Labeau =

Footballer (born 1996)

Personal information
- Date of birth: 1 January 1996 (age 30)
- Place of birth: Aubervilliers, France
- Height: 1.83 m (6 ft 0 in)
- Position: Forward

Team information
- Current team: Thun
- Number: 96

Senior career*
Years	Team	Apps	(Gls)
2014–2017	Monaco B	30	(10)
2017–2018	Amiens	2	(0)
2018	→ US Créteil (loan)	10	(1)
2018	→ FC Villefranche (loan)	24	(5)
2019–2020	Rapid București	23	(3)
2020–2021	Union SG	24	(6)
2021–2022	Lausanne-Ouchy	33	(16)
2022–2024	Lausanne-Sport	69	(23)
2024–2025	EA Guingamp	28	(8)
2025–	Thun	45	(6)

International career^{‡}
2022–	Martinique	23	(8)
- * Club domestic league appearances and goals as of 28 September 2026 ‡ National team caps and goals as of 17:43, 5 May 2026 (UTC)

Brighton Labeau (born 1 January 1996) is a professional footballer who plays as a forward for Swiss Super League club Thun. Born in metropolitan France, he plays for the Martinique national team.

== Club career ==
Labeau made his professional debut for Amiens in a 2–0 Ligue 1 loss to Paris Saint-Germain on 5 August 2017.

On 3 August 2021, he signed with Lausanne-Ouchy in Switzerland.

On 28 June 2022, Labeau moved to Lausanne-Sport.

On 26 July 2024, he joined Ligue 2 side En Avant Guingamp.

On 5 August 2025, he returned to Switzerland, this time joining recently promoted FC Thun. He signed on a two-year contract with an option for a further year. He became Thun's record transfer, with a reported transfer sum of up to SFr 700,000. He helped Thun win their first ever first division title, the 2025–26 Swiss Super League.

== International career ==
Born in mainland France, Labeau is of Martiniquais descent. He was called up to represent the Martinique regional team for a pair of friendlies in March 2022. He debuted with Martinique in a friendly 4–3 win over Guadeloupe on 26 March 2022.

== Career statistics ==
=== International ===
As of match played 18 November 2025

Appearances and goals by national team and year
National team	Year	Apps	Goals
Martinique	2022	4	0
Martinique	2023	11	5
Martinique	2024	5	3
Martinique	2025	3	0
Total		23	8

Scores and results list Martinique's goal tally first, score column indicates score after each Labeau goal.

List of international goals scored by Brighton Labeau
No.	Date	Venue	Opponent	Score	Result	Competition	Ref.
1	10 June 2023	Palm Beach Gardens, United States	Guyana	1–0	2–0	Friendly	
2	16 June 2023	DRV PNK Stadium, Fort Lauderdale, United States	Saint Lucia	2–1	3–1	2023 CONCACAF Gold Cup qualification	
3	20 June 2023	DRV PNK Stadium, Fort Lauderdale, United States	Puerto Rico	1–0	2–0	2023 CONCACAF Gold Cup qualification	
4	4 July 2023	Red Bull Arena, Harrison, United States	Costa Rica	3–4	4–6	2023 CONCACAF Gold Cup	
5	10 September 2023	Stade Pierre-Aliker, Fort-de-France, Martinique	Curaçao	1–0	1–0	2023–24 CONCACAF Nations League A	
6	24 March 2024	Yanmar Stadion, Almere, Netherlands	Suriname	1–0	1–1	Friendly	
7	9 September 2024	Stade Pierre-Aliker, Fort-de-France, Martinique	Guyana	1–2	2–2	2024–25 CONCACAF Nations League A	
8	11 October 2024	Le Gosier, Guadeloupe	Guadeloupe	1–0	1–0	2024–25 CONCACAF Nations League A	

== Honours ==
Union Saint-Gilloise

- Challenger Pro League: 2020–21

Thun

- Swiss Super League: 2025–26

Individual

- Swiss Challenge League top scorer: 2022–23 (shared with Teddy Okou)
