= Alban Ajdini =

Kosovan footballer (born 1999)

Personal information
- Date of birth: 9 July 1999 (age 27)
- Place of birth: Geneva, Switzerland
- Height: 1.85 m (6 ft 1 in)
- Position: Winger

Team information
- Current team: Lausanne-Sport
- Number: 7

Youth career
- –2017: Servette

Senior career*
| Years | Team | Apps | (Gls) |
| 2017–2020 | Servette U21 | 47 | (11) |
| 2020–2021 | Servette | 5 | (0) |
| 2021 | → Stade Lausanne Ouchy (loan) | 14 | (4) |
| 2021–2024 | Stade Lausanne Ouchy | 104 | (23) |
| 2024– | Lausanne-Sport | 64 | (7) |

International career
| 2020 | Kosovo U21 | 2 | (0) |
| 2023 | Kosovo | 1 | (0) |
- * Club domestic league appearances and goals as of 25 October 2026

Alban Ajdini (born 9 July 1999) is a professional footballer who plays as a winger for Swiss Super League club Lausanne-Sport. Born in Switzerland, he plays for the Kosovo national team.

== Club career ==
=== Servette ===
On 5 June 2020, Ajdini signed his first professional contract with Swiss Super League side Servette after agreeing to a two-year deal. On 19 July 2020, he made his debut in a 2–2 home draw against Basel after coming on as a substitute at 85th minute in place of Alex Schalk.

=== Loan to Stade Lausanne Ouchy ===
On 11 January 2021, Ajdini was loaned for six months to the Swiss Challenge League side Stade Lausanne Ouchy, and received squad number 17. His debut with Stade Lausanne Ouchy came eleven days later against Grasshoppers after coming on as a substitute at 60th minute in place of Roland Ndongo.

=== Stade Lausanne Ouchy ===
On 14 June 2021, Stade Lausanne Ouchy triggered a clause in Ajdini's loan agreement to make his transfer permanent. He made his league debut against Yverdon-Sport on 31 July 2021. Ajdini scored his first league goal against Schaffhausen on 10 September 2021, scoring in the 60th minute.

=== Lausanne-Sport ===
On 14 June 2024, Ajdini signed a three-year contract with Swiss Super League club Lausanne-Sport and receiving squad number 7. He made his league debut against Basel on 21 July 2024.

== International career ==
On 2 October 2020, Ajdini received a call-up from Kosovo U21 for UEFA Euro 2021 qualification matches against Austria U21 and Andorra U21. Seven days later, he made his debut with Kosovo U21 in the match against Austria U21 after being named in the starting line-up.

Ajdini made his full international debut against Belarus on 21 November 2023.

== Career statistics ==
=== Club ===
As of 14 June 2024

| Club | Season | League | | | Cup | | Continental | | Total | |
| Club | Season | Division | Apps | Goals | Apps | Goals | Apps | Goals | Apps | Goals |
|---|---|---|---|---|---|---|---|---|---|---|
| Servette U21 | 2016–17 | 2. Liga Interregional | 2 | 0 | 0 | 0 | — | | 2 | 0 |
| Servette U21 | 2017–18 | 2. Liga Interregional | 18 | 3 | 0 | 0 | — | | 18 | 3 |
| Servette U21 | 2018–19 | 2. Liga Interregional | 12 | 2 | 0 | 0 | — | | 12 | 2 |
| Servette U21 | 2019–20 | 2. Liga Interregional | 13 | 5 | 0 | 0 | — | | 13 | 5 |
| Servette U21 | 2020–21 | 2. Liga Interregional | 2 | 1 | 0 | 0 | — | | 2 | 1 |
| Servette U21 | Total | | 47 | 11 | 0 | 0 | — | | 47 | 11 |
| Servette | 2019–20 | Swiss Super League | 4 | 0 | 0 | 0 | — | | 4 | 0 |
| Servette | 2020–21 | Swiss Super League | 1 | 0 | 0 | 0 | 0 | 0 | 1 | 0 |
| Servette | Total | | 5 | 0 | 0 | 0 | 0 | 0 | 5 | 0 |
| Stade Lausanne Ouchy | 2020–21 (loan) | Swiss Challenge League | 14 | 4 | 0 | 0 | — | | 14 | 4 |
| Stade Lausanne Ouchy | 2021–22 | Swiss Challenge League | 32 | 2 | 2 | 2 | — | | 34 | 4 |
| Stade Lausanne Ouchy | 2022–23 | Swiss Challenge League | 36 | 13 | 2 | 1 | — | | 38 | 14 |
| Stade Lausanne Ouchy | 2023–24 | Swiss Super League | 36 | 8 | 2 | 1 | — | | 38 | 9 |
| Stade Lausanne Ouchy | Total | | 118 | 27 | 6 | 4 | — | | 124 | 31 |
| Lausanne-Sport | 2024–25 | Swiss Super League | 0 | 0 | 0 | 0 | — | | 0 | 0 |
| Career total | | | 170 | 38 | 6 | 4 | 0 | 0 | 176 | 42 |

=== International ===
As of 21 November 2023

Appearances and goals by national team and year
| National team | Year | Apps | Goals |
|---|---|---|---|
| Kosovo | 2023 | 1 | 0 |
| Total | | 1 | 0 |
