= Christian Constantin =

Swiss architect

Personal information
- Date of birth: 7 January 1957 (age 69)
- Position: Goalkeeper

Senior career*
| Years | Team | Apps | (Gls) |
| 1977–1979 | Neuchâtel Xamax | 0 | (0) |
| 1979–1980 | FC Lugano | 0 | (0) |
| 1981–1982 | FC Monthey | 0 | (0) |
| 1983–1984 | FC Martigny-Sports | 0 | (0) |
| Total | | 0 | (0) |
- * Club domestic league appearances and goals

Christian Constantin (born 7 January 1957) is a Swiss architect and former goalkeeper. He is also the owner and Chairman of Swiss football club FC Sion. He bought the club, which had neared bankruptcy and was relegated from the Swiss Super League, in 2003.

== Controversies ==
During his ownership of FC Sion, Constantin has made upwards of 50 managerial changes and appointed himself as manager in 2008 and 2021. He once fired a head coach because of his scent and allegedly assaulted Swiss league referee Markus von Känel in 2004 during a live match broadcast. In 2017, he kicked Austrian pundit and former coach Rolf Fringer down to the ground on live television during a Swiss league match for which he received a 14-month ban.

In 2023, he fired Sion's then-manager David Bettoni at half-time during a match against Servette before forcing him to stand on the side lines for the remainder of the game. In a separate episode, he verbally confronted Mario Balotelli (whom he had signed). In 2011, Constantin signed six players under a transfer ban because of what happened with Essam El-Hadary’s transfer, and appeared on live TV on a horse.

== Career ==
Yet under his presidency, the club also experienced considerable success, such as winning the Swiss Cup in 2006, 2009, 2011 and 2015.

Constantin was formerly a goalkeeper who played for Neuchâtel Xamax (1977–1979), FC Lugano (1979–1980), FC Monthey (1981–1982) and FC Martigny-Sports (1983–1984).

In March 2020, Constantin sacked 9 of his FC Sion first-team players after they refused to take a pay cut after the outbreak of the COVID-19 and suspension of the Swiss Super League.

In 2014, Constantin appointed his son Barthélémy as Sporting Director of FC Sion, a position he has held ever since.
