= Stefano Maccoppi =

Italian footballer

Personal information
- Date of birth: 21 April 1962 (age 64)
- Place of birth: Milan, Italy
- Height: 1.86 m (6 ft 1 in)
- Position: Defender

Senior career*
Years	Team	Apps	(Gls)
1982–1990	Como		
1984–1985	Sambenedettese		
1990	Ancona		
1990–1992	Bari		
1992–1997	Piacenza		

Managerial career
- 1997–2000: Piacenza (youth)
- 2000–2001: Fiorenzuola
- 2001–2003: Sampdoria (B)
- 2003–2005: Palazzolo
- 2005: Bellinzona
- 2008–2009: La Chaux-de-Fonds
- 2010: TP Mazembe (assistant)
- 2010–2011: Yverdon-Sport
- 2011–2012: Neuchâtel Xamax (youth director)
- 2012–2014: Locarno
- 2014: Sion (assistant)
- 2016: Ceahlăul Piatra Neamț
- 2018: Pro Piacenza
- 2019: Sliema Wanderers
- 2019: Chiasso
- 2022: Tsarsko Selo
- 2023: Bellinzona
- 2024: Como Women
- * Club domestic league appearances and goals

Stefano Maccoppi (born 21 April 1962) is an Italian football manager and former player. He is the former head coach of Como Women. He played as a defender.

== Coaching career ==
In January 2023, Maccoppi was named manager of AC Bellinzona, playing in the Swiss Challenge League.

In March 2024, Maccoppi took over at the helm of Como Women of the Serie A women's league, serving until the end of the season.
