= Alessandro Mangiarratti =

Swiss footballer and manager (born 1978)

Personal information
- Date of birth: 15 September 1978 (age 48)
- Height: 1.82 m (6 ft 0 in)
- Position: Defender

Team information
- Current team: Yverdon Sport (manager)

Senior career*
Years	Team	Apps	(Gls)
1999–2001	AC Bellinzona	18	(0)
2000	FC Schaffhausen (on loan)	11	(0)
2001	Grasshopper U-21	17	(0)
2002–2004	FC Wil 1900	58	(0)
2004	Belenenses	4	(0)
2004–2005	Atlas	1	(0)
2005–2006	FC Locarno	30	(0)
2006–2015	AC Bellinzona	87	(0)

Managerial career
- 2015–2018: Team Ticino (youth)
- 2017–2018: Switzerland U17 (assistant)
- 2018: FC Chiasso
- 2018–2019: FC Chiasso (technical director)
- 2019–2021: BSC Young Boys (youth/U21)
- 2021–2022: FC Vaduz
- 2023–2024: Yverdon-Sport FC
- * Club domestic league appearances and goals as of 22 June 2008

Alessandro Mangiarratti (born 15 September 1978) is a Swiss football coach and a former defender. He was most recently the coach of Swiss Super League side Yverdon-Sport FC.

== Coaching career ==
On 23 December 2021, Mangiarratti was hired as the head coach by FC Vaduz until the summer of 2023. At the start of the 2022–23 season, he made history by leading Vaduz to qualification to the group stage of the Europa Conference League, the first Liechtensteiner club to qualify for a European tournament. Despite this international success, the team was struggling in the league. Due to the intense schedule, Mangiarratti decided to step down from his position as coach on 16 November 2022.

On 31 October 2023, he was appointed as the new manager of Swiss Super League side Yverdon-Sport FC. It is his first coaching appointment in a national top flight. Despite holding off relegation and achieving the goal of reaching ninth place in the 2023–24 season, he was dismissed as Yverdon's head coach on 17 December 2024, due to the team's performances in his second season. At the time of his termination, just as the beginning of the winter break, Yverdon sat in tenth place, just two points above the relegation zone.
