= Jérémy Frick =

Swiss footballer (born 1993)

Personal information
- Date of birth: March 8, 1993 (age 33)
- Place of birth: Geneva, Switzerland
- Height: 1.92 m (6 ft 4 in)
- Position: Goalkeeper

Team information
- Current team: Servette
- Number: 32

Youth career
- 2002–2006: FC Collex-Bossy
- 2006–2009: Servette
- 2009–2011: Lyon

Senior career*
Years	Team	Apps	(Gls)
2011–2015	Lyon II	48	(1)
2014–2015	→ Servette (loan)	17	(0)
2015–2016	Biel-Bienne	29	(0)
2016–	Servette	254	(0)

International career^{‡}
2011	Switzerland U19	1	(0)
- * Club domestic league appearances and goals as of 26 May 2026 ‡ National team caps and goals as of 10:59, 4 August 2022 (UTC)

Jérémy Frick (born 8 March 1993) is a Swiss professional footballer who plays as a goalkeeper for Swiss Super League club Servette.

== Professional career ==
A youth product of Servette and Lyon, Frick moved to the senior team of Servette in 2016. In 2023, Frick got called up for the Swiss national team for the Euro 2024 qualifiers but he did not get an appearance.

== Career statistics ==
As of match played 24 May 2025

Appearances and goals by club, season and competition
Club	Season	League			Cup		Continental		Other		Total	
Club	Season	Division	Apps	Goals	Apps	Goals	Apps	Goals	Apps	Goals	Apps	Goals
Lyon II	2010–11	CFA	1	0	—		—		—		1	0
Lyon II	2011–12	CFA	4	0	—		—		—		4	0
Lyon II	2012–13	CFA	19	1	—		—		—		19	1
Lyon II	2013–14	CFA	20	0	—		—		—		20	0
Lyon II	2014–15	CFA	4	0	—		—		—		4	0
Lyon II	Total		48	1	—		—		—		48	1
Servette (loan)	2014–15	Swiss Challenge League	17	0	—		—		—		17	0
Biel-Bienne	2015–16	Swiss Challenge League	29	0	0	0	—		—		29	0
Servette	2016–17	Swiss Challenge League	24	0	1	0	—		—		25	0
Servette	2017–18	Swiss Challenge League	27	0	0	0	—		—		27	0
Servette	2018–19	Swiss Challenge League	31	0	2	0	—		—		33	0
Servette	2019–20	Swiss Super League	34	0	0	0	—		—		34	0
Servette	2020–21	Swiss Super League	33	0	2	0	2	0	—		37	0
Servette	2021–22	Swiss Super League	33	0	1	0	2	0	—		36	0
Servette	2022–23	Swiss Super League	35	0	1	0	—		—		36	0
Servette	2023–24	Swiss Super League	13	0	5	0	12	0	—		30	0
Servette	2024–25	Swiss Super League	13	0	1	0	3	0	—		17	0
Servette	Total		243	0	13	0	19	0	—		275	0
Career total			337	1	13	0	19	0	0	0	369	1

== Honours ==
Individual

- Swiss Super League Player of the Month: July 2022
