= Vartan Sirmakes =

Businessman in Switzerland

Vartan Sirmakes (Armenian: Վարդան Սրմաքեշ; born 11 February 1956) is a businessman who is the owner of Ararat Yerevan and Lausanne Ouchy.
