= Gabriel Kyeremateng =

German footballer (born 1999)

Personal information
- Date of birth: 28 April 1999 (age 27)
- Place of birth: Dortmund, Germany
- Height: 1.83 m (6 ft 0 in)
- Position: Forward

Team information
- Current team: AC Bellinzona
- Number: 49

Youth career
- –2007: Eintracht Dortmund
- 2007–2018: Borussia Dortmund
- 2018–2020: Stoke City

Senior career*
Years	Team	Apps	(Gls)
2020–2023	Thun	95	(27)
2023–2024	Beveren	7	(0)
2024	→ Lausanne Ouchy (loan)	12	(1)
2024–2025	SC Verl	3	(0)
2026–	AC Bellinzona	3	(2)

International career
2014	Germany U15	2	(0)
2014–2015	Germany U16	7	(2)
2016–2017	Germany U18	6	(1)
- * Club domestic league appearances and goals as of 30 September 2026

Gabriel Kyeremateng (born 28 April 1999) is a German professional footballer who plays as a forward for Swiss Promotion League club AC Bellinzona.

== Club career ==
Kyeremateng started playing football in his hometown at local team Eintracht Dortmund. In 2007, he joined the youth academy of Borussia Dortmund and moved through the youth teams of the club. He played 29 games for the Dortmund U17 team in the Under 17 Bundesliga and 43 games for the Dortmund U19 team in the Under 19 Bundesliga. He also made 10 appearances in the UEFA Youth League.

In 2018, Kyeremateng joined Stoke City, playing for their U23 team in Premier League 2 Division 2. In his two years at Stoke, he made 32 appearances and scored 14 goals for the reserve team. In October 2020, he moved to Swiss Challenge League club FC Thun.

In June 2023, Kyeremateng joined Belgian Challenger Pro League side Beveren, signing a deal until June 2026, with an option for one further year. In January 2024, he joined Swiss Super League club Lausanne Ouchy on loan until the end of the season.

On 30 August 2024, Kyeremateng returned to Germany and signed with SC Verl in 3. Liga.

== International career ==
Kyeremateng was born in Germany and is of Ghanaian descent. He has played for the German junior national teams at the U15, U16 and U18 levels.
