= Aiyegun Tosin =

Footballer (born 1998)

Personal information
- Full name: Oluwatosin Aiyegun
- Date of birth: 26 June 1998 (age 28)
- Place of birth: Lagos, Nigeria
- Height: 1.79 m (5 ft 10 in)
- Position: Forward

Team information
- Current team: Lorient
- Number: 15

Youth career
- Real Sapphire

Senior career*
Years	Team	Apps	(Gls)
2017–2019	Ventspils	72	(33)
2019–2023	Zürich	91	(31)
2023–	Lorient	72	(10)

International career^{‡}
2022–	Benin	30	(8)
- * Club domestic league appearances and goals as of 19 May 2026 ‡ National team caps and goals as of 12 November 2026

Oluwatosin Aiyegun (born 26 June 1998), known as Aiyegun Tosin, is a professional footballer who plays for Ligue 1 club Lorient. Born in Nigeria, he plays for the Benin national team.

== Club career ==
On 2 September 2019, Tosin joined Swiss club Zürich on a contract until the summer 2023.

On 25 July 2023, Ligue 1 side Lorient announced the signing of Tosin on a four-year contract, for a reported fee of €4 million.

== International career ==
Tosin was born in Nigeria to a Nigerian father and a Beninese mother. He was called up to the Benin national team for a set of friendlies in March 2022. He debuted with Benin in a 4–0 friendly win over Liberia on 24 March 2022, scoring a goal in his debut.

== Career statistics ==
=== Club ===
As of match played 2 May 2026

Appearances and goals by club, season and competition
Club	Season	League			National Cup		Continental		Total	
Club	Season	Division	Apps	Goals	Apps	Goals	Apps	Goals	Apps	Goals
Ventspils	2017	Virslīga	22	9	5	2	2 (Note: Appearance(s) in UEFA Europa League)	0	29	11
Ventspils	2018	Virslīga	27	13	2	0	4	1	33	14
Ventspils	2019	Virslīga	23	11	—		6	2	29	13
Ventspils	Total		72	33	7	2	12	3	91	38
Zürich	2019–20	Swiss Super League	18	7	1	0	—		19	7
Zürich	2020–21	Swiss Super League	24	6	0	0	—		24	6
Zürich	2021–22	Swiss Super League	22	6	0	0	—		22	6
Zürich	2022–23	Swiss Super League	27	12	1	3	11 (Note: Two appearances in UEFA Champions League, Nine appearances, One goal in UEFA Europa League)	1	39	16
Zürich	Total		91	31	2	3	11	1	104	35
Lorient	2023–24	Ligue 1	19	2	1	0	—		20	2
Lorient	2024–25	Ligue 2	26	3	1	1	—		27	4
Lorient	2025–26	Ligue 1	25	5	1	0	—		26	5
Lorient	Total		70	10	3	1	—		73	11
Career Total			233	74	12	6	23	4	268	84

=== International ===
As of match played 12 November 2026

Appearances and goals by national team and year
National team	Year	Apps	Goals
Benin	2022	7	3
Benin	2023	5	0
Benin	2024	6	0
Benin	2025	6	1
Benin	2026	6	4
Total		30	8

Scores and results list Benin's goal tally first, score column indicates score after each Aiyegun goal.

List of international goals scored by Oluwatosin "Tosin" Aiyegun
No.	Date	Venue	Opponent	Score	Result	Competition
1	24 March 2022	Mardan Sports Complex, Aksu, Turkey	Liberia	2–0	4–0	Friendly
2	27 March 2022	Mardan Sports Complex, Aksu, Turkey	Zambia	2–1	2–1	Friendly
3	27 September 2022	El Bachir Stadium, Mohammedia, Morocco	Madagascar	1–1	1–3	Friendly
4	10 October 2025	Amahoro Stadium, Kigali, Rwanda	Rwanda	1–0	1–0	2026 FIFA World Cup qualification
5	27 March 2026	Père Jégo Stadium, Casablanca, Morocco	Liberia	1–0	1–0	Friendly
6	25 September 2026	4 August Stadium, Ouagadougou, Burkina Faso	Burkina Faso	1–1	1–1	2027 Africa Cup of Nations qualification
7	12 November 2026	Félix Houphouët-Boigny Stadium, Abidjan, Ivory Coast	Central African Republic	3–1	4–1	2027 Africa Cup of Nations qualification
8	12 November 2026	Félix Houphouët-Boigny Stadium, Abidjan, Ivory Coast	Central African Republic	4–1	4–1	2027 Africa Cup of Nations qualification

== Honours ==
Zürich

- Swiss Super League: 2021–22

Lorient

- Ligue 2: 2024–25
