= David Bettoni =

French footballer (born 1971)

Personal information
- Date of birth: 23 November 1971 (age 54)
- Place of birth: Saint-Priest, Metropolis of Lyon, France
- Height: 1.78 m (5 ft 10 in)
- Position: Midfielder

Youth career
- ASPTT Lyon
- Cannes

Senior career*
Years	Team	Apps	(Gls)
1991–1996	Cannes	30	(0)
1993–1994	→ Istres (loan)	34	(0)
1995–1996	→ Alès (loan)	19	(0)
1996–1997	Avezzano	15	(0)
1997–1999	Alessandria	34	(1)
1999	Novara	7	(0)
1999–2000	Lucchese	21	(0)
2000–2001	Brescello	20	(1)
2002–2003	Créteil	28	(0)
2003–2004	Cannes	7	(0)
Total		215	(2)

Managerial career
- 2006–2013: Cannes (youth)
- 2014–2016: Real Madrid B (assistant)
- 2016–2018: Real Madrid (assistant)
- 2019–2021: Real Madrid (assistant)
- 2023: Sion
- 2024–2025: Club Africain
- 2026–: France (assistant)
- * Club domestic league appearances and goals

David Bettoni (born 23 November 1971) is a French professional football manager and former player. He is currently the assistant manager for the France national football team.

== Managerial career ==
Bettoni first met Zinedine Zidane when they were both playing for the youth side of Cannes.

Bettoni was invited at Real Madrid to work as a scout in 2013, identifying exciting young talents. Prior to landing in Madrid he was in charge of the system for bringing young players through at Cannes.

Bettoni joined the coaching staff of his friend, when Zidane was appointed as the head coach of Real Madrid Castilla in summer 2014. Later, Bettoni followed Zidane, when the latter took charge at Real Madrid's first team. However, the club later confirmed that Bettoni wasn't an assistant coach, but served as a member of the technical team that serves the first team and assists the head coach.

On 23 January 2021, Bettoni managed the team in a 4–1 away win against Alavés after Zidane tested positive for COVID-19.

In March 2023, Bettoni was named new head coach of Swiss side Sion. His first appointment as a head coach came to an abrupt end in May, after only ten games. During his time at Sion, the team managed just two wins and two draws, along with six losses, the last of which was a 0–5 away loss to Romandy rivals Servette. According to Sion defender Reto Ziegler, he was terminated during half-time, after Sion was down 0–3 after only nine minutes. However, some confusion concerning these events exists, as Bettoni had returned to the bench after the break and reportedly announced his resignation the next day. At the time of his appointment, Sion were in 9th place (out of ten). They had slipped to last place following a 0–1 home loss to Winterthur, who thus overtook them, in Bettoni's second-to-last game on the sideline.

In July 2024, he joined Club Africain in Tunisia but was sacked the following year.
