= Francesco Ruberto =

Italian footballer (born 1993)

Personal information
- Date of birth: 19 March 1993 (age 33)
- Place of birth: Sambiase, Italy
- Height: 1.84 m (6 ft 0 in)
- Position: Goalkeeper

Team information
- Current team: Sion
- Number: 12

Youth career
- Young Boys
- 2012–2013: Thun

Senior career*
Years	Team	Apps	(Gls)
2012	Bern	10	(0)
2013–2019	Thun	34	(0)
2020–2021	Pirin Blagoevgrad	3	(0)
2021–2023	Schaffhausen	65	(0)
2023–2025	Vizela	12	(0)
2025–	Sion	1	(0)
- * Club domestic league appearances and goals as of 17 September 2025

Francesco Ruberto (born 19 March 1993) is an Italian professional footballer who plays as a goalkeeper for Swiss Super League club Sion. He also holds Swiss citizenship.

== Career ==
On 3 July 2025, Ruberto returned to Switzerland and signed a three-year contract with Sion.
