= Liridon Mulaj =

Swiss footballer (born 1999)

Personal information
- Date of birth: 4 January 1999 (age 27)
- Place of birth: Biel/Bienne, Switzerland
- Height: 1.75 m (5 ft 9 in)
- Position: Midfielder

Team information
- Current team: Neuchâtel Xamax
- Number: 10

Youth career
- 2008–2013: Biel-Bienne
- 2013–2016: Neuchâtel Xamax

Senior career*
Years	Team	Apps	(Gls)
2016–2020	Neuchâtel Xamax	30	(1)
2019	→ Winterthur (loan)	4	(0)
2019	→ Winterthur II (loan)	3	(1)
2019	Neuchâtel Xamax II	2	(2)
2020–2022	Kriens	63	(8)
2022–2024	Stade Lausanne	60	(13)
2024–2025	VfL Osnabrück	3	(0)
2025–	Neuchâtel Xamax	36	(11)

International career^{‡}
2014	Switzerland U16	2	(0)
2017–2018	Switzerland U19	4	(2)
2018–2019	Switzerland U20	6	(2)
- * Club domestic league appearances and goals as of 28 September 2026 ‡ National team caps and goals as of 19 June 2023

Liridon Mulaj (born 4 January 1999) is a Swiss professional footballer who plays as a midfielder for Swiss Challenge League club Neuchâtel Xamax.

== Club career ==
Mulaj made his professional for Neuchâtel Xamax in a 3–3 Swiss Super League loss to FC St. Gallen on 2 September 2018. In August 2017, he scored seven goals in the same game, during a Swiss Cup match against US Montfaucon (final score 21–0).

Mulaj was loaned out to FC Winterthur on 12 January 2019, for the rest of the season.

On 19 August 2022, Mulaj signed with Stade Lausanne.

On 18 June 2024, Mulaj joined VfL Osnabrück in the German 3. Liga.

On 5 January 2025, Mulaj returned to Neuchâtel Xamax.

== International career ==
Born in Switzerland, Mulaj is of Kosovo Albanian descent. He is a former youth international for Switzerland.
