= David Douline =

French professional footballer (born 1993)

Personal information
- Date of birth: 28 May 1993 (age 33)
- Place of birth: Grenoble, France
- Height: 1.82 m (6 ft 0 in)
- Position: Midfielder

Team information
- Current team: Servette
- Number: 28

Youth career
- 2007–2012: Saint-Étienne

Senior career*
Years	Team	Apps	(Gls)
2010–2012	Saint-Étienne II	23	(1)
2012–2013	Évian Thonon II	15	(1)
2013–2015	Monts d'Or Azergues Foot	39	(4)
2015–2017	Le Puy Foot 43 Auvergne	32	(10)
2017	Clermont II	5	(0)
2017–2019	Clermont	20	(2)
2018–2019	→ Rodez (loan)	27	(3)
2019–2021	Rodez	56	(4)
2021–	Servette	121	(7)
- * Club domestic league appearances and goals as of 28 September 2026

David Douline (born 28 May 1993) is a French professional footballer who plays as a midfielder for Swiss club Servette.

== Professional career ==
Douline is a youth academy product of AS Saint-Étienne. He signed for Clermont Foot in the summer of 2017 after a successful seasons in the lower divisions of France. He was set to be loaned to Rodez AF, but the deal fell through after administrative errors by Clermont. Douline made his professional debut for Clermont Foot in a Ligue 2 2–0 win over LB Châteauroux on 19 September 2017.

Douline joined Rodez AF on loan for the 2018–19 season.

On 22 June 2021, he joined Servette in Switzerland on a two-year contract.

== Honours ==
Servette FC

- Swiss Cup: 2023–24
