= Koro Koné =

Ivorian footballer

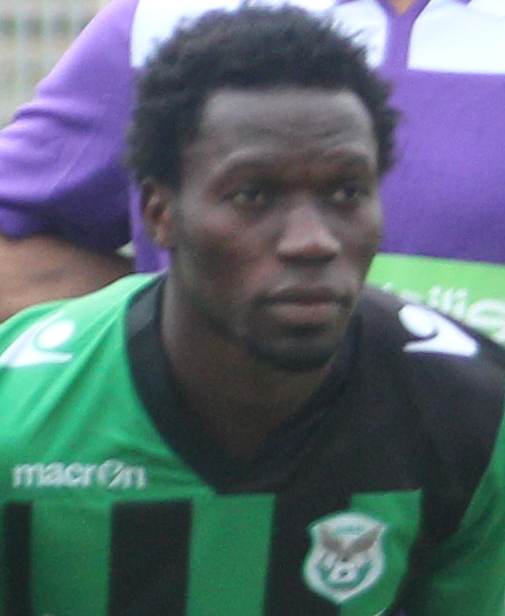

Personal information
- Full name: Koro Issa Ahmed Koné
- Date of birth: 5 July 1989 (age 37)
- Place of birth: Abidjan, Ivory Coast
- Height: 1.78 m (5 ft 10 in)
- Position: Forward

Team information
- Current team: Champagne Sports
- Number: 18

Youth career
- 2005: CFDF Seni Fofana
- 2005–2006: Jomo Cosmos
- 2006–2007: Grasshoppers Zürich
- 2007–2008: MSV Duisburg

Senior career*
Years	Team	Apps	(Gls)
2008–2009	Hertha Berlin II	0	(0)
2009–2011	Spartak Trnava	62	(19)
2012–2015	Dijon	61	(11)
2015	→ Arles-Avignon (loan)	15	(5)
2015–2016	Constantine	10	(1)
2017	Sedan	14	(7)
2017–2018	Boulogne	28	(14)
2018–2021	Servette	77	(23)
2021–2023	Yverdon	52	(25)
2023–2024	Thun	32	(11)
2024–2026	Xamax	54	(14)
2026–	Champagne Sports	6	(3)

International career
- Ivory Coast U17
- Ivory Coast U20
- * Club domestic league appearances and goals as of 24 September 2026

Koro Issa Ahmed Koné (born 5 July 1989), known as Koro Koné, is an Ivorian footballer who plays as a forward for Swiss 2. Liga Interregional club Champagne Sports.

== Career ==
He came to Spartak Trnava from Hertha BSC II in March 2009. Previously, he played for youth teams of CFDF Seni Fofana, Jomo Cosmos, Grasshoppers Zürich and MSV Duisburg. In July 2015, he signed a contract with the Algerian club CS Constantine for 2 years.

On 10 June 2024, Koné agreed to join Xamax.

== International career ==
Koné played for the Ivory Coast national under-20 football team and played for the U-17 the CAN 2005.

== Career statistics ==
As of 15 December 2012

Appearances and goals by club, season and competition
Club	Season	League		Cup		League Cup		Europe		Total	
Club	Season	Apps	Goals	Apps	Goals	Apps	Goals	Apps	Goals	Apps	Goals
FC Spartak Trnava	2008–09	2	0	0	0	–		0	0	2	0
FC Spartak Trnava	2009–10	26	5	5	2	–		1	0	32	7
FC Spartak Trnava	2010–11	25	10	6	4	–		0	0	31	14
FC Spartak Trnava	2011–12	9	4	4	3	–		3	1	16	8
Total		62	19	15	9	–		4	1	81	29
Dijon FCO	2011–12	16	2	2	1	0	0	0	0	18	3
Dijon FCO	2012–13	12	3	0	0	2	1	0	0	14	4
Total		28	5	2	1	2	1	0	0	32	7
Career total		90	24	17	10	2	1	4	1	113	36

== Honours ==
Individual

- Swiss Cup Top Scorer: 2021–22 (Shared),
