= Teddy Okou =

Swiss footballer (born 1998)

Personal information
- Full name: Teddy Léo Junior Okou
- Date of birth: 15 May 1998 (age 28)
- Place of birth: Paris, France
- Height: 1.66 m (5 ft 5 in)
- Position: Winger

Team information
- Current team: Al-Riyadh
- Number: 10

Youth career
- 2007–2009: USA Clichy
- 2009–2010: Red Star
- 2010–2011: US Ivry
- 2011–2012: Le Havre AC
- 2012–2013: US Créteil-Lusitanos
- 2013–2015: Le Havre AC

Senior career*
Years	Team	Apps	(Gls)
2015–2018	Le Havre II	51	(1)
2017	Le Havre	0	(0)
2018–2020	Lille II	30	(9)
2019–2020	→ Créteil II (loan)	2	(0)
2019–2020	→ Créteil (loan)	9	(0)
2020–2022	Boulogne	35	(3)
2021	Boulogne II	1	(0)
2022–2023	Stade Lausanne	48	(22)
2023–2025	Luzern	28	(3)
2024–2025	→ Lausanne-Sport (loan)	37	(7)
2025–	Al-Riyadh	43	(5)

International career
2014	France U17	2	(0)
- * Club domestic league appearances and goals as of 23:38, 15 November 2026 (UTC)

Teddy Léo Junior Okou (born 15 May 1998) is a French professional footballer who plays as a winger for Saudi Pro League club Al-Riyadh.

== Club career ==
Okou is a youth product of the French clubs USA Clichy, Red Star, Ivry, Le Havre and Creteil. He began his senior career with the reserves of Le Havre in the Championnat National 3 in 2015. He made his professional debut with the senior Le Havre team in a 4–4 (5–4) Coupe de la Ligue penalty shootout win over Nîmes on 8 August 2017, assisting his side's fourth goal. On 15 July 2018, he signed his first professional contract with Lille where he was originally assigned to their reserves. His stay with Lille was cut short after an injury kept him out for seven months. On 24 July 2019, he moved on loan to the Championnat National side Creteil, in a year where he suffered from athletic pubalgia. On 8 October 2020, he moved to Boulogne, also in the Championnat National on a two-year contract.

On 8 January 2022, Okou moved to the Swiss Challenge League club Stade Lausanne Ouchy. In his second season with Stade Lausanne Ouchy, he had 19 goals and 8 assists and was top scorer in a season that saw the club achieve promotion.

After stints at Swiss clubs Luzern and Lausanne-Sport, he joined Saudi Pro League club Al-Riyadh.

== International career ==
Okou holds both French and Ivorian nationalities. He is a youth international for France, having played for the France U17s in 2014.

== Honours ==
Individual

- Swiss Challenge League top scorer: 2022–23
