= Valon Fazliu =

Swiss footballer (born 1996)

Personal information
- Date of birth: 2 February 1996 (age 30)
- Place of birth: Dielsdorf, Switzerland
- Height: 1.83 m (6 ft 0 in)
- Position: Attacking midfielder

Team information
- Current team: Yverdon-Sport
- Number: 10

Youth career
- 2003–2017: Grasshopper

Senior career*
Years	Team	Apps	(Gls)
2013–2017	Grasshopper II	59	(29)
2017–2018	Grasshopper	7	(0)
2017–2018	→ Rapperswil-Jona (loan)	23	(7)
2018–2019	Lugano	6	(0)
2019–2022	Wil	90	(32)
2022–2026	Aarau	132	(54)
2026–	Yverdon-Sport	9	(2)
- * Club domestic league appearances and goals as of 20 September 2026

Valon Fazliu (born 2 February 1996) is a Swiss professional footballer who plays as an attacking midfielder for Swiss Challenge League club Yverdon-Sport.

== Professional career ==
A youth product of the Grasshopper youth academy, Fazliu signed his first professional contract on 9 August 2017 for 3 years. Fazliu made his professional debut for Grasshopper in a 1-0 Swiss Super League loss to FC Sion on 19 February 2018.

In his debut season, Fazliu was loaned to Rapperswil-Jona and scored 7 goals in 23 games. On 21 July 2018, he signed with FC Lugano keeping him at the club until 2022. On 3 September 2019, he then joined FC Wil on a contract until June 2020 with an option for a further year.

On 10 June 2022, Fazliu signed a two-year contract with Aarau. On 12 June 2024, he extended his contract for a further two years.

== Personal life ==
Born in Switzerland, Fazliu is of Kosovo Albanian descent.
