= Martin Frýdek =

Czech footballer and manager

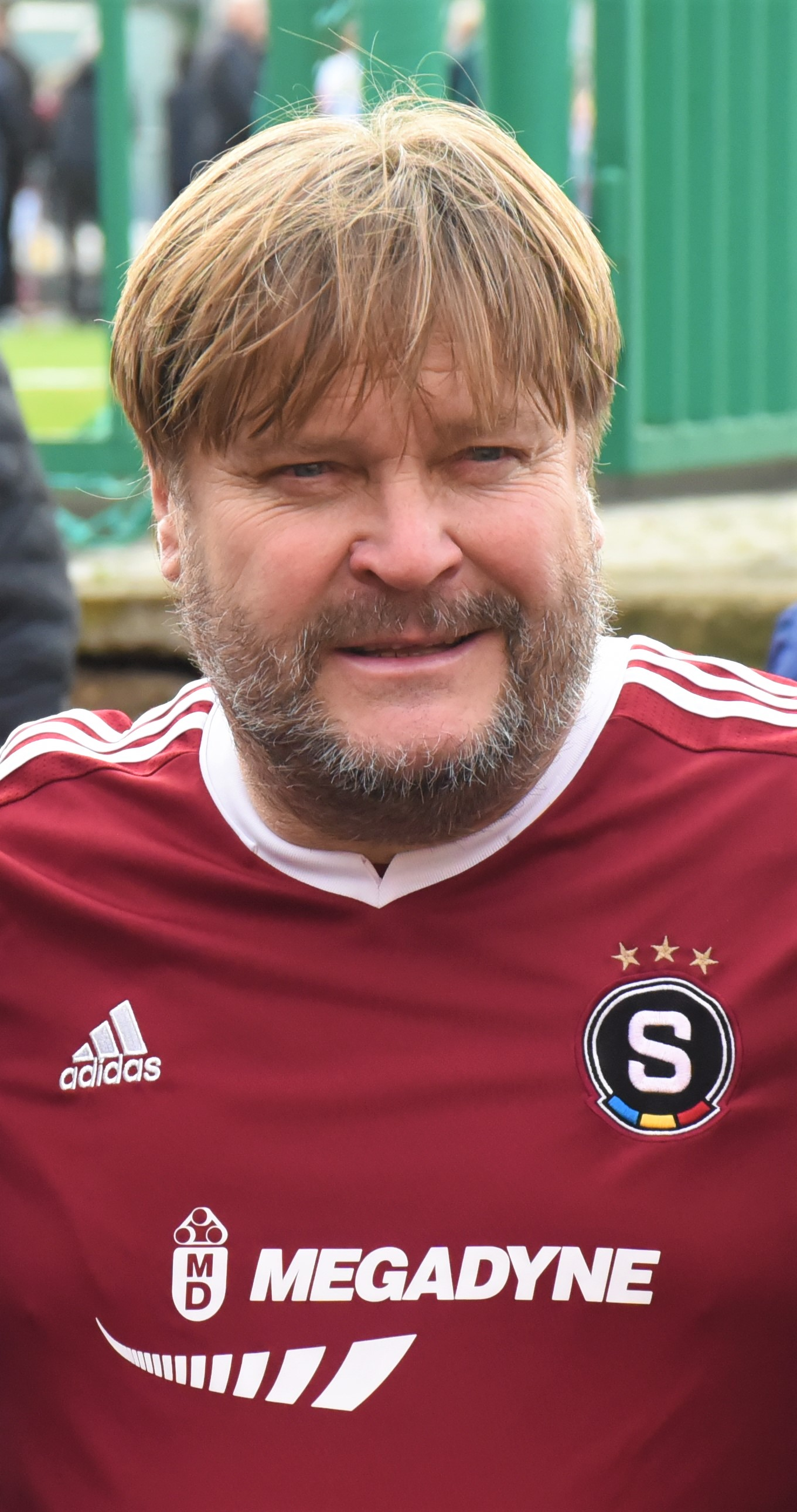
- Martin Frýdek in 2022

Personal information
- Full name: Martin Frýdek
- Date of birth: 9 March 1969 (age 57)
- Place of birth: Hradec Králové, Czechoslovakia
- Height: 1.69 m (5 ft 7 in)
- Position: Midfielder

Youth career
- 1976–1986: Spartak Hradec Králové

Senior career*
Years	Team	Apps	(Gls)
1987–1988	Agro Kolín		
1989–1990	VTJ Karlovy Vary		
1990–1997	Sparta Prague	177	(27)
1997–1998	Bayer Leverkusen	10	(0)
1998–1999	MSV Duisburg	5	(0)
1999–2001	Teplice	51	(2)
2001–2004	SC Xaverov	71	(13)
2004–2005	FK Semice		
2005	Dukla Prague		

International career
1991–1993	Czechoslovakia	8	(0)
1994–1997	Czech Republic	29	(4)

Managerial career
- 2004–2005: FK Kolín
- 2012–2013: Vlašim
- 2016–2020: Loko Vltavín
- 2021–2023: Český Brod
- 2024: Pšovka Mělník
- 2026: Maraton Pelhřimov
Medal record
Men's football
Representing Czech Republic
UEFA European Championship
Runner-up	1996 England
FIFA Confederations Cup
Third place	1997 Saudi Arabia
AC Sparta Prague
Winner	Gambrinus liga	1993–94
Winner	Gambrinus liga	1994–95
- * Club domestic league appearances and goals

Martin Frýdek (born 9 March 1969 in Hradec Králové) is a Czech football coach and former player who played as midfielder. In a seven-year international career he made a combined total of 37 appearances for the national teams of Czechoslovakia and the Czech Republic. As a player he won five national titles with Sparta Prague in the 1990s before moving to Germany, where he spent two seasons before returning to the Czech Republic, where he finished his top-flight career in 2001. He later became a football coach, having last managed division club FK Maraton Pelhřimov.

== Playing career ==
=== Club football ===
Frýdek played club football in his homeland for Sparta Prague, spending seven seasons with the club between 1990 and 1997. During this time, he was part of championship-winning sides in the 1990–91 and 1992–93 Czechoslovak First League seasons, as well as three Czech First League titles in 1993–94, 1994–95, and 1996–97. Frýdek subsequently moved to Germany, playing for Bayer Leverkusen and MSV Duisburg, but lacked playing time with the former club in favour of Emerson.

Frýdek returned to the Czech First League in the 1999–2000 season, signing for Teplice. Frýdek ceased his involvement in top-level football after the end of the 2001–02 season, and subsequently played in the Czech 2. Liga for Xaverov.

=== National teams ===
Frýdek made 37 appearances for national teams between his debut for Czechoslovakia in 1991 and his final match for the Czech Republic in 1997, scoring four goals along the way. He was a participant in the UEFA Euro 1996 where the Czech Republic won the silver medal. Frýdek was selected in the starting lineup for the team's opening match at the tournament, against Germany, ahead of Patrik Berger. He also represented his country at the 1997 FIFA Confederations Cup in Saudi Arabia, playing in the 2–1 loss against Uruguay.

== Management career ==
Frýdek was appointed coach of Vlašim ahead of the 2012–13 season. He left his position in April 2013, with the club five points above the relegation zone; he was replaced by former teammate Michal Horňák. In June 2016 Frýdek joined Loko Vltavín, he left after four years. He left his managerial role at Czech Fourth Division side Český Brod in September 2023 after poor results at the start of the 2023–24 season. In June 2024, Frýdek was appointed coach of FK Pšovka Mělník, but after series of poor results at the start of the 2024–25 season, he left the club in November 2024.

On 16 July 2026, Frýdek was appointed coach of FK Maraton Pelhřimov.

== Honours ==
Sparta Prague

- Czechoslovak First League: 1990–91, 1992–93
- Czech First League: 1993–94, 1994–95, 1996–97
