= Lavdrim Hajrulahu =

Kosovar football player (born 1998)

Personal information
- Date of birth: 7 March 1998 (age 28)
- Place of birth: Lausanne, Switzerland
- Height: 1.87 m (6 ft 2 in)
- Position: Centre-back

Team information
- Current team: Lausanne Ouchy
- Number: 5

Youth career
- –2016: Lausanne-Sport

Senior career*
| Years | Team | Apps | (Gls) |
| 2016–2017 | Lausanne-Sport U21 | 1 | (0) |
| 2017–2024 | Lausanne Ouchy | 175 | (3) |
| 2024–2026 | Neuchâtel Xamax | 59 | (1) |
| 2026– | Lausanne Ouchy | 3 | (0) |

International career^{‡}
| 2021 | Kosovo | 2 | (0) |
- * Club domestic league appearances and goals as of 20 September 2026 ‡ National team caps and goals as of 11 June 2021

Lavdrim Hajrulahu (Albanian: Hajrullahu; born 7 March 1998) is a footballer who plays as a centre-back for Swiss Challenge League club Lausanne Ouchy. Born in Switzerland, he represents the Kosovo national team.

== Club career ==
On 24 June 2024, Hajrulahu joined Swiss Challenge League side Neuchâtel Xamax.

== International career ==
On 2 June 2021, Hajrulahu received an urgent call-up from Kosovo for the friendly matches against Guinea and Gambia. Six days later, he made his debut with Kosovo in a friendly match against Guinea after coming on as a substitute at 46th minute in place of Bajram Jashanica.
