= Yverdon-Sport FC =

Swiss football club

Yverdon-Sport
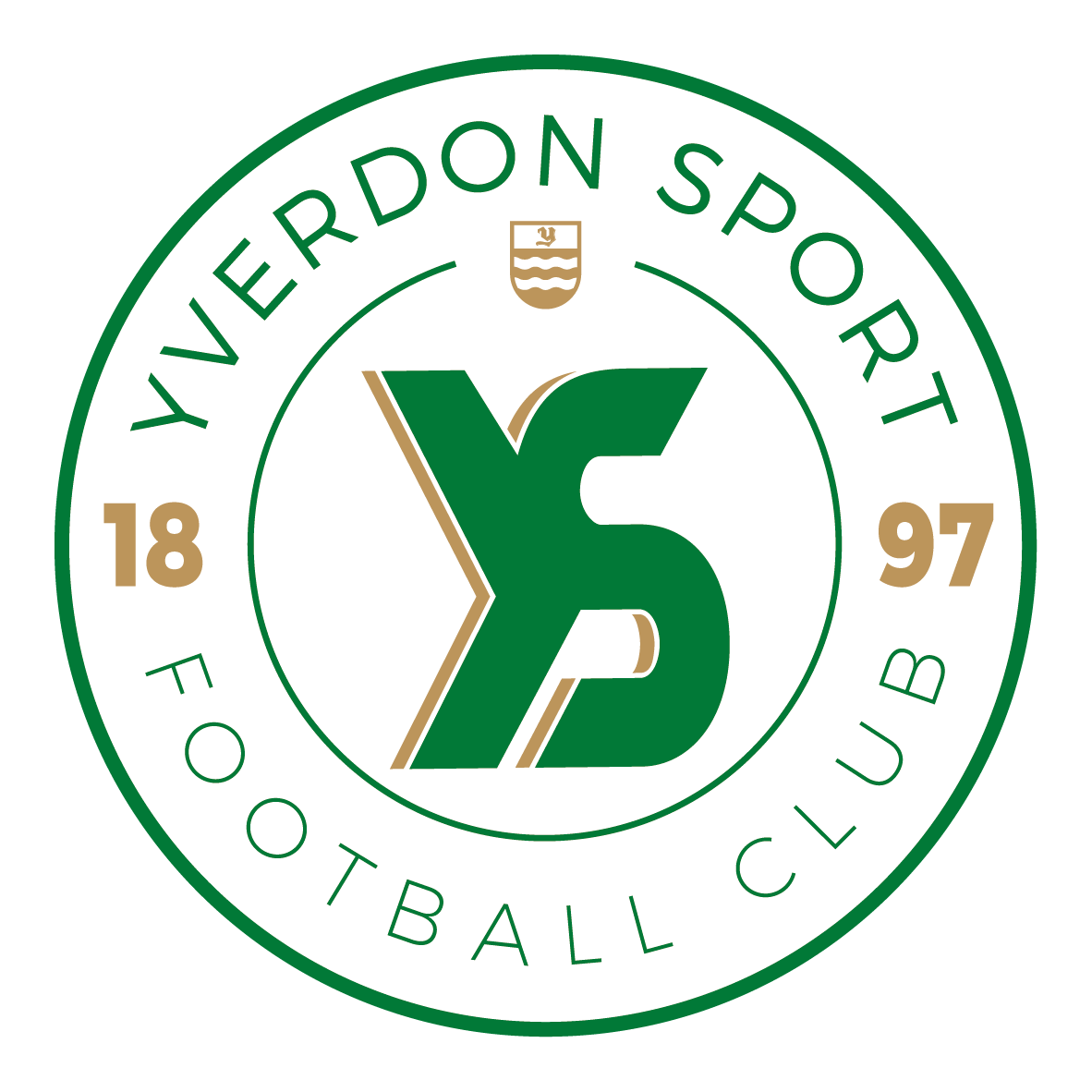
- Full name: Yverdon-Sport Football Club
- Founded: 1897; 129 years ago
- Ground: Stade Municipal
- Capacity: 6,600 (1,000 seated)
- Chairman: Jeffrey Saunders
- Manager: Vacant
- League: Challenge League
- 2024–25: Super League, 12th of 12 (relegated)
- Website: yverdonsport.ch
Home colours	Away colours

Yverdon-Sport FC is a Swiss football club based in Yverdon-les-Bains that competes in the Challenge League, the second tier of Swiss football. The club plays its home matches at the Stade Municipal.

== History ==
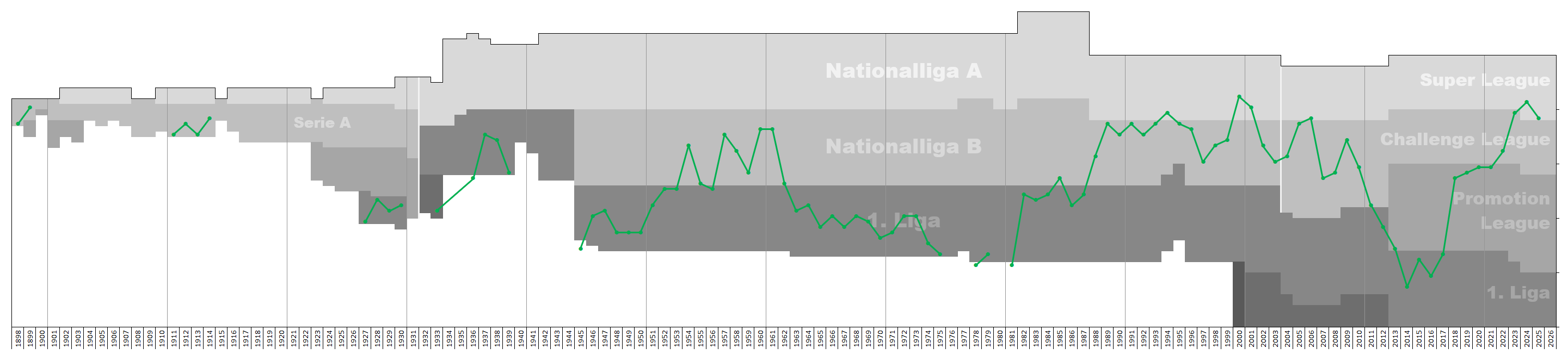
Chart of Yverdon-Sport table positions in the Swiss football league system

The club Yverdon-Sport came about in 1948, due to the merger of FC Yverdon (originally founded in 1897), (agreed at the AGM of 20 July 1948) of FC Concordia (agreed at the AGM of 14 July 1948) and of White Star (agreed at the AGM of 14 July 1948) on the basis of a merger project that was drawn up by a Study Committee that was formed by the authorized delegates of the three clubs on Saturday, 10 July 1948.

Yverdon-Sport played in the Swiss Super League following promotions in 1993, 1995, 2005 and 2023. In 1996 and 2024 they avoided immediate relegation out of the league. The club reached the final of the 2000–01 Swiss Cup but finished as runners-up after losing 3–0 to Servette. In July 2017, after winning promotion to the third-tier Swiss Promotion League, the club signed former France international striker Djibril Cissé.

On 23 May 2023, Yverdon-Sport secured promotion to the Super League, after drawing against FC Aarau 1–1, thus returning to the top tier for the first time since 2005–06. The 2023–24 season was their fifth season in the highest Swiss football league. Three days later, Yverdon-Sport were crowned champions of the 2022–23 Swiss Challenge League after defeating FC Wil 2–0 on the last matchday.

On 22 May 2025, Yverdon Sport was relegated to the Challenge League. On the final matchday, even a 3–2 win against FC Zurich was not enough.

== Stadium ==
Yverdon-Sport began the 2023–24 season at the Stade de la Maladière in Neuchatel, while two months of reconstruction work was carried out at Stade Municipal. In September 2023 they returned to their home stadium, Stade Municipal.

== Honours ==
- Challenge League
  - Winners (6): 1988–89, 1990–91, 1992–93, 1994–95, 2004–05, 2022–23
  - Runners-up (1): 1998–99
- Swiss Cup
  - Runners-up (1): 2000–01

== Current squad ==
As of 28 September 2026

Note: Flags indicate national team as defined under FIFA eligibility rules; some limited exceptions apply. Players may hold more than one non-FIFA nationality.

No.	Pos.	Nation	Player
1	GK	SUI	Simon Enzler
3	DF	SUI	Loan Guignard
4	MF	CIV	Ousmane Doumbia
5	DF	CIV	Jason Gnakpa
6	DF	GLP	Anthony Baron
7	FW	FRA	Mahamadou Kanouté
8	MF	SUI	Aurélien Chappuis
9	FW	KOS	Shkelqim Demhasaj
10	MF	SUI	Valon Fazliu
11	MF	SUI	Elias Pasche
14	MF	COL	Jonatan Mayorga
16	GK	SUI	Maxime Rouiller

No.	Pos.	Nation	Player
17	FW	FRA	Jean-Kévin Augustin
18	DF	NOR	Vegard Kongsro
19	FW	SUI	Hélios Sessolo
20	FW	GER	Varol Tasar
23	DF	SUI	Lorenzo Bittarelli
24	MF	SUI	Bastien Toma
25	DF	CAN	Lucas Pos
26	FW	SUI	Robin Golliard
32	DF	SUI	Anthony Sauthier (captain)
66	MF	SUI	Mayka Okuka
71	DF	SUI	Gilles Richard (on loan from Sion)
80	MF	SUI	Ethan Bruchez (on loan from Lausanne-Sport)

== Coaching staff ==
For the 2025–26 season.

Position	Staff
Manager	Martin Andermatt
Assistant Manager	Attila Malfatti; Giuseppe Rossi
Technical Director	Filippo Giovagnoli
Goalkeeper Coach	Pedro Soares
Video Analyst	André Santos
Fitness Coach	Romain Tanniger
Physiotherapist	Ermanno Speranza; Massimo Inglese
Masseur	Nicolas Rouilly
Kit Manager	Nicolas Duvoisin
Nutritionalist	Océane Poncet
Doctor	Luca Tolosano
Steward	Ana Maria Mondaca
Assistant Fitness Coach	Vincenzo Chine
