= FC Stade Lausanne Ouchy =

Swiss football club

Stade Lausanne Ouchy
- Full name: Football Club Stade Lausanne Ouchy
- Founded: 1901; 125 years ago
- Stadium: Stade Olympique de la Pontaise
- Capacity: 15,700
- Owner: Franck Muller Group Watchland SA
- Chairman: Vartan Sirmakes
- Manager: Dalibor Stevanović
- League: Swiss Challenge League
- 2025–26: 4th of 10
- Website: fcslo.ch
Home colours	Away colours

FC Stade Lausanne Ouchy, sometimes referred to as SLO, is a Swiss professional football club based in Ouchy, Lausanne. They have played in the Swiss Challenge League since 2024, following relegation from the Swiss Super League.

== History ==
The club is the result of a merger between FC Ouchy-Olympic and FC Stade Lausanne in 2001.

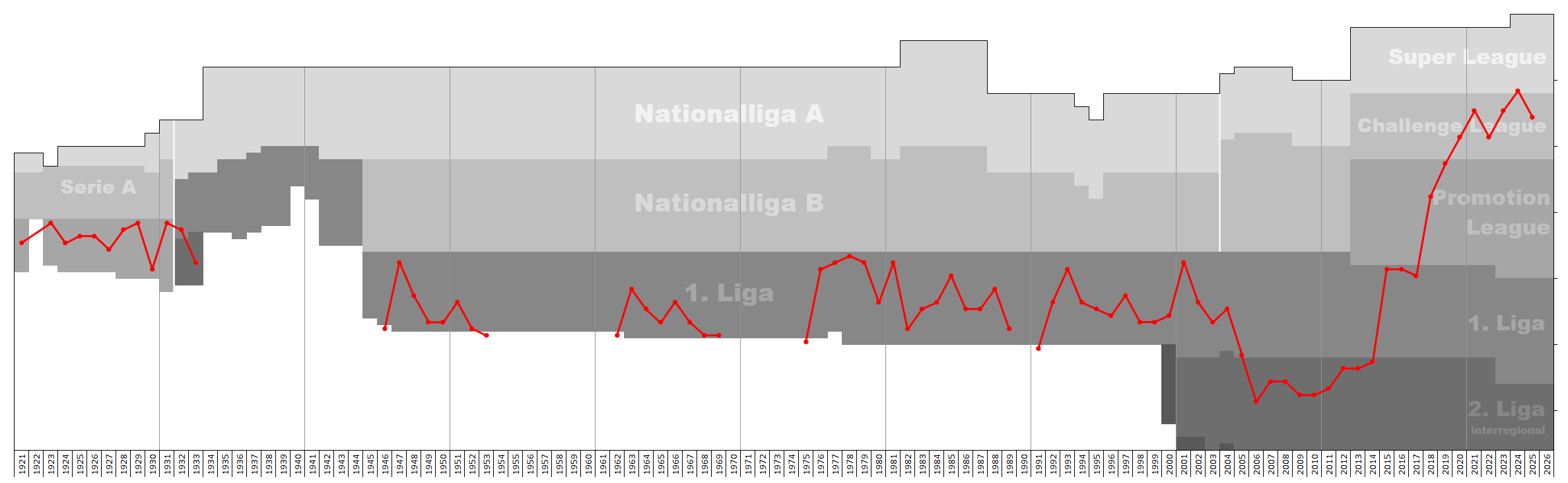
Table rankings of Stade Lausanne-Ouchy in the Swiss football league system

FC Ouchy-Olympic's story began in 1895 as FC La Villa Ouchy. As founding members of the Swiss Football Association, they competed in the first Serie A season in 1897–98, but later mostly played in the lower divisions. The initial forerunner to the latter club was founded in 1901 as FC Signal Lausanne, which became Stade Lausanne in 1926, also introducing athletics, field hockey and shooting sports departments. They competed in the second division and narrowly failed to achieve promotion to Serie A in 1929. Henri Guisan acted as president between 1929 and 1939, when his position became honorary as he led the Swiss Army's mobilization during World War II. He emphasized the importance of sport to stay healthy, for civilians but especially soldiers. They continued to compete in the lower divisions following his departure, playing in the 1. Liga as late as 1963–64.

After the two clubs combined, they were eventually promoted to the 2. Liga Interregional in 2005, where they stayed until 2014. They reached the Promotion League by 2017, and had a notable cup run in the 2017–18 season, beating first division side FC Sion to reach the round of 16. After promotion to the Challenge League, the club was forced to relocate outside the city to Nyon as their previous pitch failed to meet the requirements for professional football, but now play at Stade Olympique de la Pontaise.

At the end of a strong 2022–23 season, most of which was spent in the top half of the table, they managed to jump to third place in the final rounds and qualified for the promotion play-off against FC Sion. They won the first leg in Sion 2–0 and the second leg at home 4–2 and thus, with an aggregate score of 6–2, secured promotion to the Super League for the first time in their history. Their stay in the Swiss top flight would prove to be a short one, as the club was relegated at the end of the season as the last placed team. On 19 April 2026, Stade Lausanne Ouchy reached the Swiss Cup final for the first time, after defeating Grasshopper of Super League 2–0 in the semi-final.

== Stadium ==
Stade Lausanne Ouchy have played at Stade Olympique de la Pontaise since 2020.

== Honours ==
- Swiss Challenge League
  - Promotion Play-off Winner: 2023
- Swiss Promotion League
  - Winners (1): 2019

== Players ==
=== Current squad ===
As of 27 September 2026

Note: Flags indicate national team as defined under FIFA eligibility rules; some limited exceptions apply. Players may hold more than one non-FIFA nationality.

No.	Pos.	Nation	Player
1	GK	SUI	Dany da Silva
2	DF	SUI	Julen Carrasco
3	DF	SUI	Bastien Conus
4	DF	MAR	Djamal Moussadek
5	DF	SUI	Lavdrim Hajrulahu
7	MF	FRA	Théo Bouchlarhem
8	MF	SUI	Néhemie Lusuena
10	MF	FRA	Ronaldo Freitas
11	FW	SUI	Malko Sartoretti
12	FW	CAN	Ayo Akinola
14	FW	FRA	François Mendy
19	FW	ESP	Cobel Sow García (on loan from Basel)
20	FW	SUI	Jonathan Dula
21	GK	SUI	Kevin Martin

No.	Pos.	Nation	Player
22	DF	FRA	Théo Barbet
25	MF	NGR	Johan Nkama
28	DF	SUI	Issa Kaloga
30	MF	SUI	Ronaldo Dantas Fernandes (on loan from Luzern)
34	DF	SUI	Nicola Sutter
44	DF	SUI	Hénoc Lukembila
45	FW	SUI	Jamie Atangana (on loan from Servette)
47	MF	SUI	Fabio Morello
50	GK	KOS	Laurent Seji
57	FW	RWA	Noam Emeran
77	MF	SUI	Vasco Tritten
80	MF	ESP	Jordi Tur
94	FW	FRA	Loïc Socka Bongué

=== On loan ===
Note: Flags indicate national team as defined under FIFA eligibility rules; some limited exceptions apply. Players may hold more than one non-FIFA nationality.

No.	Pos.	Nation	Player
—	MF	SUI	Mattéo Djoumgoué (at USI Azzurri until 30 June 2027)
—	MF	ITA	Luca Gelato (at Bulle until 30 June 2027)

No.	Pos.	Nation	Player
—	FW	FRA	Exaucé Mafoumbi (at Bulle until 30 June 2027)

== Notable former employees ==
- Richard Dürr, Swiss international capped 29 times, worked as player, manager, and president of Stade Lausanne
- Norbert Eschmann, Swiss international capped 15 times, played in the youth team 1949–50
- Henri Guisan, acted as president 1929–1939
- Blaise Nkufo, played in the youth teams 1988–1992

== Coaching staff ==
As of 13 November 2023

Position	Name
Head Coach	(Slovenia) Dalibor Stevanović
Assistant Head Coach	(Portugal) Manuel Pereira
Goalkeeper Coach	(Portugal) Carlos Manguinho
Fitness Coach	(Portugal) António Conceição
Assistant Fitness Coach	(Portugal) José Gaspar
Video Analyst	(Portugal) Ernesto Folha
Physiotherapist	(Portugal) Tiago Rebocho (Portugal) Nuno Gonçalves
Team Manager	(Portugal) Rui Gouveia
