= 2020–21 Servette FC season =

Servette FC
2020–21 season
- Owner: 1890 Foundation
- Chairman: Didier Fischer
- Manager: Alain Geiger
- Stadium: Stade de Genève
- Swiss Super League: 3rd
- Swiss Cup: Semi-finals
- UEFA Europa League: Second qualifying round
Home colours	Away colours

The 2020–21 Servette FC season was the club's 131st season in existence and the second consecutive season in the top flight of Swiss football. In addition to the domestic league, Servette participated in this season's editions of the Swiss Cup and the UEFA Europa League. The season covered the period from 20 September 2020 to 30 June 2021.

== Season overview ==
On Monday 31 August 2020 the Swiss Football League (SFL) published the schedule for the Raiffeisen Super League 2020–21. Servette start the new season on Sunday 20 September with an away game against Lausanne-Sport. In a first step, the SFL published the schedule for the first 18 rounds, but only fixed times for the first nine rounds. The final schedule with the further 18 games in the second half of the season will follow by the end of the year.

== Players ==
=== First-team squad ===
As of 24 January 2020

Note: Flags indicate national team as defined under FIFA eligibility rules; some limited exceptions apply. Players may hold more than one non-FIFA nationality.

No.	Pos.	Nation	Player
1	GK	COD	Joël Kiassumbua
2	DF	SUI	Anthony Sauthier
3	DF	FRA	Christopher Routis
4	DF	SUI	Steve Rouiller
5	MF	SUI	Boris Céspedes
8	MF	FRA	Timothé Cognat
9	MF	BIH	Miroslav Stevanović
11	FW	NED	Alex Schalk
14	MF	ITA	Andrea Maccoppi
15	DF	SUI	Michael Gonçalves
17	MF	SUI	Kastriot Imeri
18	FW	CIV	Koro Kone
19	DF	FRA	Yoan Severin

No.	Pos.	Nation	Player
20	FW	GER	Varol Tasar
21	DF	SUI	Dennis Iapichino
22	MF	SUI	Ricardo Azevedo
23	DF	FRA	Vincent Sasso
25	FW	FRA	Grejohn Kyei
26	GK	SUI	Joao Castanheira
29	MF	CMR	Gaël Ondoua
32	GK	SUI	Jérémy Frick
39	MF	FRA	Alexis Martial
40	MF	SUI	Noah Henchoz
42	DF	SUI	Lucas Monteiro
46	MF	FRA	Matteo Mazzolini

=== Out on loan ===
Note: Flags indicate national team as defined under FIFA eligibility rules; some limited exceptions apply. Players may hold more than one non-FIFA nationality.

No. / Pos. / Nation / Player; 27 / MF / SUI / Alexis Antunes (at FC Chiasso until 30 June 2020)	No. / Pos. / Nation / Player; 33 / DF / SUI / Robin Busset (at SC Kriens until 30 June 2020)

== Pre-season and friendlies ==
Win Draw Loss

21 August 2020 Friendly	Servette (Switzerland)	8–0	(France) Thonon Évian
18:30 CEST (UTC+2)		Report

22 August 2020 Friendly	Neuchâtel Xamax (Switzerland)	1–2	(Switzerland) Servette	Bouveret
17:30 CEST (UTC+2)		Report		Stadium: Stade du Bouveret

13 January 2021 Friendly	Servette (Switzerland)	0–1	(Switzerland) Stade Lausanne Ouchy	Lausanne
14:00 CET (UTC+1)		Report		Stadium: Stade de Vidy Synthétique

== Competitions ==
=== Overview ===
Competition	First match	Last match	Starting round	Final position	Record							
Competition	First match	Last match	Starting round	Final position	Pld	W	D	L	GF	GA	GD	Win %
Swiss Super League	20 September 2020	21 May 2021	Matchday 1	3rd	36	14	8	14	45	56	−11	38.89
Swiss Cup	7 April 2021	5 May 2021	Round 3	Semi-finals	3	2	0	1	7	5	+2	66.67
Europa League	27 August 2020	17 September 2020	First qualifying round	Second qualifying round	2	1	0	1	3	1	+2	50.00
Total					41	17	8	16	55	62	−7	41.46

Source: Soccerway

=== Swiss Super League ===
==== League table ====
Pos	Team	Pld	W	D	L	GF	GA	GD	Pts	Qualification or relegation
1	Young Boys (C)	36	25	9	2	74	29	+45	84	Qualification for the Champions League second qualifying round
2	Basel	36	15	8	13	60	53	+7	53	Qualification for the Europa Conference League second qualifying round
3	Servette	36	14	8	14	45	56	−11	50	Qualification for the Europa Conference League second qualifying round
4	Lugano	36	12	13	11	40	42	−2	49	
5	Luzern	36	12	10	14	62	59	+3	46	Qualification for the Europa Conference League third qualifying round (Note: Luzern qualified for the Europa Conference League third qualifying round as winners of the 2020–21 Swiss Cup.)

Source: Swiss Super League
Rules for classification: 1) Points; 2) Goal difference; 3) Goals scored; 4) Head-to-head goal difference; 5) Away goals scored; 6) Draw.
(C) Champions

==== Results summary ====
Overall								Home						Away					
Pld	W	D	L	GF	GA	GD	Pts	W	D	L	GF	GA	GD	W	D	L	GF	GA	GD
36	14	8	14	45	56	−11	50	6	7	5	28	29	−1	8	1	9	17	27	−10

Last updated: 21 May 2021.
Source: Soccerway

==== Results by round ====
Round	1
Ground	
Result	
Position	

Updated to match(es) played on August 2020. Source:
A = Away; H = Home; W = Win; D = Draw; L = Loss

==== Matches ====
20 September 2020 1	Lausanne-Sport	2 – 1	Servette	Olympique de la Pontaise, Lausanne
16:00	Turkeš 17'; Nanizayamo (yellow card) 52'; Schneuwly 59'; Cameron Puertas (yellow card) 82'	Report	Cognat (yellow card) 13'; Ondoua (yellow card) 57'; Kyei 83' (pen.)	Attendance: 1,000; Referee: (Switzerland) Léonce Lionel Tschudi

27 September 2020 2	Servette	1 – 0	Basel	Stade de Genève, Geneva
16:00	Cespedes (yellow card) 13'; Stevanović (yellow card) 51'; Schalk 77' (pen.)	SFL summary	(yellow card) 7' Bunjaku; (red card) 30' van der Werff; (yellow card) 59' van Wolfswinkel; (yellow card) 61' Nikolić	Attendance: 1,000; Referee: (Switzerland) Luca Piccolo

4 October 2020 3	St. Gallen	1 – 0	Servette	Kybunpark, St. Gallen
16:00	Görtler (yellow card) 4'; Duah 24'; Fazliji (yellow card) 25'; Stillhart (yellow card) 42'; Ati-Zigi (yellow card) 90+3'	Report	Sauthier (yellow card) 36'; Sasso (yellow card) 44'; Mendy (yellow card) 45'; Stevanović (yellow card) 59'; Frick (yellow card) 61'	Attendance: 9,244; Referee: (Switzerland) Urs Schnyder

17 October 2020 4	Servette	0 – 0	Young Boys	Stade de Genève, Geneva
19:00	Fofana (yellow card) 30' (yellow-red card) 39'; Céspedes (yellow card) 66'	Report	Sierro (yellow card) 63' (yellow-red card) 66'; Lefort (yellow card) 81'	Attendance: 5,240; Referee: (Switzerland) Lukas Fähndrich

22 November 2020 8	Servette	1 – 1	Lugano	Stade de Genève, Geneva
16:00	Kyei 38'; Koné (yellow card) 75'; Ondoua (yellow card) 88'	Report	Gerndt (yellow card) 35'; Kecskés (yellow card) 47'; Lavanchy 63'; Custodio (yellow card) 84'	Attendance: 0 Referee: (Switzerland) Alessandro Dudic
Note: COVID-19 pandemic in Switzerland

25 November 2020 5	Sion	2 – 0	Servette	Stade Tourbillon, Sion
18:15	Tosetti (yellow card) 10'; Bamert 15'; Khasa 58'; Iapichino (yellow card) 67'	Report	Céspedes (yellow card) 70'	Attendance: 0 Referee: (Switzerland) Léonce Lionel Tschudi
Note: COVID-19 pandemic in Switzerland

28 November 2020 9	Servette	1 – 3	Luzern	Stade de Genève, Geneva
20:30	Diallo (yellow card) 16'; Mendy (yellow card) 49'; Rouiller 77'; Koné (yellow card) 90+3'	Report	Schaub 23'; Sorgić (yellow card) 35' (goal) 67'; Knezevic (yellow card) 37'; Sidler (yellow card) 69'; Ndiaye 79'; Müller (yellow card) 90+3'	Attendance: 0 Referee: (Switzerland) Fedayi San
Note: COVID-19 pandemic in Switzerland

2 December 2020 6	Servette	2 – 1	Zürich	Stade de Genève, Geneva
18:15	Kyei (yellow card) 60' (goal) 69'; Ondoua (yellow card) 79'; Valls 90+4'	Report	Domgjoni 74'	Attendance: 0 Referee: (Switzerland) Sandro Schärer
Note: COVID-19 pandemic in Switzerland

5 December 2020 10	Basel	1 – 0	Servette	St. Jakob-Park, Basel
20:30	Widmer (yellow card) 11'; Kasami 51'; Arthur Cabral (yellow card) 63'; Klose (yellow card) 74'; Frei (yellow card) 79'	Report	Kyei (yellow card) 19'; Ondoua (yellow card) 42'; Sauthier (yellow card) 45+2'; Imeri (yellow card) 79'; Valls (yellow card) 85'	Attendance: 0 Referee: (Switzerland) Alessandro Dudic
Note: COVID-19 pandemic in Switzerland

9 December 2020 7	Vaduz	0 – 2	Servette	Rheinpark Stadion, Vaduz
18:15	Schmid (yellow card) 27'; Simani (yellow card) 31'; Gajić (yellow card) 61'	Report	Sauthier (yellow card) 16'; Stevanović 27'; Kyei 49'	Attendance: 0 Referee: (Switzerland) Luca Piccolo
Note: COVID-19 pandemic in Switzerland

13 December 2020 11	Young Boys	1–2	Servette	Stadion Wankdorf, Bern
16:00	Maceiras (yellow card) 54'; Mambimbi 85'	SFL summary	22' Schalk; 65' Schalk	Attendance: 5 Referee: (Switzerland) Stefan Horisberger

17 December 2020 12	Servette	1 – 1	Sion	Stade de Genève, Geneva
20:30	Céspedes (yellow card) 10'; Rouiller (yellow card) 37'; Severin (yellow card) 41'; Fofana 71'; Azevedo (yellow card) 90+5'	Report	Grgić 15'; Uldriķis (yellow card) 29'; Theler (yellow card) 45'; Ndoye (red card) 61'; Zock (yellow card) 77'	Attendance: 0 Referee: (Switzerland) Adrien Jaccottet
Note: COVID-19 pandemic in Switzerland

20 December 2020 13	Zürich	0 – 1	Servette	Letzigrund, Zürich
16:00	Tosin (yellow card) 31'; Ceesay (yellow card) 50'	Report	Kyei (yellow card) 18'; Ondoua (yellow card) 36'; Vouilloz (yellow card) 73'; Sauthier (yellow card) 79'; Cognat 85'	Attendance: 0 Referee: (Switzerland) Lukas Fähndrich
Note: COVID-19 pandemic in Switzerland

23 December 2020 14	Servette	1–1	Vaduz	Stade de Genève, Geneva
18:15	Kyei 58' (pen.) (yellow card) 61'; Céspedes (yellow card) 90+1'	Report	Simani (yellow card) 24'; Gasser (yellow card) 50'; Obexer (yellow card) 56'; Wieser (yellow card) 87'	Attendance: 0 Referee: (Switzerland) Urs Schnyder
Note: COVID-19 pandemic in Switzerland

31 January 2021 17	Servette	1–1	Lausanne-Sport	Stade de Genève, Geneva
16:00	Sauthier (yellow card) 14'; Schalk 75'	Report	Guessand 21'; Boranijašević (yellow card) 22'; Jenz (yellow card) 51'; Elton Monteiro (yellow card) 54' (yellow-red card) 66'; Cameron Puertas (yellow card) 55'; Diaw (yellow card) 84'	Attendance: 0 Referee: (Switzerland) Fedayi San
Note: COVID-19 pandemic in Switzerland

4 February 2021 18	Luzern	3–0	Servette	Swissporarena, Luzern
18:15	Grether (yellow card) 5'; Sorgić 45+3'; Schulz 56' 72' (pen.); Schwegler (yellow card) 57'	Report	Fofana (yellow card) 36'; Céspedes (yellow card) 54'; Diallo (yellow card) 71'; Imeri (yellow card) 78' (yellow-red card) 78'	Attendance: 0 Referee: (Switzerland) Stefan Horisberger
Note: COVID-19 pandemic in Switzerland

7 February 2021 19	Servette	4–2	Luzern	Stade de Genève, Geneva
16:00	Fofana (yellow card) 2' (goal) 11'; Kyei 18' (yellow card) 28'; Céspedes (yellow card) 22' (goal) 67'; Rouiller 54'; Severin (yellow card) 69'	Report	Schaub 8'; Schwegler (yellow card) 33'; Zibung (yellow card) 39'; Knezevic (yellow card) 54'; Schulz 75'; Emini (yellow card) 84'	Attendance: 0 Referee: (Switzerland) Alain Bieri
Note: COVID-19 pandemic in Switzerland

10 February 2021 15	Servette	2–2	St. Gallen	Stade de Genève, Geneva
18:15 CET				Attendance: 0
Note: COVID-19 pandemic in Switzerland

13 February 2021 20	Lausanne-Sport	3–1	Servette	Stade de la Tuilière, Lausanne
18:15
Note: COVID-19 pandemic in Switzerland

21 February 2021 21	Young Boys	2–0	Servette	Stadion Wankdorf, Bern
16:00
Note: COVID-19 pandemic in Switzerland

27 February 2021 22	Servette	3–1	Zürich	Stade de Genève, Geneva
18:15	Rouiller (yellow card) 19'; Miroslav Stevanović 26'; Valls (yellow card) 45+1'; Miroslav Stevanović 62'; Valls 67' (pen.)	SFL summary	12' Fabian Rohner; (yellow card) 54' Brecher; (yellow card) 56' Khelifi; (yellow card) 66' H. Kryeziu	Attendance: 5 Referee: (Switzerland) Luca Piccolo
Note: COVID-19 pandemic in Switzerland

3 March 2021 23	St. Gallen	0–1	Servette	Kybunpark, St. Gallen
18:15
Note: COVID-19 pandemic in Switzerland

6 March 2021 24	Servette	2–1	Basel	Stade de Genève, Geneva
20:30	Severin (yellow card) 39'; Kyei 62'; Ondoua 71'	SFL report	(yellow card) 49' Cardoso; 90+3' Cabral	Attendance: 0 Referee: (Switzerland) Alessandro Dudic
Note: COVID-19 pandemic in Switzerland

14 March 2021 25	Sion	1–2	Servette	Stade Tourbillon, Sion
16:00
Note: COVID-19 pandemic in Switzerland

21 March 2021 26	Servette	1–2	Vaduz	Stade de Genève, Geneva
16:00	Ondoua (yellow card) 63'; Sauthier (yellow card) 75'; Kyei 76'; Sasso (yellow card) 90'	SFL report	(yellow card) 25' Gasser; 28' Dorn; 50' Di Giusto; (yellow card) 63' Simani; (yellow card) 64' Lüchinger; (yellow card) 89' Sutter	Attendance: 0 Referee: (Switzerland) Stefan Horisberger

4 April 2021 27	Servette	1–1	Lugano	Stade de Genève, Geneva
16:00

11 April 2021 28	Zürich	1–2	Servette	Letzigrund, Zürich
16:00	Džemaili (yellow card) 38'; Domgjoni (yellow card) 40'; Schönbächler 85'	SFL summary	(yellow card) 20' Céspedes; 46' Schalk; (yellow card) 50' Schalk; 69' Imeri} (yellow card) 83' Fofana; (yellow card) 90+5' Severin

18 April 2021 29	Basel	5–0	Servette	St. Jakob-Park, Basel
16:00	Frei 3' (pen.); Kasami 6' van Wolfswinkel 9'; Zhegrova (yellow card) 46'; Pululu 86'; Pululu 87'	SFL summary	(yellow card) 26' Diallo; (red card) 35' Sauthier	Attendance: 0 Referee: (Switzerland)

22 April 2021 30	Servette	3–5	Sion	Stade de Genève, Geneva

25 April 2021 31	Lugano	0–1	Servette	Cornaredo, Lugano

2 May 2021 32	Servette	2–1	Young Boys	Stade de Genève, Geneva
16:00	Cognat (yellow card) 33'; Schalk (yellow card) 36'; Fofana 76'; Koné 82'	SFL summary	90' Ngamaleu; (yellow card) 90+1' Garcia	Attendance: 100; Referee: (Switzerland) Alain Bieri

9 May 2021 33	Luzern	3–0	Servette	Swissporarena, Luzern

12 May 2021 34	Servette	1–4	Lausanne-Sport	Stade de Genève, Geneva

15 May 2021 35	Vaduz	1–3	Servette	Rheinpark Stadion, Vaduz
16:00

21 May 2021 36	Servette	1–2	St. Gallen	Stade de Genève, Geneva
20:00

=== Swiss Cup ===
7 April 2021 Third Round	Vevey Sports	2–4	Servette	Vevey
18:00 CET	Kyei 17' (o.g.); Roberto Elefante (yellow card) 52'; Marco Gabriele (yellow card) 58'; Oumar Diop (yellow card) 66'; Iúri Simão 81'; Lionel Zouma (yellow card) 90+3'	Report	Stevanović 57'; Kyei 65'; Severin (yellow card) 67'; Imeri 85' (pen.) 90+2' (pen.)	Stadium: Stade de Copet; Attendance: 0 Referee: (Switzerland) Alessandro Dudic

14 April 2021 Quarter Final	Kriens	2–3 (a.e.t.)	Servette	Kriens
17:00 CET	David Mistrafovic 24' (yellow card) 30'; Ulrich (yellow card) 65'; Marleku (yellow card) 72'; Busset (yellow card) 75'; Sessolo 78'; Urtić (yellow card) 120+1'	Report	Cognat 68'; Kyei 84'; Ondoua 108'	Stadium: Stadion Kleinfeld; Attendance: 0 Referee: Nikolaj Hänni

5 May 2021 Semi Final	Servette	0–1	St. Gallen	Geneva
17:00 CET	Kyei (yellow card) 24'; Ondoua (yellow card) 75'; Sauthier (yellow card) 88'; Sasso (yellow card) 90+5'	Report	Stillhart (yellow card) 12' (goal) 83'; Guillemenot (yellow card) 18'	Stadium: Stade de Genève; Attendance: 0 Referee: Adrien Jaccottet

=== UEFA Europa League ===
27 August 2020 First qualifying round	Servette (Switzerland)	3–0	(Slovakia) Ružomberok	Geneva
20:15 CEST (UTC+2)	Stevanović 54'; Mendy 77'; Antunes 86'	Report		Stadium: Stade de Genève; Attendance: 0 Referee: Viktor Kopiievskyi (Ukraine)

17 September 2020 Second qualifying round	Servette (Switzerland)	0–1	(France) Reims	Geneva
20:45 CEST (UTC+2)		Report	Berisha 4'; Chavalerin (yellow card) 43'; Moreto Cassamá (yellow card) 45'; Faes (yellow card) 67'; Touré (yellow card) 83'	Stadium: Stade de Genève; Attendance: 0 Referee: (England) Stuart Attwell
