= 2021–22 Servette FC season =

Servette
2021–22 season
- Chairman: Didier Fischer
- Manager: Alain Geiger
- Stadium: Stade de Genève
- Swiss Super League: 6th
- Swiss Cup: Round 3
- UEFA Europa Conference League: Second qualifying round
- Top goalscorer: League: Kastriot Imeri (11); All: Kastriot Imeri (12)
Home colours	Away colours

The 2021–22 season was the 132nd season in the existence of Servette FC and the club's third consecutive season in the top flight of Swiss football. In addition to the domestic league, Servette participated in this season's editions of the Swiss Cup and the UEFA Europa Conference League.

== Players ==
=== First-team squad ===
As of 31 January 2022

Note: Flags indicate national team as defined under FIFA eligibility rules; some limited exceptions apply. Players may hold more than one non-FIFA nationality.

No.	Pos.	Nation	Player
1	GK	SUI	Steven Deana
3	DF	FRA	Gaël Clichy
4	DF	SUI	Steve Rouiller
5	MF	BOL	Boris Céspedes
7	DF	FRA	Moussa Diallo
8	MF	FRA	Timothé Cognat
9	MF	BIH	Miroslav Stevanović
10	FW	NED	Alex Schalk
11	FW	FRA	Boubacar Fofana
12	FW	FRA	Ronny Rodelin
14	FW	SUI	Dimitri Oberlin
15	MF	FRA	Theo Valls
17	MF	SUI	Kastriot Imeri
18	FW	CIV	Chris Bedia
19	DF	FRA	Yoan Severin

No.	Pos.	Nation	Player
20	MF	GBS	Papu Mendes
21	FW	SUI	Nils Pédat
22	MF	SUI	Ricardo Azevedo
23	DF	FRA	Vincent Sasso
24	DF	SUI	Malik Sawadogo
26	DF	AUT	Moritz Bauer
27	MF	SUI	Alexis Antunes
28	MF	FRA	David Douline
30	DF	SUI	Noah Henchoz
32	GK	SUI	Jérémy Frick
33	DF	SUI	Nicolas Vouilloz
34	DF	SUI	Roggerio Nyakossi
35	DF	POR	Diogo Monteiro
40	GK	SUI	Edin Omeragic

=== Out on loan ===
Note: Flags indicate national team as defined under FIFA eligibility rules; some limited exceptions apply. Players may hold more than one non-FIFA nationality.

No.	Pos.	Nation	Player
—	DF	SUI	Mathis Magnin (at Étoile Carouge)
—	DF	SUI	Lucas Monteiro (at Nyonnais)

No.	Pos.	Nation	Player
—	DF	SUI	Anthony Sauthier (at Yverdon-Sport)
—	FW	SUI	Matteo Regillo (at Étoile Carouge)

== Pre-season and friendlies ==
Win Draw Loss Fixtures

3 July 2021 Friendly	Servette (Switzerland)	2–2	(Switzerland) Neuchâtel Xamax	Crans-Montana, Switzerland
17:00 CEST (UTC+2)				Stadium: Stade de la Moubra

7 July 2021 Friendly	Yverdon (Switzerland)	1–0	(Switzerland) Servette	Yverdon-les-Bains, Switzerland
18:00 CEST (UTC+2)				Stadium: Stade Municipal

10 July 2021 Friendly	Servette (Switzerland)	1–1	(Ukraine) Dynamo Kyiv	Meyrin, Switzerland
20:00 CEST (UTC+2)	Imeri 13'		Shkurin 85'	Stadium: Stade des Arbères

15 July 2021 Friendly	Marseille (France)	3–1	(Switzerland) Servette	Fos-sur-Mer, France
21:00 CEST (UTC+2)	Gerson 54'; Benedetto 80', 90+2'		Rodelin 77'	Stadium: Stade Parsemain; Attendance: 3,671

== Competitions ==
=== Overall record ===
Competition	First match	Last match	Starting round	Final position	Record							
Competition	First match	Last match	Starting round	Final position	Pld	W	D	L	GF	GA	GD	Win %
Swiss Super League	25 July 2021	22 May 2022	Matchday 1	6th	36	12	8	16	50	66	−16	33.33
Swiss Cup	15 August 2021	27 October 2021	Round 1	Round 3	3	2	0	1	11	5	+6	66.67
Europa Conference League	22 July 2021	29 July 2021	Second qualifying round	Second qualifying round	2	1	0	1	2	3	−1	50.00
Total					41	15	8	18	63	74	−11	36.59

Source: Soccerway

=== Swiss Super League ===
==== League table ====
Pos	Team	Pld	W	D	L	GF	GA	GD	Pts	Qualification or relegation
4	Lugano	36	16	6	14	50	54	−4	54	Qualification for Europa Conference League third qualifying round (Note: Lugano qualified for the Europa Conference League third qualifying round as the 2021–22 Swiss Cup champions.)
5	St. Gallen	36	14	8	14	68	63	+5	50	
6	Servette	36	12	8	16	50	66	−16	44	
7	Sion	36	11	8	17	46	67	−21	41	
8	Grasshopper	36	9	13	14	54	58	−4	40	

Source: Swiss Super League
Rules for classification: 1) Points; 2) Goal difference; 3) Goals scored; 4) Head-to-head goal difference; 5) Away goals scored; 6) Draw.

==== Results summary ====
Overall								Home						Away					
Pld	W	D	L	GF	GA	GD	Pts	W	D	L	GF	GA	GD	W	D	L	GF	GA	GD
20	8	4	8	33	34	−1	28	4	2	4	18	19	−1	4	2	4	15	15	0

Source: Swiss Super League

==== Results by round ====
Round	1	2	3	4	5	6	7
Ground	A	H	A	H	A	H	A
Result	W						
Position	4						

Source: Swiss Super League
A = Away; H = Home; W = Win; D = Draw; L = Loss

==== Matches ====
The league fixtures were announced on 24 June 2021.

25 July 2021 1	Sion	1–2	Servette	Sion
16:30 CEST (UTC+2)	Imeri 21'; Kyei 53'	Summary	Ndoye 90+5'	Stadium: Stade Tourbillon; Attendance: 4,000; Referee: Luca Piccolo

1 August 2021 2	Servette	0–2	Lugano	Geneva
16:30 CEST (UTC+2)		SFL summary	47' Bottani; 49' Abubakar	Stadium: Stade de Genève; Attendance: 3,225; Referee: Alain Bieri

8 August 2021 3	Basel	5–1	Servette	St. Jakob-Park, Basel
16:30	Cabral 19'; Stocker (yellow card) 32'; Kasami (yellow card) 33'; Cabral 45+1' (pen.); Cabral 50'; Esposito 60' (pen.); Cabral 63'	SFL summary	(yellow card) 5' Céspedes; 75' Kyei; (yellow card) 87' Sauthier	Attendance: 16,142; Referee: Luca Piccolo

22 August 2021 4	Servette	4–1	Luzern	Geneva
16:30 CEST (UTC+2)				Stadium: Stade de Genève

29 August 2021 5	Grasshoppers	1–1	Servette	Zürich
16:30 CEST (UTC+2)				Stadium: Letzigrund

12 September 2021 6	Servette	5–1	St. Gallen	Geneva
14:15 CEST (UTC+2)				Stadium: Stade de Genève

21 September 2021 7	Zürich	2–2	Servette	Zürich
20:30 CEST (UTC+2)				Stadium: Letzigrund

25 September 2021 8	Servette	1–1	Lausanne-Sport	Stade de Genève, Geneva
20:30

3 October 2021 9	Servette	0–6	Young Boys	Stade de Genève, Geneva
16:30 CEST (UTC+2)

17 October 2021 10	St. Gallen	2–1	Servette	Kybunpark, St. Gallen

24 October 2021 11	Servette	1–2	Sion	Stade de Genève, Geneva

31 October 2021 12	Lugano	2–1	Servette	Cornaredo, Lugano

7 November 2021 13	Servette	1–2	Zürich	Stade de Genève, Geneva

21 November 2021 14	Servette	3–2	Grasshopper	Stade de Genève, Geneva

28 November 2021 15	Lausanne-Sport	0–3	Servette	Stade de la Tuilière, Lausanne

4 December 2021 16	Young Boys	1–2	Servette	Bern
20:30 CET (UTC+1)				Stadium: Stadion Wankdorf

12 December 2021 17	Servette	2–2	Basel	Stade de Genève, Geneva

18 December 2021 18	Luzern	0–2	Servette	Lucerne
--:-- CET (UTC+1)				Stadium: Swissporarena

29 January 2022 19	Zürich	1–0	Servette	Letzigrund, Zürich

5 February 2022 20	Servette	1–0	Lausanne-Sport	Stade de Genève, Geneva
18:00 CET (UTC+1)	Sasso 41'	SFL summary		Attendance: 11,023; Referee: (Switzerland) Stefan Horisberger

12 February 2022 21	St. Gallen	5–1	Servette	Kybunpark, St. Gallen
20:30 CET (UTC+1)	Ruiz 4'; Guillemenot 10'; Guillemenot 29'; Schubert 63'; Schubert 77'; Lungoyi (yellow card) 83'	SFL summary	2' Schalk; (yellow card) 66' Clichy; (yellow card) 69' Cognat	Attendance: 12,960; Referee: (Switzerland) Sandro Schärer (Buttikon)

20 February 2022 22	Servette	1–1	Luzern	Geneva
16:30 CET (UTC+1)	Bedia 53'	SFL summary	Kvasina 86'	Stadium: Stade de Genève; Attendance: 6,297; Referee: (Switzerland) Urs Schnyder

26 February 2022 23	Lugano	2–0	Servette	Cornaredo, Lugano

1 March 2022 24	Servette	1–0	Young Boys	Stade de Genève, Geneva

6 March 2022 25	Grasshopper	2–4	Servette	Letzigrund, Zürich

13 March 2022 26	Basel	2–0	Servette	St. Jakob-Park, Basel

20 March 2022 27	Servette	2–1	Sion	Stade de Genève, Geneva

3 April 2022 28	Lausanne-Sport	4–1	Servette	Stade de la Tuilière, Lausanne

10 April 2022 29	Servette	1–0	Zürich	Stade de Genève, Geneva

16 April 2022 30	Servette	0–1	Grasshopper	Stade de Genève, Geneva

23 April 2022 31	Young Boys	3–1	Servette	Stadion Wankdorf, Bern

30 April 2022 32	Servette	0–2	St. Gallen	Stade de Genève, Geneva

8 May 2022 33	Luzern	4–0	Servette	Lucerne
--:-- CEST (UTC+2)				Stadium: Swissporarena

11 May 2022 34	Servette	2–2	Lugano	Stade de Genève, Geneva

19 May 2022 35	Servette	0–0	Basel	Stade de Genève, Geneva

22 May 2022 36	Sion	3–3	Servette	Stade Tourbillon, Sion

=== Swiss Cup ===
15 August 2021 Round 1	FC Amical Saint-Prex	0–6	Servette	Saint-Prex
15:00 CEST (UTC+1)		Report	Antunes 1', 23', 45+1'; Oberlin 41'; Valls 82' (pen.); Mendes 83'	Stadium: Stade de Marcy

17 September 2021 Round 2	FC Concordia Basel	1–4	Servette	Basel
20:00 CEST (UTC+1)	Alessio 20'	Report	Schalk 10' 90'; Rodelin 47'; Imeri 86'	Stadium: Stadion Rankhof

27 October 2021 Round 3	FC Thun	4–1	Servette	Thun
20:00 CEST (UTC+1)	Dzonlagic 57'; Bürki 60'; Gerndt 65'; Havenaar 83'	Report	Stevanovic 44'	Stadium: Stockhorn Arena; Attendance: 2298

=== UEFA Europa Conference League ===
==== Second qualifying round ====
The draw for the second qualifying round was held on 16 June 2021, 13:30 CEST.

22 July 2021 First leg	Molde (Norway)	3–0	(Switzerland) Servette	Molde, Norway
18:00 CEST (UTC+2)	Brynhildsen 7'; Omoijuanfo 31'; Eikrem (yellow card) 45+3', (goal) 59'; Risa (yellow card) 57'	Report	Valls (yellow card) 64'; Rouiller (yellow card) 74'	Stadium: Aker Stadion; Referee: Duje Strukan (Croatia)

29 July 2021 Second leg	Servette (Switzerland)	2–0 (2–3 agg.)	(Norway) Molde	Geneva, Switzerland
20:30 CEST (UTC+2)	Frick (yellow card) 8'; Diallo 18', (yellow card) 83'; Stevanović (red card) 44'; Clichy (yellow card) 45+4'; Kyei 59', (yellow card) 66'; Douline (yellow card) 90+1'; Rodelin (yellow card) 90+7'	Report	Haugen (yellow card) 8'; Brynhildsen (yellow card) 42'; Breivik (yellow card) 90+4'	Stadium: Stade de Genève; Referee: Jochem Kamphuis (Netherlands)
