= List of Swiss football transfers summer 2021 =

This is a list of Swiss football transfers for the 2021 summer transfer window. Only transfers featuring Swiss Super League are listed.

== Swiss Super League ==
Note: Flags indicate national team as has been defined under FIFA eligibility rules. Players may hold more than one non-FIFA nationality.

=== Young Boys ===
In:

No.	Pos.	Nation	Player
9	FW	FRA	Wilfried Kanga (from (Turkey) Kayserispor)
17	FW	USA	Jordan Siebatcheu (from (France) Rennes, previously on loan)
23	MF	SUI	Alex Jankewitz (from (England) Southampton)
29	FW	SUI	Yannick Toure (from (England) Newcastle United)

Out:

No.	Pos.	Nation	Player
11	MF	GER	Gianluca Gaudino (to (Germany) SV Sandhausen)
43	GK	SUI	Joschua Neuenschwander (to Kriens)
—	DF	SUI	Lewin Blum (on loan to Yverdon)
—	MF	SUI	Mischa Eberhard (on loan to Yverdon)
—	FW	SUI	Shkelqim Vladi (on loan to Yverdon)
—	DF	SUI	Pascal Schüpbach (on loan to Thun, previously on loan at Winterthur)
—	GK	SUI	Dario Marzino (free agent to Schaffhausen, previously on loan at Winterthur)
—	DF	SUI	Jan Kronig (to Aarau, previously on loan at Wil)
—	FW	ALB	Taulant Seferi (to (Albania) Tirana, previously on loan)

=== Basel ===
In:

No.	Pos.	Nation	Player
5	DF	SUI	Michael Lang (from (Germany) Borussia Mönchengladbach)
6	DF	BFA	Nasser Djiga (from (Burkina Faso) Vitesse)
8	MF	ESP	Jordi Quintillà (from St. Gallen)
9	FW	ITA	Sebastiano Esposito (on loan from (Italy) Inter, previously on loan at (Italy) Venezia)
17	FW	CAN	Liam Millar (from (England) Liverpool, previously on loan at (England) Charlton)
19	MF	SUI	Darian Males (loan extension from (Italy) Inter)
21	DF	FRA	Andy Pelmard (on loan from (France) Nice)
22	DF	ESP	Sergio López (from (Spain) Real Madrid Castilla, previously on loan at (Spain) Valladolid Promesas)
23	MF	NED	Wouter Burger (from (Netherlands) Feyenoord, previously on loan at (Netherlands) Sparta Rotterdam)
27	FW	SUI	Dan Ndoye (on loan from (France) Nice)
30	MF	POR	Tomás Tavares (on loan from (Portugal) Benfica, previously on loan at (Portugal) Farense)
96	MF	POR	Joelson Fernandes (on loan from (Portugal) Sporting B)

Out:

No.	Pos.	Nation	Player
5	DF	SUI	Silvan Widmer (to (Germany) 1. FSV Mainz 05)
6	MF	ALB	Amir Abrashi (loan return to (Germany) SC Freiburg)
7	MF	SUI	Luca Zuffi (to Sion)
8	MF	SUI	Yannick Marchand (on loan to (France) Grenoble)
9	FW	NED	Ricky van Wolfswinkel (to (Netherlands) Twente)
17	DF	SUI	Timm Klose (loan return to (England) Norwich)
18	FW	SUI	Julian Von Moos (on loan to (Netherlands) Vitesse)
21	DF	SUI	Jasper van der Werff (loan return to (Austria) Salzburg)
22	MF	SUI	Orges Bunjaku (to (France) Grenoble)
26	FW	FRA	Aldo Kalulu (to (France) Sochaux)
44	GK	SUI	Jozef Pukaj (to Winterthur)
77	FW	SEN	Kaly Sène (on loan to Grasshoppers)
96	DF	BRA	Jorge (loan return to (France) Monaco)
—	MF	SUI	Samuele Campo (to Luzern, previously on loan at (Germany) SV Darmstadt 98)

=== Servette ===
In:

No.	Pos.	Nation	Player
1	GK	SUI	Steven Deana (from (Germany) MSV Duisburg)
12	FW	FRA	Ronny Rodelin (from (France) Guingamp)
14	FW	SUI	Dimitri Oberlin (from (Germany) Bayern Munich II)
20	MF	GNB	Papu Mendes (from (France) Strasbourg B)
28	MF	FRA	David Douline (from (France) Rodez)

Out:

No.	Pos.	Nation	Player
1	GK	COD	Joël Kiassumbua (free agent)
18	FW	CIV	Koro Koné (to Yverdon)
24	DF	SEN	Arial Mendy (to (France) Clermont)
29	MF	CMR	Gaël Ondoua (to (Germany) Hannover 96)
39	DF	FRA	Alexis Martial (free agent)
—	DF	POR	Lucas Monteiro (on loan to Stade Nyonnais, previously on loan at Étoile Carouge)
—	DF	SUI	Mathis Magnin (on loan to Étoile Carouge, previously on loan at Chiasso)
—	DF	FRA	Quentin Vieira (to (France) GOAL, previously on loan at Étoile Carouge)
—	DF	SUI	Robin Busset (to Kriens, previously on loan)
—	MF	ITA	Andrea Maccoppi (to Chiasso, previously on loan)
—	FW	GER	Varol Tasar (to Luzern, previously on loan)
—	FW	KOS	Alban Ajdini (to Stade Lausanne Ouchy, previously on loan)

=== Lugano ===
In:

No.	Pos.	Nation	Player
4	DF	KOS	Kreshnik Hajrizi (from Chiasso)
9	FW	BRA	Luis Phelipe (on loan from (Austria) Salzburg, previously on loan at (Brazil) Bragantino)
19	FW	SVN	Žan Celar (from (Italy) Roma)
21	DF	BRA	Yuri (from (Brazil) Ponte Preta)
26	GK	SUI	Amir Saipi (from Schaffhausen)
27	MF	BRA	Régis (on loan from (Brazil) Chapecoense, previously on loan at (Brazil) CRB)
29	MF	TUN	Hadj Mahmoud (from (Tunisia) Étoile Sportive du Sahel)
45	DF	POR	Hélder Baldé (from (Portugal) Aves)
—	MF	SVN	Abel Marc (from (Slovenia) Bilje)

Out:

No.	Pos.	Nation	Player
3	DF	ESP	Adrià Guerrero (loan return to (Spain) Valencia B)
4	DF	HUN	Ákos Kecskés (to (Russia) Nizhny Novgorod)
7	DF	KOS	Cendrim Kameraj (free agent)
13	DF	NGA	Lucky Opara (loan return to (Latvia) Spartaks Jūrmala)
19	FW	SWE	Alexander Gerndt (to Thun)
23	FW	URU	Joaquín Ardaiz (to Schaffhausen)
25	DF	LVA	Mārcis Ošs (loan return to (Latvia) Spartaks Jūrmala)
76	GK	SUI	Lucio Soldini (to Chiasso)
—	MF	SVN	Abel Marc (on loan to (Slovenia) Gorica)
—	MF	NGA	Chinwendu Johan Nkama (on loan to (Slovenia) Aluminij, previously on loan at (Slovenia) Gorica)
—	DF	ITA	Leonardo Rivoira (free agent, previously on loan at (Latvia) Spartaks Jūrmala)
—	MF	GHA	Ransford Selasi (to Kriens, previously on loan)
—	FW	KOS	Leotrim Kryeziu (to (Kosovo) Prishtina, previously on loan)
—	FW	HUN	Filip Holender (to (Serbia) Partizan, previously on loan)

=== Luzern ===
In:

No.	Pos.	Nation	Player
4	MF	GER	Christian Gentner (from (Germany) Union Berlin)
6	MF	NED	Jordy Wehrmann (from (Netherlands) Feyenoord, previously on loan)
10	MF	SUI	Samuele Campo (from Basel, previously on loan at (Germany) SV Darmstadt 98)
16	FW	GER	Varol Tasar (from Servette, previously on loan)
28	DF	GER	Holger Badstuber (from (Germany) Stuttgart II)
29	DF	AUT	Patrick Farkas (from (Austria) Salzburg)
66	DF	KOS	David Domgjoni (from (Turkey) Menemenspor)
90	GK	SRB	Vaso Vasić (from (Belgium) Mouscron)

Out:

No.	Pos.	Nation	Player
1	GK	SUI	David Zibung (retired)
4	DF	SUI	Stefan Knezevic (to (Belgium) Charleroi)
5	DF	BRA	Lucas (to (Saudi Arabia) Al-Tai)
6	DF	SUI	Marco Bürki (to Thun)
10	MF	AUT	Louis Schaub (loan return to (Germany) 1. FC Köln)
14	MF	ESP	Álex Carbonell (to (Spain) Celta Vigo B)
21	DF	SUI	Ashvin Balaruban (on loan to Kriens)
27	DF	SUI	Christian Schwegler (retired)
71	MF	SUI	Lino Lang (on loan to Kriens)
73	FW	SUI	Aziz Binous (on loan to Kriens)
—	GK	SUI	Simon Enzler (to Aarau, previously on loan)
—	MF	SUI	Marco Rüedi (to Cham, previously on loan)
—	MF	SUI	Daniel Follonier (free agent, previously on loan at Kriens)

=== Lausanne ===
In:

No.	Pos.	Nation	Player
3	DF	ENG	Archie Brown (from (England) Derby County U23)
9	FW	SUI	Zeki Amdouni (from Stade Lausanne Ouchy)
12	FW	COD	Medy Kingombe Kabamba (from (France) Monaco U19)
17	MF	FRA	Goduine Koyalipou (from (France) Niort)
19	MF	FRA	Maxen Kapo (from (France) PSG Academy)
20	MF	FRA	Hicham Mahou (from (France) Nice, previously on loan)
21	MF	CIV	Jean N'Guessan (on loan from (France) Nice)
24	DF	CIV	Armel Zohouri (from (France) Nice, previously on loan)
38	MF	CIV	Trazié Thomas (from (France) Nice, previously on loan)
91	GK	FRA	Melvin Mastil (from Echallens, previously on loan)
98	FW	ENG	Trae Coyle (from (England) Arsenal U23)

Out:

No.	Pos.	Nation	Player
5	DF	SUI	Noah Loosli (to Grasshoppers)
9	FW	FRA	Evann Guessand (loan return to (France) Nice)
10	MF	FRA	Lucas Da Cunha (loan return to (France) Nice)
12	FW	COD	Jonathan Bolingi (loan return to (Belgium) Antwerp)
17	MF	NOR	Rafik Zekhnini (loan return to (Italy) Fiorentina)
25	DF	SRB	Nikola Boranijašević (to Zürich)
33	MF	SUI	Isaac Schmidt (to St. Gallen)
38	MF	POR	Pedro Brazão (loan return to (France) Nice)
39	FW	SUI	Josias Lukembila (free agent)
45	MF	SUI	Stéphane Cueni (on loan to Stade Lausanne Ouchy)
—	FW	BFA	Anthony Koura (free agent, previously on loan at Neuchâtel Xamax)

=== St. Gallen ===
In:

No.	Pos.	Nation	Player
7	FW	AUT	Fabian Schubert (from (Austria) Blau-Weiß Linz)
8	MF	MLI	Ousmane Diakité (on loan from (Austria) Salzburg)
13	MF	GER	Leonhard Münst (on loan from (Germany) Stuttgart II)
20	FW	FRA	Élie Youan (from (France) Nantes, previously on loan)
24	DF	PHI	Michael Kempter (from Neuchâtel Xamax)
33	MF	SUI	Isaac Schmidt (from Lausanne)

Out:

No.	Pos.	Nation	Player
8	MF	ESP	Jordi Quintillà (to Basel)
9	FW	AUT	Chukwubuike Adamu (loan return to (Austria) Salzburg)
21	DF	SUI	Miro Muheim (on loan to (Germany) Hamburger SV)
22	DF	SUI	Adonis Ajeti (free agent)
27	FW	SUI	Fabio Solimando (free agent)
40	GK	SUI	Nico Strübi (to (Liechtenstein) Vaduz)
52	FW	SUI	Angelo Campos (on loan to Brühl)
77	MF	FRA	Nsana Simon (to (Slovenia) Bravo)
98	DF	FRA	Yannis Letard (to (Austria) LASK)
—	FW	ALB	Florian Kamberi (on loan to (England) Sheffield Wednesday, previously on loan at (Scotland) Aberdeen)
—	DF	SUI	Vincent Rüfli (to Stade Lausanne Ouchy, previously on loan)

=== Zürich ===
In:

No.	Pos.	Nation	Player
3	DF	ESP	Adrià Guerrero (from (Spain) Valencia B, previously on loan at Lugano)
6	DF	KOS	Fidan Aliti (from (Sweden) Kalmar, previously on loan)
14	MF	NED	Carson Buschman-Dormond (on loan from (Estonia) Tulevik)
16	DF	GER	Marc Hornschuh (from (Germany) HSV II)
19	DF	SRB	Nikola Boranijašević (from Lausanne)
29	FW	URU	Rodrigo Pollero (on loan from Schaffhausen)
39	MF	GER	Akaki Gogia (from (Germany) Union Berlin)
78	MF	GER	Moritz Leitner (from (England) Norwich)

Out:

No.	Pos.	Nation	Player
3	DF	BRA	Nathan (to (United States) San Jose Earthquakes)
5	DF	GER	Lasse Sobiech (loan return to (Germany) 1. FC Köln)
7	MF	SUI	Adrian Winter (free agent)
14	MF	SUI	Toni Domgjoni (to (Netherlands) Vitesse)
16	GK	SUI	Novem Baumann (to Juventus Zürich)
19	DF	SUI	Tobias Schättin (to Winterthur)
27	MF	SUI	Marco Schönbächler (free agent)
70	MF	KOS	Benjamin Kololli (to (Japan) Shimizu S-Pulse)
71	MF	KOS	Hekuran Kryeziu (free agent)
77	DF	CIV	Willie Britto (free agent)
—	MF	SUI	Maren Haile-Selassie (to Neuchâtel Xamax, previously on loan at Wil)

=== Sion ===
In:

No.	Pos.	Nation	Player
7	MF	SUI	Luca Zuffi (from Basel)
12	GK	GRE	Alexandros Safarikas (on loan from Chiasso)
33	MF	SUI	Kevin Bua (from (Spain) Leganés)
70	FW	BRA	Marquinhos Cipriano (on loan from (Ukraine) Shakhtar Donetsk)
—	MF	BRA	Silva (from Chiasso)

Out:

No.	Pos.	Nation	Player
4	DF	SUI	Nikita Vlasenko (loan return to (Italy) Juventus B)
7	MF	ITA	Luca Clemenza (loan return to (Italy) Juventus B)
28	GK	SUI	Damien Buchard (on loan to Yverdon)
30	DF	ALG	Ayoub Abdellaoui (free agent)
52	DF	BRA	Wesley (loan return to (Italy) Juventus B)
98	FW	SVK	Ľubomír Tupta (loan return to (Italy) Hellas Verona)
—	MF	BRA	Silva (on loan to Yverdon)
—	DF	BRA	Raphael Rossi (to (Poland) Radomiak Radom, previously on loan)
—	FW	SUI	Aimery Pinga (to (Belgium) Virton)

=== Grasshoppers ===
In:

No.	Pos.	Nation	Player
1	GK	POR	André Moreira (from (Portugal) Belenenses SAD)
6	MF	ALB	Amir Abrashi (from (Germany) SC Freiburg, previously on loan at Basel)
17	FW	SEN	Kaly Sène (on loan from Basel)
19	FW	ECU	Leonardo Campana (on loan from (England) Wolves, previously on loan at (Portugal) Famalicão)
20	MF	KOS	Imran Bunjaku (free agent)
28	MF	SVN	Christián Herc (from (England) Wolves, previously on loan at (Czech Republic) Karviná)
33	DF	AUT	Georg Margreitter (from (Germany) 1. FC Nürnberg)
40	MF	JPN	Hayao Kawabe (from (Japan) Sanfrecce Hiroshima)
41	DF	SUI	Noah Loosli (from Lausanne)
77	DF	HUN	Bendegúz Bolla (on loan from (England) Wolves)
79	FW	POR	Vasco Paciência (on loan from (Portugal) Benfica B)

Out:

No.	Pos.	Nation	Player
1	GK	SUI	Mirko Salvi (to Yverdon)
2	DF	DEN	Oskar Buur (loan return to (England) Wolves)
4	DF	POR	Miguel Nóbrega (loan return to (Portugal) Benfica B)
11	FW	NED	Hicham Acheffay (from (Netherlands) De Graafschap)
14	MF	IRL	Connor Ronan (loan return to (England) Wolves)
17	FW	POR	Cristian Ponde (free agent)
30	MF	POR	Nuno Pina (loan return to (Italy) Chievo)
32	DF	FRA	Anthony Goelzer (to Kriens)
36	GK	SUI	Marvin Keller (to Wil)
57	GK	SUI	Matthias Minder (free agent)
—	MF	LBR	Allen Njie (to Aarau, previously on loan at (Croatia) Slaven Belupo)
—	FW	SUI	Oscar Correia (to Chiasso, previously on loan at Étoile Carouge)

== See also ==
- 2021–22 Swiss Super League
