= List of Swiss football transfers winter 2023–24 =

This is a list of Swiss football transfers for the 2023–24 winter transfer window. Only transfers featuring Swiss Super League are listed.

== Swiss Super League ==
Note: Flags indicate national team as has been defined under FIFA eligibility rules. Players may hold more than one non-FIFA nationality.

=== Young Boys ===
In:

No.	Pos.	Nation	Player
3	DF	ALG	Jaouen Hadjam (from (France) Nantes)
4	DF	SUI	Aurèle Amenda (on loan from (Germany) Eintracht Frankfurt)
5	DF	SUI	Anel Husic (from Lausanne-Sport)
32	FW	NOR	Joel Mvuka (on loan from (France) Lorient)
—	DF	SUI	Zachary Athekame (from Neuchâtel Xamax)

Out:

No.	Pos.	Nation	Player
4	DF	SUI	Aurèle Amenda (to (Germany) Eintracht Frankfurt)
14	MF	ZAM	Miguel Chaiwa (on loan to Schaffhausen)
18	FW	CMR	Jean-Pierre Nsame (to (Italy) Como)
21	DF	SUI	Ulisses Garcia (to (France) Marseille)
22	MF	KOS	Donat Rrudhani (on loan to Lausanne-Sport)
61	GK	SUI	Leandro Zbinden (to Étoile Carouge)
—	DF	SUI	Zachary Athekame (on loan to Neuchâtel Xamax)

=== Servette ===
In:

No.	Pos.	Nation	Player
2	DF	TUN	Omar Rekik (on loan from (England) Arsenal, previously on loan at (England) Wigan Athletic)
7	FW	JPN	Takuma Nishimura (on loan from (Japan) Yokohama F. Marinos)
11	FW	SEN	Bassirou N'Diaye (on loan from (France) Lorient)
25	DF	TUN	Dylan Bronn (on loan from (Italy) Salernitana)

Out:

No.	Pos.	Nation	Player
2	DF	FRA	Moussa Diallo (on loan to (Bulgaria) Beroe)
11	FW	FRA	Boubacar Fofana (to Winterthur)
21	DF	SUI	Baba Souare (to (Denmark) Næstved)
23	FW	SUI	Ronny Rodelin (on loan to Perly-Certoux)
26	DF	SUI	Noah Henchoz (on loan to Étoile Carouge)
29	FW	CIV	Chris Bedia (to (Germany) Union Berlin)
33	DF	SUI	Nicolas Vouilloz (to Basel)
45	MF	FRA	Hussayn Touati (on loan to Wil)

=== Lugano ===
In:

No.	Pos.	Nation	Player
36	DF	USA	Justin Reynolds (on loan from (United States) Chicago Fire)
93	FW	POL	Kacper Przybyłko (from (United States) Chicago Fire)

Out:

No.	Pos.	Nation	Player
8	MF	SUI	Adrian Durrer (on loan to Winterthur)
34	DF	SUI	Allan Arigoni (on loan to (United States) Chicago Fire)
90	GK	SUI	Steven Deana (to Grasshoppers)
—	MF	SUI	Maren Haile-Selassie (to (United States) Chicago Fire, previously on loan)

=== Luzern ===
In:

No.	Pos.	Nation	Player
3	DF	SWE	Jesper Löfgren (on loan from (Sweden) Djurgården, previously on loan at (Sweden) Brommapojkarna)
9	FW	AUT	Adrian Grbić (on loan from (France) Lorient)

Out:

No.	Pos.	Nation	Player
21	FW	POR	Asumah Abubakar (to Grasshoppers)

=== Basel ===
In:

No.	Pos.	Nation	Player
3	DF	SUI	Nicolas Vouilloz (from Servette)
7	MF	KOS	Benjamin Kololli (from (Japan) Shimizu S-Pulse)
23	FW	SUI	Albian Ajeti (from (Turkey) Gaziantep)
28	MF	SUI	Dion Kacuri (from Grasshoppers)

Out:

No.	Pos.	Nation	Player
8	MF	BEL	Jonathan Dubasin (on loan to (Spain) Real Oviedo)

=== St. Gallen ===
In:

No.	Pos.	Nation	Player
30	MF	ESP	Víctor Ruiz (from (Saudi Arabia) Al-Fayha)
90	FW	SRB	Jovan Milošević (on loan from (Germany) VfB Stuttgart)

Out:

No.	Pos.	Nation	Player
34	MF	SUI	Stefano Guidotti (to (Italy) Olbia)
50	DF	SUI	Nicolas Lüchinger (retired)

=== Grasshoppers ===
In:

No.	Pos.	Nation	Player
19	MF	AUT	Dijon Kameri (on loan from (Austria) Red Bull Salzburg)
27	FW	POR	Asumah Abubakar (from Luzern)
70	MF	GER	Oliver Batista Meier (on loan from (Germany) Dynamo Dresden, previously on loan at (Germany) SC Verl)
90	GK	SUI	Steven Deana (from Lugano)

Out:

No.	Pos.	Nation	Player
17	MF	SUI	Dion Kacuri (to Basel)
19	FW	CAN	Theo Corbeanu (loan return to (England) Wolverhampton Wanderers)
74	FW	SUI	Elmin Rastoder (on loan to (Liechtenstein) Vaduz)

=== Zürich ===
In:

No.	Pos.	Nation	Player
33	FW	ZAM	Joseph Sabobo (from (Zambia) Atletico Lusaka, previously on loan at (Zambia) Nkwazi)
44	DF	MLI	Amadou Danté (on loan from (Austria) Sturm Graz)

Out:

No.	Pos.	Nation	Player
8	MF	ISR	Arad Bar (to (Ukraine) LNZ Cherkasy)

=== Winterthur ===
In:

No.	Pos.	Nation	Player
22	MF	SUI	Adrian Durrer (on loan from Lugano)
28	FW	FRA	Antoine Baroan (from (Bulgaria) Botev Plovdiv)
29	FW	FRA	Boubacar Fofana (from Servette)

Out:

No.	Pos.	Nation	Player
5	DF	SUI	Roy Gelmi (to (Liechtenstein) Vaduz)
8	MF	SRB	Samir Ramizi (to Neuchâtel Xamax)
17	FW	SUI	Samuel Ballet (to (Italy) Como)
22	MF	SUI	Noe Holenstein (on loan to Cham)
—	FW	SUI	Neftali Manzambi (to Schaffhausen, previously on loan)

=== Yverdon-Sport ===
In:

No.	Pos.	Nation	Player
3	DF	SRB	Dimitrije Kamenović (on loan from (Italy) Lazio)
9	FW	FRA	Marley Aké (on loan from (Italy) Juventus, previously on loan at (Italy) Udinese)
11	FW	ESP	Kevin Carlos (from (Spain) Huesca, previously on loan)
13	MF	LUX	Mathias Olesen (on loan from (Germany) 1. FC Köln)
40	GK	FRA	Paul Bernardoni (from (Turkey) Konyaspor)
42	MF	NOR	Magnus Grødem (from (Norway) Molde)
44	MF	SRB	Vladan Vidaković (from (Slovenia) Maribor, previously on loan at (Serbia) Spartak Subotica)

Out:

No.	Pos.	Nation	Player
1	GK	CAN	Sebastian Breza (loan return to (Italy) Bologna)
3	DF	SUI	Aris Sörensen (to Bellinzona)
9	MF	ITA	Saliou Thioune (to Paradiso)
12	DF	ALG	Haithem Loucif (on loan to Lausanne-Sport)
68	FW	FRA	Brian Beyer (to (France) Annecy)

=== Lausanne-Sport ===
In:

No.	Pos.	Nation	Player
12	DF	HUN	Gábor Szalai (from (Hungary) Kecskemét)
13	DF	ALG	Haithem Loucif (on loan from Yverdon-Sport)
29	MF	KOS	Donat Rrudhani (on loan from Young Boys)
30	MF	ITA	Simone Pafundi (on loan from (Italy) Udinese)

Out:

No.	Pos.	Nation	Player
4	DF	SUI	Anel Husic (to Young Boys)
16	MF	SUI	Mayka Okuka (on loan to Bulle)
28	MF	JPN	Toichi Suzuki (to (Japan) Kyoto Sanga)
77	MF	SUI	Dominik Schwizer (on loan to Neuchâtel Xamax)

=== Lausanne Ouchy ===
In:

No.	Pos.	Nation	Player
11	FW	MDA	Vitalie Damașcan (on loan from (Romania) Sepsi OSK)
26	DF	GUI	Ibrahim Diakité (on loan from (France) Reims)
99	FW	GER	Gabriel Kyeremateng (on loan from (Belgium) Beveren)

Out:

No.	Pos.	Nation	Player
9	FW	FRA	Zachary Hadji (on loan to Neuchâtel Xamax)
11	MF	FRA	Maxence Renoud (on loan to (France) Marignane)
15	MF	GHA	Emmanuel Essiam (loan return to Basel)
30	GK	SUI	Tristan Zesiger (to Bulle)
31	FW	FRA	Florian Danho (on loan to (Portugal) Famalicão)

== See also ==
- 2023–24 Swiss Super League
