= Gaël Clichy =

French footballer (born 1985)

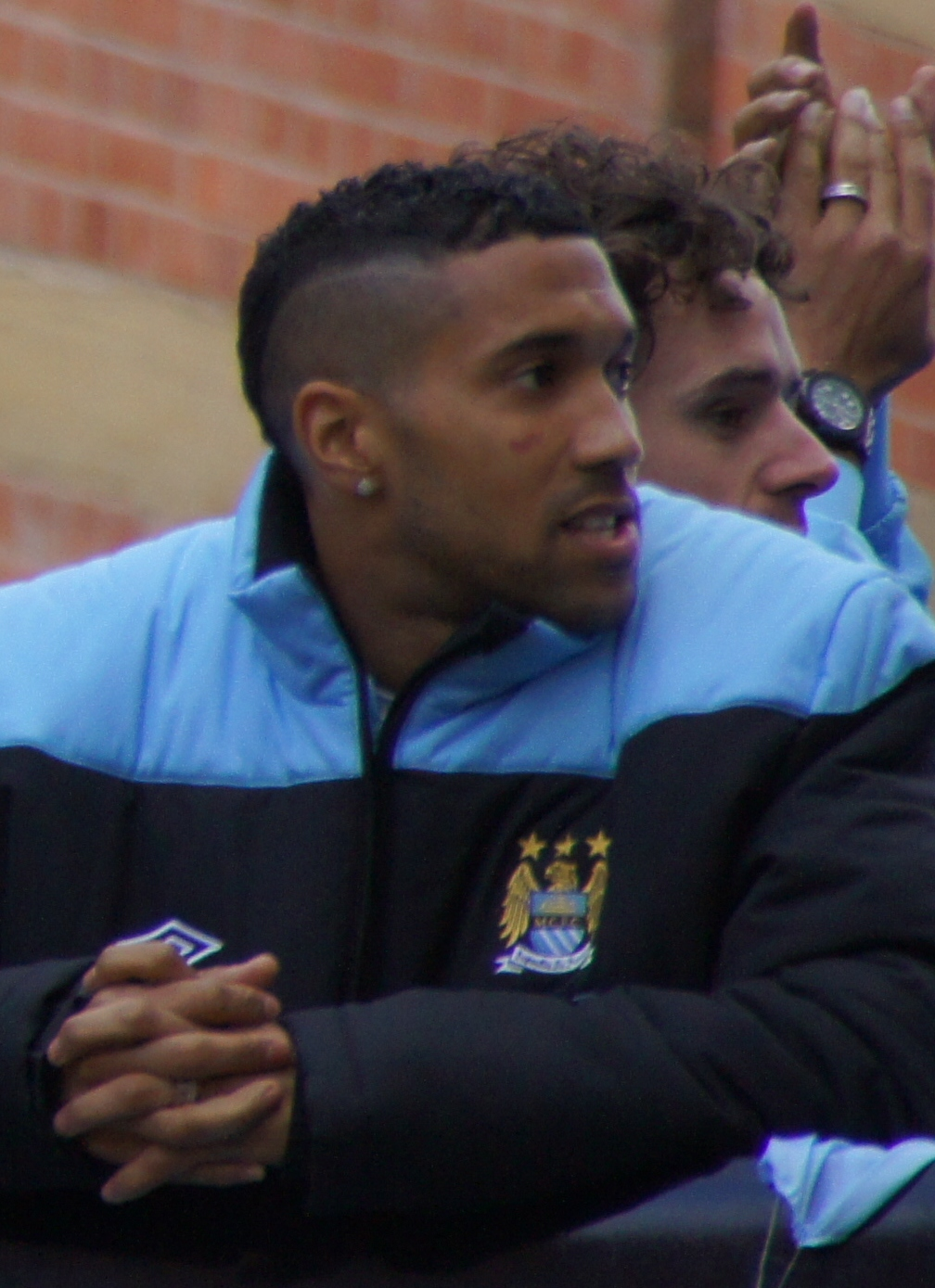
- Clichy with Manchester City, celebrating winning the Premier League in 2012

Personal information
- Full name: Gaël Dimitri Clichy
- Date of birth: 26 July 1985 (age 41)
- Place of birth: Toulouse, France
- Height: 1.76 m (5 ft 9 in)
- Position: Left-back

Team information
- Current team: Caen (head coach)

Youth career
- 1990–1996: Hersoise
- 1996–1997: Matador F.C
- 1997–1998: Muret
- 1998–2000: Tournefeuille
- 2000–2002: Cannes

Senior career*
Years	Team	Apps	(Gls)
2002–2003	Cannes	15	(2)
2003–2011	Arsenal	187	(1)
2011–2017	Manchester City	138	(2)
2017–2020	İstanbul Başakşehir	87	(3)
2020–2023	Servette	79	(1)
Total		506	(9)

International career
2004–2005	France U21	13	(0)
2008–2013	France	20	(0)

Managerial career
- 2026–: Caen
Medal record
Men's football
Representing France
UEFA European Under-17 Championship
Runner-up	2002
- * Club domestic league appearances and goals

Gaël Dimitri Clichy (born 26 July 1985) is a French former professional footballer, who played as a left-back, and current manager. He is currently the head coach of Ligue 3 club Caen.

Clichy was born in Toulouse and began his football career playing for local amateur clubs before joining Cannes in 2000. He made his professional debut for the club in the 2002–03 season in the Championnat National, the third level of French football. After three seasons with Cannes, in 2003, he was convinced by manager Arsène Wenger to join Arsenal in England. In Clichy's first season with the club, he was a member of the squad, dubbed the Invincibles, that went undefeated in the league season. At 18 years and 10 months, he became the youngest player to win a Premier League medal, and also won the 2004 FA Community Shield. After three seasons of backing up Ashley Cole, Clichy became Arsenal's first-choice left-back in the 2006–07 season. In the 2007–08 season, he appeared in all 38 league matches. His performances during the season earned him an appearance on the Professional Footballers' Association (PFA) Team of the Year. Clichy moved in 2011 to Manchester City, adding two more Premier League titles (2011–12 and 2013–14) and two League Cups (2014 and 2016). He left England after 14 years for Turkish side İstanbul Başakşehir in 2017, with whom he won the Süper Lig in 2019–20.

Clichy was French youth international and represented his nation at every level for which he was eligible, including the under-17 team that finished runners-up to Switzerland at the 2002 UEFA European Under-17 Football Championship. He made his senior international debut in September 2008 in a 2010 FIFA World Cup qualification match against Serbia. He made his first major international tournament appearance for France at the 2010 FIFA World Cup. Clichy made one appearance in the competition against South Africa in the final group stage match. He additionally featured in the UEFA Euro 2012 squad, before making his last international appearance in 2013.

== Early life ==
Clichy was born and raised in Toulouse, in southwestern France. His mother, Jacqueline, is a medical nurse, while his father, Claude, was an educator in the city. While Clichy was beginning his football career, his father often served as a part-time coach and referee. At the age of 15 while playing for Cannes, Clichy nearly died. After climbing over a metal fence while crossing a ground at the club's facility, a ring he was wearing got caught in the fence, which resulted in the skin and tissue from the fourth finger of his right hand being completely torn off. During the seven-hour operation to repair the finger, Clichy's heart stopped beating due to a problem with his lungs. It restarted after 15 seconds. The doctor who led the operation described Clichy's survival as "a miracle", while the player himself admitted that the ordeal changed his attitude towards life stating "It made me realise that life can go quick. You could leave tomorrow so you have to enjoy it to the maximum so you don't regret anything the next day. You can look forward to the future but not too far ahead".

== Club career ==
=== Early career ===
Gael Clichy was a serious boy, a worker who put into practice what we asked of him. He worked hard. I enjoyed his behavior and his state of mind. He was always very aggressive in his play and he was very fast. He's a boy who, at the time of his visit to Cannes, knew what he wanted to be and he had his head on his shoulders.

— Christian Lopez on his first impressions of Clichy.

Clichy began his football career at the age of five playing for his hometown club AS Hersoise. He, initially, was a predominantly right-footed player, but through decisive coaching from his father, Clichy's left foot eventually became his primary. One such example of his father's coaching came during a regional youth cup match, which his father was refereeing. The younger Clichy was informed by his father that if he scored a goal with his right foot, he would disallow it. Following this, Clichy developed his left foot "to the point where he eventually forgot his right foot". After five seasons with Hersoise, Clichy joined JS Cugnaux, a local club based in nearby Cugnaux. He spent only one year at the club before moving to AS Muret.

In 1998, Clichy joined AS Tournefeuille and began attending secondary at the Collège Leonardo da Vinci. During his stint at Tournefeuille, he was selected to attend the Pôle Espoirs de Castelmaurou, a regional academy located in the Midi-Pyrénées region that trained players similarly to the Clairefontaine academy in Île-de-France. Clichy spent three years at the center training there during the weekdays and playing with Tournefeuille on the weekends. In 2000, after developing at both Tournefeuille and Castelmaurou, Clichy was linked to a host of professional clubs, including Auxerre, Bordeaux, and Toulouse who were seeking to obtain his services. The young player ultimately decided to move to the Provence-Alpes-Côte d'Azur region to play for professional club Cannes.

Clichy arrived to Cannes in 2000 while the club was playing in Ligue 2, the second division of French football. While at the club, Clichy primarily played as a central midfielder and was supervised by former French international and Saint-Étienne player Christian Lopez. He began his career with the club playing in its youth academy alongside Julien Faubert. During the latter part of the 2001–02 season, Clichy spent time playing on the club's reserve team in the Championnat de France amateur 2, the fifth level of French football. In the following season, with the club now playing in the Championnat National, the third level of French football, he was promoted to the senior team on a permanent basis by Lopez, who was now managing the club. Clichy later played under Robert Buigues following the sacking of Lopez and appeared in 15 matches with the team assisting on two goals.

=== Arsenal ===
==== 2003–2006 ====
Arsenal manager Arsène Wenger had noticed Clichy's talents when the player first arrived at Cannes at the age of 16. Following the 2002–03 season, Wenger contacted Clichy directly in an attempt to sign the player. In June 2003, the Arsenal manager visited the Clichy household in Tournefeuille and offered him a professional contract with the club. Wenger informed Clichy that "you'll play", which was enough to convince both the player and his family.

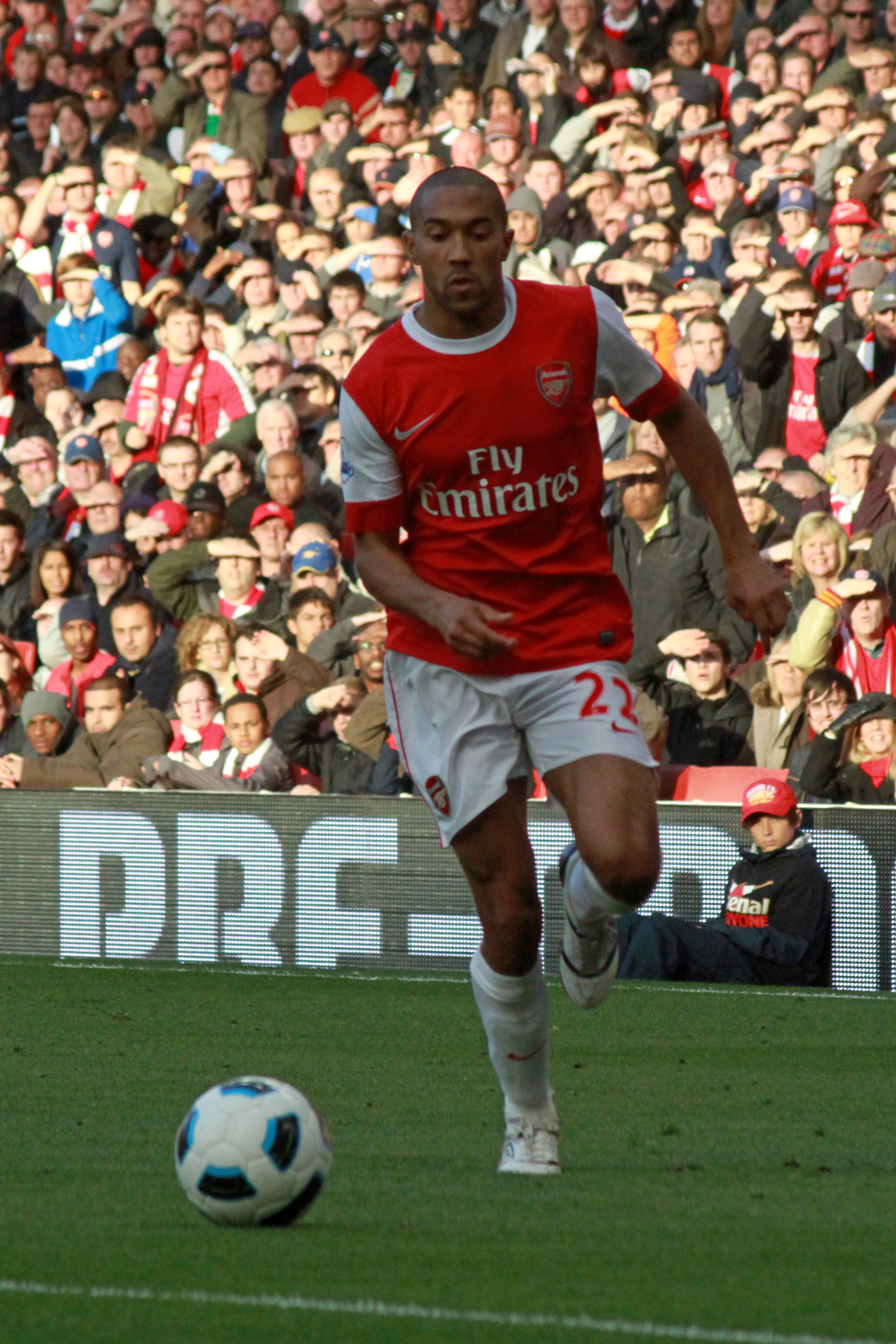
Clichy playing for Arsenal in 2010

As promised by Wenger, Clichy began the season on the club's senior team primarily as the backup to England international Ashley Cole. He made his club debut on 28 October 2003 alongside fellow débutant Cesc Fàbregas in a League Cup encounter with Rotherham United. Arsenal won the tie 9–8 on penalties with Clichy converting his spot kick. On 22 November, Clichy made his league debut in a 3–0 win over Birmingham City. Following an injury to Cole in December, Clichy appeared in nine straight matches; six of them as a starter. On 24 February 2004, he made his UEFA Champions League debut in the first leg of the team's 3–2 knockout round victory over Spanish club Celta Vigo. Clichy finished the campaign appearing in seven more matches. On 9 May 2004, he appeared as a substitute in Arsenal's 1–0 league win over Fulham. A week later, Clichy appeared on the bench in the team's final league match of the season; a 2–1 win over Leicester City. The victory assured Arsenal an undefeated league season, which resulted in the club becoming the second first division team in English football history to finish a league season unbeaten. As a result of the title, at 18 years and 10 months, Clichy became the youngest player to win a Premier League medal.

Clichy remained second-choice to Cole for the 2004–05 season. Wenger did install the young defender as first-choice for FA Cup matches. Clichy appeared as a starter for every round until Arsenal reached the semi-finals when he was replaced by Cole. The club ultimately won the competition defeating Manchester United 5–4 on penalties to give Clichy his first domestic cup honour. In the Premier League, Clichy appeared in 15 matches, seven as a starter. In the UEFA Champions League, he only made two appearances; a 5–1 group stage victory over Norwegian club Rosenborg and a 3–1 knockout round defeat to German outfit Bayern Munich. Clichy's season ultimately ended prematurely in April due to a recurring foot injury.

In the 2005–06 season, Clichy was handed an opportunity to earn a regular place in the starting line-up after Cole suffered a fractured foot in October 2005. The injury seemed to signify that Clichy would earn some valuable first-team action during Cole's time out, however, after appearing six straight matches as a starter, Clichy suffered a similar injury in November, which ruled him out for four months. He returned to the team on 25 April 2006 in a Champions League semi-final tie against Spanish outfit Villarreal coming on as a substitute for the injured Mathieu Flamini. In the late stages of the match, Clichy was adjudged to have committed a foul in the box on striker José Mari, which resulted in a penalty taken by Juan Román Riquelme, which was saved by Jens Lehmann. Had Riquelme converted, the game would have gone to extra time. After appearing in a 3–0 win over Sunderland in the league the following week, Clichy suffered a re-occurrence of his foot injury. The relapse resulted in the player missing the 2006 UEFA Champions League final, sitting on the bench for the whole match. Arsenal lost the match 2–1 to Barcelona.

==== 2006–2011 ====
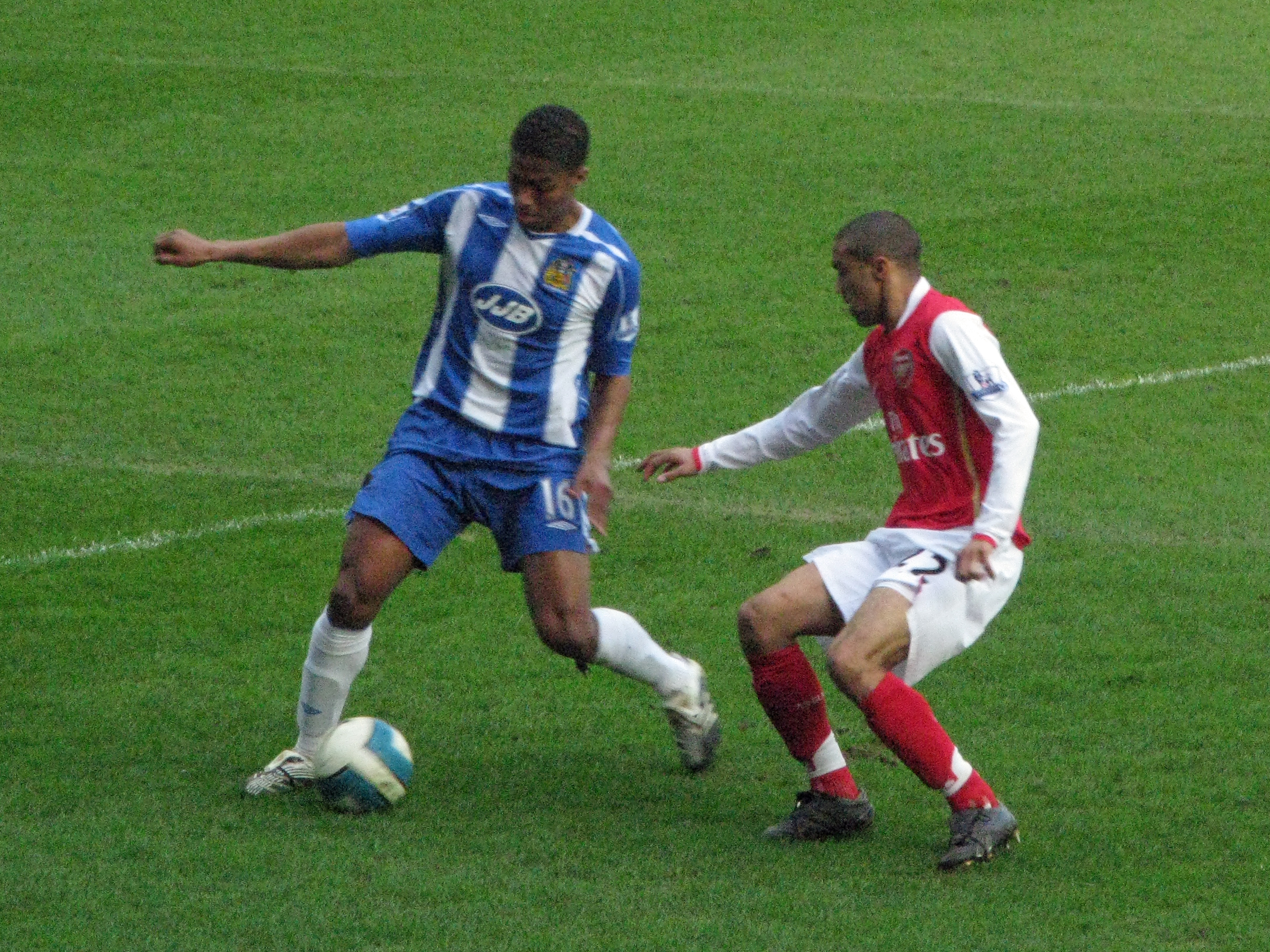
Clichy defending against Antonio Valencia in the 2007–08 season

During the 2006 off-season, Clichy struggled to rehab his foot injury. The injury became so agitating for the player that Wenger was forced to intervene on the rehabilitation process. Wenger, subsequently, recommended Clichy visit Dr. Mark Myerson, an orthopaedic and medical director for the Institute for Foot and Ankle Reconstruction at the Mercy Medical Center in Baltimore, Maryland. Clichy visited Myerson in June 2006 and was forced to undergo another surgery. The operation resulted in the player missing the 2006 UEFA European Under-21 Football Championship, as well as three months of domestic football with Arsenal. In August 2006, Cole departed the club for rivals Chelsea, a transfer which paved the way for Clichy to take over as the permanent starter. In three seasons as Cole's understudy, Clichy made a total of 24 league appearances for Arsenal and 57 overall.

Clichy made his return to the team on 14 October 2006 in a 3–0 league victory over Watford appearing as a substitute. He returned to the starting line-up ten days later playing the entire match in a League Cup win over West Bromwich Albion. Clichy, subsequently, featured as a starter in the next 19 matches. On 3 March 2007, Clichy assisted on the game-winning goal scored by Júlio Baptista in a 2–1 win over Reading.

In the 2007–08 season, Clichy had arguably the best season of his career. He appeared in a career-high and team-best 49 matches and was the only player in the team to appear in all 38 league matches. Clichy also posted a career-high in assists delivering six with two of them coming in back-to-back league wins over Everton and West Ham United in December and January. On 28 April 2008, he assisted on two goals in a 6–2 hammering of Derby County. For his performances during the season, Clichy was named to the Professional Footballers' Association (PFA) Team of the Year alongside teammates Bacary Sagna, Emmanuel Adebayor, and Cesc Fàbregas. He also finished second in the Arsenal fans' poll for the club's Player of the Season. However, despite the impressive individual season, Arsenal, for the third consecutive season, failed to win any trophies. On 16 May 2008, Arsenal awarded Clichy with a new two-year contract extension keeping him at the club until 2012.

During Arsenal's pre-season campaign ahead of the 2008–09 season, Clichy captained the team for the first time in its 2–1 win over Barnet. He remained a fixture within the starting eleven during the season despite the emergence of youngster Kieran Gibbs. On 1 November 2008, Clichy scored his first professional goal in a 2–1 defeat to Stoke City. After consistently appearing with the team for the majority of the campaign, in April 2009, Clichy began missing matches due to an unspecified injury. After being sidelined for several weeks, it was announced in early May that the defender would miss the remainder of the 2008–09 season due to a back injury. Similar to his foot injury three seasons ago, during the high note of the 2009–10 season, Clichy's back injury relapse after it was revealed that the player suffered a stress fracture of the lower back in the team's 3–0 win over North London rivals Tottenham Hotspur. Despite being initially ruled out for a month, Clichy missed ten weeks and returned to the team in January 2010. He appeared in all of the club's remaining matches excluding one.

A healthy Clichy started the 2010–11 season as the starting left-back domestically and internationally for the first time. On 30 October, he assisted on the only goal scored by Alex Song in the team's 1–0 league win over West Ham United. Clichy scored his second career goal on 2 March 2011 in the team's 5–0 win over Leyton Orient in a FA Cup replay tie. Altogether Clichy made a sum of 264 appearances and scored twice for Arsenal.

=== Manchester City ===
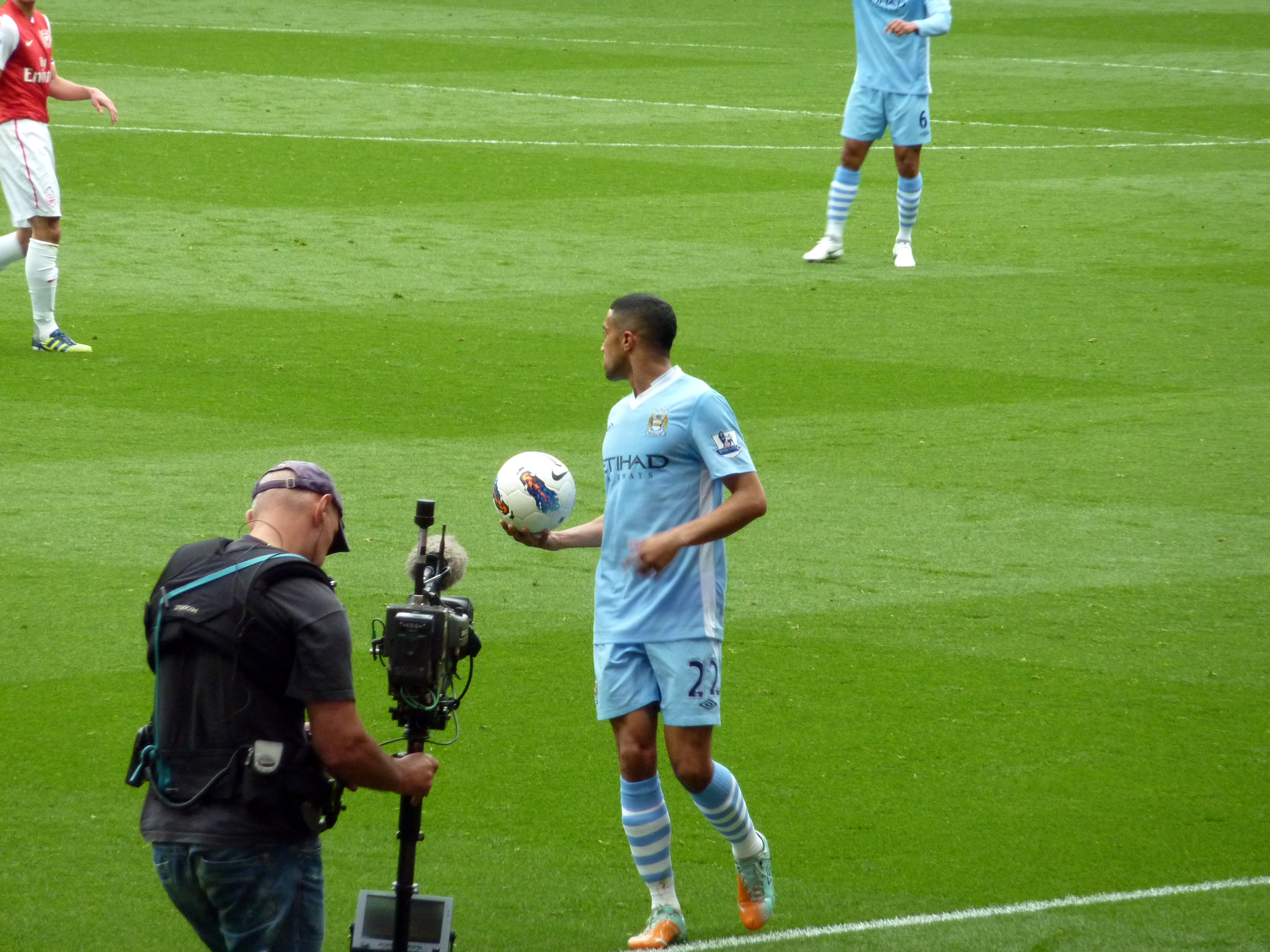
Clichy taking a throw-in for Manchester City in April 2012, against former club Arsenal

On 4 July 2011, it was confirmed that Manchester City had completed the signing of Clichy from Arsenal for an undisclosed fee, believed to be around £7 million, on a four-year deal. Clichy made his first appearance for City on the club's US Tour. He then made his first competitive appearance against Manchester United in the 2011 FA Community Shield and his first Premier League appearance against Swansea City. He was sent off during a league game against Chelsea for picking up a second yellow card for a challenge on Ramires. Clichy established himself as first choice left-back after beginning the season as backup to Aleksandar Kolarov. On 13 May 2012, the final day of the Premier League season, Clichy started and played the full 90 minutes against Queens Park Rangers at the City of Manchester Stadium in a 3–2 victory, on his 37th appearance of the campaign which ultimately handed City the title at the expense of rivals Manchester United. Clichy collected the second Premier League winner's medal of his career having won the other one with Arsenal after an Invincible 2003–04 season.

Clichy agreed a new four-year deal with City in May 2013 after penning a contract to keep him at the Etihad until 2017. "I'm really happy to have agreed a new deal with City and I'm already looking forward to next season", said Clichy. "Things didn't go the way we wanted them to this year but we'll come back stronger next season and learn from this experience." Clichy won another Premier League winner's medal in May 2014 as Manchester City held off the challenge of Liverpool to regain the Premier League title on the final day of the season. Clichy scored his first goal for Manchester City on 30 November 2014 in a 0–3 victory against Southampton at St Mary's Stadium.

On 25 May 2017, Manchester City announced that Clichy would be leaving the club.

=== İstanbul Başakşehir ===
On 7 July 2017, İstanbul Başakşehir announced that Clichy had passed the medical earlier that day, following which he signed a 3-year contract to play for the Turkish club.

On 19 July 2020, Clichy helped Başakşehir secure their first ever league title, providing the assist for the game's only goal in the club's win over Kayserispor on the penultimate day of the season.

=== Servette ===
On 2 December 2020, Clichy joined Servette of the Swiss Super League on a free transfer and a 18-month contract.

== International career ==
=== Youth ===
Clichy has earned caps with all of France's youth teams for which he was eligible. He was a late participant at under-15 level under coach Luc Rabat. Clichy made his youth international debut on 13 March 2001 in a 3–0 friendly win over Italy. He remained with the team for the rest of the campaign appearing in three matches at the 2001 edition of the Montaigu Tournament which France won. Clichy also played in all three matches at an international tournament in Salerno, Italy. At under-17 level, Clichy appeared in ten matches as France attempted to qualify for the 2002 UEFA European Under-17 Football Championship. He made his debut with the team on 19 September 2001 in its opening league match of the season; a 1–0 win over Yugoslavia. In qualifying for the UEFA-sanctioned tournament, Clichy appeared in two of the three qualification matches. In the tournament, he appeared in all six matches as the starting left-back. France reached the final, but were defeated by a resilient Switzerland, who were led by future Arsenal teammate Philippe Senderos.

Due to increased playing time at his parent club Cannes, Clichy's stint with the under-18 team was uneventful appearing in only three matches. He returned to the team as a regular for under-19 duty as the team was attempting to qualify for the 2004 UEFA European Under-19 Football Championship. In qualifying, France were surprisingly eliminated in the first round after finishing third in its first qualifying round group. Following the team's elimination, France only played in three more matches. Clichy played in the last two against Ukraine. He earned his first call up to the under-21 team under coach Raymond Domenech in the team's first match following the team's failure to qualify for the 2004 UEFA European Under-21 Football Championship against Belgium, which was a 1–0 victory. Despite featuring in the team as a starter early on, which included playing in every match in the team's triumph at the 2004 Toulon Tournament, as the season wore on, Clichy lost his starting left-back spot to Lyon prospect Jérémy Berthod. His last appearance with the team came on 15 November 2005 in the team's first leg playoff round tie against England, which determined which team would earn a berth in the 2006 UEFA European Under-21 Football Championship. Clichy started the first leg, but was substituted out for Berthod at half-time. France defeated England 3–2 on aggregate to earn a place in the tournament. However, due to his fractured foot injury suffered while playing with Arsenal, Clichy missed the competition.

=== Senior ===
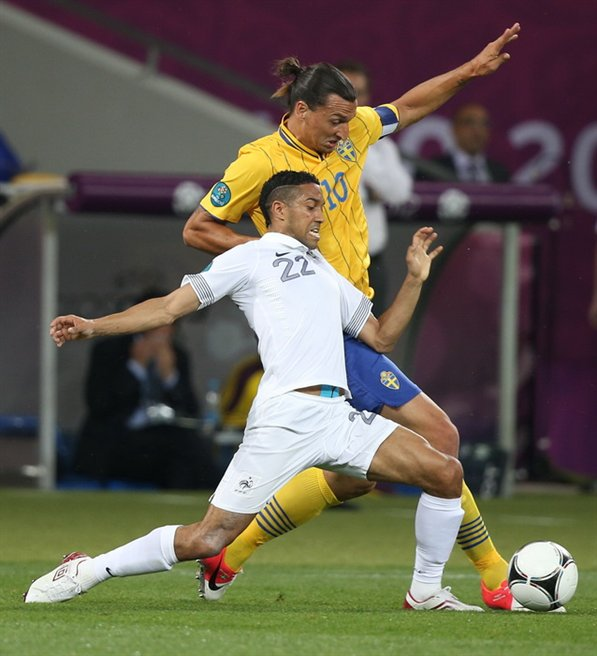
Clichy challenging for the ball with Zlatan Ibrahimović of Sweden at UEFA Euro 2012.

On 31 January 2008, Clichy was called up to the senior national team for the first time for the team's February 2008 match against Spain. However, he instead played for the B team in its friendly match against the Congo DR, held the day before the Spain friendly. After receiving several more call ups in 2008, Clichy finally earned his first cap on 10 September 2008 in a 2010 World Cup qualification match against Serbia. The following month, he appeared as a starter in 3–1 victories over Tunisia and Austria, the former match being a friendly and the latter being a World Cup qualifier. In the next year and a half, Clichy failed to represent France internationally. Despite this, he was named in Domenech's 30-man preliminary squad to participate in the 2010 FIFA World Cup. Clichy was later named in the 23-man team to serve as the backup for the incumbent starter Patrice Evra. At the competition, France endured a disastrous campaign as the players went on strike in response to its disagreement over the expulsion of striker Nicolas Anelka from the team. In the team's final group stage match against hosts South Africa, with several veteran players missing from the squad, Clichy was inserted as a starter and played the entire match in the team's 2–1 loss, which resulted in its elimination from the competition. As a result of the players' mutiny, Clichy, along with the 22 other members of the team, were suspended for the team's friendly match against Norway.

Due to the five-match suspension of Evra, new national team manager Laurent Blanc inserted Clichy as the starter. Following his first match since the World Cup against Belarus, Clichy was criticised for his defending; following a mix-up with Yann M'Vila, he failed to prevent Vyacheslav Hleb from providing the assist for the only goal of the match as France lost 1–0. Despite this setback, Clichy remained first-choice and featured in the team's next three matches. In November 2010, Clichy was benched in favour of Eric Abidal. Following Abidal's diagnosis of a tumor on his liver, Evra returned to the team and was given the starting left-back spot in his first match back. Clichy later admitted that he was frustrated by the decision, but respected the manager's choice. In June 2012, he was named in the 23-man France squad and given the number 22 shirt to compete at UEFA Euro 2012 in Poland and Ukraine as a substitute for Evra. He played the last two group matches against Ukraine and Sweden, as well as the 2–0 loss against Spain in the quarter-final at the tournament.

== Style of play ==
Predominantly left-footed but naturally right-footed, he was described earlier in his career as a player who possessed "almost unrivaled stamina" that was "quick in the tackle and willing to drive forward".

== Coaching career ==
=== France U-21 ===
In August 2023, Clichy was appointed assistant coach to his former teammate Thierry Henry at the head of the French junior team and the French Olympic team.

=== Caen ===
On 29 December 2025, Clichy got his first job as head coach, taking charge of Championnat National club Caen.

== Sponsorship ==
In 2012, Clichy signed a sponsorship deal with German sportswear and footwear supplier, Puma SE. He followed the likes of former teammates Sergio Agüero and Yaya Touré wearing the evoSPEED range of football boots. Clichy was formerly with British brand Umbro and its Stealth silo.

== Career statistics ==
=== Club ===
Appearances and goals by club, season and competition
Club	Season	League			National cup (Note: Includes Coupe de France, FA Cup, Turkish Cup, Swiss Cup)		League cup (Note: Includes Coupe de la Ligue, Football League/EFL Cup)		Europe		Other		Total	
Club	Season	Division	Apps	Goals	Apps	Goals	Apps	Goals	Apps	Goals	Apps	Goals	Apps	Goals
Cannes	2002–03	Championnat National	15	2	0	0	0	0	—		—		15	2
Arsenal	2003–04	Premier League	12	0	4	0	5	0	1 (Note: Appearance(s) in UEFA Champions League)	0	—		22	0
Arsenal	2004–05	Premier League	15	0	5	0	1	0	2	0	1 (Note: Appearance in FA Community Shield)	0	24	0
Arsenal	2005–06	Premier League	7	0	0	0	0	0	4	0	—		11	0
Arsenal	2006–07	Premier League	27	0	5	0	2	0	6	0	—		40	0
Arsenal	2007–08	Premier League	38	0	1	0	0	0	10	0	—		49	0
Arsenal	2008–09	Premier League	31	1	0	0	0	0	10	0	—		41	1
Arsenal	2009–10	Premier League	24	0	0	0	0	0	9	0	—		33	0
Arsenal	2010–11	Premier League	33	0	2	1	3	0	6	0	—		44	1
Arsenal	Total		187	1	17	1	11	0	48	0	1	0	264	2
Manchester City	2011–12	Premier League	28	0	0	0	1	0	7 (Note: Four appearances in UEFA Champions League, three appearances in UEFA Europa League)	0	1	0	37	0
Manchester City	2012–13	Premier League	28	0	4	0	0	0	4	0	1	0	37	0
Manchester City	2013–14	Premier League	20	0	4	0	3	0	4	0	—		31	0
Manchester City	2014–15	Premier League	23	1	1	0	0	0	6	0	1	0	31	1
Manchester City	2015–16	Premier League	14	0	2	0	4	0	8	0	—		28	0
Manchester City	2016–17	Premier League	25	1	5	0	2	1	7	0	—		39	2
Manchester City	Total		138	2	16	0	10	1	36	0	3	0	203	3
İstanbul Başakşehir	2017–18	Süper Lig	31	0	1	0	—		9 (Note: Appearances in UEFA Europa League)	0	—		41	0
İstanbul Başakşehir	2018–19	Süper Lig	25	1	0	0	—		2	0	—		27	1
İstanbul Başakşehir	2019–20	Süper Lig	31	2	2	0	—		12 (Note: Two appearances in UEFA Champions League, ten appearances in UEFA Europa League)	0	—		45	2
İstanbul Başakşehir	Total		87	3	3	0	—		23	0	—		113	3
Servette	2020–21	Swiss Super League	23	0	1	0	—		—		—		24	0
Servette	2021–22	Swiss Super League	29	0	0	0	—		2	0	—		31	0
Servette	2022–23	Swiss Super League	27	1	1	0	—		—		—		28	1
Servette	Total		79	1	2	0	—		2	0	—		83	1
Career total			506	7	38	1	21	1	109	0	4	0	676	9

=== International ===
As of 11 October 2013

Appearances and goals by national team and year
National team	Year	Apps	Goals
France	2008	2	0
France	2009	1	0
France	2010	6	0
France	2011	2	0
France	2012	5	0
France	2013	4	0
Total		20	0

=== Managerial statistics ===
As of 13 February 2026

Managerial record by team and tenure
Team	From	To	Record				
Team	From	To	G	W	D	L	Win %
Caen	29 December 2025	present	5	1	3	1	20.00
Career total			5	1	3	1	20.00

== Honours ==
Arsenal

- Premier League: 2003–04
- FA Community Shield: 2004
- Football League Cup runner-up: 2010–11
- UEFA Champions League runner-up: 2005–06

Manchester City

- Premier League: 2011–12, 2013–14
- Football League Cup: 2013–14, 2015–16
- FA Community Shield: 2012
- FA Cup runner-up: 2012–13

Istanbul Basaksehir

- Süper Lig: 2019–20

France U21

- Toulon Tournament: 2004

Individual

- PFA Team of the Year: 2007–08 Premier League
