= Boubacar Fofana =

Boubacar Fofana may refer to:

- Boubacar Fofana (footballer, born 1989), Guinean football defensive midfielder
- Boubacar Fofana (footballer, born 1998), French football winger
