= Vincent Sasso =

French footballer (born 1991)

Personal information
- Full name: Vincent Julien Sasso
- Date of birth: 16 February 1991 (age 35)
- Place of birth: Saint-Cloud, France
- Height: 1.90 m (6 ft 3 in)
- Position: Centre-back

Team information
- Current team: Le Havre
- Number: 23

Youth career
- 1998–2000: FC 92
- 2000–2004: Paris Saint-Germain
- 2004–2006: Boulogne-Billancourt
- 2006–2010: Nantes

Senior career*
Years	Team	Apps	(Gls)
2010–2012	Nantes	24	(0)
2012–2013	Beira-Mar	15	(2)
2013–2016	Braga	17	(0)
2013–2014	Braga B	7	(2)
2015–2016	→ Sheffield Wednesday (loan)	14	(0)
2016–2017	Sheffield Wednesday	14	(2)
2017–2018	Belenenses	18	(1)
2018–2019	B-SAD	29	(3)
2019–2022	Servette	84	(2)
2022–2024	Boavista	41	(6)
2024–2026	Dunkerque	56	(7)
2026–	Le Havre	3	(0)

International career
2006–2007	France U16	1	(0)
2007–2008	France U17	5	(0)
2008–2009	France U18	2	(0)
2009–2010	France U19	6	(0)
2010–2011	France U20	2	(0)
2011	France U21	1	(0)
- * Club domestic league appearances and goals as of 15:56, 20 September 2026 (UTC)

Vincent Julien Sasso (born 16 February 1991) is a French professional footballer who plays as a centre-back for Ligue 1 club Le Havre.

== Club career ==
Sasso was born in Saint-Cloud, Paris. On 18 June 2008, he signed his first professional contract with FC Nantes. He made his professional debut on 31 July 2010 in a 4–2 penalty shootout away loss against US Boulogne in the first round of the Coupe de la Ligue, and went on to spend two seasons with the first team in Ligue 2, contributing 20 games to a 13th place in 2010–11.

In summer 2012, Sasso joined S.C. Beira-Mar in Portugal for three years. He scored his first Primeira Liga goal for the Aveiro side on 6 October, putting the visitors ahead in an eventual 2–1 defeat at S.L. Benfica. They went on to suffer relegation, but he had already left in late January 2013 to S.C. Braga, on a contract until June 2017.

On 30 June 2015, Sasso was loaned to Championship club Sheffield Wednesday in a season-long move. After making only 18 competitive appearances, he left.

In August 2016, Sasso rejoined Wednesday after signing a permanent one-year contract. He returned to Portugal and its top division the following off-season, agreeing to a two-year deal at C.F. Os Belenenses as a free agent; he also represented the renamed B-SAD.

Sasso moved to the Swiss Super League on 17 June 2019, signing with Servette FC for three seasons. He played his first match in the competition on 21 July in a 1–1 draw away to BSC Young Boys, and scored his first goal on 31 August as the hosts drew 2–2 against Neuchâtel Xamax FCS after being 2–0 down.

On 7 June 2022, Sasso returned to the Portuguese top tier, on a two-year contract at Boavista FC. He scored a career-best four league goals in his debut campaign from 27 official games, but subsequently played second-fiddle to Rodrigo Abascal and Chidozie Awaziem.

Sasso went back to France in July 2024 after 12 years away, joining second-tier USL Dunkerque. The 35-year-old reached the Ligue 1 in 2026–27, agreeing to a contract at Le Havre AC and making his debut in the tournament on 23 August 2026 in a 0–1 home loss against AS Monaco FC.

== International career ==
Sasso won caps for France at youth level. His only for the under-21s was on 2 June 2011, as a late substitute in the 1–0 friendly win over Serbia in Rouen.

== Career statistics ==
As of 19 September 2026

Appearances and goals by club, season and competition
Club	Season	League			National cup		League cup		Other		Total	
Club	Season	Division	Apps	Goals	Apps	Goals	Apps	Goals	Apps	Goals	Apps	Goals
Nantes	2010–11	Ligue 2	20	0	4	0	1	0	—		25	0
Nantes	2011–12	Ligue 2	4	0	2	0	0	0	—		6	0
Nantes	Total		24	0	6	0	1	0	—		31	0
Beira-Mar	2012–13	Primeira Liga	15	2	2	0	5	0	—		22	2
Braga	2012–13	Primeira Liga	5	0	0	0	1	0	0	0	6	0
Braga	2013–14	Primeira Liga	7	0	1	0	3	1	0	0	11	1
Braga	2014–15	Primeira Liga	5	0	3	0	3	1	—		11	1
Braga	Total		17	0	4	0	7	2	0	0	28	2
Braga B	2013–14	Segunda Liga	6	2	—		—		—		6	2
Braga B	2014–15	Segunda Liga	1	0	—		—		—		1	0
Braga B	Total		7	2	—		—		—		7	2
Sheffield Wednesday (loan)	2015–16	EFL Championship	14	0	2	0	2	0	—		18	0
Sheffield Wednesday	2016–17	EFL Championship	14	2	0	0	0	0	—		14	2
Sheffield Wednesday	Total		28	2	2	0	2	0	—		32	2
Belenenses	2017–18	Primeira Liga	18	1	0	0	1	0	—		19	1
B-SAD	2018–19	Primeira Liga	29	3	2	0	3	0	—		34	3
Servette	2019–20	Swiss Super League	32	1	1	0	—		—		33	1
Servette	2020–21	Swiss Super League	22	0	2	0	—		2 (Note: Appearances in UEFA Europa League)	0	26	0
Servette	2021–22	Swiss Super League	30	1	0	0	—		2 (Note: Appearances in UEFA Europa Conference League)	0	32	1
Servette	Total		84	2	3	0	—		4	0	91	2
Boavista	2022–23	Primeira Liga	24	4	1	0	2	0	—		27	4
Boavista	2023–24	Primeira Liga	17	2	1	0	0	0	—		18	2
Boavista	Total		41	6	2	0	2	0	—		45	6
Dunkerque	2024–25	Ligue 2	31	3	4	2	—		2 (Note: Appearances in Ligue 2 promotion play-offs)	0	37	5
Dunkerque	2025–26	Ligue 2	25	4	2	0	—		—		27	4
Dunkerque	Total		56	7	6	2	—		2	0	64	9
Le Havre	2026–27	Ligue 1	3	0	0	0	—		—		3	0
Career total			322	25	27	2	21	2	6	0	376	29

== Honours ==
Braga

- Taça da Liga: 2012–13
