= Grejohn Kyei =

French footballer (born 1995)

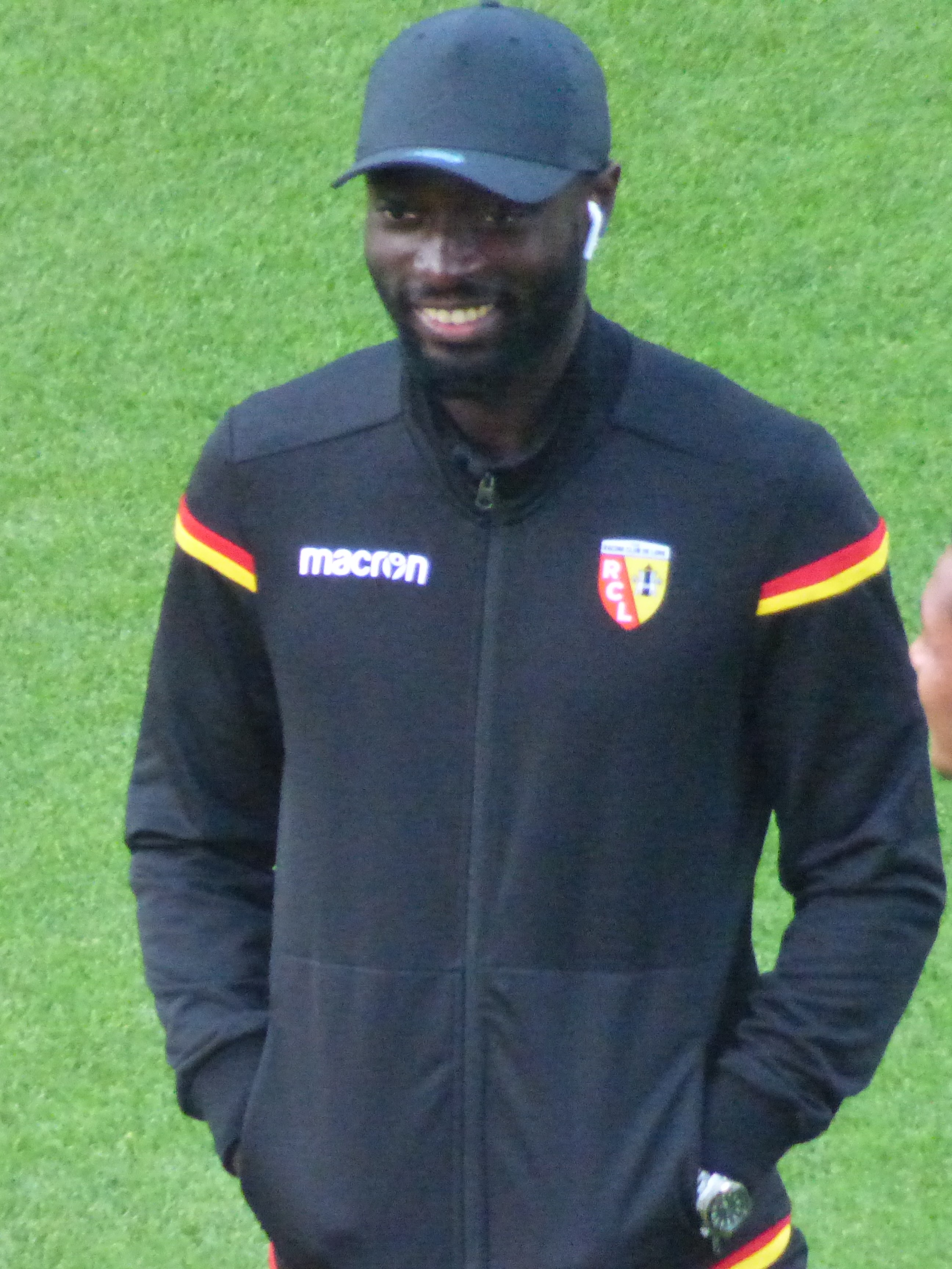
- Kyei with Lens in 2018

Personal information
- Date of birth: 12 August 1995 (age 31)
- Place of birth: Gonesse, France
- Height: 1.87 m (6 ft 2 in)
- Position: Striker

Team information
- Current team: Standard Liège
- Number: 95

Youth career
- 2003–2010: Villiers Le Bel JS
- 2010–2015: Reims

Senior career*
Years	Team	Apps	(Gls)
2013–2018	Reims B	19	(14)
2015–2019	Reims	75	(13)
2018–2019	→ Lens (loan)	20	(4)
2018	→ Lens B (loan)	1	(0)
2019–2022	Servette	72	(22)
2022–2024	Clermont	77	(12)
2024–2026	Standard Liège	6	(0)
2024–2025	→ Charleroi (loan)	12	(1)
2026	SL16 FC	4	(3)

International career
2015	France U21	1	(1)
- * Club domestic league appearances and goals as of 23 May 2026

Grejohn Kyei (born 12 August 1995) is a French professional footballer who plays as a striker.

== Club career ==
Kyei is a product of the youth academy of Reims. He made his Ligue 1 debut on 12 April 2015 against Nice replacing Nicolas de Préville after 74 minutes in a 1–0 home defeat.

Kyei helped Reims win the 2017–18 Ligue 2 and promote to the Ligue 1 for the 2018–19 season.

In August 2018, Kyei joined Ligue 2 club Lens on loan for the season with Lens securing an option to sign him permanently.

In August 2019, Kyei joined Swiss Super League club Servette on a three-year contract.

On 31 January 2022, Kyei returned to France and signed with Ligue 1 side Clermont until the end of the 2021–22 season.

Having suffered relegation with Clermont in 2023–24, on 3 July 2024 Kyei moved to Belgian club Standard Liège, signing a three-year contract. On 6 September 2024, Kyei was loaned by Charleroi, with an option to buy. On 30 July 2026, his contract with Standard was terminated.

== International career ==
Kyei was born in France and is of Ghanaian descent. He is a one-time youth international for France.

== Career statistics ==
As of match played 12 May 2024

Appearances and goals by club, season and competition
Club	Season	League			National cup		League cup		Other		Total	
Club	Season	Division	Apps	Goals	Apps	Goals	Apps	Goals	Apps	Goals	Apps	Goals
Reims B	2013–14	CFA 2	17	12	—		—		—		17	12
Reims B	2017–18	National 2	2	2	—		—		—		2	2
Reims B	Total		19	14	—		—		—		19	14
Reims	2014–15	Ligue 1	3	1	1	1	0	0	—		4	2
Reims	2015–16	Ligue 1	16	3	0	0	1	0	—		17	3
Reims	2016–17	Ligue 2	28	6	2	2	1	1	—		31	9
Reims	2017–18	Ligue 2	27	3	2	0	2	0	—		31	3
Reims	2018–19	Ligue 1	1	0	0	0	0	0	—		1	0
Reims	Total		75	13	5	3	4	1	—		84	17
Lens (loan)	2018–19	Ligue 2	20	4	3	1	0	0	1 (Note: Appearance in the Ligue 1 relegation/promotion play-offs)	0	24	5
Lens B (loan)	2018–19	National 2	1	0	—		—		—		1	0
Servette	2019–20	Swiss Super League	23	4	1	0	—		—		24	4
Servette	2020–21	Swiss Super League	33	12	3	2	—		0	0	36	14
Servette	2021–22	Swiss Super League	16	6	2	0	—		0	0	18	6
Servette	Total		72	22	6	2	—		0	0	78	24
Clermont	2021–22	Ligue 1	14	0	0	0	—		—		14	0
Clermont	2022–23	Ligue 1	37	10	1	0	—		—		38	10
Clermont	2023–24	Ligue 1	26	2	1	0	—		—		27	2
Clermont	Total		77	12	2	0	—		—		79	12
Career total			264	65	16	6	4	1	1	0	285	72

== Honours ==
Reims

- Ligue 2: 2017–18
