= Boris Céspedes =

Bolivian footballer (born 1995)

Personal information
- Full name: Boris Adrián Céspedes
- Date of birth: 19 June 1995 (age 31)
- Place of birth: Santa Cruz de la Sierra, Bolivia
- Height: 1.82 m (6 ft 0 in)
- Position: Midfielder

Team information
- Current team: Étoile Carouge
- Number: 10

Youth career
- 2003–2013: Servette

Senior career*
| Years | Team | Apps | (Gls) |
| 2013–2023 | Servette | 156 | (10) |
| 2014–2016 | → Étoile Carouge (loan) | 11 | (1) |
| 2023–2025 | Yverdon Sport | 60 | (12) |
| 2026– | Étoile Carouge | 4 | (0) |

International career^{‡}
| 2013–2014 | Switzerland U19 | 4 | (0) |
| 2020– | Bolivia | 19 | (1) |
- * Club domestic league appearances and goals as of 18 September 2026 ‡ National team caps and goals as of 23:20, 1 July 2024 (UTC)

Boris Adrián Céspedes (born 19 June 1995) is a Bolivian professional footballer who plays as a midfielder for Swiss Challenge League club Étoile Carouge and the Bolivia national team.

== Professional career ==
A youth product of Servette FC, Céspedes debuted with the first team in 2013. He made his professional debut with Servette in a 1–1 draw with BSC Young Boys in the Swiss Super League on 21 July 2019.

In 2014, Céspedes announce official loan transfer to Étoile Carouge.

In 2023, Yverdon Sport announce join of Céspedes for 2023–24 season.

In March 2025, Céspedes was banned for two years by FIFA for using a banned drug acetazolamide. The ban was reduced to 15 months eventually by the Court of Arbitration for Sport.

== International career ==
Céspedes was born in Bolivia and raised in Switzerland. He was a youth international for Switzerland. On 9 October 2020, he debuted for the Bolivia national team in a 5–0 loss to Brazil in a 2022 World Cup qualifying match.

== Career statistics ==
=== Club ===
As of the match played 27 May 2025

Appearances and goals by club, season and competition
| Club | Season | League | | | Cup | | Continental | | Total | |
| Club | Season | Division | Apps | Goals | Apps | Goals | Apps | Goals | Apps | Goals |
|---|---|---|---|---|---|---|---|---|---|---|
| Servette | 2013–14 | Swiss Challenge League | 10 | 1 | 0 | 0 | — | | 10 | 1 |
| Servette | 2014–15 | Swiss Challenge League | 5 | 0 | 1 | 0 | — | | 6 | 0 |
| Servette | 2016–17 | Swiss Challenge League | 14 | 2 | 0 | 0 | — | | 14 | 2 |
| Servette | 2017–18 | Swiss Challenge League | 16 | 1 | 1 | 0 | — | | 17 | 1 |
| Servette | 2018–19 | Swiss Challenge League | 17 | 1 | 1 | 0 | — | | 18 | 1 |
| Servette | 2019–20 | Swiss Super League | 28 | 3 | 1 | 0 | — | | 29 | 3 |
| Servette | 2020–21 | Swiss Super League | 27 | 1 | 1 | 0 | 1 (Note: Appearances in UEFA Europa League) | 0 | 29 | 1 |
| Servette | 2021–22 | Swiss Super League | 22 | 1 | 2 | 0 | 2 (Note: Appearances in UEFA Champions League) | 0 | 26 | 1 |
| Servette | 2022–23 | Swiss Super League | 17 | 0 | 3 | 0 | 0 | 0 | 20 | 0 |
| Servette | Total | | 156 | 10 | 10 | 0 | 3 | 0 | 169 | 10 |
| Yverdon-Sport | 2023–24 | Swiss Super League | 36 | 6 | 0 | 0 | — | | 36 | 6 |
| Yverdon-Sport | 2024–25 | Swiss Super League | 24 | 6 | 2 | 2 | — | | 26 | 8 |
| Yverdon-Sport | 2025–26 | Swiss Challenge League | 0 | 0 | 0 | 0 | — | | 0 | 0 |
| Yverdon-Sport | Total | | 60 | 12 | 2 | 2 | — | | 62 | 14 |
| Career total | | | 216 | 22 | 12 | 2 | 3 | 0 | 231 | 24 |

=== International ===
As of match played 1 July 2024

Appearances and goals by national team and year
| National team | Year | Apps | Goals |
|---|---|---|---|
| Bolivia | 2020 | 3 | 1 |
| Bolivia | 2021 | 4 | 0 |
| Bolivia | 2023 | 6 | 0 |
| Bolivia | 2024 | 6 | 0 |
| Total | | 19 | 1 |

=== International goals ===
Scores and results list Bolivia's goal tally first.

| No | Date | Venue | Opponent | Score | Result | Competition |
|---|---|---|---|---|---|---|
| 1. | 17 November 2020 | Estadio Defensores del Chaco, Asunción, Paraguay | Paraguay | 2–1 | 2–2 | 2022 FIFA World Cup qualification |
Last updated 3 May 2021
