= Matteo Regillo =

Swiss footballer (born 2002)

Personal information
- Date of birth: 24 April 2002 (age 24)
- Place of birth: Geneva, Switzerland
- Height: 1.71 m (5 ft 7 in)
- Position: Forward

Team information
- Current team: Nyon
- Number: 91

Youth career
- 2011–2016: Étoile Carouge
- 2016–2020: Servete

Senior career*
Years	Team	Apps	(Gls)
2019–2023	Servette U21	11	(12)
2020–2023	Servette	1	(0)
2021–2022	→ Étoile Carouge (loan)	24	(1)
2023	Breitenrain Bern	12	(0)
2023–2024	Meyrin	27	(15)
2024	Lausanne-Sport II	11	(1)
2025–2026	FC Grand-Saconnex	48	(30)
2026–	Nyon	9	(1)

International career^{‡}
2018	Switzerland U17	4	(1)
- * Club domestic league appearances and goals as of 18 September 2026 ‡ National team caps and goals as of 13 August 2020

Matteo Regillo (born 24 April 2002) is a Swiss professional footballer who plays as a forward for Swiss Challenge League club Nyon.

== Professional career ==
On 2 June 2020, Regillo signed a professional contract with Servette FC until 2023. Regillo made his professional debut with Servette in a 2-1 Swiss Super League loss to FC Sion on 3 August 2020.

On 20 July 2021, he joined Étoile Carouge on a season-long loan.
