= Alexis Martial =

French footballer (born 2001)

Personal information
- Date of birth: 15 June 2001 (age 25)
- Place of birth: Paris, France
- Height: 1.76 m (5 ft 9 in)
- Positions: Right-back; defensive midfielder

Team information
- Current team: Lège-Cap-Ferret

Youth career
- 2007–2011: FC Écouen
- 2011–2014: AAS Sarcelles
- 2014–2019: Lyon

Senior career*
Years	Team	Apps	(Gls)
2019	Lyon B	1	(0)
2019–2021	Servette U21	16	(0)
2020–2021	Servette	4	(0)
2022–2023	Reims Sainte-Anne	16	(2)
2023–2025	Orléans B	49	(0)
2025–2026	Saint-Pryvé Saint-Hilaire	12	(0)
2026–	Lège-Cap-Ferret	3	(0)

International career^{‡}
2026–	Saint Martin	2	(0)
- * Club domestic league appearances and goals as of 7 November 2026 ‡ National team caps and goals as of 17 November 2026

Alexis Martial (born 15 June 2001) is a professional footballer who plays as a right-back for National 2 club Lège-Cap-Ferret. Born in the continental France, he plays for the Saint Martin national team.

== Club career ==
Martial grew up in Val-d'Oise, and began playing football in the youth department of FC Écouen as a seven-year-old before moving to AAS Sarcelles. At 13, he joined the Lyon academy, where coaches like Cyril Dolce and Armand Garrido helped shape his technical and tactical development as a versatile defender. In 2019, he signed with Servette in Switzerland, making his professional debut on 4 July 2020, replacing Gaël Ondoua in the 86th minute of a 2–0 Swiss Super League loss to FC Zürich.

After departing Servette in 2021, Martial experienced a period without a club but remained active by training with teams such as Versailles, FC 93, and his former club Sarcelles. In 2022, he participated in the UNFP FC summer camp, playing against Ligue 1 and Ligue 2 teams, which reignited his drive to return to professional football. Shortly thereafter, he signed with EF Reims Sainte-Anne, a club in National 3.

In 2023, Martial joined Orléans' reserves, competing in National 3. He evolved into captain for the reserve team.

On 7 June 2025, Martial signed with National 2 club Saint-Pryvé Saint-Hilaire.

== International career ==
Martial made his debut for the Saint Martin national team on 13 November 2026 in a CONCACAF Nations League game against El Salvador.

== Style of play ==
Known for his versatility, Martial can play as a defensive midfielder, centre-back, or right-back, and is noted for his physicality, ball-winning ability, and capacity to advance play.

== Personal life ==
Martial is the cousin of Johan Martial and former Manchester United forward Anthony Martial.

== Career statistics ==
As of match played 10 May 2025

Appearances and goals by club, season and competition
Club	Season	League			National cup		Other		Total	
Club	Season	Division	Apps	Goals	Apps	Goals	Apps	Goals	Apps	Goals
Lyon B	2018–19	National 2	1	0	—		—		1	0
Servette U21	2019–20	2. Liga Interregional	13	0	—		—		13	0
Servette U21	2020–21	2. Liga Interregional	3	0	—		—		3	0
Servette U21	Total		16	0	—		—		16	6
Servette	2019–20	Swiss Super League	2	0	0	0	—		2	0
Servette	2020–21	Swiss Super League	2	0	0	0	—		2	0
Servette	Total		4	0	0	0	—		4	0
Reims Sainte-Anne	2022–23	National 3	16	2	3	0	—		19	2
Orléans B	2023–24	National 3	24	0	0	0	—		24	0
Orléans B	2024–25	National 3	25	0	3	0	—		28	0
Orléans B	Total		49	0	3	0	—		52	0
Saint-Pryvé Saint-Hilaire	2025–26	National 2	0	0	0	0	—		0	0
Career total			86	2	6	0	0	0	92	2
