= Matteo Mazzolini =

French footballer (born 2001)

Personal information
- Date of birth: 9 January 2001 (age 25)
- Place of birth: Saint-Quentin, France
- Height: 1.78 m (5 ft 10 in)
- Position: Midfielder

Team information
- Current team: Vimy

Youth career
- 2006–2009: Dainvillois
- 2009–2019: Lens
- 2019–2020: Servette

Senior career*
Years	Team	Apps	(Gls)
2019–2020	Servette U21	12	(1)
2020–2021	Servette	2	(0)
2021–2022	Béthune		
2022–2023	Le Touquet		
2023–2024	Grenoble II		
2024–	Vimy	4	(0)

International career^{‡}
2017	France U17	5	(0)
- * Club domestic league appearances and goals as of 21 September 2024 ‡ National team caps and goals as of 26 July 2020

Matteo Mazzolini (born 9 January 2001) is a French footballer who plays as a midfielder for Championnat National 3 club Vimy.

== Playing career ==
Mazzolini made his professional debut with Servette FC in a 5–1 Swiss Super League loss to FC Thun on 22 July 2020.
