= Birama Ndoye =

Mauritanian footballer

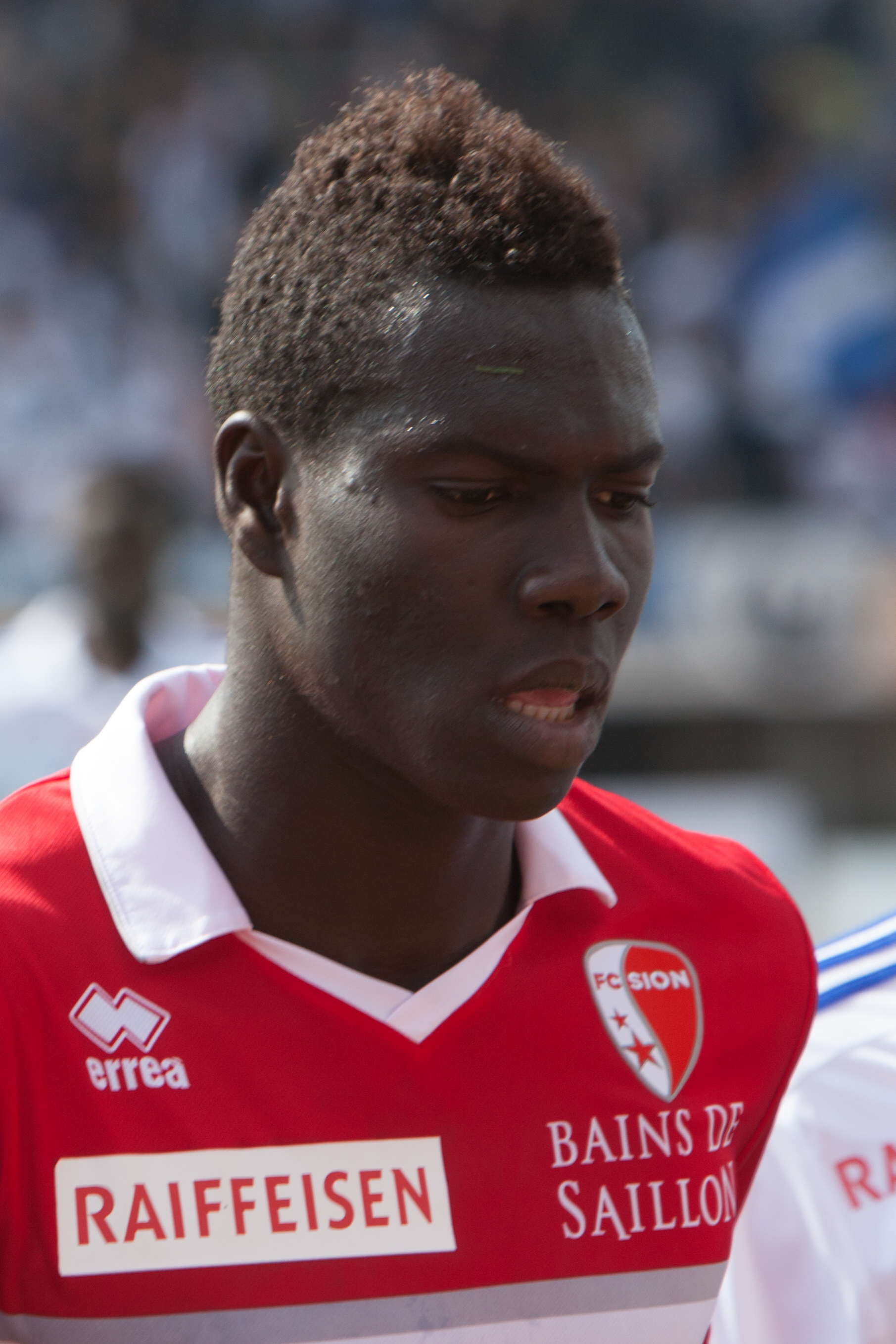

Personal information
- Full name: Birama Ndoye
- Date of birth: 27 March 1994 (age 32)
- Place of birth: Dakar, Senegal
- Height: 1.87 m (6 ft 2 in)
- Positions: Centre back; defensive midfielder

Youth career
- 2012–2013: Sion

Senior career*
Years	Team	Apps	(Gls)
2013–2022	Sion	211	(9)
2022–2023	Al-Arabi	32	(1)

International career^{‡}
2023–	Mauritania	2	(0)
- * Club domestic league appearances and goals as of 06:06, 31 March 2023 (UTC) ‡ National team caps and goals as of 06:06, 31 March 2023 (UTC)

Birama Ndoye (born 27 March 1994) is a footballer who plays as a centre back or defensive midfield. Born in France, he plays for the Mauritania national team.

== Club career ==
He grew up in Dakar with the dream of being a professional footballer. His father wanted him to make studies, but joined the junior club of "L'étoile sportive de Dakar", and his good performances made him climb to the professional team.

To continue his progression, Ndoye left his continent and family, and went in Europe. He made a few tests in Italian (Parma & Empoli) but they could not find a deal. FC Sion give him his chance and he joined the M21 team. The number 34 made about 20 games in Promotion League and scored two goals. He made his Swiss Super League debut at 25 May 2013 against FC Thun. He played the full game.

On 7 July 2022, Ndoye joined Saudi Arabian club Al-Arabi.

== International career ==
Born in Senegal, Ndoye is Mauritanian by descent. He debuted with the Mauritania national team in a 3–1 2023 Africa Cup of Nations qualification loss to DR Congo on 24 March 2023.
