= Robin Busset =

Malagasy footballer (born 2003)

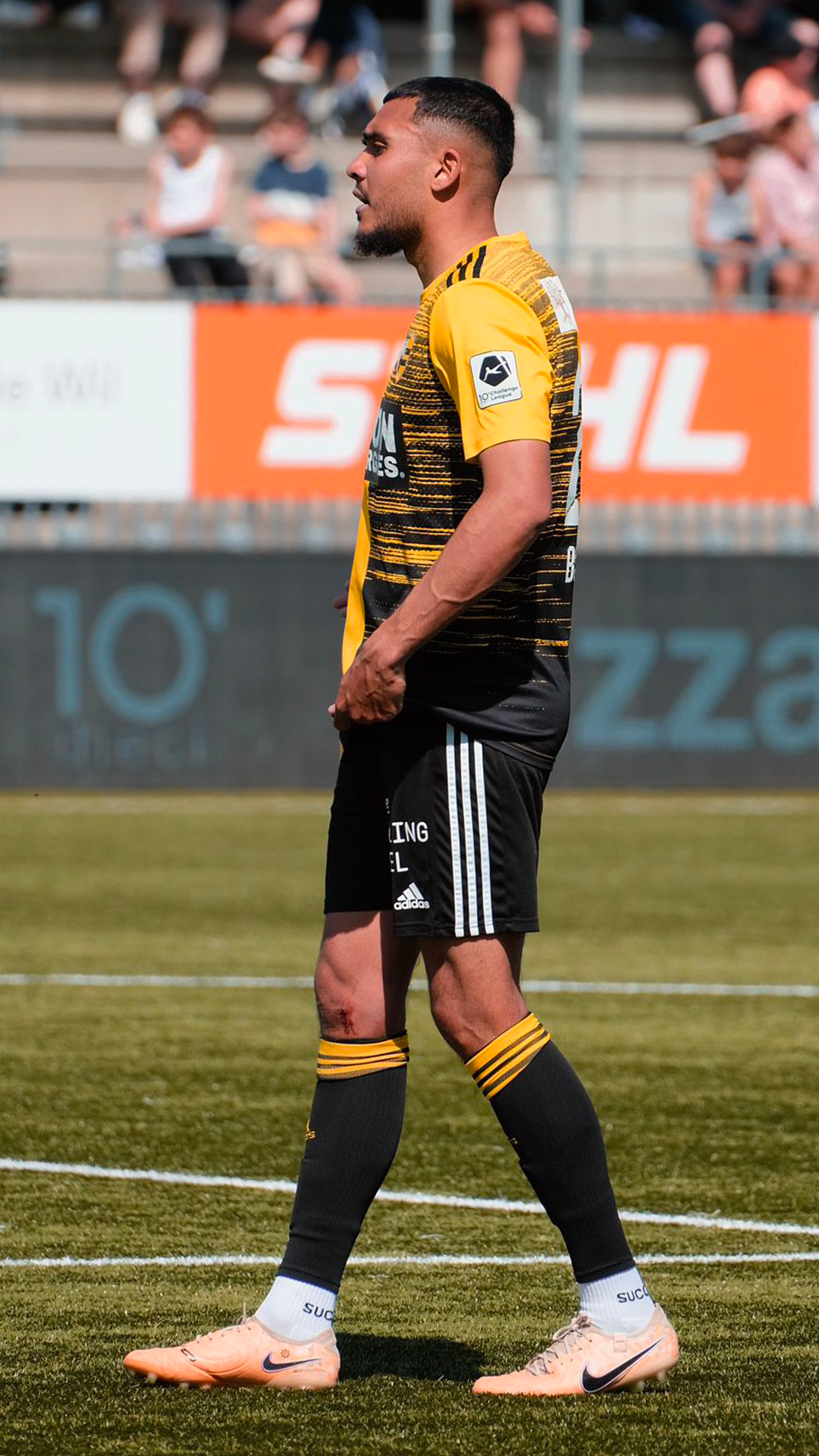
- Busset in 2024

Personal information
- Full name: Robin Fomendraza Busset
- Date of birth: 25 February 2000 (age 26)
- Place of birth: Geneva, Switzerland
- Height: 1.86 m (6 ft 1 in)
- Position: Left-back

Team information
- Current team: Yverdon-Sport
- Number: 33

Youth career
- 2005–2007: CS Chênois
- 2007–2010: Étoile Carouge
- 2010–2017: Servette

Senior career*
Years	Team	Apps	(Gls)
2017–2020	Servette II	14	(0)
2018–2021	Servette	18	(1)
2020–2021	→ Kriens (loan)	11	(1)
2021–2022	Kriens	43	(0)
2022–2025	Stade Nyonnais	76	(2)
2025–	Yverdon-Sport	1	(0)

International career^{‡}
2016	Switzerland U16	1	(0)
2017	Switzerland U17	1	(0)
2018	Switzerland U19	1	(0)
2024–	Madagascar	1	(0)
- * Club domestic league appearances and goals as of 6 October 2025 ‡ National team caps and goals as of 13:53, 6 June 2025 (UTC)

Robin Fomendraza Busset (born 25 February 2000) is a professional footballer who plays as a left-back for Swiss Challenge League club Yverdon-Sport. Born in Switzerland, he plays for the Madagascar national team.

== Club career ==
Busset is a product of the youth academies of the Swiss clubs CS Chênois, Étoile Carouge and Servette. In 2017 he signed his first professional contract with Servette. On 24 March 2018, he made his senior and professional debut with Servette in a 2-0 Swiss Challenge League win over FC Wohlen. In February 2020, he was loaned to Kriens. On 31 August 2020, his loan was extended and he ended up staying with Kriens as his contract ran out. On 17 September 2022, he transferred to Stade Nyonnais on a 3-year contract.

== International career ==
Busset was born in Switzerland to a Swiss father and Malagasy mother. He is a former youth international for Switzerland, having played up to the Switzerland U19s. He was called up to the Madagascar national team for a friendly tournament in March 2024, debuting in a 1–0 win over Burundi on March 22.
