= Papu Mendes =

Bissau-Guinean footballer

Personal information
- Full name: Papu Diocabre Mendes
- Date of birth: 1 October 2000 (age 26)
- Place of birth: Bissau, Guinea Bissau
- Height: 1.72 m (5 ft 8 in)
- Position: Midfielder

Youth career
- 2016–2017: Strasbourg

Senior career*
Years	Team	Apps	(Gls)
2017–2021	Strasbourg II	34	(1)
2021–2022	Servette II	9	(2)
2021–2022	Servette	3	(0)
2023	Zemplín Michalovce	3	(0)
2024–2025	Unia Turza Śląska	12	(4)
- * Club domestic league appearances and goals as of 17:06, 18 June 2025 (UTC)

Papu Diocabre Mendes (born 1 October 2000) is a Bissau-Guinean professional footballer who plays as a midfielder.

== Career ==
A youth product of Strasbourg, Mendes began his career with their reserves in the Championnat National 3. He transferred to Servette in Switzerland on 22 June 2021. He made his professional debut with Servette in a 3–0 UEFA Europa Conference League loss to Molde on 22 July 2021.

== International career ==
Born in Guinea Bissau, Mendes holds a Portuguese passport and was called up to train with the Portugal U19s in 2019.
