= Joël Kiassumbua =

Congolese footballer (born 1992)

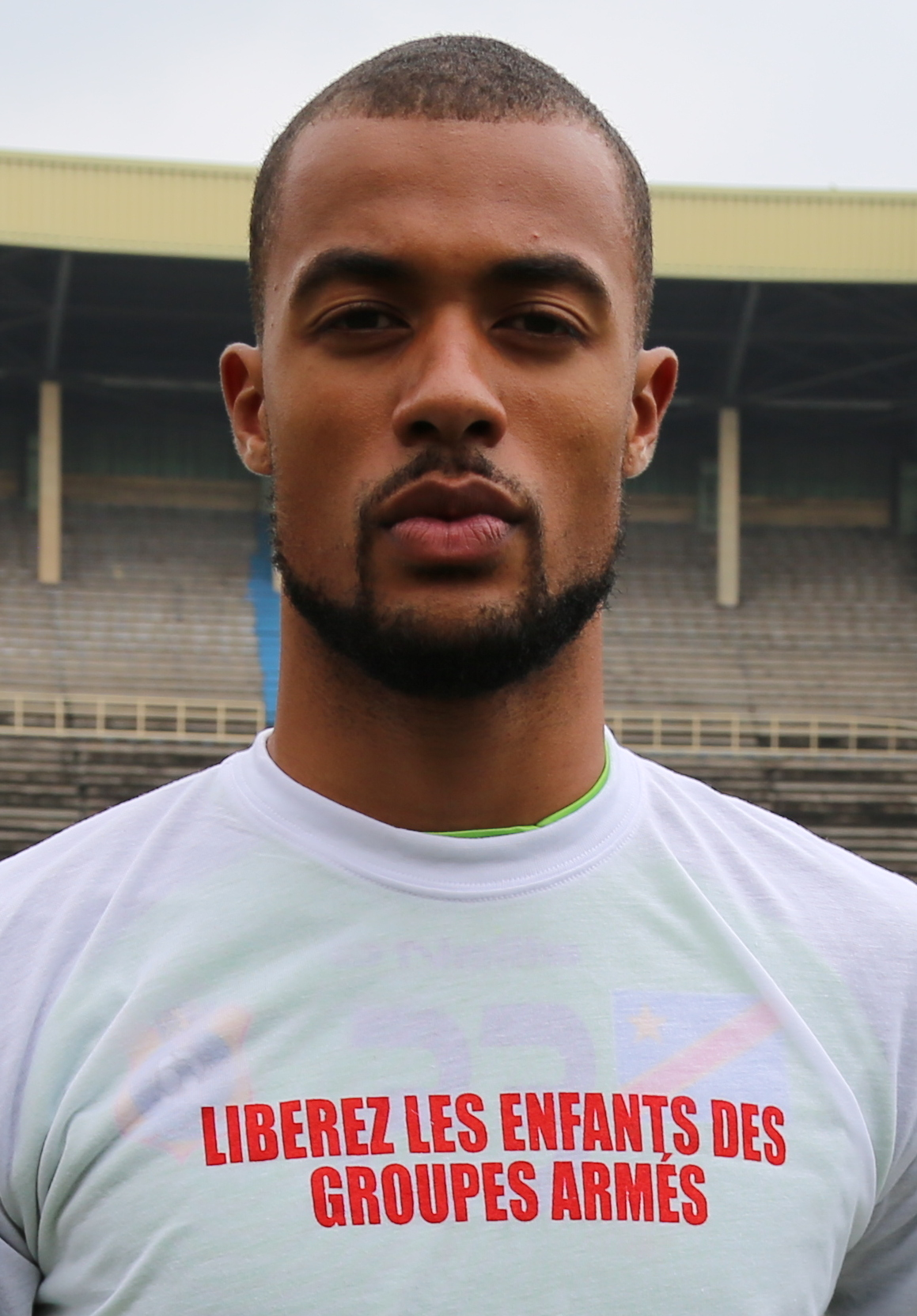
- Kiassumbua in 2016

Personal information
- Date of birth: 6 April 1992 (age 34)
- Place of birth: Luzern, Switzerland
- Height: 1.90 m (6 ft 3 in)
- Position: Goalkeeper

Team information
- Current team: YF Juventus
- Number: 44

Youth career
- Luzern

Senior career*
Years	Team	Apps	(Gls)
2010–2011	Luzern II	6	(0)
2011	→ Kriens (loan)	0	(0)
2011–2012	Rapperswil-Jona	5	(0)
2012	Wohlen II	3	(0)
2012–2017	Wohlen	98	(0)
2017–2018	Lugano	14	(0)
2018–2021	Servette	12	(0)
2022–2023	Bellinzona	25	(0)
2025	Stade Nyonnais	4	(0)
2025–	YF Juventus	33	(0)

International career^{‡}
2006–2007	Switzerland U15	3	(0)
2007–2008	Switzerland U16	5	(0)
2008–2009	Switzerland U17	4	(0)
2009–2010	Switzerland U18	2	(0)
2015–	DR Congo	23	(0)
- * Club domestic league appearances and goals as of 1 October 2026 ‡ National team caps and goals as of 3 July 2022

Joël Kiassumbua (born 6 April 1992) is a professional footballer who plays as a goalkeeper for Swiss club YF Juventus. Born in Switzerland, and a former Swiss youth international, he represents the DR Congo national team.

He was first called up to represent the DR Congo in a friendly game against Iraq in March 2015. In 2017, he was selected in DR Congo's final squad for the 2017 Africa Cup of Nations in Gabon.

== Club career ==
Kiassumbua began his playing career at FC Luzern. He rose through the youth ranks, eventually featuring for the reserve team during the 2010–11 season. During the second part of the 2010–11 season Kiassumbua would go on loan to third-tier side SC Kriens, however he did not feature for the club during his six months there. Upon returning to Luzern, he left the club, moving on to FC Rapperswil-Jona in August 2011. He made his debut on 28 August 2011 in a 4–4 away draw against FC Lugano II. His stay at the club was short though, remaining there for less than six months and making just five league appearances. In January 2012 he was released from Rapperswil-Jona.

Kiassumbua remained unattached until he signed for FC Wohlen in September 2012. He made his debut for Wohlen in the second half of the season on 6 April 2013 against FC Vaduz in a 2–1 away win. Prior to his first-team debut, Kiassumbua also featured twice for Wohlen's reserve team. He was the first keeper in the 2014–15 season.

In July 2017, Kiassumbua moved to Lugano. He made his league debut for Lugano on 18 November 2017 in a 2–0 away victory over St. Gallen. On 27 August 2018, Kiassumbua moved to Swiss Challenge League club Servette. He made his league debut for the club on 29 September 2018 in a 1–1 away draw with Rapperswil-Jona.

== International career ==
Kiassumbua was a Switzerland youth international, having competed at various youth levels. In 2009, he was part of the Swiss under-17 team that won the 2009 FIFA U-17 World Cup beating the host nation Nigeria 1–0 in the final. Although playing prior to the tournament, he remained an unused substitute at the tournament itself, unable to displace first choice Benjamin Siegrist who would go on to win the Golden Glove.

Kiassumbua decided in 2015 to play for the DR Congo national team. On 19 March 2015, he received his first call for the DR Congo team for the match against Iraq.

== Honours ==
- FIFA U-17 World Cup: 2009
