= Théo Valls =

French footballer (born 1995)

Personal information
- Date of birth: 18 December 1995 (age 30)
- Place of birth: Nîmes, France
- Height: 1.79 m (5 ft 10 in)
- Position: Midfielder

Team information
- Current team: Ibiza
- Number: 24

Youth career
- –2014: Nîmes

Senior career*
Years	Team	Apps	(Gls)
2013–2016	Nîmes II	36	(2)
2014–2020	Nîmes	146	(5)
2020–2023	Servette	91	(8)
2023–2026	Grenoble	72	(8)
2026–	Ibiza	19	(1)
- * Club domestic league appearances and goals as of 10 June 2026

Théo Valls (born 18 December 1995) is a French professional footballer who plays as a midfielder for Spanish Primera Federación club Ibiza.

== Career ==
Valls is a youth exponent from Nîmes Olympique. He made his Ligue 2 debut on 23 September 2014 against Châteauroux replacing Fethi Harek at half-time in a 1–0 home win.

In October 2023, Valls joined Ligue 2 club Grenoble on a contract until June 2026.

On 14 January 2026, Valls signed with Ibiza in the Spanish third tier.
