= Anthony Sauthier =

Swiss footballer (born 1991)

Personal information
- Date of birth: 5 February 1991 (age 35)
- Place of birth: Geneva, Switzerland
- Height: 1.84 m (6 ft 1/2 in)
- Position: Midfielder

Team information
- Current team: Yverdon
- Number: 32

Youth career
- Servette

Senior career*
Years	Team	Apps	(Gls)
2008	Servette	0	(0)
2009–2015	Sion II	31	(5)
2009–2015	Sion	69	(2)
2013–2015	→ Servette (loan)	52	(4)
2014	→ Servette II (loan)	5	(0)
2015–2022	Servette	183	(10)
2022	→ Yverdon (loan)	15	(0)
2022–	Yverdon	139	(4)

International career^{‡}
2008	Switzerland U17	1	(0)
2009	Switzerland U18	1	(0)
2010	Switzerland U19	5	(1)
2010–2011	Switzerland U20	6	(1)
- * Club domestic league appearances and goals as of 28 September 2026 ‡ National team caps and goals as of 29 March 2011

Anthony Sauthier (born 5 February 1991) is a Swiss professional footballer who plays as a midfielder for Yverdon.

== Club career ==
On 12 January 2022, Sauthier joined Yverdon on loan until the end of the season. On 12 July 2022, he returned to Yverdon on a permanent basis with a two-year contract.
