= Stefan Knezevic =

Swiss footballer (born 1996)

Personal information
- Date of birth: 30 October 1996 (age 30)
- Place of birth: Lucerne, Switzerland
- Height: 1.87 m (6 ft 2 in)
- Position: Centre-back

Team information
- Current team: Luzern
- Number: 5

Youth career
- 2003–2007: FC Hitzkirch
- 2004–2012: Luzern
- 2012–2013: Kriens
- 2013–2014: Luzern

Senior career*
| Years | Team | Apps | (Gls) |
| 2014–2021 | Luzern | 103 | (4) |
| 2014–2015 | → SC Buochs (loan) | 25 | (1) |
| 2021–2024 | Sporting Charleroi | 64 | (1) |
| 2024– | Luzern | 62 | (3) |

International career
| 2018 | Switzerland U20 | 2 | (0) |
- * Club domestic league appearances and goals as of 28 September 2026

Stefan Knezevic (Serbian: Стефан Кнежевић, Stefan Knežević; born 30 October 1996) is a Swiss professional footballer who plays as a centre-back for Luzern.

== Professional career ==
A youth product of Luzern, Knezevic was loaned to SC Buochs for the 2014–15 season to get first team training. He made his professional debut for Luzern in a 0-0 (6-5) Swiss Cup penalty shootout win over FC Sion on 4 April 2017. He made his Swiss Super League debut in a 2–0 win over FC Vaduz on 9 April 2017. He scored his first professional goal in a 4-1 Swiss Super League loss to Grasshopper Club Zürich on 22 April 2017.

On 11 June 2021, he signed a three-year contract with Sporting Charleroi in Belgium.

On 13 July 2024, Knezevic returned to Luzern on a five-year contract.

== Personal life ==
Knezevic was born in Switzerland, and is of Serbian descent.

== Honours ==
Luzern

- Swiss Cup: 2020–21
