= Lucas Monteiro =

Swiss footballer (born 2001)

Personal information
- Full name: Lucas Monteiro Fernandes
- Date of birth: 25 May 2001 (age 25)
- Place of birth: Meyrin, Switzerland
- Height: 1.78 m (5 ft 10 in)
- Position: Right back

Team information
- Current team: Chênois
- Number: 2

Youth career
- 2008–2009: Interstar
- 2009–2020: Servette

Senior career*
Years	Team	Apps	(Gls)
2018–2019	Servette U21	13	(1)
2020–2022	Servette	2	(0)
2020–2021	→ Étoile Carouge (loan)	20	(0)
2021–2022	→ Stade Nyonnais (loan)	10	(0)
2022–	Chênois	8	(1)
- * Club domestic league appearances and goals as of 23 September 2021

Lucas Monteiro Fernandes (born 25 May 2001) is a Swiss footballer who plays as a right back for Chênois.

== Playing career ==
On 7 July 2020, Monteiro signed his first professional contract with Servette. Monteiro made his professional debut with Servette in a 2–2 Swiss Super League tie with Basel on 19 July 2020.
