= Noah Henchoz =

Swiss footballer (born 2002)

Personal information
- Date of birth: 22 February 2002 (age 24)
- Place of birth: Chêne-Bougeries, Switzerland
- Height: 1.82 m (6 ft 0 in)
- Position: Defender

Team information
- Current team: Étoile Carouge
- Number: 28

Youth career
- –2018: Étoile Carouge
- 2018–2020: Servette

Senior career*
Years	Team	Apps	(Gls)
2019–2024	Servette U21	35	(0)
2020–2024	Servette	2	(0)
2022–2023	→ Étoile Carouge (loan)	29	(0)
2024	→ Étoile Carouge (loan)	2	(0)
2024–	Étoile Carouge	17	(0)

International career^{‡}
2017	Switzerland U15	2	(0)
2017	Switzerland U16	2	(0)
2019	Switzerland U18	1	(0)
- * Club domestic league appearances and goals as of 1 July 2025 ‡ National team caps and goals as of 16:00, 23 July 2020 (UTC)

Noah Henchoz (born 22 February 2002) is a Swiss professional footballer who plays as a defender for Étoile Carouge.

== Career statistics ==
=== Club ===
As of 23 July 2020.

Club	Season	League			Cup		Continental		Other		Total	
Club	Season	Division	Apps	Goals	Apps	Goals	Apps	Goals	Apps	Goals	Apps	Goals
Servette U21	2019–20	2. Liga Interregional	13	0	–		–		0	0	13	0
Servette	2019–20	Swiss Super League	1	0	0	0	–		0	0	1	0
Career total			14	0	0	0	0	0	0	0	14	0
