= Moussa Diallo (footballer, born 1997) =

French footballer (born 1997)

Personal information
- Date of birth: 27 January 1997 (age 29)
- Place of birth: Corbeil-Essonnes, Paris, France
- Height: 1.78 m (5 ft 10 in)
- Position: Right-back

Team information
- Current team: Nîmes
- Number: 29

Youth career
- 2006–2008: Evry Essonne A.S.
- 2008–2010: Brétigny Foot C.S.
- 2010–2016: Auxerre

Senior career*
Years	Team	Apps	(Gls)
2014–2018	Auxerre B	50	(5)
2016–2018	Auxerre	15	(0)
2019–2020	Cholet	37	(0)
2020–2025	Servette	64	(0)
2023	Servette U21	3	(0)
2024	→ Beroe Stara Zagora (loan)	3	(0)
2025–	Nîmes	10	(0)
- * Club domestic league appearances and goals as of 24 January 2026

Moussa Diallo (born 27 January 1997) is a French professional footballer who plays for Championnat National 1 club Nîmes as a right-back.

== Club career ==
Diallo came through the youth system at Auxerre, making his professional debut on 30 July 2016 as a substitute against Red Star. He joined Cholet in January 2019.

On 29 January 2024, Diallo joined Beroe Stara Zagora in Bulgaria on loan.

== International career ==
Diallo was born in France and is of Mauritanian descent. He was called up to the senior Mauritania national team for a pair of friendlies in August 2017, but withdrew without making an appearance for the team.

== Career statistics ==
As of 15 April 2017

Appearances and goals by club, season and competition
Club	Season	League			National cup (Note: Includes Coupe de France.)		League cup (Note: Includes Coupe de la Ligue.)		Total	
Club	Season	Division	Apps	Goals	Apps	Goals	Apps	Goals	Apps	Goals
Auxerre B	2014–15	CFA 2	12	1	–		–		12	1
Auxerre B	2015–16	CFA	10	1	–		–		10	1
Auxerre B	2016–17	CFA	16	0	–		–		16	0
Auxerre B	2017–18	Championnat National 3	12	3	–		–		12	3
Auxerre B	Total		50	5	0	0	0	0	50	5
Auxerre	2016–17	Ligue 2	11	0	1	0	3	0	15	0
Auxerre	2017–18	Ligue 2	4	0	1	0	1	0	6	0
Auxerre	Total		15	0	2	0	4	0	21	0
Career total			65	5	2	0	4	0	71	0
