= Boubacar Fofana (footballer, born 1998) =

French footballer (born 1998)

Personal information
- Date of birth: 7 September 1998 (age 28)
- Place of birth: Paris, France
- Height: 1.82 m (6 ft 0 in)
- Position: Winger

Team information
- Current team: Sochaux
- Number: 10

Youth career
- 2004–2011: Champs-sur-Marne
- 2011–2014: Torcy
- 2014–2016: Bastia
- 2016–2017: Torcy

Senior career*
Years	Team	Apps	(Gls)
2017–2018	Épinal	20	(1)
2018–2019	Saint-Priest	14	(5)
2019–2020	Lyon	0	(0)
2019	→ Gazélec Ajaccio (loan)	2	(0)
2019–2020	Lyon II	12	(2)
2020–2024	Servette	47	(9)
2023–2024	Servette U21	6	(6)
2024–2025	Winterthur	32	(3)
2025–	Sochaux	19	(2)
- * Club domestic league appearances and goals as of 23 June 2026

Boubacar Fofana (born 7 September 1998) is a French professional footballer who plays as a winger for Sochaux.

== Career ==
Fofana began playing football locally with Champs-sur-Marne, and moved to Bastia and Torcy before beginning his senior career with Épinal in 2017. On 14 January 2019, Fofana joined Lyon on a four-year contract and immediately went on loan to Gazélec Ajaccio.

Fofana made his professional debut for Gazélec Ajaccio in a 1–1 Ligue 2 tie with Chamois Niortais on 23 April 2019.

On 7 January 2024, Fofana signed a 2.5-year contract with Winterthur.

== Personal life ==
Fofana holds French and Malian nationalities.
