= 2023–24 Servette FC season =

Servette FC
2023–24 season
- Manager: Raphaël Wicky
- Stadium: Stade de Genève
- Swiss Super League: 3rd
- Swiss Cup: Winners
- UEFA Champions League: Play-off round
- UEFA Europa League: Group stage
- UEFA Europa Conference League: Round of 16
- Top goalscorer: League: Chris Bedia (10); All: Chris Bedia (16)
Home colours	Away colours	Third colours

The 2023–24 season was Servette FC's 126th season in existence and 23rd consecutive in the Swiss Super League. They also competed in the Swiss Cup, the UEFA Champions League, the UEFA Europa League and the UEFA Europa Conference League.

== Players ==
=== First-team squad ===
As of 22 February 2024

Note: Flags indicate national team as defined under FIFA eligibility rules; some limited exceptions apply. Players may hold more than one non-FIFA nationality.

No.	Pos.	Nation	Player
1	GK	CYP	Joël Mall
2	DF	FRA	Moussa Diallo
3	DF	JPN	Keigo Tsunemoto
4	DF	SUI	Steve Rouiller
5	MF	CMR	Gaël Ondoua
6	DF	GLP	Anthony Baron
8	MF	FRA	Timothé Cognat
9	MF	BIH	Miroslav Stevanović
10	MF	SUI	Alexis Antunes
11	FW	FRA	Boubacar Fofana
12	DF	SUI	Issa Kaloga
17	MF	SUI	Dereck Kutesa
18	DF	CGO	Bradley Mazikou
19	DF	FRA	Yoan Severin
20	DF	SUI	Théo Magnin

No.	Pos.	Nation	Player
21	FW	SUI	Jérémy Guillemenot
22	MF	DEN	Alexander Lyng
26	DF	SUI	Noah Henchoz
27	FW	FRA	Enzo Crivelli
28	MF	FRA	David Douline
29	FW	CIV	Chris Bedia
30	MF	SEN	Samba Lélé Diba
31	FW	SUI	Tiemoko Ouattara
32	GK	SUI	Jérémy Frick
33	DF	SUI	Nicolas Vouilloz
44	GK	KOS	Léo Besson
45	MF	FRA	Hussayn Touati
68	DF	CMR	Jérôme Onguéné (on loan from Eintracht Frankfurt)
77	DF	HUN	Bendegúz Bolla (on loan from Wolverhampton Wanderers)
—	DF	SUI	Baba Souare

=== Out on loan ===
Note: Flags indicate national team as defined under FIFA eligibility rules; some limited exceptions apply. Players may hold more than one non-FIFA nationality.

No.	Pos.	Nation	Player
23	FW	FRA	Ronny Rodelin (at Perly-Certoux until 30 June 2024)
—	GK	SUI	Edin Omeragić (at Stade Nyonnais until 30 June 2024)
—	DF	KOS	Valton Behrami (at Bellinzona until 1 January 2024)

No.	Pos.	Nation	Player
—	DF	SUI	Malik Sawadogo (at Stade Nyonnais until 30 June 2024)
—	MF	CIV	Sidiki Camara (at Stade Nyonnais until 30 June 2024)

== Pre-season and friendlies ==
Win Draw Loss Fixtures

28 June 2023 Friendly	Servette FC (Switzerland)	4–0	(Switzerland) Neuchâtel Xamax
17:30 CEST (UTC+2)

30 June 2023 Friendly	Servette FC (Switzerland)	1–0	(Switzerland) Stade Nyonnais
19:00 CEST (UTC+2)

7 July 2023 Friendly	Servette (Switzerland)	2–0	(Belgium) Cercle Brugge
18:00 CEST (UTC+2)

11 July 2023 Friendly	Servette FC (Switzerland)	5–2	(Switzerland) FC Rapperswil-Jona
17:30 CEST (UTC+2)

== Competitions ==
=== Overall record ===
Competition	First match	Last match	Starting round	Final position	Record							
Competition	First match	Last match	Starting round	Final position	Pld	W	D	L	GF	GA	GD	Win %
Swiss Super League	22 July 2023	May 2024	Matchday 1		17	8	6	3	28	20	+8	47.06
Swiss Cup	19 August 2023		Round 1		3	2	1	0	13	2	+11	66.67
UEFA Champions League	25 July 2023	15 August 2023	Third qualifying round	Play-off round	4	0	3	1	5	6	−1	0.00
UEFA Europa League	21 September 2023	14 December 2023	Group stage	Group stage	6	1	2	3	4	13	−9	16.67
UEFA Europa Conference League	15 February 2024		Knockout round play-offs		0	0	0	0	0	0	+0	—
Total					30	11	12	7	50	41	+9	36.67

Last updated: 13 December 2023
Source: Soccerway

=== Swiss Super League ===
==== League table ====
Pos	Team	Pld	W	D	L	GF	GA	GD	Pts	Qualification or relegation (Note: Teams played each other three times (33 matches), before the league was split into two groups (the top six and the bottom six).)
1	Young Boys (C)	38	23	8	7	76	34	+42	77	Qualification for the Champions League play-off round
2	Lugano	38	20	5	13	67	51	+16	65	Qualification for the Champions League second qualifying round
3	Servette	38	18	10	10	59	43	+16	64	Qualification for the Europa League third qualifying round (Note: Servette qualified for the Europa League third qualifying round as the 2023–24 Swiss Cup winners.)
4	Zürich	38	16	12	10	53	41	+12	60	Qualification for the Conference League second qualifying round
5	St. Gallen	38	16	9	13	60	51	+9	57	Qualification for the Conference League second qualifying round

Source: Swiss Super League
Rules for classification: 1) Points; 2) Goal difference; 3) Goals scored; 4) Head-to-head goal difference; 5) Head-to-head goals scored 6) Away goals scored; 7) Draw.
(C) Champions

==== Results summary ====
Overall								Home						Away					
Pld	W	D	L	GF	GA	GD	Pts	W	D	L	GF	GA	GD	W	D	L	GF	GA	GD
17	8	6	3	28	20	+8	30	4	3	1	17	10	+7	4	3	2	11	10	+1

Last updated: 14 December 2023.

==== Results by round ====
Round	1	2	3	4	5	6	7	8	9	10	11	12	13	14	15	16	17	18
Ground	A	H	A	H	A	H	A	H	H	A	A	H	A	H	H	A	A	H
Result	W	D	D	D	L	L	L	D	W	W	W	W	W	W	W	D	D	
Position	2	2	5	5	9	9	9	9	8	7	5	4	4	4	3	4	4	

Updated to match(es) played on November 2023. Source:
A = Away; H = Home; W = Win; D = Draw; L = Loss; P = Postponed

==== Matches ====
22 July 2023 1	Grasshoppers	1–3	Servette	Zürich
18:00 CEST (UTC+2)	Ndenge 23'		Bedia 16', 61'; Crivelli 77' (pen.)	Stadium: Letzigrund; Attendance: 4,371; Referee: Luca Cibelli

29 July 2023 2	Servette	2–2	Zürich	Lancy
20:30 CEST (UTC+2)	Bedia 66' (pen.); Kutesa 86'		Rohner 11'; Mathew 57'	Stadium: Stade de Genève; Attendance: 7,103; Referee: Fedayi San

5 August 2023 3	Stade Lausanne-Ouchy	1–1	Servette	Lausanne
18:00 CEST (UTC+2)	Ajdini 68' (pen.)		Pflücke 90+6'	Stadium: Stade Olympique de la Pontaise; Attendance: 3,257; Referee: Johannes von Mandach

12 August 2023 4	Servette	1–1	St. Gallen	Lancy
20:30 CEST (UTC+2)	Bedia 6'		Vallci 81'	Stadium: Stade de Genève; Attendance: 6,541; Referee: Lionel Tschudi

26 August 2023 5	Yverdon-Sport	4–1	Servette	Neuchâtel
18:00 CEST (UTC+2)	Lungoyi 2', 56'; Mahious 54'; Klepač 90+6'		Rodelin 87'	Stadium: Stade de la Maladière; Attendance: 0 Referee: Lionel Tschudi

3 September 2023 6	Servette	0–1	Young Boys	Lancy
14:15 CEST (UTC+2)			Łakomy 2'	Stadium: Stade de Genève; Attendance: 10,593; Referee: Alessandro Dudic

24 September 2023 7	Luzern	2–0	Servette	Lucerne
16:30 CEST (UTC+2)	Bolla 7' (o.g.); Meyer 18'			Stadium: Swissporarena; Attendance: 13,256; Referee: Urs Schnyder

27 September 2023 8	Servette	2–2	Winterthur	Lancy
20:30 CEST (UTC+2)	Bedia 54'; Stevanović 82'		Buess 45+2' (pen.); Severin 89' (o.g.)	Stadium: Stade de Genève; Attendance: 4,124; Referee: Sven Wolfensberger

30 September 2023 9	Servette	2–1	Lausanne-Sport	Lancy
18:00 CEST (UTC+2)	Stevanović 54'; Kutesa 56'		Sanches 39'	Stadium: Stade de Genève; Attendance: 9,023; Referee: Esther Staubli

8 October 2023 10	Lugano	0–1	Servette	Lugano
14:15 CEST (UTC+2)			Crivelli 39'	Stadium: Cornaredo Stadium; Attendance: 3,523; Referee: Sandro Schärer

21 October 2023 11	Basel	0–1	Servette	Basel
20:30 CEST (UTC+2)			Severin 63'	Stadium: St. Jakob-Park; Attendance: 20,194; Referee: Lukas Fähndrich

29 October 2023 12	Servette	4–2	Luzern	Lancy
15:30 CET (UTC+1)	Antunes 7'; Bedia 66'; Bolla 82'; Crivelli 90+6' (pen.)		Ottiger 33'; Chader 61'	Stadium: Stade de Genève; Attendance: 7,236; Referee: Alessandro Dudic

4 November 2023 13	Zürich	0–2	Servette	Zürich
19:30 CET (UTC+1)			Bedia 4'; Rouiller 62'	Stadium: Letzigrund; Attendance: 12,910; Referee: Sven Wolfensberger

12 November 2023 14	Servette	4–1	Basel	Lancy
15:30 CET (UTC+1)	Guillemenot 45', 90+3'; Crivelli 66'; Cognat 82'		Xhaka 21'	Stadium: Stade de Genève; Attendance: 7,273; Referee: Sandro Schärer

26 November 2023 15	Servette	2–0	Grasshopper	Lancy
15:30 CET (UTC+1)	Guillemenot 16'; Cognat 75'			Stadium: Stade de Genève; Attendance: 7,124; Referee: Stefan Horisberger

3 December 2023 16	Young Boys	1–1	Servette	Bern
15:30 CET (UTC+1)	Ganvoula 58'		Bedia 8'	Stadium: Stadion Wankdorf; Attendance: 31,500; Referee: Lionel Tschudi

9 December 2023 17	Lausanne-Sport	1–1	Servette	Lausanne
19:30 CET (UTC+1)	Kalu 72'		Bolla 3'	Stadium: Stade de la Tuilière; Attendance: 9,237; Referee: Lionel Tschudi

17 December 2023 18	Servette	2–2	Lugano	Lancy
15:30 CET (UTC+1)				Stadium: Stade de Genève; Attendance: 2,873; Referee: Luca Cibelli

=== Swiss Cup ===
19 August 2023 First round	Meyrin	0–8	Servette	Meyrin
18:00 CEST (UTC+2)			Crivelli 18'; Fofana 40' (pen.); Touati 64', 82', 84', 89'; Cognat 85'; Guillemenot 90+2'	Stadium: Stade des Arbères; Referee: Michèle Schmölzer

16 September 2023 Second round	Bulle	1–4	Servette	Bulle
19:00 CEST (UTC+2)	Lahiouel 66'		Kutesa 14'; Bedia 38' (pen.); Mazikou 57'; Crivelli 77' (pen.)	Stadium: Stade de Bouleyres; Attendance: 1,356; Referee: Johannes von Mandach

1 November 2023 Round of 16	Servette	1–1 (a.e.t.) (4–1 p)	Lausanne Ouchy	Lancy
18:30 CET (UTC+1)	Kutesa 73'		Qarri 84'	Stadium: Stade de Genève; Attendance: 3,250; Referee: Luca Cibelli
	Penalties
	Stevanović (penalty scored); Bedia (penalty scored); Tsunemoto (penalty scored); Severin (penalty scored)		(penalty missed) Mulaj; (penalty scored) Ajdini; (penalty missed) Qarri

27 February 2024 Quarter-finals	Delémont	0–2	Servette	Delémont
16:00 CET (UTC+1)				Stadium: La Blancherie

=== UEFA Champions League ===
==== Second qualifying round ====
The draw for the third qualifying round was held on 21 June 2023.

25 July 2023 First leg	Servette (Switzerland)	1–1	(Belgium) Genk	Geneva
20:30	Rouiller 77'	Report	Arokodare 21'	Stadium: Stade de Genève; Attendance: 18,026; Referee: István Vad (Hungary)

2 August 2023 Second leg	Genk (Belgium)	2–2 (a.e.t.) (3–3 agg.) (1–4 p)	(Switzerland) Servette	Genk, Belgium
19:00	Trésor 28' (pen.); Arokodare 52'	Report	Cognat 36'; Bedia 63'	Stadium: Cegeka Arena; Attendance: 16,280; Referee: Novak Simović (Serbia)
	Penalties
	Hrošovský (penalty missed); Cuesta (penalty scored); Arokodare (penalty missed)		(penalty scored) Touati; (penalty scored) Guillemenot; (penalty scored) Severin; (penalty scored) Rodelin

==== Third qualifying round ====
The draw for the third qualifying round was held on 24 July 2023.

9 August 2023 First leg	Rangers (Scotland)	2–1	(Switzerland) Servette	Glasgow, Scotland
19:45	Tavernier 6' (pen.); Dessers 15'	Report	Bedia 44' (pen.)	Stadium: Ibrox Stadium; Attendance: 48,956; Referee: Donatas Rumšas (Lithuania)

15 August 2023 Second leg	Servette (Switzerland)	1–1 (2–3 agg.)	(Scotland) Rangers	Lancy
20:30	Kutesa 22'	Report	Tavernier 50'	Stadium: Stade de Genève; Attendance: 26,000; Referee: Maurizio Mariani (Italy)

=== UEFA Europa League ===
==== Group stage ====
The draw for the group stage was held on 1 September 2023.

Pos	Team	Pld	W	D	L	GF	GA	GD	Pts	Qualification	SLP	ROM	SRV	SHE
1	(Czech Republic) Slavia Prague	6	5	0	1	17	4	+13	15	Advance to round of 16	—	2–0	4–0	6–0
2	(Italy) Roma	6	4	1	1	12	4	+8	13	Advance to knockout round play-offs	2–0	—	4–0	3–0
3	(Switzerland) Servette	6	1	2	3	4	13	−9	5	Transfer to Europa Conference League	0–2	1–1	—	2–1
4	(Moldova) Sheriff Tiraspol	6	0	1	5	5	17	−12	1		2–3	1–2	1–1	—

Source: UEFA
Rules for classification: Group stage tiebreakers

21 September 2023 1	Servette (Switzerland)	0–2	(Czech Republic) Slavia Prague	Lancy
18:45		Report	Masopust 32'; Ogbu 59'	Stadium: Stade de Genève; Attendance: 19,783; Referee: Giorgi Kruashvili (Georgia)

5 October 2023 2	Roma (Italy)	4–0	(Switzerland) Servette	Rome, Italy
21:00	Lukaku 21'; Belotti 46', 59'; Pellegrini 52'	Report		Stadium: Stadio Olimpico; Attendance: 55,764; Referee: Igor Pajač (Croatia)

26 October 2023 3	Sheriff Tiraspol (Moldova)	1–1	(Switzerland) Servette	Tiraspol, Moldova
21:00 (22:00 EEST)	Ankeye 80'	Report	Crivelli 41'	Stadium: Sheriff Arena; Attendance: 2,834; Referee: John Brooks (England)

9 November 2023 4	Servette (Switzerland)	2–1	(Moldova) Sheriff Tiraspol	Lancy
18:45	Rouiller 84'; Bedia 90+3' (pen.)	Report	Severin 12' (o.g.)	Stadium: Stade de Genève; Attendance: 15,822; Referee: Manfredas Lukjančukas (Lithuania)

30 November 2023 5	Servette (Switzerland)	1–1	(Italy) Roma	Lancy
21:00	Bedia 50'	Report	Lukaku 21'	Stadium: Stade de Genève; Attendance: 28,534; Referee: Daniel Stefański (Poland)

14 December 2023 6	Slavia Prague (Czech Republic)	4–0	(Switzerland) Servette	Prague, Czech Republic
18:45	Douděra 15'; Schranz 25'; Chytil 30', 45+1'	Report		Stadium: Fortuna Arena; Attendance: 18,380; Referee: Nick Walsh (Scotland)

=== UEFA Europa Conference League ===
==== Knockout phase ====
===== Knockout round play-offs =====
The draw for the knockout round play-offs will be held on 18 December 2023.

15 February 2024 First leg	Servette (Switzerland)	0–0	(Bulgaria) Ludogorets Razgrad	Stade de Genève, Geneva
21:00		Report		Attendance: 13,847; Referee: Filip Glova (Slovakia)

22 February 2024 Second leg	Ludogorets Razgrad (Bulgaria)	0–1 (0–1 agg.)	(Switzerland) Servette	Huvepharma Arena, Razgrad
18:45 (19:45 EET)		Report	Cognat 6'	Attendance: 6,487; Referee: Aliyar Aghayev (Azerbaijan)

==== Round of 16 ====
7 March 2024 First leg	Servette (Switzerland)	0–0	(Czech Republic) Viktoria Plzeň	Stade de Genève, Geneva
21:00		Report		Attendance: 15,354; Referee: Morten Krogh (Denmark)

14 March 2024 Second leg	Viktoria Plzeň (Czech Republic)	0–0 (a.e.t.) (3–1 p)	(Switzerland) Servette	Doosan Arena, Plzeň
18:45		Report		Attendance: 11,225; Referee: Willie Collum (Scotland)
	Penalties
	Chorý (penalty scored); Mosquera (penalty scored); Šulc (penalty scored)		(penalty missed) Stevanović; (penalty scored) Gullemenot; (penalty missed) Severin; (penalty missed) Tsunemoto
