= 2022–23 Servette FC season =

Servette FC
2022–23 season
- Owner: 1890 Foundation
- Chairman: Didier Fischer
- Manager: Alain Geiger
- Stadium: Stade de Genève
- Swiss Super League: 2nd
- Swiss Cup: Semi-finals
| Home colours | Away colours | Third colours |

The 2022–23 Servette FC season was the club's 133rd season in existence and the fourth consecutive season in the top flight of Swiss football. In addition to the domestic league, Servette participated in this season's edition of the Swiss Cup. The season covered the period from 1 July 2022 to 30 June 2023.

== Players ==
=== First-team squad ===
Note: Flags indicate national team as defined under FIFA eligibility rules; some limited exceptions apply. Players may hold more than one non-FIFA nationality.

| No. | Pos. | Nation | Player |
|---|---|---|---|
| 1 | GK | SUI | Steven Deana |
| 2 | DF | FRA | Moussa Diallo |
| 3 | DF | FRA | Gaël Clichy |
| 4 | DF | SUI | Steve Rouiller |
| 5 | MF | BOL | Boris Céspedes |
| 7 | FW | GER | Patrick Pflücke |
| 8 | MF | FRA | Timothé Cognat |
| 9 | MF | BIH | Miroslav Stevanović |
| 10 | MF | SUI | Alexis Antunes |
| 11 | MF | FRA | Boubacar Fofana |
| 15 | MF | FRA | Theo Valls |
| 17 | MF | ANG | Dereck Kutesa |
| 19 | DF | FRA | Yoan Severin |
| 20 | DF | SUI | Théo Magnin |

| No. | Pos. | Nation | Player |
|---|---|---|---|
| 21 | DF | SUI | Baba Souare |
| 22 | DF | SUI | Valton Behrami |
| 23 | FW | FRA | Ronny Rodelin |
| 24 | DF | SUI | Malik Sawadogo |
| 25 | MF | SUI | Sidiki Camara |
| 26 | DF | AUT | Moritz Bauer |
| 27 | FW | FRA | Enzo Crivelli |
| 28 | MF | FRA | David Douline |
| 29 | FW | CIV | Chris Bedia |
| 30 | MF | SEN | Samba Diba |
| 32 | GK | SUI | Jérémy Frick |
| 33 | DF | SUI | Nicolas Vouilloz |
| 34 | DF | FRA | Anthony Baron |
| 40 | GK | SUI | Edin Omeragic |
| 43 | DF | SUI | Kevin Mbabu |

=== Out on loan ===
Note: Flags indicate national team as defined under FIFA eligibility rules; some limited exceptions apply. Players may hold more than one non-FIFA nationality.

| No. | Pos. | Nation | Player |
|---|---|---|---|
| — | FW | SUI | Dimitri Oberlin (at Thun) |
| — | DF | SUI | Mathis Magnin (at Étoile Carouge) |
| — | DF | SUI | Lucas Monteiro (at Nyonnais) |

| No. | Pos. | Nation | Player |
|---|---|---|---|
| — | DF | SUI | Anthony Sauthier (at Yverdon-Sport) |
| — | FW | SUI | Matteo Regillo (at Étoile Carouge) |
| — | FW | SUI | Alexandre Dias Particio (at Hellas Verona) |

== Transfers ==
=== In ===
| No. | Pos | Player | Transferred from | Fee | Date | Source |
|---|---|---|---|---|---|---|
| 43 | DF | (Switzerland) Kevin Mbabu | Fulham F.C. | Loan | 13 February 2023 | |

=== Out ===
| No. | Pos | Player | Transferred to | Fee | Date | Source |
|---|---|---|---|---|---|---|
| 41 | FW | (Switzerland) Alexandre Dias Patricio | Hellas Verona | Loan | 31 January 2023 | |

== Pre-season and friendlies ==
Win Draw Loss Fixtures

| 25 June 2022 Friendly | Sion (Switzerland) | 1–2 | (Switzerland) Servette | Lens |
| 16:00 CET (UTC+1) | | Report | | Stadium: Stade du Christ-Roi |

| 29 June 2022 Friendly | Stade Lausanne Ouchy (Switzerland) | 1–2 | (Switzerland) Servette | Lausanne |
| 17:30 CET (UTC+1) | | Report | | Stadium: Stade Juan-Antonio Samaranch |

| 2 July 2022 Friendly | Servette (Switzerland) | 5–1 | (Switzerland) Neuchâtel Xamax | Payerne |
| 17:30 CET (UTC+1) | | Report | | Stadium: Stade Municipal |

| 5 July 2022 Friendly | Servette (Switzerland) | 0–1 | (France) Annecy | Nyon |
| 17:00 CET (UTC+1) | | Report | | Stadium: Centre sportif de Colovray |

| 8 July 2022 Friendly | Servette (Switzerland) | 0–2 | (England) West Ham United | Lancy |
| 18:00 CET (UTC+1) | | Report | | Stadium: Stade de Genève |

| 14 December 2022 Friendly | Servette (Switzerland) | 0–3 | (Italy) Spezia | Oliva, Spain |
| 15:00 CET (UTC+1) | | Report | | Stadium: Oliva Nova Golf & Beach Resort Campo 2 |

| 17 December 2022 Friendly | Servette (Switzerland) | 1–0 | (Netherlands) Utrecht | Dehesa de Campoamor, Spain |
| 14:00 CET (UTC+1) | | Report | | Stadium: Real Club de Golf Campoamor Campo 1 |

| 21 December 2022 Friendly | Servette (Switzerland) | 4–2 | (France) Annecy | Divonne-les-Bains, France |
| 14:30 CET (UTC+1) | | Report | | Stadium: Stade de la Fontenette |

== Competitions ==
=== Overview ===
| Competition | First match | Last match | Starting round | Record | | | | | | | |
| Competition | First match | Last match | Starting round | Pld | W | D | L | GF | GA | GD | Win % |
|---|---|---|---|---|---|---|---|---|---|---|---|
| Swiss Super League | August 2022 | May 2023 | Matchday 1 | 36 | 14 | 16 | 6 | 53 | 48 | +5 | 38.89 |
| Swiss Cup | 19 August 2022 | 5 April 2023 | Round 1 | 5 | 4 | 0 | 1 | 11 | 3 | +8 | 80.00 |
| Total | | | | 41 | 18 | 16 | 7 | 64 | 51 | +13 | 43.90 |

Last updated: 19 February 2023
Source: Competitions

=== Swiss Super League ===
==== League table ====
| Pos | Team | Pld | W | D | L | GF | GA | GD | Pts | Qualification or relegation |
|---|---|---|---|---|---|---|---|---|---|---|
| 1 | Young Boys (C) | 36 | 21 | 11 | 4 | 82 | 30 | +52 | 74 | Qualification for the Champions League play-off round |
| 2 | Servette | 36 | 14 | 16 | 6 | 53 | 48 | +5 | 58 | Qualification for the Champions League second qualifying round |
| 3 | Lugano | 36 | 15 | 12 | 9 | 59 | 47 | +12 | 57 | Qualification for the Europa League play-off round |
| 4 | Luzern | 36 | 13 | 11 | 12 | 56 | 52 | +4 | 50 | Qualification for the Europa Conference League second qualifying round |
| 5 | Basel | 36 | 11 | 14 | 11 | 51 | 50 | +1 | 47 | Qualification for the Europa Conference League second qualifying round |

Source: Swiss Super League
Rules for classification: 1) Points; 2) Goal difference; 3) Goals scored; 4) Head-to-head goal difference; 5) Away goals scored; 6) Draw.
(C) Champions

==== Results summary ====
| Overall | | | | | | | | Home | | | | | | Away | | | | | |
| Pld | W | D | L | GF | GA | GD | Pts | W | D | L | GF | GA | GD | W | D | L | GF | GA | GD |
|---|---|---|---|---|---|---|---|---|---|---|---|---|---|---|---|---|---|---|---|
| 21 | 8 | 9 | 4 | 27 | 27 | 0 | 33 | 5 | 5 | 0 | 15 | 9 | +6 | 3 | 4 | 4 | 12 | 18 | −6 |

Last updated: 19 February 2023.

==== Results by round ====
| Round | 1 | 2 | 3 | 4 | 5 | 6 | 7 | 8 | 9 | 10 | 11 | 12 | 13 | 14 | 15 | 16 | 17 | 18 | 19 | 20 | 21 | 22 |
|---|---|---|---|---|---|---|---|---|---|---|---|---|---|---|---|---|---|---|---|---|---|---|
| Ground | H | A | A | H | A | H | A | H | A | H | H | A | A | H | H | A | A | H | A | H | A | H |
| Result | W | D | D | W | L | W | W | W | L | D | D | W | D | D | D | L | W | D | L | W | D | |
| Position | 3 | 3 | 5 | 3 | 5 | 3 | 3 | 2 | 2 | 2 | 2 | 2 | 2 | 2 | 2 | 2 | 2 | 2 | 2 | 2 | 2 | |

Updated to match(es) played on 19 February 2023. Source:
A = Away; H = Home; W = Win; D = Draw; L = Loss

==== Matches ====
===== First half of season =====
| 17 July 2022 1 | Servette | 1–0 | St. Gallen | Lancy |
| 16:30 CET | Rodelin 5'; Antunes (yellow card) 46' | Report | Maglica (yellow card) 15'; Schubert (yellow card) 58' | Stadium: Stade de Genève; Attendance: 4,872; Referee: (Switzerland) Lukas Fähndrich |

| 24 July 2022 2 | Basel | 1–1 | Servette | Basel |
| 14:15 CET | Ndoye 45+1' (yellow card) 90+1'; Frei (yellow card) 47'; Nuhu (yellow card) 84' | Report | Vouilloz (yellow card) 28'; Clichy (yellow card) 32'; Bedia (yellow card) 35'; Douline (yellow card) 75'; Valls 87'; Severin (yellow card) 90+1' | Stadium: St. Jakob-Park; Attendance: 18,670; Referee: (Switzerland) Alessandro Dudic |

| 30 July 2022 3 | Sion | 0–0 | Servette | Sion |
| 20:30 CET | Lavanchy (yellow card) 31'; Batata (yellow card) 36'; Saintini (yellow card) 86'; Lindner (yellow card) 90+3' | Report | Rouiller (yellow card) 77'; Oberlin (yellow card) 90+7' | Stadium: Stade Tourbillon; Attendance: 8,200; Referee: (Switzerland) Sven Wolfensberger |

| 6 August 2022 4 | Servette | 1–0 | Winterthur | Lancy |
| 18:00 CET | Cognat (yellow card) 8'; Pflücke 81' (pen.); Frick (yellow card) 86' | Report | Buess (yellow card) 11'; Rodríguez (yellow card) 38'; Gelmi (yellow card) 75'; Lekaj (yellow card) 80'; Ramizi (yellow card) 82'; Kamberi (yellow card) 85' | Stadium: Stade de Genève; Attendance: 4,624; Referee: (Switzerland) Stefan Horisberger |

| 14 August 2022 5 | Young Boys | 3–0 | Servette | Bern |
| 16:30 CET | Zesiger (yellow card) 6'; Rieder 29'; Ngamaleu (yellow card) 48'; Elia 60'; Blum (yellow card) 63'; Itten 78' | Report | Rouiller (yellow card) 10' | Stadium: Stadion Wankdorf; Attendance: 26,212; Referee: (Switzerland) Fedayi San |

| 27 August 2022 6 | Servette | 3–1 | Grasshopper | Lancy |
| 20:30 CET | Bauer (yellow card) 42'; Antunes 44'; Douline (yellow card) 65'; Stevanović 79'; Valls (yellow card) 90+5'; Fofana 90+6' | Report | Loosli (yellow card) 16' (yellow-red card) 84'; Severin 20' (o.g.); Bolla (yellow card) 74' | Stadium: Stade de Genève; Attendance: 6,450; Referee: (Switzerland) Sven Wolfensberger |

| 4 September 2022 7 | Luzern | 0–2 | Servette | Lucerne |
| 14:15 CET | Simani (red card) 90+6' | Report | Cognat 29'; Douline (yellow card) 41'; Rodelin (yellow card) 52'; Pflücke (yellow card) 81'; Clichy (yellow card) 85'; Crivelli 90+1' | Stadium: Swissporarena; Attendance: 11,946; Referee: (Switzerland) Urs Schnyder |

| 11 September 2022 8 | Servette | 3–2 | Zürich | Lancy |
| 14:15 CET | Cognat 2'; Bauer 43'; Crivelli (yellow card) 75'; Douline (yellow card) 87' (goal) 90+5' | Report | Okita 21' 50' (yellow card) 55' (yellow-red card) 72'; Boranijašević (yellow card) 57'; Aliti (yellow card) 64' | Stadium: Stade de Genève; Attendance: 10,168; Referee: (Switzerland) Fedayi San |

| 2 October 2022 9 | Lugano | 1–0 | Servette | Lugano |
| 16:30 CET | Sabbatini 35'; Daprelà (yellow card) 46'; Doumbia (yellow card) 70' | Report | Valls (yellow card) 23'; Vouilloz (yellow card) 76'; Diallo (yellow card) 86' | Stadium: Stadio di Cornaredo; Attendance: 3,340; Referee: (Switzerland) Alain Bieri |

| 9 October 2022 10 | Servette | 1–1 | Luzern | Lancy |
| 14:15 CET | Douline (yellow card) 28'; Kutesa 30'; Cognat (yellow card) 62' | Report | Frýdek (yellow card) 22'; Beloko (yellow card) 58'; Meyer 59' | Stadium: Stade de Genève; Attendance: 8,457; Referee: (Switzerland) Fedayi San |

| 16 October 2022 11 | Servette | 0–0 | Basel | Lancy |
| 16:30 CET | Douline (yellow card) 80' | Report | Calafiori (yellow card) 9'; Augustin (yellow card) 10'; Arnau Comas (yellow card) 19' | Stadium: Stade de Genève; Attendance: 10,842; Referee: (Switzerland) Urs Schnyder |

| 20 October 2022 12 | Grasshopper | 2–3 | Servette | Zürich |
| 20:30 CET | Kawabe 67' 72' | Report | Fofana 56' 60' (pen.); Pflücke 77'; Diallo (yellow card) 90+2' | Stadium: Stadion Letzigrund; Attendance: 3,086; Referee: (Switzerland) Stefan Horisberger |

| 23 October 2022 13 | St. Gallen | 1–1 | Servette | St. Gallen |
| 16:30 CET | Vallci (yellow card) 45'; Pflücke 53' (o.g.) | Report | Kutsea 41'; Cognat (yellow card) 64'; Céspedes (yellow card) 77'; Douline (yellow card) 90+1'; Clichy (yellow card) 90+3' | Stadium: Kybunpark; Attendance: 16,679; Referee: (Switzerland) Fedayi San |

| 29 October 2022 14 | Servette | 2–2 | Lugano | Lancy |
| 20:30 CET | Rouiller 3' (red card) 44'; Stevanović 26'; Diogo Monteiro (yellow card) 68' | Report | Hajdari (yellow card) 23'; Celar 41'; Valenzuela (yellow card) 51' (yellow-red card) 87'; Sabbatini (yellow card) 61'; Doumbia 82' | Stadium: Stade de Genève; Attendance: 5,842; Referee: (Switzerland) Lukas Fähndrich |

| 6 November 2022 15 | Servette | 0–0 | Young Boys | Lancy |
| 14:15 CET | Rodelin (yellow card) 81' | Report | Itten (red card) 18'; Zesiger (yellow card) 66'; Rieder (yellow card) 88' | Stadium: Stade de Genève; Attendance: 16,214; Referee: (Switzerland) Urs Schnyder |

| 13 November 2022 16 | Zürich | 4–1 | Servette | Zürich |
| 14:15 CET | Tosin 31' 62' 86'; Katić 50' | Report | Stevanović (yellow card) 38' (goal) 88' | Stadium: Letzigrund; Attendance: 12,776; Referee: (Switzerland) Mirel Turkes |

| 29 January 2023 18 | Servette | 2–2 | Sion | Lancy |
| 16:30 CET | Bedia 17' 33'; Kutsea (yellow card) 70'; Diallo (yellow card) 75' | Report | Cavaré (yellow card) 26'; Grgić (yellow card) 30'; Cyprien (yellow card) 41' (yellow-red card) 41'; Sio 50'; Balotelli (yellow card) 84'; Douline 85' (o.g.) | Stadium: Stade de Genève; Attendance: 14,592; Referee: (Switzerland) Urs Schnyder |

===== Second half of season =====
| 4 February 2023 Round 19 | St. Gallen | 3–0 | Servette | St. Gallen |
| 20:30 CET | Görtler 8'; Guillemenot 39' (pen.) (yellow card) 45+4'; Geubbels (yellow card) 76' (goal) 89' | Report | Céspedes (yellow card) 26' (yellow-red card) 64'; Kutsea (yellow card) 45+3'; Théo Magnin (yellow card) 60' | Stadium: Kybunpark; Attendance: 14,806; Referee: (Switzerland) Sven Wolfensberger |

| 11 February 2023 Round 20 | Servette | 2–1 | Grasshopper | Lancy |
| 18:00 CET | Bedia 30' (yellow card) 40' (goal) 59'; Diallo (yellow card) 45'; Cognat (yellow card) 90+1' | Report | Tomás Ribeiro (yellow card) 18'; Dadashov 57' (pen.); Guilherme Schettine (yellow card) 71'; Ndenge (yellow card) 77' | Stadium: Stade de Genève; Attendance: 5,014; Referee: (Switzerland) Lukas Fähndrich |

| 15 February 2023 Round 17 | Winterthur | 1–2 | Servette | Winterthur |
| 18:45 CET | Ardaiz 53'; Gantenbein (yellow card) 72' | Report | Antunes (yellow card) 52'; Stevanović 63'; Valls 77' | Stadium: Stadion Schützenwiese; Attendance: 7,800; Referee: (Switzerland) Stefan Horisberger |

| 19 February 2023 Round 21 | Basel | 2–2 | Servette | St. Jakob-Park, Basel |
| 16:30 | Amdouni 51'; Zeqiri 61'; Frei (yellow card) 88' (yellow-red card) 90+7'; Kasim Adams (yellow card) 90+5' | SFL summary FCB report | Antunes 20'; Rouiller (yellow card) 53'; Mbabu (yellow card) 59'; Cognat (yellow card) 71'; Bedia 90+6' (pen.) | Attendance: 19,443; Referee: (Switzerland) Sandro Schärer (Buttikon) |

| 26 February 2023 Round 22 | Servette | 1–1 | Winterthur | Stade de Genève, Geneva |
| 16:30 | Severin 42'; Crivelli (yellow card) 69' | SFL summary | (yellow card) 44' Schmid; 52' Ardaiz; (yellow card) 77' Ramizi; (yellow card) 81' Arnold | Attendance: 6,123; Referee: (Switzerland) Esther Staubli |

| 5 March 2023 Round 23 | Zürich | 1–1 | Servette | Letzigrund, Zürich |
| 16:30 | Aliti (yellow card) 66'; Junior Ligue 78'; Mathew (yellow card) 83' | SFL summary | (yellow card) 11' Kutesa; 73' Crivelli; (yellow card) 85' Cognat; (yellow card) 88' Rouiller | Attendance: 13,780; Referee: (Switzerland) Stefan Horisberger |

| 12 March 2023 Round 24 | Servette | 0–3 Forfait | Luzern | Stade de Genève, Geneva |
| 16:30 | Céspedes (yellow card) 46'; Mbabu (yellow card) 50' (yellow-red card) 77'; Crivelli (red card) 88' | SFL summary | 51' (pen.) Meyer; (yellow card) 70' (yellow-red card) 90+5' Dräger; (yellow card) 88' Beka | Attendance: 6,803; Referee: (Switzerland) Sandro Schärer (Buttikon) |
Note: The Disciplinary Committee of the Swiss Football League converted Servette FC's 1-0 defeat into a 3-0 defeat by forfait. Servette fielded a player from the 75th minute Hussayn Touati who was not listed on the official match sheet and was therefore not eligible to play according to Article 34 Paragraph 4 of the SFV competition regulations.

| 19 March 2023 Round 25 | Lugano | 1–1 | Servette | Cornaredo, Lugano |
| 16:30 | Hajrizi (yellow card) 9'; Macek (yellow card) 60'; Arigoni (yellow card) 71'; Celar 90' | SFL summary | (yellow card) 21' Antunes; (yellow card) 45+1' Céspedes; (yellow card) 58' Bedia; 74' Valls | Attendance: 2,814; Referee: (Switzerland) Mirel Turkes |

| 1 April 2023 Round 26 | Servette | 2–1 | Young Boys | Stade de Genève, Geneva |
| 18:00 | Antunes (yellow card) 34'; Céspedes (yellow card) 56'; Bedia 69'; Pflücke 84' | SFL summary | (yellow card) 13' Rieder; 25' Nsame; (yellow card) 53' Nsame; (yellow card) 67' Amenda; (yellow card) 82' Blum | Attendance: 9,189; Referee: (Switzerland) Luca Cibelli; Assistant referees: (VAR) (Switzerland) Urs Schnyder |

| 8 April 2023 Round 27 | Sion | 2–2 | Servette | Stade Tourbillon, Sion |
| 20:30 | Grgić 34'; Itaitinga (yellow card) 36'; Lavanchy (yellow card) 44'; Itaitinga 56'; Grgić (yellow card) 90+3' | SFL summary | 23' Crivelli; (yellow card) 33' Vouilloz; (yellow card) 46' Cognat; 69' Stevanović; (yellow card) 83' Stevanović | Attendance: 11,850; Referee: (Switzerland) Sven Wolfensberger; Assistant referees: (VAR) (Switzerland) Sandro Schärer |

| 15 April 2023 Round 28 | Servette | 0–0 | Lugano | Stade de Genève, Geneva |
| 18:00 | | SFL summary | (yellow card) 42' Hajrizi; (yellow card) 90+2' Macek | Attendance: 4,141; Referee: (Switzerland) Urs Schnyder; Assistant referees: (VAR) (Switzerland) Stefan Horisberger |

| 22 April 2023 Round 29 | Young Boys | 6–1 | Servette | Stadion Wankdorf, Bern |
| 20:30 | Imeri 11'; Itten 13'; Fassnacht 16'; Niasse (yellow card) 26'; Rieder (yellow card) 29'; Itten 44'; Itten 57'; Frick 80' (o.g.) | SFL summary | 62' Pflücke; (yellow card) 82' Pflücke | Attendance: 27,883; Referee: (Switzerland) Sandro Schärer; Assistant referees: (VAR) (Switzerland) Lukas Fähndrich |

| 26 April 2023 Round 30 | Servette | 4–0 | Zürich | Stade de Genève, Geneva |
| 20:30 | Bedia 1'; Pflücke 38'; Bedia 54'; Touati 85' | SFL summary | (yellow card) 43' Aliti; (yellow card) 57' Šimić; (yellow card) 66' Selnæs | Attendance: 4,818; Referee: (Switzerland) Alessandro Dudic; Assistant referees: (VAR) (Switzerland) Stephan Klossner |

| 29 April 2023 Round 31 | Servette | 1–1 | St. Gallen | Stade de Genève, Geneva |
| 20:30 | Mbabu (yellow card) 26'; Bedia 42'; Clichy (yellow card) 58'; Diba (yellow card) 90+1' | SFL summary | (yellow card) 23' Witzig; 28' Witzig; (yellow card) 88' Görtler | Attendance: 7,072; Referee: (Switzerland) Sandro Schärer; Assistant referees: (VAR) (Switzerland) Lukas Fähndrich |

| 7 May 2023 Round 32 | Grasshopper | 2–3 | Servette | Letzigrund, Zürich |
| 16:30 CEST (UTC+2) | Shabani 7'; Dadashov (yellow card) 39'; Morandi 67'; Demhasaj (yellow card) 90+5' | SFL summary | 40' Severin; 51', 82' Stevanovic | Attendance: 4,840; Referee: (Switzerland) Anojen Kanagasingam; Assistant referees: (VAR) (Switzerland) Lukas Fähndrich |

| 13 May 2023 Round 33 | Servette | 5–0 | Sion | Stade de Genève, Geneva |
| 20:30 | Pflücke 5'; Kutesa 8'; Clichy 9'; Stevanović 70'; Crivelli 85' (pen.) | SFL summary | (yellow card) 29' Karlen; (yellow card) 33' Costa | Attendance: 14,188; Referee: (Switzerland) Urs Schnyder; Assistant referees: (VAR) (Switzerland) Alessandro Dudic |

| 20 May 2023 Round 34 | Winterthur | v | Servette | Stadion Schützenwiese, Winterthur |
| 18:00 | | | | Assistant referees: (VAR) |

| 25 May 2023 Round 35 | Servette | 3–3 | Basel | Stade de Genève, Geneva |
| 20:30 | Stevanović (yellow card) 23'; Bedia 41'; Pflücke (yellow card) 45+1'; Touati 73'; Stevanović 81'; Crivelli (yellow card) 86'; Touati (yellow card) 90' | SFL summary FCB report | 43' Amdouni; (yellow card) 61' Augustin; 69' Burger; 88' Amdouni | Attendance: 12,353; Referee: (Switzerland) Esther Staubli; Assistant referees: (VAR) (Switzerland) Sven Wolfensberger |

=== Swiss Cup ===
| 19 August 2022 Round 1 | Stade Nyonnais | 1–4 | Servette | Nyon |
| 19:30 CET | Christian Gomis 87' | Report | Antunes 21'; Rodelin 25'; Stevanović 54'; Pflücke 74' | Stadium: Colovray Sports Centre; Attendance: 1,850; Referee: (Switzerland) Alain Bieri |

| 17 September 2022 Round 2 | La Chaux-de-Fonds | 0–2 | Servette | La Chaux-de-Fonds |
| 18:00 CET | Fabio Lo Vacco (yellow card) 33'; Charles Noundou (yellow card) 37'; Numa Doutaz (yellow card) 49' | Report | Rouiller 49'; Fofana (yellow card) 52'; Crivelli 67' | Stadium: Stade de la Charrière; Attendance: 2,100; Referee: (Switzerland) Mirel Turkes |

| 9 November 2022 Round 3 | Wohlen | 2–5 (a.e.t.) | Servette | Wohlen |
| 20:15 CET | Vogt 12'; Anton Sytnykov (yellow card) 67'; Antoliy Kozlenko (yellow card) 96'; Justin Pfister 109' | Report | Diogo Monteiro (yellow card) 27'; Vouilloz (yellow card) 69'; Fofana 76' (yellow card) 93'; Céspedes 92'; Kutesa 101' (pen.); Pflücke 104'; Alexandre Dias Patricio 117' | Stadium: Stadion Niedermatten; Referee: (Switzerland) Alain Bieri |

| 2 March 2023 Quarter-finals | FC Rotkreuz | 0–3 | Servette | Risch-Rotkreuz |
| 20:15 CET | | | 33' Crivelli; 39' Stevanovic; 75' Pflücke | Stadium: Sportpark/Dorfmatt |

| 5 April 2023 Semi-finals | Servette | 2–2 (a.e.t.) (3–5 p) | FC Lugano | Geneva |
| 20:15 CEST (UTC+1) | Kutesa 22'; Crivelli 90+7' | Report | 31', 40' Aliseda | Stadium: Stade de Genève; Attendance: 12,500; Referee: Fedayi San |
| | Penalties |
| | Stevanovic (penalty scored); Pflücke (penalty scored); Crivelli (penalty scored); Mbabu (penalty missed) | | (penalty scored) Celar; (penalty scored) Bottani; (penalty scored) Amoura; (penalty scored) Macek; (penalty scored) Sabbatini |
