= 2025–26 Servette FC season =

Servette FC
2025–26 season
- Manager: Thomas Häberli (until 4 August); Jocelyn Gourvennec (from 11 August)
- Stadium: Stade de Genève
- Swiss Super League: 8th
- Swiss Cup: Second round
- UEFA Champions League: Second qualifying round
- UEFA Europa League: Third qualifying round
- UEFA Conference League: Play-off round
- Top goalscorer: League: Miroslav Stevanović (11); All: Miroslav Stevanović (12)
- Average home league attendance: 7,773
Home colours	Away colours	Third colours
- All statistics correct as of 6 April 2026.

The 2025–26 season was the 136th season in the history of Servette FC, and the club's seventh consecutive season in the Swiss Super League. In addition to the domestic league, the team also participated in the Swiss Cup, the 2025–26 UEFA Champions League, the UEFA Europa League, and the UEFA Conference League.

== Summary ==
On 4 August 2025, Thomas Häberli was sacked as manager of Servette. On 11 August 2025, Jocelyn Gourvennec was named the head coach of Servette FC.

== Current squad ==
As of 31 January, 2026

Note: Flags indicate national team as defined under FIFA eligibility rules; some limited exceptions apply. Players may hold more than one non-FIFA nationality.

No.	Pos.	Nation	Player
1	GK	CYP	Joël Mall
2	DF	SUI	Loun Srdanovic
4	DF	SUI	Steve Rouiller (captain)
5	MF	CMR	Gaël Ondoua
6	DF	GLP	Anthony Baron
7	MF	SUI	Giotto Morandi
8	MF	FRA	Timothé Cognat
9	MF	BIH	Miroslav Stevanović
11	MF	FRA	Lamine Fomba
14	DF	CMR	Lilian Njoh
15	DF	SUI	Marco Burch
17	DF	GBS	Houboulang Mendes
18	DF	CGO	Bradley Mazikou

No.	Pos.	Nation	Player
19	DF	FRA	Yoan Severin
21	FW	SUI	Jérémy Guillemenot
25	DF	TUN	Dylan Bronn
28	MF	FRA	David Douline
30	MF	GAM	Ablie Jallow
32	GK	SUI	Jérémy Frick
34	DF	FRA	Téo Allix
39	FW	SUI	Mardochée Miguel
40	GK	SUI	Marwan Aubert
45	FW	SUI	Jamie Atangana
90	FW	SVK	Samuel Mráz
97	FW	FRA	Florian Ayé

== Transactions ==
=== Transfers in ===
Pos.	Player	Transferred from	Notes	Date	Source
MF	(Slovakia) Samuel Mráz	(Poland) Motor Lublin	Free transfer		
MF	(The Gambia) Ablie Jallow	(France) FC Metz	Transfer	1 July 2025	
MF	(France) Lamine Fomba	(France) AS Saint-Étienne	Transfer	25 July 2025	
DF	(Cameroon) Lilian Njoh	(Italy) Salernitana	Transfer	31 July 2025	
FW	(France) Florian Ayé	(France) AJ Auxerre	Transfer	8 August 2025	

=== Transfers out ===
Pos.	Player	Transferred to	Notes	Date	Source
MF	(Switzerland) Dereck Kutesa	(Greece) AEK Athens	Transfer	22 May 2025	
DF	(Japan) Keigo Tsunemoto	(Switzerland) FC Basel	Transfer	1 July 2025	
DF	(France) Théo Magnin	(France) Red Star FC	Transfer	1 February 2026	

== Friendlies ==
2 July 2025	Servette	1–0	Étoile Carouge
	Goal

9 July 2025	Servette	0–4	FC Stade Lausanne Ouchy
			Goal

12 July 2025	Servette	1–0	Grenoble Foot 38
			Goal

15 July 2025	Servette	3–2	Neuchâtel Xamax FCS
	Goal		Goal

18 July 2025	Servette	3–2	AS Saint-Étienne
	Goal		Goal

== Competitions ==
=== Swiss Super League ===
==== League table ====
Pos	Team	Pld	W	D	L	GF	GA	GD	Pts	Qualification or relegation (Note: Teams play each other three times (33 matches), before the league is split into two groups (the top six and the bottom six).)
6	Young Boys	38	15	10	13	80	69	+11	55	
7	Luzern	38	14	11	13	76	66	+10	53	
8	Servette	38	13	14	11	71	63	+8	53	
9	Lausanne-Sport	38	11	9	18	53	67	−14	42	
10	Zürich	38	11	5	22	49	72	−23	38	

Source: Brack Super League - Tabelle
Rules for classification: 1) Points; 2) Goal difference; 3) Goals scored; 4) Head-to-head goal difference; 5) Head-to-head goals scored 6) Away goals scored; 7) Draw.

==== Matches ====
26 July 2025 1	BSC Young Boys	3–1	Servette	Stadion Wankdorf
	Fassnacht 10' (pen.); Maleš 14'; Virginius 84'		Mazikou (red card) 8'; Mráz 36'	Attendance: 29,097; Referee: Luca Piccolo

2 August 2025 2	Servette	1–4	FC St. Gallen	Stade de Genève
	Stevanović 27'	Report	Geubbels 11', 18'; Vogt 30'; Baldé 90+6' (pen.)	Attendance: 7,289; Referee: Luca Cibelli

10 August 2025 3	Servette	1–1	Grasshopper	Stade de Genève, Lancy
16:30 CEST (UTC+2)	Ayé (penalty missed) 56'; Fomba 74'	Report	(yellow card) 16' Stroscio; 33' Decarli; (yellow card) 74' Hammel	Attendance: 6,478; Referee: Johannes von Mandach; Assistant referees: Alessandro Dudic (VAR)
Note: Originally scheduled for 9 August 2025 (18:00 kickoff). Rescheduled on 31 July 2025.

31 August 2025 4	Servette	2–2	FC Luzern	Stade de Genève
	Antunes 58'; Stevanović 89'	Report	Spadanuda 5'; Di Giusto 75'	Attendance: 7,809; Referee: Alessandro Dudic

13 September 2025 5	Zürich	2–1	Servette	Zurich
	Tsawa 28', 43'; Bangoura (red card) 84'; Sauter (yellow card) (red card) 90+6'	Report	Severin 80'	Stadium: Letzigrund; Attendance: 13,141; Referee: Urs Schnyder

17 September 2025 6	FC Sion	0–2	Servette	Stade de Tourbillon
			Mráz 59', 67'	Attendance: 10,000; Referee: Luca Cibelli

27 September 2025 7	Servette	4–0	FC Winterthur	Stade de Genève
	Ayé 8', 61'; Stevanović 49'; Varela 58'	Report		Attendance: 6,500; Referee: Fedayi San

5 October 2025 8	Servette	0–3	Basel	Stade de Genève, Geneva
16:30	Cognat (yellow card) 28'	FCB summary	5' Ajeti; (yellow card) 17' Agbonifo; 41' Otele; (yellow card) 45+1' Barišić; 59' Otele	Attendance: 12,120; Referee: (Switzerland) Anojen Kanagasingam

18 October 2025 9	FC Thun	3–1	Servette	Stockhorn Arena
	Imeri 7'; Labeau 18'; Meichtry 90+3'	Report	Stevanović 6'	Attendance: 8,609; Referee: Nico Gianforte

26 October 2025 10	Servette	2–1	FC Lugano	Stade de Genève
	Ayé 11', 82'	Report	Grgić 37'	Attendance: 7,069; Referee: Luca CibellWi

29 October 2025 11	FC Lausanne-Sport	1–3	Servette	Stade de la Tuilière
	Lekweiry 57'	Report	Ayé 49'; Poaty 77' (o.g.); Mráz 90+4'	Attendance: 7,051; Referee: Anojen Kanagasingam

1 November 2025 12	FC Winterthur	4–2	Servette	Stadion Schützenwiese
	Golliard 52', 54'; Schneider 69'; Maluvunu 90+3'	Report	Ayé 40'; Douline 90+1'	Attendance: 7,200; Referee: Alessandro Dudic

8 November 2025 13	Servette FC	0–1	FC Thun	Stade de Genève
		Report	Bertone 90'	Attendance: 6,820; Referee: Désirée Blanco

22 November 2025 14	FC Luzern	2–2	Servette FC	Swissporarena
	von Moos 2'; Di Giusto 9'		Cognat 57'; Ayé 72'	Attendance: 10,014; Referee: Sandro Schärer

30 November 2025 15	Servette FC	4–4	BSC Young Boys	Stade de Genève
	Guillemenot 12', 61'; Ayé 33'; Mráz 84'	Report	Fassnacht 26'; Sanches 45+3'; Bedia 57'; Hadjam 68'	Attendance: 9,420; Referee: Lukas Fähndrich

6 December 2025 16	Grasshopper	0–1	Servette	Letzigrund, Zürich
18:00 CET (UTC+1)	Meyer (yellow card) 28'	Report	21' Rouiller	Attendance: 2,958; Referee: Lionel Tschudi; Assistant referees: Nico Gianforte (VAR)

14 December 2025 17	FC Lugano	4–2	Servette FC	Cornaredo Stadium
	Papadopoulos 5', 52'; Grgić 18' (pen.); Bislimi 24'		Douline 40'; Mráz 70'	Attendance: 2,248; Referee: Urs Schnyder

20 December 2025 18	Basel	1–1	Servette	St. Jakob-Park, Basel
20:30	Otele (yellow card) 42'; Traoré 64' (1:1); Salah (yellow card) 90+4'	FCB summary	29' (0:1) Guillemenot; (yellow card) 33' Cognat; (yellow card) 51' Allix; (yellow card) 68' Rouiller; (yellow card) 85' Ishuayed	Attendance: 24,103; Referee: (Switzerland) Sven Wolfensberger

14 January 2026 19	Servette	0–1	FC Lausanne-Sport	Stade de Genève
	Miguel (yellow card) (red card) 37'	Report	Ayé 64' (o.g.)	Attendance: 8,122; Referee: Sandro Schärer

18 January 2026 20	Servette FC	1–1	FC Zürich	Stade de Genève
	Burch 20'	Report	Reverson 28'; Kamberi 72'	Attendance: 8,340; Referee: Johannes von Mandach

25 January 2026 21	FC St. Gallen	2–4	Servette FC	Kybunpark
	Görtler 2'; Stanić 15'	Report	Guillemenot 46', 80' (pen.); Stevanović 83'; Douline 90+2'	Attendance: 15,290; Referee: Mirel Turkes

31 January 2026 22	Servette FC	3–3	FC Sion	Stade de Genève
	Stevanović 25'; Guillemenot 35'; Jallow 86'	Report	Rouiller 5' (o.g.); Lavanchy 58'; Boteli 90+4'	Attendance: 10,210; Referee: Luca Cibeli

8 February 2026 23	Servette	1–3	FC Thun	Stade de Genève
	Jallow (red card) 67'; Atangana 90+2' (pen.)	Report	Rastoder 40'; Bürki 47'; Reichmuth 88'	Attendance: 6,229; Referee: Alessandro Dudic

11 February 2026 24	FC Lugano	1–1	Servette FC	Cornaredo Stadium
	Behrens 13'	Report	Mráz 77'	Attendance: 2,759; Referee: Urs Schnyder

15 February 2026 25	FC Lausanne-Sport	3–3	Servette FC	Stade de la Tuilière
	Roche 28' (pen.); Traoré 39'; Janneh 73'; Beloko (yellow card) (red card) 89'	Report	Mráz 20'; Burch (red card) 27'; Stevanović 59', 90+1'	Attendance: 7,949; Referee: Anojen Kanagasingam

21 February 2026 26	Servette	1–1	FC St. Gallen	Stade de Genève
	Rouiller 6'	Report	Witzig 4'	Attendance: 6,150; Referee: Luca Cibelli

28 February 2026 27	Servette FC	0–0	FC Sion	Stade de Genève
		Report		Attendance: 8,087; Referee: Lukas Fähndrich

3 March 2026 28	FC Winterthur	1–1	Servette FC	Stadion Schützenwiese
	Buess 54'; Kryeziu (red card) 63'	Report	Ayé 79'	Attendance: 6,700; Referee: Sandro Schärer

7 March 2026 29	Servette	2–1	FC Zurich	Stade de Genève
	Kadile 2', 88'	Report	Kény 74' (pen.)	Attendance: 5,200; Referee: Mirel Turkes

15 March 2026 30	FC Basel	3–1	Servette	St. Jakob-Park
	Schmid 45'; Mall 48' (o.g.); Metinho 90'	Report	Mráz 88'	Attendance: 24,545; Referee: Nico Gianforte

21 March 2026 31	Servette	5–0	Grasshopper Club Zurich	Stade de Genève
	Kadile 8', 10'; Stevanović 13', 72'; Ayé 18'	Report		Attendance: 6,674; Referee: Marijan Drmic

6 April 2026 32	Servette	3–0	FC Luzern	Stade de Genève
	Stevanović 40'; Cognat 46'; Kadile 90+7'	Report		Attendance: 8,032; Referee: Luca Cibelli

12 April 2026 33	BSC Young Boys	1–1	Servette	Stadion Wankdorf
	Bedia 71' (pen.)	Report	Lopes 59'	Attendance: 25,343; Referee: Nico Gianforte

League Split

26 April 2026 34	Servette	5–3	FC Winterthur	Stade de Genève
	Stevanovic 21', 25'; Ayé 29'; Rouiller 50'; Lopes 62'	Report	Burkart 32', 39'; Jankewitz 51'	Referee: Johannes von Mandach

3 May 2026 35	Grasshoppers	0–2	Servette	Letzigrund
	Arigoni (red card) 33'	Report	Ullmann 33' (o.g.); Lopes 51'	Attendance: 4,665; Referee: Sven Wolfensberger

9 May 2026 36	FC Luzern	3–3	Servette	Swissporarena
	Winkler 67'; Bajrami 73'; Kabwit 81'	Report	Stevanović 11'; Lopes 39'; Njoh 79'	Attendance: 10,354; Referee: Hüseyin Sanli

12 May 2026 37	Servette	2–0	FC Lausanne-Sport	Stade de Genève
	Douline 61'; Mráz 65'	Report		Attendance: 10,112; Referee: Luca Cibelli

16 May 2026 38	FC Zürich	0–2	Servette	Letzigrund
	Cavaleiro (red card) 36'	Report	Guillemenot 26'; Kadile 88'	Referee: Luca Piccolo

=== Swiss Cup ===
17 August 2025 First round	FC Dardania Lausanne	0–5	Servette
		Report	Stevanović 35'; Jallow 44'; Ayé 47'; Bronn 74'; Vincent 87'

20 September 2025 Second round	Yverdon-Sport FC	1–0	Servette
	Sessolo 59'	Report

=== UEFA Champions League ===
==== League Path matches ====
22 July 2025	Viktoria Plzeň (Czech Republic)	0–1	(Switzerland) Servette	Doosan Arena, Plzeň
19:00		Report	Mráz 13'	Attendance: 11,055; Referee: Nikola Dabanović (Montenegro)

30 July 2025	Servette (Switzerland)	1–3	(Czech Republic) Viktoria Plzeň	Stade de Genève, Geneva
21:00	Antunes 4'	Report	Spáčil 28'; Vydra 31'; Durosinmi 87' (pen.)	Attendance: 11,716; Referee: Alejandro Muñiz Ruiz (Spain)

=== UEFA Europa League ===
==== Main Path matches ====
7 August 2025	Servette (Switzerland)	1–3	(Netherlands) Utrecht	Stade de Genève, Geneva
20:30	Guillemenot 12'	Report	Baron 52' (o.g.); Horemans 55'; Zechiël 62'	Attendance: 11,744; Referee: Harm Osmers (Germany)

14 August 2025	Utrecht (Netherlands)	2–1	(Switzerland) Servette	Stadion Galgenwaard, Utrecht
20:00	Jensen 57', 74'	Report	Jallow 80' (pen.)	Attendance: 21,800; Referee: Chris Kavanagh (England)

=== UEFA Conference League ===
==== Main Path matches ====
21 August 2025	Shakhtar Donetsk (Ukraine)	1–1	(Switzerland) Servette	Henryk Reyman Municipal Stadium, Kraków, Poland (Note: Due to the Russian invasion of Ukraine, Ukrainian teams were required to play their home matches at neutral venues until further notice.)
20:00	Bondar 73'	Report	Fomba 8'	Attendance: 8,392; Referee: Nick Walsh (Scotland)

28 August 2025	Servette (Switzerland)	1–2 (a.e.t.)	(Ukraine) Shakhtar Donetsk	Stade de Genève, Geneva
21:00	Njoh 53'	Report	Kevin 70' (pen.); Elias 113'	Attendance: 13,224; Referee: Guillermo Cuadra Fernández (Spain)
