= 2024–25 Servette FC season =

Servette FC
2024–25 season
- Manager: Thomas Häberli
- Stadium: Stade de Genève
- Swiss Super League: 2nd
- Swiss Cup: Second round
- UEFA Europa League: Third qualifying round
- UEFA Conference League: Play-off round
- Top goalscorer: League: Dereck Kutesa (15); All: Dereck Kutesa (17)
Home colours	Away colours	Third colours
- All statistics correct as of 29 May 2025.

The 2024–25 season was the 135th season in the history of Servette FC, and the club's sixth consecutive season in the Swiss Super League. In addition to the domestic league, the team also participated in the Swiss Cup, the UEFA Europa League, and the UEFA Conference League.

== Transfers ==
=== In ===
Pos.	Player	Transferred to	Fee	Date	Source
FW	(France) Hussayn Touati	(Switzerland) Wil	Loan return	30 June 2024	
FW	(France) Mamadou Simbakoli	(Switzerland) Étoile Carouge	Free	17 July 2024	
FW	(Nigeria) Victory Beniangba	(Belgium) Jong Genk	Loan	17 July 2024	

=== Out ===
Pos.	Player	Transferred to	Fee	Date	Source
FW	(France) Hussayn Touati	(Switzerland) Neuchâtel Xamax	Undisclosed	1 July 2024	
MF	(Denmark) Alexander Lyng	(Denmark) Sønderjyske Fodbold	Loan	1 July 2024	
GK	(Switzerland) Edin Omeragić	(Switzerland) Neuchâtel Xamax	Undisclosed	13 July 2024	

== Friendlies ==
6 July 2024 Friendly	Monaco	0–1	(Switzerland) Servette	France
11:00			Guillemenot 65'

9 July 2024 Friendly	Servette (Switzerland)	3–2	(Belgium) Westerlo
14:00

13 July 2024 Friendly	Étoile Carouge (Switzerland)	2–1	(Switzerland) Servette
18:00		Report		Attendance: 2,600

7 January 2025 Friendly	NAC Breda (Netherlands)	3–2	(Switzerland) Servette
15:00 CET	Balard 12'; Leemans 27'; Paula 87'	Report	Crivelli 59'; Ouattara 79'

10 January 2025 Friendly	Karlsruher SC (Germany)	1–3	(Switzerland) Servette	La Nucia
14:30 CET	Jensen (yellow card) 25'; Conté 41'	Report	Crivelli (yellow card) 4'; Antunes 13'; Stevanović 60'; von Moos 90+1'	Stadium: Estadi Olímpic Camilo Cano

== Competitions ==
=== Overall record ===
Competition	First match	Last match	Starting round	Record							
Competition	First match	Last match	Starting round	Pld	W	D	L	GF	GA	GD	Win %
Swiss Super League	21 July 2024	24 May 2025	Matchday 1	38	17	12	9	64	55	+9	44.74
Swiss Cup	18 August 2024	15 September 2024	First round	2	1	0	1	8	4	+4	50.00
UEFA Europa League	8 August 2024	15 August 2024	Third qualifying round	2	0	1	1	1	2	−1	0.00
UEFA Conference League	22 August 2024	29 August 2024	Play-off round	2	1	1	0	2	3	−1	50.00
Total				44	19	14	11	75	64	+11	43.18

Last updated: 31 December 2025
Source: Fotmob

=== Swiss Super League ===
==== League table ====
Pos	Team	Pld	W	D	L	GF	GA	GD	Pts	Qualification or relegation (Note: Teams play each other three times (33 matches), before the league is split into two groups (the top six and the bottom six).)
1	Basel (C)	38	22	7	9	91	43	+48	73	Qualification for the Champions League play-off round
2	Servette	38	17	12	9	64	55	+9	63	Qualification for the Champions League second qualifying round
3	Young Boys	38	17	10	11	60	49	+11	61	Qualification for the Europa League play-off round (Note: The 2024–25 Swiss Cup winner (Basel) qualifies for the Europa League play-off round. Since the cup winner finished in the top three, the remaining European berths were passed down to the next highest qualifying teams.)
4	Lugano	38	15	9	14	55	58	−3	54	Qualification for the Europa League second qualifying round
5	Lausanne-Sport	38	14	11	13	62	54	+8	53	Qualification for the Conference League second qualifying round

Source: Swiss Super League
Rules for classification: 1) Points; 2) Goal difference; 3) Goals scored; 4) Head-to-head goal difference; 5) Head-to-head goals scored 6) Away goals scored; 7) Draw.
(C) Champions

==== Results summary ====
Overall								Home						Away					
Pld	W	D	L	GF	GA	GD	Pts	W	D	L	GF	GA	GD	W	D	L	GF	GA	GD
38	17	12	9	64	125	−61	63	9	7	3	35	26	+9	8	5	6	29	99	−70

Last updated: 31 December 2025.
Source: Fotmob

==== Results by round ====
Round	1	2	3	4	5	6	7	8	9	10	11	12	13	14	15	16	17	18	19	20	21	22	23	24	25	26	27	28	29
Ground	A	H	A	H	H	A	A	H	A	H	A	H	A	H	A	H	H	A	H	A	H	A	H	A	H	A	A	H	
Result	W	W	L	L	W	W	D	W	D	W	W	D	L	D	L	W	D	L	D	D	D	D	W	W	W	W	W	L	
Position	4	3	5	7	7	3	5	4	4	2	1	2	3	4	4	3	3	5	5	5	4	4	4	4	4	2	1	1	

Updated to match(es) played on 15 March 2025. Source: worldfootball
A = Away; H = Home; W = Win; D = Draw; L = Loss

==== Matches ====
The match schedule was released on 18 June 2024.

21 July 2024 1	Luzern	1–2	Servette	Lucerne
16:30	Cigaņiks (yellow card) 36'; Meyer (yellow card) 37'; Medja (yellow card) 62'; Villiger 90+2'		Kutesa 4'; Rouiller 58'; Ondoua (yellow card) 70'; Baron (yellow card) 83'	Stadium: swissporarena Attendance: 10,254; Referee: Stefan Horisberger

24 July 2024 5	Servette	3–1	Young Boys	Lancy
20:30	Tsunemoto 32', (yellow card) 87'; Stevanović 40'; Mazikou (yellow card) 73'; Crivelli 79' (pen.)		Chaiwa (yellow card) 45+2'; Itten 71'; Zoukrou (yellow card) 75'; Blum (yellow card) 89'	Stadium: Stade de Genève; Attendance: 8,727; Referee: Fedayi San

28 July 2024 2	Servette	3–2	Yverdon-Sport	Lancy
14:15	Kutesa 12'; Sauthier 22' (o.g.); Stevanović 46'; Rouiller (red card) 45+1'		Céspedes 34' (pen.); Le Pogam 63'	Stadium: Stade de Genève; Attendance: 5,436; Referee: Nico Gianforte

3 August 2024 3	Lugano	3–1	Servette	Lugano
18:00	Mahmoud 73'; Mazikou 78' (o.g.); Steffen 84'		Kutesa 61'	Stadium: Cornaredo Stadium; Attendance: 3,334; Referee: Lionel Tschudi

11 August 2024 4	Servette	0–6	Basel	Lancy
16:30		Report	Barry 37'; Traoré 46'; Ajeti 63' 76'; Adjetey (yellow card) 69'; van Breemen (yellow card) 74'; Šotiček 81'; Kololli 87'	Stadium: Stade de Genève; Attendance: 8,327; Referee: (Switzerland) Mirel Turkes

1 September 2024 6	Winterthur	0–1	Servette	Winterthur
14:15 CET	Diaby (yellow card) 19'	Report	Crivelli 21' (Pen.); Mazikou (yellow card) 66'	Stadium: Stadion Schützenwiese; Attendance: 8,100; Referee: (Switzerland) Fedayi San

21 September 2024 7	Grasshopper	2–2	Servette	Zürich
18:00 CET	Choinière 23'; Lee Young-jun 54'; Morandi (yellow card) 72'	Report	Kutesea 34'; Douline (yellow card) 36'; Usman Simbakoli 45+11'; Cognat (yellow card) 72'; Ondoua (red card) 72'; Rouiller (yellow card) 85'	Stadium: Stadion Letzigrund; Attendance: 4,371; Referee: (Switzerland) Tobias Thies

28 September 2024 8	Servette	1–0	Lausanne-Sport	Lancy
18:00 CET	Kutesea 32'; Cognat (yellow card) 75'; Stevanović (yellow card) 90+1'	Report	Dussenne (yellow card) 21'; Giger (yellow card) 45+1'	Stadium: Stade de Genève; Attendance: 12,185; Referee: (Switzerland) Lukas Fähndrich

6 October 2024 9	St. Gallen	1–1	Servette	St. Gallen
16:30 CET	Görtler 21'; Ambrosius (yellow card) 48'; Vandermersch (yellow card) 60' (yellow-red card) 81'; Csoboth (yellow card) 77'	Report	Stevanović 46'; Tsunemoto (yellow card) 79'	Stadium: Kybunpark; Attendance: 18,380; Referee: (Switzerland) Stefan Horisberger

19 October 2024 10	Servette	3–0	Sion	Lancy
20:30 CET	Crivelli 5' (yellow card) 48'; Kutesa 50'; Stevanović (yellow card) 60'; Ondoua 85'; Usman Simbakoli (yellow card) 88'	Report	Ziegler (yellow card) 79'	Stadium: Stade de Genève; Attendance: 12,987; Referee: (Switzerland) Lukas Fähndrich

27 October 2024 11	Zürich	1–3	Servette	Zürich
16:30 CET	Gómez (yellow card) 64'; Condé (yellow card) 66'; Rodrigo Conceição (yellow card) 80'; Perea 90' (yellow card) 90+2'	Report	Rouiller (yellow card) 4'; Kutesa 32' 51'; Crivelli (yellow card) 62'; Mall (yellow card) 62'; Stevanović 65'	Stadium: Stadion Letzigrund; Attendance: 16,239; Referee: (Switzerland) Urs Schnyder

31 October 2024 12	Servette	2–2	Luzern	Lancy
20:30 CET	Stevanović 29'; Kutesa 79'	Report	Jaquez 37'; Levin Winkler (yellow card) 54'; Spadanuda 77'	Stadium: Stade de Genève; Attendance: 9,531; Referee: (Switzerland) Stefan Horisberger

3 November 2024 13	Lausanne-Sport	1–0	Servette	Lausanne
14:15 CET	Dussenne 17' (pen.); Mouanga (yellow card) 77'	Report	Rouiller (yellow card) 16'	Stadium: Stade de la Tuilière; Attendance: 11,274; Referee: (Switzerland) Lukas Fähndrich

9 November 2024 14	Servette	1–1	Zürich	Lancy
20:30 CET	Cognat 45+3'	Report	Krasniqi (yellow card) 35' (goal) 39'	Stadium: Stade de Genève; Attendance: 11,348; Referee: (Switzerland) Luca Cibelli

24 November 2024 15	Basel	3–1	Servette	Basel
16:30 CET	Barišić (yellow card) 32'; Shaqiri 40' 90+1' 90+2'	Report	Cognat 55' (yellow card) 69'	Stadium: St. Jakob-Park; Attendance: 26,247; Referee: (Switzerland) Lionel Tschudi

1 December 2024 16	Servette	3–0	Lugano	Lancy
16:30 CET	Kutesa (yellow card) 34'; Crivelli 55'; Mazikou (yellow card) 59'; Cognat (red card) 59'; Rouiller 82' 88'	Report	El Wafi (yellow card) 1'; Mai (yellow card) 10'; Doumbia (yellow card) 87'; Przybyłko (yellow card) 90'	Stadium: Stade de Genève; Attendance: 9,242; Referee: (Switzerland) Sven Wolfensberger

8 December 2024 17	Servette	1–1	Winterthur	Lancy
16:30 CET	Kutesea 9'; Magnin (yellow card) 66'	Report	Baroan 59'; Stillhart (yellow card) 68'	Stadium: Stade de Genève; Attendance: 7,085; Referee: (Switzerland) Stefan Horisberger

15 December 2024 18	Young Boys	2–1	Servette	Bern
14:15 CET	Maleš 37' 46' (yellow card) 82'; Athekame (yellow card) 68'	Report	Kutesa 6'	Stadium: Stadion Wankdorf; Attendance: 29,215; Referee: (Switzerland) Luca Cibelli

18 January 2025 19	Servette	1–1	St. Gallen	Lancy
20:30 CET	Severin (yellow card) 45'; Antunes (yellow card) 46'; Rouiller 70'; Stevanović (yellow card) 89'	Report	Noah Yannick (yellow card) 44'; Geubbels 47'; Ambrosius (yellow card) 50'	Stadium: Stade de Genève; Attendance: 8,527; Referee: (Switzerland) Anojen Kanagasingam

25 January 2025 20	Yverdon-Sport	0–0	Servette	Yverdon-les-Bains
18:00 CET	Kacuri (yellow card) 33'	Report	Antunes (yellow card) 63'; Guillemenot (yellow card) 90+7'	Stadium: Stade Municipal; Attendance: 3,070; Referee: (Switzerland) Stefan Horisberger

1 February 2025 21	Servette	1–1	Grasshopper	Lancy
20:30 CET	Mazikou (yellow card) 41'; Kutesa 55'; Rouiller (yellow card) 57'	Report	Schmitz (yellow card) 72'; Muci 86'	Stadium: Stade de Genève; Attendance: 7,628; Referee: (Switzerland) Désirée Grundbacher

4 February 2025 22	Sion	3–3	Servette	Sion
20:30 CET	Hajrizi 13' (yellow card) 27'; Kololli 85' (pen.) 89' (pen.)	Report	Antunes 45'; Stevanović 53'; Kasim Nuhu (yellow card) 83'; Crivelli 90+8' (pen.) (yellow card) 90+8'	Stadium: Stade de Tourbillon; Attendance: 10,000; Referee: (Switzerland) Lionel Tschudi

9 February 2025 23	Servette	2–1	Basel	Lancy
14:15 CET	Tsunemoto (yellow card) 27'; Cognat (yellow card) 46'; Antunes 50'; Kutesa 61' (yellow card) 61'	Report	Otele 73'; Schmid (yellow card) 79'	Stadium: Stade de Genève; Attendance: 10,021; Referee: (Switzerland) Sven Wolfensberger

16 February 2025 24	Grasshopper	1–2	Servette	Zürich
16:30 CET	Ndenge 28' (pen.) (yellow card) 64'; Irankunda (yellow card) 39'	Report	Mall (yellow card) 27'; Crivelli (yellow card) 64'; Magnin (yellow card) 74'; Stevanović 76'; Rouiller 79'	Stadium: Stadion Letzigrund; Attendance: 3,653; Referee: (Switzerland) Luca Piccolo

23 February 2025 25	Servette	3–1	Winterthur	Lancy
16:30 CET	Buhu (yellow card) 8'; Alioune Ndoye 69' 90+5' (pen.); Varela 89'	Report	Durrer (yellow card) 52'; Zuffi 63' (pen.); Sidler (yellow card) 87'	Stadium: Stade de Genève; Attendance: 7,812; Referee: (Switzerland) Lukas Fähndrich

1 March 2025 26	Lausanne-Sport	0–1	Servette	Lausanne
20:30 CET	Diabaté (yellow card) 48'	Report	Stevanović 14' (pen.); Mazikou (yellow card) 43'; Cognat (yellow card) 83'; Ouattara (yellow card) 90+4'	Stadium: Stade de la Tuilière; Attendance: 10,147; Referee: (Switzerland) Lionel Tschudi

9 March 2025 27	Zürich	1–3	Servette	Zürich
14:15 CET	Reverson 50'	Report	Stevanović 8'; Crivelli 43'; Cognat (yellow card) 56'; Nonge (yellow card) 76'; Alioune Ndoye 90+5'	Stadium: Stadion Letzigrund; Attendance: 14,902; Referee: (Switzerland) Fedayi San

=== Swiss Cup ===
18 August 2024 First round	Signal FC Bernex-Confignon	1–7	Servette	Geneva
14:30	Mikaël Valentin Barriviera 56'	Report	Usman Mamadou Simbakoli 18'; Guillemenot 28' (pen.); Kutesa 36'; von Moos 42', 48', 82'; Magnin 76'	Stadium: Stade municipal de Bernex

15 September 2024 Second round	Schaffhausen	2–1	Servette	Schaffhausen
14:30 CET	Severin 48' (o.g.); Iwan Hegglin (yellow card) 80'; Marc Giger 84'	Report	Guillemenot 11' (yellow card) 37' (yellow-red card) 61'; Rouiller (yellow card) 90+2'	Stadium: FCS Arena Schaffhausen; Referee: (Switzerland) Anojen Kanagasingam

=== UEFA Europa League ===
==== Third qualifying round ====
8 August 2024 First leg	Braga (Portugal)	0–0	(Switzerland) Servette	Braga, Portugal
20:30 UTC+1	Bruma (yellow card) 15'; El Ouazzani (yellow card) 78'; Zalazar (yellow card) 90+11'	Report	Rouiller (yellow card) 90+9'	Stadium: Estádio Municipal de Braga; Attendance: 16,603; Referee: Giorgi Kruashvili (Georgia)

15 August 2024 Second leg	Servette (Switzerland)	1–2 (1–2 agg.)	(Portugal) Braga	Lancy
20:30 UTC+2	Douline (yellow card) 62'; Antunes (yellow card) 62'; Crivelli (yellow card) 85'; Kutesa 90+1'	Report	El Ouazzani 45+1'; Zalazar (yellow card) 65'; Fernández 69', (yellow card) 71'	Stadium: Stade de Genève; Attendance: 15,179; Referee: Igor Pajač (Croatia)

=== UEFA Conference League ===
==== Play-off round ====
22 August 2024 First leg	Chelsea (England)	2–0	(Switzerland) Servette	London, England
20:00 UTC+1	Nkunku 50' (pen.); Madueke 76'; Dewsbury-Hall (yellow card) 90+2'	Report		Stadium: Stamford Bridge; Referee: Jérémie Pignard (France)

29 August 2024 Second leg	Servette (Switzerland)	2–1 (2–3 agg.)	(England) Chelsea	Lancy
20:30 UTC+2	Severin (yellow card) 9'; Guillemenot 32'; Crivelli (yellow card) 64', (goal) 72'; Douline (yellow card) 65'	Report	Nkunku 14' (pen.); Badiashile (yellow card) 18'; Jackson (yellow card) 74'; Veiga (yellow card) 85'	Stadium: Stade de Genève; Referee: Marco Di Bello (Italy)

== Statistics ==
=== Goalscorers ===
Rank	Pos.	Player	Super League	Swiss Cup	Europa League	Conference League	Total
1	MF	(Switzerland) Dereck Kutesa	13	1	1	0	15
2	FW	(France) Enzo Crivelli	5	0	0	1	6
2	MF	(Bosnia and Herzegovina) Miroslav Stevanović	6	0	0	0	6
4	DF	(Switzerland) Steve Rouiller	4	0	0	0	4
5	FW	(Switzerland) Jérémy Guillemenot	0	2	0	1	3
5	FW	(Switzerland) Julian von Moos	0	3	0	0	3
7	MF	(Switzerland) Alexis Antunes	2	0	0	0	2
7	MF	(France) Timothé Cognat	2	0	0	0	2
9	DF	(Switzerland) Théo Magnin	0	1	0	0	1
9	DF	(Cameroon) Gaël Ondoua	1	0	0	0	1
9	FW	(Central African Republic) Usman Simbakoli	0	1	0	0	1
9	DF	(Japan) Keigo Tsunemoto	1	0	0	0	1
Own goals			1	0	0	0	1
Totals			35	8	1	2	46
