= Enzo Crivelli =

French footballer (born 1995)

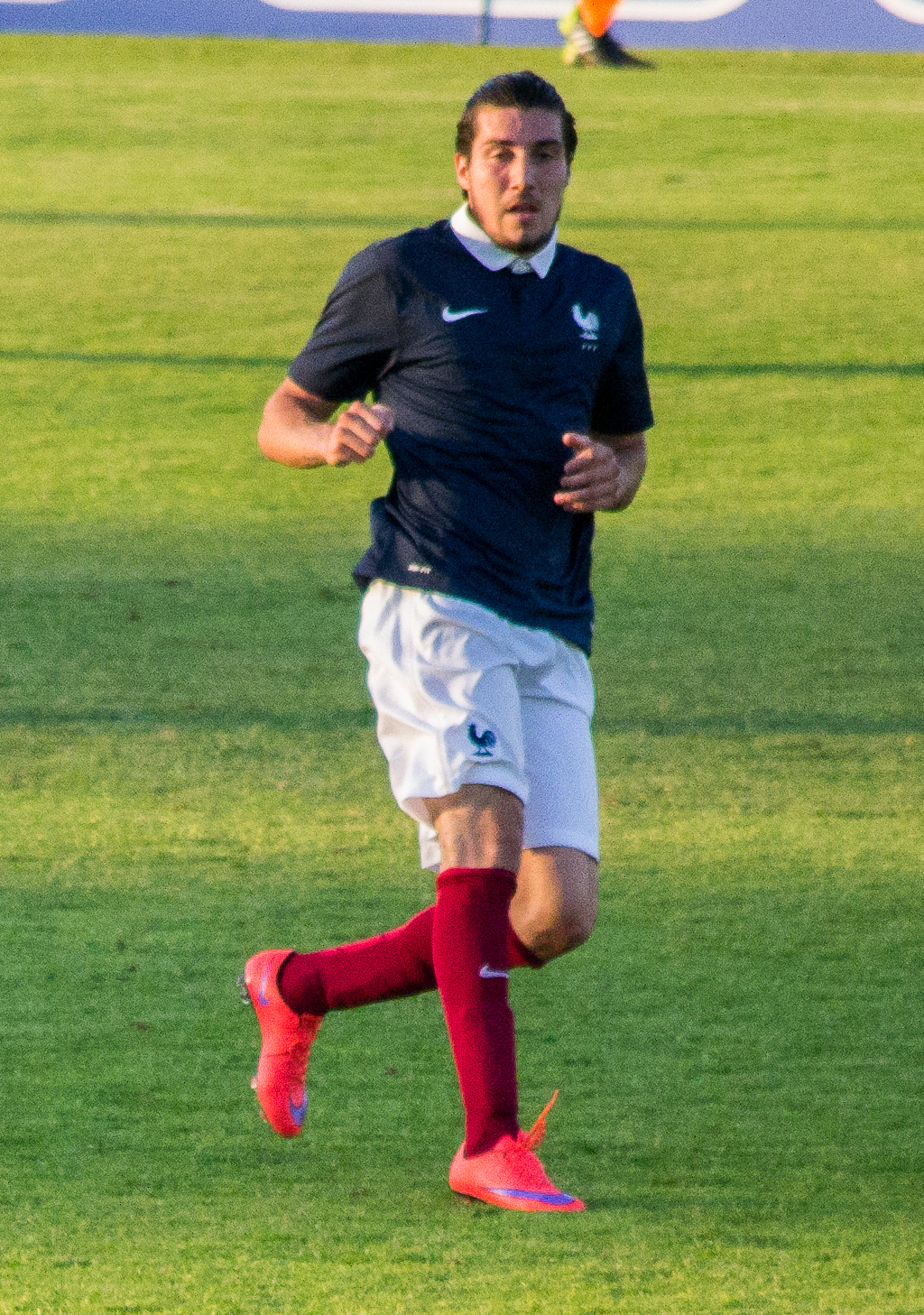
- Crivelli playing for France U21 in 2015

Personal information
- Full name: Enzo Vito Gabriel Crivelli
- Date of birth: 6 February 1995 (age 31)
- Place of birth: Rouen, France
- Height: 1.84 m (6 ft 0 in)
- Position: Forward

Youth career
- 2001–2004: ASPTT Albi
- 2004–2007: AS de la Fontaine Albi
- 2007–2012: Cannes
- 2012–2014: Bordeaux

Senior career*
Years	Team	Apps	(Gls)
2013–2015	Bordeaux B	30	(6)
2014–2017	Bordeaux	42	(4)
2016–2017	→ Bastia (loan)	24	(10)
2017–2018	Angers	15	(1)
2018	→ Caen (loan)	11	(2)
2018–2019	Caen	33	(6)
2019–2022	İstanbul Başakşehir	67	(13)
2021–2022	→ Antalyaspor (loan)	12	(0)
2022	→ Saint-Étienne (loan)	4	(0)
2022–2025	Servette	79	(20)
2025–2026	Sepahan	12	(3)

International career^{‡}
2015	France U20	7	(4)
2015–2016	France U21	5	(1)
Medal record
Representing France
Winner	Toulon Tournament	2015
- * Club domestic league appearances and goals as of 15 June 2025 ‡ National team caps and goals as of 3 September 2016

Enzo Vito Gabriel Crivelli (born 6 February 1995) is a French professional footballer who plays as a forward.

Crivelli made his professional debut with Bordeaux in 2014, and went on to make over 50 appearances for the club over the course of the next two-and-a-half years. In August 2016, he joined Bastia on a season-long loan, before signing permanently for Angers the following year. Following a spell at Caen, Crivelli joined Turkish side İstanbul Başakşehir, where he also was sent on loan to Antalyaspor and Saint-Étienne. In 2022, he signed for Servette in Switzerland.

He is also a former youth international, and was the joint-top goalscorer at the 2015 Toulon Tournament in which France were crowned champions.

== Club career ==
=== Bordeaux ===
==== Early career ====
Born in Rouen, Crivelli progressed through the academy of Cannes, before joining Bordeaux in 2012. In his debut season for the club, he helped the U19 team to victory in the 2013 Coupe Gambardella. He then made his Ligue 1 debut on 26 January 2014 against Saint-Étienne, replacing Abdou Traoré after 83 minutes in a 2–0 home win. His second appearance came two months later, in a home game against Nice. Crivelli signed his first professional contract with Bordeaux in May 2015. Just days after signing the contract, he scored his first league goal for Les Girondins in a 1–1 draw with Lyon.

==== 2015–16 season ====
Crivelli scored his first Europa League goal for Bordeaux on 27 August 2015, in a 2–1 defeat to Kairat. It was a vital strike, as it gave Bordeaux an away goal, which helped them progress to the group stages of the competition. He followed his Europa League heroics by scoring his first goal of the 2015–16 Ligue 1 campaign in a 1–1 draw with Toulouse on 20 September. Three days later, in a clash against Nice, he set up Jaroslav Plašil for the opening goal, before being sent off in the 50th minute. Bordeaux went on to lose the match 6–1. In November, Crivelli added two more goals to his tally, scoring in a 2–2 draw with Rennes, before netting a late consolation goal in a 4–1 defeat to Caen. The strike against Caen was Crivelli's final goal for the season, as he failed to find the back of the net in the second half of the campaign, ultimately ending with a return of 3 goals in 29 league appearances.

==== 2016–17 season: Loan to Bastia ====
On 3 August 2016, Bordeaux simultaneously announced that Crivelli had signed a one-year extension on his contract with the club and that he would be spending the upcoming season on loan at fellow Ligue 1 side Bastia. He made his debut for the club on 12 August 2016, in a 1–0 loss to reigning Ligue 1 champions Paris Saint-Germain. Crivelli scored his first goals for the club the following week, netting a brace in a 3–0 win over Lorient. He also missed from the penalty spot during the match. On 24 September, Crivelli scored the only goal in a 1-0 win over Guingamp. Three minutes later, he was sent off for a second bookable offence and received a four-match ban from the LFP Disciplinary Committee, as a result. He ended the season with 10 goals in 24 appearances, though his return was not enough to prevent Bastia from being relegated to Ligue 2.

=== Angers ===
On 27 June 2017, Crivelli signed a four-year deal with fellow Ligue 1 side Angers. He scored on his debut for the club on 12 August, netting in a 2–0 Ligue 1 win over Amiens.

=== Caen ===
On 31 January 2018, Crivelli was loaned to Caen until the end of the season with an option to buy based on Caen's survival in Ligue 1.

On 9 June 2018, Caen activated the option to buy for around €3 million.

=== İstanbul Başakşehir ===
On 27 July 2019, Crivelli joined the Turkish club İstanbul Başakşehir.

On 31 January 2022, Crivelli signed for Ligue 1 side Saint-Étienne on loan until the end of the season. A purchase option was included in the deal.

== International career ==
In June 2015, Crivelli took part, and was victorious in the Toulon Tournament with the France national under-20 football team. He scored four goals during the tournament and was named joint-top goalscorer, alongside Morocco's Achraf Bencharki.

== Personal life ==
Crivelli was born in France, to an Algerian-born Pied-Noir father, and is of Italian and Algerian descent.

== Career statistics ==
As of match played 29 March 2025

Appearances and goals by club, season and competition
Club	Season	League			National cup (Note: Includes Coupe de France, Turkish Cup, Swiss Cup)		League cup (Note: Includes Coupe de la Ligue)		Europe		Other		Total	
Club	Season	Division	Apps	Goals	Apps	Goals	Apps	Goals	Apps	Goals	Apps	Goals	Apps	Goals
Bordeaux B	2013–14	CFA	17	3	—		—		—		—		17	3
Bordeaux B	2014–15	CFA	12	3	—		—		—		—		12	3
Bordeaux B	2015–16	CFA	1	0	—		—		—		—		1	0
Bordeaux B	Total		30	6	—		—		—		—		30	6
Bordeaux	2013–14	Ligue 1	2	0	1	0	0	0	—		—		3	0
Bordeaux	2014–15	Ligue 1	11	1	1	0	0	0	—		—		12	1
Bordeaux	2015–16	Ligue 1	29	3	2	2	2	0	8 (Note: Appearances in UEFA Europa League)	1	—		41	6
Bordeaux	Total		42	4	4	2	2	0	8	1	—		56	7
Bastia (loan)	2016–17	Ligue 1	24	10	0	0	0	0	—		—		24	10
Angers	2017–18	Ligue 1	15	1	0	0	2	0	—		—		17	1
Caen (loan)	2017–18	Ligue 1	11	2	3	0	0	0	—		—		14	2
Caen	2018–19	Ligue 1	33	6	1	0	1	0	—		—		35	6
İstanbul Başakşehir	2019–20	Süper Lig	30	11	3	0	—		11 (Note: Two appearances in UEFA Champions League, nine appearances and three goals in UEFA Europa League)	3	—		44	14
İstanbul Başakşehir	2020–21	Süper Lig	36	2	3	0	—		4 (Note: Appearances in UEFA Champions League)	0	1 (Note: Appearance in Turkish Super Cup)	0	44	2
İstanbul Başakşehir	2022–23	Süper Lig	1	0	0	0	—		3 (Note: Appearances in UEFA Europa Conference League)	0	—		4	0
İstanbul Başakşehir	Total		67	13	6	0	—		18	3	1	0	92	16
Antalyaspor (loan)	2021–22	Süper Lig	12	0	1	0	—		—		1	0	14	0
Saint-Étienne (loan)	2021–22	Ligue 1	4	0	0	0	—		—		2 (Note: Appearances in Ligue 1 relegation/promotion play-offs)	0	6	0
Servette	2022–23	Swiss Super League	19	4	3	3	—		0	0	—		22	7
Servette	2023–24	Swiss Super League	28	8	3	2	—		11 (Note: Three appearances in UEFA Champions League, four appearances and one goal in UEFA Europa League, four appearances in UEFA Europa Conference League)	1	—		42	11
Servette	2024–25	Swiss Super League	26	8	0	0	—		4 (Note: Two appearances in UEFA Europa League, two appearances and one goal in UEFA Conference League)	1	—		30	9
Servette	Total		74	20	6	5	—		15	2	—		94	27
Career total			311	62	21	7	5	0	41	6	4	0	382	75

== Honours ==
İstanbul Başakşehir

- Süper Lig: 2019–20

Servette

- Swiss Cup: 2023–24

France U20

- Toulon Tournament: 2015

Individual

- Toulon Tournament Top Scorer: 2015
