= Timothé Cognat =

French footballer (born 1998)

Personal information
- Full name: Timothé Cognat
- Date of birth: 25 January 1998 (age 28)
- Place of birth: Arnas, France
- Height: 1.73 m (5 ft 8 in)
- Position: Midfielder

Team information
- Current team: Servette
- Number: 8

Youth career
- 2004–2005: UF Belleville
- 2005–2011: Villefranche
- 2011–2015: Lyon

Senior career*
Years	Team	Apps	(Gls)
2015–2019	Lyon II	46	(9)
2018–2019	→ Servette (loan)	35	(2)
2019–	Servette	240	(18)

International career^{‡}
2013–2014	France U16	11	(2)
2014–2015	France U17	16	(4)
2015–2016	France U18	9	(1)
2016–2017	France U19	9	(1)
Medal record
Representing France
UEFA European Under-17 Championship
Winner	2015 Bulgaria
- * Club domestic league appearances and goals as of 28 September 2026 ‡ National team caps and goals as of 17 August 2019

Timothé Cognat (born 25 January 1998) is a French professional footballer who plays as a midfielder for the Swiss club Servette.

== Career ==
On 30 June 2019, Cognat permanently signed with Servette FC after a season on loan from Olympique Lyonnais.

== Career statistics ==
As of match played 6 April 2026

Club	Season	League			Cup		Europe		Total	
Club	Season	Division	Apps	Goals	Apps	Goals	Apps	Goals	Apps	Goals
Lyon II	2015–16	National 2	8	1	—		—		8	1
Lyon II	2016–17	National 2	17	4	—		—		17	4
Lyon II	2017–18	National 2	21	4	—		—		21	4
Lyon II	Total		46	9	—		—		46	9
Servette (loan)	2018–19	Swiss Challenge League	35	2	2	1	—		37	3
Servette	2019–20	Swiss Super League	32	2	0	0	—		32	2
Servette	2020–21	Swiss Super League	34	1	3	1	2 (Note: Appearances in UEFA Europa League)	0	39	2
Servette	2021–22	Swiss Super League	30	5	2	0	2 (Note: Appearances in UEFA Conference League)	0	34	5
Servette	2022–23	Swiss Super League	34	2	3	0	—		37	2
Servette	2023–24	Swiss Super League	38	4	6	2	14 (Note: Four appearances and one goal in UEFA Champions League, six appearances in UEFA Europa League, four appearances and one goal in UEFA Conference League)	2	58	8
Servette	2024–25	Swiss Super League	35	2	1	0	4 (Note: Two appearances in UEFA Europa League, two appearances in UEFA Conference League)	0	40	2
Servette	2025–26	Swiss Super League	30	2	1	0	6 (Note: Two appearances in UEFA Champions League, two appearances in UEFA Europa League, two appearances in UEFA Conference League)	0	37	2
Servette	Total		268	20	18	3	28	2	314	26
Career total			314	29	18	3	28	2	360	35

== Honours ==
Servette

- Swiss Cup: 2023–24

France U17

- UEFA European Under-17 Championship: 2015

Individual

- UEFA European Under-17 Championship Team of the Tournament: 2015
