= Mohamed Bangoura =

Mohamed Bangoura may refer to:

- Mohamed Bangoura (musician), Guinean drummer
- Mohamed Bangoura (footballer, born 1996) (born 1996), Guinean footballer
- Mohamed Bangoura (footballer, born 2004) (born 2004), Guinean footballer

== See also ==
- Mohamed Bangura (disambiguation)
