= Miroslav Stevanović =

Bosnian footballer (born 1990)

Personal information
- Date of birth: 29 July 1990 (age 36)
- Place of birth: Zvornik, SR Bosnia and Herzegovina, SFR Yugoslavia
- Height: 1.80 m (5 ft 11 in)
- Position: Winger

Team information
- Current team: Servette
- Number: 9

Youth career
- 2002–2008: Drina Zvornik
- 2008–2009: Vojvodina

Senior career*
Years	Team	Apps	(Gls)
2009–2013	Vojvodina	69	(12)
2009	→ Palić (loan)	13	(4)
2010	→ Borac Banja Luka (loan)	15	(2)
2013–2014	Sevilla	7	(0)
2013	→ Elche (loan)	3	(0)
2014	→ Alavés (loan)	13	(1)
2014–2015	Győr	3	(0)
2015–2016	Ergotelis	9	(0)
2016–2017	Željezničar	43	(5)
2017–	Servette	310	(78)

International career
2006–2007	Bosnia and Herzegovina U17	5	(0)
2008–2009	Bosnia and Herzegovina U19	10	(3)
2010–2012	Bosnia and Herzegovina U21	15	(5)
2012–2023	Bosnia and Herzegovina	33	(3)
- * Club domestic league appearances and goals as of 19 September 2026

Miroslav Stevanović (pronounced [mǐroslaʋ steʋâːnoʋitɕ]; born 29 July 1990) is a Bosnian professional footballer who plays as a winger for Swiss Super League club Servette.

Stevanović started his professional career at Vojvodina, who loaned him to Palić in 2009 and to Borac Banja Luka in 2010. In 2013, he was transferred to Sevilla, who sent him on loan to Elche later that year and to Alavés a year later. In 2014, he signed with Győr. The following year, Stevanović switched to Ergotelis. He joined Željezničar in 2016. A year after, he moved to Servette.

A former youth international for Bosnia and Herzegovina, Stevanović made his senior international debut in 2012, earning over 30 caps until 2023.

== Club career ==
=== Early career ===
Stevanović started playing football at his hometown club Drina Zvornik, before joining the youth academy of Serbian team Vojvodina in 2008. In July 2009, he was sent on six-month loan to Palić, with whom he made his professional debut and scored his first professional goal. In January 2010, he was loaned to Borac Banja Luka until the end of the season.

In January 2013, Stevanović was transferred to Spanish side Sevilla. In July, he was sent on a season-long loan to Elche. In January 2014, he was loaned to Alavés for the remainder of the campaign.

In December, Stevanović moved to Hungarian club Győr.

In September 2015, he joined Greek outfit Ergotelis.

In January 2016, he switched to Željezničar.

=== Servette ===
In July 2017, Stevanović signed a three-year deal with Swiss side Servette. He made his official debut for the team on 4 August against Rapperswil-Jona. On 10 September, he scored his first goal for Servette in a triumph over FC Schaffhausen.

In January 2019, he was named Swiss Challenge League Player of the Year.

Stevanović was instrumental in Servette's conquest of the Swiss Challenge League title, his first trophy with the club, which was sealed on 10 May and earned them promotion to the Swiss Super League. He had an impact of 11 goals and 14 assists.

In May, he extended his contract with the squad until June 2022.

He made his 100th appearance for the side against Basel on 19 July 2020.

In August 2021, he put pen to paper on a new four-year deal with Servette.

With 20 assists, Stevanović finished the 2021–22 season as the league's top assist provider, beating the previous record for most assists in a single campaign, 19, set by Stéphane Chapuisat.

He played his 200th game for the club on 2 March 2023 against FC Rotkreuz and managed to score a goal.

In December 2024, he prolonged his contract with Servette until the end of his career.

He appeared in his 300th match for the team against Young Boys on 11 May 2025.

== International career ==
Stevanović represented Bosnia and Herzegovina at all youth levels.

In May 2012, he received his first senior call up, for friendly games against the Republic of Ireland and Mexico. He debuted against the former on 26 May.

On 15 August, in a friendly match against Wales, Stevanović scored his first senior international goal.

He retired from international football on 17 May 2024.

== Career statistics ==
=== Club ===
As of match played 19 September 2026

Appearances and goals by club, season and competition
Club	Season	League			National cup (Note: Includes Bosnian Cup, Serbian Cup, Copa del Rey, Greek Cup, Swiss Cup)		Continental		Total	
Club	Season	Division	Apps	Goals	Apps	Goals	Apps	Goals	Apps	Goals
Palić (loan)	2009–10	Serbian League Vojvodina	13	4	–		–		13	4
Borac Banja Luka (loan)	2009–10	Bosnian Premier League	15	2	4	1	–		19	3
Vojvodina	2010–11	Serbian SuperLiga	24	4	3	0	–		27	4
Vojvodina	2011–12	Serbian SuperLiga	30	6	5	0	2 (Note: Appearances in UEFA Europa League)	0	37	6
Vojvodina	2012–13	Serbian SuperLiga	15	2	2	0	4	1	21	3
Vojvodina	Total		69	12	10	0	6	1	85	13
Sevilla	2012–13	La Liga	7	0	3	0	–		10	0
Elche (loan)	2013–14	La Liga	3	0	0	0	–		3	0
Alavés (loan)	2013–14	Segunda División	13	1	–		–		13	1
Győr	2014–15	Nemzeti Bajnokság I	3	0	–		–		3	0
Ergotelis	2015–16	Super League Greece 2	9	0	2	0	–		11	0
Željezničar	2015–16	Bosnian Premier League	12	3	4	1	–		16	4
Željezničar	2016–17	Bosnian Premier League	31	2	6	0	–		37	2
Željezničar	Total		43	5	10	1	–		53	6
Servette	2017–18	Swiss Challenge League	31	8	1	0	–		32	8
Servette	2018–19	Swiss Challenge League	34	11	2	0	–		36	11
Servette	2019–20	Swiss Super League	34	8	2	0	–		36	8
Servette	2020–21	Swiss Super League	28	5	3	1	2	1	33	7
Servette	2021–22	Swiss Super League	34	4	3	1	2 (Note: Appearances in UEFA Conference League)	0	39	5
Servette	2022–23	Swiss Super League	35	9	3	2	–		38	11
Servette	2023–24	Swiss Super League	30	4	6	1	11 (Note: One appearance in UEFA Champions League; six appearances in UEFA Europa League; four appearances in UEFA Conference League)	0	47	5
Servette	2024–25	Swiss Super League	38	14	1	0	3 (Note: One appearance in UEFA Europa League; two appearances in UEFA Conference League)	0	42	14
Servette	2025–26	Swiss Super League	37	14	2	1	6 (Note: Two appearances in UEFA Champions League; two appearances in UEFA Europa League; two appearances in UEFA Conference League)	0	45	15
Servette	2026–27	Swiss Super League	9	1	1	0	–		10	1
Servette	Total		310	78	24	6	24	1	358	85
Career total			485	102	53	8	30	2	568	112

=== International ===
Appearances and goals by national team and year
National team	Year	Apps	Goals
Bosnia and Herzegovina
Bosnia and Herzegovina	2012	5	1
Bosnia and Herzegovina	2013	5	0
Bosnia and Herzegovina	2014	0	0
Bosnia and Herzegovina	2015	0	0
Bosnia and Herzegovina	2016	2	0
Bosnia and Herzegovina	2017	1	0
Bosnia and Herzegovina	2018	0	0
Bosnia and Herzegovina	2019	0	0
Bosnia and Herzegovina	2020	0	0
Bosnia and Herzegovina	2021	8	1
Bosnia and Herzegovina	2022	6	0
Bosnia and Herzegovina	2023	6	1
Total		33	3

Scores and results list Bosnia and Herzegovina's goal tally first, score column indicates score after each Stevanović goal.

List of international goals scored by Miroslav Stevanović
No.	Date	Venue	Cap	Opponent	Score	Result	Competition
1	15 August 2012	Parc y Scarlets, Llanelli, Wales	2	Wales	2–0	2–0	Friendly
2	24 March 2021	Helsinki Olympic Stadium, Helsinki, Finland	14	Finland	2–2	2–2	2022 FIFA World Cup qualification
3	13 October 2023	Rheinpark Stadion, Vaduz, Liechtenstein	31	Liechtenstein	2–0	2–0	UEFA Euro 2024 qualifying

== Honours ==
Borac Banja Luka

- Bosnian Cup: 2009–10

Servette

- Swiss Challenge League: 2018–19
- Swiss Cup: 2023–24

Individual

- Bosnian Premier League Player of the Season: 2016–17
- Swiss Challenge League Player of the Year: 2018
- Swiss Super League top assist provider: 2021–22
