= Dereck Kutesa =

Swiss footballer (born 1997)

Personal information
- Full name: Dereck Germano Kutesa
- Date of birth: 6 December 1997 (age 28)
- Place of birth: Geneva, Switzerland
- Height: 1.77 m (5 ft 10 in)
- Position: Winger

Team information
- Current team: AEK Athens
- Number: 7

Youth career
- –2013: Servette

Senior career*
Years	Team	Apps	(Gls)
2013–2016	Servette	19	(0)
2016–2018	Basel	4	(0)
2016	→ Servette (loan)	0	(0)
2017–2018	→ Luzern (loan)	11	(1)
2018–2019	St. Gallen	39	(4)
2019–2022	Reims	42	(2)
2021–2022	→ Zulte Waregem (loan)	29	(3)
2022	Reims II	1	(0)
2022–2025	Servette	102	(22)
2025–	AEK Athens	19	(0)

International career^{‡}
2012	Switzerland U15	3	(0)
2012–2013	Switzerland U16	6	(1)
2013–2014	Switzerland U17	12	(0)
2014	Switzerland U18	1	(0)
2015	Switzerland U19	5	(0)
2016–2017	Switzerland U20	9	(1)
2018	Switzerland U21	3	(0)
2024–	Switzerland	3	(0)
- * Club domestic league appearances and goals as of 20 September 2026 ‡ National team caps and goals as of 18 November 2024

Dereck Germano Kutesa (born 6 December 1997) is a Swiss professional footballer who plays as a winger for Super League Greece club AEK Athens and the Switzerland national team.

== Club career ==
Kutesa played his youth football by Servette and advanced through all the ranks. On 18 October 2013 he signed his first professional contract, a three-year deal, but he remained with their U-21 team. During the 2014–15 season he was called up to their first team and had four appearances with them in the Challenge League, the second tier of Swiss football. At the end of the season Servette were second in the table, but they did not obtain a license for the 2015-16 Challenge League season because they did not provide necessary financial documents and guarantees. Servette was therefore relegated to the Promotion League, the third tier.

On 30 December 2015 Kutesa signed for Basel on a three-and-a-half-year contract. He prepared himself for the second half of the season in January with Basel and was loaned back to his regular club Servette until the end of the season. With Kutesa's help they achieved immediate promotion.

On 1 July 2016 Kutesa joined Basel's first team for their 2016–17 season under head coach Urs Fischer. After playing in five test games Kutesa played his debut for the club in the Swiss Cup away game in the Herti Allmend Stadion on 18 September 2016 as Basel won 1–0 against Zug 94. He played his domestic league debut for the club in the away game in the Rheinpark Stadion on 5 March 2017 as Basel played a 1–1 draw with Vaduz. Under trainer Urs Fischer Kutesa won the Swiss Super League championship at the end of the 2016–17 season. For the club this was the eighth title in a row and their 20th championship title in total. They also won the Swiss Cup for the twelfth time, which meant they had won the double for the sixth time in the club's history. Kutesa played in two of the cup games.

On 14 September 2017, Basel announced that they were loaning out Kutesa to FC Luzern, until the end of the 2017–18 Swiss Super League season, so that he could gain more first team playing experience. Following this loan period he returned to Basel. But on 5 July 2018 he transferred to St. Gallen. During his short period with the club, Kutesa played a total of nine games for Basel without scoring a goal. Four of these games were in the Swiss Super League, three in the Swiss Cup and nine were friendly games.

During summer 2018, on 5 July, Kutesa transferred to St. Gallen, where he stayed for just one season, in which he played a total of 45 competitive games for FCSG. In these he scored five goals and made five assists. On 27 August 2019 the club announced that he was transferring to French team Stade de Reims in the Ligue 1.

On 25 August 2021, he joined Zulte Waregem in Belgium for a season-long loan.

On 30 August 2022, Kutesa returned to Servette and signed a three-year contract.

=== AEK Athens ===
On 12 May 2025, it was rumoured that Kutesa had agreen to join AEK Athens on a free transfer. Ten days later, the club officially announced the signing of Kutesa on a three-year contract.

== International career ==
Kutesa is of Angolan descent. He participated in the 2014 UEFA European Under-17 Championship with the Switzerland national under-17 football team.

He made his debut for the senior Switzerland national team on 26 March 2024 in a friendly against the Republic of Ireland.

He is also eligible to represent Angola.

== Career statistics ==
=== Club ===
As of match played 24 October 2025

Appearances and goals by club, season and competition
Club	Season	League			National cup (Note: Includes Swiss Cup, Coupe de France, Belgian Cup, Greek Football Cup)		League cup (Note: Includes Coupe de la Ligue)		Europe		Total	
Club	Season	Division	Apps	Goals	Apps	Goals	Apps	Goals	Apps	Goals	Apps	Goals
Servette	2014–15	Swiss Challenge League	4	0	0	0	—		—		4	0
Servette	2015–16	Swiss Super League	15	0	1	0	—		–		16	0
Servette	Total		19	0	1	0	—		—		20	0
Basel	2016–17	Swiss Super League	3	0	2	0	—		—		5	0
Basel	2017–18	Swiss Super League	1	0	1	0	—		–		2	0
Basel	Total		4	0	3	0	—		—		7	0
Luzern (loan)	2017–18	Swiss Super League	11	1	3	0	—		—		14	1
FC St. Gallen	2018–19	Swiss Super League	35	4	3	0	—		2 (Note: Appearances in UEFA Europa League)	0	40	4
FC St. Gallen	2019–20	Swiss Super League	4	0	1	1	—		–		5	1
FC St. Gallen	Total		39	4	4	1	—		2	0	45	5
Reims	2019–20	Ligue 1	14	1	1	0	2	1	—		17	2
Reims	2020–21	Ligue 1	28	1	1	0	—		2	0	31	1
Reims	Total		42	2	2	0	2	1	2	0	48	3
Zulte Waregem (loan)	2021–22	Belgian Pro League	29	3	2	1	—		—		31	4
Servette	2022–23	Swiss Super League	29	3	4	2	—		—		33	5
Servette	2023–24	Swiss Super League	36	4	5	1	—		14 (Note: Four appearances and one goal in UEFA Champions League, six appearances in UEFA Europa League, four appearances in UEFA Conference League)	1	55	6
Servette	2024–25	Swiss Super League	37	15	2	1	—		4 (Note: Two appearances in UEFA Europa League, two appearances and one goal in UEFA Conference League)	1	43	17
Servette	Total		102	22	11	4	—		18	2	131	28
AEK Athens	2025–26	Super League Greece	7	0	1	0	—		8 (Note: Appearances in UEFA Conference League)	4	16	4
Career total			253	32	27	6	2	1	30	6	311	45

=== International ===
As of match played 18 November 2024

Appearances and goals by national team and year
National team	Year	Apps	Goals
Switzerland	2024	3	0
Total		3	0

== Honours ==
Basel

- Swiss Super League: 2016–17
- Swiss Cup: 2016–17

Servette

- Swiss Cup: 2023–24

AEK Athens

- Super League Greece: 2025–26
