= Mohamed Bangura (disambiguation) =

Mohamed Bangura (born 1989) is a Sierra Leonean footballer.

Mohamed Bangura may also refer to:

- Mohamed Bangura (boxer) (born 1959), Sierra Leonean former Olympic boxer
- Mohamed Bangura, Sierra Leonean journalist abducted in 1996
- Mohamed Bangura, Sierra Leonean Minister of Information in 1998 under the Armed Forces Revolutionary Council

== See also ==
- Mohamed Bangoura (disambiguation)
