= Tiemoko Ouattara =

Swiss footballer (born 2005)

Personal information
- Date of birth: 25 May 2005 (age 21)
- Place of birth: Geneva, Switzerland
- Height: 1.78 m (5 ft 10 in)
- Position: Winger

Team information
- Current team: Servette
- Number: 77

Youth career
- 2013–2019: FC Vernier
- 2019–2022: Servette

Senior career*
Years	Team	Apps	(Gls)
2022–	Servette II	55	(18)
2023–	Servette	30	(2)
2025–2026	→ St. Gallen (loan)	13	(0)

International career^{‡}
2022–2023	Switzerland U18	6	(0)
2023–2024	Switzerland U19	8	(1)
2024–2026	Switzerland U20	6	(0)
2025	Switzerland U21	2	(1)
- * Club domestic league appearances and goals as of 8 August 2026 ‡ National team caps and goals as of 31 March 2026

Tiemoko Ouattara (born 25 May 2005) is a Swiss professional footballer who plays as a winger for Swiss Super League club Servette.

== Club career ==
Ouattara is a youth product of FC Vernier and moved to the youth academy of Servette in 2019. On 30 September 2022, Ouattara signed his first professional contract with Servette until 2025. On 16 September 2023, he made his debut with the senior Servette team in a 4–1 Swiss Cup win over FC Bulle. On 19 September 2023 he extended his contract until 2027. On 28 May 2025, he again extended his contract with the club until 2029.

== International career ==
Born in Switzerland, Ouattara is of Ivorian descent and holds dual Swiss-Ivorian citizenship. He is a youth international for Switzerland, having been called up to the Switzerland U21s in 2025.

== Honours ==
Servette

- Swiss Cup: 2023–24
