= Baba Souare =

Swiss footballer (born 1999)

Personal information
- Full name: Baba Oulen Souare
- Date of birth: 7 March 1999 (age 27)
- Place of birth: Genève, Switzerland
- Height: 1.93 m (6 ft 4 in)
- Position: Centre-back

Team information
- Current team: Vevey-Sports
- Number: 4

Youth career
- 2015–2017: Servette

Senior career*
Years	Team	Apps	(Gls)
2017–2019	Servette	11	(0)
2017–2019	Servette U21	4	(1)
2019–2022	Grasshopper	10	(0)
2019–2022	Grasshopper U21	30	(2)
2020–2021	→ Kriens (loan)	11	(0)
2022–2024	Servette	2	(0)
2022–2024	Servette U21	15	(3)
2024	Næstved	3	(0)
2024	Châteaubriant	1	(0)
2024–	Vevey-Sports	4	(0)

International career
2016	Switzerland U17	2	(0)
2016-2017	Switzerland U18	3	(0)
2018	Switzerland U19	2	(0)
2019	Switzerland U20	1	(0)
- * Club domestic league appearances and goals as of 22 June 2025

Baba Oulen Souare (born 7 March 1999) is a Swiss professional footballer who plays as a defender for Swiss Promotion League club Vevey-Sports.

== Club career ==
=== Early years ===
Born in Genève, Switzerland, Souare started his career in the youth sector at Servette.

=== Servette ===
Souare began his senior career in Switzerland with Servette.

=== Grasshoppers ===
He transferred to Grasshopper Club Zurich on 29 March 2019.

=== Loan to Kriens ===
Souare was loaned to Kriens for one year by Grasshoppers on 24 August 2020.

=== Return to Servette ===
Souare signed a three-year contract with Servette on 20 July 2022. Souare left Servette by mutual consent on 30 January 2024.

=== Næstved ===
On 31 January 2024, Souare joined Danish 1st Division club Næstved Boldklub. He left Næstved at the end of the season, which ended with relegation to the 2024-25 Danish 2nd Division.

== International career ==
Born in Switzerland, Souare is of Senegalese descent. He has been capped at youth level for Switzerland.

== Career statistics ==
As of match played 9 November 2022

Appearances and goals by club, season and competition
Club	Season	League			Cup		Europe		Other		Total	
Club	Season	Division	Apps	Goals	Apps	Goals	Apps	Goals	Apps	Goals	Apps	Goals
Servette	2017–18	Swiss Challenge League	9	0	0	0	—		—		9	0
Servette	2018–19	Swiss Challenge League	2	0	1	0	0	0	—		3	0
Servette	Total		11	0	1	0	0	0	0	0	12	0
Grasshopper	2018–19	Swiss Challenge League	0	0	0	0	—		—		0	0
Grasshopper	2019–20	Swiss Challenge League	10	0	2	0	0	0	—		12	0
Grasshopper	2021–22	Swiss Super League	0	0	0	0	—		—		0	0
Grasshopper	Total		10	0	2	0	0	0	0	0	12	0
Kriens (loan)	2020–21	Swiss Challenge League	11	0	1	0	—		—		12	0
Servette	2022–23	Swiss Super League	1	0	1	0	—		—		2	0
Career total			33	0	5	0	0	0	0	0	38	0
