= Malik Sawadogo =

Swiss footballer (born 2003)

Personal information
- Date of birth: 12 July 2003 (age 23)
- Place of birth: Geneva, Switzerland
- Height: 1.72 m (5 ft 8 in)
- Position: Left-back

Team information
- Current team: Vaduz
- Number: 29

Youth career
- 2011: CS Interstar
- 2011–2021: Servette

Senior career*
| Years | Team | Apps | (Gls) |
| 2021–2025 | Servette | 3 | (0) |
| 2021–2025 | Servette U21 | 27 | (0) |
| 2023–2024 | → Nyon (loan) | 34 | (0) |
| 2025 | → Nyon (loan) | 15 | (1) |
| 2025– | Vaduz | 16 | (0) |

International career^{‡}
| 2021 | Switzerland U19 | 8 | (0) |
| 2023 | Switzerland U20 | 2 | (0) |
- * Club domestic league appearances and goals as of 28 September 2026 ‡ National team caps and goals as of 28 March 2023

Malik Sawadogo (born 12 July 2003) is a Swiss professional footballer who plays as a left-back for Liechtensteiner Swiss Super League club Vaduz.

== Career ==
A youth product of CS Interstar and Servette, Sawadogo signed his first professional contract with Servette on 24 February 2021. He made his professional debut with Servette in a 2–1 Swiss Super League win over Young Boys on 4 December 2021.

== International career ==
Born in Switzerland, Sawadogo is of Burkinabé descent. He is a youth international for Switzerland, having represented the Switzerland U19s.
