= Mohamed Bangoura (footballer, born 2004) =

Guinean footballer (born 2004)

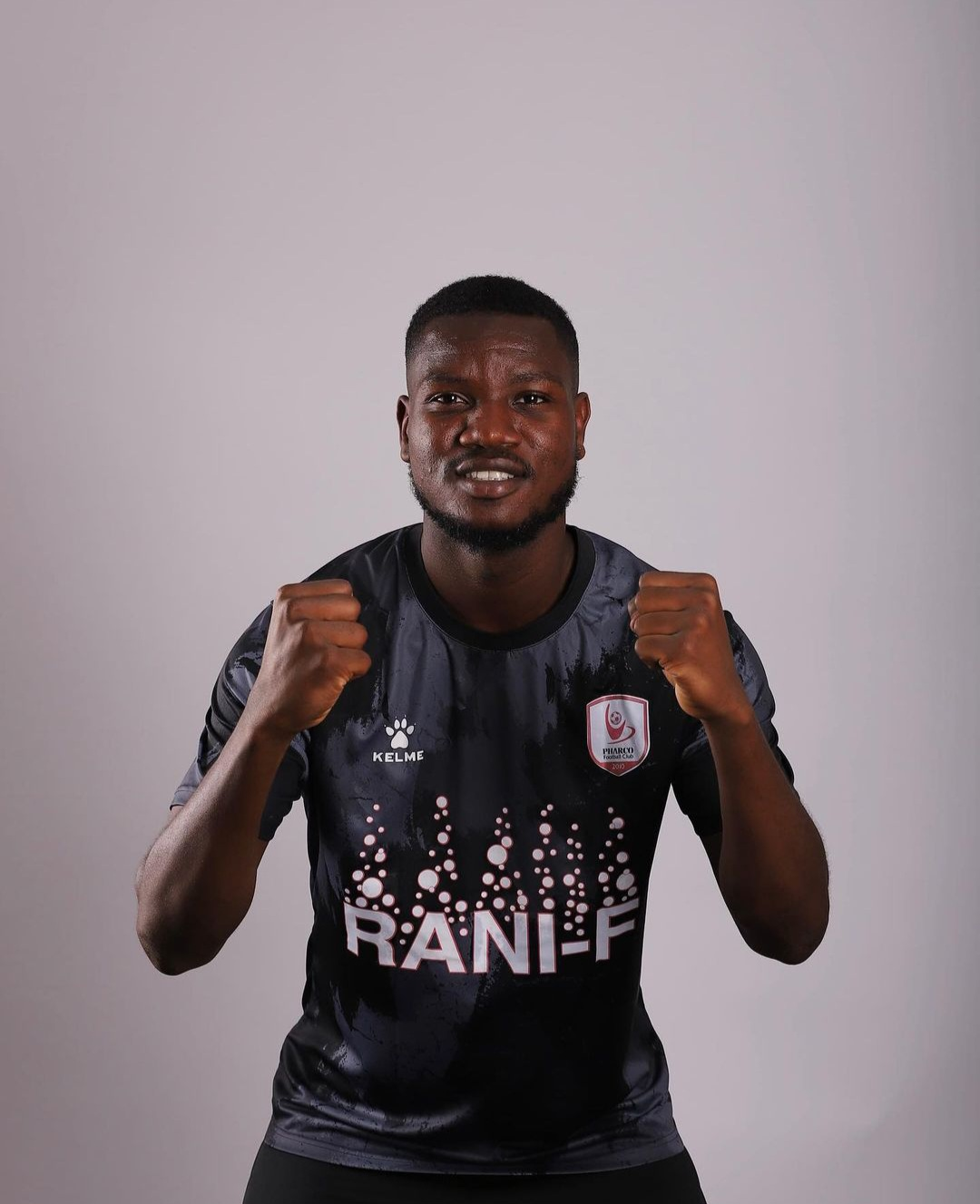
- Bangoura in 2023

Personal information
- Date of birth: 5 October 2004 (age 22)
- Place of birth: Guinea
- Height: 1.82 m (6 ft 0 in)
- Position: Forward

Team information
- Current team: Panazol

Youth career
- –2019: Académie sport de Guinée
- 2019–2020: Thonon Evian
- 2020–2021: Béziers
- 2021–2023: Troyes

Senior career*
Years	Team	Apps	(Gls)
2021–2023	Troyes B	11	(3)
2023–2024	Pharco	3	(0)
2024–	Panazol	0	(0)
- * Club domestic league appearances and goals as of 3 July 2024

Mohamed Bangoura (born 5 October 2004) is a Guinean professional footballer who plays as a forward for French Championnat National 3 club Panazol.

== Career ==
On 13 August 2023, Bangoura signed for Egyptian Premier League club Pharco.
