= Valton Behrami =

Swiss footballer (born 2003)

Personal information
- Date of birth: 16 March 2004 (age 22)
- Place of birth: Geneva, Switzerland
- Height: 1.82 m (6 ft 0 in)
- Position: Left-back

Team information
- Current team: Bulle
- Number: 13

Youth career
- FC Onex
- Meyrin
- Étoile Carouge
- 2017–2022: Servette

Senior career*
Years	Team	Apps	(Gls)
2022–2025	Servette U21	26	(0)
2022–2025	Servette	5	(0)
2023	→ Bellinzona (loan)	9	(0)
2024–2025	→ Delémont (loan)	26	(2)
2025–	Bulle	27	(1)

International career^{‡}
2022	Switzerland U19	2	(0)
2023–	Kosovo U21	3	(0)
- * Club domestic league appearances and goals as of 26 June 2026 ‡ National team caps and goals as of 22 March 2024

Valton Behrami (born 16 March 2004) is a professional footballer who plays as a midfielder for Swiss Promotion League club Bulle. Born in Switzerland, he represented it internationally on junior level before switching allegiance to Kosovo.

== Career ==
Behrami is a youth product of FC Onex, Meyrin and Étoile Carouge, before moving to Servette as a U15 to finish his development. He made his senior and professional debut with Servette in a 2–1 Swiss Super League win over Sion on 20 March 2022. On 1 November 2022, he signed a professional contract with the club until 2025. On 7 March 2023, he was loaned to the Swiss Challenge League club Bellinzona for the second half of the 2022–23 season.

== International career ==
Born in Switzerland, Behrami is of Kosovan descent. He is a former youth international for Switzerland, having played for the Switzerland U19s.

In November 2023, Behrami debuted for the Kosovo U21 squad.

== Playing style ==
Behrami is a full-back who played as striker and centre-back as a youth. He can also slot in as a winger), and can contribute offensively with goals.
