= Théo Magnin =

Swiss footballer (born 2003)

Personal information
- Date of birth: 9 August 2003 (age 23)
- Place of birth: Geneva, Switzerland
- Height: 1.71 m (5 ft 7 in)
- Position: Right-back

Team information
- Current team: Red Star
- Number: 2

Youth career
- 2012–2017: FC Etoile Laconnex
- 2017–2021: Servette

Senior career*
Years	Team	Apps	(Gls)
2021–2023	Servette U21	29	(2)
2022–2026	Servette	61	(0)
2026–	Red Star	10	(0)

International career^{‡}
2017–2018	Switzerland U19	7	(0)
2018–2019	Switzerland U19	5	(0)
2021	Switzerland U19	6	(0)
2022–2023	Switzerland U20	2	(0)
2024	Switzerland U21	2	(0)
- * Club domestic league appearances and goals as of 11 May 2026 ‡ National team caps and goals as of 10 September 2024

Théo Magnin (born 9 August 2003) is a Swiss professional footballer who plays as a right-back for French Ligue 2 club Red Star.

== Club career ==
A youth product of FC Etoile Laconnex, Magnin moved to the youth academy of Servette in 2017 and worked his way up their youth categories. He signed his first professional contract with the club on 23 February 2021. He made his senior and professional debut with Servette in a 1–1 Swiss Super League tie with FC Basel on 24 July 2022. On 6 April 2023, he extended his professional contract until 2026.

On 1 February 2026, Magnin signed with Red Star in French Ligue 2.

== International career ==
Magnin is a youth international for Switzerland, having played up to the Switzerland U21s.

== Honours ==
Servette FC

- Swiss Cup: 2023–24
