= Steve Rouiller =

Swiss footballer (born 1990)

Personal information
- Full name: Steve Rouiller
- Date of birth: 10 July 1990 (age 36)
- Place of birth: Monthey, Switzerland
- Height: 1.83 m (6 ft 0 in)
- Position: Defender

Team information
- Current team: Servette
- Number: 4

Senior career*
Years	Team	Apps	(Gls)
2010–2011	Sion	0	(0)
2011–2014	Monthey	62	(7)
2014–2015	Sion	6	(0)
2014–2016	Chiasso	51	(2)
2016–2018	Lugano	39	(2)
2018–	Servette	251	(20)
- * Club domestic league appearances and goals as of 28 September 2026

Steve Rouiller (born 10 July 1990) is a Swiss professional footballer who plays as a defender for Swiss Super League club Servette FC.

== Club career ==
=== FC Sion ===
Rouiller started his senior career with FC Sion in the Swiss Super League. He made his league debut for the club on 25 October 2014 in a 1-1 away draw with Basel.

=== Monthey ===
In July 2011, Rouiller moved to FC Monthey in the Swiss 1. Liga. He spent three years with the club, racking up over sixty league appearances and scoring seven goals.

=== Chiasso ===
In February 2016, Rouiller moved to Chiasso on a year-and-a-half deal. He made his league debut for the club on 28 March 2015 in a 2-0 home defeat to Biel-Bienne. He scored his first competitive goal for the club on 19 October 2015 in a 1-1 away draw, also with Biel-Benne. His goal, scored in the 15th minute, made the score 1-0 to Chiasso.

=== Lugano ===
In August 2016, Rouiller moved to FC Lugano on a one-year contract with an option to extend for another year. He made his league debut for the club on 16 October 2016 in a 0-0 home draw with BSC Young Boys. He scored his first league goal for the club on 9 August 2017 in a 3-2 away victory over Lausanne. His goal, scored in the 53rd minute, made the score 2-1 to Lugano.

=== Servette ===
In June 2018, Rouiller joined Challenge League club Servette. He made his league debut for the club on 21 July 2018 in a 2-0 away victory over Aarau.

== Honours ==
Servette FC

- Swiss Cup: 2023–24
