= 2023–24 Swiss Cup =

Tournament details
- Country: Switzerland
- Date: 18 August 2023 – 2 June 2024
- Teams: 64

Final positions
- Champions: Servette (8th title)
- Runners-up: Lugano

Tournament statistics
- Matches played: 63
- Top goal scorer(s): Žan Celar (6 goals)

The 2023–24 Swiss Cup, or Schweizer Pokal, was the 99th season of Switzerland's annual football cup competition. It featured 64 teams from the first to the eight tier of the Swiss football league. The first round was played from 18 to 20 August 2023. The final took place on 2 June 2024.

Young Boys were the reigning Cup champion, but lost in the quarter-finals to FC Sion. As the winners, Servette qualified for the third qualifying round of the 2024–25 UEFA Europa League.

== Participating teams ==
64 teams participate in the Swiss Cup. They come from across the three levels of the Swiss football pyramid:

- The 21 eligible members of the Swiss Football League are automatically entered
  - Twelve from the Super League
  - Nine teams from the Challenge League (Note: Liechtenstein club and Challenge League member FC Vaduz is not eligible to participate in the Swiss Cup. This spot is awarded to the Promotion League)
- 17 teams can qualify from the First League (Promotion League and 1. Liga)
  - Seven top ranked eligible teams of 2022-23 Swiss Promotion League (U21 squads of SFL teams are not eligible)
  - Ten teams from the 1. Liga
- 25 teams can qualify from the Amateur League
  - Nine teams from the 2. Liga Interregional
  - 16 teams from the 13 regional football associations (regional associations of Bern-Jura, Zürich and Eastern Switzerland (Note: Includes the Cantons of St. Gallen, Thurgau, Appenzell Innerrhoden, Appenzell Ausserrhoden, Glarus, and Grisons.) have two participants)
- Final spot is awarded to the winner of the Suva Fairplay Trophy, awarded to the fairest football club of the last season

Super League; 12 teams	Challenge League; 9 teams	Promotion League; 7 teams	1. Liga; 13 teams	2. Liga Interregional; 7 teams	2. Liga; 12 teams	3. Liga; 4 teams
FC Basel; Grasshopper Club Zürich; FC Lausanne-Sport; FC Stade Lausanne-Ouchy; FC Lugano; FC Luzern; Servette FC; FC St. Gallen; FC Winterthur; BSC Young Boys; Yverdon-Sport FC; FC Zürich	FC Aarau; FC Baden; AC Bellinzona; FC Schaffhausen; FC Sion; FC Thun; FC Wil 1900; Neuchâtel Xamax FCS; FC Stade Nyonnais	FC Bulle; FC Breitenrain; SC Brühl; SC Cham; Étoile Carouge FC; SC Kriens; FC Rapperswil-Jona	FC La Chaux-de-Fonds; SR Delémont; FC Courtételle; FC Black Stars; SV Höngg; FC Wettswil-Bonstetten; FC Dietikon; Vevey-Sports; Meyrin FC; FC Grand-Saconnex; FC Mendrisio; FC Tuggen; AC Taverne	FC Ajoie-Monterri; FC Bosporus; FC Collina d'Oro; Lancy FC; FC Red Star; SV Schaffhausen; FC Widnau	FC Porrentruy; FC Iliria; FC Saint-Blaise; FC Schönenwerd-Niedergösgen; FC Greifensee; FC Savièse; FC Genolier-Begnins; FC Onex; FC Haute-Gruyère; AC Malcantone; FC Winkeln; FC Buchs	VfR Kleinhünigen; FC Frutigen (Note: FC Frutigen qualifies as the second fairest team in Switzerland. Winner of the Suva Fairplay Trophy, FC Lausanne-Sport is already qualified.); FC Affoltern a/A; FC Gunzwil

== Schedule and venues ==
The table below shows the schedule of the competition. The competitor of the lower league (Note: League is indicated in brackets: (SL): Swiss Super League (ChL): Swiss Challenge League (PL): Swiss Promotion League (1): 1. Liga (2Int): 2. Liga Interregional (2): 2. Liga (3): 3. Liga) has home ground advantage in all rounds except the final, if applicable. The final will be held at Stadion Wankdorf, Bern.

Matchup restrictions apply in the first two rounds:

- In Round 1, clubs of the Swiss Football League (SL and ChL) cannot be drawn against each other. Furthermore, matchups are regionally drawn.
- In Round 2, teams of the Swiss Super League cannot be drawn against each other.
- From Round 3 onwards, no more matchup restrictions apply.

Round	Match date
Round 1 (round of 64)	18–20 August 2023
Round 2 (round of 32)	15–17 September 2023
Round 3 (round of 16)	31 October – 2 November 2023
Round 4 (quarter-finals)	27–29 February 2024
Round 5 (semi-finals)	27–28 April 2024
Round 6 (final)	2 June 2024

== Results ==
=== First round ===
Matchups for the first round were drawn on 3 July 2023 and will be played between 18 and 20 August 2023. Representatives of the Swiss Football League (SL and ChL) could not be drawn against each other. Furthermore, in the first round, the matchups are regionally restricted. Teams' leagues are indicated in brackets.

Team 1	Score	Team 2
FC Ajoie-Monterri (2Int) (Canton of Jura)	0–3	(Canton of Jura) SR Delémont (1)
FC Breitenrain (PL) (Canton of Bern)	0–5	(Canton of Bern) BSC Young Boys (SL)
Lancy FC (2Int) (Canton of Geneva)	2–1	(Vaud) FC Stade Nyonnais (ChL)
Etoile Carouge FC (PL) (Canton of Geneva)	1–3	(Valais) FC Sion (ChL)
FC Genolier-Begnins (2) (Vaud)	0–1 (a.e.t.)	(Canton of Geneva) FC Onex (2)
SV Höngg (1) (Canton of Zurich)	1–3	(Canton of St. Gallen) FC Rapperswil-Jona (PL)
FC Affoltern a/A (3) (Canton of Zurich)	0–4	(Aargau) FC Baden (ChL)
FC Wettswil-Bonstetten (1) (Canton of Zurich)	0–2	(Canton of Zurich) FC Winterthur (SL)
FC Grand-Saconnex (1) (Canton of Geneva)	0–4	(Vaud) FC Stade Lausanne Ouchy (SL)
FC Buchs (2) (Canton of St. Gallen)	0–4	(Ticino) AC Bellinzona (ChL)
FC Dietikon (1) (Canton of Zurich)	0–1	(Aargau) FC Aarau (ChL)
FC Haute-Gruyère (2) (Canton of Fribourg)	0–9	(Vaud) Yverdon-Sport FC (ChL)
FC Courtételle (1) (Canton of Jura)	0–2	(Basel-Stadt) FC Black Stars (1)
FC Schönenwerd-Niedergösgen (2) (Canton of Solothurn)	0–2	(Canton of Zurich) FC Greifensee (2)
FC Porrentruy (2) (Canton of Jura)	0–2	(Canton of Bern) FC Bosporus (2Int)
FC Frutigen (3) (Canton of Bern)	0–5	(Canton of Bern) FC Thun (ChL)
FC Red Star Zürich (2Int) (Canton of Zurich)	0–2	(Canton of Zurich) FC Zürich (SL)
Meyrin FC (1) (Canton of Geneva)	0–8	(Canton of Geneva) Servette FC (SL)
FC Mendrisio (1) (Ticino)	1–3	(Canton of Lucerne) SC Kriens (PL)
AC Malcantone (2) (Ticino)	1–2	(Canton of Schwyz) FC Tuggen (1)
FC Gunzwil (3) (Canton of Lucerne)	0–7	(Ticino) FC Lugano (SL)
AC Taverne (1) (Ticino)	0–3	(Canton of St. Gallen) SC Brühl (PL)
FC Iliria (2) (Canton of Solothurn)	0–2	(Canton of Neuchâtel) FC La Chaux-de-Fonds (1)
Vevey-Sports (1) (Vaud)	0–3	(Vaud) FC Lausanne-Sport (SL)
VfR Kleinhünigen (3) (Basel-Stadt)	0–8	(Canton of Neuchâtel) Neuchâtel Xamax FCS (ChL)
FC Saint-Blaise (2) (Canton of Neuchâtel)	1–8	(Basel-Stadt) FC Basel (SL)
SC Cham (PL) (Canton of Zug)	1–3	(Canton of Schaffhausen) FC Schaffhausen (ChL)
FC Savièse (2) (Valais)	0–5	(Canton of Fribourg) FC Bulle (PL)
FC Winkeln (2) (Canton of St. Gallen)	0–6	(Canton of Lucerne) FC Luzern (SL)
FC Widnau (2Int) (Canton of St. Gallen)	1–2	(Canton of St. Gallen) FC St. Gallen (SL)
SV Schaffhausen (2Int) (Canton of Schaffhausen)	0–4	(Canton of Zurich) Grasshopper Club Zürich (SL)
FC Collina d'Oro (2Int) (Ticino)	0–4	(Canton of St. Gallen) FC Wil (ChL)

=== Second round ===
Following the conclusion of the first round, the matchups for the second round were drawn. Teams of the Swiss Super League cannot be drawn against each other.

Team 1	Score	Team 2
FC Wil (ChL) (Canton of St. Gallen)	1–1; 3–4 (p)	(Vaud) FC Stade Lausanne Ouchy (SL)
Neuchâtel Xamax FCS (ChL) (Canton of Neuchâtel)	0–1	(Canton of Bern) BSC Young Boys (SL)
FC Sion (ChL) (Valais)	3–0	(Canton of Zurich) Grasshopper Club Zürich (SL)
Lancy FC (2Int) (Canton of Geneva)	0–3	(Ticino) FC Lugano (SL)
FC Rapperswil-Jona (PL) (Canton of St. Gallen)	1–0	(Vaud) Yverdon-Sport FC (ChL)
FC Black Stars (1) (Basel-Stadt)	4–1	(Canton of Neuchâtel) FC La Chaux-de-Fonds (1)
SC Kriens (PL) (Canton of Lucerne)	4–0	(Aargau) FC Baden (ChL)
FC Thun (ChL) (Canton of Bern)	1–3 (a.e.t.)	(Canton of Lucerne) FC Luzern (SL)
FC Bulle (PL) (Canton of Fribourg)	1–4	(Canton of Geneva) Servette FC (SL)
FC Bosporus (2Int) (Canton of Bern)	0–8	(Basel-Stadt) FC Basel (SL)
FC Greifensee (2) (Canton of Zurich)	1–2	(Canton of Geneva) FC Onex (2)
SR Delémont (PL) (Canton of Jura)	2–1	(Canton of St. Gallen) FC St. Gallen (SL)
SC Brühl (PL) (Canton of St. Gallen)	0–4	(Vaud) FC Lausanne-Sport (SL)
AC Bellinzona (ChL) (Ticino)	3–1 (a.e.t.)	(Canton of Schaffhausen) FC Schaffhausen (ChL)
FC Tuggen (1) (Canton of Schwyz)	0–3	(Canton of Zurich) FC Zürich (SL)
FC Aarau (ChL) (Aargau)	1–2	(Canton of Zurich) FC Winterthur (SL)

=== Round of 16 ===
The matchups for the round of 16 were drawn on 17 September 2023, following the conclusion of the second round. No more matchup restrictions apply. FC Onex is the last remaining team of the Amateur League.

Team 1	Score	Team 2
AC Bellinzona (ChL) (Ticino)	0–1 (a.e.t.)	(Canton of Zurich) FC Zürich (SL)
FC Onex (2) (Canton of Geneva)	1–6	(Valais) FC Sion (ChL)
FC Rapperswil-Jona (PL) (Canton of St. Gallen)	0–2	(Canton of Bern) BSC Young Boys (SL)
Servette FC (SL) (Canton of Geneva)	1–1; 4–1 (p)	(Vaud) FC Stade Lausanne Ouchy (SL)
FC Black Stars (1) (Basel-Stadt)	2–6	(Canton of Zurich) FC Winterthur (SL)
SR Delémont (PL) (Canton of Jura)	1–0	(Canton of Lucerne) FC Luzern (SL)
FC Lausanne-Sport (SL) (Vaud)	0–4	(Ticino) FC Lugano (SL)
SC Kriens (PL) (Canton of Lucerne)	0–1	(Basel-Stadt) FC Basel (SL)

=== Quarter-finals ===
The matchups for the quarter-finals were drawn on 1 November 2023, following the conclusion of the second round. SR Delémont were the only representative not of the Swiss Football League remaining.

Team 1	Score	Team 2
FC Zürich (SL) (Canton of Zurich)	0–2	(Canton of Zurich) FC Winterthur (SL)
FC Basel (SL) (Basel-Stadt)	2–2; 3–4 (p)	(Ticino) FC Lugano (SL)
SR Delémont (PL) (Canton of Jura)	0–2	(Canton of Geneva) Servette FC (SL)
FC Sion (ChL) (Valais)	2–1	(Canton of Bern) BSC Young Boys (SL)

=== Semi-finals ===
The semi-finals were drawn on 29 February 2024 following the conclusion of the last quarter-final match. FC Sion was the only team remaining that did not play in the Swiss Super League.

Team 1	Score	Team 2
FC Sion (ChL) (Valais)	0–2	(Ticino) FC Lugano (SL)
FC Winterthur (SL) (Canton of Zurich)	0–1	(Canton of Geneva) Servette FC (SL)

=== Final ===
The final took place on 2 June 2024 at the Stadion Wankdorf in Bern. Lugano qualified for their third cup final in a row, having won in 2022. Meanwhile, Servette played their first cup final since 2001, which they won 3–0.

2 June 2024
14:00 CEST (UTC+1)

Servette	0–0 (a.e.t.)	Lugano
	Report
Penalties
Stevanović (penalty scored); Severin (penalty scored); Nishimura (penalty scored); Rouiller (penalty scored); Bolla (penalty missed); Tsunemoto (penalty missed); Douline (penalty scored); Mazikou (penalty scored); Ondoua (penalty scored); Magnin (penalty missed); Mall (penalty scored); Severin (penalty scored)	9–8	(penalty scored) Mai; (penalty scored) Grgić; (penalty scored) Aliseda; (penalty scored) Mahou; (penalty missed) Sabbatini; (penalty missed) Steffen; (penalty scored) Valenzuela; (penalty scored) Doumbia; (penalty scored) Cimignani; (penalty missed) Hajdari; (penalty scored) Saipi; (penalty missed) Mai

Stadion Wankdorf, Bern
Attendance: 27,710
Referee: Alessandro Dudic
