= 2020–21 in Swiss football =

Football in Switzerland
- Season: 2020–21

Men's football
- Super League: Young Boys
- Challenge League: Grasshoppers
- Swiss Cup: Luzern

Women's football
- Swiss Women's Super League: Servette Chênois
- Swiss Cup: Luzern

The following is a summary of the 2020–21 season of competitive football in Switzerland.

== National teams ==
=== Men's national team ===
==== 2020–21 UEFA Nations League ====
===== 2020–21 UEFA Nations League A =====
Pos	Team	Pld	W	D	L	GF	GA	GD	Pts	Qualification or relegation	(Spain)	(Germany)	(Switzerland)	(Ukraine)
1	Spain	6	3	2	1	13	3	+10	11	Qualification for Nations League Finals	—	6–0	1–0	4–0
2	Germany	6	2	3	1	10	13	−3	9		1–1	—	3–3	3–1
3	Switzerland	6	1	3	2	9	8	+1	6 (Note: Tied on head-to-head points (3). Head-to-head goal difference: Switzerland +2, Ukraine −2.)		1–1	1–1	—	3–0 (Note: The Switzerland v Ukraine match was awarded as a 3–0 win to Switzerland after being cancelled as Ukraine were placed in quarantine prior to the match due to positive SARS-CoV-2 tests in the team.)
4	Ukraine (R)	6	2	0	4	5	13	−8	6	Relegation to League B	1–0	1–2	2–1	—

Source: UEFA
Rules for classification: Tiebreakers
(R) Relegated
Notes:

3 September 2020 Group 4	Ukraine	2–1	Switzerland	Lviv, Ukraine
20:45 CEST	Yarmolenko 14'; Zinchenko 68'	Report	41' Seferovic	Stadium: Arena Lviv; Attendance: 0 Referee: Andreas Ekberg (Sweden)

6 September 2020 Group 4	Switzerland	1–1	Germany	Basel, Switzerland
20:45 CEST	Widmer 58'	Report	14' Gündoğan	Stadium: St. Jakob-Park; Attendance: 0 Referee: Michael Oliver (England)

10 October 2020 Group 4	Spain	1–0	Switzerland	Madrid, Spain
20:45 CEST	Oyarzabal 14'	Report		Stadium: Alfredo Di Stéfano; Attendance: 0 Referee: Ali Palabıyık (Turkey)

13 October 2020 Group 4	Germany	3–3	Switzerland	Cologne, Germany
20:45 CEST	Werner 28'; Havertz 55'; Gnabry 60'	Report	5', 57' Gavranović; 26' Freuler	Stadium: RheinEnergieStadion; Attendance: 0 Referee: Ruddy Buquet (France)

14 November 2020 Group 4	Switzerland	1–1	Spain	Basel, Switzerland
20:45 CET	Freuler 26'	Report	89' Gerard	Stadium: St. Jakob-Park; Attendance: 0 Referee: Willie Collum (Scotland)

17 November 2020 Group 4	Switzerland	3–0; Awarded (Note: The Switzerland v Ukraine match was cancelled and awarded as a 3–0 win to Switzerland after the Ukraine national team were placed in quarantine by the Department of Health of the Canton of Lucerne due to positive SARS-CoV-2 tests in the squad. The Ukrainian Association of Football announced they would appeal the decision to the Court of Arbitration for Sport.)	Ukraine	Lucerne, Switzerland
20:45 CET		Report		Stadium: Swissporarena; Referee: Anastasios Sidiropoulos (Greece)

==== 2022 FIFA World Cup qualification ====
Pos	Team	Pld	W	D	L	GF	GA	GD	Pts	Qualification	Switzerland	Italy		Bulgaria	Lithuania
1	Switzerland	8	5	3	0	15	2	+13	18	Qualification for 2022 FIFA World Cup	—	0–0	2–0	4–0	1–0
2	Italy	8	4	4	0	13	2	+11	16	Advance to play-offs	1–1	—	2–0	1–1	5–0
3	Northern Ireland	8	2	3	3	6	7	−1	9		0–0	0–0	—	0–0	1–0
4	Bulgaria	8	2	2	4	6	14	−8	8		1–3	0–2	2–1	—	1–0
5	Lithuania	8	1	0	7	4	19	−15	3		0–4	0–2	1–4	3–1	—

Source: FIFA, UEFA
Rules for classification: Tiebreakers

25 March 2021 Group C	Bulgaria	1–3	Switzerland	Sofia, Bulgaria
20:45 CET	Despodov 47'	Report	7' Embolo; 10' Seferovic; 12' Zuber	Stadium: Vasil Levski National Stadium; Attendance: 0 Referee: Nikola Dabanović (Montenegro)

28 March 2021 Group C	Switzerland	1–0	Lithuania	St. Gallen, Switzerland
20:45 CET	Shaqiri 2'	Report		Stadium: Kybunpark; Attendance: 0 Referee: Mattias Gestranius (Finland)

==== UEFA Euro 2020 ====
Pos	Team	Pld	W	D	L	GF	GA	GD	Pts	Qualification
1	Italy (H)	3	3	0	0	7	0	+7	9	Advance to knockout stage
2	Wales	3	1	1	1	3	2	+1	4 (Note: Tied on head-to-head result (Wales 1–1 Switzerland). Overall goal difference was used as the tiebreaker.)	Advance to knockout stage
3	Switzerland	3	1	1	1	4	5	−1	4	Advance to knockout stage
4	Turkey	3	0	0	3	1	8	−7	0	

Source: UEFA
Rules for classification: Group stage tiebreakers
(H) Hosts
Notes:

12 June 2021 Group A	Wales	1–1	Switzerland	Baku, Azerbaijan
15:00 CET	Moore 74'	Report	49' Embolo	Stadium: Baku Olympic Stadium; Attendance: 8,782; Referee: Clément Turpin (France)

16 June 2021 Group A	Italy	3–0	Switzerland	Rome, Italy
21:00 CET	Locatelli 26', 52'; Immobile 89'	Report		Stadium: Stadio Olimpico; Attendance: 12,445; Referee: Sergei Karasev (Russia)

20 June 2021 Group A	Switzerland	3–1	Turkey	Baku, Azerbaijan
18:00 CET	Seferovic 6'; Shaqiri 26', 68'	Report	62' Kahveci	Stadium: Baku Olympic Stadium; Attendance: 17,138; Referee: Slavko Vinčić (Slovenia)

28 June 2021 Round of 16	France	3–3 (a.e.t.) (4–5 p)	Switzerland	Bucharest, Romania
21:00 CET	Benzema 57', 59'; Pogba 75'	Report	15', 81' Seferovic; 90' Gavranović	Stadium: Arena Națională; Attendance: 22,642; Referee: Fernando Rapallini (Argentina)
	Penalties
	Pogba (penalty scored); Giroud (penalty scored); Thuram (penalty scored); Kimpembe (penalty scored); Mbappé (penalty missed)		(penalty scored) Gavranović; (penalty scored) Schär; (penalty scored) Akanji; (penalty scored) Vargas; (penalty scored) Mehmedi

2 July 2021 Quarter-finals	Switzerland	1–1 (1–3 p)	Spain	Saint Petersburg, Russia
18:00 CET	Shaqiri 68'	Report	8' (o.g.) Zakaria	Stadium: Krestovsky Stadium; Attendance: 24,764; Referee: Michael Oliver (England)
	Penalties
	Gavranović (penalty scored); Schär (penalty missed); Akanji (penalty missed); Vargas (penalty missed)		(penalty missed) Busquets; (penalty scored) Olmo; (penalty missed) Rodri; (penalty scored) Gerard; (penalty scored) Oyarzabal

==== Friendly matches ====
7 October 2020	Switzerland	1–2	Croatia	St. Gallen, Switzerland
20:45 CET	Gavranović 31'	Report	42' Brekalo; 66' Pašalić	Stadium: Kybunpark; Attendance: 4,500; Referee: Tiago Martins (Portugal)

11 November 2020	Belgium	2–1	Switzerland	Leuven, Belgium
20:45 CET	Batshuayi 49', 70'	Report	12' Mehmedi	Stadium: Den Dreef; Attendance: 0 Referee: Jérôme Brisard (France)

31 March 2021	Switzerland	3–2	Finland	St. Gallen, Switzerland
20:45 CET	Gavranović 21'; Vargas 57'; Seferovic 86'	Report	30', 40' (pen.) Pohjanpalo	Stadium: Kybunpark; Attendance: 0 Referee: Manuel Schüttengruber (Austria)

30 May 2021	Switzerland	2–1	United States	St. Gallen, Switzerland
20:15 CEST	Rodríguez 10'; Zuber 63'	Report	5' Lletget	Stadium: Kybunpark; Attendance: 100; Referee: Harm Osmers (Germany)

3 June 2021	Switzerland	7–0	Liechtenstein	St. Gallen, Switzerland
18:00 CEST	Gavranović 19', 75', 79'; Fassnacht 46', 70'; Frick 57' (o.g.); Fernandes 85'	Report		Stadium: Kybunpark; Attendance: 300; Referee: Nejc Kajtazović (Slovenia)

=== Women's national team ===
==== UEFA Women's Euro 2022 qualifying ====
===== UEFA Women's Euro 2022 qualifying, group stage =====
Pos	Team	Pld	W	D	L	GF	GA	GD	Pts	Qualification	Belgium	Switzerland	Romania	Croatia	Lithuania
1	Belgium	8	7	0	1	37	5	+32	21	Final tournament	—	4–0	6–1	6–1	6–0
2	Switzerland	8	6	1	1	20	6	+14	19	Play-offs	2–1	—	6–0	2–0	4–0
3	Romania	8	4	0	4	13	16	−3	12		0–1	0–2	—	4–1	3–0
4	Croatia	8	2	1	5	7	19	−12	7		1–4	1–1	0–1	—	1–0
5	Lithuania	8	0	0	8	1	32	−31	0		0–9	0–3	0–4	1–2	—

Source: UEFA
Rules for classification: Tiebreakers

18 September 2020 Group H	Croatia	1–1	Switzerland	Zaprešić, Croatia
17:30 CET	Rudelić 3'	Report	74' Bachmann	Stadium: Ivan Laljak-Ivić Stadium; Attendance: 0 Referee: Lucie Šulcová (Czech Republic)

22 September 2020 Group H	Switzerland	2–1	Belgium	Thun, Switzerland
19:00 CET	Gut 5'; Lehmann 63'	Report	70' Wullaert	Stadium: Stockhorn Arena; Attendance: 0 Referee: Tess Olofsson (Sweden)

27 October 2020 Group H	Romania	0–2	Switzerland	Mogoșoaia, Romania
16:30 CET		Report	29' Sow; 79' Crnogorčević	Stadium: Football Centre FRF; Attendance: 0 Referee: Melis Özçiğdem (Turkey)

1 December 2020 Group H	Belgium	4–0	Switzerland	Leuven, Belgium
20:00 CET	De Caigny 31', 45+7'; Wullaert 73'; Cayman 85'	Report		Stadium: Den Dreef; Attendance: 0 Referee: Anastasia Pustovoitova (Russia)

===== UEFA Women's Euro 2022 qualifying, play-off round =====
9 April 2021 Play-offs	Czech Republic	1–1	Switzerland	Chomutov, Czech Republic
16:00 CET	Svitková 49' (pen.)	Report	90' (pen.) Crnogorčević	Stadium: Letní stadion Referee: Cheryl Foster (Wales)

13 April 2021 Play-offs	Switzerland	1–1 (a.e.t.) (3–2 p)	Czech Republic	Thun, Switzerland
20:00 CET	Sow 59'	Report	51' Svitková	Stadium: Stockhorn Arena; Referee: Kateryna Monzul (Ukraine)
	Penalties
	Gut (penalty missed); Sow (penalty missed); Lehmann (penalty scored); Wälti (penalty scored); Crnogorčević (penalty scored)		(penalty missed) Bartoňová; (penalty scored) Krejčiříková; (penalty scored) Bertholdová; (penalty missed) Martínková; (penalty missed) Svitková

2–2 on aggregate. Switzerland won 3–2 on penalties and qualified for UEFA Women's Euro 2022.

==== Friendly matches ====
20 February 2021	France	2–0	Switzerland	Metz, France
21:10 CET	Renard 12'; Morroni 81'	Report		Stadium: Stade Saint-Symphorien; Attendance: 0

23 February 2021	France	2–0	Switzerland	Metz, France
21:10 CET	Renard 77', 90+1' (pen.)	Report		Stadium: Stade Saint-Symphorien; Attendance: 0

== League season ==
=== Men ===
==== Raiffeisen Super League ====
Pos	Team	Pld	W	D	L	GF	GA	GD	Pts	Qualification or relegation
1	Young Boys (C)	36	25	9	2	74	29	+45	84	Qualification for the Champions League second qualifying round
2	Basel	36	15	8	13	60	53	+7	53	Qualification for the Europa Conference League second qualifying round
3	Servette	36	14	8	14	45	56	−11	50	Qualification for the Europa Conference League second qualifying round
4	Lugano	36	12	13	11	40	42	−2	49	
5	Luzern	36	12	10	14	62	59	+3	46	Qualification for the Europa Conference League third qualifying round (Note: Luzern qualified for the Europa Conference League third qualifying round as winners of the 2020–21 Swiss Cup.)
6	Lausanne-Sport	36	12	10	14	52	55	−3	46	
7	St. Gallen	36	11	11	14	45	48	−3	44	
8	Zürich	36	11	10	15	53	57	−4	43	
9	Sion (O)	36	8	14	14	48	58	−10	38	Qualification for the relegation play-offs
10	Vaduz (R)	36	9	9	18	36	58	−22	36	Qualification for the Europa Conference League second qualifying round and relegation to Challenge League (Note: Vaduz qualified for the Europa Conference League second qualifying round by being declared winners of the 2020–21 Liechtenstein Cup.)

Source: Swiss Super League
Rules for classification: 1) Points; 2) Goal difference; 3) Goals scored; 4) Head-to-head goal difference; 5) Away goals scored; 6) Draw.
(C) Champions; (O) Play-off winners; (R) Relegated

==== Brack.ch Challenge League ====
Pos	Team	Pld	W	D	L	GF	GA	GD	Pts	Promotion or relegation
1	Grasshoppers (C, P)	36	19	8	9	60	43	+17	65	Promotion to 2021–22 Swiss Super League
2	Thun (Q)	36	19	7	10	57	46	+11	64	Qualification to promotion/relegation play-offs
3	Lausanne-Ouchy	36	15	13	8	57	39	+18	58	
4	Schaffhausen	36	16	10	10	59	46	+13	58	
5	Aarau	36	17	7	12	66	59	+7	58	
6	Winterthur	36	11	10	15	50	52	−2	43	
7	Wil	36	10	9	17	43	52	−9	39	
8	Kriens	36	9	11	16	40	48	−8	38	
9	Xamax	36	10	6	20	36	58	−22	36	
10	Chiasso (R)	36	9	9	18	35	60	−25	36	Relegation to Swiss Promotion League

Updated to match(es) played on 20 May 2021. Source: Swiss Challenge League
Rules for classification: 1) Points; 2) Goal difference; 3) Goals scored; 4) Head-to-head goal difference; 5) Away goals scored; 6) Draw.
(C) Champions; (P) Promoted; (Q) Qualified for the phase indicated; (R) Relegated

==== Swiss Cup ====
24 May 2021
15:00 CEST

St. Gallen	1–3	Luzern
Adamu 42'	Report	27' Ndiaye; 31' Wehrmann; 70' Schürpf

Stadion Wankdorf, Bern
Attendance: 100
Referee: Lionel Tschudi

=== Women ===
==== AXA Women's Super League ====
Pos	Team	Pld	W	D	L	GF	GA	GD	Pts	Promotion or relegation
1	Servette Chênois (C, Q)	27	20	5	2	79	15	+64	65	Qualification to UEFA Women's Champions League
2	Zürich (Q)	27	18	4	5	90	35	+55	58	Qualification to UEFA Women's Champions League
3	YB Frauen	27	13	4	10	63	56	+7	43	
4	Basel	27	11	7	9	58	48	+10	40	
5	Grasshoppers	27	10	8	9	35	45	−10	38	
6	Luzern	27	7	6	14	38	57	−19	27	
7	St. Gallen-Staad	27	7	5	15	47	56	−9	26	
8	Lugano (R)	27	2	1	24	13	111	−98	7	Qualification to relegation play-offs

Updated to match(es) played on 22 May 2021. Source: Women's Super League
Rules for classification: 1) Points; 2) Goal difference; 3) Goals scored; 4) Head-to-head goal difference; 5) Away goals scored; 6) Draw.
(C) Champions; (Q) Qualified for the phase indicated; (R) Relegated

==== AXA Women's Cup ====
5 June 2021
18:00 CEST

Luzern	2–0	Zürich
Fölmli 11', 60'	Report

Letzigrund, Zürich

== Swiss clubs in Europe ==
=== UEFA Champions League ===
==== Qualifying phase and play-off round ====
===== Second qualifying round =====
Team 1	Score	Team 2
Young Boys (Switzerland)	3–1	(Faroe Islands) KÍ

===== Play-off round =====
Team 1	Score	Team 2
Midtjylland (Denmark)	3–0	(Switzerland) Young Boys

=== UEFA Europa League ===
==== Qualifying phase and play-off round ====
===== First qualifying round =====
Team 1	Score	Team 2
Servette (Switzerland)	3–0	(Slovakia) Ružomberok

===== Second qualifying round =====
Team 1	Score	Team 2
Servette (Switzerland)	0–1	(France) Reims
Osijek (Croatia)	1–2	(Switzerland) Basel

===== Third qualifying round =====
Team 1	Score	Team 2
St. Gallen (Switzerland)	0–1	(Greece) AEK Athens
Basel (Switzerland)	3–2	(Cyprus) Anorthosis

===== Play-off round =====
Team 1	Score	Team 2
Basel (Switzerland)	1–3	(Bulgaria) CSKA Sofia

==== Group stage ====
===== Group A =====
Pos	Team	Pld	W	D	L	GF	GA	GD	Pts	Qualification	ROM	YB	CLJ	CSS
1	(Italy) Roma	6	4	1	1	13	5	+8	13	Advance to knockout phase	—	3–1	5–0	0–0
2	(Switzerland) Young Boys	6	3	1	2	9	7	+2	10	Advance to knockout phase	1–2	—	2–1	3–0
3	(Romania) CFR Cluj	6	1	2	3	4	10	−6	5 (Note: Head-to-head points: CFR Cluj 4, CSKA Sofia 1.)		0–2	1–1	—	0–0
4	(Bulgaria) CSKA Sofia	6	1	2	3	3	7	−4	5		3–1	0–1	0–2	—

Source: UEFA
Rules for classification: Group stage tiebreakers

==== Knockout phase ====
===== Round of 32 =====
Team 1	Agg.	Team 2	1st leg	2nd leg
Young Boys (Switzerland)	6–3	(Germany) Bayer Leverkusen	4–3	2–0

===== Round of 16 =====
Team 1	Agg.	Team 2	1st leg	2nd leg
Ajax (Netherlands)	5–0	(Switzerland) Young Boys	3–0	2–0

=== UEFA Women's Champions League ===
==== Knockout phase ====
===== Round of 32 =====
Team 1	Agg.	Team 2	1st leg	2nd leg
St. Pölten (Austria)	3–0	(Switzerland) Zürich	2–0	1–0
Servette Chênois (Switzerland)	2–9	(Spain) Atlético Madrid	2–4	0–5

== Notes ==
Preceded by 2019–20	Seasons in Swiss football	Succeeded by 2021–22
