= 2019–20 in Swiss football =

Football in Switzerland
- Season: 2019–20

Men's football
- Super League: Young Boys
- Challenge League: Lausanne-Sport
- Promotion League: abandoned due to COVID-19 pandemic in Switzerland
- Swiss Cup: Young Boys

Women's football
- Nationalliga A: abandoned due to COVID-19 pandemic in Switzerland
- Swiss Cup: abandoned due to COVID-19 pandemic in Switzerland

The following is a summary of the 2019–20 season of competitive football in Switzerland.

== National teams ==
=== Men's national team ===
==== UEFA Euro 2020 qualifying ====
Pos	Team	Pld	W	D	L	GF	GA	GD	Pts	Qualification	(Switzerland)	(Denmark)	(Republic of Ireland)	(Georgia (country))	(Gibraltar)
1	Switzerland	8	5	2	1	19	6	+13	17	Qualify for final tournament	—	3–3	2–0	1–0	4–0
2	Denmark	8	4	4	0	23	6	+17	16	Qualify for final tournament	1–0	—	1–1	5–1	6–0
3	Republic of Ireland	8	3	4	1	7	5	+2	13	Advance to play-offs via Nations League	1–1	1–1	—	1–0	2–0
4	Georgia	8	2	2	4	7	11	−4	8	Advance to play-offs via Nations League	0–2	0–0	0–0	—	3–0
5	Gibraltar	8	0	0	8	3	31	−28	0		1–6	0–6	0–1	2–3	—

Source: UEFA
Rules for classification: Qualification tiebreakers

5 September 2019 Group D	Republic of Ireland	1–1	Switzerland	Dublin, Ireland
20:45 CEST	McGoldrick 85'	Report	74' Schär	Stadium: Aviva Stadium; Attendance: 44,111; Referee: Carlos del Cerro Grande (Spain)

8 September 2019 Group D	Switzerland	4–0	Gibraltar	Sion, Switzerland
18:00 CEST	Zakaria 37'; Mehmedi 43'; Rodríguez 45+4'; Gavranović 87'	Report		Stadium: Stade de Tourbillon; Attendance: 8,318; Referee: Pavel Orel (Czech Republic)

12 October 2019 Group D	Denmark	1–0	Switzerland	Copenhagen, Denmark
18:00 CEST	Poulsen 84'	Report		Stadium: Parken Stadium; Attendance: 35,964; Referee: Aleksei Kulbakov (Belarus)

15 October 2019 Group D	Switzerland	1–0	Republic of Ireland	Lancy, Switzerland
20:45 CEST	Seferovic 16'; Fernandes 90+3'	Report		Stadium: Stade de Genève; Attendance: 24,766; Referee: Szymon Marciniak (Poland)

15 November 2019 Group D	Switzerland	1–0	Georgia	St. Gallen, Switzerland
20:45 CET	Itten 77'	Report		Stadium: Kybunpark; Attendance: 16,400; Referee: Danny Makkelie (Netherlands)

18 November 2019 Group D	Gibraltar	1–6	Switzerland	Gibraltar, Gibraltar
20:45 CET	Styche 74'	Report	10', 84' Itten; 50' Vargas; 57' Fassnacht; 75' Benito; 86' Xhaka	Stadium: Victoria Stadium; Attendance: 2,079; Referee: Benoît Millot (France)

=== Women's national team ===
==== UEFA Women's Euro 2022 qualifying ====
Pos	Team	Pld	W	D	L	GF	GA	GD	Pts	Qualification	Belgium	Switzerland	Romania	Croatia	Lithuania
1	Belgium	8	7	0	1	37	5	+32	21	Final tournament	—	4–0	6–1	6–1	6–0
2	Switzerland	8	6	1	1	20	6	+14	19	Play-offs	2–1	—	6–0	2–0	4–0
3	Romania	8	4	0	4	13	16	−3	12		0–1	0–2	—	4–1	3–0
4	Croatia	8	2	1	5	7	19	−12	7		1–4	1–1	0–1	—	1–0
5	Lithuania	8	0	0	8	1	32	−31	0		0–9	0–3	0–4	1–2	—

Source: UEFA
Rules for classification: Tiebreakers

3 September 2019 Group H	Switzerland	4–0	Lithuania	Schaffhausen, Switzerland
19:00 CET	Liužinaitė 19' (o.g.); Humm 47'; Bachmann 68'; Crnogorčević 79'	Report		Stadium: LIPO Park; Attendance: 3,123; Referee: Merima Čelik (Bosnia and Herzegovina)

4 October 2019 Group H	Lithuania	0–3	Switzerland	Šiauliai, Lithuania
17:30 CET		Report	35' (pen.) Crnogorčević; 66' Kiwic; 70' (o.g.) Neverdauskaitė	Stadium: Savivaldybė Stadium; Attendance: 237; Referee: Ewa Augustyn (Poland)

8 October 2019 Group H	Switzerland	2–0	Croatia	Thun, Switzerland
19:00 CET	Crnogorčević 9'; Reuteler 31'	Report		Stadium: Stockhorn Arena; Attendance: 4,512; Referee: Katarzyna Lisiecka-Sęk (Poland)

12 November 2019 Group H	Switzerland	6–0	Romania	Schaffhausen, Switzerland
19:00 CET	Bachmann 26', 45', 74'; Crnogorčević 65' (pen.); Humm 81'; Fölmli 88'	Report		Stadium: LIPO Park; Attendance: 3,741; Referee: Shona Shukrula (Netherlands)

==== Friendly matches ====
14 January 2020	Malta	2–2	Switzerland	Ta' Qali, Malta
18:30 CET	Farrugia 51'; Carabott 60'	Report	50', 53' Pando	Stadium: National Stadium

6 March 2020	Switzerland	1–1	Austria	Marbella, Spain
19:00 CET	Mégroz 87'	Report	8' (o.g.) Aigbogun	Stadium: Estadio Municipal

10 March 2020	Austria	1–2	Switzerland	Marbella, Spain
18:00 CET	Puntigam 42'	Report	8', 90+2' (pen.) Crnogorčević	Stadium: Estadio Municipal

== Domestic season ==
=== Super League ===
Pos	Team	Pld	W	D	L	GF	GA	GD	Pts	Qualification or relegation
1	Young Boys (C)	36	23	7	6	80	41	+39	76	Qualificaition for Champions League second qualifying round
2	St. Gallen	36	21	5	10	79	56	+23	68	Qualificaition for Europa League third qualifying round
3	Basel	36	18	8	10	74	38	+36	62	Qualificaition for Europa League second qualifying round
4	Servette	36	12	13	11	57	48	+9	49	Qualificaition for Europa League first qualifying round
5	Lugano	36	11	14	11	46	46	0	47	
6	Luzern	36	13	7	16	42	50	−8	46	
7	Zürich	36	12	7	17	45	72	−27	43	
8	Sion	36	10	9	17	40	55	−15	39	
9	Thun (R)	36	10	8	18	45	67	−22	38	Qualificaition for relegation play-offs
10	Neuchâtel Xamax (R)	36	5	12	19	33	68	−35	27	Relegation to Swiss Challenge League

Source: Swiss Super League
Rules for classification: 1) Points; 2) Goal difference; 3) Goals scored; 4) Head-to-head goal difference; 5) Away goals scored; 6) Draw.
(C) Champions; (R) Relegated

=== Challenge League ===
Pos	Team	Pld	W	D	L	GF	GA	GD	Pts	Promotion or relegation
1	Lausanne (C, P)	36	22	7	7	84	36	+48	73	Promotion to 2020–21 Swiss Super League
2	Vaduz (Note: Vaduz were selected to play in the 2020–21 UEFA Europa League by the Liechtenstein Football Association.) (O, P)	36	18	10	8	78	53	+25	64	Qualification for the Europa League first qualifying round and for the promotion/relegation play-offs
3	Grasshopper	36	17	10	9	69	52	+17	61	
4	Winterthur	36	15	10	11	56	58	−2	55	
5	Kriens	36	16	6	14	58	59	−1	54	
6	Wil	36	14	7	15	60	61	−1	49	
7	Lausanne-Ouchy	36	11	9	16	47	64	−17	42	
8	Aarau	36	10	11	15	65	80	−15	41	
9	Schaffhausen	36	6	14	16	34	62	−28	32	
10	Chiasso	36	5	8	23	44	70	−26	23	

Source: Swiss Challenge League
Rules for classification: 1) Points; 2) Goal difference; 3) Goals scored; 4) Head-to-head goal difference; 5) Away goals scored; 6) Draw.
(C) Champions; (O) Play-off winners; (P) Promoted

=== Promotion League ===
Pos	Team	Pld	W	D	L	GF	GA	GD	Pts	Qualification or relegation
1	Yverdon-Sport	17	11	5	1	45	15	+30	38	No promotion
2	Rapperswil-Jona	17	9	4	4	31	24	+7	31	
3	Stade Nyonnais	17	9	3	5	37	21	+16	30	
4	Étoile Carouge FC	17	8	6	3	35	22	+13	30	
5	Black Stars	17	8	5	4	26	19	+7	29	
6	Bellinzona	17	8	3	6	33	24	+9	27	
7	Brühl	17	8	2	7	31	33	−2	26	
8	Basel U-21	17	5	7	5	21	18	+3	22	
9	Breitenrain	17	6	4	7	32	33	−1	22	
10	Sion U-21	17	6	2	9	21	25	−4	20	
11	Köniz	17	6	2	9	22	38	−16	20	
12	SC Cham	17	4	7	6	22	30	−8	19	
13	Zürich U-21	17	4	6	7	25	31	−6	18	
14	Bavois	17	3	7	7	21	35	−14	16	
15	YF Juventus	17	3	6	8	24	35	−11	15	No relegation
16	Münsingen	17	2	3	12	19	42	−23	9	No relegation

Source: RSSSF
Rules for classification: 1) Points; 2) Goal difference; 3) Goals scored; 4) Head-to-head points; 5) Away goals scored; 6) Draw.

NB: the season was abandoned due to the COVID-19 pandemic; there were no promotions or relegations.

=== Swiss Cup ===
Final

30 August 2020
17:30 CEST

Basel	1–2	Young Boys
Widmer (yellow card) 12'; Alderete 42'; Marchand (yellow card) 62'; Ademi (yellow card) 68'; Van der Werff (yellow card) 74'	Report	Martins (yellow card) 5'; Nsame 50'; Garcia (yellow card) 69'; Ngamaleu (yellow card) 74'; Spielmann 89'

Stadion Wankdorf, Bern
Attendance: 1,000
Referee: (Switzerland) Sandro Schärer

GK	(Serbia) Đorđe Nikolić
DF	(Switzerland) Silvan Widmer
DF	(Switzerland) Jasper van der Werff
DF	(Paraguay) Omar Alderete
DF	(Italy) Raoul Petretta
MF	(Switzerland) Fabian Frei
MF	(Switzerland) Yannick Marchand	(substituted off) 80'
MF	(Switzerland) Valentin Stocker (c)	(substituted off) 86'
MF	(Netherlands) Ricky van Wolfswinkel
ST	(Angola) Afimico Pululu
ST	(Germany) Kemal Ademi
Substitutes:
DF	(Switzerland) Eray Cömert	(substituted on) 80'
MF	(Switzerland) Samuele Campo	(substituted on) 86'
Manager:
(Switzerland) Marcel Koller

GK	(Switzerland) David von Ballmoos
DF	(France) Jordan Lefort
DF	(Guinea) Mohamed Ali Camara
DF	(Switzerland) Fabian Lustenberger (c)	(substituted off) 49'
DF	(Switzerland) Ulisses Garcia	(substituted off) 82'
MF	(Serbia) Miralem Sulejmani	(substituted off) 66'
MF	(Switzerland) Michel Aebischer
MF	(Luxembourg) Christopher Martins	(substituted off) 66'
MF	(Cameroon) Moumi Ngamaleu	(substituted off) 82'
MF	(Switzerland) Christian Fassnacht
ST	(Cameroon) Jean-Pierre Nsame
Substitutes:
DF	(Switzerland) Cédric Zesiger	(substituted on) 49'
MF	(Germany) Gianluca Gaudino	(substituted on) 66'
MF	(Switzerland) Vincent Sierro	(substituted on) 66'
MF	(Switzerland) Marvin Spielmann	(substituted on) 82'
FW	(France) Guillaume Hoarau	(substituted on) 82'
Manager:
(Switzerland) Gerardo Seoane

== Swiss clubs in Europe ==
=== UEFA Champions League ===
==== Qualifying phase and play-off round ====
===== Second qualifying round =====
Team 1	Agg.	Team 2	1st leg	2nd leg
PSV Eindhoven (Netherlands)	4–4 (a)	(Switzerland) Basel	3–2	1–2

===== Third qualifying round =====
Team 1	Agg.	Team 2	1st leg	2nd leg
Basel (Switzerland)	2–5	(Austria) LASK	1–2	1–3

===== Play-off round =====
Team 1	Agg.	Team 2	1st leg	2nd leg
Young Boys (Switzerland)	3–3 (a)	(Serbia) Red Star Belgrade	2–2	1–1

=== UEFA Europa League ===
==== Qualifying phase and play-off round ====
===== Second qualifying round =====
Team 1	Agg.	Team 2	1st leg	2nd leg
Luzern (Switzerland)	2–0	(Faroe Islands) KÍ Klaksvík	1–0	1–0

===== Third qualifying round =====
Team 1	Agg.	Team 2	1st leg	2nd leg
Thun (Switzerland)	3–5	(Russia) Spartak Moscow	2–3	1–2
Luzern (Switzerland)	0–6	(Spain) Espanyol	0–3	0–3

==== Group stage ====
===== Group B =====
Pos	Team	Pld	W	D	L	GF	GA	GD	Pts	Qualification	MAL	KOB	DKV	LUG
1	(Sweden) Malmö FF	6	3	2	1	8	6	+2	11	Advance to knockout phase	—	1–1	4–3	2–1
2	(Denmark) Copenhagen	6	2	3	1	5	4	+1	9	Advance to knockout phase	0–1	—	1–1	1–0
3	(Ukraine) Dynamo Kyiv	6	1	4	1	7	7	0	7		1–0	1–1	—	1–1
4	(Switzerland) Lugano	6	0	3	3	2	5	−3	3		0–0	0–1	0–0	—

Source: UEFA
Rules for classification: Group stage tiebreakers

===== Group C =====
Pos	Team	Pld	W	D	L	GF	GA	GD	Pts	Qualification	BSL	GET	KRA	TRA
1	(Switzerland) Basel	6	4	1	1	12	4	+8	13	Advance to knockout phase	—	2–1	5–0	2–0
2	(Spain) Getafe	6	4	0	2	8	4	+4	12	Advance to knockout phase	0–1	—	3–0	1–0
3	(Russia) Krasnodar	6	3	0	3	7	11	−4	9		1–0	1–2	—	3–1
4	(Turkey) Trabzonspor	6	0	1	5	3	11	−8	1		2–2	0–1	0–2	—

Source: UEFA
Rules for classification: Group stage tiebreakers

===== Group G =====
Pos	Team	Pld	W	D	L	GF	GA	GD	Pts	Qualification	POR	RAN	YB	FEY
1	(Portugal) Porto	6	3	1	2	8	9	−1	10	Advance to knockout phase	—	1–1	2–1	3–2
2	(Scotland) Rangers	6	2	3	1	8	6	+2	9	Advance to knockout phase	2–0	—	1–1	1–0
3	(Switzerland) Young Boys	6	2	2	2	8	7	+1	8		1–2	2–1	—	2–0
4	(Netherlands) Feyenoord	6	1	2	3	7	9	−2	5		2–0	2–2	1–1	—

Source: UEFA
Rules for classification: Group stage tiebreakers

==== Knockout phase ====
===== Round of 32 =====
Team 1	Agg.	Team 2	1st leg	2nd leg
APOEL (Cyprus)	0–4	(Switzerland) Basel	0–3	0–1

===== Round of 16 =====
Team 1	Agg.	Team 2	1st leg	2nd leg
Eintracht Frankfurt (Germany)	0–4	(Switzerland) Basel	0–3	0–1

===== Quarter-finals =====
Team 1	Score	Team 2
Shakhtar Donetsk (Ukraine)	4–1	(Switzerland) Basel

=== UEFA Women's Champions League ===
==== Knockout phase ====
===== Round of 32 =====
Team 1	Agg.	Team 2	1st leg	2nd leg
Lugano (Switzerland)	1–11	(England) Manchester City	1–7	0–4
FC Minsk (Belarus)	4–1	(Switzerland) Zurich	1–0	3–1

Preceded by 2018–19	Seasons in Swiss football	Succeeded by 2020–21
