= Patrick Sutter (footballer) =

Swiss footballer (born 1999)

Personal information
- Date of birth: 18 January 1999 (age 27)
- Place of birth: St. Gallen, Switzerland
- Height: 1.72 m (5 ft 8 in)
- Position: Right-back

Team information
- Current team: Wil
- Number: 21

Youth career
- Team Rheintal/Bodensee
- –2017: St. Gallen

Senior career*
Years	Team	Apps	(Gls)
2017–2023	St. Gallen II	55	(12)
2019–2024	St. Gallen	60	(2)
2019	→ Winterthur II (loan)	9	(2)
2019–2020	→ Brühl (loan)	13	(1)
2024–2026	Lausanne Ouchy	37	(1)
2026–	Wil	8	(0)
- * Club domestic league appearances and goals as of 18 September 2026

Patrick Sutter (born 18 January 1999) is a Swiss footballer who plays for Swiss Challenge League club Wil.

== Club career ==
He was raised in the youth system of St. Gallen and started playing for their U21 team in Swiss 1. Liga in 2017.

He made his Swiss Super League debut for St. Gallen on 24 April 2021 in a game against Vaduz.

On 21 June 2024, Sutter signed with Lausanne Ouchy.

== Career statistics ==
As of match played on 29 May 2023

Club statistics
Club	Season	League			National Cup		Other		Total	
Club	Season	Division	Apps	Goals	Apps	Goals	Apps	Goals	Apps	Goals
FC St. Gallen II	2017–18	Swiss 1. Liga	23	3	—		—		23	3
FC St. Gallen II	2018–19	Swiss 1. Liga	14	7	—		—		14	7
FC St. Gallen II	2020–21	Swiss 1. Liga	11	2	—		—		11	2
FC St. Gallen II	2021–22	Swiss 1. Liga	6	0	—		—		6	0
FC St. Gallen II	2022–23	Swiss Promotion League	1	0	—		—		1	0
FC St. Gallen II	Totals		55	12	0	0	0	0	55	12
FC Winterthur II (loan)	2018–19	Swiss 1. Liga	9	2	—		—		9	2
SC Brühl (loan)	2019–20	Swiss Promotion League	13	1	0	0	—		13	1
St. Gallen	2020–21	Swiss Super League	3	0	0	0	—		3	0
St. Gallen	2021–22	Swiss Super League	20	2	3	0	—		23	2
St. Gallen	2022–23	Swiss Super League	24	0	2	0	—		26	0
St. Gallen	Totals		47	2	5	0	0	0	52	2
Career totals			124	17	5	0	0	0	129	17
