= 2018–19 in Swiss football =

Football in Switzerland
- Season: 2018–19

Men's football
- Super League: Young Boys
- Challenge League: Servette
- Swiss Cup: Basel

Women's football
- Nationalliga A: Zürich
- Swiss Cup: Zürich

The following is a summary of the 2018–19 season of competitive football in Switzerland.

== National teams ==
=== Men's national team ===
==== 2018–19 UEFA Nations League ====
Pos	Team	Pld	W	D	L	GF	GA	GD	Pts	Qualification (Note: Due to revamp of the format for the 2020–21 UEFA Nations League, no teams were eventually relegated.)	(Switzerland)	(Belgium)	(Iceland)
1	Switzerland	4	3	0	1	14	5	+9	9 (Note: Head-to-head goal difference: Switzerland +2, Belgium −2.)	Qualification for Nations League Finals	—	5–2	6–0
2	Belgium	4	3	0	1	9	6	+3	9		2–1	—	2–0
3	Iceland	4	0	0	4	1	13	−12	0		1–2	0–3	—

Source: UEFA
Rules for classification: Tiebreakers
Notes:

8 September 2018 Group A2	Switzerland	6–0	Iceland	St. Gallen, Switzerland
18:00 CEST	Zuber 13'; Zakaria 23'; Shaqiri 53'; Seferovic 67'; Ajeti 71'; Mehmedi 82'	Report		Stadium: Kybunpark; Attendance: 14,912; Referee: Michael Oliver (England)

12 October 2018 Group A2	Belgium	2–1	Switzerland	Brussels, Belgium
18:00 CEST	Lukaku 58', 84'	Report	76' Gavranović	Stadium: King Baudouin Stadium; Attendance: 30,049; Referee: Antonio Mateu Lahoz (Spain)

15 October 2018 Group A2	Iceland	1–2	Switzerland	Reykjavík, Iceland
20:45 CEST	Finnbogason 81'	Report	52' Seferovic; 67' Lang	Stadium: Laugardalsvöllur; Attendance: 8,663; Referee: Andreas Ekberg (Sweden)

18 November 2018 Group A2	Switzerland	5–2	Belgium	Lucerne, Switzerland
20:45 CEST	Rodríguez 26' (pen.); Seferovic 31', 44', 84'; Elvedi 62'	Report	2', 17' T. Hazard	Stadium: Swissporarena; Attendance: 15,000; Referee: Daniele Orsato (Italy)

==== 2019 UEFA Nations League Finals ====
5 June 2019 Semi-final	Portugal	3–1	Switzerland	Porto, Portugal
20:45 CEST	Ronaldo 25', 88', 90'	Report	57' (pen.) Rodríguez	Stadium: Estádio do Dragão; Attendance: 42,415; Referee: Felix Brych (Germany)

9 June 2019 3rd place play-off	Switzerland	0–0 (a.e.t.) (5–6 p)	England	Guimarães, Portugal
15:00 CEST		Report		Stadium: Estádio D. Afonso Henriques; Attendance: 15,742; Referee: Ovidiu Hațegan (Romania)
	Penalties
	Zuber (penalty scored); Xhaka (penalty scored); Akanji (penalty scored); Mbabu (penalty scored); Schär (penalty scored); Drmić (penalty missed)		(penalty scored) Maguire; (penalty scored) Barkley; (penalty scored) Sancho; (penalty scored) Sterling; (penalty scored) Pickford; (penalty scored) Dier

==== UEFA Euro 2020 qualifying ====
Pos	Team	Pld	W	D	L	GF	GA	GD	Pts	Qualification	(Switzerland)	(Denmark)	(Republic of Ireland)	(Georgia (country))	(Gibraltar)
1	Switzerland	8	5	2	1	19	6	+13	17	Qualify for final tournament	—	3–3	2–0	1–0	4–0
2	Denmark	8	4	4	0	23	6	+17	16	Qualify for final tournament	1–0	—	1–1	5–1	6–0
3	Republic of Ireland	8	3	4	1	7	5	+2	13	Advance to play-offs via Nations League	1–1	1–1	—	1–0	2–0
4	Georgia	8	2	2	4	7	11	−4	8	Advance to play-offs via Nations League	0–2	0–0	0–0	—	3–0
5	Gibraltar	8	0	0	8	3	31	−28	0		1–6	0–6	0–1	2–3	—

Source: UEFA
Rules for classification: Qualification tiebreakers

23 March 2019 Group D	Georgia	0–2	Switzerland	Tbilisi, Georgia
15:00 CEST		Report	56' Zuber; 80' Zakaria	Stadium: Boris Paichadze Dinamo Arena; Attendance: 49,207; Referee: Craig Pawson (England)

26 March 2019 Group D	Switzerland	3–3	Denmark	Basel, Switzerland
20:45 CEST	Freuler 19'; Xhaka 66'; Embolo 76'	Report	84' M. Jørgensen; 88' Gytkjær; 90+3' Dalsgaard	Stadium: St. Jakob-Park; Attendance: 18,352; Referee: Damir Skomina (Slovenia)

==== Friendly matches ====
11 September 2018	England	1–0	Switzerland	Leicester, England
21:00 CEST	Rashford 54'	Report		Stadium: King Power Stadium; Attendance: 30,256; Referee: Clément Turpin (France)

14 November 2018	Switzerland	0–1	Qatar	Lugano, Switzerland
19:00 CEST		Report	86' Afif	Stadium: Cornaredo Stadium; Attendance: 4,170; Referee: Kevin Blom (Netherlands)

=== Women's national team ===
==== FIFA Women's World Cup 2019 qualification ====
===== Group stage =====
Pos	Team	Pld	W	D	L	GF	GA	GD	Pts	Qualification	Scotland	Switzerland	Poland	Albania	Belarus
1	Scotland	8	7	0	1	19	7	+12	21	2019 FIFA Women's World Cup	—	2–1	3–0	5–0	2–1
2	Switzerland	8	6	1	1	21	5	+16	19	Play-offs	1–0	—	2–1	5–1	3–0
3	Poland	8	3	2	3	16	12	+4	11		2–3	0–0	—	1–1	4–1
4	Albania	8	1	1	6	6	22	−16	4		1–2	1–4	1–4	—	1–0
5	Belarus	8	1	0	7	5	21	−16	3		1–2	0–5	1–4	1–0	—

Source: UEFA
Rules for classification: Qualification tiebreakers

30 August 2018 Group 2	Scotland	2–1	Switzerland	Paisley, Scotland
20:35 CEST	Cuthbert 2'; Little 6'	Report	7' Dickenmann	Stadium: St Mirren Park; Attendance: 4,098; Referee: Sara Persson (Sweden)

4 September 2018 Group 2	Poland	0–0	Switzerland	Mielec, Poland
17:00 CEST		Report		Stadium: Stadion Stali Mielec; Attendance: 5,128; Referee: Ivana Martinčić (Croatia)

===== Play-offs =====
5 October 2018 Semi-final, 1st leg	Belgium	2–2	Switzerland	Leuven, Belgium
20:30 CEST	Cayman 5'; De Neve 60'	Report	55', 87' Lehmann	Stadium: Den Dreef; Attendance: 7,300; Referee: Anastasia Pustovoitova (Russia)

9 October 2018 Semi-final, 2nd leg	Switzerland	1–1	Belgium	Biel/Bienne, Switzerland
19:00 CEST	Reuteler 23'	Report	77' De Caigny	Stadium: Tissot Arena; Attendance: 2,650; Referee: Jana Adámková (Czech Republic)

3–3 on aggregate. Switzerland won on away goals.

9 November 2018 Final, 1st leg	Netherlands	3–0	Switzerland	Utrecht, Netherlands
20:00 CEST	Spitse 49'; Martens 71'; Miedema 80'	Report		Stadium: Stadion Galgenwaard; Attendance: 23,750; Referee: Pernilla Larsson (Sweden)

13 November 2018 Final, 2nd leg	Switzerland	1–1	Netherlands	Schaffhausen, Switzerland
19:00 CEST	Sow 71'	Report	52' Miedema	Stadium: LIPO Park; Attendance: 5,148; Referee: Stéphanie Frappart (France)

Netherlands won 4–1 on aggregate.

==== 2019 Algarve Cup ====
27 February 2019 Group D	Sweden	4–1	Switzerland	Faro, Portugal
17:45 CEST	Larsson 7', 40', 67'; Asllani 62'	Report	26' Crnogorčević	Stadium: Estádio Algarve; Referee: Laura Fortunato (Argentina)

4 March 2019 Group D	Switzerland	3–1	Portugal	Vila Real de Santo António, Portugal
17:45 CEST	Crnogorčević 60'; Kiwic 66'; Müller 86'	Report	27' Norton	Stadium: VRS António Sports Complex; Referee: Laura Fortunato (Argentina)

6 March 2019 7th place	Switzerland	0–2	Spain	Albufeira, Portugal
14:15 CEST		Report	21' Hermoso; 63' (o.g.) Ismaili	Stadium: Albufeira Municipal Stadium; Referee: María Belén Carvajal (Chile)

==== Friendly matches ====
5 April 2019	Switzerland	0–0	Finland	Biel/Bienne, Switzerland
19:00 CEST		Report		Stadium: Tissot Arena; Attendance: 2,500

9 April 2019	Switzerland	1–0	Slovakia	Winterthur, Switzerland
19:00 CEST	Reuteler 56'	Report		Stadium: Stadion Schützenwiese; Attendance: 2,103

29 May 2019	Italy	1–3	Switzerland	Ferrara, Italy
15:00 CEST	Galli 32'; Girelli 61'; Sabatino 89'	Report	83' Reuteler	Stadium: Stadio Paolo Mazza

14 June 2019	Serbia	1–1	Switzerland	Stara Pazova, Serbia
18:00 CEST	Slović 29' (pen.)	Report	89' Schärz	Stadium: Sports Center FAS

== Domestic season ==
=== Super League ===
Pos	Team	Pld	W	D	L	GF	GA	GD	Pts	Qualification or relegation
1	Young Boys (C)	36	29	4	3	99	36	+63	91	Qualification for the Champions League play-off round
2	Basel	36	20	11	5	71	46	+25	71	Qualification for the Champions League second qualifying round
3	Lugano	36	10	16	10	50	49	+1	46	Qualification for the Europa League group stage
4	Thun	36	12	10	14	57	58	−1	46	Qualification for the Europa League third qualifying round
5	Luzern	36	14	4	18	56	61	−5	46	Qualification for the Europa League second qualifying round
6	St. Gallen	36	13	7	16	49	58	−9	46	
7	Zürich	36	11	11	14	43	52	−9	44	
8	Sion	36	12	7	17	50	55	−5	43	
9	Xamax (O)	36	9	10	17	44	65	−21	37	Qualification for the relegation play-offs
10	Grasshopper (R)	36	5	10	21	32	71	−39	25	Relegation to Swiss Challenge League

Source: Swiss Super League
Rules for classification: 1) Points; 2) Goal difference; 3) Goals scored; 4) Head-to-head goal difference; 5) Away goals scored; 6) Draw.
(C) Champions; (O) Play-off winners; (R) Relegated

=== Challenge League ===
Pos	Team	Pld	W	D	L	GF	GA	GD	Pts	Promotion or relegation
1	Servette (C, P)	36	24	7	5	90	37	+53	79	Promotion to 2019–20 Swiss Super League
2	Aarau	36	19	7	10	63	46	+17	64	Qualification for the promotion/relegation play-offs
3	Lausanne	36	16	15	5	64	36	+28	63	
4	Winterthur	36	16	8	12	57	51	+6	56	
5	Wil	36	10	12	14	33	47	−14	42	
6	Vaduz (Note: Vaduz qualified for the 2019–20 UEFA Europa League as winners of the 2018–19 Liechtenstein Cup.)	36	11	9	16	48	70	−22	42	Qualification for the Europa League first qualifying round
7	Schaffhausen	36	10	9	17	43	62	−19	39	
8	Kriens	36	7	15	14	46	58	−12	36	
9	Chiasso	36	9	9	18	43	67	−24	36	
10	Rapperswil-Jona (R)	36	10	5	21	47	59	−12	35	Relegation to 2019–20 Swiss Promotion League

Source: Swiss Challenge League
Rules for classification: 1) Points; 2) Goal difference; 3) Goals scored; 4) Head-to-head goal difference; 5) Away goals scored; 6) Draw.
(C) Champions; (P) Promoted; (R) Relegated

==== Promotion/relegation play-offs ====
Ninth placed team of 2018–19 Super League, Xamax, faced Aarau, the runner-up of 2018–19 Challenge League.

First leg

30 May 2019
20:00

Xamax	0–4	Aarau
	Report	Maierhofer 22'; Tasar 34', 69'; Mišić 45+2'

Stade de la Maladière, Neuchâtel
Attendance: 12,000
Referee: Stephan Klossner

Second leg

2 June 2019
17:00

Aarau	0–4 (a.e.t.)	Xamax
	Report	Dié 20'; Ošs 29'; Ademi 38'; Tréand 72'
Penalties
Zverotić (penalty missed); Jäckle (penalty scored); Bürgy (penalty scored); Mišić (penalty scored); Karanović (penalty scored)	4–5	(penalty scored) Veloso; (penalty scored) Tréand; (penalty scored) Corbaz; (penalty scored) Ademi; (penalty scored) Dié

Stadion Brügglifeld, Aarau
Attendance: 7,526
Referee: Adrien Jaccottet

Neuchâtel Xamax won on penalties after drawing 4–4 on aggregate and will stay in the Swiss Super League.

=== Promotion League ===
Pos	Team	Pld	W	D	L	GF	GA	GD	Pts	Qualification or relegation
1	Stade Lausanne Ouchy	30	21	6	3	74	28	+46	69	Promotion to 2019–20 Challenge League
2	Yverdon-Sport	30	17	9	4	55	22	+33	60	
3	Bellinzona	30	16	10	4	49	23	+26	58	
4	SC Cham	30	14	8	8	52	40	+12	50	
5	Sion U-21	30	13	6	11	41	38	+3	45	
6	Stade Nyonnais	30	13	4	13	56	36	+20	43	
7	Köniz	30	10	11	9	41	46	−5	41	
8	Bavois	30	9	13	8	48	43	+5	40	
9	Basel U-21	30	9	11	10	49	43	+6	38	
10	Breitenrain	30	11	5	14	44	54	−10	38	
11	Münsingen	30	9	10	11	29	44	−15	37	
12	Brühl	30	9	9	12	53	55	−2	36	
13	Zürich U-21	30	8	9	13	32	44	−12	33	
14	YF Juventus	30	9	2	19	35	54	−19	29	
15	Wohlen	30	6	10	14	40	58	−18	28	Relegation to 2. Liga Interregional
16	La Chaux-de-Fonds	30	2	5	23	25	95	−70	11	Relegation to 2. Liga Interregional

Source: RSSSF

=== Swiss Cup final ===
Basel beat Zürich 3–1 in the first semi-final and FC Thun beat Luzern 1–0 in the other semi to qualify for the final.

19 May 2019
15:00

FC Basel	2–1	FC Thun
Okafor (yellow card) 13'; Ajeti 24' (yellow card) 90+4'; Álvarez (yellow card) 26'; Riveros (yellow card) 65'; Frei 77'; Omlin (yellow card) 87'	SFV summary Report	Stillhart (yellow card) 23'; Sorgić 81'; Costanzo (yellow card) 90+3'

Stade de Suisse Wankdorf Bern, Bern
Attendance: 20,500
Referee: Fedayi San

GK	(Switzerland) Jonas Omlin
DF	(Albania) Taulant Xhaka
DF	(Czech Republic) Marek Suchý (c)
DF	(Peru) Carlos Zambrano
MF	(Paraguay) Blás Riveros
MF	(Colombia) Éder Álvarez Balanta
MF	(Switzerland) Fabian Frei	(substituted off) 90+1'
MF	(Switzerland) Valentin Stocker	(substituted off) 67'
MF	(Switzerland) Luca Zuffi	(substituted off) 72'
ST	(Switzerland) Noah Okafor
ST	(Switzerland) Albian Ajeti
Substitutes:
MF	(Netherlands) Ricky van Wolfswinkel	(substituted on) 90+1'
MF	(Switzerland) Kevin Bua	(substituted on) 67'
FW	(Serbia) Zdravko Kuzmanović	(substituted on) 72'
Manager:
(Switzerland) Marcel Koller

GK	(Switzerland) Guillaume Faivre (c)
DF	(Switzerland) Sven Joss
DF	(Switzerland) Roy Gelmi
DF	(Switzerland) Nicola Sutter	(substituted off) 26'
DF	(Switzerland) Chris Kablan
MF	(Slovenia) Kenan Fatkič
MF	(Switzerland) Matteo Tosetti	(substituted off) 78'
MF	(Switzerland) Moreno Costanzo
MF	(Switzerland) Basil Stillhart
MF	(Switzerland) Marvin Spielmann	(substituted off) 90+4'
ST	(Serbia) Dejan Sorgić
Substitutes:
MF	(Switzerland) Gregory Karlen	(substituted on) 26'
MF	(Liechtenstein) Dennis Salanović	(substituted on) 76'
MF	(Switzerland) Dominik Schwizer	(substituted on) 90+4'
Manager:
(Switzerland) Marc Schneider

== Swiss clubs in Europe ==
=== UEFA Champions League ===
==== Qualifying phase and play-off round ====
===== Second qualifying round =====
Team 1	Agg.	Team 2	1st leg	2nd leg
PAOK (Greece)	5–1	(Switzerland) Basel	2–1	3–0

===== Play-off round =====
Team 1	Agg.	Team 2	1st leg	2nd leg
Young Boys (Switzerland)	3–2	(Croatia) Dinamo Zagreb	1–1	2–1

==== Group stage ====
===== Group H =====
Pos	Team	Pld	W	D	L	GF	GA	GD	Pts	Qualification	JUV	MUN	VAL	YB
1	(Italy) Juventus	6	4	0	2	9	4	+5	12	Advance to knockout phase	—	1–2	1–0	3–0
2	(England) Manchester United	6	3	1	2	7	4	+3	10	Advance to knockout phase	0–1	—	0–0	1–0
3	(Spain) Valencia	6	2	2	2	6	6	0	8	Transfer to Europa League	0–2	2–1	—	3–1
4	(Switzerland) Young Boys	6	1	1	4	4	12	−8	4		2–1	0–3	1–1	—

Source: UEFA

=== UEFA Europa League ===
==== Qualifying phase and play-off round ====
===== Second qualifying round =====
Team 1	Agg.	Team 2	1st leg	2nd leg
St. Gallen (Switzerland)	2–2 (a)	(Norway) Sarpsborg 08	2–1	0–1

===== Third qualifying round =====
Team 1	Agg.	Team 2	1st leg	2nd leg
Vitesse (Netherlands)	0–2	(Switzerland) Basel	0–1	0–1
Olympiacos (Greece)	7–1	(Switzerland) Luzern	4–0	3–1

===== Play-off round =====
Team 1	Agg.	Team 2	1st leg	2nd leg
Basel (Switzerland)	3–3 (a)	(Cyprus) Apollon Limassol	3–2	0–1

==== Group stage ====
===== Group A =====
Pos	Team	Pld	W	D	L	GF	GA	GD	Pts	Qualification	LEV	ZUR	AKL	LUD
1	(Germany) Bayer Leverkusen	6	4	1	1	16	9	+7	13	Advance to knockout phase	—	1–0	4–2	1–1
2	(Switzerland) Zürich	6	3	1	2	7	6	+1	10	Advance to knockout phase	3–2	—	1–2	1–0
3	(Cyprus) AEK Larnaca	6	1	2	3	6	12	−6	5		1–5	0–1	—	1–1
4	(Bulgaria) Ludogorets Razgrad	6	0	4	2	5	7	−2	4		2–3	1–1	0–0	—

Source: UEFA
Rules for classification: Group stage tiebreakers

==== Knockout phase ====
===== Round of 32 =====
Team 1	Agg.	Team 2	1st leg	2nd leg
Zürich (Switzerland)	1–5	(Italy) Napoli	1–3	0–2

=== UEFA Women's Champions League ===
==== Qualifying round ====
Pos	Team	Pld	W	D	L	GF	GA	GD	Pts	Qualification	SUB	BAS	KIR	BRE
1	(Serbia) Spartak Subotica	3	3	0	0	10	0	+10	9	Round of 32	—	—	1–0	4–0
2	(Switzerland) Basel	3	2	0	1	7	5	+2	6		0–5	—	—	4–0
3	(Israel) Kiryat Gat	3	0	1	2	4	8	−4	1		—	0–3	—	—
4	(Montenegro) Breznica Pljevlja (H)	3	0	1	2	4	12	−8	1		—	—	4–4	—

Source: UEFA
Rules for classification: Qualifying round tiebreakers
(H) Hosts

==== Knockout phase ====
===== Round of 32 =====
Team 1	Agg.	Team 2	1st leg	2nd leg
Honka (Finland)	1–6	(Switzerland) Zürich	0–1	1–5

===== Round of 16 =====
Team 1	Agg.	Team 2	1st leg	2nd leg
Zürich (Switzerland)	0–5	(Germany) Bayern Munich	0–2	0–3

Preceded by 2017–18	Seasons in Swiss football	Succeeded by 2019–20
