= Alexis Antunes =

Swiss footballer (born 2000)

Personal information
- Full name: Alexis Antunes Gomez
- Date of birth: 31 July 2000 (age 26)
- Place of birth: Geneva, Switzerland
- Height: 1.81 m (5 ft 11 in)
- Position: Midfielder

Team information
- Current team: Göztepe
- Number: 8

Youth career
- 2009–2011: FC Champel
- 2011–2013: Étoile Carouge
- 2013–2017: Servette

Senior career*
| Years | Team | Apps | (Gls) |
| 2017–2019 | Servette B | 15 | (2) |
| 2017–2025 | Servette | 147 | (13) |
| 2019–2020 | → Chiasso (loan) | 19 | (7) |
| 2026– | Göztepe | 13 | (1) |

International career
| 2014–2015 | Switzerland U15 | 4 | (0) |
| 2015–2016 | Switzerland U16 | 5 | (2) |
| 2016–2017 | Switzerland U17 | 5 | (0) |
| 2017–2018 | Switzerland U18 | 2 | (0) |
| 2018 | Switzerland U19 | 2 | (1) |
| 2019 | Switzerland U20 | 5 | (0) |
| 2020–2021 | Switzerland U21 | 3 | (0) |
- * Club domestic league appearances and goals as of 10 June 2026

Alexis Antunes Gomez (born 31 July 2000) is a Swiss professional footballer who plays as a midfielder for Süper Lig club Göztepe.

== Club career ==
A youth academy graduate of Servette, Antunes made his senior team debut on 24 February 2018 in a 4–0 win against Aarau. On 2 September 2019, Swiss Challenge League club Chiasso announced the signing of Antunes on a season long loan deal. He scored a hat-trick in Chiasso's 3–1 league win against Lausanne Ouchy on 2 August 2020.

== International career ==
Antunes is a current Swiss youth international and has played for seven different youth national teams of Switzerland.

== Career statistics ==
As of match played on 17 December 2023

Club statistics
| Club | Season | League | | | National Cup | | Continental | | Other | | Total | |
| Club | Season | Division | Apps | Goals | Apps | Goals | Apps | Goals | Apps | Goals | Apps | Goals |
|---|---|---|---|---|---|---|---|---|---|---|---|---|
| Servette B | 2017–18 | 2. Liga Interregional | 8 | 1 | — | | — | | — | | 8 | 1 |
| Servette B | 2018–19 | 2. Liga Interregional | 7 | 1 | — | | — | | — | | 7 | 1 |
| Servette B | Total | | 15 | 2 | 0 | 0 | 0 | 0 | 0 | 0 | 15 | 2 |
| Servette | 2017–18 | Swiss Challenge League | 7 | 0 | 1 | 0 | — | | — | | 8 | 0 |
| Servette | 2018–19 | Swiss Challenge League | 7 | 1 | 1 | 1 | — | | — | | 8 | 2 |
| Servette | 2019–20 | Swiss Super League | 0 | 0 | 1 | 0 | — | | — | | 1 | 0 |
| Servette | 2020–21 | Swiss Super League | 14 | 0 | 0 | 0 | 1 (Note: Appearance in the UEFA Europa League) | 1 | — | | 15 | 1 |
| Servette | 2021–22 | Swiss Super League | 30 | 3 | 2 | 3 | 2 (Note: Appearances in the UEFA Europa Conference League) | 0 | — | | 34 | 6 |
| Servette | 2022–23 | Swiss Super League | 28 | 2 | 4 | 1 | — | | — | | 32 | 3 |
| Servette | 2023–24 | Swiss Super League | 10 | 1 | 1 | 0 | 7 (Note: Two appearances in the UEFA Champions League and five appearances in the UEFA Europa League) | 0 | — | | 18 | 1 |
| Servette | Total | | 96 | 7 | 10 | 5 | 10 | 1 | 0 | 0 | 116 | 13 |
| Chiasso (loan) | 2019–20 | Swiss Challenge League | 19 | 7 | 0 | 0 | — | | — | | 19 | 7 |
| Career totals | | | 130 | 16 | 10 | 5 | 10 | 1 | 0 | 0 | 150 | 22 |

== Personal life ==
Antunes was born in Switzerland to a Portuguese father and Spanish mother.
