= Basil Erne =

Swiss footballer (born 2000)

Personal information
- Date of birth: 2 June 2000 (age 26)
- Place of birth: Männedorf, Switzerland
- Height: 1.78 m (5 ft 10 in)
- Position: Defender

Team information
- Current team: Zürich U21
- Number: 51

Youth career
- –2020: Zürich

Senior career*
Years	Team	Apps	(Gls)
2019–	Zürich U21	23	(0)
2020	Zürich	1	(0)
- * Club domestic league appearances and goals as of 11 June 2021

Basil Erne (born 2 June 2000) is a Swiss professional footballer who plays as a left-back for Swiss club Zürich U21.

== Career statistics ==
=== Club ===
As of 20 July 2020.

Club	Season	League			Cup		Continental		Other		Total	
Club	Season	Division	Apps	Goals	Apps	Goals	Apps	Goals	Apps	Goals	Apps	Goals
Zürich U21	2018–19	Swiss Promotion League	3	0	–		–		0	0	3	0
Zürich U21	2019–20	Swiss Promotion League	5	0	–		–		0	0	5	0
Zürich U21	Total		8	0	0	0	0	0	0	0	8	0
Zürich	2019–20	Swiss Super League	1	0	0	0	–		0	0	1	0
Career total			9	0	0	0	0	0	0	0	9	0
