= UEFA Women's Euro 2022 qualifying Group H =

Football tournament qualification stage

Group H of the UEFA Women's Euro 2022 qualifying competition consisted of five teams: Switzerland, Belgium, Romania, Croatia, and Lithuania. The composition of the nine groups in the qualifying group stage was decided by the draw held on 21 February 2019, 13:30 CET (UTC+1), at the UEFA headquarters in Nyon, Switzerland. with the teams seeded according to their coefficient ranking.

The group was played in home-and-away round-robin format between August 2019 and December 2020. The group winners and the three best runners-up among all nine groups (not counting results against the sixth-placed team) qualified directly for the final tournament, while the remaining six runners-up advance to the play-offs.

On 17 March 2020, all matches were put on hold due to the COVID-19 pandemic.

== Standings ==
Pos	Team	Pld	W	D	L	GF	GA	GD	Pts	Qualification	Belgium	Switzerland	Romania	Croatia	Lithuania
1	Belgium	8	7	0	1	37	5	+32	21	Final tournament	—	4–0	6–1	6–1	6–0
2	Switzerland	8	6	1	1	20	6	+14	19	Play-offs	2–1	—	6–0	2–0	4–0
3	Romania	8	4	0	4	13	16	−3	12		0–1	0–2	—	4–1	3–0
4	Croatia	8	2	1	5	7	19	−12	7		1–4	1–1	0–1	—	1–0
5	Lithuania	8	0	0	8	1	32	−31	0		0–9	0–3	0–4	1–2	—

Source: UEFA
Rules for classification: Tiebreakers

== Matches ==
Times are CET/CEST, (Note: CEST (UTC+2) for dates between 31 March and 26 October 2019 and between 29 March and 24 October 2020, and CET (UTC+1) for all other dates.) as listed by UEFA (local times, if different, are in parentheses).

29 August 2019
17:30 (18:30 EEST)

Lithuania	1–2	Croatia
Gailevičiūtė 86'	Report	Dujmenović 37'; Šundov 48'

Savivaldybė Stadium, Šiauliai
Attendance: 423
Referee: Laura Rapp (Sweden)

3 September 2019
19:00

Switzerland	4–0	Lithuania
Liužinaitė 19' (o.g.); Humm 47'; Bachmann 68'; Crnogorčević 79'	Report

LIPO Park Schaffhausen, Schaffhausen
Attendance: 3,123
Referee: Merima Čelik (Bosnia and Herzegovina)
3 September 2019
20:30

Belgium	6–1	Croatia
Cayman 18', 59', 66'; De Caigny 44'; Deloose 74'; Vanmechelen 78'	Report	Lojna 84'

Den Dreef, Leuven
Attendance: 3,344
Referee: Henrikke Nervik (Norway)

4 October 2019
17:30 (18:30 EEST)

Lithuania	0–3	Switzerland
	Report	Crnogorčević 35' (pen.); Kiwic 66'; Neverdauskaitė 70' (o.g.)

Savivaldybė Stadium, Šiauliai
Attendance: 237
Referee: Ewa Augustyn (Poland)

8 October 2019
17:30 (18:30 EEST)

Romania	0–1	Belgium
	Report	De Neve 9'

Stadionul Dr. Constantin Rădulescu, Cluj-Napoca
Attendance: 1,073
Referee: Marta Huerta De Aza (Spain)
8 October 2019
19:00

Switzerland	2–0	Croatia
Crnogorčević 9'; Reuteler 31'	Report

Stockhorn Arena, Thun
Attendance: 4,512
Referee: Katarzyna Lisiecka-Sęk (Poland)

8 November 2019
17:00 (18:00 EET)

Romania	3–0	Lithuania
Vătafu 17' (pen.); Neverdauskaitė 29' (o.g.); Voicu 70' (pen.)	Report

Stadionul Mogoșoaia, Mogoșoaia
Attendance: 150
Referee: Petra Pavlikova (Slovakia)
8 November 2019
18:00

Croatia	1–4	Belgium
Lubina 40'	Report	Wullaert 15' (pen.); Philtjens 31', 56'; De Caigny 81'

Ivan Laljak-Ivić Stadium, Zaprešić
Attendance: 357
Referee: Tess Olofsson (Sweden)

12 November 2019
19:00

Switzerland	6–0	Romania
Bachmann 26', 45', 74'; Crnogorčević 65' (pen.); Humm 81'; Fölmli 88'	Report

LIPO Park Schaffhausen, Schaffhausen
Attendance: 3,741
Referee: Shona Shukrula (Netherlands)
12 November 2019
20:30

Belgium	6–0	Lithuania
De Caigny 14', 32', 46', 66', 73'; Mikutaitė 29' (o.g.)	Report

Den Dreef, Leuven
Attendance: 4,587
Referee: Ivana Projkovska (North Macedonia)

18 September 2020
17:30

Belgium	6–1	Romania
Wullaert 19' (pen.), 45', 51'; Cayman 26'; Dhont 80'; Vanhaevermaet 84'	Report	Rus 53'

Den Dreef, Leuven
Attendance: 0
Referee: Volha Tsiareshka (Belarus)
18 September 2020
17:30

Croatia	1–1	Switzerland
Rudelić 3'	Report	Bachmann 74'

Ivan Laljak-Ivić Stadium, Zaprešić
Attendance: 0
Referee: Lucie Šulcová (Czech Republic)

22 September 2020
18:00 (19:00 EEST)

Romania	4–1	Croatia
Landeka 16' (o.g.); Bătea 39'; Herczeg 45+3'; Rus 67'	Report	Rudelić 9'

Stadionul Mogoșoaia, Mogoșoaia
Attendance: 0
Referee: Ivana Projkovska (Macedonia)
22 September 2020
19:00

Switzerland	2–1	Belgium
Gut 5'; Lehmann 63'	Report	Wullaert 70'

Stockhorn Arena, Thun
Attendance: 0
Referee: Tess Olofsson (Sweden)

23 October 2020 (Note: All matches originally scheduled to be played in April and June 2020 were postponed due to the COVID-19 pandemic in Europe. These matches were subsequently rescheduled to be played between October and December 2020.)
18:00 (19:00 EEST)

Lithuania	0–4	Romania
	Report	Vătafu 63', 81' (pen.); Rus 77'; Vlădulescu 90'

Sūduva Stadium, Marijampolė
Attendance: 0
Referee: Lorraine Watson (Scotland)

27 October 2020
16:30 (17:30 EET)

Romania	0–2	Switzerland
	Report	Sow 29'; Crnogorčević 79'

Football Centre FRF, Mogoșoaia
Attendance: 0
Referee: Melis Özçiğdem (Turkey)
27 October 2020
18:00 (19:00 EET)

Lithuania	0–9	Belgium
	Report	Wullaert 12', 69', 82'; Liužinaitė 14' (o.g.); Gedgaudaitė 21' (o.g.); De Caigny 30', 40', 56'; Minnaert 84'

Sūduva Stadium, Marijampolė
Attendance: 0
Referee: Lina Lehtovaara (Finland)

27 November 2020
16:00

Croatia	1–0	Lithuania
Šundov 81'	Report

Stadion Aldo Drosina, Pula
Attendance: 0
Referee: Rebecca Welch (England)

1 December 2020
20:00

Belgium	4–0	Switzerland
De Caigny 31', 45+7'; Wullaert 73'; Cayman 85'	Report

Den Dreef, Leuven
Attendance: 0
Referee: Anastasia Pustovoitova (Russia)

23 February 2021
16:00

Croatia	0–1	Romania
	Report	Ciolacu 53'

Stadion Aldo Drosina, Pula
Attendance: 0
Referee: Ewa Augustyn (Poland)

== Goalscorers ==
There were 78 goals scored in 20 matches, for an average of 3.9 goals per match.

12 goals

- (Belgium) Tine De Caigny

9 goals

- (Belgium) Tessa Wullaert

5 goals

- (Switzerland) Ramona Bachmann
- (Switzerland) Ana-Maria Crnogorčević
- (Belgium) Janice Cayman

3 goals

- (Romania) Laura Rus
- (Romania) Ștefania Vătafu

2 goals

- (Belgium) Davina Philtjens
- (Croatia) Ivana Rudelić
- (Croatia) Kristina Šundov
- (Switzerland) Fabienne Humm

1 goal

- (Belgium) Laura Deloose
- (Belgium) Elena Dhont
- (Belgium) Marie Minnaert
- (Belgium) Laura De Neve
- (Belgium) Justine Vanhaevermaet
- (Belgium) Davinia Vanmechelen
- (Croatia) Isabella Dujmenović
- (Croatia) Izabela Lojna
- (Croatia) Anela Lubina
- (Lithuania) Dovilė Gailevičiūtė
- (Romania) Mara Bâtea
- (Romania) Mihaela Ciolacu
- (Romania) Andrea Herczeg
- (Romania) Ana Maria Vlădulescu
- (Romania) Andreea Voicu
- (Switzerland) Svenja Fölmli
- (Switzerland) Malin Gut
- (Switzerland) Rahel Kiwic
- (Switzerland) Alisha Lehmann
- (Switzerland) Géraldine Reuteler
- (Switzerland) Coumba Sow

1 own goal

- (Lithuania) Gabija Gedgaudaitė (against Belgium)
- (Lithuania) Algimantė Mikutaitė (against Belgium)
- (Croatia) Iva Landeka (against Romania)

2 own goals

- (Lithuania) Milda Liužinaitė (against Switzerland and Belgium)
- (Lithuania) Vestina Neverdauskaitė (against Romania and Switzerland)
