= Kristina Šundov =

Croatian footballer

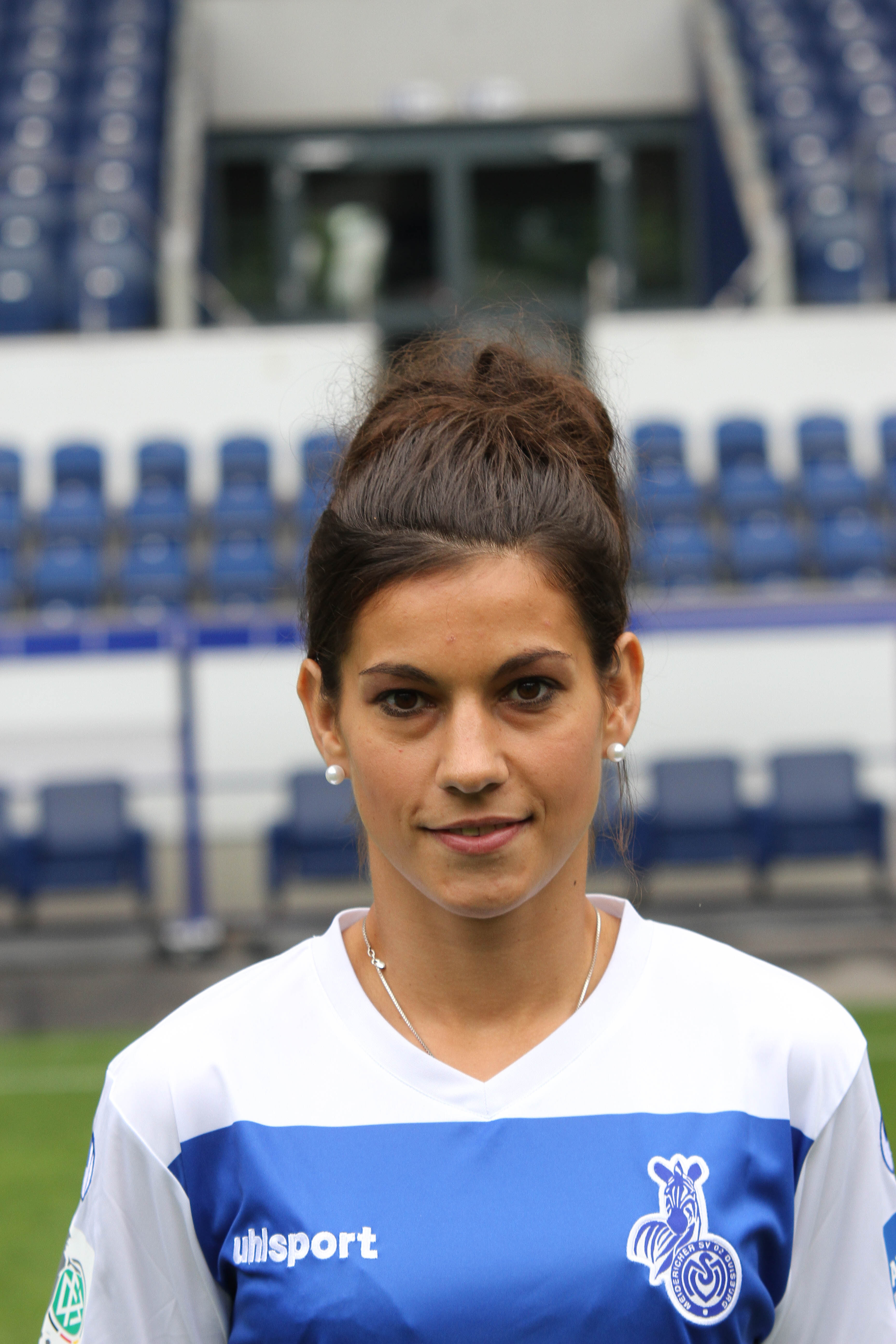

Personal information
- Full name: Kristina Šundov
- Date of birth: 17 September 1986 (age 40)
- Place of birth: Split, SFR Yugoslavia
- Position: Striker

Team information
- Current team: Basel
- Number: 8

Senior career*
Years	Team	Apps	(Gls)
2001–2003	Dinara		
2003–2005	Kaštela		
2005–2009	Zuchwil		
2009–2011	Thun		
2011–2012	Basel	14	(5)
2012–2014	Telstar	31	(7)
2014–2015	Duisburg	30	(5)
2015–2016	Bayer 04 Leverkusen	23	(4)
2016–2023	Basel	132	(63)

International career^{‡}
2003–2020	Croatia	17	(2)

Managerial career
- 2023–2026: Basel (assistant manager)
- 2026–: Bayer 04 Leverkusen (assistant manager)
- * Club domestic league appearances and goals as of 31 July 2023 ‡ National team caps and goals as of 9 September 2012

Kristina Šundov (born 17 September 1986) is a Croatian former footballer who played as a striker for Basel of the Swiss Nationalliga A. Previously, she had played for Bayer 04 Leverkusen and MSV Duisburg in the German Bundesliga, Telstar in the BeNe League and in the Swiss Nationalliga A for FFC Zuchwil 05 (with which she played the European Cup), FC Thun and FC Basel. She is a member of the Croatian national team; she made her debut in May 2003 against Slovenia.. As of July 2026, she is the assistant coach of her former team, Bayer 04 Leverkusen.

== International goals ==
No.	Date	Venue	Opponent	Score	Result	Competition
1.	29 August 2019	Savivaldybė Stadium, Šiauliai, Lithuania	Lithuania	2–0	2–1	UEFA Women's Euro 2022 qualifying
2.	27 November 2020	Stadion Aldo Drosina, Pula, Croatia	Lithuania	1–0	1–0	UEFA Women's Euro 2022 qualifying
