= UEFA Women's Euro 2022 qualifying play-offs =

Tournament details
- Dates: 9 April 2021 – 13 April 2021
- Teams: 6 (from 1 confederation)

Tournament statistics
- Matches played: 6
- Goals scored: 10 (1.67 per match)

The play-offs of the UEFA Women's Euro 2022 qualifying competition involved the six runners-up with the worst records among all nine groups in the qualifying group stage.

The play-offs were played in home-and-away two-legged format. Originally, the three play-off winners qualified for the final tournament. One of those winners, Russia, were banned later.

== Ranking of second-placed teams ==
As groups A and B had six teams and the others had five, to determine the three best second-placed teams from the qualifying group stage which qualified directly for the final tournament and the six remaining second-placed teams which advanced to the play-offs, only the results of the second-placed teams against the first, third, fourth, and fifth-placed teams in their group were taken into account, while results against the sixth-placed team are not included. As a result, eight matches played by each second-placed team were counted for the purposes of determining the ranking.

Pos	Grp	Team	Pld	W	D	L	GF	GA	GD	Pts	Qualification
1	B	Italy	8	6	1	1	30	5	+25	19	Final tournament
2	F	Iceland	8	6	1	1	25	5	+20	19	Final tournament
3	G	Austria	8	6	1	1	22	3	+19	19	Final tournament
4	H	Switzerland	8	6	1	1	20	6	+14	19	Play-offs
5	E	Portugal	8	6	1	1	10	2	+8	19	Play-offs
6	A	Russia	8	6	0	2	16	6	+10	18	Play-offs
7	D	Czech Republic	8	5	1	2	24	9	+15	16	Play-offs
8	I	Ukraine	8	5	0	3	16	21	−5	15	Play-offs
9	C	Northern Ireland	8	4	2	2	17	17	0	14	Play-offs

Source: UEFA
Rules for classification: 1) points; 2) goal difference; 3) goals scored; 4) away goals scored; 5) wins; 6) away wins; 7) disciplinary points; 8) coefficient ranking.

== Draw ==
The draw for the play-offs was held on 5 March 2021 (originally 25 September 2020, but had been postponed due to the COVID-19 pandemic), 12:00 CET (UTC+1), at the UEFA headquarters in Nyon, Switzerland. The six teams were drawn into three ties without any seeding, with the first team drawn in each tie to be the home team of the first leg. Based on political restrictions, Russia and Ukraine could not be drawn against each other.

== Summary ==
The first legs were played on 9 April, and the second legs were held on 13 April 2021. Originally, the three play-off winners qualified for the final tournament. However following the Russian invasion of Ukraine, Russia were banned from the final tournament, and Portugal qualified in their place.

Team 1	Agg.	Team 2	1st leg	2nd leg
Ukraine	1–4	Northern Ireland	1–2	0–2
Portugal	0–1	Russia	0–1	0–0
Czech Republic	2–2 (2–3 p)	Switzerland	1–1	1–1 (a.e.t.)

== Matches ==
Times are CEST (UTC+2), as listed by UEFA (local times, if different, are in parentheses).

9 April 2021
18:00 (19:00 EEST)

Ukraine	1–2	Northern Ireland
Apanashchenko 22'	Report	Furness 5'; Magill 57'

Kolos Stadium, Kovalivka
Attendance: 0
Referee: Riem Hussein (Germany)
13 April 2021
20:45 (19:45 BST)

Northern Ireland	2–0	Ukraine
Callaghan 55'; Caldwell 90+6'	Report

Seaview, Belfast
Attendance: 0
Referee: Jana Adámková (Czech Republic)

Northern Ireland won 4–1 on aggregate and qualified for UEFA Women's Euro 2022.

9 April 2021
19:30 (18:30 WEST)

Portugal	0–1	Russia
	Report	Korovkina 51'

Estádio do Restelo, Lisbon
Attendance: 0
Referee: Esther Staubli (Switzerland)
13 April 2021
16:00 (17:00 MSK)

Russia	0–0	Portugal
	Report

Sapsan Arena, Moscow
Attendance: 850
Referee: Stéphanie Frappart (France)

Russia won 1–0 on aggregate, but were banned from UEFA Women's Euro 2022 due to their country's invasion of Ukraine. Portugal qualified instead.

9 April 2021
16:00

Czech Republic	1–1	Switzerland
Svitková 49' (pen.)	Report	Crnogorčević 90' (pen.)

Letní stadion, Chomutov
Attendance: 0
Referee: Cheryl Foster (Wales)
13 April 2021
20:00

Switzerland	1–1 (a.e.t.)	Czech Republic
Sow 59'	Report	Svitková 51'
Penalties
Gut (penalty missed); Sow (penalty missed); Lehmann (penalty scored); Wälti (penalty scored); Crnogorčević (penalty scored)	3–2	(penalty missed) Bartoňová; (penalty scored) Krejčiříková; (penalty scored) Bertholdová; (penalty missed) Martínková; (penalty missed) Svitková

Stockhorn Arena, Thun
Attendance: 0
Referee: Kateryna Monzul (Ukraine)

2–2 on aggregate. Switzerland won 3–2 on penalties and qualified for UEFA Women's Euro 2022.

== Goalscorers ==
There were 10 goals scored in 6 matches, for an average of 1.67 goals per match.

2 goals

- (Czech Republic) Kateřina Svitková

1 goal

- (Northern Ireland) Nadene Caldwell
- (Northern Ireland) Marissa Callaghan
- (Northern Ireland) Rachel Furness
- (Northern Ireland) Simone Magill
- (Russia) Nelli Korovkina
- (Switzerland) Ana-Maria Crnogorčević
- (Switzerland) Coumba Sow
- (Ukraine) Daryna Apanashchenko
