= Laura De Neve =

Belgian footballer (born 1994)

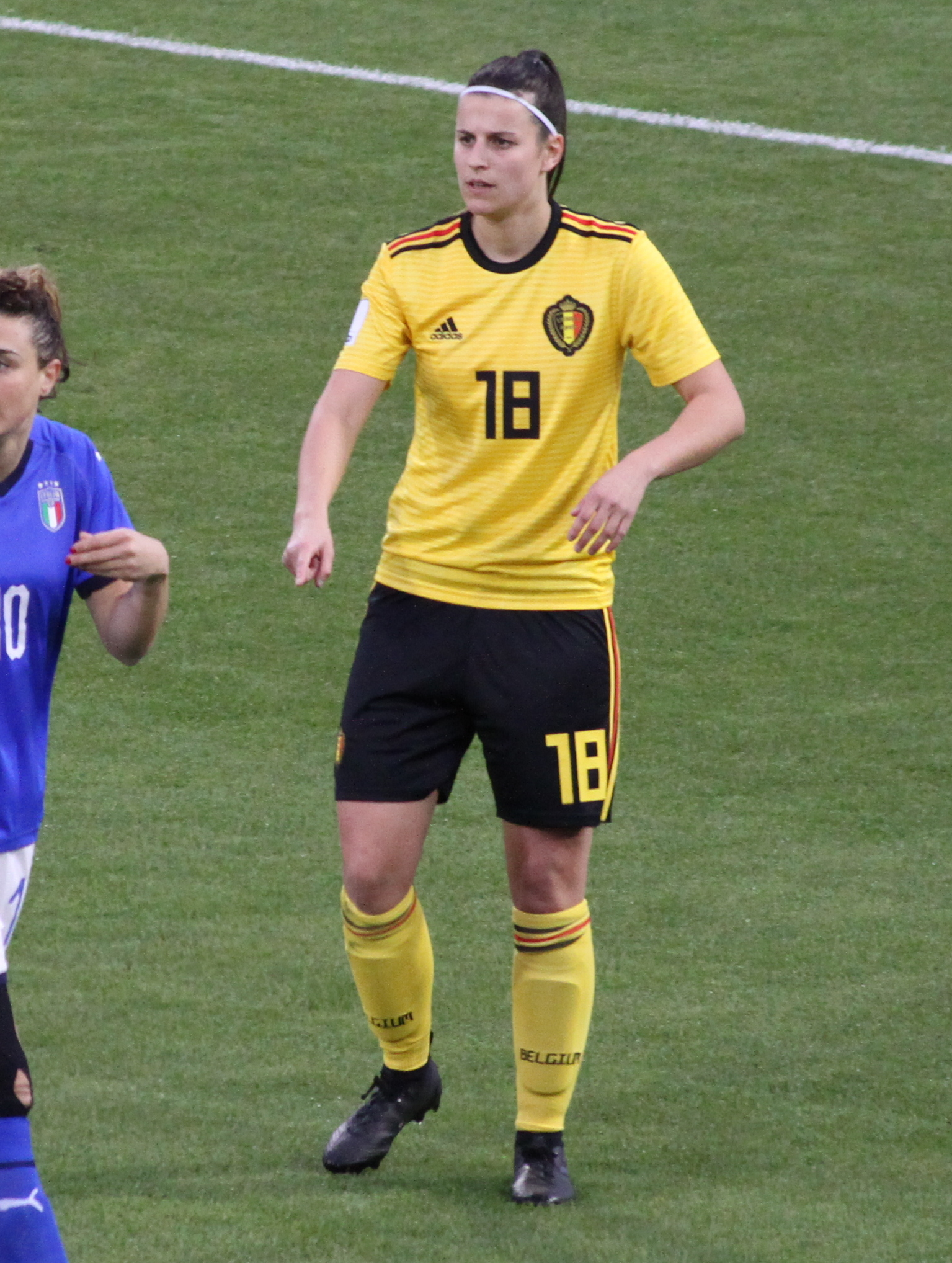
- De Neve in 2018

Personal information
- Full name: Laura De Neve
- Date of birth: 9 October 1994 (age 32)
- Place of birth: Belgium
- Height: 1.74 m (5 ft 9 in)
- Position: Defender

Team information
- Current team: Anderlecht
- Number: 8

Youth career
- FCV Dender EH

Senior career*
Years	Team	Apps	(Gls)
–2012	FCV Dender EH		
2012–	Anderlecht	67	(8)

International career^{‡}
2008–2009	Belgium U15	3	(0)
2009–2011	Belgium U17	25	(4)
2008–2013	Belgium U19	19	(1)
2013–	Belgium	65	(3)
- * Club domestic league appearances and goals as of 16 March 2017 ‡ National team caps and goals as of 5 December 2024

Laura De Neve (born 9 October 1994) is a Belgian footballer. She plays as a defender for Anderlecht and the Belgium women's national football team.

== Club career ==
De Neve started her career the Dender youth team. As from season 2012–13 she transferred to RSC Anderlecht. In 2012–13 she won with Anderlecht the Belgian Women's Cup. In season 2015–16 she played again in the final in the Cup but they lost against Lierse SK.

De Neve has won seven league titles in a row with Anderlecht, sweeping the Belgian Women's Super League from the 2017–18 season right through to 2023–24.

== International career ==
In 2016, she played for the Flames 3 games in the Algarve Cup in Portugal.

She was selected for the 2017 Cyprus Cup games. Because an injury in the competition with Anderlecht against Oud-Heverlee Leuven, therefore she had to forfeit the Cyprus Cup and was replaced by Sarah Wijnants in the selection.

In recent years she remained a regular choice in the senior team. De Neve was part of the squad at the Pinatar Cup 2022 in Spain, where Belgium won their very first trophy after defeating Russia in the final.

De Neve went on and represented Belgium at the UEFA Women's Euro 2022 and played 2 of the 3 group matches (against Iceland and France), and again in the quarter finals where they lost against Sweden.

She went on to contribute to Belgium's successful qualification for UEFA Women's Euro 2025 via the play-offs, winning both legs of the play-off final against Ukraine.

== Career statistics ==
=== International ===
From 2008 to 2013

Belgium U15
Year	Caps	Goals
2008	2	0
2009	1	0
Total	3	0

From 2009 to 2011

Belgium U17
Year	Caps	Goals
2009	10	3
2010	10	1
2011	5	0
Total	25	4

From 2008 to 2013

Belgium U19
Year	Caps	Goals
2008	2	0
2009	0	0
2010	0	0
2011	6	1
2012	8	0
2013	3	0
Total	19	1

As of 6 October 2022

Belgium
Year	Caps	Goals
2013	2	0
2014	1	0
2015	0	0
2016	6	0
2017	6	0
2018	9	1
2019	12	1
2020	6	0
2021	5	0
2022	12	0
Total	59	2

As of match played 6 October 2022

List of international goals scored by Laura De Neve
No.	Date	Venue	Opponent	Score	Result	Competition
1	5 October 2018	Den Dreef, Leuven, Belgium	Switzerland	2–1	2–2	2019 FIFA Women's World Cup qualifying
2	8 October 2019	Stadionul Dr. Constantin Rădulescu, Cluj-Napoca, Romania	Romania	0–1	0–1	UEFA Women's Euro 2022 qualification
3	31 October 2023	Den Dreef, Leuven, Belgium	England	1–0	3–2	2023–24 UEFA Women's Nations League

== Honours ==
Anderlecht

- Belgian Women's Super League: 2017–18, 2018–19, 2019–20, 2020–21, 2021–22, 2022–23, 2023–24
- Belgian Women's Cup: 2022

Belgium

- Pinatar Cup: 2022
