= Gabija Gedgaudaitė =

Lithuanian footballer

Personal information
- Date of birth: 13 July 2000 (age 26)
- Height: 1.84 m (6 ft 0 in)
- Position: Forward

Senior career*
Years	Team	Apps	(Gls)
–2018	Žalgiris		
2018–2020	Medyk Konin	35	(2)
2020–?	Žalgiris		

International career^{‡}
- Lithuania
- * Club domestic league appearances and goals as of 29 February 2020 ‡ National team caps and goals as of 23:51, 31 August 2019 (UTC)

Gabija Gedgaudaitė (born 13 July 2000) is a Lithuanian footballer who plays as a forward. She has played for the Lithuania women's national team.

== Career ==
Gedgaudaitė has been capped for the Lithuania national team, appearing for the team during the UEFA Women's Euro 2021 qualifying cycle.

== Honours ==
Medyk Konin

- Polish Cup: 2018–19
