= Vestina Neverdauskaitė =

Lithuanian footballer

Personal information
- Date of birth: 19 September 1993 (age 33)
- Height: 1.65 m (5 ft 5 in)
- Position: Defender

Team information
- Current team: Gintra Universitetas
- Number: 13

International career^{‡}
Years	Team	Apps	(Gls)
	Lithuania	61	(0)
- ‡ National team caps and goals as of 25 November 2025 (UTC)

Vestina Neverdauskaitė (born 19 September 1993) is a Lithuanian footballer who plays as a defender and has appeared for the Lithuania women's national team.

== Career ==
Neverdauskaitė has been capped for the Lithuania national team, appearing for the team during the 2019 FIFA Women's World Cup qualifying cycle.
