= Coumba Sow =

Swiss footballer (born 1994)

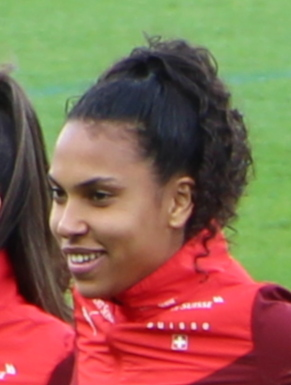

Personal information
- Full name: Coumba Louisa Sow
- Date of birth: 27 August 1994 (age 32)
- Place of birth: Zürich, Switzerland
- Height: 1.78 m (5 ft 10 in)
- Position: Midfielder

Team information
- Current team: Basel
- Number: 18

College career
Years	Team	Apps	(Gls)
2016–2017	Oklahoma State	25	(13)

Senior career*
Years	Team	Apps	(Gls)
2013	FC Zürich		
2018	FC Zürich		
2019–2023	Paris FC	51	(6)
2023	Servette FC	12	(6)
2023–	Basel	14	(2)

International career^{‡}
2018–	Switzerland	33	(14)
- * Club domestic league appearances and goals as of 24 March 2024 ‡ National team caps and goals as of 20 September 2023 (UTC)

Coumba Louisa Sow (born 27 August 1994) is a Swiss footballer who plays as a midfielder for FC Basel in the Swiss Women's Super League and has appeared for the Switzerland national team.

== Career ==
At the age of 12 she started playing football for SV Höngg. After two years she switched to the youth department of FC Zürich. She went to the USA and played for two years for Monroe Community College. In 2016, she joined the Oklahoma State Cowgirls for two years. After the first two games with Oklahoma, she suffered a cruciate ligament rupture in training and had to sit out the entire year of 2016. In 2017 she was able to play for Oklahoma State again.

In 2018, Sow returned to FC Zurich. During her time at FCZ, she worked 75% in a day care center. In 2019 he switched to Paris FC. At the end of January 2023, she moved back to Switzerland, to Servette FC Chênois Féminin, to get more match practice ahead of the World Cup. At the end of the season she left the club.

From the 2023/24 season she plays for FC Basel. She signed for three years.

== National team ==
Sow made her debut for the national team on November 13, 2018 in the World Cup qualifier against the Netherlands. She appeared for the team during the 2019 World Cup qualifying cycle. Sow took part in the Euro 2022 and was in the starting lineup for the Swiss in all three group games. Switzerland was eliminated after the preliminary round.

On 23 June 2025, Sow was called up to the Switzerland squad for the UEFA Women's Euro 2025.

== International goals ==
No.	Date	Venue	Opponent	Score	Result	Competition
1.	13 November 2018	wefox Arena Schaffhausen, Schaffhausen, Switzerland	Netherlands	1–1	1–1	2019 FIFA Women's World Cup qualification – UEFA play-offs
2.	27 October 2020	Football Centre FRF, Mogoșoaia, Romania	Romania	1–0	2–0	UEFA Women's Euro 2022 qualifying
3.	13 April 2021	Stockhorn Arena, Thun, Switzerland	Czech Republic	1–1	1–1 (a.e.t.) (3–2 p)	UEFA Women's Euro 2022 qualifying play-offs
4.	17 September 2021	Stockhorn Arena, Thun, Switzerland	Lithuania	2–0	4–1	2023 FIFA Women's World Cup qualification
5.	21 September 2021	Zimbru Stadium, Chișinău, Moldova	Moldova	2–0	6–0	2023 FIFA Women's World Cup qualification
6.	26 November 2021	Stadio Renzo Barbera, Palermo, Italy	Italy	1–0	2–1	2023 FIFA Women's World Cup qualification
7.	30 November 2021	LFF Stadium, Vilnius, Lithuania	Lithuania	1–0	7–0	2023 FIFA Women's World Cup qualification
8.	30 November 2021	LFF Stadium, Vilnius, Lithuania	Lithuania	3–0	7–0	2023 FIFA Women's World Cup qualification
9.	30 November 2021	LFF Stadium, Vilnius, Lithuania	Lithuania	5–0	7–0	2023 FIFA Women's World Cup qualification
10.	9 July 2022	Leigh Sports Village, Leigh, England	Portugal	1–0	2–2	UEFA Women's Euro 2022
11.	6 September 2022	Stade de la Tuilière, Lausanne, Switzerland	Moldova	3–0	15–0	2023 FIFA Women's World Cup qualification
12.	6 September 2022	Stade de la Tuilière, Lausanne, Switzerland	Moldova	5–0	15–0	2023 FIFA Women's World Cup qualification
13.	6 September 2022	Stade de la Tuilière, Lausanne, Switzerland	Moldova	6–0	15–0	2023 FIFA Women's World Cup qualification
14.	30 June 2023	Tissot Arena, Biel/Bienne, Switzerland	Zambia	3–3	3–3	Friendly

== Personal life ==
Sow grew up in the Oerlikon district. She is of Senegalese descent through her father. She is the cousin of Djibril Sow, another Swiss international footballer.
