= Ramona Bachmann =

Swiss footballer (born 1990)

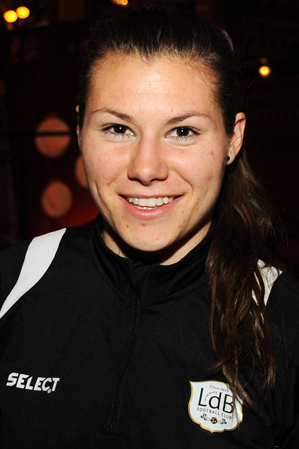
- Bachmann with Malmö in 2013

Personal information
- Full name: Ramona Bachmann
- Date of birth: 25 December 1990 (age 35)
- Place of birth: Malters, Switzerland
- Height: 1.62 m (5 ft 4 in)
- Position: Forward

Team information
- Current team: BSC YB Frauen
- Number: 17

Youth career
- 1997–2006: FC Malters

Senior career*
Years	Team	Apps	(Gls)
2006–2007	Luzern		
2007–2009	Umeå	50	(27)
2010	Atlanta Beat	10	(1)
2010–2011	Umeå	21	(13)
2011–2015	Rosengård	74	(45)
2015–2016	Wolfsburg	24	(5)
2017–2020	Chelsea	48	(7)
2020–2024	Paris Saint-Germain	60	(12)
2024–2025	Houston Dash	14	(2)
2026–	BSC YB Frauen	0	(0)

International career^{‡}
2005–2006	Switzerland U17	4	(1)
2006–2009	Switzerland U19	9	(7)
2007–	Switzerland	153	(60)
- * Club domestic league appearances and goals as of 14:17, 12 September 2025 (UTC) ‡ National team caps and goals as of 23:00, 8 April 2025 (UTC)

Ramona Bachmann (German pronunciation: [raˈmoːna ˈbaxman]; born 25 December 1990) is a Swiss professional footballer who plays as a forward for BSC YB Frauen and the Swiss national team.

Bachmann, who is from Malters, moved to Sweden aged 16 and played for Umeå IK for four seasons from 2007 until 2011. She spent the 2010 season playing in the United States for Women's Professional Soccer (WPS) club Atlanta Beat. Ahead of the 2012 season she left Umeå and signed a contract with LdB FC Malmö. She went to German Frauen-Bundesliga club VfL Wolfsburg in the summer of 2015.

Since making her debut for the Switzerland women's national football team in June 2007, Bachmann has won over 150 caps. She made her reputation with Switzerland's youth national teams, playing at the 2006 and 2010 editions of the FIFA U-20 Women's World Cup and being named UEFA's Golden Player at the 2009 UEFA Women's Under-19 Championship. At senior level Bachmann helped Switzerland qualify for the FIFA Women's World Cup for the first time in 2015. A persistent back injury hampered Bachmann's progress during the early part of her career.

== Club career ==
Starting her career in FC Malters before moving to SC Luwin, she then rejected offers from both Germany and USA to sign for Swedish club Umeå IK in Damallsvenskan at the age of 16 in 2007. Following Marta's departure from the club in 2009, Bachmann became a key player at Umeå. She was voted Swiss female Player of the Year in 2009.

In 2010, Bachmann joined new Women's Professional Soccer expansion team Atlanta Beat as their No. 1 pick in the 2009 WPS International Draft. After an injury-hit season in the professional WPS, and after her contract with the Atlanta Beat was not renewed, Bachmann rejected offers from Germany, England and the United States to return to Umeå for the 2011 season.

She was named the best player of the 2011 season, and subsequently moved to defending champion LdB Malmö. Playing alongside Marta, Mittag and others, she slowly turned into one of the best footballers in the world. She won the Damallsvenskan in her last season with LdB Malmö.

On 26 August 2015 it was announced that Bachmann had joined German side VfL Wolfsburg for a contract that will last until 2018. She was chosen Swiss Player of the Year for a second time in 2015. In December 2016, London-based FA WSL club Chelsea announced that Bachmann had agreed to join them when the transfer window opened the following month.

In 2018, on 5 May, Bachmann scored twice, including the winning goal, in the Women's FA Cup final against Arsenal, a game which ended 3–1 to Bachmann's team, Chelsea. She was named the Player of the Match by commentator Sue Smith.

On 3 July 2020, French club Paris Saint-Germain announced the signing of Bachmann on a two-year deal.

On 3 April 2024, the Houston Dash announced that they had acquired Bachmann from Paris Saint-Germain for an undisclosed transfer fee. She recorded 14 appearances (10 starts) before departing from the club on a mutual contract termination in September 2025.

== International career ==
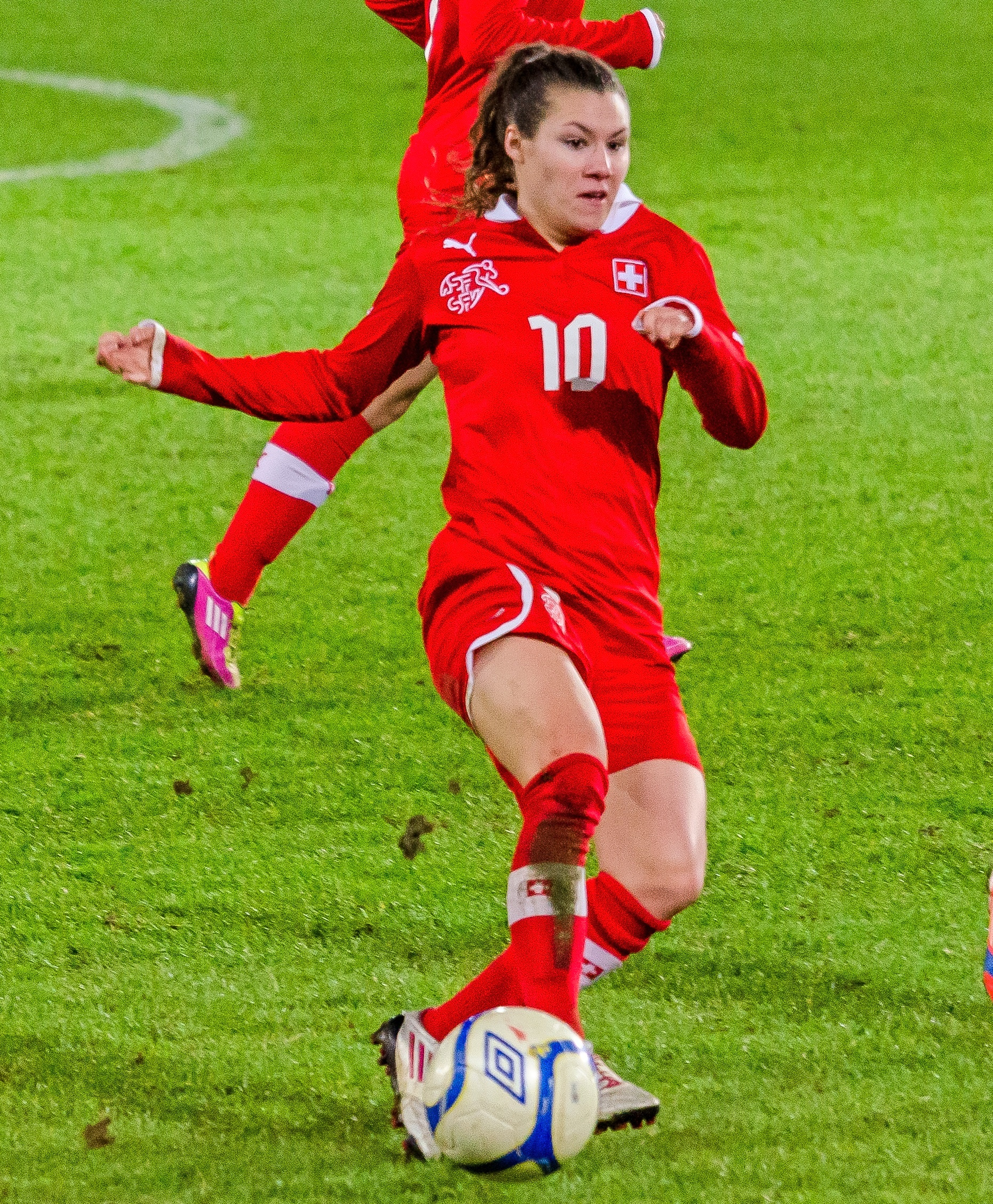
Ramona Bachmann playing for Switzerland, October 2012

Bachmann played for Switzerland in the 2006 and 2010 editions of the FIFA U-20 Women's World Cup. During the latter tournament she was hampered by a back injury. At the 2009 UEFA Women's Under-19 Championship in Belarus, Bachmann won the UEFA.com Golden Player award.

Bachmann made her debut for the Swiss senior team against Sweden in June 2007, while only being 16 years of age . In September 2010 Bachmann scored in Switzerland's 2011 FIFA Women's World Cup qualifying defeat against England, but was criticised for her play acting that led to the dismissal of England goalkeeper Rachel Brown. Bachmann admitted there was no foul and apologised for her actions, while Brown's red card was rescinded on appeal.

Bachmann was ruled out of the following play-offs against Denmark due to her persistent back pain.

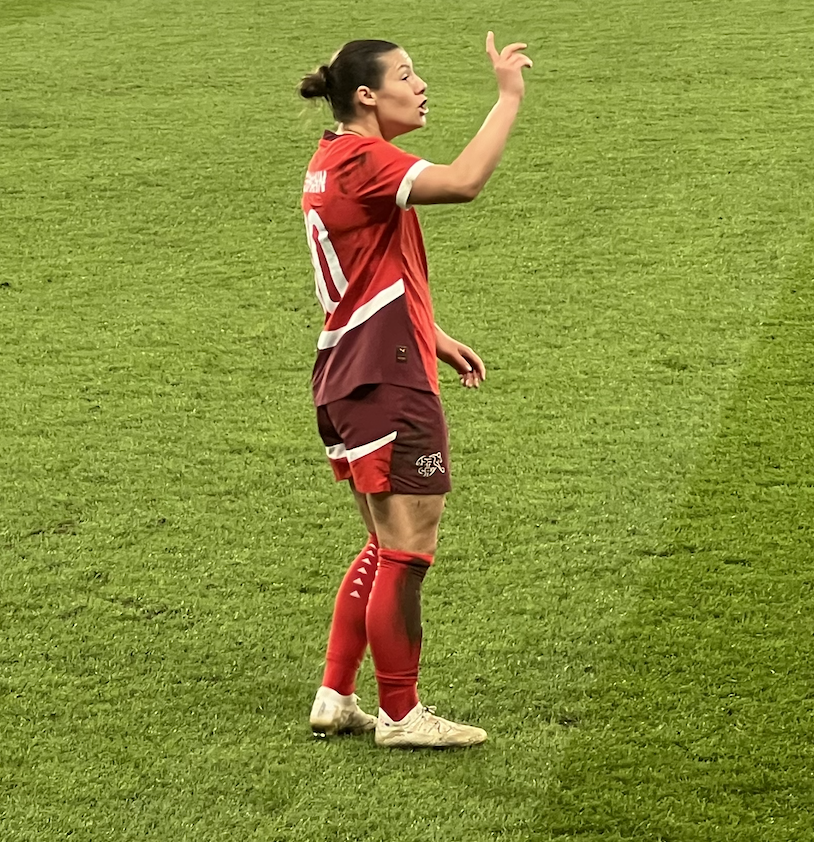
Bachmann with Switzerland in October 2024.

Bachmann's biggest achievement so far was the qualification for the 2015 FIFA Women's World Cup, in Canada. Switzerland had never before qualified for a World Cup. After winning their home game against Malta, the team was sitting in front of the TV watching the game between Denmark and Iceland. If it ended in a draw, the Swiss would secure the group's victory. As said by herself: "When it ended in a draw and it was certain we had won the group, we started dancing on the tables."

During the World cup, Switzerland reached the round of 16, with Bachmann scoring three times, all in a 10–1 victory over hapless Ecuador. The Swiss were edged out by hosts Canada, due to one goal by Josée Bélanger, just after the half-time break. After the World Cup, there were multiple clubs interested in the 24-year-old Bachmann, and she chose VfL Wolfsburg.

In Switzerland's opening 2023 FIFA Women's World Cup match against Philippines, Bachmann scored the opening goal for a 2–0 win.

On 12 June 2025, it was announced Bachmann had suffered an ACL injury and would miss the upcoming Euro 2025, being held in her home country.

== Personal life ==
Bachmann came out as lesbian during the 2015 FIFA Women's World Cup in Canada. She was previously in a relationship with fellow Swiss national team footballer Alisha Lehmann, who moved to London to play for West Ham United. Their national team coach Martina Voss-Tecklenburg explained: "The situation is not exceptional in women's football".

In 2023, she married French dance professor Charlotte Baret.

== Career statistics ==
Scores and results list Switzerland's goal tally first, score column indicates score after each Bachmann goal.

List of international goals scored by Ramona Bachmann
No.	Date	Venue	Opponent	Score	Result	Competition
1	26 February 2010	GSP Stadium, Nicosia, Cyprus	South Africa	1–0	3–1	2010 Cyprus Women's Cup
2	26 February 2010	GSP Stadium, Nicosia, Cyprus	South Africa	2–1	3–1	2010 Cyprus Women's Cup
3	19 June 2010	Krasnoarmeysk Stadium, Krasnoarmeysk, Russia	Russia	2–0	3–0	2011 FIFA Women's World Cup qualification
4	19 June 2010	Krasnoarmeysk Stadium, Krasnoarmeysk, Russia	Russia	3–0	3–0	2011 FIFA Women's World Cup qualification
5	23 June 2010	Shakhtyor Stadium, Karagandy, Kazakhstan	Kazakhstan	1–0	4–2	2011 FIFA Women's World Cup qualification
6	16 September 2010	Stadion Niedermatten, Wohlen, Switzerland	England	1–2	2–3	2011 FIFA Women's World Cup qualification – UEFA play-offs
7	17 September 2011	Impuls Arena, Augsburg, Germany	Germany	1–2	1–4	UEFA Women's Euro 2013 qualifying
8	21 September 2011	Stadion Brügglifeld, Aarau, Switzerland	Romania	2–1	4–1	UEFA Women's Euro 2013 qualifying
9	21 September 2011	Stadion Brügglifeld, Aarau, Switzerland	Romania	3–1	4–1	UEFA Women's Euro 2013 qualifying
10	23 October 2011	La Ciudad del Fútbol, Madrid, Spain	Spain	1–2	2–3	UEFA Women's Euro 2013 qualifying
11	24 November 2011	Stadion Brügglifeld, Aarau, Switzerland	Kazakhstan	6–1	8–1	UEFA Women's Euro 2013 qualifying
12	24 November 2011	Stadion Brügglifeld, Aarau, Switzerland	Kazakhstan	7–1	8–1	UEFA Women's Euro 2013 qualifying
13	31 March 2012	Stadion Brügglifeld, Aarau, Switzerland	Turkey	3–0	5–0	UEFA Women's Euro 2013 qualifying
14	16 June 2012	Stadion Brügglifeld, Aarau, Switzerland	Spain	1–0	4–3	UEFA Women's Euro 2013 qualifying
15	16 June 2012	Stadion Brügglifeld, Aarau, Switzerland	Spain	4–3	4–3	UEFA Women's Euro 2013 qualifying
16	15 September 2012	Atatürk Olympic Stadium, Istanbul, Turkey	Turkey	2–1	3–1	UEFA Women's Euro 2013 qualifying
17	15 September 2012	Atatürk Olympic Stadium, Istanbul, Turkey	Turkey	3–1	3–1	UEFA Women's Euro 2013 qualifying
18	8 March 2013	GSP Stadium, Nicosia, Cyprus	Netherlands	1–1	1–1	2013 Cyprus Women's Cup
19	11 March 2013	GSZ Stadium, Larnaca, Cyprus	Finland	1–0	3–2	2013 Cyprus Women's Cup
20	21 September 2013	Centre sportif de Colovray Nyon, Nyon, Switzerland	Serbia	1–0	9–0	2015 FIFA Women's World Cup qualification
21	21 September 2013	Centre sportif de Colovray Nyon, Nyon, Switzerland	Serbia	9–0	9–0	2015 FIFA Women's World Cup qualification
22	26 September 2013	Laugardalsvöllur, Reykjavík, Iceland	Iceland	1–0	2–0	2015 FIFA Women's World Cup qualification
23	31 October 2013	Vejle Stadium, Vejle, Denmark	Denmark	1–0	1–0	2015 FIFA Women's World Cup qualification
24	5 April 2014	Herti Allmend Stadion, Zug, Switzerland	Malta	1–0	11–0	2015 FIFA Women's World Cup qualification
25	14 June 2014	Stadion Niedermatten, Wohlen, Switzerland	Israel	3–0	9–0	2015 FIFA Women's World Cup qualification
26	14 June 2014	Stadion Niedermatten, Wohlen, Switzerland	Israel	5–0	9–0	2015 FIFA Women's World Cup qualification
27	19 June 2014	Inđija Stadium, Inđija, Serbia	Serbia	1–0	7–0	2015 FIFA Women's World Cup qualification
28	12 June 2015	BC Place, Vancouver, Canada	Ecuador	6–0	10–1	2015 FIFA Women's World Cup
29	12 June 2015	BC Place, Vancouver, Canada	Ecuador	7–0	10–1	2015 FIFA Women's World Cup
30	12 June 2015	BC Place, Vancouver, Canada	Ecuador	10–1	10–1	2015 FIFA Women's World Cup
31	24 October 2015	Stadio Dino Manuzzi, Cesena, Italy	Italy	1–0	3–0	UEFA Women's Euro 2017 qualifying
32	24 October 2015	Stadio Dino Manuzzi, Cesena, Italy	Italy	2–0	3–0	UEFA Women's Euro 2017 qualifying
33	1 December 2015	Stade de la Maladière, Neuchâtel, Switzerland	Czech Republic	3–0	5–1	UEFA Women's Euro 2017 qualifying
34	2 March 2016	Kyocera Stadion, Den Haag, Netherlands	Netherlands	2–4	3–4	2016 UEFA Women's Olympic Qualifying Tournament
35	9 April 2016	Tissot Arena, Biel/Bienne, Switzerland	Italy	1–0	2–1	UEFA Women's Euro 2017 qualifying
36	22 July 2017	De Vijverberg, Doetinchem, Netherlands	Iceland	2–1	2–1	UEFA Women's Euro 2017
37	15 September 2017	Elbasan Arena, Elbasan, Albania	Albania	2–0	4–1	2019 FIFA Women's World Cup qualification
38	28 November 2017	Tissot Arena, Biel/Bienne, Switzerland	Albania	2–1	5–1	2019 FIFA Women's World Cup qualification
39	3 September 2019	LIPO Park Schaffhausen, Schaffhausen, Switzerland	Lithuania	3–0	4–0	UEFA Women's Euro 2022 qualifying
40	12 November 2019	LIPO Park Schaffhausen, Schaffhausen, Switzerland	Romania	1–0	6–0	UEFA Women's Euro 2022 qualifying
41	12 November 2019	LIPO Park Schaffhausen, Schaffhausen, Switzerland	Romania	2–0	6–0	UEFA Women's Euro 2022 qualifying
42	12 November 2019	LIPO Park Schaffhausen, Schaffhausen, Switzerland	Romania	4–0	6–0	UEFA Women's Euro 2022 qualifying
43	18 September 2020	Ivan Laljak-Ivić Stadium, Zaprešić, Croatia	Croatia	1–1	1–1	UEFA Women's Euro 2022 qualifying
44	17 September 2021	Stockhorn Arena, Thun, Switzerland	Lithuania	3–1	4–1	2023 FIFA Women's World Cup qualification
45	26 October 2021	Letzigrund, Zürich, Switzerland	Croatia	3–0	5–0	2023 FIFA Women's World Cup qualification
46	26 October 2021	Letzigrund, Zürich, Switzerland	Croatia	5–0	5–0	2023 FIFA Women's World Cup qualification
47	20 February 2022	Marbella Football Center, Marbella, Spain	Northern Ireland	2–1	2–2	Friendly
48	13 July 2022	Bramall Lane, Sheffield, England	Sweden	1–1	1–2	UEFA Women's Euro 2022
49	2 September 2022	Stadion Branko Čavlović-Čavlek, Karlovac, Croatia	Croatia	1–0	2–0	2023 FIFA Women's World Cup qualification
50	6 September 2022	Stade de la Tuilière, Lausanne, Switzerland	Moldova	2–0	15–0	2023 FIFA Women's World Cup qualification
51	11 October 2022	Letzigrund, Zürich, Switzerland	Wales	1–1	2–1 (a.e.t.)	2023 FIFA Women's World Cup qualification – UEFA play-offs
52	21 July 2023	Forsyth Barr Stadium, Dunedin, New Zealand	Philippines	1–0	2–0	2023 FIFA Women's World Cup

== Honours ==
Umeå IK

- Damallsvenskan: 2007, 2008
- Svenska Cupen: 2007
- Svenska Supercupen: 2007, 2008

FC Rosengård

- Damallsvenskan: 2013, 2014, 2015
- Svenska Supercupen: 2012, 2015

VfL Wolfsburg

- DFB-Pokal: 2015–16

Chelsea

- FA Women's Super League: 2017–18, 2019–20
- FA WSL Spring Series: 2017
- Women's FA Cup: 2017–18
- FA Women's League Cup: 2019–20

Paris Saint-Germain

- Division 1 Féminine: 2020–21
- Coupe de France: 2021–22, 2023–24
