= Ana-Maria Crnogorčević =

Swiss footballer (born 1990)

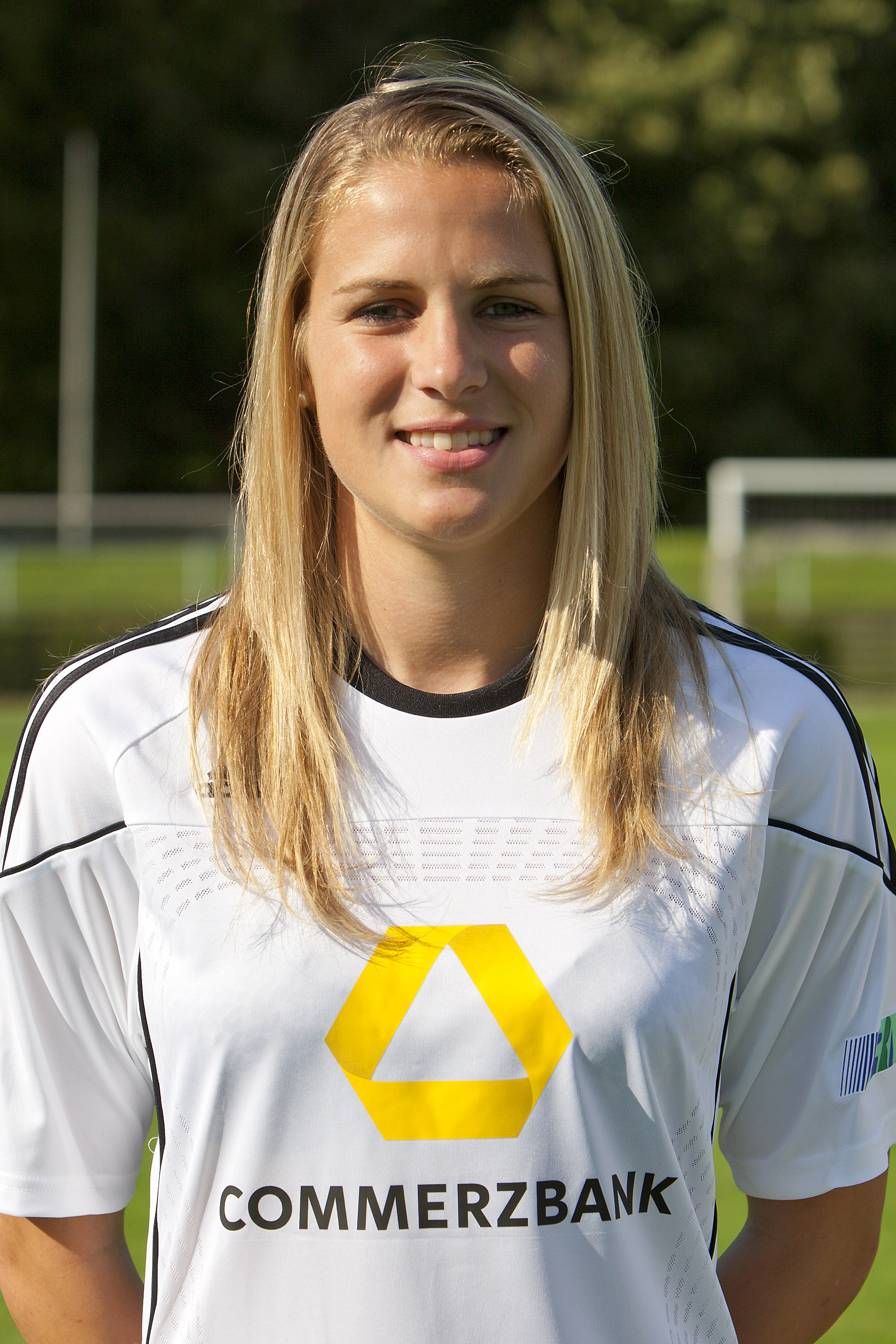
- Crnogorčević in 2011

Personal information
- Full name: Ana-Maria Crnogorčević
- Date of birth: 3 October 1990 (age 36)
- Place of birth: Steffisburg, Switzerland
- Height: 1.75 m (5 ft 9 in)
- Positions: Winger; right-back

Team information
- Current team: Strasbourg
- Number: 11

Youth career
- 2001–2004: FC Steffisburg

Senior career*
Years	Team	Apps	(Gls)
2004–2009	FC Rot-Schwarz Thun		
2009	FC Thun		
2009–2010	Hamburger SV	39	(13)
2011–2018	FFC Frankfurt	112	(21)
2018–2019	Portland Thorns	34	(6)
2019–2023	Barcelona	82	(17)
2023–2024	Atlético Madrid	18	(1)
2024–2025	Seattle Reign	22	(0)
2026–	Strasbourg	14	(1)

International career^{‡}
2005–2006	Switzerland U17	8	(0)
2006–2009	Switzerland U19	31	(25)
2009–	Switzerland	183	(75)
- * Club domestic league appearances and goals as of 00:41, 31 October 2026 (UTC) ‡ National team caps and goals as of 10 October 2026

Ana-Maria Crnogorčević (Croatian: [ˈana ˈmaːria t͡sr̩noɡoʊrt͡ʃeʋit͡ɕ]; born 3 October 1990) is a Swiss professional footballer who plays as a winger or right-back for Première Ligue club Strasbourg and the Switzerland national team. A fast player with good heading ability, she is considered one of Switzerland's most talented footballers.

== Early and personal life ==
Ana-Maria Crnogorčević was born on 3 October 1990 in Steffisburg, by Lake Thun in the Bernese Oberland of Switzerland, to Croat parents from Ruma, in Vojvodina, with origins in Drniš, Croatia. She has dual nationality and considers herself both Swiss and Croatian; her first language was Croatian. She speaks many languages and received scorn from some rival fans while playing for Barcelona and responding in Catalan to a question asked in Spanish. Crnogorčević has a sister and was raised Catholic.

== Club career ==
Crnogorčević began her club career with FC Steffisburg at age 11. In 2004, she moved to FC Rot-Schwarz Thun, then later to FC Thun. In 2009, she helped Rot-Schwarz win the Swiss Cup final. Crnogorčević scored a hat-trick in the 8–0 win over FC Schlieren. She was the top-scorer with 24 goals in 16 games in the Nationalliga A. In September 2009 she joined German Bundesliga team Hamburger SV. She made her debut for HSV on 27 September, scoring in a 3–2 win against SG Essen-Schönebeck. Crnogorčević finished her first season in Germany with eight goals from 19 appearances. For the 2011–12 season she moved to 1. FFC Frankfurt, with which she won the Champions League in 2015.

She signed with Portland Thorns FC ahead of the 2018 National Women's Soccer League season. In December 2019, Crnogorčević signed with Barcelona. She won the Champions League with Barcelona in the 2020–21 and 2022–23 seasons.

On 5 August 2024, Seattle Reign FC announced that they had signed Crnogorčević from Spanish club Atlético Madrid through the 2025 season for an undisclosed transfer fee. Crnogorčević made her debut for the club on 25 August 2024, starting and playing 75 minutes in a 1–0 victory against North Carolina Courage. She made 22 league appearances across two seasons before departing from the Reign at the end of 2025.

In January 2026, Crnogorčević signed a contract with French club Strasbourg through 2027, reconnecting with Swiss national team compatriat Eseosa Aigbogun.

== International career ==
=== Youth ===
Aged 17, she scored 25 goals in 29 games for the Switzerland U19 team. At the 2009 UEFA U19 Championship in Belarus, she reached the semi-final with her team. She was selected in the U20 for the 2012 U20 World Cup in Japan. She played in all three matches but was eliminated in the group stage.

=== Senior ===
Crnogorčević was approached to play for Croatia when she was 17; though raised with Croatian culture, she always wanted to play for Switzerland.

On 12 August 2009, she made her debut for the Swiss senior team in a friendly against Sweden. In August 2010, she scored five goals in an 8–0 World Cup qualifying win over Kazakhstan.

Crnogorčević succeeded with the Swiss national team in qualifying for the 2017 European Championship in the Netherlands, where she was top scorer with seven goals. On 4 June 2016, she surpassed previous Swiss all-time goalscorer Lara Dickenmann by adding two goals in a qualifier against the Czech Republic. At the European Championship, she scored a goal in the 1–1 draw with France, but her team was eliminated after the group stage. In the subsequent qualification for the 2019 World Cup, she scored two goals in eleven games. However, the Swiss did not qualify this time because they lost in the last play-off round against European champions Netherlands.

On 13 April 2021, she converted her team's last penalty to 3–2 in the second leg of qualifying play-off for the Euro 2022 against the Czech Republic, succeeding in qualifying for the Euro finals. In the first leg, she scored the goal for the 1–1 equaliser with a penalty in the 90th minute. In all, she scored six goals in qualifying, once again being her team's top scorer.

On 30 June 2022, Crnogorčević matched Lara Dickenmann's national cap record with her 135th international match in the 4–0 defeat in the European Championship preparatory game against England. At the European Championship in 2022, she played in all three group games in the starting line-up. Switzerland was eliminated after the preliminary round.

On 23 June 2025, Crnogorčević was called up to the Switzerland squad for the UEFA Women's Euro 2025.

== Career statistics ==
=== Club ===
As of match played 24 October 2026

Appearances and goals by club, season and competition
Club	Season	League			National cup (Note: Includes DFB-Pokal Frauen, Copa de la Reina, Coupe de France Féminine)		Continental		Other		Total	
Club	Season	Division	Apps	Goals	Apps	Goals	Apps	Goals	Apps	Goals	Apps	Goals
Hamburger SV	2009–10	Frauen-Bundesliga	19	8	1	0	—		—		20	8
Hamburger SV	2010–11	Frauen-Bundesliga	20	6	2	2	—		4 (Note: Appearances in Women's Bundesliga Cup)	1	126	9
Hamburger SV	Total		39	14	2	2	—		4	1	46	17
FFC Frankfurt	2011–12	Frauen-Bundesliga	15	8	3	2	8 (Note: Appearances in UEFA Women's Champions League)	3	—		26	13
FFC Frankfurt	2012–13	Frauen-Bundesliga	15	2	0	0	—		—		15	2
FFC Frankfurt	2013–14	Frauen-Bundesliga	22	4	5	1	—		—		27	5
FFC Frankfurt	2014–15	Frauen-Bundesliga	20	1	3	0	9	0	—		32	1
FFC Frankfurt	2015–16	Frauen-Bundesliga	18	0	2	0	7	1	—		27	1
FFC Frankfurt	2016–17	Frauen-Bundesliga	12	4	1	0	—		—		13	4
FFC Frankfurt	2017–18	Frauen-Bundesliga	14	2	3	0	—		—		17	2
FFC Frankfurt	Total		116	21	17	3	24	4	—		157	28
Portland Thorns FC	2018	NWSL	22	5	—		—		—		22	5
Portland Thorns FC	2019	NWSL	12	1	—		—		—		12	1
Portland Thorns FC	Total		34	6	—		—		—		34	6
Barcelona	2019–20	Primera División	6	0	3	0	0	0	2 (Note: Appearance(s) in Supercopa de España)	0	11	0
Barcelona	2020–21	Primera División	27	4	2	0	5	0	1	0	35	4
Barcelona	2021–22	Primera División	20	5	2	1	9	1	0	0	31	7
Barcelona	2022–23	Primera División	29	8	0	0	9	2	2	0	40	10
Barcelona	Total		82	17	7	1	23	3	5	0	117	21
Atlético Madrid	2023–24	Liga F	14	1	3	0	—		1	0	18	1
Seattle Reign	2024	NWSL	10	0	—		—		—		10	0
Seattle Reign	2025	NWSL	12	0	—		—		—		12	0
Seattle Reign	Total		22	0	—		—		—		22	0
Strasbourg	2025–26	Première Ligue	8	0	2	0	—		0	0	10	0
Strasbourg	2026–27	Première Ligue	6	1	0	0	—		0	0	6	1
Strasbourg	Total		14	1	2	0	—		0	0	16	1
Career total			321	60	32	6	47	7	10	1	410	74

=== International goals ===
Scores and results list Switzerland's goal tally first, score column indicates score after each Crnogorčević goal.

List of international goals scored by Ana-Maria Crnogorčević
No.	Date	Venue	Opponent	Score	Result	Competition
1	27 March 2010	Stadion Niedermatten, Wohlen, Switzerland	Israel	6–0	6–0	2011 FIFA Women's World Cup qualification
2	21 August 2010	Stade Universitaire Saint-Léonard, Fribourg, Switzerland	Kazakhstan	1–0	8–0	2011 FIFA Women's World Cup qualification
3	21 August 2010	Stade Universitaire Saint-Léonard, Fribourg, Switzerland	Kazakhstan	4–0	8–0	2011 FIFA Women's World Cup qualification
4	21 August 2010	Stade Universitaire Saint-Léonard, Fribourg, Switzerland	Kazakhstan	5–0	8–0	2011 FIFA Women's World Cup qualification
5	21 August 2010	Stade Universitaire Saint-Léonard, Fribourg, Switzerland	Kazakhstan	7–0	8–0	2011 FIFA Women's World Cup qualification
6	21 August 2010	Stade Universitaire Saint-Léonard, Fribourg, Switzerland	Kazakhstan	8–0	8–0	2011 FIFA Women's World Cup qualification
7	3 October 2010	Vejle Stadion, Vejle, Denmark	Denmark	1–0	3–1	2011 FIFA Women's World Cup qualification – UEFA play-offs
8	21 September 2011	Stadion Brügglifeld, Aarau, Switzerland	Romania	1–0	4–1	UEFA Women's Euro 2013 qualifying
9	21 September 2011	Stadion Brügglifeld, Aarau, Switzerland	Romania	4–1	4–1	UEFA Women's Euro 2013 qualifying
10	4 March 2012	Paralimni Stadium, Paralimni, Cyprus	Finland	1–3	1–3	2012 Cyprus Women's Cup
11	6 March 2012	Ammochostos Stadium, Larnaca, Cyprus	Northern Ireland	1–0	5–0	2012 Cyprus Women's Cup
12	6 March 2012	Ammochostos Stadium, Larnaca, Cyprus	Northern Ireland	4–0	5–0	2012 Cyprus Women's Cup
13	31 March 2012	Stadion Brügglifeld, Aarau, Switzerland	Turkey	4–0	5–0	UEFA Women's Euro 2013 qualifying
14	16 June 2012	Stadion Brügglifeld, Aarau, Switzerland	Spain	2–2	4–3	UEFA Women's Euro 2013 qualifying
15	21 June 2012	Stadionul CNAF, Buftea, Romania	Romania	1–0	2–4	UEFA Women's Euro 2013 qualifying
16	13 March 2013	GSZ Stadium, Larnaca, Cyprus	New Zealand	1–0	1–2	2013 Cyprus Women's Cup
17	6 April 2013	Centre sportif de Colovray Nyon, Nyon, Switzerland	Norway	2–0	3–1	Friendly
18	6 April 2013	Centre sportif de Colovray Nyon, Nyon, Switzerland	Norway	3–1	3–1	Friendly
19	21 September 2013	Centre sportif de Colovray Nyon, Nyon, Switzerland	Serbia	2–0	9–0	2015 FIFA Women's World Cup qualification
20	21 September 2013	Centre sportif de Colovray Nyon, Nyon, Switzerland	Serbia	5–0	9–0	2015 FIFA Women's World Cup qualification
21	21 September 2013	Centre sportif de Colovray Nyon, Nyon, Switzerland	Serbia	7–0	9–0	2015 FIFA Women's World Cup qualification
22	21 September 2013	Centre sportif de Colovray Nyon, Nyon, Switzerland	Serbia	9–0	9–0	2015 FIFA Women's World Cup qualification
23	14 January 2014	Estádio do Marítimo, Funchal, Portugal	Portugal	2–1	2–1	Friendly
24	16 January 2014	Estádio Municipal de Machico, Machico, Portugal	Portugal	1–0	2–1	Friendly
25	12 February 2014	HaMoshava Stadium, Petah Tikva, Israel	Israel	5–0	5–0	2015 FIFA Women's World Cup qualification
26	12 March 2014	GSZ Stadium, Larnaca, Cyprus	Netherlands	1–1	1–4	2014 Cyprus Women's Cup
27	19 June 2014	Inđija Stadium, Inđija, Serbia	Serbia	5–0	7–0	2015 FIFA Women's World Cup qualification
28	20 August 2014	WakeMed Soccer Park, Cary, United States	United States	1–2	1–4	Friendly
29	17 September 2014	Victor Tedesco Stadium, Ħamrun, Malta	Malta	1–0	5–0	2015 FIFA Women's World Cup qualification
30	17 September 2014	Victor Tedesco Stadium, Ħamrun, Malta	Malta	4–0	5–0	2015 FIFA Women's World Cup qualification
31	17 September 2014	Victor Tedesco Stadium, Ħamrun, Malta	Malta	5–0	5–0	2015 FIFA Women's World Cup qualification
32	27 May 2015	Esp Stadium, Baden, Switzerland	Germany	1–0	1–3	Friendly
33	16 June 2015	Commonwealth Stadium, Edmonton, Canada	Cameroon	1–0	1–2	2015 FIFA Women's World Cup
34	22 September 2015	Tissot Arena, Biel/Bienne, Switzerland	Denmark	1–0	4–1	Friendly
35	22 September 2015	Tissot Arena, Biel/Bienne, Switzerland	Denmark	4–1	4–1	Friendly
36	24 October 2015	Stadio Dino Manuzzi, Cesena, Italy	Italy	3–0	3–0	UEFA Women's Euro 2017 qualifying
37	27 October 2015	Tissot Arena, Biel/Bienne, Switzerland	Georgia	2–0	4–0	UEFA Women's Euro 2017 qualifying
38	27 November 2015	Mourneview Park, Lurgan, Northern Ireland	Northern Ireland	6–1	8–1	UEFA Women's Euro 2017 qualifying
39	1 December 2015	Stade de la Maladière, Neuchâtel, Switzerland	Czech Republic	4–0	5–1	UEFA Women's Euro 2017 qualifying
40	4 June 2016	Stadion Střelnice, Jablonec nad Nisou, Czech Republic	Czech Republic	3–0	5–0	UEFA Women's Euro 2017 qualifying
41	4 June 2016	Stadion Střelnice, Jablonec nad Nisou, Czech Republic	Czech Republic	4–0	5–0	UEFA Women's Euro 2017 qualifying
42	15 September 2016	Tengiz Burjanadze Stadium, Gori, Georgia	Georgia	1–0	3–0	UEFA Women's Euro 2017 qualifying
43	6 March 2017	Ammochostos Stadium, Larnaca, Cyprus	Italy	5–0	6–0	2017 Cyprus Women's Cup
44	6 March 2017	Ammochostos Stadium, Larnaca, Cyprus	Italy	6–0	6–0	2017 Cyprus Women's Cup
45	26 July 2017	Rat Verlegh Stadion, Breda, Netherlands	France	1–1	1–1	UEFA Women's Euro 2017
46	15 September 2017	Elbasan Arena, Elbasan, Albania	Albania	3–0	4–1	2019 FIFA Women's World Cup qualification
47	2 March 2018	GSZ Stadium, Larnaca, Cyprus	Finland	3–0	4–0	2018 Cyprus Women's Cup
48	12 June 2018	FC Minsk Stadium, Minsk, Belarus	Belarus	1–0	5–0	2019 FIFA Women's World Cup qualification
49	27 February 2019	Estádio Algarve, Algarve, Portugal	Sweden	1–1	1–4	2019 Algarve Cup
50	4 March 2019	VRS António Sports Complex, Vila Real de Santo António, Portugal	Portugal	1–1	3–1	2019 Algarve Cup
51	3 September 2019	LIPO Park Schaffhausen, Schaffhausen, Switzerland	Lithuania	4–0	4–0	UEFA Women's Euro 2022 qualifying
52	4 October 2019	Savivaldybė Stadium, Šiauliai, Lithuania	Lithuania	1–0	3–0	UEFA Women's Euro 2022 qualifying
53	8 October 2019	Stockhorn Arena, Thun, Switzerland	Croatia	1–0	2–0	UEFA Women's Euro 2022 qualifying
54	12 November 2019	LIPO Park Schaffhausen, Schaffhausen, Switzerland	Romania	3–0	6–0	UEFA Women's Euro 2022 qualifying
55	10 March 2020	Estadio Municipal de Marbella, Marbella, Spain	Austria	1–0	2–1	Friendly
56	10 March 2020	Estadio Municipal de Marbella, Marbella, Spain	Austria	2–1	2–1	Friendly
57	27 October 2020	Football Centre FRF, Mogoșoaia, Romania	Romania	2–0	2–0	UEFA Women's Euro 2022 qualifying
58	9 April 2021	Letní stadion, Chomutov, Czech Republic	Czech Republic	1–1	1–1	UEFA Women's Euro 2022 qualifying play-offs
59	21 September 2021	Zimbru Stadium, Chișinău, Moldova	Moldova	1–0	6–0	2023 FIFA Women's World Cup qualification
60	22 October 2021	Letzigrund, Zürich, Switzerland	Romania	1–0	2–0	2023 FIFA Women's World Cup qualification
61	22 October 2021	Letzigrund, Zürich, Switzerland	Romania	2–0	2–0	2023 FIFA Women's World Cup qualification
62	26 October 2021	Letzigrund, Zürich, Switzerland	Croatia	1–0	5–0	2023 FIFA Women's World Cup qualification
63	26 November 2021	Stadio Renzo Barbera, Palermo, Italy	Italy	2–0	2–1	2023 FIFA Women's World Cup qualification
64	30 November 2021	LFF Stadium, Vilnius, Lithuania	Lithuania	4–0	7–0	2023 FIFA Women's World Cup qualification
65	6 September 2022	Stade de la Tuilière, Lausanne, Switzerland	Moldova	10–0	15–0	2023 FIFA Women's World Cup qualification
66	6 September 2022	Stade de la Tuilière, Lausanne, Switzerland	Moldova	13–0	15–0	2023 FIFA Women's World Cup qualification
67	30 June 2023	Tissot Arena, Biel/Bienne, Switzerland	Zambia	1–0	3–3	Friendly
68	1 December 2023	Swissporarena, Lucerne, Switzerland	Sweden	1–0	1–0	2023–24 UEFA Women's Nations League
69	12 July 2024	Kocaeli Stadium, İzmit, Turkey	Turkey	2–0	2–0	UEFA Women's Euro 2025 qualifying
70	16 July 2024	Stade Olympique de la Pontaise, Lausanne, Switzerland	Azerbaijan	3–0	3–0	UEFA Women's Euro 2025 qualifying
71	18 April 2026	Sinop Sehir Stadyumu, Sinop, Turkey	Turkey	1–0	1–1	2027 FIFA Women's World Cup qualification

== Honours ==
FC Rot-Schwarz Thun

- Swiss Cup: 2009

FFC Frankfurt

- DFB-Pokal: 2013–14
- UEFA Women's Champions League: 2014–15

Barcelona

- Primera División: 2019–20, 2020–21, 2021–22, 2022–23
- UEFA Women's Champions League: 2020–21, 2022–23, runner-up: 2021–22
- Copa de la Reina: 2019–20, 2020–21, 2021–22
- Supercopa Femenina: 2019–20, 2021–22, 2022–23

Individual

- Swiss Nationalliga A top scorer: 2009
