= Malin Gut =

Swiss footballer (born 2000)

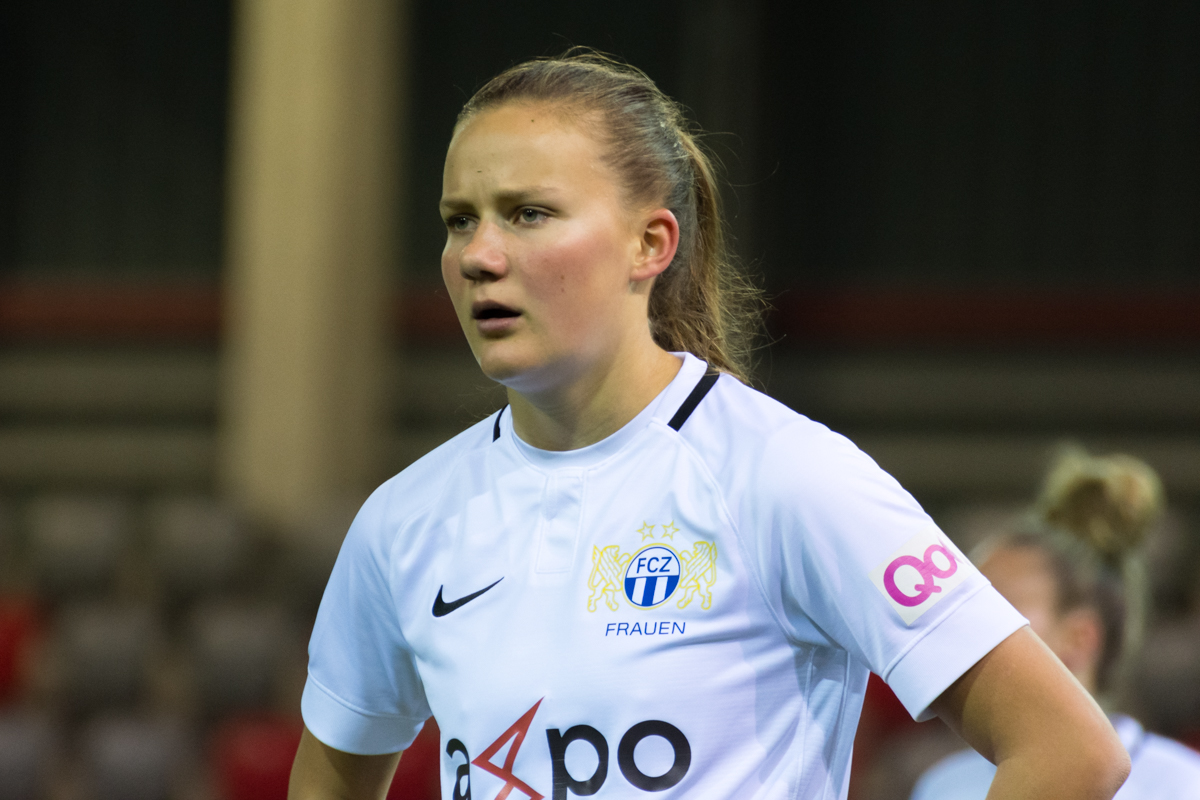
- Gut in 2018

Personal information
- Full name: Malin Jaya Gut
- Date of birth: 1 August 2000 (age 26)
- Place of birth: Lenzburg, Switzerland
- Position: Midfielder

Team information
- Current team: Grasshopper

Youth career
- FC Fislisbach
- FC Baden

Senior career*
Years	Team	Apps	(Gls)
2015-2019	FC Zürich	63	(17)
2019–2020	Grasshopper	15	(4)
2020–2022	Arsenal	16	(0)
2022	Grasshopper	0	(0)

International career^{‡}
2018–	Switzerland	14	(1)
- * Club domestic league appearances and goals as of 23 October 2022 ‡ National team caps and goals as of 23 October 2022

Malin Jaya Gut (Lenzburg, Switzerland, 1 August 2000) is a Swiss professional footballer who most recently played as a midfielder for Swiss Women's Super League club Grasshopper.

Gut has currently got 14 caps for Switzerland. In August 2022, Gut announced that she would take a break from football for at least one season. She said that she lost joy in her life as a professional.

== Club career ==
Gut played youth football with FC Fislisbach and FC Baden. At the age of 15, she started her professional career with FC Zürich. In July 2020, Gut signed for Arsenal. She made her Arsenal debut on 6 September 2020 when being subbed on for the last 15 minutes in their opening game versus Reading. On 28 January 2022, Gut completed a transfer to Grasshopper, following an ACL injury that sidelined her for the previous eight months.

== International career ==
Gut has been capped for the Switzerland national team, appearing for the team during the 2019 FIFA Women's World Cup qualification and the UEFA Women's Euro 2022 qualification.

== Career statistics ==
=== With Arsenal ===
As of 28 January 2022.

Club	Season	League			FA Cup		League Cup		Total	
Club	Season	Division	Apps	Goals	Apps	Goals	Apps	Goals	Apps	Goals
Arsenal	2020-21	FA WSL	16	0	2	0	2	0	20	0
Arsenal	2021-22	FA WSL	0	0	0	0	0	0	0	0
