= 2019–20 Promotion League =

Swiss Promotion League
- Season: 2019–2020
- Champions: None
- Promoted: None
- Relegated: None
- Matches: 136

The 2019–20 Promotion League season was the 8th edition (the 6th since its name change). The Promotion League is the 3rd division of Swiss Football and the third highest level of the football hierarchy in Switzerland, behind the Super League and the Challenge League. The Championship had 16 teams and each team were to play 30 games in a round robin format.

== Corona ==
The season started as normal, but due to the coronavirus and the measures against the illness, suddenly things changed. On 28 February the Swiss Football League postponed all Super and Challenge League matches. The postponement came after the Swiss Federal Council banned all major events until 15 March due to the COVID-19 outbreak. Due to the coronavirus measures, the start of the second half of the Promotion League season, planned for the end of February 2020, was postponed. On 30 April the Swiss Football Association decided that all suspended championship and cup competitions in Switzerland will be cancelled (with the exception of the Super League, the Challenge League and the Swiss Cup). This meant that all competitions in the lower tiers (Promotion League, 1st League, qualification for the Swiss Cup for the next 2020/2021 season) have been cancelled. They were not counted and there were no promotions or relegations.

== Teams ==
In the previous season Stade Lausanne Ouchy became division champions and had been promoted. La Chaux-de-Fonds had ended the season in last position and Wohlen in second last position and they were both relegated. Therefore, the 2019–20 season saw three new clubs join the division, FC Black Stars Basel and Étoile Carouge FC had both been promoted from the 1. Liga Classic and Rapperswil-Jona joined the division, after suffering relegation from the 2018–19 Swiss Challenge League.

Club	Canton	Stadium	Capacity
Basel U-21	Basel-City	Stadion Rankhof or Youth Campus Basel	7,000; 1,000
FC Bavois	Vaud	Terrain des Peupliers	659
AC Bellinzona	Ticino	Stadio Comunale Bellinzona	5,000
FC Black Stars Basel	Basel-City	Buschwilerhof	1,200
FC Breitenrain Bern	Bern	Spitalacker	1,450
SC Brühl	St. Gallen	Paul-Grüninger-Stadion	4,200
SC Cham	Zug	Stadion Eizmoos	1,800
Étoile Carouge FC	Geneva	Stade de la Fontenette	3,690
FC Köniz	Bern	Liebefeld	1,000
FC Münsingen	Bern	Sportanlage Sandreutenen	1,400
FC Stade Nyonnais	Vaud	Stade de Colovray	7,200
Rapperswil-Jona	St. Gallen	Stadion Grünfeld	2,500
Sion U-21	Valais	Stade de Tourbillon	20,200
SC Young Fellows Juventus	Zürich	Utogrund	2,850
Yverdon-Sport FC	Vaud	Stade Municipal	8,200
Zürich U-21	Zürich	Sportplatz Heerenschürli	1,120

== League table ==
Pos	Team	Pld	W	D	L	GF	GA	GD	Pts	Qualification or relegation
1	Yverdon-Sport	17	11	5	1	45	15	+30	38	No promotion
2	Rapperswil-Jona	17	9	4	4	31	24	+7	31	
3	Stade Nyonnais	17	9	3	5	37	21	+16	30	
4	Étoile Carouge FC	17	8	6	3	35	22	+13	30	
5	Black Stars	17	8	5	4	26	19	+7	29	
6	Bellinzona	17	8	3	6	33	24	+9	27	
7	Brühl	17	8	2	7	31	33	−2	26	
8	Basel U-21	17	5	7	5	21	18	+3	22	
9	Breitenrain	17	6	4	7	32	33	−1	22	
10	Sion U-21	17	6	2	9	21	25	−4	20	
11	Köniz	17	6	2	9	22	38	−16	20	
12	SC Cham	17	4	7	6	22	30	−8	19	
13	Zürich U-21	17	4	6	7	25	31	−6	18	
14	Bavois	17	3	7	7	21	35	−14	16	
15	YF Juventus	17	3	6	8	24	35	−11	15	No relegation
16	Münsingen	17	2	3	12	19	42	−23	9	No relegation

Source: RSSSF
Rules for classification: 1) Points; 2) Goal difference; 3) Goals scored; 4) Head-to-head points; 5) Away goals scored; 6) Draw.

NB: the season was abandoned due to the COVID-19 pandemic; there were no promotions or relegations
