= List of Swiss football transfers summer 2017 =

This is a list of Swiss football transfers for the 2017 summer transfer window. Only transfers featuring Swiss Super League are listed.

== Swiss Super League ==
=== Basel ===
In:

No.	Pos.	Nation	Player
--	MF	SRB	Veljko Simić (loan return from Chiasso)
--	FW	SUI	Nicolas Hunziker (loan return from Grasshopper)
--	DF	SUI	Eray Cümart (loan return from Lugano)
--	FW	NED	Jean-Paul Boëtius (loan return from (Belgium) Genk)
9	FW	NED	Ricky van Wolfswinkel (from (Netherlands) Vitesse)
13	GK	SUI	Mirko Salvi (loan return from Lugano)
19	FW	SUI	Dimitri Oberlin (on loan from (Austria) Red Bull Salzburg)
22	MF	SRB	Zdravko Kuzmanović (loan return from Málaga on 30 June 2017)
27	FW	SUI	Neftali Manzambi (from Basel U21)
31	MF	SUI	Dominik Schmid (from Basel U21)
35	DF	POR	Pedro Pacheco (from Basel U21)
37	FW	FRA	Afimico Pululu (from Basel U21)

Out:

No.	Pos.	Nation	Player
--	MF	SRB	Veljko Simić (released)
--	FW	NED	Jean-Paul Boëtius (to (Netherlands) Feyenoord)
--	FW	SUI	Nicolas Hunziker (to Thun)
--	DF	SUI	Eray Cümart (on loan to FC Sion)
--	MF	SUI	Robin Huser (on loan to Winterthur)
3	DF	CIV	Adama Traoré (to (Turkey) Göztepe)
9	FW	SVN	Andraž Šporar (on loan to (Germany) Arminia Bielefeld)
10	MF	ARG	Matías Delgado (retired)
13	GK	SRB	Đorđe Nikolić (on loan to Schaffhausen)
20	MF	SUI	Dereck Kutesa (on loan to Luzern)
21	FW	AUT	Marc Janko (to (Czech Republic) Sparta Prague)
22	MF	SRB	Zdravko Kuzmanović (on loan at Málaga until 30 June 2018)
26	DF	DEN	Daniel Høegh (to (Netherlands) Heerenveen)
88	FW	CIV	Seydou Doumbia (loan return to (Italy) Roma)

=== Grasshopper Club Zürich ===
In:

No.	Pos.	Nation	Player
--	DF	SUI	Noah Loosli (loan return from Wohlen)
1	GK	AUT	Heinz Lindner (from (Germany) Eintracht Frankfurt)
9	FW	AUT	Marco Djuricin (on loan from (Austria) Red Bull Salzburg)
15	DF	CIV	Souleyman Doumbia (on loan from (Italy) Bari)
16	FW	VEN	Jeffrén (from (Belgium) Eupen)
17	MF	SVK	Michal Faško (from (Slovakia) Ružomberok)
19	FW	SUI	Florian Kamberi (loan return from (Germany) Karlsruher SC)
21	FW	SWE	Nabil Bahoui (from (Germany) Hamburger SV)
27	GK	ANG	Joao Ngongo (from Rapperswil-Jona)
31	FW	ALB	Albion Avdijaj (from (Liechtenstein) Vaduz)
32	MF	KOS	Valon Fazliu (from Grasshopper U21)

Out:

No.	Pos.	Nation	Player
--	MF	SUI	Manuel Kubli (to Rapperswil-Jona, previously on loan)
--	DF	SUI	Noah Loosli (on loan to Schaffhausen)
3	DF	SRB	Nemanja Antonov (on loan to (Serbia) Partizan)
9	FW	ISR	Mu'nas Dabbur (loan return to (Austria) Red Bull Salzburg)
17	FW	SUI	Nicolas Hunziker (loan return to Basel)
18	GK	SUI	Joël Mall (to (Germany) SV Darmstadt 98)
19	FW	SUI	Haris Tabaković (to (Hungary) Debreceni)
21	MF	BRA	Caio (to (Israel) Maccabi Haifa)
24	DF	SUI	Jan Bamert (to FC Sion)
25	MF	IRQ	Sherko Karim (on loan to (Liechtenstein) Vaduz)
26	FW	DEN	Patrick Olsen (released)
27	GK	SUI	Gion Chande (loan return to Basel U21)
35	FW	MKD	Nikola Gjorgjev (on loan to (Netherlands) Twente)

=== Lausanne ===
In:

No.	Pos.	Nation	Player
--	DF	SUI	Jetmir Krasniqi (loan return from Le Mont)
3	DF	SRB	David Hrubik (from Lausanne U21)
5	DF	SUI	Alain Rochat (from Young Boys)
8	MF	SUI	Joël Geissmann (from Thun)
10	FW	ARG	Gonzalo Zárate (from (Liechtenstein) Vaduz)
15	DF	ARG	Leandro Marín (from (Argentina) Boca Juniors)
21	DF	ALG	Djamel Mesbah (from (Italy) Crotone)
23	MF	SUI	Ali Kabacalman (from Lausanne U21)
25	MF	SUI	Marco Delley (from Servette)
27	MF	SUI	Mersim Asllani (from Lausanne U21)
29	FW	SUI	Andi Zeqiri (loan return from (Italy) Juventus U19)
35	GK	SUI	Diego Berchtold (from Thun U21)
86	FW	BUL	Valeri Bojinov (from (China) Meizhou Hakka)

Out:

No.	Pos.	Nation	Player
--	DF	SUI	Jetmir Krasniqi (to Chiasso)
3	DF	ESP	Carlos Blanco (loan return to (Italy) Juventus)
5	MF	SUI	Xavier Margairaz (released)
8	MF	SUI	Musa Araz (to (Turkey) Konyaspor)
10	FW	URU	Kevin Méndez (loan return to (Italy) Roma)
12	DF	BRA	Marcus Diniz (to (Israel) Ironi Kiryat Shmona)
13	DF	ITA	Paolo Frascatore (loan return to (Italy) Roma)
15	FW	ESP	Juan Esnáider (to (Spain) Mérida)
17	MF	SUI	Olivier Custodio (to Luzern)
21	MF	SUI	Ming-yang Yang (to Winterthur)
23	DF	SUI	Jordan Lotomba (to Young Boys)
24	DF	FRA	Xavier Tomas (to (Scotland) Hamilton Academical)
25	FW	SUI	Nassim Ben Khalifa (to St. Gallen)
33	DF	NGA	Taye Taiwo (released)
35	GK	SUI	Dany da Silva (to Yverdon)

=== Lugano ===
In:

No.	Pos.	Nation	Player
--	DF	NGA	Stanley Amuzie (on loan from (Italy) Sampdoria)
--	DF	ITA	Luca Crescenzi (from (Italy) Pisa)
--	MF	SUI	Eris Abedini (from Lugano U21)
1	GK	SUI	David Da Costa (from (Italy) Novara)
2	DF	ITA	Cristian Andreoni (free agent)
6	DF	CRO	Dominik Kovačić (from (Croatia) Zagreb)
7	FW	MAR	Younes Bnou Marzouk (from (Italy) Juventus)
12	DF	SUI	Silvano Schäppi (from Wil)
18	MF	ITA	Mario Piccinocchi (from (Italy) Vicenza, previously on loan)
21	MF	SRB	Radomir Milosavljević (from (Serbia) Mladost Lučani)
23	GK	COD	Joel Kiassumbua (from Wohlen)
34	MF	SUI	Stefano Guidotti (from Team Ticino U18)
95	FW	ITA	Carlos Manicone (from (Italy) Empoli U19)
96	DF	CIV	Yao Eloge Koffi (from (Italy) Internazionale)

Out:

No.	Pos.	Nation	Player
--	MF	SUI	Eris Abedini (on loan to Chiasso)
--	DF	ITA	Luca Crescenzi (on loan to (Italy) Vicenza)
2	DF	SUI	Simone Belometti (to Chiasso, previously on loan)
6	DF	ITA	Orlando Urbano (to Chiasso)
7	MF	MKD	Ezgjan Alioski (to (England) Leeds United)
8	MF	ISR	Ofir Mizrahi (to (Israel) Maccabi Haifa)
10	FW	ALB	Armando Sadiku (loan return to Zürich)
13	DF	SUI	Eray Cümart (loan return to Basel)
15	MF	EQG	Pepín (loan return to (Italy) Roma)
19	MF	SUI	Antoine Rey (to Chiasso)
23	GK	SUI	Mirko Salvi (loan return to Basel)
27	FW	ITA	Lorenzo Rosseti (loan return to (Italy) Juventus)
29	FW	GAM	Assan Ceesay (on loan to Chiasso)
30	GK	ITA	Francesco Russo (on loan to Chiasso)
92	DF	SUI	Bruno Martignoni (on loan to Chiasso)
99	FW	VEN	Andrés Ponce (loan return to (Italy) Sampdoria)

=== Luzern ===
In:

No.	Pos.	Nation	Player
8	MF	SUI	Olivier Custodio (from Lausanne)
10	MF	SUI	Daniel Follonier (from Sion)
13	FW	PRK	Jong Il-gwan (from (North Korea) Rimyongsu)
14	DF	SUI	Nicolas Schindelholz (from Thun)
15	DF	GER	Marvin Schulz (from (Germany) Borussia Mönchengladbach)
20	FW	SUI	Shkelqim Demhasaj (from Schaffhausen)
22	GK	SUI	Simon Enzler (from Luzern U21)
24	FW	SUI	Ruben Vargas (from Luzern U21)
25	DF	SUI	Yannick Schmid (loan return from Wohlen)
27	DF	SUI	Christian Schwegler (from (Austria) Red Bull Salzburg)
36	MF	GER	Dren Feka (from (Germany) Hamburger SV II)
42	MF	ALB	Idriz Voca (from Luzern U21)
68	MF	SUI	Francisco Rodríguez (from (Germany) VfL Wolfsburg, previously on loan)

Out:

No.	Pos.	Nation	Player
13	DF	CRO	Tomislav Puljić (to (Liechtenstein) Vaduz)
15	FW	SUI	Marco Schneuwly (to Sion)
16	DF	SUI	François Affolter (to (United States) San Jose Earthquakes)
20	DF	POR	Ricardo Costa (to (Portugal) Tondela)
23	DF	FRA	Sally Sarr (to Servette)
32	MF	SUI	Nicolas Haas (to (Italy) Atalanta)
38	DF	SUI	Olivier Kleiner (to Wohlen, previously on loan)
77	MF	GER	Markus Neumayr (to (Turkey) Kasımpaşa)

=== Sion ===
In:

No.	Pos.	Nation	Player
5	DF	SUI	Jan Bamert (from Grasshopper)
6	DF	BRA	Paulo Ricardo (from (Brazil) Santos, previously on loan)
7	DF	ITA	Federico Dimarco (from (Italy) Internazionale)
9	FW	BEL	Ilombe Mboyo (loan return from (Belgium) Cercle Brugge)
15	FW	SUI	Marco Schneuwly (from Luzern)
22	FW	ITA	Robert Acquafresca (from (Italy) Ternana)
23	DF	SUI	Eray Cümart (on loan from Basel)
33	MF	ALB	Ermir Lenjani (from (France) Rennes)
45	FW	SUI	Aimery Pinga (from Sion U21)
70	FW	BRA	Matheus Cunha (from (Brazil) Coritiba U20)
94	MF	BRA	Adryan (from (Brazil) Flamengo)
98	GK	SUI	Joao Castanheira (loan return from FC Sierre)

Out:

No.	Pos.	Nation	Player
3	DF	SUI	Reto Ziegler (released)
5	MF	SUI	Vero Salatić (released)
13	MF	COD	Chadrac Akolo (to (Germany) VfB Stuttgart)
17	DF	GAM	Pa Modou Jagne (to Zürich)
21	FW	POR	Ambrosio Da Costa (on loan to Neuchâtel Xamax)
22	MF	SUI	Daniel Follonier (from Luzern)
63	MF	BEL	Geoffrey Mujangi Bia (to (Turkey) Kayserispor)
87	DF	FRA	Jérémy Taravel (to (Belgium) Gent)
89	FW	BRA	Léo Itaperuna (to Aarau)
98	GK	SUI	Joao Castanheira (to Servette)

=== St. Gallen ===
In:

No.	Pos.	Nation	Player
2	DF	SUI	Philippe Koch (from (Italy) Novara)
7	MF	CRO	Stjepan Kukuruzović (from (Liechtenstein) Vaduz)
8	MF	ALB	Gjelbrim Taipi (from Schaffhausen)
20	MF	SUI	Noah Blasucci (from St. Gallen U21)
24	DF	SUI	Adonis Ajeti (from Wil)
25	FW	SUI	Nassim Ben Khalifa (from Lausanne)
26	MF	AUT	Peter Tschernegg (from (Austria) Wolfsberger AC)
27	FW	SUI	Albian Ajeti (from (Germany) FC Augsburg, previously on loan)
29	MF	SUI	Alessandro Kräuchi (from St. Gallen U21)
30	GK	SUI	Nico Krucker (from St. Gallen U18)
53	DF	SUI	Silvan Gönitzer (from St. Gallen U21)

Out:

No.	Pos.	Nation	Player
8	MF	SUI	Steven Lang (to Servette)
10	MF	BIH	Sejad Salihović (released)
13	MF	GER	Lucas Cueto (to (Germany) Preußen Münster)
14	DF	SUI	Roy Gelmi (to Thun)
15	MF	TUN	Mohamed Gouaida (loan return to (Germany) Hamburger SV)
19	MF	LUX	Mario Mutsch (to (Luxembourg) Progrès Niederkorn)
35	MF	SUI	Michael Scherrer (to Brühl, previously on loan)
41	GK	SUI	Pascal Albrecht (released)
80	MF	GER	Gianluca Gaudino (loan return to (Germany) Bayern Munich)

=== Thun ===
In:

No.	Pos.	Nation	Player
4	DF	SUI	Miguel Rodrigues (from Servette)
14	DF	SUI	Roy Gelmi (from St. Gallen)
20	DF	SUI	Chris Kablan (from Kriens)
24	MF	SUI	Nuno Da Silva (from Breitenrain)
32	DF	SUI	Elia Alessandrini (on loan from Young Boys U21)
35	FW	SUI	Nicolas Hunziker (from Basel)

Out:

No.	Pos.	Nation	Player
3	DF	SUI	Colin Trachsel (on loan to Rapperswil-Jona)
4	DF	SUI	Marco Bürki (loan return to Young Boys)
6	MF	SUI	Joël Geissmann (to Lausanne)
14	DF	SUI	Nicolas Schindelholz (to Luzern)
15	MF	ISR	Lotem Zino (to (Israel) Maccabi Petah Tikva)
16	MF	SUI	Christian Fassnacht (to Young Boys)
26	DF	SUI	Thomas Reinmann (retired)
27	MF	SUI	Enrico Schirinzi (to (Liechtenstein) Vaduz)

=== Young Boys ===
In:

No.	Pos.	Nation	Player
--	DF	SUI	Thomas Fekete (loan return from Chiasso)
--	FW	SUI	Marko Dangubic (loan return from Wohlen)
4	DF	SUI	Marco Bürki (loan return from Thun)
8	MF	SUI	Djibril Sow (from (Germany) Borussia Mönchengladbach)
16	FW	SUI	Christian Fassnacht (from Thun)
17	FW	CIV	Roger Assalé (from (Democratic Republic of the Congo) Mazembe, previously on loan)
18	FW	CMR	Jean-Pierre Nsamé (from Servette)
24	MF	GHA	Kasim Nuhu (from (Spain) Mallorca, previously on loan)
26	GK	SUI	David von Ballmoos (loan return from Winterthur)
27	MF	SUI	Miguel Castroman (loan return from Wohlen)
29	DF	SUI	Jordan Lotomba (from Lausanne)
34	MF	SUI	Kwadwo Duah (loan return from Neuchâtel Xamax)
43	DF	SUI	Kevin Mbabu (from (England) Newcastle United, previously on loan)

Out:

No.	Pos.	Nation	Player
--	FW	SUI	Marko Dangubic (on loan to Schaffhausen)
8	DF	CZE	Jan Lecjaks (to (Croatia) Dinamo Zagreb)
11	FW	SUI	Michael Frey (to Zürich)
14	MF	SRB	Milan Gajić (to (Liechtenstein) Vaduz)
18	GK	SUI	Yvon Mvogo (to (Germany) RB Leipzig)
21	DF	SUI	Alain Rochat (to Lausanne)
27	MF	SUI	Miguel Castroman (on loan to Schaffhausen)
28	MF	SUI	Denis Zakaria (to (Germany) Borussia Mönchengladbach)
32	DF	SUI	Linus Obexer (on loan to Neuchâtel Xamax)
34	MF	SUI	Kwadwo Duah (on loan to Winterthur)

=== Zürich ===
In:

No.	Pos.	Nation	Player
--	MF	ARM	Artem Simonyan (loan return from Le Mont)
--	FW	ALB	Armando Sadiku (loan return from Lugano)
4	DF	SUI	Albin Sadrijaj (from Zürich U21)
6	MF	ISL	Victor Pálsson (from (Denmark) Esbjerg)
9	FW	SUI	Michael Frey (from Young Boys)
18	DF	GAM	Pa Modou Jagne (from Sion)
19	MF	FRA	Yassin Maouche (from Servette)
22	MF	SUI	Kevin Rüegg (from Zürich U21])

Out:

No.	Pos.	Nation	Player
--	MF	ARM	Artem Simonyan (on loan to (Belarus) Krumkachy Minsk)
--	GK	SUI	Novem Baumann (on loan to Rapperswil-Jona)
--	DF	SUI	Nicolas Stettler (on loan to Winterthur)
--	FW	ALB	Armando Sadiku (to (Poland) Legia Warsaw)
10	MF	SUI	Davide Chiumiento (released)
15	MF	SUI	Oliver Buff (to (Spain) Real Zaragoza)
17	MF	SUI	Mike Kleiber (to Rapperswil-Jona)
25	DF	MNE	Ivan Kecojević (released)
