= 2020–21 FC Vaduz season =

FC Vaduz
2020–21 season
- Stadium: Rheinpark Stadion
- Swiss Super League: 10th (relegated)
- UEFA Europa League: First qualifying round

The 2020–21 FC Vaduz season was the club's 89th season in their existence and the first season since their return to the top flight of Swiss football after their promotion from the 2019–20 Swiss Challenge League. In addition to the 2020–21 Swiss Super League, Vaduz will participate in the 2020–21 Liechtenstein Cup. Teams from Liechtenstein are not allowed to enter the Swiss Cup, they play in the Liechtenstein Football Cup. The season covered the period from 19 September 2020 to 30 June 2021.

== Players ==
=== First-team squad ===
As of 1 August 2020.

Note: Flags indicate national team as defined under FIFA eligibility rules; some limited exceptions apply. Players may hold more than one non-FIFA nationality.

No.	Pos.	Nation	Player
1	GK	LIE	Benjamin Büchel (Captain)
4	DF	KOS	Denis Simani
6	DF	KOS	Fuad Rahimi
8	FW	MDA	Nicolae Milinceanu
9	FW	AUT	Manuel Sutter
10	FW	SEN	Mohamed Coulibaly
11	FW	SUI	Tunahan Cicek
12	DF	SUI	Gianni Antoniazzi
14	MF	SRB	Milan Gajić
15	DF	SUI	Yannick Schmid
17	MF	SUI	Dominik Schwizer (on loan from FC Thun)
18	GK	LIE	Justin Ospelt
19	FW	SUI	Dejan Đokić

No.	Pos.	Nation	Player
20	MF	SRB	Besart Bajrami
21	DF	GER	Pius Dorn
23	MF	LIE	Sandro Wieser
24	DF	SUI	Cédric Gasser
26	FW	LIE	Ferhat Saglam
28	MF	AUT	Boris Prokopič
30	MF	SUI	Gabriel Lüchinger
33	DF	LIE	Maximilian Göppel
35	MF	SUI	Yago Gomes do Nascimento
42	GK	SUI	Gion Chande
—	DF	GER	Nico Hug
—	FW	SUI	Matteo Di Giusto

== Transfers ==
=== In ===
No.	Pos	Player	Transferred from	Fee	Date	Source
15			TBD		1 July 2020	

=== Out ===
No.	Pos	Player	Transferred to	Fee	Date	Source
15			TBD		1 July 2020	

== Pre-season and friendlies ==
Win Draw Loss Fixtures

== Competitions ==
=== Overview ===
Competition	First match	Last match	Starting round	Final position	Record							
Competition	First match	Last match	Starting round	Final position	Pld	W	D	L	GF	GA	GD	Win %
Swiss Super League	August 2020	21 May 2021	Matchday 1	10th	36	9	9	18	36	58	−22	25.00
Total					36	9	9	18	36	58	−22	25.00

Source: Competitions

=== Swiss Super League ===
On Monday 31 August 2020 the Swiss Football League (SFL) published the schedule for the Raiffeisen Super League 2020–21. FCV start the new season on Sunday 20 September with an away game against Basel in St. Jakob-Park. In a first step, the SFL published the schedule for the first 18 rounds, but only fixed the times for the first nine rounds. The final schedule with all games will follow by the end of the year.

==== League table ====
Pos	Team	Pld	W	D	L	GF	GA	GD	Pts	Qualification or relegation
6	Lausanne-Sport	36	12	10	14	52	55	−3	46	
7	St. Gallen	36	11	11	14	45	48	−3	44	
8	Zürich	36	11	10	15	53	57	−4	43	
9	Sion (O)	36	8	14	14	48	58	−10	38	Qualification for the relegation play-offs
10	Vaduz (R)	36	9	9	18	36	58	−22	36	Qualification for the Europa Conference League second qualifying round and relegation to Challenge League (Note: Vaduz qualified for the Europa Conference League second qualifying round by being declared winners of the 2020–21 Liechtenstein Cup.)

Source: Swiss Super League
Rules for classification: 1) Points; 2) Goal difference; 3) Goals scored; 4) Head-to-head goal difference; 5) Away goals scored; 6) Draw.
(O) Play-off winners; (R) Relegated

==== Results summary ====
Overall								Home						Away					
Pld	W	D	L	GF	GA	GD	Pts	W	D	L	GF	GA	GD	W	D	L	GF	GA	GD
3	0	1	2	2	4	−2	1	0	0	1	0	1	−1	0	1	1	2	3	−1

Last updated: August 2020.

==== Results by round ====
Round	1	2	3	4	5	6	7	8
Ground	A	H	A	H	H			
Result	D	L	L	D	L		D	W
Position			9		10			

Updated to match(es) played on August 2020. Source:
A = Away; H = Home; W = Win; D = Draw; L = Loss

==== Matches ====
On Monday 31 August 2020 the Swiss Football League (SFL) published the schedule for the Raiffeisen Super League 2020–21. In a first step, the SFL published the schedule for the first 18 rounds, but only fixed times for the first nine rounds. The final schedule with all games for all 36 rounds followed at the end of the year.

20 September 2020 1	Basel	2–2	Vaduz	St. Jakob-Park, Basel
16:00	Cabral 5'; Stocker 38'	SFL report	29' Sutter; 78' Milinceanu	Attendance: 1,000; Referee: (Switzerland) Fedayi San (Gebenstorf)

27 September 2020 2	Vaduz	0–1	St. Gallen	Rheinpark Stadion, Vaduz
16:00	Simani (yellow card) 26'; Prokopič (yellow card) 34'; Schmid (yellow card) 90+3'	SFL summary	(yellow card) 71' Vincent Rüfli; 83' Ribeiro	Attendance: 1,000; Referee: (Switzerland) Lukas Fähndrich

4 October 2020 3	Young Boys	1–0	Vaduz	Stadion Wankdorf, Bern
16:00 CEST (UTC+2)	Nsame 62'	SFL summary		Attendance: 11,660; Referee: (Switzerland) Lionel Tschudi

17 October 2020 4	Vaduz	1–1	Lugano	Rheinpark Stadion, Vaduz
19:00	Tunahan Cicek 45'; Lüchinger (yellow card) 49'; Schmid (yellow card) 56'; Gasser (yellow card) 81'	SFL summary	(yellow card) 7' Custodio; (yellow card) 44' Lavanchy; 90+2' Ošs	Attendance: 1,360; Referee: (Switzerland) Adrien Jaccottet

24 October 2020 5	Vaduz	1–4	Zürich	Rheinpark Stadion, Vaduz
19:00	Lüchinger (yellow card) 39'; Schmied 74'	SFL summary	Sobiech 6'; Marchesano (yellow card) 23'; Aiyegun 41'; Ceesay 68'; Gnonto (yellow card) 74'; Schönbächler (yellow card) 76'Gnonto 78'; Doumbia (yellow card) 82'	Attendance: 1396; Referee: (Switzerland) Luca Piccolo

31 October 2020 6	Lausanne-Sport	3–0	Vaduz	Olympique de la Pontaise, Lausanne
19:00	Zekhnini (yellow card) 40'; Nanizayamo (yellow card) 42'; Turkeš 59'; Puertas (yellow card) 63'; Turkeš 68'; Geissmann 80'	SFL summary	(yellow card) 34' (yellow-red card) 58' Wieser; (yellow card) 90+1' Dorn	Attendance: 5 Referee: (Switzerland) Luca Cibelli

7 November 2020 7	Vaduz	P – P	Servette	Rheinpark Stadion, Vaduz
19:00

21 November 2020 8	Luzern	1–1	Vaduz	Swissporarena, Luzern
19:00	Sorgić 31'; Müller (yellow card) 39'; Carbonell (yellow card) 49' (yellow-red card) 50'; Emini (yellow card) 90+1'	SFL summary	(yellow card) 20' Sutter; (yellow card) 22' Simani; 87' (pen.) Gajić; (yellow card) 90+1' Gabriel Lüchinger	Attendance: 50; Referee: (Switzerland) Adrien Jaccottet, (Basel)

28 November 2020 9	Vaduz	4–1	Sion	Rheinpark Stadion, Vaduz
18:15	Cicek 23'; Dorn 46'; Cicek 54'; Coulibaly 59'; Simani (yellow card) 66'; Gasser (yellow card) 84'	SFL summary	(yellow card) 16' Hoarau; 41' Uldriķis; (yellow card) 47' Uldriķis; (yellow card) 66' Serey Dié; (yellow card) 90' Baltazar	Attendance: 50; Referee: (Switzerland) Alessandro Dudic

5 December 2020 10	St. Gallen	P – P	Vaduz	Kybunpark, St. Gallen

9 December 2020 7	Vaduz	0–2	Servette	Rheinpark Stadion, Vaduz
19:00	Schmid (yellow card) 27'; Simani (yellow card) 31'; Gajić (yellow card) 61'	SFL summary	(yellow card) 16' Sauthier; 27' Stevanović (49) Kyei	Attendance: 50; Referee: (Switzerland) Luca Piccolo

12 December 2020 11	Vaduz	0–2	Basel	Rheinpark Stadion, Vaduz
20:30	Coulibaly (yellow card) 21'; Cicek (yellow card) 32'; Prokopič (yellow card) 60' (yellow-red card) 68'	SFL summary	(yellow card) 45+1' Zhegrova; 62' (yellow card) 48' Marchand; 55' Afimico Pululu; (yellow card) 61' Petretta; (yellow card) 79' Lindner	Attendance: 5 Referee: (Switzerland) Adrien Jaccottet, (Basel)

17 December 2020 12	Vaduz	0–2	Lausanne-Sport	Rheinpark Stadion, Vaduz
18:15	Wieser (yellow card) 25'	SFL summary	(yellow card) 36' Jenz; 49' Puertas; 64' (pen.) Turkeš; (yellow card) 67' Puertas	Attendance: 5 Referee: (Switzerland) Stefan Horisberger

20 December 2020 13	Sion	2–1	Vaduz	Stade Tourbillon, Sion
16:00	Ruiz (yellow card) 17'; Grgić (yellow card) 58'; Zock 72'; Zock (yellow card) 83'; Abdellaoui 90'	SFL summary	(yellow card) 5' Prokopič; (yellow card) 29' Wieser; (yellow card) 51' Lüchinger; 76' Lüchinger	Attendance: 5 Referee: (Switzerland) Alessandro Dudic

23 December 2020 14	Servette	v	Vaduz	Stade de Genève, Geneva
15:15

20 January 2021 10	St. Gallen	v	Vaduz	Kybunpark, St. Gallen

24 January 2021 15	Vaduz	v	Young Boys	Rheinpark Stadion, Vaduz
16:00

27 January 2021 16	Zürich	0–1	Vaduz	Letzigrund, Zürich
18:15	Kramer (yellow card) 44' (yellow-red card) 89'; Ceesay (yellow card) 70'	Summary	(yellow card) 31' Gajić; (yellow card) 47' Obexer; 61' Schmid; (yellow card) 65' Wieser	Attendance: 5 Referee: (Switzerland) Adrien Jaccottet, Basel

Week 5 2021 17	Vaduz	v	Luzern	Rheinpark Stadion, Vaduz

Week 6 2021 18	Lugano	v	Vaduz	Cornaredo, Lugano

===== Second half of season =====
6 February 2021 19	Vaduz	3–2	Zürich	Rheinpark Stadion, Vaduz
20:30	Cicek (yellow card) 31'; Gajić (yellow card) 42' (goal) 54'; Schmied 64'; Di Giusto 78'; Rahimi (yellow card) 90+1'	Summary	43' (yellow card) 46' Marchesano; (yellow card) 58' Winter; (yellow card) 65' Džemaili; 83' Aliti; (yellow card) 90+4' Kramer	Attendance: 5 Referee: (Switzerland) Lukas Fähndrich

14 February 2021 20	Luzern	v	Vaduz	Swissporarena, Luzern
16:00

20 February 2021 21	Vaduz	v	St. Gallen	Rheinpark Stadion, Vaduz
18:15

28 February 2021 22	Sion	v	Vaduz	Stade Tourbillon, Sion
16:00

3 March 2021 23	Vaduz	v	Lausanne-Sport	Rheinpark Stadion, Vaduz
20:30

6 March 2021 24	Young Boys	v	Vaduz	Stadion Wankdorf, Bern
18:15

14 March 2021 25	Vaduz	0–3	Lugano	Rheinpark Stadion, Vaduz
16:00	Cicek (yellow card) 67'; Ibrisimovic (yellow card) 77'	SFV report	3', 24' Ardaiz; (yellow card) 26' Kecskés; 69' Marić	Attendance: 5 Referee: (Switzerland) Alain Bieri

21 March 2021 26	Servette	1–2	Vaduz	Stade de Genève, Geneva
16:00	Ondoua (yellow card) 63'; Sauthier (yellow card) 75'; Kyei 76'; Sasso (yellow card) 90'	SFV report	(yellow card) 25' Gasser; 28' Dorn; 50' Di Giusto; (yellow card) 63' Simani; (yellow card) 64' Lüchinger; (yellow card) 89' Sutter	Attendance: 0 Referee: (Switzerland) Stefan Horisberger

5 April 2021 27	Basel	1–2	Vaduz	St. Jakob-Park, Basel
16:00	Frei (yellow card) 23'; Simani 56' (o.g.); Sene (yellow card) 83'; Widmer (yellow card) 90+2'	SFV report	(yellow card) 23' Simani; 37' Schmied; 90+3' Schmid	Attendance: 0 Referee: (Switzerland) Nikolaj Hänni

10/11 April 2021 28	Vaduz	v	Sion	Rheinpark Stadion, Vaduz

17/18 April 2021 29	Lausanne-Sport	v	Vaduz	Stade de la Tuilière, Lausanne

21 April 2021 30	Vaduz	1–1	Basel	Rheinpark Stadion, Vaduz
20:30	Gajić 83' (pen.)	FCB report	(yellow card) 7' Zuffi; (yellow card) 19' Zhegrova; (yellow card) 44' Petretta; 79' Kasami; (yellow card) 86' Frei	Attendance: 25; Referee: (Switzerland) Lukas Fähndrich

24 April 2021 31	St. Gallen	1–0	Vaduz	Kybunpark, St. Gallen
18:15	Adamu 26'; Duah (yellow card) 30'; Stillhart (yellow card) 39'	Summary SVF	(yellow card) 52' Schmied; (yellow card) 76' Simani	Attendance: 100; Referee: (Switzerland) Nikolaj Hänni

1/2 May 2021 32	Vaduz	v	Luzern	Rheinpark Stadion, Vaduz

8/9 May 2021 33	Lugano	v	Vaduz	Cornaredo, Lugano

12/13 May 2021 34	Vaduz	v	Young Boys	Rheinpark Stadion, Vaduz

16 May 2021 35	Vaduz	v	Servette	Rheinpark Stadion, Vaduz
16:00

21 May 2021 36	Zürich	v	Vaduz	Letzigrund, Zürich
20:00

=== UEFA Europa League ===
27 August 2020 First qualifying round	Vaduz (Liechtenstein)	0-2	(Malta) Hibernians	Vaduz, Liechtenstein
19:00 CEST (UTC+2)				Stadium: Rheinpark Stadion
