= 2017–18 FC Luzern season =

FC Luzern
2017–18 season
- Chairman: Philipp Studhalter
- Manager: Markus Babbel; Gerardo Seoane
- Stadium: swissporarena
- Swiss Super League: 3rd
- Swiss Cup: Semi-finals
- Top goalscorer: League: Pascal Schürpf (11); All: Pascal Schürpf (13)
- Average home league attendance: 10,051
Home colours	Away colours

The 2017–18 season was the 93rd season in the history of Fussball-Club Luzern and the club's 12th consecutive season in the top flight of Swiss football.

== Players ==
=== First-team squad ===
Note: Flags indicate national team as defined under FIFA eligibility rules; some limited exceptions apply. Players may hold more than one non-FIFA nationality.

No.	Pos.	Nation	Player
1	GK	SUI	David Zibung
3	DF	SRB	Lazar Ćirković
4	DF	SUI	Stefan Knezevic
5	DF	BRA	Lucas Alves
6	MF	SUI	Remo Arnold
7	DF	SUI	Claudio Lustenberger
8	MF	SUI	Olivier Custodio
9	FW	AUS	Tomi Juric
10	MF	SUI	Daniel Follonier
11	MF	SUI	Pascal Schürpf
14	DF	SUI	Nicolas Schindelholz
15	DF	GER	Marvin Schulz
17	DF	SUI	Simon Grether
19	MF	SUI	Christian Schneuwly

No.	Pos.	Nation	Player
20	FW	SUI	Shkelqim Demhasaj
21	GK	SUI	Jonas Omlin
22	GK	SUI	Simon Enzler
24	FW	SUI	Ruben Vargas
25	DF	SUI	Yannick Schmid
27	DF	SUI	Christian Schwegler
29	DF	SUI	Dereck Kutesa
31	MF	KOS	Hekuran Kryeziu
34	DF	SUI	Silvan Sidler
35	MF	SUI	Filip Ugrinic
36	MF	KOS	Dren Feka
42	MF	KOS	Idriz Voca
68	MF	SUI	Francisco Rodríguez
80	MF	GEO	Valerian Gvilia

== Pre-season and friendlies ==
Win Draw Loss

28 June 2017 Friendly	Luzern (Switzerland)	3–3	(Switzerland) Kriens	Switzerland
19:00 CEST (UTC+2)		Report

1 July 2017 Friendly	Luzern (Switzerland)	0–0	Austria Lustenau	Switzerland
16:00 CEST (UTC+2)		Report

5 July 2017 Friendly	SV Sandhausen (Germany)	2–1	(Switzerland) Luzern	Germany
16:00 CEST (UTC+2)		Report

8 July 2017 Friendly	Strasbourg (France)	4–4	(Switzerland) Luzern	France
16:30 CEST (UTC+2)		Report

5 October 2017 Friendly	Luzern (Switzerland)	5–0	(Switzerland) Aarau	Lucerne, Switzerland
14:30 CEST (UTC+2)		Report		Stadium: Sportanlagen Allmend

10 November 2017 Friendly	Luzern (Switzerland)	0–3	(Switzerland) Chiasso	Lucerne, Switzerland
15:00 CET (UTC+1)		Report	Soumah 61'; Belometti 67'; Said 71'	Stadium: Sportanlagen Allmend

13 January 2018 Friendly	Luzern (Switzerland)	1–2	(Netherlands) Feyenoord	Marbella, Spain
16:00 CET (UTC+1)		Report		Stadium: Marbella Football Center

16 January 2018 Friendly	Shanghai Shenhua (China)	1–1	(Switzerland) Luzern	Marbella, Spain
16:00 CET (UTC+1)		Report		Stadium: Marbella Football Center

18 January 2018 Friendly	Luzern (Switzerland)	3–0	(Russia) Lokomotiv Moscow	Marbella, Spain
16:00 CET (UTC+1)		Report		Stadium: Marbella Football Center

23 January 2018 Friendly	Luzern (Switzerland)	1–1	(Switzerland) Chiasso	Lucerne, Switzerland
15:00 CET (UTC+1)		Report		Stadium: Stadion Allmend

27 January 2018 Friendly	Basel (Switzerland)	1–0	(Switzerland) Luzern	Basel, Switzerland
13:30 CET (UTC+1)		Report		Stadium: St. Jakob-Park

30 January 2018 Friendly	Luzern (Switzerland)	3–0	(Switzerland) FC Rapperswil-Jona	Jona, Switzerland
16:00 CET (UTC+1)		Report		Stadium: Stadion Grünfeld

== Competitions ==
=== Overall record ===
Competition	First match	Last match	Starting round	Final position	Record							
Competition	First match	Last match	Starting round	Final position	Pld	W	D	L	GF	GA	GD	Win %
Swiss Super League	23 July 2017	19 May 2018	Matchday 1	3rd	36	15	9	12	51	51	+0	41.67
Swiss Cup	12 August 2017	29 November 2017	Round 1	Quarter-finals	4	3	0	1	6	4	+2	75.00
UEFA Europa League	13 July 2017	20 July 2017	Second qualifying round	Second qualifying round	2	1	0	1	2	3	−1	50.00
Total					42	19	9	14	59	58	+1	45.24

Source: Competitions

=== Swiss Super League ===
==== League table ====
Pos	Team	Pld	W	D	L	GF	GA	GD	Pts	Qualification or relegation
1	Young Boys (C)	36	26	6	4	84	41	+43	84	Qualification for the Champions League play-off round
2	Basel	36	20	9	7	72	36	+36	69	Qualification for the Champions League second qualifying round
3	Luzern	36	15	9	12	51	51	0	54	Qualification for the Europa League third qualifying round
4	Zürich	36	12	13	11	50	44	+6	49	Qualification for the Europa League group stage (Note: Zürich qualified for the Europa League group stage by winning the 2017–18 Swiss Cup.)
5	St. Gallen	36	14	3	19	52	72	−20	45	Qualification for the Europa League second qualifying round

Source: Swiss Super League
Rules for classification: 1) Points; 2) Goal difference; 3) Goals scored; 4) Head-to-head goal difference; 5) Away goals scored; 6) Draw.
(C) Champions

==== Results summary ====
Overall								Home						Away					
Pld	W	D	L	GF	GA	GD	Pts	W	D	L	GF	GA	GD	W	D	L	GF	GA	GD
36	15	9	12	51	51	0	54	9	4	5	29	24	+5	6	5	7	22	27	−5

Source: Swiss Super League

==== Results by round ====
Round	1	2	3	4	5	6	7	8	9	10	11	12	13	14	15	16	17	18	19	20	21	22	23	24	25	26	27	28	29	30	31	32	33	34	35	36
Ground	H	A	H	A	A	H	H	A	H	A	A	H	A	H	A	H	H	A	H	H	A	A	H	A	H	A	H	A	H	A	H	A	H	A	H	A
Result	W	L	D	W	D	D	D	L	L	L	D	L	L	W	L	L	W	W	L	W	W	D	W	D	W	W	W	L	L	W	W	L	W	W	D	D
Position																																				

Source: World Football
A = Away; H = Home; W = Win; D = Draw; L = Loss

==== Matches ====
23 July 2017 Round 1	Luzern	1–0	Lugano	Lucerne
16:00 CEST (UTC+2)				Stadium: swissporarena

30 July 2017 Round 2	Basel	3–1	Luzern	St. Jakob-Park, Basel
16:00	Elyounoussi 14' (1:0); Bua 22' (2:0); (yellow card) 33' Akanji van Wolfswinkel 79' (3:1)	FCB summary	(yellow card) 33' Kryeziu; (yellow card) 50' Custodio; 54' (o.g. 2:1) Elyounoussi; (yellow card) 68' Juric	Attendance: 27,416; Referee: (Switzerland) Fedayi San

6 August 2017 Round 3	Luzern	2–2	Grasshopper	Lucerne
16:00 CEST (UTC+2)				Stadium: swissporarena

9 August 2017 Round 4	St. Gallen	0–2	Luzern	St. Gallen
20:00 CEST (UTC+2)				Stadium: AFG Arena

20 August 2017 Round 5	Sion	1–1	Luzern	Sion
16:00 CEST (UTC+2)				Stadium: Stade Tourbillon

27 August 2017 Round 6	Luzern	1–1	Zürich	Lucerne
16:00 CEST (UTC+2)				Stadium: swissporarena

10 September 2017 Round 7	Luzern	2–2	Thun	Lucerne
16:00 CEST (UTC+2)				Stadium: swissporarena

20 September 2017 Round 8	Young Boys	4–1	Luzern	Bern
20:00 CEST (UTC+2)				Stadium: Stadion Wankdorf

23 September 2017 Round 9	Luzern	2–3	Lausanne-Sport	Lucerne
19:00 CEST (UTC+2)				Stadium: swissporarena

1 October 2017 Round 10	Thun	2–0	Luzern	Thun
16:00 CEST (UTC+2)				Stadium: Stockhorn Arena

15 October 2017 Round 11	Grasshopper	1–1	Luzern	Zürich
16:00 CEST (UTC+2)				Stadium: Letzigrund

22 October 2017 Round 12	Luzern	0–1	Young Boys	Lucerne
16:00 CEST (UTC+2)				Stadium: swissporarena

29 October 2017 Round 13	Lugano	1–0	Luzern	Lugano
16:00 CEST (UTC+2)				Stadium: Stadio Cornaredo

5 November 2017 Round 14	Luzern	3–0	St. Gallen	Lucerne
16:00 CEST (UTC+2)				Stadium: swissporarena

19 November 2017 Round 15	Lausanne-Sport	3–1	Luzern	Lugano
16:00 CEST (UTC+2)				Stadium: Stade olympique de la Pontaise

25 November 2017 Round 16	Luzern	1–4	Basel	Swissporarena, Luzern
19:00	Shkelqim Demhasaj 19' (1:0); Grether (yellow card) 52'; Ziegler (yellow card) 56'; Kryeziu (red card) 86'	FCB summary	30' (1:1) Lang; (yellow card) 50' Xhaka; 69' (1:2) Oberlin; 81' (1:3) Itten; 90+2' (1:4) Lang	Attendance: 10,109; Referee: (Switzerland) Adrien Jaccottet (Basel)

2 December 2017 Round 17	Luzern	2–1	Sion	Lucerne
19:00 CEST (UTC+2)				Stadium: swissporarena

10 December 2017 Round 18	Zürich	1–2	Luzern	Zürich
16:00 CEST (UTC+2)				Stadium: Letzigrund

17 December 2017 Round 19	Luzern	2–4	Young Boys	Lucerne
16:00 CEST (UTC+2)				Stadium: swissporarena

3 February 2018 Round 20	Luzern	2–1	Lausanne-Sport	Lucerne
19:00 CEST (UTC+2)				Stadium: swissporarena

11 February 2018 Round 21	Grasshopper	1–2	Luzern	Zürich
16:00 CEST (UTC+2)				Stadium: Letzigrund

18 February 2018 Round 22	Zürich	1–1	Luzern	Zürich
16:00 CEST (UTC+2)				Stadium: Letzigrund

25 February 2018 Round 23	Luzern	2–1	Thun	Lucerne
16:00 CEST (UTC+2)				Stadium: swissporarena

4 March 2018 Round 24	Sion	1–1	Luzern	Sion
16:00 CEST (UTC+2)				Stadium: Stade Tourbillon

11 March 2018 Round 25	Luzern	1–0	Basel	Swissporarena, Luzern
16:00	Knezevic (yellow card) 36'; Gvilia 46'; Kryeziu (yellow card) 74'	FCB summary	(yellow card) 21' Bua; (yellow card) 32' Riveros; (yellow card) 57' Suchý; (yellow card) 92' Al. Ajeti; (yellow card) 93' Oberlin	Attendance: 11,749; Referee: (Switzerland) Fedayi San (Gebenstorf)

19 May 2018 Round 36	Basel	2–2	Luzern	St. Jakob-Park, Basel
19:00	Elyounoussi 17'; Frei (yellow card) 27'; Al. Ajeti 82'	FCB summary	9' Schulz; 85' Schürpf	Attendance: 25,161; Referee: (Switzerland) Fedayi San (Gebenstorf)

=== Swiss Cup ===
12 August 2017 Round 1	SC Kriens	0–1	Luzern	Stadion Kleinfeld, Kriens
		SFL summary

16 September 2017 Round 2	Servette	2–3	Luzern	Stade de Genève, Geneva
		SFL summary

26 October 2017 Round 3	FC Échallens Région	2–3	Luzern	Sportplatz 3 Sapins, Echallens
		SFL summary

29 November 2017 Quarter-final	Basel	2–1	FC Luzern	St. Jakob-Park, Basel
19:30	Lang 13' (1:0); Elyounoussi (yellow card) 41'; Lang 52' (2:1)	FCB summary ASF/SFV summary	22' (1:1) Schürpf; (yellow card) 41' Sidler; (yellow card) 60' Voca; (yellow card) 77' Schulz	Attendance: 7,715; Referee: (Switzerland) Sandro Schärer Buttikon

=== UEFA Europa League ===
==== Second qualifying round ====
13 July 2017 First leg	Osijek (Croatia)	2–0	(Switzerland) Luzern	Osijek, Croatia
20:45 CEST (UTC+2)	Ejupi 66'; Grezda 79'	Report		Stadium: Stadion Gradski vrt Attendance: 7,542; Referee: Marco Guida (Italy)

20 July 2017 Second leg	Luzern (Switzerland)	2–1 (2–3 agg.)	(Croatia) NK Osijek	Lucerne, Switzerland
19:45 CEST (UTC+2)	Juric 19', 62'	Report	Ejupi 72'	Stadium: swissporarena Attendance: 8,483; Referee: Martin Lundby (Norway)
