= Simon Grether =

Swiss footballer (born 1992)

Personal information
- Date of birth: 20 May 1992 (age 34)
- Place of birth: Fribourg, Switzerland
- Height: 1.78 m (5 ft 10 in)
- Positions: Defender; midfielder

Team information
- Current team: Dornach

Youth career
- 2000–2006: FC Reinach
- 2006–2012: Basel

Senior career*
Years	Team	Apps	(Gls)
2009–2012	Basel U21	64	(7)
2012–2014	Basel	2	(0)
2013	→ Bellinzona (loan)	9	(0)
2013–2014	→ Winterthur (loan)	21	(0)
2014	→ Winterthur II (loan)	4	(1)
2014–2016	Wohlen	47	(2)
2016–2022	Luzern	120	(2)
2017	Luzern II	2	(0)
2022	FC Rotkreuz	9	(0)
2023	Black Stars Basel		
2023–	Dornach		

International career^{‡}
2010	Switzerland U-18	1	(0)
2010–2011	Switzerland U-19	13	(0)
2011–2012	Switzerland U-20	10	(0)
2013	Switzerland U-21	1	(0)
- * Club domestic league appearances and goals ‡ National team caps and goals as of 31 December 2013

Simon Grether (born 20 May 1992) is a Swiss former professional footballer who played as defender or midfielder. He was also youth international footballer. He retired from professional football in 2022 after spending six seasons with Luzern.

== Club career ==
=== Youth football, Basel ===
Born in Fribourg, Grether grew up in Reinach, Basel-Landschaft. He started his youth football with local team FC Reinach. In 2006, he moved to the youth department of Basel and progressed through the ranks. He played in their U-16 and U-18 teams and with both he won the Swiss championship, in 2008 and 2010. His teammates in the U-18 squad included Arlind Ajeti, Kofi Nimeley, Sandro Wieser, Stjepan Vuleta and Roman Buess. Grether advanced to Basel's U-21 team who played in the 1. Liga at that time the third highest tier in the Swiss football league system, for the 2010–11 season, becoming regular starter. He signed his first professional contract on 24 May 2012 and He joined Basel's first team for their 2012–13 season under head coach Heiko Vogel.

After having played in eight test games, Grether played his domestic league debut for the team 13 July 2012, in the away game in the Stade de Genève, coming on as a substitute as Basel won 1–0 against Servette. He played his first European match in the 2012–13 UEFA Champions League second qualifying round in the home game in the St. Jakob-Park on 24 July as Basel won 3–0 against Flora Tallinn. Apart from these two games and one substitute appearance in the 2012–13 Swiss Cup, Grether gained playing practice in the U-21. One of his rare goals was scored in the away game as they won 5–2 against Yverdon-Sports on 22 October 2012. The FCB U-21 team were pushing to win the championship, but at the end of the season they missed, solely on goal difference.

=== Loan to Bellinzona and Winterthur ===
On 31 January 2013, FCB announced that Grether was loaned out to Bellinzona in the Swiss Challenge League to gain more playing experience. He settled in slowly but surely and at the end of the season had nine appearances for the team, eight of which over the full 90 minutes.

At the beginning of the next season Basel announced that Grether had prolonged his contract, but was loaned out to Winterthur. In that 2013–14 Challenge League season, Grether played in 21 league matches, he also had one appearance in the 2013–14 Swiss Cup and four for the reserve team.

=== Wohlen ===
Although Grether had a valid contract with Basel, the club released him so that he could continue his career with Wohlen, who also played in the Swiss Challenge League. He played his debut for his new club in the away game on 14 September as Wohlen won 1–0 against Lausanne-Sport. He scored his first goal for his team in the home game as they won 2–1 against Lugano. In his first season with the club, he played 24 league matches, scoring one goal. He also played two games in the Swiss Cup. Then in his second he played 23 league matches, also scoring one goal, the team ended the season in eighth position. He had two appearances in the Swiss Cup this season as well, the team being knocked out of the competition by Zürich in the second round.

=== Luzern ===
In June 2016, Grether moved to FC Luzern, signing a two-year contract until the end of June 2018, but with an option for a further year. He joined Luzern's first team for their 2016–17 season under head coach Markus Babbel. He played his domestic league debut for his new club on the first matchday, an away game at the Cornaredo, on 23 July as Luzern won 2–1 against Lugano. He played in 21 of the team's league games that season, the team ending the season in fifth position. He had one appearance in the third qualifying round of the Europa League, coming on as substitute in the 1–1 draw against Sassuolo. He also had four appearances in the 2016–17 Swiss Cup, where the team advanced as far as the semi-finals, but here were beaten 6–5 on penalties by Sion.

In their 2017–18 season the team started well but inconsistent. However, this then took a dip to the worse, between September and November the team lost seven of nine games and slipped to last position in the table. At this point Grether rose to become a very important character in the team, although to the beginning of his time with the club he was thought to be back-up player. On 16 April 2018, the club announced that his contract would continue for another year. He thanked them by scoring his first goal for the team just a few days later, on 22 April. It was the winning goal of the game, in the third minute of added time, as Luzern won 2–1 against Zürich. The team rose up the table and at the end of the season they were in third position in the table. Grether had 26 league appearances. He had three appearances in the 2017–18 Swiss Cup, where the team had advanced to the quarter-final, but were eliminated by Basel.

The 2018–19 league season also contained a string of inconsistent results for Luzern. They lost five of their first seven home games, but won five of eight away games. This continued in the second half of the season. Luzern lost five of their nine home matches, but only won two of their away games. Grether was in the starting eleven during most of the games in the first half of the season, but spent most of the second half on the substitutes bench. He had 23 league appearances. He had two cup appearances, where the team advanced to the semi-finals, but were then knocked-out by Thun.

Grether spent a longer period at the beginning of the 2019–20 league season out with injuries. Just as he recovered the team dropped in form and lost six games in a row, slipping into the relegation zone. The second half of the season showed improvement, the team ended the season in sixth position and Grether had 23 appearances. He had three appearances in the cup, where Luzern were knocked out in the quarter-finals by Young Boys.

On 14 August 2020, before the beginning of the 2020–21 league season, Grether prolongend his contract with the club until the summer of 2022. But as the season began, on 19 September he was out again injured. This time it was adductor injury that kept him out for ten games at the start of the season, the injury reoccurred and he missed another five matches in February and March. The team started unstable into the season, slipping immediately into the relegation zone, spending most of the time in second last position. During the second half they found more stability and achieved a number of good results, rising to the fifth position at the end of the season. Grether started in just eight games and had five further appearances as substitute. In the 2020–21 Swiss Cup things ran better. Luzern advanced to the final, played on 24 May 2021 in the Stadion Wankdorf in Bern. Luzern beat St. Gallen 3–1, with Grether coming on as substitute, to win the trophy.

As cup winners in the previous season Luzern were qualified for third qualifying round of the 2021–22 Conference League. Grether played in the return leg on 12 August 2021 and led the team as captain, but they were defeated by Feyenoord. In the 2021–22 league things ran badly from the very beginning, the team remained permanently in the relegation zone throughout the season. They ended in second last position and had to play the relegation play-offs, the first leg ending with a 2–2 draw, Luzern winning the second leg 2–0 and avoiding relegation. Grether had just 14 league appearances this season. To contrary, in the 2021–22 Swiss Cup Luzern advanced to the semi-finals, where they played a 2–2 draw against Lugano, only to be defeated on the penalty shoot-out. Grether had two appearances in the cup. At the end of the season Luzern announced that they would be parting ways with four players, Marvin Schulz, Tsiy William Ndenge, Silvan Sidler and Simon Grether.

=== Rotkreuz ===
At this point Grether decided to retire from professional football and he started a job as Salesmanager. The newly promoted to the 1. Liga amateur club FC Rotkreuz, announced on 14 July 2022 that they had signed Grether for their new season.

=== Black Stars ===
Spontaneously the opportunity arose for Grether to move back to Basel, he was offered an apartment. In an interview he said that it was always clear to his family that he would go back home, because my family and many of our friends there. In January 2023 Grether joined amateur club Black Stars Basel, who at that time played in the 1. Liga, the fourth highest tier in the Swiss football league system. The club were in desperate need of strengthening because they suffered relegation during the previous season and were pressing for immediate promotion.

=== Dornach ===
On 1 July 2023 Grether joined Dornach, who at that time played in the 2. Liga Interregional, the fifth tier.

== International career ==
Grether played his first ever international game for the Switzerland U-18 team on the day before his 18th birthday. On 19 May 2010 the Swiss team beat Ukraine U-18 2–0. Grether made his debut for the Switzerland U-19 team in the 1–1 draw with Czech Republic U-19 on 4 September 2010. He played his debut for the Switzerland U-20 team in the 3–2 win against the Italian U-20 on 31 August 2011.

On 6 February 2013, Grether made his debut for the Swiss U-21 team in the El Madrigal stadium in Villarreal, Spain, being substituted in in the 79th minute. The game ended with a 0–1 defeat against the Slovak U-21 team.

== Private life ==
Before signing his first professional football contract, Grether completed business school in Basel. Grether is married. His first daughter was born in May 2017.

== Titles and honours ==
Basel

- Swiss champion at U-16 level: 2007–08
- Swiss Cup winner at U-16 level: 2007–08
- Swiss Champion at U-18 level: 2009–10
- Swiss Super League: 2012–13

Luzern

- Swiss Cup: 2020–21
