= Schwendibach =

- Former municipality
- Flag Coat of arms
- Location of Schwendibach
- Location within Switzerland Location within Canton of Bern
- Coordinates: 46°46′N 7°39′E
- Country: Switzerland
- Canton: Bern
- District: Thun

Government
  - Mayor: Roland Amstutz

Area
  - Total: 1.49 km^{2} (0.58 sq mi)
- Elevation: 880 m (2,890 ft)

Population (Dec 2012)
  - Total: 255
  - Density: 171/km^{2} (443/sq mi)
- Time zone: UTC+01:00 (CET)
  - Summer (DST): UTC+02:00 (CEST)
- Postal code: 3624
- SFOS number: 937
- ISO 3166 code: CH-BE
- Surrounded by: Homberg, Steffisburg, Thun
- Website: www.schwendibach.ch

Schwendibach is a former municipality in the administrative district of Thun in the canton of Bern in Switzerland. On 1 January 2020 the former municipality of Schwendibach merged into the municipality of Steffisburg.

== History ==
Schwendibach is first mentioned in 1388 as Swendibach.

The area was gradually settled as small farms cleared the land during the Late Middle Ages. The land was originally owned by the Count of Kyburg. After the defeat of the Austrian backed Kyburgs in the Burgdorferkrieg, in 1384 the Kyburg lands were acquired by the city of Bern. Throughout its history it formed a chapelry with Goldiwil (now a village in Thun) in the parish of Thun. Traditionally the residents farmed, raised dairy cattle, produced cheese or cut timber. Today about two-thirds of the residents commute to jobs in nearby cities, while the remainder generally work on small farms. By 2004 the community no longer had a school. The kindergarten moved to Buchen and the primary school went to Homberg. After 2004 the municipal administration moved into the empty school house.

== Geography ==
Schwendibach has an area of 1.49 km^{2} (0.58 sq mi). As of the 2004 survey, a total of 1.04 km^{2} (0.40 mi^{2}) or 69.3% is used for agricultural purposes, while 0.31 km^{2} (0.12 mi^{2}) or 20.7% is forested. Of rest of the municipality 0.16 km^{2} (0.062 mi^{2}) or 10.7% is settled (buildings or roads).

From the same survey, housing and buildings made up 6.7% and transportation infrastructure made up 4.0%. All of the forested land area is covered with heavy forests. Of the agricultural land, 10.0% is used for growing crops and 56.7% is pasturage, while 2.7% is used for orchards or vine crops.

The municipality is located on the northern slope of the Grüsisberg. It consists of the small village of Schwendibach and scattered hamlets and farm houses.

On 31 December 2009 Amtsbezirk Thun, the municipality's former district, was dissolved. On the following day, 1 January 2010, it joined the newly created Verwaltungskreis Thun.

== Coat of arms ==
The blazon of the municipal coat of arms is Argent a Bend sinister wavy Azure between a Mullet of seven Gules and a Stump eradicated Sable flambant of the third.

== Demographics ==
Schwendibach has a population (as of December 2020) of 237. As of 2012, 2.0% of the population are resident foreign nationals. Between the last 2 years (2010-2012) the population changed at a rate of -4.1%. Migration accounted for -0.4%, while births and deaths accounted for -1.5%.

Most of the population (as of 2000) speaks German (258 or 98.5%) as their first language, French is the second most common (2 or 0.8%) and Italian is the third (1 or 0.4%).

As of 2008, the population was 53.8% male and 46.2% female. The population was made up of 142 Swiss men (53.4% of the population) and 1 (0.4%) non-Swiss men. There were 120 Swiss women (45.1%) and 3 (1.1%) non-Swiss women. Of the population in the municipality, 89 or about 34.0% were born in Schwendibach and lived there in 2000. There were 134 or 51.1% who were born in the same canton, while 27 or 10.3% were born somewhere else in Switzerland, and 7 or 2.7% were born outside of Switzerland.

As of 2012, children and teenagers (0–19 years old) make up 20.4% of the population, while adults (20–64 years old) make up 63.5% and seniors (over 64 years old) make up 16.1%.

As of 2000, there were 116 people who were single and never married in the municipality. There were 124 married individuals, 13 widows or widowers and 9 individuals who are divorced.

As of 2010, there were 21 households that consist of only one person and 9 households with five or more people. In 2000, a total of 94 apartments (86.2% of the total) were permanently occupied, while 11 apartments (10.1%) were seasonally occupied and 4 apartments (3.7%) were empty. As of 2012, the construction rate of new housing units was 7.8 new units per 1000 residents. In 2012, single family homes made up 26.9% of the total housing in the municipality.

The historical population is given in the following chart:

== Economy ==
As of 2011, Schwendibach had an unemployment rate of 0.86%. As of 2011, there were a total of 57 people employed in the municipality. Of these, there were 21 people employed in the primary economic sector and about 9 businesses involved in this sector. The secondary sector employs 3 people and there were 2 businesses in this sector. The tertiary sector employs 33 people, with 9 businesses in this sector. There were 152 residents of the municipality who were employed in some capacity, of which females made up 40.8% of the workforce.

In 2008 there were a total of 29 full-time equivalent jobs. The number of jobs in the primary sector was 13, all of which were in agriculture. The number of jobs in the secondary sector was 5 of which 3 were in manufacturing and 2 were in construction. The number of jobs in the tertiary sector was 11. In the tertiary sector; 3 or 27.3% were in wholesale or retail sales or the repair of motor vehicles, 1 was in the movement and storage of goods, 3 or 27.3% were technical professionals or scientists, 1 was in education.

In 2000, there were 19 workers who commuted into the municipality and 114 workers who commuted away. The municipality is a net exporter of workers, with about 6.0 workers leaving the municipality for every one entering. A total of 38 workers (66.7% of the 57 total workers in the municipality) both lived and worked in Schwendibach. Of the working population, 7.9% used public transportation to get to work, and 60.5% used a private car.

The local and cantonal tax rate in Schwendibach is one of the lowest in the canton. In 2012 the average local and cantonal tax rate on a married resident, with two children, of Schwendibach making 150,000 CHF was 12.1%, while an unmarried resident's rate was 18%. For comparison, the average rate for the entire canton in 2011, was 14.2% and 22.0%, while the nationwide average was 12.3% and 21.1% respectively.

In 2010 there were a total of 111 tax payers in the municipality. Of that total, 28 made over 75,000 CHF per year. The greatest number of workers, 34, made between 50,000 and 75,000 CHF per year. The average income of the over 75,000 CHF group in Schwendibach was 101,254 CHF, while the average across all of Switzerland was 131,244 CHF.

In 2011 a total of 1.5% of the population received direct financial assistance from the government.

== Politics ==
In the 2011 federal election the most popular party was the Swiss People's Party (SVP) which received 53.7% of the vote. The next three most popular parties were the Conservative Democratic Party (BDP) (16.7%), the Federal Democratic Union of Switzerland (EDU) (10.4%) and the Green Party (4.2%). In the federal election, a total of 116 votes were cast, and the voter turnout was 57.1%.

== Religion ==
From the 2000 census, 190 or 72.5% belonged to the Swiss Reformed Church, while 9 or 3.4% were Roman Catholic. Of the rest of the population, there were 33 individuals (or about 12.60% of the population) who belonged to another Christian church. 16 (or about 6.11% of the population) belonged to no church, are agnostic or atheist, and 14 individuals (or about 5.34% of the population) did not answer the question.

== Education ==
In Schwendibach about 61.6% of the population have completed non-mandatory upper secondary education, and 14.4% have completed additional higher education (either university or a Fachhochschule). Of the 23 who had completed some form of tertiary schooling listed in the census, 65.2% were Swiss men, 34.8% were Swiss women.

As of 2000, there were a total of 23 students attending any school in the municipality. Of those, 23 both lived and attended school in the municipality, while 12 students from Schwendibach attended schools outside the municipality.
