= Steffisburg =

- Municipality
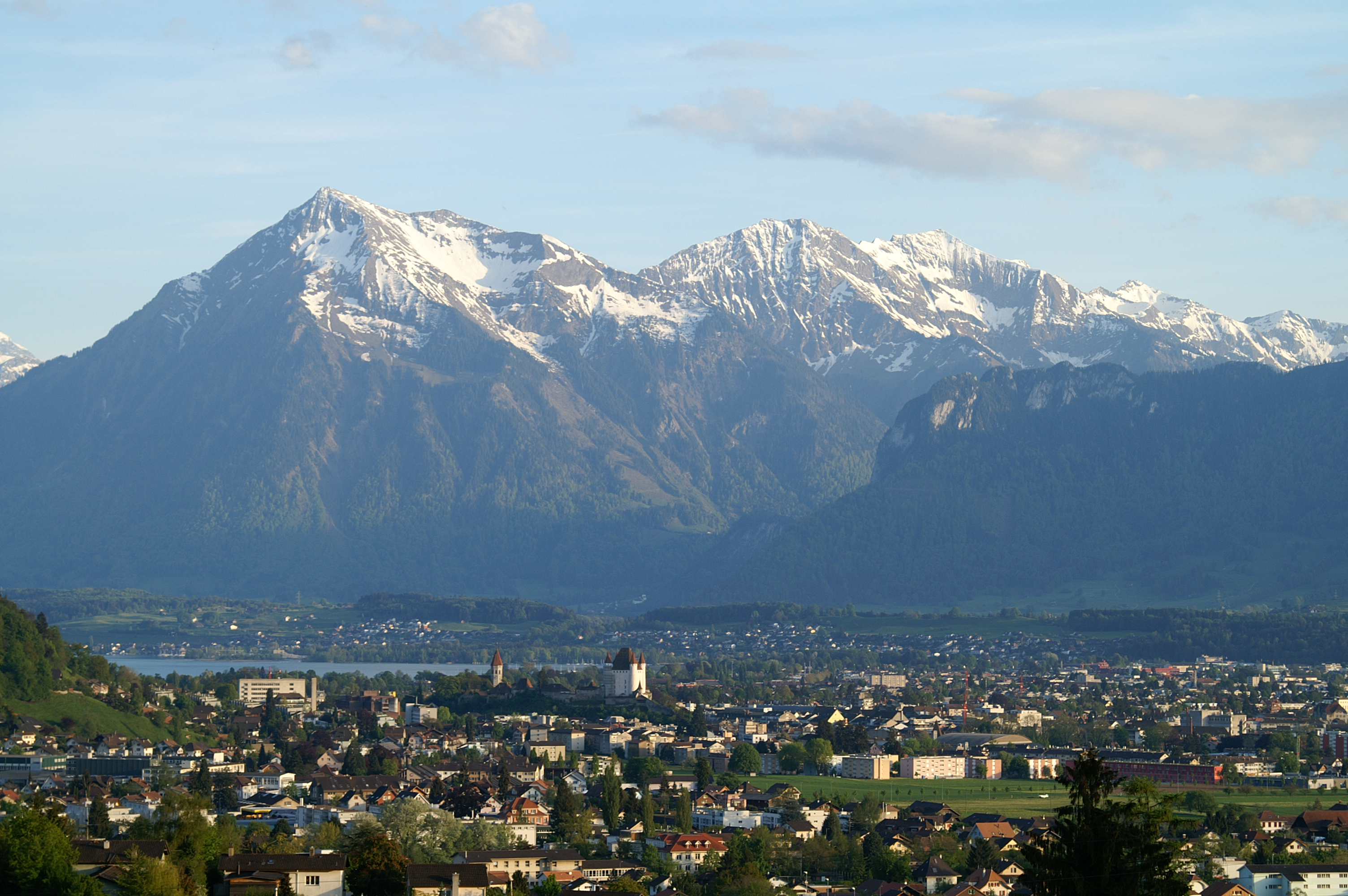

- Flag Coat of arms
- Location of Steffisburg
- Location within Switzerland Location within Canton of Bern
- Coordinates: 46°46′N 7°38′E
- Country: Switzerland
- Canton: Bern
- District: Thun

Government
  - Executive: Gemeinderat with 7 members
  - Mayor: Gemeindepräsident; Jürg Marti
  - Parliament: Grosser Gemeinderat with 34 members

Area
  - Total: 13.5 km^{2} (5.2 sq mi)
- Elevation: 585 m (1,919 ft)

Population (Dec 2012)
  - Total: 15,515
  - Density: 1,150/km^{2} (2,980/sq mi)
- Time zone: UTC+01:00 (CET)
  - Summer (DST): UTC+02:00 (CEST)
- Postal code: 3612,3613
- SFOS number: 939
- ISO 3166 code: CH-BE
- Surrounded by: Fahrni, Heimberg, Homberg, Schwendibach, Thun
- Twin towns: Jindrichuv Hradec (Czech Republic)
- Website: www.steffisburg.ch

Steffisburg is a municipality in the administrative district of Thun in the canton of Bern in Switzerland. On 1 January 2020 the former municipality of Schwendibach merged into the municipality of Steffisburg.

== History ==
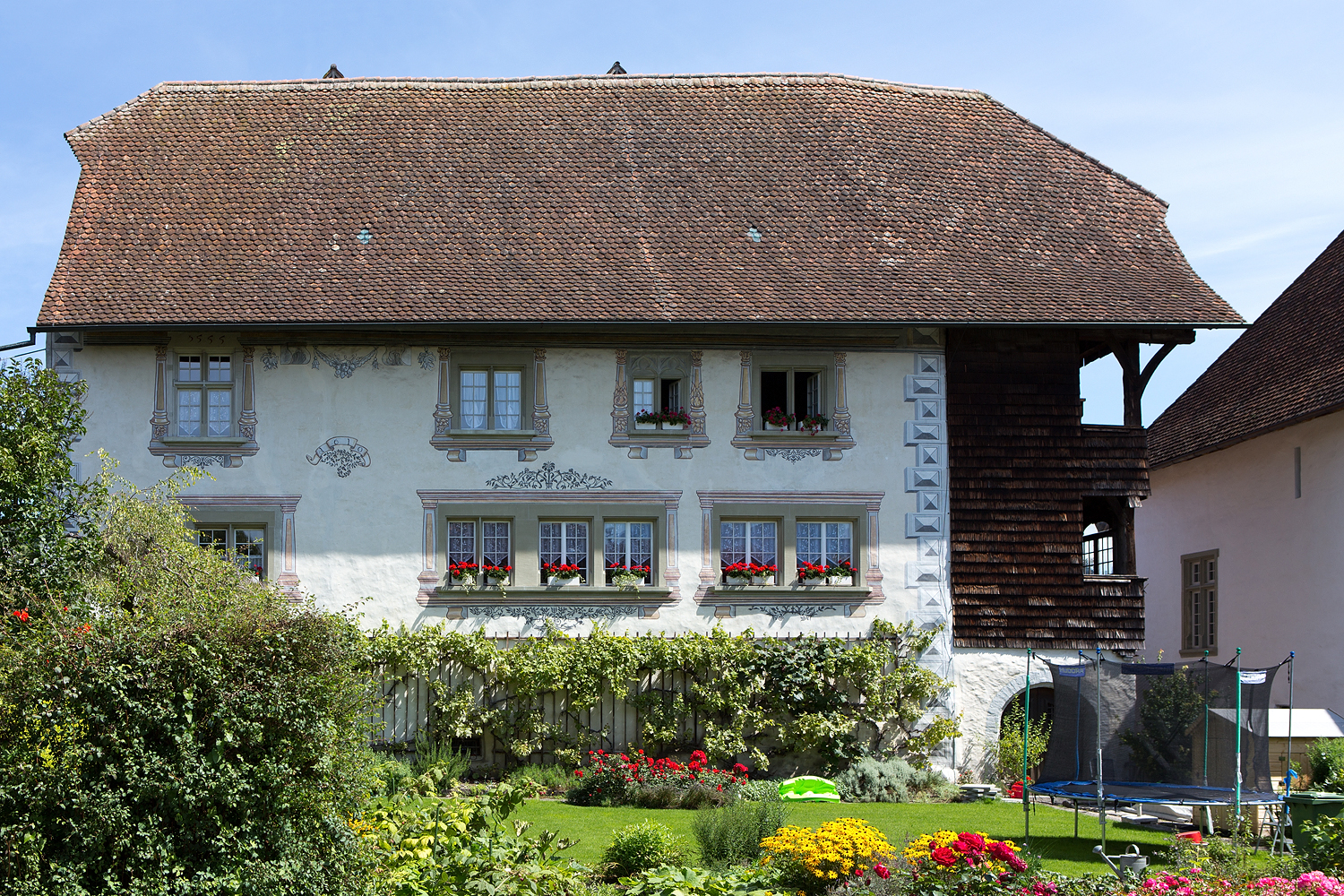
Kleine Höchhus in Steffisburg

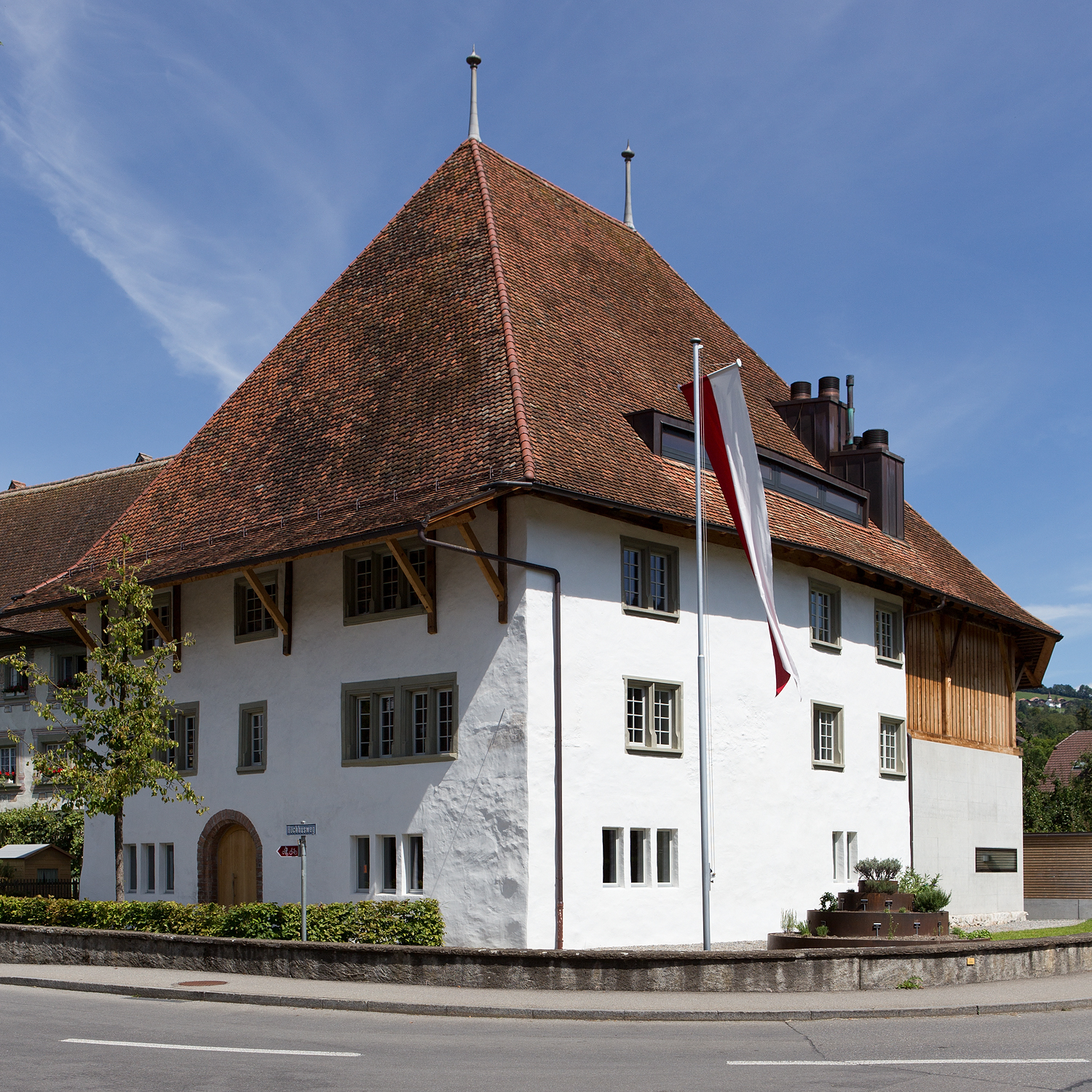
Grosse Höchhus

Aerial view of Steffisburg from an observation balloon between 1914-1918

Aerial view (1954)

Steffisburg is first mentioned in 1133 as Stevensburc. The municipality was formerly known by its French name Steffisbourg.

The area around Steffisburg has been inhabited since the Neolithic era and remained occupied during the Bronze Age. Traces of a Roman site were discovered in Schwäbis. Early medieval graves have been discovered at Zelgmatte and Klosterhubel. By the High Middle Ages the entire Zulgtal, including Steffisburg, was owned by the local Freiherr von Heimberg family. Under the Zähringer family, the Grafschaft of Thun expanded to include the village. When they died out in 1218 it passed to the Kyburgs, who made Steffisburg a fief for several different Ministerialis (unfree knights in the service of a feudal overlord) families. One of these families, the von Kien, built what became known as the Kleine Höchhus in the 14th century, when they administered the municipality. Today, the Kleine Höchhus is one of the oldest buildings in the municipality. Steffisburg became the center of a local court jurisdiction. Over the following years portions of the village and surrounding farms were donated to several local monasteries.

On 11 November 1382, Rudolf II von Kyburg, attempted unsuccessfully to attack Solothurn. His attack started the Burgdorferkrieg (also Kyburgerkrieg) with the Old Swiss Confederacy. Bern used the war to expand north into the Aargau and south into the Oberland. As part of the peace treaty, Bern bought the city of Thun and all its surrounding lands including Steffisburg. By the 15th century ownership of the town passed from former Kyburg nobles to Bernese patricians. In 1480 the Bernese Schultheiss Heinrich Matter built the Grosse Höchhus near the Kleine Höchhus and on the ruins of Stevensburc castle. While the Höchhus was rebuilt several times over the centuries it remained essentially unchanged.

Under Bernese rule, the town remained the center of a court. The court house was built in 1543 and in 1549 it became a tavern in addition to being the courthouse. While it was part of the District of Thun, Steffisburg retained a measure of independence. They had their own laws, which were first codified in 1405 and remained in effect until 1834. In 1476 they raised their own company of soldiers who marched under their own banner but were under Thun's overall command. In 1553 they raised a company of riflemen who drilled in Steffisburg, separate from Thun's military. During the 1641 and 1653 peasant revolts the soldiers from Steffisburg rose up against the cities of Thun and Bern. Though the revolt was unsuccessful, Steffisburg retained its position as a regional center and court. A leader of the revolt, Hans Berger from Steffisburg, fled the country to escape execution for his role in the uprising.

Following the 1798 French invasion, Steffisburg became the capital of the Helvetic Republic Steffisburg district. After the collapse of the Republic and 1803 Act of Mediation it joined the newly created Thun District.

The town's parish church was first built in the late 7th or early 8th century. It was replaced with a new building in the 9th or 10th century. It was first mentioned in 1224 as the Church of St. Stephan, which was the center of a large parish which covered the entire Zulg river valley (Zulgtal). The bell tower was added between 1320 and 1500. In 1528, Bern adopted the new faith of the Protestant Reformation and the church at Steffisburg converted. The attached ossuary chapel was demolished soon thereafter. In the following century the Anabaptist faith became popular in the upper Zulgtal. To help curb this faith's popularity, in 1693 a large parish church was built in Schwarzenegg (now part of Oberlangenegg) and the Steffisburg parish divided. In 1681 the current church building was built in Steffisburg, incorporating elements from the 9th- or 10th-century building.

Traditionally the local economy was fairly diverse. The farmers raised crops on the valley floor and raised livestock in alpine meadows during the summer before bringing them down for the winter. By the 14th century there were vineyards on the sunny south facing mountain slopes. The Zulg river provided power for a number of grain mills, saw mills, fulling mills and later gunpowder mills. In the 1700s pottery factories and several brick factories opened in the town. In 1809 a brewery opened, followed by a second in 1818. During the 19th century the Aare and Zulg river correction projects helped drain swampy land and protected the growing town from flooding. The town was located on the Bern-Thun road, which was expanded in the 19th century bringing additional business to the area. The completion of a road to the upper Emmental which passed through Steffisburg in 1895–1900 brought more traffic and money, as did the Burgdorf-Thun railroad on 1899 and the Steffisburg-Thun-Interlaken tram in 1913. Since 1900, the town has experienced several housing booms as commuters move to Steffisburg to be close to jobs in Thun.

In 1850 the Swiss Federal Government built the Regie in Schwäbis to house horses for cavalry for the Swiss Army. It was converted into a warehouse for military vehicles in 1982 and in 2008 became a museum that housed historic army equipment.

Steffisburg has ten kindergartens, eight primary schools and two secondary schools in a single school district.

== Geography ==
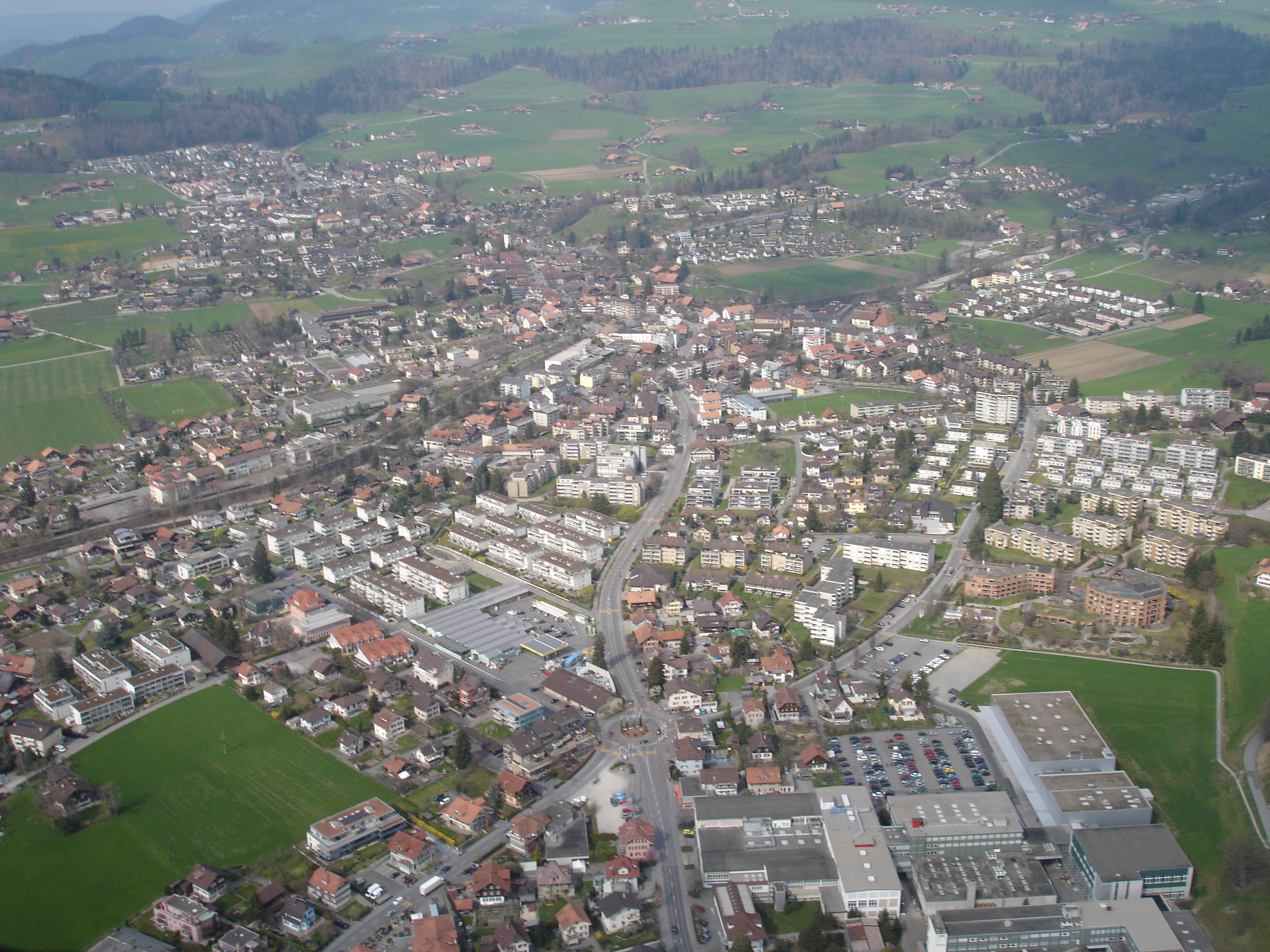
Aerial view of Steffisburg

Steffisburg has an area of 14.81 km^{2} (5.72 sq mi). As of the 2004 survey, a total of 5.69 km^{2} (2.20 mi^{2}) or 42.6% is used for agricultural purposes, while 3.92 km^{2} (1.51 mi^{2}) or 29.3% is forested. Of rest of the municipality 3.68 km^{2} (1.42 mi^{2}) or 27.5% is settled (buildings or roads), 0.16 km^{2} (0.062 mi^{2}) or 1.2% is either rivers or lakes.

From the same survey, industrial buildings made up 2.9% of the total area while housing and buildings made up 17.4% and transportation infrastructure made up 5.9%. while parks, green belts and sports fields made up 1.1%. All of the forested land area is covered with heavy forests. Of the agricultural land, 21.7% is used for growing crops and 17.7% is pasturage, while 3.1% is used for orchards or vine crops. All the water in the municipality is flowing water.

The municipality is located in the lower Zulg river valley (Zulgtal) and along the right bank of the Aare river. It consists of the town of Steffisburg which is divided into the medieval old village and the Au, Schwäbis, Bernstrasse, Glockenthal, Hübeli, Flühli and Hardegg neighborhoods.

On 31 December 2009 Amtsbezirk Thun, the municipality's former district, was dissolved. On the following day, 1 January 2010, it joined the newly created Verwaltungskreis Thun.

== Coat of arms ==
The blazon of the municipal coat of arms is Gules a Castle Argent on a Mount of 3 Coupeaux Vert.

== Demographics ==
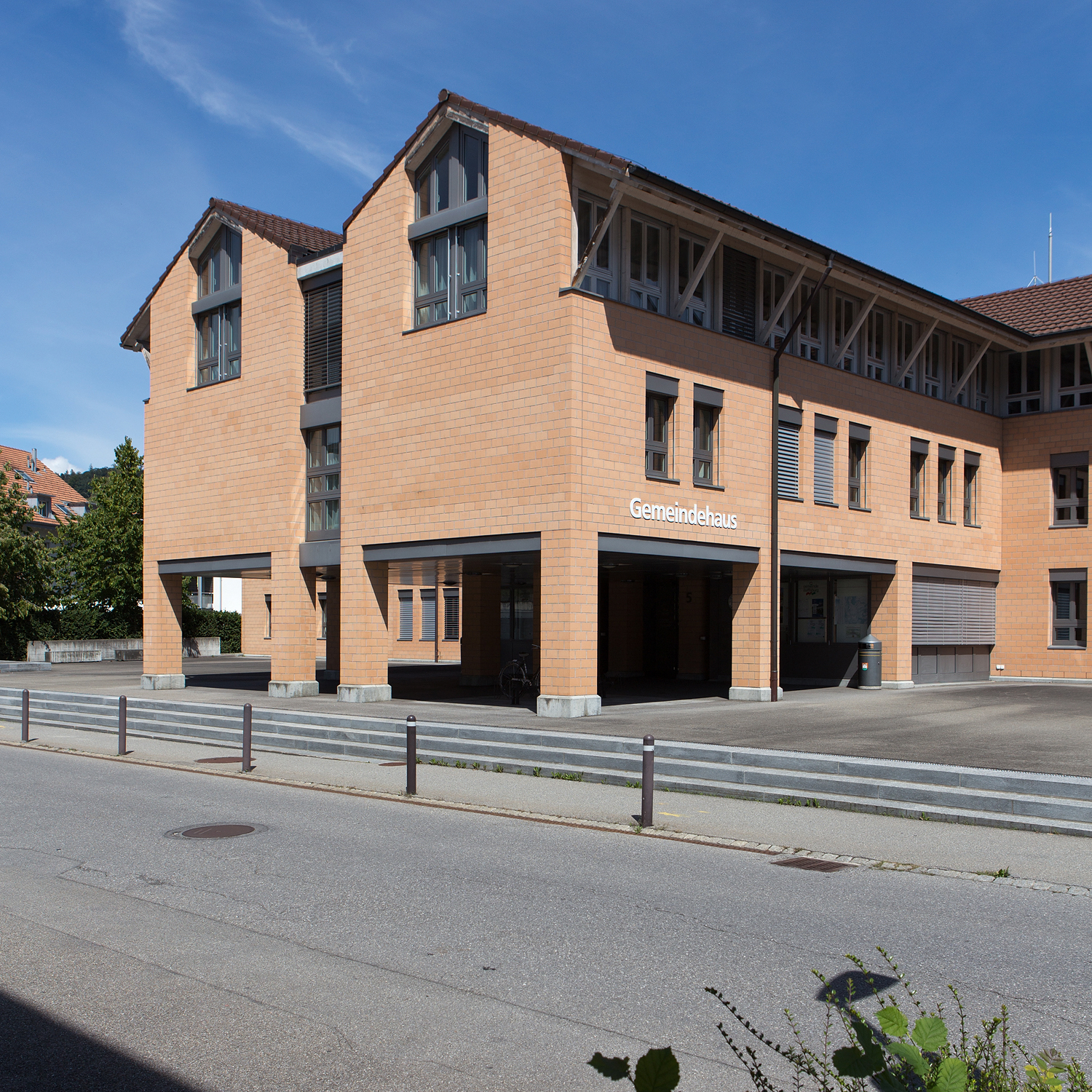
Municipal administration building

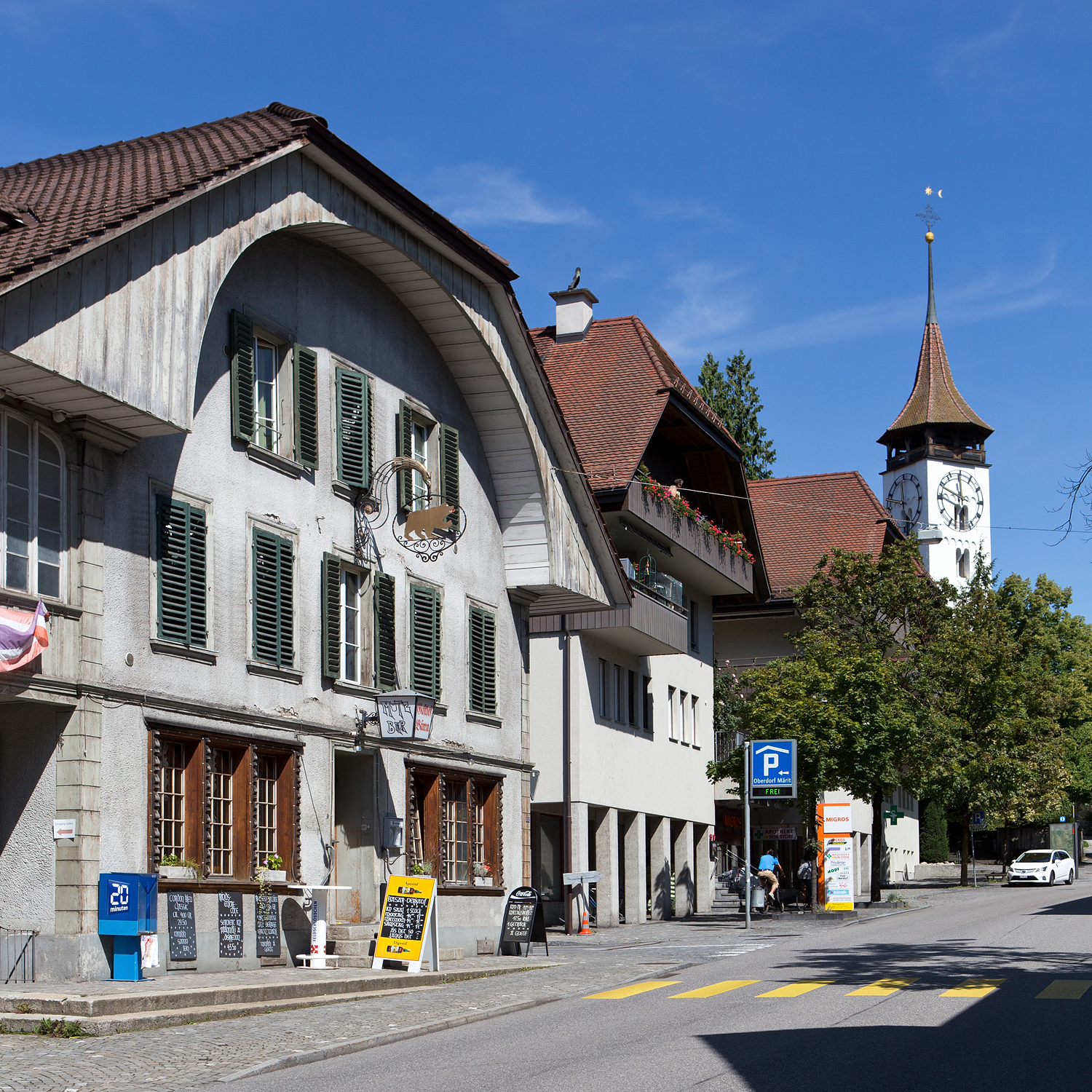
Medieval village center and parish church

Steffisburg has a population (as of December 2020) of 15,991. As of 2012, 10.0% of the population are resident foreign nationals. Between the last 2 years (2010-2012) the population changed at a rate of 0.5%. Migration accounted for 0.6%, while births and deaths accounted for -0.1%.

Most of the population (as of 2000) speaks German (13,274 or 92.5%) as their first language, Italian is the second most common (179 or 1.2%) and Albanian is the third (166 or 1.2%). There are 122 people who speak French and 6 people who speak Romansh.

As of 2008, the population was 47.8% male and 52.2% female. The population was made up of 6,614 Swiss men (42.9% of the population) and 767 (5.0%) non-Swiss men. There were 7,304 Swiss women (47.3%) and 746 (4.8%) non-Swiss women. Of the population in the municipality, 3,657 or about 25.5% were born in Steffisburg and lived there in 2000. There were 6,467 or 45.1% who were born in the same canton, while 1,904 or 13.3% were born somewhere else in Switzerland, and 1,611 or 11.2% were born outside of Switzerland.

As of 2012, children and teenagers (0–19 years old) make up 18.8% of the population, while adults (20–64 years old) make up 61.0% and seniors (over 64 years old) make up 20.3%.

As of 2000, there were 5,813 people who were single and never married in the municipality. There were 6,817 married individuals, 997 widows or widowers and 722 individuals who are divorced.

As of 2010, there were 2,422 households that consist of only one person and 329 households with five or more people. In 2000, a total of 6,157 apartments (91.7% of the total) were permanently occupied, while 408 apartments (6.1%) were seasonally occupied and 147 apartments (2.2%) were empty. As of 2012, the construction rate of new housing units was 5.2 new units per 1000 residents. The vacancy rate for the municipality, in 2013, was 0.3%. In 2012, single family homes made up 55.1% of the total housing in the municipality.

The historical population is given in the following chart:

== Economy ==
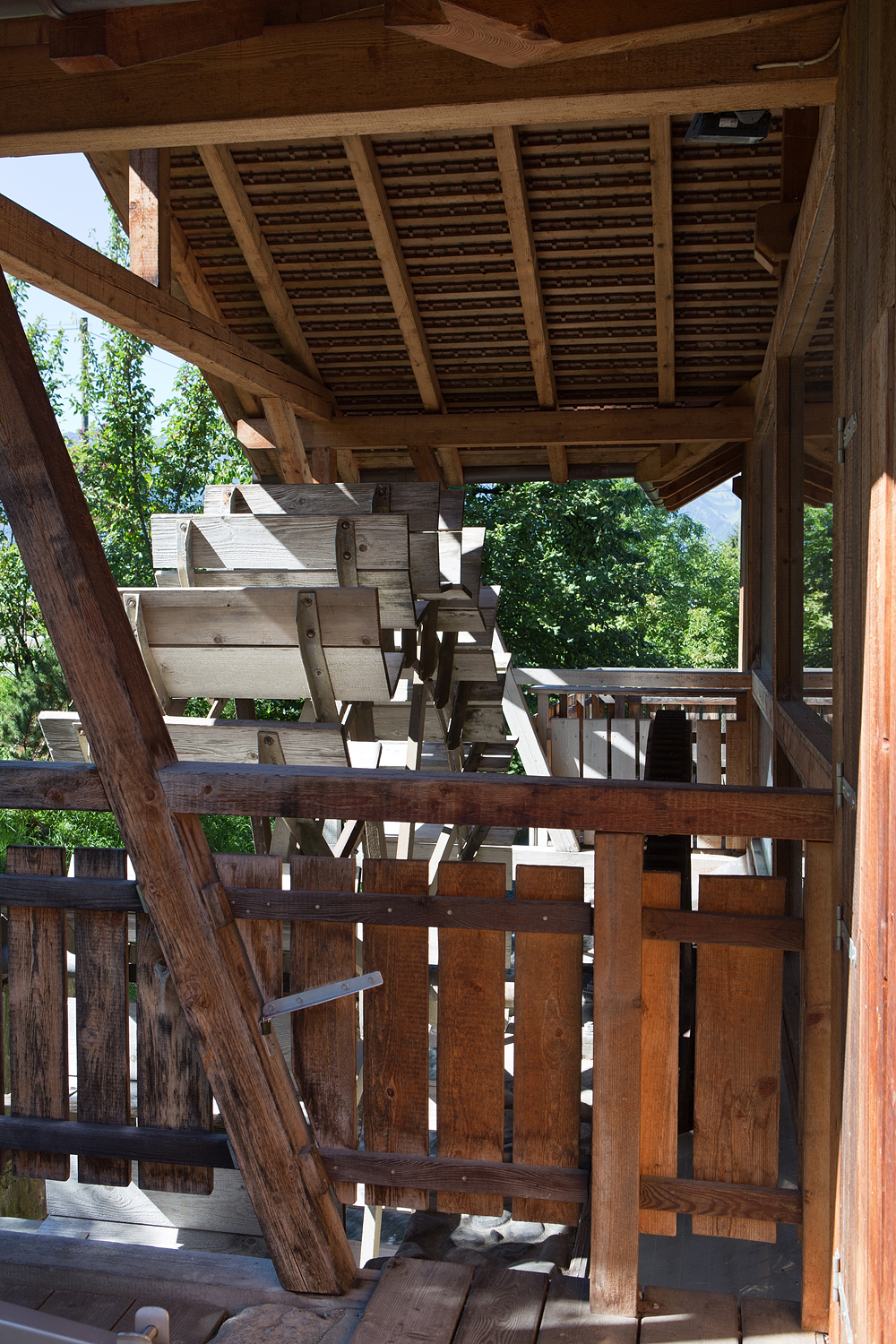
Historic sawmill in Steffisburg. The Zulg river provided power to many industries in the municipality

As of 2011, Steffisburg had an unemployment rate of 1.98%. As of 2011, there were a total of 5,673 people employed in the municipality. Of these, there were 164 people employed in the primary economic sector and about 54 businesses involved in this sector. The secondary sector employs 1,834 people and there were 142 businesses in this sector. The tertiary sector employs 3,675 people, with 631 businesses in this sector. There were 7,364 residents of the municipality who were employed in some capacity, of which females made up 44.7% of the workforce.

In 2008 there were a total of 4,000 full-time equivalent jobs. The number of jobs in the primary sector was 98, of which 95 were in agriculture and 3 were in forestry or lumber production. The number of jobs in the secondary sector was 1,821 of which 1,380 or (75.8%) were in manufacturing and 372 (20.4%) were in construction. The number of jobs in the tertiary sector was 2,081. In the tertiary sector; 666 or 32.0% were in wholesale or retail sales or the repair of motor vehicles, 35 or 1.7% were in the movement and storage of goods, 151 or 7.3% were in a hotel or restaurant, 32 or 1.5% were in the information industry, 59 or 2.8% were the insurance or financial industry, 133 or 6.4% were technical professionals or scientists, 169 or 8.1% were in education and 525 or 25.2% were in health care.

In 2000, there were 2,710 workers who commuted into the municipality and 5,328 workers who commuted away. The municipality is a net exporter of workers, with about 2.0 workers leaving the municipality for every one entering. A total of 2,034 workers (42.9% of the 4,744 total workers in the municipality) both lived and worked in Steffisburg. Of the working population, 19.6% used public transportation to get to work, and 47.1% used a private car.

The local and cantonal tax rate in Steffisburg is one of the lowest in the canton. In 2012 the average local and cantonal tax rate on a married resident, with two children, of Steffisburg making 150,000 CHF was 12%, while an unmarried resident's rate was 17.9%. For comparison, the average rate for the entire canton in 2011, was 14.2% and 22.0%, while the nationwide average was 12.3% and 21.1% respectively.

In 2010 there were a total of 7,299 tax payers in the municipality. Of that total, 2,371 made over 75,000 CHF per year. There were 50 people who made between 15,000 and 20,000 per year. The average income of the over 75,000 CHF group in Steffisburg was 115,452 CHF, while the average across all of Switzerland was 131,244 CHF.

In 2011 a total of 2.2% of the population received direct financial assistance from the government.

== Heritage site of national significance ==
The Former Regie of Steffisburg is listed as a Swiss heritage site of national significance.

== Politics ==
In the 2011 federal election the most popular party was the Swiss People's Party (SVP) which received 28.6% of the vote. The next three most popular parties were the Conservative Democratic Party (BDP) (15.5%), the Social Democratic Party (SP) (15.2%) and the Evangelical People's Party (EVP) (8.1%). In the federal election, a total of 5,925 votes were cast, and the voter turnout was 50.7%.

The Gemeinderat is the executive branch of the municipality of Steffisburg. Between 2011-2014 the break down by party was: 3 from the SVP, 2 from the SP, 1 from the FDP and 1 from the EVP. The mayor (as of 2014) is Jürg Marti (SVP).

The Grosse Gemeinderat is the legislative branch of the municipality. It is composed of 34 members and is elected by the voters every four years. The chart below shows the current distribution of seats of the community council (as of September 2014).

Composition of the Grosse Gemeinderat in Steffisburg as of 2014
| Parties | Ideology | Seats |
|---|---|---|
| Social Democratic Party (SP) | Social democracy | 7 |
| Swiss People's Party (SVP) | National conservatism | 10 |
| FDP.The Liberals (FDP) | Classical liberalism | 5 |
| Evangelical People's Party (EVP) | Christian democracy | 3 |
| Federal Democratic Union of Switzerland (EDU) | Christian right | 3 |
| Conservative Democratic Party (BDP) | Conservatism / Economic liberalism | 3 |
| Green Liberal Party (GLP) | Green liberalism | 2 |
| Green Party (GPS) | Green politics | 1 |
| Total | | 34 |

== Religion ==
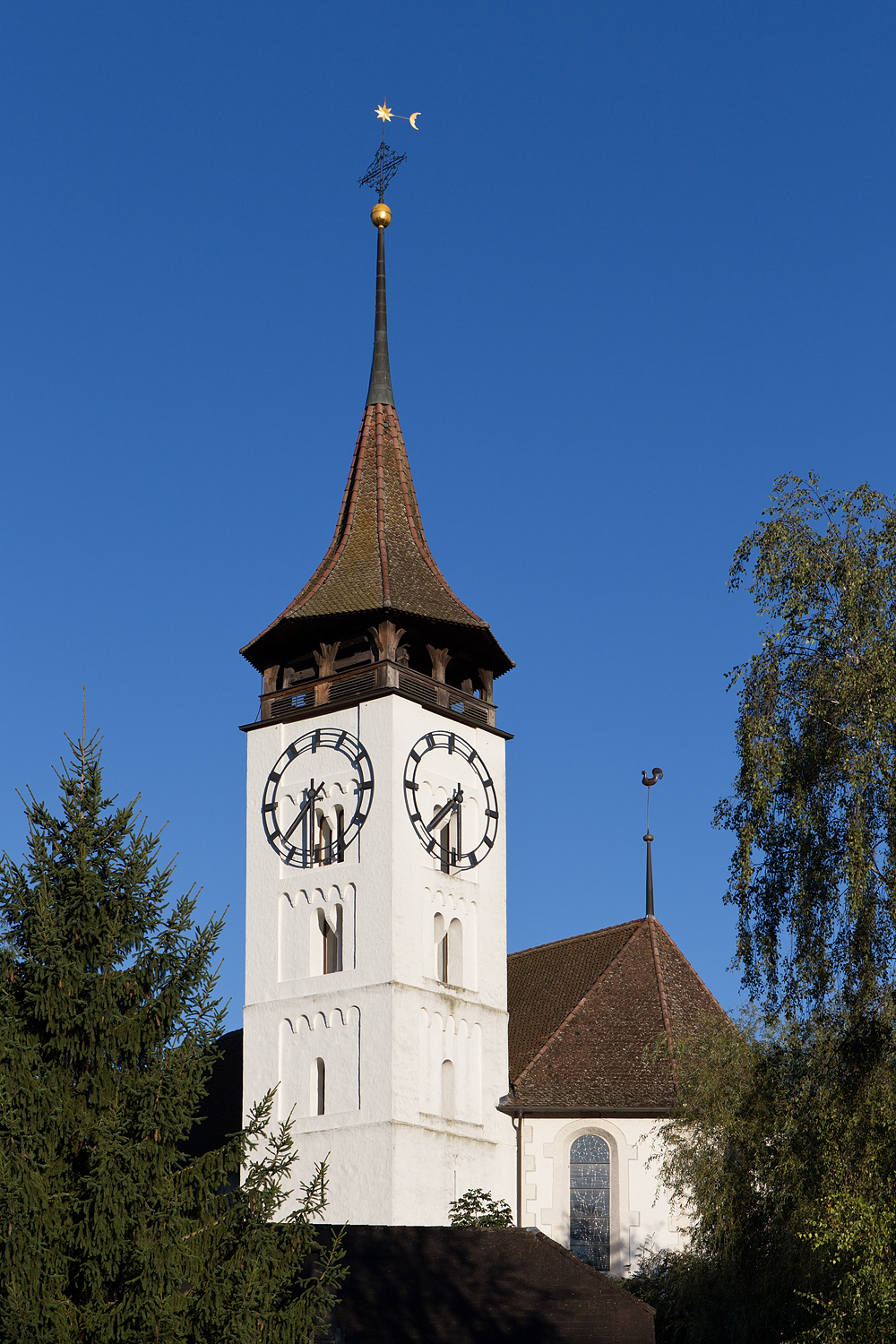
Steffisburg parish church

From the 2000 census, 9,786 or 68.2% belonged to the Swiss Reformed Church, while 1,778 or 12.4% were Roman Catholic. Of the rest of the population, there were 136 members of an Orthodox church (or about 0.95% of the population), there were 18 individuals (or about 0.13% of the population) who belonged to the Christian Catholic Church, and there were 806 individuals (or about 5.62% of the population) who belonged to another Christian church. There were 8 individuals (or about 0.06% of the population) who were Jewish, and 333 (or about 2.32% of the population) who were Muslim. There were 37 individuals who were Buddhist, 49 individuals who were Hindu and 20 individuals who belonged to another church. 923 (or about 6.43% of the population) belonged to no church, are agnostic or atheist, and 455 individuals (or about 3.17% of the population) did not answer the question.

== Education ==
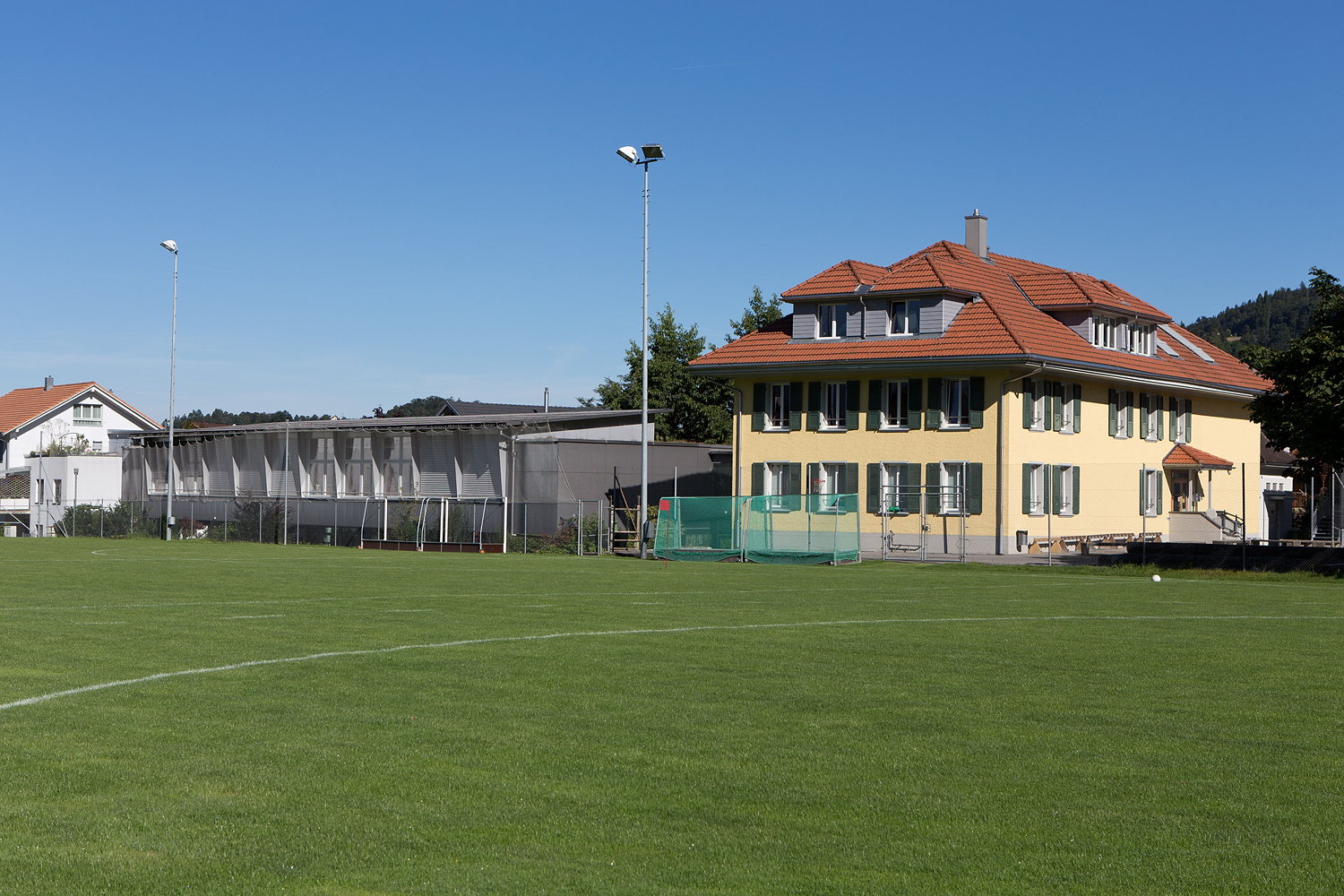
Erlen school house in Steffisburg

In Steffisburg about 59.6% of the population have completed non-mandatory upper secondary education, and 17.7% have completed additional higher education (either university or a Fachhochschule). Of the 1,606 who had completed some form of tertiary schooling listed in the census, 75.7% were Swiss men, 18.9% were Swiss women, 4.0% were non-Swiss men and 1.4% were non-Swiss women.

The Canton of Bern school system provides one year of non-obligatory Kindergarten, followed by six years of Primary school. This is followed by three years of obligatory lower Secondary school where the students are separated according to ability and aptitude. Following the lower Secondary students may attend additional schooling or they may enter an apprenticeship.

During the 2012–13 school year, there were a total of 1,603 students attending classes in Steffisburg. There were a total of 236 students in the German language kindergarten classes in the municipality. Of the kindergarten students, 13.1% were permanent or temporary residents of Switzerland (not citizens) and 17.8% have a different mother language than the classroom language. The municipality's primary school had 882 students in German language classes. Of the primary students, 14.4% were permanent or temporary residents of Switzerland (not citizens) and 16.9% have a different mother language than the classroom language. During the same year, the lower secondary school had a total of 485 students. There were 11.8% who were permanent or temporary residents of Switzerland (not citizens) and 17.9% have a different mother language than the classroom language.

As of 2000, there were a total of 1,739 students attending any school in the municipality. Of those, 1,481 both lived and attended school in the municipality, while 258 students came from another municipality. During the same year, 309 residents attended schools outside the municipality.

Steffisburg is home to the Gemeindebiblothek library. The library has (as of 2008) 10,373 books or other media, and loaned out 31,200 items in the same year. It was open a total of 260 days with average of 15 hours per week during that year.

== Transportation ==
The municipality has two railway stations, Schwäbis and Steffisburg, on the Burgdorf–Thun line. Between them there is regular service to Thun, Konolfingen, and Solothurn.

== Notable people ==
- Otto Lanz (1865 in Steffisburg – 1935) a Swiss surgeon, specialised in the thyroid gland and with appendicitis
- Ana-Maria Crnogorčević (born 1990 in Steffisburg) a Swiss footballer
- Colin Trachsel (born 1997 in Steffisburg) a Swiss footballer who plays for FC Thun II
