= Otto Lanz =

Swiss surgeon

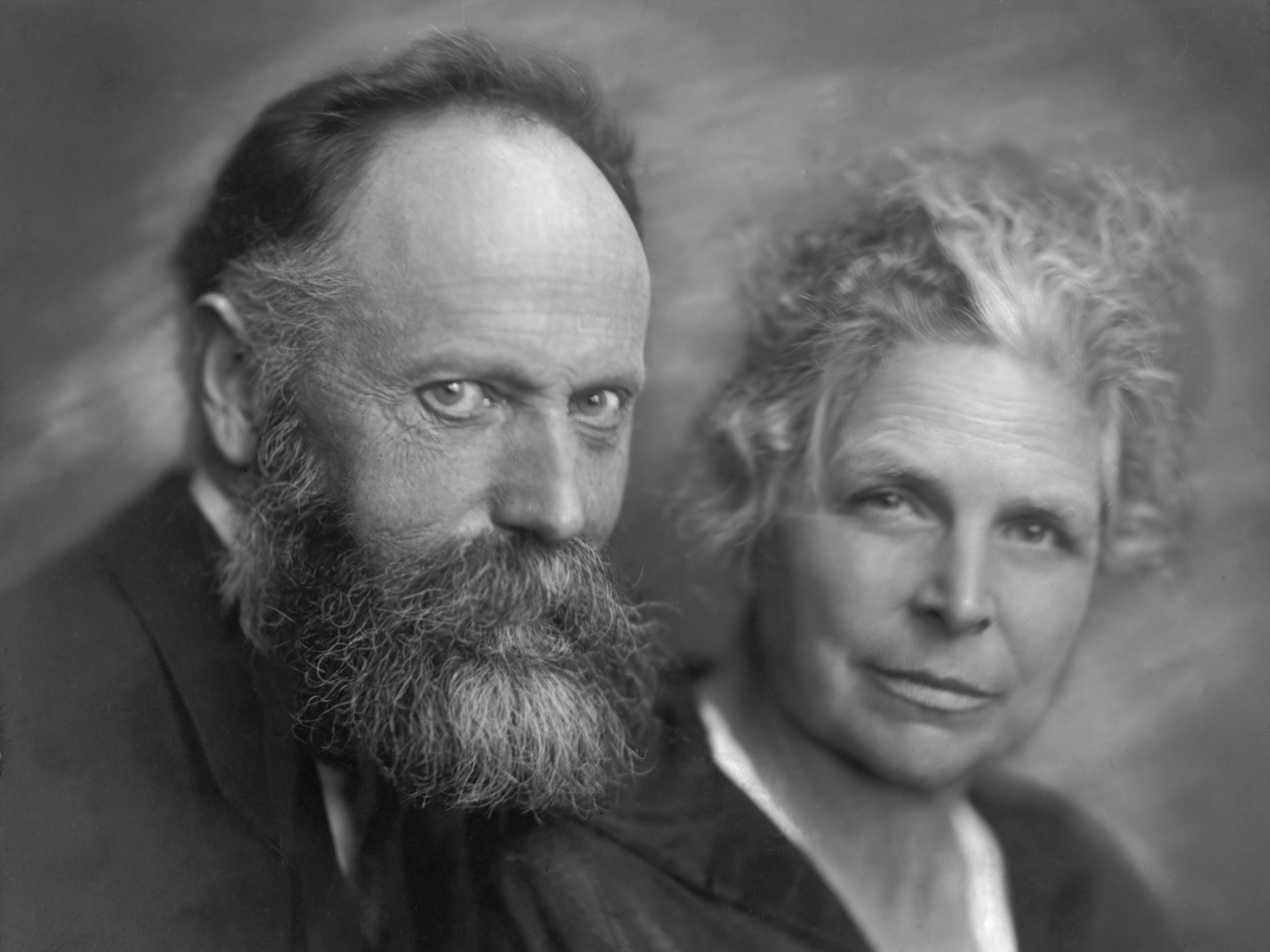
Otto Lanz and his wife Anna Willi (1927)

Otto Lanz (14 October 1865, in Steffisburg – 23 March 1935, in Amsterdam) was a Swiss surgeon.

He studied medicine at several universities in Europe, and in 1890–92 served as an assistant to Theodor Kocher at the University of Bern. Afterwards, he took an extended study trip to Berlin, Naples and London, and in 1894 settled as a docent of surgery at Bern. In 1902 he was named a professor of surgery at the University of Amsterdam.

He is remembered for his surgery of the thyroid gland and his work associated with appendicitis. In the field of plastic surgery, he introduced mesh grafting in 1907.

He was a collector of Italian Renaissance art, part of which, was on display at the Rijksmuseum in Amsterdam. In 1941 his widow sold the collection to Adolf Hitler, who acquired it for his proposed Führermuseum in Linz. After the war, the collection was returned to the Netherlands.

== Medical terms ==
- Lanz incision: A specific type of abdominal incision; considered to be a cosmetic improvement over McBurney's incision.
- Lanz' point: A location in the lower abdomen sensitive to pressure in appendicitis.

== Selected works ==
- Chirurgische Klinik von Prof. Dr. Kocher zu Bern (Summer semester 1891, edited by Otto Lanz and Fritz de Quervain).
- Beiträge zur Schilddrüsenfrage, 1895 – Contributions to thyroid issues.
- Die Transplantation betreffend, 1908 – On transplantation.
