= 2017–18 Swiss Cup =

Tournament details
- Country: Switzerland
- Teams: 64

Final positions
- Champions: FC Zürich
- Runners-up: BSC Young Boys

The 2017–18 Swiss Cup is the 93rd season of Switzerland's annual football cup competition. The competition started on 12 August 2017 with the first games of Round 1 and ended on 27 May 2018 with the final. FC Basel were the defending champions, but were eliminated in the semi-finals by BSC Young Boys.

== Participating clubs ==
All teams from 2015–16 Super League and 2015–16 Challenge League as well as the top 4 teams from 2016–17 Promotion League automatically entered this year's competition. The remaining 41 teams had to qualify through separate qualifying rounds within their leagues. Reserve teams and teams from Liechtenstein are not allowed in the competition, the latter only enter the 2017–18 Liechtenstein Cup.

**2017–18 Super League**; 10 teams	**2017–18 Challenge League**; 9 teams	**2017–18 Promotion League**; 9 teams	**2017–18 1. Liga**; 9 teams	**2017–18 2. Liga Interregional**; 14 teams	**2017–18 Regional leagues** 13 teams
FC Basel ^{TH} (BS); Grasshopper Zürich (ZH); FC Lausanne-Sport (VD); FC Lugano (TI); FC Luzern (LU); FC Sion (VS); FC St. Gallen (SG); FC Thun (BE); **BSC Young Boys** (BE); **FC Zürich** (ZH)	FC Aarau (AG); FC Chiasso (TI); Neuchâtel Xamax FCS (NE); FC Rapperswil-Jona (SG); FC Schaffhausen (SH); Servette FC (GE); FC Wil (SG); FC Winterthur (ZH); FC Wohlen (AG)	FC Bavois (VD); FC Breitenrain (BE); SC Brühl (SG); FC Köniz (BE); SC Kriens (LU); BSC Old Boys (BS); FC Stade-Lausanne-Ouchy (VD); FC Stade Nyonnais (VD); SC YF Juventus (ZH)	FC Baden (AG); FC Bassecourt (JU); SR Delémont (JU); SC Düdingen (FR); FC Échallens Région (VD); FC Kosova (ZH); FC Münsingen (BE); FC Schötz (LU); FC Wettswil-Bonstetten (ZH)	FC Altdorf (UR); FC Biel-Bienne (BE); FC Bulle (FR); FC Chippis (VS); FC Hergiswil (NW); CS Interstar (GE); FC Kreuzlingen (TG); FC Linth 04 (GL); FC Locarno (TI); NK Pajde (AG); CS Romontois (FR); FC Rüti (ZH); FC Stade-Payerne (VD); AC Taverne (TI)	**Sixth tier**: FC Arbon 05 (TG); FC Bassersdorf (ZH); FC Bellach (SO); FC Béroche-Gorgier (NE); FC Concordia Basel (BS); FC Gambarogno-Contone (TI); FC Gränichen (AG); ES FC Malley (VD); FC Vernier (GE); FC Wängi (TG); FC Wyler (BE); **Seventh tier**: FC Hausen Am Albis (ZH); **Ninth tier**: FC US Montfaucon (JU)

Teams in bold are still active in the competition.

^{TH} Title holders.

== Round 1 ==
Teams from Super League and Challenge League were seeded in this round. In a match, the home advantage was granted to the team from the lower league, if applicable. Teams in bold continue to the next round of the competition.

Team 1	Score	Team 2
**12 August 2017**
FC US Montfaucon (9)	0–21	**Neuchâtel Xamax FCS** (2)
**FC Bassersdorf** (6)	2–1	AC Taverne (5)
FC Stade-Payerne (5)	1–2	**FC Thun** (1)
SC Brühl (3)	0–1	**FC Chiasso** (2)
**FC Biel-Bienne** (5)	3–1	FC Bavois (3)
FC Breitenrain (3)	0–3	**BSC Young Boys** (1)
FC Altdorf (5)	0–6	**Servette FC** (2)
**FC Linth 04** (5)	4–0	FC Wohlen (2)
FC Vernier (6)	0–3	**FC Stade Nyonnais** (3)
SC Kriens (3)	0–1	**FC Luzern** (1)
FC Arbon 05 (6)	0–7	**FC Wil** (2)
FC Bellach (6)	0–4	**FC Köniz** (3)
FC Concordia Basel (6)	2–7	**BSC Old Boys** (3)
ES FC Malley (6)	0–14	**FC Stade-Lausanne-Ouchy** (3)
FC Wängi (6)	0–1	**SR Delémont** (4)
FC Hausen Am Albis (7)	1–5	**FC Hergiswil** (5)
FC Bassecourt (4)	0–6	**FC Lugano** (1)
CS Interstar (5)	6–7	**FC Schötz** (4)
NK Pajde (5)	1–3	**FC Lausanne-Sport** (1)
**13 August 2017**
FC Gränichen (6)	1–9	**FC Sion** (1)
FC Wettswil-Bonstetten (4)	0–2	**FC Basel** (1)
FC Chippis (5)	0–10	**FC Zürich** (1)
FC Kreuzlingen (5)	3–4	**FC Rapperswil-Jona** (2)
**FC Münsingen** (4)	5–1	SC Düdingen (4)
CS Romontois (5)	0–10	**Grasshopper Club Zürich** (1)
FC Rüti (5)	0–5	**FC Schaffhausen** (2)
FC Bulle (5)	1–2	**SC YF Juventus** (3)
FC Béroche-Gorgier (6)	1–4	**FC Kosova** (4)
FC Wyler (6)	2–2 (4–5 p)	**FC Locarno** (5)
**FC Échallens Région** (4)	2–1	FC Aarau (2)
FC Baden (4)	3–8	**FC St. Gallen** (1)
FC Gambarogno-Contone (6)	1–6	**FC Winterthur** (2)

Source: Swiss Football Association

== Round 2 ==
Team 1	Score	Team 2
15 September 2017
FC Hergiswil (5)	1–3	FC Schötz (4)
16 September 2017
SC YF Juventus (3)	1–3	FC Lausanne-Sport (1)
FC Stade-Lausanne-Ouchy (3)	2–1 (a.e.t.)	FC Sion (1)
FC Bassersdorf (6)	0–3	FC Zürich (1)
FC Münsingen (4)	1–0	FC Schaffhausen (2)
Servette FC (2)	0–1	FC Luzern (1)
FC Kosova (4)	1–3	FC Rapperswil-Jona (2)
FC Locarno (5)	1–4	FC Stade Nyonnais (3)
17 September 2017
FC Linth 04 (5)	1–1 (4–5 p)	FC St. Gallen (1)
SR Delémont (4)	4–2	FC Winterthur (2)
FC Köniz (3)	0–1	FC Lugano (1)
BSC Old Boys (3)	0–4	BSC Young Boys (1)
FC Wil (2)	0–3	FC Thun (1)
FC Biel-Bienne (5)	0–5	Grasshopper Club Zürich (1)
FC Échallens Région (4)	3–2 (a.e.t.)	Neuchâtel Xamax FCS (2)
FC Chiasso (2)	0–1	FC Basel (1)

Source: Swiss Football Association

== Round 3 ==
Team 1	Score	Team 2
24 October 2017
FC Stade-Lausanne-Ouchy (3)	1–4	FC Zürich (1)
25 October 2017
FC Stade Nyonnais (3)	1–3	FC Thun (1)
FC Münsingen (4)	0–3	BSC Young Boys (1)
FC Rapperswil-Jona (2)	1–2	FC Basel (1)
FC Lausanne-Sport (1)	0–1	Grasshopper Club Zürich (1)
26 October 2017
FC Schötz (4)	2–3 (a.e.t.)	FC Lugano (1)
FC Échallens Région (4)	2–3	FC Luzern (1)
SR Delémont (4)	1–2	FC St. Gallen (1)

Source: Swiss Football Association

== Quarter-finals ==
The matches were played on 29 and 30 November 2017.

29 November 2017	FC Zürich	4–3	FC Thun	Zürich
19:30	Dwamena (yellow card) 25'; Koné 51'; Frey 84', 90+3'; Rasmus Thelander 90'	Report	9' Sorgić; 24', 77' Rapp; (yellow card) 31' Hediger; (yellow card) 80' Bürgy; (yellow card) 85' Ruberto	Stadium: Letzigrund; Attendance: 4,663; Referee: (Switzerland) Nikolaj Hänni (Gams SG)

29 November 2017	FC Basel	2–1	FC Luzern	Basel
19:30	Lang 13', 52'; Elyounoussi (yellow card) 41'	Report	22' Schürpf; (yellow card) 41' Silvan Sidler; (yellow card) 60' Voca; (yellow card) 77' Schulz	Stadium: St. Jakob-Park; Attendance: 7,715; Referee: (Switzerland) Sandro Schärer Buttikon

30 November 2017	BSC Young Boys	2–1	FC St. Gallen	Bern
20:15	13', 64' Assalé; Mbabu (yellow card) 33'; Sulejmani (yellow card) 44'; Schick (yellow card) 90+2'	Report	(yellow card) 43' Lüchinger; 85' (yellow card) 59' Haggui	Stadium: Stade de Suisse; Attendance: 7,521; Referee: (Switzerland) Stephan Klossner

30 November 2017	FC Lugano	0–0 (a.e.t.) (1–3 p)	Grasshopper Club Zürich	Lugano
20:15	Gerndt (yellow card) 41'; Sabbatini (yellow card) 51'; Ledesma (yellow card) 55'; Bottani (yellow card) 113'	Report	(yellow card) 100' Avdijaj	Stadium: Cornaredo Stadium; Attendance: 1,590; Referee: (Switzerland) Alain Bieri (Solothurn)
	Penalties
	Sabbatini (penalty missed); Mariani (penalty missed); Čulina (penalty scored); Ledesma (penalty missed)		(penalty missed) Bašić; (penalty scored) Vilotić; (penalty scored) Andersen; (penalty scored) Bergström

== Semi-finals ==
The winners of Quarter finals play in the Semi finals, there is no home advantage granted in the draw. Matches will be played on 27 and 28 February 2018.

27 February 2018	BSC Young Boys	2–0	FC Basel	Bern
20:15	Hoarau 55' (pen.); Suchý 65' (o.g.)	Report		Stadium: Stade de Suisse; Attendance: 23,519; Referee: Stephan Klossner

28 February 2018	FC Zürich	2–1	Grasshopper Club Zürich	Zürich
20:15	Rüegg 22'; Brunner 90+1'	Report	Lavanchy 11'	Stadium: Letzigrund; Attendance: 15,664; Referee: Fedayi San

== Final ==
The winners of the semifinals play in the Final. The match will be played on 27 May 2018 at the Stade de Suisse in Bern.

27 May 2018	Zürich	2–1	Young Boys	Bern
14:00 (CEST)	Frey 11' (yellow card) 24'; Sarr (yellow card) 59' (yellow-red card) 67'; Marchesano 75'; Thelander (yellow card) 83'; Brecher (yellow card) 89'	Report	Nuhu (yellow card) 15'; Sanogo (yellow card) 24'; Sulejmani 80'	Stadium: Stade de Suisse; Attendance: 30,000; Referee: Adrien Jaccottet
