= Nicolas Hunziker =

Swiss footballer (born 1996)

Personal information
- Full name: Nicolas Hunziker
- Date of birth: 23 February 1996 (age 30)
- Place of birth: Büsserach, Switzerland
- Height: 1.80 m (5 ft 11 in)
- Position: Forward

Youth career
- 2002–2008: Breitenbach
- 2008–2016: Basel

Senior career*
Years	Team	Apps	(Gls)
2015–2017	Basel	3	(0)
2016–2017	→ Grasshopper (loan)	14	(1)
2017–2019	Thun	38	(3)
2020	Baden	0	(0)

International career
2011	Switzerland U-15	2	(0)
2011–2012	Switzerland U-16	7	(5)
2012–2014	Switzerland U-17	10	(3)
2014–2015	Switzerland U-19	7	(11)
2015–2016	Switzerland U-20	7	(1)
2016–2017	Switzerland U-21	5	(2)
- * Club domestic league appearances and goals

Nicolas Hunziker (born 23 February 1996) is a retired Swiss footballer who played as a forward.

Hunziker grew up Büsserach and because there is no football club in the small village he played his early football with local amateur club FC Breitenbach in the neighbouring village. FC Basel scouted him in 2007 and after a trainings week he joined Basel's youth section in 2008. Hunziker advanced through the ranks regularly and was soon called up to the represent Switzerland at youth level.

For the season 2014–15 he advanced to Basel's U-21 team, who played in the Promotion League, the third tier of Swiss football and played for them regularly. After having played in two test games Hunziker played his debut for the first team in the Swiss Cup game on 15 August 2015 as Basel won 4–0 against FC Meyrin. On 29 February 2016 Hunziker extended his professional contract with the club and he joined Basel's first team for the remainder of their 2015–16 season under head coach Urs Fischer. Hunziker played his domestic league debut for the club in the away game on 13 April as Basel won 4–1 against Lugano coming in as substitute.

Hunziker had had three short appearances with the first team that season and won the 2015–16 Super League championship. However, then he was loaned to Grasshopper Club for the following season and here he was able to gain match practice in fourteen league games, scoring one goal.

After his loan period he did not return to Basel but he moved on. During his short period with their first team, Hunziker played a total of 12 games for Basel without scoring a goal. Three of these games were in the Swiss Super League, one in the Swiss Cup and eight were friendly games.

On 1 June 2017, Basel announced that Hunziker had signed a three-year contract for Thun. Hunziker did not play regularly, mainly due to injuries. However one match is notable for the player, on 6 May 2018 he was substituted in during the match against Grasshopper Club. Hunziker scored two goals within a matter of minutes to turn the game into a 2–1 victory after being a goal down as he came on.

On 11 September 2019 FC Thun announced, the contract with Hunziker, which would have been valid until the following summer, was terminated early. Due to various long-term injuries, the center forward had never fully been able to demonstrate his talent.

He later joined Baden to keep fit, but could not advance to their first team. On 18 August 2020 the then 24-year old Hunziker announced his retirement from professional football due to his constant injuries.

Hunziker has completed various junior international matches from the U-15 to the Swiss U-21 team. His last match for the U-21 was on 5 September 2017.
