= Manuel Sutter =

Austrian footballer

Personal information
- Date of birth: 8 March 1991 (age 35)
- Place of birth: Bregenz, Austria
- Height: 1.77 m (5 ft 9 1/2 in)
- Position: Forward

Team information
- Current team: Balzers
- Number: 9

Youth career
- 1999–2005: FC Wolfurt
- 2005–2009: AKA Vorarlberg

Senior career*
Years	Team	Apps	(Gls)
2009–2013	St. Gallen	49	(4)
2013–2016	Vaduz	66	(15)
2016–2018	Winterthur	66	(8)
2019–2023	Vaduz	138	(16)
2023–	Balzers	4	(0)

International career
2007–2008	Austria U17	2	(0)
2008–2009	Austria U18	3	(0)
2009	Austria U19	1	(0)
- * Club domestic league appearances and goals as of 2 September 2023

Manuel Sutter (born 8 March 1991) is an Austrian professional footballer who plays as a forward for Liechtensteiner club Balzers in the Swiss fourth-tier 1. Liga.

== Club career ==
On 1 July 2023, Sutter signed with Balzers.
