= Luca Crescenzi =

Italian football player

Personal information
- Full name: Luca Andrea Crescenzi
- Date of birth: 2 April 1992 (age 34)
- Place of birth: Rome, Italy
- Height: 1.88 m (6 ft 2 in)
- Position: Defender

Youth career
- Lazio

Senior career*
Years	Team	Apps	(Gls)
2011–2015	Lazio	0	(0)
2012–2013	→ Nocerina (loan)	13	(0)
2013	→ Viareggio (loan)	5	(0)
2013–2014	→ Siena (loan)	6	(0)
2014	→ Pisa (loan)	4	(0)
2014–2015	→ Reggina (loan)	13	(0)
2015	→ Arezzo (loan)	4	(0)
2015–2017	Pisa	34	(2)
2017–2018	Lugano	0	(0)
2017–2018	→ Vicenza (loan)	31	(0)
2018–2019	Pro Vercelli	26	(1)
2019–2022	Como	45	(0)
2022–2023	Siena	30	(0)
2023–2025	Padova	19	(0)
2025	Latina	5	(0)

International career
2011	Italy U-20	1	(0)
- * Club domestic league appearances and goals

Luca Andrea Crescenzi (born 2 April 1992) is an Italian former footballer who played as a defender.

== Club career ==
He made his professional debut in the Lega Pro for Nocerina on 9 September 2012 in a game against Prato.

He joined Lugano in 2017.

On 2 September 2019, he signed a 2-year contract with Como.

On 31 January 2022, Crescenzi signed a contract with Siena until 30 June 2023.

On 14 July 2023, Crescenzi moved to Padova on a two-year deal.

== Honours ==
=== Club ===
Como

- Serie C: 2020–21 (Group A)
