= Colin Trachsel =

Swiss footballer (born 1997)

Personal information
- Full name: Colin Trachsel
- Date of birth: 28 September 1997 (age 29)
- Place of birth: Steffisburg, Switzerland
- Height: 1.77 m (5 ft 10 in)
- Position: Left back

Team information
- Current team: Köniz
- Number: 72

Youth career
- FC Steffisburg
- Thun

Senior career*
Years	Team	Apps	(Gls)
2014–2019	Thun II	49	(3)
2015–2019	Thun	4	(0)
2017	→ Rapperswil-Jona (loan)	1	(0)
2019	→ Köniz (loan)	7	(0)
2019–	Köniz	2	(0)
- * Club domestic league appearances and goals as of 13:09, 20 November 2019 (UTC)

Colin Trachsel (born 28 September 1997) is a Swiss footballer who plays for FC Köniz on loan from FC Thun II.

== Career ==
In February 2019, Trachsel was loaned out from FC Thun to FC Köniz for the rest of the season. The deal was made permanent at the end of the season.
