= Gabriel Lüchinger =

Swiss footballer (born 1992)

Personal information
- Full name: Gabriel Lüchinger
- Date of birth: 18 December 1992 (age 33)
- Place of birth: Altstätten, Switzerland
- Height: 1.72 m (5 ft 7 1/2 in)
- Position: Attacking midfielder

Senior career*
Years	Team	Apps	(Gls)
2009–2011	Grasshoppers II	10	(1)
2011	→ FC St. Gallen II (loan)	13	(5)
2011–2014	FC St. Gallen II	46	(4)
2011–2013	FC St. Gallen	1	(0)
2012–2013	FC Wil	22	(3)
2015–2016	FC Balzers	24	(8)
2016–2017	SC Rheindorf Altach II	26	(18)
2016–2017	SC Rheindorf Altach	2	(0)
2017–2018	SV Ried	2	(0)
2017–2018	SV Ried II	7	(3)
2018	→ Blau-Weiß Linz (loan)	16	(6)
2018–2022	FC Vaduz	112	(10)
2022–2023	Apollon Smyrnis	6	(0)

International career
2007	Switzerland U-15	4	(2)
2007–2008	Switzerland U-16	6	(1)
2008–2009	Switzerland U-17	4	(2)
- * Club domestic league appearances and goals

Gabriel Lüchinger (born 18 December 1992) is a Swiss professional footballer who plays as a midfielder.
