= Fuad Rahimi =

Kosovan footballer (born 1998)

Personal information
- Date of birth: 11 April 1998 (age 28)
- Place of birth: Uzwil, Switzerland
- Height: 1.87 m (6 ft 2 in)
- Position: Defender

Team information
- Current team: SC Brühl
- Number: 5

Youth career
- 2013–2015: Wil
- 2015–2017: St. Gallen

Senior career*
Years	Team	Apps	(Gls)
2017–2020	Wil	62	(1)
2020–2024	Vaduz	45	(4)
2024–	SC Brühl	60	(1)

International career
2018–2020	Kosovo U21	5	(0)
- * Club domestic league appearances and goals as of 28 September 2026

Fuad Rahimi (born 11 April 1998) is a professional footballer who plays as a defender for Swiss Promotion League club SC Brühl. Born in Switzerland, Rahimi is a youth international for Kosovo.

== Career ==
Rahimi began his senior career with Wil, before joining Vaduz on 14 January 2020. Rahimi made his professional debut with Vaduz in a 1–1 Swiss Super League tie with FC Lugano on 17 October 2020. After establishing himself in the first team, he signed a new 2-year contract in November 2021.
