= Daniel Follonier =

Swiss footballer (born 1994)

Personal information
- Date of birth: 18 January 1994 (age 32)
- Place of birth: Sierre, Switzerland
- Height: 1.84 m (6 ft 0 in)
- Position: Winger

Youth career
- 2008–2014: Sion

Senior career*
Years	Team	Apps	(Gls)
2012–2016	Sion U21	57	(18)
2014–2017	Sion	52	(9)
2017–2021	Luzern	14	(1)
2018–2019	→ Servette (loan)	30	(3)
2019–2021	→ Kriens (loan)	28	(6)
2022–2023	Cham	28	(3)

International career
2011–2012	Switzerland U-18	4	(1)
- * Club domestic league appearances and goals as of 26 October 2023

Daniel Follonier (born 18 January 1994) is a Swiss footballer who plays as a winger.

== Club career ==
Follonier is a youth exponent from Sion and started playing for their Under-21 squad in the fourth-tier 1. Liga in the 2011–12 season. He made his Swiss Super League debut at 18 May 2014 against Grasshopper in 3-1 home win. In July 2018, after appearing in 14 matches and having scored 1 goal for Luzern, he signed for Servette on loan.

On 2 October 2023, Follonier and SC Cham terminated the contract for personal reasons.

== Honours ==
Sion

- Swiss Cup: 2014–15
