= Gion Chande =

Mozambican footballer (born 1998)

Personal information
- Full name: Gion Fadri Chande
- Date of birth: 3 May 1998 (age 28)
- Place of birth: Thusis, Switzerland
- Height: 1.85 m (6 ft 1 in)
- Position: Goalkeeper

Youth career
- 2005–2008: FC Thusis/Cazis
- 2008–2010: Team Graubünden
- 2010–2013: St. Gallen
- 2013–2016: Basel

Senior career*
Years	Team	Apps	(Gls)
2016–2018	Basel U21	13	(0)
2016	→ Vaduz II	8	(0)
2017	→ Grasshoppers U21 (loan)	9	(0)
2016–2018	Wil II	8	(0)
2018–2023	Vaduz	5	(0)
2024	Wil	2	(0)

International career^{‡}
2012–2013	Switzerland U15	4	(0)
2013–2014	Switzerland U16	4	(0)
2014–2015	Switzerland U17	3	(0)
2015–2016	Switzerland U18	2	(0)
2016–2017	Switzerland U19	1	(0)
2017–2018	Switzerland U20	1	(0)
2023–	Mozambique	1	(0)
- * Club domestic league appearances and goals as of 28 May 2024 ‡ National team caps and goals as of 18:49, 1 April 2023 (UTC)

Gion Fadri Chande (born 3 May 1998) is a footballer who plays as a goalkeeper. Born in Switzerland, he plays for the Mozambique national team.

== Career ==
Chande is a youth product of his local clubs FC Thusis/Cazis and Team Graubünden, before spending time with St. Gallen, and finally joining the youth academy of Basel in 2013 to finish his development. He began his senior career in 2016 on loan to the reserves of Vaduz for the first half of the 2017–17 season, and in 2017 moved to Grasshoppers' reserves for the second half; at both clubs, he was also the third goalkeeper for their main squads. He returned to Basel for the 2017–18 season where he played for their U21s, but managed to appear on their main squad's bench a couple of times in the season due to injuries to other goalkeepers ahead of him.

In the summer of 2018, he moved to Wil where he was again a reserve goalkeeper. He transferred to the Liechtenstein club FC Vaduz in May 2019, and helped the club achieve promotion to the Swiss Super League. In February 2021, he extended his contract with the club for 2 more years. On 19 December 2021, he finally made his senior and professional debut as a late substitute in a 3–2 Swiss Challenge League win over FC Winterthur.

== International career ==
Chande was born in Switzerland to a Mozambican father and a Swiss mother. He was a youth international for Switzerland, having played all levels up to the Switzerland U20s. He was called up to the senior Mozambique national team for a set of 2023 Africa Cup of Nations qualification matches in March 2023. He debuted with Mozambique in a 5–1 loss to Senegal on 24 March 2023.

== Honours ==
=== Club ===
Vaduz

- Liechtenstein Cup: 2021–22

=== Individual ===
- Bündner Verbandssportpreis: 2015
