= Yannick Schmid =

Swiss football player (born 1995)

Personal information
- Date of birth: 11 May 1995 (age 31)
- Place of birth: Lucerne, Switzerland
- Height: 1.85 m (6 ft 1 in)
- Position: Centre-back

Team information
- Current team: Wil
- Number: 15

Youth career
- 2002–2012: Kriens
- 2012–2014: Luzern

Senior career*
Years	Team	Apps	(Gls)
2014–2019	Luzern	24	(2)
2014–2015	→ Zug 94 (loan)	11	(1)
2016–2017	→ Wohlen (loan)	20	(0)
2019–2022	Vaduz	102	(10)
2022–2024	Winterthur	35	(0)
2024–	Wil	63	(1)

International career
2016	Switzerland U20	1	(0)
- * Club domestic league appearances and goals as of 30 September 2026

Yannick Schmid (born 11 May 1995) is a Swiss professional footballer who plays as a centre-back for Wil in the Swiss Challenge League.

== Professional career ==
Schmid was loaned to FC Wohlen for the 2016–17 season. Schmid made his professional debut for FC Luzern in a 2–1 Swiss Super League win over Vaduz on 8 May 2016. He scored his first professional goal in 2–0 Swiss Super League win over St. Gallen on 9 August 2017.

On 2 September 2024, Schmid signed a two-year contract with Wil.

== International career ==
Schmid represented the Switzerland U20s in a friendly 1–1 draw with Germany U20s on 26 March 2016.
