= Silvan Sidler =

Swiss footballer (born 1998)

Personal information
- Full name: Silvan Eli Sidler
- Date of birth: 7 July 1998 (age 28)
- Place of birth: Affoltern am Albis, Switzerland
- Height: 1.85 m (6 ft 1 in)
- Position: Left-back

Team information
- Current team: Lecco
- Number: 24

Youth career
- 2012–2017: Luzern

Senior career*
Years	Team	Apps	(Gls)
2017–2022	Luzern	115	(4)
2022–2023	Arminia Bielefeld	9	(0)
2023–2026	Winterthur	90	(1)
2026–	Lecco	0	(0)

International career^{‡}
2018–2021	Switzerland U21	14	(1)
- * Club domestic league appearances and goals as of 22 August 2026 ‡ National team caps and goals as of 28 March 2021

Silvan Eli Sidler (born 7 July 1998) is a Swiss professional footballer who plays as a left-back for Serie C Group A club Lecco.

== Career ==
Sidler made his professional debut for Luzern in a 3–0 Swiss Super League win over St. Gallen on 5 November 2017.

In June 2022, 2. Bundesliga club Arminia Bielefeld announced the signing of Sidler until 2025.
