= Marvin Schulz =

German footballer (born 1995)

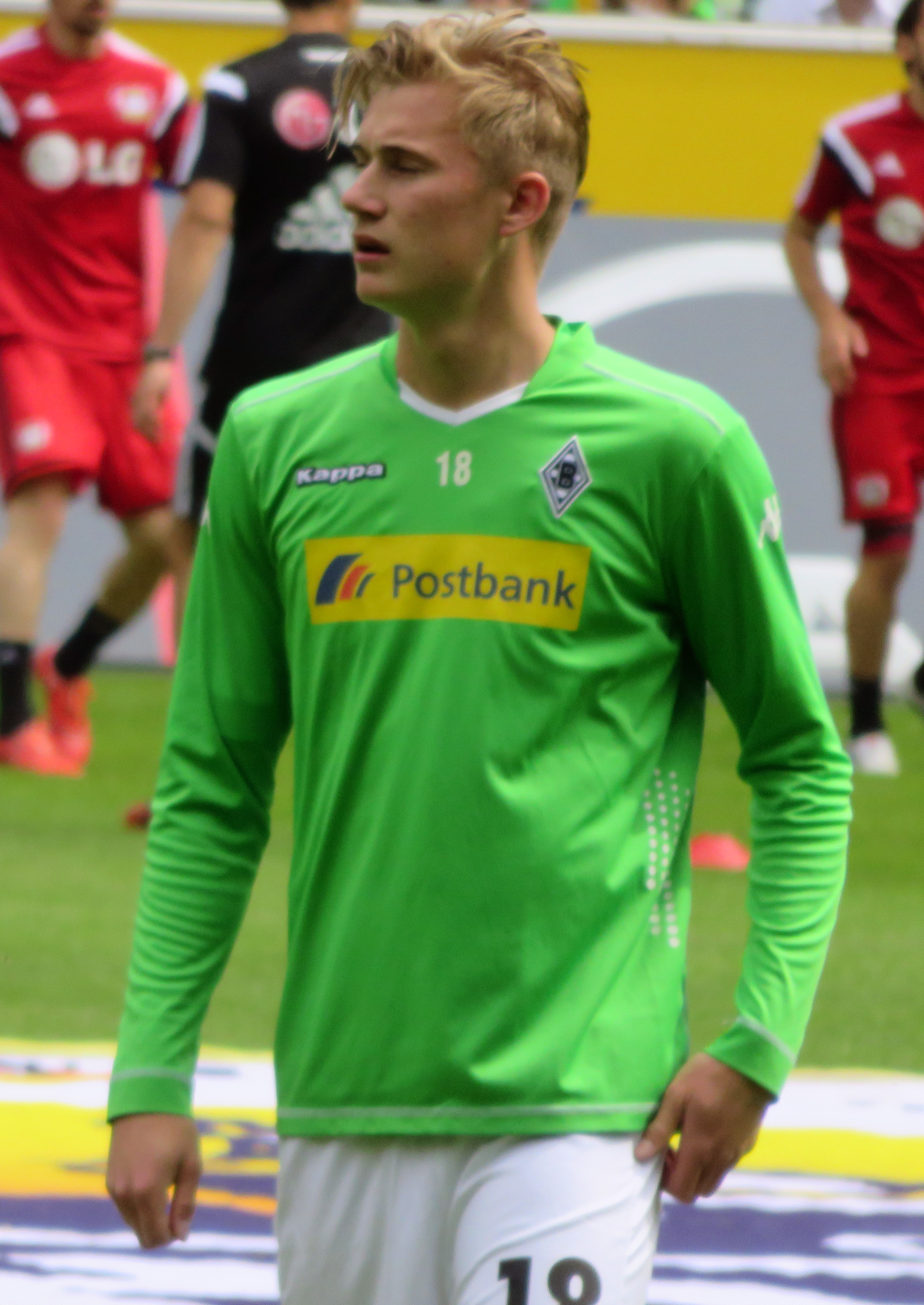
- Schulz with Borussia Mönchengladbach in 2015

Personal information
- Date of birth: 15 January 1995 (age 31)
- Place of birth: Mülheim, Germany
- Height: 1.86 m (6 ft 1 in)
- Position: Centre-back

Team information
- Current team: Preußen Münster
- Number: 10

Youth career
- –2003: Union 09 Mülheim
- 2003–2015: Borussia Mönchengladbach

Senior career*
Years	Team	Apps	(Gls)
2014–2017	Borussia Mönchengladbach II	27	(2)
2015–2017	Borussia Mönchengladbach	8	(0)
2017–2021	FC Luzern	139	(17)
2021–2025	Holstein Kiel	65	(1)
2025–	Preußen Münster	23	(1)

International career
2015–2016	Germany U20	7	(0)
- * Club domestic league appearances and goals as of 18 May 2026

Marvin Schulz (born 15 January 1995) is a German professional footballer who plays as a centre-back for 3. Liga club Preußen Münster.

== Club career ==
Schulz started with local team Union 09 Mülheim. He left in 2003, joining Borussia Mönchengladbach's reserve team. He signed a professional contract with Mönchengladbach in 2014 that would last until 2018. Schulz made his first team debut at 10 August 2015 in the DFB-Pokal against FC St. Pauli in a 4–1 away win. Five days later he made his Bundesliga debut in a 4–0 loss against Borussia Dortmund.

In July 2017, Schulz joined Swiss Super League side FC Luzern signing a three-year deal until 2020.

On 30 May 2022, it was announced that Schulz had signed for Holstein Kiel of the 2. Bundesliga on a three-year contract. With the start of the 2025/2026 season, he transferred to SC Preußen Münster, where he got injured on the 9^{th} game day and returned on field ten game days later.

== International career ==
Schulz was a youth international for Germany at the U20 level.

== Career statistics ==
As of match played 1 July 2025

Appearances and goals by club, season and competition
Club	Season	League			National cup		Continental		Other		Total	
Club	Season	Division	Apps	Goals	Apps	Goals	Apps	Goals	Apps	Goals	Apps	Goals
Borussia Mönchengladbach II	2014–15	Regionalliga West	16	2	—		—		—		16	2
Borussia Mönchengladbach II	2015–16	Regionalliga West	8	0	—		—		—		8	0
Borussia Mönchengladbach II	2016–17	Regionalliga West	3	0	—		—		—		3	0
Borussia Mönchengladbach II	Total		27	2	—		—		—		27	2
Borussia Mönchengladbach	2015–16	Bundesliga	8	0	1	0	2 (Note: Appearances in UEFA Champions League)	0	—		11	0
FC Luzern	2017–18	Swiss Super League	30	2	4	0	—		—		34	2
FC Luzern	2018–19	Swiss Super League	33	5	4	1	2 (Note: Appearances in UEFA Europa League)	0	—		39	6
FC Luzern	2019–20	Swiss Super League	24	0	3	0	3	0	—		30	0
FC Luzern	2020–21	Swiss Super League	22	7	1	1	—		—		23	8
FC Luzern	2021–22	Swiss Super League	30	3	4	0	2 (Note: Appearances in UEFA Conference League)	0	2	2	38	5
FC Luzern	Total		139	17	16	2	7	0	2	2	164	21
Holstein Kiel	2022–23	2. Bundesliga	26	0	1	0	—		—		27	0
Holstein Kiel	2023–24	2. Bundesliga	27	1	1	0	—		—		28	1
Holstein Kiel	2024–25	Bundesliga	12	0	1	0	—		—		13	0
Holstein Kiel	Total		65	1	3	0	—		—		68	1
Holstein Kiel II	2024–25	Regionalliga Nord	2	0	—		—		—		2	0
Career total			241	20	20	2	9	0	2	2	272	24
