= 2016–17 in Swiss football =

Football in Switzerland
- Season: 2016–17

Men's football
- Super League: Basel
- Challenge League: Zürich
- Promotion League: Rapperswil-Jona
- Swiss Cup: Basel

The following is a summary of the 2016–17 season of competitive football in Switzerland.

== Men's national team ==
The home team is on the left column; the away team is on the right column.

Win Draw Loss

=== 2018 FIFA World Cup qualification ===
Pos	Team	Pld	W	D	L	GF	GA	GD	Pts	Qualification
1	Portugal	10	9	0	1	32	4	+28	27	Qualification to 2018 FIFA World Cup
2	Switzerland	10	9	0	1	23	7	+16	27	Advance to second round
3	Hungary	10	4	1	5	14	14	0	13	
4	Faroe Islands	10	2	3	5	4	16	−12	9	
5	Latvia	10	2	1	7	7	18	−11	7	
6	Andorra	10	1	1	8	2	23	−21	4	

Source: FIFA
Rules for classification: Qualification tiebreakers

6 September 2016	Switzerland	2 – 0	Portugal	Basel, Switzerland
20:45 CEST	Embolo 24'; Mehmedi 31' (yellow card) 41'; Behrami (yellow card) 68'; Xhaka (yellow card) 90+3' (red card)	report	(yellow card) 30' Adrien Silva	Stadium: St. Jakob-Park; Attendance: 36'000; Referee: Antonio Mateu Lahoz (Spain)

7 October 2016	Hungary	2 – 3	Switzerland	Budapest, Hungary
20:45 CEST	Szalai 53', 71'	report	51' Seferovic; 67' Rodríguez; (yellow card) 80' Džemaili; 89' Stocker; (yellow card) 90+2' Behrami	Stadium: Groupama Arena; Attendance: 21'668; Referee: Björn Kuipers (Netherlands)

10 October 2016	Andorra	1 – 2	Switzerland	Andorra la Vella, Andorra
20:45 CEST	Lima (yellow card) 19'; Rubio (yellow card) 45+1'; Vales (yellow card) 50'; A. Martínez 90+1'	report	19' (pen.) (yellow card) 50' Schär; 77' Mehmedi; (yellow card) 90+3' Lang	Stadium: Estadi Nacional; Attendance: 2,014; Referee: John Beaton (Scotland)

13 November 2016	Switzerland	2 – 0	Faroe Islands	Lucerne, Switzerland
18:00 CET	Derdiyok 27'; Rodríguez (yellow card) 73'; Lichtsteiner 83'	report	(yellow card) 14' Olsen; (yellow card) 60' Næs; (yellow card) 60' Benjaminsen	Stadium: Swissporarena; Attendance: 14,800; Referee: Sébastien Delferière (Belgium)

25 March 2017	Switzerland	1 – 0	Latvia	Lancy, Switzerland
18:00 CET	Fernandes (yellow card) 48'; Schär (yellow card) 52'; Drmić 66'	Report	(yellow card) 28' Lazdiņš; (yellow card) 53' Freimanis	Stadium: Stade de Genève; Attendance: 25,000; Referee: Vladislav Bezborodov (Russia)

9 June 2017	Faroe Islands	0 – 2	Switzerland	Tórshavn, Faroe Islands
20:45 CET	Benjaminsen (yellow card) 41'; Rólantsson (yellow card) 90+1'	Report	36' Xhaka; 59' Shaqiri	Stadium: Tórsvøllur; Attendance: 4'594; Referee: Paolo Mazzoleni (Italy)

=== Friendly matches ===
1 June 2017	Switzerland	1 – 0	Belarus	Neuchâtel, Switzerland
20:45 CEST	Shaqiri 9'	Report		Stadium: Stade de la Maladière; Attendance: 10,200; Referee: Radek Příhoda (Czech Republic)

== Women's national team ==
The home team is on the left column; the away team is on the right column.

Win Draw Loss

=== UEFA Women's Euro 2017 qualifying ===
Pos	Team	Pld	W	D	L	GF	GA	GD	Pts	Qualification
1	Switzerland	8	8	0	0	34	3	+31	24	Final tournament
2	Italy	8	6	0	2	26	8	+18	18	Final tournament
3	Czech Republic	8	3	1	4	13	18	−5	10	
4	Northern Ireland	8	2	1	5	10	22	−12	7	
5	Georgia	8	0	0	8	2	34	−32	0	

Source: UEFA
Rules for classification: Qualification tiebreakers

15 September 2016	Georgia	0 – 3	Switzerland	Gori, Georgia
14:00 (CET)		Report	Crnogorčević 18' (pen.); Humm 34'; Dickenmann 90+4'	Stadium: Tengiz Burjanadze Stadium; Attendance: 350; Referee: Marta Huerta De Aza (Spain)

20 September 2016	Switzerland	4 – 0	Northern Ireland	Biel/Bienne, Switzerland
19:00 (CET)	Bernauer 17', 46'; Kiwic 42'; Rinast 54'	Report		Stadium: Tissot Arena; Attendance: 1,308; Referee: Tanja Subotič (Slovenia)

=== UEFA Women's Euro 2017 ===
Pos	Team	Pld	W	D	L	GF	GA	GD	Pts	Qualification
1	Austria	3	2	1	0	5	1	+4	7	Knockout stage
2	France	3	1	2	0	3	2	+1	5	Knockout stage
3	Switzerland	3	1	1	1	3	3	0	4	
4	Iceland	3	0	0	3	1	6	−5	0	

Source: UEFA
Rules for classification: Group stage tiebreakers

18 July 2017 Group Stage	Austria	1 – 0	Switzerland	Deventer, Netherlands
18:00 (CET)	Burger 15'	Report		Stadium: De Adelaarshorst; Attendance: 4,781; Referee: Bibiana Steinhaus (Germany)

22 July 2017 Group Stage	Iceland	1 – 2	Switzerland	Doetinchem, Netherlands
18:00 (CET)	Friðriksdóttir 33'	Report	43' Dickenmann; 52' Bachmann	Stadium: De Vijverberg; Attendance: 5,647; Referee: Anastasia Pustovoitova (Russia)

26 July 2017 Group Stage	Switzerland	1 – 1	France	Breda, Netherlands
20:45 (CET)	Crnogorčević 19'	Report	76' Abily	Stadium: Rat Verlegh Stadion; Attendance: 3,347; Referee: Katalin Kulcsár (Hungary)

=== 2017 Cyprus Cup ===
Team	Pld	W	D	L	GF	GA	GD	Pts
Switzerland	3	2	1	0	9	2	+7	7
North Korea	3	2	0	1	7	2	+5	6
Belgium	3	1	1	1	7	7	0	4
Italy	3	0	0	3	1	13	−12	0

1 March 2017 Group Stage	Belgium	2 – 2	Switzerland	Nicosia, Cyprus
17:30 (EET)	Mermans 30'; Cayman 77'	Report	26' Abbé; 87' Kuster	Stadium: Makario Stadium

3 March 2017 Group Stage	Switzerland	1 – 0	North Korea	Larnaca, Cyprus
14:30 (EET)	Kiwic 88'	Report		Stadium: Antonis Papadopoulos Stadium

6 March 2017 Group Stage	Italy	0 – 6	Switzerland	Larnaca, Cyprus
14:30 (EET)		Report	5' Humm; 21', 50' Reuteler; 32' Wälti; 83', 85' (pen.) Crnogorčević	Stadium: Antonis Papadopoulos Stadium

8 March 2017 Final	Switzerland	1 – 0	South Korea	Larnaca, Cyprus
18:30 (EET)	Dickenmann 57'	Report		Stadium: AEK Arena

=== Friendly matches ===
20 October 2016	United States	4 – 0	Switzerland	Sandy, UT, United States
03:00 (CET)	Williams 46'; Heath 61'; Press 69'; Mewis 76'	Report		Stadium: Rio Tinto Stadium; Attendance: 14,336; Referee: Melissa Borjas Pastrana (Honduras)

23 October 2016	United States	5 – 1	Switzerland	Minneapolis, MN, United States
19:00 (CET)	Lloyd 25', 51'; Press 53'; Dunn 63'; Ohai 82'	Report	7' Mauron	Stadium: U.S. Bank Stadium; Attendance: 23,400; Referee: Margaret Domka (United States)

10 April 2017	Norway	2 – 1	Switzerland	Skien, Norway
17:00 (CET)	Hegerberg 8'; Minde 62'	Report	61' Dickenmann	Stadium: Skagerak Arena

10 June 2017	Switzerland	0 – 4	England	Biel/Bienne, Switzerland
18:15 (CET)		Report	30' Nobbs; 40' Kirby; 50', 62' Taylor	Stadium: Tissot Arena; Referee: Marte Sørø (Norway)

== Domestic season ==
=== Super League ===
Pos	Team	Pld	W	D	L	GF	GA	GD	Pts	Qualification or relegation
1	Basel (C)	36	26	8	2	92	35	+57	86	Qualification for the Champions League group stage
2	Young Boys	36	20	9	7	72	44	+28	69	Qualification for the Champions League third qualifying round
3	Lugano	36	15	8	13	52	61	−9	53	Qualification for the Europa League group stage (Note: Since the winners of the 2016–17 Swiss Cup, Basel, qualified for European competition based on league position, the spot awarded to the Swiss Cup winners (Europa League group stage) was passed to the third-placed team, the spot awarded to the third-placed team was passed to the fourth-placed team, and the spot awarded to the fourth-placed team was passed to the fifth-placed team.)
4	Sion	36	15	6	15	60	55	+5	51	Qualification for the Europa League third qualifying round
5	Luzern	36	14	8	14	62	66	−4	50	Qualification for the Europa League second qualifying round
6	Thun	36	11	12	13	58	63	−5	45	
7	St. Gallen	36	11	8	17	43	57	−14	41	
8	Grasshopper	36	10	8	18	47	61	−14	38	
9	Lausanne-Sport	36	9	8	19	51	62	−11	35	
10	Vaduz (R)	36	7	9	20	45	78	−33	30	Qualification for the Europa League first qualifying round and relegation to Challenge League (Note: Vaduz qualified for the UEFA Europa League first qualifying round by winning the 2016–17 Liechtenstein Cup.)

Source: Swiss Super League, Soccerway
Rules for classification: 1) Points; 2) Goal difference; 3) Goals scored; 4) Head-to-head points; 5) Draw.
(C) Champions; (R) Relegated

=== Challenge League ===
Pos	Team	Pld	W	D	L	GF	GA	GD	Pts	Promotion or relegation
1	Zürich (C, P)	36	26	7	3	91	30	+61	85	Promotion to 2017–18 Swiss Super League
2	Neuchâtel Xamax	36	22	7	7	66	36	+30	73	
3	Servette	36	18	8	10	55	43	+12	62	
4	Schaffhausen	36	16	3	17	64	59	+5	51	
5	Aarau	36	13	6	17	57	64	−7	45	
6	Winterthur	36	11	8	17	45	62	−17	41	
7	Wohlen	36	12	3	21	42	60	−18	39	
8	Chiasso	36	9	10	17	43	63	−20	37	
9	Le Mont (Note: Le Mont will take voluntary relegation three steps down) (R)	36	8	11	17	31	54	−23	35	Relegation to 2017–18 2. Liga Interregional
10	Wil (Note: Wil were deducted three points for licence rules violation)	36	10	7	19	35	58	−23	34	

Source: RSSSF
Rules for classification: 1) points; 2) goal difference; 3) number of goals scored; 4) head-to-head points; 5) draw
(C) Champions; (P) Promoted; (R) Relegated

=== 1. Liga Promotion ===
Pos	Team	Pld	W	D	L	GF	GA	GD	Pts	Promotion, qualification or relegation
1	FC Rapperswil-Jona	30	18	8	4	60	29	+31	62	Swiss Promotion League Champion; Promotion to Challenge League
2	SC Kriens	30	17	6	7	65	31	+34	57	
3	FC Basel U-21	30	16	7	7	64	37	+27	55	
4	FC Stade Nyonnais	30	14	7	9	51	39	+12	49	
5	FC Zürich U-21	30	13	9	8	54	52	+2	48	
6	FC Breitenrain	30	13	6	11	46	49	−3	45	
7	SC Brühl	30	11	7	12	56	54	+2	40	
8	FC Köniz	30	11	7	12	40	43	−3	40	
9	FC La Chaux-de-Fonds	30	10	9	11	44	46	−2	39	
10	FC Sion U-21	30	11	6	13	48	58	−10	39	
11	SC Cham	30	9	10	11	47	46	+1	37	
12	BSC Old Boys Basel	30	9	7	14	47	48	−1	34	
13	SC Young Fellows Juventus	30	8	9	13	44	53	−9	33	
14	FC Bavois	30	8	7	15	37	69	−32	31	
15	FC United Zürich	30	8	3	19	32	61	−29	27	
16	FC Tuggen	30	6	8	16	37	57	−20	26	Relegation to 2017–18 1. Liga Classic

Source: RSSSF
Rules for classification: 1) points; 2) goal difference; 3) number of goals scored; 4) head-to-head points; 5) draw

=== Swiss Cup ===
Final

Basel had beaten Winterthur 3–1 in the first semi-final and Sion had beaten Luzern 6–5 in the penalty shoot-out of the second semi-final. The winners of the semi-finals played against each other in the final. The match was played on 25 May 2017 at the Stade de Genève.

25 May 2017
16:00
Final

Basel	3 – 0	Sion
Doumbia (yellow card) 44'; Delgado 47' (1:0); Traoré 62' (2:0); Lang (yellow card) 77'; Lang 89' (3:0); Xhaka (yellow card) 79'	ASF/SFV summary	(yellow card) 37' Salatic; (yellow card) 90+5' Lüchinger

Stade de Genève, Lancy
Attendance: 26,500
Referee: (Switzerland) Stephan Klossner

Teams

GK	(Czech Republic) Tomáš Vaclík
DF	(Switzerland) Michael Lang
DF	(Czech Republic) Marek Suchý
DF	(Switzerland) Manuel Akanji
DF	(Ivory Coast) Adama Traoré
MF	(Albania) Taulant Xhaka
MF	(Switzerland) Luca Zuffi	(substituted off) 90+3'
MF	(Norway) Mohamed Elyounoussi
MF	(Argentina) Matías Delgado (cap)	(substituted off) 81'
MF	(Switzerland) Renato Steffen
ST	(Ivory Coast) Seydou Doumbia	(substituted off) 88'
Substitutes:
MF	(Ivory Coast) Serey Die	(substituted on) 81'
ST	(Austria) Marc Janko	(substituted on) 88'
MF	(Sweden) Alexander Fransson	(substituted on) 90+3'
Manager:
(Switzerland) Urs Fischer

GK	(Russia) Anton Mitryushkin
DF	(Switzerland) Nicolas Lüchinger
DF	(Montenegro) Elsad Zverotić (cap)
DF	(Switzerland) Reto Ziegler
DF	(The Gambia) Pa Modou Jagne	(substituted off) 63'
MF	(Switzerland) Gregory Karlen	(substituted off) 70'
MF	(Switzerland) Vero Salatić
MF	(Guinea) Kévin Constant
ST	(Democratic Republic of the Congo) Chadrac Akolo	(substituted off) 79'
ST	(Senegal) Moussa Konaté
ST	(Angola) Joaquim Adão
Substitutes:
MF	(Portugal) Carlitos	(substituted on) 63'
MF	(Belgium) Geoffrey Mujangi Bia	(substituted on) 70'
MF	(Brazil) Léo Itaperuna	(substituted on) 79'
Manager:
(Switzerland) Sébastien Fournier

== Swiss Clubs in Europe ==
- Basel: Champions League group stage
- Young Boys: Champions League third qualifying round
- Luzern: Europa League third qualifying round
- Grasshopper Club: Europa League second qualifying round
- Vaduz: Europa League first qualifying round
- Zürich: Europa League group stage

=== Basel ===
==== Champions League group stage ====
Matches

13 September 2016 Round 1	Basel (Switzerland)	1 – 1	(Bulgaria) Ludogorets Razgrad	St. Jakob-Park, Basel
20:45	Steffen (yellow card) 65'; Steffen 80' (1:1)	UEFA report FCB summary	45' (0:1) Cafu; (yellow card) 67' Wanderson; (yellow card) 77' Natanael	Attendance: 30,852; Referee: (Belarus) Aleksei Kulbakov

28 September 2016 Round 2	Arsenal (England)	2 – 0	(Switzerland) Basel	Emirates Stadium, London
20:45	Walcott 7' (1:0); Walcott 26' (2:0)	UEFA report FCB summary	(yellow card) 21' Suchý; (yellow card) 85' Elyounoussi	Attendance: 59,993; Referee: Danny Makkelie (Netherlands)

19 October 2016 Round 3	Paris Saint-Germain (France)	3 – 0	(Switzerland) Basel	Parc des Princes, Paris
20:45	Di María 40' (1:0); Lucas 62' (2:0); Rabiot (yellow card) 64'; Cavani 90+3' (pen. 3:0)	UEFA report FCB summary	(yellow card) 66' Steffen; (yellow card) 76' Lang	Attendance: 46,488; Referee: Deniz Aytekin (Germany)

1 November 2016 Round 4	Basel (Switzerland)	1 – 2	(France) Paris Saint-Germain	St. Jakob-Park, Basel
20:45	Steffen (yellow card) 45+2'; Zuffi 76' (1:1); Serey Die (yellow card) 77' (yellow-red card) 85'	UEFA report FCB summary	43' (0:1) Matuidi; (yellow card) 86' Verratti; (yellow card) 88' Kurzawa; 90' (1:2) Meunier	Attendance: 34,639; Referee: Ovidiu Hațegan (Romania)

23 November 2016 Round 5	Ludogorets Razgrad (Bulgaria)	0 – 0	(Switzerland) Basel	Vasil Levski National Stadium, Sofia
20:45	Xhaka (yellow card) 63'; Suchý (yellow card) 81'; Traoré (yellow card) 87'	UEFA report FCB summary	(yellow card) 40' Anicet Abel; (yellow card) 91' Cicinho	Attendance: 20,821; Referee: Martin Atkinson (England)

6 December 2016 Round 6	Basel (Switzerland)	1 – 4	(England) Arsenal	St. Jakob-Park, Basel
20:45	Balanta (yellow card) 66'; Doumbia 78' (1:4)	UEFA report FCB summary	8' (0:1) Pérez; 16' (0:2) Pérez; 47' (0:3) Pérez; (yellow card) 36' Gibbs; 53' (0:4) Iwobi	Attendance: 36,000; Referee: Jorge Sousa (Portugal)

Final group table

Pos	Team	Pld	W	D	L	GF	GA	GD	Pts	Qualification	ARS	PAR	LUD	BSL
1	(England) Arsenal	6	4	2	0	18	6	+12	14	Advance to knockout phase	—	2–2	6–0	2–0
2	(France) Paris Saint-Germain	6	3	3	0	13	7	+6	12	Advance to knockout phase	1–1	—	2–2	3–0
3	(Bulgaria) Ludogorets Razgrad	6	0	3	3	6	15	−9	3	Transfer to Europa League	2–3	1–3	—	0–0
4	(Switzerland) Basel	6	0	2	4	3	12	−9	2		1–4	1–2	1–1	—

Source: UEFA

=== Young Boys ===
==== Champions League qualifying rounds ====
Third qualifying round

26 July 2016	Shakhtar Donetsk (Ukraine)	2–0	(Switzerland) Young Boys	Arena Lviv, Lviv
20:45	Bernard 27'; Seleznyov 75'	Report		Attendance: 7,477; Referee: Serdar Gözübüyük (Netherlands)

3 August 2016	Young Boys (Switzerland)	2–0 (a.e.t.) (4–2 p)	(Ukraine) Shakhtar Donetsk	Stade de Suisse, Bern
20:15	Kubo 54', 60'	Report		Attendance: 9,365< Referee: Ruddy Buquet (France)
	Penalties
	Hoarau (penalty scored); Kubo (penalty scored); Hadergjonaj (penalty missed); Rochat (penalty scored); Gajić (penalty scored)		(penalty scored) Srna; (penalty missed) Fred; (penalty missed) Rakitskiy; (penalty scored) Marlos

2–2 on aggregate; Young Boys won on penalties.

Play-off round

16 August 2016	Young Boys (Switzerland)	1–3	(Germany) Borussia Mönchengladbach	Stade de Suisse, Bern
20:45	Sulejmani 56'	Report	Raffael 11'; Hahn 67'; Rochat 69' (o.g.)	Attendance: 30,224; Referee: Nicola Rizzoli (Italy)

24 August 2016	Borussia Mönchengladbach (Germany)	6–1	(Switzerland) Young Boys	Borussia-Park, Mönchengladbach
20:45	Hazard 9', 64', 84'; Raffael 33', 40', 77'	Report	Ravet 79'	Attendance: 43,302; Referee: Andre Marriner (England)

Borussia Mönchengladbach won 9–2 on aggregate.

==== Europa League group stage ====
Matches

15 September 2016	Young Boys (Switzerland)	0–1	(Greece) Olympiacos	Stade de Suisse, Bern
19:00		Report	Cambiasso 42'	Attendance: 11,132; Referee: Serhiy Boyko (Ukraine)

29 September 2016	Astana (Kazakhstan)	0–0	(Switzerland) Young Boys	Astana Arena, Astana
17:00		Report		Attendance: 21,328; Referee: Simon Lee Evans (Wales)

20 October 2016	Young Boys (Switzerland)	3–1	(Cyprus) APOEL	Stade de Suisse, Bern
21:05	Hoarau 18', 52', 82' (pen.)	Report	Efrem 14'	Attendance: 9,553; Referee: Tobias Welz (Germany)

3 November 2016	APOEL (Cyprus)	1–0	(Switzerland) Young Boys	GSP Stadium, Nicosia
19:00	Sotiriou 69'	Report		Attendance: 12,761; Referee: Sébastien Delferière (Belgium)

24 November 2016	Olympiacos (Greece)	1–1	(Switzerland) Young Boys	Karaiskakis Stadium, Piraeus
21:05	Fortounis 48'	Report	Hoarau 58'	Attendance: 24,131; Referee: Miroslav Zelinka (Czech Republic)

8 December 2016	Young Boys (Switzerland)	3–0	(Kazakhstan) Astana	Stade de Suisse, Bern
19:00	Frey 63'; Hoarau 66'; Schick 71'	Report		Attendance: 7,616; Referee: Clayton Pisani (Malta)

Final group table

Pos	Team	Pld	W	D	L	GF	GA	GD	Pts	Qualification	APO	OLY	YB	AST
1	(Cyprus) APOEL	6	4	0	2	8	6	+2	12	Advance to knockout phase	—	2–0	1–0	2–1
2	(Greece) Olympiacos	6	2	2	2	7	6	+1	8	Advance to knockout phase	0–1	—	1–1	4–1
3	(Switzerland) Young Boys	6	2	2	2	7	4	+3	8		3–1	0–1	—	3–0
4	(Kazakhstan) Astana	6	1	2	3	5	11	−6	5		2–1	1–1	0–0	—

Source: UEFA

=== Luzern ===
==== Europa League qualifying ====
Third qualifying round

28 July 2016	Luzern (Switzerland)	1–1	(Italy) Sassuolo	Swissporarena, Lucerne
19:45	M. Schneuwly 8'	Report	Berardi 42' (pen.)	Attendance: 10,555; Referee: Andreas Ekberg (Sweden)

4 August 2016	Sassuolo (Italy)	3–0	(Switzerland) Luzern	Mapei Stadium – Città del Tricolore, Reggio Emilia
20:30	Berardi 19', 39' (pen.); Defrel 64'	Report		Attendance: 13,415; Referee: Ali Palabıyık (Turkey)

Sassuolo won 4–1 on aggregate.

=== Grasshopper Club ===
==== Europa League qualifying ====
Second qualifying round

14 July 2016	KR (Iceland)	3–3	(Switzerland) Grasshopper	KR-völlur, Reykjavík
21:15	Andersen 46', 50'; Hauksson 77' (pen.)	Report	Munsy 18'; Gjorgjev 36'; Caio 59'	Attendance: 767; Referee: Peter Kjærsgaard-Andersen (Denmark)

21 July 2016	Grasshopper (Switzerland)	2–1	(Iceland) KR	Letzigrund, Zürich
19:00	Sigurjónsson 45', 68'	Report	Andersen 52'	Attendance: 3,940; Referee: Erez Papir (Israel)

Grasshopper won 5–4 on aggregate.

Third qualifying round

28 July 2016	Grasshopper (Switzerland)	2–1	(Cyprus) Apollon Limassol	kybunpark, St. Gallen (Note: Grasshopper played their third qualifying round home match at kybunpark, St. Gallen, instead of their regular stadium Letzigrund, Zürich, which is booked for a Bruce Springsteen concert.)
19:45	Tabaković 11'; Lavanchy 90+3'	Report	Guié Guié 76'	Attendance: 2,330; Referee: Andris Treimanis (Latvia)

4 August 2016	Apollon Limassol (Cyprus)	3–3 (a.e.t.)	(Switzerland) Grasshopper	GSP Stadium, Nicosia
19:00	Paulo Vinícius 73'; Papoulis 87'; Guié Guié 101'	Report	Andersen 77'; Caio 103'; Gjorgjev 120+1'	Attendance: 5,887; Referee: Andre Marriner (England)

Grasshopper won 5–4 on aggregate.

Play-off round

18 August 2016	Fenerbahçe (Turkey)	3–0	(Switzerland) Grasshopper	Şükrü Saracoğlu Stadium, Istanbul
20:00	Chahechouhe 4'; Stoch 72', 90+1'	Report		Attendance: 16,280; Referee: Robert Schörgenhofer (Austria)

25 August 2016	Grasshopper (Switzerland)	0–2	(Turkey) Fenerbahçe	Letzigrund, Zürich
19:00		Report	Fernandão 77'; Stoch 84'	Attendance: 14,400; Referee: Danny Makkelie (Netherlands)

Fenerbahçe won 5–0 on aggregate.

=== Vaduz ===
==== Europa League qualifying ====
First qualifying round

30 June 2016	Vaduz (Liechtenstein)	3–1	(North Macedonia) Sileks	Rheinpark Stadion, Vaduz
19:00	Costanzo 36', 45+2'; Grippo 90+5'	Report	Mickov 86'	Attendance: 928; Referee: Þóroddur Hjaltalín Jr. (Iceland)

7 July 2016	Sileks (North Macedonia)	1–2	(Liechtenstein) Vaduz	Philip II Arena, Skopje (Note: Sileks played their home match at Philip II Arena, Skopje, instead of their regular stadium City Stadium, Kratovo.)
20:00	Mickov 30'	Report	Costanzo 89' (pen.); Messaoud 90+3'	Attendance: 450; Referee: Paul McLaughlin (Republic of Ireland)

Vaduz won 5–2 on aggregate.

second qualifying round

14 July 2016	Midtjylland (Denmark)	3–0	(Liechtenstein) Vaduz	MCH Arena, Herning
18:30	Sisto 20', 82'; Onuachu 73'	Report		Attendance: 4,455; Referee: Kirill Levnikov (Russia)

21 July 2016	Vaduz (Liechtenstein)	2–2	(Denmark) Midtjylland	Rheinpark Stadion, Vaduz
19:00	Brunner 83'; Costanzo 86' (pen.)	Report	Sisto 41', 68'	Attendance: 842; Referee: Andrew Davey (Northern Ireland)

Midtjylland won 5–2 on aggregate.

=== Zürich ===
==== Europa League group stage ====
Matches

15 September 2016	Villarreal (Spain)	2–1	(Switzerland) Zürich	El Madrigal, Villarreal
21:05	Pato 28'; Jonathan 45+1'	Report	Sadiku 2'	Attendance: 16,384; Referee: Sébastien Delferière (Belgium)

29 September 2016	Zürich (Switzerland)	2–1	(Turkey) Osmanlıspor	Letzigrund, Zürich
19:00	Schönbächler 45+1'; Čavušević 79'	Report	Maher 73'	Attendance: 7,473; Referee: Aleksei Eskov (Russia)

20 October 2016	Steaua București (Romania)	1–1	(Switzerland) Zürich	Arena Națională, Bucharest
19:00	Golubović 63'	Report	Koné 86'	Attendance: 13,154; Referee: Tamás Bognár (Hungary)

3 November 2016	Zürich (Switzerland)	0–0	(Romania) Steaua București	Letzigrund, Zürich
21:05		Report		Attendance: 8,060; Referee: Robert Schörgenhofer (Austria)

24 November 2016	Zürich (Switzerland)	1–1	(Spain) Villarreal	Letzigrund, Zürich
19:00	Rodríguez 87' (pen.)	Report	Soriano 14'	Attendance: 10,069; Referee: Davide Massa (Italy)

8 December 2016	Osmanlıspor (Turkey)	2–0	(Switzerland) Zürich	Osmanlı Stadyumu, Ankara
17:00	Delarge 73'; Kılıçaslan 89'	Report		Attendance: 10,250; Referee: Matej Jug (Slovenia)

==== Final group table ====
Pos	Team	Pld	W	D	L	GF	GA	GD	Pts	Qualification
1	(Turkey) Osmanlıspor	6	3	1	2	10	7	+3	10	Advance to knockout phase
2	(Spain) Villarreal	6	2	3	1	9	8	+1	9	Advance to knockout phase
3	(Switzerland) Zürich	6	1	3	2	5	7	−2	6	
4	(Romania) Steaua București	6	1	3	2	5	7	−2	6	

Source: UEFA
Rules for classification: Group stage tiebreakers

== Notes ==
Preceded by 2015–16	Seasons in Swiss football	Succeeded by 2017–18
