= 2015–16 in Swiss football =

Football in Switzerland
- Season: 2015–16

Men's football
- Super League: Basel
- Challenge League: Lausanne
- Promotion League: Servette
- Swiss Cup: Zürich

The following is a summary of the 2015–16 season of competitive football in Switzerland.

== Men's national team ==
The home team is on the left column; the away team is on the right column.

Win Draw Loss

=== UEFA Euro 2016 ===
11 June 2016	Albania	0 – 1	Switzerland	Lens, France
15:00 CEST	Cana (yellow card) 23' (yellow-red card); Kaçe (yellow card) 63'; Kukeli (yellow card) 89'; Mavraj (yellow card) 90+2'	Summary	Schär 5' (yellow card) 13'; Behrami (yellow card) 67'	Stadium: Stade Bollaert-Delelis; Attendance: 33,805; Referee: (Spain) Carlos Velasco Carballo

15 June 2016	Romania	1 – 1	Switzerland	Paris, France
18:00 CEST	Stancu 18' (pen.); Prepeliță (yellow card) 22'; Chipciu (yellow card) 23'; Keșerü (yellow card) 37'; Grigore (yellow card) 76'	Summary	Xhaka (yellow card) 50'; Mehmedi 57'; Embolo (yellow card) 90+4'	Stadium: Parc des Princes; Attendance: 43,576; Referee: (Russia) Sergei Karasev

19 June 2016	Switzerland	0 – 0	France	Villeneuve-d'Ascq, France
21:00 CEST		Summary	Rami (yellow card) 25'; Koscielny (yellow card) 83'	Stadium: Stade Pierre-Mauroy; Attendance: 45,616; Referee: (Slovenia) Damir Skomina

25 June 2016 Last 16	Switzerland	1 – 1 (a.e.t.) (4 – 5 p)	Poland	Saint-Étienne, France
15:00 CEST	Shaqiri 82'	Report	Błaszczykowski 39'	Stadium: Stade Geoffroy-Guichard; Attendance: 38,842; Referee: (England) Mark Clattenburg
	Penalties
	Lichsteiner (penalty scored); Xhaka (penalty missed); Shaqiri (penalty scored); Schär (penalty scored); Rodríguez (penalty scored)		(penalty scored) Lewandowski; (penalty scored) Milik; (penalty scored) Glik; (penalty scored) Błaszczykowski; (penalty scored) Krychowiak

=== UEFA Euro 2016 qualification ===
5 September 2015	Switzerland	3 – 2	Slovenia	Basel, Switzerland
20:45 CEST	Drmić 82', 90+5'; Stocker 84'	report	45' Novaković; 49' Cesar	Stadium: St. Jakob-Park; Attendance: 25'000; Referee: Pavel Královec (Czech Republic)

8 September 2015	England	2 – 0	Switzerland	London, England
20:45 CEST	Kane 67'; Rooney 84' (pen.)	report		Stadium: Wembley Stadium; Attendance: 75'751; Referee: Gianluca Rocchi (Italy)

9 October 2015	Switzerland	7 – 0	San Marino	St. Gallen, Switzerland
20:45 CEST	Lang 16'; Inler 56' (pen.); Mehmedi 66'; Djourou 72' (pen.); Kasami 75'; Embolo 80'; Derdiyok 89'	report		Stadium: AFG Arena; Attendance: 16'200; Referee: Mattias Gestranius (Finland)

12 October 2015	Estonia	0 – 1	Switzerland	Tallinn, Estonia
20:45 CEST		report	90+4' (o.g.) Klavan	Stadium: A. Le Coq Arena; Attendance: 8'000; Referee: Pol van Boekel (Netherlands)

=== Friendly matches ===
13 November 2015	Slovakia	3 – 2	Switzerland	Trnava, Slovakia
20:45 CET	Ďuriš 39', 48'; Mak 55'	report	63' Derdiyok; 67' Drmić	Stadium: Štadión Antona Malatinského; Attendance: 17'582; Referee: Miroslav Zelinka (Czech Republic)

17 November 2015	Austria	1 – 2	Switzerland	Vienna, Austria
20:45 CET	Alaba 14'	report	10', 39' Seferovic	Stadium: Ernst-Happel-Stadion; Attendance: 27'600; Referee: Manuel Gräfe (Germany)

25 March 2016	Republic of Ireland	1 – 0	Switzerland	Dublin, Ireland
20:45 CET	Clark 2'	report		Stadium: Aviva Stadium; Attendance: 42,000; Referee: Miroslav Zelinka (Czech Republic)

29 March 2016	Switzerland	0 – 2	Bosnia and Herzegovina	Zürich, Switzerland
20:30 CET		report	14' Džeko; 57' Pjanić	Stadium: Letzigrund; Attendance: 17,000; Referee: Sébastien Delferière (Belgium)

28 May 2016	Switzerland	1 – 2	Belgium	Lancy, Switzerland
16:15 CET	Džemaili 32'; Seferovic (red card) 81'	report	34' Lukaku; 83' De Bruyne	Stadium: Stade de Genève; Attendance: 20,000; Referee: Paolo Mazzoleni (Italy)

11 June 2016	Switzerland	2 – 1	Moldova	Lugano, Switzerland
18:00 CET	Namașco 12' (o.g.); Mehmedi 75'	report	70' Gînsari	Stadium: Stadio Cornaredo; Attendance: 5,700; Referee: Alejandro Hernández Hernández (Spain)

== Women's national team ==
The home team is on the left column; the away team is on the right column.

Win Draw Loss

=== UEFA Women's Euro 2017 qualifying ===
24 October 2015	Italy	0 – 3	Switzerland	Cesena, Italy
15:00 (CET)		report	59', 62' Bachmann; 87' Crnogorčević	Stadium: Stadio Dino Manuzzi; Attendance: 2'500; Referee: Pernilla Larsson (Sweden)

27 October 2015	Switzerland	4 – 0	Georgia	Biel/Bienne, Switzerland
18:30 (CET)	Skhirtladze 9' (o.g.); Crnogorčević 34'; Dickenmann 50'; Humm 74'	report		Stadium: Tissot Arena; Attendance: 2'252; Referee: Sofia Karagiori (Cyprus)

27 November 2015	Northern Ireland	1 – 8	Switzerland	Lurgan, Northern Ireland
20:00 (CET)	Furness 37'	report	14', 35' Humm; 28' Kiwic; 33' Moser; 36' Ismaili; 59' Crnogorčević; 74' Deplazes; 85' Dickenmann	Stadium: Mourneview Park; Attendance: 250; Referee: Zuzana Kováčová (Slovakia)

1 December 2015	Switzerland	5 – 1	Czech Republic	Neuchâtel, Switzerland
19:00 (CET)	Bürki 23'; Humm 28'; Bachmann 33'; Crnogorčević 42'; Terchoun 84'	report	Svitková 73'	Stadium: Stade de la Maladière; Attendance: 2'008; Referee: Kateryna Zora (Ukraine)

9 April 2016	Switzerland	2 – 1	Italy	Biel/Bienne, Switzerland
17:30	Bachmann 7'; Terchoun 36'	Report	Parisi 65'	Stadium: Tissot Arena; Attendance: 2,208; Referee: Morag Pirie (Scotland)

4 June 2016	Czech Republic	5 – 0	Switzerland	Jablonec nad Nisou, Czech Republic
17:00		Report	Humm 4'; Moser 35', 90+3'; Crnogorčević 40', 66' (pen.)	Stadium: Stadion Střelnice; Attendance: 632; Referee: Monika Mularczyk (Poland)

=== 2016 UEFA Women's Olympic qualifying tournament ===
2 March 2016	Switzerland	3 – 4	Netherlands	The Hague, Netherlands
	Humm 4'; Kiwic 74'; Bachmann 83'	Report	Melis 29' (pen.); Miedema 56'; Van den Berg 61'; Van de Sanden 63'	Stadium: Kyocera Stadion; Attendance: 6,658; Referee: Kateryna Monzul (Ukraine)

5 March 2016	Sweden	1–0	Switzerland	Rotterdam, Netherlands
	Seger 44'	Report		Stadium: Stadion Woudestein; Referee: Katalin Kulcsár (Hungary)

9 March 2016	Switzerland	2–1	Norway	Rotterdam, Netherlands
19:30	Mauron 32'; Kiwic 90+3'	Report	C. Hansen 10'	Stadium: Stadion Woudestein; Referee: Teodora Albon (Romania)

=== Friendly matches ===
22 September 2015	Switzerland	4 – 1	Denmark	Biel/Bienne, Switzerland
18:30 (CET)	Crnogorčević 7', 82'; Sørensen 12' (o.g.); Bachmann 34'	report	50' Larsen	Stadium: Tissot Arena; Attendance: 687

== Domestic season ==
=== Super League ===
Pos	Team	Pld	W	D	L	GF	GA	GD	Pts	Qualification or relegation
1	Basel (C)	36	26	5	5	88	38	+50	83	Qualification for the Champions League group stage
2	Young Boys	36	20	9	7	78	47	+31	69	Qualification for the Champions League third qualifying round
3	Luzern	36	15	9	12	59	50	+9	54	Qualification for the Europa League third qualifying round
4	Grasshopper	36	15	8	13	65	56	+9	53	Qualification for the Europa League second qualifying round
5	Sion	36	14	8	14	52	49	+3	50	
6	Thun	36	10	11	15	45	54	−9	41	
7	St. Gallen	36	10	8	18	41	66	−25	38	
8	Vaduz	36	7	15	14	44	60	−16	36	Qualification for the Europa League first qualifying round (Note: Vaduz qualified for the UEFA Europa League first qualifying round by winning the 2015–16 Liechtenstein Cup.)
9	Lugano	36	9	8	19	46	75	−29	35	
10	Zürich (R)	36	7	13	16	48	71	−23	34	Qualification for the Europa League group stage and relegation to Challenge League (Note: Zürich qualified for the UEFA Europa League group stage by winning the 2015–16 Swiss Cup.)

Source: Swiss Super League, Soccerway
Rules for classification: 1) Points; 2) Goal difference; 3) Goals scored; 4) Head-to-head points 5) Draw.
(C) Champions; (R) Relegated

=== Challenge League ===
Pos	Team	Pld	W	D	L	GF	GA	GD	Pts	Promotion or relegation
1	Lausanne-Sport (C, P)	34	19	8	7	61	39	+22	65	Promotion to 2016–17 Swiss Super League
2	Neuchâtel Xamax	34	15	9	10	53	42	+11	54	
3	Wil	34	14	11	9	60	49	+11	53	
4	Aarau	34	12	14	8	44	39	+5	50	
5	Schaffhausen	34	14	5	15	43	45	−2	47	
6	Winterthur	34	12	7	15	40	49	−9	43	
7	Chiasso	34	7	16	11	39	44	−5	37	
8	Wohlen	34	9	9	16	35	52	−17	36	
9	Le Mont	34	7	11	16	36	50	−14	32	
10	Biel-Bienne (Note: FC Biel-Bienne were deducted one point for licence violation. On 22 April Biel-Bienne were deducted four more points. On 27 April licence committee of the Swiss Football League stripped Biel-Bienne of their league licence. Results of Biel-Bienne's second half of the season were converted to 0-0 draws that award no points.) (R)	34	5	22	7	28	30	−2	16	Relegation to 2016–17 1. Liga Promotion

Source: RSSSF
Rules for classification: 1) points; 2) goal difference; 3) number of goals scored; 4) head-to-head points; 5) draw
(C) Champions; (P) Promoted; (R) Relegated

=== Promotion League ===
Pos	Team	Pld	W	D	L	GF	GA	GD	Pts	Promotion, qualification or relegation
1	Servette FC (C, P)	30	20	6	4	61	26	+35	66	Promotion to Challenge League
2	SC Cham	30	16	8	6	72	48	+24	56	
3	SC Kriens	30	17	3	10	47	36	+11	54	
4	FC Basel II	30	15	5	10	65	52	+13	50	
5	BSC Old Boys Basel	30	15	4	11	60	49	+11	49	
6	FC Rapperswil-Jona	30	12	10	8	41	33	+8	46	
7	Stade Nyonnais	30	11	6	13	46	45	+1	39	
8	FC Breitenrain	30	9	12	9	48	49	−1	39	
9	SC Brühl	30	10	8	12	52	52	0	38	
10	SC Young Fellows Juventus	30	9	9	12	47	55	−8	36	
11	FC Zürich II	30	10	5	15	57	65	−8	35	
12	FC Tuggen	30	9	8	13	42	59	−17	35	
13	FC Köniz	30	8	10	12	49	52	−3	34	
14	FC Sion II	30	8	7	15	27	47	−20	31	
15	FC St. Gallen II (R)	30	8	6	16	40	51	−11	30	Relegation to 1. Liga Classic
16	Étoile Carouge (R)	30	6	7	17	33	68	−35	25	Relegation to 1. Liga Classic

Source: RSSSF
Rules for classification: 1) Points;
(C) Champions; (P) Promoted; (R) Relegated

=== Swiss Cup Final ===
Lugano beat Luzern 2–1 in the first semi-final and Zürich beat Sion 3–0 in the other final. The winners of the semi-finals played against each other in the final. The match was played on 29 May 2016 the Letzigrund in Zürich.Fussball-Schweiz

29 May 2016
16:15

FC Lugano	0–1	FC Zürich
	SFV summary	40' Sarr

Letzigrund, Zürich
Attendance: 21,500
Referee: Alain Bieri

== Swiss Clubs in Europe ==
- Basel: Champions League third qualifying round
- Young Boys: Champions League third qualifying round
- Zürich: Europa League third qualifying round
- Thun: Europa League second qualifying round
- Sion: Europa League group stage
- Vaduz: Europa League first qualifying round

=== Basel ===
==== Champions League ====
Third qualifying round

29 July 2015 First leg	Lech Poznań (Poland)	1 – 3	(Switzerland) Basel	INEA Stadion, Poznań
20:45	Thomalla 36'; Thomalla (yellow card) 49'; Kędziora (red card) 66'; Linetty (yellow card) 69'; Kádár (yellow card) 82'	FCB summary UEFA summary	34' Lang; 77' Janko; 90+2' Callà; (red card) 90+3' T. Xhaka	Attendance: 28,000; Referee: Anthony Taylor (England)

5 August 2015 Second leg	Basel (Switzerland)	1 – 0 (4 – 1 agg.)	(Poland) Lech Poznań	St. Jakob-Park, Basel
20:15	Suchý (yellow card) 44'; Lang (yellow card) 55'; Callà (yellow card) 80'; Bjarnason 90+1'	FCB summary UEFA summary	(yellow card) 44' Linetty; (yellow card) 56' Kamiński; (yellow card) 86' Douglas	Attendance: 18,196; Referee: (France) Ruddy Buquet

Basel won 4-1 on aggregate.

Play-off round

19 August 2015 First leg	Basel (Switzerland)	2 – 2	(Israel) Maccabi Tel Aviv	St. Jakob-Park, Basel
20:45 CET	Elneny (yellow card) 19'; Delgado 39' (pen.); Suchý (yellow card) 60'; Embolo 88' (2:1)	FCB summary UEFA summary	31' (0:1) Zahavi; (yellow card) 70' Igiebor; (yellow card) 77' Alberman; 90+6' (2:2) Zahavi	Attendance: 15,620; Referee: Willie Collum (Scotland)

25 August 2015 Second leg	Maccabi Tel Aviv (Israel)	1 – 1 (a 3 – 3 agg.)	(Switzerland) Basel	Bloomfield Stadium, Tel Aviv
20:45 CET	Zahavi 24'; Rikan (yellow card) 62'	FCB summary UEFA summary	11' Zuffi; (yellow card) 49' Safari; (yellow card) 74' Zuffi; (yellow card) 84' T. Xhaka; (yellow card) 85' Suchý	Attendance: 13,350; Referee: Damir Skomina (Slovenia)

Maccabi Tel Aviv won on away goals rule.

==== Europa League ====
Group stage

17 September 2015 Round 1	Fiorentina (Italy)	1 – 2	(Switzerland) Basel	Stadio Artemio Franchi, Florence
21:05	Kalinić 4' (1:0); Roncaglia (yellow card) 35'; Rodríguez (red card) 65'	FCB summary UEFA summary	(yellow card) 34' Xhaka; (yellow card) 56' Suchý; 71' (1:1) Bjarnason; 79' (1:2) Elneny; (yellow card) 83' Janko	Attendance: 15,212; Referee: (England) Michael Oliver

1 October 2015 Round 2	Basel (Switzerland)	2 – 0	(Poland) Lech Poznań	St. Jakob-Park, Basel
19:00	Samuel (yellow card) 41'; Bjarnason 55' (1:0); Embolo 90' (2:0)	FCB summary UEFA summary	(yellow card) 42' (red card) 59' Linetty	Attendance: 17,567; Referee: (Bosnia and Herzegovina) Ognjen Valjić

22 October 2015 Round 3	Basel (Switzerland)	1 – 2	(Portugal) Belenenses	St. Jakob-Park, Basel
19:00	Lang 15' (1:0); Suchý (yellow card) 73'	FCB summary UEFA summary	27' (1:1) Leal; (yellow card) 34' Ferreira; 45+1' (1:2) Kuca; (yellow card) 87' Leal	Attendance: 17,275; Referee: Simon Lee Evans (Wales)

5 November 2015 Round 4	Belenenses (Portugal)	0 – 2	(Switzerland) Basel	Estádio do Restelo, Lisbon
21:05	Silva (yellow card) 65'; Pinto (yellow card) 66'; Caeiro (yellow card) 70'	FCB summary UEFA summary	45+1' (pen. 0:1) Janko; (yellow card) 60' Elneny; 64' (0:2) Embolo; (yellow card) 66' Janko; (yellow card) 89' Lang	Attendance: 4,802; Referee: Tamás Bognár (Hungary)

26 November 2015 Round 5	Basel (Switzerland)	2 – 2	(Italy) Fiorentina	St. Jakob-Park, Basel
19:00	Safari (yellow card) 26'; Bjarnason (yellow card) 29'; Suchý 40' (1:2); Janko (yellow card) 45+1'; Suchý (yellow card) 65'; Elneny 74' (2:2); Zuffi (yellow card) 78'	FCB summary UEFA summary	23' (0:1) Bernardeschi; 36' (0:2) Bernardeschi; (red card) 26' Roncaglia; (yellow card) 45+1' Rodríguez; (yellow card) 45+3' Badelj; (yellow card) 75' Valero	Attendance: 22,550; Referee: (Slovenia) Ivan Kružliak (Slovakia)

10 December 2015 Round 6	Lech Poznań (Poland)	0 – 1	(Switzerland) Basel	INEA Stadion, Poznań
21:05		FCB summary UEFA summary	50' (0:1) Boëtius	Attendance: 10,457; Referee: Bobby Madden (Scotland)
Note: Fair game, no yellow cards

Final group table

Pos	Team	Pld	W	D	L	GF	GA	GD	Pts	Qualification
1	(Switzerland) Basel	6	4	1	1	10	5	+5	13	Advance to knockout phase
2	(Italy) Fiorentina	6	3	1	2	11	6	+5	10	Advance to knockout phase
3	(Poland) Lech Poznań	6	1	2	3	2	6	−4	5	
4	(Portugal) Belenenses	6	1	2	3	2	8	−6	5	

Source: Soccerway
Rules for classification: Group stage tiebreakers

Knockout phase

Round of 32

18 February 2016 First Leg	Saint-Étienne (France)	3 – 2	(Switzerland) Basel	Saint-Étienne, France
19:00	Sall 9' (1:0); Monnet-Paquet 39' (2:0); Tannane (yellow card) 60'; Pajot (yellow card) 72'; Bahebeck 77' (3:2)	FCB summary UEFA summary	(yellow card) 25' Steffen; 44' (2:1) Samuel; 56' (pen. 2:2) Janko; (yellow card) 60' Xhaka; (yellow card) 74' Samuel; (yellow card) 88' Janko	Stadium: Stade Geoffroy-Guichard; Attendance: 27,013; Referee: Tasos Sidiropoulos (Greece)

25 February 2016 Second leg	Basel (Switzerland)	2 – 1	(France) Saint-Étienne	St. Jakob-Park, Basel
21:05	Zuffi 15' (1:0); Embolo (yellow card) 55' (yellow-red card) 84'; Zuffi 90+2' (2:1)	FCB summary UEFA summary	(yellow card) 31' Tannane; (yellow card) 63' Pogba; (yellow card) 82' (yellow-red card) 82' Eysseric; 90' Sall	Attendance: 20,976; Referee: Danny Makkelie (Netherlands)

4-4 on aggregate. Basel won on away goals.

Round of 16

10 March 2016 First leg	Basel (Switzerland)	0 – 0	(Spain) Sevilla	St. Jakob-Park, Basel
19:00	Samuel (yellow card) 8'; Steffen (yellow card) 90'	FCB summary UEFA summary	(yellow card) 37' Banega; (yellow card) 41' Cristóforo; (yellow card) 85' Trémoulinas; (yellow card) 75' (yellow-red card) 87' Nzonzi	Attendance: 22,403; Referee: Anthony Taylor (England)

17 March 2016 Second leg	Sevilla (Spain)	3 – 0	(Switzerland) Basel	Ramón Sánchez Pizjuán, Seville
21:05	Kolodziejczak (yellow card) 7'; Rami 35' (1:0); Gameiro 44' (2:0); Gameiro 45' (3:0)	FCB summary UEFA summary	(yellow card) 39' Steffen; (yellow card) 90+4' Embolo	Attendance: 35,546; Referee: Deniz Aytekin (Germany)

Sevilla won 3-0 on aggregate.

=== Young Boys ===
==== Champions League ====
Third qualifying round

28 July 2015 First leg	Young Boys (Switzerland)	1–3	(France) Monaco	Stade de Suisse, Bern
20:15	Nuzzolo 74'	Report	Kurzawa 64'; Carrillo 72'; Pašalić 75'	Attendance: 16,079; Referee: Matej Jug (Slovenia)

4 August 2015 Second leg	Monaco (France)	4–0	(Switzerland) Young Boys	Stade Louis II, Monaco
20:45	Cavaleiro 54'; Kurzawa 64'; Martial 70'; El Shaarawy 77'	Report		Attendance: 10,457; Referee: Danny Makkelie (Netherlands)

Monaco won 7–1 on aggregate.

==== Europa League ====
Play-off round

20 August 2015 First leg	Young Boys (Switzerland)	0–1	(Azerbaijan) Qarabağ	Stade de Suisse, Bern
20:00		Report	Almeida 67'	Attendance: 6,700; Referee: Vladislav Bezborodov (Russia)

27 August 2015 Second leg	Qarabağ (Azerbaijan)	3–0	(Switzerland) Young Boys	Tofiq Bahramov Republican Stadium, Baku
18:00	Almeida 4' (pen.); Reynaldo 43'; Ismayilov 61'	Report		Attendance: 29,620; Referee: Gediminas Mažeika (Lithuania)

Qarabağ won 4–0 on aggregate.

=== Zürich ===
==== Europa League ====
Third qualifying round

30 July 2015 First leg	Zürich (Switzerland)	0–1	(Belarus) Dinamo Minsk	Letzigrund, Zürich
19:30		Report	Bećiraj 63' (pen.)	Attendance: 3,587; Referee: Tom Harald Hagen (Norway)

6 August 2015 Second leg	Dinamo Minsk (Belarus)	1–1 (a.e.t.)	(Switzerland) Zürich	OSK Brestskiy, Brest (Note: Dinamo Minsk played their third qualifying round home match at OSK Brestskiy, Brest, instead of their temporary stadium Traktor Stadium, Minsk.)
19:15	Bećiraj 118'	Report	Chermiti 4'	Attendance: 9,437; Referee: Marcin Borski (Poland)

Dinamo Minsk won 2–1 on aggregate.

=== Thun ===
==== Europa League ====
Second qualifying round

16 July 2015 First leg	Hapoel Be'er Sheva (Israel)	1–1	(Switzerland) Thun	Teddy Stadium, Jerusalem (Note: Hapoel Be'er Sheva played their home match at Teddy Stadium, Jerusalem, instead of their regular stadium Turner Stadium, Be'er Sheva.)
19:00	Hoban 26'	Report	Frontino 87' (pen.)	Attendance: 11,796; Referee: Bart Vertenten (Belgium)

23 July 2015 Second leg	Thun (Switzerland)	2–1	(Israel) Hapoel Be'er Sheva	Stockhorn Arena, Thun
19:30	Ferreira 40', 72'	Report	Ogu 6'	Attendance: 4,017; Referee: Craig Pawson (England)

Thun won 3–2 on aggregate.

Third qualifying round

30 July 2015 First leg	Thun (Switzerland)	0–0	(Liechtenstein) Vaduz	Stockhorn Arena, Thun
19:30		Report		Attendance: 3,407; Referee: Jakob Kehlet (Denmark)

6 August 2015 Second leg	Vaduz (Liechtenstein)	2–2	(Switzerland) Thun	Rheinpark Stadion, Vaduz
19:30	Costanzo 32'; Neumayr 45+1'	Report	Rojas 38'; Buess 65'	Attendance: 2,788; Referee: István Kovács (Romania)

2–2 on aggregate. Thun won on away goals.

Play-off round

20 August 2015 First leg	Sparta Prague (Czech Republic)	3–1	(Switzerland) Thun	Generali Arena, Prague
19:00	Costa 43'; Dočkal 45+1', 90+4'	Report	Sutter 5'	Attendance: 12,448; Referee: Danny Makkelie (Netherlands)

27 August 2015 Second leg	Thun (Switzerland)	3–3	(Czech Republic) Sparta Prague	Stockhorn Arena, Thun
19:30	Ferreira 33', 81'; Munsy 50'	Report	Dočkal 10'; Hušbauer 21'; Costa 71'	Attendance: 6,024; Referee: Ruddy Buquet (France)

Sparta Prague won 6–4 on aggregate.

=== Sion ===
==== Europa League ====
Group stage

17 September 2015 Matchday 1	Sion (Switzerland)	2–1	(Russia) Rubin Kazan	Stade de Tourbillon, Sion
19:00	Konaté 11', 82'	Report	Kanunnikov 65'	Attendance: 7,000; Referee: Andreas Ekberg (Sweden)

1 October 2015 Matchday 2	Liverpool (England)	1–1	(Switzerland) Sion	Anfield, Liverpool
21:05	Lallana 4'	Report	Assifuah 18'	Attendance: 37,252; Referee: Slavko Vinčić (Slovenia)

22 October 2015 Matchday 3	Bordeaux (France)	0–1	(Switzerland) Sion	Nouveau Stade de Bordeaux, Bordeaux
21:05		Report	Lacroix 21'	Attendance: 18,318; Referee: Aleksandar Stavrev (Macedonia)

5 November 2015 Matchday 4	Sion (Switzerland)	1–1	(France) Bordeaux	Stade de Tourbillon, Sion
19:00	Chantôme 90+4' (o.g.)	Report	Touré 67'	Attendance: 9,000; Referee: Ivan Kružliak (Slovakia)

26 November 2015 Matchday 5	Rubin Kazan (Russia)	2–0	(Switzerland) Sion	Kazan Arena, Kazan
17:00	Georgiev 72'; Dević 90'	Report		Attendance: 15,116; Referee: Halis Özkahya (Turkey)

10 December 2015 Matchday 6	Sion (Switzerland)	0–0	(England) Liverpool	Stade de Tourbillon, Sion
19:00		Report		Attendance: 10,000; Referee: Michael Koukoulakis (Greece)

Final group table

Pos	Team	Pld	W	D	L	GF	GA	GD	Pts	Qualification
1	(England) Liverpool	6	2	4	0	6	4	+2	10	Advance to knockout phase
2	(Switzerland) Sion	6	2	3	1	5	5	0	9	Advance to knockout phase
3	(Russia) Rubin Kazan	6	1	3	2	6	6	0	6	
4	(France) Bordeaux	6	0	4	2	5	7	−2	4	

Source: Soccerway
Rules for classification: Group stage tiebreakers

Knockout phase

Round of 32

18 February 2016 First leg	Sion (Switzerland)	1–2	(Portugal) Braga	Stade de Tourbillon, Sion
21:05	Konaté 53'	Report	Stojiljković 13'; Rafa 61'	Attendance: 9,000; Referee: Yevhen Aranovsky (Ukraine)

24 February 2016 Second leg	Braga (Portugal)	2–2	(Switzerland) Sion	Estádio Municipal, Braga
18:00	Josué 27' (pen.); Stojiljković 48'	Report	Gekas 16', 29'	Attendance: 6,759; Referee: Liran Liany (Israel)

Braga won 4–3 on aggregate.

=== Vaduz ===
==== Europa League ====
First qualifying round

2 July 2015 First leg	La Fiorita (San Marino)	0–5	(Liechtenstein) Vaduz	San Marino Stadium, Serravalle
20:30		Report	Schürpf 5'; Sutter 26'; Pergl 41'; Abegglen 78'; Ciccone 90+2'	Attendance: 649; Referee: Irfan Peljto (Bosnia and Herzegovina)

9 July 2015 Second leg	Vaduz (Liechtenstein)	5–1	(San Marino) La Fiorita	Rheinpark Stadion, Vaduz
19:45	Kamber 25', 33'; Schürpf 41'; Muntwiler 71'; Lang 84'	Report	Tommasi 74'	Attendance: 727; Referee: Suren Baliyan (Armenia)

Vaduz won 10–1 on aggregate.

Second qualifying round

16 July 2015 First leg	Vaduz (Liechtenstein)	3–1	(Estonia) Nõmme Kalju	Rheinpark Stadion, Vaduz
19:45	Ciccone 20'; Neumayr 53', 90+2'	Report	Wakui 86'	Attendance: 912; Referee: Petur Reinert (Faroe Islands)

23 July 2015 Second leg	Nõmme Kalju (Estonia)	0–2	(Liechtenstein) Vaduz	A. Le Coq Arena, Tallinn (Note: Nõmme Kalju played their home matches at A. Le Coq Arena, Tallinn, instead of their regular stadium Hiiu Stadium, Tallinn.)
18:00		Report	Caballero 59'; Aliji 74'	Attendance: 1,030; Referee: Raymond Crangle (Northern Ireland)

Vaduz won 5–1 on aggregate.

Third qualifying round

30 July 2015 First leg	Thun (Switzerland)	0–0	(Liechtenstein) Vaduz	Stockhorn Arena, Thun
19:30		Report		Attendance: 3,407; Referee: Jakob Kehlet (Denmark)

6 August 2015 Second leg	Vaduz (Liechtenstein)	2–2	(Switzerland) Thun	Rheinpark Stadion, Vaduz
19:30	Costanzo 32'; Neumayr 45+1'	Report	Rojas 38'; Buess 65'	Attendance: 2,788; Referee: István Kovács (Romania)

2–2 on aggregate. Thun won on away goals.

== Sources ==
- Josef Zindel (2018). FC Basel 1893. Die ersten 125 Jahre (in German). Basel: Friedrich Reinhardt Verlag. ISBN 978-3-7245-2305-5.
- Switzerland 2014/15 RSSSF

Preceded by 2014–15	Seasons in Swiss football	Succeeded by 2016–17
