= 2014–15 in Swiss football =

Football in Switzerland
- Season: 2014–15

Men's football
- Super League: Basel
- Challenge League: Lugano
- Promotion League: Xamax
- Swiss Cup: Sion

The following is a summary of the 2014–15 season of competitive football in Switzerland.

== Men's national team ==
The home team is on the left column; the away team is on the right column.

Win Draw Loss

=== UEFA Euro 2016 qualification ===
8 September 2014	Switzerland	0 – 2	England	Basel, Switzerland
20:45 CEST		report	59', 90+4' Welbeck	Stadium: St. Jakob-Park; Attendance: 35'500; Referee: Cüneyt Çakır (Turkey)

9 October 2014	Slovenia	1 – 0	Switzerland	Maribor, Slovenia
20:45 CEST	Novaković 79' (pen.)	report		Stadium: Ljudski vrt Attendance: 8'500; Referee: Wolfgang Stark (Germany)

14 October 2014	San Marino	0 – 4	Switzerland	Serravalle, San Marino
20:45 CET		report	10', 24' Seferovic; 30' Džemaili; 79' Shaqiri	Stadium: San Marino Stadium; Attendance: 2'289; Referee: Tony Chapron (France)

15 November 2014	Switzerland	4 – 0	Lithuania	St. Gallen, Switzerland
20:45 CET	Drmić 66'; Schär 67'; Shaqiri 79', 88'	report		Stadium: AFG Arena; Attendance: 17'300; Referee: Svein Oddvar Moen (Norway)

27 March 2015	Switzerland	3 – 0	Estonia	Lucerne, Switzerland
20:45 CET	Schär 17'; Xhaka 27' (yellow card) 56'; Seferovic 80'; Frei (yellow card) 90+2'	Summary	Zenjov (yellow card) 44'; Dmitrijev (yellow card) 51'	Stadium: Swissporarena; Attendance: 14,500; Referee: Danny Makkelie (Netherlands)

14 June 2015	Lithuania	1 – 2	Switzerland	Vilnius, Lithuania
20:45 CET	Černych 64'	Report	69' Drmić; 84' Shaqiri	Stadium: LFF Stadium; Attendance: 4'600; Referee: Craig Thomson (Scotland)

=== Friendly matches ===
18 November 2014	Poland	2 – 2	Switzerland	Wrocław, Poland
CET	Jędrzejczyk 45+1'; Milik 62'; Żyro (yellow card) 83' (red card)	report	4' Drmić; 88' Frei	Stadium: Stadion Miejski; Attendance: 40'331; Referee: Kristinn Jakobsson (Iceland)

31 March 2015	Switzerland	1 – 1	United States	Zürich, Switzerland
18:00 CET	Stocker 80'	Summary	Shea 45'; Altidore (yellow card) 68' (yellow-red card)	Stadium: Letzigrund; Attendance: 16,100; Referee: Luca Banti (Italy)

10 June 2015	Switzerland	3 – 0	Liechtenstein	Thun, Switzerland
20:15 CET	Džemaili 29', 68'; Shaqiri 60'	Summary		Stadium: Stockhorn Arena; Attendance: 8'100; Referee: Richard Trutz (Slovakia)

=== Non-official Games ===
4 September 2014	FC Rapperswil-Jona (Switzerland)	0 – 6	Switzerland	Rapperswil-Jona, Switzerland
18:00 CET		report	55', 62', 88' Drmić; 76' Shaqiri; 80' Djourou; 81' Džemaili	Stadium: Stadion Grünfeld; Attendance: 2'500

== Women's national team ==
The home team is on the left column; the away team is on the right column.

Win Draw Loss

=== World Cup 2015 qualifying ===
17 September 2014	Malta	0 – 5	Switzerland	Ħamrun, Malta
17:00 CET		Report	10', 84', 87' (pen.) Crnogorčević; 52', 68' Bürki	Stadium: Victor Tedesco Stadium; Referee: Gordana Kuzmanović (Serbia)

=== 2015 FIFA Women's World Cup ===
8 June 2015	Japan	1 – 0	Switzerland	Vancouver, Canada
19:00 PDT (UTC−7)	Miyama 29' (pen.)	Report		Stadium: BC Place; Attendance: 25'942; Referee: Lucila Venegas (Mexico)

12 June 2015	Switzerland	10 – 1	Ecuador	Vancouver, Canada
16:00 PDT (UTC−7)	Ponce 24', 71' (o.g.); Aigbogun 45+2'; Humm 47', 49', 52'; Bachmann 60' (pen.), 61', 81'; Moser 76'	Report	Ponce 64' (pen.)	Stadium: BC Place; Attendance: 31'441; Referee: Rita Gani (Malaysia)

16 June 2015	Switzerland	1 – 2	Cameroon	Edmonton, Canada
15:00 MDT (UTC−6)	Crnogorčević 24'	Report	47' Onguéné; 62' Ngono Mani	Stadium: Commonwealth Stadium; Attendance: 10'177; Referee: Claudia Umpierrez (Uruguay)

21 June 2015	Canada	1 – 0	Switzerland	Vancouver, Canada
16:30 PDT (UTC−7)	Bélanger 52'	Report		Stadium: BC Place; Attendance: 53'855; Referee: Anna-Marie Keighley (New Zealand)

=== 2015 Algarve Cup ===
4 March 2015	Switzerland	2 – 0	Iceland	Lagos, Portugal
15:00 GMT	Dickenmann 57' (pen.) 66'			Stadium: Estádio Municipal; Referee: Ri Hyang-ok (North Korea)

6 March 2015	United States	3 – 0	Switzerland	Vila Real de Santo António, Portugal
17:00 GMT	Morgan 55'; Rodriguez 72'; Wambach 81'	Report		Stadium: Complexo Desportivo; Referee: Cristina Dorcioman (Romania)

9 March 2015	Norway	2 – 2	Switzerland	Albufeira, Portugal
17:30 GMT	Rønning 51'; Herlovsen 84'		Kiwic 61'; Humm 62'	Stadium: Estádio Municipal; Referee: Claudia Rodriguez (Uruguay)

11 March 2015	Brazil	4 – 1	Switzerland	Albufeira, Portugal
15:00 GMT	Marta 30' 77'; Bia 37'; Andressa 82'		Wälti 45'	Stadium: Estádio Municipal; Referee: Jana Adámková (Czech Republic)

=== Friendly matches ===
20 August 2014	United States	4 – 1	Switzerland	Cary, NC, United States
19:30 ET	Rapinoe 3'; Lloyd 56' (pen.); Press 77'; Wambach 87' (pen.)	report	71' (pen.) Crnogorčević	Stadium: WakeMed Soccer Park; Attendance: 9'992; Referee: Ekaterina Koroleva (USA)

10 February 2015	Portugal	2 – 1	Switzerland	Cesar, Portugal
15:00 CET	Vanessa Marques 26'; Neto 60' (pen.)	report	44' Humm	Stadium: Estádio do Mergulhão; Attendance: 3'000

12 February 2015	Portugal	1 – 0	Switzerland	Santa Maria da Feira, Portugal
12:00 CET	Andreia Silva 76'	report		Stadium: Estádio Marcolino de Castro; Attendance: 500

5 April 2015	Sweden	1 – 3	Switzerland	Eskilstuna, Sweden
18:15 CET	Schelin 59'	Summary	23' Bachmann; 36' Humm; 23' Bernauer	Stadium: Tunavallen; Attendance: 3'549

27 May 2015	Switzerland	1 – 3	Germany	Baden, Switzerland
17:00 CET	Crnogorčević 2'	Summary	58' Laudehr; 64', 75' Marozsán	Stadium: Esp Stadium; Attendance: 4'200

== Domestic season ==
=== Super League ===
Pos	Team	Pld	W	D	L	GF	GA	GD	Pts	Qualification or relegation
1	Basel (C)	36	24	6	6	84	41	+43	78	Qualification for the Champions League third qualifying round
2	Young Boys	36	19	9	8	64	45	+19	66	Qualification for the Champions League third qualifying round
3	Zürich	36	15	8	13	55	48	+7	53	Qualification for the Europa League third qualifying round
4	Thun	36	13	13	10	47	45	+2	52	Qualification for the Europa League second qualifying round
5	Luzern	36	12	11	13	54	46	+8	47	
6	St. Gallen	36	13	8	15	57	65	−8	47	
7	Sion	36	12	9	15	47	48	−1	45	Qualification for the Europa League group stage (Note: Sion qualified for the UEFA Europa League group stage by winning the 2014–15 Swiss Cup.)
8	Grasshopper	36	11	10	15	50	56	−6	43	
9	Vaduz	36	7	10	19	28	59	−31	31	Qualification for the Europa League first qualifying round (Note: Vaduz qualified for the UEFA Europa League first qualifying round by winning the 2014–15 Liechtenstein Cup.)
10	Aarau (R)	36	6	12	18	31	64	−33	30	Relegation to Swiss Challenge League

Source: Swiss Super League
Rules for classification: 1) points; 2) goal difference; 3) number of goals scored
(C) Champions; (R) Relegated

=== Challenge League ===
Pos	Team	Pld	W	D	L	GF	GA	GD	Pts	Promotion or relegation
1	Lugano (C, P)	36	22	8	6	64	31	+33	74	Promotion to 2015–16 Swiss Super League
2	Servette (D, R)	36	20	7	9	51	40	+11	67	Relegation to 2015–16 1. Liga Promotion (Note: Servette did not obtain a license for the 2015-16 Challenge League season after not providing necessary financial documents and guarantees. Servette was therefore relegated to the Promotion League and Biel-Bienne remained in the league.)
3	Wohlen	36	20	4	12	57	43	+14	64	
4	Winterthur	36	15	8	13	65	49	+16	53	
5	Schaffhausen	36	13	8	15	55	54	+1	47	
6	Lausanne-Sport	36	12	8	16	47	57	−10	44	
7	Le Mont	36	10	9	17	39	56	−17	39	
8	Chiasso	36	9	12	15	30	49	−19	39	
9	Wil	36	9	10	17	47	63	−16	37	
10	Biel-Bienne	36	7	12	17	39	52	−13	33	

Source: RSSSF
Rules for classification: 1) points; 2) goal difference; 3) number of goals scored
(C) Champions; (D) Disqualified; (P) Promoted; (R) Relegated

=== Promotion League ===
Pos	Team	Pld	W	D	L	GF	GA	GD	Pts	Promotion, qualification or relegation
1	Neuchâtel Xamax (C, P)	30	22	4	4	79	31	+48	70	Promotion to Challenge League
2	FC Köniz	30	17	6	7	60	34	+26	57	
3	FC Breitenrain	30	13	10	7	50	40	+10	49	
4	SC Young Fellows Juventus	30	13	8	9	54	52	+2	47	
5	FC Sion U-21	30	13	5	12	51	50	+1	44	
6	FC Rapperswil-Jona	30	13	5	12	46	48	−2	44	
7	Étoile Carouge	30	12	7	11	41	39	+2	43	
8	FC Zürich U-21	30	13	4	13	48	50	−2	43	
9	Stade Nyonnais	30	12	6	12	39	37	+2	42	
10	FC St. Gallen U-21	30	12	5	13	52	51	+1	41	
11	FC Basel U-21	30	12	4	14	57	55	+2	40	
12	FC Tuggen	30	11	2	17	41	64	−23	35	
13	SC Brühl	30	10	3	17	45	64	−19	33	
14	BSC Old Boys Basel	30	8	7	15	42	52	−10	31	
15	FC Locarno (R)	30	8	5	17	38	54	−16	29	Relegation to 1. Liga Classic
16	SR Delémont (R)	30	6	9	15	42	64	−22	27	Relegation to 1. Liga Classic

Source: RSSSF
Rules for classification: 1) Points; 2) Goal difference; 3) Goals scored; 4) Head-to-head points 5) Draw.
(C) Champions; (P) Promoted; (R) Relegated

=== Swiss Cup ===
Basel beat St. Gallen 3–1 in the first semi-final and Sion beat Zürich 1–0 in the other. The winners of the semi-finals played against each other in the final. The match was played on 7 June 2015 in the St. Jakob-Park Basel.

7 June 2015
14:00

FC Basel	0 – 3	FC Sion
Gashi (yellow card) 46'; T. Xhaka (yellow card) 49'; F. Frei (yellow card) 64'	FCB summary ASF/SFV summary	18' (0:1) Konaté; 50' (0:2) Fernandes; 60' (0:3) Carlitos; (yellow card) 72' Zverotić

St. Jakob-Park, Basel
Attendance: 35,674 (sold out)
Referee: (Switzerland) Nikolaj Hänni

Note: Beginning of the second half with a 15 minute delay, because of the firing of pyrotechnics in the Sion fan sector.

GK	(Switzerland) Germano Vailati
DF	(Albania) Taulant Xhaka	(yellow card) 49'	(substituted off) 74'
DF	(Switzerland) Fabian Schär
DF	(Czech Republic) Marek Suchý
DF	(Ivory Coast) Adama Traoré
MF	(Switzerland) Fabian Frei	(yellow card) 65'
MF	(Albania) Shkëlzen Gashi	(yellow card) 46'
MF	(Egypt) Mohamed Elneny
MF	(Switzerland) Luca Zuffi
ST	(Switzerland) Davide Callà		(substituted off) 53'
ST	(Switzerland) Marco Streller (c)		(substituted off) 75'
Substitutes:
DF	(Egypt) Ahmed Hamoudi		(substituted on) 53'
MF	(Argentina) Matías Delgado		(substituted on) 74'
FW	(Switzerland) Albian Ajeti		(substituted on) 75'
Manager:
(Portugal) Paulo Sousa

GK	(Latvia) Andris Vaņins
DF	(Montenegro) Elsad Zverotić	(yellow card) 72'
DF	(Switzerland) Léo Lacroix
DF	(Switzerland) Reto Ziegler
DF	(The Gambia) Pa Modou Jagne
MF	(Portugal) Carlitos
MF	(Ivory Coast) Xavier Kouassi (c)
MF	(Switzerland) Vero Salatić
ST	(Switzerland) Edimilson Fernandes		(substituted off) 73'
ST	(Ghana) Ebenezer Assifuah		(substituted off) 75'
ST	(Senegal) Pape Moussa Konaté		(substituted off) 85'
Substitutes:
MF	(Switzerland) Michael Perrier		(substituted on) 73'
MF	(Switzerland) Daniel Follonier		(substituted on) 75'
MF	(Cyprus) Demetris Christofi		(substituted on) 85'
Manager:
(France) Didier Tholot

== Swiss Clubs in Europe ==
- Basel: Champions League group stage
- Grasshopper Club: Champions League third qualifying round
- Young Boys: Europa League third qualifying round
- Luzern: Europa League second qualifying round
- Zürich: Europa League play-off round
- Vaduz: Europa League first qualifying round

=== Basel ===
==== Champions League ====
Group stage

Matches

16 September 2014 Round 1	Real Madrid (Spain)	5 – 1	(Switzerland) Basel	Santiago Bernabéu, Madrid
20:45	Suchý 14' (o.g. 0:1); Bale 30' (0:2); Ronaldo 31' (0:3); Rodríguez 37' (0:4); Benzema 79' (1:5); Pepe (yellow card) 85'	FCB summary UEFA report	38' (1:4) González; (yellow card) 55' Elneny; (yellow card) 60' Samuel; (yellow card) 90+1' Xhaka	Attendance: 65,364; Referee: Damir Skomina (Slovenia)

1 October 2014 Round 2	Basel (Switzerland)	1 – 0	(England) Liverpool	St. Jakob-Park, Basel
20:45	Streller 52' (1:0); Suchý (yellow card) 60'	FCB summary UEFA report	(yellow card) 9' Sterling; (yellow card) 54' Gerrard; (yellow card) 71' Balotelli	Attendance: 36,000 (sold out); Referee: Jonas Eriksson (Sweden)

22 October 2014 Round 3	Ludogorets Razgrad (Bulgaria)	1 – 0	(Switzerland) Basel	Vasil Levski National Stadium, Sofia
20:45	Minev (yellow card) 24'; Moți (yellow card) 86'; Minev 90+2' (1:0); Espinho (yellow card) 90+3'	FCB summary UEFA report	(red card) 18' Serey Die; (yellow card) 43' Xhaka; (yellow card) 45+2' González; (yellow card) 67' Embolo; (yellow card) 85' F. Frei (C); (yellow card) 90+3' Schär	Attendance: 29,150; Referee: Deniz Aytekin (Germany)

4 November 2014 Round 4	Basel (Switzerland)	4 – 0	(Bulgaria) Ludogorets Razgrad	St. Jakob-Park, Basel
20:45	Embolo 34' (1:0); González 41' (2:0); González (yellow card) 42'; Gashi 59' (3:0); Suchý 65' (4:0)	FCB summary UEFA report	(yellow card) 84' Marcelinho	Attendance: 35,272; Referee: Stéphane Lannoy (France)

26 November 2014 Round 5	Basel (Switzerland)	0 – 1	(Spain) Real Madrid	St. Jakob-Park, Basel
20:45	P. Degen (yellow card) 44'; Suchý (yellow card) 53'; Schär (yellow card) 80'	FCB summary UEFA report	35' (0:1) Ronaldo; (yellow card) 43' Sergio Ramos; (yellow card) 48' Coentrão	Attendance: 36,000 (sold out); Referee: Milorad Mažić (Serbia)

9 December 2014 Round 6	Liverpool (England)	1 – 1	(Switzerland) Basel	Anfield, Liverpool
20:45	Leiva (yellow card) 47'; Marković (red card) 60'; Lovren (yellow card) 66'; Moreno (yellow card) 77'; Gerrard 81' (1:1)	FCB summary UEFA report	25' (0:1) Frei; (yellow card) 80' Schär	Attendance: 43,290; Referee: Björn Kuipers (Netherlands)

Notes

1. Ludogorets Razgrad play their home matches at Vasil Levski National Stadium, Sofia instead of their regular stadium, Ludogorets Arena, Razgrad.

Final group table

Pos	Team	Pld	W	D	L	GF	GA	GD	Pts	Qualification
1	(Spain) Real Madrid	6	6	0	0	16	2	+14	18	Advance to knockout phase
2	(Switzerland) Basel	6	2	1	3	7	8	−1	7	Advance to knockout phase
3	(England) Liverpool	6	1	2	3	5	9	−4	5	Transfer to Europa League
4	(Bulgaria) Ludogorets Razgrad	6	1	1	4	5	14	−9	4	

Source: UEFA
Rules for classification: Group stage tiebreakers

Round of 16

18 February 2015 First leg	Basel (Switzerland)	1 – 1	(Portugal) Porto	St. Jakob-Park, Basel
20:45	González 11' (1:0); F. Frei (yellow card) 22'; Elneny (yellow card) 26'; Samuel (yellow card) 46'; Gashi (yellow card) 57'; Suchý (yellow card) 62'	FCB summary UEFA report	(yellow card) 29' Casemiro; (yellow card) 36' Torres; (yellow card) 51' Sandro; 79' (pen. 1:1) (yellow card) 87' Danilo	Attendance: 34,464; Referee: Mark Clattenburg (England)

10 March 2015 Second leg	Porto (Portugal)	4 – 0	(Switzerland) Basel	Estádio do Dragão, Porto
20:45	Brahimi 14' (1:0); Herrera 47' (2:0); Marcano (yellow card) 55'; Casemiro 56' (3:0); Aboubakar 76' (4:0)	FCB summary UEFA report	(yellow card) 30' Gashi; (yellow card) 38' González; (yellow card) 55' Safari; (yellow card) 49' (yellow-red card) 90+1' Samuel	Attendance: 43,108; Referee: Jonas Eriksson (Sweden)

Porto won 5–1 on aggregate.

=== Grasshopper Club ===
==== Champions League ====
Third qualifying round

30 July 2014 3Q Leg 1	Grasshoppers (Switzerland)	0 – 2	(France) Lille	Zürich, Switzerland
19:00	Salatić (yellow card) 45'; Tarashaj (yellow card) 84'; Abrashi (yellow card) 85'	Report	29' Corchia; 49' Mendes	Stadium: Letzigrund; Attendance: 7'700; Referee: Aleksei Eskov (Russia)

5 August 2014 3Q Leg 2	Lille (France)	1 – 1 (3 – 1 agg.)	(Switzerland) Grasshoppers	Villeneuve-d'Ascq, France
20:30	Balmont 19'; Baša (yellow card) 45+1'; Rodelin (yellow card) 52'; Souaré (yellow card) 90+1'		(yellow card) 25' (goal) 33' Abrashi; (yellow card) 43' Sinkala; (red card) 68' Pavlović; (yellow card) 87' Lang	Stadium: Stade Pierre-Mauroy; Attendance: 25'000; Referee: Anastasios Sidiropoulos (Greece)

Lille won 3–1 on aggregate

==== Europa League ====
Play-off round

21 August 2014 First leg	Grasshopper Club Zürich (Switzerland)	1 - 2	(Belgium) Club Brugge KV	St. Gallen, Switzerland
20:15	Lang 8'; Grichting (yellow card) 15'; Salatić (yellow card) 58'; Kahraba (yellow card) 90+3'	UEFA report Soccerway summary	Jahić 14' (o.g.); Víctor Vázquez 15' (yellow card) 69'; De Bock (yellow card) 30'	Stadium: AFG Arena; Attendance: 4,253; Referee: (France) Clément Turpin

28 August 2014 Second leg	Club Brugge KV (Belgium)	1 - 0 (3 - 1 agg.)	(Switzerland) Grasshopper Club Zürich	Bruges, Belgium
21:00	Vázquez (yellow card) 42' (goal) 62'; De Bock (yellow card) 87'	UEFA report GCZ summary		Stadium: Jan Breydel Stadium; Attendance: 23'743; Referee: (Italy) Luca Banti

Notes

1. The match played at AFG Arena, St. Gallen, instead of Grasshopper's home stadium, due to the European Athletics Championships in Zürich.

Club Brugge won 3–1 on aggregate.

=== Young Boys ===
==== Europa League ====
Third qualifying round

31 July 2014 First leg	Young Boys (Switzerland)	1–0	(Cyprus) Ermis Aradippou	Stade de Suisse, Bern
19:30	Nuzzolo 58'	Report		Attendance: 7,346; Referee: Clayton Pisani (Malta)

7 August 2014 Second leg	Ermis Aradippou (Cyprus)	0–2	(Switzerland) Young Boys	Antonis Papadopoulos Stadium, Larnaca
16:00		Report	Steffen 36'; Frey 66'	Attendance: 1,000; Referee: Kevin Clancy (Scotland)

Young Boys won 3–0 on aggregate.

Play-off round

21 August 2014 First leg	Young Boys (Switzerland)	3–1	(Hungary) Debrecen	Stade de Suisse, Bern
19:30	Nuzzolo 26'; Steffen 67'; Frey 87'	Report	Sidibe 39'	Attendance: 7,927; Referee: Tom Harald Hagen (Norway)

28 August 2014 Second leg	Debrecen (Hungary)	0–0	(Switzerland) Young Boys	Nagyerdei Stadion, Debrecen
20:30		Report		Attendance: 6,393; Referee: David Fernández Borbalán (Spain)

Young Boys won 3–1 on aggregate.

Group stage

Matches

18 September 2014 Matchday 1	Young Boys (Switzerland)	5–0	(Slovakia) Slovan Bratislava	Stade de Suisse, Bern
21:05	Lecjaks 5'; Steffen 29'; Nuzzolo 63'; Nikçi 80'; Hoarau 90+2'	Report		Attendance: 10,010; Referee: Artyom Kuchin (Kazakhstan)

2 October 2014 Matchday 2	Sparta Prague (Czech Republic)	3–1	(Switzerland) Young Boys	Generali Arena, Prague
19:00	Vácha 27'; Lafata 28', 85'	Report	Hoarau 52'	Attendance: 10,205; Referee: Michael Koukoulakis (Greece)

23 October 2014 Matchday 3	Young Boys (Switzerland)	2–0	(Italy) Napoli	Stade de Suisse, Bern
19:00	Hoarau 52'; Bertone 90+2'	Report		Attendance: 24,024; Referee: Ruddy Buquet (France)

6 November 2014 Matchday 4	Napoli (Italy)	3–0	(Switzerland) Young Boys	Stadio San Paolo, Naples
21:05	De Guzmán 45+2', 65', 83'	Report		Attendance: 12,283; Referee: Kenn Hansen (Denmark)

27 November 2014 Matchday 5	Slovan Bratislava (Slovakia)	1–3	(Switzerland) Young Boys	Štadión Pasienky, Bratislava
19:00	Soumah 11'	Report	Hoarau 9' (pen.); Kubo 18', 63'	Attendance: 3,495; Referee: Pol van Boekel (Netherlands)

11 December 2014 Matchday 6	Young Boys (Switzerland)	2–0	(Czech Republic) Sparta Prague	Stade de Suisse, Bern
21:05	Hoarau 75' (pen.); Steffen 90+4'	Report		Attendance: 15,150; Referee: Hüseyin Göçek (Turkey)

Final group table

Pos	Team	Pld	W	D	L	GF	GA	GD	Pts	Qualification
1	(Italy) Napoli	6	4	1	1	11	3	+8	13	Advance to knockout phase
2	(Switzerland) Young Boys	6	4	0	2	13	7	+6	12	Advance to knockout phase
3	(Czech Republic) Sparta Prague	6	3	1	2	11	6	+5	10	
4	(Slovakia) Slovan Bratislava	6	0	0	6	1	20	−19	0	

Source: Soccerway
Rules for classification: Group stage tiebreakers

Knockout phase

Round of 32

19 February 2015 First leg	Young Boys (Switzerland)	1–4	(England) Everton	Stade de Suisse, Bern
19:00	Hoarau 10'	Report	Lukaku 24', 39', 58'; Coleman 28'	Attendance: 20,835; Referee: Jorge Sousa (Portugal)

26 February 2015 Second leg	Everton (England)	3–1 (7–2 agg.)	(Switzerland) Young Boys	Goodison Park, Liverpool
21:05	Lukaku 25' (pen.), 30'; Mirallas 42'	Report	Sanogo 13'	Attendance: 25,058; Referee: Stefan Johannesson (Sweden)

Everton won 7–2 on aggregate.

=== Luzern ===
==== Europa League ====
Second qualifying round

17 July 2014 First leg	Luzern (Switzerland)	1–1	(Scotland) St Johnstone	Swissporarena, Lucerne
19:30	Schneuwly 68'	Report	MacLean 47'	Attendance: 8,902; Referee: Benoît Bastien (France)

24 July 2014 Second leg	St Johnstone (Scotland)	1–1 (a.e.t.) (5–4 p)	(Switzerland) Luzern	McDiarmid Park, Perth
20:45	May 22' (pen.)	Report	Schneuwly 60'	Attendance: 8,486; Referee: Jonathan Lardot (Belgium)
	Penalties
	MacLean (penalty scored); Caddis (penalty scored); Mackay (penalty scored); May (penalty scored); Scobbie (penalty scored)		(penalty scored) Freuler; (penalty missed) Schneuwly; (penalty scored) Thiesson; (penalty scored) Wiss; (penalty scored) Winter

2–2 on aggregate. St Johnstone won 5–4 on penalties.

=== Zürich ===
==== Europa League ====
Play-off round

21 August 2014 First leg	Spartak Trnava (Slovakia)	1–3	(Switzerland) Zürich	Štadión FC ViOn, Zlaté Moravce
20:15	Vlasko 14' (pen.)	Report	Chermiti 4', 45+2', 58'	Attendance: 3,840; Referee: Leontios Trattou (Cyprus)

28 August 2014 Second leg	Zürich (Switzerland)	1–1	(Slovakia) Spartak Trnava	AFG Arena, St. Gallen
20:30	Chikhaoui 48'	Report	Špalek 90+2'	Attendance: 4,252; Referee: Bobby Madden (Scotland)

Zürich won 4–2 on aggregate.

Group stage

Matches

18 September 2014 Matchday 1	Apollon Limassol (Cyprus)	3–2	(Switzerland) Zürich	GSP Stadium, Nicosia
19:00	Papoulis 9'; Gullón 40'; P. Koch 87' (o.g.)	Report	Rikan 50'; Yapi Yapo 53'	Attendance: 5,662; Referee: Simon Lee Evans (Wales)

2 October 2014 Matchday 2	Zürich (Switzerland)	1–1	(Germany) Borussia Mönchengladbach	Letzigrund, Zürich
21:05	Etoundi 23'	Report	Nordtveit 25'	Attendance: 18,422; Referee: Slavko Vinčić (Slovenia)

23 October 2014 Matchday 3	Villarreal (Spain)	4–1	(Switzerland) Zürich	El Madrigal, Villarreal
21:05	Cani 6'; Vietto 57'; Bruno 60'; G. dos Santos 78'	Report	Schönbächler 43'	Attendance: 14,092; Referee: Halis Özkahya (Turkey)

6 November 2014 Matchday 4	Zürich (Switzerland)	3–2	(Spain) Villarreal	Letzigrund, Zürich
19:00	Etoundi 21'; Buff 26'; Chikhaoui 29'	Report	Pina 19'; Gerard 23'	Attendance: 8,209; Referee: Vladislav Bezborodov (Russia)

27 November 2014 Matchday 5	Zürich (Switzerland)	3–1	(Cyprus) Apollon Limassol	Letzigrund, Zürich
21:05	Djimsiti 32'; Chikhaoui 39' (pen.), 59' (pen.)	Report	Farley 23'	Attendance: 7,939; Referee: Kristo Tohver (Estonia)

11 December 2014 Matchday 6	Borussia Mönchengladbach (Germany)	3–0	(Switzerland) Zürich	Stadion im Borussia-Park, Mönchengladbach
19:00	Herrmann 31'; Hrgota 59', 64'	Report		Attendance: 44,323; Referee: Luca Banti (Italy)

Notes

1. Apollon Limassol played their home matches at GSP Stadium, Nicosia instead of their regular stadium, Tsirion Stadium, Limassol.

Final group table

Pos	Team	Pld	W	D	L	GF	GA	GD	Pts	Qualification
1	(Germany) Borussia Mönchengladbach	6	3	3	0	14	4	+10	12	Advance to knockout phase
2	(Spain) Villarreal	6	3	2	1	15	7	+8	11	Advance to knockout phase
3	(Switzerland) Zürich	6	2	1	3	10	14	−4	7	
4	(Cyprus) Apollon Limassol	6	1	0	5	4	18	−14	3	

Source: Soccerway
Rules for classification: Group stage tiebreakers

=== Vaduz ===
==== Europa League ====
First qualifying round

3 July 2014 First leg	Vaduz (Liechtenstein)	3–0	(Gibraltar) College Europa	Rheinpark Stadion, Vaduz
19:00	Sutter 6'; Schürpf 8', 72'	Report		Attendance: 1,135; Referee: Johnny Casanova (San Marino)

10 July 2014 Second leg	College Europa (Gibraltar)	0–1	(Liechtenstein) Vaduz	Victoria Stadium, Gibraltar
20:00		Report	Hasler 89'	Attendance: 824; Referee: Laurent Kopriwa (Luxembourg)

Vaduz won 4–0 on aggregate.

Second qualifying round

17 July 2014 First leg	Ruch Chorzów (Poland)	3–2	(Liechtenstein) Vaduz	Stadion Piast, Gliwice
18:00	Zieńczuk 19'; Stawarczyk 21', 74'	Report	Muntwiler 16'; Surma 60' (o.g.)	Attendance: 1,000; Referee: Radek Příhoda (Czech Republic)

24 July 2014 Second leg	Vaduz (Liechtenstein)	0–0	(Poland) Ruch Chorzów	Rheinpark Stadion, Vaduz
19:00		Report		Attendance: 2,036; Referee: Anar Salmanov (Azerbaijan)

Ruch Chorzów won 3–2 on aggregate.

1. The match was played at Stadion Piast, Gliwice instead of Ruch Chorzów's home stadium, Stadion Miejski, Chorzów, due to bad pitch conditions.

== Sources ==
- Josef Zindel (2018). FC Basel 1893. Die ersten 125 Jahre (in German). Basel: Friedrich Reinhardt Verlag. ISBN 978-3-7245-2305-5.
- Switzerland 2014/15 Swiss Cup at RSSSF

Preceded by 2013–14	Seasons in Swiss football	Succeeded by 2015–16
