= 2017–18 in Swiss football =

Football in Switzerland
- Season: 2017–18

Men's football
- Super League: Young Boys
- Challenge League: Neuchâtel Xamax
- Swiss Cup: Zürich

Women's football
- Nationalliga A: Zürich
- Swiss Cup: Zürich

The following is a summary of the 2017–18 season of competitive football in Switzerland.

== Men's national team ==
The home team is on the left column; the away team is on the right column.

Win Draw Loss

=== 2018 FIFA World Cup ===
Pos	Team	Pld	W	D	L	GF	GA	GD	Pts	Qualification
1	Brazil	3	2	1	0	5	1	+4	7	Advance to knockout stage
2	Switzerland	3	1	2	0	5	4	+1	5	Advance to knockout stage
3	Serbia	3	1	0	2	2	4	−2	3	
4	Costa Rica	3	0	1	2	2	5	−3	1	

Source: FIFA
Rules for classification: Group stage tiebreakers

17 June 2018 Group phase	Brazil	1–1	Switzerland	Rostov-on-Don, Russia
20:00 CEST	Coutinho 20'	Report	50' Zuber	Stadium: Rostov Arena; Attendance: 43,109; Referee: César Arturo Ramos (Mexico)

22 June 2018 Group phase	Serbia	1–2	Switzerland	Kaliningrad, Russia
20:00 CEST	Mitrović 5'	Report	52' Xhaka; 90' Shaqiri	Stadium: Kaliningrad Stadium; Attendance: 33,187; Referee: Felix Brych (Germany)

27 June 2018 Group phase	Switzerland	2–2	Costa Rica	Nizhny Novgorod, Russia
20:00 CEST	Džemaili 31'; Drmić 88'	Report	56' Waston; 90+3' (o.g.) Sommer	Stadium: Nizhny Novgorod Stadium; Attendance: 43,319; Referee: Clément Turpin (France)

3 July 2018 Round of 16	Sweden	1–0	Switzerland	Saint Petersburg, Russia
16:00 CEST	Forsberg 66'	Report	(red card) 90+4' Lang	Stadium: Krestovsky Stadium; Attendance: 64,042; Referee: Damir Skomina (Slovenia)

=== 2018 FIFA World Cup qualification ===
Pos	Team	Pld	W	D	L	GF	GA	GD	Pts	Qualification
1	Portugal	10	9	0	1	32	4	+28	27	Qualification to 2018 FIFA World Cup
2	Switzerland	10	9	0	1	23	7	+16	27	Advance to second round
3	Hungary	10	4	1	5	14	14	0	13	
4	Faroe Islands	10	2	3	5	4	16	−12	9	
5	Latvia	10	2	1	7	7	18	−11	7	
6	Andorra	10	1	1	8	2	23	−21	4	

Source: FIFA
Rules for classification: Qualification tiebreakers

31 August 2017 Group phase	Switzerland	3 – 0	Andorra	St. Gallen, Switzerland
20:45 CEST	Seferovic 43', 63'; Lichtsteiner 68'	Report	(yellow card) 39' Aláez; 50' Clemente; (yellow card) 61' Gómes	Stadium: Kybunpark; Attendance: 13,600; Referee: Tore Hansen (Norway)

3 September 2017 Group phase	Latvia	0 – 3	Switzerland	Riga, Latvia
20:45 CEST	Indrāns (yellow card) 37'; Dubra (yellow card) 56'; Solovjovs (yellow card) 58'; Vardanjans (yellow card) 69'	Report	9' Seferovic; 55' Džemaili; 58' (pen.) Rodríguez	Stadium: Skonto Stadium; Attendance: 7,587; Referee: Serdar Gözübüyük (Netherlands)

7 October 2017 Group phase	Switzerland	5 – 2	Hungary	Basel, Switzerland
20:45 CET	Xhaka 18'; Frei 20'; Zuber 43', 49'; Lichtsteiner 83'	Report	(yellow card) 35' (goal) 89' Ugrai; (yellow card) 44' Elek; 58' Guzmics	Stadium: St. Jakob-Park; Attendance: 32,018; Referee: Paolo Tagliavento (Italy)

10 October 2017 Group phase	Portugal	2 – 0	Switzerland	Lisbon, Portugal
20:45 CET	Djourou 43' (o.g.); André Silva 57'	Report		Stadium: Estádio da Luz; Attendance: 61,500; Referee: Cüneyt Çakır (Turkey)

9 November 2017 Playoffs	Northern Ireland	0–1	Switzerland	Belfast, Northern Ireland
20:45 CET		Report	59' (pen.) Rodríguez	Stadium: Windsor Park; Attendance: 18,269; Referee: Ovidiu Hațegan (Romania)

12 November 2017 Playoffs	Switzerland	0–0	Northern Ireland	Basel, Switzerland
18:00 CET		Report		Stadium: St. Jakob-Park; Attendance: 36'210; Referee: Felix Brych (Germany)

Switzerland won 1–0 on aggregate and qualified for the 2018 FIFA World Cup.

=== Friendly matches ===
23 March 2018	Greece	0–1	Switzerland	Athens, Greece
19:00 CET		Report	59' Džemaili	Stadium: Olympic Stadium; Attendance: 5,487; Referee: Hugo Miguel (Portugal)

27 March 2018	Switzerland	6–0	Panama	Lucerne, Switzerland
19:00 CET	Džemaili 22'; Xhaka 32' (pen.); Embolo 33'; Zuber 39'; Gavranović 49'; Frei 68'	Report		Stadium: Swissporarena; Attendance: 8,600; Referee: Oliver Drachta (Austria)

3 June 2018	Spain	1–1	Switzerland	Villarreal, Spain
21:00 CET	Odriozola 29'	Report	62' Rodríguez	Stadium: Estadio de la Cerámica; Attendance: 23,500; Referee: István Kovács (Romania)

8 June 2018	Switzerland	1–1	Japan	Lugano, Switzerland
19:00 CET	Rodríguez 42'; Seferovic 82'	Report		Stadium: Cornaredo Stadium; Attendance: 7,010; Referee: Amaury Delure (France)

== Women's national team ==
The home team is on the left column; the away team is on the right column.

Win Draw Loss

=== FIFA Women's World Cup 2019 qualification ===
Pos	Team	Pld	W	D	L	GF	GA	GD	Pts	Qualification
1	Scotland	8	7	0	1	19	7	+12	21	2019 FIFA Women's World Cup
2	Switzerland	8	6	1	1	21	5	+16	19	Play-offs
3	Poland	8	3	2	3	16	12	+4	11	
4	Albania	8	1	1	6	6	22	−16	4	
5	Belarus	8	1	0	7	5	21	−16	3	

Source: UEFA
Rules for classification: Qualification tiebreakers

15 September 2017	Albania	1 – 4	Switzerland	Elbasan, Albania
17:00 CET	Begolli 81'	Report	23' Brunner; 39' Bachmann; 41' (pen.) Crnogorčević; 67' Dickenmann	Stadium: Elbasan Arena; Referee: Amy Rayner (England)

19 September 2017	Switzerland	2 – 1	Poland	Biel/Bienne, Switzerland
19:00 CET	Bernauer 20'; Dickenmann 39'	Report	Pajor 34'	Stadium: Tissot Arena; Attendance: 800; Referee: Eleni Antoniou (Greece)

24 November 2017	Switzerland	3–0	Belarus	Schaffhausen, Switzerland
19:00 CET	Calligaris 17'; Wälti 18'; Reuteler 56'	Report		Stadium: LIPO Park; Attendance: 2'017; Referee: Cheryl Foster (Wales)

28 November 2017	Switzerland	5–1	Albania	Biel/Bienne, Switzerland
19:00 CET	Ismaili 8', 87'; Bachmann 35'; Kiwic 73'; Calligaris 80'	Report	Krasniqi 29'	Stadium: Tissot Arena; Attendance: 1'215; Referee: Petra Pavlikova (Slovakia)

5 April 2018	Switzerland	1–0	Scotland	Schaffhausen, Switzerland
19:00 CET	Dickenmann 32'	Report		Stadium: LIPO Park; Attendance: 2'504; Referee: Olga Zadinová (Czech Republic)

12 June 2018	Belarus	0–5	Switzerland	Minsk, Belarus
17:00 CET		Report	Crnogorčević 5' (pen.); Dickenmann 18', 55'; Karachun 34' (o.g.); Calligaris 76'	Stadium: FC Minsk Stadium; Attendance: 300; Referee: Viola Raudziņa (Latvia)

=== 2018 Cyprus Women's Cup ===
28 February 2018 Group A	Italy	0–3	Switzerland	Larnaca, Cyprus
17:00 CET		Report	4' Bonansea; 33' Bergamaschi; 87' Girelli	Stadium: Antonis Papadopoulos Stadium

2 March 2018 Group A	Switzerland	4–0	Finland	Larnaca, Cyprus
17:00 CET	Lehmann 17'; Widmer 52'; Crnogorčević 68'; Bernauer 77'	Report		Stadium: GSZ Stadium

5 March 2018 Group A	Switzerland	0–0	Wales	Larnaca, Cyprus
12:00 CET		Report		Stadium: GSZ Stadium

7 March 2018 3rd Place	North Korea	2–1	Switzerland	Paralimni, Cyprus
13:00 CET	Yu Jong-hui 22'; Kim Yun-mi 90+1'	Report	90+3' Rinast	Stadium: Tasos Markos Stadium

=== Friendly matches ===
22 October 2017 MS&AD Cup	Japan	2 – 0	Switzerland	Nagano, Japan
09:30 CET	Nakajima 69'; Tanaka 90+3'	Report		Stadium: Minami Nagano Sports Park Stadium; Attendance: 6,261; Referee: Casey Reibelt (Australia)

== Domestic season ==
=== Super League ===
Pos	Team	Pld	W	D	L	GF	GA	GD	Pts	Qualification or relegation
1	Young Boys (C)	36	26	6	4	84	41	+43	84	Qualification for the Champions League play-off round
2	Basel	36	20	9	7	72	36	+36	69	Qualification for the Champions League second qualifying round
3	Luzern	36	15	9	12	51	51	0	54	Qualification for the Europa League third qualifying round
4	Zürich	36	12	13	11	50	44	+6	49	Qualification for the Europa League group stage (Note: Zürich qualified for the Europa League group stage by winning the 2017–18 Swiss Cup.)
5	St. Gallen	36	14	3	19	52	72	−20	45	Qualification for the Europa League second qualifying round
6	Sion	36	11	9	16	53	56	−3	42	
7	Thun	36	12	6	18	53	68	−15	42	
8	Lugano	36	12	6	18	38	55	−17	42	
9	Grasshopper	36	10	9	17	43	52	−9	39	
10	Lausanne-Sport (R)	36	9	8	19	46	67	−21	35	Relegation to Swiss Challenge League

Source: Swiss Super League
Rules for classification: 1) Points; 2) Goal difference; 3) Goals scored; 4) Head-to-head goal difference; 5) Away goals scored; 6) Draw.
(C) Champions; (R) Relegated

=== Challenge League ===
Pos	Team	Pld	W	D	L	GF	GA	GD	Pts	Promotion or relegation
1	Neuchâtel Xamax (C, P)	36	26	7	3	82	39	+43	85	Promotion to 2018–19 Swiss Super League
2	Schaffhausen	36	21	1	14	70	51	+19	64	
3	Servette	36	17	11	8	56	38	+18	62	
4	Vaduz (Note: Vaduz qualified for the 2018–19 UEFA Europa League as winners of the 2017–18 Liechtenstein Cup.)	36	16	11	9	66	50	+16	59	Qualification for the Europa League first qualifying round
5	Rapperswil-Jona	36	16	8	12	53	45	+8	56	
6	Aarau	36	12	8	16	53	62	−9	44	
7	Wil	36	9	12	15	40	50	−10	39	
8	Chiasso (Note: Chiasso were deducted three points for licence rules violation)	36	11	6	19	42	60	−18	36	
9	Winterthur	36	7	11	18	45	60	−15	32	
10	Wohlen (Note: Wohlen waived license application and will not continue professional football in the 2018–19 season.) (R)	36	3	9	24	41	93	−52	18	Relegation to 2018-19 Swiss Promotion League

Source: RSSSF
Rules for classification: 1) Points; 2) Goal difference; 3) Goals scored; 4) Head-to-head goal difference; 5) Away goals scored; 6) Draw.
(C) Champions; (P) Promoted; (R) Relegated

=== Promotion League ===
Pos	Team	Pld	W	D	L	GF	GA	GD	Pts	Promotion, qualification or relegation
1	SC Kriens (C, P)	30	22	3	5	76	31	+45	69	2017/2018 Promotion League Champion
2	FC Stade Nyonnais	30	20	4	6	64	33	+31	64	directly qualified for 2018/2019 Swiss Cup
3	Yverdon-Sport	30	18	2	10	64	48	+16	56	directly qualified for 2018/2019 Swiss Cup
4	FC Basel U-21	30	12	9	9	53	44	+9	45	
5	FC Zürich U-21	30	11	10	9	60	50	+10	43	
6	FC Stade Lausanne-Ouchy	30	12	7	11	56	57	−1	43	
7	FC Köniz	30	12	6	12	56	53	+3	42	
8	SC Brühl	30	10	10	10	51	45	+6	40	
9	FC Breitenrain	30	11	6	13	56	61	−5	39	
10	FC Sion U-21	30	9	11	10	47	46	+1	38	
11	SC Cham	30	9	11	10	50	58	−8	38	
12	SC YF Juventus	30	10	6	14	48	57	−9	36	
13	FC Bavois	29	9	7	13	38	56	−18	34	
14	BSC Old Boys (Note: BSC Old Boys Basel voluntarily relegated at the end of the season.) (R)	30	8	7	15	48	61	−13	31	Relegation to 2018–19 1. Liga Classic
15	FC La Chaux-de-Fonds	31	8	6	17	37	50	−13	30	
16	FC United Zürich (R)	30	5	3	22	35	89	−54	18	Relegation to 2018–19 1. Liga Classic

Source: RSSSF
Rules for classification: 1) Points; 2) Goal difference; 3) Goals scored; 4) Head-to-head points; 5) Away goals scored; 6) Draw.
(C) Champions; (P) Promoted; (R) Relegated

=== Swiss Cup ===
FC Zürich beat Grasshopper Club Zürich 2–1 in the first drawn semi-final and were considered as home team for the final. BSC Young Boys beat FC Basel 2–0 in the other semi-final. The match was played on 27 May 2018 at the Stade de Suisse in Bern.

Final

27 May 2018
14:00 (CEST)

Zürich	2–1	Young Boys
Frey 11' (yellow card) 24'; Sarr (yellow card) 59' (yellow-red card) 67'; Marchesano 75'; Thelander (yellow card) 83'; Brecher (yellow card) 89'	SFV summary	Nuhu (yellow card) 15'; Sanogo (yellow card) 24'; Sulejmani 80'

Stade de Suisse, Bern
Attendance: 30,000
Referee: (Switzerland) Adrien Jaccottet

== Swiss Clubs in Europe ==
=== BSC Young Boys ===
==== UEFA Champions League qualifying phase ====
26 July 2017 CL Qualification R3	Dynamo Kyiv (Ukraine)	3 – 1	(Switzerland) Young Boys	Kyiv, Ukraine
18:30 (CET)	Yarmolenko 15'; Mbokani 34'; Harmash 90+3'	Report	90+1' Fassnacht	Stadium: NSC Olimpiyskiy Stadium; Attendance: 36,341; Referee: Andreas Ekberg (Sweden)

2 August 2017 CL Qualification R3	Young Boys (Switzerland)	2 – 0	(Ukraine) Dynamo Kyiv	Bern, Switzerland
20:15 (CET)	Hoarau 13' (pen.); Lotomba 90'	Report		Stadium: Stade de Suisse; Attendance: 13,303; Referee: Paweł Gil (Poland)

3–3 on aggregate. Young Boys won on away goals.

15 August 2017 CL Qualification PO	Young Boys (Switzerland)	0 – 1	(Russia) CSKA Moscow	Bern, Switzerland
20:45 (CET)		Report	90+1' (o.g.) Nuhu	Stadium: Stade de Suisse; Attendance: 20,003; Referee: David Fernández Borbalán (Spain)

23 August 2017 CL Qualification PO	CSKA Moscow (Russia)	2 – 0	(Switzerland) Young Boys	Moscow, Russia
20:45 (CET)	Shchennikov 45'; Dzagoev 64'	Report		Stadium: VEB Arena; Attendance: 15,560; Referee: Anastasios Sidiropoulos (Greece)

CSKA Moscow won 3–0 on aggregate.

==== UEFA Europa League group stage ====
14 September 2017 Group B	Young Boys (Switzerland)	1–1	(Serbia) Partizan	Bern, Switzerland
19:00 (CET)	Fassnacht 45'	Report	11' Janković	Stadium: Stade de Suisse; Attendance: 13,004; Referee: István Kovács (Romania)

18 September 2017 Group B	Skënderbeu Korçë (Albania)	1–1	(Switzerland) Young Boys	Elbasan, Albania
21:05 (CET)	Sowe 65'	Report	72' Assalé	Stadium: Elbasan Arena; Attendance: 3,300; Referee: Kevin Blom (Netherlands)

19 October 2017 Group B	Dynamo Kyiv (Ukraine)	2–2	(Switzerland) Young Boys	Kyiv, Ukraine
21:05 (CET)	Mbokani 34'; Morozyuk 49'	Report	17', 40' Assalé	Stadium: NSC Olimpiyskiy Stadium; Attendance: 21,789; Referee: Mattias Gestranius (Finland)

2 November 2017 Group B	Young Boys (Switzerland)	0–1	(Ukraine) Dynamo Kyiv	Bern, Switzerland
19:00 (CET)		Report	70' Buyalskyi	Stadium: Stade de Suisse; Attendance: 10,077; Referee: Tony Chapron (France)

23 November 2017 Group B	Partizan (Serbia)	2–1	(Switzerland) Young Boys	Belgrade, Serbia
21:05 (CET)	Tawamba 12'; Ožegović 53'	Report	25' Ngamaleu	Stadium: Partizan Stadium; Attendance: 20,568; Referee: Tamás Bognár (Hungary)

7 December 2017 Group B	Young Boys (Switzerland)	2–1	(Albania) Skënderbeu Korçë	Bern, Switzerland
19:00 (CET)	Hoarau 55'; Assalé 90+5'	Report	51' Gavazaj	Stadium: Stade de Suisse; Attendance: 8,209; Referee: Simon Lee Evans (Wales)

=== FC Basel ===
==== UEFA Champions League group stage ====
12 September 2017 Group A	Manchester United (England)	3–0	(Switzerland) Basel	Manchester, England
20:45 (CET)	Fellaini 35'; Lukaku 53'; Rashford 84'	Report		Stadium: Old Trafford; Attendance: 73,854; Referee: Ruddy Buquet (France)

27 September 2017 Group A	Basel (Switzerland)	5–0	(Portugal) Benfica	Basel, Switzerland
20:45 (CET)	Lang 2'; Oberlin 20', 69'; Van Wolfswinkel 60' (pen.); Riveros 76'	Report		Stadium: St. Jakob-Park; Attendance: 34,111; Referee: Craig Thomson (Scotland)

18 October 2017 Group A	CSKA Moscow (Russia)	0–2	(Switzerland) Basel	Moscow, Russia
20:45 (CET)		Report	29' Xhaka; 90' Oberlin	Stadium: VEB Arena; Attendance: 27,996; Referee: Björn Kuipers (Netherlands)

31 October 2017 Group A	Basel (Switzerland)	1–2	(Russia) CSKA Moscow	Basel, Switzerland
20:45 (CET)	Zuffi 32'	Report	63' Dzagoev; 79' Wernbloom	Stadium: St. Jakob-Park; Attendance: 33'303; Referee: Milorad Mažić (Serbia)

22 November 2017 Group A	Basel (Switzerland)	1–0	(England) Manchester United	Basel, Switzerland
20:45 (CET)	Lang 89'	Report		Stadium: St. Jakob-Park; Attendance: 36,000; Referee: Daniele Orsato (Italy)

5 December 2017 Group A	Benfica (Portugal)	0–2	(Switzerland) Basel	Lisbon, Portugal
20:45 (CET)		Report	5' Elyounoussi; 65' Oberlin	Stadium: Estádio da Luz; Attendance: 22,470; Referee: Jesús Gil Manzano (Spain)

==== UEFA Champions League knockout phase ====
13 February 2018 Round of 16	Basel (Switzerland)	0–4	(England) Manchester City	Basel, Switzerland
20:45 (CET)		Report	14', 53' Gündoğan; 18' B. Silva; 23' Agüero	Stadium: St. Jakob-Park; Attendance: 36,000; Referee: Jonas Eriksson (Sweden)

7 March 2018 Round of 16	Manchester City (England)	1–2	(Switzerland) Basel	Manchester, England
20:45 (CET)	Gabriel Jesus 8'	Report	17' Elyounoussi; 71' Lang	Stadium: City of Manchester Stadium; Attendance: 49,411; Referee: Pavel Královec (Czech Republic)

Manchester City won 5–2 on aggregate.

=== FC Lugano ===
==== UEFA Europa League group stage ====
14 September 2017 Group G	Hapoel Be'er Sheva (Israel)	2–1	(Switzerland) Lugano	Be'er Sheva, Israel
21:05 (CET)	Einbinder 2'; Tzedek 60' (pen.)	Report	67' (o.g.) Tzedek	Stadium: Turner Stadium; Attendance: 14'752; Referee: Tony Chapron (France)

28 September 2017 Group G	Lugano (Switzerland)	1–2	(Romania) Steaua București	Lucerne, Switzerland
19:00 (CET)	Bottani 14'	Report	58' Budescu; 64' Júnior Morais	Stadium: Swissporarena; Attendance: 2,680; Referee: Serhiy Boyko (Ukraine)

19 October 2017 Group G	Lugano (Switzerland)	3–2	(Czech Republic) Viktoria Plzeň	Lucerne, Switzerland
19:00 (CET)	Bottani 63'; Carlinhos 69'; Gerndt 89'	Report	76' Krmenčík; 90' Bakoš	Stadium: Swissporarena; Attendance: 2,530; Referee: Srđan Jovanović (Serbia)

2 November 2017 Group G	Viktoria Plzeň (Czech Republic)	4–1	(Switzerland) Lugano	Plzeň, Czech Republic
21:05 (CET)	Krmenčík 4', 19'; Hořava 45'; Čermák 56'	Report	56' Mariani	Stadium: Doosan Arena; Attendance: 9,483; Referee: Jonathan Lardot (Belgium

23 November 2017 Group G	Lugano (Switzerland)	1–0	(Israel) Hapoel Be'er Sheva	Lucerne, Switzerland
19:00 (CET)	Carlinhos 50'	Report		Stadium: Swissporarena; Attendance: 3,011; Referee: Harald Lechner (Austria)

7 December 2017 Group G	Steaua București (Romania)	1–2	(Switzerland) Lugano	Bucharest, Romania
21:05 (CET)	Gnohéré 60'	Report	3' Daprelà; 32' Vécsei	Stadium: Arena Națională; Attendance: 10,542; Referee: Aleksandar Stavrev (Macedonia)

=== FC Luzern ===
==== UEFA Europa League qualifying phase ====
13 July 2017 EL Qualification R2	Osijek (Croatia)	2 – 0	(Switzerland) Luzern	Osijek, Croatia
20:45 (CET)	Ejupi 66'; Grezda 79'	Report		Stadium: Stadion Gradski vrt Attendance: 7,542; Referee: Marco Guida (Italy)

20 July 2017 EL Qualification R2	Luzern (Switzerland)	2 – 1	(Croatia) Osijek	Lucerne, Switzerland
19:45 (CET)	Juric 19', 62'	Report	72' Ejupi	Stadium: Swissporarena; Attendance: 8,483; Referee: Martin Lundby (Norway)

Osijek won 3–2 on aggregate.

=== FC Sion ===
==== UEFA Europa League qualifying phase ====
27 July 2017 EL Qualification R3	Sūduva Marijampolė (Lithuania)	3 – 0	(Switzerland) Sion	Marijampolė, Lithuania
19:00 (CET)	Ricardo 3' (o.g.); Janušauskas 9'; Laukžemis 90+1'	Report		Stadium: Sūduva Stadium; Attendance: 3,167; Referee: Alexander Harkam (Austria)

2 August 2017 EL Qualification R3	Sion (Switzerland)	1 – 1	(Lithuania) Sūduva Marijampolė	Lancy, Switzerland
18:00 (CET)	Konaté 55'	Report	80' Vėževičius	Stadium: Stade de Genève; Attendance: 410; Referee: Antony Gautier (France)

Sūduva Marijampolė won 4–1 on aggregate.

Preceded by 2016–17	Seasons in Swiss football	Succeeded by 2018–19
