= Shani Tarashaj =

Swiss footballer (born 1995)

Personal information
- Full name: Shani Tarashaj
- Date of birth: 7 February 1995 (age 31)
- Place of birth: Hausen am Albis, Switzerland
- Height: 1.76 m (5 ft 9 in)
- Position: Forward

Youth career
- 2005–2006: Hausen am Albis
- 2006–2008: Red Star Zürich
- 2008–2011: Grasshoppers

Senior career*
Years	Team	Apps	(Gls)
2011–2014	Grasshoppers U21	38	(11)
2014–2015	Grasshoppers	37	(9)
2016–2020	Everton	0	(0)
2016	→ Grasshoppers (loan)	15	(3)
2016–2017	→ Eintracht Frankfurt (loan)	13	(1)
2018–2019	→ Grasshoppers (loan)	9	(0)
2019–2020	→ Emmen (loan)	0	(0)
2021–2022	Zürich U21	12	(1)
Total		124	(25)

International career
2010	Switzerland U15	1	(0)
2010–2011	Switzerland U16	10	(7)
2011–2012	Switzerland U17	10	(6)
2012	Switzerland U18	3	(3)
2013–2014	Switzerland U19	13	(11)
2014–2015	Switzerland U20	4	(1)
2014–2016	Switzerland U21	7	(5)
2016	Switzerland	5	(0)
- * Club domestic league appearances and goals

Shani Tarashaj (born 7 February 1995) is a Swiss former professional footballer who played as a forward.

== Club career ==
Tarashaj was born in Hausen am Albis, Switzerland. He grew up in youth teams of Grasshopper Club Zürich. Tarashaj made his Swiss Super League debut on 2 August 2014, coming on as a substitute for Alexander Merkel in a 0–0 draw against FC Sion. Tarashaj started 2015–16 by scoring 5 goals in his first 4 games, including two braces against FC Zurich and FC Lugano. His contract with Grasshopper was renewed, extended to 2019.

On 7 January 2016, Tarashaj joined English club Everton on a 4 1/2-year deal. He was loaned back to Grasshopper, until the end of the season so that he could complete his national service. He was loaned to German club Eintracht Frankfurt for the 2016–17 season.

On 19 July 2018, Tarashaj returned to Grasshopper on a season-long loan deal with an option to make the deal permanent.

Tarashaj moved to Dutch side FC Emmen on a two-season loan deal in July 2019. His loan was cancelled early in October 2020, and later on 13 October, it was announced that Tarashaj had departed Everton by mutual consent.

On 11 January 2021, Tarashaj returned to Switzerland, joining fellow club Zürich, initially linking up with the club's under–21 side.

On 7 October 2022, Tarashaj retired from football aged 27, primarily due to injuries.

== International career ==
=== Switzerland ===
Tarashaj was eligible to represent three countries on international level, either Albania, Kosovo or Switzerland. From 2010, until 2016, Tarashaj has been part of Switzerland at youth international level, respectively has been part of all youth teams and he with these teams played 48 matches and scored 33 goals.

On 18 March 2016, Tarashaj received a call-up from senior Swiss team for the friendly matches against Republic of Ireland and Bosnia and Herzegovina. His senior debut came seven days later in the friendly match against Republic of Ireland after coming on as a substitute at 71st minute in place of Blerim Džemaili. On 30 May 2016, Tarashaj was named as part of the Switzerland squad for UEFA Euro 2016, but only made a single appearance, coming on as a late substitute against Romania.

=== Proposed Kosovo switch ===
In July 2016, Tarashaj after the end of UEFA Euro 2016 applied for a Kosovo passport at the Kosovan Consulate in Zürich and after receiving the passport, he attempted to switch from Switzerland to Kosovo, but this switch was rejected by FIFA, because he had played competitive matches with Switzerland after Kosovo's admission to UEFA and FIFA.

=== Return to Switzerland ===
On 7 October 2016, Tarashaj after not being able to switch to Kosovo, returned to Switzerland, where he played with under-21 team in a 2017 UEFA European Under-21 Championship qualification match against Norway after being named in the starting line-up. Three days later, he was named as a senior team substitute in a 2018 FIFA World Cup qualification match against Andorra.

== Personal life ==
Born and raised in Switzerland, Tarashaj is of Kosovo Albanian origin from Prizren. In December 2019, he completed his military service in the Swiss Armed Forces. On 28 June 2021, Tarashaj entered politics by becoming a member of the Diaspora branch of the Democratic Party of Kosovo in Zürich.

== Career statistics ==
As of 6 May 2016

Appearances and goals by club, season and competition
Club	Season	League			National Cup		League Cup		Continental		Other		Total	
Club	Season	Division	Apps	Goals	Apps	Goals	Apps	Goals	Apps	Goals	Apps	Goals	Apps	Goals
Grasshopper Club Zürich	2014–15	Swiss Super League	19	1	1	1	0	0	4	0	0	0	24	2
Grasshopper Club Zürich	2015–16	Swiss Super League	18	8	1	0	0	0	0	0	0	0	19	8
Grasshopper Club Zürich	2015–16 (loan)	Swiss Super League	15	3	0	0	0	0	0	0	0	0	15	3
Grasshopper Club Zürich	Total		52	12	2	1	0	0	4	0	0	0	58	13
Everton	2016–17	Premier League	0	0	0	0	0	0	0	0	0	0	0	0
Everton	Total		0	0	0	0	0	0	0	0	0	0	0	0
Career total			52	12	2	1	0	0	4	0	0	0	58	13

== Honours ==
- Swiss Super League Young Player of the Year: 2015–16
