= Moreno Costanzo =

Swiss footballer (born 1988)

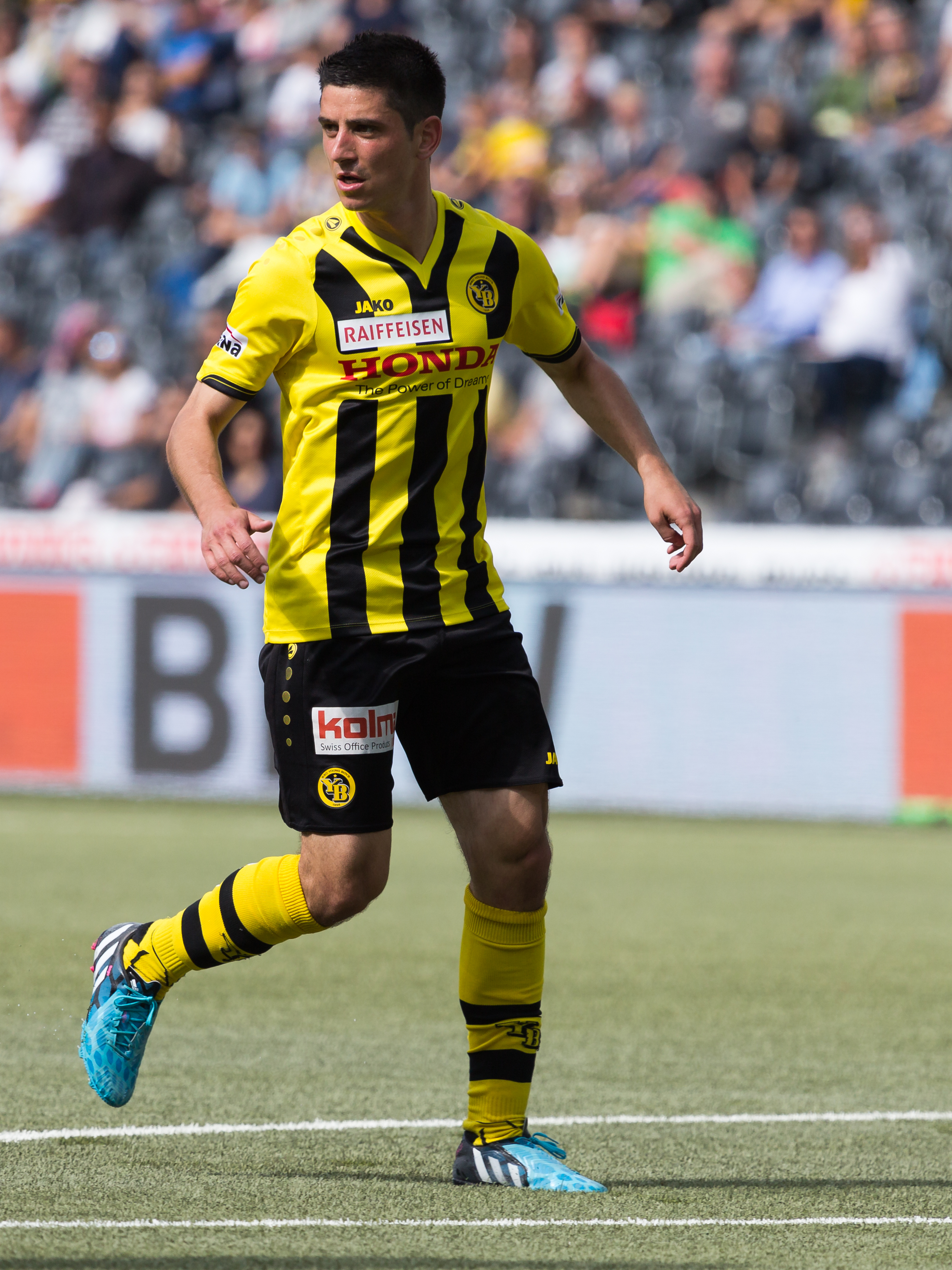

Personal information
- Date of birth: 20 February 1988 (age 38)
- Place of birth: Wil, Switzerland
- Height: 1.81 m (5 ft 11 in)
- Position: Midfielder

Youth career
- 1998–2006: St. Gallen

Senior career*
Years	Team	Apps	(Gls)
2006–2010	St. Gallen	63	(28)
2006	→ FC Wil (loan)	6	(0)
2006–2007	St. Gallen U-21	16	(5)
2010–2016	Young Boys	59	(13)
2015	→ Aarau (loan)	14	(2)
2015–2016	→ Vaduz (loan)	33	(6)
2016–2017	Vaduz	24	(6)
2017–2019	Thun	27	(6)
2019–2020	St. Gallen	7	(0)

International career
2008–2011	Switzerland U21	14	(1)
2010–2011	Switzerland	7	(1)
- * Club domestic league appearances and goals

Moreno Costanzo (born 20 February 1988) is a Swiss former professional footballer who played as a midfielder.

== Career ==
Costanzo's career started with the youth teams of FC Wil. In 2006, he signed a contract at FC St. Gallen, where he played for the reserve squad only. He subsequently was on loan with FC Wil and played six games in the Swiss Challenge League without scoring. After his return to St. Gallen, the club were relegated to the Challenge League. In the 2008–09 season he scored 14 times in 27 games for his club, which successfully achieved promotion to the first division of Swiss professional football. Currently, he plays for FC Vaduz

He gave his debut for the Switzerland national team in a friendly against Austria national team in August 2010, where he scored to give Switzerland a 1–0 lead only 90 seconds after his substitution in the second half. 2015 he had been lent by BSC Young Boys to FC Aarau.

=== International goals ===
Scores and results list Switzerland's goal tally first.

No.	Date	Venue	Opponent	Score	Result	Competition
1.	8 November 2010	Wörthersee Stadion, Klagenfurt, Austria	Austria	0-1	0–1	Friendly

== Honours ==
FC Vaduz

- Liechtenstein Football Cup (2): 2016, 2017
