= Fabienne Humm =

Swiss footballer (born 1986)

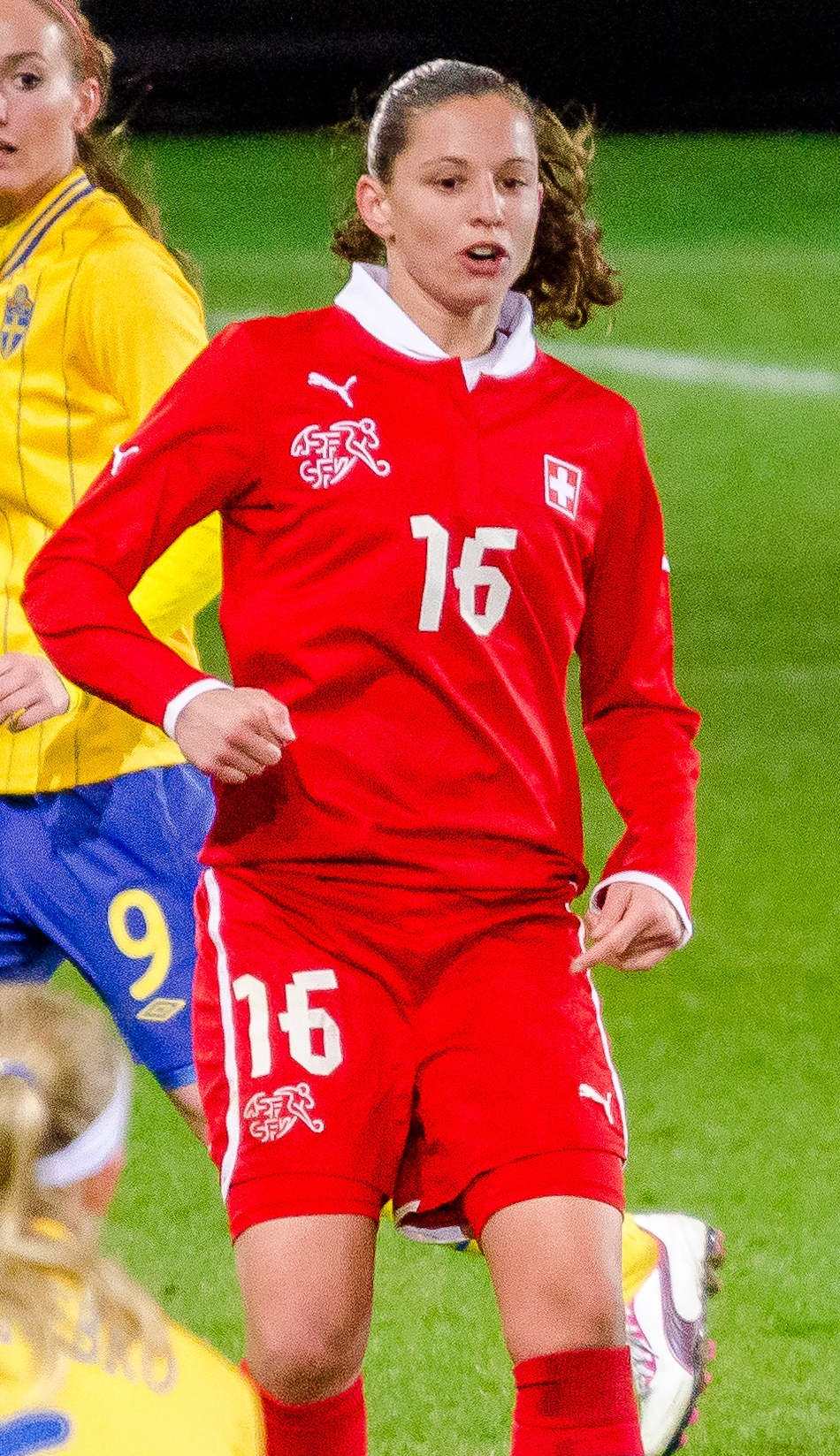
- Humm in 2012

Personal information
- Full name: Fabienne Valérie Humm
- Date of birth: 20 December 1986 (age 39)
- Place of birth: Zürich, Switzerland
- Height: 1.65 m (5 ft 5 in)
- Positions: Midfielder; forward

Youth career
- 1994–2001: FC Windisch
- 2001–2002: FC Sursee
- 2002–2006: FC Windisch

Senior career*
Years	Team	Apps	(Gls)
2006–2009	FC Schlieren		
2009–2024	FC Zürich	273	(236)

International career^{‡}
2012–2023	Switzerland	79	(26)
- * Club domestic league appearances and goals ‡ National team caps and goals as of 17 August 2024

Fabienne Valérie Humm (born 20 December 1986) is a Swiss former footballer who played as a forward. Since her debut in May 2012, she's also a member of the Swiss Women's Football National Team.

Humm was a late bloomer who did not make her national team debut until the age of 26. In contrast to most of her international teammates, she decided to remain an amateur footballer. Despite playing at the highest levels, including a World Cup, European Championships or the UEFA Women's Champions League, she never gave up her full-time job in an office of a logistic company.

At the 2015 FIFA Women's World Cup, Humm scored the fastest hat-trick in FIFA Women's World Cup history. She struck three goals in five minutes in Switzerland's 10–1 drubbing of Ecuador.

In October 2022 Humm scored the decisive, 2-1 extra-time winner over Wales in the 2023 World Cup playoffs that secured Switzerland a spot at the tournament only for the second time ever.

Humm has also represented Switzerland at beach soccer, where she became an expert at the overhead kick.
