= Luca Zuffi =

Swiss footballer (born 1990)

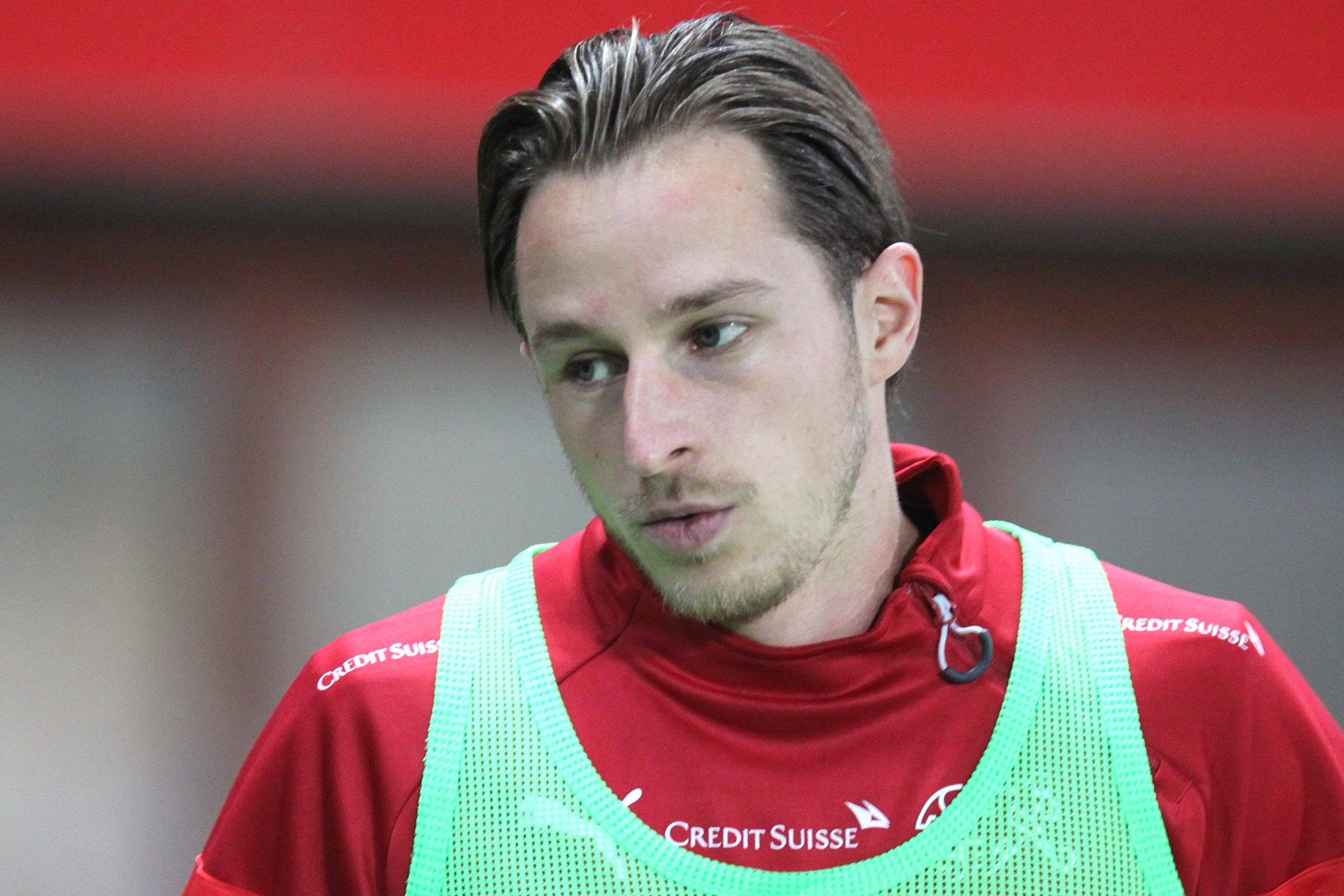
- Zuffi with Switzerland in 2015

Personal information
- Date of birth: 27 March 1990 (age 36)
- Place of birth: Winterthur, Switzerland
- Height: 1.80 m (5 ft 11 in)
- Position: Midfielder

Team information
- Current team: Winterthur
- Number: 7

Youth career
- Oberwil
- Winterthur

Senior career*
Years	Team	Apps	(Gls)
2006–2013	Winterthur	87	(9)
2012–2013	→ Thun (loan)	26	(1)
2013–2014	Thun	28	(3)
2014–2021	Basel	200	(27)
2021–2023	Sion	49	(2)
2023–	Winterthur	92	(7)

International career
2005–2006	Switzerland U16	3	(0)
2006	Switzerland U17	2	(0)
2007–2008	Switzerland U18	3	(0)
2008–2009	Switzerland U19	7	(1)
2010	Switzerland U20	2	(0)
2015–2016	Switzerland	4	(0)
- * Club domestic league appearances and goals as of 28 September 2026

Luca Zuffi (born 27 March 1990) is a Swiss professional footballer who plays as midfielder for Winterthur.

== Club career ==
=== Winterthur ===
Luca Zuffi is the son of Dario Zuffi. Born in Winterthur, he started playing football at FC Oberwil, as his father was playing for FC Basel at that time. In the summer of 1998 Dario Zuffi transferred back to his home club and the family moved home to Winterthur. Therefore, Luca continued his youth football with FC Winterthur. During the 2006–07 Challenge League season he played his debut in their first team. In the following season became a regular player, scoring four goals in 18 appearances.

=== Thun ===
At the beginning of the 2012–13 Super League season Winterthur loaned Zuffi out to Thun. Because he played in 26 of their 36 league games and because they qualified to play in the 2013–14 UEFA Europa League Thun took the option and transferred Zuffi definitively to the club. Thun advanced to the group stage in which Zuffi played in all six games.

=== Basel ===
Before the start of the 2014–15 Super League season Basel announced that they had completed Zuffi's transfer to the club on a three-year contract. He made his first team league debut on 19 July 2014 in the 2–1 away win against Aarau. He scored his first goal for his new club on 9 August 2014 during the 4–1 home win against Zürich.

The season 2014–15, with Paulo Sousa as manager, was a very successful one for Basel. The championship was won for the sixth time in a row that season and in the 2014–15 Swiss Cup they reached the final. But for the third season in a row, they finished as runners-up, losing 0–3 to FC Sion in the final. Basel entered the Champions League in the group stage and reached the knockout phase as on 9 December 2014 they managed a 1–1 draw at Anfield against Liverpool. But then Basel then lost to Porto in the Round of 16. Basel played a total of 65 matches (36 Swiss League fixtures, 6 Swiss Cup, 8 Champions League and 15 test matches). The season 2014–15 was also a very successful one for Zuffi. Under trainer Paulo Sousa he totaled 52 appearances, 29 League, 3 Cup, 7 Champions League, as well 13 in test games. He scored 7 goals in these matches.

In the season 2015–16 Basel signed a new manager Urs Fischer. Zuffi had already played with Fischer as manager in Thun. With Fischer as manager Zuffi played regularly in the starting eleven. In the 2015–16 UEFA Europa League knockout phase home game in the St. Jakob-Park on 25 February 2016 Zuffi scored both goals as Basel won 2–1 against Saint-Étienne to quality for the next round. Zuffi won the Swiss Super League championship at the end of the 2015–16 Super League season for the second time and at the end of the 2016–17 Super League season for the third time. For the club this was the eighth title in a row and their 20th championship title in total. They also won the Swiss Cup for the twelfth time, which meant they had won the double for the sixth time in the club's history.

Under trainer Marcel Koller Basel won the Swiss Cup in the 2018–19 season. In the first round Basel beat FC Montlingen 3–0, in the second round Echallens Région 7–2 and in the round of 16 Winterthur 1–0. In the quarter-finals Sion were defeated 4–2 after extra time and in the semi-finals Zürich were defeated 3–1. All these games were played away from home. The final was held on 19 May 2019 in the Stade de Suisse Wankdorf Bern against Thun. Striker Albian Ajeti scored the first goal, Fabian Frei the second for Basel, then Dejan Sorgić netted a goal for Thun, but the end result was 2–1 for Basel. Zuffi played in five cup games, inclusive the final, and scored one goal, this being in the quarter-final against Sion.

On 22 May 2021 the club announced that Zuffi's contract that would expire 30 June 2021 would not be renewed. Between the years 2014 and 2021 Zuffi played seven seasons for Basel in a total of 327 games scoring a total of 40 goals. Exactly 200 of these games were in the Swiss Super League, 22 in the Swiss Cup, 30 in the UEFA Champions League, 19 in the UEFA Europa League and 56 were friendly games. He scored 27 goals in the domestic league, two in the domestic cup, four in the Champions League, three in the Europa League and the other four were scored during the test games.

=== Sion ===
On 17 June 2021, he signed a three-year contract with Sion.

=== Return to Winterthur ===
On 26 June 2023, Zuffi agreed to return to Winterthur on a two-year contract.

== International career ==
Zuffi made his Switzerland debut in October 2015 by starting in a 7–0 win over San Marino. He was included in the provisional squad but, however, was cut from the final squad for Euro 2016. In his time with the national team Zuffi had four appearances for his country.

== Personal life ==
Luca Zuffi is the son of the former Swiss international Dario Zuffi, who is now assistant coach for FC Winterthur. Luca has two brothers, Nico and Sandro, who are also footballers.

== Honours ==
Basel

- Swiss Super League: 2014–15, 2015–16, 2016–17
- Swiss Cup winner: 2016–17, 2018–19

Individual

- Swiss Super League Midfielder of the Year: 2015–16
