= Rahel Kiwic =

Swiss footballer (born 1991)

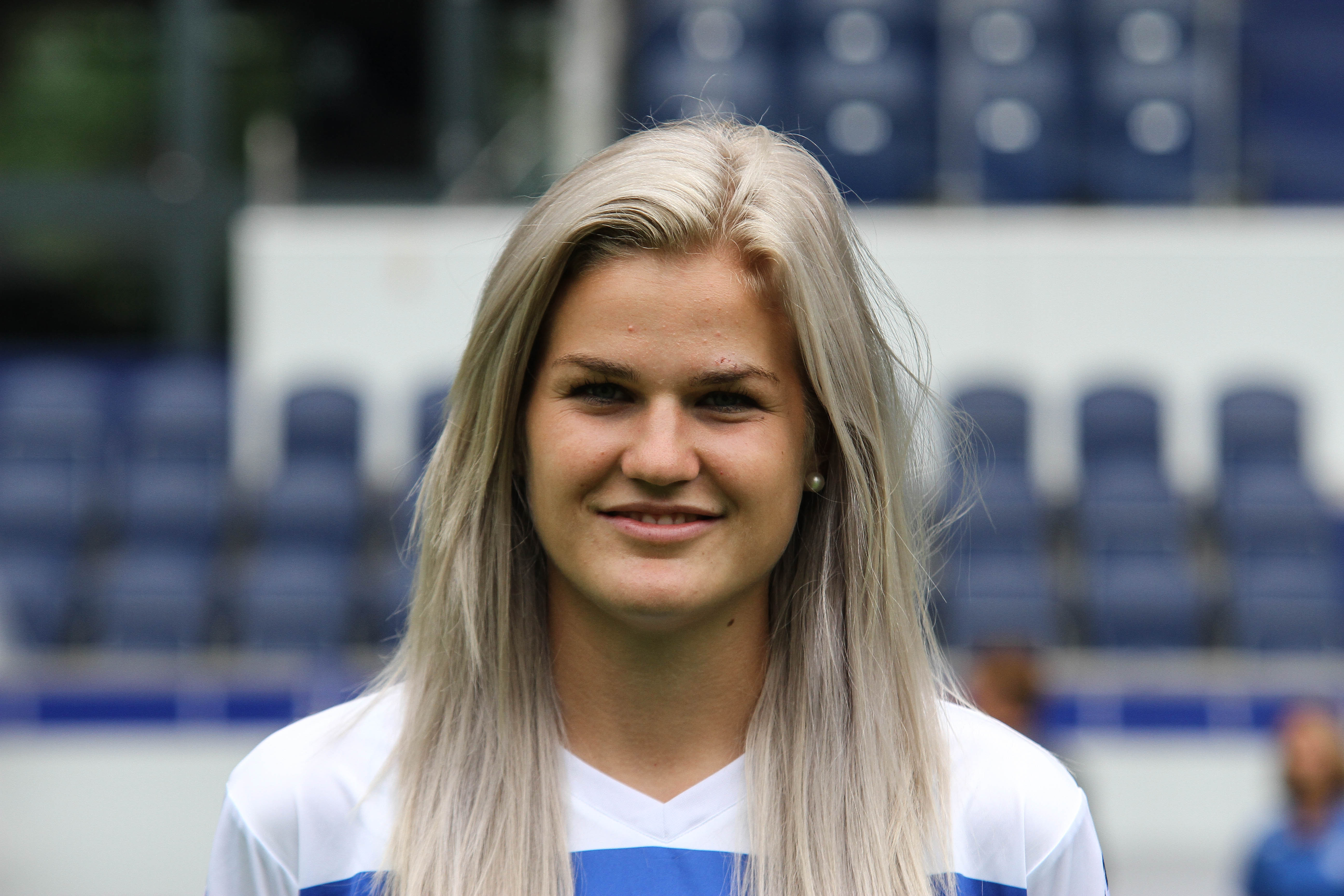
- Kiwic with MSV Duisburg in 2014

Personal information
- Full name: Rahel Marianne Kiwic
- Date of birth: 5 January 1991 (age 35)
- Place of birth: Zürich, Switzerland
- Height: 1.85 m (6 ft 1 in)
- Position: Defender

Senior career*
Years	Team	Apps	(Gls)
2005–2014	FC Zürich	54	(10)
2014–2017	MSV Duisburg	62	(11)
2017–2020	Turbine Potsdam	28	(8)
2020–2022	FC Zürich	32	(6)

International career^{‡}
2012–2022	Switzerland	83	(14)
- * Club domestic league appearances and goals ‡ National team caps and goals as of 2 August 2022

Rahel Marianne Kiwic (born 5 January 1991) is a retired Swiss football defender who last played for FC Zürich in the Swiss Nationalliga A. In March 2012 she made her debut for the Swiss national team in the 2012 Cyprus Women's Cup. As a junior international she took part in the 2010 U-20 World Cup.

== International goals ==
No.	Date	Venue	Opponent	Score	Result	Competition
1.	5 April 2014	Zug, Switzerland	Malta	6–0	11–0	2015 FIFA Women's World Cup qualification
2.	14 June 2014	Wohlen, Switzerland	Israel	2–0	9–0	2015 FIFA Women's World Cup qualification
3.	9 March 2015	Albufeira, Portugal	Norway	1–1	2–2	2015 Algarve Cup
4.	27 November 2015	Lurgan, Northern Ireland	Northern Ireland	2–0	8–1	UEFA Women's Euro 2017 qualifying
5.	2 March 2016	Den Haag, Netherlands	Netherlands	2–4	3–4	2016 UEFA Women's Olympic Qualifying Tournament
6.	9 March 2016	Rotterdam, Netherlands	Norway	2–1	2–1	2016 UEFA Women's Olympic Qualifying Tournament
7.	20 September 2016	Biel/Bienne, Switzerland	Northern Ireland	2–0	4–0	UEFA Women's Euro 2017 qualifying
8.	3 March 2017	Larnaca, Cyprus	North Korea	1–0	1–0	2017 Cyprus Women's Cup
9.	28 November 2017	Biel/Bienne, Switzerland	Albania	3–1	5–1	2019 FIFA Women's World Cup qualification
10.	4 March 2019	Vila Real de Santo António, Portugal	Portugal	2–1	3–1	2019 Algarve Cup
11.	4 October 2019	Šiauliai, Lithuania	Lithuania	2–0	3–0	UEFA Women's Euro 2022 qualifying
12.	30 November 2011	Vilnius, Lithuania	Lithuania	2–0	7–0	2023 FIFA Women's World Cup qualification
13.	8 April 2022	Bucharest, Romania	Romania	1–1	1–1	2023 FIFA Women's World Cup qualification
14.	9 July 2022	Leigh, England	Portugal	2–0	2–2	UEFA Women's Euro 2022
