= UEFA Women's Euro 2022 squads =

European football teams

Each national team will submit a squad of 23 players for UEFA Women's Euro 2022, three of whom must be goalkeepers. If a player is injured or ill severely enough to prevent their participation in the tournament before the team's first match, they can be replaced by another player. The squad list must be published no later than 10 days before the tournament's opening match.

The age listed for each player is their age as of 6 July 2022, the first day of the tournament. The numbers of caps and goals listed for each player do not include any matches played after the start of the tournament. The club listed is the club for which the player last played a competitive match prior to the tournament. The nationality for each club reflects the national association (not the league) to which the club is affiliated. A flag is included for coaches who are of a different nationality to their team.

== Group A ==
=== Austria ===
The squad was announced on 27 June 2022. On 4 July, Virginia Kirchberger replaced Lisa Kolb who withdrew after contracting to COVID-19 and Annabel Schasching replaced Maria Plattner who withdrew following a shoulder injury sustained in training.

Head coach: Irene Fuhrmann

No.	Pos.	Player	Date of birth (age)	Caps	Goals	Club
1	GK	Manuela Zinsberger	19 October 1995 (aged 26)	79	0	(The Football Association) Arsenal
2	DF	Marina Georgieva	13 April 1997 (aged 25)	13	0	(German Football Association) SC Sand
3	DF	Katharina Naschenweng	16 December 1997 (aged 24)	30	3	(German Football Association) 1899 Hoffenheim
4	DF	Celina Degen	16 May 2001 (aged 21)	5	1	(German Football Association) 1899 Hoffenheim
5	MF	Annabel Schasching	26 July 2002 (aged 19)	2	1	(Austrian Football Association) Sturm Graz
6	DF	Katharina Schiechtl	27 February 1993 (aged 29)	62	8	(German Football Association) Werder Bremen
7	DF	Carina Wenninger	6 February 1991 (aged 31)	116	6	(German Football Association) Bayern Munich
8	MF	Barbara Dunst	25 September 1997 (aged 24)	55	9	(German Football Association) eintracht Frankfurt
9	MF	Sarah Zadrazil	19 February 1993 (aged 29)	96	13	(German Football Association) Bayern Munich
10	MF	Laura Feiersinger	5 April 1993 (aged 29)	92	16	(German Football Association) Eintracht Frankfurt
11	DF	Viktoria Schnaderbeck (captain)	4 January 1991 (aged 31)	80	2	(The Football Association) Tottenham Hotspur
12	DF	Laura Wienroither	13 January 1999 (aged 23)	23	1	(The Football Association) Arsenal
13	DF	Virginia Kirchberger	25 May 1993 (aged 29)	88	2	(German Football Association) Eintracht Frankfurt
14	MF	Marie-Therese Höbinger	1 July 2001 (aged 21)	19	5	(Swiss Football Association) FC Zürich
15	FW	Nicole Billa	5 March 1996 (aged 26)	79	43	(German Football Association) 1899 Hoffenheim
16	MF	Jasmin Eder	8 October 1992 (aged 29)	55	1	(Austrian Football Association) St. Pölten
17	MF	Sarah Puntigam	13 October 1992 (aged 29)	120	18	(French Football Federation) Montpellier
18	MF	Julia Hickelsberger-Füller	1 August 1999 (aged 22)	17	5	(Austrian Football Association) St. Pölten
19	DF	Verena Hanshaw	20 January 1994 (aged 28)	85	10	(German Football Association) Eintracht Frankfurt
20	FW	Lisa Makas	11 May 1992 (aged 30)	71	19	(Austrian Football Association) Austria Wien
21	GK	Isabella Kresche	28 November 1998 (aged 23)	2	0	(Austrian Football Association) St. Pölten
22	FW	Stefanie Enzinger	25 November 1990 (aged 31)	30	6	(Austrian Football Association) St. Pölten
23	GK	Jasmin Pal	24 August 1996 (aged 25)	2	0	(German Football Association) SC Sand

=== England ===
A provisional 28-player squad was announced on 17 May 2022. The final squad was announced on 15 June 2022.

Head coach: (Netherlands) Sarina Wiegman

No.	Pos.	Player	Date of birth (age)	Caps	Goals	Club
1	GK	Mary Earps	7 March 1993 (aged 29)	19	0	(The Football Association) Manchester United
2	DF	Lucy Bronze	28 October 1991 (aged 30)	90	10	(The Football Association) Manchester City
3	DF	Rachel Daly	6 December 1991 (aged 30)	51	8	(United States Soccer Federation) Houston Dash
4	MF	Keira Walsh	8 April 1997 (aged 25)	42	0	(The Football Association) Manchester City
5	DF	Alex Greenwood	7 September 1993 (aged 28)	61	5	(The Football Association) Manchester City
6	DF	Millie Bright	21 August 1993 (aged 28)	52	5	(The Football Association) Chelsea
7	FW	Beth Mead	9 May 1995 (aged 27)	39	22	(The Football Association) Arsenal
8	MF	Leah Williamson (captain)	29 March 1997 (aged 25)	31	2	(The Football Association) Arsenal
9	FW	Ellen White	9 May 1989 (aged 33)	107	50	(The Football Association) Manchester City
10	MF	Georgia Stanway	3 January 1999 (aged 23)	34	9	(The Football Association) Manchester City
11	FW	Lauren Hemp	7 August 2000 (aged 21)	22	7	(The Football Association) Manchester City
12	DF	Jess Carter	17 October 1997 (aged 24)	10	1	(The Football Association) Chelsea
13	GK	Hannah Hampton	16 November 2000 (aged 21)	2	0	(The Football Association) Aston Villa
14	MF	Fran Kirby	29 June 1993 (aged 29)	57	15	(The Football Association) Chelsea
15	DF	Demi Stokes	12 December 1991 (aged 30)	67	1	(The Football Association) Manchester City
16	MF	Jill Scott	2 February 1987 (aged 35)	157	27	(The Football Association) Aston Villa
17	FW	Nikita Parris	10 March 1994 (aged 28)	65	15	(The Football Association) Arsenal
18	FW	Chloe Kelly	15 January 1998 (aged 24)	10	1	(The Football Association) Manchester City
19	FW	Bethany England	3 June 1994 (aged 28)	19	9	(The Football Association) Chelsea
20	MF	Ella Toone	2 September 1999 (aged 22)	15	11	(The Football Association) Manchester United
21	GK	Ellie Roebuck	23 September 1999 (aged 22)	8	0	(The Football Association) Manchester City
22	DF	Lotte Wubben-Moy	11 January 1999 (aged 23)	8	0	(The Football Association) Arsenal
23	FW	Alessia Russo	8 February 1999 (aged 23)	7	4	(The Football Association) Manchester United

=== Northern Ireland ===
The squad was announced on 27 June 2022.

Head coach: Kenny Shiels

No.	Pos.	Player	Date of birth (age)	Caps	Goals	Club
1	GK	Jackie Burns	6 March 1997 (aged 25)	39	0	(Swedish Football Association) BK Häcken
2	DF	Rebecca McKenna	13 April 2001 (aged 21)	20	1	(The Football Association) Lewes
3	DF	Demi Vance	2 May 1991 (aged 31)	75	4	(Scottish Football Association) Rangers
4	DF	Sarah McFadden	23 May 1987 (aged 35)	86	6	(The Football Association) Durham
5	DF	Julie Nelson	4 June 1985 (aged 37)	125	8	(Irish Football Association) Crusaders Strikers
6	DF	Ashley Hutton	2 November 1987 (aged 34)	114	9	(Irish Football Association) Linfield
7	MF	Chloe McCarron	22 December 1997 (aged 24)	23	1	(Irish Football Association) Glentoran
8	MF	Marissa Callaghan (captain)	2 September 1985 (aged 36)	72	9	(Irish Football Association) Cliftonville
9	FW	Simone Magill	1 November 1994 (aged 27)	70	21	(The Football Association) Everton
10	MF	Rachel Furness	19 June 1988 (aged 34)	85	38	(The Football Association) Liverpool
11	FW	Kirsty McGuinness	4 November 1994 (aged 27)	57	14	(Irish Football Association) Cliftonville
12	GK	Becky Flaherty	6 March 1998 (aged 24)	7	0	(The Football Association) Brighouse Town
13	DF	Kelsie Burrows	22 February 2001 (aged 21)	8	0	(Irish Football Association) Cliftonville
14	FW	Lauren Wade	22 November 1993 (aged 28)	41	7	(Irish Football Association) Glentoran
15	DF	Rebecca Holloway	25 August 1995 (aged 26)	9	3	(United States Soccer Federation) Racing Louisville
16	MF	Nadene Caldwell	24 January 1991 (aged 31)	67	2	(Irish Football Association) Glentoran
17	DF	Laura Rafferty	29 April 1996 (aged 26)	32	0	(The Football Association) Southampton
18	MF	Louise McDaniel	24 May 2000 (aged 22)	8	1	(Irish Football Association) Cliftonville
19	FW	Emily Wilson	26 August 2001 (aged 20)	11	1	(Irish Football Association) Crusaders Strikers
20	MF	Joely Andrews	20 April 2002 (aged 20)	7	1	(Irish Football Association) Glentoran
21	FW	Caitlin McGuinness	30 August 2002 (aged 19)	11	1	(Irish Football Association) Cliftonville
22	DF	Abbie Magee	15 November 2000 (aged 21)	6	0	(Irish Football Association) Cliftonville
23	GK	Shannon Turner	8 September 1997 (aged 24)	0	0	(The Football Association) Wolverhampton Wanderers

=== Norway ===
The squad was announced on 7 June 2022. On 26 June, Thea Bjelde replaced Lisa Naalsund, who withdrew following a leg injury suffered in a friendly against New Zealand.

Head coach: (Sweden) Martin Sjögren

No.	Pos.	Player	Date of birth (age)	Caps	Goals	Club
1	GK	Guro Pettersen	22 August 1991 (aged 30)	3	0	(Norwegian Football Federation) Vålerenga
2	DF	Anja Sønstevold	21 June 1992 (aged 30)	21	1	(Italian Football Federation) Inter Milan
3	DF	Maria Thorisdottir	5 June 1993 (aged 29)	61	3	(The Football Association) Manchester United
4	DF	Tuva Hansen	4 August 1997 (aged 24)	16	0	(Norwegian Football Federation) Brann
5	DF	Guro Bergsvand	3 March 1994 (aged 28)	12	4	(Norwegian Football Federation) Brann
6	DF	Maren Mjelde (captain)	6 November 1989 (aged 32)	153	19	(The Football Association) Chelsea
7	MF	Ingrid Syrstad Engen	29 April 1998 (aged 24)	48	6	(Royal Spanish Football Federation) Barcelona
8	MF	Vilde Bøe Risa	13 July 1995 (aged 26)	50	2	(The Football Association) Manchester United
9	MF	Karina Sævik	24 March 1996 (aged 26)	31	4	(Norwegian Football Federation) Avaldsnes
10	FW	Caroline Graham Hansen	18 February 1995 (aged 27)	95	43	(Royal Spanish Football Federation) Barcelona
11	FW	Guro Reiten	26 July 1994 (aged 27)	66	16	(The Football Association) Chelsea
12	GK	Sunniva Skoglund	7 July 2002 (aged 19)	0	0	(Norwegian Football Federation) Stabæk
13	FW	Celin Bizet Ildhusøy	23 October 2001 (aged 20)	6	4	(French Football Federation) Paris Saint-Germain
14	FW	Ada Hegerberg	10 July 1995 (aged 26)	70	42	(French Football Federation) Lyon
15	MF	Amalie Eikeland	26 August 1995 (aged 26)	33	3	(The Football Association) Reading
16	MF	Thea Bjelde	5 June 2000 (aged 22)	0	0	(Norwegian Football Federation) Vålerenga
17	DF	Julie Blakstad	27 August 2001 (aged 20)	15	2	(The Football Association) Manchester City
18	MF	Frida Maanum	16 July 1999 (aged 22)	51	7	(The Football Association) Arsenal
19	MF	Elisabeth Terland	28 June 2001 (aged 21)	16	6	(Norwegian Football Federation) Brann
20	MF	Synne Skinnes Hansen	12 August 1995 (aged 26)	27	0	(Norwegian Football Federation) Rosenborg
21	DF	Anna Jøsendal	29 April 2001 (aged 21)	2	0	(Norwegian Football Federation) Rosenborg
22	FW	Sophie Roman Haug	4 June 1999 (aged 23)	1	0	(Italian Football Federation) Roma
23	GK	Aurora Mikalsen	21 March 1996 (aged 26)	1	0	(Norwegian Football Federation) Brann

== Group B ==
=== Denmark ===
The squad was announced on 16 June 2022.

Head coach: Lars Søndergaard

No.	Pos.	Player	Date of birth (age)	Caps	Goals	Club
1	GK	Lene Christensen	4 February 2000 (aged 22)	13	0	(Norwegian Football Federation) Rosenborg
2	MF	Sara Thrige	15 May 1996 (aged 26)	23	2	(Italian Football Federation) Milan
3	DF	Stine Ballisager	3 January 1994 (aged 28)	31	2	(Norwegian Football Federation) Vålerenga
4	DF	Rikke Sevecke	15 June 1996 (aged 26)	38	4	(The Football Association) Everton
5	DF	Simone Boye	3 March 1992 (aged 30)	72	5	(The Football Association) Arsenal
6	MF	Karen Holmgaard	28 January 1999 (aged 23)	17	1	(German Football Association) Turbine Potsdam
7	MF	Sanne Troelsgaard	15 August 1988 (aged 33)	166	55	(The Football Association) Reading
8	MF	Sara Holmgaard	28 January 1999 (aged 23)	7	0	(German Football Association) Turbine Potsdam
9	FW	Nadia Nadim	2 January 1988 (aged 34)	100	38	(United States Soccer Federation) Racing Louisville
10	FW	Pernille Harder (captain)	15 November 1992 (aged 29)	134	68	(The Football Association) Chelsea
11	DF	Katrine Veje	19 June 1991 (aged 31)	137	9	(Swedish Football Association) Rosengård
12	FW	Stine Larsen	24 January 1996 (aged 26)	63	21	(Swedish Football Association) BK Häcken
13	MF	Sofie Junge Pedersen	24 April 1992 (aged 30)	79	7	(Italian Football Federation) Juventus
14	MF	Sofie Bredgaard	18 January 2002 (aged 20)	2	0	(Swedish Football Association) Rosengård
15	MF	Kathrine Kühl	5 July 2003 (aged 19)	15	1	(Danish Football Association) FC Nordsjælland
16	GK	Katrine Svane	17 March 1998 (aged 24)	1	0	(Danish Football Association) AGF
17	FW	Rikke Madsen	9 August 1997 (aged 24)	18	1	(Royal Spanish Football Federation) Madrid CFF
18	DF	Luna Gevitz	3 March 1994 (aged 28)	16	0	(Swedish Football Association) BK Häcken
19	MF	Janni Thomsen	16 February 2000 (aged 22)	15	3	(Norwegian Football Federation) Vålerenga
20	FW	Signe Bruun	6 April 1998 (aged 24)	23	15	(The Football Association) Manchester United
21	FW	Mille Gejl	23 September 1999 (aged 22)	19	7	(Swedish Football Association) BK Häcken
22	GK	Laura Worsøe	28 October 2001 (aged 20)	1	0	(Danish Football Association) Odense Q
23	MF	Sofie Svava	11 August 2000 (aged 21)	29	2	(Royal Spanish Football Federation) Real Madrid

=== Finland ===
The squad was announced on 9 June 2022.

Head coach: (Sweden) Anna Signeul

No.	Pos.	Player	Date of birth (age)	Caps	Goals	Club
1	GK	Katriina Talaslahti	21 September 2000 (aged 21)	1	0	(French Football Federation) FC Fleury 91
2	DF	Elli Pikkujämsä	24 October 1999 (aged 22)	15	0	(Swedish Football Association) KIF Örebro DFF
3	DF	Tuija Hyyrynen	10 March 1988 (aged 34)	120	3	(Italian Football Federation) Juventus
4	MF	Ria Öling	15 September 1994 (aged 27)	59	9	(Swedish Football Association) Rosengård
5	DF	Emma Koivisto	25 September 1994 (aged 27)	75	3	(The Football Association) Brighton & Hove Albion
6	DF	Anna Auvinen	2 March 1987 (aged 35)	19	0	(Italian Football Federation) Sampdoria
7	FW	Adelina Engman	11 October 1994 (aged 27)	83	12	(Swedish Football Association) Hammarby
8	MF	Olga Ahtinen	15 August 1997 (aged 24)	43	3	(Swedish Football Association) Linköpings FC
9	MF	Juliette Kemppi	14 May 1994 (aged 28)	63	5	(Swedish Football Association) IFK Kalmar
10	MF	Emmi Alanen	30 April 1991 (aged 31)	94	21	(Swedish Football Association) Kristianstads DFF
11	DF	Nora Heroum	20 July 1994 (aged 27)	83	1	(Italian Football Federation) Lazio
12	GK	Anna Tamminen	30 October 1994 (aged 27)	6	0	(Swedish Football Association) Hammarby
13	MF	Jenny Danielsson	30 August 1994 (aged 27)	37	7	(Swedish Football Association) AIK
14	FW	Heidi Kollanen	6 June 1997 (aged 25)	18	2	(Swedish Football Association) KIF Örebro DFF
15	DF	Natalia Kuikka	1 December 1995 (aged 26)	68	3	(United States Soccer Federation) Portland Thorns
16	DF	Anna Westerlund	9 April 1989 (aged 33)	143	4	(Football Association of Finland) Åland United
17	FW	Sanni Franssi	19 March 1995 (aged 27)	58	3	(Royal Spanish Football Federation) Real Sociedad
18	FW	Linda Sällström	13 July 1988 (aged 33)	117	50	(Swedish Football Association) Vittsjö GIK
19	MF	Essi Sainio	9 September 1986 (aged 35)	55	3	(Football Association of Finland) HJK
20	MF	Eveliina Summanen	29 May 1998 (aged 24)	41	7	(The Football Association) Tottenham Hotspur
21	FW	Amanda Rantanen	11 May 1998 (aged 24)	11	1	(Swedish Football Association) KIF Örebro DFF
22	FW	Jutta Rantala	11 November 1999 (aged 22)	8	1	(Swedish Football Association) Vittsjö GIK
23	GK	Tinja-Riikka Korpela (captain)	5 May 1986 (aged 36)	107	0	(The Football Association) Tottenham Hotspur

=== Germany ===
A provisional 28-player squad was announced on 31 May 2022. The final squad was announced on 18 June 2022.

Head coach: Martina Voss-Tecklenburg

No.	Pos.	Player	Date of birth (age)	Caps	Goals	Club
1	GK	Merle Frohms	28 January 1995 (aged 27)	27	0	(German Football Association) Eintracht Frankfurt
2	DF	Sophia Kleinherne	12 April 2000 (aged 22)	16	0	(German Football Association) Eintracht Frankfurt
3	DF	Kathrin Hendrich	6 April 1992 (aged 30)	46	5	(German Football Association) VfL Wolfsburg
4	MF	Lena Lattwein	2 May 2000 (aged 22)	17	0	(German Football Association) VfL Wolfsburg
5	DF	Marina Hegering	17 April 1990 (aged 32)	20	3	(German Football Association) Bayern Munich
6	MF	Lena Oberdorf	19 December 2001 (aged 20)	27	3	(German Football Association) VfL Wolfsburg
7	FW	Lea Schüller	12 November 1997 (aged 24)	39	25	(German Football Association) Bayern Munich
8	MF	Sydney Lohmann	19 June 2000 (aged 22)	12	2	(German Football Association) Bayern Munich
9	MF	Svenja Huth	25 January 1991 (aged 31)	66	13	(German Football Association) VfL Wolfsburg
10	FW	Laura Freigang	1 February 1998 (aged 24)	13	9	(German Football Association) Eintracht Frankfurt
11	FW	Alexandra Popp (captain)	6 April 1991 (aged 31)	114	53	(German Football Association) VfL Wolfsburg
12	GK	Almuth Schult	9 February 1991 (aged 31)	64	0	(German Football Association) VfL Wolfsburg
13	MF	Sara Däbritz	15 February 1995 (aged 27)	86	17	(French Football Federation) Paris Saint-Germain
14	FW	Nicole Anyomi	10 February 2000 (aged 22)	8	0	(German Football Association) Eintracht Frankfurt
15	DF	Giulia Gwinn	2 July 1999 (aged 23)	27	3	(German Football Association) Bayern Munich
16	MF	Linda Dallmann	2 September 1994 (aged 27)	45	12	(German Football Association) Bayern Munich
17	DF	Felicitas Rauch	30 April 1996 (aged 26)	21	3	(German Football Association) VfL Wolfsburg
18	FW	Tabea Waßmuth	26 August 1996 (aged 25)	15	5	(German Football Association) VfL Wolfsburg
19	FW	Klara Bühl	7 December 2000 (aged 21)	24	12	(German Football Association) Bayern Munich
20	MF	Lina Magull	15 August 1994 (aged 27)	60	19	(German Football Association) Bayern Munich
21	GK	Ann-Katrin Berger	9 October 1990 (aged 31)	3	0	(The Football Association) Chelsea
22	MF	Jule Brand	16 October 2002 (aged 19)	16	5	(German Football Association) 1899 Hoffenheim
23	DF	Sara Doorsoun	17 November 1991 (aged 30)	36	1	(German Football Association) Eintracht Frankfurt

=== Spain ===
A provisional 28-player squad was announced on 31 May 2022. The final squad was announced on 27 June 2022. On 29 June, Teresa Abelleira replaced Salma Paralluelo who withdrew following a muscle injury. On 5 July, Amaiur Sarriegi replaced Alexia Putellas who withdrew following an ACL injury suffered in training.

Head coach: Jorge Vilda

No.	Pos.	Player	Date of birth (age)	Caps	Goals	Club
1	GK	Lola Gallardo	10 June 1993 (aged 29)	37	0	(Royal Spanish Football Federation) Atlético Madrid
2	DF	Ona Batlle	10 June 1999 (aged 23)	23	0	(The Football Association) Manchester United
3	DF	Laia Aleixandri	25 August 2000 (aged 21)	11	2	(Royal Spanish Football Federation) Atlético Madrid
4	DF	Irene Paredes (captain)	4 July 1991 (aged 31)	83	9	(Royal Spanish Football Federation) Barcelona
5	DF	Ivana Andrés	13 July 1994 (aged 27)	36	0	(Royal Spanish Football Federation) Real Madrid
6	MF	Aitana Bonmatí	18 January 1998 (aged 24)	42	15	(Royal Spanish Football Federation) Barcelona
7	MF	Irene Guerrero	12 December 1996 (aged 25)	14	4	(Royal Spanish Football Federation) Levante
8	MF	Mariona Caldentey	19 March 1996 (aged 26)	49	18	(Royal Spanish Football Federation) Barcelona
9	FW	Esther González	8 December 1992 (aged 29)	23	15	(Royal Spanish Football Federation) Real Madrid
10	MF	Athenea del Castillo	24 October 2000 (aged 21)	11	3	(Royal Spanish Football Federation) Real Madrid
11	MF	Marta Cardona	26 May 1995 (aged 27)	18	1	(Royal Spanish Football Federation) Real Madrid
12	MF	Patricia Guijarro	17 May 1998 (aged 24)	46	10	(Royal Spanish Football Federation) Barcelona
13	GK	Sandra Paños	4 November 1992 (aged 29)	52	0	(Royal Spanish Football Federation) Barcelona
14	FW	Amaiur Sarriegi	13 December 2000 (aged 21)	12	12	(Royal Spanish Football Federation) Real Sociedad
15	DF	Leila Ouahabi	22 March 1993 (aged 29)	49	1	(Royal Spanish Football Federation) Barcelona
16	DF	María Pilar León	13 June 1995 (aged 27)	50	1	(Royal Spanish Football Federation) Barcelona
17	FW	Lucía García	14 July 1998 (aged 23)	33	8	(Royal Spanish Football Federation) Athletic Club
18	MF	Teresa Abelleira	9 January 2000 (aged 22)	5	0	(Royal Spanish Football Federation) Real Madrid
19	DF	Olga Carmona	12 June 2000 (aged 22)	10	0	(Royal Spanish Football Federation) Real Madrid
20	DF	Andrea Pereira	19 September 1993 (aged 28)	41	0	(Royal Spanish Football Federation) Barcelona
21	MF	Sheila García	15 March 1997 (aged 25)	7	0	(Royal Spanish Football Federation) Atlético Madrid
22	FW	Clàudia Pina	12 August 2001 (aged 20)	4	0	(Royal Spanish Football Federation) Barcelona
23	GK	Misa Rodríguez	22 July 1999 (aged 22)	5	0	(Royal Spanish Football Federation) Real Madrid

== Group C ==
=== Netherlands ===
The squad was announced on 31 May 2022. On 11 July, Jacintha Weimar replaced Sari van Veenendaal who withdrew after first match vs Sweden following an injury.

Head coach: (England) Mark Parsons

No.	Pos.	Player	Date of birth (age)	Caps	Goals	Club
1	GK	Sari van Veenendaal (captain; until 11 July)	3 April 1990 (aged 32)	90	0	(Royal Dutch Football Association) PSV
1	GK	Jacintha Weimar (from 11 July)	11 June 1998 (aged 24)	0	0	(Royal Dutch Football Association) Feyenoord
2	DF	Aniek Nouwen	9 March 1999 (aged 23)	31	2	(The Football Association) Chelsea
3	DF	Stefanie van der Gragt	16 August 1992 (aged 29)	89	11	(Royal Dutch Football Association) Ajax
4	DF	Merel van Dongen	11 February 1993 (aged 29)	59	2	(Royal Spanish Football Federation) Atlético Madrid
5	DF	Lynn Wilms	3 October 2000 (aged 21)	21	1	(German Football Association) VfL Wolfsburg
6	MF	Jill Roord	22 April 1997 (aged 25)	77	19	(German Football Association) VfL Wolfsburg
7	FW	Lineth Beerensteyn	11 October 1996 (aged 25)	81	20	(German Football Association) Bayern Munich
8	MF	Sherida Spitse	29 May 1990 (aged 32)	202	43	(Royal Dutch Football Association) Ajax
9	FW	Vivianne Miedema	15 July 1996 (aged 25)	111	94	(The Football Association) Arsenal
10	MF	Daniëlle van de Donk	5 August 1991 (aged 30)	126	32	(French Football Federation) Lyon
11	FW	Lieke Martens	16 December 1992 (aged 29)	136	55	(Royal Spanish Football Federation) Barcelona
12	MF	Victoria Pelova	3 June 1999 (aged 23)	27	2	(Royal Dutch Football Association) Ajax
13	FW	Renate Jansen	7 December 1990 (aged 31)	51	4	(Royal Dutch Football Association) FC Twente
14	MF	Jackie Groenen	17 December 1994 (aged 27)	87	9	(The Football Association) Manchester United
15	DF	Caitlin Dijkstra	30 January 1999 (aged 23)	5	1	(Royal Dutch Football Association) FC Twente
16	GK	Daphne van Domselaar	6 March 2000 (aged 22)	1	0	(Royal Dutch Football Association) FC Twente
17	FW	Romée Leuchter	12 January 2001 (aged 21)	4	0	(Royal Dutch Football Association) Ajax
18	DF	Kerstin Casparij	19 August 2000 (aged 21)	10	0	(Royal Dutch Football Association) FC Twente
19	DF	Marisa Olislagers	9 September 2000 (aged 21)	7	0	(Royal Dutch Football Association) FC Twente
20	DF	Dominique Janssen	17 January 1995 (aged 27)	84	4	(German Football Association) VfL Wolfsburg
21	MF	Damaris Egurrola	26 August 1999 (aged 22)	5	2	(French Football Federation) Lyon
22	FW	Esmee Brugts	28 July 2003 (aged 18)	6	1	(Royal Dutch Football Association) PSV
23	GK	Barbara Lorsheyd	26 March 1991 (aged 31)	1	0	(Royal Dutch Football Association) ADO Den Haag

=== Portugal ===
The squad was announced on 30 May 2022. On 17 June, Lúcia Alves replaced Mariana Azevedo who withdrew following a knee ligament injury sustained in training. On 5 July, Suzane Pires replaced Andreia Jacinto who withdrew following an injury.

Head coach: Francisco Neto

No.	Pos.	Player	Date of birth (age)	Caps	Goals	Club
1	GK	Inês Pereira	26 May 1999 (aged 23)	28	0	(Swiss Football Association) Servette FCCF
2	DF	Catarina Amado	21 July 1999 (aged 22)	16	0	(Portuguese Football Federation) Benfica
3	DF	Alícia Correia	29 April 2003 (aged 19)	9	0	(Portuguese Football Federation) Sporting CP
4	DF	Sílvia Rebelo	20 May 1989 (aged 33)	117	1	(Portuguese Football Federation) Benfica
5	DF	Joana Marchão	24 October 1996 (aged 25)	27	0	(Portuguese Football Federation) Sporting CP
6	MF	Suzane Pires	17 August 1992 (aged 29)	26	0	(Brazilian Football Confederation) Ferroviária
7	MF	Vanessa Marques	12 April 1996 (aged 26)	82	10	(Portuguese Football Federation) Braga
8	MF	Andreia Norton	15 August 1996 (aged 25)	61	4	(Portuguese Football Federation) Braga
9	FW	Ana Borges	15 June 1990 (aged 32)	143	11	(Portuguese Football Federation) Sporting CP
10	FW	Jéssica Silva	11 December 1994 (aged 27)	88	10	(Portuguese Football Federation) Benfica
11	MF	Tatiana Pinto	28 March 1994 (aged 28)	86	2	(Royal Spanish Football Federation) Levante
12	GK	Patrícia Morais	17 June 1992 (aged 30)	75	0	(Portuguese Football Federation) Braga
13	MF	Fátima Pinto	16 January 1996 (aged 26)	68	2	(Portuguese Football Federation) Sporting CP
14	MF	Dolores Silva (captain)	7 August 1991 (aged 30)	135	15	(Portuguese Football Federation) Braga
15	DF	Carole Costa	3 May 1990 (aged 32)	141	15	(Portuguese Football Federation) Benfica
16	FW	Diana Silva	4 June 1995 (aged 27)	80	17	(Portuguese Football Federation) Sporting CP
17	DF	Lúcia Alves	22 October 1997 (aged 24)	4	0	(Portuguese Football Federation) Benfica
18	FW	Carolina Mendes	27 November 1987 (aged 34)	106	23	(Portuguese Football Federation) Braga
19	DF	Diana Gomes	26 July 1998 (aged 23)	21	3	(Portuguese Football Federation) Braga
20	MF	Francisca Nazareth	17 November 2002 (aged 19)	15	2	(Portuguese Football Federation) Benfica
21	MF	Andreia Faria	19 April 2000 (aged 22)	15	0	(Portuguese Football Federation) Benfica
22	GK	Rute Costa	1 June 1994 (aged 28)	6	0	(Portuguese Football Federation) Famalicão
23	FW	Telma Encarnação	11 October 2001 (aged 20)	14	3	(Portuguese Football Federation) Marítimo

=== Sweden ===
The squad was announced on 7 June 2022.

Head coach: Peter Gerhardsson

No.	Pos.	Player	Date of birth (age)	Caps	Goals	Club
1	GK	Hedvig Lindahl	29 April 1983 (aged 39)	184	0	(Royal Spanish Football Federation) Atlético Madrid
2	DF	Jonna Andersson	2 January 1993 (aged 29)	70	2	(The Football Association) Chelsea
3	DF	Linda Sembrant	15 May 1987 (aged 35)	128	15	(Italian Football Federation) Juventus
4	DF	Hanna Glas	16 April 1993 (aged 29)	54	1	(German Football Association) Bayern Munich
5	DF	Amanda Nildén	7 August 1998 (aged 23)	3	0	(Italian Football Federation) Juventus
6	DF	Magdalena Eriksson	8 September 1993 (aged 28)	84	10	(The Football Association) Chelsea
7	DF	Emma Kullberg	25 September 1991 (aged 30)	10	0	(The Football Association) Brighton & Hove Albion
8	FW	Lina Hurtig	5 September 1995 (age 30)	55	19	(Italian Football Federation) Juventus
9	MF	Kosovare Asllani	29 July 1989 (aged 32)	161	43	(Royal Spanish Football Federation) Real Madrid
10	FW	Sofia Jakobsson	23 April 1990 (age 35)	138	23	(United States Soccer Federation) San Diego Wave
11	FW	Stina Blackstenius	5 February 1996 (aged 26)	77	26	(The Football Association) Arsenal
12	GK	Jennifer Falk	26 April 1993 (aged 29)	13	0	(Swedish Football Association) BK Häcken
13	DF	Amanda Ilestedt	17 January 1993 (aged 29)	55	7	(French Football Federation) Paris Saint-Germain
14	DF	Nathalie Björn	4 May 1997 (aged 25)	37	4	(The Football Association) Everton
15	FW	Rebecka Blomqvist	24 July 1997 (age 28)	13	2	(German Football Association) VfL Wolfsburg
16	MF	Filippa Angeldahl	14 July 1997 (age 28)	28	8	(The Football Association) Manchester City
17	MF	Caroline Seger (captain)	19 March 1985 (aged 37)	230	32	(Swedish Football Association) Rosengård
18	FW	Fridolina Rolfö	24 November 1993 (aged 28)	65	22	(Royal Spanish Football Federation) Barcelona
19	FW	Johanna Rytting Kaneryd	12 February 1997 (age 28)	12	1	(Swedish Football Association) BK Häcken
20	MF	Hanna Bennison	16 October 2002 (aged 19)	22	0	(The Football Association) Everton
21	GK	Zećira Mušović	26 May 1996 (aged 26)	5	0	(The Football Association) Chelsea
22	FW	Olivia Schough	11 March 1991 (aged 31)	98	12	(Swedish Football Association) Rosengård
23	MF	Elin Rubensson	11 May 1993 (age 32)	71	3	(Swedish Football Association) BK Häcken

=== Switzerland ===
The squad was announced on 21 June 2022. On 27 June, Nadine Riesen replaced Ella Touon (not to be confused with England's Ella Toone), who withdrew following a high ankle sprain sustained in training.

Head coach: (Denmark) Nils Nielsen

No.	Pos.	Player	Date of birth (age)	Caps	Goals	Club
1	GK	Gaëlle Thalmann	18 January 1986 (aged 36)	96	0	(Royal Spanish Football Federation) Real Betis
2	DF	Julia Stierli	3 April 1997 (aged 25)	21	0	(Swiss Football Association) FC Zürich
3	DF	Lara Marti	21 September 1999 (aged 22)	10	0	(German Football Association) Bayer Leverkusen
4	DF	Rachel Rinast	2 June 1991 (aged 31)	44	3	(German Football Association) 1. FC Köln
5	DF	Noelle Maritz	23 December 1995 (aged 26)	93	2	(The Football Association) Arsenal
6	DF	Géraldine Reuteler	21 April 1999 (aged 23)	43	7	(German Football Association) Eintracht Frankfurt
7	MF	Riola Xhemaili	5 March 2003 (aged 19)	15	2	(German Football Association) SC Freiburg
8	MF	Sandy Maendly	4 April 1988 (aged 34)	86	12	(Swiss Football Association) Servette FCCF
9	FW	Ana-Maria Crnogorčević	3 October 1990 (aged 31)	135	67	(Royal Spanish Football Federation) Barcelona
10	FW	Ramona Bachmann	25 December 1990 (aged 31)	123	53	(French Football Federation) Paris Saint-Germain
11	MF	Coumba Sow	27 August 1994 (aged 27)	25	8	(French Football Federation) Paris FC
12	GK	Livia Peng	14 March 2002 (aged 20)	0	0	(Swiss Football Association) FC Zürich
13	MF	Lia Wälti (captain)	19 April 1993 (aged 29)	99	5	(The Football Association) Arsenal
14	DF	Rahel Kiwic	5 January 1991 (aged 31)	81	13	(Swiss Football Association) FC Zürich
15	DF	Luana Bühler	28 April 1996 (aged 26)	29	0	(German Football Association) 1899 Hoffenheim
16	MF	Sandrine Mauron	19 December 1996 (aged 25)	23	2	(German Football Association) Eintracht Frankfurt
17	FW	Svenja Fölmli	19 August 2002 (aged 19)	17	4	(German Football Association) SC Freiburg
18	DF	Viola Calligaris	17 March 1996 (aged 26)	33	3	(Royal Spanish Football Federation) Levante
19	FW	Eseosa Aigbogun	23 May 1993 (aged 29)	81	3	(French Football Federation) Paris FC
20	FW	Fabienne Humm	20 December 1986 (aged 35)	72	24	(Swiss Football Association) FC Zürich
21	GK	Seraina Friedli	20 March 1993 (aged 29)	10	0	(Swiss Football Association) FC Aarau
22	DF	Nadine Riesen	11 April 2000 (aged 22)	2	0	(Swiss Football Association) FC Zürich
23	FW	Meriame Terchoun	27 October 1995 (aged 26)	15	2	(Swiss Football Association) FC Zürich

== Group D ==
=== Belgium ===
A provisional 33-player squad was announced on 16 May 2022. The final squad was announced on 20 June 2022.

Head coach: Ives Serneels

No.	Pos.	Player	Date of birth (age)	Caps	Goals	Club
1	GK	Nicky Evrard	26 May 1995 (aged 27)	51	0	(Royal Belgian Football Association) Gent
2	DF	Davina Philtjens	26 February 1989 (aged 33)	108	10	(Italian Football Federation) Sassuolo
3	FW	Ella Van Kerkhoven	20 November 1993 (aged 28)	18	9	(Royal Belgian Football Association) Anderlecht
4	DF	Amber Tysiak	26 January 2000 (aged 22)	16	5	(Royal Belgian Football Association) OH Leuven
5	FW	Sarah Wijnants	13 October 1999 (aged 22)	25	2	(Royal Belgian Football Association) Anderlecht
6	MF	Tine De Caigny	9 June 1997 (aged 25)	75	37	(German Football Association) 1899 Hoffenheim
7	FW	Hannah Eurlings	1 January 2003 (aged 19)	18	4	(Royal Belgian Football Association) OH Leuven
8	MF	Féli Delacauw	4 April 2002 (aged 20)	8	0	(Royal Belgian Football Association) Gent
9	FW	Tessa Wullaert (captain)	19 March 1993 (aged 29)	109	67	(Royal Belgian Football Association) Anderlecht
10	MF	Justine Vanhaevermaet	29 April 1992 (aged 30)	34	4	(The Football Association) Reading
11	MF	Janice Cayman	12 October 1988 (aged 33)	126	47	(French Football Federation) Lyon
12	GK	Diede Lemey	7 October 1996 (aged 25)	7	0	(Italian Football Federation) Sassuolo
13	FW	Elena Dhont	27 March 1998 (aged 24)	22	3	(Royal Dutch Football Association) FC Twente
14	FW	Davinia Vanmechelen	30 August 1999 (aged 22)	47	10	(Royal Belgian Football Association) Standard Liège
15	DF	Jody Vangheluwe	15 July 1997 (aged 24)	10	0	(Royal Belgian Football Association) Club YLA
16	MF	Marie Minnaert	5 May 1999 (aged 23)	26	3	(Royal Belgian Football Association) Club YLA
17	DF	Charlotte Tison	21 April 1998 (aged 24)	13	0	(Royal Belgian Football Association) Anderlecht
18	DF	Laura De Neve	9 October 1994 (aged 27)	55	2	(Royal Belgian Football Association) Anderlecht
19	DF	Sari Kees	17 February 2001 (aged 21)	7	0	(Royal Belgian Football Association) OH Leuven
20	MF	Julie Biesmans	4 May 1994 (aged 28)	92	3	(Royal Dutch Football Association) PSV
21	GK	Lisa Lichtfus	29 December 1999 (aged 22)	0	0	(French Football Federation) Dijon
22	DF	Laura Deloose	18 June 1993 (aged 29)	68	4	(Royal Belgian Football Association) Anderlecht
23	MF	Kassandra Missipo	3 February 1998 (aged 24)	40	0	(Royal Belgian Football Association) Anderlecht

=== France ===
The squad was announced on 30 May 2022.

Head coach: Corinne Diacre

No.	Pos.	Player	Date of birth (age)	Caps	Goals	Club
1	GK	Mylène Chavas	7 January 1998 (aged 24)	1	0	(French Football Federation) Bordeaux
2	MF	Ella Palis	24 March 1999 (aged 23)	8	0	(French Football Federation) Bordeaux
3	DF	Wendie Renard (captain)	20 July 1990 (aged 31)	131	33	(French Football Federation) Lyon
4	DF	Marion Torrent	17 April 1992 (aged 30)	46	1	(French Football Federation) Montpellier
5	DF	Aïssatou Tounkara	16 March 1995 (aged 27)	33	3	(Royal Spanish Football Federation) Atlético Madrid
6	MF	Sandie Toletti	13 July 1995 (aged 26)	29	2	(Royal Spanish Football Federation) Levante
7	DF	Sakina Karchaoui	26 January 1996 (aged 26)	47	0	(French Football Federation) Paris Saint-Germain
8	MF	Grace Geyoro	2 July 1997 (aged 25)	49	8	(French Football Federation) Paris Saint-Germain
9	FW	Marie-Antoinette Katoto	1 November 1998 (aged 23)	30	25	(French Football Federation) Paris Saint-Germain
10	FW	Clara Matéo	28 November 1997 (aged 24)	12	2	(French Football Federation) Paris FC
11	FW	Kadidiatou Diani	1 April 1995 (aged 27)	71	18	(French Football Federation) Paris Saint-Germain
12	FW	Melvine Malard	28 June 2000 (aged 22)	13	4	(French Football Federation) Lyon
13	DF	Selma Bacha	9 November 2000 (aged 21)	6	1	(French Football Federation) Lyon
14	MF	Charlotte Bilbault	5 June 1990 (aged 32)	45	1	(French Football Federation) Bordeaux
15	MF	Kenza Dali	31 July 1991 (aged 30)	44	9	(The Football Association) Everton
16	GK	Justine Lerond	29 February 2000 (aged 22)	0	0	(French Football Federation) Metz
17	FW	Sandy Baltimore	19 February 2000 (aged 22)	15	2	(French Football Federation) Paris Saint-Germain
18	FW	Ouleymata Sarr	8 October 1995 (aged 26)	17	5	(French Football Federation) Paris FC
19	DF	Griedge Mbock Bathy	26 February 1995 (aged 27)	67	7	(French Football Federation) Lyon
20	FW	Delphine Cascarino	5 February 1997 (aged 25)	42	10	(French Football Federation) Lyon
21	GK	Pauline Peyraud-Magnin	17 March 1992 (aged 30)	26	0	(Italian Football Federation) Juventus
22	DF	Ève Périsset	24 December 1994 (aged 27)	36	3	(French Football Federation) Bordeaux
23	DF	Hawa Cissoko	10 April 1997 (aged 25)	6	0	(The Football Association) West Ham United

=== Iceland ===
The squad was announced on 11 June 2022. On 9 July, Auður Sveinbjörnsdóttir Scheving replaced Cecilía Rán Rúnarsdóttir, who withdrew following a finger injury suffered in training. On 14 July, Íris Dögg Gunnarsdóttir replaced Telma Ívarsdóttir, who suffered an injury in training the previous day.

Head coach: Þorsteinn Halldórsson

No.	Pos.	Player	Date of birth (age)	Caps	Goals	Club
1	GK	Sandra Sigurðardóttir	2 October 1986 (aged 35)	42	0	(Football Association of Iceland) Valur
2	DF	Sif Atladóttir	15 July 1985 (aged 36)	89	0	(Football Association of Iceland) Selfoss
3	DF	Elísa Viðarsdóttir	26 May 1991 (aged 31)	47	0	(Football Association of Iceland) Valur
4	DF	Glódís Perla Viggósdóttir	27 June 1995 (aged 27)	102	6	(German Football Association) Bayern Munich
5	MF	Gunnhildur Yrsa Jónsdóttir	28 September 1988 (aged 33)	90	14	(United States Soccer Federation) Orlando Pride
6	DF	Ingibjörg Sigurðardóttir	7 October 1997 (aged 24)	45	0	(Norwegian Football Federation) Vålerenga
7	MF	Sara Björk Gunnarsdóttir (captain)	29 September 1990 (aged 31)	139	22	(French Football Federation) Lyon
8	FW	Karólína Lea Vilhjálmsdóttir	8 August 2001 (aged 20)	19	7	(German Football Association) Bayern Munich
9	FW	Berglind Björg Þorvaldsdóttir	18 January 1992 (aged 30)	63	11	(Norwegian Football Federation) Brann
10	MF	Dagný Brynjarsdóttir	10 August 1991 (aged 30)	102	34	(The Football Association) West Ham United
11	DF	Hallbera Guðný Gísladóttir	14 September 1986 (aged 35)	128	3	(Swedish Football Association) IFK Kalmar
12	GK	Telma Ívarsdóttir (until 14 July)	30 March 1999 (aged 23)	1	0	(Football Association of Iceland) Breiðablik
12	GK	Íris Dögg Gunnarsdóttir (from 14 July)	18 September 1989 (aged 32)	0	0	(Football Association of Iceland) Þróttur Reykjavík
13	GK	Auður Sveinbjörnsdóttir Scheving	12 August 2002 (aged 19)	1	0	(Football Association of Iceland) UMF Afturelding
14	MF	Selma Sól Magnúsdóttir	23 April 1998 (aged 24)	17	2	(Norwegian Football Federation) Rosenborg
15	MF	Alexandra Jóhannsdóttir	19 March 2000 (aged 22)	24	3	(German Football Association) Eintracht Frankfurt
16	FW	Elín Metta Jensen	1 March 1995 (aged 27)	59	16	(Football Association of Iceland) Valur
17	MF	Agla María Albertsdóttir	5 August 1999 (aged 22)	47	4	(Swedish Football Association) BK Häcken
18	DF	Guðrún Arnardóttir	29 July 1995 (aged 26)	19	1	(Swedish Football Association) Rosengård
19	DF	Áslaug Munda Gunnlaugsdóttir	2 June 2001 (aged 21)	6	0	(Football Association of Iceland) Breiðablik
20	DF	Guðný Árnadóttir	29 July 2000 (aged 21)	15	0	(Italian Football Federation) Milan
21	FW	Svava Rós Guðmundsdóttir	11 November 1995 (aged 26)	36	2	(Norwegian Football Federation) Brann
22	MF	Amanda Andradóttir	18 December 2003 (aged 18)	6	0	(Swedish Football Association) Kristianstads DFF
23	FW	Sveindís Jane Jónsdóttir	5 June 2001 (aged 21)	19	7	(German Football Association) VfL Wolfsburg

=== Italy ===
The squad was announced on 26 June 2022.

Head coach: Milena Bertolini

No.	Pos.	Player	Date of birth (age)	Caps	Goals	Club
1	GK	Laura Giuliani	6 June 1993 (aged 29)	67	0	(Italian Football Federation) Milan
2	MF	Valentina Bergamaschi	22 January 1997 (aged 25)	44	7	(Italian Football Federation) Milan
3	DF	Sara Gama (captain)	27 March 1989 (aged 33)	130	7	(Italian Football Federation) Juventus
4	MF	Aurora Galli	13 December 1996 (aged 25)	56	6	(The Football Association) Everton
5	DF	Elena Linari	15 April 1994 (aged 28)	78	4	(Italian Football Federation) Roma
6	MF	Manuela Giugliano	18 August 1997 (aged 24)	56	6	(Italian Football Federation) Roma
7	MF	Flaminia Simonetti	17 February 1997 (aged 25)	3	0	(Italian Football Federation) Inter Milan
8	MF	Martina Rosucci	9 May 1992 (aged 30)	70	4	(Italian Football Federation) Juventus
9	FW	Daniela Sabatino	26 June 1985 (aged 37)	68	32	(Italian Football Federation) Fiorentina
10	FW	Cristiana Girelli	23 April 1990 (aged 32)	89	53	(Italian Football Federation) Juventus
11	FW	Barbara Bonansea	13 June 1991 (aged 31)	81	30	(Italian Football Federation) Juventus
12	GK	Katja Schroffenegger	28 April 1991 (aged 31)	15	0	(Italian Football Federation) Fiorentina
13	DF	Elisa Bartoli	7 May 1991 (aged 31)	78	3	(Italian Football Federation) Roma
14	FW	Agnese Bonfantini	4 July 1999 (aged 23)	7	0	(Italian Football Federation) Juventus
15	DF	Maria Luisa Filangeri	28 January 2000 (aged 22)	2	0	(Italian Football Federation) Sassuolo
16	DF	Lucia Di Guglielmo	26 June 1997 (aged 25)	6	0	(Italian Football Federation) Roma
17	DF	Lisa Boattin	3 May 1997 (aged 25)	38	0	(Italian Football Federation) Juventus
18	MF	Arianna Caruso	6 November 1999 (aged 22)	20	6	(Italian Football Federation) Juventus
19	FW	Valentina Giacinti	2 January 1994 (aged 28)	50	18	(Italian Football Federation) Milan
20	FW	Martina Piemonte	7 November 1997 (aged 24)	7	1	(Italian Football Federation) Milan
21	MF	Valentina Cernoia	22 June 1991 (aged 31)	71	14	(Italian Football Federation) Juventus
22	GK	Francesca Durante	12 February 1997 (aged 25)	3	0	(Italian Football Federation) Inter Milan
23	DF	Martina Lenzini	23 July 1998 (aged 23)	12	0	(Italian Football Federation) Juventus

== Player representation ==
=== Players ===
- Oldest (goalkeeper): (Sweden) Hedvig Lindahl (39 years, 68 days)
- Oldest (outfield): (Sweden) Caroline Seger (37 years, 109 days)
- Youngest (goalkeeper): (Iceland) Cecilía Rán Rúnarsdóttir (18 years, 345 days)
- Youngest (outfield): (Iceland) Amanda Andradóttir (18 years, 200 days)

=== By club ===
Clubs with 3 or more players represented are listed.

Players	Club
15	(Italy) Juventus
14	(Spain) Barcelona
13	(Germany) Bayern Munich, (Germany) VfL Wolfsburg
12	(England) Arsenal, (England) Chelsea, (Germany) Eintracht Frankfurt
11	(England) Manchester City
10	(France) Lyon
9	(France) Paris Saint-Germain, (Spain) Real Madrid
8	(England) Manchester United, (Sweden) BK Häcken
7	(Portugal) Benfica, (Switzerland) FC Zürich
6	(Belgium) Anderlecht, (England) Everton, (Germany) 1899 Hoffenheim, (Italy) Milan, (Italy) Roma, (Netherlands) FC Twente, (Northern Ireland) Cliftonville, (Norway) Brann, (Portugal) Braga, (Spain) Atlético Madrid, (Sweden) Rosengård
5	(Norway) Vålerenga, (Portugal) Sporting CP
4	(France) Bordeaux, (France) Paris FC, (Germany) 1. FC Köln, (Netherlands) Ajax, (Northern Ireland) Glentoran, (Norway) Rosenborg, (Spain) Levante
3	(Austria) St. Pölten, (Belgium) OH Leuven, (England) Reading, (England) Tottenham Hotspur, (Iceland) Valur, (Italy) Inter Milan, (Italy) Sassuolo, (Netherlands) PSV, (Sweden) KIF Örebro DFF

=== By club nationality ===
Country	Total players	Outside national squad
England	67	45
Germany	55	34
Spain	38	16
Italy	37	15
France	31	13
Sweden	27	22
Portugal	20	0
Norway	17	10
Netherlands	14	2
Belgium	14	0
Northern Ireland	13	0
Switzerland	11	3
Iceland	6	0
United States	6	6
Austria	5	0
Denmark	3	0
Finland	2	0
Brazil	1	1
Scotland	1	1

=== By club federation ===
Federation	Players
UEFA	361
CONCACAF	6
CONMEBOL	1
