= Swiss Golden Player Awards =

The Swiss Golden Player Award was established in 2006 by the two players’ organisations in Swiss professional football (SAFP) and ice hockey (SAIP).

The concept is unique: professional players vote for the best players in their league. The award recognises not only the best player of a season, but also performance over an entire calendar year. In addition, awards are given by position, including goalkeeper, defender, midfielder, forward, and young player.

The award is considered one of the most important individual honours in Swiss professional sport.

== Categories ==
- Best Player (Swiss Golden Player)
- Best Goalkeeper
- Best Defender
- Best Midfielder
- Best Forward
- Best Young Player
- Best Challenge League Player (depending on season)

== SAFP Golden 11 2025-2026 ==
Golden 11 Super League
Position	Player	Club
Golden Player	(Switzerland) Leonardo Bertone	FC Thun
GK	(Switzerland) Anthony Racioppi	FC Sion
DF	(Austria) Flavius Daniliuc	FC Basel 1893
DF	(Germany) Antonios Papadopoulos	FC Lugano
DF	(Croatia) Jozo Stanić	FC St. Gallen 1879
MF	(Switzerland) Leonardo Bertone	FC Thun
MF	(Switzerland) Matteo Di Giusto	FC Luzern
MF	(Switzerland) Anto Grgić	FC Lugano
MF	(Switzerland) Alvyn Sanches	BSC Young Boys
FW	(Ivory Coast) Chris Bedia	BSC Young Boys
FW	(Switzerland) Elmin Rastoder	FC Thun
FW	(Switzerland) Alessandro Vogt	FC St. Gallen 1879

Golden 11 Challenge League
Position	Player	Club
Golden Player	(Kosovo) Valon Fazliu	FC Aarau
GK	(Algeria) Melvin Mastil	FC Stade Nyonnais
DF	(Kosovo) Liridon Berisha	FC Vaduz
DF	(Switzerland) Serge Müller	FC Aarau
DF	(Switzerland) Anthony Sauthier	Yverdon Sport FC
MF	(Cape Verde) Ronaldo Dantas Fernandes	FC Vaduz
MF	(Kosovo) Valon Fazliu	FC Aarau
MF	(Switzerland) Stephan Seiler	FC Vaduz
MF	(Kosovo) Nassim Zoukit	FC Aarau
FW	(Guinea) Keasse Bah	FC Stade-Lausanne-Ouchy
FW	(Kosovo) Shkelqim Demhasaj	Neuchâtel Xamax FCS
FW	(Switzerland) Elias Filet	FC Aarau

== SAFP Golden 11 2024-2025 ==
Golden 11 Super League
Position	Player	Club
Golden Player	(Switzerland) Alvyn Sanches	FC Lausanne-Sport
GK	(Switzerland) Marvin Keller	BSC Young Boys
DF	(Italy) Mattia Zanotti	FC Lugano
DF	(Switzerland) Steve Rouiller	Servette FC
DF	(Algeria) Jaouen Hadjam	BSC Young Boys
MF	(Switzerland) Xherdan Shaqiri	FC Basel
MF	(Switzerland) Filip Ugrinić	BSC Young Boys
MF	(Switzerland) Timothé Cognat	Servette FC
MF	(Switzerland) Alvyn Sanches	FC Lausanne-Sport
FW	(Switzerland) Dereck Kutesa	Servette FC
FW	(Spain) Kevin Carlos	FC Basel / Yverdon Sport FC
FW	(Montenegro) Miroslav Stevanović	Servette FC

Golden 11 Challenge League
Position	Player	Club
Golden Player	(North Macedonia) Nikola Gjorgjev	FC Aarau
GK	(Switzerland) Marvin Hübel	FC Aarau
DF	(Switzerland) Michael Heule	FC Stade Lausanne-Ouchy
DF	(Switzerland) Genís Montolio	FC Thun
DF	(Switzerland) Vincent Rüfli	Étoile Carouge FC
MF	(Switzerland) Bruno Caslei	Étoile Carouge FC
MF	(Switzerland) Valon Fazliu	FC Aarau
MF	(Switzerland) Nico Maier	FC Wil 1900
MF	(North Macedonia) Nikola Gjorgjev	FC Aarau
FW	(Switzerland) Oscar Correia	Étoile Carouge FC
FW	(Switzerland) Elias Pasche	FC Stade Nyonnais
FW	(North Macedonia) Fabrizio Cavegn	FC Vaduz

== SAFP Golden 11 2023-2024 ==
Golden 11 Super League
Position	Player	Club
Golden Player	(Switzerland) Filip Ugrinic	BSC Young Boys
GK	(Switzerland) David von Ballmoos	BSC Young Boys
DF	(Japan) Keigo Tsunemoto	Servette FC
DF	(Switzerland) Steve Rouiller	Servette FC
DF	(Switzerland) Aurèle Amenda	BSC Young Boys
DF	(Switzerland) Lewin Blum	BSC Young Boys
MF	(Switzerland) Filip Ugrinic	BSC Young Boys
MF	(Switzerland) Ardon Jashari	FC Luzern
MF	(Switzerland) Timothé Cognat	Servette FC
FW	(Switzerland) Dereck Kutesa	Servette FC
FW	(Slovenia) Zan Celar	FC Lugano
FW	(Switzerland) Renato Steffen	FC Lugano

Golden 11 Challenge League
Position	Player	Club
Golden Player	(Portugal) Daniel dos Santos	FC Aarau
GK	(Switzerland) Mateo Matic	FC Thun
DF	(Switzerland) Reto Ziegler	FC Sion
DF	(Switzerland) Joël Schmied	FC Sion
DF	(Switzerland) Nicola Sutter	FC Vaduz
DF	(Switzerland) Numa Lavanchy	FC Sion
MF	(Switzerland) Kenan Fatkic	FC Thun
MF	(Switzerland) Ali Kabacalman	FC Sion
MF	(Switzerland) Kevin Bua	FC Sion
FW	(Switzerland) Valon Fazliu	FC Wil
FW	(Switzerland) Dejan Sorgic	FC Thun
FW	(Portugal) Daniel dos Santos	FC Aarau

== SAFP Golden 11 2022-2023 ==
Golden 11 Super League
Position	Player	Club
Golden Player	(Switzerland) Zeki Amdouni	FC Basel
GK	(Ghana) Lawrence Ati Zigi	FC St. Gallen
DF	(Switzerland) Lewin Blum	BSC Young Boys
DF	(Switzerland) Ulisses Garcia	BSC Young Boys
DF	(Switzerland) Leonidas Stergiou	FC St. Gallen
DF	(Switzerland) Cédric Zesiger	BSC Young Boys
MF	(France) Andy Diouf	FC Basel
MF	(Ivory Coast) Ousmane Doumbia	FC Lugano
MF	(Switzerland) Fabian Rieder	BSC Young Boys
MF	(Bosnia and Herzegovina) Miroslav Stevanovic	Servette FC
FW	(Switzerland) Zeki Amdouni	FC Basel
FW	(Switzerland) Cedric Itten	BSC Young Boys

Golden 11 Challenge League
Position	Player	Club
Golden Player	(France) Brighton Labeau	
GK	(Switzerland) Mateo Matic	FC Thun
DF	(United Kingdom) Archie Brown	FC Lausanne-Sport
DF	(Switzerland) Raoul Giger	FC Lausanne-Sport
DF	(Switzerland) William Le Pogam	Yverdon Sport FC
DF	(Albania) Genís Montolio	FC Wil
MF	(Switzerland) Olivier Custodio	FC Lausanne-Sport
MF	(Switzerland) Valon Fazliu	FC Aarau
MF	(Ivory Coast) Teddy Okou	FC Stade Lausanne-Ouchy
MF	(Angola) Alvyn Sanches	FC Lausanne-Sport
FW	(France) Brighton Labeau	FC Lausanne-Sport
FW	(Switzerland) Shkelqim Vladi	FC Aarau

== SAFP Golden 11 2021 ==
Golden 11 Super League
Position	Player	Club
GK	(Austria) Heinz Lindner	FC Basel
DF	(Switzerland) Ulisses Garcia	BSC Young Boys
DF	(France) Gaël Clichy	Servette FC
DF	(Switzerland) Becir Omeragic	FC Zürich
DF	(Switzerland) Silvan Hefti	BSC Young Boys
MF	(Bosnia and Herzegovina) Miroslav Stevanović	Servette FC
MF	(Switzerland) Christian Fassnacht	BSC Young Boys
MF	(Switzerland) Michel Aebischer	BSC Young Boys
MF	(Switzerland) Antonio Marchesano	FC Zürich
FW	(Democratic Republic of the Congo) Meschak Elia	BSC Young Boys
FW	(Brazil) Arthur Cabral	FC Basel

Golden 11 Challenge League
Position	Player	Club
GK	(Switzerland) Mateo Matic	Grasshopper Club Zürich
DF	(Portugal) Toti Gomes	Grasshopper Club Zürich
DF	(Kosovo) Liridon Berisha	Neuchâtel Xamax
DF	(Switzerland) Nicola Sutter	FC Thun
DF	(Kosovo) Granit Lekaj	FC Winterthur
MF	(Turkey) Tunahan Çiçek	FC Vaduz
MF	(Switzerland) Dominik Schmid	Grasshopper Club Zürich
MF	(Switzerland) Petar Pusic	Grasshopper Club Zürich
MF	(Albania) Liridon Balaj	FC Aarau
FW	(Switzerland) Kevin Spadanuda	FC Aarau
FW	(Switzerland) Roman Buess	FC Winterthur

== SAFP Golden 11 2020 ==
SAFP Golden 11 2020
Position	Player	Club
Goalkeeper	(Switzerland) David von Ballmoos	BSC Young Boys
Defender	(Switzerland) Silvan Hefti	BSC Young Boys
Defender	(Switzerland) Fabian Lustenberger	BSC Young Boys
Defender	(Switzerland) Eray Cömert	FC Basel
Defender	(Switzerland) Silvan Widmer	FC Basel
Midfielder	(Switzerland) Benjamin Kololli	FC Zürich
Midfielder	(Switzerland) Michel Aebischer	BSC Young Boys
Midfielder	(Switzerland) Jordi Quintillà	FC St. Gallen
Midfielder	(Switzerland) Christian Fassnacht	BSC Young Boys
Forward	(Brazil) Arthur Cabral	FC Basel
Forward	(Switzerland) Jean-Pierre Nsame	BSC Young Boys

== SAFP Golden 11 2019 ==
SAFP Golden 11 2019
Position	Player	Club
Goalkeeper	(Switzerland) Jonas Omlin	FC Basel
Defender	(Paraguay) Omar Alderete	FC Basel
Defender	(Switzerland) Eray Cömert	FC Basel
Defender	(Switzerland) Ulisses Garcia	BSC Young Boys
Defender	(Switzerland) Silvan Widmer	FC Basel
Midfielder	(Switzerland) Michel Aebischer	BSC Young Boys
Midfielder	(Switzerland) Christian Fassnacht	BSC Young Boys
Midfielder	(Cameroon) Nicolas Moumi Ngamaleu	BSC Young Boys
Midfielder	(Switzerland) Jordi Quintillà	FC St. Gallen
Forward	(Switzerland) Cedric Itten	FC St. Gallen
Forward	(Switzerland) Jean-Pierre Nsame	BSC Young Boys

== SAFP Golden11 2017 ==
Golden 11 Super League
Category	Winner	Club
Goalkeeper	(Czech Republic) Tomáš Vaclík	FC Basel
Defender	(Belgium) Kevin Mbabu	BSC Young Boys
Defender	(Switzerland) Michael Lang	FC Basel
Defender	(Switzerland) Manuel Akanji	FC Basel
Defender	(Switzerland) Loris Benito	BSC Young Boys
Midfielder	(Switzerland) Renato Steffen	FC Basel
Midfielder	(Norway) Mohamed Elyounoussi	FC Basel
Midfielder	(Switzerland) Leonardo Bertone	BSC Young Boys
Midfielder	(France) Miralem Sulejmani	BSC Young Boys
Forward	(Ivory Coast) Roger Assalé	BSC Young Boys
Forward	(Switzerland) Marco Rapp	FC Thun

Golden 11 Challenge League
Position	Player	Club
Goalkeeper	(Switzerland) Marko Nikolić	FC Schaffhausen
Defender	(Switzerland) Anthony Sauthier	Servette FC
Defender	(Switzerland) Wilfried Sejmenovic	Neuchâtel Xamax FCS
Defender	(Switzerland) Nathan	Servette FC
Defender	(Switzerland) Le Pogam	Servette FC
Midfielder	(Serbia) Miroslav Stevanovic	Servette FC
Midfielder	(Uruguay) Joaquin Ardaiz Castroman	FC Wohlen / FC Schaffhausen
Midfielder	(Switzerland) Gaëtan Doudin	Neuchâtel Xamax FCS
Midfielder	(Switzerland) Kevin Lang	Servette FC
Forward	(Argentina) Raphaël Nuzzolo	Neuchâtel Xamax FCS
Forward	(Switzerland) Mersim Cicek	FC Schaffhausen

SAFP Award 2017
Award	Winner	Club
Super League Best Player 2017	(Switzerland) Michael Lang	FC Basel 1893
Challenge League Best Player 2017	(Kosovo) Raphaël Nuzzolo	Neuchâtel Xamax FCS
Swiss Football League Best Youngster 2017	(Switzerland) Dimitri Oberlin	FC Basel 1893
Swiss Football League Best Coach 2017	(Switzerland) Murat Yakin	FC Schaffhausen / Grasshopper Club Zürich
«Mein Spieler 2017» (Publikumsliebling)	(Switzerland) Michael Lang	FC Basel 1893
Swiss Football League Best Goal 2017	(Switzerland) Jean-Pierre Nsame	BSC Young Boys

== SAFP Golden11 2016 ==
SAFP Golden11 2016
Category	Winner	Club
Goalkeeper	(Czech Republic) Tomáš Vaclík	FC Basel
Defender	(Czech Republic) Jan Lecjaks	BSC Young Boys
Defender	(Switzerland) Reto Ziegler	FC Sion
Defender	(Czech Republic) Marek Suchý	FC Basel
Defender	(Switzerland) Michael Lang	FC Basel
Midfielder	(Spain) Carlitos	FC Sion
Midfielder	(Argentina) Matías Delgado	FC Basel
Midfielder	(Switzerland) Denis Zakaria	BSC Young Boys
Midfielder	(North Macedonia) Ezgjan Alioski	FC Lugano
Forward	(France) Guillaume Hoarau	BSC Young Boys
Forward	(Switzerland) Marco Schneuwly	FC Luzern

== Golden Player 2015 ==
Golden Player 2015
Category	Winner	Club
SAFP Golden Player	(Cameroon) Breel Embolo	FC Basel
Best Challenge League Player	(Croatia) Marko Bašić	FC Lugano
Best Goalkeeper	(Czech Republic) Tomáš Vaclík	FC Basel
Best Defender	(Czech Republic) Marek Suchý	FC Basel
Best Midfielder	(Switzerland) Luca Zuffi	FC Basel
Best Forward	(Israel) Munas Dabbur	Grasshopper Club Zürich
Best Young Player	(Cameroon) Breel Embolo	FC Basel
Best Super League Coach	(Switzerland) Urs Fischer	FC Basel
Best Challenge League Coach	(Switzerland) Ciriaco Sforza	FC Wil

== Golden Player 2014 ==
Golden Player 2014
Category	Winner	Club
SAFP Golden Player	(Switzerland) Shkelzen Gashi	FC Basel
Best Challenge League Player	(Switzerland) Gianluca Frontino	FC Winterthur
Best Goalkeeper	(Switzerland) Yann Sommer	FC Basel
Best Defender	(Switzerland) Fabian Schär	FC Basel
Best Midfielder	(Tunisia) Yassine Chikhaoui	FC Zürich
Best Forward	(Switzerland) Shkelzen Gashi	FC Basel
Best Young Player	(Cameroon) Breel Embolo	FC Basel
Best Super League Coach	(Switzerland) Murat Yakin	FC Basel
Best Challenge League Coach	(Switzerland) Giorgio Contini	FC Vaduz

== Golden Player 2013 ==
Golden Player 2013
Category	Winner	Club
SAFP Golden Player	(Egypt) Mohamed Salah	FC Basel
Best Challenge League Player	(Switzerland) Davide Callà	FC St. Gallen
Best Goalkeeper	(Switzerland) Yann Sommer	FC Basel
Best Defender	(Switzerland) Fabian Schär	FC Basel
Best Midfielder	(Switzerland) Vero Salatic	Grasshopper Club Zürich
Best Forward	(Switzerland) Marco Streller	FC Basel
Best Young Player	(Switzerland) Fabian Schär	FC Basel
Best Super League Coach	(Switzerland) Uli Forte	FC Zürich
Best Challenge League Coach	(Switzerland) Martin Andermatt	FC Schaffhausen

== Golden Player 2012 ==
Golden Player 2012
Category	Winner	Club
SAFP Golden Player	(Switzerland) Xherdan Shaqiri	FC Basel
Best Challenge League Player	(Ivory Coast) Oscar Scarione	FC Thun
Best Goalkeeper	(Switzerland) Yann Sommer	FC Basel
Best Defender	(Austria) Aleksandar Dragović	FC Basel
Best Midfielder	(Sweden) Alexander Farnerud	FC Basel
Best Forward	(Switzerland) Alexander Frei	FC Basel
Best Young Player	(Switzerland) Xherdan Shaqiri	FC Basel

== Golden Player 2011 ==
Golden Player 2011
Category	Winner	Club
SAFP Golden Player	(Switzerland) Xherdan Shaqiri	FC Basel
Best Goalkeeper	(Latvia) Andris Vaņins	FC Sion
Best Defender	(Argentina) David Angel Abraham	FC Basel
Best Midfielder	(Switzerland) Xherdan Shaqiri	FC Basel
Best Forward	(Switzerland) Alexander Frei	FC Basel
Best Young Player	(Switzerland) Xherdan Shaqiri	FC Basel
Best Challenge League Player	Silvio	Unknown

== Golden Player 2010 ==
Golden Player 2010
Category	Winner	Club
Swiss Golden Player	(Ivory Coast) Seydou Doumbia	CSKA Moscow / BSC Young Boys
Goalkeeper	(Switzerland) Yann Sommer	FC Basel
Defender	(Bosnia and Herzegovina) Emiliano Dudar	BSC Young Boys
Midfielder	(Ivory Coast) Gilles Yapi	FC Basel
Forward	(Ivory Coast) Seydou Doumbia	CSKA Moscow / BSC Young Boys
Young Player	(Switzerland) Xherdan Shaqiri	FC Basel
Challenge League Player	(Ivory Coast) Oscar Scarione	FC Thun

== Golden Player 2009 ==
Golden Player 2009
Category	Winner	Club
Swiss Golden Player	(Switzerland) Almen Abdi	FC Zürich
Goalkeeper	(Argentina) Franco Costanzo	FC Basel
Defender	(Finland) Hannu Tihinen	FC Zürich
Midfielder	(Switzerland) Almen Abdi	FC Zürich
Forward	(France) Eric Hassli	FC Zürich
Young Player	(Ivory Coast) Seydou Doumbia	BSC Young Boys
Challenge League Player	(Argentina) Vincenzo Renella	AC Lugano

== Golden Player 2008 ==
Golden Player 2008
Category	Winner	Club
Swiss Golden Player	(Switzerland) Hakan Yakin	BSC Young Boys
Goalkeeper	(Argentina) Franco Costanzo	FC Basel
Defender	(Croatia) Daniel Majstorović	FC Basel
Midfielder	(Switzerland) Hakan Yakin	BSC Young Boys
Forward	(Argentina) Raul Bobadilla	Grasshopper Club Zürich
Young Player	(Switzerland) Valentin Stocker	FC Basel

== Golden Player 2007 ==
Golden Player 2007
Category	Winner	Club
Swiss Golden Player	(France) Mladen Petrić	FC Basel
Goalkeeper	(Switzerland) Germano Vailati	FC Sion
Defender	(Switzerland) Steve von Bergen	FC Zürich
Midfielder	(Switzerland) Blerim Džemaili	FC Zürich
Forward	(France) Mladen Petrić	FC Basel
Young Player	(Serbia) Zdravko Kuzmanović	FC Basel

== SAFP Women’s Golden Player & Golden 11 ==
The SAFP Women’s awards recognise the best female football players in Switzerland, including the Golden Player and the Golden XI selection.

== SAFP Women Golden 11 2025-2026 ==
Golden 11 Super League
Position	Player	Club
Golden Player	(Sweden) Anna Maria Therese Simonsson	Servette FC Chênois Féminin
GK	(Spain) Enith Salón Marcuello	Servette FC Chênois Féminin
DF	(France) Daïna Bourma	Servette FC Chênois Féminin
DF	(Spain) Marta Cazalla García	GC Frauenfussball
DF	(Switzerland) Naomi Mégroz	FC Zürich Frauen
MF	(Kosovo) Qendresa Krasniqi	GC Frauenfussball
MF	(United States) Athena Kuehn	BSC YB Frauen
MF	(Spain) Asun Martínez	Servette FC Chênois Féminin
MF	(Spain) Paula Serrano	Servette FC Chênois Féminin
FW	(Jamaica) Paige Bailey-Gayle	FC Rapperswil-Jona
FW	(Republic of Ireland) Kayla Jay McKenna	GC Frauenfussball
FW	(Sweden) Anna Maria Therese Simonsson	Servette FC Chênois Féminin

== SAFP Women Golden 11 2024-2025 ==
Golden 11 Super League
Position	Player	Club
Golden Player	(Switzerland) Naomi Luyet	BSC YB Frauen
GK	(Switzerland) Noemi Benz	FC Zürich
DF	(Switzerland) Larina Baumann	FC St. Gallen 1879
DF	(Switzerland) Jana Brunner	FC St. Gallen 1879
DF	(Poland) Oliwia Wos	FC Basel 1893
DF	(Switzerland) Vanesa Hoti	FC Aarau Frauen
MF	(Switzerland) Qendresa Krasniqi	FC Basel 1893
MF	(Switzerland) Stephanie Waeber	BSC YB Frauen
MF	(Switzerland) Noemi Ivelj	GC Frauenfussball
FW	(Switzerland) Iman Beney	BSC YB Frauen
FW	(Switzerland) Naomi Luyet	BSC YB Frauen
FW	(Morocco) Imane Saoud	Servette FC Chênois Féminin

== SAFP Women Golden 11 2023-2024 ==
Golden 11 Super League
Position	Player	Club
Best Player	(Serbia) Milena Nikolić	FC Basel
GK	(Switzerland) Lorena Barth	FC Aarau
DF	(Switzerland) Julia Stierli	FC Zürich Frauen
DF	(Portugal) Mónica Mendes	Servette FC Chênois
DF	(Switzerland) Naomi Mégroz	FC Zürich Frauen
DF	(Switzerland) Luna Lempérière	Grasshopper Club Zürich Frauen
MF	(Switzerland) Stephanie Waeber	BSC YB Frauen
MF	(Switzerland) Sandrine Mauron	Servette FC Chênois
MF	(Switzerland) Seraina Piubel	FC Zürich Frauen
FW	(Switzerland) Aurélie Csillag	FC Basel
FW	(Serbia) Milena Nikolić	FC Basel
FW	(Switzerland) Courtney Strode	BSC YB Frauen

== SAFP Women Golden 11 2022-2023 ==
Golden 11 Super League
Position	Player	Club
Best Player	(China) Zhang Linyan	Grasshopper Club Zürich Frauen
GK	(Portugal) Inês Pereira	Servette FC Chênois
DF	(Switzerland) Julia Stierli	FC Zürich Frauen
DF	(Switzerland) Nadine Riesen	FC Zürich Frauen
DF	(Spain) Marta Cazalla	Grasshopper Club Zürich Frauen
DF	(Switzerland) Luna Lempérière	Grasshopper Club Zürich Frauen
MF	(Switzerland) Iman Beney	BSC YB Frauen
MF	(Switzerland) Marie Höbinger	FC Zürich Frauen
MF	(Switzerland) Seraina Piubel	FC Zürich Frauen
MF	(China) Zhang Linyan	Grasshopper Club Zürich Frauen
FW	(Switzerland) Eva Bachmann	FC St. Gallen Frauen
FW	(Spain) Natalia Padilla-Bidas	Servette FC Chênois

== SAFP Women Golden 11 2021 ==
Golden 11 Super League
Position	Player	Club
GK	(Switzerland) Livia Peng	FC Zürich Frauen
DF	(Switzerland) Laura Felber	Servette FC Chênois Féminin
DF	(Switzerland) Thaís Hurni	Servette FC Chênois Féminin
DF	(Switzerland) Julia Stierli	FC Zürich Frauen
DF	(Switzerland) Riana Fischer	FC Zürich Frauen
MF	(Switzerland) Nadine Riesen	FC St. Gallen-Staad
MF	(Switzerland) Sandy Maendly	Servette FC Chênois Féminin
MF	(Switzerland) Riola Xhemaili	SC Freiburg / FC Basel
MF	(Switzerland) Stefanie Da Eira	BSC YB Frauen
FW	(Switzerland) Fabienne Humm	FC Zürich Frauen
FW	(Switzerland) Svenja Fölmli	FC Luzern

== SAFP Women Golden 11 2018-2019 ==
Golden 11 Super League
Category	Winner	Club
Best Goalkeeper	(Switzerland) Miranda Horn	Lugano Femminile
Best Defender	(Switzerland) Jana Brunner	FC Basel 1893 Frauen
Best Defender	(Switzerland) Carolin Abbé	FC Zürich Frauen
Best Defender	(Switzerland) Naomi Mégroz	FC Zürich Frauen
Best Defender	(Switzerland) Elizabeth Wenger	Lugano Femminile
Best Midfielder	(Switzerland) Melanie Müller	FC Luzern
Best Midfielder	(Switzerland) Malin Gut	FC Zürich Frauen
Best Midfielder	(Switzerland) Martina Moser	FC Zürich Frauen
Best Midfielder	(United States) Lauren Curtin	Lugano Femminile
Best Forward	(Switzerland) Irina Brütsch	FC Luzern
Best Forward	(Switzerland) Florijana Ismaili	BSC Young Boys

== SAFP Women Golden Player 2017 ==
Awards
Award	Winner	Club
SAFP Golden Player (Women) 2017	(Switzerland) Géraldine Reuteler	FC Luzern Frauen
Coach of the Year 2017	(Switzerland) Frédéric Mauron	FC Yverdon Féminin

SAFP Golden XI (Women) 2017
Player	Club
(Switzerland) Seraina Friedli	FC Zürich Frauen
(Switzerland) Jana Brunner	FC Basel 1893 Frauen
(Switzerland) Riana Fischer	FC Zürich Frauen
(Switzerland) Julia Stierli	FC Zürich Frauen
(Switzerland) Melanie Huber	FC Basel 1893 Frauen
(Switzerland) Malin Gut	FC Zürich Frauen
(Switzerland) Sandrine Mauron	FC Zürich Frauen
(Switzerland) Melanie Müller	BSC YB-Frauen
(Switzerland) Thais Hurni	BSC YB-Frauen
(Switzerland) Géraldine Reuteler	FC Luzern Frauen
(Switzerland) Florijana Ismaili	BSC YB-Frauen

== SAFP Women’s Golden Player Awards 2016 ==
Category	Winner	Club
SAFP Golden Player	(Switzerland) Eseosa Aigbogun	FFC Turbine Potsdam
Coach of the Year	(Switzerland) Dorjee Tsawa	FC Zürich
Golden XI	(Switzerland) Seraina Friedli	FC Zürich
Golden XI	(Switzerland) Riana Fischer	FC Zürich
Golden XI	(Switzerland) Sarah Steinmann	Grasshopper Club Zürich
Golden XI	(Switzerland) Selina Kuster	FC Zürich
Golden XI	(Slovakia) Lucia Harsányová	FC Neuenkirch
Golden XI	(Switzerland) Florijana Ismaili	BSC Young Boys
Golden XI	(Switzerland) Sandy Maendly	FC Neuenkirch
Golden XI	(Switzerland) Sandrine Mauron	FC Zürich
Golden XI	(Switzerland) Meriame Terchoun	FC Zürich
Golden XI	(Switzerland) Fabienne Humm	FC Zürich
Golden XI	(Switzerland) Eseosa Aigbogun	FFC Turbine Potsdam

== SAFP Women’s Golden Player Awards 2015 ==
Category	Player	Club
SAFP Golden Player	(Switzerland) Patricia Willi	—
Golden XI	(Switzerland) Seraina Friedli	—
Golden XI	(Switzerland) Sarah Steinmann	—
Golden XI	(Switzerland) Selina Kuster	—
Golden XI	(Switzerland) Riana Fischer	—
Golden XI	(Switzerland) Nicole Remund	—
Golden XI	(Switzerland) Sandrine Mauron	—
Golden XI	(Nigeria) Florijana Ismaili	—
Golden XI	(Nigeria) Eseosa Aigbogun	—
Golden XI	(Switzerland) Meriame Terchoun	—
Golden XI	(Switzerland) Fabienne Humm	—
Golden XI	(Switzerland) Patricia Willi	—

== SAFP Women’s Golden Player 2014 ==
Category	Winner	Club
SAFP Golden Player	(Switzerland) Fabienne Humm	FC Zürich Frauen
