= Tatia Dumbadse =

Georgian footballer

Personal information
- Date of birth: 21 August 1998 (age 28)
- Height: 1.75 m (5 ft 9 in)
- Position: Midfielder

Youth career
- Aliso Niguel High School
- San Diego Surf Soccer Club

International career^{‡}
Years	Team	Apps	(Gls)
2015	Georgia U19	3	(0)
2015	Georgia	2	(0)
- ‡ National team caps and goals as of 27 October 2015

Tatia Dumbadse (born 21 August 1998) is a Georgian footballer who plays as a midfielder. She has played officially for the senior Georgia women's national team.

== International career ==
Dumbadse capped for Georgia at senior level during the UEFA Women's Euro 2017 qualifying Group 6, in a 0–3 home loss to Northern Ireland on 24 October 2015 and a 0–4 away loss to Switzerland three days later.
