= Daniel Santos =

Daniel Santos may refer to:

- Daniel Santos (boxer) (born 1975), Puerto Rican boxer
- Daniel Santos (fighter) (born 1995), Brazilian mixed martial artist
- Daniel Santos (politician) (born 1986), Brazilian politician
- Daniel Santos (singer) (1916–1992), Puerto Rican singer and composer
- Daniel Santos in Bitten

== See also ==
- Daniel dos Santos (disambiguation)
