= Tissot Arena =

Sports venue in Biel, Switzerland

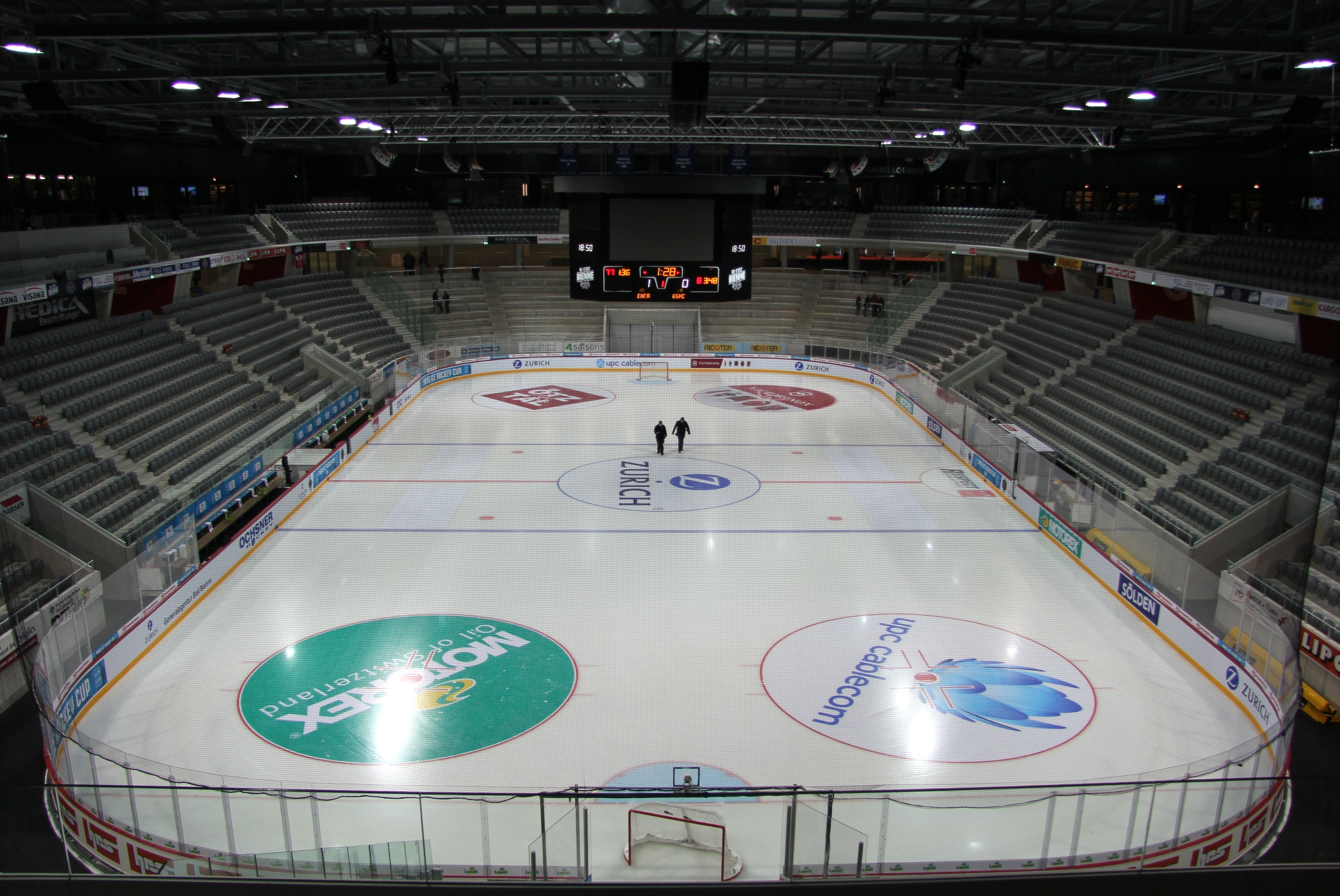
- Ice hockey arena
- Interactive map of Tissot Arena
- Location: Längfeldweg 95, Biel/Bienne, Switzerland
- Coordinates: 47°09′20.9″N 7°16′53.2″E
- Owner: City of Biel/Bienne
- Capacity: 5,200 (football); 6,521 (ice hockey)
- Surface: Grass, Ice

Construction
- Built: 2012–2015
- Opened: 8 August 2015
- General contractor: HRS Real Estate AG

Tenants
- FC Biel-Bienne (Promotion League); EHC Biel (NL) (2015-present)

Tissot Arena (/tiːˈsoʊ/) is a combined multi-purpose stadium and arena in Biel/Bienne, Canton of Bern, Switzerland. It consists of a football stadium, an ice hockey arena, an outdoor ice skating rink and a curling hall. It is currently used by Swiss Promotion League football club, FC Biel-Bienne and National League A ice hockey club, EHC Biel.

== Overview ==
The stadium and arena of the Tissot Arena serve as replacements of the Gurzelen football stadium and the Biel ice hockey arena. The football stadium part of the Tissot Arena is in the south-west side of the building complex and the ice rinks in the north-east. The watch manufacturer Tissot, a member of The Swatch Group that has a head office in Biel/Bienne, obtained naming rights of the arena for at least ten years.

The football stadium has a capacity of 5,200 and it is extendable to 10,000 if needed. The ice hockey arena accommodates 6,521 spectators. Part of the electricity for the arena complex is produced by the 8,100 solar panels installed on the roofs of the Arena.

== International matches ==
=== Football ===
==== Men's national teams ====
Date		Result		Competition
10 October 2017	South Korea	1–3	Morocco	Friendly

==== Women's national teams ====
Date		Result		Competition
22 September 2015	Switzerland	4–1	Denmark	Friendly
27 October 2015	Switzerland	4–0	Georgia	UEFA Women's Euro 2017 qualifying
9 April 2016	Switzerland	2–1	Italy	UEFA Women's Euro 2017 qualifying
20 September 2016	Switzerland	4–0	Northern Ireland	UEFA Women's Euro 2017 qualifying
10 June 2017	Switzerland	0–4	England	Friendly
19 September 2017	Switzerland	2–1	Poland	2019 FIFA Women's World Cup qualification
28 November 2017	Switzerland	5–1	Albania	2019 FIFA Women's World Cup qualification
9 October 2018	Switzerland	1–1	Belgium	2019 FIFA Women's World Cup qualification
5 April 2019	Switzerland	0–0	Finland	Friendly

=== Ice hockey ===
Date		Result		Competition
15 April 2016	Switzerland	1–2 OT	Czech Republic	Euro Hockey Challenge
16 December 2016	Slovakia	1–7	Belarus	Swiss Ice Hockey Challenge
16 December 2016	Switzerland	1–0	France	Swiss Ice Hockey Challenge
17 December 2016	Slovakia	6–1	France	Swiss Ice Hockey Challenge
17 December 2016	Switzerland	6–1	Belarus	Swiss Ice Hockey Challenge
2 April 2017	Switzerland	2–0	Russia	Euro Hockey Challenge
8 November 2017	Switzerland	2–3	Canada	Karjala Cup
30 April 2021	Switzerland	3–1	Russia	Exhibition
1 May 2021	Switzerland	1–0	Russia	Exhibition

== See also ==
- List of indoor arenas in Switzerland
