= FC Porto (women) =

Porto
- Full name: Futebol Clube do Porto
- Nicknames: Dragões (Dragons); Azuis e brancos (Blue-and-Whites)
- Founded: 21 June 2024 (2 years ago)
- Ground: CTFD Jorge Costa
- Capacity: 3,800
- President: André Villas-Boas
- Director: José Manuel Ferreira
- Coach: Daniel Chaves
- League: Campeonato Nacional Feminino
- 2025–26: Campeonato Nacional II Divisão, 1st of 16 (champions)
- Website: www.fcporto.pt/pt/futebol/feminino/noticias
| Home colours | Away colours | Third colours |

Futebol Clube do Porto, also referred to as FC Porto or simply Porto, is a Portuguese women's football team based in Porto, which plays in the Campeonato Nacional Feminino, the top-tier league of women's football in Portugal. Established in 2024, it represents the women's football department of sports club FC Porto.

Their home ground is the club's training centre CTFD Jorge Costa in Olival, Vila Nova de Gaia.

== History ==
The creation of the women's team was announced in June 2024 with the appointment of José Manuel Ferreira as its director, and was officially registered in July with the Portuguese Football Federation for participation in national competitions. The team was officially presented in a match against União de Leiria at the Estádio do Dragão, which ended with a 9–0 victory and set an attendance record for women's football in Portugal at 31,093 spectators.

Starting their competitive history in the third division, Porto secured consecutive league promotions to secure a place in the top-tier Primeira Divisão for the 2026–27 season. In their second participation in the Taça de Portugal, they reached the final of the competition for the first time, after overcoming several first-tier opponents, losing 2–0 against Benfica. In the Taça AF Porto, they contested the final against Valadares Gaia.

== Players ==
=== First team ===
As of 30 August 2026

Note: Flags indicate national team as defined under FIFA eligibility rules; some limited exceptions apply. Players may hold more than one non-FIFA nationality.

| No. | Pos. | Nation | Player |
|---|---|---|---|
| 1 | GK | USA | Cora Brendle |
| 2 | DF | POR | Ema Gonçalves (captain) |
| 3 | DF | POR | Mariana Queirós |
| 4 | DF | SLO | Lana Golob |
| 5 | DF | POR | Lara Filipe |
| 5 | DF | POR | Alice Reto |
| 6 | MF | POR | Letícia Almeida |
| 7 | FW | POR | Maria Ferreira |
| 8 | MF | USA | Morgan Stone |
| 9 | FW | USA | Alex Kerr |
| 10 | MF | POR | Maria Negrão |
| 11 | MF | POR | Ana Teles |
| 12 | MF | USA | Eliza Turner |
| 13 | FW | USA | Lily Bryant |
| 14 | MF | POR | Angeline da Costa |

| No. | Pos. | Nation | Player |
|---|---|---|---|
| 16 | MF | POR | Matilde Vaz |
| 17 | DF | POR | Mariana Azevedo |
| 18 | MF | POR | Fátima Pinto |
| 19 | DF | POR | Sofia Silva |
| 20 | DF | POR | Inês Nogueira |
| 21 | FW | POR | Lara Perruca |
| 22 | DF | POR | Joana Ferreira |
| 23 | FW | GBS | Fatumata Sissé |
| 24 | DF | POR | Vânia Duarte |
| 25 | GK | POR | Beatriz Carvalho |
| 28 | GK | POR | Tatiana Beleza |
| 29 | FW | BRA | Mylena Freitas |
| 30 | DF | POR | Daniela Santos |
| 33 | GK | POR | Bárbara Marques |
| 99 | GK | POR | Raquel Cunha |

== Honours ==
=== First team ===
- Campeonato Nacional II Divisão
  - Winners (1): 2025–26
- Campeonato Nacional III Divisão
  - Winners (1): 2024–25
- Taça de Portugal
  - Runners-up (1): 2025–26
- Supertaça de Portugal
  - Runners-up (1): 2026

=== B team ===
- Campeonato Nacional IV Divisão
  - Winners (1): 2025–26

=== Youth teams ===
- Campeonato Nacional Sub-19 II Divisão
  - Winners (1): 2025–26
