= UEFA Women's Euro 2017 qualifying Group 6 =

Football tournament qualification stage

Group 6 of the UEFA Women's Euro 2017 qualifying competition consisted of five teams: Italy, Switzerland, Czech Republic, Northern Ireland, and Georgia. The composition of the eight groups in the qualifying group stage was decided by the draw held on 20 April 2015.

The group was played in home-and-away round-robin format. The group winners qualified directly for the final tournament, while the runners-up also qualified directly if they were one of the six best runners-up among all eight groups (not counting results against the fifth-placed team); otherwise, the runners-up advance to the play-offs.

== Standings ==
Pos	Team	Pld	W	D	L	GF	GA	GD	Pts	Qualification	Switzerland	Italy	Czech Republic		Georgia
1	Switzerland	8	8	0	0	34	3	+31	24	Final tournament	—	2–1	5–1	4–0	4–0
2	Italy	8	6	0	2	26	8	+18	18	Final tournament	0–3	—	3–1	3–1	6–1
3	Czech Republic	8	3	1	4	13	18	−5	10		0–5	0–3	—	3–0	4–1
4	Northern Ireland	8	2	1	5	10	22	−12	7		1–8	0–3	1–1	—	4–0
5	Georgia	8	0	0	8	2	34	−32	0		0–3	0–7	0–3	0–3	—

Source: UEFA
Rules for classification: Qualification tiebreakers

== Matches ==
Times are CEST (UTC+2) for dates between 29 March and 24 October 2015 and between 27 March and 29 October 2016, for other dates times are CET (UTC+1).

18 September 2015
18:30

Italy	6–1	Georgia
Cernoia 13'; Giugliano 23'; Manieri 42'; Sabatino 58'; Girelli 79', 83'	Report	Gabelia 3'

Stadio Alberto Picco, La Spezia
Attendance: 2,100
Referee: Zuzana Kováčová (Slovakia)

22 September 2015
17:00

Georgia	0–3	Czech Republic
	Report	I. Martínková 69', 88'; Voňková 73'

Mikheil Meskhi Stadium, Tbilisi
Attendance: 1,100
Referee: Paula Brady (Republic of Ireland)

24 October 2015
14:30

Italy	0–3	Switzerland
	Report	Bachmann 59', 62'; Crnogorčević 87'

Stadio Dino Manuzzi, Cesena
Attendance: 2,500
Referee: Pernilla Larsson (Sweden)
24 October 2015
16:00

Georgia	0–3	Northern Ireland
	Report	Nelson 3'; Bergin 29', 56'

Mikheil Meskhi Stadium, Tbilisi
Attendance: 500
Referee: Barbara Poxhofer (Austria)

27 October 2015
18:15

Czech Republic	0–3	Italy
	Report	Mauro 19'; Manieri 42' (pen.); Bartoli 78'

Letní stadion, Chomutov
Attendance: 1,260
Referee: Katalin Kulcsár (Hungary)
27 October 2015
18:30

Switzerland	4–0	Georgia
Skhirtladze 9' (o.g.); Crnogorčević 34'; Dickenmann 50'; Humm 74'	Report

Tissot Arena, Biel/Bienne
Attendance: 2,252
Referee: Sofia Karagiorgi (Cyprus)

27 November 2015
20:30

Northern Ireland	1–8	Switzerland
Furness 37'	Report	Humm 14', 35'; Kiwic 28'; Moser 33'; Ismaili 36'; Crnogorčević 59'; Deplazes 74'; Dickenmann 85'

Mourneview Park, Lurgan
Attendance: 250
Referee: Zuzana Kováčová (Slovakia)

1 December 2015
19:00

Switzerland	5–1	Czech Republic
Bürki 23'; Humm 28'; Bachmann 33'; Crnogorčević 42'; Terchoun 84'	Report	Svitková 73'

Stade de la Maladière, Neuchâtel
Attendance: 2,008
Referee: Kateryna Zora (Ukraine)

9 April 2016
17:30

Switzerland	2–1	Italy
Bachmann 7'; Terchoun 36'	Report	Parisi 65'

Tissot Arena, Biel/Bienne
Attendance: 2,208
Referee: Morag Pirie (Scotland)

12 April 2016
17:00

Czech Republic	4–1	Georgia
L. Martínková 3', 57'; Zakhaidze 13' (o.g.); Voňková 51'	Report	Skhirtladze 45+1'

Stadion v Městských sadech, Opava
Attendance: 786
Referee: Frida Nielsen (Denmark)
12 April 2016
18:00

Italy	3–1	Northern Ireland
Sabatino 71'; Mauro 86'; Stracchi 90+3'	Report	Magill 62'

Mapei Stadium – Città del Tricolore, Reggio Emilia
Attendance: 1,114
Referee: Lina Lehtovaara (Finland)

3 June 2016
20:30

Northern Ireland	4–0	Georgia
Magill 1'; Callaghan 21', 40'; Furness 90+5'	Report

Solitude, Belfast
Attendance: 320
Referee: Viola Raudziņa (Latvia)

4 June 2016
17:00

Czech Republic	0–5	Switzerland
	Report	Humm 4'; Moser 35', 90+3'; Crnogorčević 40', 66' (pen.)

Stadion Střelnice, Jablonec nad Nisou
Attendance: 632
Referee: Monika Mularczyk (Poland)

7 June 2016
16:00

Georgia	0–7	Italy
	Report	Manieri 7'; Bonansea 21', 59'; Sabatino 41'; Mauro 75'; Girelli 79' (pen.), 90'

Tengiz Burjanadze Stadium, Gori
Attendance: 450
Referee: Florence Guillemin (France)
7 June 2016
19:30

Czech Republic	3–0	Northern Ireland
Voňková 3'; Cahynová 34'; Bartoňová 65'	Report

Stadion Střelnice, Jablonec nad Nisou
Attendance: 467
Referee: Marte Sørø (Norway)

3 August 2016
20:30

Northern Ireland	1–1	Czech Republic
Furness 55' (pen.)	Report	Chlastáková 35'

Mourneview Park, Lurgan
Attendance: 332
Referee: Sara Persson (Sweden)

Game was originally scheduled for 8 April 2016 at 20:30 but was postponed due to an accident on the motorway, which made it impossible for the teams to arrive at the stadium.

15 September 2016
14:00

Georgia	0–3	Switzerland
	Report	Crnogorčević 18' (pen.); Humm 34'; Dickenmann 90+4'

Tengiz Burjanadze Stadium, Gori
Attendance: 350
Referee: Marta Huerta De Aza (Spain)

16 September 2016
20:30

Northern Ireland	0–3	Italy
	Report	Girelli 45+1', 90+4'; Gabbiadini 76'

Mourneview Park, Lurgan
Attendance: 300
Referee: Gyöngyi Gaál (Hungary)

20 September 2016
19:00

Switzerland	4–0	Northern Ireland
Bernauer 17', 46'; Kiwic 42'; Rinast 54'	Report

Tissot Arena, Biel/Bienne
Attendance: 1,308
Referee: Tanja Subotič (Slovenia)
20 September 2016
19:00

Italy	3–1	Czech Republic
Mauro 6', 14'; Guagni 62'	Report	Voňková 13'

Stadio Silvio Piola, Vercelli
Attendance: 2,731
Referee: Sandra Bastos (Portugal)

== Goalscorers ==
7 goals

- (Switzerland) Ana-Maria Crnogorčević

6 goals

- (Italy) Cristiana Girelli
- (Switzerland) Fabienne Humm

5 goals

- (Italy) Ilaria Mauro

4 goals

- (Czech Republic) Lucie Voňková
- (Switzerland) Ramona Bachmann

3 goals

- (Italy) Raffaella Manieri
- (Italy) Daniela Sabatino
- (Northern Ireland) Rachel Furness
- (Switzerland) Lara Dickenmann
- (Switzerland) Martina Moser

2 goals

- (Czech Republic) Irena Martínková
- (Czech Republic) Lucie Martínková
- (Italy) Barbara Bonansea
- (Northern Ireland) Avilla Bergin
- (Northern Ireland) Marissa Callaghan
- (Northern Ireland) Simone Magill
- (Switzerland) Vanessa Bernauer
- (Switzerland) Rahel Kiwic
- (Switzerland) Meriame Terchoun

1 goal

- (Czech Republic) Eva Bartoňová
- (Czech Republic) Klára Cahynová
- (Czech Republic) Jitka Chlastáková
- (Czech Republic) Kateřina Svitková
- (Georgia (country)) Gulnara Gabelia
- (Georgia (country)) Natia Skhirtladze
- (Italy) Elisa Bartoli
- (Italy) Valentina Cernoia
- (Italy) Melania Gabbiadini
- (Italy) Manuela Giugliano
- (Italy) Alia Guagni
- (Italy) Alice Parisi
- (Italy) Daniela Stracchi
- (Northern Ireland) Julie Nelson
- (Switzerland) Vanessa Bürki
- (Switzerland) Barla Deplazes
- (Switzerland) Florijana Ismaili
- (Switzerland) Rachel Rinast

1 own goal

- (Georgia (country)) Natia Skhirtladze (playing against Switzerland)
- (Georgia (country)) Ana Zakhaidze (playing against Czech Republic)
