= Florijana Ismaili =

Swiss footballer (1995–2019)

Personal information
- Full name: Florijana Ismaili
- Date of birth: 1 January 1995
- Place of birth: Aarberg, Switzerland
- Date of death: 29 June 2019 (aged 24)
- Place of death: Lake Como, Lombardy, Italy
- Height: 1.70 m (5 ft 7 in)
- Positions: Midfielder; forward

Youth career
- 2006–2011: FC Walperswil

Senior career*
Years	Team	Apps	(Gls)
2011–2019	BSC YB Frauen	160	(81)

International career
2014–2019	Switzerland	33	(3)
- * Club domestic league appearances and goals

Florijana Ismaili (1 January 1995 – 29 June 2019) was a Swiss footballer who played as a forward for BSC YB Frauen of Switzerland's Nationalliga A. She was a member of the Switzerland national team.

== Early life ==
Ismaili was born in Switzerland to parents of Albanian origins.

== International career ==
Ismaili debuted for Switzerland women's national football team January 2014, in a 2–1 win over Portugal. On 27 November 2015, she scored for Switzerland against Northern Ireland in a UEFA Women's Euro 2017 qualifying match. On 28 November 2017, she scored twice for Switzerland in a 2019 FIFA Women's World Cup qualifying match against Albania.

15 days before her death, she played in her final match for Switzerland on 14 June 2019 against Serbia.

== Death ==
On 29 June 2019, Ismaili dived into the water from a boat diving platform while on holiday at Lake Como in Lombardy, but did not resurface. The next day, she was declared missing. Local authorities conducted an investigation, including using remotely operated underwater vehicles (ROV). On 2 July, Ismaili's body was found at the bottom of Lake Como at a depth of 204 metres (669 feet). An autopsy revealed that the cause of death was "an acute episode of asphyxia." She had drowned.

== Career statistics ==
=== International (2014–2019) ===
Appearances and goals by national team and year
National team	Year	Apps	Goals
Switzerland	2014	4	0
Switzerland	2015	7	1
Switzerland	2016	4	0
Switzerland	2017	8	2
Switzerland	2018	7	0
Switzerland	2019	3	0
Total		33	3

=== International goals ===
Scores and results list Switzerland's goal tally first, score column indicates score after each Ismaili goal.

List of international goals scored by Florijana Ismaili
#	Date	Venue	Opponent	Score	Result	Competition
1.	27 November 2015	Lurgan, Northern Ireland	Northern Ireland	5–0	8–1	UEFA Women's Euro 2017 qualifying
2.	28 November 2017	Biel/Bienne, Switzerland	Albania	1–0	5–1	2019 FIFA Women's World Cup qualifying
3.	28 November 2017	Biel/Bienne, Switzerland	Albania	5–1	5–1	2019 FIFA Women's World Cup qualifying

== See also ==
- List of association football players who died during their careers
- List of solved missing person cases (post-2000)
