= Auður Sveinbjörnsdóttir Scheving =

Icelandic footballer

Personal information
- Date of birth: 12 August 2002 (age 24)
- Position: Goalkeeper

College career
Years	Team	Apps	(Gls)
2024–	LSU Tigers		

Auður Sveinbjörnsdóttir Scheving (born 12 August 2002) is an Icelandic football goalkeeper for UMF Afturelding and Iceland's women's national team.
