= Lúcia Alves =

Portuguese footballer (born 1997)

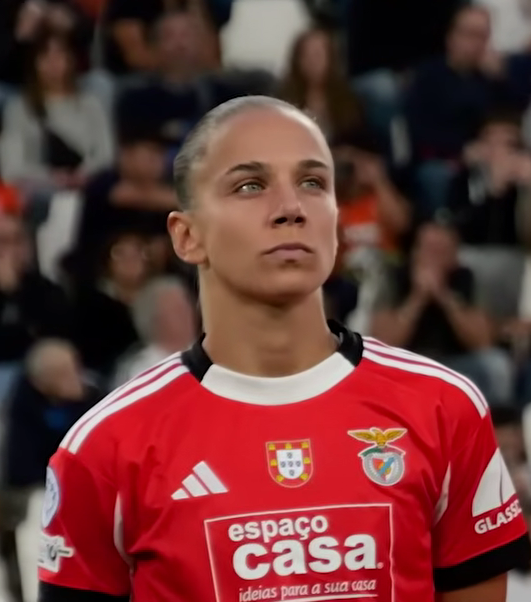
- Alves with Benfica in 2025

Personal information
- Full name: Lúcia Catarina de Sousa Alves
- Date of birth: 22 October 1997 (age 29)
- Height: 1.59 m (5 ft 3 in)
- Position: Defender

Team information
- Current team: Benfica
- Number: 13

Senior career*
Years	Team	Apps	(Gls)
2016–2017	S.C. Freamunde	2	(2)
2017–2019	Valadares Gaia	39	(15)
2019–	Benfica	88	(11)
2020–2021	→ Valadares Gaia (loan)	9	(5)

International career^{‡}
2021–	Portugal	24	(2)
- * Club domestic league appearances and goals as of 22 March 2025 ‡ National team caps and goals as of 22 March 2025

Lúcia Catarina de Sousa Alves (born 22 October 1997) is a Portuguese professional footballer who plays as a defender for Campeonato Nacional Feminino club SL Benfica and the Portugal women's national team.

== International career ==
On 17 June, Lúcia Alves replaced Mariana Azevedo who withdrew following a knee ligament injury sustained in training. Alves would join the Portuguese national team to the UEFA Women's Euro 2022.

On 30 May 2023, she was included in the 23-player squad for the FIFA Women's World Cup 2023.

On 24 June 2025, Alves was called up to the Portugal squad for the UEFA Women's Euro 2025.

== Honours ==
Benfica

- Campeonato Nacional Feminino: 2020–21, 2021–22, 2022–23, 2023–24, 2024–25, 2025–26
- Taça de Portugal: 2023–24, 2025–26
- Taça da Liga: 2019–20, 2020–21, 2022–23, 2023–24, 2024–25
- Supertaça de Portugal: 2019, 2022, 2023, 2026

Individual

- Cosme Damião Awards – Women's Footballer of the Year: 2025, 2026
- Record Campeonato Nacional Feminino Best Player: 2025–26

== International goals ==
Scores and results list Portugal's goal tally first.

No.	Date	Venue	Opponent	Score	Result	Competition
1.	31 May 2023	Estádio Dr. Magalhães Pessoa, Leiria, Portugal	Northern Ireland	2–0	4–0	UEFA Women's Euro 2025 qualifying
2.	31 May 2023	Estádio Dr. Magalhães Pessoa, Leiria, Portugal	Northern Ireland	4–0	4–0	UEFA Women's Euro 2025 qualifying
3.	3 March 2026	Estádio Capital do Móvel, Pacos de Ferreira, Portugal	Finland	1–0	2–0	2027 FIFA Women's World Cup qualification
