= Fátima Pinto =

Portuguese footballer (born 1996)

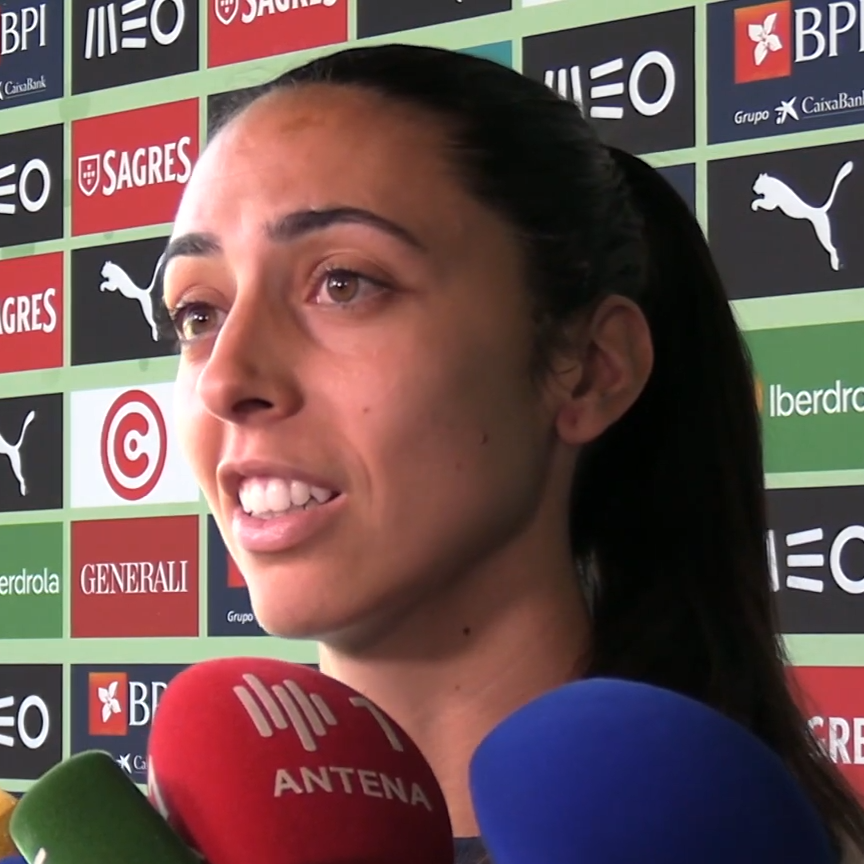
- Pinto in 2025

Personal information
- Full name: Fátima Alexandra Figueira Pinto
- Date of birth: 16 January 1996 (age 30)
- Place of birth: Funchal, Madeira, Portugal
- Height: 1.69 m (5 ft 7 in)
- Position: Defensive midfielder

Team information
- Current team: FC Porto

Senior career*
Years	Team	Apps	(Gls)
2011–2013	Grupo Desportivo APEL		
2013–2014	Atlético Ouriense		
2014–2016	Santa Teresa	53	(1)
2016–2022	Sporting CP	108	(26)
2022–2023	Alavés	19	(0)
2023–2025	Sporting CP	45	(2)
2025–2026	Strasbourg	15	(2)
2026–	FC Porto	0	(0)

International career^{‡}
2012–2015	Portugal U19	25	(4)
2013–	Portugal	102	(6)
- * Club domestic league appearances and goals as of 1 April 2026 ‡ National team caps and goals as of 9 October 2026

Fátima Alexandra Figueira Pinto (born 16 January 1996) is a Portuguese professional footballer who plays as a defensive midfielder for Campeonato Nacional Feminino club FC Porto and the Portugal national team.

== Club career ==
Pinto started to play football at the age of seven in amateur boy's teams. In 2011, at the age of 13, she started her career at the Grupo Desportivo APEL's women's team, a club from her native city, Funchal. In 2013, she signed with first division team Atlético Ouriense. With the club, Pinto was crowned the league's champions in the 2013/2014 season, becoming the first female player from the Madeira island to do so.

In the following season, she headed to Spain and signed with Primera División club, Santa Teresa CD. After two seasons, Pinto returned to Portugal to play for Sporting CP. With the club she was again crowned as a league champion in the 2016/2017 season. On 19 March 2018 Pinto was included by the "Quinas de Ouro" award among the "11 Best Players" in the Portuguese women's league. The award is annually organized by the Portuguese Football Federation together with the "Associação Nacional dos Treinadores de Futebol" and the "Sindicato dos Jogadores Profissionais de Futebol".

On 14 August 2026, Pinto signed a two-year contract with newly promoted Campeonato Nacional Feminino club FC Porto.

== International career ==
Pinto started to play for Portugal's Under-19 team in 2012. On 2 July 2012 she debuted for the U19 team in a match against Turkey U19, valid for the 2012 UEFA Women's Under-19 Championship. A championship in which Portugal reached the semi-finals for the first time in history. Pinto also represented Portugal at the 2013 UEFA Women's Under-19 Championship Qualifying Stages and the 2015 UEFA Women's Under-19 Championship Qualifying Stage. On 9 April 2015, again against Turkey U19, she played her last match for the Portugal U19 team, totalling 25 matches played and four goals scored for the team.

On 26 October 2013, in a defeat against Netherlands for the 2015 FIFA Women's World Cup qualification stage, Pinto debuted for the Portuguese senior team. On 6 July 2017, Pinto was called by coach Francisco Neto to represent Portugal at the UEFA Women's Euro 2017, becoming the first player from Madeira to ever represent Portugal in a UEFA Women's Championship.

On 30 May 2023, she was included in the 23-player squad for the FIFA Women's World Cup 2023. On 24 June 2025, Pinto was called up to the Portugal squad for the UEFA Women's Euro 2025.

== International goals ==
No.	Date	Venue	Opponent	Score	Result	Competition
1.	30 August 2018	Zimbru Stadium, Chișinău, Moldova	Moldova	7–0	7–0	2019 FIFA Women's World Cup qualification
2.	23 February 2021	Antonis Papadopoulos Stadium, Larnaca, Cyprus	Scotland	2–0	2–0	UEFA Women's Euro 2022 qualifying
3.	6 October 2022	Estádio do FC Vizela, Vizela, Portugal	Belgium	2–1	2–1	2023 FIFA Women's World Cup qualifying play-offs
4.	29 October 2024	Estádio do FC Vizela, Vizela, Portugal	Azerbaijan	4–0	4–0	UEFA Women's Euro 2025 qualifying play-offs
5.	23 October 2025	Subaru Park, Chester, United States	United States	2–1	2–1	Friendly
6.	9 October 2026	Inver Park, Larne, Northern Ireland	Northern Ireland	4–0	4–0	2027 FIFA Women's World Cup qualifying play-offs
