= Mariana Azevedo =

Portuguese footballer (born 1995)

Personal information
- Full name: Mariana Viana Azevedo
- Date of birth: 27 September 1995 (age 31)
- Height: 1.73 m (5 ft 8 in)
- Position: Defender

Team information
- Current team: FC Porto
- Number: 17

Senior career*
Years	Team	Apps	(Gls)
2012–2015	Vilaverdense		
2015–2017	Valadares Gaia	26	(4)
2017–2020	Sporting	24	(0)
2020–2022	Famalicão	39	(1)
2022–2025	Braga	24	(0)
2025–	Porto	18	(2)

International career^{‡}
2022–	Portugal	2	(0)
- * Club domestic league appearances and goals as of 9 September 2026 ‡ National team caps and goals as of 25 October 2023

Mariana Viana Azevedo (born 27 September 1995) is a Portuguese professional footballer who plays as a defender for FC Porto and the Portugal women's national team.

== International career ==
On 17 June, Lúcia Alves replaced Mariana Azevedo who withdrew following a knee ligament injury sustained in training. Alves would join the Portuguese national team to the UEFA Women's Euro 2022.
