= Natia Skhirtladze =

Georgian footballer

Personal information
- Full name: Natia Skhirtladze
- Date of birth: March 3, 1990 (age 36)
- Place of birth: Soviet Union (now Georgia)
- Position: Striker

International career^{‡}
Years	Team	Apps	(Gls)
2009–	Georgia	17	(o)
- ‡ National team caps and goals as of 22:36, 27 October 2015 (UTC)

Natia Skhirtladze (born 3 March 1990) is a Georgian football defender.
