= Vanesa Hoti =

Kosovan footballer

Personal information
- Date of birth: 3 August 1998 (age 28)
- Place of birth: Debar, Macedonia
- Height: 1.65 m (5 ft 5 in)
- Position: Midfielder

Team information
- Current team: FC Basel
- Number: 10

Youth career
- BSC Old Boys
- Basel

Senior career*
| Years | Team | Apps | (Gls) |
| 2015–2019 | Basel | 62 | (4) |
| 2019–2020 | Zürich | 16 | (1) |
| 2020– | Basel | 79 | (4) |

International career^{‡}
| 2014–2015 | Switzerland U17 | 5 | (1) |
| 2015–2016 | Switzerland U19 | 6 | (2) |
| 2024– | Kosovo | 1 | (0) |
- * Club domestic league appearances and goals as of 26 February 2024 ‡ National team caps and goals as of 26 February 2024

Vanesa Hoti (born 3 August 1998) is a professional footballer who plays as a midfielder for Swiss Super League club FC Basel. Born in Macedonia, she grew up in Basel and represented Switzerland at youth international level, before switching in 2024 to represent Kosovo.

== Career ==
=== Club ===
Vanesa Hoti broke through the Basel academy in 2015. She remained at the club for the next four seasons, making 62 total appearances and scoring 4 goals. In 2018/19, she played in the UEFA Women's Champions League qualifying round as her team narrowly missed out on qualification after a loss to Spartak Subotica. On 24 July 2019, she joined Zürich where she became a regular starter, helping them reach second place in the league, before the season was cancelled due to the COVID-19 pandemic. She also played in the 2019–20 UEFA Women's Champions League knockout phase in which Zürich was knocked out in the round of 32 by Minsk. On 27 July 2020, she returned to Basel.

=== International ===
Hoti scored a goal on her debut for the Swiss U17 team in a 5–0 win against Azerbaijan at the 2015 UEFA Women's Under-17 Championship qualification. She made 5 appearances as she helped her country qualify to the final tournament. She scored 2 goals for the Swiss U19 team in a 23–0 victory over Georgia at the 2016 UEFA Women's Under-19 Championship qualification. She also competed in the 2017 edition.

On 24 February 2024, she made her debut for Kosovo in a friendly win over Estonia.

== Career statistics ==
As of 26 February 2024

Appearances and goals by club, season and competition
| Club | Season | League | | | National Cup (Note: Includes Swiss Cup) | | Europe (Note: Includes UEFA Women's Champions League) | | Total | |
| Club | Season | Division | Apps | Goals | Apps | Goals | Apps | Goals | Apps | Goals |
|---|---|---|---|---|---|---|---|---|---|---|
| Basel | 2015/16 | Super League | 9 | 0 | — | | — | | 9 | 0 |
| Basel | 2016/17 | Super League | 9 | 1 | — | | — | | 9 | 1 |
| Basel | 2017/18 | Super League | 15 | 0 | 1 | 0 | — | | 16 | 0 |
| Basel | 2018/19 | Super League | 24 | 3 | 1 | 0 | 3 | 0 | 28 | 3 |
| Basel | Total | | 57 | 4 | 2 | 0 | 3 | 0 | 62 | 4 |
| Zürich | 2019/20 | Super League | 13 | 1 | 1 | 0 | 2 | 0 | 16 | 1 |
| Basel | 2020/21 | Super League | 25 | 0 | 4 | 1 | — | | 29 | 1 |
| Basel | 2021/22 | Super League | 20 | 1 | 2 | 0 | — | | 22 | 1 |
| Basel | 2022/23 | Super League | 16 | 0 | 2 | 1 | — | | 18 | 1 |
| Basel | 2023/24 | Super League | 10 | 1 | — | | — | | 10 | 1 |
| Basel | Total | | 71 | 2 | 8 | 2 | — | | 79 | 4 |
| Career Total | | | 141 | 7 | 11 | 2 | 5 | 0 | 157 | 9 |
