= Euro Hockey Challenge =

- Current season, competition or edition: 2018 Euro Hockey Challenge
- Sport: Ice hockey
- Founded: 2011
- No. of teams: 12
- Most recent champion: Sweden

The Euro Hockey Challenge is a competition consisting of the 12 best European ice hockey teams. It has been held annually in April since 2011, preceding the World Ice Hockey Championships.

== Setup ==
Each team plays six games during the tournament. Teams play each other twice in back-to-back games for one to two days. All games played count toward the final table.

The teams are divided into three pools based on their placing in the IIHF World Ranking. The top four teams make up Pool A, the next six are part of Pool B, and the final two are placed in Pool C. Teams are awarded three points for a victory in regulation, two points for an overtime victory, and one point for an overtime loss.

== Participating nations ==
The top 12 European nations in the IIHF World Ranking are eligible to participate.

The following nations participated in the 2013 tournament:

Pool A

- Russia
- Finland
- Sweden
- Czech Republic

Pool B

- Switzerland
- Germany
- Norway
- Slovakia
- Belarus
- Latvia

Pool C

- Denmark
- France

== Results ==
Year	Champion	2nd place	3rd place
2011	Finland	Sweden	Czech Republic
2012	Czech Republic	Switzerland	Finland
2013	Sweden	Finland	Norway
2014	Sweden	Finland	Czech Republic
2015	Czech Republic	Sweden	Finland
2016	Finland	Belarus	Czech Republic
2017	Switzerland	Finland	Czech Republic
2018	Czech Republic	Finland	Sweden
