= Íris Dögg Gunnarsdóttir =

Icelandic footballer (born 1989)

Personal information
- Date of birth: 18 September 1989 (age 37)
- Position: Goalkeeper

Íris Dögg Gunnarsdóttir (18 September 1989) is an Icelandic football goalkeeper for Þróttur Reykjavík and Iceland's national team.
