= Meriame Terchoun =

Swiss footballer (born 1995)

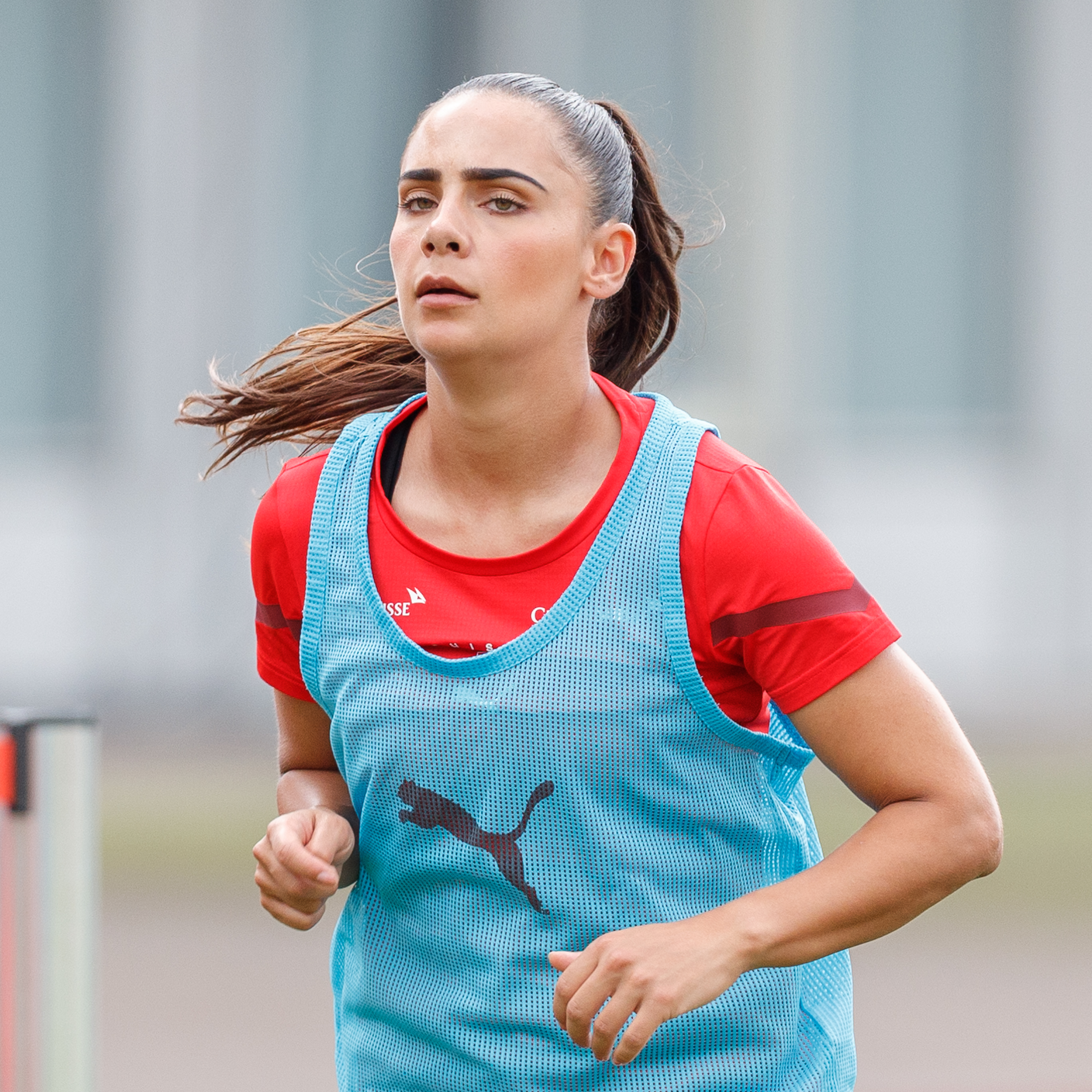
- Terchoun in 2022

Personal information
- Date of birth: 27 October 1995 (age 31)
- Place of birth: Lausanne, Switzerland
- Height: 1.62 m (5 ft 4 in)
- Positions: Midfielder; forward

Team information
- Current team: Servette FC Chênois
- Number: 11

Youth career
- 2006–2009: SC Young Fellows Juventus
- 2009–2012: FC Zürich

Senior career*
Years	Team	Apps	(Gls)
2012–2016	FC Zürich	74	(27)
2017	FC Basel	1	(0)
2017–2022	FC Zürich	36	(17)
2022–2026	Dijon	75	(11)

International career^{‡}
2011	Switzerland U16	2	(0)
2011–2012	Switzerland U17	11	(0)
2012–2014	Switzerland U19	9	(1)
2015–	Switzerland	46	(3)
- * Club domestic league appearances and goals as of 6 May 2026 ‡ National team caps and goals as of 28 October 2025

Meriame Terchoun (born 27 October 1995) is a Swiss professional footballer who plays as a midfielder or forward for Servette FC Chênois Féminin and the Switzerland national team.

Terchoun is a representative of the Swiss Association of Football Players.

== Club career ==
Terchoun played for SC YF Juventus from 2006 to 2009, then moved to FC Zürich, where she played from 2009 to 2022 with a brief hiatus. In the first half of 2017 she was in the FC Basel. With Zurich, she won the Swiss Championship eight times and the Swiss Cup seven times. During this time she also suffered three cruciate ligament tears (2016, 2017, 2019), each of which entailed long rehabilitation breaks. After her injuries, she returned to lead her club to a domestic league and cup double. She played a total of 166 competitive games for FCZ, scoring 53 goals and recording 28 assists.

In 2012/13 she made her debut in the UEFA Women's Champions League, where the team prevailed in qualifying with three wins at a tournament in Slovenia. She scored her first Champions League goal in the 8-0 win over FC Gintra.

Finally, in July 2022, she moved to Dijon FCO in the French first division.

== International career ==
=== Youth ===
Born in Switzerland, Terchoun is of Algerian descent through her father. On 22 August 2011 she was used for the first time in a game of the U-17 team, but lost with her team 0-2 against Austria. In October, she took part with the team in the first qualifying round for the 2012 UEFA Women's Under-17 Championship. With three wins, they qualified for the second round. She also made three appearances there and reached the finals in Nyon with a 3-3 win against Belgium and two 1-0 wins against Iceland and England. Here, however, in June 2012 they lost 5-1 in the semi-finals to France and the match for third place on penalties to Denmark.

In September she made her first appearances for the U-19 team in two friendlies against Denmark. This was followed by further friendly matches in March 2013 and 2014. In April 2014 she then took part with the team in the second qualifying round for the 2019 U-19 European Championship . After victories against Belarus (5-0) and hosts Portugal (2-1), they missed out on the finals with a 0-1 defeat as the fourth-best runners-up in their group.

=== Senior ===
On 22 September 2015 she played for the first time on the senior national team. She started the 4-1 friendly win against Denmark and was substituted in the second half. In the first qualifying game for Euro 2017 against Italy on 24 October 2016, she was used for the first time over 90 minutes. With a 3-0 victory in Italy, it was their first successful qualification for the European Championship. She was used in four games. During the qualification for the 2016 Olympic Games that took place in between, she was used in all three games. After the second European Championship qualifier against Italy, which was won 2-1, she had to wait 14 months for another assignment. In the last preparation game for the European Championship finals against England, she was used as a center forward, but substituted after 48 minutes when the score was 0:2 (final score 0:4). She was called up for the finals, but only for the last 11 minutes of the third group game against France came on as a left striker when the score was 1:1. The Swiss were eliminated as third in the group. In the subsequent qualification for the 2019 World Cup, she came on as a second-half substitute in the first game against Albania. She played in April 2019 in two friendlies against Poland.

She was in the squad for Euro 2022 in England but was not used. She was named to the Swiss squad for the 2023 World Cup.

On 23 June 2025, Terchoun was called up to the Switzerland squad for the UEFA Women's Euro 2025.

== Career statistics ==
=== International ===
As of match played 28 October 2025

Appearances and goals by national team and year
National team	Year	Apps	Goals
Switzerland	2015	4	1
Switzerland	2016	4	1
Switzerland	2017	3	0
Switzerland	2019	2	0
Switzerland	2021	0	0
Switzerland	2022	4	0
Switzerland	2023	14	0
Switzerland	2024	9	1
Switzerland	2025	6	0
Switzerland	2026	0	0
Total		46	3

Scores and results list Switzerland's goal tally first, score column indicates score after each Terchoun goal.

List of international goals scored by Meriame Terchoun
No.	Date	Venue	Opponent	Score	Result	Competition
1	1 December 2015	Stade de la Maladière, Neuchâtel, Switzerland	Czech Republic	5–1	5–1	2017 UEFA Women's Euro qualification
2	9 April 2016	Tissot Arena, Biel/Bienne, Switzerland	Italy	2–0	2–1	2017 UEFA Women's Euro qualification
3	16 July 2024	Stade Olympique de la Pontaise, Lausanne, Switzerland	Azerbaijan	1–0	3–0	2025 UEFA Women's Euro qualification

== Honours ==
FC Zürich

- Nationalliga A (6): 2013, 2014, 2015, 2016, 2018, 2022
- Swiss Women's Cup (5): 2013, 2015, 2016, 2018, 2022
