= Telma Ívarsdóttir =

Icelandic footballer (born 1999)

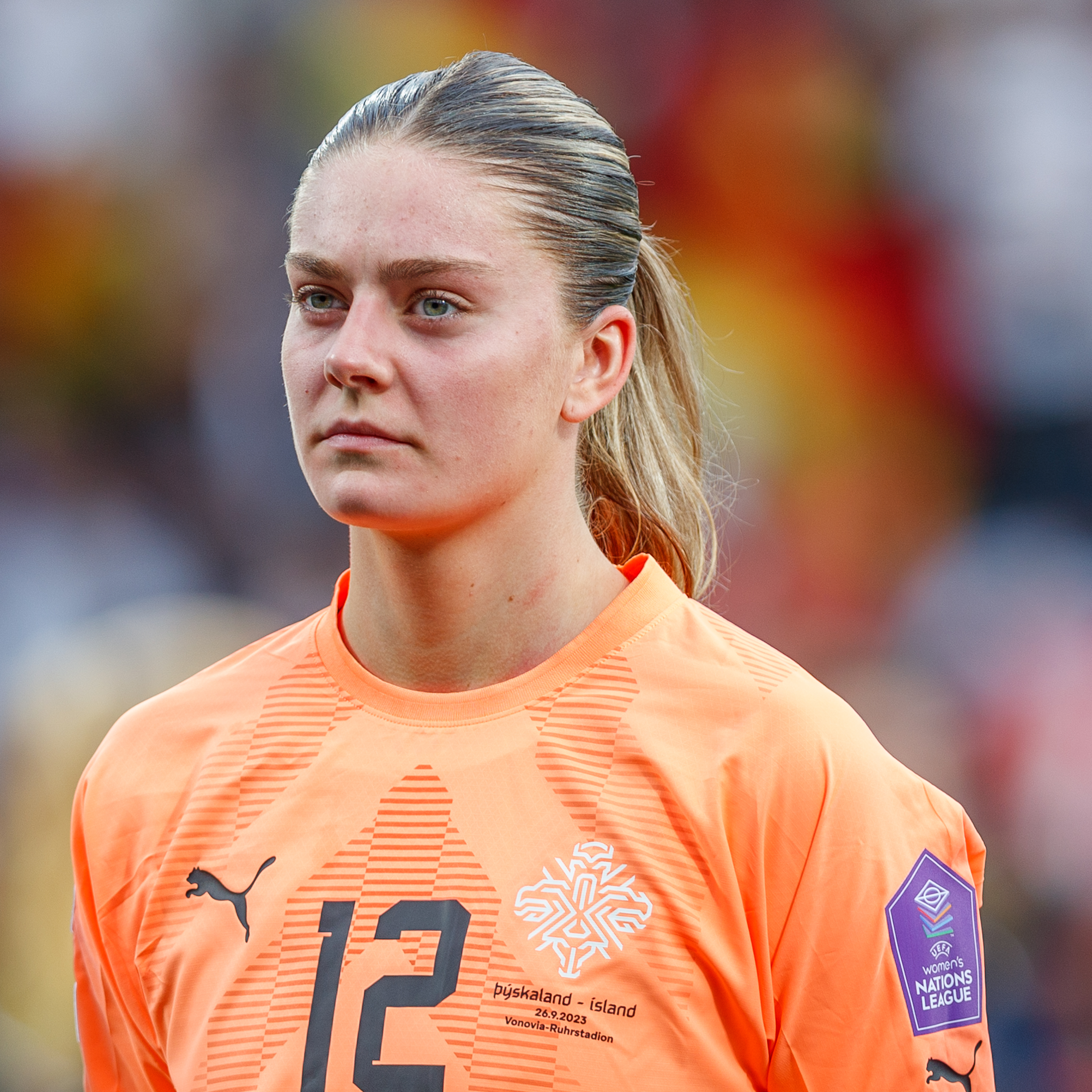
- Telma with Iceland in 2023

Personal information
- Date of birth: 30 March 1999 (age 27)
- Place of birth: Neskaupstaður, Iceland
- Height: 1.84 m (6 ft 0 in)
- Position: Goalkeeper

Team information
- Current team: Víkingur R.

Youth career
- 2014–2016: KF Fjarðabyggð

Senior career*
Years	Team	Apps	(Gls)
2016–2025	Breiðablik	70	(0)
2017	→ UMF Grindavík (loan)	2	(0)
2018–2019	→ Haukar (loan)	18	(0)
2019–2020	→ Augnablik (loan)	3	(0)
2020–2021	→ FH Hafnarfjordur (loan)	13	(0)
2025–2026	Rangers	0	(0)
2026	→ Inter Milan (loan)	0	(0)
2026–	Víkingur R.	0	(0)

International career^{‡}
2014–2015	Iceland U16	11	(0)
2015–2016	Iceland U17	6	(0)
2017–2018	Iceland U19	9	(0)
2022–	Iceland	12	(0)
- * Club domestic league appearances and goals ‡ National team caps and goals as of 24 October 2024

Telma Ívarsdóttir (born 30 March 1999) is an Icelandic professional footballer who plays as a goalkeeper for Besta deild kvenna club Vikingur Reykjavik and the Iceland national team.

== International career ==
On 13 June 2025, Telma was called up to the Iceland squad for the UEFA Women's Euro 2025.
