= Daniel dos Santos =

Daniel dos Santos may refer to:

- Daniel Dos Santos (artist) (born 1978), American artist
- Daniel Dos Santos (footballer) (born 2002), Swiss international footballer
- Daniel dos Santos (modern pentathlete) (born 1978), Brazilian modern pentathlete
- Daniel Cruz (footballer, born 2001), Brazilian footballer born Daniel dos Santos da Cruz
- Daniel Penha (born 1998), Brazilian footballer born Daniel dos Santos Penha
- Daniel Sales (footballer) (born 2006), Brazilian footballer born Daniel dos Santos Sales
- Daniel Tijolo (1982–2019), Brazilian footballer born Daniel Silva dos Santos

== See also ==
- Daniele (footballer) (born 1983), Brazilian footballer born Daniele dos Santos de Paula Batista
- Daniel Santos (disambiguation)
