= Seraina Friedli =

Swiss footballer (born 1993)

Personal information
- Full name: Seraina Friedli
- Date of birth: 20 March 1993 (age 33)
- Place of birth: Samedan, Switzerland,
- Height: 1.75 m (5 ft 9 in)
- Position: Goalkeeper

Team information
- Current team: Anderlecht

Senior career*
Years	Team	Apps	(Gls)
2012–2018	FC Zürich		
2018–2020	BSC Young Boys		
2020–2022	Florentia	8	(0)

International career
2016–	Switzerland	9	(0)
- * Club domestic league appearances and goals

Seraina Friedli (born 20 March 1993) is a Swiss footballer who plays as a goalkeeper for Italian Serie A club Sampdoria and the Switzerland national team.

== Career ==
=== Club ===
Friedli started playing football at FC Lusitanos de Samedan in 2005. In 2010, she moved to FC Thusis-Cazis. Friedli played for Swiss club FC Zürich in the Nationalliga A from 2012 to 2018. With the club, she won four national titles and three national cups. With FC Zürich, Friedli also has played six consecutive editions of the UEFA Champions League. In the summer of 2020, she moved to Italy to join San Gimignano in Serie A. She signed a one-year contract there. She made her debut in Italy against Empoli, a game she won 2-1. The 2021/22 season Friedli played for FC Aarau. For the 2022/23 season, she moved back to FC Zürich Frauen, for whom she had already played from 2012 to 2018. For the 2023/24 season she will switch to RSC Anderlecht in the first Belgian league.

=== International ===
Friedli has been called for the Switzerland national team since 2016. On 3 July 2017 Friedli was called by coach Martina Voss-Tecklenburg to represent Switzerland at the UEFA Euro 2017, but she didn't play any matches as Switzerland was eliminated in the tournament's group stage.
