= 2021–22 Grasshopper Club Zurich season =

Grasshopper Club Zurich
2021–22 season
- Chairman: Sky Sun
- Manager: Giorgio Contini
- Stadium: Letzigrund
- Swiss Super League: 8th
- Swiss Cup: Second round
- Top goalscorer: League: Kaly Sène (10); All: Kaly Sène (10)
- Highest home attendance: 16,112 vs Zürich
- Lowest home attendance: 2,550 vs Lausanne-Sport
- Average home league attendance: 5,600
- Biggest win: 4–0 vs St. Gallen
- Biggest defeat: 0–3 vs Young Boys
Home colours	Away colours

The 2021–22 Grasshopper Club Zurich season was the club's first season back in the Swiss Super League, after winning promotion from the Swiss Challenge League. The season began on 24 July 2021. Grasshoppers also participated in the Swiss Cup, losing in the second round.

== Review and events ==
=== Pre-season ===
On May 26, Grasshopper Club Zurich announced the appointment of Seyi Olofinjana as the new director of football. It was announced on June 9, 2021, that Giorgio Contini would take over the team as the new head coach, who had coached FC Lausanne-Sport until the end of last season.

Before the start of the season, major personnel changes were made:

- Portuguese goalkeeper André Moreira joined as new first goalkeeper
- Austrian defender Georg Margreitter joined to lead Grasshopper's defense
- Kosovan midfielder Amir Abrashi returned to the club as the new captain (Abrashi had played for Grasshopper from 2010 till 2015)
- Slovak midfielder Christián Herc joined from Wolverhampton
- In an unusual transfer, Japanese international Hayao Kawabe joined to augment the midfield

Furthermore, Toti's loan was extended for one year. Two further players were loaned from Wolverhampton (Bulgarian midfielder Bendegúz Bolla and Colombian forward Leonardo Campana). Campana was acquired to replace Léo Bonatini, who was injured at the end of the last season. Finally, Djibril Diani returned from his loan period at Livingston.

At the end of their loan period Oskar Buur and Connor Ronan returned to Wolverhampton, while Miguel Nóbrega returned to Benfica.

=== First round ===
The season began poorly, with a 0–2 home loss to Basel, where Campana scored an own goal. However, the team showed a lot of promise and were able to hold a 0–0 draw against Swiss champions Young Boys in the next game. This game was followed up by their first win, a 3–1 victory over Lausanne-Sport. Campana shot two goals (one by penalty) and Toti shot one.

On 17 August 2021, Noah Loosli was acquired from Lausanne-Sport to bolster the defense. Loosli had played at Grasshopper previously between 2015 and 2018 and had already been part of the youth squad. The first major highlight of the season was the derby against city rivals FC Zürich, the first one since April 2019. Grasshopper started well with a 1–0 lead in the 7th minute by Margreitter, via corner, however Zürich was able to equalize almost immediately. In a back-and-forth game, both teams had their chances at victory, but it was Zürich who managed to eke out the win in the last minute of injury time.

On 1 September 2021, Senegalese forward Kaly Sène was loaned from Basel. In his second game, he was able to secure a victory with two goals in a 3–1 win against Sion (Bolla shot the other goal). He backed up this explosive performance with another two goals in a 5–2 victory. It would be Grasshopper's most goals in one game to date this season, with Léo, Bolla, and Diani supplying the other three goals.

Grasshopper ended the first round in 5th place with 13 points (3 wins, 4 draws, 2 losses) in nine games and a 15-11 goal statistic.

On 18 September 2021, they were eliminated from the Swiss Cup, after a 0–1 loss to FC Thun in the second round of the cup.

=== Second round ===
Grasshopper were somewhat able to connect on their good performance of the first round. In the second derby of the season, it was Zürich who grabbed the explosive start, leading 2–0 after only ten minutes. Grasshopper was able to claw their way back into the game, in part thanks to a penalty conceded in the 17th minute, which Léo easily converted. Margreitter and Herc completed the turnaround. In the second half of the game Zürich was able to equalize again for the final 3–3 result. The poor start in the game in this derby was a sign of a worrying trend: in the previous game (1–3 loss to Lausanne-Sport), they had also conceded two goals in the first ten minutes of the game.

Their highest victory this season to date occurred on 5 December 2021, with a 4–0 away win against FC St. Gallen, where Sène scored a hat-trick.

A final highlight of this round would be the final game before the winter break against long time rivals FC Basel. In an exciting game, Basel was able to gain a lead in the last minute of the first half, but Grasshopper did not let this lead last long as Kawabe equalized the game soon after restart. Petar Pusic's goal in the 86th minute looked to be the winner of the game, especially since Basel were decimated due to a red card in the 89th minute, however they were once again upset in the last minute of the game with Basel's 2-2 equalizer.

Grasshoppers went into the winter break in 6th place with 23 points after 18 games, with 10 additional points (2 wins, 4 draws, 3 losses) and 17-15 goals in nine games (total 32–26).

=== Winter Break ===
During the winter break, Toti was recalled to Wolverhampton to help out with personnel shortages, while the Swiss league was still on break. However, he was able to prove himself and his loan period was ended prematurely. Campana's loan period was also ended prematurely. Meanwhile, Diani was transferred to Caen, in the French second league, and defender Aleksandar Cvetković left the club to join FC Aarau in the Swiss Challenge League. Cvetković had barely seen any play this season as his position was taken over by the new defensive lead Margreitter. Grasshoppers also acquired Japanese defender Ayumu Seko, Portuguese defender Tomás Ribeiro, and French goalkeeper Lévi Ntumba. In a curious move, Kawabe was sold to Wolverhampton, but loaned right back. Korean forward Jeong Sang-bin and Portuguese midfielder Bruno Jordão were also loaned from Wolverhampton.

=== Third round ===
Grasshoppers started absolutely catastrophically into the new year, managing just one win (2–0 away against Lausanne-Sport) and one draw (2–2 at home against Young Boys, thanks to a last minute equalizer by Bolla), after which five losses in a row saw the team dangerously close to the relegation places in the table. At the end of the round, after 27 games played, they were leading 8th place FC Luzern by only five points. In fact, with only four points in nine games, they were the second worst team of the league since the winter break (only Lausanne-Sport had a worse record). A reaction was desperately necessary, as the relegation spots were dangerously close.

The end of the third round saw them in 7th place with 27 points total and a goal difference of 42-46 (four points and 10-20 goals in nine games).

During this time, Nikola Gjorgjev and Shkelqim Demhasaj were loaned out to FC Schaffhausen and FC Winterthur (both playing in the Swiss Challenge League), respectively.

=== Fourth round ===
On 28 March 2022, Colombian forward Brayan Riascos joined the club on loan from Ukrainian FC Metalist Kharkiv for the remainder of the season. This was possible due to the Russian invasion of Ukraine, as a result of which the FIFA allowed foreign players in Ukraine to sign with clubs outside Ukraine until 30 June 2022.

The first game of the fourth round would also be the final derby of the season. Zürich, who were leading the league by a large margin, were the heavy favorites. However, Grasshoppers were able to massively improve upon the poor performances of the previous games and managed a 1–1 draw in snowy conditions. Giotto Morandi, who had only recently returned to the team from a long injury, shot the only goal for Grasshoppers in the 52nd minute. In the next game, they missed the chance to distance themselves further from pursuing Luzern, after giving up a 2–0 lead by half-time to end the game in a 2–2 draw, after receiving another last minute equalizer. On 16 April 2022, they managed to beat Servette FC in a 1–0 away victory, their first win after eight games. Léo had scored a penalty in the 10th minute. On 24 April, the upwards trend continued and they beat Lausanne-Sport 3–1, coming back from a 0–1 deficit at 10 minutes. It was their first home victory since 2 October 2021. Kawabe and an own goal turned the game around, while Bolla put the finishing touch in the last minute of regular time.

In the following three rounds, the team was unable to gain another victory, with two away draws against Basel and Lugano, where they unnecessarily gave up a lead, and a 0–1 loss against direct competitor Sion at home. As a result, before the penultimate match of the season Grasshoppers were only one point ahead of Luzern on the relegation playoff spot in the table. In this home game against St. Gallen, nothing but a victory would do. After largely dominating their guests, Grasshoppers were up 2–0 by half-time, after goals by Loosli and Morandi. After St. Gallen were able to come back into the game, with a penalty conceded by goalie Moreira, Momoh once again raised the score a minute after being subbed on. A disorganized defense and a scuffle in Grasshoppers's penalty box lead to one final goal for St. Gallen, but Grasshoppers were able to hold their lead for a 3–2 victory. Thanks to Luzern dropping points in their game against Young Boys, Grasshoppers had a lead of three points on Luzern. With an eleven-goal advantage, virtual safety of the relegation playoff spot was secured.

In the final game of the season, Grasshoppers suffered their worst defeat, a 0–3 away loss to Young Boys. However, this was only the second defeat in the fourth round, with three wins and four draws in the other games (12-9 goals).

=== Review ===
Despite 13 points in the last nine games, Grasshoppers still ended the season in eight place with equal points (40) as FC Luzern in ninth place. Thanks to a better goal difference (-4 vs. -11), they just managed to avoid having to play the relegation playoff. (Note: Curiously, if they had been in the relegation playoff, they would have had to find an alternative ground for the home leg, as Rammstein were scheduled to play in the Letzigrund that week.) Having achieved their goal to remain in the top flight, the season ultimately can be viewed as a success. With a large number of personnel changes and a new coach this was not a matter of course and Grasshoppers sadly had to struggle, especially in the second half of the season. At season's end, Coach Contini highlighted lacking efficiency in front of the opponent's goal and defensive naïveté throughout the season as the biggest deficits. The latter was particularly notable as the team often were unable to hold a lead to the end of the game and lost a total of 25 points after a lead (resulting in eight draws and 3 losses). Particularly, four goals received in injury time cost them seven points (leading to one loss and three draws) and eleven goals received in the last 15 minutes cost them 18 points (four losses, seven draws).

Fans voted Dominik Schmid as their player of the season. Kaly Sène's second of three goals in the 4–0 away win against FC St. Gallen, a stunning overhead kick after a spot-on cross from Bendegúz Bolla, was voted goal of the season.

== Squad ==
=== Players ===
As of 27 January 2022

No.	Name	Nationality	Position	Date of birth (age)	at GCZ since	Former club
Goalkeepers
1	André Moreira	(Portugal)	GK	2 December 1995 (age 30)	06/2021	Belenenses
27	Mateo Matic	(Switzerland) (Croatia)	GK	7 January 1996 (age 30)	01/2016	own youth
93	Lévi Ntumba	(France) (Democratic Republic of the Congo)	GK	12 January 2001 (age 25)	01/2022	Dijon
Defenders
3	Ermir Lenjani	(Albania) (Kosovo)	DF	5 August 1989 (age 37)	09/2020	Sion
4	Li Lei	(China)	DF	30 May 1992 (age 34)	01/2022	Beijing Guoan
5	Aleksandar Cvetković	(Serbia)	DF	4 June 1995 (age 31)	02/2018	Wohlen
14	Tomás Ribeiro	(Portugal)	DF	30 April 1999 (age 27)	01/2022	Belenenses
15	Ayumu Seko	(Japan)	DF	7 June 2000 (age 26)	01/2022	Cerezo Osaka
24	Toti	(Portugal) (Guinea-Bissau)	DF	16 January 1999 (age 27)	05/2020	Wolverhampton (on loan)
25	Nadjack	(Guinea-Bissau) (Portugal)	DF	6 February 1994 (age 32)	08/2020	Rio Ave
31	Dominik Schmid	(Switzerland)	DF	10 March 1998 (age 28)	08/2020	Basel
33	Georg Margreitter	(Austria)	DF	7 November 1988 (age 38)	07/2021	Nürnberg
34	Allan Arigoni	(Switzerland)	DF	4 November 1998 (age 28)	07/2018	own youth
41	Noah Loosli	(Switzerland)	DF	23 January 1997 (age 29)	08/2021	Lausanne-Sport
51	Florian Hoxha	(Kosovo) (Switzerland)	DF	22 February 2001 (age 25)	07/2021	own youth
77	Bendegúz Bolla	(Hungary)	DF	22 November 1999 (age 26)	07/2021	Wolverhampton (on loan)
Midfielders
6	Amir Abrashi	(Albania) (Switzerland)	MF	27 March 1990 (age 36)	06/2021	Basel
7	Nuno da Silva	(Portugal) (Switzerland)	MF	14 March 1994 (age 32)	02/2021	Thun
8	André Santos	(Portugal)	MF	2 March 1989 (age 37)	08/2020	Belenenses
10	Petar Pusic	(Switzerland) (Croatia)	MF	25 January 1999 (age 27)	02/2017	own youth
20	Bruno Jordão	(Portugal)	MF	12 October 1998 (age 28)	01/2022	Wolverhampton (on loan)
22	Giotto Morandi	(Switzerland)	MF	4 March 1999 (age 27)	06/2019	own youth
23	Nikola Gjorgjev	(North Macedonia) (Switzerland)	MF	22 August 1997 (age 29)	07/2015	own youth
28	Christián Herc	(Slovakia)	MF	30 September 1998 (age 28)	06/2021	Wolverhampton
29	Djibril Diani	(France)	MF	11 February 1998 (age 28)	06/2021	Livingston
40	Hayao Kawabe	(Japan)	MF	8 September 1995 (age 31)	01/2022	Wolverhampton (on loan)
50	Simone Stroscio	(Switzerland)	MF	20 August 2003 (age 23)	10/2021	own youth
56	Leonardo Uka	(Kosovo)	MF	26 January 2001 (age 25)	10/2021	own youth
58	Dion Kacuri	(Switzerland)	MF	11 February 2004 (age 22)	10/2021	own youth
Forwards
9	Shkelqim Demhasaj	(Kosovo) (Switzerland)	FW	19 April 1996 (age 30)	07/2020	Luzern
11	Léo Bonatini	(Brazil) (Italy)	FW	28 March 1994 (age 32)	09/2020	Wolverhampton (on loan)
17	Kaly Sène	(Senegal)	FW	28 May 2001 (age 25)	08/2021	Basel (on loan)
19	Leonardo Campana	(Ecuador) (Spain)	FW	24 July 2000 (age 26)	07/2021	Wolverhampton (on loan)
29	Jeong Sang-bin	(South Korea)	FW	1 April 2002 (age 24)	01/2022	Wolverhampton (on loan)
55	Elmin Rastoder	(Switzerland)	FW	7 October 2001 (age 25)	01/2022	own youth
58	Filipe de Carvalho	(Switzerland)	FW	1 December 2003 (age 22)	01/2022	own youth
59	Francis Momoh	(Nigeria)	FW	25 March 2001 (age 25)	08/2021	Heartland
94	Brayan Riascos	(Colombia)	FW	10 October 1994 (age 32)	03/2022	Metalist Kharkiv (on loan)

Players in italic left the club during the season.

=== Players out on loan ===
Note: Flags indicate national team as defined under FIFA eligibility rules; some limited exceptions apply. Players may hold more than one non-FIFA nationality.

No.	Pos.	Nation	Player
—	MF	CHN	Jia Boyan (at Dubrava until 30 June 2022)
9	MF	KOS	Shkelqim Demhasaj (at Winterthur until 30 June 2022)
23	MF	MKD	Nikola Gjorgjev (at Schaffhausen until 30 June 2022)
24	MF	KOS	Imran Bunjaku (at Aarau until 30 June 2022)
48	MF	GER	Robin Kalem (at Schaffhausen until 30 June 2022)

== Transfers ==
=== In ===
Date	No.	Pos	Player	Transferred from	Fee/notes	Source
30 June 2021		DF	(Switzerland) Marcin Dickenmann	(Switzerland) Wil	End of loan	
30 June 2021		DF	(Switzerland) Baba Souare	(Switzerland) Kriens	End of loan	
30 June 2021		MF	(Liberia) Allen Njie	(Croatia) Slaven Belupo	End of loan	
30 June 2021	1	GK	(Portugal) André Moreira	(Portugal) Belenenses	Transfer	
1 July 2021	28	MF	(Slovakia) Christián Herc	(England) Wolverhampton	Transfer	
1 July 2021	24	MF	(Portugal) Toti	(England) Wolverhampton	Loan	
1 July 2021	4	MF	(Albania) Amir Abrashi	(Germany) Freiburg	Transfer	
5 July 2021	33	DF	(Austria) Georg Margreitter	(Germany) Nürnberg	Transfer	
8 July 2021	79	FW	(Portugal) Vasco Paciência	(Portugal) Benfica	Loan	
8 July 2021	40	MF	(Japan) Hayao Kawabe	(Japan) Sanfrecce Hiroshima	Transfer	
16 July 2021	19	FW	(Ecuador) Leonardo Campana	(England) Wolverhampton	Loan	
17 July 2021	77	DF	(Hungary) Bendegúz Bolla	(England) Wolverhampton	Loan	
17 August 2021	41	DF	(Switzerland) Noah Loosli	(Switzerland) Lausanne	Transfer	
1 September 2021	17	FW	(Senegal) Kaly Sène	(Switzerland) Basel	Loan	
31 December 2021		MF	(Switzerland) Fabio Fehr	(Switzerland) Schaffhausen	Loan return	
5 January 2022	4	DF	(China) Li Lei	(China) Beijing Guoan	Transfer	
7 January 2022	93	GK	(France) Lévi Ntumba	(France) Dijon	Transfer	
17 January 2022	15	DF	(Japan) Ayumu Seko	(Japan) Cerezo Osaka	Transfer	
20 January 2022	40	MF	(Japan) Hayao Kawabe	(England) Wolverhampton	Loan	
27 January 2022	14	DF	(Portugal) Tomás Ribeiro	(Portugal) Belenenses	Transfer	
28 January 2022	29	FW	(South Korea) Jeong Sang-bin	(England) Wolverhampton	Loan	
31 January 2022	20	MF	(Portugal) Bruno Jordão	(England) Wolverhampton	Loan	
16 February 2022		FW	(China) Jia Boyan	(China) Shanghai Port	Transfer	
29 March 2022	94	FW	(Colombia) Brayan Riascos	(Ukraine) Metalist Kharkiv	Loan	

=== Out ===
Date	No.	Pos	Player	Transferred to	Fee/notes	Source
30 June 2021	36	GK	(Switzerland) Marvin Keller	(Switzerland) Wil		
30 June 2021	1	GK	(Switzerland) Mirko Salvi	(Switzerland) Yverdon-Sport		
30 June 2021	2	DF	(Denmark) Oskar Buur	(England) Wolverhampton	End of loan	
30 June 2021	4	DF	(Portugal) Miguel Nóbrega	(Portugal) Benfica	End of loan	
30 June 2021	14	MF	(Republic of Ireland) Connor Ronan	(England) Wolverhampton	End of loan	
30 June 2021	30	MF	(Portugal) Nuno Pina	(Italy) ChievoVerona	End of loan	
30 June 2021		DF	(Switzerland) Marcin Dickenmann	(Switzerland) Wil	Transfer	
1 July 2021		MF	(Liberia) Allen Njie	(Switzerland) Aarau	Transfer	
6 July 2021	11	FW	(Netherlands) Hicham Acheffay	(Netherlands) De Graafschap	Transfer	
8 July 2021		FW	(Switzerland) Oscar Correia	(Switzerland) Chiasso	Transfer	
15 August 2021	17	FW	(Portugal) Cristian Ponde	(Portugal) Farense	Transfer	
30 August 2021		FW	(Kosovo) Imran Bunjaku	(Switzerland) Aarau	Loan	
30 August 2021	90	MF	(Portugal) André Ribeiro	unknown		
31 August 2021	47	MF	(Switzerland) Fabio Fehr	(Switzerland) Schaffhausen	Loan	
31 August 2021	48	MF	(Germany) Robin Kalem	(Switzerland) Schaffhausen	Loan	
4 January 2022	24	DF	(Portugal) Toti	(England) Wolverhampton	End of loan	
4 January 2022	29	MF	(France) Djibril Diani	(France) Caen	Transfer	
5 January 2022	40	MF	(Japan) Hayao Kawabe	(England) Wolverhampton	Transfer	
7 January 2022		MF	(Switzerland) Fabio Fehr	(Liechtenstein) Vaduz	Loan	
12 January 2022	5	DF	(Serbia) Aleksandar Cvetković	(Switzerland) Aarau	Transfer	
20 January 2022	19	FW	(Ecuador) Leonardo Campana	(England) Wolverhampton	End of loan	
11 February 2022	23	FW	(North Macedonia) Nikola Gjorgjev	(Switzerland) Schaffhausen	Loan	
11 February 2022	9	FW	(Kosovo) Shkelqim Demhasaj	(Switzerland) Winterthur	Loan	
16 February 2022		FW	(China) Jia Boyan	(Croatia) Dubrava	Loan	
4 May 2022		MF	(Switzerland) Fabio Fehr	(Liechtenstein) Vaduz	Transfer	

== Coaching staff ==
Current coaching staff

As of July 2021

Position	Name	Since
Manager	(Switzerland) Giorgio Contini	06/2021
Assistant manager	(Italy) Erminio Piserchia	06/2021
Assistant manager (athletics)	(Austria) Florian Klausner	06/2021
Assistant manager (athletics)	(Switzerland) Philippe Hasler	07/2021
Assistant manager (goalkeeper)	(Switzerland) Jörg Stiel	06/2021

== Competitions ==
=== Overview ===
Competition	First match	Last match	Starting round	Final position	Record							
Competition	First match	Last match	Starting round	Final position	Pld	W	D	L	GF	GA	GD	Win %
Super League	24 July 2021	22 May 2022	Matchday 1	8th	36	9	13	14	54	58	−4	25.00
Swiss Cup	15 August 2021	18 September 2021	1st round	2nd round	2	1	0	1	5	1	+4	50.00
Total					38	10	13	15	59	59	+0	26.32

Last updated: 22 May 2022
Source: Soccerway

=== Swiss Super League ===
==== League table ====
Pos	Team	Pld	W	D	L	GF	GA	GD	Pts	Qualification or relegation
6	Servette	36	12	8	16	50	66	−16	44	
7	Sion	36	11	8	17	46	67	−21	41	
8	Grasshopper	36	9	13	14	54	58	−4	40	
9	Luzern (O)	36	9	13	14	52	64	−12	40	Qualification for Relegation play-offs
10	Lausanne-Sport (R)	36	4	10	22	37	76	−39	22	Relegation to Swiss Challenge League

Source: Swiss Super League
Rules for classification: 1) Points; 2) Goal difference; 3) Goals scored; 4) Head-to-head goal difference; 5) Away goals scored; 6) Draw.
(O) Play-off winners; (R) Relegated

==== Results ====
Win Draw Loss

25 July 2021 1	Grasshopper Club Zurich	0–2	Basel	Letzigrund, Zürich
16:30	Abrashi (yellow card) 22'; Diani (yellow card) 38'; Herc (yellow card) 41'; Toti (yellow card) 86'; Arigoni (yellow card) 87'	GC report	(yellow card) 5' Xhaka; (yellow card) 21' Kasami; (yellow card) 26' Petretta; 54' (o.g.) Leonardo Campana; (yellow card) 68' Quintillà; 70' Esposito	Attendance: 3,400; Referee: (Switzerland) Lukas Fähndrich

31 July 2021 2	Young Boys	0–0	Grasshopper Club Zurich	Stadion Wankdorf, Bern
20:30	Martins (yellow card) 44'	Report	(yellow card) 19' Toti; (yellow card) 50' Abrashi	Attendance: 20,628; Referee: (Switzerland) Sandro Schärer

7 August 2021 3	Grasshopper Club Zurich	3–1	Lausanne-Sport	Letzigrund, Zürich
20:30	Margreitter (yellow card) 13'; Campana 35', 49' (pen.); Toti 81'	Report	(yellow card) 32' Nanizayamo; (yellow card) 55' Suzuki; 73' Husić	Attendance: 2,550; Referee: (Switzerland) Alain Bieri

22 August 2021 4	Zürich	2–1	Grasshopper Club Zurich	Letzigrund, Zürich
16:30	Marchesano 10'; Leitner (yellow card) 15'; Kryeziu (yellow card) 49'; Aliti (yellow card) 64'; Ceesay 90+5'	Report	7' Margreitter; (yellow card) 47' (yellow-red card) 47' Abrashi; (yellow card) 49' Campana	Attendance: 14,896; Referee: (Switzerland) Urs Schnyder

29 August 2021 5	Grasshopper Club Zurich	1–1	Servette	Letzigrund, Zürich
16:30	Campana 37' (pen.); Da Silva (yellow card) 64'; Diani (yellow card) 87'	Report	(yellow card) 36' Sauthier; 20' Cognat; (yellow card) 58' Rouillet	Attendance: 4,018; Referee: (Switzerland) Sven Wolfensberger

11 September 2021 6	Luzern	1–1	Grasshopper Club Zurich	Swissporarena, Luzern
18:00	Sidler 3'; Ugrinic (yellow card) 63'; Ndiaye (yellow card) 89'; Tasar (yellow card) 90+1'	Report	51' (yellow card) 84' Herc; (yellow card) 63' Toti; (yellow card) 81' Kawabe	Attendance: 9,217; Referee: (Switzerland) Esther Staubli

23 September 2021 7	Lugano	1–1	Grasshopper Club Zurich	Cornaredo, Lugano
20:30	Margreitter 50' (o.g.); Custodio (yellow card) 90+4'	Report	90+1' Margreitter; (yellow card) 79' Abrashi; (yellow card) 90+5' Schmid	Attendance: 2,136; Referee: (Switzerland) Alessandro Dudic

26 September 2021 8	Grasshopper Club Zurich	3–1	Sion	Letzigrund, Zürich
16:30	Sène 24', 49'; Bolla 30'; Herc (yellow card) 35'	Report	90' Zuffi	Attendance: 3,785; Referee: (Switzerland) Luca Piccolo

2 October 2021 9	Grasshopper Club Zurich	5–2	St. Gallen	Letzigrund, Zürich
18:00	Sène 9', 49'; Kawabe (yellow card) 14'; Léo 22'; Pusic (yellow card) 58'; Bolla 70'; Diani 84'	Report	(yellow card) 28' (goal) 46' Lüchinger; 54' (pen.) Duah; (yellow card) 55' Guillemenot	Attendance: 5,789; Referee: (Switzerland) Fedayi San

17 October 2021 10	Lausanne-Sport	3–1	Grasshopper Club Zurich	Stade de la Tuilière, Lausanne
14:15	Amdouni 1'; Puertas 8', 80' (pen.) (yellow card) 82'; Chafik (yellow card) 23' (yellow-red card) 54'; Kukuruzović (yellow card) 70'; Suzuki (yellow card) 90+2'	Report	(yellow card) 6' Bolla; (yellow card) 11' Toti; 68' (pen.) Bonatini; (yellow card) 77' Margreitter; (yellow card) 90+5' Arigoni	Attendance: 3,811; Referee: (Switzerland) Alain Bieri

23 October 2021 11	Grasshopper Club Zurich	3–3	Zürich	Letzigrund, Zürich
20:30	Pusic (yellow card) 15'; Bonatini 17' (pen.); Margreitter 27'; Herc 35' (yellow card) 40'; Loosli (yellow card) 76'	Report	3', 66' Pollero; 10' (yellow card) 15' Džemaili; (yellow card) 13' Kryeziu	Attendance: 15,700; Referee: (Switzerland) Adrien Jaccottet

31 October 2021 12	Sion	1–3	Grasshopper Club Zurich	Stade Tourbillon, Sion
14:15	Grgić 47' (pen.); Ndoye (yellow card) 90+5'	Report	(yellow card) 27' Schmid; 32' Kawabe; 44' Sène; 78' Diani; (yellow card) 84' Margreitter; (yellow card) 89' Léo; (yellow card) 89' Hoxha	Attendance: 7,200; Referee: (Switzerland) Alessandro Dudic

7 November 2021 13	Grasshopper Club Zurich	1–1	Young Boys	Letzigrund, Zürich
18:00	Sène (yellow card) 9'; Arigoni 26'; Loosli (yellow card) 33'; Da Silva (yellow card) 33'	Report	(yellow card) 35' Sierro; (yellow card) 82' Bürgy; 90+3' Siebatcheu; (yellow card) 90+3' Garcia	Attendance: 7,736; Referee: (Switzerland) Adrien Jaccottet

21 November 2021 14	Servette	3–2	Grasshopper Club Zurich	Stade de Genève, Lancy
16:30	Kyei 32', 79'; Imeri 50'; Sasso (yellow card) 55'; Douline (yellow card) 75'	Report	(yellow card) 4' Pusic; 56' (pen.) Léo; (yellow card) 68' Lenjani; 69' Kawabe	Attendance: 5,027; Referee: (Switzerland) Adrien Jaccottet

27 November 2021 15	Grasshopper Club Zurich	0–1	Lugano	Letzigrund, Zürich
18:00	Diani (yellow card) 44'; Sène (yellow card) 81'; Loosli (yellow card) 90+4'	Report	79' Custodio; (yellow card) 87' Celar	Attendance: 3,044; Referee: (Switzerland) Lukas Fähndrich

5 December 2021 16	St. Gallen	0–4	Grasshopper Club Zurich	Kybunpark, St. Gallen
16:30	Stillhart (red card) 18'; Guillemenot (yellow card) 81'	Report	32', 43', 58' Sène; (yellow card) 82' Margreitter; 83' Kawabe	Attendance: 14,335; Referee: (Switzerland) Alessandro Dudic

12 December 2021 17	Grasshopper Club Zurich	1–1	Luzern	Letzigrund, Zürich
16:30	Léo 4'; Lenjani (yellow card) 39'; Sène (yellow card) 39'; Kawabe (yellow card) 47'	Report	(yellow card) 17' Frýdek; (yellow card) 39' Schulz; (yellow card) 74' (yellow-red card) 80' (goal) 79' Čumić	Attendance: 4,375; Referee: (Switzerland) Luca Piccolo

19 December 2021 18	Basel	2–2	Grasshopper Club Zurich	St. Jakob-Park, Basel
16:30	Stocker 45'; Kasami (yellow card) 87'; Ndoye (yellow card) 88'; Esposito (red card) 89'; Kasami 90+3'; Cabral (yellow card) 90+5'	Report	(yellow card) 50' Diani; 53' (yellow card) 57' Kawabe; (yellow card) 81' Léo; 86' Pusic; (yellow card) 89' Demhasaj; (yellow card) 90+7' Georg Margreitter	Attendance: 21,422; Referee: (Switzerland) Alain Bieri

30 January 2022 19	Sion	2–0	Grasshopper Club Zurich	Stade Tourbillon, Sion
16:30	Saintini (yellow card) 38'; Bamert 29' (yellow card) 40'; Loosli 69' (o.g.); Cavaré (yellow card) 83'	Report	(yellow card) 37' Sène; (yellow card) 64' Loosli; (red card) 84' Santos; (yellow card) 85' Arigoni	Attendance: 5,800; Referee: (Switzerland) Alain Bieri

5 February 2022 20	Grasshopper Club Zurich	1–3	Zürich	Letzigrund, Zürich
20:30	Schmid 43' (yellow card) 90+2'	Report	(yellow card) 33' Krasniqi; 47' (yellow card) 84' Ceesay; (yellow card) 64' Doumbia; 67' Tosin; 83' Gnonto	Attendance: 16,112; Referee: (Switzerland) Alain Bieri

12 February 2022 21	Lausanne-Sport	0–2	Grasshopper Club Zurich	Stade de la Tuilière, Lausanne
18:00	(yellow card) 3' (yellow-red card) 89' Trebel	Report	28' 67' Momoh; (yellow card) 38' Jordão; (yellow card) 86' Herc	Attendance: 3,025; Referee: (Switzerland) Sven Wolfensberger

20 February 2022 22	Grasshopper Club Zurich	2–2	Young Boys	Letzigrund, Zürich
16:30	Herc (yellow card) 35'; Margreitter (yellow card) 45+1' (goal) 60'; Jordão (yellow card) 79'; Ribeiro (yellow card) 82'; Bolla 90+5'	Report	53' (pen.) Pefok; (yellow card) 55' Fernandes; (yellow card) 72' Zesiger; 77' Mambimbi; (yellow card) 86' Niasso	Attendance: 6,273; Referee: Luca Piccolo

27 February 2022 23	St. Gallen	2–0	Grasshopper Club Zurich	Kybunpark, St. Gallen
14:15	Von Moos 7'; (yellow card) 58' Guillemenot; 66' Duah; (yellow card) 87' Toma	Report	(yellow card) 20' Abrashi; (yellow card) 63' Jordão; (yellow card) 90+1' Bolla	Attendance: 18,861; Referee: Stefan Horisberger

3 March 2022 24	Grasshopper Club Zurich	1–2	Lugano	Letzigrund, Zürich
20:30	Lenjani (yellow card) 56'; Sène 77'	Report	17' 71' (yellow card) 90+4' Celar; (yellow card) 90' Maric	Attendance: 3,039; Referee: Sven Wolfensberger

6 March 2022 25	Grasshopper Club Zurich	2–4	Servette	Letzigrund, Zürich
16:30	Momoh (yellow card) 7'; Herc (yellow card) 35' (goal) 41'; Kawabe 53'	Report	(yellow card) 21' Bedia; 36' (pen.) Imeri; 44' Schalk; 78' 90+2' Rodelin	Attendance: 3,885; Referee: Fedayi San

13 March 2022 26	Luzern	1–0	Grasshopper Club Zurich	Swissporarena, Luzern
16:30	Léo 2' (o.g.); Schulz (yellow card) 39'	Report	(yellow card) 1' Kawabe; (yellow card) 71' Arigoni	Attendance: 11,711; Referee: Luca Piccolo

20 March 2022 27	Grasshopper Club Zurich	2–4	Basel	Letzigrund, Zürich
16:30	Sène 24' (yellow card) 59'; Kawabe 38' da Silva (yellow card) 66'	Report	16' Millar; 44' Lang; 52' 79' Szalai; (yellow card) 88' Stocker	Attendance: 5,894; Referee: Urs Schnyder

2 April 2022 28	Zürich	1–1	Grasshopper	Letzigrund, Zürich
17:30	Boranijasevic (yellow card) 11'; Džemaili (yellow card) 58'; Aliti 82'; Coric (yellow card) 58'	Report	52' Morandi; (yellow card) 58' Sène; (yellow card) 58' Schmid; (yellow card) 79' Kacuri; (yellow card) 81' Loosli	Attendance: 15,327; Referee: Sandro Schärer

9 April 2022 29	Grasshopper	2–2	Luzern	Letzigrund, Zürich
20:30	Arigoni 13'; Momoh 29'; Bolla (yellow card) 33'; Loosli (yellow card) 39' (yellow-red card) 76'; Lenjani (yellow card) 55'; Sène (yellow card) 88'	Report	(yellow card) 34' Jashari; 63' Abubakar; (yellow card) 71' Kvasina; (yellow card) 87' Burch; 90' Sidler	Attendance: 5,049; Referee: Fedayi San

16 April 2022 30	Servette	0–1	Grasshopper	Stade de Genève, Geneva
20:30	Cespedes (yellow card) 19'; Behrami (yellow card) 28'; Imeri (yellow card) 51'; Bauer (yellow card) 90+4'	Report	10' (pen.) Léo; (yellow card) 16' Arigoni; (yellow card) 46' Lei; (yellow card) 73' Momoh; (yellow card) 90+1' Jordão	Attendance: 5,012; Referee: Lukas Fähndrich

24 April 2022 31	Grasshopper	3–1	Lausanne-Sport	Letzigrund, Zürich
16:30	Hayao Kawabe 37' (yellow card) 58'; Zohouri 72' (o.g.); Bolla 90+1'	Report	5' Kukuruzovic; (yellow card) 11' Coyle; (yellow card) 35' Alakouch; (yellow card) 57' Husic; (yellow card) 59' Trebel	Attendance: 3,503; Referee: Luca Piccolo

30 April 2022 32	Lugano	1–1	Grasshopper	Cornaredo, Lugano
18:00	Lavanchy (yellow card) 39'; Sabbatini 75'; Daprelà (yellow card) 87'	Report	58' Léo	Attendance: 2,584; Referee: Esther Staubli

7 May 2022 33	Grasshopper	0–1	Sion	Letzigrund, Zürich
14:15	Arigoni (yellow card) 20'; Seko (yellow card) 51'	Report	70' Stojilkovic; (yellow card) 90+5' Cipriano	Attendance: 4,414; Referee: Urs Schnyder

12 May 2022 34	Basel	1–1	Grasshopper	St. Jakob-Park, Basel
20:30	Andy Pelmard (yellow card) 41'; Esposito 84'	Report	(yellow card) 10' Bolla; 50' (yellow card) 59' Riascos; (yellow card) 75' (yellow-red card) 77' Herc; (yellow card) 90+1' Moreira	Attendance: 19,228; Referee: Stefan Horisberger

19 May 2022 35	Grasshopper	3–2	St. Gallen	Letzigrund, Zürich
20:30	Loosli 18'; Morandi 45+1'; Moreira (yellow card) 59'; Momoh 81'; Abrashi (yellow card) 86'; Sène (yellow card) 90+5'	Report	(yellow card) 5' Besio; (yellow card) 42' Stillhart; 60' (pen.) Quintillà; 87' Duah	Attendance: 5,234; Referee: Luca Piccolo

22 May 2022 36	Young Boys	3–0	Grasshopper	Stadion Wankdorf, Bern
16:30	Fassnacht 7' (yellow card) 8'; Fernandes (yellow card) 35'; Maceiras (yellow card) 38'; Kanga 77'; Monteiro 89'	Report	(yellow card) 2' Jordão; (yellow card) 90+1' Seko	Attendance: 31,120; Referee: Fedayi San

=== Swiss Cup ===
Kickoff times are in CET

Win Draw Loss

15 August 2021 1st Round	FC Widnau (Canton of St. Gallen)	0–5	(Canton of Zurich) Grasshopper Club Zurich	Widnau
14:00		Report	5' Demhasaj; 53' Momoh; 57' Gjorgjev; 59' Santos; 73' Da Silva	Stadium: Aegeten; Attendance: 2,600; Referee: (Switzerland) Nico Gianforte

18 September 2021 2nd Round	Thun (Canton of Bern)	1–0	(Canton of Zurich) Grasshopper Club Zurich	Thun
20:15	Sutter 59'	Report		Stadium: Stockhorn Arena; Attendance: 2,663; Referee: (Switzerland) Adrien Jaccottet

=== Pre-season and friendlies ===
Win Draw Loss

25 June 2021	Grasshopper Club Zurich (Switzerland)	2–4	(Switzerland) Schaffhausen	Niederhasli, Switzerland
18:00 CEST (UTC+2)	Herc 70', 77'	Report	5' Hamdiu; 10' Pollero; 54', 89' Del Toro	Stadium: GC/Campus

2 July 2021	Wil (Switzerland)	1–2	(Switzerland) Grasshopper Club Zurich	Wil, Switzerland
14:00 CEST (UTC+2)	Sílvio 82'	Report	42' Demhasaj; 61' Gjorgjev	Stadium: Sportpark Bergholz

6 July 2021	Basel (Switzerland)	1–0	(Switzerland) Grasshopper Club Zurich	Münchenstein, Switzerland
16:30 CEST (UTC+2)	Kasami 4'; Quintillà (yellow card) 28'	Report		Stadium: Youth Campus Basel; Attendance: 270; Referee: (Switzerland) Adrien Jaccottet

10 July 2021	Grasshopper Club Zurich (Switzerland)	0–2	(Switzerland) Luzern	Niederhasli, Switzerland
14:00 CEST (UTC+2)		Report	32' (pen.) 45' Schulz	Stadium: GC/Campus; Attendance: 500; Referee: Mirel Turkes

17 July 2021	Grasshopper Club Zurich (Switzerland)	2–3	(Switzerland) Thun	Niederhasli, Switzerland
15:00 CEST (UTC+2)	André Ribeiro 94'; Gjorgjev 115'	Report	19' Karlen; 53' Schmidt; 77' Wyssen	Stadium: GC/Campus; Attendance: 300

3 September 2021	Grasshopper Club Zurich (Switzerland)	5–2	(Austria) Dornbirn	Niederhasli, Switzerland
16:00 CEST (UTC+2)	Herc 38'; Diani 55'; Léo 73'; Lenjani 79'; Da Silva 90'	Report	18' Katnik; 50' (pen.) Kasaï	Stadium: GC/Campus

6 October 2021 3-Städte-Turnier	FC Uster (Switzerland)	1–5	(Switzerland) Grasshopper Club Zurich	Uster, Switzerland
20:00 CEST (UTC+2)	Cenerazzo	Report	Léo; Campana; Sène; Pusic	Stadium: Buchholz

6 October 2021 3-Städte-Turnier	Grasshopper Club Zurich (Switzerland)	2–0	(Switzerland) Winterthur	Uster, Switzerland
21:00 CEST (UTC+2)	Uka; Demhasaj	Report		Stadium: Buchholz

11 November 2021	Grasshopper Club Zurich (Switzerland)	3–1	(Liechtenstein) Vaduz	Niederhasli, Switzerland
14:00 CET (UTC+2)	Campana 17'; Da Silva 41'; Stroscio 83'	Report	4' Djokic	Stadium: GC/Campus; Attendance: 0

11 January 2022	Wil (Switzerland)	2–2	(Switzerland) Grasshopper Club Zurich	Wil, Switzerland
14:30 CET (UTC+2)	Sauter 25'; Zumberi 30'	Report	50' Gjorgjev; 90' Momoh	Stadium: Sportpark Bergholz; Attendance: 0

15 January 2022	Young Boys (Switzerland)	5–2	(Switzerland) Grasshopper Club Zurich	Bern, Switzerland
13:00 CET (UTC+2)	Aebischer 2'; Fassnacht 36'; Lauper 41'; Mambimbi 62'; Rieder 80'	Report	27' Demhasaj; 46' De Carvalho	Stadium: Stadion Wankdorf; Attendance: 2,000; Referee: (Switzerland) Stefan Horisberger

21 January 2022	Grasshopper Club Zurich (Switzerland)	1–1	(Switzerland) Winterthur	Niederhasli, Switzerland
15:00 CET (UTC+2)	Schmid 53'	Report	64' Tushi	Stadium: GC/Campus; Attendance: 0

25 March 2022	Grasshopper Club Zurich (Switzerland)	1–1	(Switzerland) Aarau	Niederhasli, Switzerland
14:00 CET (UTC+2)	Morandi 38'	Report	66' Almeida	Stadium: GC/Campus; Attendance: 150; Referee: Anojen Kanagasingam

== Statistics ==
=== Goalscorers ===
Rank	No.	Pos	Nat	Name	League	Cup	Total
1	17	FW	(Senegal)	Kaly Sène	10	0	10
2	40	MF	(Japan)	Hayao Kawabe	7	0	7
2	11	FW	(Brazil)	Léo Bonatini	7	0	7
4	59	FW	(Nigeria)	Francis Momoh	4	1	5
5	33	DF	(Austria)	Georg Margreitter	4	0	4
5	77	DF	(Hungary)	Bendegúz Bolla	4	0	4
7	19	FW	(Ecuador)	Leonardo Campana	3	0	3
7	28	MF	(Slovakia)	Christián Herc	3	0	3
7	22	MF	(Switzerland)	Giotto Morandi	2	0	2
9	29	MF	(France)	Djibril Diani	2	0	2
9	34	DF	(Switzerland)	Allan Arigoni	2	0	2
10	7	MF	(Portugal)	Nuno da Silva	0	1	1
10	8	MF	(Portugal)	André Santos	0	1	1
10	9	FW	(Kosovo)	Shkelqim Demhasaj	0	1	1
10	10	MF	(Switzerland)	Petar Pusic	1	0	1
10	23	MF	(North Macedonia)	Nikola Gjorgjev	0	1	1
10	24	DF	(Portugal)	Toti	1	0	1
10	31	DF	(Switzerland)	Dominik Schmid	1	0	1
10	41	DF	(Switzerland)	Noah Loosli	1	0	1
10	94	FW	(Colombia)	Brayan Riascos	1	0	1
Own goals					5	0	1
Totals					54	5	59

Last updated: 11 April 2022
Source: GCZ Statistiken

Players in italic left the club during the season.

=== Assists ===
Rank	No.	Pos	Nat	Name	League	Cup	Total
1	3	DF	(Albania)	Ermir Lenjani	8	0	8
2	31	DF	(Switzerland)	Dominik Schmid	6	1	7
3	28	MF	(Slovakia)	Christián Herc	5	0	5
4	11	FW	(Brazil)	Léo Bonatini	4	0	4
4	17	FW	(Senegal)	Kaly Sène	4	0	4
6	10	MF	(Switzerland)	Petar Pusic	3	0	3
6	59	FW	(Nigeria)	Francis Momoh	3	0	3
6	77	DF	(Hungary)	Bendegúz Bolla	3	0	3
6	40	MF	(Japan)	Hayao Kawabe	3	0	3
6	34	DF	(Switzerland)	Allan Arigoni	3	0	3
11	4	DF	(China)	Li Lei	1	0	1
11	6	MF	(Albania)	Amir Abrashi	1	0	1
11	7	MF	(Portugal)	Nuno da Silva	0	1	1
11	9	FW	(Kosovo)	Shkelqim Demhasaj	1	0	1
11	20	MF	(Portugal)	Bruno Jordão	1	0	1
11	22	MF	(Switzerland)	Giotto Morandi	1	0	1
11	29	MF	(France)	Djibril Diani	0	1	1
Totals					45	3	48

Last updated: 11 April 2022
Source: GCZ Statistiken

Players in italic left the club during the season.
