= List of Swiss football transfers winter 2021–22 =

This is a list of Swiss football transfers for the 2021–22 winter transfer window. Only transfers featuring Swiss Super League are listed.

== Swiss Super League ==
Note: Flags indicate national team as has been defined under FIFA eligibility rules. Players may hold more than one non-FIFA nationality.

=== Young Boys ===
In:

No.	Pos.	Nation	Player
1	GK	(Switzerland) SUI	Anthony Racioppi (from (France) Dijon)
7	MF	(Hungary) HUN	Kevin Varga (on loan from (Turkey) Kasımpaşa)
20	MF	(Senegal) SEN	Cheikh Niasse (from (France) Lille)

Out:

No.	Pos.	Nation	Player
7	MF	(Switzerland) SUI	Marvin Spielmann (to Lausanne)
11	MF	(Switzerland) SUI	Alexandre Jankewitz (on loan to St. Gallen)
14	DF	(Switzerland) SUI	Nicolas Bürgy (on loan to (Denmark) Viborg)
18	FW	(Cameroon) CMR	Jean-Pierre Nsame (on loan to (Italy) Venezia)
20	MF	(Switzerland) SUI	Michel Aebischer (on loan to (Italy) Bologna)
23	GK	(Switzerland) SUI	Nicholas Ammeter (loan return to Aarau)
29	FW	(Switzerland) SUI	Yannick Toure (on loan to Wil)
35	MF	(Luxembourg) LUX	Christopher Martins (on loan to (Russia) Spartak Moscow)
36	DF	(Switzerland) SUI	Silvan Hefti (to (Italy) Genoa)
—	FW	(Switzerland) SUI	Shkelqim Vladi (on loan to Aarau, previously on loan at Yverdon)

=== Basel ===
In:

No.	Pos.	Nation	Player
3	DF	(Germany) GER	Noah Katterbach (on loan from (Germany) 1. FC Köln)
18	MF	(Ghana) GHA	Emmanuel Essiam (from (Ghana) Berekum Chelsea)
76	DF	(Switzerland) SUI	Albian Hajdari (on loan from (Italy) Juventus B)
99	FW	(Russia) RUS	Fyodor Chalov (on loan from (Russia) CSKA Moscow)

Out:

No.	Pos.	Nation	Player
3	DF	(Portugal) POR	Gonçalo Cardoso (loan return to (England) West Ham United)
4	DF	(Switzerland) SUI	Eray Cömert (to (Spain) Valencia)
8	MF	(Spain) ESP	Jordi Quintillà (to St. Gallen)
10	FW	(Brazil) BRA	Arthur Cabral (to (Italy) Fiorentina)
11	FW	(Angola) ANG	Afimico Pululu (to (Germany) Greuther Fürth)
24	FW	(Switzerland) SUI	Tician Tushi (on loan to Winterthur)
29	MF	(Switzerland) SUI	Adrian Durrer (to Lugano)
71	FW	(Switzerland) SUI	Carmine Chiappetta (on loan to Winterthur)
99	MF	(Kosovo) KOS	Edon Zhegrova (to (France) Lille)
—	MF	(Switzerland) SUI	Yannick Marchand (on loan to Neuchâtel Xamax, previously on loan at (France) Grenoble)
—	FW	(Switzerland) SUI	Julian Von Moos (to St. Gallen, previously on loan at (Netherlands) Vitesse)

=== Servette ===
In:

No.	Pos.	Nation	Player
26	DF	(Austria) AUT	Moritz Bauer (from (Russia) Ufa)
29	FW	(Ivory Coast) CIV	Chris Bedia (from (Belgium) Charleroi)

Out:

No.	Pos.	Nation	Player
2	DF	(Switzerland) SUI	Anthony Sauthier (on loan to Yverdon)
25	FW	(France) FRA	Grejohn Kyei (to (France) Clermont)

=== Lugano ===
In:

No.	Pos.	Nation	Player
8	MF	(Switzerland) SUI	Adrian Durrer (from Basel)
11	MF	(Switzerland) SUI	Maren Haile-Selassie (from Neuchâtel Xamax)
17	DF	(Argentina) ARG	Milton Valenzuela (from (United States) Columbus Crew)
27	DF	(Switzerland) SUI	Kevin Rüegg (on loan from (Italy) Hellas Verona)
31	FW	(Argentina) ARG	Ignacio Aliseda (from (United States) Chicago Fire)
—	FW	(Italy) ITA	Alessandro Casciato (from Rapperswil-Jona)

Out:

No.	Pos.	Nation	Player
8	FW	(Switzerland) SUI	Christopher Lungoyi (loan return to (Italy) Juventus B)
9	FW	(Brazil) BRA	Luis Phelipe (loan return to (Austria) Red Bull Salzburg)
11	MF	(France) FRA	Kévin Monzialo (on loan to (Austria) St. Pölten)
17	FW	(Portugal) POR	Asumah Abubakar (to Luzern)

=== Luzern ===
In:

No.	Pos.	Nation	Player
2	DF	(Tunisia) TUN	Mohamed Dräger (on loan from (England) Nottingham Forest)
5	DF	(Albania) ALB	Denis Simani (from Vaduz)
14	DF	(Switzerland) SUI	Serkan Izmirlioglu (from Wil)
21	FW	(Portugal) POR	Asumah Abubakar (from Lugano)

Out:

No.	Pos.	Nation	Player
22	FW	(Cameroon) CMR	Yvan Alounga (on loan to Schaffhausen)
28	DF	(Germany) GER	Holger Badstuber (free agent)
29	DF	(Austria) AUT	Patrick Farkas (to (Austria) Hartberg)
66	DF	(Kosovo) KOS	David Domgjoni (to (Poland) Termalica)

=== Lausanne ===
In:

No.	Pos.	Nation	Player
13	MF	(Switzerland) SUI	Nassim Zoukit (from Étoile Carouge)
29	DF	(France) FRA	Maxime Poundjé (free agent)
30	MF	(France) FRA	Adrien Trebel (on loan from (Belgium) Anderlecht)
33	MF	(Switzerland) SUI	Marvin Spielmann (from Young Boys)
90	FW	(Uruguay) URU	Rodrigo Pollero (on loan from Schaffhausen, previously on loan at Zürich)

Out:

No.	Pos.	Nation	Player
10	MF	(Spain) ESP	Cameron Puertas (to (Belgium) Union SG)
37	DF	(France) FRA	Mickaël Nanizayamo (on loan to (Austria) SCR Altach)
66	MF	(Switzerland) SUI	Gabriel Barès (to (France) Montpellier)

=== St. Gallen ===
In:

No.	Pos.	Nation	Player
8	MF	(Spain) ESP	Jordi Quintillà (from Basel)
14	DF	(Croatia) CRO	Matej Maglica (on loan from (Germany) VfB Stuttgart)
19	FW	(Switzerland) SUI	Julian Von Moos (from Basel, previously on loan at (Netherlands) Vitesse)
28	FW	(Switzerland) SUI	Christopher Lungoyi (on loan from (Italy) Juventus B, previously on loan at Lugano)
45	MF	(Switzerland) SUI	Alexandre Jankewitz (on loan from Young Boys)
72	MF	(Switzerland) SUI	Bastien Toma (on loan from (Belgium) Genk)

Out:

No.	Pos.	Nation	Player
8	MF	(Mali) MLI	Ousmane Diakité (loan return to (Austria) Salzburg)
20	FW	(France) FRA	Élie Youan (on loan to (Belgium) Mechelen)
25	FW	(Senegal) SEN	Boubacar Traorè (to (Ukraine) Metalist Kharkiv)
26	MF	(Switzerland) SUI	Tim Staubli (on loan to Vaduz)

=== Zürich ===
In:

No.	Pos.	Nation	Player
28	DF	(Estonia) EST	Karol Mets (from (Bulgaria) CSKA Sofia)

Out:

No.	Pos.	Nation	Player
8	MF	(Switzerland) SUI	Vasilije Janjičić (to (Slovenia) Celje)
11	FW	(Switzerland) SUI	Henri Koide (on loan to Neuchâtel Xamax)
29	FW	(Uruguay) URU	Rodrigo Pollero (loan return to Schaffhausen)

=== Sion ===
In:

No.	Pos.	Nation	Player
28	DF	(Switzerland) SUI	Gaetano Berardi (free agent)
32	DF	(Switzerland) SUI	Loris Benito (free agent)

Out:

No.	Pos.	Nation	Player
3	DF	(Sweden) SWE	Mattias Andersson (to (Denmark) Randers)
15	MF	(Japan) JPN	Yamato Wakatsuki (loan return to (Japan) Shonan Bellmare)
29	FW	(France) FRA	Jared Khasa (on loan to (France) Pau)
68	DF	(France) FRA	Jean Ruiz (on loan to (France) Boulogne)

=== Grasshoppers ===
In:

No.	Pos.	Nation	Player
4	DF	(China) CHN	Li Lei (from (China) Beijing Guoan)
14	DF	(Portugal) POR	Tomás Ribeiro (from (Portugal) Belenenses SAD)
15	DF	(Japan) JPN	Ayumu Seko (from (Japan) Cerezo Osaka)
20	MF	(Portugal) POR	Bruno Jordão (on loan from (England) Wolves)
29	FW	(South Korea) KOR	Jung Sang-bin (on loan from (England) Wolves)
40	MF	(Japan) JPN	Hayao Kawabe (on loan from (England) Wolves)
93	GK	(France) FRA	Lévi Ntumba (free agent)

Out:

No.	Pos.	Nation	Player
5	DF	(Serbia) SRB	Aleksandar Cvetković (to Aarau)
9	FW	(Kosovo) KOS	Shkelqim Demhasaj (on loan to Winterthur)
19	FW	(Ecuador) ECU	Leonardo Campana (loan return to (England) Wolves)
23	MF	(North Macedonia) MKD	Nikola Gjorgjev (on loan to Schaffhausen)
24	DF	(Portugal) POR	Toti (loan return to (England) Wolves)
29	MF	(France) FRA	Djibril Diani (to (France) Caen)
40	MF	(Japan) JPN	Hayao Kawabe (to (England) Wolves)
—	MF	(Switzerland) SUI	Fabio Fehr (on loan to Vaduz, previously on loan at Schaffhausen)

== See also ==
- 2021–22 Swiss Super League
