= 2022–23 FC Aarau season =

FC Aarau
2022–23 season
- Chairman: Philipp Bonorand
- Manager: Boris Smiljanić
- Stadium: Stadion Brügglifeld
- Swiss Challenge League: 5th
- Swiss Cup: Round 2
- Top goalscorer: League: Shkelqim Vladi (8); All: Shkelqim Vladi (8)

The 2022–23 season is the 121st season in the history of FC Aarau and their eighth consecutive season in the second division. The club are participating in Swiss Challenge League and the Swiss Cup. The season covers the period from 1 July 2022 to 30 June 2023.

== Players ==
As of 2 September 2022

Note: Flags indicate national team as defined under FIFA eligibility rules; some limited exceptions apply. Players may hold more than one non-FIFA nationality.

No.	Pos.	Nation	Player
1	GK	SUI	Simon Enzler
2	DF	SUI	Marco Thaler
3	DF	SUI	Bastien Conus
6	MF	LBR	Allen Njie
7	MF	SUI	Nuno da Silva
8	MF	SUI	Olivier Jäckle (vice-captain)
9	FW	KOS	Shkelqim Vladi
10	FW	ALB	Shkëlzen Gashi (captain)
11	MF	KOS	Milot Avdyli
13	MF	POR	Ivo Candé
14	DF	SUI	Jan Kronig
17	MF	SUI	Valon Fazliu

No.	Pos.	Nation	Player
19	MF	SUI	Silvan Schwegler
20	MF	MKD	Nikola Gjorgjev
21	MF	SUI	Mischa Eberhard (on loan from Young Boys)
22	DF	ALB	Arijan Qollaku
23	MF	KOS	Imran Bunjaku
26	FW	POR	Mickaël Almeida
27	FW	SUI	Andrin Hunziker (on loan from Basel)
28	GK	SUI	Joschua Neuenschwander
29	DF	SUI	Noël Wetz
30	MF	GER	Varol Tasar (on loan from Luzern)
41	MF	SUI	Samuel Krasniqi
55	DF	SRB	Aleksandar Cvetković

=== Out on loan ===
Note: Flags indicate national team as defined under FIFA eligibility rules; some limited exceptions apply. Players may hold more than one non-FIFA nationality.

No.	Pos.	Nation	Player
—	GK	SUI	Anthony von Arx (at Cham until 30 June 2023)
—	GK	SUI	Marvin Hübel (at Baden until 30 June 2023)
—	GK	SUI	Joël Bonorand (at Cham until 30 June 2023)
—	DF	SUI	Flavio Caserta (at YF Juventus until 30 June 2023)

No.	Pos.	Nation	Player
—	DF	SUI	Binjamin Hasani (at Baden until 30 June 2023)
—	DF	SUI	Fabrice Suter (at Kriens until 30 June 2023)
—	MF	SUI	Nik Dubler (at Kriens until 30 June 2023)

== Pre-season and friendlies ==
Win Draw Loss Fixtures

29 June 2022 Friendly	Waldhof Mannheim (Germany)	2–0	(Switzerland) Aarau	Forst
18:00 CEST (UTC+2)				Stadium: Waldseestadion

8 July 2022 Friendly	Schötz (Switzerland)	1–3	(Switzerland) Aarau	Switzerland
CEST (UTC+2)

23 September 2022 Friendly	Luzern (Switzerland)	6–0	(Switzerland) Aarau	Switzerland
CET (UTC+1)

8 January 2023 Friendly	Chindia Târgoviște (Romania)	2–1	(Switzerland) Aarau	Belek, Turkey
15:00 CET (UTC+1)				Stadium: Calista Sports Center - Field A

13 January 2023 Friendly	Turan Tovuz (Azerbaijan)	1–0	(Switzerland) Aarau	Belek, Turkey
13:30 CET (UTC+1)				Stadium: Calista Sports Center - Field A

21 January 2023 Friendly	Austria Lustenau	v	(Switzerland) Aarau	Lustenau, Austria
--:-- CET (UTC+1)				Stadium: Reichshofstadion

== Competitions ==
=== Overall record ===
Competition	First match	Last match	Starting round	Final position	Record							
Competition	First match	Last match	Starting round	Final position	Pld	W	D	L	GF	GA	GD	Win %
Swiss Challenge League	15 July 2022	May 2023	Matchday 1		18	6	7	5	32	34	−2	33.33
Swiss Cup	20 August 2022	18 September 2022	Round 1	Round 2	2	1	0	1	9	3	+6	50.00
Total					20	7	7	6	41	37	+4	35.00

Last updated: 27 November 2022
Source: Soccerway

=== Swiss Challenge League ===
==== League table ====
Pos	Team	Pld	W	D	L	GF	GA	GD	Pts	Promotion or qualification
2	Lausanne (P)	36	17	10	9	58	43	+15	61	Promotion to Swiss Super League
3	Lausanne-Ouchy (Note: Lausanne-Ouchy were deducted 3 points on 1 November 2022, due to license violations. This decision was overturned following the team's appeal on 22 November 2022.) (O, P)	36	17	9	10	70	53	+17	60	Qualification for the promotion play-off
4	Aarau	36	15	12	9	63	57	+6	57	
5	Wil	36	16	8	12	62	52	+10	56	
6	Thun	36	12	13	11	62	55	+7	49	

Source: Swiss Challenge League
Rules for classification: 1) Points; 2) Goal difference; 3) Goals scored; 4) Head-to-head goal difference; 5) Away goals scored; 6) Draw.
(O) Play-off winners; (P) Promoted

==== Results summary ====
Overall								Home						Away					
Pld	W	D	L	GF	GA	GD	Pts	W	D	L	GF	GA	GD	W	D	L	GF	GA	GD
0	0	0	0	0	0	0	0	0	0	0	0	0	0	0	0	0	0	0	0

Last updated: November 2022.
Source: Swiss Challenge League

==== Results by round ====
Round	1
Ground	
Result	
Position	

Updated to match(es) played on November 2022. Source: Swiss Challenge League
A = Away; H = Home; W = Win; D = Draw; L = Loss

==== Matches ====
The league fixtures were announced on 17 June 2022.

1	Aarau	v	Aarau
--:-- CEST (UTC+2)			Stadium: Stadion Brügglifeld
