= Shkelqim Demhasaj =

Kosovan footballer (born 1996)

Personal information
- Date of birth: 19 April 1996 (age 30)
- Place of birth: Schaffhausen, Switzerland
- Height: 1.91 m (6 ft 3 in)
- Position: Forward

Team information
- Current team: Yverdon-Sport
- Number: 9

Youth career
- 2007–2013: Schaffhausen

Senior career*
Years	Team	Apps	(Gls)
2013–2017	Schaffhausen	58	(21)
2017–2020	Luzern	78	(10)
2020–2023	Grasshoppers	57	(14)
2022	→ Winterthur (loan)	8	(2)
2022	→ Grasshoppers II	6	(8)
2023–2024	Aarau	35	(8)
2024–2026	Neuchâtel Xamax	67	(37)
2026–	Yverdon-Sport	6	(1)

International career^{‡}
2016	Switzerland U20	2	(0)
2017	Switzerland U21	2	(0)
2018	Kosovo	1	(0)
- * Club domestic league appearances and goals as of 20 September 2026 ‡ National team caps and goals as of 17 November 2018

Shkelqim Demhasaj (born 19 April 1996) is a professional footballer who plays as a forward for Swiss Challenge League club Yverdon-Sport. Born in Switzerland, he has represented the Kosovo national team.

== Club career ==
=== Luzern ===
On 22 June 2017, Demhasaj joined Swiss Super League side Luzern, on a three-year contract. On 20 July 2017, he made his debut with Luzern in the second qualifying round of 2017–18 UEFA Europa League against the Croatian side Osijek after coming on as a substitute at 77th minute in place of Cedric Itten.

=== Grasshoppers ===
On 2 July 2020, Demhasaj joined Swiss Challenge League side Grasshoppers, on a three-year contract. During the 2020–21 Challenge League season, he scored ten goals for Grasshopper and notably helped the club achieve promotion to the Super League.

==== Loan to Winterthur ====
In the new season, Demhasaj saw notably less play time, however, and also suffered a dearth of goals scored. As a result, he was loaned out to FC Winterthur on 11 February 2022. He scored in his first game for Winterthur four minutes after coming on in the 61st minute, in a 4–0 win over FC Wil. He also supplied the assist for the final goal of the game. After suffering another injury, he was out of commission between March and May, returning only for the last two games of the season. He scored a second goal for Winterthur in the final game of the season, converting a penalty for the final 5-0 victory over SC Kriens, a victory that was instrumental in securing promotion for Winterthur. It was Demhasaj's second promotion in two years.

==== Return to Grasshoppers ====
Demhasaj returned to Grasshoppers for the next season. He still did not see much more playtime following his return, however, beginning the start of the season with the reserve squad instead. Due to Grasshoppers's personnel issues in the offense, due to injuries, he was nominated to the starting lineup again on 18 March 2023, in an away win against FC Sion, but failed to make an impact in just under 70 minutes of play. On 25 April 2023, he was again nominated to the starting lineup against BSC Young Boys and this time showed a MVP worthy performance, with one goal and one assist in the 4–1 victory. As a result he was nominated as Man of the Match by bluewin. He scored two more goals in the final games of the season. His opening goal in the 3rd minute of a 2–2 draw against FC St. Gallen was voted as Goal of the Season, by the Grasshoppers fans.

=== FC Aarau ===
Despite the improved impact towards the end of the season, Demhasaj's expiring contract was not renewed following the season's end and his departure was announced on 18 June 2023. Later that month, Swiss Challenge League side FC Aarau announced him as their new forward, for the next two seasons. At Aarau, he will rejoin former teammates Nikola Gjorgjev, Aleksandar Cvetković, and Nuno da Silva with whom he had helped Grasshoppers to promotion in 2021.

=== Neuchâtel Xamax ===
On 27 June 2024, Demhasaj transferred to Aarau's Challenge League opponents Neuchâtel Xamax for an undisclosed fee.

== International career ==
On 12 November 2018, Demhasaj received an urgent call-up from Kosovo for the 2018–19 UEFA Nations League matches against Malta and Azerbaijan to replace the injured Bersant Celina. On 17 November 2018, he made his debut with Kosovo in a UEFA Nations League match against Malta after coming on as a substitute at 84th minute in place of Vedat Muriqi.

== Personal life ==
Demhasaj was born in Schaffhausen, Switzerland to Kosovo Albanian parents from Donji Crnobreg, a village near Deçan. He holds Kosovan and Swiss passports.

== Career statistics ==
=== Club ===
As of match played 30 June 2023

Appearances and goals by club, season and competition
Club	Season	League			Cup		Continental		Total	
Club	Season	Division	Apps	Goals	Apps	Goals	Apps	Goals	Apps	Goals
Schaffhausen	2013–14	Swiss Challenge League	5	1	0	0	—		5	1
Schaffhausen	2014–15	Swiss Challenge League	10	1	1	0	—		11	1
Schaffhausen	2015–16	Swiss Challenge League	9	2	1	0	—		10	2
Schaffhausen	2016–17	Swiss Challenge League	34	17	3	1	—		37	18
Schaffhausen	Total		58	21	5	1	0	0	63	22
Luzern	2017–18	Swiss Super League	32	6	4	2	1 (Note: Appearance(s) in the UEFA Europa League)	0	37	8
Luzern	2018–19	Swiss Super League	31	4	5	3	2	1	38	8
Luzern	2019–20	Swiss Super League	15	0	1	1	4	0	20	1
Luzern	Total		78	10	10	6	7	1	95	17
Grasshoppers	2020–21	Swiss Challenge League	31	10	3	1	—		34	11
Grasshoppers	2021–22	Swiss Super League	13	0	2	1	—		8	1
Grasshoppers	2022–23	Swiss Super League	13	3	2	1	—		15	4
Grasshoppers	Total		57	13	7	3	0	0	64	16
Winterthur (loan)	2021–22	Swiss Challenge League	8	2	—		—		8	2
Grasshoppers II	2022–23	1. Liga Group 3	5	7	—		—		5	7
Aarau	2023–24	Swiss Challenge League	0	0	0	0	—		0	0
Career total			206	53	22	10	7	1	235	64

=== International ===
As of 17 November 2018

Appearances and goals by national team and year
National team	Year	Apps	Goals
Kosovo	2018	1	0
Total		1	0
