= 2021–22 Wolverhampton Wanderers F.C. season =

English football club season

Wolverhampton Wanderers F.C.
2021–22 season
- Chairman: Jeff Shi
- Head coach: Bruno Lage
- Stadium: Molineux
- Premier League: 10th
- FA Cup: Fourth round
- EFL Cup: Third round
- Top goalscorer: League: Raúl Jiménez (6); All: Raúl Jiménez; Daniel Podence (6 each)
- Highest home attendance: 31,842 vs Leeds United (18 March 2022, Premier League)
- Lowest home attendance: 27,004 vs Sheffield United (9 January 2022, FA Cup)
- Average home league attendance: 30,725
Home colours	Away colours	Third colours

The 2021–22 season was the 144th in the history of Wolverhampton Wanderers and the 4th consecutive in the Premier League. The club also competed in the FA Cup and the EFL Cup.

This was the first season under former Benfica manager Bruno Lage, who was appointed on 9 June 2021 following the departure of Nuno Espírito Santo by mutual consent at the end of the previous season.

== Pre-season friendlies ==
The club's pre-season schedule included friendlies against Crewe Alexandra, Real Betis, Stoke City, Coventry City and Celta Vigo, in addition to two friendlies behind closed doors against Forest Green Rovers and Al Shabab. On July 12, Wanderers confirmed a sixth pre-season match, against Las Palmas.

10 July 2021 Friendly	Wolverhampton Wanderers	3–0	Forest Green Rovers	Wolverhampton
				Stadium: Molineux

17 July 2021 Friendly	Crewe Alexandra	1–0	Wolverhampton Wanderers	Crewe
15:15 BST	Long 53'	Report		Stadium: Gresty Road; Referee: Andy Haines

24 July 2021 Friendly	Real Betis	0–1	Wolverhampton Wanderers	La Línea, Spain
19:00 CEST		Report	Cutrone 83'	Stadium: Estadio Municipal; Referee: Ruiz Aguilera

26 July 2021 Friendly	Las Palmas	3–2	Wolverhampton Wanderers	Marbella, Spain
19:00 CEST	García 39'; Peñaranda 45'; Jesé 72'	Report	Hoever 53'; Gibbs-White 83'	Stadium: Marbella Football Center; Referee: Expósito Amarillo

27 July 2021 Friendly	Al Shabab	1–2	Wolverhampton Wanderers	Marbella, Spain
19:00 CEST	Al-Harbi 27'	Report	Campbell 63'; Jiménez 88' (pen.)	Stadium: Marbella Football Center; Referee: Expósito Amarillo

31 July 2021 Friendly	Stoke City	1–1	Wolverhampton Wanderers	Stoke-on-Trent
13:00 BST	Batth 27'	Report	Jiménez 30'	Stadium: bet365 Stadium; Attendance: 7,894 (2,384 away)

1 August 2021 Friendly	Coventry City	1–2	Wolverhampton Wanderers	Coventry
13:00 BST	Waghorn 57' (pen.)	Report	Silva 7'; Neves 55'	Stadium: Coventry Building Society Arena; Attendance: 8,373 (1,846 away); Referee: Oliver Langford

7 August 2021 Friendly	Wolverhampton Wanderers	0–1	Celta Vigo	Wolverhampton
12:45 BST		Report	Aspas 31' (pen.)	Stadium: Molineux; Attendance: 16,391; Referee: Jonathan Moss

== Competitions ==
=== Premier League ===
==== League table ====
Pos	Team	Pld	W	D	L	GF	GA	GD	Pts
8	Leicester City	38	14	10	14	62	59	+3	52
9	Brighton & Hove Albion	38	12	15	11	42	44	−2	51
10	Wolverhampton Wanderers	38	15	6	17	38	43	−5	51
11	Newcastle United	38	13	10	15	44	62	−18	49
12	Crystal Palace	38	11	15	12	50	46	+4	48

Source: Premier League
Rules for classification: 1) Points; 2) Goal difference; 3) Goals scored; 4) If the champions, relegated teams or qualified teams for UEFA competitions cannot be determined by rules 1 to 3, rules 4.1 to 4.3 are applied – 4.1) Points gained in head-to-head record between such teams; 4.2) Away goals scored in head-to-head record between such teams; 4.3) Play-offs

==== Results summary ====
Overall								Home						Away					
Pld	W	D	L	GF	GA	GD	Pts	W	D	L	GF	GA	GD	W	D	L	GF	GA	GD
38	15	6	17	38	43	−5	51	7	3	9	20	25	−5	8	3	8	18	18	0

==== Results by matchday ====
Matchday	1	2	3	4	5	6	7	8	9	10	11	12	13	14	15	16	17	18	19	20	21	22	23	24	25	26	27	28	29	30	31	32	33	34	35	36	37	38
Ground	A	H	H	A	H	A	H	A	A	H	A	H	A	H	H	A	A	H	H	A	A	H	A	H	A	H	A	H	A	H	H	A	H	A	H	A	H	A
Result	L	L	L	W	L	W	W	W	D	W	L	W	D	D	L	L	W	D	W	L	W	W	W	L	W	W	L	L	W	L	W	L	L	L	D	L	D	L
Position	13	16	18	13	16	14	12	10	11	7	8	6	6	8	8	9	8	8	8	8	8	8	8	8	7	7	8	8	7	8	8	8	8	8	8	8	8	10

Source: Statto.com
A = Away; H = Home; W = Win; D = Draw; L = Loss

==== Matches ====
The provisional fixture list was released on 16 June 2021, but was subject to change in the event of matches being selected for television coverage or police concerns.

14 August 2021 1	Leicester City	1–0	Wolverhampton Wanderers	Leicester
15:00 BST	Vardy 41', (yellow card) 90+1'	Report	Marçal (yellow card) 59'; Hoever (yellow card) 76'	Stadium: King Power Stadium; Attendance: 31,983 (3,305 away fans); Referee: Craig Pawson

22 August 2021 2	Wolverhampton Wanderers	0–1	Tottenham Hotspur	Wolverhampton
14:00 BST	Jiménez (yellow card) 57'	Report	Alli 10' (pen.); Tanganga (yellow card) 38'; Skipp (yellow card) 44'; Højbjerg (yellow card) 85'; Kane (yellow card) 90+1'	Stadium: Molineux; Attendance: 30,368 (2,845 away fans); Referee: Stuart Attwell

29 August 2021 3	Wolverhampton Wanderers	0–1	Manchester United	Wolverhampton
16:30 BST	Neves (yellow card) 81'; Saïss (yellow card) 84'; Gibbs-White (yellow card) 90+2'	Report	Fernandes (yellow card) 44'; Greenwood 80'; Fred (yellow card) 84'; Pogba (yellow card) 90+3'; Dalot (yellow card) 90+3'	Stadium: Molineux; Attendance: 30,621 (2,959 away fans); Referee: Mike Dean

11 September 2021 4	Watford	0–2	Wolverhampton Wanderers	Watford
15:00 BST	Etebo (yellow card) 13'; Rose (yellow card) 67'; Dennis (yellow card) 68'	Report	Marçal (yellow card) 68'; Sierralta 74' (o.g.); Hwang 83'; Jiménez (yellow card) 90+2'; Kilman (yellow card) 90+5'	Stadium: Vicarage Road; Attendance: 20,019 (2,292 away fans); Referee: Peter Bankes

18 September 2021 5	Wolverhampton Wanderers	0–2	Brentford	Wolverhampton
12:30 BST	Sá (yellow card) 27'; Saïss (yellow card) 38'; Neves (yellow card) 58'; Coady (yellow card) 90+6'	Report	Toney 28' (pen.); Mbeumo 34'; Henry (yellow card) 46'; Baptiste (yellow card) 59' (yellow-red card) 64'; Jansson (yellow card) 74'	Stadium: Molineux; Attendance: 29,724 (2,327 away fans); Referee: Darren England

26 September 2021 6	Southampton	0–1	Wolverhampton Wanderers	Southampton
14:00 BST		Report	Jiménez 61'	Stadium: St Mary's Stadium; Attendance: 28,002 (3,345 away fans); Referee: Andrew Madley

2 October 2021 7	Wolverhampton Wanderers	2–1	Newcastle United	Wolverhampton
15:00 BST	Hwang 20', 58'	Report	Hendrick 41'; Clark (yellow card) 56'; Manquillo (yellow card) 60'	Stadium: Molineux; Attendance: 30,483 (2,963 away fans); Referee: Graham Scott

16 October 2021 8	Aston Villa	2–3	Wolverhampton Wanderers	Aston
15:00 BST	Ings 48'; Mings (yellow card) 61'; McGinn 68'; Watkins (yellow card) 81'	Report	Neves (yellow card) 52', (goal) 90+5'; Saïss 80'; Coady 85'; Dendoncker (yellow card) 88'	Stadium: Villa Park; Attendance: 41,951 (3,012 away fans); Referee: Michael Oliver

23 October 2021 9	Leeds United	1–1	Wolverhampton Wanderers	Leeds
15:00 BST	Shackleton (yellow card) 65'; Rodrigo 90+4' (pen.), (yellow card) 90+4'	Report	Moutinho (yellow card) 5'; Hwang 10'; Kilman (yellow card) 50'; Saïss (yellow card) 53'	Stadium: Elland Road; Attendance: 36,475 (2,913 away fans); Referee: Robert Jones

1 November 2021 10	Wolverhampton Wanderers	2–1	Everton	Wolverhampton
20:00 GMT	Kilman 28'; Jiménez 32'; Aït-Nouri (yellow card) 90+2'	Report	Iwobi 66'; Coleman (yellow card) 90+2'	Stadium: Molineux; Attendance: 30,617 (2,962 away fans); Referee: Martin Atkinson

6 November 2021 11	Crystal Palace	2–0	Wolverhampton Wanderers	Selhurst
15:00 GMT	Guéhi (yellow card) 37'; Zaha 61'; Gallagher 78'; Olise (yellow card) 81'	Report	Moutinho (yellow card) 9'	Stadium: Selhurst Park; Attendance: 24,390 (2,866 away fans); Referee: Graham Scott

20 November 2021 12	Wolverhampton Wanderers	1–0	West Ham United	Wolverhampton
15:00 GMT	Neves (yellow card) 54'; Jiménez 58'	Report	Rice (yellow card) 86'	Stadium: Molineux; Attendance: 30,667 (2,968 away fans); Referee: Mike Dean

27 November 2021 13	Norwich City	0–0	Wolverhampton Wanderers	Norwich
15:00 GMT	Gilmour (yellow card) 26'; Gibson (yellow card) 50'	Report	Neves (yellow card) 31'; Semedo (yellow card) 53'	Stadium: Carrow Road; Attendance: 26,911 (2,669 away fans); Referee: Simon Hooper

1 December 2021 14	Wolverhampton Wanderers	0–0	Burnley	Wolverhampton
19:30 GMT	Hwang (yellow card) 18'; Kilman (yellow card) 86'	Report	Mee (yellow card) 7'; Lowton (yellow card) 18'; Rodriguez (yellow card) 64'	Stadium: Molineux; Attendance: 30,328 (908 away fans); Referee: John Brooks

4 December 2021 15	Wolverhampton Wanderers	0–1	Liverpool	Wolverhampton
15:00 GMT	Dendoncker (yellow card) 26'; Jiménez (yellow card) 88'	Report	Fabinho (yellow card) 62'; Robertson (yellow card) 66'; Origi 90+4'	Stadium: Molineux; Attendance: 30,729 (2,970 away fans); Referee: Chris Kavanagh

11 December 2021 16	Manchester City	1–0	Wolverhampton Wanderers	Manchester
12:30 GMT	Dias (yellow card) 40'; Rodri (yellow card) 43'; Sterling 66' (pen.); Cancelo (yellow card) 81'	Report	Jiménez (yellow card) 45+1' (yellow-red card) 45+2'; Neves (yellow card) 45+3'; Dendoncker (yellow card) 78'	Stadium: City of Manchester Stadium; Attendance: 52,613 (3,000 away fans); Referee: Jon Moss

15 December 2021 17	Brighton & Hove Albion	0–1	Wolverhampton Wanderers	Falmer
19:30 GMT	Bissouma (yellow card) 69'; Burn (yellow card) 91'	Report	Saïss 45+1'	Stadium: Falmer Stadium; Attendance: 30,362 (3,046 away fans); Referee: Tony Harrington

19 December 2021 18	Wolverhampton Wanderers	0–0	Chelsea	Wolverhampton
14:00 GMT		Report	Chalobah (yellow card) 30'; Rüdiger (yellow card) 33'	Stadium: Molineux; Attendance: 30,631 (2,893 away fans); Referee: David Coote

3 January 2022 21	Manchester United	0–1	Wolverhampton Wanderers	Manchester
17:30 GMT	McTominay (yellow card) 48'; Shaw (yellow card) 56'; Matić (yellow card) 74'	Report	Moutinho 82'; Sá (yellow card) 90+4'	Stadium: Old Trafford; Attendance: 73,045 (3,100 away fans); Referee: Mike Dean

15 January 2022 22	Wolverhampton Wanderers	3–1	Southampton	Wolverhampton
15:00 GMT	Jiménez 37' (pen.), (yellow card) 62'; Podence (yellow card) 43'; Coady 59'; Traoré 90+1'	Report	Lyanco (yellow card) 58'; Ward-Prowse 84', (yellow card) 86'; Salisu (yellow card) 87'	Stadium: Molineux; Attendance: 30,057 (2,535 away fans); Referee: Michael Salisbury

22 January 2022 23	Brentford	1–2	Wolverhampton Wanderers	Brentford
15:00 GMT	Toney 71'; Jansson (yellow card) 75'; Nørgaard (yellow card) 83'	Report	Moutinho 48'; Neves (yellow card) 60', (goal) 78'; Toti (yellow card) 70'; Sá (yellow card) 90+1'	Stadium: Brentford Community Stadium; Attendance: 16,982 (1,723 away fans); Referee: Peter Bankes

10 February 2022 24	Wolverhampton Wanderers	0–1	Arsenal	Wolverhampton
19:45 GMT	Saïss (yellow card) 36'; Neves (yellow card) 60'	Report	Gabriel 25', (yellow card) 61'; Partey (yellow card) 33'; Xhaka (yellow card) 45+1'; Martinelli (yellow card) 69' (yellow-red card) 69'	Stadium: Molineux; Attendance: 31,523 (2,970 away fans); Referee: Michael Oliver

13 February 2022 25	Tottenham Hotspur	0–2	Wolverhampton Wanderers	Tottenham
14:00 GMT	Moura (yellow card) 68'; Kulusevski (yellow card) 71'; Bentancur (yellow card) 90+4'	Report	Jiménez 7'; Dendoncker 18'; Aït-Nouri (yellow card) 66'	Stadium: Tottenham Hotspur Stadium; Attendance: 56,452 (3,038 away fans); Referee: Kevin Friend

20 February 2022 26	Wolverhampton Wanderers	2–1	Leicester City	Wolverhampton
16:30 GMT	Neves 9', (yellow card) 76'; Aït-Nouri (yellow card) 31'; Podence (yellow card) 38', (goal) 67'; Dendoncker (yellow card) 70'	Report	Söyüncü (yellow card) 29'; Albrighton (yellow card) 36'; Lookman (yellow card) 38', (goal) 41'; Pereira (yellow card) 90+2'	Stadium: Molineux; Attendance: 31,497 (2,953 away fans); Referee: Craig Pawson

24 February 2022 20	Arsenal	2–1	Wolverhampton Wanderers	Holloway
19:45 GMT	Saka (yellow card) 38'; Pépé 82'; Sá 90+5' (o.g.)	Report	Hwang 10'; Jiménez (yellow card) 89'	Stadium: Emirates Stadium; Attendance: 59,888 (3,003 away fans); Referee: Martin Atkinson
Note: The match, originally scheduled for 28 December 2021, was postponed due to a lack of available players in the Wolves squad as a result of numerous injuries and positive COVID-19 test results.

27 February 2022 27	West Ham United	1–0	Wolverhampton Wanderers	Stratford
14:00 GMT	Souček 59'; Antonio (yellow card) 82'	Report		Stadium: London Stadium; Attendance: 59,946 (3,001 away fans); Referee: Anthony Taylor

5 March 2022 28	Wolverhampton Wanderers	0–2	Crystal Palace	Wolverhampton
15:00 GMT		Report	Mateta 19'; Zaha 34' (pen.); Gallagher (yellow card) 53'; Guaita (yellow card) 88'; Hughes (yellow card) 90'	Stadium: Molineux; Attendance: 31,395 (2,764 away fans); Referee: Andrew Madley

10 March 2022 19	Wolverhampton Wanderers	4–0	Watford	Wolverhampton
19:30 GMT	Jiménez 13'; Hernández 18' (o.g.); Podence 21'; Aït-Nouri (yellow card) 35'; Saïss (yellow card) 59'; Neves 85'	Report	Louza (yellow card) 19'; Samir (yellow card) 40'	Stadium: Molineux; Attendance: 29,658 (813 away fans); Referee: Darren England
Note: The match, originally scheduled for 26 December 2021, was postponed due to a lack of available players in the Watford squad as a result of numerous injuries and positive COVID-19 test results.

13 March 2022 29	Everton	0–1	Wolverhampton Wanderers	Walton
14:00 GMT	Holgate (yellow card) 69'; Kenny (yellow card) 75' (yellow-red card) 78'; Godfrey (yellow card) 84'	Report	Coady 49', (yellow card) 64'	Stadium: Goodison Park; Attendance: 39,112 (2,972 away fans); Referee: Michael Oliver

18 March 2022 30	Wolverhampton Wanderers	2–3	Leeds United	Wolverhampton
20:00 GMT	Boly (yellow card) 7'; Jonny 26'; Jiménez (yellow card) 43' (yellow-red card) 53'; Trincão 45+11'	Report	Struijk (yellow card) 45+10'; Harrison 63'; Rodrigo 66', (yellow card) 67'; Cresswell (yellow card) 74'; Ayling 90+1'; Forshaw (yellow card) 90+4'	Stadium: Molineux; Attendance: 31,842 (2,965 away fans); Referee: Kevin Friend

2 April 2022 31	Wolverhampton Wanderers	2–1	Aston Villa	Wolverhampton
15:00 BST	Jonny 7', (yellow card) 66'; Coady (yellow card) 25'; Young 36' (o.g.); Marçal (yellow card) 90+2'; Neto (yellow card) 90+3'	Report	McGinn (yellow card) 38'; Watkins 86' (pen.); Young (yellow card) 90+3'; Konsa (yellow card) 90+4'	Stadium: Molineux; Attendance: 31,012 (2,969 away fans); Referee: Darren England

8 April 2022 32	Newcastle United	1–0	Wolverhampton Wanderers	Newcastle upon Tyne
20:00 BST	Schär (yellow card) 56'; Wood 72' (pen.)	Report	Moutinho (yellow card) 87'	Stadium: St James' Park; Attendance: 52,164 (3,199 away fans); Referee: Peter Bankes

24 April 2022 34	Burnley	1–0	Wolverhampton Wanderers	Burnley
14:00 BST	Vydra (yellow card) 33', (goal) 62'; Taylor (yellow card) 77'; Barnes (yellow card) 90+4'	Report	Neto (yellow card) 90+4'	Stadium: Turf Moor; Attendance: 19,671 (2,354 away fans); Referee: Anthony Taylor

30 April 2022 35	Wolverhampton Wanderers	0–3	Brighton & Hove Albion	Wolverhampton
15:00 BST	Coady (yellow card) 21'; Hwang (yellow card) 72'	Report	Mac Allister (penalty missed) 33', 42' (pen.); Cucurella (yellow card) 60'; Trossard 70'; Bissouma 86'	Stadium: Molineux; Attendance: 31,243 (1,850 away fans); Referee: Simon Hooper

7 May 2022 36	Chelsea	2–2	Wolverhampton Wanderers	Fulham
15:00 BST	Azpilicueta (yellow card) 27'; Lukaku 56' (pen.), 58'	Report	Saïss (yellow card) 36'; Neto (yellow card) 45+2'; Moutinho (yellow card) 51'; Trincão 79'; Coady 90+7'	Stadium: Stamford Bridge; Attendance: 32,190 (3,054 away fans); Referee: Peter Bankes

11 May 2022 33	Wolverhampton Wanderers	1–5	Manchester City	Wolverhampton
20:15 BST	Dendoncker 11'	Report	De Bruyne 7', 16', 24', 60', (yellow card) 78'; Sterling 84'	Stadium: Molineux; Attendance: 31,076 (2,970 away fans); Referee: Martin Atkinson

15 May 2022 37	Wolverhampton Wanderers	1–1	Norwich City	Wolverhampton
14:00 BST	Aït-Nouri 55'	Report	Normann (yellow card) 19'; Pukki 37'; Giannoulis (yellow card) 47'; Aarons (yellow card) 79'	Stadium: Molineux; Attendance: 31,219 (723 away fans); Referee: Tony Harrington

22 May 2022 38	Liverpool	3–1	Wolverhampton Wanderers	Liverpool
16:00 BST	Mané 24'; Matip (yellow card) 46'; Salah 84'; Robertson 89'	Report	Neto 3'	Stadium: Anfield; Attendance: 53,097 (2,936 away fans); Referee: Anthony Taylor

=== FA Cup ===
As a Premier League team, Wolves entered the competition at the third round stage, and were drawn at home to Sheffield United.

9 January 2022 Third round	Wolverhampton Wanderers	3–0	Sheffield United	Wolverhampton
14:00 GMT	Podence 14', 80'; Semedo 73'	Report	Basham (yellow card) 61'; Freeman (yellow card) 84'	Stadium: Molineux; Attendance: 27,004 (1,789 away fans); Referee: Paul Tierney

5 February 2022 Fourth round	Wolverhampton Wanderers	0–1	Norwich City	Wolverhampton
15:00 GMT	Neves (yellow card) 90+3'	Report	Hanley (yellow card) 16'; Lees-Melou (yellow card) 29'; McLean 45+1', (yellow card) 50'; Williams (yellow card) 79'; Normann (yellow card) 81'; McGovern (yellow card) 90+3'	Stadium: Molineux; Attendance: 30,736 (1,813 away fans); Referee: David Coote

=== EFL Cup ===
As a Premier League team not involved in European competition, Wolves entered the competition at the second round stage in August 2021 and were drawn away to Nottingham Forest and in the third round against Tottenham Hotspur at home.

24 August 2021 Second round	Nottingham Forest	0–4	Wolverhampton Wanderers	Nottingham
20:00 BST		Report	Saïss 58'; Podence 60'; Trincão 86'; Gibbs-White 88'	Stadium: The City Ground; Attendance: 10,769 (3,169 away fans); Referee: Andy Davies

22 September 2021 Third round	Wolverhampton Wanderers	2–2 (2–3 p)	Tottenham Hotspur	Wolverhampton
19:45 BST	Silva (yellow card) 16'; Dendoncker 38'; Neves (yellow card) 47'; Podence 58'	Report	Ndombele 14', (yellow card) 83'; Kane 23'	Stadium: Molineux; Attendance: 28,798 (2,833 away fans); Referee: Peter Bankes
	Penalties
	Hwang (penalty scored); Moutinho (penalty scored); Neves (penalty missed); Dendoncker (penalty missed); Coady (penalty missed)		(penalty scored) Kane; (penalty scored) Reguilón; (penalty scored) Gil; (penalty missed) Højbjerg

=== EFL Trophy ===
Wolves were one of the sixteen teams from outside the bottom two divisions of the Football League to be invited to field their academy team in the competition due to it holding Category 1 academy status. They were drawn into Group C in the Northern section.
Note: In group stage matches which were level at the end of 90 minutes, a penalty shoot-out was held, with the winner earning a bonus point.

31 August 2021	Wigan Athletic	0–0 (2–4 p)	Wolverhampton Wanderers U21	Wigan
19:00 BST	Bayliss (yellow card) 34'; Humphrys (yellow card) 90+1'	Report	Campbell (yellow card) 73'	Stadium: DW Stadium; Attendance: 1,240; Referee: Marc Edwards
	Penalties
	Humprhys (penalty scored); Massey (penalty scored); Aasgaard (penalty missed); Edwards (penalty missed)		(penalty scored) Carty; (penalty scored) Campbell; (penalty scored) Cundle; (penalty missed) Richards; (penalty scored) Kandola

5 October 2021	Shrewsbury Town	3–1	Wolverhampton Wanderers U21	Shrewsbury
19:00 BST	Lloyd (yellow card) 45+2', (goal) 78'; Bloxham 72'; Pyke 90+2'	Report	Hesketh 31'	Stadium: New Meadow; Attendance: 1,334; Referee: Lee Swabey

9 November 2021	Crewe Alexandra	3–0	Wolverhampton Wanderers U21	Crewe
19:00 GMT	Mandron 12', 36'; Robbins 79'	Report		Stadium: Gresty Road; Attendance: 598; Referee: Martin Coy

== Players ==
=== Statistics ===
Key:
‡ On loan from another club * First appearance(s) for the club

- # = Squad number
- Pos = Playing position
- P = Number of games played
- G = Number of goals scored
- GK = Goalkeeper
- DF = Defender
- MF = Midfielder
- FW = Forward
- = Yellow cards
- = Red cards
- † Permanent player left club during the season
- ¤ Loaned to another club for part or all of season

Correct as of 22 May 2022. Starting appearances are listed first, followed by substitute appearances in parentheses where applicable.

No.	Pos	Name	P	G	P	G	P	G	P	G	A yellow card	A red card	Notes
No.	Pos	Name	League		FA Cup		League Cup		Total		Discipline		Notes
1	GK	(Portugal) José Sá	37	0	0	0	0	0	37	0	3	0	
2	DF	(Netherlands) Ki-Jana Hoever	4(4)	0	0	0	2	0	6(4)	0	1	0	
3	DF	(France) Rayan Aït-Nouri	20(3)	1	2	0	2	0	24(3)	1	4	0	
5	DF	(Brazil) Marçal	17(1)	0	1	0	0	0	18(1)	0	3	0	
6	MF	(Portugal) Bruno Jordão ¤	0	0	0(1)	0	0	0	0(1)	0	0	0	
7	FW	(Portugal) Pedro Neto	5(8)	1	0	0	0	0	5(8)	1	3	0	
8	MF	(Portugal) Rúben Neves	31(2)	4	2	0	1	0	34(2)	4	11	0	(Note: Neves was suspended vs Burnley (h) due to accumulating five yellow cards.)
9	FW	(Mexico) Raúl Jiménez	30(4)	6	0(2)	0	0	0	29(6)	6	6	2	(Note: Jiménez was suspended vs Brighton (a) due to receiving a second yellow card vs Manchester City (a).)
10	FW	(Portugal) Daniel Podence	14(11)	2	2	2	2	2	17(11)	6	2	0	
11	FW	(Portugal) Francisco Trincão ‡	16(12)	2	0(1)	0	0(1)	1	16(14)	3	0	0	
13	GK	(England) Louie Moulden ¤	0	0	0	0	0	0	0	0	0	0	
14	DF	(Colombia) Yerson Mosquera	0	0	0	0	1	0	1	0	0	0	
15	DF	(Ivory Coast) Willy Boly	10	0	0	0	1	0	11	0	1	0	
16	DF	(England) Conor Coady	38	4	2	0	1(1)	0	41(1)	4	4	0	
17	FW	(Portugal) Fábio Silva	6(16)	0	2	0	2	0	10(16)	0	1	0	
18	MF	(England) Morgan Gibbs-White ¤	0(2)	0	0	0	1	1	1(2)	1	1	0	
19	DF	(Spain) Jonny	9(3)	2	0	0	0	0	9(3)	2	1	0	
20	FW	(Portugal) Chiquinho	1(7)	0	0(1)	0	0	0	1(8)	0	0	0	
21	GK	(England) John Ruddy	1(1)	0	2	0	2	0	5(1)	0	0	0	
22	DF	(Portugal) Nélson Semedo	25	0	2	1	0(1)	0	26(1)	1	1	0	
23	DF	(England) Max Kilman	30	1	2	0	2	0	34	1	3	0	
24	DF	(Portugal) Toti Gomes ¤	4	0	1	0	0	0	5	0	1	0	
26	FW	(South Korea) Hwang Hee-chan ‡	20(10)	5	0	0	1	0	21(10)	5	2	0	
27	MF	(Morocco) Romain Saïss	31	2	0	0	1	1	32	3	6	0	
28	MF	(Portugal) João Moutinho	34(1)	2	1(1)	0	1(1)	0	36(3)	2	4	0	
32	MF	(Belgium) Leander Dendoncker	22(8)	2	2	0	2	1	26(8)	3	4	0	
33	DF	(England) Ryan Giles ¤	0	0	0	0	0	0	0	0	0	0	
34	DF	(England) Dion Sanderson ¤	0	0	0	0	0	0	0	0	0	0	
37	FW	(Spain) Adama Traoré ¤	11(9)	1	1	0	0(2)	0	12(11)	1	0	0	
39	MF	(England) Luke Cundle	2(2)	0	0(1)	0	0(1)	0	2(4)	0	0	0	
40	MF	(Japan) Hayao Kawabe ¤	0	0	0	0	0	0	0	0	0	0	
48	GK	(Republic of Ireland) James Storer	0	0	0	0	0	0	0	0	0	0	
54	MF	(United States) Owen Otasowie †	0	0	0	0	0	0	0	0	0	0	
59	DF	(Denmark) Oskar Buur †	0	0	0	0	0	0	0	0	0	0	
62	GK	(Denmark) Andreas Söndergaard ¤	0	0	0	0	0	0	0	0	0	0	
64	DF	(Spain) Hugo Bueno	0	0	0	0	0	0	0	0	0	0	
75	DF	(Portugal) Christian Marques ¤	0	0	0	0	0	0	0	0	0	0	
77	FW	(Wales) Chem Campbell	0(1)	0	0	0	0	0	0(1)	0	0	0	
81	DF	(England) Dexter Lembikisa	0	0	0	0	0	0	0	0	0	0	

== Transfers ==
=== Transfers in ===
Date	Position	Nationality	Name	From	Fee	Team	Ref.
17 June 2021	CB	(Colombia)	Yerson Mosquera	(Colombia) Atlético Nacional	Undisclosed	First team	
1 July 2021	GK	(England)	Louie Moulden	(England) Manchester City	Free transfer	Under 23's	
9 July 2021	LB	(France)	Rayan Aït-Nouri	(France) Angers	Undisclosed	First team	
15 July 2021	GK	(Portugal)	José Sá	(Greece) Olympiacos	Undisclosed	First team	
17 July 2021	RB	(Hungary)	Bendegúz Bolla	(Hungary) Fehérvár	Undisclosed	First team	
27 August 2021	DM	(Republic of Ireland)	Joe Hodge	(England) Manchester City	Undisclosed	Under 23's	
31 August 2021	DM	(England)	Harvey Griffiths	(England) Manchester City	Undisclosed	Under 23's	
17 September 2021	FW	(Wales)	Josh Esen	(Wales) Llanelli Town	Free transfer	Academy	
5 January 2022	CM	(Japan)	Hayao Kawabe	(Switzerland) Grasshoppers	Undisclosed	First team	
17 January 2022	FW	(Portugal)	Chiquinho	(Portugal) Estoril	Undisclosed	First team	
28 January 2022	RW	(South Korea)	Jeong Sang-bin	(South Korea) Suwon Samsung Bluewings	Undisclosed	First team	
11 March 2022	RW	(Pakistan)	Umar Nawaz	Unattached	Free transfer	Academy	

=== Loans in ===
Date from	Position	Nationality	Name	From	Date until	Team	Ref.
3 July 2021	RW	(Portugal)	Francisco Trincão	(Spain) Barcelona	End of season	First team	
29 August 2021	CF	(South Korea)	Hwang Hee-chan	(Germany) RB Leipzig	End of season (Note: On 26 January, Hwang Hee-chan signed on a permanent basis beginning from the start of 2022-23 season.)	First team	

=== New and extended contracts ===
Date	Position	Nationality	Name	Ref.
27 May 2021	CF	(England)	Austin Samuels	
1 June 2021	CB	(Austria)	Pascal Estrada	
24 June 2021	GK	(England)	John Ruddy	
2 July 2021	CM	(England)	Taylor Perry	
19 July 2021	CB	(England)	Dion Sanderson	
5 August 2021	LB	(Spain)	Hugo Bueno	
31 August 2021	CM	(England)	Morgan Gibbs-White	
31 August 2021	CB	(Netherlands)	Nigel Lonwijk	
31 August 2021	CB	(Portugal)	Christian Marques	
28 October 2021	RB	(Singapore)	Harry Birtwistle	
5 November 2021	CB	(England)	Max Kilman	
10 November 2021	LB	(England)	Dexter Lembikisa	
12 November 2021	CF	(England)	Tyler Roberts	
14 November 2021	LB	(England)	Aaron Keto-Diyawa	
23 November 2021	CB	(England)	Kam Kandola	
13 January 2022	LB	(Republic of Ireland)	Lewis Richards	
17 January 2022	CB	(Northern Ireland)	Jack Scott	
28 February 2022	CF	(England)	Nathan Fraser	
1 March 2022	CM	(England)	Luke Cundle	
9 March 2022	LW	(Portugal)	Pedro Neto	
21 March 2022	CB	(Portugal)	Toti	
12 April 2022	FW	(Northern Ireland)	Lee Harkin	

=== Loans out ===
Date from	Position	Nationality	Name	To	Date until	Team	Ref.
1 July 2021	LB	(Portugal)	Toti	(Switzerland) Grasshopper	4 January 2022 (Note: This was originally to be a season-long loan but Gomes was recalled during the January transfer window.)	Under-23s	
9 July 2021	LB	(Portugal)	Rúben Vinagre	(Portugal) Sporting CP	End of season	First team	
13 July 2021	LM	(England)	Ryan Giles	(Wales) Cardiff City	3 January 2022 (Note: This was originally to be a season-long loan but Giles was recalled during the January transfer window.)	Under-23s	
16 July 2021	FW	(Ecuador)	Leonardo Campana	(Switzerland) Grasshopper	20 January 2022 (Note: This was originally to be a season-long loan but Campana was recalled during the January transfer window.)	First team	
17 July 2021	RB	(Hungary)	Bendegúz Bolla	(Switzerland) Grasshopper	End of season	First team	
19 July 2021	CB	(England)	Dion Sanderson	(England) Birmingham City	4 January 2022 (Note: This was originally to be a season-long loan but Sanderson was recalled during the January transfer window.)	Under-23s	
26 July 2021	GK	(Montenegro)	Matija Sarkic	(England) Birmingham City	6 January 2022 (Note: This was originally to be a season-long loan but Sarkic was recalled during the January transfer window due to a season ending injury.)	First team	
29 July 2021	CF	(Azerbaijan)	Renat Dadashov	(Portugal) Tondela	End of season	Under-23s	
2 August 2021	CF	(Canada)	Theo Corbeanu	(England) Sheffield Wednesday	7 January 2022 (Note: This was originally to be a season-long loan but Corbeanu was recalled during the January transfer window.)	Under-23s	
5 August 2021	CM	(England)	Taylor Perry	(England) Cheltenham Town	12 January 2022 (Note: This was originally to be a season-long loan but Perry was recalled during the January transfer window.)	Under-23s	
12 August 2021	GK	(England)	Joe Young	(England) Runcorn Linnets	January 2022	Under-23s	
13 August 2021	CF	(Italy)	Patrick Cutrone	(Italy) Empoli	End of season	First team	
14 August 2021	GK	(England)	Jackson Smith	(England) Kettering Town	End of season (Note: This was originally meant to end in January 2022, but was extended till the end of the season.)	Under-23s	
24 August 2021	CF	(England)	Austin Samuels	(Scotland) Aberdeen	7 January 2022 (Note: This was originally to be a season-long loan but Samuels was recalled during the January transfer window.)	Under-23s	
27 August 2021	RB	(England)	Luke Matheson	(Scotland) Hamilton Academical	15 January 2022 (Note: On 15 January, Matheson was recalled early from his loan at Hamilton to facilitate a move to Scunthorpe.)	Under-23s	
31 August 2021	CM	(England)	Morgan Gibbs-White	(England) Sheffield United	End of season	First team	
31 August 2021	CB	(Netherlands)	Nigel Lonwijk	(Netherlands) Fortuna Sittard	End of season	Under-23s	
31 August 2021	CM	(Republic of Ireland)	Connor Ronan	(Scotland) St Mirren	End of season	First team	
31 August 2021	GK	(Denmark)	Andreas Söndergaard	(Denmark) Randers	January 2022	First team	
2 September 2021	CB	(Portugal)	Christian Marques	(Portugal) Belenenses	17 January 2022 (Note: This was originally to be a season-long loan but Marques was recalled during the January transfer window.)	Under-23s	
7 January 2022	CF	(Canada)	Theo Corbeanu	(England) Milton Keynes Dons	End of season	Under-23s	
13 January 2022	CB	(Republic of Ireland)	Lewis Richards	(England) Harrogate Town	End of season	Under-23s	
14 January 2022	GK	(England)	Joe Young	(England) Matlock Town	End of season	Under-23s	
14 January 2022	GK	(Republic of Ireland)	Joe O'Shaughnessy	(England) Hednesford Town	End of season	Under-23s	
15 January 2022	RB	(England)	Luke Matheson	(England) Scunthorpe United	End of season	Under-23s	
17 January 2022	CB	(Northern Ireland)	Jack Scott	(Republic of Ireland) St. Patrick's Athletic	January 2023	Under-23s	
21 January 2022	FW	(Ecuador)	Leonardo Campana	(United States) Inter Miami	January 2023	First team	
21 January 2022	CM	(Japan)	Hayao Kawabe	(Switzerland) Grasshopper	End of next season	First team	
25 January 2022	CB	(England)	Dion Sanderson	(England) Queens Park Rangers	End of season	Under-23s	
28 January 2022	RW	(South Korea)	Jeong Sang-bin	(Switzerland) Grasshopper	17 March 2023 (Note: This was originally to be a season and a half long loan but Sang-bin was recalled to Wolves.)	First team	
29 January 2022	RW	(Spain)	Adama Traoré	(Spain) Barcelona	End of season	First team	
30 January 2022	CM	(Portugal)	Bruno Jordão	(Switzerland) Grasshopper	End of season	First team	
30 January 2022	GK	(England)	Louie Moulden	(England) Ebbsfleet United	End of season	First team	
30 January 2022	GK	(Denmark)	Andreas Söndergaard	(England) Hereford	End of season	First team	
1 February 2022	LM	(England)	Ryan Giles	(England) Blackburn Rovers	End of season	First team	

=== Transfers out ===
Date	Position	Nationality	Name	To	Fee	Team	Ref.
1 July 2021	DF	(England)	Sadou Diallo	(England) Forest Green Rovers	Released	Under-23s	
1 July 2021	CF	(England)	Jaden Forrester	(Wales) Swansea City	Released	Academy	
1 July 2021	CB	(Central African Republic)	Cyriaque Mayounga	(Slovakia) Senica	Released	Under-23s	
1 July 2021	CM	(Slovakia)	Christián Herc	(Switzerland) Grasshopper	Free transfer	Under-23s	
1 July 2021	MF	(Malaysia)	Hong Wan	(Malaysia) Johor Darul Ta'zim	Free transfer	Under-23s	
13 July 2021	GK	(Portugal)	Rui Patrício	(Italy) Roma	Undisclosed	First team	
16 July 2021	MF	(Isle of Man)	Dean Pinnington	(England) Wigan Athletic	Free transfer	Academy	
20 August 2021	DM	(United States)	Owen Otasowie	(Belgium) Club Brugge	Undisclosed	First team	
20 August 2021	CF	(Spain)	Rafa Mir	(Spain) Sevilla	€15,000,000	First team	
28 January 2022	CF	(England)	Austin Samuels	(Scotland) Inverness Caledonian Thistle	Undisclosed	Under-23s	
31 January 2022	RB	(Denmark)	Oskar Buur	(Netherlands) Volendam	Contract terminated	First team	
31 January 2022	FW	(Spain)	Erik Bugarín	(Spain) Elche	Free transfer	Under-23s	

== See also ==
- 2021–22 in English football
- List of Wolverhampton Wanderers F.C. seasons
