= Kaly Sène =

Senegalese footballer

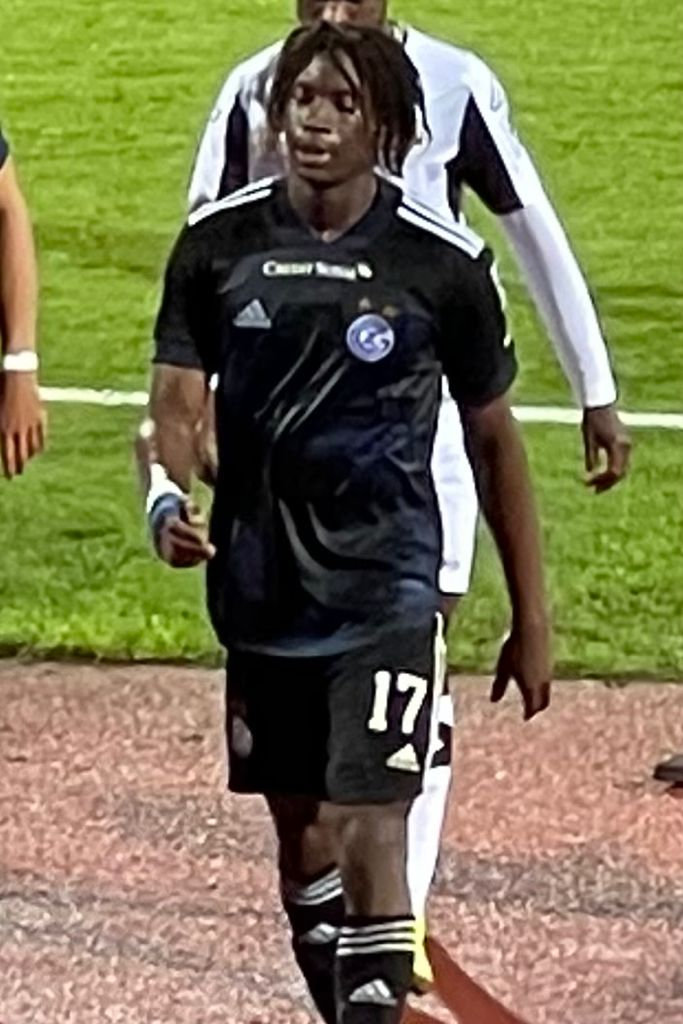
- Sène with Grasshoppers in 2021

Personal information
- Full name: Mamadou Kaly Sène
- Date of birth: 28 May 2001 (age 25)
- Place of birth: Dakar, Senegal
- Height: 1.80 m (5 ft 11 in)
- Position: Striker

Team information
- Current team: Young Boys
- Number: 9

Youth career
- 2014–2018: Vanchiglia 1915
- 2018–2020: Juventus

Senior career*
Years	Team	Apps	(Gls)
2020–2023	Basel	11	(0)
2021	Basel U-21	4	(2)
2020–2021	→ Omonia (loan)	10	(1)
2021–2022	→ Grasshoppers (loan)	25	(10)
2023–2025	Lausanne-Sport	74	(22)
2025–2026	Middlesbrough	28	(2)
2026–	Young Boys	11	(3)
- * Club domestic league appearances and goals as of 22 November 2026

Mamadou Kaly Sène (born 28 May 2001) is a Senegalese footballer who plays as a striker for Swiss Super League team Young Boys.

== Club career ==
=== Youth career ===
Sène started his youth football with local club Vanchiglia 2014 in Turin. In the summer of 2018, he was signed by Juventus to play for their Primavera Squad, in the highest level of Italian youth football. He was with them for two seasons, playing 31 games and scoring ten goals. He also represented the club in the UEFA Youth League.

=== Basel ===
On 21 August 2020 Basel announced that they had signed Sène and at the same time they also stated that, so as the 19-year-old could get match practice at the highest level, as quickly as possible, the club loaned him out to Omonia in Nicosia for a year until the summer of 2021. Because he had played 16 competitive games across all competitions by the winter break, his person met all the requirements for a Swiss work permit. Therefore, he returned to Switzerland and was able to train and play games with the Basel first team and with immediate effect.

Sène played his domestic league debut for his new club in the away game in the Letzigrund on 14 February 2021. He was substituted in the 72nd minute as Basel were defeated 0–2 by Zürich. In his first season with his new club Sène played a total of six games (five in the league, 1 test match) for Basel without scoring a goal.

==== Loan to Grasshoppers ====
On 1 September 2021, he joined Grasshoppers on a year-long loan with an option to buy. In his second game for Grasshoppers on 26 September 2021, he scored twice in a 3–1 win over Sion, and a week later he again scored twice against St. Gallen. St. Gallen would prove his favorite opponent, as he scored a hattrick against them on 5 December 2021 in their second matchup of the season. In particular, his second goal in that game, a stunning overhead kick, was voted by Grasshopper fans as the goal of the season. Grasshopper chose not to take the buy option and Sène returned to Basel at the end of the season.

==== Return to Basel and Belgian Interest ====
Following his return to Basel, he went to trial at Anderlecht, who would be paying a reported €2.5 million. Later on, reports linked him with fellow Belgian First Division A side OHL. However, a latent adductor injury discovered during his medical check made OHL pull out of the deal and reportedly caused Basel to consider taking legal action against Grasshoppers. Basel alleged that Grasshoppers had utilized the player while still injured. In an official statement, Grasshoppers refuted any wrong-doing, countering that Basel had deployed the forward in a test game that summer and had thus seen him as being fit enough.

He remained at Basel for the 2022–23 season. In only nine appearances across all competitions, he supplied one assist in 0–2 away victory over Luzern.

=== Lausanne-Sport ===
Following the expiration of his contract at Basel, he joined Lausanne-Sport on 23 June 2023, who were freshly promoted to the Swiss Super League. He signs a three-year contract with Lausanne-Sport, where he will wear number 9.

=== Middlesbrough ===
On 29 August 2025, he joined Middlesbrough in the EFL Championship on a four-year contract. He transferred for a reported £1.5m. Prior to this move, he had already scored six goals in the new season, three each in the league and the Conference League qualifying.

=== Young Boys ===
On 8 August 2026, Sène returned to Switzerland and signed a four-year contract with Young Boys.

== Career statistics ==
As of 19 September 2026

Club	Season	League			Cup		Continental		Other		Total	
Club	Season	Division	Apps	Goals	Apps	Goals	Apps	Goals	Apps	Goals	Apps	Goals
Omonia (loan)	2020–21	Cypriot First Division	10	1	0	0	6 (Note: Includes matches played in the UEFA Champions League and the UEFA Europa League)	0	—		16	1
Basel	2020–21	Swiss Super League	5	0	—		—		—		5	0
Basel	2021–22	Swiss Super League	1	0	1	1	3 (Note: Includes matches played in the UEFA Europa Conference League)	0	—		5	1
Basel	2022–23	Swiss Super League	5	0	1	0	3	0	—		9	0
Basel	Total		11	0	2	1	6	0	0	0	19	1
Grasshoppers (loan)	2021–22	Swiss Super League	25	10	1	0	—		—		25	10
Lausanne-Sport	2023–24	Swiss Super League	36	12	3	0	0	0	—		39	12
Lausanne-Sport	2024–25	Swiss Super League	35	7	4	0	0	0	—		39	7
Lausanne-Sport	2025–26	Swiss Super League	3	3	0	0	5	3	—		8	6
Lausanne-Sport	Total		74	22	7	0	5	3	0	0	86	25
Middlesbrough	2025–26	Championship	28	1	0	0	—		0	0	28	1
Young Boys	2026–27	Swiss Super League	6	2	1	0	—		—		7	2
Career total			154	36	11	1	17	3	0	0	182	40

== Sources ==
- Kaly Sène at Soccerway
- Profile Kaly Sene at homepage of Verein "Basler Fussballarchiv"
- Καλί Σενέ (in Greek)
