= Toti Gomes =

Footballer (born 1999)

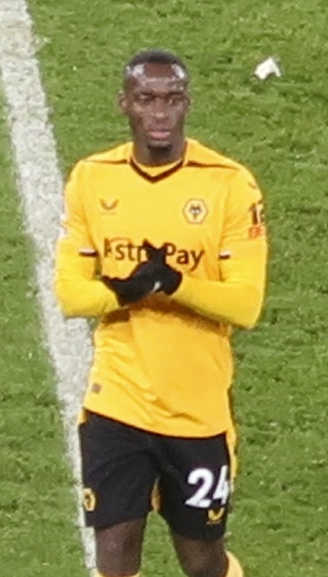
- Gomes playing for Wolverhampton Wanderers in 2023

Personal information
- Full name: Tote António Gomes
- Date of birth: 16 January 1999 (age 27)
- Place of birth: Bissau, Guinea-Bissau
- Height: 1.87 m (6 ft 2 in)
- Positions: Centre-back; left-back

Team information
- Current team: Wolverhampton Wanderers
- Number: 24

Youth career
- 2014–2016: Fontainhas
- 2016–2017: GDS Cascais
- 2017–2019: Estoril

Senior career*
Years	Team	Apps	(Gls)
2019–2020	Estoril	3	(0)
2020–	Wolverhampton Wanderers	106	(2)
2020–2022	→ Grasshoppers (loan)	50	(3)

International career
2019	Portugal U20	1	(0)
2023–2024	Portugal	2	(0)
- * Club domestic league appearances and goals as of 23:42, 24 May 2026 (UTC)

Tote António Gomes (born 16 January 1999), also known mononymously as Toti, is a professional footballer who plays as a centre-back or left-back for and captains EFL Championship club Wolverhampton Wanderers. Born in Guinea-Bissau, he represented the Portugal national team.

== Club career ==
=== Estoril ===
Gomes made his LigaPro debut for Estoril on 5 May 2019 in a game against Académico Viseu.

=== Wolverhampton Wanderers move and loan to Grasshoppers ===
On 2 September 2020, Gomes was signed by English Premier League side Wolverhampton Wanderers and immediately loaned out to Swiss Challenge League side Grasshoppers for the 2020–21 season. His first appearance for the Swiss club was a start in the opening game, against Winterthur, which Grasshopper won. He scored his first goal for the Swiss side during a 5–2 loss against Kriens.

After a successful campaign with the Swiss club, which saw them promoted to the Swiss Super League, Gomes returned to Grasshoppers on another season-long loan. He spent the first half of the 2021–22 season at Grasshopper but was then recalled by his parent club to spend January training at Wolverhampton before a potential return to Switzerland.

=== Return to Wolves ===
With then-Wolves teammate Romain Saïss away at the Africa Cup of Nations, Wolves recalled Gomes at the same time as signing his Grasshoppers teammate, Hayao Kawabe. Gomes made his Wolves début in Saïss's position on 15 January 2022 in a 3–1 Premier League victory over Southampton at Molineux. On 21 March 2022, Gomes signed a new contract with Wolves until 2027. Toti scored his first goal for Wolves, and his first goal in the Premier League, on 6 May 2023 against Aston Villa at Molineux: it turned out to be the only goal of the game as Wolves won 1–0.

Toti made his 50th competitive appearance for Wolves in a 4–2 win away to Chelsea in the Premier League on 4 February 2024. On 8 February, Wolves announced Toti had signed a five-and-a-half-year contract extension keeping him with the club until 2029.

On 16 August 2025, ahead of the club's first match of the season against Manchester City, Toti was named captain of the club. A week later on 23 August, in their 1–0 defeat to Bournemouth, Toti was shown his first red card in his Wolves career as he produced a foul on Evanilson leading to a denial of goalscoring opportunity.

== International career ==
Eligible for both Guinea-Bissau and Portugal, Gomes represented Portugal at under-20 level. On 29 May 2023, Gomes was called up to the Portugal senior national team for the first time, for Euro 2024 qualifiers against Bosnia & Herzegovina and Iceland.

Gomes made his senior debut for Portugal on 16 November 2023, starting and playing the full match in a 2–0 away victory over Liechtenstein, during qualifying for UEFA Euro 2024.

== Career statistics ==
=== Club ===
As of match played 24 May 2026

Appearances and goals by club, season and competition
Club	Season	League			National cup (Note: Includes Taça de Portugal, FA Cup, Swiss Cup)		League cup (Note: Includes Taça da Liga, EFL Cup)		Other		Total	
Club	Season	Division	Apps	Goals	Apps	Goals	Apps	Goals	Apps	Goals	Apps	Goals
Estoril	2018–19	LigaPro	3	0	0	0	0	0	0	0	3	0
Estoril	2019–20	LigaPro	0	0	0	0	0	0	0	0	0	0
Estoril	Total		3	0	0	0	0	0	0	0	3	0
Wolverhampton Wanderers	2020–21	Premier League	0	0	0	0	0	0	—		0	0
Wolverhampton Wanderers	2021–22	Premier League	4	0	1	0	—		—		5	0
Wolverhampton Wanderers	2022–23	Premier League	17	1	2	0	1	0	—		20	1
Wolverhampton Wanderers	2023–24	Premier League	35	1	5	0	2	1	—		42	2
Wolverhampton Wanderers	2024–25	Premier League	31	0	2	0	1	0	—		34	0
Wolverhampton Wanderers	2025–26	Premier League	19	0	1	0	2	0	—		22	0
Wolverhampton Wanderers	Total		106	2	11	0	6	1	0	0	123	3
Grasshoppers (loan)	2020–21	Swiss Challenge League	34	2	2	0	—		—		36	2
Grasshoppers (loan)	2021–22	Swiss Super League	16	1	1	0	—		—		17	1
Grasshoppers (loan)	Total		50	3	3	0	0	0	0	0	53	3
Career total			159	5	14	0	6	1	0	0	179	6
