= Jia Boyan =

Chinese association football player

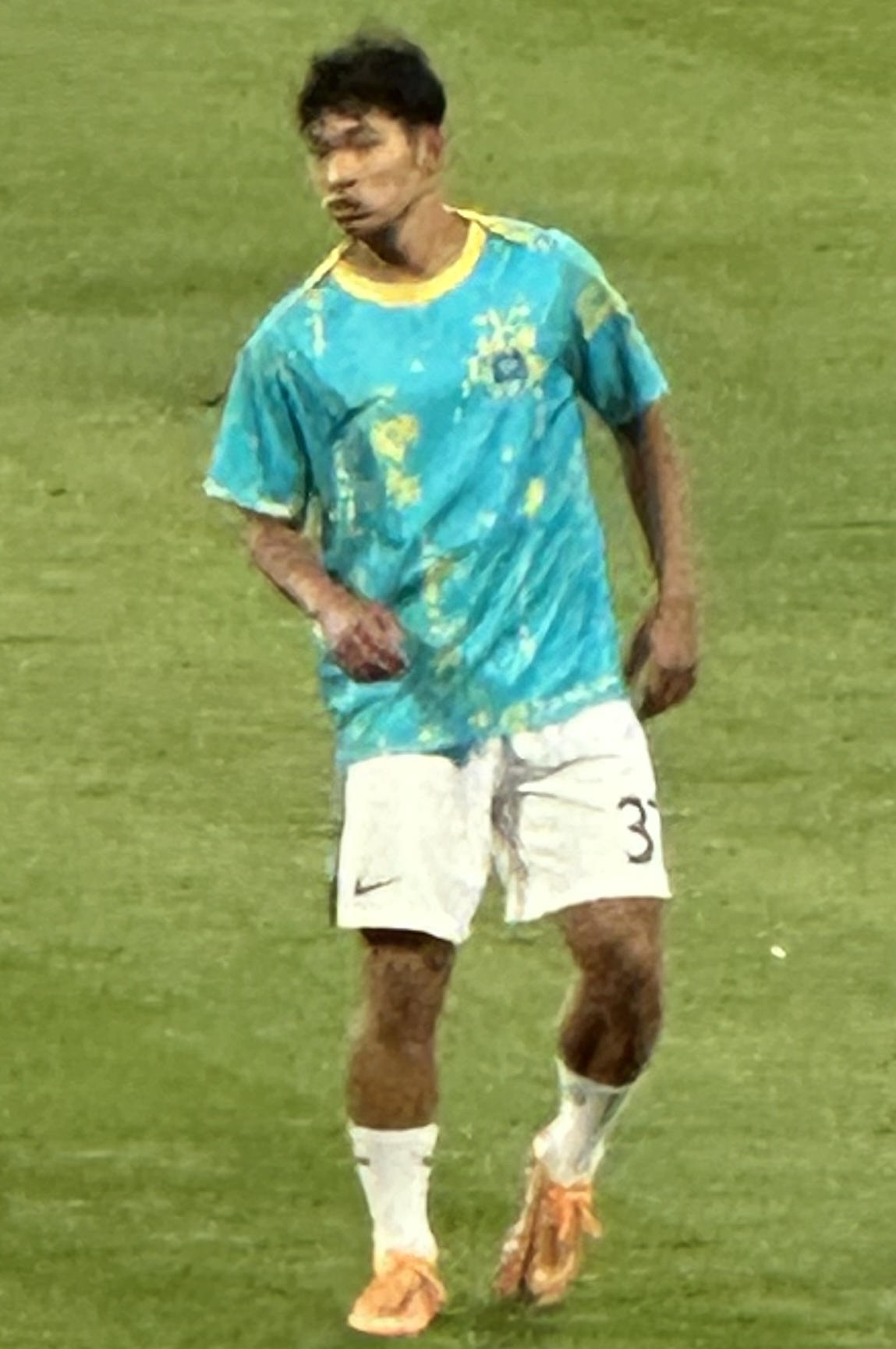
- Jia Boyan in May 2025

Personal information
- Date of birth: 30 November 2003 (age 22)
- Place of birth: Luoyang, Henan, China
- Height: 1.70 m (5 ft 7 in)
- Position: Forward

Team information
- Current team: Nantong Zhiyun
- Number: 37

Youth career
- Shanghai Luckystar
- 2016–2020: Shanghai SIPG
- 2023-2024: Grasshopper

Senior career*
Years	Team	Apps	(Gls)
2020–2021	Shanghai SIPG	3	(0)
2020	→ China U19 (loan)	7	(1)
2022–2024	Grasshopper	0	(0)
2022–2023	→ NK Dubrava (loan)	17	(1)
2024–	Nantong Zhiyun	38	(7)

International career^{‡}
2019	China U16	2	(2)
- China U20
- * Club domestic league appearances and goals as of 9 March 2026 ‡ National team caps and goals as of 29 July 2021

Jia Boyan (Chinese: 贾博琰; born 30 November 2003) is a Chinese footballer who plays as a forward for China League One club Nantong Zhiyun.

== Club career ==
Jia Boyan would play for the Shanghai SIPG youth teams where he personally scored 17 goals in the 2018 U15 National Championship. He would soon be promoted to the senior team by Head coach Vítor Pereira for the 2020 Chinese Super League season where he made his debut on 31 August 2020 in a league game against Tianjin TEDA F.C. in a 4-1 victory where he came on as a substitute for Marko Arnautović. At 16 years old and 275 days, Jia became the third youngest player in Chinese Super League history, and was included in The Guardian's "Next Generation 2020".

On 16 February 2022, Jia joined Swiss Super League club Grasshoppers and was immediately loaned to Druga HNL club NK Dubrava. During his first year there, he was mostly playing for the U19 squad. He made his debut for the first team in the second round of the Croatian Football Cup, where he shot the first goal in the second minute in a 2-3 defeat to HNK Gorica.

== Career statistics ==
=== Club ===
As of 3 June 2023

Club	Season	League			Cup		Continental		Other		Total	
Club	Season	Division	Apps	Goals	Apps	Goals	Apps	Goals	Apps	Goals	Apps	Goals
Shanghai SIPG	2020	Chinese Super League	1	0	0	0	–		–		1	0
Shanghai SIPG	2021	Chinese Super League	2	0	0	0	–		–		2	0
Shanghai SIPG	Total		3	0	0	0	0	0	0	0	3	0
China U19 (loan)	2020	China League Two	7	1	1 (Note: Appearances in the Chinese FA Cup)	0	–		–		8	1
Grasshopper	2021–22	Swiss Super League	0	0	0	0	–		–		0	0
NK Dubrava (loan)	2021–22	2. HNL	0	0	0	0	–		–		0	0
NK Dubrava (loan)	2022–23	2. HNL	17	1	1 (Note: Appearances in the Croatian Football Cup)	1	–		–		18	2
Career total			27	2	2	1	0	0	0	0	29	3
