= Djibril Diani =

French footballer (born 1998)

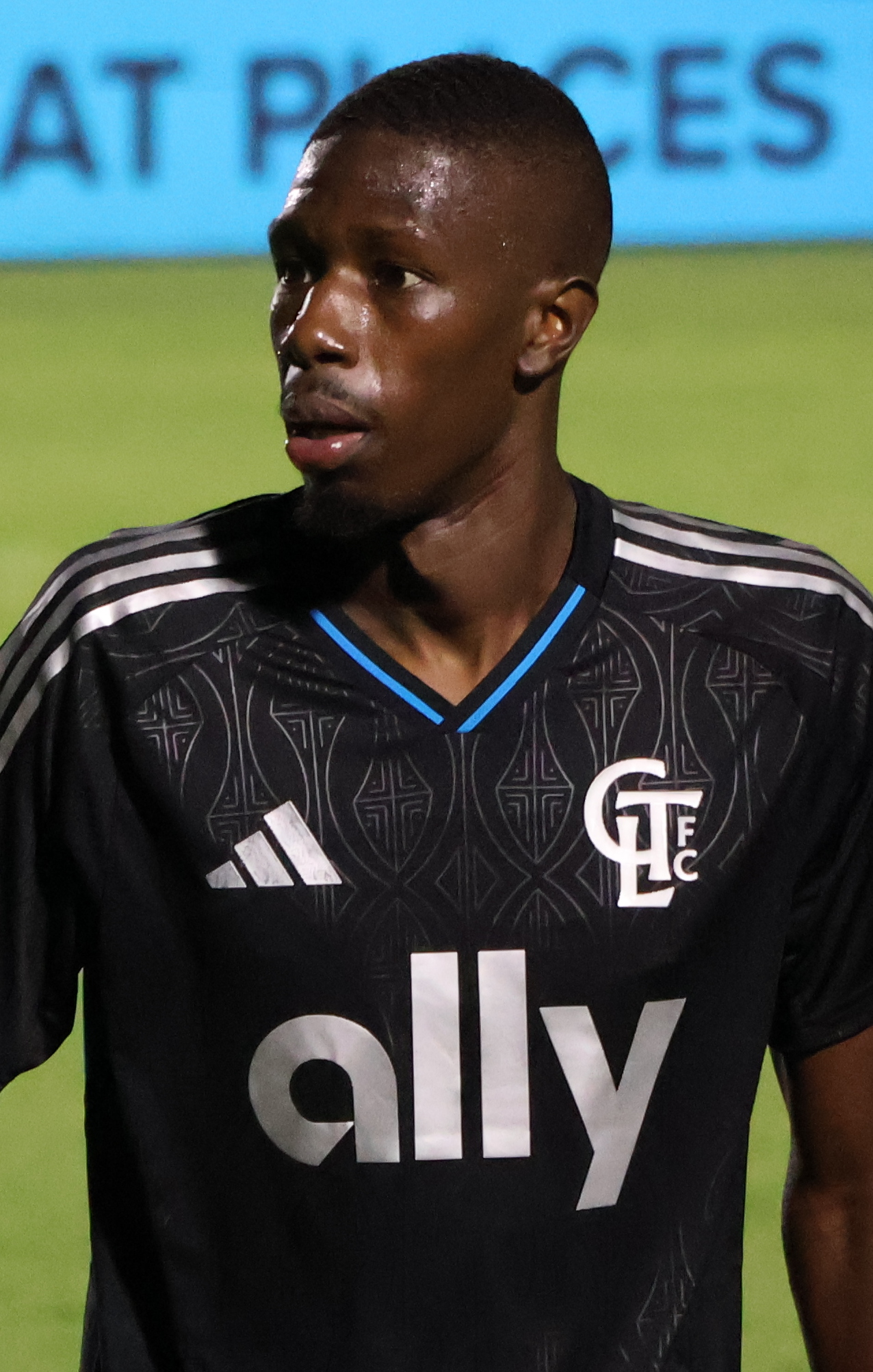
- Diani with Charlotte FC in 2025

Personal information
- Date of birth: 11 February 1998 (age 28)
- Place of birth: Créteil, France
- Height: 1.95 m (6 ft 5 in)
- Position: Midfielder

Team information
- Current team: Charlotte FC
- Number: 28

Youth career
- 2004–2006: Quartiers Libres
- 2006–2013: Choisy-le-Roi
- 2013–2016: Lens

Senior career*
Years	Team	Apps	(Gls)
2016–2018	Lens B	54	(4)
2018–2022	Grasshoppers	66	(3)
2021	→ Livingston (loan)	4	(0)
2018–2020	Grasshoppers II	15	(1)
2022–2024	Caen	47	(2)
2023–2024	Caen II	4	(1)
2024–	Charlotte FC	84	(1)

International career
2013–2014	France U16	9	(1)
- * Club domestic league appearances and goals as of 20:44, 15 November 2026 (UTC)

Djibril Diani (born 11 February 1998) is a French professional footballer who plays as a midfielder for Major League Soccer club Charlotte FC.

== Club career ==
On 2 February 2021, it was confirmed that Diani had joined Scottish Premiership side Livingston on a six-month loan deal with an option to make the deal permanent. He returned to Grasshopper Club Zürich for the following season. On 4 January 2022, Diani signed for Ligue 2 club Caen on a contract until 2024.

On 14 February 2024, Diani signed with Major League Soccer side Charlotte FC on a two-year deal.

== International career ==
Diani was born in France and is of Malian descent. He is a youth international for France.
