= Imran Bunjaku =

Kosovar footballer (born 1992)

Personal information
- Date of birth: 18 October 1992 (age 34)
- Place of birth: Zürich, Switzerland]
- Height: 1.78 m (5 ft 10 in)
- Position: Midfielder

Youth career
- Grasshoppers

Senior career*
Years	Team	Apps	(Gls)
2010–2014	Grasshoppers II	61	(0)
2013–2014	Grasshoppers	5	(0)
2014–2021	Schaffhausen	133	(6)
2021–2022	Grasshoppers	0	(0)
2021–2022	→ Aarau (loan)	25	(1)
2022–2023	Aarau	23	(1)

International career^{‡}
2011–2014	Albania U21	13	(0)
2014–	Kosovo	3	(1)
- * Club domestic league appearances and goals as of 18 June 2023 ‡ National team caps and goals as of 10 October 2015

Imran Bunjaku (born 18 October 1992) is a professional footballer who plays as a midfielder. Born in Switzerland, he plays for the Kosovo national team.

== Club career ==
Before the 2021–22 season, Bunjaku returned to Grasshoppers after six-and-a-half seasons at Schaffhausen. On 30 August 2021, he moved to Aarau on loan. On 14 June 2022, he signed a one-year contract with an option to extend with Aarau, after his contract at Grasshoppers was not renewed.

== International career ==
Originating from Kosovo with ethnic Albanian parents and born in Switzerland, Bunjaku was eligible to play for Switzerland, Albania and Kosovo if a national team should be formed, but in March 2011 he answered the call by Albania's Under-21 coach Artan Bushati for a non official friendly tournament held in Slovenia.

He officially gained Albanian citizenship on 26 August 2011 along with his Grasshopper teammate Mërgim Brahimi, in order to compete in the UEFA Under-21 Championship qualifiers.

In 2014 Bunjaku received call-up from Kosovo and he made his debut for Kosovo on 25 May 2014 in a friendly match against Senegal.

On 7 September 2024, in another friendly game against Oman, he scored his first and only goal for Kosovo, becoming at 21 years and 10 months the country's youngest goalscorer. This record was broken on 13 November 2015 by Bersant Celina who was 19 years and 2 months when he scored against Albania.

He earned his third and final cap with Kosovo on 10 October 2015 during a friendly match against Equatorial Guinea.
