= Lévi Ntumba =

French footballer (born 2001)

Personal information
- Full name: Lévi Don À-Dieu Kahiamba Ntumba
- Date of birth: 12 January 2001 (age 25)
- Place of birth: Paris, France
- Height: 1.98 m (6 ft 6 in)
- Position: Goalkeeper

Team information
- Current team: Slavia Sofia
- Number: 63

Youth career
- –2018: Dijon

Senior career*
Years	Team	Apps	(Gls)
2017–2021	Dijon II	27	(0)
2018–2021	Dijon	0	(0)
2022–2023	Grasshopper II	24	(0)
2024–2025	CSKA 1948 II	14	(0)
2024–2025	CSKA 1948	6	(0)
2025–	Slavia Sofia	28	(0)

International career^{‡}
2017	France U16	1	(0)
2017–2018	France U17	9	(0)
2018	France U18	4	(0)
2019	France U19	0	(0)
- * Club domestic league appearances and goals as of 11 June 2026 ‡ National team caps and goals as of 4 July 2022

Lévi Ntumba (born 12 January 2001) is a French professional footballer who plays as a goalkeeper for Bulgarian First League club Slavia Sofia.

== Professional career ==
Ntumba has made 27 appearances for the reserve team of Dijon FCO between 2018 and 2021 in the Championnat National 3. He chose not to renew his contract in summer 2021.

On 7 January 2022, he signed with Grasshopper Club Zürich, as their third goalkeeper. In the 2021-22 season, he made seven appearances for the reserve team in the First League.

On 2 February 2024, he joined Bulgarian First League side CSKA 1948.

In June 2025, upon his contract completion with CSKA 1948, it was announced that he has signed with Slavia Sofia.

== Personal life ==
Born in Paris, France, he is of Congolese and Malagasy roots.
