= Allen Njie =

Liberian footballer

Personal information
- Date of birth: 26 July 1999 (age 27)
- Place of birth: Barnesville, Liberia
- Height: 1.85 m (6 ft 1 in)
- Position: Midfielder

Youth career
- Pepper Football Club

Senior career*
Years	Team	Apps	(Gls)
2016–2019	LISCR		
2019–2021	Grasshopper	18	(2)
2020	→ Bnei Sakhnin (loan)	0	(0)
2021	→ Slaven Belupo (loan)	1	(0)
2021–2023	Aarau	60	(2)
2024	Vaduz	15	(0)

International career^{‡}
2018	Liberia U20	5	(0)
2018–2024	Liberia	20	(0)
- * Club domestic league appearances and goals as of 28 May 2024 ‡ National team caps and goals as of 17:54, 28 March 2023 (UTC)

Allen Njie (born 26 July 1999) is a Liberian former footballer who played as a midfielder.

== Club career ==
Born in Barnesville, Njie has played for Liberian clubs Pepper FC and LISCR as well as Swiss club Grasshopper.

In October 2020 he moved on loan to Israeli club Bnei Sakhnin.

In February 2021 he moved on loan to Croatian club Slaven Belupo.

In July 2021, he moved to Swiss club FC Aarau. In autumn 2023, he missed a number of games for personal reasons and subsequently his contract with Aarau was dissolved by mutual consent on 29 November 2023.

He signed with Liechtenstein side FC Vaduz on 20 December 2023 to begin in the second half of the season. On 30 April, Vaduz announced that they would not extend his contract after the end of the season.

== International career ==
After playing for the Liberian under-20 team, he made his senior international debut for Liberia in 2018.
