= Nuno da Silva =

Swiss footballer (born 1994)

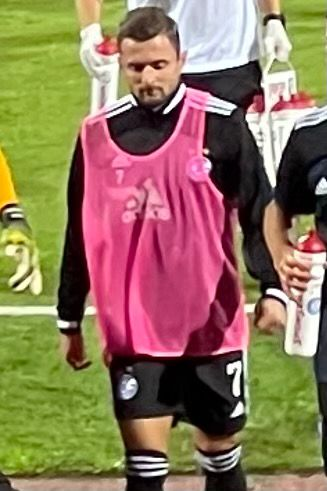
- Da Silva in 2021

Personal information
- Full name: Nuno Filipe da Silva
- Date of birth: 14 March 1994 (age 32)
- Place of birth: Zürich, Switzerland
- Height: 1.70 m (5 ft 7 in)
- Position: Midfielder

Team information
- Current team: Bellinzona
- Number: 77

Youth career
- Breitenrain
- Young Boys

Senior career*
Years	Team	Apps	(Gls)
2012–2015	Young Boys U21	59	(20)
2015	→ Breitenrain (loan)	12	(3)
2015–2017	Breitenrain	51	(7)
2016	→ Aarau (loan)	7	(0)
2017–2021	Thun	47	(7)
2018	→ Thun U21	5	(0)
2019–2020	→ Winterthur (loan)	36	(3)
2021–2022	Grasshopper Club Zürich	38	(1)
2022–2024	Aarau	51	(3)
2024	Schaffhausen	18	(4)
2024–	Bellinzona	28	(0)
- * Club domestic league appearances and goals as of 1 July 2025

Nuno Filipe da Silva (born 14 March 1994) is a Swiss professional football player who plays as a midfielder for Bellinzona in the Swiss Challenge League.

== Career ==
A youth product of Young Boys, he made his professional debut for his former youth club Breitenrain in the Swiss Promotion League, the third tier of Swiss football.

On 23 July 2017, da Silva made his top-flight debut with Thun in the Swiss Super League, in a match against Sion. In 2020, he was relegated together with Thun to the Swiss Challenge League, after losing the relegation play-off to FC Vaduz.

He caused quite a stir in February 2021, when he signed for Swiss record champion Grasshopper Club Zürich. GC had been relegated to the Challenge League the previous season and were in direct competition with Thun for the top spot at the time. Together with GC, he achieved promotion to the Swiss Super League at the end of the season.

After one and a half years at Grasshopper Club Zürich, he returned to the Challenge League, signing with FC Aarau on 16 June 2022. He had previously played at Aarau in 2016 during a loan spell.

On 1 February 2024, da Silva moved to Schaffhausen, also in the Challenge League.

On 6 August 2024, da Silva joined Bellinzona.
