= Aleksandar Cvetković (footballer) =

Serbian footballer

Personal information
- Date of birth: 4 June 1995 (age 31)
- Place of birth: Prokuplje, FR Yugoslavia
- Height: 1.88 m (6 ft 2 in)
- Position: Centre-back

Team information
- Current team: YF Juventus
- Number: 3

Youth career
- BSK Borča

Senior career*
Years	Team	Apps	(Gls)
2013–2014	BSK Borča	28	(3)
2014–2016	Jagodina	4	(0)
2016	→ BSK Borča (loan)	14	(3)
2016–2017	BSK Borča	27	(2)
2017–2018	FC Wohlen	13	(1)
2018–2022	Grasshoppers	95	(4)
2022–2024	Aarau	52	(5)
2024-2025	Sri Pahang	18	(1)
2026	Radnik Surdulica	1	(0)
2026-	YF Juventus	3	(0)
- * Club domestic league appearances and goals as of 1 October 2026

Aleksandar Cvetković (Serbian Cyrillic: Александар Цветковић; born 4 June 1995) is a Serbian professional footballer who plays as a defender for Swiss Promotion League club YF Juventus.

== Club career ==
Cvetković moved to Switzerland in 2017, when he joined a fledgling FC Wohlen, who ceased their professional football activities at the end of the season. For the following season, he joined record Swiss champions Grasshopper Club Zürich, who were similarly struggling in the Swiss Super League. Following their relegation in 2019, he stuck with the club and, as captain of the squad, led them back to promotion in 2021.

Despite this success, he got little play time in the new season. On 12 January 2022, in agreement with the club, his contract was dissolved. Two days later, he had joined Swiss Challenge League club FC Aarau, whom he hopes to also lead back to promotion. On 28 July 2022, he signed with FC Aarau for a further two years.

On 4 March 2024, he departed Aarau to join Malaysia Super League side Sri Pahang FC.

== Honours ==
- Swiss Challenge League
  - Winners: 2020–21
