= Hayao Kawabe =

Japanese footballer

Hayao Kawabe 川辺 駿
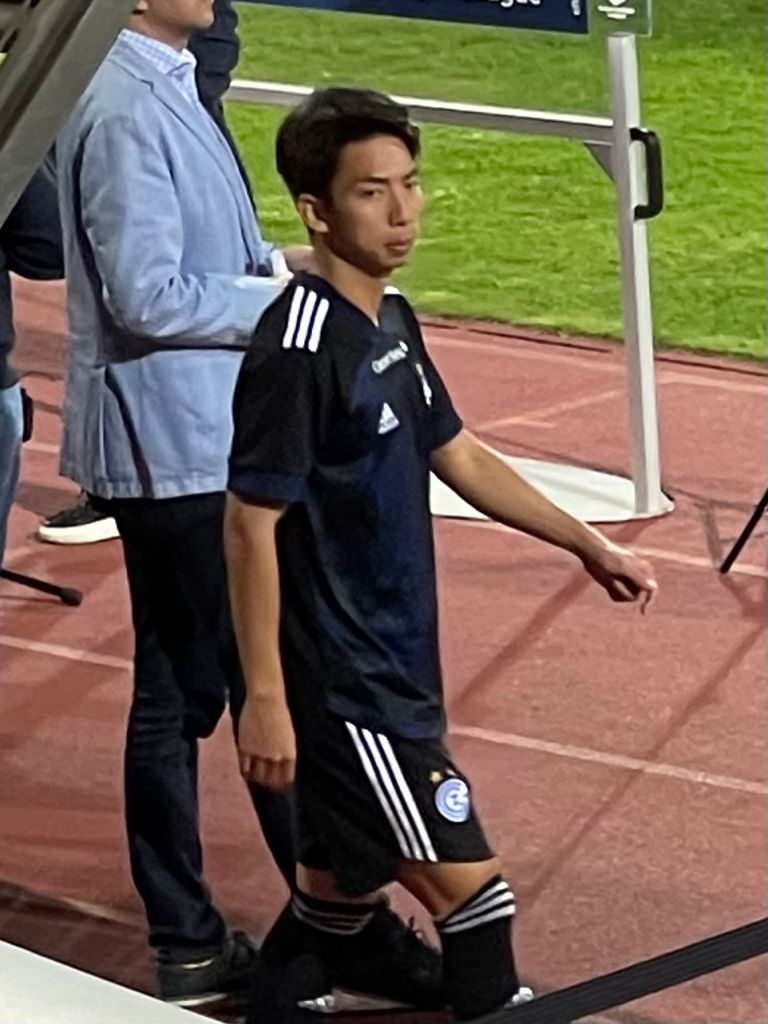
- Kawabe with Grasshopper in 2021

Personal information
- Date of birth: 8 September 1995 (age 31)
- Place of birth: Asakita-ku, Hiroshima, Japan
- Height: 1.78 m (5 ft 10 in)
- Position: Midfielder

Team information
- Current team: Sanfrecce Hiroshima
- Number: 6

Youth career
- 2002–2007: Hiroshima Koyo FC
- 2008–2013: Sanfrecce Hiroshima

Senior career*
Years	Team	Apps	(Gls)
2013–2021	Sanfrecce Hiroshima	124	(9)
2015–2017	→ Júbilo Iwata (loan)	91	(9)
2021	Grasshoppers	16	(4)
2022–2023	Wolverhampton Wanderers	0	(0)
2022–2023	→ Grasshoppers (loan)	51	(12)
2023–2024	Standard Liège	36	(7)
2024–	Sanfrecce Hiroshima	69	(5)

International career^{‡}
2014	Japan U17	4	(0)
2021–2025	Japan	8	(1)
- * Club domestic league appearances and goals as of 9 August 2026 ‡ National team caps and goals as of 10:22, 15 July 2025 (UTC)

Hayao Kawabe (川辺 駿, Kawabe Hayao; born 8 September 1995) is a Japanese professional footballer who plays as a midfielder for J1 League club Sanfrecce Hiroshima.

== Club career ==
=== Sanfrecce Hiroshima ===
Kawabe joined Sanfrecce Hiroshima in 2008, alongside other products of the club's academy. After his debut in 2012, he was offered a full pro contract by Sanfrecce. Despite this achievement, he found too few minutes on the pitch and decided to go to Júbilo Iwata on loan. In January 2018, he came back to Sanfrecce after a three-years loan to Jubilo.

=== Grasshopper Club Zürich and Wolverhampton Wanderers ===
On 8 July 2021, he signed a 3-year contract with Grasshoppers in the Swiss Super League. Due to delays with his work permit, he only made his debut on 7 August 2021 against Lausanne-Sport, being named in the starting lineup and playing 60 minutes. He scored his first goal in a 3-1 away victory over FC Sion on 31 October 2021, scoring the opener in the 32nd minute

On 5 January 2022, Kawabe joined Premier League side Wolverhampton Wanderers on a three-and-a-half-year deal, with the club intending on loaning him back to Grasshoppers in the near future. He returned to Grasshoppers on 19 January 2022 and will remain until the end of the 2022–2023 season. He finished the season at Grasshoppers with 34 appearances, playing every game since gaining eligibility. In his first season in Europe, he scored seven goals and supplied three assists. In the first game of the 2022–23 season, he scored both goals in a 2-1 home win against FC Lugano. As a result, he was voted "SFL Player of the Round" by the viewers from among five nominees.

On 25 May 2023, Grasshoppers announced that Kawabe would leave the club at the end of the season.

=== Standard Liège ===
On 7 July 2023, he permanently joined Standard Liège for a reported fee of £1.3 million.

=== Return to Sanfrecce Hiroshima ===
On 2 August 2024, Kawabe returned to Sanfrecce Hiroshima.

== International career ==
He made his debut for Japan national football team on 25 March 2021 in a friendly against South Korea. On 7 June 2021, he shot his first international goal, the final goal in a 4-1 victory over Tajikistan in the 2022 FIFA World Cup qualification.

== Career statistics ==
=== Club ===
As of match played 20 Dec 2023

Club performance			League		Cup		League Cup		Continental		Total	
Season	Club	League	Apps	Goals	Apps	Goals	Apps	Goals	Apps	Goals	Apps	Goals
Japan			League		Emperor's Cup		League Cup		AFC		Total	
2013	Sanfrecce Hiroshima	J1 League	3	0	0	0	0	0	2	0	5	0
2014	Sanfrecce Hiroshima	J1 League	1	0	3	0	0	0	2	0	6	0
2015	Júbilo Iwata (loan)	J2 League	33	3	1	0	–		–		34	3
2016	Júbilo Iwata (loan)	J1 League	26	2	0	0	5	0	–		31	2
2017	Júbilo Iwata (loan)	J1 League	32	4	3	0	3	1	–		38	5
2018	Sanfrecce Hiroshima	J1 League	33	0	3	0	5	0	–		41	0
2019	Sanfrecce Hiroshima	J1 League	34	3	1	0	2	0	4	0	41	3
2020	Sanfrecce Hiroshima	J1 League	34	3	–		1	0	–		35	3
2021	Sanfrecce Hiroshima	J1 League	19	3	0	0	2	0	–		21	3
Japan total			215	18	11	0	18	1	8	0	252	19
2021–22	Grasshopper Club Zürich	Super League	16	4	2	0	-		-		18	4
2022-23	Wolverhampton Wanderers	Premier League	0	0	0	0	0	0	0	0	0	0
2021–22	Grasshopper Club Zürich (loan)	Super League	18	3	0	0	-		-		18	3
2022–23	Grasshopper Club Zürich (loan)	Super League	33	9	2	0	-		-		35	9
Switzerland total			67	16	4	0	0	0	0	0	71	16
2023–24	Standard Liège	Belgian Pro League	27	7	1	0	-		-		28	7
Belgium total			27	7	1	0	0	0	0	0	28	7
Career total			309	41	16	0	18	1	8	0	351	42

=== International goals ===
No.	Date	Venue	Opponent	Score	Result	Competition
1.	7 June 2021	Panasonic Stadium Suita, Suita, Japan	Tajikistan	4–1	4–1	2022 FIFA World Cup qualification

== Honours ==
Sanfrecce Hiroshima

- J.League Cup: 2025
- Japanese Super Cup: 2025

Japan

- EAFF Championship: 2025
