= Nikola Gjorgjev =

Macedonian footballer (born 1997)

Personal information
- Date of birth: 22 August 1997 (age 29)
- Place of birth: Zürich, Switzerland
- Height: 1.74 m (5 ft 9 in)
- Position: Winger

Team information
- Current team: Xamax
- Number: 28

Youth career
- 2006–2008: Wettingen
- 2008–2015: Grasshoppers

Senior career*
Years	Team	Apps	(Gls)
2014–2019	Grasshoppers II	42	(8)
2015–2022	Grasshoppers	111	(15)
2017–2018	→ FC Twente (loan)	2	(0)
2018	→ Aarau (loan)	15	(1)
2022	→ Schaffhausen (loan)	16	(4)
2022–2025	Aarau	119	(22)
2025–2026	Farense	7	(0)
2026–	Xamax	5	(0)

International career^{‡}
2012	Switzerland U15	1	(2)
2012–2013	Switzerland U16	8	(0)
2014	Switzerland U17	1	(0)
2014–2015	Switzerland U18	6	(1)
2015–2016	Switzerland U19	7	(2)
2016–2018	Macedonia U21	12	(2)
2016–	North Macedonia	5	(0)
- * Club domestic league appearances and goals as of 11 September 2026 ‡ National team caps and goals as of 16 October 2018

Nikola Gjorgjev (Macedonian: Никола Ѓорѓев; born 22 August 1997) is a professional footballer who plays as a winger for Swiss Challenge League club Xamax. Born in Switzerland, he plays for the North Macedonia national team.

== Club career ==
=== Grasshopper Club Zürich ===
Gjorgjev is a youth exponent from Grasshoppers. He made his Swiss Super League debut on 14 March 2015 against FC Thun. He replaced Yoric Ravet after 77 minutes. He was loaned out to Eredivisie side FC Twente Enschede on a two-year deal in July 2017. As he only got two caps in the first half of that season, he was loaned to FC Aarau in the Swiss Challenge League in February 2018, with an option to buy. This option was not taken at the end of the season and Gjorgjev returned to Grasshoppers at the end of the season.

At Grasshoppers, he became a mainstay in the first squad and eventually became instrumental in securing their promotion back to the Swiss Super League in 2021, with seven goals and ten assists. However, in their first season back in the top Swiss league, he barely got playtime anymore. On 12 February 2022, Gjorgjev moved to Schaffhausen on loan until the end of the season. He quickly established himself in the starting lineup. In 16 games, he supplied four goals and five assists, helping Schaffhausen qualify for the Promotion Play-offs, where they lost to FC Luzern.

=== FC Aarau ===
Following his loan spell at Schaffhausen and his subsequent return to Grasshoppers, his contract was not renewed and he instead signed a two-year deal with his former employer FC Aarau. He departed Aarau at the end of the 2024–25 season.

=== Farense ===
On 27 June 2025, Gjorgjev signed with Farense in the Portuguese second tier.

=== Xamax ===
On 31 July 2026, Gjorgjev returned to Switzerland and signed with Xamax.

== International career ==
Born in Switzerland to Macedonian parents, Gjorgjev originally represented various Swiss youth football teams. However, he switched to the Macedonia national football team and made his debut for them in a friendly 3–1 win over Azerbaijan on 29 May 2016.
