= 2020–21 Grasshopper Club Zurich season =

Grasshopper Club Zurich
2020–21 season
- Chairman: Sky Sun
- Manager: Zoltán Kádár (interim)
- Stadium: Letzigrund
- Challenge League: 1st (promoted)
- Swiss Cup: Quarter-finals
- Top goalscorer: League: Léo Bonatini (11); All: Léo Bonatini (13)
- Highest home attendance: 2'550 vs Wil
- Biggest win: 4–1 vs Aarau; 3–0 vs Wil; 3–0 vs Neuchâtel Xamax
- Biggest defeat: 2–5 vs Kriens
Home colours	Away colours

The 2020–21 Grasshopper Club Zurich season is the club's second consecutive season in the Swiss Challenge League, having been relegated from the 2018–19 Swiss Super League one year earlier, after playing in the top tier for 67 years. The season started on 18 September 2020 and is scheduled to end on 30 May 2021. Grasshopper Club Zurich also participate in the Swiss Cup. The first game was played on 12 September 2020.

== Review and events ==
In April 2020 the club was bought by investors from China. The new owners began to reform the club and renew the squad during the summer break, including the signing of several players from Wolverhampton Wanderers. The English Premier League club is also connected to the Chinese investors. The first game of the season was played in late September 2020, a delay caused by the COVID-19 pandemic in Switzerland.

On May 11, 2021 coach João Carlos Pereira was sacked after three defeats in a row. He was replaced by Zoltán Kádár for the last two games of the season.

Thanks to a 2–1 win against Kriens on the last day of the season, Grasshopper Club Zurich was promoted to the Super League.

== Squad ==
=== Players ===
As of 3 March 2021

No.	Name	Nationality	Position	Date of birth (age)	at GCZ since	Signed from
Goalkeepers
1	Mirko Salvi	(Switzerland) (Italy)	GK	14 February 1994 (age 32)	07/2018	Basel
27	Mateo Matic	(Switzerland) (Croatia)	GK	7 January 1996 (age 30)	01/2016	own youth
36	Marvin Keller	(Switzerland)	GK	3 July 2002 (age 24)	07/2019	own youth
57	Matthias Minder	(Switzerland)	GK	3 February 1993 (age 33)	09/2020	Neuchâtel Xamax
Defenders
2	Oskar Buur	(Denmark)	CB	31 March 1998 (age 28)	01/2021	Wolverhampton (on loan)
4	Miguel Nóbrega	(Portugal)	CB	17 April 2000 (age 26)	09/2020	Benfica (on loan)
5	Aleksandar Cvetković	(Serbia)	CB	4 June 1995 (age 31)	02/2018	Wohlen
20	Marcin Dickenmann	(Switzerland)	CB	14 August 2000 (age 26)	06/2020	own youth
22	Nadjack	(Guinea-Bissau) (Portugal)	CB	6 February 1994 (age 32)	08/2020	Rio Ave
24	Toti	(Portugal) (Guinea-Bissau)	CB	16 January 1999 (age 27)	05/2020	Wolverhampton (on loan)
31	Dominik Schmid	(Switzerland)	CB	10 March 1998 (age 28)	08/2020	Basel
34	Allan Arigoni	(Switzerland)	CB	4 November 1998 (age 28)	07/2018	own youth
44	Elias Mesonero	(Switzerland) (Spain)	CB	27 March 2001 (age 25)	01/2020	own youth
89	Ermir Lenjani	(Albania) (Kosovo)	CB	5 August 1989 (age 37)	09/2020	Sion
Midfielders
8	André Santos	(Portugal)	MF	2 March 1989 (age 37)	08/2020	Belenenses
10	Petar Pusic	(Switzerland) (Croatia)	MF	25 January 1999 (age 27)	02/2017	own youth
14	Connor Ronan	(Republic of Ireland) (Northern Ireland)	MF	6 March 1998 (age 28)	08/2020	Wolverhampton (on loan)
19	Nuno da Silva	(Portugal) (Switzerland)	MF	14 March 1994 (age 32)	02/2021	Thun
21	Ming-yang Yang	(Switzerland) (China)	MF	11 July 1995 (age 31)	08/2017	Wolverhampton
23	Nikola Gjorgjev	(North Macedonia) (Switzerland)	MF	22 August 1997 (age 29)	07/2015	own youth
29	Djibril Diani	(France)	MF	11 February 1998 (age 28)	12/2018	own youth
30	Nuno Pina	(Portugal) (Cape Verde)	MF	31 March 1999 (age 27)	08/2020	ChievoVerona (on loan)
33	Giotto Morandi	(Switzerland)	MF	4 March 1999 (age 27)	06/2019	own youth
47	Fabio Fehr	(Switzerland)	MF	15 January 2000 (age 26)	02/2020	own youth
48	Robin Kalem	(Germany)	MF	14 July 2002 (age 24)	06/2020	own youth
Forwards
3	Léo Bonatini	(Brazil) (Italy)	FW	28 March 1994 (age 32)	09/2020	Wolverhampton (on loan)
7	Oscar Correia	(Switzerland)	FW	28 September 1997 (age 29)	07/2020	Étoile Carouge
9	Shkelqim Demhasaj	(Kosovo) (Switzerland)	FW	19 April 1996 (age 30)	07/2020	Luzern
11	Renat Dadashov	(Azerbaijan) (Germany)	FW	17 May 1999 (age 27)	08/2020	Wolverhampton (on loan)
11	Hicham Acheffay	(Netherlands) (Morocco)	FW	10 August 2000 (age 26)	01/2021	Utrecht
17	Cristian Ponde	(Portugal) (Romania)	FW	26 January 1995 (age 31)	08/2020	Karpaty Lviv
42	Filipe de Carvalho	(Switzerland)	FW	1 December 2003 (age 22)	02/2021	own youth
90	André Ribeiro	(Portugal) (Switzerland)	FW	9 June 1997 (age 29)	02/2021	St. Gallen

Players in italic left the club during the season.

=== Players out on loan ===
Note: Flags indicate national team as defined under FIFA eligibility rules; some limited exceptions apply. Players may hold more than one non-FIFA nationality.

No.	Pos.	Nation	Player
4	DF	SUI	Baba Souare (at Kriens until 30 June 2021)
7	FW	SUI	Oscar Correia (at Étoile Carouge until 30 June 2022)

No.	Pos.	Nation	Player
20	DF	SUI	Marcin Dickenmann (at Wil until 30 June 2021)
29	MF	FRA	Djibril Diani (at Livingston until 30 June 2021)

== Transfers ==
=== In ===
Date	No.	Pos	Player	Transferred from	Fee/notes	Source
30 June 2020	30	MF	(Portugal) Nuno Pina	(Italy) ChievoVerona	Loan	
1 July 2020	7	DF	(Switzerland) Oscar Correia	(Switzerland) Étoile Carouge	Free	
1 July 2020	9	FW	(Kosovo) Shkelqim Demhasaj	(Switzerland) Luzern	Free	
7 August 2020	31	DF	(Switzerland) Dominik Schmid	(Switzerland) Basel	Free	
17 August 2020	21	MF	(Switzerland) Ming-yang Yang	(England) Wolverhampton	Free	
23 August 2020	11	FW	(Azerbaijan) Renat Dadashov	(England) Wolverhampton	Loan	
23 August 2020	14	MF	(Republic of Ireland) Connor Ronan	(England) Wolverhampton	Loan	
25 August 2020	17	FW	(Portugal) Cristian Ponde	(Ukraine) Karpaty Lviv	Free	
28 August 2020	8	MF	(Portugal) André Santos	(Portugal) Belenenses	Free	
29 August 2020	22	DF	(Guinea-Bissau) Nadjack	(Portugal) Rio Ave		
31 August 2020		MF	(Switzerland) Nedim Bajrami	(Italy) Empoli	Return from loan	
4 September 2020	24	DF	(Portugal) Toti	(England) Wolverhampton	Loan	
11 September 2020	89	MF	(Albania) Ermir Lenjani	(Switzerland) Sion	Free	
22 September 2020	3	FW	(Brazil) Léo Bonatini	(England) Wolverhampton	Loan	
30 September 2020	4	DF	(Portugal) Miguel Nóbrega	(Portugal) Benfica	Loan	
31 December 2020		FW	(Switzerland) Amel Rustemoski	(Switzerland) Kriens	Return from loan	
11 January 2021	2	MF	(Denmark) Oskar Buur	(England) Wolverhampton	Loan	
20 January 2021	11	FW	(Netherlands) Hicham Acheffay	(Netherlands) Utrecht		
8 February 2021	19	MF	(Portugal) Nuno da Silva	(Switzerland) Thun		
10 February 2021	90	FW	(Portugal) André Ribeiro	(Switzerland) St. Gallen		

=== Out ===
Date	No.	Pos	Player	Transferred to	Fee/notes	Source
1 July 2020	20	FW	(Switzerland) Danijel Subotić	unattached		
2 August 2020	28	DF	(Switzerland) Andreas Wittwer	(Switzerland) Winterthur		
11 August 2020	10	DF	(Switzerland) Vero Salatić	Retirement	Free	
13 August 2020	13	FW	(Switzerland) Nassim Ben Khalifa	(Tunisia) Espérance Tunis		
23 August 2020	21	MF	(Switzerland) Mersim Asllani	(Switzerland) Lausanne-Ouchy		
24 August 2020	4	DF	(Switzerland) Baba Souare	(Switzerland) Kriens	Loan	
24 August 2020	17	MF	(Switzerland) Oliver Buff	unattached		
24 August 2020	31	FW	(Switzerland) Amel Rustemoski	(Switzerland) Kriens	Loan	
29 August 2020	45	DF	(New Zealand) Nando Pijnaker	(Portugal) Rio Ave		
1 September 2020	9	FW	(Brazil) Mychell Chagas	(China) Nantong Zhiyun	Free	
1 September 2020		MF	(Switzerland) Nedim Bajrami	(Italy) Empoli	€0.5 million	
1 October 2020	11	FW	(Switzerland) Nikola Sukacev	(Serbia) Metalac	Free	
8 October 2020	11	FW	(Azerbaijan) Renat Dadashov	(England) Wolverhampton	Loan ended	
14 January 2021	20	DF	(Switzerland) Marcin Dickenmann	(Switzerland) Wil	Loan	
15 February 2021	29	MF	(France) Djibril Diani	(Scotland) Livingston	Loan	
18 February 2021	7	FW	(Switzerland) Oscar Correia	(Switzerland) Étoile Carouge	Loan	
3 March 2021	21	MF	(Switzerland) Ming-yang Yang	(China) Nantong Zhiyun		

== Coaching staff ==
Current coaching staff

As of 11 May 2021

Position	Name	Since
Manager	(Romania) Zoltán Kádár (interim)	05/2021
Assistant manager	(Switzerland) Marc Hodel (interim)	05/2021
Assistant manager	(Switzerland) Ricardo Cabanas (interim)	05/2021
Assistant manager (athletics)	(Switzerland) Walter Grüter (interim)	05/2021
Assistant manager (goalkeeper)	(Switzerland) Christoph Born	2011

until 11 May 2021

As of 28 November 2020

Position	Name	Since
Manager	(Portugal) João Carlos Pereira	2020
Assistant manager	(Portugal) João Gião	2020
Assistant manager (methodology)	(Portugal) Gilberto Freitas	2020
Assistant manager (individual)	(Portugal) Lino Godinho	2020
Assistant manager (athletics)	(Portugal) Bruno Ferreira	2020
Assistant manager (goalkeeper)	(Switzerland) Christoph Born	2011

== Competitions ==
=== Overview ===
Competition	First match	Last match	Starting round	Final position	Record							
Competition	First match	Last match	Starting round	Final position	Pld	W	D	L	GF	GA	GD	Win %
Challenge League	18 September 2020	20 May 2021	Matchday 1	1st	36	19	8	9	60	43	+17	52.78
Swiss Cup	12 September 2020	14 April 2021	2nd round	Quarter-finals	3	2	0	1	5	3	+2	66.67
Total					39	21	8	10	65	46	+19	53.85

Last updated: 23 May 2021
Source: Soccerway

=== Challenge League ===
Pos	Team	Pld	W	D	L	GF	GA	GD	Pts	Promotion or relegation
1	Grasshoppers (C, P)	36	19	8	9	60	43	+17	65	Promotion to 2021–22 Swiss Super League
2	Thun (Q)	36	19	7	10	57	46	+11	64	Qualification to promotion/relegation play-offs
3	Lausanne-Ouchy	36	15	13	8	57	39	+18	58	
4	Schaffhausen	36	16	10	10	59	46	+13	58	
5	Aarau	36	17	7	12	66	59	+7	58	

Updated to match(es) played on 20 May 2021. Source: Swiss Challenge League
Rules for classification: 1) Points; 2) Goal difference; 3) Goals scored; 4) Head-to-head goal difference; 5) Away goals scored; 6) Draw.
(C) Champions; (P) Promoted; (Q) Qualified for the phase indicated

Kickoff times are in CET

Win Draw Loss

18 September 2020 1	Grasshopper Club Zurich	3–2	Winterthur	Zürich
20:00	Pina 28'; Morandi 37'; Pusic 62'; Gjorgjev (yellow card) 67'; Toti (yellow card) 68'	Report	25' Callà; (yellow card) 44' Doumbia; (yellow card) 59' Schüpbach; 69' (pen.) Buess	Stadium: Letzigrund; Attendance: 1,000; Referee: Luca Piccolo

27 September 2020 2	Chiasso	0–2	Grasshopper Club Zurich	Chiasso
16:00	Hajrizi (yellow card) 48'; Silva (yellow card) 69'	Report	46' Gjorgjev; (yellow card) 81' Pina; 90+1' Bonatini	Stadium: Stadio Comunale; Attendance: 500; Referee: Nico Gianforte

3 October 2020 3	Grasshopper Club Zurich	3–0	Wil	Zürich
19:00	Demhasaj 37', 49'; Morandi (yellow card) 55'; Ronan (yellow card) 69'; Pusic 89'	Report	(yellow card) 44' Kronig; (yellow card) 45' Talabidi; (yellow card) 50' Fazliu; (yellow card) 85' Jones	Stadium: Letzigrund; Attendance: 2,550; Referee: Mirel Turkes

16 October 2020 4	Neuchâtel Xamax	1–0	Grasshopper Club Zurich	Neuchâtel
20:00	Mafouta 11' (yellow card) 46'; Mveng (yellow card) 26'	Report	(yellow card) 10' Schmid; (yellow card) 31' Pina; (yellow card) 78' Cvetković	Stadium: Stade de la Maladière; Attendance: 2,870; Referee: Urs Schnyder

20 October 2020 5	Kriens	5–2	Grasshopper Club Zurich	Kriens
19:30	Yesilçayir 21', 72'; Mulaj 49'; Abubakar 56', 75'	Report	43' Pina; 59' Toti; (yellow card) 68' Cvetković	Stadium: Stadion Kleinfeld; Attendance: 700; Referee: Johannes von Mandach

24 October 2020 6	Grasshopper Club Zurich	2–1	Schaffhausen	Zürich
19:00	Gjorgjev (yellow card) 43' (goal) 45'; Schmid 89'	Report	(yellow card) 36' Lika; (yellow card) 45+1' Rodríguez; 48' Pollero; (yellow card) 62' Bunjaku	Stadium: Letzigrund; Attendance: 2,380; Referee: Fedayi San

29 October 2020 7	Lausanne-Ouchy	1–2	Grasshopper Club Zurich	Lausanne
20:00	Tavares (yellow card) 51' (goal) 53'; Lahiouel (yellow card) 40' (yellow-red card) 65'; Routis (yellow card) 87'; Ndongo (yellow card) 90'	Report	(yellow card) 51' Dickenmann; (yellow card) 65' Kalem; 71' Pina; 87' Bonatini	Stadium: Stade Olympique de la Pontaise; Attendance: 50; Referee: David Huwiler

2 November 2020 8	Grasshopper Club Zurich	1–1	Thun	Zürich
20:00	Pina (yellow card) 54'; Ponde 90+3'	Report	55' (pen.) Fatkič; (yellow card) 68' Dzonlagic; (yellow card) 72' Kablan; (yellow card) 79' Wetz	Stadium: Letzigrund; Attendance: 50; Referee: Adrien Jaccottet

6 November 2020 9	Aarau	Postponed	Grasshopper Club Zurich	Aarau
20:00		Report		Stadium: Stadion Brügglifeld
Note: Called off due to COVID-19 cases in the FC Aarau squad.

20 November 2020 10	Grasshopper Club Zurich	Postponed	Neuchâtel Xamax	Zürich
20:00		Report		Stadium: Letzigrund
Note: Called off due to COVID-19 cases in the Grasshoppers squad.

23 November 2020 9	Aarau	0–1	Grasshopper Club Zurich	Aarau
20:00	Balaj (yellow card) 72'	Report	31' André Santos; (yellow card) 90' Matic	Stadium: Stadion Brügglifeld; Attendance: 50; Referee: Tobias Thies

27 November 2020 11	Wil	1–1	Grasshopper Club Zurich	Wil
20:00	Brahimi 23'; Fazliu (yellow card) 42'; Zumberi (yellow card) 87'	Report	(yellow card) 33' Morandi; 83' Ponde	Stadium: IGP Arena; Attendance: 50; Referee: Stefan Horisberger

4 December 2020 12	Grasshopper Club Zurich	2–0	Kriens	Zürich
20:00	Pusic 35'; André Santos (yellow card) 61'; Morandi 79'	Report		Stadium: Letzigrund; Attendance: 50; Referee: Anojen Kanagasingam

7 December 2020 10	Grasshopper Club Zurich	3–0	Neuchâtel Xamax	Zürich
20:00	Demhasaj 39'; Ronan 90+1'; Gjorgjev 90+3'	Report	(yellow card) 2' Mafouta; (yellow card) 56' (yellow-red card) 81' Djuric	Stadium: Letzigrund; Attendance: 50; Referee: Luca Cibelli

11 December 2020 13	Thun	3–1	Grasshopper Club Zurich	Thun
20:00	Chihadeh (yellow card) 20'; Kablan 31'; Wetz (yellow card) 49'; Havenaar 85'; Salanović 88'	Report	(yellow card) 70' Morandi; 73' (pen.) Ponde	Stadium: Stockhorn Arena; Attendance: 15; Referee: Sven Wolfensberger

15 December 2020 14	Grasshopper Club Zurich	2–1	Chiasso	Zürich
20:00	Demhasaj 20' (pen.) 90+3'; Fehr (yellow card) 86'	Report	(yellow card) 2' Pasquarelli; 55' Almeida; (yellow card) 80' Malula	Stadium: Letzigrund; Attendance: 0 Referee: Mirel Turkes

18 December 2020 15	Schaffhausen	2–1	Grasshopper Club Zurich	Schaffhausen
20:00	Prtajin 32'; Neitzke (yellow card) 39'; Mozzone 72'; Da Costa (yellow card) 90+2'	Report	(yellow card) 32' Pusic; 55' (yellow card) 90+4' André Santos; (yellow card) 66' Schmid	Stadium: LIPO Park; Attendance: 5 Referee: Esther Staubli

22 January 2021 16	Grasshopper Club Zurich	2–0	Lausanne-Ouchy	Zürich
20:00	Cvetković (yellow card) 29'; Schmid (yellow card) 44'; Pusic 54'; Fehr (yellow card) 88'; Gjorgjev 90+1'	Report	(yellow card) 73' Routis	Stadium: Letzigrund; Attendance: 5 Referee: Alessandro Dudic

29 January 2021 17	Grasshopper Club Zurich	postponed	Aarau	Zürich
20:00		Report		Stadium: Letzigrund
Note: Called off due to unplayable pitch caused by heavy rain.

2 February 2021 18	Winterthur	postponed	Grasshopper Club Zurich	Winterthur
20:00		Report		Stadium: Stadion Schützenwiese
Note: Called off due to unplayable pitch caused by heavy rain.

6 February 2021 19	Grasshopper Club Zurich	1–1	Chiasso	Zürich
18:15	Pusic (yellow card) 35'; Ponde 73'	Report	(yellow card) 1' Hajrizi; (yellow card) 28' Bahloul; (yellow card) 55' Conus; 78' (o.g.) Schmid	Stadium: Letzigrund; Attendance: 5 Referee: Nico Gianforte

9 February 2021 18	Winterthur	2–3	Grasshopper Club Zurich	Winterthur
20:00	Pepsi 22' (yellow card) 83'; Arnold 44'; Baak (red card) 74'	Report	37' Toti; 47' Gjorgjev; (yellow card) 51' Lenjani; 84' Demhasaj	Stadium: Stadion Schützenwiese; Attendance: 5 Referee: Lukas Fähndrich

12 February 2021 20	Thun	0–2	Grasshopper Club Zurich	Thun
20:00	Dzonlagic (yellow card) 19'; Schwizer (yellow card) 24'	Report	40' Schmid; 72' Cvetković; (yellow card) 90+1' Matic	Stadium: Stockhorn Arena; Attendance: 5 Referee: Nikolaj Hänni

16 February 2021 17	Grasshopper Club Zurich	2–1	Aarau	Zürich
18:00	Nuno da Silva (yellow card) 26'; Bonatini 49'; Demhasaj 62'; Fehr (yellow card) 66'; Arigoni (yellow card) 90+1'	Report	12' Stojilković; (yellow card) 37' Conus; (yellow card) 57' Jäckle	Stadium: Letzigrund; Attendance: 5 Referee: Sven Wolfensberger

19 February 2021 21	Wil	1–1	Grasshopper Club Zurich	Wil
20:00	Krasniqi (yellow card) 35'; Tushi 58'; Fazliu (yellow card) 82'; Kamber (yellow card) 86'	Report	(yellow card) 62' Schmid; 83' Ponde; (yellow card) 90+5' Cvetković	Stadium: IGP Arena; Attendance: 5 Referee: Luca Cibelli

27 February 2021 22	Grasshopper Club Zurich	1–1	Schaffhausen	Zürich
18:15	Pina (yellow card) 35'; André Santos (yellow card) 64'; Léo 71'	Report	(yellow card) 26' Lika; 65' Pollero; (yellow card) 89' Mozzone	Stadium: Letzigrund; Attendance: 5 Referee: Stefan Horisberger

2 March 2021 23	Lausanne-Ouchy	1–1	Grasshopper Club Zurich	Lausanne
20:00	Mbenza 21'; Routis (yellow card) 36'; Amdouni (yellow card) 39'; Asllani (yellow card) 77'	Report	18' Léo; (yellow card) 61' André Santos	Stadium: Stade Olympique de la Pontaise; Attendance: 5 Referee: Sven Wolfensberger

5 March 2021 24	Grasshopper Club Zurich	0–1	Winterthur	Zürich
20:00		Report	(yellow card) 86' Alves; 89' Schüpbach	Stadium: Letzigrund; Attendance: 5 Referee: Nico Gianforte

12 March 2021 25	Kriens	1–2	Grasshopper Club Zurich	Kriens
20:00	Bürgisser (yellow card) 53'; Patrick Luan 75'	Report	7' Demhasaj; (yellow card) 35' Cvetković; 53' (pen.) Léo	Stadium: Stadion Kleinfeld; Attendance: 5 Referee: Johannes von Mandach

19 March 2021 26	Grasshopper Club Zurich	4–1	Aarau	Zürich
20:00	Pusic 6', 35'; Arigoni 17'; Ponde (yellow card) 87'; Gjorgjev 90+2'	Report	47' Stojilković; (yellow card) 90+3' Aratore	Stadium: Letzigrund; Attendance: 5 Referee: Fedayi San

3 April 2021 27	Grasshopper Club Zurich	1–4	Neuchâtel Xamax	Zürich
18:15	Ponde (yellow card) 25'; Da Silva (yellow card) 50'; Schmid (yellow card) 55' (yellow-red card) 68'; Ribeiro 89'; Arigoni (yellow card) 90+1'	Report	(yellow card) 2' Epitaux; (yellow card) 6' Gomes; 13', 45' (pen.), 54' Mafouta; 83' Mbock	Stadium: Letzigrund; Attendance: 5 Referee: David Schärli

9 April 2021 28	Schaffhausen	0–2	Grasshopper Club Zurich	Schaffhausen
20:00	Krasniqi (yellow card) 41'; Maouche (yellow card) 31'; Mujčić (yellow card) 73'; Pollero (yellow card) 88'	Report	16' (yellow card) 52' Da Silva; 39' Gjorgjev; (yellow card) 41' Cvetković; (yellow card) 41' Santos; (yellow card) 59' Pusic; (yellow card) 72' Toti; (yellow card) 87' Ponde	Stadium: LIPO Park; Attendance: 5 Referee: Luca Cibelli

17 April 2021 29	Grasshopper Club Zurich	1–0	Wil	Zürich
18:15	Lenjani (yellow card) 44'; Bonatini 76'; Cvetković (red card) 84'	Report	(yellow card) 27' Kronig; (yellow card) 44' Brahimi	Stadium: Letzigrund; Attendance: 5 Referee: Luca Piccolo

20 April 2021 30	Chiasso	2–2	Grasshopper Club Zurich	Chiasso
19:00	Maccoppi (yellow card) 10' (goal) 29'; Silva (yellow card) 18'; Antoniazzi (yellow card) 34'; Bnou Marzouk 82' (pen.)	Report	5' (pen.) Bonatini; (yellow card) 81' Toti; (yellow card) 85' Schmid; 90+4' Pusic	Stadium: Stadio Comunale; Attendance: 100; Referee: David Schärli

23 April 2021 31	Grasshopper Club Zurich	3–1	Thun	Zürich
20:00	Toti (yellow card) 20'; Schmid 43'; Lenjani 51'; Pusic 62'; Cvetković (yellow card) 90+1'	Report	7' Chihadeh; (yellow card) 31' Dos Santos; (yellow card) 46' Kablan; (yellow card) 71' Rüdlin; (yellow card) 88' Breitenmoser	Stadium: Letzigrund; Attendance: 100; Referee: Esther Staubli

30 April 2021 32	Aarau	2–1	Grasshopper Club Zurich	Aarau
20:00	Hammerich (yellow card) 65'; Balaj 58'; Jäckle (yellow card) 81'; Almeida 86' (yellow card) 87' (yellow-red card) 90+1'	Report	58' Demhasaj	Stadium: Stadion Brügglifeld; Attendance: 100; Referee: Fedayi San

7 May 2021 33	Grasshopper Club Zurich	1–2	Lausanne-Ouchy	Zürich
20:00	Léo 20' (pen.); Demhasaj (yellow card) 22'; Schmid (yellow card) 49'; Da Silva (yellow card) 80'	Report	(yellow card) 40' Gaillard; 83' Amdouni; 85' Asllani; (yellow card) 90+2' Mbenza	Stadium: Letzigrund; Attendance: 100; Referee: Luca Cibelli

10 May 2021 34	Winterthur	2–1	Grasshopper Club Zurich	Winterthur
20:00	Kriz (yellow card) 18'; Ramizi 54'; Gantenbein 66'	Report	(yellow card) 38' Gjorgjev; (red card) 62' Toti; (yellow card) 72' Da Silva; (yellow card) 72' Demhasaj; 83' Pusic	Stadium: Stadion Schützenwiese; Attendance: 100; Referee: Adrien Jaccottet

14 May 2021 35	Neuchâtel Xamax	1–1	Grasshopper Club Zurich	Neuchâtel
20:00	Nuzzolo 26'; Gomes (yellow card) 50'	Report	29' Léo; (yellow card) 58' Lenjani; (yellow card) 90' Mesonero	Stadium: Stade de la Maladière; Attendance: 100; Referee: Stefan Horisberger

20 May 2021 36	Grasshopper Club Zurich	2–1	Kriens	Zürich
20:00	Demhasaj 13'; Bonatini 41'; Toti (yellow card) 85'; Lenjani (yellow card) 90+2'	Report	68' Luan; (yellow card) 82' Urtić	Stadium: Letzigrund; Attendance: 100; Referee: Nikolaj Hänni

=== Swiss Cup ===
Kickoff times are in CET

Win Draw Loss

12 September 2020 2nd Round	Lausanne-Ouchy (Vaud)	1–2	(Canton of Zurich) Grasshopper Club Zurich	Lausanne
16:30	Ndongo 65'	Report	45' Kalem; 66' Demhasaj	Stadium: Stade Juan-Antonio-Samaranch; Attendance: 800

24 February 2021 Round of 16	Grasshopper Club Zurich (Canton of Zurich)	2–0	(Vaud) Lausanne-Sport	Zürich
17:30	Léo 69'; Ponde 82'	Report		Stadium: Letzigrund; Attendance: 0 Referee: Alain Bieri

14 April 2021 Quarter-finals	Grasshopper Club Zurich (Canton of Zurich)	1–2	(Canton of St. Gallen) St. Gallen	Zürich
18:00	Léo 90+3'	Report	5' Görtler; 18' Ruiz	Stadium: Letzigrund; Attendance: 0 Referee: Fedayi San

=== Pre-season and friendlies ===
Win Draw Loss

25 August 2020	Türkgücü München (Germany)	1–0	(Switzerland) Grasshopper Club Zurich	Weingarten, Germany
19:00 CEST (UTC+2)	Boere 11' (pen.)	Report		Stadium: Lindenhofstadion; Attendance: 0

29 August 2020	Grasshopper Club Zurich (Switzerland)	1–1	(Switzerland) Luzern	Niederhasli, Switzerland
18:30 CEST (UTC+2)	Pusic 38'	Report	70' Arqués	Stadium: GC/Campus; Attendance: 300

5 September 2020	Servette FC (Switzerland)	cancelled	(Switzerland) Grasshopper Club Zurich	Montreux, Switzerland
16:00 CEST (UTC+2)		Report		Stadium: Stade Eugéne Parlier; Attendance: 0
Note: Called off due to COVID-19 cases in the Grasshoppers squad.

9 October 2020	Grasshopper Club Zurich (Switzerland)	1–2	(Switzerland) Lausanne-Sport	Niederhasli, Switzerland
15:00 CEST (UTC+2)	Pina 30'	Report	10', 63' Pedro Brazão	Stadium: GC/Campus; Attendance: 0

9 January 2021	Servette FC (Switzerland)	cancelled	(Switzerland) Grasshopper Club Zurich	Fribourg, Switzerland
15:00 CET (UTC+1)		Report		Stadium: Stade Universitaire Saint-Léonard
Note: Called off due to frozen pitch.

13 January 2021	Luzern (Switzerland)	cancelled	(Switzerland) Grasshopper Club Zurich	Kriens, Switzerland
14:00 CET (UTC+1)		Report		Stadium: Stadion Kleinfeld
Note: Called off due to four COVID-19 cases in the FC Luzern squad.

16 January 2021	Schaffhausen (Switzerland)	0–1	(Switzerland) Grasshopper Club Zurich	Schaffhausen, Switzerland
15:00 CET (UTC+1)		Report	69' Pusic	Stadium: LIPO Park; Attendance: 0

16 January 2021	Grasshopper Club Zurich (Switzerland)	3–2	Austria Lustenau	Niederhasli, Switzerland
15:00 CET (UTC+1)	Filipe Carvalho 28', 70'; Correia 61'	Report	84' Steinwender; 88' Bertaccini	Stadium: GC/Campus; Attendance: 0

27 March 2021	Grasshopper Club Zurich (Switzerland)	2–2	(Switzerland) Rapperswil-Jona	Niederhasli, Switzerland
15:00 CET (UTC+1)	André Santos 20'; Kalem 70'	Report	15' Casciato; 56' Kubli	Stadium: GC/Campus; Attendance: 0

== Statistics ==
=== Goalscorers ===
Rank	No.	Pos	Nat	Name	Challenge League	Swiss Cup	Total
1	3	FW	(Brazil)	Léo Bonatini	11	2	13
2	9	FW	(Kosovo)	Shkelqim Demhasaj	10	1	11
3	10	MF	(Switzerland)	Petar Pusic	9	0	9
4	23	MF	(North Macedonia)	Nikola Gjorgjev	7	0	7
5	17	FW	(Portugal)	Cristian Ponde	5	1	6
6	30	MF	(Portugal)	Nuno Pina	3	0	3
6	31	DF	(Switzerland)	Dominik Schmid	2	0	2
8	8	MF	(Portugal)	André Santos	2	0	2
8	24	DF	(Portugal)	Toti	2	0	2
8	33	MF	(Switzerland)	Giotto Morandi	2	0	2
11	5	DF	(Serbia)	Aleksandar Cvetković	1	0	1
11	14	MF	(Republic of Ireland)	Connor Ronan	1	0	1
11	19	MF	(Portugal)	Nuno da Silva	1	0	1
11	34	DF	(Switzerland)	Allan Arigoni	1	0	1
11	48	MF	(Germany)	Robin Kalem	0	1	1
11	89	DF	(Albania)	Ermir Lenjani	1	0	1
11	90	FW	(Portugal)	André Ribeiro	1	0	1
Own goals					0	0	0
Totals					60	5	65

Last updated: 20 May 2021
Source: Competitions
