= Dominik Schmid (footballer, born 1998) =

Swiss footballer (born 1998)

- Schmid with Red Bull Salzburg in 2026

Personal information
- Full name: Dominik Robin Schmid
- Date of birth: 10 March 1998 (age 28)
- Place of birth: Rheinfelden, Switzerland
- Height: 1.82 m (6 ft 0 in)
- Position: Left-back

Team information
- Current team: Red Bull Salzburg
- Number: 31

Youth career
- 2007–2009: FC Kaiseraugst
- 2009–2015: Basel

Senior career*
Years	Team	Apps	(Gls)
2015–2016	Basel U-21	20	(3)
2016–2020	Basel	4	(0)
2018–2019	→ Lausanne-Sport (loan)	23	(0)
2019–2020	→ FC Wil (loan)	38	(1)
2020–2023	Grasshopper	100	(4)
2023–2026	Basel	105	(9)
2026–	Red Bull Salzburg	9	(0)

International career
2015	Switzerland U17	1	(0)
2015–2016	Switzerland U18	3	(0)
2016	Switzerland U19	7	(1)
2017–2019	Switzerland U20	11	(1)
2017–2019	Switzerland U21	4	(0)
- * Club domestic league appearances and goals as of 25 October 2026

Dominik Robin Schmid (born 10 March 1998) is a Swiss professional footballer who plays as a left-back for Austrian Bundesliga club Red Bull Salzburg.

== Club career ==
=== Youth career ===
Schmid started his youth football with FC Kaiseraugst but transferred early to Basel. He advanced through their youth system until 2015 when he joined their U-21 team.

=== Basel ===
On 10 March 2017 (his 19th Birthday he signed a three-and-a-half-year professional contract and joined their first team during their 2016–17 season under head coach Urs Fischer. He played his domestic league debut in their first team in the away game in the Letzigrund on 28 May 2017 as Basel won 3–1 against Grasshopper.

Under trainer Urs Fischer Schmid played just that one League game but the team won the Swiss Super League championship at the end of the 2016–17 Super League season. For the club this was the eighth title in a row and their 20th championship title in total. They also won the Swiss Cup for the twelfth time, which meant they had won the double for the sixth time in the club's history.

Schmid started their 2017–18 season with Basel's first team and had three league appearances in the early stages, but the only game where he played the full 90 minutes was the 2017–18 Swiss Cup match against amateur club FC Wettswil-Bonstetten. To gain more match experience he played in the U-21 team. During the winter break he was loaned to Lausanne-Sport, where he signed a contract over 18 months. Lausanne suffered relegation and Schmid had only been playing sporadically, so the loan was ended early after just 12 months. Then, on 15 January 2019. Schmid was loaned out to FC Wil in the Challenge League for the rest of the season. With Wil Schmid played regularly and so the loan was extended another six months. Following this loan period Schmid left Basel. During his time with the club, Schmid played a total of 14 games for Basel scoring one goal. Four of these games were in the Swiss Super League, one in the Swiss Cup and nine were friendly games. He scored his one goal during the test games.

=== Grasshopper ===
In August 2020, Schmid transferred to Grasshopper in the Swiss Challenge League, signing a three-year contract. He quickly became an integral part of the club and was instrumental in helping the record champion achieve promotion back to the Swiss Super League. On 24 November 2021, he extended his contract until 2024. He was voted Player of the Season by the fans of Grasshopper for the 2021–22 season. On 16 April 2023, he played his 100th game for Grasshoppers, a 1–3 home loss to Sion, where he sadly had to be substituted at half time due to a head injury.

=== Return to Basel ===
On 20 July 2023, he returned to Basel for an undisclosed fee. He signs a three-year contract with his boyhood club. He quickly reestablished himself as a leading figure in a struggling Basel side and started nearly every game of the 2023–24 season, while also scoring two goals and supplying six assists.

On 9 July 2024, he extended his contract for a further season until summer 2027, just one year after joining, to quell rumors of a transfer abroad.

== International career ==
Schmid has played in all youth teams for Switzerland.

On 16 March 2023, he received his first call up to the Switzerland national football team in preparation for their upcoming UEFA Euro qualifying campaign.

== Career statistics ==
As of match played 25 October 2026

Appearances and goals by club, season and competition
Club	Season	League			National cup (Note: Includes Swiss Cup, Austrian Cup)		Continental		Total	
Club	Season	Division	Apps	Goals	Apps	Goals	Apps	Goals	Apps	Goals
Basel	2016–17	Swiss Super League	1	0	0	0	0	0	1	0
Basel	2017–18	Swiss Super League	3	0	0	0	0	0	3	0
Basel	2018–19	Swiss Super League	0	0	0	0	0	0	0	0
Basel	2019–20	Swiss Super League	0	0	0	0	0	0	0	0
Basel	Total		4	0	0	0	0	0	4	0
Lausanne-Sport (loan)	2017–18	Swiss Super League	12	0	0	0	—		12	0
Lausanne-Sport (loan)	2018–19	Swiss Challenge League	11	0	1	1	—		12	1
Lausanne-Sport (loan)	Total		23	0	1	1	—		24	1
FC Wil (loan)	2018–19	Swiss Challenge League	17	1	0	0	—		17	1
FC Wil (loan)	2019–20	Swiss Challenge League	21	0	1	0	—		22	0
FC Wil (loan)	Total		38	1	1	0	—		39	1
Grasshoppers	2020–21	Swiss Challenge League	34	3	2	0	—		36	3
Grasshoppers	2021–22	Swiss Super League	32	1	1	0	—		33	1
Grasshoppers	2022–23	Swiss Super League	34	0	1	0	—		35	0
Grasshoppers	Total		100	4	4	0	—		104	44
Basel	2023–24	Swiss Super League	35	2	3	0	2 (Note: Appearance(s) in UEFA Europa Conference League)	0	40	2
Basel	2024–25	Swiss Super League	35	4	5	0	—		40	4
Basel	2025–26	Swiss Super League	35	3	3	0	9 (Note: Two appearances in UEFA Champions League, seven appearances in UEFA Europa League)	0	47	3
Basel	Total		105	9	11	0	11	0	128	9
Red Bull Salzburg	2026–27	Austrian Bundesliga	9	0	1	0	7 (Note: Appearances in UEFA Europa League)	0	17	0
Career total			279	14	18	1	18	0	315	15

== Honours ==
FC Basel

- Swiss Super League: 2016–17, 2024–25
- Swiss Cup: 2016–17, 2024–25

Grasshopper Club Zürich

- Swiss Challenge League: 2020–21
- Player of the Season: 2021–22
