= Oskar Buur =

Danish footballer (born 1998)

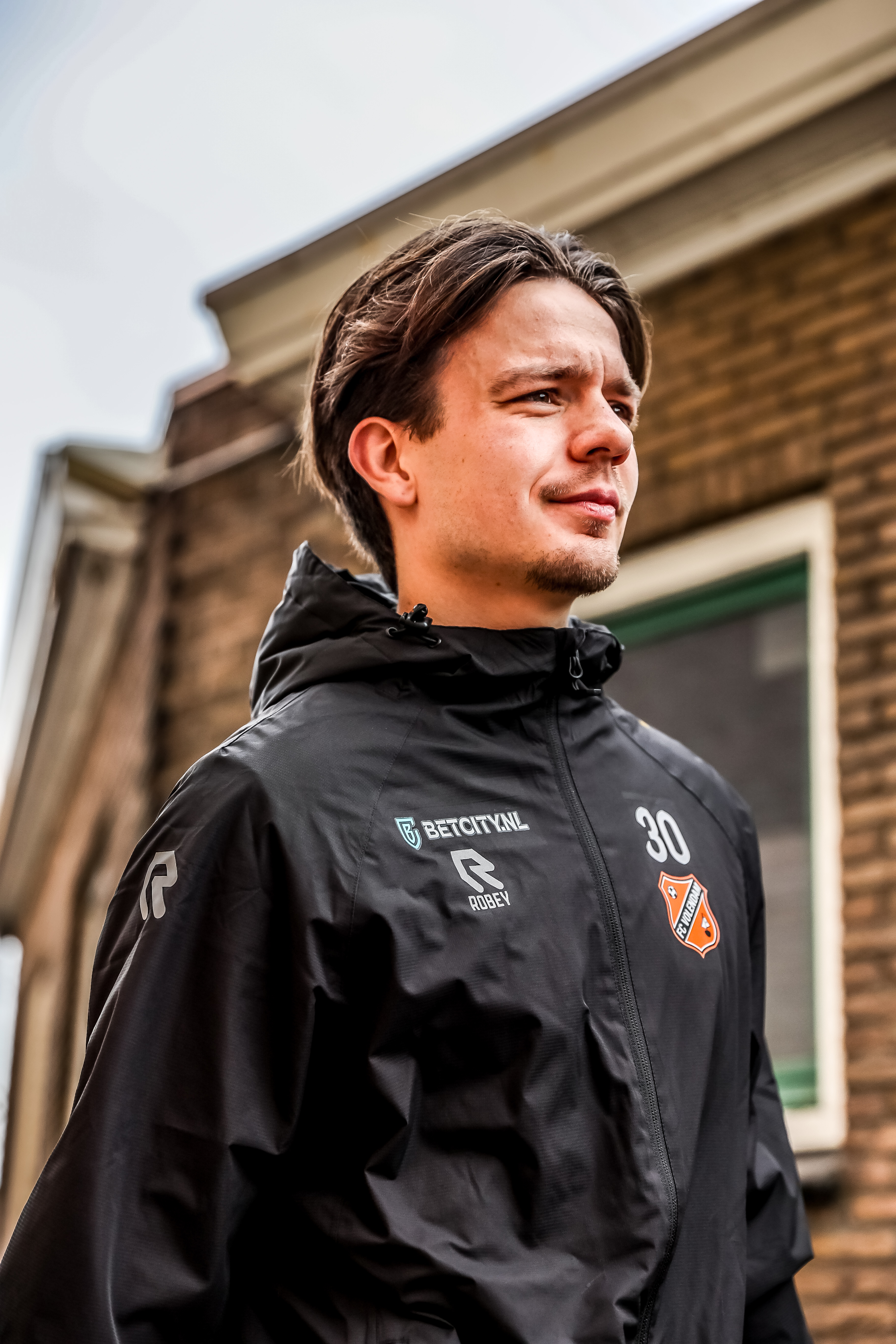

Personal information
- Full name: Oskar Buur Rasmussen
- Date of birth: 31 March 1998 (age 28)
- Place of birth: Skanderborg, Denmark
- Height: 1.80 m (5 ft 11 in)
- Position: Right-back

Team information
- Current team: Lyngby
- Number: 2

Youth career
- 2002–2011: FC Skanderborg
- 2011–2015: AGF

Senior career*
Years	Team	Apps	(Gls)
2015–2017	AGF	10	(0)
2017	Brabrand	0	(0)
2017–2022	Wolverhampton Wanderers	2	(1)
2021	→ Grasshoppers (loan)	10	(0)
2022–2024	Volendam	42	(1)
2025–	Lyngby	38	(2)

International career
2013–2014	Denmark U16	7	(0)
2014	Denmark U17	9	(0)
2016	Denmark U18	3	(0)
2016–2017	Denmark U19	7	(1)
- * Club domestic league appearances and goals as of 2 June 2026

Oskar Buur Rasmussen (born 31 March 1998) is a Danish professional footballer who plays as a right-back for Danish Superliga club Lyngby Boldklub.

== Youth career ==
Buur began playing football at the age of four, inspired by his older brother. He started his youth career at FC Skanderborg before joining the academy of AGF as an under-14 player.

== Club career ==
=== AGF ===
At 16, Buur was promoted to AGF's under-19 squad and soon began training with the first team due to an injury crisis. In November 2014, he was awarded the Martin Jørgensen Talent Prize, named after the former Danish international, who praised Buur's humility and respect towards senior players.

On 25 February 2015, Buur signed a professional contract with AGF and was promoted to the first-team squad after featuring in several pre-season friendlies.

He made his senior debut on 15 March 2015 in a Danish 1st Division match against AB, playing the full 90 minutes at the age of 16. Buur became the sixth-youngest player to make a debut in the Danish Superliga.

Despite his early breakthrough, he made only 10 league appearances for AGF and departed the club in the summer of 2017 after his contract was not renewed.

=== Brabrand IF ===
On 22 July 2017, Buur signed with Brabrand IF of the Danish 1st Division. However, he only featured in a few friendly matches and left the club shortly thereafter.

=== Wolverhampton Wanderers ===
On 24 August 2017, Buur signed for then-English Championship club Wolverhampton Wanderers on a two-year deal after an extended trial at the club. He made his first team debut at home to Bristol Rovers on 19 September in the EFL Cup. Buur played the first 90 minutes, and was substituted in the break between normal time and extra time. The game was 0–0 after 90 minutes. Wolves went on to win 1–0 after extra-time. He made his league debut for Wolves, and scored his first professional goal, after coming on as a substitute in a 2–2 draw with Hull City on 3 April 2018, en route to the team winning promotion to the Premier League.

On 12 December 2019, Buur made his first appearance in a UEFA club competition, appearing in Wolves' final 2019–20 UEFA Europa League group stage game against Beşiktaş at Molineux. He provided the assist for Diogo Jota's hat-trick goal. He made his Premier League debut on 14 September 2020, appearing as a second-half substitute in a 2–0 away win against Sheffield United.

In February 2020, Buur signed a new deal with Wolves which lasts until the summer of 2023.

On 31 January 2022, it was confirmed that Buur's contract with Wolves had been terminated.

==== Loan to Grasshoppers ====
On 11 January 2021, Buur joined Grasshoppers in the Swiss Challenge League on an 18-month loan deal. He made 10 appearances for the club, on their way to winning the 2020–21 Swiss Challenge League title.

=== Volendam ===
On 8 February 2022, Buur joined Dutch Eerste Divisie club FC Volendam on a deal until June 2024. He left the club at the end of his contract in the summer of 2024.

=== Lyngby ===
On 23 January 2025, it was confirmed that Buur, after a successful trial period, moved to Danish Superliga club Lyngby Boldklub on a deal until June 2026. Despite relegation to the 2025-26 Danish 1st Division, it was confirmed in July 2025 that Buur had extended his contract, which now ran until June 2027.

== Career statistics ==
As of match played 4 April 2021

Appearances and goals by club, season and competition
Club	Season	League			FA Cup		League Cup		Europe		Total	
Club	Season	Division	Apps	Goals	Apps	Goals	Apps	Goals	Apps	Goals	Apps	Goals
Wolverhampton Wanderers	2017–18	Championship	1	1	0	0	1	0	—		2	1
Wolverhampton Wanderers	2018–19	Premier League	0	0	0	0	0	0	—		0	0
Wolverhampton Wanderers	2019–20	Premier League	0	0	1	0	0	0	1 (Note: Appearance(s) in UEFA Europa League)	0	2	0
Wolverhampton Wanderers	2020–21	Premier League	1	0	0	0	1	0	—		2	0
Grasshoppers (loan)	2020–21	Challenge League	10	0	0	0	0	0	—		10	0
Volendam	2021–22	Eerste Divisie	5	0	0	0	0	0	—		5	0
Career total			17	1	1	0	2	0	1	0	21	1

== Honours ==
Wolverhampton Wanderers

- Football League/EFL Championship: 2017–18
- Premier League Asia Trophy: 2019
- Premier League 2 - Division 2: 2018-19

Grasshopper Club Zürich

- Swiss Challenge League: 2020–21

Lyngby

- Danish 1st Division: 2025–26
