= Rodrigo Pollero =

Uruguayan footballer (born 1996)

Personal information
- Full name: Rodrigo Pollero López
- Date of birth: 14 September 1996 (age 30)
- Place of birth: San José de Mayo, Uruguay
- Height: 1.86 m (6 ft 1 in)
- Position: Forward

Team information
- Current team: Deportivo Táchira
- Number: 9

Youth career
- Peñarol

Senior career*
Years	Team	Apps	(Gls)
2016–2018	Peñarol	0	(0)
2016	→ Cerro Largo (loan)	9	(4)
2017	→ Sud América (loan)	27	(5)
2018	→ Arsenal de Sarandí (loan)	3	(0)
2019–2020	Chiasso	28	(7)
2020–2022	Schaffhausen	32	(19)
2021–2022	→ Zürich (loan)	6	(2)
2022	→ Lausanne-Sport (loan)	15	(1)
2022–2025	Bellinzona	58	(18)
2024–2025	→ Brusque (loan)	27	(2)
2025	River Plate Montevideo	10	(5)
2026–	Deportivo Táchira	6	(2)
- * Club domestic league appearances and goals as of 10 March 2026

Rodrigo Pollero López (born 14 September 1996) is a Uruguayan professional footballer who plays as a forward for Deportivo Táchira.

== Career ==
A youth academy product of Peñarol, Pollero made his professional debut on 10 September 2016 while being on loan at Cerro Largo. He came on as a 59th minute substitute for Walter Cubilla in 3–0 win against Central Español and scored a goal six minutes later.

Swiss club Chiasso announced the signing of Pollero in January 2019. On 8 September 2020, Schaffhausen announced the signing of Pollero along with fellow Uruguayans Emiliano Mozzone and Guillermo Padula. With 19 goals from 32 matches, he finished 2020–21 season as league top scorer.

On 15 July 2021, Zürich announced the signing of Pollero on a season long loan deal with option to buy. On 25 January 2022, he joined Lausanne-Sport on loan until the end of the season.

In July 2022, Pollero joined Bellinzona. In July 2024, he joined Brazilian club Brusque on a one-year loan deal.
