= FC Biel-Bienne =

Association football team in Biel/Bienne, Switzerland

Biel-Bienne
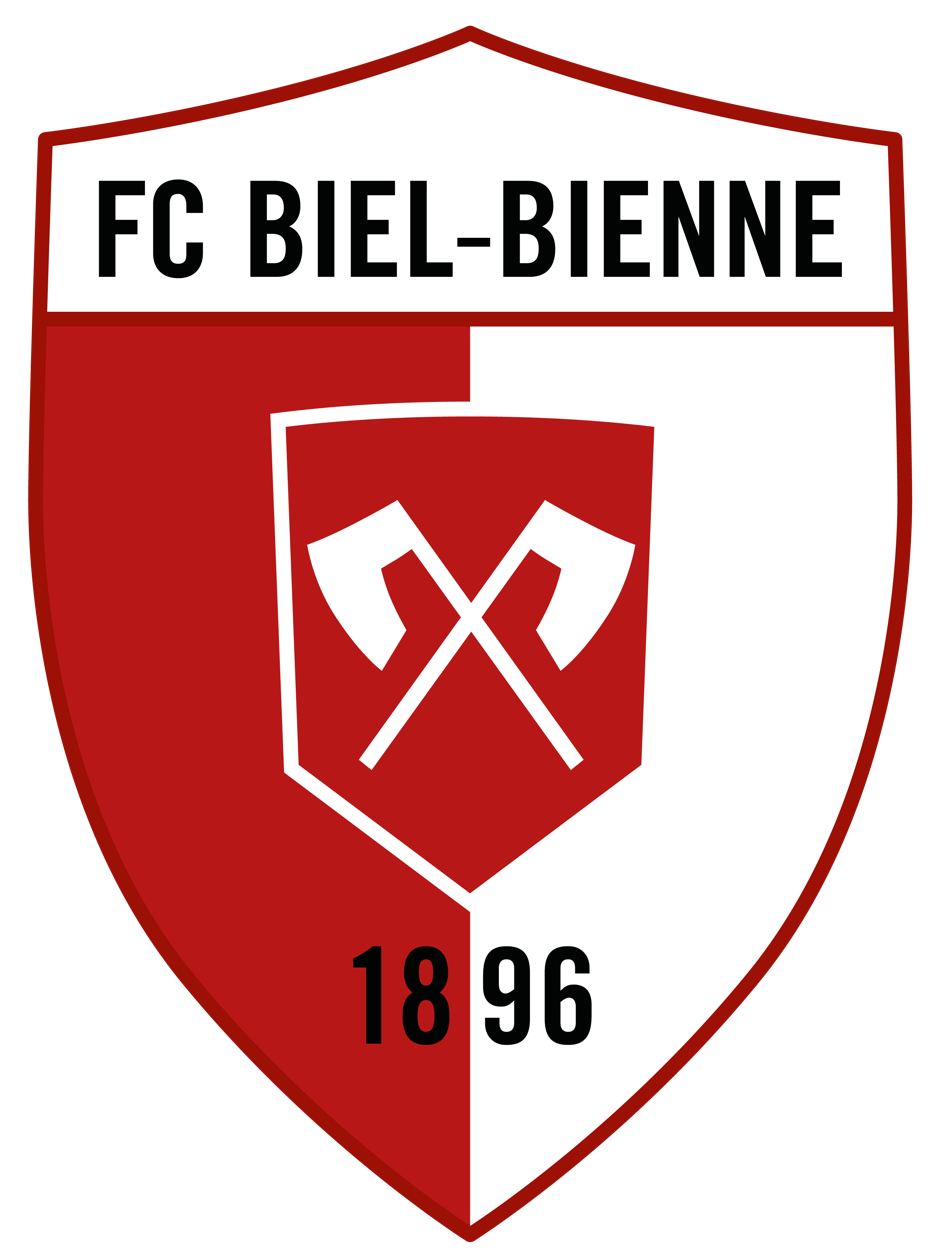
- Full name: Fussballclub Biel/Football Club Bienne
- Founded: 13 November 1896; 130 years ago
- Ground: Tissot Arena
- Capacity: 5,200
- President: Dietmar Faes
- Head coach: Samir Chaibeddra
- League: Promotion League
- 2024–25: 3rd of 18
- Website: www.fcbiel-bienne.ch
Home colours	Away colours

FC Biel-Bienne is a Swiss association football club based in Biel/Bienne. They currently play in the Swiss Promotion League, the third tier of Swiss football.

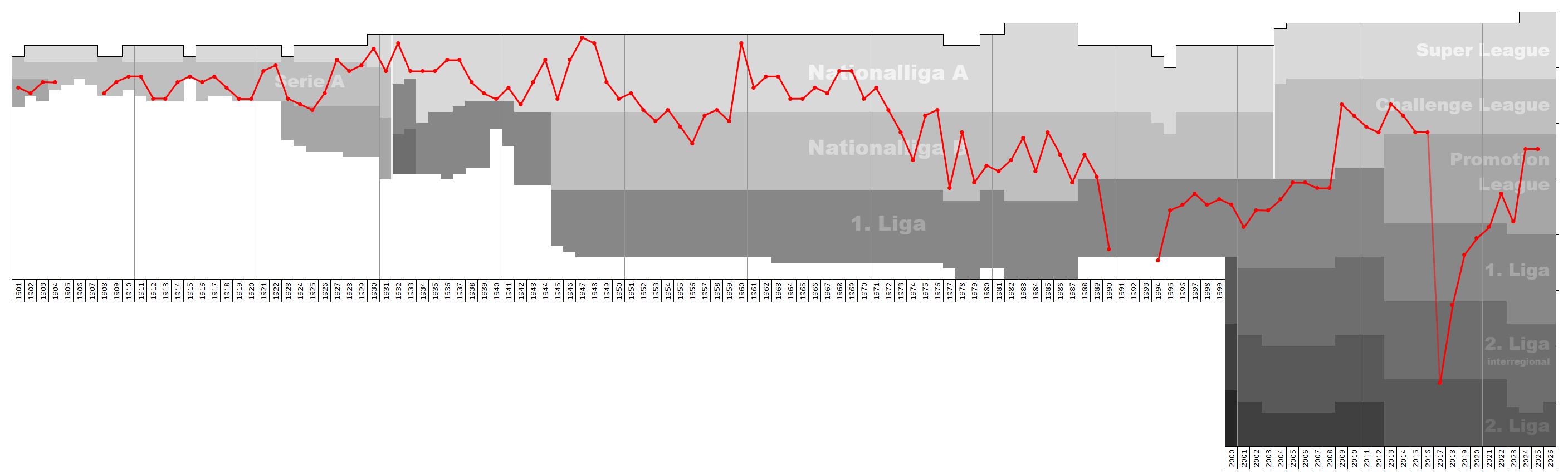
Chart of FC Biel-Bienne table positions in the Swiss football league system

== Honours ==
- Swiss championship
  - Champions: 1946–47
  - Runners-up: 1947–48, 1959–60
- Swiss Cup
  - Runners-up: 1960–61, 2024–25

== Stadium ==
FC Biel-Bienne play their home games at the multi-purpose Tissot Arena.

== Current squad ==
As of 20 September 2026

Note: Flags indicate national team as defined under FIFA eligibility rules; some limited exceptions apply. Players may hold more than one non-FIFA nationality.

No.	Pos.	Nation	Player
1	GK	SUI	Nico Stucki
3	MF	SUI	Levy Maltet
5	DF	SUI	Matthew Mäder
6	DF	SUI	Alton Kadriu
7	MF	SUI	Sébastien Moulin
8	MF	SUI	Nikolai Maurer
9	FW	PLE	Saleh Chihadeh
10	MF	ALB	Enis Asani
11	FW	SUI	Tresor Samba
12	GK	SUI	Ilias Tebib
14	FW	FRA	Hamilton Beltran
17	DF	SUI	Uros Vasic
19	DF	SUI	Guélor Samba

No.	Pos.	Nation	Player
20	MF	SUI	Noah Jakob
22	DF	BIH	Marko Kuzamanovic
23	FW	SUI	Ange Dakouri
24	DF	SUI	Lion De Oliveira
25	MF	SUI	Perceval Essay
28	MF	FRA	Anthony de Freitas
29	DF	FRA	Dagui Paviot
31	GK	SUI	Michel Fohouo
69	MF	FRA	Jibril Bouameur
70	FW	FRA	Presley Pululu
77	MF	BIH	Omer Dzonlagic
87	FW	BEL	Ilion Ssebunya
98	DF	CMR	Loïc Ombala

=== Out on loan ===
Note: Flags indicate national team as defined under FIFA eligibility rules; some limited exceptions apply. Players may hold more than one non-FIFA nationality.

No.	Pos.	Nation	Player
