= Mateo Matic =

Swiss footballer (born 1996)

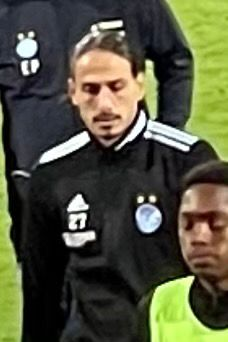

Personal information
- Date of birth: 7 January 1996 (age 30)
- Place of birth: Ilanz/Glion, Switzerland
- Height: 1.85 m (6 ft 1 in)
- Position: Goalkeeper

Youth career
- 2005–2013: Grasshopper

Senior career*
Years	Team	Apps	(Gls)
2013–2017	Grasshopper U21	54	(0)
2017–2022	Grasshopper	38	(0)
2017–2018	→ Schaffhausen (loan)	27	(0)
2022–2024	Thun	56	(0)

International career^{‡}
2011	Switzerland U15	1	(0)
2013	Switzerland U18	1	(0)
2016–2017	Switzerland U20	2	(0)
2016–2017	Switzerland U21	2	(0)
- * Club domestic league appearances and goals as of 22 May 2024 ‡ National team caps and goals as of 05:39, 25 May 2022 (UTC)

Mateo Matic (Croatian: Matić; born 7 January 1996) is a Swiss professional footballer who plays as a goalkeeper.

== Professional career ==
Matic is a youth product of Grasshopper, and began his career with their reserves in 2013. He joined Schaffhausen on loan between 2017 and 2018. He made his professional debut for Grasshopper in a 3-0 Swiss Super League loss to FC Sion on 22 May 2019.

In the 2020–21 Swiss Challenge League, he was instrumental in helping Grasshopper achieve promotion back to the Swiss Super League. In the following season, however, he was relegated to backup and cup goalkeeper. As a result, he chose not to renew his contract at the end of the season. He captained the squad in his last and only league game of the season, a 0–3 defeat to BSC Young Boys.

On 29 August 2022, he signed with Swiss Challenge League side FC Thun for the remainder of the first half of the season.

== International career ==
Born in Switzerland, Matic is of Croatian descent. He is a youth international for Switzerland.
