= Léo Bonatini =

Brazilian footballer (born 1994)

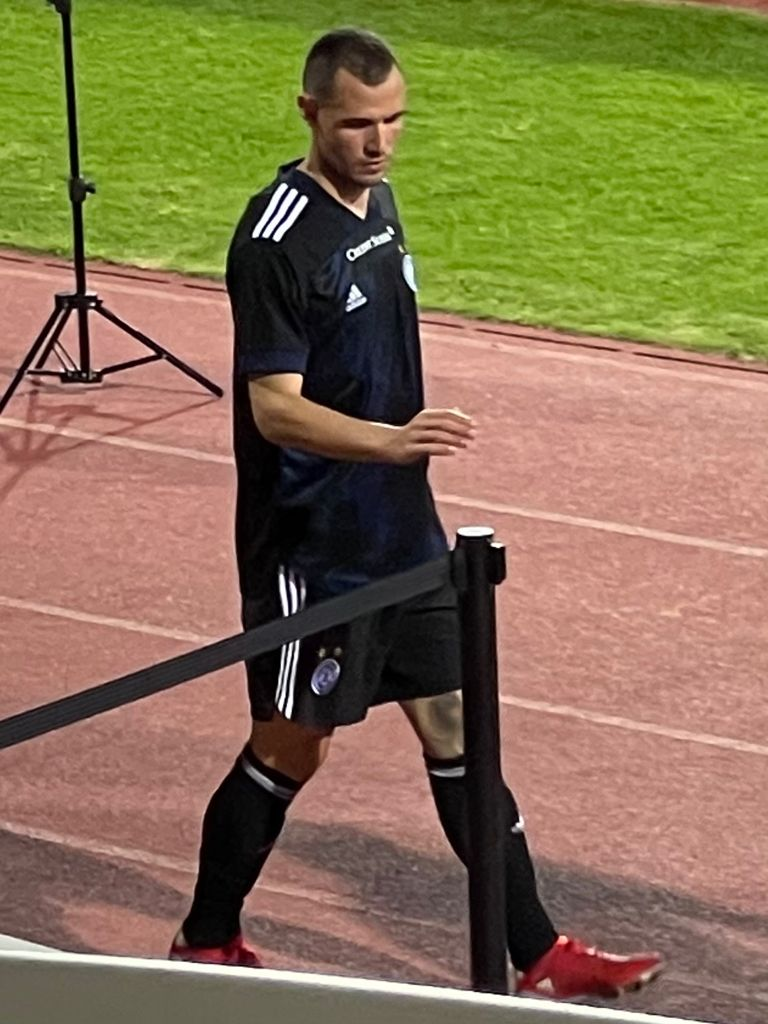
- Bonatini in 2021

Personal information
- Full name: Leonardo Bonatini Lohner Maia
- Date of birth: 28 March 1994 (age 32)
- Place of birth: Belo Horizonte, Minas Gerais, Brazil
- Height: 1.85 m (6 ft 1 in)
- Position: Forward

Youth career
- 2010–2013: Cruzeiro
- 2012–2013: → Juventus (loan)

Senior career*
Years	Team	Apps	(Gls)
2013–2015	Cruzeiro	0	(0)
2013–2014	→ Goiás (loan)	6	(2)
2015	→ Estoril (loan)	15	(4)
2015–2016	Estoril	33	(17)
2016–2018	Al-Hilal	25	(12)
2017–2018	→ Wolverhampton Wanderers (loan)	43	(12)
2018–2022	Wolverhampton Wanderers	7	(0)
2019	→ Nottingham Forest (loan)	5	(0)
2019–2020	→ Vitória Guimarães (loan)	19	(3)
2020–2022	→ Grasshoppers (loan)	57	(18)
2023–2025	Atlético San Luis	70	(20)

International career
2011	Brazil U17	12	(5)
- * Club domestic league appearances and goals as of 17:14, 27 February 2025 (UTC)

Leonardo Bonatini Lohner Maia (born 28 March 1994) is a Brazilian professional footballer who plays as a forward for Liga MX club Atlético San Luis.

== Club career ==
=== Cruzeiro ===
Born in Belo Horizonte, Minas Gerais, Bonatini joined Cruzeiro's youth setup in 2010, aged 16. In July 2012 he was loaned to Italian Serie A club Juventus for one season, with a buyout clause.

Bonatini only appeared for the club's Primavera squad, and subsequently returned to Cruzeiro in the 2013 summer. On 2 October 2013 he moved to Goiás, also in a temporary deal until the end of the year.

Bonatini made his professional – and Série A – debut on 27 October, coming on as a second-half substitute in a 2–0 away win against Náutico. He appeared in five further matches for Esmeraldino during the campaign, and had his loan contract renewed for a further year on 7 January 2014.

On 5 August 2014, Bonatini's loan was cut short, due to the lack of opportunities in the main squad.

=== Estoril ===
On 5 January 2015, he was loaned to Primeira Liga side Estoril Praia, until June.

On 13 July 2015, Bonatini had 50% of his federative rights sold to Traffic Group, remaining at Estoril permanently. On 27 February 2016, he scored a hat-trick in a 3–0 home win against Vitória de Setúbal. He finished the season with 17 goals as the Canarinhos finished 8th, with only Jonas, Islam Slimani and Kostas Mitroglou scoring more in the entire league.

=== Al-Hilal ===
On 16 July 2016, Bonatini joined Saudi club Al-Hilal. He won the Saudi Professional League in his only season in Riyadh, with him and compatriot Carlos Eduardo scoring 12 goals each. The team also won the 2017 King Cup, and Bonatini scored twice in the 3–2 win over Al-Wehda in the last 16 at the Prince Faisal bin Fahd Stadium.

=== Wolverhampton Wanderers ===
On 1 August 2017, Bonatini was sent on a season-long loan to Championship side Wolverhampton Wanderers. Four days later, he made his debut, and scored his first goal, in a 1–0 win against Middlesbrough at Molineux Stadium. He scored his 10th goal of the season on 3 November 2017 in a 2–0 win against Fulham, scoring in six consecutive games, becoming the first player of the 2017–18 EFL Championship season to reach double figures. On 10 November 2017, after scoring 5 goals in 4 games during the October fixtures, he was awarded with the EFL Championship Player of the Month. Despite scoring his last goal of the season on 4 December 2017, Bonatini finished as Wolves' second top scorer with 12 goals in 43 games as the club gained promotion to the Premier League, as well as winning the Championship league title.

On 30 June 2018, he joined Wolves on a permanent deal, signing a four-year contract for an undisclosed fee. However, he took little part in their top-flight campaign, having fallen behind other strikers such as Raúl Jiménez at Nuno Espírito Santo's club.

On 31 January 2019, Bonatini joined Championship side Nottingham Forest on loan until the end of the season. He debuted two days later in a 2–0 loss at Birmingham City, replacing Daryl Murphy after an hour. Bonatini made only four more appearances for the Reds – two starts – and did not score.

Bonatini returned to Portugal's top flight on 30 August 2019, signing a season-long loan for Vitória SC.

On 22 September 2020 he agreed a two-year-long loan deal at Swiss side Grasshopper, playing in the Swiss Challenge League. With 11 goals shot in 31 games, the highest scorer for Grasshopper, he was instrumental in helping them achieve promotion to the Swiss Super League. In his second year at Grasshopper, he played a further 26 matches and shot seven goals (second highest in the team) and helped the team remain in the top Swiss league. After a total of 20 goals scored in 59 matches, he returned to back to Wolves at the end of May 2022.

=== Atlético San Luis ===
On December 1, 2022, Wolves announced that Bonatini had left the club by mutual consent after 4 years. On January 1, 2023, he joined Atlético San Luis on a two-and-a-half-year deal on a free transfer.

== Career statistics ==
=== Club ===
As of match played on 3 December 2023

Club	Season	League			State league (Note: Includes Campeonato Goiano)		National cup (Note: Includes Copa do Brasil, Taça de Portugal, King Cup, FA Cup, Swiss Cup)		League cup (Note: Includes Taça da Liga, EFL Cup)		Continental		Other		Total	
Club	Season	Division	Apps	Goals	Apps	Goals	Apps	Goals	Apps	Goals	Apps	Goals	Apps	Goals	Apps	Goals
Cruzeiro	2013	Série A	0	0	0	0	0	0	–		–		–		0	0
Cruzeiro	2014	Série A	0	0	0	0	0	0	–		–		–		0	0
Cruzeiro	2015	Série A	0	0	0	0	0	0	–		–		–		0	0
Cruzeiro	Total		0	0	0	0	0	0	–		–		–		0	0
Goiás (loan)	2013	Série A	5	0	11	2	0	0	–		–		10	3	26	5
Goiás (loan)	2014	Série A	1	0	0	0	2	0	–		–		–		3	0
Goiás (loan)	Total		6	0	11	2	2	0	–		–		10	3	29	5
Estoril	2014–15	Primeira Liga	15	4	—		0	0	1	0	—		—		16	4
Estoril	2015–16	Primeira Liga	33	17	—		2	1	1	1	1	1	—		37	20
Estoril	Total		48	21	—		2	1	2	1	1	1	—		53	24
Al-Hilal	2016–17	Saudi Professional League	25	12	—		4	3	—		5 (Note: Appearances in AFC Champions League)	0	1 (Note: Appearance in Saudi Super Cup)	0	35	15
Wolverhampton Wanderers (loan)	2017–18	Championship	43	12	—		2	0	2	0	—		—		47	12
Wolverhampton Wanderers	2018–19	Premier League	7	0	—		0	0	2	1	—		—		9	1
Nottingham Forest (loan)	2018–19	Championship	5	0	—		0	0	0	0	—		—		5	0
Vitória Guimarães (loan)	2019–20	Primeira Liga	19	3	—		0	0	4	3	5 (Note: Appearances in UEFA Europa League)	0	—		28	6
Grasshoppers (loan)	2020–21	Swiss Challenge League	31	11	—		2	2	—		—		—		33	13
Grasshoppers (loan)	2021–22	Swiss Super League	25	7	—		0	0	—		—		—		25	7
Grasshoppers (loan)	Total		56	18	—		2	2	—		—		—		58	20
Atlético San Luis	2022–23	Liga MX	20	6	—		—		—		—		—		20	6
Atlético San Luis	2023–24	Liga MX	19	5	—		—		—		—		—		19	5
Career total			248	76	11	2	12	6	10	5	11	1	11	3	305	94

== Honours ==
Al Hilal

- Saudi Professional League: 2016–17
- King Cup: 2017

Wolverhampton Wanderers

- EFL Championship: 2017–18

Grasshoppers

- Swiss Challenge League: 2020–21

Individual

- EFL Championship Player of the Month: October 2017
- PFA Fans' Championship Player of the Month: October 2017
