= Miguel Nóbrega =

Portuguese footballer

Personal information
- Full name: Miguel Raimundo Nóbrega
- Date of birth: 17 April 2000 (age 26)
- Place of birth: Funchal, Portugal
- Height: 1.90 m (6 ft 3 in)
- Position: Centre-back

Team information
- Current team: União Leiria (on loan from Vitória Guimarães)
- Number: 5

Youth career
- 2008–2010: Marítimo
- 2010–2012: Nacional
- 2010–2019: Benfica

Senior career*
Years	Team	Apps	(Gls)
2019–2022	Benfica B	27	(2)
2020–2021	→ Grasshoppers (loan)	15	(0)
2022–2025	Rio Ave	34	(1)
2024–2025	→ Piast Gliwice (loan)	5	(0)
2025–	Vitória Guimarães	13	(1)
2026–	→ União Leiria (loan)	0	(0)

International career
2015–2016	Portugal U16	4	(0)
2018	Portugal U18	2	(0)
2019	Portugal U20	2	(0)
- * Club domestic league appearances and goals as of 13 September 2026

Miguel Raimundo Nóbrega (born 17 April 2000) is a Portuguese professional footballer who plays as a central defender for Liga Portugal 2 club União de Leiria on loan from Vitória de Guimarães.

== Club career ==
=== Benfica ===
Born in Funchal, Madeira, started his development at local club C.S. Marítimo, joining S.L. Benfica's academy aged 10. He was part of the latter's squad that won the junior national championship in 2018.

Nóbrega made his professional debut for Benfica B on 5 May 2019, playing the entire 1–1 home draw against FC Porto B in the LigaPro. For the 2020–21 season, he was loaned to Grasshopper Club Zurich in the Swiss Challenge League.

Nóbrega scored his first goal for Benfica's reserves on 16 January 2022, in a 3–0 second-division away win over C.D. Nacional.

=== Rio Ave ===
On 15 July 2022, Nóbrega signed a three-year contract with Rio Ave F.C. of the Primeira Liga. He played his first game in the competition on 6 August, in a 0–1 home loss to F.C. Vizela.

Nóbrega scored his maiden Portuguese top-flight on 12 November 2023, opening an eventual 1–1 draw at Gil Vicente FC. He spent the 2024–25 campaign on another loan abroad, at Polish Ekstraklasa side Piast Gliwice.

=== Vitória Guimarães ===
On 28 June 2025, Nóbrega joined Vitória de Guimarães on a three-year deal. On 16 August, he scored his team's first goal in a 3–2 home victory against G.D. Estoril Praia. The following 10 January, he started and finished the 2–1 defeat of S.C. Braga in the final of the Taça da Liga, their first-ever win in the competition.

Nóbrega was loaned to second-tier U.D. Leiria for 2026–27.

== Honours ==
Benfica

- Campeonato Nacional de Juniores: 2017–18

Grasshoppers

- Swiss Challenge League: 2020–21

Vitória Guimarães

- Taça da Liga: 2025–26
