= 2017–18 Wolverhampton Wanderers F.C. season =

English football club season

Wolverhampton Wanderers
2017–18 season
- Chairman: Jeff Shi
- Head coach: Nuno Espírito Santo
- Stadium: Molineux
- EFL Championship: 1st (promoted)
- FA Cup: Third round
- EFL Cup: Fourth round
- Top goalscorer: League: Diogo Jota (17); All: Diogo Jota (18)
- Highest home attendance: 30,239 (vs Aston Villa, 14 October 2017)
- Lowest home attendance: 9,478 (vs Yeovil, 8 August 2017)
- Average home league attendance: 28,298
Home colours	Away colours

The 2017–18 season was the 140th in the history of English football club Wolverhampton Wanderers and the first under former FC Porto manager Nuno Espírito Santo who was appointed on 31 May 2017. The club competed in the English Football League Championship for the fourth consecutive and final year as well as the EFL Cup and the FA Cup.

The club led the league table on 31 October with a win against Norwich City and stayed put since then, both winning the title and gaining promotion to the Premier League after a 6-year absence with a tally of 99 points, the club's highest-ever in the second tier. The club recorded a pre-tax loss of £57.16 million in its season-concluded accounts published on 5 March 2019, of which around £20 million was for bonuses paid to its staff and players for achieving Premier League promotion. It also noted a deficit of more than a £1 million per week, making the loss more than double the value from the previous financial year.

== Matches ==
=== Pre-season ===
Wolves began their pre-season training at their training ground on 26 June 2017 before playing six friendlies, included three during a stay in Austria.

12 July 2017 Friendly	Werder Bremen	0–1	Wolverhampton Wanderers	Zell am Ziller, Austria
18:00 CEST		Report	Dicko 50'	Stadium: Parkstadion; Referee: Walter Altmann

15 July 2017 Friendly	Viktoria Plzeň	1–2	Wolverhampton Wanderers	Westerndorf, Austria
17:00 CEST	Bakoš 64'	Report	Dicko 16'; Doherty 31'	Stadium: Waldstadion; Attendance: 300

18 July 2017 Friendly	Jablonec	1–0	Wolverhampton Wanderers	Schwaz, Austria
18:00 CEST	Trávník 51'	Report		Stadium: Silberstadt Arena

22 July 2017 Friendly	Shrewsbury Town	2–0	Wolverhampton Wanderers	Shrewsbury
15:00 BST	Rodman 7'; Morris 30'	Report		Stadium: Montgomery Waters Meadow; Attendance: 5,409 (2,883 away); Referee: Rob Lewis

25 July 2017 Friendly	Peterborough United	0–1	Wolverhampton Wanderers	Peterborough
19:30 BST		Report	Samuels 70'	Stadium: ABAX Stadium; Referee: Neil Hair

29 July 2017 Friendly	Wolverhampton Wanderers	1–0	Leicester City	Wolverhampton
15:00 BST	Cavaleiro 60'	Report		Stadium: Molineux; Attendance: 11,953 (1,634 away); Referee: Steve Martin

=== Football League Championship ===
A total of 24 teams competed in the EFL Championship in the 2017–18 season. Each team played every other team twice, once at their stadium, and once at the opposition's. Three points were awarded to teams for each win, one point per draw, and none for defeats. The provisional fixture list was released on 21 June 2017, but was subject to change in the event of matches being selected for television coverage or police concerns.

==== Results ====
5 August 2017 1	Wolverhampton Wanderers	1–0	Middlesbrough	Wolverhampton
15:00 BST	Bonatini 33'	Report		Stadium: Molineux; Attendance: 29,692 (2,564 away fans); Referee: Darren Bond

12 August 2017 2	Derby County	0–2	Wolverhampton Wanderers	Derby
15:00 BST		Report	Douglas 32'; Cavaleiro 76'	Stadium: Pride Park; Attendance: 27,757 (3,124 away fans); Referee: Lee Probert

15 August 2017 3	Hull City	2–3	Wolverhampton Wanderers	Kingston upon Hull
19:45 BST)	Dawson 27'; Meyler 90+10' (pen.)	Report	Neves 6'; Jota 43'; Dicko 90'	Stadium: KCOM Stadium; Attendance: 17,145 (1,527 away fans); Referee: Jeremy Simpson

19 August 2017 4	Wolverhampton Wanderers	1–2	Cardiff City	Wolverhampton
15:00 BST	Bonatini 67'	Report	Ralls 54'; Mendez-Laing 77'	Stadium: Molineux; Attendance: 27,068 (1,576 away fans); Referee: Scott Duncan

26 August 2017 5	Brentford	0–0	Wolverhampton Wanderers	Brentford
15:00 BST		Report		Stadium: Griffin Park; Attendance: 10,351 (1,650 away fans); Referee: Tim Robinson

9 September 2017 6	Wolverhampton Wanderers	1–0	Millwall	Wolverhampton
15:00 BST	Jota 10'	Report		Stadium: Molineux; Attendance: 24,426 (1,235 away fans); Referee: Bobby Madley

12 September 2017 7	Wolverhampton Wanderers	3–3	Bristol City	Wolverhampton
19:45 BST	Bonatini 28'; Jota 54'; Batth 85'	Report	Flint 43'; Diédhiou 58' (pen.); Reid 82'	Stadium: Molineux; Attendance: 23,045 (687 away fans); Referee: Steve Martin

16 September 2017 8	Nottingham Forest	1–2	Wolverhampton Wanderers	Nottingham
15:00 BST	Carayol 75'	Report	Jota 47', 81'	Stadium: City Ground; Attendance: 25,756 (1,998 away fans); Referee: Geoff Eltringham

23 September 2017 9	Wolverhampton Wanderers	2–1	Barnsley	Wolverhampton
15:00 BST	Enobakhare 80'; N'Diaye 90+3'	Report	Jackson 90+1'	Stadium: Molineux; Attendance: 28,154 (926 away fans); Referee: Jeremy Simpson

27 September 2017 10	Sheffield United	2–0	Wolverhampton Wanderers	Sheffield
19:45 BST	Clarke 39', 58'	Report	Neves (penalty missed) 51'	Stadium: Bramall Lane; Attendance: 25,893 (2,233 away fans); Referee: Peter Bankes

30 September 2017 11	Burton Albion	0–4	Wolverhampton Wanderers	Burton upon Trent
15:00 BST		Report	Jota 5'; Saïss 11'; Vinagre 41'; Bonatini 62'	Stadium: Pirelli Stadium; Attendance: 5,080 (1,641 away fans); Referee: Tony Harrington

14 October 2017 12	Wolverhampton Wanderers	2–0	Aston Villa	Wolverhampton
17:30 BST	Jota 55'; Bonatini 71'	Report		Stadium: Molineux; Attendance: 30,239 (2,758 away fans); Referee: Tim Robinson
Note: Live on Sky Sports

21 October 2017 13	Wolverhampton Wanderers	3–2	Preston North End	Wolverhampton
15:00 BST	Cavaleiro 44'; Bonatini 59' (pen.), 63'	Report	Hugill 65'; Coady 76' (o.g.)	Stadium: Molineux; Attendance: 27,352 (1,983 away fans); Referee: Steve Martin

28 October 2017 14	Queens Park Rangers	2–1	Wolverhampton Wanderers	Shepherd's Bush, London
15:00 BST	Washington 41'; Smith 81'	Report	Bonatini 43'	Stadium: Loftus Road; Attendance: 16,004 (3,194 away fans); Referee: Tony Harrington

31 October 2017 15	Norwich City	0–2	Wolverhampton Wanderers	Norwich
19:45 GMT		Report	Boly 18'; Bonatini 72'	Stadium: Carrow Road; Attendance: 26,554 (1,415 away fans); Referee: Darren England

3 November 2017 16	Wolverhampton Wanderers	2–0	Fulham	Wolverhampton
19:45 GMT	Saïss 9'; Bonatini 26'	Report		Stadium: Molineux; Attendance: 24,388 (490 away fans); Referee: David Coote
Note: Live on Sky Sports

18 November 2017 17	Reading	0–2	Wolverhampton Wanderers	Reading
15:00 GMT		Report	Cavaleiro 16'; Doherty 88'	Stadium: Madejski Stadium; Attendance: 20,708 (3,873 away fans); Referee: Roger East

22 November 2017 18	Wolverhampton Wanderers	4–1	Leeds United	Wolverhampton
19:45 GMT	Douglas 15'; Cavaleiro 26'; Jota 72'; Costa 76' (pen.)	Report	Alioski 48'	Stadium: Molineux; Attendance: 28,914 (2,370 away fans); Referee: Geoff Eltringham

25 November 2017 19	Wolverhampton Wanderers	5–1	Bolton Wanderers	Wolverhampton
15:00 GMT	Boly 13'; Bonatini 25'; Cavaleiro 62' (pen.), 82'; Jota 87'	Report	Buckley 74'	Stadium: Molineux; Attendance: 27,894 (821 away fans); Referee: Keith Stroud

4 December 2017 20	Birmingham City	0–1	Wolverhampton Wanderers	Birmingham
19:45 GMT		Report	Bonatini 8'	Stadium: St Andrew's; Attendance: 19,641 (2,455 away fans); Referee: Simon Hooper
Note: Live on Sky Sports

9 December 2017 21	Wolverhampton Wanderers	0–0	Sunderland	Wolverhampton
15:00 GMT		Report		Stadium: Molineux; Attendance: 28,488 (1,447 away fans); Referee: Jeremy Simpson

15 December 2017 22	Sheffield Wednesday	0–1	Wolverhampton Wanderers	Sheffield
19:45 GMT		Report	Neves 34'	Stadium: Hillsborough; Attendance: 23,809 (1,267 away fans); Referee: Darren Bond
Note: Live on Sky Sports

23 December 2017 23	Wolverhampton Wanderers	1–0	Ipswich Town	Wolverhampton
15:00 GMT	Cavaleiro 40'	Report		Stadium: Molineux; Attendance: 30,218 (754 away fans); Referee: David Coote

26 December 2017 24	Millwall	2–2	Wolverhampton Wanderers	Bermondsey
13:00 GMT	Gregory 13'; Cooper 72'	Report	Jota 45+4'; Saïss 56'	Stadium: The Den; Attendance: 13,121 (1,726 away fans); Referee: Tim Robinson

30 December 2017 25	Bristol City	1–2	Wolverhampton Wanderers	Bristol
17:30 GMT	Reid 53'	Report	Douglas 66'; Bennett 90+4'	Stadium: Ashton Gate; Attendance: 25,540 (3,442 away fans); Referee: Peter Bankes
Note: Live on Sky Sports

2 January 2018 26	Wolverhampton Wanderers	3–0	Brentford	Wolverhampton
19:45 GMT	Neves 57'; Douglas 59'; Jota 80'	Report		Stadium: Molineux; Attendance: 28,475 (458 away fans); Referee: Andrew Madley

13 January 2018 27	Barnsley	0–0	Wolverhampton Wanderers	Barnsley
15:00 GMT		Report		Stadium: Oakwell; Attendance: 16,050 (4,722 away fans); Referee: Keith Stroud

20 January 2018 28	Wolverhampton Wanderers	0–2	Nottingham Forest	Wolverhampton
15:00 GMT		Report	Dowell 40'; Osborn 43'	Stadium: Molineux; Attendance: 29,050 (1,639 away fans); Referee: Bobby Madley

27 January 2018 29	Ipswich Town	0–1	Wolverhampton Wanderers	Ipswich
15:00 GMT		Report	Doherty 15'	Stadium: Portman Road; Attendance: 15,971 (1,890 away fans); Referee: Simon Hooper

3 February 2018 30	Wolverhampton Wanderers	3–0	Sheffield United	Wolverhampton
17:30 GMT	Neves 5'; Jota 30'; Cavaleiro 76'	Report		Stadium: Molineux; Attendance: 29,311 (2,021 away fans); Referee: Darren Bond
Note: Live on Sky Sports

10 February 2018 31	Wolverhampton Wanderers	2–1	Queens Park Rangers	Wolverhampton
15:00 GMT	N'Diaye 12'; Costa 21'	Report	Washington 51'	Stadium: Molineux; Attendance: 30,168 (765 away fans); Referee: Geoff Eltringham

17 February 2018 32	Preston North End	1–1	Wolverhampton Wanderers	Preston
15:00 GMT	Browne 52'	Report	Costa 61'	Stadium: Deepdale; Attendance: 18,570 (5,626 away fans); Referee: Robert Jones

21 February 2018 33	Wolverhampton Wanderers	2–2	Norwich City	Wolverhampton
19:45 GMT	Lewis 12' (o.g.); N'Diaye 25'	Report	Zimmermann 27'; Oliveira 90+3'	Stadium: Molineux; Attendance: 29,100 (624 away fans); Referee: James Linington

24 February 2018 34	Fulham	2–0	Wolverhampton Wanderers	London
17:30 GMT	Sessegnon 38'; Mitrovic 71'	Report		Stadium: Craven Cottage; Attendance: 23,510 (4,673 away fans); Referee: Peter Bankes
Note: Live on Sky Sports

7 March 2018 35	Leeds United	0–3	Wolverhampton Wanderers	Leeds
19:45 GMT		Report	Saïss 28'; Boly 45'; Afobe 74'	Stadium: Elland Road; Attendance: 26,434 (1,356 away fans); Referee: Tim Robinson
Note: Live on Sky Sports

10 March 2018 36	Aston Villa	4–1	Wolverhampton Wanderers	Birmingham
17:30 GMT	Adomah 8'; Chester 57'; Grabban 62'; Bjarnason 85'	Report	Jota 20'	Stadium: Villa Park; Attendance: 37,836 (2,700 away fans); Referee: David Coote
Note: Live on Sky Sports

13 March 2018 37	Wolverhampton Wanderers	3–0	Reading	Wolverhampton
19:45 GMT	Doherty 40', 73'; Afobe 58'	Report		Stadium: Molineux; Attendance: 27,341 (249 away fans); Referee: Robert Jones

17 March 2018 38	Wolverhampton Wanderers	3–1	Burton Albion	Wolverhampton
15:00 GMT	Costa 15'; Afobe 41', 56'	Report	Dyer 44'	Stadium: Molineux; Attendance: 29,977 (533 away fans); Referee: Geoff Eltringham

30 March 2018 39	Middlesbrough	1–2	Wolverhampton Wanderers	Middlesbrough
17:30 BST	Bamford 90+4'	Report	Costa 32'; Cavaleiro 37'	Stadium: Riverside Stadium; Attendance: 27,658 (1,782 away fans); Referee: Stuart Attwell
Note: Live on Sky Sports

3 April 2018 40	Wolverhampton Wanderers	2–2	Hull City	Wolverhampton
19:45 BST	Jota 18' (pen.); Buur 83'	Report	Meyler 37' (pen.); Bennett 78' (o.g.)	Stadium: Molineux; Attendance: 29,718 (371 away fans); Referee: Darren England

6 April 2018 41	Cardiff City	0–1	Wolverhampton Wanderers	Cardiff
19:45 BST	Madine (penalty missed) 90+4'; Hoilett (penalty missed) 90+6'	Report	Neves 67'	Stadium: Cardiff City Stadium; Attendance: 29,317 (3,000 away fans); Referee: Mike Dean
Note: Live on Sky Sports

11 April 2018 42	Wolverhampton Wanderers	2–0	Derby County	Wolverhampton
19:45 BST	Jota 6'; Neves 51'	Report		Stadium: Molineux; Attendance: 28,503 (1,115 away fans); Referee: Tim Robinson
Note: Live on Sky Sports

15 April 2018 43	Wolverhampton Wanderers	2–0	Birmingham City	Wolverhampton
12:00 BST	Jota 21'; Afobe 87'	Report		Stadium: Molineux; Attendance: 29,536 (1,987 away fans); Referee: Andy Davies
Note: Live on Sky Sports

21 April 2018 44	Bolton Wanderers	0–4	Wolverhampton Wanderers	Horwich
15:00 BST		Report	Douglas 16'; Afobe 45+1'; Jota 53'; Coady 66' (pen.)	Stadium: Macron Stadium; Attendance: 19,092 (4,796 away fans); Referee: Keith Stroud

28 April 2018 45	Wolverhampton Wanderers	0–0	Sheffield Wednesday	Wolverhampton
15:00 BST		Report		Stadium: Molineux; Attendance: 29,794 (2,193 away fans); Referee: Simon Hooper

6 May 2018 46	Sunderland	3–0	Wolverhampton Wanderers	Sunderland
12:30 BST	Ejaria 19'; Fletcher 45'; McNair 66'	Report		Stadium: Stadium of Light; Attendance: 28,452 (2,589 away fans); Referee: Jeremy Simpson

==== League table ====
Pos	Team	Pld	W	D	L	GF	GA	GD	Pts	Promotion, qualification or relegation
1	Wolverhampton Wanderers (C, P)	46	30	9	7	82	39	+43	99	Promotion to the Premier League
2	Cardiff City (P)	46	27	9	10	69	39	+30	90	Promotion to the Premier League
3	Fulham (O, P)	46	25	13	8	79	46	+33	88	Qualification for Championship play-offs (Note: Four teams play for one spot and promotion to the Premier League.)
4	Aston Villa	46	24	11	11	72	42	+30	83	Qualification for Championship play-offs
5	Middlesbrough	46	22	10	14	67	45	+22	76	Qualification for Championship play-offs

Source: English Football League
Rules for classification: 1) Points; 2) Goal difference; 3) Number of goals scored
(C) Champions; (O) Play-off winners; (P) Promoted

==== Results summary ====
Overall								Home						Away					
Pld	W	D	L	GF	GA	GD	Pts	W	D	L	GF	GA	GD	W	D	L	GF	GA	GD
46	30	9	7	82	39	+43	99	16	5	2	47	18	+29	14	4	5	35	21	+14

Source: Statto.com

==== Results by round ====
Round	1	2	3	4	5	6	7	8	9	10	11	12	13	14	15	16	17	18	19	20	21	22	23	24	25	26	27	28	29	30	31	32	33	34	35	36	37	38	39	40	41	42	43	44	45	46
Ground	H	A	A	H	A	H	H	A	H	A	A	H	H	A	A	H	A	H	H	A	H	A	H	A	A	H	A	H	A	H	H	A	H	A	A	A	H	H	A	H	A	H	H	A	H	A
Result	W	W	W	L	D	W	D	W	W	L	W	W	W	L	W	W	W	W	W	W	D	W	W	D	W	W	D	L	W	W	W	D	D	L	W	L	W	W	W	D	W	W	W	W	D	L
Position	9	2	2	3	4	3	4	2	2	4	2	1	1	2	1	1	1	1	1	1	1	1	1	1	1	1	1	1	1	1	1	1	1	1	1	1	1	1	1	1	1	1	1	1	1	1

Source: 11v11.com
A = Away; H = Home; W = Win; D = Draw; L = Loss

=== FA Cup ===
In the FA Cup, Wolverhampton Wanderers entered the competition in the third round and were drawn at home to Swansea City.

6 January 2018 R3	Wolverhampton Wanderers	0–0	Swansea City	Wolverhampton
15:00 GMT		Report		Stadium: Molineux; Attendance: 22,976 (1,234 away fans); Referee: Anthony Taylor

17 January 2018 R3 rep.	Swansea City	2–1	Wolverhampton Wanderers	Swansea
19:45 GMT	Ayew 11'; Bony 69'	Report	Jota 66'	Stadium: Liberty Stadium; Attendance: 8,294 (1,883 away fans); Referee: Chris Kavanagh

=== EFL Cup ===
8 August 2017 R1	Wolverhampton Wanderers	1–0	Yeovil Town	Wolverhampton
19:45 BST	Dicko 76'	Report		Stadium: Molineux; Attendance: 9,478 (440 away fans); Referee: Rob Lewis

23 August 2017 R2	Southampton	0–2	Wolverhampton Wanderers	Southampton
19:45 BST		Report	Batth 67'; Wilson 87'	Stadium: St Mary's Stadium; Attendance: 17,931 (1,695 away fans); Referee: James Linington

19 September 2017 R3	Wolverhampton Wanderers	1–0 (a.e.t.)	Bristol Rovers	Wolverhampton
19:45 BST	Enobakhare 98'	Report		Stadium: Molineux; Attendance: 12,740 (1,957 away fans); Referee: Tony Harrington

24 October 2017 R4	Manchester City	0–0 (a.e.t.) (4–1 p)	Wolverhampton Wanderers	Manchester
20:00 BST		Report		Stadium: Etihad Stadium; Attendance: 50,755 (6,114 away fans); Referee: Kevin Friend
	Penalties
	De Bruyne (penalty scored); Touré (penalty scored); Sané (penalty scored); Agüero (penalty scored)		(penalty scored) Bonatini; (penalty missed) N'Diaye; (penalty missed) Coady

== Players ==
=== Statistics ===
Key:
‡ On loan from another club * First appearance(s) for the club

- # = Squad number
- Pos = Playing position
- P = Number of games played
- G = Number of goals scored
- GK = Goalkeeper
- DF = Defender
- MF = Midfielder
- FW = Forward
- = Yellow cards
- = Red cards
- † Permanent player left club during the season
- ¤ Loaned to another club for part or all of season

Correct as of end of the season. Starting appearances are listed first, followed by substitute appearances in parentheses where applicable.

No.	Pos	Name	P	G	P	G	P	G	P	G	A yellow card	A red card	Notes
No.	Pos	Name	League		FA Cup		League Cup		Total		Discipline		Notes
1	GK	(Nigeria) Carl Ikeme	0	0	0	0	0	0	0	0	0	0	
2	DF	(Republic of Ireland) Matt Doherty	45	4	2	0	0	0	47	4	2	1	
3	DF	(Scotland) Barry Douglas	38(1)	5	1(1)	0	0(1)	0	39(3)	5	8	0	
4	MF	(Wales) David Edwards †	0(1)	0	0	0	2	0	2(1)	0	0	0	
4	DF	(Senegal) Alfred N'Diaye ‡	13(20)	3	2	0	2	0	17(20)	3	6	0	
5	DF	(England) Ryan Bennett	27(2)	1	1	0	3	0	31(2)	1	8	0	
6	DF	(England) Danny Batth	15(1)	1	1	0	4	1	20(1)	2	4	1	
7	MF	(Portugal) Ivan Cavaleiro	31(11)	9	0(1)	0	1(2)	0	32(14)	9	4	0	
8	MF	(Portugal) Rúben Neves	42	6	0	0	0	0	42	6	11	1	
9	FW	(Mali) Nouha Dicko †	0(5)	1	0	0	2	1	2(5)	2	0	0	
9	FW	(Spain) Rafa Mir	0(2)	0	1(1)	0	0	0	1(3)	0	0	0	
10	FW	(Republic of Ireland) Joe Mason ¤	0	0	0	0	0	0	0	0	0	0	
11	MF	(England) Jordan Graham ¤	0(1)	0	0	0	2	0	2(1)	0	0	0	
12	MF	(England) Ben Marshall ¤	1(5)	0	0	0	3	0	4(5)	0	2	0	
13	GK	(England) Harry Burgoyne	0(1)	0	0	0	0	0	0(1)	0	0	0	
14	MF	(Poland) Michał Żyro ¤	0	0	0	0	1(1)	0	1(1)	0	1	0	
15	DF	(France) Willy Boly ‡	36	3	0	0	1	0	37	3	2	0	
16	MF	(England) Conor Coady	45	1	1	0	2	0	48	1	4	1	
17	MF	(Portugal) Hélder Costa	21(15)	5	2	0	1	0	24(15)	5	2	0	
18	FW	(Portugal) Diogo Jota ‡	43(1)	17	0(1)	1	0(1)	0	43(3)	18	9	0	
19	MF	(England) Jack Price †	0(5)	0	0	0	4	0	4(5)	0	2	0	
19	FW	(Democratic Republic of the Congo) Benik Afobe ‡	7(9)	6	0	0	0	0	7(9)	6	0	0	
20	MF	(Republic of Ireland) Connor Ronan ¤	0(3)	0	0	0	1(3)	0	1(6)	0	0	0	
21	GK	(England) John Ruddy	45	0	0	0	0	0	45	0	1	0	
23	DF	(Ghana) Phil Ofosu-Ayeh	0	0	0	0	0	0	0	0	0	0	
24	MF	(England) Morgan Gibbs-White	1(12)	0	2	0	0	0	3(12)	0	0	0	
25	DF	(Portugal) Roderick Miranda	16(1)	0	1	0	1	0	18(1)	0	2	0	
26	FW	(Nigeria) Bright Enobakhare	5(16)	1	2	0	2(1)	1	9(17)	2	0	0	
27	MF	(Morocco) Romain Saïss	37(5)	4	0(1)	0	0(1)	0	37(7)	4	12	0	
29	DF	(Portugal) Rúben Vinagre ‡	8(1)	1	1	0	3	0	12(1)	1	0	1	
30	DF	(England) Kortney Hause	0(1)	0	2	0	1	0	3(1)	0	0	0	
31	GK	(England) Will Norris	1	0	2	0	4	0	7	0	0	0	
32	DF	(France) Sylvain Deslandes ¤	0(1)	0	0	0	2	0	2(1)	0	0	0	
33	FW	(Brazil) Léo Bonatini ‡	29(14)	12	1(1)	0	1(1)	0	31(16)	12	0	0	
34	MF	(Portugal) Pedro Gonçalves	0	0	0	0	0	0	0	0	0	0	
35	FW	(England) Donovan Wilson ¤	0	0	0	0	0(2)	1	0(2)	1	0	0	
36	DF	(England) Connor Johnson ¤	0	0	0	0	0	0	0	0	0	0	
37	MF	(Scotland) Daniel Armstrong ¤	0	0	0	0	0	0	0	0	0	0	
38	DF	(Denmark) Oskar Buur	0(1)	1	0	0	1	0	1(1)	1	0	0	

=== Awards ===
Award	Winner
Fans' Player of the Season	Rúben Neves
Players' Player of the Season	Rúben Neves
Young Player of the Season	Morgan Gibbs-White
Academy Player of the Season	Ryan Giles
Goal of the Season	Rúben Neves (vs Derby County, 11 April 2018)

== Transfers ==
=== In ===
Date	Player	From	Fee
31 May 2017 (Note: Deal officially goes through on 1 July 2017)	(England) Ryan Bennett	Unattached (Note: Released from Norwich City prior to joining Wolves.)	Free
13 June 2017	(Portugal) Roderick Miranda	(Portugal) Rio Ave	Undisclosed
20 June 2017	(Ghana) Phil Ofosu-Ayeh	Unattached (Note: Released from Eintracht Braunschweig prior to joining Wolves.)	Free
1 July 2017	(England) Kevin Berkoe	(England) Chelsea	Free
1 July 2017	(Scotland) Barry Douglas	(Turkey) Konyaspor	£1,000,000
1 July 2017	(Dominican Republic) Carlos Heredia	(England) Milton Keynes Dons	Free
1 July 2017	(England) Ben Goodliffe	(England) Boreham Wood	Free
1 July 2017	(Republic of Ireland) Ray O'Sullivan	(Republic of Ireland) St. Kevin's Boys	Free
1 July 2017	(France) Enzo Sauvage	(England) Nike Academy	Free
1 July 2017	(Wales) Terry Taylor	(Scotland) Aberdeen	Undisclosed
1 July 2017	(Republic of Ireland) Callum Thompson	(Republic of Ireland) St. Joseph's Boys	Free
8 July 2017	(Portugal) Rúben Neves	(Portugal) Porto	£15,800,000
10 July 2017	(England) John Ruddy	Unattached	Free
11 July 2017	(England) Will Norris	(England) Cambridge United	Undisclosed
18 July 2017	(Portugal) Pedro Gonçalves	(Spain) Valencia	Free
18 July 2017	(Portugal) Boubacar Hanne	(Portugal) Paços de Ferreira	Free
24 August 2017	(Denmark) Oskar Buur	(Denmark) Brabrand IF	Free
31 August 2017	(Portugal) José Xavier	(Portugal) Chaves	Free
31 August 2017	(Switzerland) Ming-yang Yang	(Switzerland) FC Winterthur	Undisclosed
1 September 2017	(England) Diego Lattie	(England) Liverpool	Free
26 October 2017	(England) Benny Ashley-Seal	Unattached	Compensation
3 January 2018	(Spain) Rafa Mir	(Spain) Valencia	Undisclosed
26 January 2018	(Denmark) Andreas Søndergaard	(Denmark) Odense	Undisclosed
31 January 2018	(Portugal) Tomás Reimão	Unattached (Note: Released from Fiorentina prior to joining Wolves)	Free
31 January 2018	(England) Ben Stevenson	(England) Coventry City	Undisclosed
1 February 2018	(England) Joseph Joseph	(England) Southend United	Free

=== Loans in ===
Date from	Player	From	Date until
8 July 2017	(France) Willy Boly	(Portugal) Porto	End of season
20 July 2017	(Portugal) Rúben Vinagre	(France) AS Monaco	End of season
25 July 2017	(Portugal) Diogo Jota	(Spain) Atlético Madrid	End of season
1 August 2017	(Brazil) Léo Bonatini	(Saudi Arabia) Al-Hilal	End of season
31 August 2017	(Senegal) Alfred N'Diaye	(Spain) Villarreal	End of season
31 January 2018	(Democratic Republic of the Congo) Benik Afobe	(England) Bournemouth	End of season

=== Out ===
Date	Player	To	Fee
26 June 2017	(England) George Saville	(England) Millwall	Undisclosed
26 June 2017	(England) Jed Wallace	(England) Millwall	Undisclosed
30 June 2017	(England) James Henry	Released (Note: James Henry joined Oxford United following his release.)	Free
30 June 2017	(Portugal) Sílvio	Released (Note: Sílvio joined Braga following his release.)	Free
30 June 2017	(England) Mike Williamson	Released (Note: Mike Williamson joined Oxford United following his release.)	Free
1 July 2017	(England) Brandon Ball	Released (Note: Brandon Ball joined Stourbridge following his release.)	Free
1 July 2017	(England) Ben O'Hanlon	Released (Note: Ben O'Hanlon joined Harrogate Town following his release.)	Free
3 July 2017	(England) Nyeko Sinclair	Released (Note: Nyeko Sinclair joined Tamworth following his release.)	Free
14 July 2017	(Iceland) Jón Daði Böðvarsson	(England) Reading	£3,000,000
4 August 2017	(England) Regan Upton	(England) Tamworth	Free
11 August 2017	(England) Sam Phillips	(England) Haughmond	Free
26 August 2017	(Wales) David Edwards	(England) Reading	£1,000,000
27 August 2017	(England) Andy Lonergan	(England) Leeds United	Free
29 August 2017	(Mali) Nouha Dicko	(England) Hull City	£3,500,000
8 January 2018	(England) Jack Price	(United States) Colorado Rapids	Undisclosed
10 January 2018	(Wales) Lee Evans	(England) Sheffield United	Undisclosed

=== Loans out ===
Date from	Player	To	Date until
27 June 2017	(England) Jonathan Flatt	(England) Cheltenham Town	End of season (Note: Player was recalled in January 2018)
29 June 2017	(Netherlands) Paul Gladon	(Netherlands) Heracles Almelo	End of season
10 July 2017	(Romania) Nicu Carnat	(Denmark) Esbjerg	End of season
14 July 2017	(England) Ethan Ebanks-Landell	(England) Milton Keynes Dons	End of season
14 July 2017	(England) Dominic Iorfa	(England) Ipswich Town	End of season
26 July 2017	(England) Niall Ennis	(England) Shrewsbury Town	End of season
31 July 2017	(Wales) Lee Evans	(England) Wigan Athletic	End of season
1 August 2017	(England) Aaron Hayden	(England) Telford United	End of season
3 August 2017	(England) Aaron Simpson	(England) Telford United	End of season
4 August 2017	(Haiti) Duckens Nazon	(England) Coventry City	January 2018
23 August 2017	(Republic of Ireland) Joe Mason	(England) Burton Albion	January 2018
29 August 2017	(England) Will Randall	(England) Forest Green Rovers	End of season
30 August 2017	(Scotland) Jordan Allan	(Scotland) Airdrieonians	January 2018
31 August 2017	(Wales) Ryan Leak	(Wales) The New Saints	January 2018
31 August 2017	(England) Jordan Graham	(England) Fulham	End of season
31 August 2017	(Scotland) Jack Ruddy	(England) Oldham Athletic	January 2018
5 September 2017	(England) Connor Johnson	(England) Telford United	End of season
15 September 2017	(Scotland) Ross Finnie	(England) Gloucester City	15 October 2017
3 January 2018	(Wales) Aaron Collins	(England) Newport County	End of season
4 January 2018	(Republic of the Congo) Prince Oniangué	(France) Angers	End of season
5 January 2018	(Republic of Ireland) Connor Ronan	(England) Portsmouth	End of season
5 January 2018	(France) Sylvain Deslandes	(England) Portsmouth	End of season
11 January 2018	(Wales) Ryan Leak	(England) Telford United	End of season
11 January 2018	(England) Donovan Wilson	(England) Port Vale	End of season
12 January 2018	(Scotland) Jack Ruddy	(Scotland) Ayr United	End of season
22 January 2018	(Poland) Michał Żyro	(England) Charlton Athletic	End of season
26 January 2018	(Haiti) Duckens Nazon	(England) Oldham Athletic	End of season
26 January 2018	(England) Andrew Sealey-Harris	(England) Farnborough	End of season
31 January 2018	(Scotland) Daniel Armstrong	(Scotland) Dunfermline	End of season
31 January 2018	(England) Ben Marshall	(England) Millwall	End of season
31 January 2018	(England) Aaron Simpson	(Scotland) Kilmarnock	End of season
31 January 2018	(England) Ben Stevenson	(England) Colchester United	End of season
1 February 2018	(Slovakia) Christián Herc	(Slovakia) FC DAC 1904	End of season
2 February 2018	(England) Harry Beasley	(England) Stourbridge	3 March 2018
4 February 2018	(Republic of Ireland) Daniel McKenna	(Republic of Ireland) Bray Wanderers	End of season
20 February 2018	(Republic of Ireland) Joe Mason	(United States) Colorado Rapids	October 2018
