= 2018–19 Swiss Challenge League =

Swiss Challenge League
- Season: 2018–19
- Champions: Servette
- Promoted: Servette
- Relegated: Rapperswil-Jona
- Europa League: Vaduz
- Matches: 170
- Goals: 496 (2.92 per match)
- Highest scoring: Servette 5–3 Rapperswil-Jona
- All statistics correct as of 16 May 2019.

The 2018–19 Swiss Challenge League (referred to as the Brack.ch Challenge League for sponsoring reasons) was the 16th season of the Swiss Challenge League, the second tier of competitive football in Switzerland, under its current name. The season started on 20 July 2018 and ended on 26 May 2019. The winter break was scheduled between 16 December 2018 and 1 February 2019.

== Participating teams ==
A total of 10 teams participated in the league. 2017–18 Swiss Challenge League champions Neuchâtel Xamax were promoted to the 2018–19 Swiss Super League. They were replaced by FC Lausanne-Sport, who got relegated after finishing last-placed in the 2017–18 Swiss Super League. FC Wohlen was relegated after finishing 10th. They were replaced by SC Kriens, who won promotion from the 2017–18 Swiss Promotion League.

=== Stadia and locations ===
Locations of clubs in the 2018–19 Challenge League

Team	Location	Stadium	Capacity
FC Aarau	Aarau	Stadion Brügglifeld	8,000
FC Chiasso	Chiasso	Stadio Comunale Riva IV	5,000
SC Kriens	Kriens	Stadion Kleinfeld	5,360
FC Lausanne-Sport	Lausanne	Stade olympique de la Pontaise	15,850
FC Rapperswil-Jona	Rapperswil-Jona	Stadion Grünfeld	2,500
Servette FC	Geneva	Stade de Genève	30,084
FC Schaffhausen	Schaffhausen	LIPO Park Schaffhausen	8,200
FC Vaduz	(Liechtenstein) Vaduz	Rheinpark Stadion	7,584
FC Wil 1900	Wil	IGP Arena	6,958
FC Winterthur	Winterthur	Schützenwiese	8,550

=== Personnel ===
Team	Manager
Aarau	(Switzerland) Patrick Rahmen
Chiasso	(Switzerland) Alessandro Mangiarratti (1ª-13ª) (Italy) Andrea Manzo (14ª-)
Kriens	(Switzerland) Bruno Berner
Lausanne	(Switzerland) Giorgio Contini
Rapperswil-Jona	(Switzerland) Urs Meier
Schaffhausen	(Switzerland) Boris Smiljanić
Servette	(Switzerland) Alain Geiger
(Liechtenstein) Vaduz	(Liechtenstein) Mario Frick
Wil	(Germany) Konrad Fünfstück
Winterthur	(Germany) Ralf Loose

== League table ==
Pos	Team	Pld	W	D	L	GF	GA	GD	Pts	Promotion or relegation
1	Servette (C, P)	36	24	7	5	90	37	+53	79	Promotion to 2019–20 Swiss Super League
2	Aarau	36	19	7	10	63	46	+17	64	Qualification for the promotion/relegation play-offs
3	Lausanne	36	16	15	5	64	36	+28	63	
4	Winterthur	36	16	8	12	57	51	+6	56	
5	Wil	36	10	12	14	33	47	−14	42	
6	Vaduz (Note: Vaduz qualified for the 2019–20 UEFA Europa League as winners of the 2018–19 Liechtenstein Cup.)	36	11	9	16	48	70	−22	42	Qualification for the Europa League first qualifying round
7	Schaffhausen	36	10	9	17	43	62	−19	39	
8	Kriens	36	7	15	14	46	58	−12	36	
9	Chiasso	36	9	9	18	43	67	−24	36	
10	Rapperswil-Jona (R)	36	10	5	21	47	59	−12	35	Relegation to 2019–20 Swiss Promotion League

Source: Swiss Challenge League
Rules for classification: 1) Points; 2) Goal difference; 3) Goals scored; 4) Head-to-head goal difference; 5) Away goals scored; 6) Draw.
(C) Champions; (P) Promoted; (R) Relegated

== Results ==
=== First and Second Round ===
Home \ Away	AAR	CHI	KRI	LAS	RAP	SHA	SER	VAD	WIL	WIN
Aarau	—	1–2	0–2	2–2	3–0	3–1	0–2	3–1	2–0	2–3
Chiasso	2–3	—	3–3	1–1	0–1	2–1	0–3	1–3	0–2	1–3
Kriens	1–2	1–1	—	1–1	1–4	0–1	2–3	2–2	1–1	1–2
Lausanne	1–1	5–1	1–1	—	1–0	2–0	1–1	1–2	2–2	5–1
Rapperswil-Jona	2–1	0–2	1–2	2–2	—	3–0	1–1	2–1	0–1	0–4
Schaffhausen	1–3	3–2	3–2	1–1	1–0	—	1–1	4–1	2–0	2–2
Servette	3–1	5–1	1–1	0–1	4–1	3–0	—	4–1	2–0	2–0
Vaduz	2–1	4–2	2–2	1–2	3–3	1–1	1–0	—	0–2	0–1
Wil	2–0	3–1	1–1	0–2	2–1	1–2	2–1	0–0	—	2–0
Winterthur	3–1	0–1	1–1	2–1	3–2	1–1	1–3	2–1	0–0	—

Source: Swiss Super League (in German)
Legend: Blue = home team win; Yellow = draw; Red = away team win.

=== Third and Fourth Round ===
Home \ Away	AAR	CHI	KRI	LAS	RAP	SHA	SER	VAD	WIL	WIN
Aarau	—	1–0	1–1	3–0	1–0	3–2	3–3	3–0	3–1	2–2
Chiasso	0–1	—	2–2	0–5	2–1	2–2	2–1	1–2	3–1	1–1
Kriens	2–2	0–0	—	0–2	2–1	1–2	0–3	2–1	1–2	2–0
Lausanne	0–0	1–1	3–2	—	1–0	0–0	0–2	6–2	2–0	4–1
Rapperswil-Jona	1–2	0–0	1–0	0–1	—	2–0	1–2	4–1	4–0	1–4
Schaffhausen	1–2	0–2	1–2	0–2	0–2	—	0–2	1–1	2–0	1–3
Servette	1–2	3–2	4–1	3–1	5–3	6–1	—	2–0	0–0	5–2
Vaduz	2–0	1–0	3–2	2–2	3–2	0–2	1–5	—	1–1	1–0
Wil	0–4	1–2	0–1	1–1	1–1	1–1	1–1	1–1	—	1–0
Winterthur	0–1	2–0	0–0	1–1	2–0	3–2	2–3	3–0	2–0	—

Source: Swiss Super League (in German)
Legend: Blue = home team win; Yellow = draw; Red = away team win.

== Awards ==
Swiss Football League Awards 2018
Award	Winner	Club
Player of the Season	(Bosnia and Herzegovina) Miroslav Stevanović	Servette FC

Brack.ch Challenge League Dream Team 2018
Position	Player	Nationality	Club
Goalkeeper	Jérémy Frick	Switzerland	Servette FC
Defender	Per-Egil Flo	Norway	FC Lausanne-Sport
Defender	Nikki Havenaar	Japan	FC Wil
Defender	Steve Rouiller	Switzerland	Servette FC
Defender	Anthony Sauthier	Switzerland	Servette FC
Midfielder	Davide Callà	Switzerland	FC Winterthur
Midfielder	Philipp Muntwiler	Switzerland	FC Vaduz
Midfielder	Miroslav Stevanović	Bosnia and Herzegovina	Servette FC
Midfielder	Sébastien Wüthrich	Switzerland	Servette FC
Forward	Miguel Castroman	Switzerland	FC Schaffhausen
Forward	Nico Siegrist	Switzerland	SC Kriens

== Promotion play-offs ==
Ninth placed team of 2018–19 Swiss Super League, Xamax, faced Aarau, the runner-up of 2018–19 Swiss Challenge League.

=== First leg ===
30 May 2019
20:00

Xamax	0–4	Aarau
	Report	Maierhofer 22'; Taşar 34', 69'; Mišić 45+2'

Stade de la Maladière, Neuchâtel
Attendance: 12,000
Referee: Stephan Klossner

=== Second leg ===
2 June 2019
17:00

Aarau	0–4 (a.e.t.)	Xamax
	Report	Dié 20'; Ošs 29'; Ademi 38'; Tréand 72'
Penalties
Zverotić (penalty missed); Jäckle (penalty scored); Bürgy (penalty scored); Mišić (penalty scored); Karanović (penalty scored)	4–5	(penalty scored) Veloso; (penalty scored) Tréand; (penalty scored) Corbaz; (penalty scored) Ademi; (penalty scored) Dié

Stadion Brügglifeld, Aarau
Attendance: 7,526
Referee: Adrien Jaccottet

Neuchâtel Xamax won on penalties after drawing 4–4 on aggregate and will stay in the Swiss Super League.
