= André Ribeiro (footballer, born 1997) =

Portuguese footballer

Personal information
- Full name: André David Oliveira Ribeiro
- Date of birth: 9 June 1997 (age 29)
- Place of birth: Carouge, Switzerland
- Height: 1.78 m (5 ft 10 in)
- Position: Forward

Team information
- Current team: Cham
- Number: 9

Youth career
- 2006–2012: Meyrin
- 2012–2013: Étoile Carouge
- 2013–2017: FC Zürich

Senior career*
Years	Team	Apps	(Gls)
2014–2017	FC Zürich U21	54	(11)
2017–2019	Braga B	52	(7)
2019–2021	St. Gallen	2	(0)
2019–2021	St. Gallen U21	4	(0)
2021	Grasshoppers	11	(1)
2022–2023	Bellinzona	4	(0)
2023–2026	Rapperswil-Jona	59	(25)
2026–	Cham	4	(0)

International career^{‡}
2014–2015	Portugal U18	7	(2)
2015	Portugal U19	4	(1)
2016–2017	Portugal U20	11	(2)
- * Club domestic league appearances and goals as of 26 September 2026 ‡ National team caps and goals as of 4 June 2017

André David Oliveira Ribeiro (born 9 June 1997) is a Portuguese professional footballer who plays as a forward for Swiss Promotion League club Cham. He was born and raised in Switzerland and also holds the Swiss citizenship.

== Club career ==
On 6 August 2017, Ribeiro made his professional debut with Braga B in a 2017–18 LigaPro match against União Madeira.

== International career ==
He represented Portugal at the 2017 FIFA U-20 World Cup, where they reached quarterfinals.
