= Nikola Sukacev =

Swiss footballer (born 1998)

Personal information
- Date of birth: 24 February 1998 (age 28)
- Place of birth: Zürich, Switzerland
- Height: 1.78 m (5 ft 10 in)
- Positions: Winger; midfielder

Team information
- Current team: Kriens
- Number: 21

Youth career
- 2006–2017: Grasshoppers

Senior career*
Years	Team	Apps	(Gls)
2017–2020	Grasshoppers	17	(1)
2019	→ Kriens (loan)	10	(0)
2020–2021	Metalac GM	0	(0)
2021–	Kriens	2	(0)

International career
2012	Switzerland U15	2	(0)
2014–2015	Switzerland U17	5	(0)
2018	Switzerland U20	1	(0)
- * Club domestic league appearances and goals as of 25 September 2021

Nikola Sukacev (Serbian: Никола Сукачев/Nikola Sukačev; born 24 February 1998) is a Swiss professional footballer who plays as a midfielder for Kriens.

== Professional career ==
Sukacev is a sole youth product of Grasshoppers, having joined their academy in 2007. Sukacev made his debut for Grasshoppers in a Swiss Super League 1–1 tie with BSC Young Boys on 10 December 2017, wherein he scored his side's only goal. Sukacev signed his first professional contract with Grasshoppers on 29 January 2018.

On 26 July 2021, he returned to Kriens.

== International career ==
Sukacev was born in Switzerland and is of Serbian descent. He is a youth international for Switzerland, but remains eligible for Serbia.
