= João Carlos Pereira =

Portuguese football manager and former player

Personal information
- Full name: João Carlos Serra Ferreira Pereira
- Date of birth: 11 April 1965 (age 61)
- Place of birth: Luanda, Angola
- Position: Winger

Youth career
- 1978–1984: Marinhense

Senior career*
Years	Team	Apps	(Gls)
1984–1985	Marinhense	21	(2)
1985–1987	Académica	11	(0)
1987–1989	Moreirense	35	(4)
1989–1990	Trofense	24	(2)
1990–1991	Marinhense		
1991–1992	Moreirense	19	(1)
1992–1993	Mirense	19	(4)
1993–1994	Leiria Marrazes		
1994–1997	Marinhense		

Managerial career
- 1997–2001: Marinhense
- 2001–2003: Sporting Pombal
- 2003–2005: Académica
- 2005: Nacional
- 2005–2006: Moreirense
- 2007–2008: Al-Tadamon
- 2008–2009: Estoril
- 2009: Belenenses
- 2010–2011: Ermis
- 2011–2012: Servette
- 2019–2020: Académica
- 2020–2021: Grasshoppers
- 2021: Académica
- * Club domestic league appearances and goals

João Carlos Serra Ferreira Pereira (born 11 April 1965) is a Portuguese football manager and former player. As a player he was a winger.

== Playing career ==
Born in Luanda, Portuguese Angola to Portuguese parents, Pereira started playing football with A.C. Marinhense, and went on to spend one season in the Segunda Liga with the club. From 1985 to 1987 he represented Académica de Coimbra in the Primeira Liga, but was never more than a reserve player.

Pereira retired professionally in June 1990 at the age of only 25, after spells in the second division with Moreirense F.C. and C.D. Trofense.

== Coaching career ==
Pereira began coaching aged just 32, starting with Marinhense in division three and moving in 2001 to fellow league side S.C. Pombal. His top-flight debut came in the 2003–04 campaign with another former club, Académica, which he led to the 13th place.

In early 2005, after being fired by the Students, Pereira signed with C.D. Nacional and moved shortly after to Moreirense, then spent the next year without a team until he joined Kuwait's Al-Tadamon SC. After leading G.D. Estoril Praia to the fourth place in 2008–09's second tier, he returned to the top division by signing a two-year contract with C.F. Os Belenenses, which had previously been relegated only to avoid it later due to C.F. Estrela da Amadora's serious financial problems.

On 21 December 2009, following a series of poor results (culminating in the 1–0 away loss against U.D. Leiria), Pereira resigned at Belenenses although they were still above the relegation zone– eventually not managing to retain their status. On 9 December of the following year he moved to Cyprus, being appointed at Ermis Aradippou FC and asking to be released at the end of the season after managing to avoid First Division relegation by registering a club-record 30 points in the competition, 38 after the second stage.

Pereira replaced countryman João Alves at the helm of Swiss club Servette FC on 28 November 2011, being replaced in April 2012 by his predecessor. During his tenure they won four Super League matches, drew two and lost seven.

After six years working with Aspire Academy, Pereira returned for another spell as Académica coach on 18 November 2019, with the team now in the second division. He went back to Switzerland the following August, being appointed at Grasshopper Club Zürich in the Challenge League. He was dismissed on 12 May 2021 following three consecutive defeats although the club topped the league table, being eventually promoted.

Pereira re-joined Académica for the third time on 22 September 2021, with the side bottom of the second tier. He was relieved of his duties in November, having collected five losses in as many games.
