= Mike Gomes =

Swiss footballer (born 1988)

Personal information
- Date of birth: 19 September 1988 (age 38)
- Place of birth: Neuchâtel, Switzerland
- Height: 1.83 m (6 ft 0 in)
- Position: Right back

Team information
- Current team: Neuchâtel Xamax II
- Number: 23

Youth career
- 2002–2007: Neuchâtel Xamax

Senior career*
Years	Team	Apps	(Gls)
2007–2012	Neuchâtel Xamax	34	(0)
2010–2011	→ Yverdon Sport (loan)	22	(0)
2011–2012	Neuchâtel Xamax II	14	(3)
2012–2013	Servette	4	(0)
2013–2022	Neuchâtel Xamax	271	(8)
2022–	Neuchâtel Xamax II	8	(0)
- * Club domestic league appearances and goals as of 8 October 2022

Mike Gomes (born 19 September 1988) is a Swiss football defender who plays for Neuchâtel Xamax II.

== Personal life ==
Gomes was born in Switzerland and is of Portuguese descent.
