= Nuno Pina =

Portuguese association football player

Personal information
- Full name: Nuno Henrique Pina Nunes
- Date of birth: 31 March 1999 (age 27)
- Place of birth: Lisbon, Portugal
- Height: 1.82 m (6 ft 0 in)
- Position: Midfielder

Team information
- Current team: Vevey-Sports
- Number: 44

Youth career
- 2008–2009: Al. Op. Outurela
- 2009–2010: Linda-a-Velha
- 2010–2013: Casa Pia
- 2013–2015: Martigny-Sports
- 2015–2018: Sion
- 2018–2019: Genoa
- 2019: Chievo

Senior career*
Years	Team	Apps	(Gls)
2019–2021	Chievo	4	(0)
2020	→ Belenenses SAD (loan)	11	(0)
2020–2021	→ Grasshoppers (loan)	25	(3)
2021–2022	Fuenlabrada	8	(0)
2022–2023	Torreense	0	(0)
2024	Paradiso	0	(0)
2025	Ordino	8	(0)
2025–	Vevey-Sports	9	(0)

International career
2018	Portugal U19	3	(0)
2018–2019	Portugal U20	9	(0)
Medal record
Men's football
Representing Portugal
UEFA European Under-19 Championship
Winner	2018 Finland
- * Club domestic league appearances and goals as of 10 June 2026

Nuno Henrique Pina Nunes (born 31 March 1999) is a Portuguese professional footballer who plays for Swiss Promotion League club Vevey-Sports.

== Club career ==
Pina joined the under-19 squad of the Italian club Chievo in the early 2019. He made his professional Serie B debut for Chievo on 21 September 2019 in a game against Pisa, replacing Joel Obi in the 89th minute. He made his first starting lineup appearance on 25 September 2019 against Salernitana and was sent off for two cautions in the 77th minute.

On 31 January 2020, Pina was loaned to Belenenses SAD until 30 June 2021. On 27 August 2020 he moved to Switzerland on loan to Grasshoppers.

On 16 August 2021, Pina switched teams and countries again, after signing a three-year contract with Spanish Segunda División team CF Fuenlabrada. The following 28 January, after being rarely used, he terminated his link.

== International career ==
Born in Portugal, Pina is of Cape Verdean descent. He played in 2 games (including the full game in the finals against Italy) at the 2018 UEFA European Under-19 Championship, which Portugal won.

He was included in Portugal's squad for the 2019 FIFA U-20 World Cup and made one appearance as a substitute as Portugal was eliminated in group stage.
