= Breston Malula =

Swiss footballer (born 2000)

Personal information
- Full name: Breston Malula Sumbula
- Date of birth: 31 October 2000 (age 26)
- Place of birth: Bern, Switzerland
- Height: 1.94 m (6 ft 4 in)
- Positions: Centre-back; defensive midfielder

Team information
- Current team: Petrolul Ploiești
- Number: 71

Youth career
- Bümpliz 78
- Team Bern-West
- –2019: Young Boys

Senior career*
Years	Team	Apps	(Gls)
2018–2020	Young Boys U21	33	(4)
2020–2021	Chiasso	15	(0)
2021–2024	Yverdon-Sport	58	(4)
2024–2026	Lausanne Ouchy	58	(4)
2026–	Petrolul Ploiești	13	(3)
- * Club domestic league appearances and goals as of 6 November 2026

Breston Malula Sumbula (born 31 October 2000) is a Swiss professional footballer who plays as a centre-back or a defensive midfielder for Liga I club Petrolul Ploiești.

== Honours ==
Yverdon-Sport

- Swiss Challenge League: 2022–23
