= Andy Laugeois =

Footballer (born 1989)

Personal information
- Full name: Andy Jérémy Laugeois
- Date of birth: 1 March 1989 (age 37)
- Height: 1.76 m (5 ft 9 in)
- Position: Midfielder

Team information
- Current team: FC Amical Saint-Prex

Senior career*
Years	Team	Apps	(Gls)
2007–2011	Yverdon-Sport	81	(0)
2012	FC Amical Saint-Prex		
2013–2015	FC Echallens	77	(39)
2015–2022	SLO	108	(3)
2022	FC Solothurn		
2023–	FC Amical Saint-Prex		
- * Club domestic league appearances and goals

Andy Jérémy Laugeois (born. March 1989) is a footballer who plays as a midfielder for FC Amical Saint-Prex.

== Education ==
Laugeois attended the University of Lausanne.

== Career ==
Laugeois started his career with Swiss side Yverdon-Sport, where he suffered an ankle injury. In 2015, he signed for Swiss side SLO, where he captained the club. He was regarded as one of their most important players.
