= 2020–21 Swiss Challenge League =

Swiss Challenge League
- Season: 2020–21
- Champions: Grasshoppers
- Relegated: Chiasso
- Matches: 180
- Goals: 503 (2.79 per match)
- Top goalscorer: Rodrigo Pollero (19 goals)
- Biggest home win: Wil 7–0 Aarau
- Biggest away win: Xamax 0–3 Schaffhausen; Xamax 0–3 Thun; Grasshoppers 1–4 Xamax
- Highest scoring: Wil 7–0 Aarau; Kriens 5–2 Grasshoppers; Schaffhausen 5–2 Chiasso; Winterthur 5–2 Aarau
- Highest attendance: 2'870 Xamax 1–0 Grasshoppers
- All statistics correct as of 20 May 2021.

The 2020–21 Swiss Challenge League (referred to as the Brack.ch Challenge League for sponsoring reasons) is the 18th season of the Swiss Challenge League, the second tier of competitive football in Switzerland, under its current name. The season started on 18 September 2020 and is scheduled to end on 30 May 2021. The start of the season was delayed due to the COVID-19 pandemic in Switzerland. The league held its winter break between 22 December 2020 and 23 January 2021.

== Participating teams ==
A total of ten teams participate in the league. 2019–20 Swiss Challenge League champions FC Lausanne-Sport and runner-up FC Vaduz were promoted to the 2020–21 Swiss Super League. They were replaced by Neuchâtel Xamax FCS, who got relegated after finishing last-placed in the 2019–20 Swiss Super League, and FC Thun, who lost the relegation game. No team was relegated due to the cancellation of the 2019–20 Swiss Promotion League caused by the COVID-19 pandemic in Switzerland.

=== Stadia and locations ===
Locations of clubs in the 2020–21 Challenge League

Team	Location	Stadium	Capacity
FC Aarau	Aarau	Stadion Brügglifeld	8,000
FC Chiasso	Chiasso	Stadio Comunale Riva IV	5,000
Grasshopper Club Zürich	Zürich	Letzigrund	26,104
SC Kriens	Kriens	Stadion Kleinfeld	5,360
FC Stade Lausanne-Ouchy	Lausanne	Stade Olympique de la Pontaise (Note: Stade-Lausanne-Ouchy's home stadium Stade Juan-Antonio-Samaranch in Lausanne can not accommodate SLO for the Challenge League. SLO will play at the Stade Olympique de la Pontaise in Lausanne.)	15,850
Neuchâtel Xamax FCS	Neuchâtel	Stade de la Maladière	11,997
FC Schaffhausen	Schaffhausen	LIPO Park Schaffhausen	8,200
FC Thun	Thun	Stockhorn Arena	10,014
FC Wil 1900	Wil	IGP Arena	6,958
FC Winterthur	Winterthur	Schützenwiese	8,550

=== Personnel and kits ===
Team	Manager	Captain	Kit manufacturer	Shirt sponsor
Aarau	(Switzerland) Stephan Keller	(Montenegro) Elsad Zverotić	gpard	Swiss Red Cross, Credit Suisse
Chiasso	(Italy) Baldassare Raineri	(Morocco) Younes Bnou Marzouk	Macron	Caffè Chicco d'Oro, Autoronchetti
Grasshoppers	(Romania) Zoltán Kádár (caretaker)	(Serbia) Aleksandar Cvetković	Puma	none (No to Racism)
Kriens	(Switzerland) Bruno Berner	(Switzerland) Elia Alessandrini	Joma	MVM AG
Lausanne-Ouchy	(Bosnia and Herzegovina) Meho Kodro	(France) Andy Laugeois	14Fourteen	none
Neuchâtel	(Switzerland) Martin Rueda	(Switzerland) Laurent Walthert	Erima	Groupe E, Briq
Schaffhausen	(Switzerland) Murat Yakin	(Switzerland) Imran Bunjaku	Puma	Pistoleros, doc-oliday
Thun	(Argentina) Carlos Bernegger	(Switzerland) Nicola Sutter	Macron	Schneider Software AG
Wil	(Switzerland) Alexander Frei	(Switzerland) Philipp Muntwiler	Erima	Planet Pure
Winterthur	(Germany) Ralf Loose	(Switzerland) Davide Callà	gpard	Keller, Init7

=== Managerial changes ===
Team	Outgoing manager	Manner of departure	Date of departure	Position in table	Incoming manager	Date of appointment
Thun	(Switzerland) Marc Schneider	Resigned	5 October 2020	9th	(Argentina) Carlos Bernegger	11 October 2020
Xamax	(Switzerland) Stéphane Henchoz	Sacked	13 December 2020	9th	(Switzerland) Martin Rueda	13 December 2020
Grasshoppers	(Portugal) João Carlos Pereira	Sacked	5 May 2021	1st	(Romania) Zoltán Kádár (caretaker)	5 May 2021

== League table ==
Pos	Team	Pld	W	D	L	GF	GA	GD	Pts	Promotion or relegation
1	Grasshoppers (C, P)	36	19	8	9	60	43	+17	65	Promotion to 2021–22 Swiss Super League
2	Thun (Q)	36	19	7	10	57	46	+11	64	Qualification to promotion/relegation play-offs
3	Lausanne-Ouchy	36	15	13	8	57	39	+18	58	
4	Schaffhausen	36	16	10	10	59	46	+13	58	
5	Aarau	36	17	7	12	66	59	+7	58	
6	Winterthur	36	11	10	15	50	52	−2	43	
7	Wil	36	10	9	17	43	52	−9	39	
8	Kriens	36	9	11	16	40	48	−8	38	
9	Xamax	36	10	6	20	36	58	−22	36	
10	Chiasso (R)	36	9	9	18	35	60	−25	36	Relegation to Swiss Promotion League

Updated to match(es) played on 20 May 2021. Source: Swiss Challenge League
Rules for classification: 1) Points; 2) Goal difference; 3) Goals scored; 4) Head-to-head goal difference; 5) Away goals scored; 6) Draw.
(C) Champions; (P) Promoted; (Q) Qualified for the phase indicated; (R) Relegated

== Results ==
=== First and Second Round ===
Home \ Away	AAR	CHI	GCZ	KRI	SLO	SHA	THU	WIL	WIN	XAM
Aarau	—	2–1	0–1	2–2	3–3	1–2	3–1	1–3	3–1	3–1
Chiasso	0–2	—	0–2	3–2	0–0	0–2	0–2	1–1	0–3	3–2
Grasshopper	2–1	2–1	—	2–0	2–0	2–1	1–1	3–0	3–2	3–0
Kriens	1–3	0–0	5–2	—	0–2	1–1	1–2	1–2	0–2	3–1
Lausanne-Ouchy	1–1	4–1	1–2	2–1	—	2–2	1–3	1–0	1–1	1–0
Schaffhausen	1–2	5–2	2–1	3–1	1–3	—	1–1	1–0	1–0	2–0
Thun	1–0	3–0	3–1	2–0	2–2	3–1	—	3–0	0–1	1–3
Wil	3–1	0–3	1–1	0–1	0–0	1–1	3–1	—	1–0	1–0
Winterthur	5–2	2–0	2–3	1–1	2–1	2–2	1–2	3–2	—	4–0
Xamax	2–4	2–0	1–0	0–1	0–1	0–3	1–2	2–1	2–0	—

Updated to match(es) played on 19 April 2021. Source: Swiss Challenge League (in German)
Legend: Blue = home team win; Yellow = draw; Red = away team win.

=== Third and Fourth Round ===
Home \ Away	AAR	CHI	GCZ	KRI	SLO	SHA	THU	WIL	WIN	XAM
Aarau	—	3–1	2–1	4–0	0–3	1–0	4–2	3–0	0–0	4–0
Chiasso	2–0	—	2–2	0–0	2–1	1–1	1–1	1–0	2–1	2–1
Grasshoppers	4–1	1–1	—	2–1	1–2	1–1	3–1	1–0	0–1	1–4
Kriens	0–0	2–0	1–2	—	1–1	0–1	1–1	2–2	3–0	1–1
Lausanne-Ouchy	1–1	3–0	1–1	1–2	—	2–1	2–3	3–0	4–1	1–1
Schaffhausen	3–2	1–1	0–2	2–0	1–3	—	4–0	1–1	3–3	3–0
Thun	1–3	2–0	0–2	1–0	0–2	1–0	—	3–1	0–0	0–0
Wil	7–0	3–2	1–1	0–2	2–0	2–3	1–2	—	1–1	1–0
Winterthur	3–3	0–1	2–1	0–0	1–1	1–2	2–3	1–0	—	0–1
Xamax	0–1	2–1	1–1	0–3	0–0	3–0	0–3	2–2	3–1	—

Updated to match(es) played on 20 May 2021. Source: Swiss Challenge League (in German)
Legend: Blue = home team win; Yellow = draw; Red = away team win.

== Statistics ==
=== Top scorers ===
As of 20 May 2021

Rank	Player	Club	Goals
1	(Uruguay) Rodrigo Pollero	Schaffhausen	19
2	(Switzerland) Filip Stojilković	Aarau	15
3	(Central African Republic) Louis Mafouta	Neuchâtel Xamax	14
3	(Croatia) Ivan Prtajin	Schaffhausen	14
5	(France) Yanis Lahiouel	Lausanne-Ouchy	12
6	(Switzerland) Roman Buess	Winterthur	11
6	(Palestine) Saleh Chihadeh	Thun	11
6	(Turkey) Zeki Amdouni	Lausanne-Ouchy	11
6	(Brazil) Léo Bonatini	Grasshoppers	11
10	(Kosovo) Shkelqim Demhasaj	Grasshoppers	10

== Awards ==
Swiss Football League Awards 2020
Award	Winner	Nationality	Club
Player of the Season	Asumah Abubakar	Portugal	SC Kriens

== Promotion play-offs ==
The ninth-placed team of the 2020–21 Swiss Super League, Sion, played against the runners-up of the 2020–21 Swiss Challenge League, Thun.

=== First leg ===
27 May 2021
20:30

Thun	1–4	Sion
Salanović 89'	Report	Hoarau 13', 63' (pen.); Tosetti 15'; Uldrikis 86'

Stockhorn Arena, Thun
Attendance: 100
Referee: Sandro Schärer

=== Second leg ===
30 May 2021
16:00

Sion	2–3	Thun
Tupta 30', 45+2'	Report	Dzonlagic 3'; Schmidt 38'; Havenaar 55'

Stade de Tourbillon, Sion
Attendance: 100
Referee: Fedayi San

Sion won 6–4 on aggregate.
