= Pascal Schüpbach =

Swiss footballer (born 2000)

Personal information
- Full name: Pascal David Schüpbach
- Date of birth: 11 April 2000 (age 26)
- Place of birth: Bern, Switzerland
- Height: 1.78 m (5 ft 10 in)
- Position: Full-back

Team information
- Current team: Breitenrain
- Number: 25

Youth career
- 2009–2010: Wyler
- 2010–2011: Bern
- 2011–2020: Young Boys

Senior career*
Years	Team	Apps	(Gls)
2017–2019	Young Boys II	28	(0)
2019–2022	Young Boys	1	(0)
2020–2021	→ Winterthur (loan)	9	(1)
2021–2022	→ Thun (loan)	22	(0)
2021–2022	→ Thun II (loan)	2	(0)
2022–	Breitenrain	65	(2)

International career^{‡}
2018	Switzerland U18	1	(0)
2018–2019	Switzerland U19	4	(0)
2019	Switzerland U20	7	(0)
- * Club domestic league appearances and goals as of 22 June 2025 ‡ National team caps and goals as of 13 August 2020

Pascal David Schüpbach (born 11 April 2000) is a Swiss professional footballer who plays as a full-back for Breitenrain.

== Club career ==
Schüpbach made his professional debut with Young Boys in a 3–1 Swiss Super League win over St. Gallen on 3 August 2020. On 11 August 2020, he signed a professional contract with Young Boys until 2024.

On 7 July 2021, he joined FC Thun on a season-long loan.
