= Patrick Luan =

Brazilian footballer (born 1998)

Personal information
- Full name: Patrick Luan dos Santos
- Date of birth: 31 October 1998 (age 28)
- Place of birth: Sorocaba, Brazil
- Height: 1.79 m (5 ft 10 in)
- Position: Forward

Team information
- Current team: Karmiotissa
- Number: 8

Youth career
- Sorocaba
- 2016–2017: Fluminense

Senior career*
Years	Team	Apps	(Gls)
2017–2019	Fluminense	2	(0)
2019–2022	Sion	28	(2)
2021	→ Kriens (loan)	12	(4)
2021	→ Örebro (loan)	6	(0)
2022	Sion II	13	(5)
2022–2023	Schaffhausen	24	(3)
2023–2025	Krumovgrad	31	(6)
2025–2026	Arda Kardzhali	27	(1)
2026–	Karmiotissa	4	(1)
- * Club domestic league appearances and goals as of 6 October 2026

Patrick Luan dos Santos (born 31 October 1998), known as Patrick Luan, is a Brazilian professional footballer who plays as a forward for Cypriot First Division club Karmiotissa.

== Career ==
Luan made his professional debut with Fluminense in a 1–0 Brazilian Primeira Liga loss to Internacional on 8 February 2017. In February 2019, Luan joined FC Sion in the Swiss Super League. Luan scored in his debut with Sion, a 4–1 loss to FC Basel on 19 February 2019.

On 12 August 2021, he joined Örebro in Sweden on loan until the end of 2021 season.

On 14 July 2022, Luan signed with Schaffhausen in the second-tier Swiss Challenge League. In July 2023, he joined newly promoted Bulgarian team Krumovgrad. In April 2025, Luan signed a two-and-a-half-year contract with Arda Kardzhali.
