= Bujar Lika =

Albanian footballer

Personal information
- Date of birth: 11 August 1992 (age 34)
- Place of birth: Strazhë, Kaçanik, Kosovo (then Yugoslavia)
- Height: 1.77 m (5 ft 10 in)
- Positions: Right midfielder; right-back

Team information
- Current team: Schaffhausen
- Number: 15

Youth career
- Luzern

Senior career*
Years	Team	Apps	(Gls)
2010–2013	Luzern II	55	(1)
2013–2016	Wohlen	46	(0)
2017–2018	Schaffhausen	12	(0)
2018–2019	Grasshoppers	26	(0)
2019–	Schaffhausen	161	(4)

International career^{‡}
2018–	Albania	1	(0)
- * Club domestic league appearances and goals as of 1 July 2025 ‡ National team caps and goals as of 30 March 2018

Bujar Lika (born 11 August 1992) is a footballer who plays as a midfielder or as a right-back for FC Schaffhausen in the Swiss Challenge League. Born in Yugoslavia, he represented Albania internationally.

== International career ==
Lika made his international debut for the Albania national football team in a friendly 1–0 loss to Norway on 26 March 2018.
