= Mersim Asllani =

Kosovan footballer (born 1999)

Personal information
- Date of birth: 7 June 1999 (age 27)
- Place of birth: Aigle, Switzerland
- Height: 1.78 m (5 ft 10 in)
- Position: Midfielder

Team information
- Current team: Bulle
- Number: 10

Youth career
- 2008–2011: FC Aigle
- 2011–2013: Montreux-Sports
- 2013–2014: Vevey Sports 05
- 2014–2016: Lausanne-Sport

Senior career*
Years	Team	Apps	(Gls)
2016–2018	Lausanne-Sport U21	44	(16)
2017–2019	Lausanne-Sport	23	(1)
2019–2020	Grasshoppers	15	(0)
2020–2023	Lausanne Ouchy	56	(2)
2023–	Bulle	53	(5)

International career^{‡}
2014	Switzerland U15	3	(1)
2014–2015	Switzerland U16	9	(4)
2015–2016	Switzerland U17	9	(0)
2016–2017	Switzerland U18	6	(0)
2017	Switzerland U19	5	(1)
2018–2019	Switzerland U20	8	(0)
2018–2019	Switzerland U21	2	(0)
2021–	Kosovo	1	(0)
- * Club domestic league appearances and goals as of 22 June 2025 ‡ National team caps and goals as of 8 June 2021

Mersim Asllani (born 7 June 1999) is a Kosovan professional footballer who plays as a midfielder for Swiss club Bulle and the Kosovo national team.

== Club career ==
On 13 August 2020, Asllani signed a three-year contract with Swiss Challenge League club Lausanne Ouchy. On 16 October 2020, Asllani was named as a Lausanne Ouchy substitute for the first time in a league match against Aarau. His debut with Lausanne Ouchy came eight days later in a 0–0 away draw against Wil after coming on as a substitute at 67th minute in place of Karim Gazzetta.

On 7 July 2023, Asllani moved to the Swiss Promotion League club Bulle.

== International career ==
From 2014, until 2019, Asllani was part of Switzerland at the youth international level, respectively part of the U15, U16, U17, U18, U19, U20 and U21 teams and he with these teams played 42 matches and scored six goals. On 2 June 2021, he received an urgent call-up from Kosovo for friendly matches against Guinea and Gambia. Six days later, Asllani made his debut with Kosovo in a friendly match against Guinea after coming on as a substitute in the 62nd minute in place of Jetmir Topalli.
