= Omer Dzonlagic =

Swiss footballer (born 1995)

Personal information
- Date of birth: 25 May 1995 (age 31)
- Place of birth: Meiringen, Switzerland
- Height: 1.83 m (6 ft 0 in)
- Position: Winger

Team information
- Current team: Biel-Bienne
- Number: 77

Youth career
- FC Schönbühl
- Bern

Senior career*
Years	Team	Apps	(Gls)
2013–2016	Bern	54	(21)
2016–2019	Thun U21	54	(10)
2016–2019	Thun	11	(0)
2019	→ Kriens (loan)	18	(5)
2019–2020	Kriens	26	(9)
2020–2023	Thun	74	(6)
2023–2024	Baden	28	(1)
2024–	Biel-Bienne	69	(46)
- * Club domestic league appearances and goals as of 30 September 2026

Omer Dzonlagic (born 25 May 1995) is a Swiss professional footballer who plays for Biel-Bienne.

== Career ==
Dzonlagic was loaned out from Thun to Kriens on 11 January 2019 for the rest of the season.
