= Yanis Lahiouel =

French footballer (born 1995)

Personal information
- Date of birth: 18 April 1995 (age 31)
- Place of birth: Annecy, France
- Height: 1.80 m (5 ft 11 in)
- Positions: Midfielder; striker

Team information
- Current team: Bulle
- Number: 5

Senior career*
Years	Team	Apps	(Gls)
2014–2015	Thonon Evian B	5	(0)
2016	Grand-Lancy FC		
2017	FC Bavois		
2017	Yverdon-Sport	14	(2)
2018–2021	Stade Lausanne Ouchy	102	(51)
2021–2022	Neuchâtel Xamax	33	(3)
2022–2023	Diagoras	6	(1)
2023–	Bulle	8	(4)
- * Club domestic league appearances and goals as of 26 October 2023

Yanis Lahiouel (born 18 April 1995) is a French footballer who plays as a midfielder or striker for Swiss Promotion League club Bulle.

== Early life ==
Lahiouel started playing football in La Roche-sur-Foron, France.

== Career ==
In 2018, Lahiouel signed for Swiss side Stade Lausanne Ouchy, where he was regarded as one of the club's most important players. In 2021, he signed for Swiss side Neuchâtel Xamax.

== Style of play ==
Lahiouel started playing as an attacking midfielder for Stade Lausanne Ouchy before moving up to striker.
