= Emiliano Mozzone =

Uruguayan footballer (born 1998)

Personal information
- Full name: Emiliano Gastón Mozzone Sueiro
- Date of birth: 23 April 1998 (age 28)
- Place of birth: Montevideo, Uruguay
- Height: 1.78 m (5 ft 10 in)
- Position: Forward

Team information
- Current team: Sportivo Italiano

Youth career
- 2011–2012: Danubio
- 2012–2016: Fénix

Senior career*
Years	Team	Apps	(Gls)
2016–2020	Fénix	31	(9)
2020	→ Bylis (loan)	13	(4)
2020–2021	Schaffhausen	28	(3)
2021–2022	Bellinzona	22	(4)
2023–2024	Rampla Juniors	17	(2)
2024	Cooper	8	(5)
2025–	Sportivo Italiano	0	(0)
- * Club domestic league appearances and goals as of 30 January 2025

Emiliano Gastón Mozzone Sueiro (born 23 April 1998) is a Uruguayan professional footballer who plays as a forward for Argentine Primera B Metropolitana club Sportivo Italiano.

== Career ==
A youth academy product of Fénix, Mozzone made his professional debut on 28 February 2016, coming on as a 90th minute substitute for Cecilio Waterman in a 2–0 win against Peñarol. He scored his first goal on 15 November 2017 in a 4–1 win against Montevideo Wanderers.

Mozzone signed for Albanian top division club KF Bylis in February 2020. He made his debut for the club on 8 February 2020, scoring a goal in 1–1 draw against Skënderbeu Korçë.

For the 2021–22 season, he joined Bellinzona in the third-tier Swiss Promotion League.
