= Olivier Jäckle =

Swiss footballer (born 1993)

Personal information
- Date of birth: 7 January 1993 (age 33)
- Place of birth: Switzerland
- Height: 1.83 m (6 ft 0 in)
- Position: Central midfielder

Youth career
- FC Baden

Senior career*
Years	Team	Apps	(Gls)
2011–2026	FC Aarau	375	(17)
2011	→ SC Zofingen (loan)	14	(2)

International career
2012–2014	Switzerland U20	8	(0)
2013	Switzerland U21	1	(0)
- * Club domestic league appearances and goals as of 17 May 2026

Olivier Jäckle (born 7 July 1993) is a Swiss former footballer who played as a central midfielder.
