= Saleh Chihadeh =

Palestinian footballer

Personal information
- Full name: Saleh Ahmed Saleh Chihadeh
- Date of birth: 25 August 1994 (age 32)
- Place of birth: Safuriye, Israel
- Height: 1.83 m (6 ft 0 in)
- Position: Forward

Team information
- Current team: Biel-Bienne
- Number: 9

Youth career
- 2000–2012: Naters

Senior career*
Years	Team	Apps	(Gls)
2012–2017	Naters	97	(49)
2013–2014	→ Thun II (loan)	25	(7)
2017–2019	Kriens	64	(28)
2019–2022	Thun	65	(21)
2022	Future	3	(0)
2022–2023	Naters	25	(9)
2023	Rapperswil-Jona	0	(0)
2023–2024	Kriens	15	(7)
2024–2025	YF Juventus	5	(1)
2025	Baden	0	(0)
2026	Prishtina Bern	3	(1)
2026–	Biel-Bienne	2	(1)

International career^{‡}
2018–	Palestine	13	(2)
- * Club domestic league appearances and goals as of 30 September 2026 ‡ National team caps and goals as of 20 June 2023

Saleh Chihadeh (Arabic: صالح شحادة; born 25 August 1994) is a Palestinian footballer who plays as a forward for Biel-Bienne.

== Club career ==
On 31 January 2022, Chihadeh joined Future in Egypt.

On 7 July 2023, Rapperswil-Jona announced the signing of Chihadeh. But only a month later, he left the club because the contract had been terminated for private reasons, by mutual agreement between the player and the club. On 17 August 2023, SC Kriens announced the signing of Chihadeh.

== International career ==
Chihadeh was born in Safuriye near Nazareth, Israel, and moved to Switzerland at the age of seven. He made his debut for the Palestine national football team in a friendly 2–1 win over Pakistan.

=== International goals ===
No.	Date	Venue	Opponent	Score	Result	Competition
1	11 June 2022	MFF Football Centre, Ulaanbaatar, Mongolia	Yemen	4–0	5–0	2023 AFC Asian Cup qualification
2	14 June 2022	MFF Football Centre, Ulaanbaatar, Mongolia	Philippines	1–0	4–0	2023 AFC Asian Cup qualification
