= 2022–23 Grasshopper Club Zurich season =

Grasshopper Club Zurich
2022–23 season
- Chairman: András Gurovits
- Manager: Giorgio Contini
- Stadium: Letzigrund, Zürich, Switzerland
- Swiss Super League: 7th
- Swiss Cup: Round of 16
- Top goalscorer: League: 9 goals (Japan) Hayao Kawabe; All: 9 goals (Japan) Hayao Kawabe (Azerbaijan) Renat Dadashov
- Highest home attendance: 16,974 vs Zürich (1 October 2022)
- Lowest home attendance: 3,086 vs Servette (20 October 2022)
- Average home league attendance: 6,753
- Biggest win: 4–1 vs Young Boys (26 April 2023); 4–1 vs Zürich (23 October 2022)
- Biggest defeat: 1–5 vs Basel (11 September 2022); 1–5 vs Lugano (29 April 2023)
Home colours	Away colours

The 2022–23 Grasshopper Club Zurich season was the club's second season back in the Swiss Super League, after winning promotion in 2021 and ending the previous season in 8th place, just ahead of the relegation playoff spot. The season began on 17 July 2022. Grasshoppers also participated in the Swiss Cup.

== Squad ==
=== Players ===
As of 17 March 2023

No.	Name	Nationality	Position	Date of birth (age)	at GCZ since	Former club
Goalkeepers
1	André Moreira	(Portugal)	GK	2 December 1995 (age 30)	06/2021	Belenenses
29	Manuel Kuttin	(Austria)	GK	17 December 1993 (age 32)	09/2022	Wolfsberger AC
71	Justin Hammel	(Switzerland)	GK	2 December 2000 (age 25)	06/2022	Lausanne-Ouchy
93	Lévi Ntumba	(France) (Democratic Republic of the Congo)	GK	12 January 2001 (age 25)	01/2022	Dijon
Defenders
4	Li Lei	(China)	CB	30 May 1992 (age 34)	01/2022	Beijing Guoan
14	Tomás Ribeiro	(Portugal)	LB	30 April 1999 (age 27)	01/2022	Belenenses
15	Ayumu Seko	(Japan)	CB	7 June 2000 (age 26)	01/2022	Cerezo Osaka
25	Nadjack	(Guinea-Bissau) (Portugal)	RB	6 February 1994 (age 32)	08/2020	Rio Ave
31	Dominik Schmid	(Switzerland)	LWB	10 March 1998 (age 28)	08/2020	Basel
33	Georg Margreitter	(Austria)	CB	7 November 1988 (age 38)	07/2021	Nürnberg
41	Noah Loosli	(Switzerland)	CB	23 January 1997 (age 29)	08/2021	Lausanne-Sport
51	Florian Hoxha	(Kosovo) (Switzerland)	LWB	22 February 2001 (age 25)	07/2021	own youth
77	Bendegúz Bolla	(Hungary)	RWB	22 November 1999 (age 26)	07/2021	Wolverhampton (on loan)
Midfielders
6	Amir Abrashi	(Albania) (Switzerland)	CM	27 March 1990 (age 36)	06/2021	Basel
7	Tsiy-William Ndenge	(Germany) (Cameroon)	DM	13 June 1997 (age 29)	07/2022	Luzern
8	Giotto Morandi	(Switzerland)	PM	4 March 1999 (age 27)	06/2019	own youth
10	Petar Pušić	(Switzerland) (Croatia)	AM	25 January 1999 (age 27)	02/2017	own youth
17	Dion Kacuri	(Switzerland) (Kosovo)	LW	11 February 2004 (age 22)	10/2021	own youth
20	Noah Blasucci	(Switzerland) (Italy)	AM	19 June 1999 (age 27)	09/2022	SC Brühl
23	Meritan Shabani	(Germany) (Kosovo)	AM	15 March 1999 (age 27)	07/2022	Wolverhampton
28	Christián Herc	(Slovakia)	CM	30 September 1998 (age 28)	06/2021	Wolverhampton
34	Teruki Hara	(Japan)	DM	30 July 1998 (age 28)	12/2022	Shimizu (on loan)
40	Hayao Kawabe	(Japan)	CM	8 September 1995 (age 31)	01/2022	Wolverhampton (on loan)
50	Simone Stroscio	(Switzerland)	DM	20 August 2003 (age 23)	10/2021	own youth
51	Leonardo Uka	(Kosovo)	MF	26 January 2001 (age 25)	10/2021	own youth
Forwards
9	Shkelqim Demhasaj	(Kosovo) (Switzerland)	LF	19 April 1996 (age 30)	07/2020	Luzern
22	Francis Momoh	(Nigeria)	ST	25 March 2001 (age 25)	08/2021	Heartland
27	Renat Dadashov	(Azerbaijan) (Germany)	CF	17 May 1999 (age 27)	07/2022	Wolverhampton
11	Jeong Sang-bin	(South Korea)	RW	1 April 2002 (age 24)	01/2022	Wolverhampton (on loan)
57	Filipe de Carvalho	(Switzerland)	LW	1 December 2003 (age 22)	01/2022	own youth
95	Guilherme Schettine	(Brazil)	ST	10 October 1995 (age 31)	07/2022	Braga (on loan)

Players in italic left the club during the season.

=== Players out on loan ===
Note: Flags indicate national team as defined under FIFA eligibility rules; some limited exceptions apply. Players may hold more than one non-FIFA nationality.

No.	Pos.	Nation	Player
—	MF	CHN	Jia Boyan (at Dubrava until 30 June 2023)
21	MF	GER	Robin Kalem (at Schaffhausen until 30 June 2023)
50	MF	SUI	Simone Stroscio (at Schaffhausen until 30 June 2023)
55	FW	SUI	Elmin Rastoder (at Vaduz until 30 June 2023)

=== Coaching staff ===
As of 4 January 2023

Position	Name	Since
Head coach	(Switzerland) Giorgio Contini	06/2021
Assistant coach	(Switzerland) Romain Villiger	01/2023
Athletic coach	(Switzerland) Philippe Hasler	05/2021
Athletic coach	(Austria) Florian Klausner	05/2021
Goalie Coach	(Switzerland) Jörg Stiel	05/2021
Video analyst	(Estonia) Rain Nappir	04/2021

== Transfers ==
=== In ===
Date	No.	Pos	Player	Transferred from	Fee/notes	Ref.
14 June 2022	24	MF	(Kosovo) Imran Bunjaku	(Switzerland) Aarau	Loan return	
15 June 2022	71	GK	(Switzerland) Justin Hammel	(Switzerland) Lausanne-Ouchy	Transfer	
17 June 2021	21	MF	(Germany) Robin Kalem	(Switzerland) Schaffhausen	Loan return	
17 June 2022	9	FW	(Kosovo) Shkelqim Demhasaj	(Switzerland) Winterthur	Loan return	
26 June 2022	23	MF	(North Macedonia) Nikola Gjorgjev	(Switzerland) Schaffhausen	Loan return	
27 June 2022	77	DF	(Hungary) Bendegúz Bolla	(England) Wolverhampton	Loan	
27 June 2022	7	MF	(Germany) Tsiy-William Ndenge	(Switzerland) Luzern	Free Transfer	
9 July 2022	23	MF	(Germany) Meritan Shabani	(England) Wolverhampton	Transfer	
9 July 2022	27	FW	(Azerbaijan) Renat Dadashov	(England) Wolverhampton	Transfer	
25 July 2022	95	FW	(Brazil) Guilherme Schettine	(Portugal) Braga	Loan	
28 September 2022	29	GK	(Austria) Manuel Kuttin	Free agent	Free Signing	
11 November 2022	51	MF	(Switzerland) Leonardo Uka	(Switzerland) Schaffhausen	Loan return	
29 December 2022	34	MF	(Japan) Teruki Hara	(Japan) Shimizu	Loan	

=== Out ===
Date	No.	Pos	Player	Transferred to	Fee/notes	Ref.
23 May 2022	27	GK	(Switzerland) Mateo Matic	(Switzerland) Thun	Contract Expiry	
23 May 2022	3	DF	(Kosovo) Ermir Lenjani	(Turkey) Ümraniyespor	Contract Expiry	
23 May 2022	7	MF	(Portugal) Nuno da Silva	(Switzerland) Aarau	Contract Expiry	
23 May 2022	8	MF	(Portugal) André Santos	Free agent	Contract Expiry	
23 May 2022	77	DF	(Hungary) Bendegúz Bolla	(England) Wolverhampton	End of loan	
23 May 2022	20	MF	(Portugal) Bruno Jordão	(England) Wolverhampton	End of loan	
23 May 2022	11	FW	(Brazil) Léo Bonatini	(England) Wolverhampton	End of loan	
23 May 2022	17	FW	(Senegal) Kaly Sène	(Switzerland) Basel	End of loan	
23 May 2022	94	FW	(Colombia) Brayan Riascos	(Ukraine) Metalist Kharkiv	Contract Expiry/End of loan	
14 June 2022	24	MF	(Kosovo) Imran Bunjaku	(Switzerland) Aarau	Contract Expiry	
15 June 2022	55	FW	(Switzerland) Elmin Rastoder	(Liechtenstein) Vaduz	Loan	
17 June 2022	34	DF	(Switzerland) Allan Arigoni	(Switzerland) Lugano	Contract Expiry	
26 June 2022	23	MF	(North Macedonia) Nikola Gjorgjev	(Switzerland) Aarau	Contract Expiry	
14 July 2022	21	MF	(Germany) Robin Kalem	(Switzerland) Schaffhausen	Loan	
14 July 2022	56	MF	(Switzerland) Leonardo Uka	(Switzerland) Schaffhausen	Loan	
4 January 2023	29	GK	(Austria) Manuel Kuttin	Free agent	Contract expiry	
20 January 2023	50	MF	(Switzerland) Simone Stroscio	(Switzerland) Schaffhausen	Loan	
28 February 2023	4	DF	(China) Li Lei	(China) Beijing Guoan	Contract dissolution	
17 March 2023	11	FW	(South Korea) Jeong Sang-bin	(England) Wolverhampton	Loan termination	

== Absences ==
=== Injuries and other absences ===
Past Ongoing

Start	End	No.	Pos	Player	Reason/Injury	#	Ref.
22 March 2022	6 August 2022	14	DF	(Portugal) Tomás Ribeiro	Knee injury/surgery	2 (Note: Includes only games of the current season)	
26 March 2022	2 December 2022	51	DF	(Kosovo) Florian Hoxha	ACL rupture	16	
8 July 2022	1 August 2022	50	MF	(Switzerland) Simone Stroscio	Ligament rupture	2	
9 July 2022	10 September 2022	29	FW	(South Korea) Jeong Sang-bin	Ligament rupture	8	
25 July 2022	19 August 2022	95	FW	(Brazil) Guilherme Schettine	Missing work permit	4	
5 August 2022	10 August 2022	8	MF	(Switzerland) Giotto Morandi	Muscular discomfort	1	
6 August 2022	19 August 2022	33	DF	(Austria) Georg Margreitter	Torn muscle fiber	2	
10 August 2022	26 August 2022	40	MF	(Japan) Hayao Kawabe	Muscle strain	2	
10 August 2022	3 September 2022	6	MF	(Kosovo) Amir Abrashi	Muscle strain	3	
10 August 2022	3 September 2022	4	DF	(China) Li Lei	Muscular injury	3	
13 August 2022	16 September 2022	7	MF	(Germany) Tsiy-William Ndenge	ASL injury	4	
20 August 2022	26 August 2022	27	FW	(Azerbaijan) Renat Dadashov	COVID-19	1	
9 September 2022	27 January 2023	17	MF	(Switzerland) Dion Kacuri	Midfoot fracture	12	
10 September 2022	16 September 2022	77	DF	(Hungary) Bendegúz Bolla	Unknown injury	1	
11 September 2022	31 December 2022	1	GK	(Portugal) André Moreira	Adductor longus tear	9	
1 October 2022	14 October 2022	22	FW	(Nigeria) Francis Momoh	Knee issues	2	
6 October 2022	31 December 2022	25	DF	(Guinea-Bissau) Nadjack	Patella fracture	7	
7 October 2022	14 October 2022	33	DF	(Austria) Georg Margreitter	Illness	1	
15 October 2022	11 November 2022	29	FW	(South Korea) Jeong Sang-bin	Deltoid ligament lesion	4	
23 October 2022	5 November 2022	6	MF	(Kosovo) Amir Abrashi	Shoulder injury	1	
14 January 2023	10 February 2023	95	FW	(Brazil) Guilherme Schettine	Injury	3	
19 January 2023	30 June 2023 (Note: Out until or past the end of the season)	22	FW	(Nigeria) Francis Momoh	Knee surgery	21	
1 February 2023	5 March 2023	34	MF	(Japan) Teruki Hara	Shoulder dislocation	4	
9 March 2023	2 April 2023	7	MF	(Germany) Tsiy-William Ndenge	Vein inflammation	2	
10 April 2023	20 May 2023	95	FW	(Brazil) Guilherme Schettine	Meniscus tear	6	
29 April 2023	30 June 2023	57	FW	(Switzerland) Filipe de Carvalho	Partial ACL rupture	5	

=== Suspensions ===
Yellow card accumulation Yellow-red card suspension Direct red card suspension

Date	No.	Pos	Player	Note	#	Ref.
20 August 2022	14	DF	(Portugal) Tomás Ribeiro	Denying an obvious goalscoring opportunity	1	
27 August 2022	41	DF	(Switzerland) Noah Loosli		1	
11 September 2022	41	DF	(Switzerland) Noah Loosli	Rough tackle	2	
11 September 2022	15	DF	(Japan) Ayumu Seko		1	
1 October 2022	15	DF	(Japan) Ayumu Seko	Violent conduct	3	
2 October 2022	27	FW	(Azerbaijan) Renat Dadashov	4th yellow card	1	
4 February 2023	77	DF	(Hungary) Bendegúz Bolla	4th yellow card	1	
11 February 2023	14	DF	(Portugal) Tomás Ribeiro	4th yellow card	1	
11 February 2023	95	FW	(Brazil) Guilherme Schettine	4th yellow card	1	
19 February 2023	6	MF	(Kosovo) Amir Abrashi	4th yellow card	1	
26 February 2023	28	MF	(Slovakia) Christián Herc	4th yellow card	1	
12 March 2023	27	FW	(Azerbaijan) Renat Dadashov	8th yellow card	1	
18 March 2023	40	MF	(Japan) Hayao Kawabe	4th yellow card	1	
2 April 2023	31	DF	(Switzerland) Dominik Schmid	4th yellow card	1	
11 April 2023	15	DF	(Japan) Ayumu Seko	4th yellow card	1	
16 April 2023	23	MF	(Germany) Meritan Shabani	Serious foul (high boot to the head)	3	
13 May 2023	28	MF	(Slovakia) Christián Herc	8th yellow card	1	
21 May 2023	10	MF	(Switzerland) Petar Pušić	4th yellow card	1	
25 May 2023	6	MF	(Kosovo) Amir Abrashi	8th yellow card	1	
25 May 2023	77	DF	(Hungary) Bendegúz Bolla	8th yellow card	1	

== Competitions ==
=== Overview ===
Competition	First match	Last match	Starting round	Final position	Record							
Competition	First match	Last match	Starting round	Final position	Pld	W	D	L	GF	GA	GD	Win %
Super League	24 July 2022	29 May 2023	Matchday 2	7th	36	12	8	16	56	64	−8	33.33
Swiss Cup	20 August 2022	1 February 2023	Round of 64	Last 16	3	2	0	1	10	5	+5	66.67
Total					39	14	8	17	66	69	−3	35.90

Last updated: 29 May 2023
Source: Soccerway

=== Swiss Super League ===
==== League table ====
Pos	Team	Pld	W	D	L	GF	GA	GD	Pts	Qualification or relegation
5	Basel	36	11	14	11	51	50	+1	47	Qualification for the Europa Conference League second qualifying round
6	St. Gallen	36	11	12	13	66	52	+14	45	
7	Grasshopper	36	12	8	16	56	64	−8	44	
8	Zürich	36	10	14	12	41	55	−14	44	
9	Winterthur	36	8	8	20	32	66	−34	32	

Source: Swiss Super League
Rules for classification: 1) Points; 2) Goal difference; 3) Goals scored; 4) Head-to-head goal difference; 5) Away goals scored; 6) Draw.

==== Results by Round ====
#	1	2	3	4	5	6	7	8	9	10	11	12	13	14	15	16	17	18	19	20	21	22	23	24	25	26	27	28	29	30	31	32	33	34	35	36
Ground	H	A	H	A	A	A	H	A	Z	H	A	H	Z	H	A	H	H	A	H	A	Z	A	A	H	A	H	A	H	A	H	A	H	H	Z	H	A
Result	W	D	W	D	D	L	W	L	D	D	L	L	W	L	L	W	L	D	W	L	L	L	D	W	W	W	L	L	W	W	L	L	W	L	D	L
Position	3	4	3	2	3	4	4	5	5	6	6	7	6	7	8	7	7	6	7	7	7	7	7	7	7	6	7	7	5	5	6	6	5	6	6	7
Points	3	4	7	8	9	9	12	12	13	14	14	14	17	17	17	20	20	21	24	24	24	24	25	28	31	34	34	34	37	40	40	40	43	43	44	44

A = Away; H = Home; W = Win; D = Draw; L = Loss; Z = Zürich Derby

==== Results ====
As of 29 May 2023

Win Draw Loss

17 July 2022 1	Luzern	Postponed	Grasshopper
Note: Postponed to 10 August 2022, due to a lack of viable venues on the first matchday.

24 July 2022 2	Grasshopper	2–1	Lugano	Letzigrund, Zürich
16:30 CEST (UTC+2)	Kawabe 12', 47'; Dadashov (yellow card) 90+1'	Report	79' (pen.) Celar	Attendance: 4,123; Referee: Stefan Horisberger; Assistant referees: Fedayi San (VAR)

31 July 2022 3	Young Boys	1–1	Grasshopper	Wankdorf Stadion, Bern
16:30 CEST (UTC+2)	Niasse (yellow card) 27'; Nsame 31'	Report	(yellow card) 44' Seko; 49' (yellow card) 90+4' Dadashov; (yellow card) 80' Morandi; (yellow card) 87' Moreira	Attendance: 26,210; Referee: Sandro Schärer; Assistant referees: Fedayi San (VAR); Man of the Match: André Moreira

6 August 2022 4	Grasshopper	3–2	St. Gallen	Letzigrund, Zürich
20:30 CEST (UTC+2)	Bolla (yellow card) 15'; Momoh 20'; Ndenge 45+2', 69'; Margreitter (yellow card) 85'; Pušić (yellow card) 90+6'	Report	5' (yellow card) 46' Latte Lath; 12' Schuber; (yellow card) 16' Maglica; (yellow card) 34' Witzig; (red card) 90+6' Ati-Zigi	Attendance: 6,678; Referee: Luca Piccolo; Assistant referees: Sandro Schärer (VAR); Man of the Match: Tsiy-William Ndenge

10 August 2022 1	Luzern	1–1	Grasshopper	Swissporarena, Lucerne
19:00 CEST (UTC+2)	Abubakar (yellow card) 16'; Burch 32'; Jashari (yellow card) 54'; Tasar (yellow card) 87'	Report	38' Dadashov; (yellow card) 85' Ribeiro	Attendance: 12,919; Referee: Alessandro Dudic; Assistant referees: Sven Wolfensberger (VAR); Man of the Match: Renat Dadashov

13 August 2022 5	Sion	2–2	Grasshopper	Stade Tourbillon, Sion
18:00 CEST (UTC+2)	Stojilkovic 22' (yellow card) 52'; Cavaré (red card) 54'; Araz (yellow card) 65'; Poha 67'	Report	56' Ribeiro; 63' Dadashov; (yellow card) 74' Momoh; (yellow card) 83' Nadjack	Attendance: 8,400; Referee: Stefan Horisberger; Assistant referees: Sascha Kever (VAR); Man of the Match: Renat Dadashov

27 August 2022 6	Servette	3–1	Grasshopper	Stade de Genève, Geneva
20:30 CEST (UTC+2)	Bauer (yellow card) 42'; Antunes 44'; Douline (yellow card) 65'; Stevanović 79'; Valls (yellow card) 90+5'; Fofana 90+6'	Report	(yellow card) 16' (yellow-red card) 84' Loosli; 20' (o.g.) Severin; (yellow card) 74' Bolla	Attendance: 6,450; Referee: Sven Wolfensberger; Assistant referees: Urs Schnyder (VAR)

4 September 2022 7	Grasshopper	3–0	FC Winterthur	Letzigrund, Zürich
16:30 CEST (UTC+2)	Kacuri 27'; Ribeiro 60'; Kawabe 62'	Report	(yellow card) 47' Diaby; (yellow card) 85' Manzambi	Attendance: 8,270; Referee: Nico Gianforte; Assistant referees: Sandro Schärer (VAR); Man of the Match: Dion Kacuri

11 September 2022 8	Basel	5–1	Grasshopper	St. Jakob-Park, Basel
18:00 CEST (UTC+2)	Ndyoe 3'; Males (yellow card) 13'; Zeqiri 17' (yellow card) 45+1'; Adams (yellow card) 57'; Augustin 59', 68' (pen.); Burger 73'	Report	31' (pen.) Morandi; (yellow card) 52' Abrashi; (yellow card) 57' Dadashov; (yellow card) 61' (yellow-red card) 72' Seko; (red card) 83' Loosli	Attendance: 22,109; Referee: Alain Bieri; Assistant referees: Stephan Klossner (VAR)

1 October 2022 9	Grasshopper	1–1	Zürich	Letzigrund, Zürich
20:30 CEST (UTC+2)	Bolla (yellow card) 19' (goal) 49'; Lei (yellow card) 42'; Ribeiro (yellow card) 47'; Dadashov (yellow card) 53'	Report	14' Marchesano; (yellow card) 42' Aliti; (yellow card) 69' Džemaili; (yellow card) 90' Santini	Attendance: 16,974; Referee: Lukas Fähndrich; Assistant referees: Urs Schnyder (VAR)

8 October 2022 10	Grasshopper	4–4	Sion	Letzigrund, Zürich
18:00 CEST (UTC+2)	Ndenge 5'; Schettine 8'; Bolla 49'; Kawabe 69'	Report	(yellow card) 4' Saintini; 34' (yellow card) 86' Stojilkovic; (yellow card) 52' Lavanchy; 75' Zuffi; 82' Balotelli; 84' Sio	Attendance: 4,474; Referee: Anojen Kanagasingam; Assistant referees: Sandro Schärer (VAR)

15 October 2022 11	Winterthur	1–0	Grasshopper	Schützenwiese, Winterthur
20:30 CEST (UTC+2)	Ramizi 53' (yellow card) 74' (red card) 90+7'; Gonçalves (yellow card) 70'; Gelmi (yellow card) 84'; Fayulu (yellow card) 86'; Gantenbein (yellow card) 87'	Report	(yellow card) 9' Abrashi; (yellow card) 37' Schettine; (yellow card) 43' Jeong; (yellow card) 83' Pušić	Attendance: 8,400; Referee: Luca Cibelli; Assistant referees: Sascha Kever (VAR)

20 October 2022 12	Grasshopper	2–3	Servette	Letzigrund, Zürich
20:30 CEST (UTC+2)	67', 72' Kawabe	Report	56', 60' (pen.) Fofana; 77' Pflücke; (yellow card) 90+2' Diallo	Attendance: 3,086; Referee: Stefan Horisberger; Assistant referees: Esther Staubli (VAR)

23 October 2022 13	Zürich	1–4	Grasshopper	Letzigrund, Zürich
16:30 CEST (UTC+2)	Condé (yellow card) 23'; Rohner (red card) 63'; Selnæs (yellow card) 63'; Džemaili 90' (pen.)	Report	(yellow card) 17' (goal) 30', 50' Schettine; 45+4' (yellow card) 45+5' Pušić; (yellow card) 66' (goal) 90+4' Herc; (yellow card) 86' Momoh; (yellow card) 89' Schmid	Attendance: 15,496; Referee: Luca Cibelli; Assistant referees: Alain Bieri (VAR); Man of the Match: Guilherme Schettine

29 October 2022 14	Grasshopper	1–3	Luzern	Letzigrund, Zürich
18:00 CEST (UTC+2)	Herc 43'; Kawabe (yellow card) 54'; Dadashov (yellow card) 90'	Report	9', 65' Sorgić; (yellow card) 37' Beloko; (yellow card) 45+1' Simani; 23' Burch	Attendance: 5,117; Referee: Luca Cibelli; Assistant referees: Urs Schnyder (VAR)

5 November 2022 15	St. Gallen	2–1	Grasshopper	Kybunpark, St. Gallen
18:00 CET (UTC+1)	Guillemenot 20'; Vallci (yellow card) 25'; Stillhart 55'	Report	(yellow card) 16' Loosli; (yellow card) 25' (goal) 48' Herc; (yellow card) 34' Kawabe	Attendance: 18,517; Referee: Esther Staubli; Assistant referees: Sandro Schärer (VAR)

12 November 2022 16	Grasshopper	1–0	Basel	Letzigrund, Zürich
20:30 CET (UTC+1)	Ndenge (yellow card) 2'; Dadashov 34'; Herc (yellow card) 39'; Schmid (yellow card) 51'; Schettine (yellow card) 90+4'	Report	(yellow card) 6' Pelmard; (yellow card) 39' Calafiori; (yellow card) 81' Comas	Attendance: 7,153; Referee: Alessandro Dudic; Assistant referees: Sandro Schärer (VAR); Man of the Match: Ayumu Seko

Winter Break

21 January 2023 17	Grasshopper	1–2	Young Boys	Letzigrund, Zürich
20:30 CET (UTC+1)	Dadashov (yellow card) 86'; de Carvalho 90+4'; Moreira (yellow card) 90+8'	Report	(yellow card) 37' Lustenberger; 38' Fassnacht; (yellow card) 57' Niasse; 78' Imeri; (red card) 90+8' Elia	Attendance: 5,181; Referee: Luca Cibelli; Assistant referees: Sascha Kever (VAR)

28 January 2023 18	Lugano	1–1	Grasshopper	Stadio Cornaredo, Lugano
18:00 CET (UTC+1)	Hajrizi (yellow card) 12'; Amoura (yellow card) 16'; Valenzuela (yellow card) 41'; Aliseda 88'	Report	(yellow card) 20' Abrashi; 42' Kawabe; (yellow card) 58' Schmid	Attendance: 2,841; Referee: Fedayi San; Assistant referees: Lionel Tschudi (VAR); Man of the Match: Hayao Kawabe

4 February 2023 19	Grasshopper	1–0	Basel	Letzigrund, Zürich
18:00 CET (UTC+1)	Kawabe (yellow card) 21' (goal) 90+4'; Ribeiro (yellow card) 39'; Bolla (yellow card) 66'	Report		Attendance: 5,145; Referee: Urs Schnyder; Assistant referees: Alessandro Dudic (VAR); Man of the Match: André Moreira

11 February 2023 20	Servette	2–1	Grasshopper	Stade de Genève, Geneva
18:00 CET (UTC+1)	Bedia 30', 59' (yellow card) 40'; Diallo (yellow card) 45'; Cognat (yellow card) 90+1'	Report	(yellow card) 18' Ribeiro; 57' (pen.) Dadashov; (yellow card) 71' Schettine; (yellow card) 77' Ndenge	Attendance: 5,014; Referee: Lukas Fähndrich; Assistant referees: Stephan Klossner (VAR)

19 February 2023 21	Grasshopper	1–2	Zürich	Letzigrund, Zürich
16:30 CET (UTC+1)	Dadashov 30' (pen.); Abrashi (yellow card) 57'; Loosli (yellow card) 86'	Report	(yellow card) 30' Katic; 66', 73' Tosin; (yellow card) 88' Condé	Attendance: 16,185; Referee: Urs Schyder; Assistant referees: Esther Staubli (VAR)

26 February 2023 22	Luzern	1–0	Grasshopper	Swissporarena, Lucerne
14:15 CET (UTC+1)	Frýdek 76'	Report	(yellow card) 54' Herc; (yellow card) 90' Ndenge	Attendance: 12,499; Referee: Johannes von Mandach; Assistant referees: Sandro Schärer (VAR)

5 March 2023 23	St. Gallen	1–1	Grasshopper	Kybunpark, St. Gallen
14:15 CET (UTC+1)	Karlen 33'; Witzig (yellow card) 55'; Stillhart (yellow card) 80'	Report	5' Schettine; (yellow card) 35' Seko; (yellow card) 48' Dadashov; (yellow card) 67' Morandi; (yellow card) 86' Abrashi	Attendance: 18,484; Referee: Lukas Fähndrich; Assistant referees: Esther Staubli (VAR)

12 March 2023 24	Grasshopper	2–1	Winterthur	Letzigrund, Zürich
16:30 CET (UTC+1)	Dadashov 41' (yellow card) 90+4'; Schettine (yellow card) 51' (goal) 63'; Seko (yellow card) 77'; Herc (yellow card) 90+1'	Report	(yellow card) 10' Corbaz; 47' Rodríguez; (yellow card) 53' Gonçalves	Attendance: 7,343; Referee: Sven Wolfensberger; Assistant referees: Alessandro Dudic (VAR); Man of the Match: Renat Dadashov

18 March 2023 25	Sion	1–2	Grasshopper	Stade Tourbillon, Sion
20:30 CET (UTC+1)	Itaitinga 37'; Lavanchy (yellow card) 60'; Iapichino (yellow card) 65'; Ziegler (yellow card) 84'; Balotelli (yellow card) 87'	Report	22' Shabani; (yellow card) 32' (goal) 71' Schettine; (yellow card) 64' Ribeiro; (yellow card) 73' Kawabe	Attendance: 7,000; Referee: Sven Wolfensberger; Assistant referees: Fedayi San (VAR); Man of the Match: Guilherme Schettine

2 April 2023 26	Grasshopper	2–1	Lugano	Letzigrund, Zürich
14:15 CEST (UTC+2)	Schmid (yellow card) 37'; Shabani 41' (yellow card) 56'; Pušić 67'; Dadashov (yellow card) 76'	Report	30' Celar; (yellow card) 90+3' Arigoni; (yellow card) 90+7' Daprelà	Attendance: 4502; Referee: Stefan Horisberger; Assistant referees: Urs Schnyder (VAR)

10 April 2023 27	Young Boys	2–0	Grasshopper	Wankdorf Stadion, Bern
16:30 CEST (UTC+2)	(yellow card) 46' Rieder; (yellow card) 72' (goal) 73' Zesiger; 88' Nsame	Report	(yellow card) 35' Ribeiro; (yellow card) 43' Shabani; (yellow card) 54' Seko; (yellow card) 81' Bolla	Attendance: 31,500; Referee: Luca Piccolo; Assistant referees: Sandro Schärer (VAR)

16 April 2023 28	Grasshopper	1–3	Sion	Letzigrund, Zürich
16:30 CEST (UTC+2)	Shabani (red card) 39'; Ribeiro 63'	Report	(yellow card) 14' (goal) 81' Cyprien; 45+2' Balotelli; 46' Sio; (yellow card) 54' Ziegler; (yellow card) 55' Grgic; (yellow card) 87' Fortuné	Attendance: 4,602; Referee: Anojen Kanagasingam; Assistant referees: Sandro Schärer (VAR)

22 April 2023 29	Winterthur	1–2	Grasshopper	Schützenwiese, Winterthur
18:00 CEST (UTC+2)	Diaby (red card) 22'; Buess 86' (pen.)	Report	3' Herc; (yellow card) 35' Bolla; 45+1' Dadashov; (yellow card) 84' Schmid; (yellow card) 90+5' Abrashi	Attendance: 8,400; Referee: Fedayi San; Assistant referees: Sascha Kever (VAR); Man of the Match: Hayao Kawabe

25 April 2023 30	Grasshopper	4–1	Young Boys	Letzigrund, Zürich
20:30 CEST (UTC+2)	Demhasaj 23'; Pušić 42', 78' (pen.); Lustenberger 49' (o.g.); Herc (yellow card) 83'	Report	31' Fassnacht; (yellow card) 33' Lauper	Attendance: 8704; Referee: Mirel Turkes; Assistant referees: Fedayi San (VAR); Man of the Match: Shkelqim Demhasaj

29 April 2023 31	Lugano	5–1	Grasshopper	Stadio Cornaredo, Lugano
20:30 CEST (UTC+2)	Aliseda 25', 78'; Sabbatini (yellow card) 28'; Steffen (yellow card) 38'; Macek (yellow card) 56'; Amoura 59', 64'; Celar 70'	Report	(yellow card) 10' Seko; 45+3' Demhasaj; (yellow card) 58' Herc	Attendance: 3,627; Referee: Stefan Horisberger; Assistant referees: Stephan Klossner (VAR)

7 May 2023 32	Grasshopper	2–3	Servette	Letzigrund, Zürich
16:30 CEST (UTC+2)	Shabani 7'; Dadashov (yellow card) 39'; Morandi 67'; Demhasaj (yellow card) 90+5'	Report	40' Severin; 51', 82' Stevanovic	Attendance: 4,840; Referee: Anojen Kanagasingam; Assistant referees: Lukas Fähndrich (VAR)

13 May 2023 33	Grasshopper	2–0	Luzern	Letzigrund, Zürich
18:00 CEST (UTC+2)	Bolla (yellow card) 37'; Kawabe 68'; Loosli 76'; Herc (yellow card) 90'	Report	(yellow card) 58' Schürpf; (yellow card) 67' Burch; (yellow card) 67' Müller; (yellow card) 79' Beloko	Attendance: 5,135; Referee: Stefan Horisberger; Assistant referees: Sven Wolfensberger (VAR); Man of the Match: André Moreira
Note: Originally scheduled for 14 May 2023 at 16:30, the fixture was swapped with FC St. Gallen–FC Basel, due to FC Basel's midweek Conference League semi-final fixture.

21 May 2023 34	Zürich	2–1	Grasshopper	Letzigrund, Zürich
16:30 CEST (UTC+2)	Kamberi 24'; Džemaili 54' (yellow card) 55'; Condé (yellow card) 88'	Report	8' (yellow card) 87' Pušić; (yellow card) 35' Schmid; (yellow card) 58' Abrashi	Attendance: 21,196; Referee: Luca Cibelli; Assistant referees: Sven Wolfensberger (VAR)

25 May 2023 35	Grasshopper	2–2	St. Gallen	Letzigrund, Zürich
20:30 CEST (UTC+2)	Demhasaj 3'; Loosli (yellow card) 8'; Dadashov (yellow card) 30'; Ndenge 81'; Bolla (yellow card) 86'; Moreira (yellow card) 90'; Abrashi (yellow card) 90+7'; Ribeiro (yellow card) 90+7'	Report	(yellow card) 17' Sutter; 26' Latte Lath; (yellow card) 55' von Moos; (yellow card) 74' Stergiou; (yellow card) 90+1' (goal) 90+1' Görtler	Attendance: 4,048; Referee: Luca Piccolo; Assistant referees: Sascha Kever (VAR); Man of the Match: Amir Abrashi

29 May 2023 36	Basel	3–1	Grasshopper	St. Jakob-Park, Basel
16:30 CEST (UTC+2)	Amdouni 50', 69'; Frei (yellow card) 59'; Ndoye 81'	Report	(yellow card) 26' Ndenge; (yellow card) 57' Loosli; (yellow card) 72' (goal) 90+2' Herc	Attendance: 26,611; Referee: Sven Wolfensberger; Assistant referees: Esther Staubli (VAR)

=== Swiss Cup ===
As of 1 February 2023

Win Draw Loss

Opponent's league indicated in brackets.

20 August 2022 Round of 64	FC Wettswil-Bonstetten (Canton of Zurich) (1)	0–4	Grasshopper Club Zurich	Wettswil am Albis
20:00 CEST (UTC+2)		Report	25' Momoh; 41' (pen.) Pušić; (red card) 45' Ribeiro; 71', 87' Schettine	Stadium: Sportplatz Moos; Attendance: 4,500; Referee: Fedayi San

17 September 2022 Round of 32	FC Goldstern (Canton of Bern) (3)	0–3	Grasshopper Club Zurich	Bremgarten bei Bern
17:00 CEST (UTC+2)		Report	(red card) 55' Seko; 56' Pušić; (yellow card) 63' Stroscio; 65' Demhasaj; 80' Blasucci	Stadium: Sportanlage Bremgarten; Attendance: 2,518; Referee: Nico Gianforte

1 February 2023 Round of 16	Grasshopper Club Zurich	3–5	(Basel-Stadt) FC Basel (SL)	Zürich
20:15 CET (UTC+1)	Seko 31', 73'; Dadashov 52' (pen.) (yellow card) 61'; Loosli (yellow card) 71'; Herc (yellow card) 90'	Report	29' Kade; 45+2' (pen.) Frei; 48', 90+3' Amdouni; 63' (yellow card) 89' Adams; (yellow card) 81' Salvi	Stadium: Letzigrund; Attendance: 5,029; Referee: Lukas Fähndrich

=== Pre-season and friendlies ===
As of 22 March 2023

Win Draw Loss

24 June 2022 Pre-season	Grasshopper Club Zurich	1–5	(Switzerland) FC Schaffhausen	Niederhasli, Switzerland
14:00 CEST (UTC+2)	De Carvalho 26'	Report	8', 27' Bislimi; 53' Padula; 65' Assibey-Mensah; 79' Pollero	Stadium: GC/Campus

1 July 2022 Pre-season	Yverdon-Sport FC (Switzerland)	2–0	Grasshopper Club Zurich	Yverdon-les-Bains, Switzerland
15:00 CEST (UTC+2)	Koné 67'; Beyer 85'	Report		Stadium: Stade Municipal

9 July 2022 Pre-season	1. FC Köln (Germany)	1–1	Grasshopper Club Zurich	Bad Dürrheim, Germany
15:00 CEST (UTC+2)	Schmid 56'	Report	32' Schmid	Stadium: Salinenstadion

17 July 2022 Pre-season	SV Wehen Wiesbaden (Germany)	2–3	Grasshopper Club Zurich	Wiesbaden, Germany
15:00 CEST (UTC+2)	Nilsson 5' (pen.); Froese 88'	Report	36' Morandi; 46' Kawabe; 75' Pušić	Stadium: Brita-Arena

22 September 2022 Test game	VfB Stuttgart (Germany)	2–1	Grasshopper Club Zurich	Stuttgart, Germany
15:00 CEST (UTC+2)	Ahamada 39'; Perea 84'	Report	2' Schmid	Stadium: Robert-Schlienz-Stadion

28 September 2022 3-Städte-Turnier	FC Winterthur (Switzerland)	0–1	Grasshopper Club Zurich	Uster, Switzerland
20:00 CEST (UTC+2)		Report	31' Margreitter	Stadium: Sportanlage Buchholz
Note: 45 minute game

28 September 2022 3-Städte-Turnier	FC Uster (Switzerland)	0–2	Grasshopper Club Zurich	Uster, Switzerland
21:00 CEST (UTC+2)		Report		Stadium: Sportanlage Buchholz
Note: 45 minute game

2 December 2022 Winter break	Grasshopper Club Zurich	4–1	(Austria) SC Rheindorf Altach	Niederhasli, Switzerland
14:30 CET (UTC+2)	1' Morandi; 17' Demhasaj; 20' de Carvalho; 50' Shabani	Report	72' Bukta	Stadium: GC/Campus

7 December 2022 Winter break	Grasshopper Club Zurich	0–0	(Switzerland) FC Luzern	Niederhasli, Switzerland
14:30 CET (UTC+2)		Report		Stadium: GC/Campus

10 December 2022 Winter break	FC Augsburg (Germany)	3–0	Grasshopper Club Zurich	Augsburg, Germany
14:00 CET (UTC+2)	Winther 28'; Petkov 39'; Maier 42'	Report		Stadium: WWK Arena (Training pitch); Attendance: 0
Note: Due to pitch conditions in the WWK Arena, the match was held on the training pitch without attendance.

10 January 2023 Winter break	Grasshopper Club Zurich	Cancelled	(Germany) 1. FSV Mainz 05	Jerez de la Frontera, Spain
13:00 CET (UTC+2)
Note: The test match was cancelled.

10 January 2023 Winter break	Grasshopper Club Zurich	1–1	(Germany) VfL Bochum	Jerez de la Frontera, Spain
15:00 CET (UTC+2)	Schmid 9'	Report	7' Stöger	Stadium: Barceló Montecastillo
Note: Originally scheduled for 13 January 2023. Game time is times 60 minutes.

14 January 2023 Winter break	Grasshopper Club Zurich	0–1	(Germany) Fortuna Düsseldorf	La Línea de la Concepción, Spain
14:30 CET (UTC+2)		Report	81' Karbownik	Stadium: Estadio Municipal
Note: Game time is two times 60 minutes.

18 January 2023 Winter break	Grasshopper Club Zurich	1–0	(Switzerland) FC Schaffhausen	Niederhasli, Switzerland
14:00 CET (UTC+2)	86' Morandi	Report		Stadium: GC/Campus

14 February 2023 Test game	Grasshopper Club Zurich	2–1	(Austria) FC Dornbirn 1913	Niederhasli, Switzerland
14:30 CET (UTC+2)	62' Morandi; 64' Kacuri	Report	17' Stefanon	Stadium: GC/Campus

24 March 2023 Test game	Grasshopper Club Zurich	0–2	(Switzerland) FC Wil 1900	Niederhasli, Switzerland
14:30 CET (UTC+2)		Report	18' Lukembila; 78' Staubli	Stadium: GC/Campus

== Statistics ==
=== Goalscorers ===
Rank	No.	Pos	Nat	Name	League	Cup	Total
1	27	FW	(Azerbaijan)	Renat Dadashov	8	1	9
1	40	MF	(Japan)	Hayao Kawabe	9	0	9
3	95	FW	(Brazil)	Guilherme Schettine	6	2	8
4	10	MF	(Switzerland)	Petar Pušić	5	2	7
5	28	MF	(Slovakia)	Christián Herc	5	0	5
6	7	MF	(Germany)	Tsiy-William Ndenge	4	0	4
6	9	MF	(Kosovo)	Shkelqim Demhasaj	3	1	4
8	14	DF	(Portugal)	Tomás Ribeiro	3	0	3
8	23	MF	(Germany)	Meritan Shabani	3	0	3
10	8	MF	(Switzerland)	Giotto Morandi	2	0	2
10	15	DF	(Japan)	Ayumu Seko	0	2	2
10	22	FW	(Nigeria)	Francis Momoh	1	1	2
10	77	DF	(Hungary)	Bendegúz Bolla	2	0	2
14	17	MF	(Switzerland)	Dion Kacuri	1	0	1
14	20	FW	(Switzerland)	Noah Blasucci	0	1	1
14	41	DF	(Switzerland)	Noah Loosli	1	0	1
14	57	FW	(Switzerland)	Filipe de Carvalho	1	0	1
Own goals					2	0	2
Totals					56	10	66

Last updated: 29 May 2023
Source: GCZ Statistiken

Players in italic left the club during the season.

=== Assists ===
Rank	No.	Pos	Nat	Name	League	Cup	Total
1	40	MF	(Japan)	Hayao Kawabe	8	2	10
2	10	MF	(Switzerland)	Petar Pušić	6	1	7
3	8	MF	(Switzerland)	Giotto Morandi	5	0	5
3	27	FW	(Azerbaijan)	Renat Dadashov	5	0	5
5	22	FW	(Nigeria)	Francis Momoh	4	0	4
5	77	DF	(Hungary)	Bendegúz Bolla	4	0	4
7	9	MF	(Kosovo)	Shkelqim Demhasaj	2	1	3
7	28	MF	(Slovakia)	Christián Herc	3	0	3
7	95	FW	(Brazil)	Guilherme Schettine	3	0	3
10	7	MF	(Germany)	Tsiy-William Ndenge	1	0	1
10	14	DF	(Portugal)	Tomás Ribeiro	1	0	1
10	15	DF	(Japan)	Ayumu Seko	1	0	1
10	23	MF	(Germany)	Meritan Shabani	0	1	1
10	31	DF	(Switzerland)	Dominik Schmid	1	0	1
10	41	DF	(Switzerland)	Noah Loosli	1	0	1
10	57	FW	(Switzerland)	Filipe de Carvalho	0	1	1
Totals					50	6	56

Last updated: 29 May 2023
Source: GCZ Statistiken

Players in italic left the club during the season.

=== Cards ===
Rank	No.	Pos	Nat	Name	Booking (1 pt)	Second booking (3 pts)	Straight Red (5 pts)	Pts
1	27	FW	(Azerbaijan)	Renat Dadashov	11	0	0	11
1	41	DF	(Switzerland)	Noah Loosli	3	1	1	11
3	28	MF	(Slovakia)	Christián Herc	9	0	0	9
4	6	MF	(Kosovo)	Amir Abrashi	8	0	0	8
4	15	DF	(Japan)	Ayumu Seko	5	1	0	8
4	77	DF	(Hungary)	Bendegúz Bolla	8	0	0	8
7	14	DF	(Portugal)	Tomás Ribeiro	7	0	0	7
7	23	MF	(Germany)	Meritan Shabani	2	0	1	7
9	31	DF	(Switzerland)	Dominik Schmid	6	0	0	6
9	95	FW	(Brazil)	Guilherme Schettine	6	0	0	6
11	10	MF	(Switzerland)	Petar Pušić	4	0	0	4
11	40	MF	(Japan)	Hayao Kawabe	4	0	0	4
13	1	GK	(Portugal)	André Moreira	3	0	0	3
13	7	MF	(Germany)	Tsiy-William Ndenge	3	0	0	3
15	8	MF	(Switzerland)	Giotto Morandi	2	0	0	2
15	22	FW	(Nigeria)	Francis Momoh	2	0	0	2
17	4	DF	(China)	Li Lei	1	0	0	1
17	9	MF	(Kosovo)	Shkelqim Demhasaj	1	0	0	1
17	11	FW	(South Korea)	Jeong Sang-bin	1	0	0	1
17	25	DF	(Guinea-Bissau)	Nadjack	1	0	0	1
17	33	DF	(Austria)	Georg Margreitter	1	0	0	1
Totals					88	2	2	104

Last updated: 29 May 2023
Source: GCZ Statistiken

League only.

=== Appearances ===
No.	Pos	Nat	Name	League			Cup			Total		
No.	Pos	Nat	Name	App	On	Off	App	On	Off	App	On	Off
1	GK	(Portugal)	André Moreira	28	0	1	0	0	0	28	0	1
4	DF	(China)	Li Lei	6	2	3	1	1	0	7	3	3
6	MF	(Albania)	Amir Abrashi	27	5	15	1	0	1	28	5	16
7	MF	(Germany)	Tsiy-William Ndenge	27	6	9	2	1	1	29	7	10
8	MF	(Switzerland)	Giotto Morandi	32	13	17	0	0	0	32	13	17
9	MF	(Kosovo)	Shkelqim Demhasaj	13	6	6	2	2	0	15	8	6
10	MF	(Switzerland)	Petar Pušić	34	21	9	2	2	0	36	23	9
14	DF	(Portugal)	Tomás Ribeiro	27	3	6	1	0	0	28	3	6
15	DF	(Japan)	Ayumu Seko	31	1	0	2	0	0	33	1	0
17	MF	(Switzerland)	Dion Kacuri	13	11	2	0	0	0	13	11	2
20	MF	(Switzerland)	Noah Blasucci	2	2	0	1	1	0	3	3	0
22	FW	(Nigeria)	Francis Momoh	11	6	4	1	0	1	12	6	5
23	MF	(Germany)	Meritan Shabani	26	12	12	3	1	3	29	13	15
25	DF	(Guinea-Bissau)	Nadjack	7	4	3	2	0	0	9	4	3
27	FW	(Azerbaijan)	Renat Dadashov	34	12	17	1	0	0	35	12	17
28	MF	(Slovakia)	Christián Herc	32	14	11	3	1	2	35	15	13
31	DF	(Switzerland)	Dominik Schmid	34	0	7	1	0	0	35	0	7
33	DF	(Austria)	Georg Margreitter	17	7	4	1	0	1	18	7	5
34	MF	(Japan)	Teruki Hara	12	7	2	1	0	1	13	7	3
40	MF	(Japan)	Hayao Kawabe	33	0	16	2	1	0	35	1	17
41	DF	(Switzerland)	Noah Loosli	30	6	2	2	0	0	32	6	2
50	MF	(Switzerland)	Simone Stroscio	0	0	0	2	1	0	2	1	0
57	FW	(Switzerland)	Filipe de Carvalho	18	15	2	3	0	2	21	15	4
71	GK	(Switzerland)	Justin Hammel	9	1	0	3	0	0	12	1	0
73	DF	(Kosovo)	Florian Hoxha	2	2	0	0	0	0	2	2	0
77	DF	(Hungary)	Bendegúz Bolla	33	1	7	2	2	0	35	3	7
95	FW	(Brazil)	Guilherme Schettine	19	6	11	2	1	1	21	7	12

Last updated: 29 May 2023
Source: Grasshopper Club Zurich Squad

=== Home game attendance ===
Opponent	1	2	Cup	Avg	Tot
Basel	7,153	5,145	5,029	5,776	17,327
Lugano	4,123	4,502	—	4,313	8,625
Luzern	5,117	4,135	—	4,626	9,252
Servette	3,086	4,840	—	3,963	7,926
Sion	4,474	4,602	—	4,538	9,076
St. Gallen	6,678	4,048	—	5,363	10,726
Winterthur	8,270	7,343	—	7,807	15,613
Young Boys	5,181	8,704	—	6,943	13,885
Zürich	16,974	16,185	—	16,580	33,159
Average	6,784	6,612	5,029	6,610	13,954
Total	61,056	59,504	5,029	125,589	

== Awards ==
Swiss Football League

- Player of the Round: (Japan) Hayao Kawabe (Round 2), (Azerbaijan) Renat Dadashov (3), (Portugal) André Moreira (19 & 33), (Germany) Meritan Shabani (26)
- Player of the Month: (Azerbaijan) Renat Dadashov (August 2022)
- Player of the Month (nomination): (Japan) Ayumu Seko (March 2023)

Grasshopper Club Zurich

- Player of the Season: (Portugal) André Moreira
- Goal of the Season: (Kosovo) Shkelqim Demhasaj (1–0 vs. FC St. Gallen, on 25 May 2023)

sport.ch

- Team of the Season: (Portugal) André Moreira
- Best Goalkeepers: (Portugal) André Moreira (1st)
- Best Winger: (Switzerland) Dominik Schmid (5th)
- Best offensive midfielders: (Japan) Hayao Kawabe (2nd), (Switzerland) Petar Pušić (4th)
- Best forward: (Azerbaijan) Renat Dadashov (10th)
