= Tomás Ribeiro (footballer) =

Portuguese footballer (born 1999)

Personal information
- Full name: Tomás Aresta Branco Machado Ribeiro
- Date of birth: 30 April 1999 (age 27)
- Place of birth: Lisbon, Portugal
- Height: 1.85 m (6 ft 1 in)
- Position: Centre-back

Youth career
- 2009–2012: Alta de Lisboa
- 2012–2014: CAC Pontinha
- 2014–2018: Belenenses

Senior career*
Years	Team	Apps	(Gls)
2018–2022	B-SAD	62	(1)
2022–2023	Grasshoppers	31	(3)
2023–2025	Vitória Guimarães	33	(2)
2025	Farense	9	(1)
2025–2026	Cultural Leonesa	12	(0)
- * Club domestic league appearances and goals as of 31 May 2026

Tomás Aresta Branco Machado Ribeiro (born 30 April 1999) is a Portuguese professional footballer who plays as a central defender.

== Club career ==
=== Belenenses ===
Ribeiro was born in Lisbon, and he joined C.F. Os Belenenses' youth system at the age of 15. He made his Primeira Liga debut for the renamed B-SAD on 15 September 2019, playing the entire 3–1 away win against C.S. Marítimo.

In January 2020, Ribeiro injured his right knee during training, going on to be sidelined for several months. He continued to be a starter under Petit after his recovery, scoring his first league goal on 20 February 2021 to open a 2–1 home victory over C.D. Nacional. The previous 27 December, he had been sent off for two quick yellow cards in the 1–2 loss to Sporting CP also at the Estádio Nacional, the second for handball.

=== Grasshoppers ===
On 26 January 2022, Ribeiro signed a four-and-a-half-year contract with Swiss Super League club Grasshopper Club Zürich, rejoining his compatriots and former Belenenses teammates André Moreira and André Santos. He started in his first appearance four days later, a 2–0 defeat at FC Sion. He missed the vast majority of the season, due to a meniscus injury.

Ribeiro returned to action on 6 August 2022, as a last-minute substitute against FC St. Gallen. One week later, he was directly involved in both of his team's goals, first equalising then providing the cross for Renat Dadashov in the 2–2 away draw with Sion.

=== Vitória Guimarães ===
Ribeiro returned to Portugal on 20 July 2023, on a four-year deal at Vitória de Guimarães. A starter under Álvaro Pacheco in his debut campaign, he totalled 35 games and three goals.

Subsequently, Ribeiro became a fringe player at the Minho Province side.

=== Farense ===
On 10 January 2025, Ribeiro continued in the Portuguese top division by agreeing to a two-and-a-half-year contract with S.C. Farense; Vitória remained entitled to 20% of any future transfer. He scored once in ten appearances in an eventual relegation as second-bottom, in a 3–2 away loss against S.L. Benfica in the domestic league.

=== Cultural Leonesa ===
On 13 September 2025, Ribeiro joined Spanish Segunda División club Cultural y Deportiva Leonesa. He scored his only goal on 28 October, in a 3–1 win over amateurs CD Tropezón in the first round of the Copa del Rey.

== Career statistics ==
As of match played 16 May 2026

Club	Season	League			Cup		Other		Total	
Club	Season	Division	Apps	Goals	Apps	Goals	Apps	Goals	Apps	Goals
B-SAD	2019–20	Primeira Liga	13	0	2	0	—		15	0
B-SAD	2020–21	Primeira Liga	32	1	4	0	—		36	1
B-SAD	2021–22	Primeira Liga	17	0	3	0	1	0	21	0
B-SAD	Total		62	1	9	0	1	0	72	1
Grasshopper	2021–22	Swiss Super League	4	0	—		—		4	0
Grasshopper	2022–23	Swiss Super League	27	3	1	0	—		28	3
Grasshopper	Total		31	3	1	0	—		32	3
Vitória Guimarães	2023–24	Primeira Liga	29	1	5	2	1	0	35	3
Vitória Guimarães	2024–25	Primeira Liga	4	1	0	0	2	0	6	1
Vitória Guimarães	Total		33	2	5	2	3	0	41	4
Farense	2024–25	Primeira Liga	9	1	1	0	—		10	1
Cultural Leonesa	2025–26	Segunda División	12	0	3	1	—		15	1
Career total			147	7	19	3	4	0	170	10
