= Petar Pušić =

Swiss footballer of Croatian descent (born 1999)

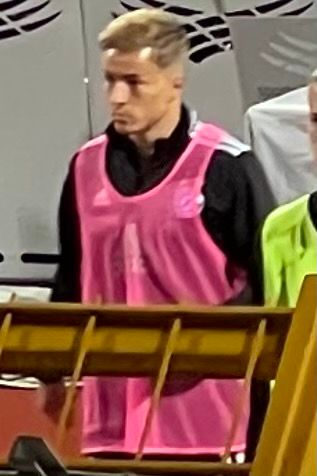
- Pušić in 2021

Personal information
- Date of birth: 25 January 1999 (age 27)
- Place of birth: Schaffhausen, Switzerland
- Height: 1.71 m (5 ft 7 in)
- Positions: Attacking midfielder; winger

Team information
- Current team: Wieczysta Kraków
- Number: 70

Youth career
- 2007–2008: Sporting Club Schaffhausen
- 2008–2011: FC Schaffhausen
- 2011–2017: Grasshoppers

Senior career*
Years	Team	Apps	(Gls)
2017–2019	Grasshoppers U21	6	(2)
2017–2023	Grasshoppers	164	(21)
2023–2025	Osijek	59	(6)
2025–	Wieczysta Kraków	19	(1)
2025–	Wieczysta Kraków II	5	(4)

International career
2013	Switzerland U15		
2014	Switzerland U16	9	(0)
2015–2016	Switzerland U17	7	(2)
2016–2017	Switzerland U18	7	(1)
2017	Switzerland U19	6	(0)
2018–2019	Switzerland U20	5	(5)
2018–2021	Switzerland U21	15	(1)
- * Club domestic league appearances and goals as of 21:15, 31 May 2026 (UTC)

Petar Pušić (born 25 January 1999) is a Swiss professional footballer who plays as a midfielder for Ekstraklasa club Wieczysta Kraków.

== Club career ==
Pušić was born in the northern Swiss town of Schaffhausen, and played for local sides Sporting Club Schaffhausen and FC Schaffhausen, before making a move to top division side Grasshoppers in 2011. He signed his first professional contract in February 2017 alongside teammates Nedim Bajrami and Arijan Qollaku, and made his debut later the same month; coming on as a substitute for Mërgim Brahimi in a 3–0 loss to Lugano.

In the following two seasons, he saw a lot more play in the main squad, with over 50 appearances, including 26 starting lineups. Following their relegation in the 2018–19 season, he accompanied Grasshopper into the Swiss Challenge League. During the two years he spent in the second Swiss league, he established himself as a mainstay of the squad and was an instrumental part of Grasshoppers's promotion back to the Swiss Super League in 2021.

Despite strong interest of Super League giants FC Basel, he chose to renew his contract with Grasshoppers in October 2021, keeping him at the club until 2023. In December 2021, he contracted COVID-19, and continued suffering symptoms past the winter break. Due to the effects of Long COVID, he missed the remainder of the season, despite returning to training in March 2022. After seven months on the sideline, he returned to active play in time for the new season, coming on for the final 20 minutes in Grasshoppers' opening win against FC Lugano.

He departed the team at the end of the 2022–23 season, after twelve years at his boyhood club. In this time, he made 181 competitive appearances and made 51 direct goal contributions (23 goals, 28 assists).

On 17 July 2023, he signed for NK Osijek in the Croatian Football League.

On 3 September 2025, Pušić signed a two-year contract with Polish I liga club Wieczysta Kraków, with an option for a third year.

== International career ==
Pušić was born in Switzerland and is of Croatian descent. He has represented Switzerland until the under-21 level. He played for the Switzerland U17 team in their unsuccessful European Under-17 Championship qualification bid in 2016, featuring in all three games of the elite round. He scored two goals for the under-17 side, both against Montenegro in 2015.

He played for the Swiss U21 squad between 2018 and 2021, making his first appearance against France in a friendly on 25 May 2018. He scored his only goal for the U21 squad against Georgia during the qualification for the 2021 U21 Euro.

== Career statistics ==
As of match played 9 May 2026

Appearances and goals by club, season and competition
Club	Season	League			National cup (Note: Includes Swiss Cup, Croatian Football Cup)		Europe		Total	
Club	Season	Division	Apps	Goals	Apps	Goals	Apps	Goals	Apps	Goals
Grasshoppers U21	2016–17	Swiss 1. Liga - 3	6	2	—		—		6	2
Grasshoppers U21	2018–19	Swiss 1. Liga - 3	1	0	—		—		1	0
Grasshoppers U21	Total		7	2	—		—		7	2
Grasshoppers	2016–17	Swiss Super League	1	0	0	0	—		1	0
Grasshoppers	2017–18	Swiss Super League	27	1	4	0	—		30	1
Grasshoppers	2018–19	Swiss Super League	21	1	2	0	—		22	1
Grasshoppers	2019–20	Swiss Challenge League	29	4	3	0	—		31	4
Grasshoppers	2020–21	Swiss Challenge League	36	9	3	0	—		39	9
Grasshoppers	2021–22	Swiss Super League	16	1	2	0	—		18	1
Grasshoppers	2022–23	Swiss Super League	34	5	3	2	—		37	7
Grasshoppers	Total		164	21	17	2	—		181	23
Osijek	2023–24	Croatian Football League	32	3	3	0	4 (Note: Appearances in UEFA Conference League)	0	32	3
Osijek	2024–25	Croatian Football League	27	3	3	0	4	1	28	4
Osijek	Total		59	6	6	0	8	1	73	7
Wieczysta Kraków	2025–26	I liga	19	1	—		—		19	1
Wieczysta Kraków II	2025–26	IV liga Lesser Poland	5	4	—		—		5	4
Career total			254	34	23	2	8	1	285	37

== Honours ==
Wieczysta Kraków II

- IV liga Lesser Poland: 2025–26
