= Nedim Bajrami =

Albanian footballer (born 1999)

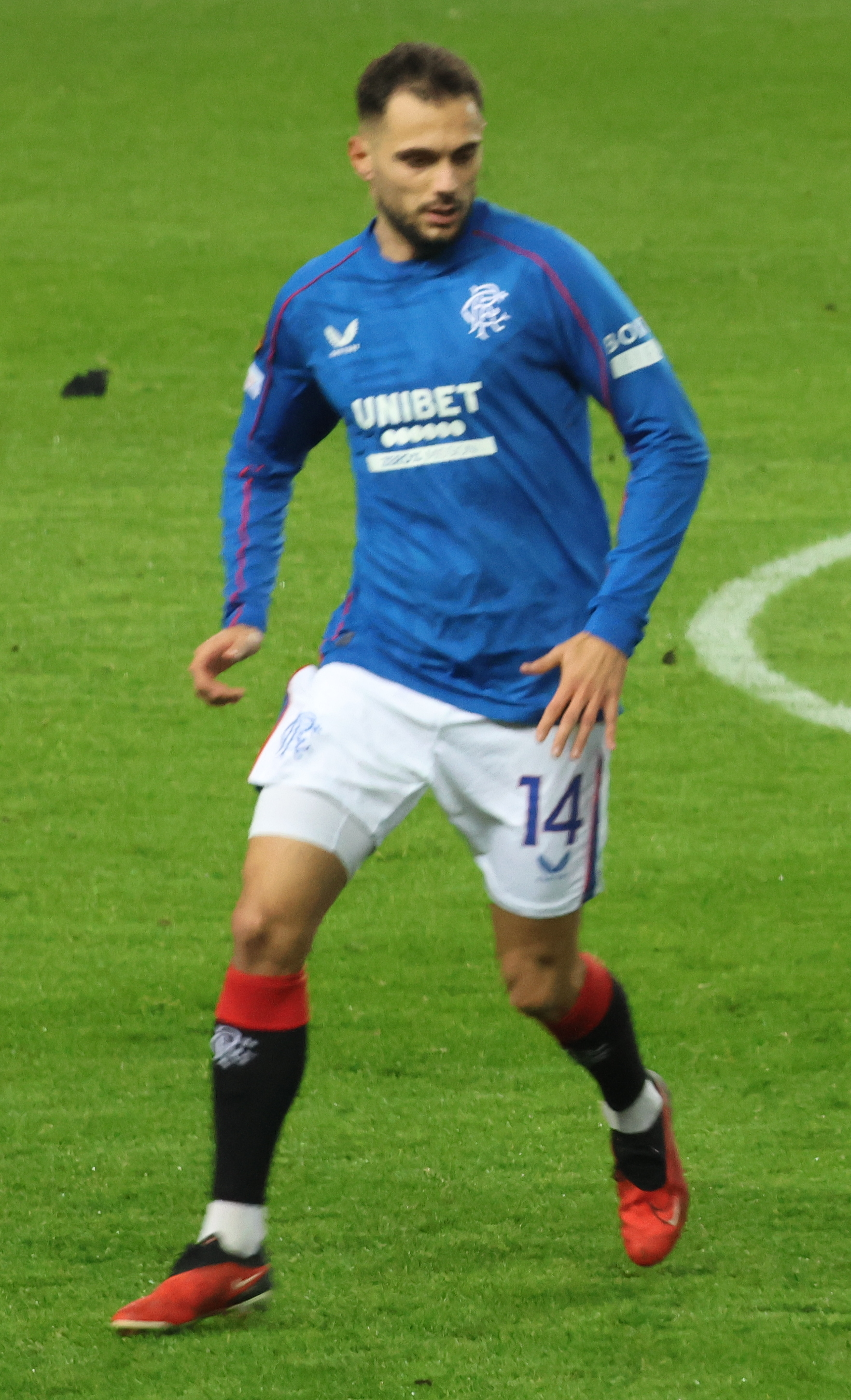
- Bajrami playing for Rangers in 2024

Personal information
- Date of birth: 28 February 1999 (age 27)
- Place of birth: Zürich, Switzerland
- Height: 1.81 m (5 ft 11 in)
- Positions: Attacking midfielder; winger

Team information
- Current team: Al Taawoun (on loan from Rangers)

Youth career
- –2009: Regensdorf
- 2009–2017: Grasshoppers

Senior career*
Years	Team	Apps	(Gls)
2015–2017	Grasshoppers U21	14	(4)
2017–2020	Grasshoppers	69	(6)
2019–2020	→ Empoli (loan)	18	(5)
2020–2023	Empoli	90	(12)
2023	→ Sassuolo (loan)	18	(1)
2023–2024	Sassuolo	30	(2)
2024–	Rangers	40	(3)
2026–	→ Al Taawoun (loan)	8	(1)

International career^{‡}
2013	Switzerland U15	5	(0)
2014	Switzerland U16	7	(0)
2015–2016	Switzerland U17	13	(5)
2016–2017	Switzerland U18	4	(0)
2016–2017	Switzerland U19	9	(3)
2018–2021	Switzerland U21	11	(1)
2021–	Albania	45	(7)
- * Club domestic league appearances and goals as of 24 October 2026 ‡ National team caps and goals as of 6 June 2026

Nedim Bajrami (born 28 February 1999) is a footballer who plays as an attacking midfielder or winger for Saudi Pro League club Al Taawoun, on loan from Scottish Premiership club Rangers. Born in Switzerland, he plays for the Albania national team.

Bajrami began his professional career at Grasshopper in Switzerland before moving to Empoli in 2019 to help the club gain promotion to Serie A in 2021. He then joined Sassuolo in 2023, and moved to Rangers in Scotland in 2024.

Internationally, he represented Switzerland at youth levels before switching allegiance to Albania in 2021. In June 2024, Bajrami represented Albania at UEFA Euro 2024 and scored the fastest goal in tournament history, after just 23 seconds.

== Club career ==
=== Early career ===
Born in Switzerland to Albanian parents from Macedonia, with his father from Tetovo and his mother from Gostivar. He is the third generation of his family in Switzerland. Bajrami grew up in Regensdorf and started playing football at age six with the local club. He was later scouted by Grasshoppers and joined their youth system from the U-8 level, progressing through all academy categories. He won the Swiss qualifying round of the Nike Cup with the U-15 team and the Swiss Cup at U-16 level.

=== Grasshoppers ===
In February 2017, he signed his first professional contract with the Grasshoppers senior team, alongside Petar Pušić and Arijan Qollaku. He made his professional debut on 5 February 2017 in the Swiss Super League, playing the full 90 minutes in a 1–0 defeat against FC Thun.

==== Breakthrough and establishment (2017–2019) ====
In the 2017–18 season, at 18 years old, Bajrami became a regular starter in Grasshoppers’ midfield, making 32 league appearances and scoring 3 goals. He scored a decisive goal in the 2–1 victory over Zürich on 21 October 2017.

In the 2018–19 season, Bajrami made 33 league appearances and scored 3 goals. He became a central figure in midfield and attracted attention from scouts abroad.

By the end of 2018–19, Bajrami had around 80 competitive appearances for Grasshoppers, scoring 6 goals, establishing himself as a key player before his move to Empoli.

=== Empoli ===
On 13 August 2019, Bajrami joined Serie B club Empoli on loan with an option to buy. During the 2019–20 season, he became a regular starter, making over 30 appearances and scoring five goals. In July 2020, Empoli exercised the purchase option and signed him on a permanent deal.

In the 2020–21 Serie B season, he scored five goals and provided eight assists as Empoli won the league and secured promotion to Serie A. On 4 May 2021, he scored in a 4–0 victory against Cosenza, confirming the club's promotion.

==== 2021–23: Serie A period, Coppa Italia, goals, assists and departure ====
On 15 August 2021, Bajrami scored the opening goal in the 2021–22 Coppa Italia first round against Vicenza in the 10th minute, with the match finishing as a 4–2 victory. On 21 August 2021, he made his Serie A debut in a 3–1 loss against Lazio. On 11 September 2021, Bajrami scored his first Serie A goal from the penalty spot in a 2–1 loss against Venezia. On 26 September 2021, he scored from the penalty spot in a 4–2 win against Bologna, marking Empoli's third victory in their opening six league matches. On 6 December 2021, he scored and assisted in a 3–1 win against Udinese, helping the club to a comeback and a third consecutive unbeaten league match at the time. On 22 December 2021, Bajrami scored once in matchday 19 fixture against Milan, finding the net in the 18th minute despite Empoli eventually being defeated 4–2. In the Coppa Italia, Bajrami also scored in the second round and in the Round of 16 in December and January respectively, where Empoli were narrowly eliminated 3–2 by Inter. On 6 January 2022, Bajrami scored a penalty in a 3–3 draw against Lazio. On 23 January 2022, he scored his sixth Serie A goal in a 2–4 loss against Roma. On 13 February 2022, Bajrami provided an assist in a 1–1 draw away to Cagliari. On 21 May 2022, he assisted Leo Štulac’s 79th‑minute goal in a 1–0 away win over Atalanta. On 24 April 2022, he assisted Andrea Pinamonti for Empoli's third goal in a 3–2 win against Napoli. During the 2021–22 Serie A season, he made 35 appearances, including 23 as a starter, scoring six goals and providing five assists.

On 1 October 2022, Bajrami scored in a 2022–23 Serie A round 8 match against Milan, with Empoli losing 3–1. On 23 January 2023, he assisted the only goal in a 1–0 win away to Inter Milan in Round 19. In the first half of the 2022–23 season, he made 18 Serie A appearances, scoring one goal and providing one assist.

Overall, Bajrami made more than 120 competitive appearances for Empoli, scoring 18 goals and providing over 20 assists.

=== Sassuolo ===
On 31 January 2023, Bajrami joined Sassuolo in Serie A on loan, with an obligation to buy reportedly set at around €7 million. He made his debut a week later against Cremonese, scoring the winning goal in stoppage time in a 3–2 victory. During the remainder of the 2022–23 Serie A season, he made 23 league appearances and provided two assists. The transfer was made permanent at the end of the season following the mandatory purchase clause.

In the 2023–24 Coppa Italia, Bajrami scored one goal in the first round, and Sassuolo were eventually eliminated in the Round of 16 after a 3–1 loss to Atalanta. On 27 September 2023, Bajrami scored his first league goal of the season in his sixth league appearance, netting in a 2–1 away win against Inter on matchday six of the 2023–24 Serie A, after which head coach Alessio Dionisi praised his performance. In April 2024, he scored a goal and provided an assist within seven minutes in the first half of a league match against Salernitana. Italian media described him as an attacking midfielder and highlighted his creativity, impact in decisive moments and ability to provide key passes. In total, he made 28 league appearances, scoring two goals and providing multiple assists.

Following Sassuolo's relegation to Serie B at the end of the 2023–24 season, transfer speculation surrounded Bajrami. Reports in August 2024 linked him with a move to Scottish club Rangers for a reported fee of around €4 million. However, Italian outlets also reported that Sassuolo were considering keeping him to play a role in their bid to return to Serie A.

=== Rangers ===
On 30 August 2024, Bajrami joined Rangers in the Scottish Premiership. On 15 September 2024, Bajrami made his debut for Rangers in the league against Dundee United, coming on as a half-time substitute in a 1–0 away win. A week later, he made his first start for Rangers in a 3–0 win over Dundee in the Scottish League Cup quarter-final, providing the assist for Rangers’ third goal. He scored his first goal for the club on his UEFA Europa League debut on 26 September 2024, netting less than a minute into a 2–0 away win against Malmö FF in the league phase. On 30 October 2024, he scored his first league goal for Rangers in his sixth appearance in the competition, striking a diagonal left-footed shot in the 63rd minute to equalise in a 1–1 draw against Aberdeen. Four days later, he scored the winning goal in the semi-final of the Scottish League Cup, as Rangers defeated Motherwell 2–1 at Hampden Park to reach the final. On 15 December 2024, in the League Cup final, Bajrami opened the scoring for Rangers in a 3–3 draw against Celtic at Hampden Park, before Rangers were defeated 5–4 in the ensuing penalty shoot-out.

By the end of the 2024–25 season, Bajrami had made 47 appearances in all competitions for Rangers, scoring five goals and providing five assists.

During the opening months of the 2025–26 season, Bajrami had a limited role in the Rangers squad, making five substitute appearances in the Premiership and the 2025–26 UEFA Champions League qualifying rounds, featuring in three qualifying matches for a combined 20 minutes as Rangers reached the play-offs before dropping into the UEFA Europa League, where he was left out of the squad list. In the 2025–26 Scottish League Cup Round of 16 on 16 August 2025, he scored the opening goal in Rangers' 4–2 victory over Alloa Athletic. Thereafter, in domestic competitions Bajrami continued to be used sparingly during September and October, featuring only as a late substitute. After starting for the Albania national team in November 2025 in their final 2026 FIFA World Cup qualification – UEFA Group K match against the England national team, Bajrami was given minutes in Rangers’ next league fixture, after having not featured for the club for a month and a half.

On 24 November 2025, Rangers dismissed sporting director Kevin Thelwell and chief executive Patrick Stewart following the short tenure of former manager Russell Martin, with reports indicating that Bajrami had not been considered for selection for an extended period under the previous management structure, before returning to receive playing time after the appointment of head coach Danny Röhl, who subsequently made positive comments about him. A week later, Bajrami made his first league start of the season, playing 75 minutes against Falkirk, and was subsequently named in the Team of the Week. Four days later, Bajrami scored his first goal of the season, converting a penalty in the 90+8th minute to secure a 2–2 draw against Dundee United. On 27 January 2026, Bajrami returned to action for Rangers after recovering from a muscle injury sustained on 6 December 2025 against Kilmarnock, when he was forced to leave the field after around 21 minutes, though the club reportedly considered a potential transfer due to limited playing opportunities this season. On 22 February 2026, Bajrami came on as a 79th-minute substitute in Rangers' 2–2 away draw against Livingston, providing an assist two minutes later for Emmanuel Fernández's goal as his side recovered from a 2–0 deficit to equalise.

=== Al Taawoun (Loan) ===
On 3 August 2026, Bajrami was signed by Al Taawoun on loan.

== International career ==
=== Switzerland ===
"We tried to convince Bajrami to continue playing for Switzerland but he told us that his heart beats for Albania. For us in the national team, identification is one of the main values, so we had no choice but to let him leave."

— Mauro's explanation for Bajrami’s switch to Albania.

Bajrami represented Switzerland at various youth levels up to the under-21 side. He featured for the Switzerland U17 team during the 2016 European Under-17 Championship qualification campaign, playing in all six matches. He scored five goals for the U17s, including a brace against Montenegro in August 2015. On 9 March 2021, Switzerland U21 manager Mauro Lustrinelli confirmed that Bajrami had chosen to switch allegiances to represent his country of origin Albania, and expects invitation from Albanian Football Association.

=== Albania ===
On 17 March 2021, he obtained Albanian citizenship, thus requiring only approval from FIFA to become eligible for the Albania national team. FIFA rejected the request, but he was subsequently cleared to play following a decision by the Court of Arbitration for Sport on 30 August 2021. He debuted with Albania in a 1–0 2022 FIFA World Cup qualification victory against Hungary on 5 September 2021, coming on as a substitute in the 63rd minute for Qazim Laçi.

Following his transfer to Sassuolo in Winter 2023, Bajrami emerged as a key goalscoring contributor for Albania, netting three consecutive goals in the UEFA Euro 2024 qualifying campaign and adding two more later in the qualifiers, totaling five goals during the campaign. His first goal came on 17 June 2023 in a 2–0 win over Moldova. He appeared in all eight qualifying matches, recording three goals and one assist, as Albania for the first time in its history finished top of the group after collecting 15 points—level with the Czech Republic but ahead on head-to-head record—and qualified for the final tournament of the UEFA European Championship for the second time in its history.

In June 2024, Bajrami was selected for the Albanian squad at UEFA Euro 2024. In Albania's opening match against defending champions Italy, he scored after 23 seconds, setting the record for the fastest goal in European Championship history, though Albania eventually lost 2–1. In the second match, he played the full 90 minutes in a 2–2 draw against Croatia, in which Albania had initially taken the lead, and he also started in the final group match against Spain, which Albania lost 1–0, resulting in their elimination from the tournament.

On 19 November 2024, he scored from the penalty spot against Ukraine in the 2024–25 UEFA Nations League B, a match Albania lost 2–1, resulting in relegation to League C. During the 2026 FIFA World Cup qualification (UEFA) campaign, Bajrami made six appearances for Albania in Group K, including three starts, in matches where the team recorded three wins and one draw without conceding a goal, and finished second in the group with 14 points to secure qualification to the play-off for the first time in its history. In the play-off on 26 March 2026 against Poland, Bajrami started in attack and played 67 minutes; in the 54th minute, he missed a clear chance from close range following a counterattack, as Albania lost 2–1 after initially taking the lead and was eliminated.

== Career statistics ==
=== Club ===
As of match played 4 November 2026

Appearances and goals by club, season and competition
Club	Season	League			National cup (Note: Includes Swiss Cup, Coppa Italia, Scottish Cup, King's Cup)		League cup (Note: Includes Scottish League Cup)		Continental		Other		Total	
Club	Season	Division	Apps	Goals	Apps	Goals	Apps	Goals	Apps	Goals	Apps	Goals	Apps	Goals
Grasshoppers U21	2015–16	Swiss 1. Liga	1	0	–		–		–		0	0	1	0
Grasshoppers U21	2016–17	Swiss 1. Liga	12	4	–		–		–		0	0	12	4
Grasshoppers U21	2017–18	Swiss 1. Liga	1	0	–		–		–		0	0	1	0
Grasshoppers U21	Total		14	4	–		–		–		0	0	14	4
Grasshoppers	2016–17	Swiss Super League	7	0	0	0	–		–		0	0	7	0
Grasshoppers	2017–18	Swiss Super League	29	3	4	0	–		–		0	0	33	3
Grasshoppers	2018–19	Swiss Super League	33	3	2	0	–		–		0	0	35	3
Grasshoppers	Total		69	6	6	0	–		–		0	0	75	6
Empoli (loan)	2019–20	Serie B	28	5	1	0	–		–		1 (Note: Appearance in Serie B promotion play-offs)	0	30	5
Empoli	2020–21	Serie B	36	5	3	2	–		–		0	0	39	7
Empoli	2021–22	Serie A	35	6	3	3	–		–		–		38	9
Empoli	2022–23	Serie A	19	1	1	0	–		–		–		20	1
Empoli	Empoli total		118	17	8	5	–		–		1	0	127	22
Sassuolo (loan)	2022–23	Serie A	18	1	0	0	–		–		–		18	1
Sassuolo	2023–24	Serie A	28	2	3	1	–		–		–		31	3
Sassuolo	2024–25	Serie B	2	0	1	0	–		–		–		3	0
Sassuolo	Sassuolo total		48	3	4	1	–		–		–		52	4
Rangers	2024–25	Scottish Premiership	28	2	2	0	3	2	11 (Note: Appearances in UEFA Europa League)	1	–		44	5
Rangers	2025–26	Scottish Premiership	12	1	2	0	2	1	3 (Note: Appearances in UEFA Champions League)	0	–		19	2
Rangers	Total		40	3	4	0	5	3	14	1	–		63	7
Al Taawoun (loan)	2026–27	Saudi Pro League	8	1	1	0	–		3 (Note: Appearances in AFC Champions League Two)	0	–		12	1
Career total			297	34	23	6	5	3	17	1	1	0	343	44

=== International ===
As of match played 6 June 2026

Appearances and goals by national team and year
National team	Year	Apps	Goals
Albania	2021	6	0
Albania	2022	4	0
Albania	2023	9	3
Albania	2024	13	3
Albania	2025	9	1
Albania	2026	4	0
Total		45	7

Scores and results list Albania's goal tally first.

List of international goals scored by Nedim Bajrami
No.	Date	Venue	Opponent	Score	Result	Competition
1.	17 June 2023	Arena Kombëtare, Tirana, Albania	Moldova	2–0	2–0	UEFA Euro 2024 qualifying
2.	20 June 2023	Tórsvøllur, Tórshavn, Faroe Islands	Faroe Islands	1–0	3–1	UEFA Euro 2024 qualifying
3.	7 September 2023	Fortuna Arena, Prague, Czech Republic	Czech Republic	1–1	1–1	UEFA Euro 2024 qualifying
4.	7 June 2024	Haladás Sportkomplexum, Szombathely, Hungary	Azerbaijan	1–0	3–1	Friendly
5.	15 June 2024	Westfalenstadion, Dortmund, Germany	Italy	1–0	1–2	UEFA Euro 2024
6.	19 November 2024	Arena Kombëtare, Tirana, Albania	Ukraine	1–2	1–2	2024–25 UEFA Nations League B
7.	14 October 2025	Arena Kombëtare, Tirana, Albania	Jordan	4–1	4–2	Friendly

== Honours ==
Empoli

- Serie B: 2020–21
