= Arijan Qollaku =

Swiss-born Albanian footballer (born 1997)

Personal information
- Date of birth: 4 February 1997 (age 29)
- Place of birth: Bülach, Switzerland
- Height: 1.82 m (6 ft 0 in)
- Position: Right back

Youth career
- –2015: Zürich
- 2016–2018: Grasshopper

Senior career*
Years	Team	Apps	(Gls)
2016–2018	Grasshopper U21	41	(2)
2017–2018	Grasshopper	5	(0)
2018	→ Schaffhausen (loan)	15	(0)
2018–2020	Schaffhausen	64	(3)
2020–2024	Aarau	49	(1)

International career
2017	Albania U21	1	(0)
- * Club domestic league appearances and goals as of 28 May 2024

Arijan Qollaku (born 4 January 1997) is a professional footballer who plays as a right back. Born in Switzerland, Qollaku represents Albania internationally.

== Club career ==
Qollaku was born in Bülach, a town in the Canton of Zürich, Switzerland and joined FC Zürich as a youth. He was released in July 2015 and spent time on trial with fellow Swiss side FC Wil, even featuring in a friendly against his former employers. However, ultimately he joined Grasshoppers in early 2016 and signed his first professional contract in February 2017 alongside teammates Nedim Bajrami and Petar Pusic. He made his debut the next month, playing 64 minutes in a 1–0 loss against Basel.

== International career ==
Qollaku was eligible to represent Kosovo and Albania in international level. He refused an invitation from Kosovo national under-21 football team to accept invitation from Albania national under-21 football team coach Alban Bushi.

Qollaku was called up to Albania U21 for the Friendly match against France U21 on 5 June 2017 and the 2019 UEFA European Under-21 Championship qualification opening match against Estonia U21 on 12 June 2017.

He received Albanian citizenship from president Bujar Nishani on 12 June 2017, the day of the opening match of the qualifiers against Estonia U21 thus couldn't participate in this match, however, he became eligible to play in the next competitive matches.

== Career statistics ==
=== Club ===
As of 23 May 2023.

Club	Season	League			Cup		Continental		Other		Total	
Club	Season	Division	Apps	Goals	Apps	Goals	Apps	Goals	Apps	Goals	Apps	Goals
Grasshoppers U21	2015–16	1. Liga - 3	13	0	0	0	–		2 (Note: Appearances in the 1. Liga Play-offs)	0	15	0
Grasshoppers U21	2016–17	1. Liga - 3	20	2	0	0	–		0	0	20	2
Grasshoppers U21	2017–18	1. Liga - 2	6	0	0	0	–		0	0	6	0
Grasshoppers U21	Total		41	2	0	0	0	0	2	0	43	2
Grasshoppers	2016–17	Swiss Super League	1	0	0	0	–		0	0	1	0
Grasshoppers	2017–18	Swiss Super League	4	0	1 (Note: Appearances in the Swiss Cup)	0	–		0	0	5	0
Grasshoppers	Total		5	0	1	0	0	0	0	0	6	0
Schaffhausen (loan)	2017–18	Swiss Challenge League	15	0	0	0	–		0	0	15	0
Schaffhausen	2018–19	Swiss Challenge League	30	1	1	0	–		0	0	31	1
Schaffhausen	2019–20	Swiss Challenge League	11	0	0	0	–		0	0	11	0
Schaffhausen	Total		56	1	1	0	0	0	0	0	57	1
Aarau	2020–21	Swiss Challenge League	5	0	0	0	–		0	0	5	0
Aarau	2021–22	Swiss Challenge League	2	0	0	0	–		0	0	2	0
Aarau	2012–23	Swiss Challenge League	28	0	0	0	–		0	0	28	0
Aarau	Total		35	0	0	0	0	0	0	0	35	0
Career total			137	2	2	0	0	0	2	0	141	2
