= Christián Herc =

Slovak footballer

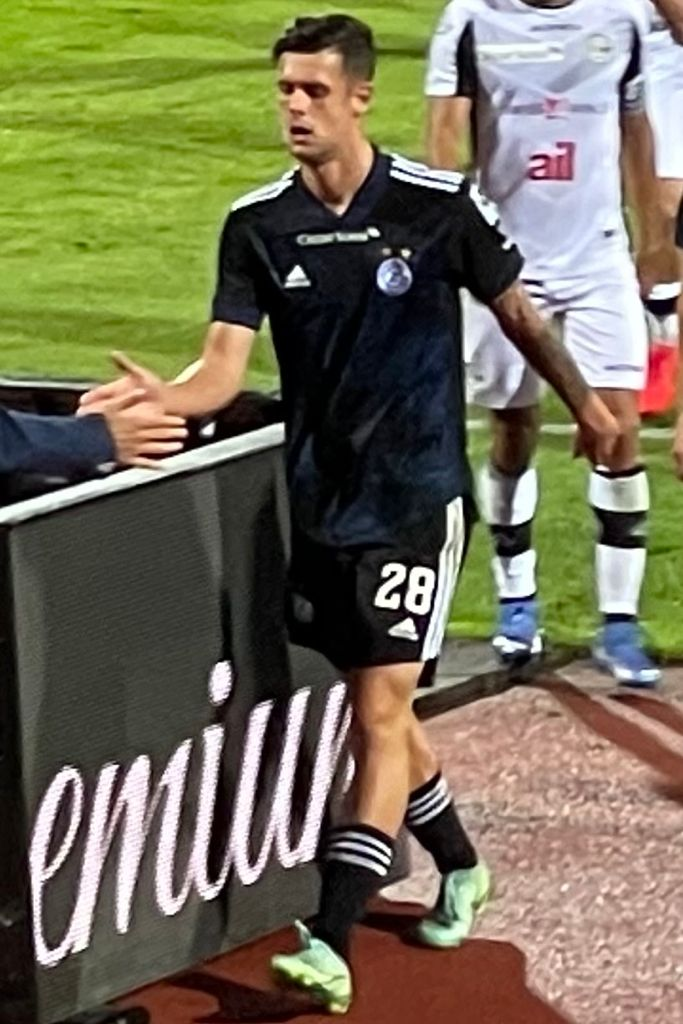

Personal information
- Date of birth: 30 September 1998 (age 28)
- Place of birth: Levice, Slovakia
- Height: 1.85 m (6 ft 1 in)
- Position: Midfielder

Team information
- Current team: Kisvárda FC

Youth career
- 2008–2015: Nitra
- 2015–2017: Wolverhampton Wanderers

Senior career*
Years	Team	Apps	(Gls)
2017–2021	Wolverhampton Wanderers	0	(0)
2018–2019	→ Dunajská Streda (loan)	42	(6)
2019–2020	→ Viktoria Plzeň (loan)	1	(0)
2020–2021	→ Karviná (loan)	31	(6)
2021–2023	Grasshoppers	66	(8)
2023–2026	Dunajská Streda	72	(2)
2026-	Kisvárda FC	0	(0)

International career^{‡}
2015	Slovakia U17	2	(0)
2015–2016	Slovakia U18	6	(2)
2016–2017	Slovakia U19	6	(1)
2017–2020	Slovakia U21	17	(4)
2022–	Slovakia	3	(0)
- * Club domestic league appearances and goals as of 17 May 2026 ‡ National team caps and goals as of 10:13, 4 June 2022 (UTC)

Christián Herc (born 30 September 1998) is a Slovak professional footballer who plays as a midfielder for Kisvárda FC and the Slovak national team.

== Club career ==
On 25 August 2020, having been recalled from his planned two-year stay with Viktoria Plzeň, Herc moved on loan to another Czech club, this time joining Karviná for the 2020–21 season. In summer 2021, Herc had signed a two-year contract with Grasshopper Club Zürich, who had regained promotion to Swiss Super League.

On 25 July 2023, he returned to Dunajská Streda, following the expiration of his contract in Switzerland.

== International career ==
On 28 September 2021, Herc received his first call-up for the Slovak senior squad for two 2022 FIFA World Cup qualifiers against Russia and Croatia. He debuted in a friendly match against Norway on 24 March 2022.

== Career statistics ==
As of matches played 29 May 2023

Club statistics
Club	Season	League			Cup		League Cup		European		Other		Total	
Club	Season	Division	Apps	Goals	Apps	Goals	Apps	Goals	Apps	Goals	Apps	Goals	Apps	Goals
Wolverhampton Wanderers U23	2016–17	Premier League 2	19	4	—		—		—		4 (Note: Appearances in EFL Trophy)	3	23	7
Wolverhampton Wanderers U23	2017–18	Premier League 2	11	2	—		—		—		—		11	2
Wolverhampton Wanderers	2018–19	Premier League	0	0	0	0	0	0	—		0	0	0	0
Wolverhampton Wanderers	2019–20	Premier League	0	0	0	0	0	0	0	0	0	0	0	0
Wolverhampton Wanderers	2020–21	Premier League	0	0	0	0	0	0	—		0	0	0	0
Wolverhampton Wanderers	Total		0	0	0	0	0	0	0	0	0	0	0	0
DAC Dunajská Streda (loan)	2017–18	Super Liga	13	3	1	0	—		—		0	0	14	3
DAC Dunajská Streda (loan)	2018–19	Super Liga	29	3	3	0	—		4 (Note: Appearances in Europa League)	0	0	0	36	3
DAC Dunajská Streda (loan)	Total		42	6	4	0	—		4	0	0	0	50	6
Viktoria Plzeň (loan)	2019–20	First League	1	0	2	0	—		0	0	0	0	3	0
Karviná (loan)	2020–21	First League	27	5	1	1	—		—		0	0	28	6
Grasshopper Club Zürich	2021–22	Super League	34	3	1	0	—		—		0	0	35	2
Grasshopper Club Zürich	2022–23	Super League	32	5	3	0	—		—		0	0	35	5
Grasshopper Club Zürich	Total		66	8	4	0	—		—		0	0	70	8
DAC Dunajská Streda	2023–24	Super Liga	0	0	0	0	—		—		0	0	0	0
Career totals			156	25	10	1	0	0	4	0	4	3	174	28
