= Noah Loosli =

Swiss footballer (born 1997)

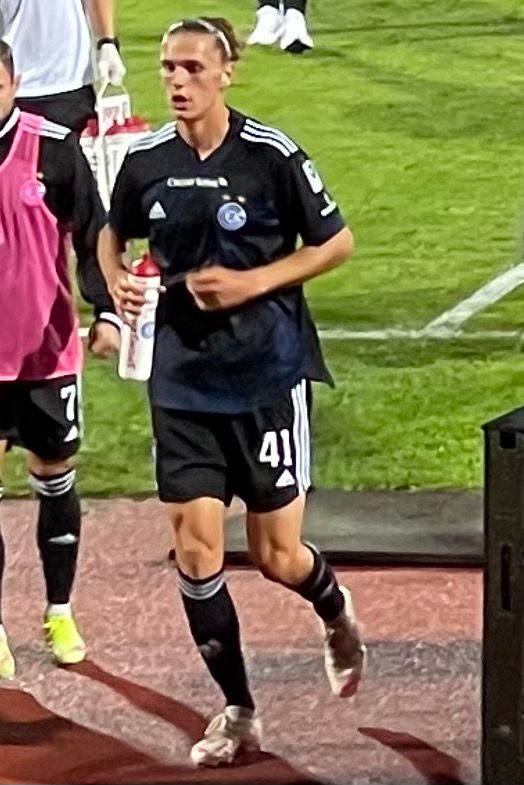
- Loosli in 2021

Personal information
- Date of birth: 23 January 1997 (age 29)
- Place of birth: Brugg, Switzerland
- Height: 1.86 m (6 ft 1 in)
- Position: Centre-back

Team information
- Current team: Universitatea Cluj
- Number: 20

Youth career
- 2001–2006: FC Windisch
- 2006–2016: Grasshoppers

Senior career*
Years	Team	Apps	(Gls)
2014–2016	Grasshoppers U21	35	(3)
2015–2018	Grasshoppers	1	(0)
2016–2017	→ Wohlen (loan)	19	(1)
2017–2018	→ Schaffhausen (loan)	12	(0)
2018–2021	Lausanne-Sport	91	(7)
2021–2023	Grasshoppers	54	(2)
2023–2026	VfL Bochum	38	(0)
2025	→ Greuther Fürth (loan)	13	(1)
2026–	Universitatea Cluj	0	(0)

International career
2013	Switzerland U16	4	(0)
2013–2014	Switzerland U17	7	(0)
2014–2015	Switzerland U18	7	(0)
2015–2016	Switzerland U19	14	(0)
2016–2017	Switzerland U20	5	(0)
2018	Switzerland U21	1	(0)
- * Club domestic league appearances and goals as of 18 May 2026

Noah Loosli (born 23 January 1997) is a Swiss professional footballer who plays as a centre-back for Liga I club Universitatea Cluj.

== Club career ==
Loosli made his professional debut in the Swiss Super League for Grasshoppers on 21 November 2015 in a game against Vaduz.

On 17 August 2021, he returned to Grasshoppers on a two-year contract.

On 13 March 2023, he signed with German Bundesliga side VfL Bochum, whom he would join for the 2023–24 season. His contract would run until summer 2026 and is valid for both Bundesliga and 2. Bundesliga.

On 28 January 2025, Loosli moved on loan to Greuther Fürth in 2. Bundesliga.

== International career ==
Loosli participated in the 2014 UEFA European Under-17 Championship with the Switzerland U17 national team.

== Career statistics ==
As of match played 17 May 2026

Appearances and goals by club, season and competition
Club	Season	League			National Cup (Note: Includes Swiss Cup, DFB-Pokal)		Europe		Other		Total	
Club	Season	Division	Apps	Goals	Apps	Goals	Apps	Goals	Apps	Goals	Apps	Goals
Grasshoppers U21	2014–15	1. Liga	13	1	—		—		—		13	1
Grasshoppers U21	2015–16	1. Liga	22	2	—		—		2 (Note: Appearances in Promotion League promotion/relegation play-offs)	0	24	2
Grasshoppers U21	Total		35	3	—		—		2	0	37	3
Grasshoppers	2015–16	Swiss Super League	1	0	0	0	—		—		1	0
Wohlen (loan)	2016–17	Swiss Challenge League	19	1	1	0	—		—		20	1
Schaffhausen (loan)	2017–18	Swiss Challenge League	12	0	2	0	—		—		14	0
Lausanne-Sport	2017–18	Swiss Super League	14	0	—		—		—		14	0
Lausanne-Sport	2018–19	Swiss Challenge League	21	4	2	0	—		—		23	4
Lausanne-Sport	2019–20	Swiss Challenge League	24	2	3	0	—		—		27	2
Lausanne-Sport	2020–21	Swiss Super League	32	1	1	0	—		—		33	1
Lausanne-Sport	Total		91	7	6	0	—		—		97	7
Grasshopper	2021–22	Swiss Super League	24	1	1	0	—		—		25	1
Grasshopper	2022–23	Swiss Super League	30	1	2	0	—		—		32	1
Grasshopper	Total		54	2	3	0	—		—		57	2
VfL Bochum	2023–24	Bundesliga	10	0	0	0	—		1 (Note: Appearances in Bundesliga promotion/relegation play-offs)	0	11	0
VfL Bochum	2024–25	Bundesliga	0	0	1	0	—		—		1	0
VfL Bochum	2025–26	2. Bundesliga	28	0	3	1	—		—		31	1
VfL Bochum	Total		38	0	4	1	—		1	0	43	1
Greuther Fürth (loan)	2024–25	2. Bundesliga	13	1	—		—		—		13	1
Universitatea Cluj	2026–27	Liga I	0	0	0	0	—		—		0	0
Career total			263	14	16	1	0	0	3	0	282	15

== Honours ==
Lausanne-Sport

- Swiss Challenge League: 2019–20
