= André Moreira =

Portuguese footballer (born 1995)

Personal information
- Full name: André Campos Moreira
- Date of birth: 2 December 1995 (age 30)
- Place of birth: Ribeirão, Portugal
- Height: 1.95 m (6 ft 5 in)
- Position: Goalkeeper

Youth career
- 2005–2013: Ribeirão

Senior career*
Years	Team	Apps	(Gls)
2013–2014	Ribeirão	16	(0)
2014–2019	Atlético Madrid	0	(0)
2014–2015	→ Moreirense (loan)	0	(0)
2015–2016	→ União Madeira (loan)	19	(0)
2016	→ Belenenses (loan)	0	(0)
2017	→ Braga (loan)	0	(0)
2018	→ Belenenses (loan)	10	(0)
2018–2019	→ Aston Villa (loan)	0	(0)
2019	→ Feirense (loan)	5	(0)
2019–2021	B-SAD	23	(0)
2021–2023	Grasshoppers	63	(0)
2023–2025	Al-Raed	42	(0)
2026	Volos	3	(0)
2026	CFR Cluj	0	(0)

International career
2014	Portugal U19	8	(0)
2014–2015	Portugal U20	9	(0)
2016	Portugal U21	1	(0)
Medal record
Men's football
Representing Portugal
UEFA European Under-19 Championship
Runner-up	2014 Hungary
- * Club domestic league appearances and goals as of 21:00, 13 May 2026 (UTC)

André Campos Moreira (born 2 December 1995) is a Portuguese professional footballer who plays as a goalkeeper.

== Club career ==
=== Early career ===
Born in Ribeirão, Vila Nova de Famalicão, Moreira was a G.D. Ribeirão youth graduate. He made his senior debut for the club on 29 December 2013, coming on as a substitute for the injured Paulo Cunha in a 2–3 home loss against AD Oliveirense in the Campeonato Nacional de Seniores.

=== Atlético Madrid ===
In August 2014, after impressing with the Portugal under-19 team at the 2014 UEFA European Championship, Moreira was sold to Jorge Mendes' GestiFute and signed a six-year deal with Atlético Madrid. He was immediately loaned to Primeira Liga side Moreirense FC, making his professional debut on 28 December 2014 by starting in a 2–0 home victory over F.C. Arouca in the group stage of the Taça da Liga.

Moreira joined C.F. União on 1 July 2015, in a season-long loan. He made his debut in the top flight on 16 August, in a 2–1 local derby defeat of C.S. Marítimo.

On 3 August 2016, Moreira was loaned to fellow top-tier club C.F. Os Belenenses. His loan was cancelled 14 days later, after the injury of Miguel Ángel Moyá. He only managed one bench appearance during his brief stint with the former, in a league game at Vitória de Setúbal.

Moreira split 2017–18 between S.C. Braga and Belenenses, only managing to appear for the latter side. On 1 August 2018, he signed for English Championship club Aston Villa on loan for the campaign, making his competitive debut 13 days later away against Yeovil Town in the first round of the EFL Cup and saving a penalty from Alex Fisher in a 1–0 win.

On 23 January 2019, Moreira returned to Atlético Madrid when his spell at Villa Park was prematurely ended without one single league appearance to his credit. The same day, still owned by the Spaniards, he moved to C.D. Feirense for five months.

=== B-SAD ===
On 17 July 2019, after five years linked to Atlético without any appearances for them, Moreira terminated his contract and returned to Belenenses, signing for the renamed B-SAD on a permanent three-year deal. During his tenure, he played second-fiddle first to Hervé Koffi and then Stanislav Kritsyuk.

=== Grasshoppers ===
Moreira agreed to a two-year contract at Grasshopper Club Zürich on 22 June 2021. He was voted as his team's best player for the 2022–23 Swiss Super League by club fans, also being awarded Best Goalkeeper by online sports site sport.ch.

In June 2023, Moreira left the Letzigrund following the expiration of his link.

=== Al-Raed ===
On 10 August 2023, Moreira joined Saudi Pro League club Al Raed FC. He suffered relegation at the end of the 2024–25 season, where he was second-choice.

=== Later career ===
Moreira remained abroad subsequently, representing in quick succession Volos F.C. of Super League Greece and CFR Cluj in the Romanian Liga I.

== International career ==
Moreira represented Portugal at the 2015 FIFA U-20 World Cup. He played all matches in New Zealand, helping his country to reach the quarter-finals.

Moreira's only cap for the under-21s occurred on 11 October 2016, in a 7–1 friendly rout of Liechtenstein.

== Career statistics ==
As of match played 6 August 2026

Appearances and goals by club, season and competition
Club	Season	League			National Cup (Note: Includes Taça de Portugal, Swiss Cup, King's Cup)		League Cup (Note: Includes Taça da Liga, EFL Cup)		Europe		Other		Total	
Club	Season	Division	Apps	Goals	Apps	Goals	Apps	Goals	Apps	Goals	Apps	Goals	Apps	Goals
Ribeirão	2013–14	Campeonato Nacional de Seniores	16	0	0	0	—		—		—		16	0
Moreirense (loan)	2014–15	Primeira Liga	0	0	0	0	2	0	—		—		2	0
União Madeira (loan)	2015–16	Primeira Liga	19	0	0	0	0	0	—		—		19	0
Belenenses (loan)	2016–17	Primeira Liga	0	0	—		—		—		—		0	0
Atlético Madrid	2016–17	La Liga	0	0	0	0	—		0	0	—		0	0
Braga (loan)	2017–18	Primeira Liga	0	0	1	0	1	0	0	0	—		2	0
Belenenses (loan)	2017–18	Primeira Liga	10	0	—		—		—		—		10	0
Aston Villa (loan)	2018–19	Championship	0	0	0	0	2	0	—		—		2	0
Feirense (loan)	2018–19	Primeira Liga	5	0	—		—		—		—		5	0
B-SAD	2019–20	Primeira Liga	15	0	2	0	0	0	—		—		17	0
B-SAD	2020–21	Primeira Liga	8	0	2	0	—		—		—		10	0
B-SAD	Total		23	0	4	0	0	0	—		—		27	0
Grasshoppers	2021–22	Swiss Super League	35	0	1	0	—		—		—		36	0
Grasshoppers	2022–23	Swiss Super League	28	0	0	0	—		—		—		28	0
Grasshoppers	Total		63	0	1	0	—		—		—		64	0
Al Raed	2023–24	Saudi Pro League	29	0	1	0	—		—		—		30	0
Al Raed	2024–25	Saudi Pro League	13	0	2	0	—		—		—		15	0
Al Raed	Total		42	0	3	0	—		—		—		45	0
Volos	2025–26	Super League Greece	3	0	—		—		—		—		3	0
CFR Cluj	2026–27	Liga I	0	0	—		—		1 (Note: Appearance in UEFA Conference League)	0	—		1	0
Career total			181	0	9	0	5	0	1	0	—		196	0

== Honours ==
Individual

- UEFA European Under-19 Championship Team of the Tournament: 2014
- Grasshopper Club Zürich Player of the Season: 2022–23
- sport.ch Best Goalkeeper: 2022–23
