= Meritan Shabani =

German footballer (born 1999)

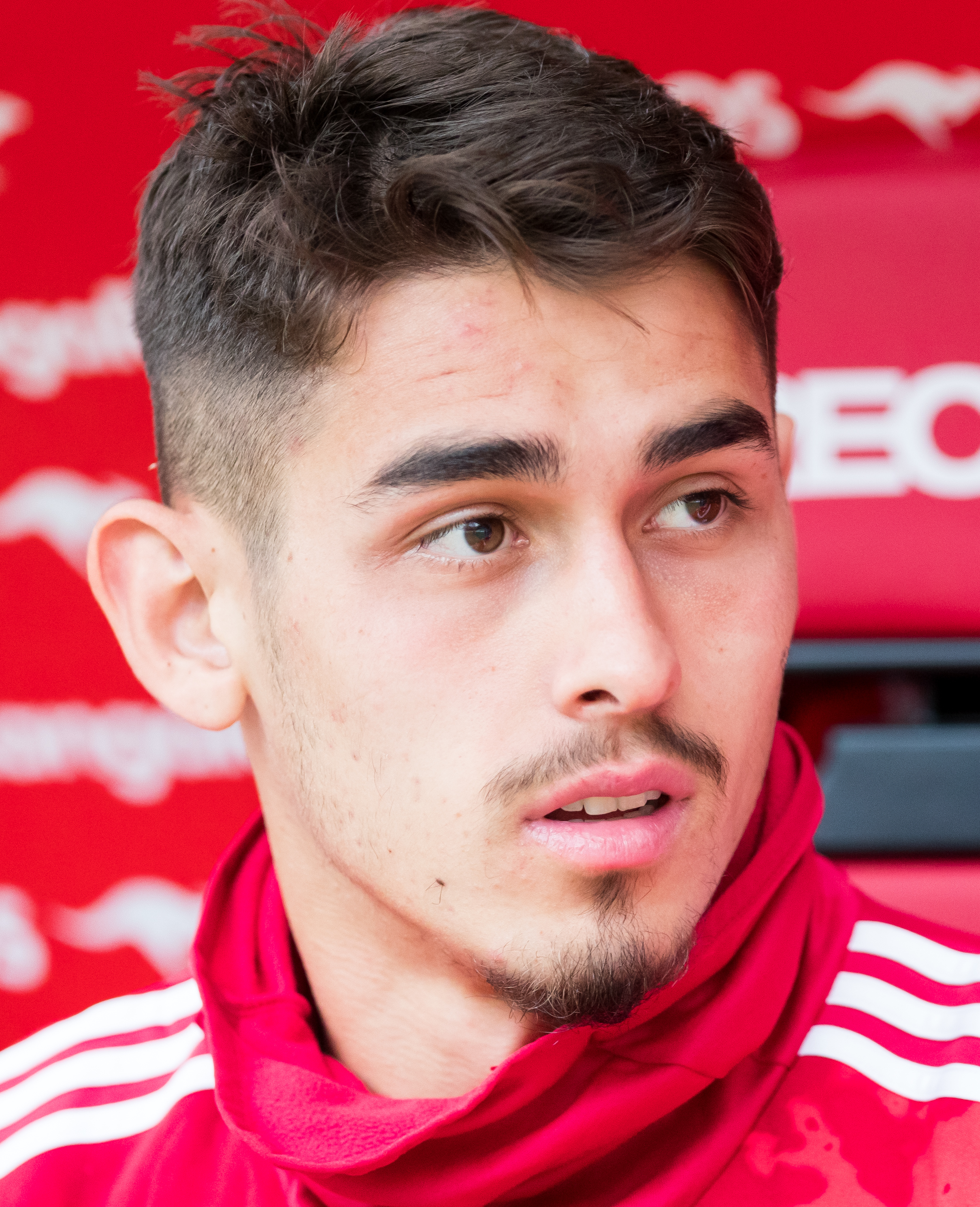
- Shabani with Bayern Munich in 2019

Personal information
- Full name: Meritan Shabani
- Date of birth: 15 March 1999 (age 27)
- Place of birth: Munich, Germany
- Height: 1.85 m (6 ft 1 in)
- Position: Attacking midfielder

Team information
- Current team: Pattaya United
- Number: 10

Youth career
- –2006: FC Phönix Schleißheim
- 2006–2018: Bayern Munich

Senior career*
Years	Team	Apps	(Gls)
2017–2019	Bayern Munich II	31	(6)
2018–2019	Bayern Munich	2	(0)
2019–2022	Wolverhampton Wanderers	0	(0)
2021	→ VVV-Venlo (loan)	5	(0)
2022–2024	Grasshoppers	31	(3)
2024–2025	Gorica	0	(0)
2025–2026	Bellinzona	13	(0)
2026–	Pattaya United	4	(0)

International career^{‡}
2018	Germany U20	2	(0)
- * Club domestic league appearances and goals as of 26 May 2026 ‡ National team caps and goals as of 09:02, 14 September 2020 (UTC)

Meritan Shabani (born 15 March 1999) is a German professional footballer who plays as an attacking midfielder for Thai League 2 club Pattaya United.

== Club career ==
=== Bayern Munich ===
In the 2017–18 season, Shabani joined the squad of Bayern Munich II. On 27 October 2017, he made his debut in the Regionalliga Bayern in a 1–1 home draw against FV Illertissen after coming on as a substitute in the 82nd minute for Fabian Benko.

On 28 April 2018, Shabani made his Bundesliga debut for the first team in a 4–1 home win against Eintracht Frankfurt, starting the match before being substituted off in the 56th minute for Thiago. On 9 May 2018, Shabani signed his first professional contract with Bayern, lasting two years until 30 June 2020.

Shabani scored his first goal for the reserve team on 5 August 2018, scoring the second goal of the match in the 45th minute of the 2–0 home win against FV Illertissen.

=== Wolverhampton Wanderers ===
On 8 August 2019, Shabani signed a three-year contract with Premier League club Wolverhampton Wanderers. Wolves reportedly paid a €1.5 million transfer fee. He made his Wolves debut as a substitute on 25 September 2019 against Reading in the 2019–20 EFL Cup third round but was stretchered off injured after less than ten minutes being on the pitch. On 27 September 2019, it was confirmed that Shabani had ruptured the anterior cruciate ligament in his right knee, requiring surgery and lengthy rehabilitation, and was therefore likely to miss the rest of the 2019–20 season.

==== Loan at VVV-Venlo ====
On 1 February 2021, Shabani signed for Eredivisie side VVV-Venlo for the remainder of the season, and a possible extension for the next season.

=== Grasshoppers ===
On 7 July 2022, Shabani signed a two-year contract with Swiss Super League club Grasshoppers, along with his Wolves teammate Renat Dadashov. He made his debut on 24 July 2022, Grasshopper's first game of the season, coming on in the last minute of regular time. He received his first starting lineup nomination on 13 August 2023, in a 2–2 away draw against FC Sion. He did not have an easy start at his new club, being allowed to only start in one more game before the winter break. After the break, he began to start more regularly, being nominated four times in a row. He repaid this trust with his first goal on 18 March 2023, scoring the opener in a 1–2 away victory against FC Sion.

On 7 October 2023, during a match against Yverdon-Sport, he suffered an injury to his cruciate ligament just nine minutes after coming on, effectively sidelining him for the remainder of the season. Having played just five games in the 2023–24 season, he departed Grasshoppers following the end of his contract.

=== HNK Gorica ===
On 15 September 2024, he signed with HNK Gorica, in the Croatian Football League. He failed to make a single appearance for the side and left the club at the end of the season.

== International career ==
In November 2016, Shabani received a call-up from Germany national under-18 team for a training camp with two friendly matches against the Republic of Ireland and the Netherlands, remaining unused on the bench in both matches. In 2018, Shabani played twice in the 2018–19 Under 20 Elite League for Germany U20s.

== Personal life ==
Shabani was born in Munich, Bavaria, Germany to Kosovar parents from Shtime.

== Career statistics ==
As of 15 September 2024

Appearances and goals by club, season and competition
Club	Season	League			National Cup		League Cup		Other		Total	
Club	Season	Division	Apps	Goals	Apps	Goals	Apps	Goals	Apps	Goals	Apps	Goals
Bayern Munich II	2017–18	Regionalliga Bayern	2	0	0	0	—				2	0
Bayern Munich II	2018–19	Regionalliga Bayern	26	6	0	0	—		1 (Note: Appearance in the 2018–19 Regionalliga promotion play-offs)	0	27	6
Bayern Munich II	2019–20	3. Liga	3	0	0	0	—				3	0
Bayern Munich II	Total		31	6	0	0	—		1	0	32	6
Bayern Munich	2017–18	Bundesliga	1	0	0	0	—				1	0
Bayern Munich	2018–19	Bundesliga	1	0	1	0	—				2	0
Bayern Munich	Total		2	0	1	0	—				3	0
Wolverhampton Wanderers	2019–20	Premier League	0	0	0	0	1 (Note: Appearance in the EFL Cup)	0	0	0	1	0
Wolverhampton Wanderers	2020–21	Premier League	0	0	0	0	0	0	3 (Note: Appearances in EFL Trophy with Wolverhampton Wanderers U23)	0	3	0
Wolverhampton Wanderers	2021–22	Premier League	0	0	0	0	0	0	0	0	0	0
Wolverhampton Wanderers	Total		0	0	0	0	1	0	3	0	4	0
VVV-Venlo (loan)	2020–21	Eredivisie	5	0	2	1	—				7	1
Grasshoppers	2022–23	Swiss Super League	26	3	3	0	—				29	3
Grasshoppers	2023–24	Swiss Super League	5	0	0	0	—				5	0
Grasshoppers	Total		31	3	3	0	—				34	3
Gorica	2024–25	HNL	0	0	0	0	—				0	0
Career total			72	9	6	1	1	0	3	0	87	11

== Honours ==
Bayern Munich

- Bundesliga: 2017–18, 2018–19

Bayern Munich II

- Regionalliga Bayern: 2018–19
- 3. Liga: 2019–20
