= Guilherme Schettine =

Brazilian footballer (born 1995)

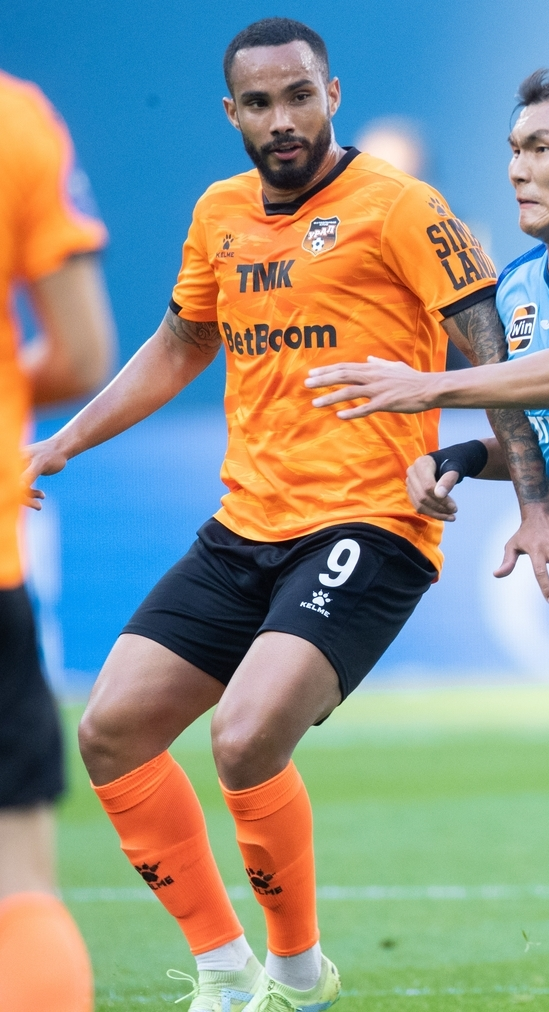

Personal information
- Full name: Guilherme Schettine Guimarães
- Date of birth: 10 October 1995 (age 31)
- Place of birth: Gama, Brazil
- Height: 1.80 m (5 ft 11 in)
- Position: Forward

Team information
- Current team: Tianjin Jinmen Tiger
- Number: 7

Youth career
- Atlético Paranaense

Senior career*
Years	Team	Apps	(Gls)
2013–2017	Atlético Paranaense	10	(1)
2015	→ Guaratinguetá (loan)	9	(2)
2016	→ Portuguesa (loan)	8	(0)
2017	→ Santa Clara (loan)	12	(2)
2017–2020	Santa Clara	39	(10)
2018	→ Al-Batin (loan)	10	(5)
2018	→ Dibba Al-Fujairah (loan)	3	(0)
2020–2023	Braga	10	(0)
2021	→ Almería (loan)	7	(0)
2021–2022	→ Vizela (loan)	28	(8)
2022–2023	→ Grasshopper (loan)	19	(6)
2023–2024	Ural Yekaterinburg	24	(2)
2024–2026	Moreirense	45	(14)
2026–	Tianjin Jinmen Tiger	24	(7)
- * Club domestic league appearances and goals as of 14:00, 8 November 2026 (UTC)

Guilherme Schettine Guimarães (born 10 October 1995), known as Guilherme Schettine or simply Guilherme, is a Brazilian professional footballer who plays as a forward for Chinese Super League club Tianjin Jinmen Tiger.

== Club career ==
Born in Gama, Distrito Federal, Guilherme was an Atlético Paranaense youth graduate. He made his first team debut on 21 April 2013, coming on as a second half substitute for goalscorer Edigar Junio in a 3–1 Campeonato Paranaense home win against fierce rivals Coritiba. Seven days later he scored his first senior goal, but in a 1–4 away loss against Operário Ferroviário.

Rarely used during the following campaigns, Guilherme was loaned to Série C side Guaratinguetá on 27 July 2015. On 30 November he moved to fellow third-tier club Portuguesa, also in a temporary deal.

Returning to Furacão in July 2016, Guilherme made his Série A on 6 October by replacing Lucho González in a 3–1 home win against Chapecoense.

On 6 July 2021, he joined Vizela on a season-long loan.

On 25 July 2022, he signed a one-year loan deal with Grasshopper in the Swiss Super League. Grasshopper have a buy option for Schettine. It would be four weeks until he could make his first appearance for the club, due to a missing work permit. On 20 August 2022, he scored two goals in his first game, a Swiss Cup match against a team from the 4th tier, after coming on in the 61st minute.

On 6 July 2023, Schettine signed with the Russian Premier League club Ural Yekaterinburg. He left Ural in June 2024.

On July 15, 2024 it was confirmed that Schettine had joined Moreirense on a deal until 2026.

On 22 January 2026, Schettine moved to Chinese Super League club Tianjin Jinmen Tiger for a reported fee of €700.000.

== Career statistics ==
As of match played 8 November 2026

Appearances and goals by club, season and competition
Club	Season	League			National cup		League cup		Continental		Other		Total	
Club	Season	Division	Apps	Goals	Apps	Goals	Apps	Goals	Apps	Goals	Apps	Goals	Apps	Goals
Atlético Paranaense	2014	Série A	8	1	0	0	—		—		—		8	1
Atlético Paranaense	2016	Série A	2	0	0	0	—		0	0	—		2	0
Atlético Paranaense	Total		10	1	0	0	0	0	0	0	0	0	10	1
Guaratinguetá (loan)	2015	Série C	9	0	0	0	—		—		—		9	0
Portuguesa (loan)	2016	Campeonato Paulista	2	0	0	0	—		—		6 (Note: Appearance(s) in the Campeonato Paulista)	0	8	0
Santa Clara (loan)	2016–17	LigaPro	12	2	1	0	—		—		—		13	2
Santa Clara	2017–18	LigaPro	6	0	0	0	—		—		—		6	0
Santa Clara	2018–19	Primeira Liga	18	7	0	0	0	0	—		—		18	7
Santa Clara	2019–20	Primeira Liga	15	3	2	0	4	0	—		—		21	3
Santa Clara	Total		39	10	2	0	4	0	—		—		45	10
Al Batin (loan)	2017–18	Saudi Pro League	8	5	2	1	—		—		—		10	6
Fujairah (loan)	2018–19	UAE Pro League	3	0	0	0	0	0	—		—		3	0
Braga	2020–21	Primeira Liga	10	0	2	0	0	0	6 (Note: Appearance(s) in the UEFA Europa League)	0	—		18	0
Almería (loan)	2020–21	Segunda División	7	0	0	0	—		—		0	0	7	0
Vizela (loan)	2021–22	Primeira Liga	28	8	3	1	1	0	—		—		32	9
Grasshopper (loan)	2022–23	Swiss Super League	19	6	2	2	—		—		—		21	8
Ural	2023–24	Russian Premier League	24	2	7	2	—		—		2 (Note: Appearances in the relegation play-offs)	0	33	4
Moreirense	2024–25	Primeira Liga	30	5	2	1	1	0	—		—		33	6
Moreirense	2025–26	Primeira Liga	15	9	0	0	—		—		—		15	9
Moreirense	Total		45	14	2	1	1	0	—		—		48	15
Tianjin Jinmen Tiger	2026	Chinese Super League	24	7	0	0	—		—		—		24	7
Career total			240	55	21	7	6	0	6	0	8	0	281	62
