= Manuel Kuttin =

Austrian footballer

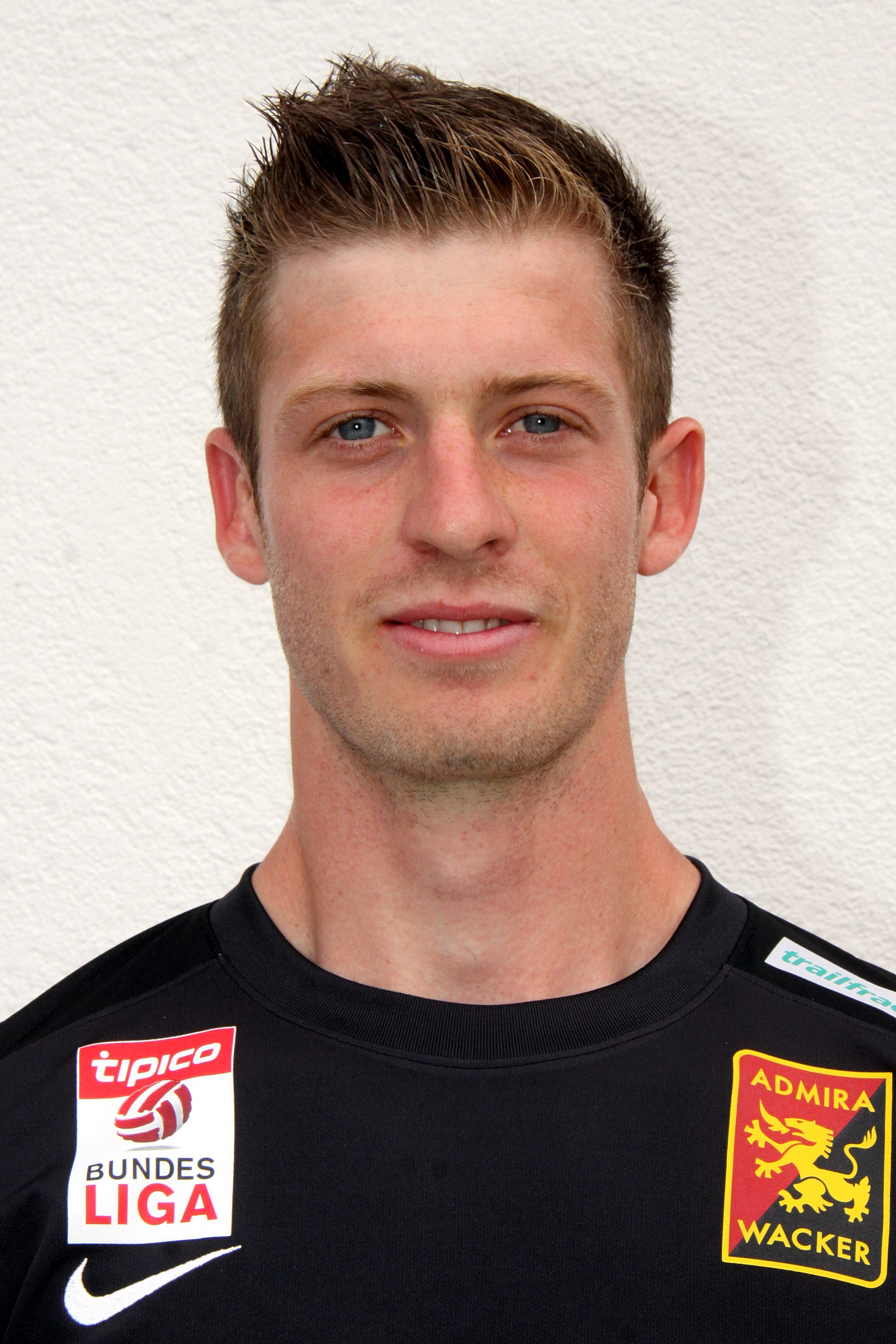

Personal information
- Date of birth: 17 December 1993 (age 32)
- Place of birth: Spittal an der Drau, Austria
- Height: 1.94 m (6 ft 4 in)
- Position: Goalkeeper

Team information
- Current team: Austria Klagenfurt
- Number: 1

Youth career
- 1998–2001: SV Stockenboi
- 2001–2004: SG Nessl Drautal
- 2004–2005: SV Stockenboi
- 2005–2007: SV Rothenthurn
- 2007–2008: Grazer AK
- 2008–2009: Wiener Neustadt
- 2009: Austria Wien
- 2009: Wiener Neustadt
- 2009–2011: Admira Wacker

Senior career*
Years	Team	Apps	(Gls)
2010–2019	Admira Wacker II	65	(0)
2013–2019	Admira Wacker	44	(0)
2019–2022	Wolfsberger AC	24	(0)
2021–2022	Wolfsberger AC II	2	(0)
2022–2023	Grasshoppers	0	(0)
2023–2025	Grasshoppers	2	(0)
2025–	Austria Klagenfurt	6	(0)

International career
2010–2011	Austria U18		
- * Club domestic league appearances and goals as of 17 May 2026

Manuel Kuttin (born 17 December 1993) is an Austrian professional footballer who plays as a goalkeeper for Austria Klagenfurt in the Austrian 2. Liga.

== Club career ==
=== Grasshopper Club Zürich ===
He previously was the backup goalkeeper of Grasshopper Club Zürich in the Swiss Super League between 2023 and 2025. He had previously joined Grasshoppers in 2022 for a brief sting.

=== Austria Klagenfurt ===
On 23 June 2025, he was announced as recently relegated Austria Klagenfurt's new goalkeeper. He started the first five games in the 2. Bundesliga as captain of his side, but was subbed of with a tendon injury on 29 August 2025 just after half-time in a home game against Admira Wacker. At the time of his injury, the game was level at 0–0 and Klagenfurt would then go on to lose 0–4.

== Club statistics ==
As of match played 6 July 2014

Club	Season	League		Cup		League Cup		Europe		Total	
Club	Season	Apps	Goals	Apps	Goals	Apps	Goals	Apps	Goals	Apps	Goals
Admira Wacker
Admira Wacker	2013–14	22	0	2	0	0	0	0	0	24	0
Admira Wacker	2014–15	8	0	1	0	0	0	0	0	9	0
Admira Wacker	2015–16	1	0	3	0	0	0	0	0	4	0
Admira Wacker	Total	31	0	6	0	0	0	0	0	37	0
Career Total		31	0	6	0	0	0	0	0	37	0
