= Noah Blasucci =

Swiss footballer (born 1999)

Personal information
- Full name: Noah Matteo Blasucci
- Date of birth: 19 June 1999 (age 27)
- Place of birth: Aadorf, Switzerland
- Height: 1.75 m (5 ft 9 in)
- Position: Midfielder

Team information
- Current team: Grasshoppers
- Number: 20

Youth career
- 2007–2009: SC Aadorf
- 2009–2013: FC Wil
- 2013–2018: FC St. Gallen

Senior career*
Years	Team	Apps	(Gls)
2017–2018	FC St. Gallen	0	(0)
2018–2019	FC Vaduz	4	(0)
2019	FC Sion	1	(0)
2019	FC Chiasso	0	(0)
2020	FC Rapperswil-Jona	0	(0)
2020–2021	FC Wil	9	(0)
2021–2022	SC Brühl St. Gallen	0	(0)
2022–2024	Grasshopper Club Zürich	2	(0)

International career^{‡}
2014–2015	Switzerland U16	7	(2)
2015–2016	Switzerland U17	7	(0)
2016	Switzerland U18	2	(0)
- * Club domestic league appearances and goals as of 5 June 2023 ‡ National team caps and goals as of 14:18, 11 October 2022 (UTC)

Noah Matteo Blasucci (born 19 June 1999) is a Swiss professional footballer who plays as a midfielder.
