= Renat Dadaşov =

Footballer (born 1999)

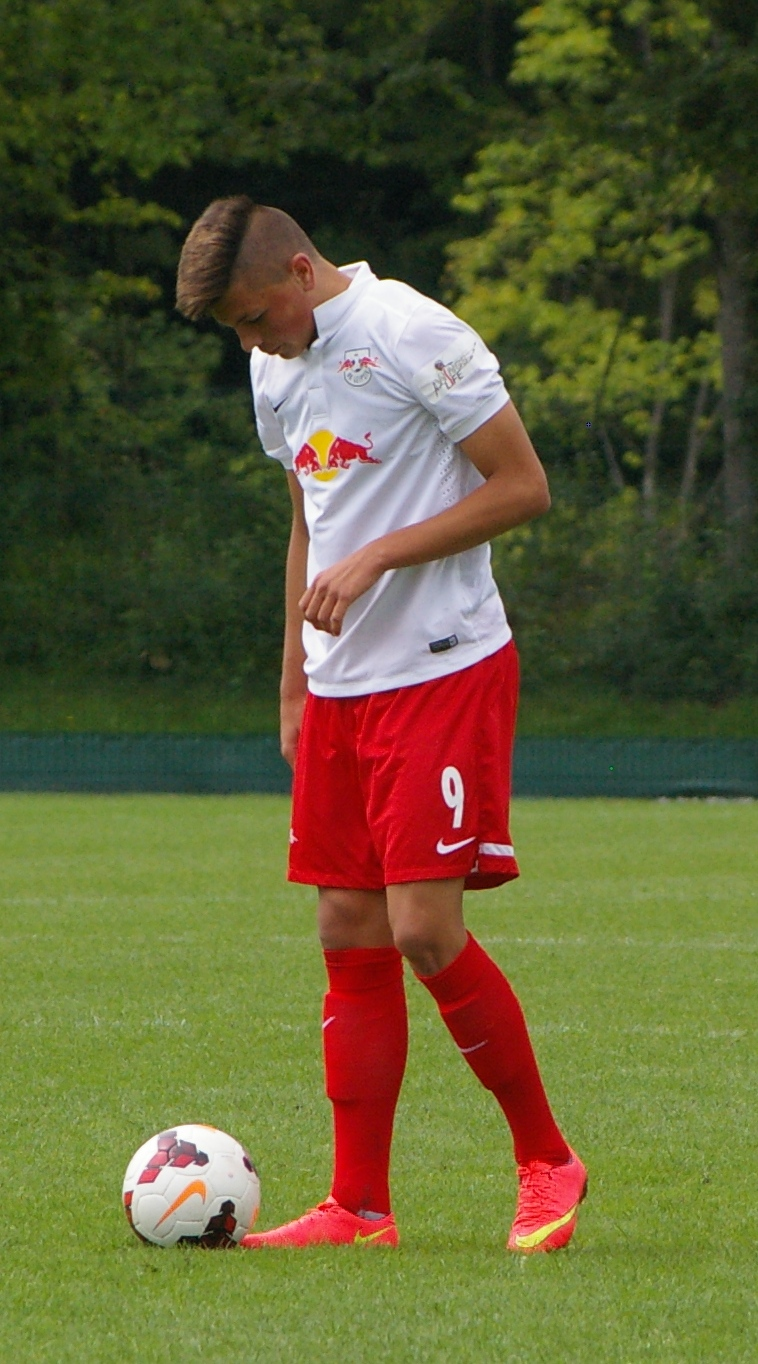
- Dadaşov playing for RB Leipzig in 2014

Personal information
- Full name: Renat Oleq oğlu Dadaşov
- Date of birth: 17 May 1999 (age 27)
- Place of birth: Rüdesheim, Germany
- Height: 1.88 m (6 ft 2 in)
- Position: Striker

Team information
- Current team: Bukovyna Chernivtsi
- Number: 9

Youth career
- TSV Bleidenstadt
- –2013: SV Wehen Wiesbaden
- 2013–2014: Eintracht Frankfurt
- 2014–2017: RB Leipzig
- 2017–2018: Eintracht Frankfurt

Senior career*
Years	Team	Apps	(Gls)
2018–2019	Estoril	22	(4)
2019–2022	Wolverhampton Wanderers	0	(0)
2019	→ Paços de Ferreira (loan)	7	(0)
2020	→ Grasshoppers (loan)	0	(0)
2021–2022	→ Tondela (loan)	30	(2)
2022–2024	Grasshoppers	38	(9)
2023–2024	→ Hatayspor (loan)	31	(6)
2024–2025	Ankaragücü	15	(2)
2025	Radomiak Radom	12	(2)
2025–2026	Motor Lublin	21	(0)
2026–	Bukovyna Chernivtsi	2	(0)

International career^{‡}
2014	Azerbaijan U16	4	(1)
2014–2015	Germany U16	6	(4)
2015–2016	Germany U17	15	(13)
2017–2018	Azerbaijan U21	2	(1)
2017–	Azerbaijan	48	(7)
- * Club domestic league appearances and goals as of 18:18, 23 September 2026 (UTC) ‡ National team caps and goals as of 16:24, 4 October 2026 (UTC)

Renat Oleq oğlu Dadaşov (Azerbaijani pronunciation: [reˈnɑt dɑˈdɑʃof]; also known as Renat Dadaschow in German; born 17 May 1999) is a professional footballer who plays as a striker for Ukrainian club Bukovyna Chernivtsi. Born in Germany, he plays for the Azerbaijan national team.

== Early years ==
Dadaşov was born in Rüdesheim am Rhein, Germany with his family being Azerbaijani. His parents moved to Germany from the Azerbaijani capital Baku. His father, Oleg, played for the Azerbaijani national water polo team during his youth. Renat has an elder brother, Rufat, who is also a striker and played 16 games for Azerbaijan national team and scored 4 goals.

During his early years, Dadaşov played at the football academies of SV Wehen Wiesbaden, Eintracht Frankfurt and RB Leipzig.

== Club career ==
=== Eintracht Frankfurt ===
On 19 May 2017, Dadaşov signed a three-year contract with Bundesliga side Eintracht Frankfurt. He scored 14 goals and 9 assists in 22 matches for Eintracht Frankfurt U-19 in the Under 19 Bundesliga.

=== Estoril ===
On 11 June 2018, Dadaşov signed a two-year contract with Estoril.

Dadaşov made his LigaPro debut for Estoril in a 4–0 home victory against Porto B on 11 August 2018. He scored his first goal for Estoril on 18 August 2018, in a 1–0 away victory against Braga B.

=== Wolverhampton Wanderers ===
On 6 August 2019, Dadaşov signed a four-year contract with Wolverhampton Wanderers.

==== Loan to Paços de Ferreira ====
On 6 August 2019, Paços de Ferreira announced the signing of Dadaşov on loan deal. He made his debut for Paços de Ferreira in the Primeira Liga on 24 August 2019, starting in the away match against Boavista, which finished as a 1–1 draw.

==== Loan to Grasshoppers ====
On 23 August 2020, Grasshopper Club Zürich announced the signing of Dadaşov on loan deal. While training with the club however, Dadaşov had sustained a cruciate knee ligament injury, and has undergone surgery, leaving him on the sidelines for a lengthy period. He would eventually return to Wolves on the 8 October to continue his treatment.

==== Loan to Tondela ====
On 29 July 2021, Dadaşov joined Primeira Liga side Tondela on a season-long loan deal.

=== Grasshoppers ===
On 7 July 2022, Dadaşov signed a two-year contract with Grasshoppers, along with his Wolves teammate Meritan Shabani. He made his debut in the team's first game of the season, coming in after the half-time break. His impact was immediate, as his first pass led to Grasshopper's second goal in the 47th minute. In the second game of the season, on 31 July 2022, he once again came on at half time and again had immediate impact, this time with his first goal for the Grasshoppers in the 49th minute of the game, equalizing for the 1–1 result. For his performance he was voted SFL Best Player of the Round by the fans, later voted the best player for the month of August.

==== Loan to Hatayspor ====
On 5 September 2023, Dadaşov renewed his contract with Grasshoppers for a further year - lasting until 2025 - and was immediately sent on a season-long loan to Süper Lig club Hatayspor.

=== Ankaragücü ===
On 8 August 2024, Dadaşov signed a two-year contract with Ankaragücü. On 20 February 2025, he terminated his contract with the club.

=== Radomiak Radom ===
On 24 February 2025, Dadaşov moved to Polish club Radomiak Radom on a contract until June 2025, with an option for extension. He scored twice in 12 league matches, with both goals coming in injury time of his first two appearances. Dadaşov left the club in June 2025 upon the expiration of his contract.

=== Motor Lublin ===
On 15 July 2025, Dadaşov signed a season-long deal with another Ekstraklasa club Motor Lublin, with an option for another 12 months.

== International career ==
Born in Germany to an Azerbaijani family from Azerbaijan, Dadaşov was eligible to play for both countries. He played for the Azerbaijani U16 team during the summer of 2014. He was later invited to the German U16 where he scored four goals in six games. On 9 September 2015, Dadaşov debuted for German U17 team and played 15 matches with 13 goals during the next year. He reached the semifinals of the 2016 UEFA European Under-17 Championship with the German team.

In early 2017, it was announced that Dadaşov would represent the Azerbaijan national team. He made his senior international debut on 5 September, against San Marino in 2018 FIFA World Cup qualification.

== Sponsorship ==
On 18 February 2020, Dadaşov signed a sponsorship deal with German sportswear and equipment supplier, Adidas.

== Career statistics ==
=== Club ===
As of match played 19 September 2026

Appearances and goals by club, season and competition
Club	Season	League			National cup (Note: Includes Taca de Portugal, Swiss Cup, Turkish Cup, Polish Cup, Ukrainian Cup)		League cup (Note: Includes Taca da Liga)		Total	
Club	Season	Division	Apps	Goals	Apps	Goals	Apps	Goals	Apps	Goals
Estoril	2018–19	LigaPro	22	4	1	0	4	0	27	4
Wolverhampton Wanderers	2019–20	Premier League	0	0	0	0	0	0	0	0
Wolverhampton Wanderers	2020–21	Premier League	0	0	0	0	0	0	0	0
Wolverhampton Wanderers	Total		0	0	0	0	0	0	0	0
Paços de Ferreira (loan)	2019–20	Primeira Liga	7	0	2	1	0	0	9	1
Grasshoppers (loan)	2020–21	Swiss Challenge League	0	0	0	0	—		0	0
Tondela (loan)	2021–22	Primeira Liga	30	2	7	1	—		37	3
Grasshoppers	2022–23	Swiss Super League	34	8	1	1	—		35	9
Grasshoppers	2023–24	Swiss Super League	4	1	1	0	—		5	1
Grasshoppers	Total		38	9	2	1	—		40	10
Hatayspor (loan)	2023–24	Süper Lig	31	6	2	0	—		33	6
Ankaragücü	2024–25	TFF 1. Lig	15	2	2	0	—		17	2
Radomiak Radom	2024–25	Ekstraklasa	12	2	—		—		12	2
Motor Lublin	2025–26	Ekstraklasa	21	0	1	0	—		22	0
Bukovyna Chernivtsi	2026–27	Ukrainian Premier League	2	0	1	0	—		3	0
Career total			178	25	18	3	4	0	200	28

=== International ===
As of match played 4 October 2026

Appearances and goals by national team and year
National team	Year	Apps	Goals
Azerbaijan	2017	1	0
Azerbaijan	2019	5	0
Azerbaijan	2020	1	0
Azerbaijan	2021	3	0
Azerbaijan	2022	9	1
Azerbaijan	2023	9	2
Azerbaijan	2024	6	1
Azerbaijan	2025	7	2
Azerbaijan	2026	7	1
Total		48	7

Scores and results list Azerbaijan's goal tally first, score column indicates score after each Dadaşov goal

List of international goals scored by Renat Dadaşov
No.	Date	Venue	Opponent	Score	Result	Competition
1	22 September 2022	Anton Malatinský Stadium, Trnava, Slovakia	Slovakia	1–0	2–1	2022–23 UEFA Nations League C
2	12 September 2023	Dalga Arena, Baku, Azerbaijan	Jordan	2–1	2–1	Friendly
3	16 November 2023	Tofiq Bahramov Republican Stadium, Baku, Azerbaijan	Sweden	2–0	3–0	UEFA Euro 2024 qualifying
4	5 September 2024	Tofiq Bahramov Republican Stadium, Baku, Azerbaijan	Sweden	1–3	1–3	2024–25 UEFA Nations League C
5	10 June 2025	Dalga Arena, Baku, Azerbaijan	Hungary	1–1	1–2	Friendly
6	16 November 2025	Tofiq Bahramov Republican Stadium, Baku, Azerbaijan	France	1–0	1–3	2026 FIFA World Cup qualification
7	9 June 2025	Haladás Sportkomplexum, Szombathely, Hungary	San Marino	2–1	2–1	Friendly

== Honours ==
Leipzig U17

- German U17 Bundesliga North/North-East: 2014–15

Germany U17

- Torneıo Internacıonal Algarve U17: 2016

Individual

- Swiss Super League Player of the Month: August 2022
