= 2016–17 Swiss 1. Liga =

Swiss 1. Liga
- Season: 2016–17
- Champions: Yverdon Sport FC; FC Luzern II; FC Gossau
- Promoted: Yverdon Sport FC; FC Stade Lausanne-Ouchy
- Relegated: FC La Sarraz-Eclépens; FC Wangen bei Olten; FC Muri; FC Seefeld Zürich; FC Locarno

The 2016–17 season of the Swiss 1. Liga was the 95th season of the fourth tier of the Swiss football league system.

== Tables ==
=== Group 1 ===
Pos	Team	Pld	W	D	L	GF	GA	GD	Pts	Promotion, qualification or relegation
1	Yverdon Sport FC (C, P)	26	19	5	2	64	27	+37	62	Qualification to Promotion play-offs
2	FC Stade Lausanne-Ouchy (P)	26	15	6	5	54	26	+28	51	Qualification to Promotion play-offs
3	Grand-Lancy FC	26	12	8	6	51	35	+16	44	Qualification to Promotion play-offs
4	FC Echallens	26	12	4	10	46	52	−6	40	
5	BSC Young Boys II	26	11	6	9	57	42	+15	39	
6	FC Martigny-Sports	26	9	6	11	48	57	−9	33	
7	FC Naters	26	8	8	10	40	41	−1	32	
8	FC Azzurri 90	26	8	7	11	38	45	−7	31	
9	Étoile Carouge FC	26	8	6	12	54	57	−3	30	
10	FC Vevey-Sports 05	26	7	8	11	34	46	−12	29	
11	Team Vaud U21	26	6	10	10	52	53	−1	28	
12	SC Düdingen	26	7	7	12	31	54	−23	28	
13	FC Fribourg (Note: FC Fribourg were reprieved from relegation following Le Mont's voluntary relegation from the Challenge League three steps to the 2. Liga Interregional)	26	7	6	13	39	54	−15	27	
14	FC La Sarraz-Eclépens (R)	26	7	5	14	37	56	−19	26	Relegation to 2. Liga Interregional

Rules for classification: 1) Points; 2) Goal Difference
(C) Champions; (P) Promoted; (R) Relegated

=== Group 2 ===
Pos	Team	Pld	W	D	L	GF	GA	GD	Pts	Promotion, qualification or relegation
1	FC Luzern II (C)	26	18	4	4	77	32	+45	58	Qualification to Promotion play-offs
2	FC Münsingen	26	14	7	5	43	31	+12	49	Qualification to Promotion play-offs
3	FC Solothurn	26	14	6	6	50	36	+14	48	Qualification to Promotion play-offs
4	FC Baden	26	14	5	7	53	42	+11	47	
5	SC Buochs	26	12	4	10	51	52	−1	40	
6	SR Delémont	26	11	6	9	47	45	+2	39	
7	FC Schötz	26	11	5	10	54	54	0	38	
8	FC Black Stars Basel	26	9	5	12	62	57	+5	32	
9	Zug 94	26	9	4	13	46	55	−9	31	
10	FC Thun II	26	9	3	14	38	51	−13	30	
11	FC Sursee	26	8	2	16	33	40	−7	26	
12	FC Bassecourt	26	6	8	12	44	60	−16	26	
13	FC Wangen bei Olten (R)	26	5	8	13	35	63	−28	23	Relegation to 2. Liga Interregional
14	FC Muri (R)	26	4	9	13	41	56	−15	21	Relegation to 2. Liga Interregional

Rules for classification: 1) Points; 2) Goal Difference
(C) Champions; (R) Relegated

=== Group 3 ===
Pos	Team	Pld	W	D	L	GF	GA	GD	Pts	Promotion, qualification or relegation
1	FC Gossau (C)	26	15	6	5	54	40	+14	51	Qualification to Promotion play-offs
2	Grasshopper Club Zürich II (Note: Grasshopper Club Zürich II could not be admitted to the Promotion play-offs because only a maximum of 4 reserve/under-21 teams are allowed in the Swiss Promotion League. As there were 3 already present, only one between FC Luzern II and Grasshopper Club Zürich II could be admitted. FC Luzern II were chosen due to their superior league finishing position.)	26	14	6	6	61	34	+27	48	
3	AC Bellinzona	26	14	6	6	63	37	+26	48	Qualification to Promotion play-offs
4	FC Wettswil-Bonstetten	26	13	3	10	39	39	0	42	
5	FC St. Gallen II	26	11	8	7	51	39	+12	41	
6	(Liechtenstein) USV Eschen/Mauren	26	12	4	10	40	35	+5	40	
7	FC Mendrisio-Stabio	26	10	9	7	40	36	+4	39	
8	FC Red Star Zürich	26	10	7	9	48	47	+1	37	
9	FC Winterthur II	26	10	3	13	42	45	−3	33	
10	FC Thalwil	26	9	6	11	43	49	−6	33	
11	(Liechtenstein) FC Balzers	26	9	3	14	41	46	−5	30	
12	FC Seuzach	26	8	3	15	34	60	−26	27	
13	FC Seefeld Zürich (Note: FC Seefeld Zürich took voluntary relegation to the 2. Liga Regional stating they wanted to restart with a competitive team) (R)	26	7	4	15	29	48	−19	25	Relegation to 2. Liga Regional
14	FC Locarno (R)	26	3	6	17	22	52	−30	15	Relegation to 2. Liga Interregional

Rules for classification: 1) Points; 2) Goal Difference
(C) Champions; (R) Relegated

== Promotion play-offs ==
Semi-Finals
FC Solothurn	2	1	3
Yverdon Sport FC	1	3	4
Grand-Lancy FC	0	1	1
FC Luzern II	0	0	0
FC Münsingen	1	0	1
FC Gossau	0	2	2
AC Bellinzona	5	0	5
FC Stade Lausanne-Ouchy	4	3	7

Finals
FC Gossau	2	0	2
Yverdon Sport FC	3	4	7
Grand-Lancy FC	2	1	3
FC Stade Lausanne-Ouchy	1	4	5

Yverdon Sport FC and FC Stade Lausanne-Ouchy were promoted to the 2017–18 Swiss Promotion League.
