= Dorian Babunski =

Macedonian footballer (born 1996)

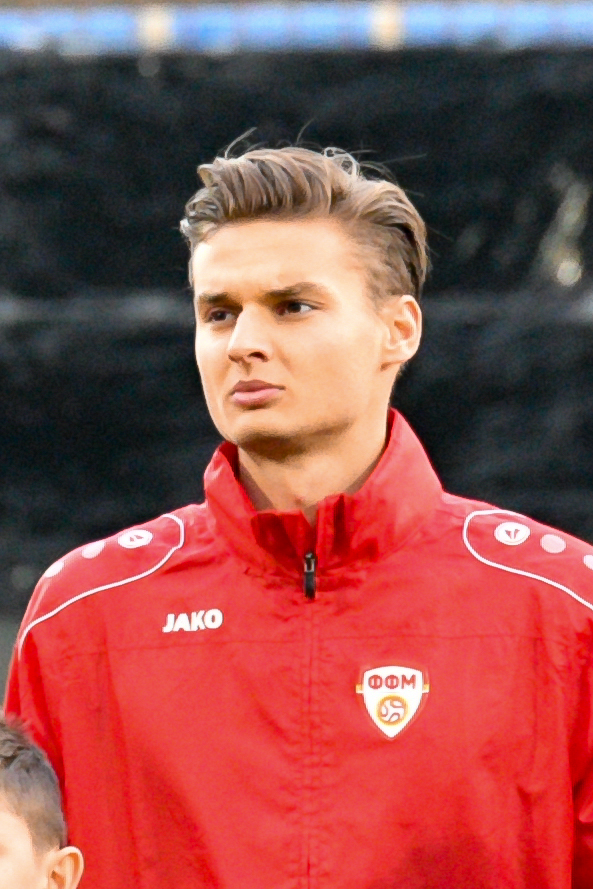
- Babunski playing for Macedonia U21 team

Personal information
- Full name: Dorian Babunski Hristovski
- Date of birth: 29 August 1996 (age 30)
- Place of birth: Skopje, Macedonia
- Height: 1.85 m (6 ft 1 in)
- Position: Forward

Team information
- Current team: Nyíregyháza Spartacus FC
- Number: 20

Youth career
- 2005–2006: Gramenet
- 2006–2011: Cornellà
- 2011–2015: Real Madrid

Senior career*
Years	Team	Apps	(Gls)
2015–2016	Fuenlabrada	13	(2)
2016–2017	Olimpija Ljubljana	1	(0)
2017	→ Radomlje (loan)	5	(0)
2017–2021	Machida Zelvia	55	(4)
2017	→ Kagoshima United (loan)	1	(0)
2021–2022	Botev Vratsa	34	(13)
2022–2023	Debrecen	48	(18)
2023–2025	Grasshoppers	32	(4)
2025	Sepsi OSK	13	(0)
2025–	Nyíregyháza	24	(2)

International career^{‡}
2011–2012	Macedonia U17	6	(0)
2013–2014	Macedonia U19	5	(3)
2013–2018	Macedonia U21	9	(0)
2022–	North Macedonia	7	(0)
- * Club domestic league appearances and goals as of 30 May 2026 ‡ National team caps and goals as of 19 June 2023

Dorian Babunski Hristovski (Macedonian: Дориан Бабунски Христовски; born 29 August 1996) is a Macedonian professional footballer who plays as a forward for Hungarian club Nyíregyháza Spartacus FC.

== Club career ==
Born in Skopje, Macedonia, Dorian joined Real Madrid's youth setup in 2011, after representing Gramenet and UE Cornellà. On 1 October 2015, he signed a free contract with Fuenlabrada, but was released in June 2016. Two months later, he signed a three-year contract with Olimpija Ljubljana.

In February 2017, he was signed by Radomlje on loan.

On 17 January 2022, he joined Debreceni VSC in the Nemzeti Bajnokság I, the top tier of Hungarian football, on a two-and-a-half-year deal. In his first season and a half, he made 48 league appearances and scored 18 goals.

On 28 August 2023, he signed a two-year contract with Swiss record champions Grasshopper Club Zürich, with an option to extend for a further year. He joins them for an undisclosed fee. On 7 January 2025, his contract was terminated by mutual consent.

On 4 July 2025, he signed a two-year contract with Hungarian club Nyíregyháza Spartacus FC. He joins them for an undisclosed fee.

== International career ==
Babunski was first called up to the Macedonian senior national team for their World Cup qualifier matches in November 2021, but did not see any playtime. On 2 June 2022, he finally made his senior debut for North Macedonia, in a Nations League match against Bulgaria, coming on in the 72nd minute of the game. In his second appearance for the national team, he assisted the second and final goal in a 0–2 away victory against Gibraltar.

== Personal life ==
Babunski's father, Boban, was also a footballer, and played in several countries, including Spain. His brother, David, is also a footballer. The two played together briefly at Debrecen in 2022.

== Career statistics ==
As of 18 May 2025

Appearances and goals by club, season and competition
Club	Season	League			National cup		Other		Total	
Club	Season	Division	Apps	Goals	Apps	Goals	Apps	Goals	Apps	Goals
Fuenlabrada	2015–16	Segunda División B	13	2	—		—		13	2
Olimpija Ljubljana	2016–17	Slovenian PrvaLiga	1	0	0	0	—		1	0
Radomlje (loan)	2016–17	Slovenian PrvaLiga	5	0	—		—		5	0
Kagoshima United (loan)	2017	J3 League	1	0	0	0	—		1	0
Machida Zelvia	2018	J2 League	24	4	1	0	—		25	4
Machida Zelvia	2019	J2 League	19	0	0	0	—		19	0
Machida Zelvia	2020	J2 League	12	0	0	0	—		12	0
Machida Zelvia	Total		55	4	1	0	0	0	56	4
Botev Vratsa	2020–21	First Professional Football League	16	3	2	0	1 (Note: Appearance in the 2020–21 First Professional Football League relegation play-offs)	0	19	3
Botev Vratsa	2021–22	First Professional Football League	18	10	0	0	—		18	10
Botev Vratsa	Total		34	13	2	0	1	0	37	13
Debrecen	2021–22	Nemzeti Bajnokság I	16	4	—		—		16	4
Debrecen	2022–23	Nemzeti Bajnokság I	30	13	3	0	—		33	13
Debrecen	2023–24	Nemzeti Bajnokság I	2	1	—		4 (Note: Apprarances in the UEFA Europa Conference League)	0	6	1
Debrecen	Total		48	18	3	0	4	0	55	18
Grasshopper	2023–24	Swiss Super League	30	4	1	0	—		31	4
Grasshopper	2024–25	Swiss Super League	2	0	1	1	—		3	1
Grasshopper	Total		32	4	2	1	0	0	34	5
Sepsi OSK	2024–25	Liga I	13	0	—		—		13	0
Nyíregyháza	2025–26	Nemzeti Bajnokság I	0	0	—		—		0	0
Career total			175	38	7	0	5	0	187	38

=== International ===
As of match played 17 June 2023

Appearances and goals by national team and year
National team	Year	Apps	Goals
North Macedonia
North Macedonia	2022	5	0
North Macedonia	2023	2	0
Total		7	0
