= 2023–24 Grasshopper Club Zurich season =

Grasshopper Club Zurich
2023–24 season
- Chairman: András Gurovits
- Manager: Marco Schällibaum
- Stadium: Letzigrund, Zürich, Switzerland
- Swiss Super League: 11th
- Swiss Cup: 2nd Round
- Top goalscorer: League: Tsiy-William Ndenge (8 goals); All: Tsiy-William Ndenge (8 goals)
- Highest home attendance: 19,326 vs Zürich (28 Jan '24)
- Lowest home attendance: 3,180 vs Lausanne (2 Dec '23)
- Average home league attendance: 6,967 ( +3%)
- Biggest win: 5–0 vs Lausanne (2 Dec '23)
- Biggest defeat: 0–3 vs Young Boys (4 Apr '24)
Home colours	Away colours

The 2023–24 Grasshopper Club Zurich season was the club's third season back in the Swiss Super League, after winning promotion in 2021. The season began on 22 July 2023. Grasshoppers also participated in the Swiss Cup.

As the team finished eleventh (second to last) in the league, they also participated in the relegation play-off, where they faced FC Thun of the Challenge League. The play-off consisted of a two legs, played on 26 and 31 May 2024, respectively.

== Squad ==
=== Players ===
As of 31 May 2024

No.	Name	Nationality	Pos	Date of birth (age)	at GCZ since	Apps	Goals	Former club
Goalkeepers
23	Nicolas Glaus	(Switzerland)	GK	10 May 2002 (age 24)	06/2023	0	0	Stuttgart II
29	Manuel Kuttin	(Austria)	GK	17 December 1993 (age 32)	06/2023	3	0	free agent
71	Justin Hammel	(Switzerland)	GK	2 December 2000 (age 25)	06/2022	50	0	Lausanne-Ouchy
90	Steven Deana	(Switzerland)	GK	4 March 1990 (age 36)	02/2024	1	0	Lugano
Defenders
2	Dirk Abels	(Netherlands)	RB	13 June 1997 (age 29)	07/2023	28	0	Sparta Rotterdam
3	Nigel Lonwijk	(Netherlands) (Suriname)	RB	27 October 2002 (age 23)	07/2023	1	0	Wolverhampton (on loan)
4	Kristers Tobers	(Latvia)	CB	13 December 2000 (age 25)	07/2023	32	0	Lechia Gdańsk
5	Joshua Laws	(Australia) (Scotland)	CB	26 February 1998 (age 28)	08/2023	23	0	Wellington Phoenix
12	Maksim Paskotši	(Estonia)	CB	19 January 2003 (age 23)	09/2023	29	0	Tottenham Hotspur
14	Théo Ndicka	(France) (Cameroon)	LB	20 April 2000 (age 26)	08/2023	30	1	Oostende
15	Ayumu Seko	(Japan)	CB	7 June 2000 (age 26)	01/2022	86	3	Cerezo Osaka
24	Michael Kempter	(Philippines) (Switzerland)	LB	12 January 1995 (age 31)	06/2023	6	0	St. Gallen
52	Samuel Marques	(Switzerland)	CB	4 February 2005 (age 21)	04/2024	0	0	own youth
54	Liam Bollati	(Switzerland)	RB	9 November 2003 (age 22)	11/2023	10	0	Kriens (on loan)
57	Elvir Zukaj	(Albania) (Switzerland)	CB	7 July 2002 (age 24)	07/2023	3	0	own youth
73	Florian Hoxha	(Kosovo) (Switzerland)	LB	22 February 2001 (age 25)	07/2021	29	1	own youth
Midfielders
6	Amir Abrashi	(Albania) (Switzerland)	CM	27 March 1990 (age 36)	06/2021	239	11	Basel
7	Tsiy-William Ndenge	(Germany) (Cameroon)	DM	13 June 1997 (age 29)	07/2022	62	12	Luzern
8	Giotto Morandi	(Switzerland)	PM	4 March 1999 (age 27)	06/2019	128	19	own youth
10	Meritan Shabani	(Germany) (Kosovo)	AM	15 March 1999 (age 27)	07/2022	34	3	Wolverhampton
11	Pascal Schürpf	(Switzerland)	AM	15 July 1989 (age 37)	06/2023	29	5	Luzern
17	Dion Kacuri	(Switzerland) (Kosovo)	AM	11 February 2004 (age 22)	10/2021	31	1	own youth
19	Dijon Kameri	(Austria)	AM	20 April 2004 (age 22)	02/2024	6	0	RB Salzburg (on loan)
19	Theo Corbeanu	(Canada) (Romania)	RW	17 May 2002 (age 24)	07/2023	18	1	Wolverhampton (on loan)
20	Noah Blasucci	(Switzerland) (Italy)	AM	19 June 1999 (age 27)	09/2022	3	1	Brühl
40	Robin Kalem	(Germany)	MF	14 July 2002 (age 24)	06/2020	24	1	own youth
53	Tim Meyer	(Switzerland)	CM	8 July 2004 (age 22)	07/2023	21	0	own youth
55	Damian Nigg	(Switzerland)	RW	12 April 2005 (age 21)	07/2023	4	0	own youth
70	Oliver Batista Meier	(Germany) (Brazil)	AM	16 February 2001 (age 25)	02/2024	8	0	Dynamo Dresden (on loan)
77	Filipe de Carvalho	(Switzerland) (Portugal)	LW	1 December 2003 (age 22)	01/2022	58	4	own youth
Forwards
9	Bradley Fink	(Switzerland) (England)	CF	17 April 2003 (age 23)	07/2023	34	4	Basel (on loan)
21	Awer Mabil	(Australia) (South Sudan)	LW	15 September 1995 (age 31)	08/2023	22	4	Cádiz
22	Francis Momoh	(Nigeria)	ST	25 March 2001 (age 25)	08/2021	78	12	Heartland
27	Asumah Abubakar	(Portugal) (Ghana)	CF	10 May 1997 (age 29)	01/2024	18	2	Luzern
27	Renat Dadashov	(Azerbaijan) (Germany)	CF	17 May 1999 (age 27)	07/2022	40	10	Wolverhampton
74	Elmin Rastoder	(Switzerland) (North Macedonia)	CF	7 October 2001 (age 24)	01/2022	11	0	own youth
99	Dorian Babunski	(North Macedonia) (Spain)	ST	29 August 1996 (age 30)	08/2023	31	4	Debrecen

Players in italic left the club during the season.

=== Players out on loan ===
Note: Flags indicate national team as defined under FIFA eligibility rules; some limited exceptions apply. Players may hold more than one non-FIFA nationality.

No.	Pos.	Nation	Player
27	FW	AZE	Renat Dadashov (at Hatayspor until 30 June 2024)
50	MF	SUI	Simone Stroscio (at Schaffhausen until 30 June 2024)
74	FW	SUI	Elmin Rastoder (at Vaduz until 30 June 2024)

=== Coaching staff ===
As of 10 April 2024

Position	Name	Since
Head coach	(Switzerland) Marco Schällibaum	04/2024
Assistant coach	(France) Aurélien Mioch	06/2023
Assistant coach	(Albania) Burim Kukeli	07/2023
Fitness coach	(Switzerland) Manuel Fässler	06/2023
Athletic coach	(Switzerland) Philippe Hasler	05/2021
Goalie Coach	(Switzerland) Jörg Stiel	06/2021
Video analyst	(Estonia) Rain Nappir	04/2021

== Transfers ==
=== In ===
Permanent signing Loan transfer

Date	No.	Pos	Player	Transferred from	Fee/notes	Ref.
19 June 2023	–	C	(Switzerland) Bruno Berner	(Switzerland) FC Winterthur	Unknown fee	
19 June 2023	–	AC	(France) Aurélien Mioch	(Switzerland) FC Winterthur		
30 June 2023	40	MF	(Germany) Robin Kalem	(Switzerland) Schaffhausen	Loan return	
30 June 2023	50	MF	(Switzerland) Simone Stroscio	(Switzerland) Schaffhausen	Loan return	
30 June 2023	74	FW	(Switzerland) Elmin Rastoder	(Liechtenstein) Vaduz	Loan return	
18 June 2023	24	DF	(Philippines) Michael Kempter	(Switzerland) St. Gallen	Free signing	
19 June 2023	29	GK	(Austria) Manuel Kuttin	Free Agent	Free signing	
19 June 2023	44	GK	(Switzerland) Nicolas Glaus	(Germany) VfB Stuttgart II	Free signing	
19 June 2023	11	MF	(Switzerland) Pascal Schürpf	(Switzerland) FC Luzern	Free signing	
19 June 2023	–	AC	(Albania) Burim Kukeli	(Switzerland) Grasshopper II		
3 July 2023	4	DF	(Latvia) Kristers Tobers	(Poland) Lechia Gdańsk	Free signing	
4 July 2023	19	FW	(Canada) Theo Corbeanu	(England) Wolverhampton	Loan	
4 July 2023	3	DF	(Netherlands) Nigel Lonwijk	(England) Wolverhampton	Loan	
17 July 2023	2	DF	(Netherlands) Dirk Abels	(Netherlands) Sparta Rotterdam	Free Signing	
20 July 2023	9	FW	(Switzerland) Bradley Fink	(Switzerland) FC Basel	Loan	
15 August 2023	5	DF	(Australia) Joshua Laws	(New Zealand) Wellington Phoenix	Free Signing	
21 August 2023	21	MF	(Australia) Awer Mabil	(Spain) Cádiz CF	Unknown fee	
28 August 2023	99	FW	(North Macedonia) Dorian Babunski	(Hungary) Debrecen	Undisclosed fee	
29 August 2023	14	DF	(France) Théo Ndicka	(Belgium) Oostende	Undisclosed fee	
6 September 2023	12	DF	(Estonia) Maksim Paskotši	(England) Tottenham Hotspur	Undisclosed fee	
29 January 2024	27	FW	(Portugal) Asumah Abubakar	(Switzerland) Luzern	Undisclosed fee	
2 February 2024	70	MF	(Germany) Oliver Batista Meier	(Germany) Dynamo Dresden	Loan	
8 February 2024	19	MF	(Austria) Dijon Kameri	(Austria) Red Bull Salzburg	Loan	
8 February 2024	90	GK	(Switzerland) Steven Deana	(Switzerland) Lugano	Free signing	
10 April 2024	–	C	(Switzerland) Marco Schällibaum	(Switzerland) Yverdon	Unknown fee	

=== Out ===
Permanent departure Loan transfer

Date	No.	Pos	Player	Transferred to	Fee/notes	Ref.
19 June 2023	–	C	(Switzerland) Giorgio Contini		Resignation	
19 June 2023	–	AC	(Switzerland) Romain Villiger		Termination	
30 June 2023	25	DF	(Guinea-Bissau) Nadjack	Free Agent	Contract Expiry	
30 June 2023	33	DF	(Austria) Georg Margreitter	Free Agent	Contract expiry	
30 June 2023	34	MF	(Japan) Teruki Hara	(Japan) Shimizu	Loan return	
30 June 2023	40	MF	(Japan) Hayao Kawabe	(England) Wolverhampton	Loan return	
30 June 2023	41	DF	(Switzerland) Noah Loosli	(Germany) VfL Bochum	Contract expiry	
30 June 2023	77	DF	(Hungary) Bendegúz Bolla	(England) Wolverhampton	Loan return	
30 June 2023	52	FW	(Switzerland) Malik Deme	(Switzerland) Young Boys	Contract Expiry	
30 June 2023	28	MF	(Slovakia) Christián Herc	(Slovakia) Dunajská Streda	Contract expiry	
30 June 2023	10	MF	(Switzerland) Petar Pušić	(Croatia) NK Osijek	Contract Expiry	
30 June 2023	9	FW	(Kosovo) Shkelqim Demhasaj	(Switzerland) FC Aarau	Contract Expiry	
30 June 2023	1	GK	(Portugal) André Moreira	(Saudi Arabia) Al Raed FC	Contract Expiry	
30 June 2023	95	FW	(Brazil) Guilherme Schettine	(Portugal) Braga	Loan return	
30 June 2023	51	MF	(Switzerland) Leonardo Uka	(Germany) FC Cosmos Koblenz	Contract Expiry	
30 June 2023	93	GK	(France) Lévi Ntumba	Free agent	Contract Expiry	
19 July 2023	50	MF	(Switzerland) Simone Stroscio	(Switzerland) Schaffhausen	Loan	
20 July 2023	31	DF	(Switzerland) Dominik Schmid	(Switzerland) FC Basel	Undisclosed Fee	
20 July 2023	14	DF	(Portugal) Tomás Ribeiro	(Portugal) Vitória S.C.	Undisclosed Fee	
5 September 2023	27	FW	(Azerbaijan) Renat Dadashov	(Turkey) Hatayspor	Loan	
16 November 2023	3	DF	(Netherlands) Nigel Lonwijk	(England) Wolverhampton	Loan return	
19 January 2024	19	FW	(Canada) Theo Corbeanu	(England) Wolverhampton	Loan return	
30 June 2023	74	FW	(Switzerland) Elmin Rastoder	(Liechtenstein) Vaduz	Loan	
7 February 2024	17	MF	(Switzerland) Dion Kacuri	(Switzerland) Basel	Undisclosed fee	
9 April 2024	–	C	(Switzerland) Bruno Berner		Termination	

== Absences ==
=== Injuries and other Absences ===
Past Ongoing

Start	End	No.	Pos	Player	Reason/Injury	#	Ref.
19 January 2023	30 June 2023	22	FW	(Nigeria) Francis Momoh	Knee surgery	0 (Note: Includes only games of the current season)	
29 April 2023	30 June 2023	77	FW	(Switzerland) Filipe de Carvalho	Partial ACL rupture	0	
23 June 2023	20 August 2023	11	MF	(Switzerland) Pascal Schürpf	Knee issues	4	
30 June 2023	20 July 2023 (Note: Date of departure from the club.)	14	DF	(Portugal) Tomás Ribeiro	Broken Nose	0	
15 July 2023	17 October 2023	3	DF	(Netherlands) Nigel Lonwijk	Torn muscle fiber	10	
28 July 2023	27 August 2023	10	MF	(Germany) Meritan Shabani	Adductor injury	4	
6 August 2023	2 September 2023	8	MF	(Switzerland) Giotto Morandi	Torn hamstring	3	
27 August 2023	30 June 2024 (Note: End of season)	24	DF	(Philippines) Michael Kempter	CL and meniscus injury	36	
12 September 2023	25 November 2023	53	MF	(Switzerland) Tim Meyer	Metatarsal bone fracture	8	
7 October 2023	30 June 2024	10	MF	(Germany) Meritan Shabani	Cruciate ligament injury	30	
22 October 2023	31 December 2023	2	DF	(Netherlands) Dirk Abels	Torn calf muscle and tendon injury	8	
5 November 2023	16 November 2023	3	DF	(Netherlands) Nigel Lonwijk	Torn hamstring	2	
5 November 2023	25 November 2023	19	MF	(Canada) Theo Corbeanu	Torn ankle ligament	1	
16 November 2023	31 December 2023	11	MF	(Switzerland) Pascal Schürpf	Torn hamstring	4	
16 November 2023	25 November 2023	5	DF	(Australia) Joshua Laws	Torn hamstring	0	
26 November 2023	31 December 2023	5	DF	(Australia) Joshua Laws	Unknown injury	3	
2 December 2023	31 December 2023	77	FW	(Switzerland) Filipe de Carvalho	Unknown injury	2	
8 December 2023	31 December 2023	74	FW	(North Macedonia) Elmin Rastoder	Unknown injury	2	
9 December 2023	5 April 2024	21	FW	(Australia) Awer Mabil	Thigh injury and surgery	13	
13 December 2023	15 May 2024	55	MF	(Switzerland) Damian Nigg	Unknown injury	12	
16 December 2023	31 December 2023	54	DF	(Switzerland) Liam Bollati	Unknown injury	1	
11 January 2024	23 February 2024	7	MF	(Germany) Tsiy-William Ndenge	Knee injury and surgery	6	
10 February 2024	27 March 2024	29	GK	(Switzerland) Manuel Kuttin	Broken finger	6	
23 February 2024	27 March 2024	2	DF	(Netherlands) Dirk Abels	Torn hamstring	3	
27 February 2024	27 March 2024	8	MF	(Switzerland) Giotto Morandi	Torn hamstring	3	
27 February 2024	16 March 2024	9	FW	(Switzerland) Bradley Fink	Torn hamstring	2	
31 March 2024	30 June 2024	19	MF	(Austria) Dijon Kameri	Lateral meniscus injury and surgery	13	
1 April 2024	4 May 2024	4	DF	(Latvia) Kristers Tobers	Hamstring injury	4	

=== Suspensions ===
Yellow card accumulation Yellow-red card suspension Direct red card suspension

Date	No.	Pos	Player	Note	#	Ref.
26 September 2023	6	MF	(Albania) Amir Abrashi	4th yellow card	1	
5 November 2023	4	DF	(Latvia) Kristers Tobers	4th yellow card	1	
31 January 2024	2	DF	(Netherlands) Dirk Abels	4th yellow card	1	
3 February 2024	22	FW	(Nigeria) Francis Momoh	4th yellow card	1	
10 February 2024	27	FW	(Portugal) Asumah Abubakar	Violent conduct	2 (Note: Original ban was reduced from three to two games, following appeal, on 22 February 2024.)	
17 February 2024	2	DF	(Netherlands) Dirk Abels	Yellow-red card	1	
17 February 2024	6	MF	(Albania) Amir Abrashi	8th yellow card	1	
17 February 2024	8	MF	(Switzerland) Giotto Morandi	4th yellow card	1	
9 March 2024	5	DF	(Australia) Joshua Laws	Yellow-red card	1	
7 April 2024	5	DF	(Australia) Joshua Laws	Denying a goalscoring opportunity	1	
4 May 2024	4	DF	(Latvia) Kristers Tobers	8th yellow card	1	
4 May 2024	9	FW	(Switzerland) Bradley Fink	Abusive language	3	
4 May 2024	53	MF	(Switzerland) Tim Meyer	4th yellow card	1	
10 May 2024	15	DF	(Japan) Ayumu Seko	4th yellow card	1	

== Test Games ==
Competition	First match	Last match	Record							
Competition	First match	Last match	Pld	W	D	L	GF	GA	GD	Win %
Pre-season	24 June 2023	18 July 2023	5	3	0	2	15	12	+3	60.00
Mid-season (Autumn)	2 August 2023	17 November 2023	4	4	0	0	10	1	+9	100.00
Winter break	7 January 2024	13 January 2024	3	1	2	0	6	1	+5	33.33
Mid-season (Spring)	27 February 2024	28 March 2024	3	2	0	1	8	4	+4	66.67
Total			15	10	2	3	39	18	+21	66.67

Last updated: 28 March 2024
Source: Testspiele

Win Draw Loss

=== Pre-season ===
On 30 May 2023, Grasshoppers announced their preparation plan for the pre-season. Preparation starts on 19 June and ends before the season begins on 22 July 2023. It will include a short training camp in Crans-Montana, Valais and four test matches. A fifth test-match against FC Wettswil-Bonstetten of the First League before the season begin was announced on 10 July 2023.

24 June 2023 Pre-season	Grasshopper Club Zurich	4–3	(Liechtenstein) FC Vaduz	Niederhasli, Switzerland
17:30 CEST (UTC+2)	Ndenge 19'; Shabani 38'; Kalem 49'; Morandi 53'	Report	17' Fehr; 21' Cavegn; 28' Cicek	Stadium: GC/Campus
Note: Originally scheduled for 14:00 CEST. Postponed due to the playoff final of the U16 squad.

30 June 2023 Pre-season	Grasshopper Club Zurich	2–1	Austria Lustenau	Niederhasli, Switzerland
16:30 CEST (UTC+2)	Momoh 36'; de Carvalho 87'	Report	50' Fridrikas	Stadium: GC/Campus
Note: Originally scheduled for 14:00 CEST.

7 July 2023 Pre-season	Stade Lausanne-Ouchy (Switzerland)	2–1	Grasshopper Club Zurich	Lausanne, Switzerland
15:00 CEST (UTC+2)	Pos 4'; Danho 42'	Report	Dadashov 78'	Stadium: Stade Olympique de la Pontaise

15 July 2023 Pre-season	SC Freiburg (Germany)	6–1	Grasshopper Club Zurich	Freiburg, Germany
16:00 CEST (UTC+2)	Röhl 34'; Höfler 37'; Knappe 53'; Breunig 66'; Lee 70'; Darvich 90'	Report	63' de Carvalho	Stadium: Europa-Park Stadion; Attendance: 9,500

18 July 2023 Pre-season	Grasshopper Club Zurich	9–0	(Switzerland) FC Wettswil-Bonstetten	Niederhasli, Switzerland
19:00 CEST (UTC+2)	Morandi 8', 22'; Abrashi 10' (pen.); Corbeanu 32', 38'; Rastoder 33'; Dadashov 66', 83'; Momoh 88'	Report		Stadium: GC/Campus

=== Mid-season (Autumn) ===
On 26 July 2023, the first mid-season test match against FC Rapperswil-Jona of the Swiss Promotion League was announced for 2 August 2023, between the second and third rounds of the season. Grasshoppers held test matches during all three international breaks of autumn 2023: YF Juventus of the 1st League on 19 September 2023 and Challenge League sides FC Schaffhausen and FC Wil on 18 October 2023 and 17 November 2023, respectively.

2 August 2023 Mid-season	Grasshopper Club Zurich	3–0	(Switzerland) FC Rapperswil-Jona	Niederhasli, Switzerland
16:30 CEST (UTC+2)[	Meyer 35'; Kalem 61'; Gasane 87'	Report		Stadium: GC/Campus

19 September 2023 Mid-season	Grasshopper Club Zurich	2–1	(Switzerland) YF Juventus	Niederhasli, Switzerland
19:00 CEST (UTC+2)	Momoh 69' (pen.), 90'	Report		Stadium: GC/Campus

18 October 2023 Mid-season	Grasshopper Club Zurich	4–0	(Switzerland) FC Schaffhausen	Niederhasli, Switzerland
15:00 CEST (UTC+2)	42' Babunski; 66' Bollati; 71' (pen.) Blasucci; 80' de Carvalho	Report		Stadium: GC/Campus

17 November 2023 Mid-season	FC Wil (Switzerland)	0–1	Grasshopper Club Zurich	Wil, Switzerland
12:00 CET (UTC+1)		Report	74' Kalem	Stadium: Lidl Arena
Note: Originally planned to be held at the GC/Campus in Niederhasli, the match was relocated to Wil due to the weather and pitch conditions on the GC/Campus.

=== Winter Break ===
The preparation schedule for the winter break was announced on 19 December 2023. Following the Christmas break, training will resume on 2 January 2024. During preparation, test games against four Swiss Challenge League teams were scheduled: FC Wil, Neuchâtel Xamax, FC Thun, and FC Baden.

7 January 2023 Winter Break	FC Wil (Switzerland)	0–5	Grasshopper Club Zurich	Wil, Switzerland
13:00 CET (UTC+1)		Report	47', 57' Fink; 64' Kacuri; 71' Momoh; 74' (pen.) Kalem	Stadium: Lidl Arena

10 January 2023 Winter Break	Neuchâtel Xamax (Switzerland)	1–1	Grasshopper Club Zurich	Neuchâtel, Switzerland
14:30 CET (UTC+1)	Rapp 70'	Report	89' de Carvalho	Stadium: Stade de la Maladière

13 January 2023 Winter Break	FC Thun (Switzerland)	0–0	Grasshopper Club Zurich	Thun, Switzerland
14:00 CET (UTC+1)		Report		Stadium: Stockhorn Arena
Note: Match length: 120 minutes (two halves + 30 minutes)

16 January 2023 Winter Break	FC Baden (Switzerland)	Abandoned	Grasshopper Club Zurich
Note: The match was abandoned due to poor pitch conditions.

=== Mid-season (Spring) ===
On 26 February 2024, a test game against FC Rapperswil-Jona was announced for the following day. Two further test games were scheduled during the international break in March.

27 February 2024 Mid-season	Grasshopper Club Zurich	2–0	(Switzerland) FC Rapperswil-Jona	Niederhasli, Switzerland
16:30 CET (UTC+1)	Ndenge 32'; Momoh 77' (pen.)			Stadium: GC/Campus

21 March 2024 Mid-season	Grasshopper Club Zurich	1–2	(Switzerland) FC Schaffhausen	Niederhasli, Switzerland
14:00 CET (UTC+1)	Momoh 83'	Report	5' Kamber; 84' Munsy	Stadium: GC/Campus

28 March 2024 Mid-season	Grasshopper Club Zurich	5–2	(Liechtenstein) FC Vaduz	Niederhasli, Switzerland
14:00 CET (UTC+1)	Abubakar 23'; Schürpf 39'; Abrashi 45'; Momoh 63', 65'	Report	2' Isik; 82' Väyrynen	Stadium: GC/Campus

== Competitions ==
=== Overview ===
Competition	First match	Last match	Starting round	Final position	Record							
Competition	First match	Last match	Starting round	Final position	Pld	W	D	L	GF	GA	GD	Win %
Super League	22 July 2023	21 May 2024	Matchday 1	11th	38	10	8	20	41	49	−8	26.32
Swiss Cup	20 August 2023	15 September 2023	Round 1	2nd round	2	1	0	1	4	3	+1	50.00
Relegation play-off	26 May 2024	31 May 2024	–	–	2	1	1	0	3	2	+1	50.00
Total					42	12	9	21	48	54	−6	28.57

Last updated: 31 May 2024
Source: Spielplan

=== Swiss Super League ===
==== League table ====
Pos	Team	Pld	W	D	L	GF	GA	GD	Pts	Qualification or relegation (Note: Teams played each other three times (33 matches), before the league was split into two groups (the top six and the bottom six).)
8	Basel	38	13	10	15	45	52	−7	49	
9	Yverdon-Sport	38	13	8	17	50	71	−21	47	
10	Lausanne-Sport	38	11	12	15	48	53	−5	45	
11	Grasshopper (O)	38	10	8	20	41	49	−8	38	Qualification for the Relegation play-off
12	Lausanne Ouchy (R)	38	7	8	23	40	77	−37	29	Relegation to Swiss Challenge League

Source: Swiss Super League
Rules for classification: 1) Points; 2) Goal difference; 3) Goals scored; 4) Head-to-head goal difference; 5) Head-to-head goals scored 6) Away goals scored; 7) Draw.
(O) Play-off winners; (R) Relegated

==== Results Breakdown ====
Home/Away Statistics

Overall								Home						Away					
Pld	W	D	L	GF	GA	GD	Pts	W	D	L	GF	GA	GD	W	D	L	GF	GA	GD
38	10	8	20	41	49	−8	38	8	3	8	28	21	+7	2	5	12	13	28	−15

Last updated: 21 May 2024.
Source: Spielplan

By Phase

Competition	First match	Last match	Starting round	Final position	Record							
Competition	First match	Last match	Starting round	Final position	Pld	W	D	L	GF	GA	GD	Win %
Regular Season	22 July 2023	20 April 2024	Matchday 1	11th	33	8	6	19	33	45	−12	24.24
Relegation Group	4 May 2024	21 May 2024	Matchday 34	11th	5	2	2	1	6	4	+2	40.00
Total					38	10	8	20	39	49	−10	26.32

Last updated: 21 May 2024
Source: Spielplan

By Month

Competition	First match	Last match	Starting round	Final position	Record							
Competition	First match	Last match	Starting round	Final position	Pld	W	D	L	GF	GA	GD	Win %
July	22 July 2023	29 July 2023	Matchday 1	9th	2	0	1	1	2	4	−2	0.00
August	6 August 2023	27 August 2023	Matchday 3	9th	3	1	0	2	4	5	−1	33.33
September	2 September 2023	30 September 2023	Matchday 6	11th	4	0	1	3	3	6	−3	0.00
October	7 October 2023	28 October 2023	Matchday 10	10th	3	2	0	1	6	4	+2	66.67
November	5 November 2023	26 November 2024	Matchday 13	10th	3	1	0	2	5	6	−1	33.33
December	2 December 2023	16 December 2023	Matchday 16	8th	3	2	1	0	7	1	+6	66.67
January	20 January 2024	31 January 2024	Matchday 19	8th	3	1	1	1	2	2	+0	33.33
February	3 February 2024	24 February 2024	Matchday 22	10th	4	1	0	3	2	4	−2	25.00
March	2 March 2024	16 March 2024	Matchday 26	11th	3	0	2	1	2	4	−2	0.00
April	1 April 2024	20 April 2024	Matchday 29	11th	5	0	0	5	2	9	−7	0.00
May	4 May 2024	21 May 2024	Matchday 34	11th	5	2	2	1	6	4	+2	40.00
Total					38	10	8	20	41	49	−8	26.32

Last updated: 21 May 2024
Source: Spielplan

Results by Round

#	1	2	3	4	5	6	7	8	9	10	11	12	13	14	15	16	17	18	19	20	21	22	23	24	25	26	27	28	29	30	31	32	33	34	35	36	37	38
Ground	H	A	H	A	H	A	H	Z	H	A	H	A	A	H	A	H	A	H	A	Z	A	H	Z	H	H	A	A	H	H	A	A	H	A	H	A	H	H	A
Result	L	D	W	L	L	L	D	L	L	W	W	L	L	W	L	W	W	D	L	W	D	L	L	W	L	D	L	D	L	L	L	L	L	W	D	W	L	D
Position	10	9	6	8	9	9	9	10	11	9	9	10	10	10	10	8	7	8	9	8	8	9	10	9	10	10	10	11	11	11	11	11	11	11	11	11	11	11
Points	0	1	4	4	4	4	5	5	5	8	11	11	11	14	14	17	20	21	21	24	25	25	25	28	28	29	29	30	30	30	30	30	30	33	34	37	37	38

Updated to match(es) played on 21 May 2024. Source: Spielplan
A = Away; H = Home; W = Win; D = Draw; L = Loss; Z = Zürich Derby

==== Results ====
As of 21 May 2024

Win Draw Loss

22 July 2023 1	Grasshopper	1–3	Servette	Letzigrund, Zürich
18:00 CEST (UTC+2)	Ndenge 23' (Corbeanu); Abrashi (yellow card) 85'	Report	16' (Severin), 61' (Kutesa) Bedia; (yellow card) 69' Rouiller; 77' (pen.) Crivelli	Attendance: 4,371; Referee: Luca Cibelli; Assistant referees: Lukas Fähndrich (VAR)

29 July 2023 2	Lausanne-Sport	1–1	Grasshopper	Stade de la Tuilière, Lausanne
18:00 CEST (UTC+2)	Ilie 43' (Sène); Dussenne (yellow card) 83'	Report	76' (Corbeanu) Morandi; (yellow card) 63' Kempter; (yellow card) 78' Momoh; (yellow card) 83' Tobers; (yellow card) 87' Seko	Attendance: 5,045; Referee: Alessandro Dudic; Assistant referees: Stefan Horisberger (VAR)

6 August 2023 3	Grasshopper	3–1	Basel	Letzigrund, Zürich
16:30 CEST (UTC+2)	de Carvalho 7' (Corbeanu); Morandi 16' (Abrashi); Dadashov 38' (Morandi)	Report	Comas	Attendance: 7,914; Referee: Luca Piccolo; Assistant referees: Fedayi San (VAR); Man of the Match: Giotto Morandi

12 August 2023 4	Winterthur	3–1	Grasshopper	Schützenwiese, Winterthur
18:00 CEST (UTC+2)	Di Giusto 18'; Sidler (yellow card) 47'; Turkes 62' (pen.); Schneider 84' (Ballet)	Report	7' (Ndenge) (yellow card) 41' Fink; (yellow card) 60' Abels; (yellow card) 63' Abrashi; (yellow card) 67' Nigg	Attendance: 8,400; Referee: Sandro Schärer; Assistant referees: Fedayi San (VAR)

27 August 2023 5	Grasshopper	0–1	Luzern	Letzigrund, Zürich
16:30 CEST (UTC+2)	Tobers (yellow card) 24'; Hoxha (yellow card) 83'; Abrashi (yellow card) 90'	Report	(yellow card) 24' Kadák; 84' (Frýdek) Chader	Attendance: 5,528; Referee: Nico Gianforte; Assistant referees: Sven Wolfensberger (VAR)

2 September 2023 6	Lausanne Ouchy	2–1	Grasshopper	Stade Olympique de la Pontaise, Lausanne
18:00 CEST (UTC+2)	62', 77' Danho	Report	21' (pen.) Corbeanu; (yellow card) 74' Morandi	Attendance: 1,852; Referee: Mirel Turkes; Assistant referees: Stefan Horisberger (VAR)

23 September 2023 7	Grasshopper	1–1	St. Gallen	Letzigrund, Zürich
20:30 CEST (UTC+2)	Ndenge 25' (yellow card) 34'; Abels (yellow card) 76'	Report	72' Fazliji	Attendance: 6,200; Referee: Stefan Horisberger; Assistant referees: Sven Wolfensberger

26 September 2023 8	Zürich	2–1	Grasshopper	Letzigrund, Zürich
20:30 CEST (UTC+2)	Krasniqi 37'; Marchesano 73'	Report	(yellow card) 23' de Carvalho; (yellow card) 27' Abrashi; (yellow card) 58' Tobers; (yellow card) 60' Corbeanu; (yellow card) 70' Ndicka; 90' (o.g.) Hodža	Attendance: 17,653; Referee: Fedayi San; Assistant referees: Sandro Schärer (VAR)

30 September 2023 9	Grasshopper	0–1	Young Boys	Letzigrund, Zürich
20:30 CEST (UTC+2)	Mabil (yellow card) 49'; Berner (yellow card) 61'	Report	17' Itten	Attendance: 5,708; Referee: Johannes von Mandach; Assistant referees: Fedayi San (VAR)

7 October 2023 10	Yverdon-Sport	0–3	Grasshopper	Stade Municipal, Yverdon-les-Bains
18:00 CEST (UTC+2)		Report	17', 68' (Schürpf) Mabil; (yellow card) 66' Ndenge; 72' (Mabil) Babunski	Attendance: 3,400; Referee: Alessandro Dudic; Assistant referees: Mirel Turkes (VAR); Man of the Match: Awer Mabil

22 October 2023 11	Grasshopper	2–1	Lugano	Letzigrund, Zürich
16:30 CEST (UTC+2)	Morandi (yellow card) 50'; Schürpf 71' (Corbeanu); Corbeanu (yellow card) 82'; Ndenge 90+3' (Corbeanu)	Report	83' Hajdari	Attendance: 6,102; Referee: Esther Staubli; Assistant referees: Johannes von Mandach (VAR)

28 October 2023 12	St. Gallen	3–1	Grasshopper	Kybunpark, St. Gallen
18:00 CEST (UTC+2)	Akolo 1'; Geubbels 35'; Zanotti 40'	Report	11' (Morandi) Ndenge	Attendance: 19,200; Referee: Sandro Schärer; Assistant referees: Johannes von Mandach (VAR)

5 November 2023 13	Luzern	2–0	Grasshopper	Swissporarena, Luzern
14:15 CET (UTC+1)	Okou 26'; Jashari 48'	Report	(yellow card) 37' Tobers; (yellow card) 45' Mabil	Attendance: 15,235; Referee: Luca Piccolo; Assistant referees: Sandro Schärer (VAR)

12 November 2023 14	Grasshopper	5–2	Lausanne Ouchy	Letzigrund, Zürich
14:15 CET (UTC+1)	Momoh 26' (de Carvalho), 28' (Hoxha), 51' (Mabil); Mabil 36' (Fink); Ndenge 44'	Report	3' Bamba; 75' Mulaj	Attendance: 4,022; Referee: Esther Staubli; Assistant referees: Stefan Horisberger (VAR); Man of the Match: Francis Momoh

26 November 2023 15	Servette	2–0	Grasshopper	Stade de Genève, Genève
16:30 CET (UTC+1)	Guillemenot 16'; Bedia (penalty missed) 68'; Cognat 75'	Report	(yellow card) 22' Laws; (yellow card) 68' Paskotši	Attendance: 7,124; Referee: Stefan Horisberger; Assistant referees: Nico Gianforte (VAR)

2 December 2023 16	Grasshopper	5–0	Lausanne-Sport	Letzigrund, Zürich
18:00 CET (UTC+1)	de Carvalho 46' (Fink), 50' (Abrashi); Ndenge 57' (Mabil); Mabil 65' (Abrashi); Tobers (yellow card) 80'; Ndicka 90+3' (Morandi)	Report	(penalty missed) 81' Sène	Attendance: 3,180; Referee: Nico Gianforte; Assistant referees: Sandro Schärer (VAR); Man of the Match: Felipe de Carvalho

9 December 2023 17	Basel	0–1	Grasshopper	St. Jakob-Park, Basel
18:00 CET (UTC+1)	Xhaka (red card) 18'	Report	(yellow card) 45+5' Hoxha; (yellow card) 47' Tobers; 72' (Momoh) Babunski	Attendance: 21,172; Referee: Luca Piccolo; Assistant referees: Sandro Schärer (VAR); Man of the Match: Justin Hammel

16 December 2023 18	Grasshopper	1–1	Yverdon-Sport	Letzigrund, Zürich
20:30 CET (UTC+1)	Ndenge 57' (Morandi); Tobers (yellow card) 68'; Meyer (yellow card) 71'	Report	58' Céspedes	Attendance: 4,056; Referee: Stefan Horisberger; Assistant referees: Urs Schnyder (VAR); Man of the Match: Amir Abrashi

Winter Break

20 January 2024 19	Young Boys	1–0	Grasshopper	Stadion Wankdorf, Bern
18:00 CET (UTC+1)	Rrudhani 73'	Report	(yellow card) 25' Morandi; (yellow card) 65' Hammel; (yellow card) 90+2' Seko	Attendance: 22,589; Referee: Urs Schnyder; Assistant referees: Johannes von Mandach (VAR)

28 January 2024 20	Grasshopper	2–1	Zürich	Letzigrund, Zürich
16:30 CET (UTC+1)	Abels (yellow card) 36'; Momoh (yellow card) 36'; Meyer (yellow card) 60'; Babunski 72' (Momoh); Schürpf 90+5'	Report	20' Krasniqi	Attendance: 19,326; Referee: Esther Staubli; Assistant referees: Stefan Horisberger (VAR)

31 January 2024 21	Lugano	0–0	Grasshopper	Stadio Cornaredo, Lugano
20:30 CET (UTC+1)		Report	(yellow card) 2' Momoh; (yellow card) 35' Abrashi; (yellow card) 64' Abels	Referee: Johannes von Mandach; Assistant referees: Mirel Turkes (VAR)

3 February 2024 22	Grasshopper	0–1	Winterthur	Letzigrund, Zürich
18:00 CET (UTC+1)	Bollati (yellow card) 56'; Momoh (yellow card) 74'; Abrashi (yellow card) 90'	Report	35' Ltaief	Attendance: 6,374; Referee: Luca Piccolo; Assistant referees: Johannes von Mandach

10 February 2024 23	Zürich	1–0	Grasshopper	Letzigrund, Zürich
18:00 CET (UTC+1)	Katic (red card) 26'; Marchesano 38' (pen.); Okita (yellow card) 90+3'	Report	(red card) 12' Abubakar; (yellow card) 37' Meyer	Attendance: 18,523; Referee: Stefan Horisberger; Assistant referees: Luca Cibelli (VAR)

17 February 2024 24	Grasshopper	2–1	Basel	Letzigrund, Zürich
20:30 CET (UTC+1)	Seko (yellow card) 23'; Momoh 29' (Morandi); Morandi (yellow card) 25' (goal) 36' (pen.); Abels (yellow card) 75' (yellow-red card) 77'; Abrashi (yellow card) 79'	Report	38' Schmid	Attendance: 7,025; Referee: Alessandro Dudic; Assistant referees: Mirel Turkes (VAR); Man of the Match: Giotto Morandi

24 February 2024 25	Grasshopper	0–1	Luzern	Letzigrund, Zürich
20:30 CET (UTC+1)	Kameri (yellow card) 72'; Bollati (yellow card) 75'; Batista Meier (yellow card) 81'; Laws (yellow card) 90+3'	Report	63' Jashari	Attendance: 5,535; Referee: Mirel Turkes; Assistant referees: Luca Cibelli (VAR)

2 March 2024 26	Lausanne Ouchy	1–1	Grasshopper	Stade Olympique de la Pontaise, Lausanne
18:00 CET (UTC+1)	Ajdini 32'	Report	10' (pen.) (yellow card) 72' Babunski	Attendance: 1,975; Referee: Luca Piccolo; Assistant referees: Nico Gianforte (VAR)

9 March 2024 27	Winterthur	2–0	Grasshopper	Schützenwiese, Winterthur
18:00 CET (UTC+1)	Burkart 73', 90+4' (pen.)	Report	(yellow card) 74' Abrashi; (yellow card) 88' (yellow-red card) 90+3' Laws	Attendance: 8,400; Referee: Luca Cibelli; Assistant referees: Luca Piccolo (VAR)

16 March 2024 28	Grasshopper	1–1	St. Gallen	Letzigrund, Zürich
18:00 CET (UTC+1)	Schürpf (yellow card) 26'; Hoxha (yellow card) 70'; Fink (yellow card) 76' (goal) 80' (Meyer); Paskotši (yellow card) 90+2'	Report	45+1' Akolo	Attendance: 10,092; Referee: Johannes von Mandach; Assistant referees: Lukas Fähndrich (VAR)

1 April 2024 29	Grasshopper	0–1	Lausanne-Sport	Letzigrund, Zürich
16:30 CEST (UTC+2)	Laws (yellow card) 52'	Report	15' Dabanli	Attendance: 13,400; Referee: Anojen Kanagasingam; Assistant referees: Stefan Horisberger (VAR)

4 April 2024 30	Young Boys	3–0	Grasshopper	Stadion Wankdorf, Bern
20:30 CEST (UTC+2)	Elia 6'; Ganvoula 18'; Monteiro 21'	Report		Attendance: 29,071; Referee: Fedayi San; Assistant referees: Lionel Tschudi (VAR)

7 April 2024 31	Yverdon-Sport	3–2	Grasshopper	Stade Municipal, Yverdon-les-Bains
16:30 CEST (UTC+2)	Kevin Carlos 9'; Alves 54'; Céspedes 59' (pen.)	Report	(red card) 22' Laws; 51' (Morandi), 62' (Abels) Schürpf	Attendance: 2,400; Referee: Nico Gianforte; Assistant referees: Luca Piccolo (VAR)

13 April 2024 32	Grasshopper	0–1	Lugano	Letzigrund, Zürich
18:00 CEST (UTC+2)	Morandi (yellow card) 64'; Paskotši (yellow card) 79'	Report	10' (pen.) Celar	Attendance: 5,449; Referee: Mirel Turkes; Assistant referees: Nico Gianforte (VAR)

20 April 2024 33	Servette	1–0	Grasshopper	Stade de Genève, Genève
18:00 CEST (UTC+2)	Stevanovic 2'	Report		Attendance: 7,582; Referee: Alessandro Dudic; Assistant referees: Johannes von Mandach (VAR)

Relegation Group

4 May 2024 34	Grasshopper	3–2	Lausanne Ouchy	Letzigrund, Zürich
18:00 CEST (UTC+2)	Fink (red card) 13'; Abubakar 44' (Morandi); Morandi 68' (pen.), 90' (de Carvalho); Tobers (yellow card) 74'; Tim Meyer (yellow card) 83'	Report	21' Pos; 62' (yellow card) 67' (yellow-red card) 87' Mahmoud	Attendance: 5,200; Referee: Nico Gianforte; Assistant referees: Sven Wolfensberger (VAR); Man of the Match: Giotto Morandi

10 May 2024 35	Luzern	1–1	Grasshopper	Swissporarena, Luzern
20:30 CEST (UTC+2)	Grbic 89'	Report	59' (yellow card) 65' Seko; (yellow card) 62' Abels	Attendance: 12,512; Referee: Luca Piccolo; Assistant referees: Mirel Turkes (VAR); Man of the Match: Giotto Morandi

14 May 2024 36	Grasshopper	2–0	Yverdon-Sport	Letzigrund, Zürich
20:30 CEST (UTC+2)	Momoh 40' (Mabil); Ndenge 89' (Babunski)	Report	(yellow card) 90+1' (yellow-red card) 90+1' Tijani	Attendance: 4,551; Referee: Alessandro Dudic; Assistant referees: Stefan Horisberger (VAR)

18 May 2024 37	Grasshopper	0–1	Basel	Letzigrund, Zürich
18:00 CEST (UTC+2)	Morandi (yellow card) 39'; Tobers (yellow card) 42'; Babunski (yellow card) 73'	Report	90+4' Frei	Attendance: 8,297; Referee: Mirel Turkes; Assistant referees: Sven Wolfensberger (VAR)

21 May 2024 38	Lausanne-Sport	0–0	Grasshopper	Stade de la Tuilière, Lausanne
20:30 CEST (UTC+2)		Report	(yellow card) 28' Bollati; (yellow card) 45+4' Babunski	Attendance: 5,078; Referee: Tobias Thies; Assistant referees: Alessandro Dudic (VAR)

=== Relegation Play-off ===
26 May 2024	Grasshopper Club Zurich	1–1	FC Thun	Letzigrund, Zürich
16:30 CEST (UTC+2)	Momoh (yellow card) 84'; Morandi 90+7' (pen.)	Report	Gutbub 52'	Attendance: 9,045; Referee: Sandro Schärer; Assistant referees: Fedayi San (VAR)

31 May 2024	FC Thun	1–2	Grasshopper Club Zurich	Stockhorn Arena, Thun
20:30 CEST (UTC+2)	Koné 43' (pen.) (red card) 90+4'	Report	3' (Abels) Morandi; (yellow card) 41' Ndenge; (yellow card) 52' Abels; 90+1' (Tobers) Abubakar; (yellow card) 90+5' Mabil	Attendance: 10,014; Referee: Urs Schnyder; Assistant referees: Lionel Tschudi (VAR); Man of the Match: Asumah Abubakar

Grasshopper Club Zurich wins 3–2 on aggregate.

=== Swiss Cup ===
As of 15 September 2023

Win Draw Loss

Opponent's league indicated in brackets.

20 August 2023 1st Round	SV Schaffhausen (Canton of Schaffhausen) (2Int)	0–4	Grasshopper Club Zurich	Berformance Arena, Schaffhausen
16:15 CEST (UTC+2)		Report	7' (Meyer) Hoxha; 19' (Momoh), 65' (Corbeanu) Fink; 88' (Abels) Schürpf	Attendance: 3,804

15 September 2023 2nd Round	FC Sion (Valais) (ChL)	3–0	Grasshopper Club Zurich	Stade Tourbillon, Sion
20:30 CEST (UTC+2)	Sorgić 45+1', 56'; Ziegler 90+8' (pen.)	Report		Attendance: 10,000; Referee: Urs Schnyder

== Awards ==
=== Fan Awards ===
Hopper of the Month
August: (Albania) Amir Abrashi
September: (Canada) Theo Corbeanu
October: (Germany) Tsiy-William Ndenge
November: (Nigeria) Francis Momoh
December: (Switzerland) Justin Hammel
January: (Switzerland) Justin Hammel
February: (Switzerland) Justin Hammel
March: (Switzerland) Justin Hammel
April: The Fans
May: (Switzerland) Giotto Morandi

Goal of the season

1. (Switzerland) Pascal Schürpf (2–1 vs FC Zürich on 28 January 2024)
2. (Switzerland) Pascal Schürpf (2–3 vs Yverdon-Sport FC on 7 April 2024)
3. (North Macedonia) Dorian Babunski (1–0 vs FC Basel on 9 December 2023)

Player of the season

1. (Switzerland) Justin Hammel
2. (Albania) Amir Abrashi
3. (Switzerland) Giotto Morandi

=== Official Awards ===
SFL-PLayer of the Round
Round 34: (Switzerland) Giotto Morandi

=== Other Awards ===
Team of the Season
Tages-Anzeiger: (Switzerland) Justin Hammel
