= Francis Momoh =

Nigerian footballer

Personal information
- Date of birth: 25 March 2001 (age 25)
- Place of birth: Kaduna, Nigeria
- Height: 1.87 m (6 ft 2 in)
- Position: Forward

Senior career*
Years	Team	Apps	(Gls)
2018	Heartland	12	(1)
2019–2024	Grasshoppers	73	(10)
2020–2021	Grasshoppers U21	20	(13)
2024–2025	LNZ Cherkasy	25	(2)
2025–2026	Winterthur	11	(0)
- * Club domestic league appearances and goals as of 18 September 2026

Francis Momoh (born 25 March 2001) is a Nigerian professional footballer who plays as a forward.

== Club career ==
=== Grasshopper Club Zürich ===
In August 2019, Momoh made the jump to Europe, where he was signed by Swiss club Grasshoppers, who play in the top Swiss league, the Swiss Super League. He gave his debut for the first team on 5 October 2019 in a 3–0 victory over FC Wil, where he was subbed on in the 79th minute.

For the 2020–21 season, he was transferred to the secondary squad, who play in the 1. Liga. He shot four goals in five games during this season. On 28 October 2021, Momoh extended his contract with Grasshoppers until 2024.

For the following season, he was recalled to the first squad, while still primarily playing for the reserve team. He has shot five goals in nine games for the reserve team in the that season. On 5 February 2022, he started for the main squad for the first time in a 1–3 defeat to city rivals FC Zürich. A week later, he was selected for the starting lineup again and managed to shoot his first two goals in the top Swiss league, in a 2–0 victory over Lausanne-Sport.

He spent a majority of the 2022–23 season sidelined due to issues in his right knee that required surgery early in 2023. He returned to the squad in the 2023–24 season, recovering just in time for the new season preparation. On 12 November 2023, he scored his first hat-trick for the senior squad in a 5–2 home victory against FC Stade Lausanne Ouchy.

=== LNZ Cherkasy ===
Grasshoppers announced his departure on 19 June 2024. On 17 August 2024, he signed with Ukrainian Premier League side FC LNZ Cherkasy. He departed the side after just one year, having terminated his contract by mutual consent on 3 September 2025.

=== Winterthur ===
On 24 September 2025, he officially joined Winterthur on a two-year deal. He had already signed for the struggling Swiss Super League side before the end of the transfer window on 9 September, but was still missing relevant permits. On 22 September 2026, Momoh's contract with Winterthur was mutually terminated.
