= Michael Kempter =

Filipino footballer (born 1995)

Personal information
- Full name: Michael Tribaco Kempter
- Date of birth: 12 January 1995 (age 31)
- Place of birth: Schlieren, Switzerland
- Height: 1.81 m (5 ft 11 in)
- Positions: Left-back; centre-back

Team information
- Current team: Muangthong United
- Number: 27

Youth career
- Rudolfstetten
- –2016: Zürich

Senior career*
Years	Team	Apps	(Gls)
2016–2020	Zürich	27	(1)
2020–2021	Neuchâtel Xamax	26	(0)
2021–2023	St. Gallen	22	(1)
2023–2025	Grasshopper	5	(0)
2024–2025	Grasshopper II	5	(0)
2025–	Muangthong United	19	(0)

International career^{‡}
2014	Switzerland U19	1	(0)
2014–2016	Switzerland U20	3	(0)
2021–	Philippines	12	(0)
- * Club domestic league appearances and goals as of 03:55, 4 November 2025 (UTC) ‡ National team caps and goals as of 15:10; 25 March 2025 (UTC)

Michael Tribaco Kempter (born 12 January 1995) is a professional footballer who plays as a left-back. Born in Switzerland, he plays for Thai League 2 club Muangthong United and the Philippines national team. He began his career at Zürich and had played for the Swiss youth national teams.

== Club career ==
=== FC Zürich ===
Kempter, a product of the FC Zürich youth academy, made his league debut for the club on 24 April 2016 in a 3–0 away defeat to Young Boys, coming on as an 81st-minute substitute for Vinícius Freitas. He scored his first competitive goal for the club on 10 April 2017 in a 5–2 away victory in the league over Le Mont. His goal, scored in the 54th minute, made the score 5–0 to Zürich.

In June 2017, Kempter suffered a rupture of the cruciate ligament. He was out until March 2018 and only one month later, he got injured again and had to get a surgery. On 1 February 2019, Kempter was relegated to the U-21 squad. In August 2020 his contract was not renewed.

=== Neuchâtel Xamax ===
In September 2020, Kempter signed a one-year deal with Swiss Challenge League club Neuchâtel Xamax.

=== St. Gallen ===
In July 2021, it was reported that Kempter was on trial with Swiss Super League club St. Gallen. Kempter played friendlies against Rheindorf Altach and Stuttgart. After a convincing pre-season, Kempter signed a two-year deal with St. Gallen.

=== Grasshopper ===
On 18 June 2023, Kempter joined Grasshopper on a free transfer. He signed a two-year deal with the Swiss giants. He started and played the full 90 minutes in the first four games of the season. On 27 August 2023, in his fifth start for Grasshoppers he had to be subbed off after a little over 60 minutes with an ACL and meniscus injury, which ended his season prematurely. By the time he returned to fitness in autumn 2024, he had been removed from the first team squad and only sporadically made appearances for Grasshoppers' under-21 side.

=== Muangthong United ===
He joined Muangthong United on 26 May 2025.

== International career ==
Kempter was born in Schlieren, Switzerland to a Swiss father and a Filipina mother from Pasay. As such, he was eligible to represent both Switzerland and Philippines.

=== Switzerland youth ===
Kempter has represented Switzerland at under-19 to under-20 levels.

=== Philippines ===
Kempter confirmed his decision to represent the Philippines in 2018, but did not receive his first call-up until June 2019 ahead of a friendly against China as the process to secure eligibility documents delayed the switch. He made his debut on 7 June 2021 in a 2022 FIFA World Cup qualification against China . In the 14th minute, his nose was elbowed in a controversial challenge from Tang Miao, and he had to be taken off the pitch. Tang was not booked for the incident, and a disappointed coach Scott Cooper confronted referee Kim Hee-gon at halftime, who allegedly claimed that Kempter "broke his own nose".

He captained his nation during their semi-final games against Thailand at the 2024 ASEAN Championship.

== Career statistics ==
=== Club ===
As of 27 May 2025

Appearances and goals by club, season and competition
Club	Season	League			Cup		Continental		Other		Total	
Club	Season	Division	Apps	Goals	Apps	Goals	Apps	Goals	Apps	Goals	Apps	Goals
FC Zürich	2015–16	Swiss Super League	2	0	—		0	0	—		2	0
FC Zürich	2016–17	Swiss Challenge League	12	1	1 (Note: Includes appearances in the Swiss Cup)	0	0	0	—		13	1
FC Zürich	2017–18	Swiss Super League	0	0	—		—		—		0	0
FC Zürich	2018–19	Swiss Super League	0	0	—		—		—		0	0
FC Zürich	2019–20	Swiss Super League	13	0	—		—		—		13	0
FC Zürich	Total		27	1	1	0	0	0	0	0	28	1
Neuchâtel Xamax	2020–21	Swiss Challenge League	26	0	—		—		—		26	0
St. Gallen	2021–22	Swiss Super League	12	1	0	0	—		—		12	1
St. Gallen	2022–23	Swiss Super League	10	0	1	0	—		—		11	0
St. Gallen	Total		22	1	1	0	0	0	0	0	23	1
Grasshopper	2023–24	Swiss Super League	5	0	1	0	—		—		6	0
Grasshopper	2025–25	Swiss Super League	0	0	0	0	—		—		0	0
Grasshopper II	2024–25	1. Liga	5	0	—		—		—		5	0
Career total			85	2	3	0	0	0	0	0	88	2
