= Joshua Laws =

Australian soccer player

Personal information
- Full name: Joshua Laws
- Date of birth: 26 February 1998 (age 28)
- Place of birth: Glasgow, Scotland
- Height: 1.83 m (6 ft 0 in)
- Position: Centre-back

Youth career
- Blackburn Rovers
- 2012–2016: Fortuna Düsseldorf

Senior career*
Years	Team	Apps	(Gls)
2016–2020	Fortuna Düsseldorf II	23	(0)
2020–2023	Wellington Phoenix	50	(0)
2023–2024	Grasshoppers	22	(0)
2024	Grasshoppers II	3	(0)
2025	Western Sydney Wanderers	1	(0)

International career^{‡}
2013	Scotland U15	3	(0)
2013–2014	Scotland U16	5	(1)
2015	Australia U17	4	(0)
2017–2020	Australia U23	5	(0)
Medal record
Men's football
Representing Australia
AFC U-23 Asian Cup
Third place	2020 Thailand	U-23 Team
- * Club domestic league appearances and goals as of 25 January 2026 ‡ National team caps and goals as of 2 January 2021

Joshua Laws (born 26 February 1998) is an Australian professional footballer who plays as a centre-back. He is currently a free agent.

== Early life ==
Laws was born in Scotland. He moved to Sydney, Australia aged four before returning to the United Kingdom at the age of twelve. When Laws was fourteen, he moved to Germany.

== Playing career ==
=== Club ===
==== Fortuna Düsseldorf ====
Laws began training with Fortuna Düsseldorf's first team in 2016, before suffering a broken arm and then another subsequent break in the same place. He would later suffer numerous ankle ligament injuries and a medial collateral ligament injury in his time at the club.

==== Wellington Phoenix ====
Laws signed for A-League side Wellington Phoenix in October 2020, reuniting with his former Australian youth team coach Ufuk Talay. He began the 2020–21 season as one of Wellington's first-choice centre backs, however, he suffered an ankle injury and subsequently lost his place in the starting side. Laws played fourteen games in his first season at the club.

In June 2021, Laws signed a two-year contract extension with Wellington. Laws was released by the Phoenix in May 2023 after three seasons at the club.

==== Grasshopper Club Zürich ====
On 15 August 2023, he signed with Swiss record champions Grasshopper Club Zürich, who play in the Swiss Super League. He joins on a two-year contract, with an option to extend for a further season. He was able to quickly establish himself in Grasshoppers' defense and became a regular starter for the majority of the season.

He missed the beginning of the 2024–25 season due to an injury that required him to get surgery. On 29 October 2024, he departed the club by mutual consent. Outside of three games for the reserves, he played no minutes in his truncated second season with Grasshoppers.

==== Western Sydney Wanderers ====
On 10 February 2025, Laws signed for Western Sydney Wanderers Sydney Wanderers until the end of the season.

=== International ===
==== Scotland ====
Laws initially played international youth football for Scotland's under-15 and under-16 national teams. This included participating in the 2014 Aegean Cup, where he played against Norway.

In total, Laws played three times for Scotland's under 15 side and five times for the under-16 team, scoring one goal, across 2013 and 2014.

==== Australia ====
Laws subsequently elected to represent Australia and was selected in Australia's under-17 squad for the 2015 FIFA U-17 World Cup in Chile. Laws played as a central defender in all four of Australia's games at the tournament as they were eliminated in the Round of 16.

Laws was selected in the Australian under-23 side for the 2020 AFC U-23 Championship and played in the group stage game against Thailand.

== Style of play ==
Laws is left footed, and able to play in central midfield, central defence and left back.

== Career statistics ==
=== Club ===
As of 29 October 2024

Appearances and goals by club, season and competition
Club	Season	League			National cup (Note: Includes Australia Cup)		Other		Total	
Club	Season	Division	Apps	Goals	Apps	Goals	Apps	Goals	Apps	Goals
Fortuna Düsseldorf II	2016–17	Regionalliga West	0	0	—		—		0	0
Fortuna Düsseldorf II	2017–18	Regionalliga West	6	0	—		—		6	0
Fortuna Düsseldorf II	2018–19	Regionalliga West	8	0	—		—		8	0
Fortuna Düsseldorf II	2019–20	Regionalliga West	9	0	—		—		9	0
Fortuna Düsseldorf II	Total		23	0	0	0	0	0	23	0
Wellington Phoenix	2020–21	A-League	14	0	—		—		14	0
Wellington Phoenix	2021–22	A-League Men	15	0	3	0	—		18	3
Wellington Phoenix	2022–23	A-League Men	21	0	3	0	—		24	0
Wellington Phoenix	Total		50	0	6	0	0	0	56	0
Grasshopper	2023–24	Swiss Super League	22	0	1	0	0	0	23	0
Grasshopper	2024–25	Swiss Super League	0	0	0	0	—		0	0
Grasshopper II	2024–25	1. Liga	3	0	—		—		3	0
Western Sydney Wanderers	2024–25	A-League Men	1	0	—		—		1	0
Career total			99	0	7	0	0	0	106	0

== Honours ==
Australia U-23

- AFC U-23 Asian Cup: 3rd place 2020

== See also ==
- List of sportspeople who competed for more than one nation
- List of Wellington Phoenix FC players
