= Dijon Kameri =

Austrian footballer

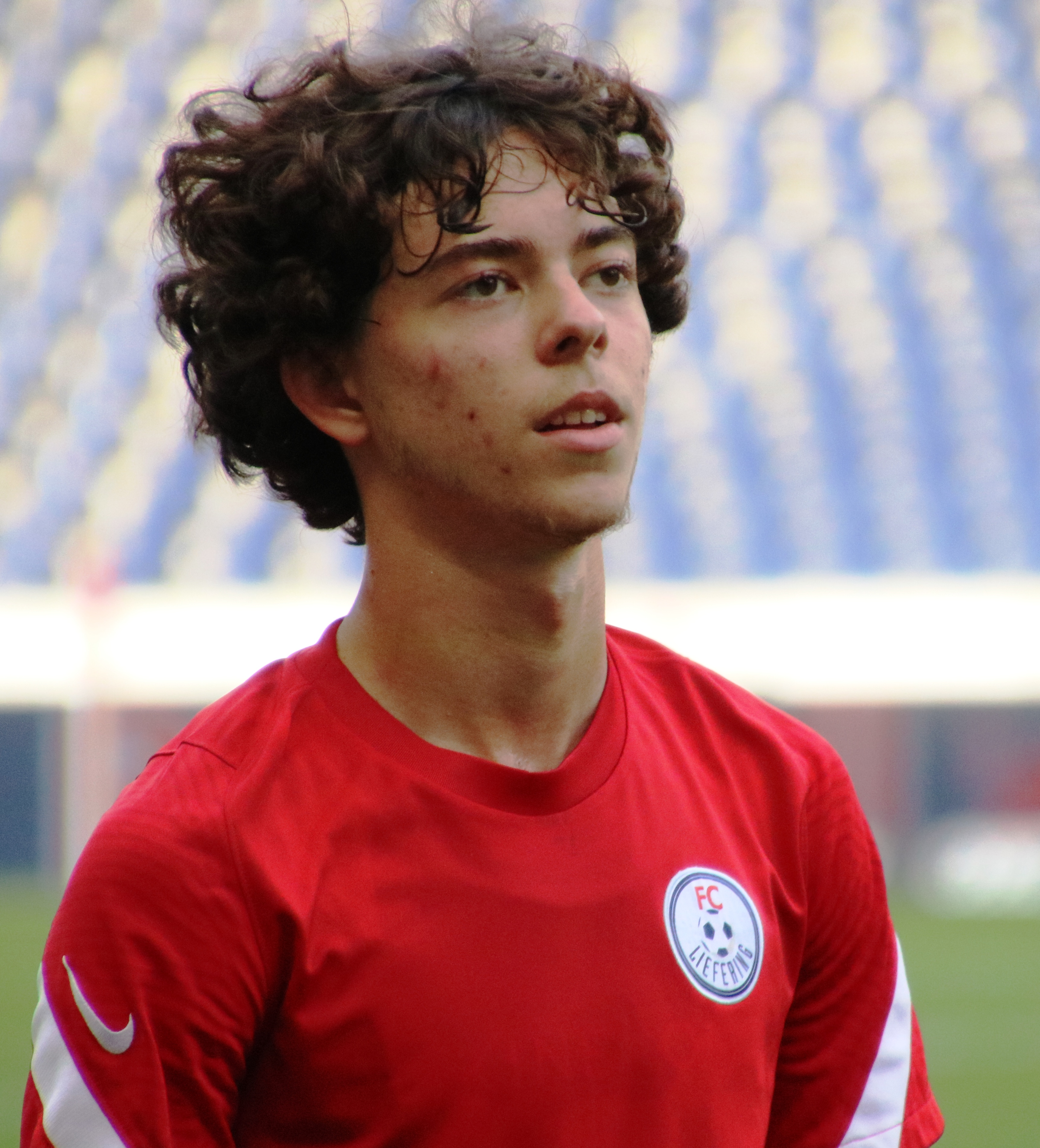
- Kameri with Liefering in 2021

Personal information
- Date of birth: 20 April 2004 (age 22)
- Place of birth: Salzburg, Austria
- Height: 1.81 m (5 ft 11 in)
- Position: Midfielder

Team information
- Current team: Cracovia
- Number: 70

Youth career
- 2012–2016: FC Liefering
- 2016–2017: Red Bull Salzburg
- 2017–2018: FC Liefering
- 2018–2021: Red Bull Salzburg

Senior career*
| Years | Team | Apps | (Gls) |
| 2021–2022 | FC Liefering | 30 | (3) |
| 2022–2025 | Red Bull Salzburg | 18 | (1) |
| 2024 | → Grasshopper Club Zurich (loan) | 6 | (0) |
| 2024–2025 | → Rheindorf Altach (loan) | 24 | (2) |
| 2025– | Cracovia | 22 | (2) |

International career^{‡}
| 2018–2019 | Austria U15 | 10 | (4) |
| 2019–2020 | Austria U16 | 9 | (1) |
| 2020 | Austria U17 | 1 | (0) |
| 2021–2022 | Austria U18 | 5 | (2) |
| 2023– | Austria U21 | 11 | (2) |
- * Club domestic league appearances and goals as of 16:42, 29 May 2026 (UTC) ‡ National team caps and goals as of 23:32, 27 March 2026 (UTC)

Dijon Kameri (born 20 April 2004) is an Austrian professional footballer who plays as a midfielder for Ekstraklasa club Cracovia.

== Club career ==
Kameri began his career at FC Liefering. Between 2016 and 2017 he played for the youth of the partner club Red Bull Salzburg for a short time before moving to the Red Bull Salzburg academy for the 2018–19 season. After three years at the academy, he moved to the professional squad of the farm team FC Liefering for the 2021–22 season.

His debut for Liefering in the 2. Liga he gave in July 2021, when he was in the starting line-up on the first day of that season against Kapfenberger SV.

On 8 February 2024, he joined Swiss Super League side Grasshopper Club Zurich on loan for the remainder of the season. After just six appearances, of which he started in two, he suffered an injury to his outer meniscus that would require surgery and ruled him out for the rest of the season. On 19 June 2024, his return to Salzburg was announced.

On 21 August 2024, Kameri joined Rheindorf Altach, on a season-long loan.

On 21 July 2025, Kameri signed a three-year deal with Polish top-flight club Cracovia.

== International career ==
Kameri first represented an Austrian youth national team in October 2018. In October 2020, he made his debut for the Austria under-17 team against Slovenia. In September 2021, he made his debut for the Austria under-18 team against the Czech Republic. In March 2023, he earned his first cap for the Austria under-21s against Poland.

== Career statistics ==
As of match played 16 May 2026

Appearances and goals by club, season and competition
| Club | Season | League | | | National cup (Note: Includes Austrian Cup, Polish Cup) | | Continental | | Other | | Total | |
| Club | Season | Division | Apps | Goals | Apps | Goals | Apps | Goals | Apps | Goals | Apps | Goals |
|---|---|---|---|---|---|---|---|---|---|---|---|---|
| FC Liefering | 2021–22 | 2. Liga | 22 | 1 | — | | — | | — | | 22 | 1 |
| FC Liefering | 2022–23 | 2. Liga | 8 | 2 | — | | — | | — | | 8 | 2 |
| FC Liefering | Total | | 30 | 3 | — | | — | | — | | 30 | 3 |
| Red Bull Salzburg | 2022–23 | Austrian Bundesliga | 12 | 1 | 1 | 1 | 4 (Note: Appearances in UEFA Champions League) | 0 | — | | 17 | 2 |
| Red Bull Salzburg | 2023–24 | Austrian Bundesliga | 6 | 0 | 1 | 1 | 1 | 0 | — | | 8 | 1 |
| Red Bull Salzburg | Total | | 18 | 1 | 2 | 2 | 5 | 0 | 0 | 0 | 25 | 3 |
| Grasshopper Club Zurich (loan) | 2023–24 | Swiss Super League | 6 | 0 | — | | — | | — | | 6 | 0 |
| Rheindorf Altach (loan) | 2024–25 | Austrian Bundesliga | 24 | 2 | 0 | 0 | — | | — | | 24 | 2 |
| Cracovia | 2025–26 | Ekstraklasa | 22 | 2 | 1 | 0 | — | | — | | 23 | 2 |
| Career total | | | 100 | 8 | 3 | 2 | 5 | 0 | 0 | 0 | 108 | 10 |

== Honours ==
Red Bull Salzburg

- Austrian Bundesliga: 2022–23
