= Justin Hammel =

Swiss footballer (born 2000)

Personal information
- Full name: Justin Pete Hammel
- Date of birth: 2 December 2000 (age 25)
- Place of birth: Basel, Switzerland
- Height: 1.85 m (6 ft 1 in)
- Position: Goalkeeper

Team information
- Current team: Grasshoppers
- Number: 71

Youth career
- 2016–2017: Old Boys
- 2017–2020: Basel

Senior career*
Years	Team	Apps	(Gls)
2017–2020	Basel II	3	(0)
2020–2022	Lausanne-Ouchy	50	(0)
2022–	Grasshoppers	123	(0)

International career^{‡}
2021-	Switzerland U21	3	(0)
- * Club domestic league appearances and goals as of 28 September 2026 ‡ National team caps and goals as of 15:10, 15 June 2022 (UTC)

Justin Pete Hammel (born 2 December 2000) is a Swiss professional footballer who plays as a goalkeeper for Swiss club Grasshopper Club Zürich.

== Career ==
=== Lausanne-Ouchy ===
A product of FC Basel's academy, he joined Stade Lausanne-Ouchy in the Swiss Challenge League for the 2020–21 season as third goalkeeper. He quickly rose to the position of being Lausanne-Ouchy's first choice between the posts and was capped 21 times in his first season in the Swiss Challenge League. In the following season, he wrote history to become the only goalkeeper of the Swiss Football League to provide two assists in one game, in a 5:0 home victory over SC Kriens. He played a total 29 matches for Lausanne-Ouchy that season and held nine clean sheets.

=== Grasshopper Club Zürich ===
On 15 June 2022 he signed for Grasshopper Club Zürich in the Swiss Super League, as second goalkeeper behind Portuguese goalkeeper André Moreira. He made his first appearance for Grasshopper in the first round of the Swiss Cup on 20 August 2022 against FC Wettswil-Bonstetten in a 4–0 away win.

Following Moreira's injury in an away match against his boyhood club FC Basel, he made his league debut after coming on in the 25th minute of the game. His debut would not be very successful, as the team lost the match 1–5 and he directly caused Basel's third goal when he collided with his own defender in an attempt to clear a high ball. As Moreira's injury was serious, he continued to make league appearances for the remainder of the year, playing a further eight league games and managing one clean sheet, a 1–0 home win against Basel.

After Moreira's departure from the club at the end of the 2022–23 season, he was promoted to the team's first goalkeeper. He quickly established himself as one of the best goalkeepers in the league and the fans voted him the best player of the months of December 2023, January, February, and March 2024. He was finally also voted as their player of the season. On 21 December 2024, during his second season as first choice goalkeeper, his contract was renewed for a further two years until the summer of 2027.

On 17 December 2025, he made his 100th appearance in the Swiss Super League, the national top flight, and his 111th appearance for Grasshoppers.

== International career ==
Hammel made his debut for the Switzerland U21 team in the 2023 Euro U21 qualifier against Gibraltar U21 and held a clean sheet in the 4–0 victory. He has since played two more games for the Switzerland U21, another 4–0 win against Gibraltar and a 0–1 away victory against Wales, and as such has not yet conceded a goal in international games.
