= 2017 Kagoshima United FC season =

Kagoshima United FC
2017 season
- Manager: Yasutoshi Miura
- Stadium: Kagoshima Kamoike Stadium
- J3 League: 4th

2017 Kagoshima United FC season.

== J3 League ==
=== League table ===
Pos	Team	Pld	W	D	L	GF	GA	GD	Pts	Promotion
1	Blaublitz Akita (C)	32	18	7	7	53	31	+22	61	Ineligible for promotion to 2018 J2 League
2	Tochigi SC (P)	32	16	12	4	44	24	+20	60	Promotion to 2018 J2 League (Note: Only teams that hold a J2 license are eligible for promotion.)
3	Azul Claro Numazu	32	16	11	5	60	27	+33	59	
4	Kagoshima United	32	17	4	11	49	37	+12	55	
5	Nagano Parceiro	32	13	11	8	34	25	+9	50	
6	FC Ryukyu	32	13	11	8	44	36	+8	50	
7	Fujieda MYFC	32	12	11	9	50	43	+7	47	

Source: 2017 MEIJI YASUDA J3 LEAGUE League table
Rules for classification: 1) Points; 2) Goal difference; 3) Goals scored; 4th) head-to-head results; 5th) disciplinary points; 6th) draw
(C) Champions; (P) Promoted

=== Match details ===
J3 League match details
Match	Date	Team	Score	Team	Venue	Attendance
1	2017.03.11	Kagoshima United FC	5-0	Fujieda MYFC	Kagoshima Kamoike Stadium	5,039
2	2017.03.18	Kataller Toyama	1-0	Kagoshima United FC	Toyama Stadium	3,698
3	2017.03.25	Kagoshima United FC	1-0	Gamba Osaka U-23	Kagoshima Kamoike Stadium	2,219
4	2017.04.02	FC Tokyo U-23	1-2	Kagoshima United FC	Yumenoshima Stadium	1,876
5	2017.04.16	Kagoshima United FC	2-1	Giravanz Kitakyushu	Kagoshima Kamoike Stadium	5,157
6	2017.04.30	Azul Claro Numazu	2-0	Kagoshima United FC	Ashitaka Park Stadium	2,813
7	2017.05.06	Kagoshima United FC	0-1	Cerezo Osaka U-23	Kagoshima Kamoike Stadium	4,918
8	2017.05.13	AC Nagano Parceiro	2-1	Kagoshima United FC	Minami Nagano Sports Park Stadium	2,652
10	2017.05.28	Blaublitz Akita	1-0	Kagoshima United FC	Akita Yabase Athletic Field	3,491
11	2017.06.04	Kagoshima United FC	2-1	Gainare Tottori	Kagoshima Kamoike Stadium	4,311
12	2017.06.10	Kagoshima United FC	2-1	Fukushima United FC	Kagoshima Kamoike Stadium	2,949
13	2017.06.17	Tochigi SC	2-1	Kagoshima United FC	Tochigi Green Stadium	5,041
14	2017.06.25	Kagoshima United FC	1-0	YSCC Yokohama	Kagoshima Kamoike Stadium	1,854
15	2017.07.02	Grulla Morioka	0-0	Kagoshima United FC	Iwagin Stadium	1,335
16	2017.07.08	Kagoshima United FC	0-1	FC Ryukyu	Kagoshima Kamoike Stadium	3,024
17	2017.07.16	SC Sagamihara	1-3	Kagoshima United FC	Sagamihara Gion Stadium	3,127
18	2017.07.23	Cerezo Osaka U-23	1-3	Kagoshima United FC	Yanmar Stadium Nagai	745
19	2017.08.19	Kagoshima United FC	2-1	AC Nagano Parceiro	Kagoshima Kamoike Stadium	2,318
20	2017.08.26	Kagoshima United FC	2-1	Kataller Toyama	Kagoshima Kamoike Stadium	2,413
21	2017.09.02	Fujieda MYFC	1-1	Kagoshima United FC	Fujieda Soccer Stadium	1,465
22	2017.09.09	Kagoshima United FC	1-5	Tochigi SC	Kagoshima Kamoike Stadium	3,818
23	2017.09.16	FC Ryukyu	0-1	Kagoshima United FC	Okinawa Athletic Park Stadium	1,083
25	2017.09.30	Kagoshima United FC	1-1	Blaublitz Akita	Kagoshima Kamoike Stadium	4,419
26	2017.10.08	Gainare Tottori	1-2	Kagoshima United FC	Tottori Bank Bird Stadium	1,116
27	2017.10.15	Giravanz Kitakyushu	0-4	Kagoshima United FC	Mikuni World Stadium Kitakyushu	4,270
28	2017.10.21	Kagoshima United FC	1-2	Azul Claro Numazu	Kagoshima Kamoike Stadium	2,798
29	2017.10.28	YSCC Yokohama	4-1	Kagoshima United FC	NHK Spring Mitsuzawa Football Stadium	687
30	2017.11.05	Kagoshima United FC	1-0	Grulla Morioka	Kagoshima Kamoike Stadium	3,615
31	2017.11.11	Fukushima United FC	3-1	Kagoshima United FC	Toho Stadium	642
32	2017.11.19	Gamba Osaka U-23	0-0	Kagoshima United FC	Suita City Football Stadium	1,257
33	2017.11.26	Kagoshima United FC	3-0	FC Tokyo U-23	Kagoshima Kamoike Stadium	2,882
34	2017.12.03	Kagoshima United FC	5-2	SC Sagamihara	Kagoshima Kamoike Stadium	4,394
