= Giotto Morandi =

Swiss footballer (born 1999)

Personal information
- Full name: Giotto Giuseppe Morandi
- Date of birth: 4 March 1999 (age 27)
- Place of birth: Locarno, Switzerland
- Height: 1.81 m (5 ft 11 1/2 in)
- Position: Midfielder

Team information
- Current team: Grasshopper Club Zürich
- Number: 11

Youth career
- 2006–2012: Ascona
- 2012–2014: Bellinzona
- 2014–2016: Lugano
- 2016–2017: Grasshopper

Senior career*
| Years | Team | Apps | (Gls) |
| 2017–2018 | Grasshopper U21 | 23 | (4) |
| 2018–2025 | Grasshopper | 157 | (25) |
| 2019 | → Schaffhausen (loan) | 5 | (0) |
| 2025–2026 | Servette | 16 | (0) |
| 2026– | Grasshopper | 5 | (1) |

International career^{‡}
| 2016-2017 | Switzerland U17 | 8 | (0) |
- * Club domestic league appearances and goals as of 28 September 2026 ‡ National team caps and goals as of 7 April 2022

Giotto Giuseppe Morandi (born 4 March 1999) is a Swiss professional footballer who plays as a midfielder for Grasshopper Club Zürich in the Swiss Super League.

== Professional career ==
Morandi is a youth product of Ascona, Bellinzona, Lugano and Grasshopper. He made his professional debut for Grasshopper in a 4-0 Swiss Super League loss to FC Basel on 3 February 2019. He signed on loan with Schaffhausen in the second half of the 2019–20 season. He renewed his contract with Grasshopper on 12 February 2020.

In February 2021, he suffered an injury to his cruciate ligament and was out of action for the remainder of the season. In October 2021, he returned to the squad and by March 2022, he played his first minutes in the first team since his injury. On 2 April 2022, he was in the starting lineup in the derby against FC Zürich, where he also shot the only goal for Grasshoppers in the 1–1 draw, his first ever goal in the highest Swiss league. He quickly established himself as a mainstay in the first team's lineup for the remainder of the season. On 17 June 2022, he renewed his contract at Grasshoppers until summer 2025 before the start of the new season.

On 26 September 2023, he gave his 100th appearance for Grasshoppers, in the 1–2 defeat to FC Zürich in the Zürich Derby.

On 3 June 2025, he joined Swiss Super League rivals Servette on a free transfer after nine years in Zurich. He signed a three-year deal with Servette.

On 15 August 2026, he returned to GC Zurich.

== Personal life ==
Morandi's father, Davide, is a former footballer and coach in Switzerland. Morandi promised him his jersey after shooting his first Super League goal.
