= 2018 FC Machida Zelvia season =

FC Machida Zelvia
2018 season
- Manager: Naoki Soma
- Stadium: Machida Stadium
- J2 League: 4th
Home colours	Away colours

2018 FC Machida Zelvia season.

== J2 League ==
Match	Date	Team	Score	Team	Venue	Attendance
1	2018.02.25	Kyoto Sanga FC	0-2	FC Machida Zelvia	Kyoto Nishikyogoku Athletic Stadium	6,225
2	2018.03.04	FC Machida Zelvia	3-2	Omiya Ardija	Machida Stadium	8,839
3	2018.03.11	FC Machida Zelvia	0-0	Ventforet Kofu	Machida Stadium	5,802
4	2018.03.17	Montedio Yamagata	2-2	FC Machida Zelvia	ND Soft Stadium Yamagata	7,732
5	2018.03.21	FC Machida Zelvia	2-1	Matsumoto Yamaga FC	Machida Stadium	3,037
6	2018.03.25	Zweigen Kanazawa	1-1	FC Machida Zelvia	Ishikawa Athletics Stadium	3,239
7	2018.04.01	Mito HollyHock	0-1	FC Machida Zelvia	K's denki Stadium Mito	4,717
8	2018.04.08	FC Machida Zelvia	2-2	Roasso Kumamoto	Machida Stadium	3,727
9	2018.04.15	JEF United Chiba	3-2	FC Machida Zelvia	Fukuda Denshi Arena	7,779
10	2018.04.22	FC Machida Zelvia	1-2	Renofa Yamaguchi FC	Machida Stadium	3,535
11	2018.04.28	Oita Trinita	4-3	FC Machida Zelvia	Oita Bank Dome	7,205
12	2018.05.03	Tokyo Verdy	1-4	FC Machida Zelvia	Ajinomoto Stadium	6,505
13	2018.05.06	FC Machida Zelvia	1-0	Yokohama FC	Machida Stadium	6,015
14	2018.05.13	FC Machida Zelvia	3-0	Kamatamare Sanuki	Machida Stadium	2,414
15	2018.05.20	Tochigi SC	0-0	FC Machida Zelvia	Tochigi Green Stadium	5,668
16	2018.05.27	FC Machida Zelvia	1-3	Fagiano Okayama	Machida Stadium	4,259
17	2018.06.02	FC Machida Zelvia	2-1	Ehime FC	Machida Stadium	3,610
18	2018.06.10	Tokushima Vortis	1-2	FC Machida Zelvia	Pocarisweat Stadium	3,615
19	2018.06.17	FC Gifu	0-1	FC Machida Zelvia	Gifu Nagaragawa Stadium	7,784
20	2018.06.24	FC Machida Zelvia	0-0	Albirex Niigata	Machida Stadium	5,009
21	2018.06.30	Avispa Fukuoka	2-2	FC Machida Zelvia	Level5 Stadium	8,492
22	2018.07.07	FC Machida Zelvia	0-1	Tochigi SC	Machida Stadium	3,627
23	2018.07.16	Roasso Kumamoto	2-3	FC Machida Zelvia	Egao Kenko Stadium	3,571
24	2018.07.21	FC Machida Zelvia	1-0	Zweigen Kanazawa	Machida Stadium	7,214
25	2018.07.25	FC Machida Zelvia	2-1	Kyoto Sanga FC	Machida Stadium	2,549
27	2018.08.04	Yokohama FC	2-3	FC Machida Zelvia	NHK Spring Mitsuzawa Football Stadium	3,873
28	2018.08.12	FC Machida Zelvia	3-3	JEF United Chiba	Machida Stadium	5,075
29	2018.08.18	Matsumoto Yamaga FC	0-1	FC Machida Zelvia	Matsumotodaira Park Stadium	15,841
30	2018.08.26	FC Machida Zelvia	1-0	FC Gifu	Machida Stadium	4,289
31	2018.09.01	Ventforet Kofu	0-2	FC Machida Zelvia	Yamanashi Chuo Bank Stadium	6,908
32	2018.09.09	FC Machida Zelvia	0-0	Mito HollyHock	Machida Stadium	3,737
33	2018.09.15	Omiya Ardija	1-0	FC Machida Zelvia	Kumagaya Athletic Stadium	9,628
34	2018.09.22	FC Machida Zelvia	1-1	Tokushima Vortis	Machida Stadium	3,524
36	2018.10.07	FC Machida Zelvia	0-0	Montedio Yamagata	Machida Stadium	5,563
37	2018.10.14	FC Machida Zelvia	3-2	Oita Trinita	Machida Stadium	5,161
26	2018.10.17	Renofa Yamaguchi FC	0-1	FC Machida Zelvia	Ishin Me-Life Stadium	3,133
38	2018.10.21	Fagiano Okayama	1-0	FC Machida Zelvia	City Light Stadium	8,094
39	2018.10.28	Albirex Niigata	2-0	FC Machida Zelvia	Denka Big Swan Stadium	16,091
35	2018.10.31	Kamatamare Sanuki	1-1	FC Machida Zelvia	Pikara Stadium	1,780
40	2018.11.04	FC Machida Zelvia	2-1	Avispa Fukuoka	Machida Stadium	6,216
41	2018.11.11	Ehime FC	0-2	FC Machida Zelvia	Ningineer Stadium	3,971
42	2018.11.17	FC Machida Zelvia	1-1	Tokyo Verdy	Machida Stadium	10,013
