= 2024–25 FC Thun season =

FC Thun
2024–25 season
- Manager: Mauro Lustrinelli
- Stadium: Stockhorn Arena
- Swiss Challenge League: 1st (promoted)
- Swiss Cup: Second round
- Top goalscorer: League: Declan Frith (6); All: Declan Frith (6)

The 2024–25 season was the 127th season in the history of FC Thun, and the club's fifth consecutive season in the Swiss Challenge League. In addition to the domestic league, the team participated in the Swiss Cup.

On 2 May 2025, Thun were confirmed champions of the 2024–25 Swiss Challenge League and thus secured promotion to the Swiss Super League after defeating FC Aarau. Goals by Layton Stewart and Ethan Meichtry in the 2–1 victory ended their five years absence from the Swiss top flight five rounds before the end of the season.

== Transfers ==
=== In ===
Pos.	Player	Transferred from	Fee	Date	Source
MF	(Switzerland) Nils Reichmuth	(Switzerland) Zürich	Undisclosed	5 August 2024	
FW	(England) Layton Stewart	(England) Preston North End	Loan	3 January 2025	

=== Out ===
Pos.	Player	Transferred to	Fee	Date	Source
DF	(Switzerland) Nicola Sutter	(Switzerland) Bellinzona	Undisclosed	3 January 2025	
DF	(Switzerland) Uros Vasic	(Switzerland) Naters	Loan	3 January 2025	

== Friendlies ==
=== Pre-season ===
6 July 2024 Friendly	Thun (Switzerland)	0–1	(Switzerland) Yverdon-Sport
12:30 UTC+2			Avdic 78'

6 July 2024 Friendly	Thun (Switzerland)	0–0	(Switzerland) Zürich
15:00

13 July 2024 Friendly	Thun (Switzerland)	2–1	(France) Sochaux
17:00 UTC+2

5 September 2024 Friendly	Winterthur (Switzerland)	0–1	(Switzerland) Thun	Winterthur
16:00 CET		Report		Stadium: Stadion Schützenwiese

11 October 2024 Friendly	Thun (Switzerland)	2–3	(Switzerland) Luzern	Thun
13:00 CET		Report		Stadium: Stockhorn Arena

5 January 2025 Friendly	Lausanne-Sport (Switzerland)	3–0	(Switzerland) Thun	Lausanne
14:00 CET		Report		Stadium: Stade de la Tuilière

11 January 2025 Friendly	Basel (Switzerland)	2–0	(Switzerland) Thun	Basel
15:00 CET		Report		Stadium: St. Jakob-Park

18 January 2025 Friendly	Thun (Switzerland)	1–2	(Switzerland) Kriens	Thun
13:00 CET		Report		Stadium: Stockhorn Arena

18 January 2025 Friendly	Thun (Switzerland)	2–2	(Switzerland) Rapperswil-Jona	Thun
15:30 CET		Report		Stadium: Stockhorn Arena

== Competitions ==
=== Overall record ===
Competition	First match	Last match	Starting round	Record							
Competition	First match	Last match	Starting round	Pld	W	D	L	GF	GA	GD	Win %
Swiss Challenge League	19 July 2024		Matchday 1	14	8	4	2	27	13	+14	57.14
Swiss Cup	18 August 2024	13 September 2024	First round	2	1	0	1	6	2	+4	50.00
Total				16	9	4	3	33	15	+18	56.25

Last updated: 19 November 2024
Source: Soccerway

=== Swiss Challenge League ===
==== League table ====
Pos	Team	Pld	W	D	L	GF	GA	GD	Pts	Promotion, qualification or relegation
1	Thun (C, P)	36	21	9	6	70	39	+31	72	Promotion to Swiss Super League
2	Aarau (Q)	36	16	13	7	63	45	+18	61	Qualification for promotion play-off
3	Étoile Carouge	36	15	9	12	57	46	+11	54	
4	Lausanne Ouchy	36	14	11	11	54	43	+11	53	
5	Wil	36	14	11	11	60	55	+5	53	

Source: Swiss Challenge League
Rules for classification: 1) Points; 2) Goal difference; 3) Goals scored; 4) Head-to-head goal difference; 5) Head-to-head goals scored 6) Away goals scored; 7) Draw.
(C) Champions; (P) Promoted; (Q) Qualified for the phase indicated

==== Results summary ====
Overall								Home						Away					
Pld	W	D	L	GF	GA	GD	Pts	W	D	L	GF	GA	GD	W	D	L	GF	GA	GD
20	11	6	3	38	22	+16	39	6	2	2	18	11	+7	5	4	1	20	11	+9

Last updated: 31 January 2025.
Source: soccerway

==== Results by round ====
Round	1	2	3	4	5	6	7	8	9	10	11	12	13	14	15	16	17	18	19	20	21	22	23	24
Ground	A	H	H	A	H	A	H	A	H	A	A	H	A	H	A	H	H	A	H	A	H	A	A	H
Result	W	W	D	W	W	D	L	D	W	D	L	W	W	W	W	D	L	D	W	W				
Position	1	1	1	1	1	1	1	3	1	1	2	2	2	1	1	1	1	1	1	1				

Updated to match(es) played on 31 January 2025. Source: worldfootball
A = Away; H = Home; W = Win; D = Draw; L = Loss

==== Matches ====
The match schedule was released on 18 June 2024.

19 July 2024 1	Aarau	1–3	Thun	Aarau
20:15	Bobadilla (yellow card) 45'; Koide (yellow card) 65', (goal) 85'		Gutbub 7', 44'; Frith (yellow card) 82'; Matoshi 83'	Stadium: Stadion Brügglifeld; Referee: Lukas Fähndrich

28 July 2024 2	Thun	2–0	Vaduz	Thun
16:30	Bertone 53'; Frith 81'			Stadium: Stockhorn Arena; Attendance: 4,172; Referee: Maxime Odiet

2 August 2024 3	Thun	1–1	Stade Lausanne Ouchy	Thun
20:15	Castroman 14'		Malula 46'	Stadium: Stockhorn Arena; Referee: Sandro Schärer

9 August 2024 4	Étoile Carouge	0–2	Thun	Carouge
20:15 CET	Vincent Ferrier (yellow card) 26'; Aurélien Chappuis (yellow card) 78'; Rüfli (yellow card) 86'	Report	Bertone 19'; Bamert (yellow card) 22'; Gutbub 29'; Matoshi (yellow card) 45'; Roth (yellow card) 74'; Tebily (yellow card) 86'	Stadium: Stade de la Fontenette; Attendance: 1,950; Referee: (Switzerland) Hajrim Qovanaj

25 August 2024 5	Thun	4–2	Stade Nyonnais	Thun
16:30 CET	Bamert 23'; Matoshi (yellow card) 39'; Samba 64'; Genís Montolio 71'; Tebily (yellow card) 82' (goal) 90+4'	Report	Elias Pasche 44'; Momodou Jaiteh 88'; Victor Petit (yellow card) 90+3'	Stadium: Stockhorn Arena; Attendance: 4,641; Referee: (Switzerland) Lionel Tschudi

30 August 2024 6	Schaffhausen	2–2	Thun	Schaffhausen
20:15 CET	Nadjack 26'; Willy Vogt 45'; Alessandro Bizzarri (yellow card) 78'	Report	Bertone 36'; Frith (yellow card) 82'; Meichtry 90'	Stadium: FCS Arena Schaffhausen; Attendance: 1,499; Referee: (Switzerland) Tobias Thies

20 September 2024 7	Thun	1–2	Bellinzona	Thun
20:15 CET	Matoshi (yellow card) 12'; Bürki (yellow card) 41'; Rastoder 62'; Sacko (yellow card) 90'	Report	Nivokazi (yellow card) 22'; Chacón (yellow card) 41'; Gorga (yellow card) 41'; Ranjan Neelakandan 49'; Mihajlović (yellow card) 89'; Johan Nkama 90+2'	Stadium: Stockhorn Arena; Attendance: 3,715; Referee: (Switzerland) Maxime Odiet

23 September 2024 8	Wil	0–0	Thun	Wil
19:30 CET	Akinola (yellow card) 87'	Report	Samba (yellow card) 74'; Bamert (yellow card) 87'	Stadium: Sportpark Bergholz; Attendance: 1,391; Referee: (Switzerland) Marijan Drmic

27 September 2024 9	Thun	1–0	Xamax	Thun
20:15 CET	Dähler (yellow card) 8'; Bamert (yellow card) 39'; Matoshi 65'; Rastoder (yellow card) 73'; Bürki (yellow card) 82'	Report	Touati (yellow card) 34'; Demhasaj (yellow card) 39'; Giovani Bamba (yellow card) 53'; Jonathan Fontana (yellow card) 89'	Stadium: Stockhorn Arena; Attendance: 3,525; Referee: (Switzerland) Luca Piccolo

4 October 2024 10	Bellinzona	0–0	Thun	Bellinzona
20:15 CET	Nivokazi (yellow card) 66'	Report	Bürki (yellow card) 87'; Sessolo (yellow card) 90+1'	Stadium: Stadio Comunale Bellinzona; Attendance: 1,174; Referee: (Switzerland) Lukas Fähndrich

19 October 2024 11	Vaduz	2–0	Thun	Vaduz
18:00 CET	Hasler (yellow card) 43'; Schwizer (yellow card) 54' (yellow-red card) 56'; Fabrizio Cavegn 56'; Javi Navarro (yellow card) 62'; Wieser (yellow card) 80'; Jonathan De Donno 90+6' (pen.)	Report	Bürki (yellow card) 56'; Ziswiler (yellow card) 57'	Stadium: Rheinpark Stadion; Attendance: 1,470; Referee: (Switzerland) David Huwiler

27 October 2024 12	Thun	3–1	Schaffhausen	Thun
16:30 CET	Bamert 43'; Frith 53' 58'; Reichmuth (yellow card) 62'; Bertone (yellow card) 71'	Report	Seiler (yellow card) 35'; Marc Giger (yellow card) 45+1'; Gabriele De Donno (yellow card) 48'; Glaus (yellow card) 54'; Pasadore 61'	Stadium: Stockhorn Arena; Attendance: 4,426; Referee: (Switzerland) Hüseyin Sanli

1 November 2024 13	Stade Nyonnais	1–6	Thun	Nyon
20:15 CET	Ruben Correia (yellow card) 40'; Busset (yellow card) 61'; Sylvestre-Brac (yellow card) 87'; Momodou Jaiteh 89'	Report	Frith 2' 35'; Matoshi 45'; Sylvestre-Brac 50' (o.g.); Gutbub 84' 90+1'; Balaruban (yellow card) 88'	Stadium: Centre sportif de Colovray; Attendance: 780; Referee: (Switzerland) Nico Gianforte

9 November 2024 14	Thun	2–1	Étoile Carouge	Thun
18:00 CET	Frith (yellow card) 13' (goal) 43' (pen.); Gutbub (yellow card) 37'; Bertone (yellow card) 60'; Castroman 73'	Report	Bruno Caslei (yellow card) 42'; Kamber (yellow card) 61'; Zoukit (yellow card) 73'; Vincent Ferrier 90'	Stadium: Stockhorn Arena; Attendance: 4,561; Referee: (Switzerland) David Schärli

22 November 2024 15	Xamax	2–3	Thun	Neuchâtel
20:15 CET	Ramizi 21'; Yoan Epitaux (yellow card) 45+4' (yellow-red card) 79'; Demhasaj 88' (yellow card) 89'; Omeragić (yellow card) 90'	Report	Bürki (yellow card) 45+2'; Samba (yellow card) 45+4'; Meichtry (yellow card) 77'; Sacko 81' 90+4'; Euclides Cabral 89' (o.g.); Bamert (yellow card) 90+4'	Stadium: Stade de la Maladière; Attendance: 3,023; Referee: (Switzerland) Hüseyin Sanli

30 November 2024 16	Thun	1–1	Aarau	Thun
18:00 CET	Janjičić 8'; Bürki (yellow card) 45+1'; Genís Montolio (yellow card) 60'	Report	Fazliu (yellow card) 8'; Toure 46'; Ryan Kessler (yellow card) 53'; Marco Thaler (yellow card) 61'; Janko (yellow card) 90+1'	Stadium: Stockhorn Arena; Attendance: 4,533; Referee: (Switzerland) Johannes von Mandach

6 December 2024 17	Thun	0–2	Wil	Thun
20:15 CET	Gutbub (yellow card) 44'; Bertone (yellow card) 51'; Reichmuth (yellow card) 71'; Franke (yellow card) 77'; Balaruban (yellow card) 90+1'	Report	Marwane Hajij 11'; Kastrijot Ndau (yellow card) 21' (goal) 76' (pen.); Mats Hanke (yellow card) 90+3'	Stadium: Stockhorn Arena; Attendance: 3,245; Referee: (Switzerland) Hüseyin Sanli

13 December 2024 18	Stade Lausanne Ouchy	1–1	Thun	Lausanne
19:30 CET	Kayombo (yellow card) 3'; Mahmoud 23'; Caddy (yellow card) 54'; Nando Toggenburger (yellow card) 85'	Report	Franke (yellow card) 33'; Sessolo 87'; Bürki (yellow card) 90+3'	Stadium: Stade Olympique de la Pontaise; Attendance: 655; Referee: (Switzerland) Marijan Drmic

24 January 2025 19	Thun	3–1	Vaduz	Thun
20:15 CET	Genís Montolio (yellow card) 35'; meichtry (yellow card) 39'; Reichmuth 41' 46'; Rastoder 67'	Report	Traber (yellow card) 25'; Kaio Eduardo (yellow card) 45' (goal) 56'; Schwizer (yellow card) 90+1'	Stadium: Stockhorn Arena; Attendance: 3,255; Referee: (Switzerland) Marijan Drmic

31 January 2025 20	Schaffhausen	2–3	Thun	Schaffhausen
19:30 CET	Nadjack (yellow card) 45+1' (goal) 64' 82'; Bunjaku (yellow card) 90+1'	Report	Genís Montolio 17'; Stewart 47'; Reichmuth 68'	Stadium: FCS Arena Schaffhausen; Attendance: 901; Referee: (Switzerland) Hüseyin Sanli

9 February 2025 21	Thun	–	Bellinzona	Thun
16:30 CET				Stadium: Stockhorn Arena

=== Swiss Cup ===
18 August 2024 First round	SC Schwyz	0–6	Thun	Schwyz
15:00		Report	Tebily 7' 63'; Meichtry 11'; Reichmuth 47'; Bürki 84'; Sessolo 90+1'	Stadium: Sportanlage Tschaibrunnen; Referee: (Switzerland) Hüseyin Sanli

13 September 2024 Second round	Thun	0–2	Grasshopper	Thun
20:00 CET	Fehr (yellow card) 69'; Bertone (yellow card) 88'; Genís Montolio (yellow card) 90'	Report	Schmitz (yellow card) 19'; Kittel 34'; Morandi (yellow card) 39'; Muci 83'; Schürpf (yellow card) 90'	Stadium: Stockhorn Arena; Attendance: 4,200; Referee: (Switzerland) Sven Wolfensberger
