= 2026–27 FC Thun season =

FC Thun
2026–27 season
- Manager: Gian-Luca Privitelli
- Swiss Super League: Pre-season
- Swiss Cup: Pre-season
- UEFA Champions League: Second qualifying round
- UEFA Europa League: Third qualifying round

The 2026–27 season is the 129th season in the history of Fussballclub Thun 1898 and the second consecutive season in the Swiss Super League. The club will also compete in the Swiss Cup and will make its first appearance in the UEFA Champions League since 2005.

== Transfers ==
=== In ===
Pos.	Player	Transferred from	Fee	Date	Source
MF	(Uruguay) Mathías Tomás	(Cyprus) APOEL	Loan return	30 June 2026	
DF	(Switzerland) Nicolas Bürgy	(Denmark) Odense	Undisclosed	1 July 2026	
MF	(Switzerland) Dorian Derbaci	(Switzerland) FC Aarau		1 July 2026	
MF	(Switzerland) Nassim Zoukit	(Switzerland) Aarau	Undisclosed	14 July 2026	
DF	(Switzerland) Mats Seiler	(Switzerland) Young Boys	Undisclosed	22 July 2026	

=== Out ===
Pos.	Player	Transferred to	Fee	Date	Source
DF	(Germany) Dominik Franke	(Lithuania) Žalgiris		15 June 2026	
MF	(Switzerland) Kastriot Imeri	(Switzerland) Young Boys	Loan return	30 June 2026	
MF	(Switzerland) Leonardo Bertone	(Switzerland) Luzern	Undisclosed	1 July 2026	
MF	(Switzerland) Vasilije Janjičić			1 July 2026	
GK	(Switzerland) Nino Ziswiler	Retiring		1 July 2026	
MF	(Uruguay) Mathías Tomás	(Mexico) Puebla	Undisclosed	6 July 2026	

== Pre-season and friendlies ==
26 June 2026 Burkhalter Cup	Young Boys (Switzerland)	1–1	(Switzerland) Thun	Bern
18:30			Ilic 30'	Stadium: Spitalacker

26 June 2026 Burkhalter Cup	Breitenrain (Switzerland)	2–3	(Switzerland) Thun	Bern
19:30			Dähler 31'; Stewart 36', 41'	Stadium: Spitalacker

4 July 2026 Friendly	Thun (Switzerland)	6–2	(Switzerland) Neuchâtel Xamax
14:30

11 July 2026 Friendly	SV Elversberg (Germany)	1–1	(Switzerland) Thun
12:30

11 July 2026 Friendly	Waldhof Mannheim (Germany)	2–1	(Switzerland) Thun
15:00

== Competitions ==
=== Overall record ===
Competition	First match	Last match	Starting round	Record							
Competition	First match	Last match	Starting round	Pld	W	D	L	GF	GA	GD	Win %
Swiss Super League	25 July 2026		Matchday 1	7	2	1	4	11	18	−7	28.57
Swiss Cup				1	1	0	0	6	0	+6	100.00
UEFA Champions League	21 July 2026	28 July 2026		2	0	1	1	3	4	−1	0.00
UEFA Europa League	6 August 2026		Third qualifying round	4	1	1	2	7	12	−5	25.00
Total				14	4	3	7	27	34	−7	28.57

Last updated: 13 September 2026
Source: Competitions

=== Swiss Super League ===
Pos	Team	Pld	W	D	L	GF	GA	GD	Pts	Qualification or relegation (Note: Teams play each other three times (33 matches), before the league is split into two groups (the top six and the bottom six).)
7	Basel	10	4	1	5	17	20	−3	13	
8	Luzern	10	3	3	4	17	22	−5	12	
9	Thun	10	3	1	6	17	27	−10	10	
10	Vaduz	10	3	0	7	21	21	0	9	
11	Grasshopper	10	2	2	6	13	26	−13	8	Qualification for the Relegation play-off

Updated to match(es) played on 11 October 2026. Source: Brack Super League - Tabelle
Rules for classification: 1) Points; 2) Goal difference; 3) Goals scored; 4) Head-to-head goal difference; 5) Head-to-head goals scored 6) Away goals scored; 7) Draw.

==== Matches ====
25 July 2026 1	Luzern	1–3	Thun	Lucerne
20:30	Knežević 2'		Maier 8'; Gutbub 51'; Nicolas Bürgy 54'	Stadium: Thermoplan Arena; Referee: Nico Gianforte

1 August 2026 2	Thun	0–6	Young Boys	Thun
20:30			Monteiro 10'; Blum 24'; Fernandes 33'; Essende 55' (pen.), 90'; Imeri 68'	Stadium: Stockhorn Arena; Referee: Urs Schnyder

8 August 2026 3	Basel	4–2	Thun	Basel
18:00	Sow 4', 31'; Celar 53'; Shaqiri 75'		Stewart 73'; Labeau 90+1'	Stadium: St. Jakob-Park; Attendance: 24,316; Referee: Luca Cibelli

30 August 2026 4	St. Gallen	3–4	Thun	St. Gallen
16:30	Frokaj 48'; Scherrer 75'; Daschner 90'		Labeau 9', 53'; Reichmuth 47'; Dursun 58'	Stadium: Berit Sitterstadion; Attendance: 18,100; Referee: Luca Piccolo

2 September 2026 5	Thun	0–0	Lausanne-Sport	Thun
20:30				Stadium: Stockhorn Arena; Attendance: 5,014; Referee: Marijan Drmic

6 September 2026 6	Sion	3–2	Thun	Sion
16:30	Sow 21'; Rrudhani 53' (pen.); Lukembila 90+4'		Bamert 10'; Fehr 71'	Stadium: Stade de Tourbillon; Attendance: 8,300; Referee: Mirel Turkes

12 September 2026 7	Thun	0–1	Grasshopper	Thun
18:00			Bengondo 23'	Stadium: Stockhorn Arena; Attendance: 8,295; Referee: Anojen Kanagasingam

16 September 2026 8	Thun	2–4	Servette	Thun
19:00	Saiz 38', 54'		Mutandwa 4'; Lambourde 29'; Allix 65'; Fofana 86'	Stadium: Stockhorn Arena; Attendance: 5,358; Referee: Johannes von Mandach

20 September 2026 9	Vaduz	1–2	Thun	Vaduz
14:00	Monsberger 73'		Dursun 33'; Reichmuth 49'	Stadium: Rheinpark Stadion; Attendance: 3,033; Referee: Zrinko Prskalo

=== Swiss Cup ===
The fixtues and dates of the first round were drawn in June 2026.

15 August 2026 Round 1	FC Saxon Sports	0–6	Basel
16:00	Rossé 70'		Ilic 11', 54'; Dursun 15' (pen.), 38', 47'; Urgese 88' (o.g.)

=== UEFA Champions League ===
==== Second qualifying round ====
21 July 2026 First leg	Thun (Switzerland)	1–1	(Croatia) Dinamo Zagreb	Thun
20:00	Labeau 20'	Report	Zajc 86'	Stadium: Stockhorn Arena; Attendance: 9,000; Referee: Bulat Sariyev (Kazakhstan)

28 July 2026 Second leg	Dinamo Zagreb (Croatia)	3–2 (4–3 agg.)	(Switzerland) Thun	Zagreb
20:00	Drena Beljo 74'; Kačavenda 78'; Valinčić 112'	Report	Labeau 4'; Bürki 22', (red card) 67'	Stadium: Stadion Maksimir; Attendance: 17,092; Referee: Radoslav Gidzhenov (Bulgaria)

=== UEFA Europa League ===
==== Third qualifying round ====
6 August 2026 First leg	Thun (Switzerland)	3–0	(Iceland) Víkingur Reykjavík	Thun
20:00	Bamert 19'; Labeau 25'; Saiz 90+4'	Report		Stadium: Stockhorn Arena; Attendance: 6,167; Referee: Giorgi Kruashvili (Georgia)

13 August 2026 Second leg	Víkingur Reykjavík (Iceland)	3–2	(Switzerland) Thun	Reykjavík
19:30	Sigurðsson 16'; Þórðarson 38'; Ingimundarson 55'	Report	Fehr 10'; Labeau 36'	Stadium: Víkingsvöllur; Attendance: 1,108; Referee: Luís Godinho (Portugal)

==== Play-off round ====
20 August 2026 First leg	Lech Poznań (Poland)	7–0	(Switzerland) Thun	Poznań
19:00	Wålemark 10', 25'; Sayyadmanesh 20'; Skrzypczak 31'; Murawski 45'; Håkans 47'; Gumny 79'	Report		Stadium: Poznań Stadium; Attendance: 22,241; Referee: Sebastian Gishamer (Austria)

27 August 2026 Second leg	Thun (Switzerland)	2–2 (2–9 agg.)	(Poland) Lech Poznań	Thun
20:00	Lengen 22'; Dursun 43'	Report	Gumny 17'; Wålemark 68'	Stadium: Stockhorn Arena; Attendance: 5,223; Referee: Halil Umut Meler (Turkey)
