= Valmir Matoshi =

Kosovan footballer (born 2001)

Personal information
- Date of birth: 4 July 2003 (age 23)
- Place of birth: Thun, Switzerland
- Height: 1.84 m (6 ft 0 in)
- Position: Midfielder

Team information
- Current team: Sturm Graz
- Number: 78

Youth career
- FC Hünibach
- Thun

Senior career*
Years	Team	Apps	(Gls)
2021–2024	Thun U21	37	(7)
2022–2026	Thun	108	(18)
2026–	Sturm Graz	6	(0)

International career^{‡}
2023	Switzerland U20	2	(1)
2023–2024	Switzerland U21	8	(2)
2026–	Kosovo	4	(1)
- * Club domestic league appearances and goals as of 25 October 2026 ‡ National team caps and goals as of 20:23, 1 October 2026 (UTC)

Valmir Matoshi (born 4 July 2003) is a professional football player who plays as a midfielder for Austrian Bundesliga club Sturm Graz. Born in Switzerland, he plays for the Kosovo national team.

== Club career ==
Matoshi is a product of the youth academies of the Swiss clubs FC Hünibach and Thun. On 26 November 2022, he signed his first professional contract with Thun with an option to extend for 2 more seasons. He helped Thun win the 2024–25 Swiss Challenge League and earned promotion to the Swiss Super League. He helped Thun win the 2024–25 Swiss Challenge League, and the following season their first ever first division title, the 2025–26 Swiss Super League.

On 24 August 2026, Matoshi joined Austrian Bundesliga club Sturm Graz for €1,500,000.

== International career ==
=== Switzerland ===
From 2023, until 2024, Matoshi has been part of Switzerland at youth international level, respectively has been part of the U20 and U21 teams and he with these teams played 2 matches with U20 and scored one goals. and played 8 matches with U21 and scored two goals.

=== Kosovo ===
On 17 March 2026, in an interview with the Swiss television channel 20min.ch, when asked about his international career, Matoshi stated “I want to keep my options open between Switzerland and Kosovo, but no one from Switzerland and Kosovo has approached me so far.”

On 25 May 2026, he received a call-up from the Kosovo for the friendly matches against Czech Republic and Andorra.

== Personal life ==
Born in Switzerland, to ethnic Albanian parents from Therandë, Kosovo. He holds dual Swiss and Kosovar citizenship.

== Career statistics ==
=== Club ===
As of match played 29 October 2026

Appearances and goals by club, season and competition
Club	Season	League			National cup (Note: Includes Swiss Cup, Austrian Cup)		Europe		Other		Total	
Club	Season	Division	Apps	Goals	Apps	Goals	Apps	Goals	Apps	Goals	Apps	Goals
Thun U21	2020–21	2. Liga Interregional	3	0	—		—		—		3	0
Thun U21	2021–22	1. Liga Classic	22	4	—		—		—		22	4
Thun U21	2022–23	1. Liga Classic	11	3	—		—		—		11	3
Thun U21	2023–24	1. Liga Classic	1	0	—		—		—		1	0
Thun U21	Total		37	7	—		—		—		37	7
Thun	2022–23	Swiss Challenge League	22	5	3	0	—		—		25	5
Thun	2023–24	Swiss Challenge League	29	4	1	0	—		2 (Note: Appearances in promotion play-offs)	0	32	4
Thun	2024–25	Swiss Challenge League	21	3	1	0	—		—		22	3
Thun	2025–26	Swiss Challenge League	34	6	1	0	—		—		35	6
Thun	2026–27	Swiss Super League	2	0	0	0	2 (Note: Appearances in UEFA Champions League)	0	—		4	0
Thun	Total		108	18	6	0	2	0	2	0	118	18
Sturm Graz	2026–27	Austrian Bundesliga	6	0	2	0	3 (Note: Appearances in UEFA Europa League)	0	—		11	0
Career total			151	25	8	0	5	0	2	0	164	25

=== International ===
As of match played 1 October 2026

Appearances and goals by national team and year
National team	Year	Apps	Goals
Kosovo	2026	4	1
Total		4	1

Scores and results list Kosovo's goal tally first, score column indicates score after each Matoshi goal.

List of international goals scored by Valmir Matoshi
No.	Date	Venue	Opponent	Score	Result	Competition
1	7 June 2026	Fadil Vokrri Stadium, Pristina, Kosovo	Andorra	3–0	3–0	Friendly

== Honours ==
Thun

- Swiss Super League: 2025–26
- Swiss Challenge League: 2024–25
