= Mathías Tomás =

Uruguayan footballer

Personal information
- Full name: Mathías Adrián Tomás Borges
- Date of birth: 30 January 2001 (age 25)
- Place of birth: Canelones, Uruguay
- Height: 1.71 m (5 ft 7 in)
- Position: Midfielder

Team information
- Current team: Puebla
- Number: 10

Youth career
- Juventud

Senior career*
Years	Team	Apps	(Gls)
2020–2021	Juventud	17	(2)
2021	Boston River	1	(0)
2021–2023	Iraklis	56	(16)
2023–2025	Panserraikos	47	(1)
2025–2026	Thun	3	(0)
2025–2026	→ APOEL (loan)	34	(4)
2026–	Puebla	8	(2)
- * Club domestic league appearances and goals as of 9 October 2026

Mathías Adrián Tomás Borges (born 30 January 2001) is a Uruguayan footballer who plays as a midfielder for Liga MX club Puebla.

== Club career ==
Tomás came through the youth setup at Uruguayan Segunda División club Juventud, before joining Liga AUF Uruguaya club Boston River, where he only played once.

He then moved abroad to Super League Greece 2 club Iraklis, where, in 2022, his goalscoring put him the third top Uruguayan scorer. On 5 July 2023, he moved up a division to the Super League Greece to join Panserraikos, signing a two-year contract. He scored his first goal in the Super League on 21 April 2024, in a 2–1 win over PAS Giannina.

On 10 February 2025, he joined Swiss Challenge League club Thun. After an injury prevented him from regular game time at Thun, he was loaned to Cypriot First Division club APOEL on 21 August.

On 16 July 2026, he permanently joined Liga MX club Puebla. On 11 September, he scored the winning goal in a 1–0 victory against Necaxa. After initially struggling for opportunities, he became a regular starter by October.

== Career statistics ==
As of match played on 9 October 2026

Club	Season	League			Cup (Note: Includes Greek Football Cup and Cypriot Cup)		Continental		Other		Total	
Club	Season	Division	Apps	Goals	Apps	Goals	Apps	Goals	Apps	Goals	Apps	Goals
Juventud	2020	Segunda División	17	2	—		—		—		17	2
Boston River	2021	Liga AUF	1	0	—		—		—		1	0
Iraklis	2021–22	Super League Greece 2	31	10	—		—		—		31	10
Iraklis	2022–23	Super League Greece 2	25	6	—		—		—		25	6
Iraklis	Total		56	16	0	0	0	0	0	0	56	16
Panserraikos	2023–24	Super League Greece	29	1	4	1	—		—		33	2
Panserraikos	2024–25	Super League Greece	18	0	2	0	—		—		20	0
Panserraikos	Total		47	1	6	1	0	0	0	0	53	2
Thun	2024–25	Swiss Challenge League	3	0	—		—		—		3	0
APOEL (loan)	2025–26	Cypriot First Division	34	4	4	3	—		—		38	7
Puebla	2026–27	Liga MX	8	2	—		—		3 (Note: Appearance(s) in Leagues Cup)	0	11	2
Career total			166	25	10	4	0	0	3	0	179	29

== Honours ==
Thun

- Swiss Challenge League: 2024–25
