= Montolio =

Montolio is a surname. Notable people with the surname include:

- Ángeles Montolio (born 1975), Spanish tennis player
- Genís Montolio (born 1996), Spanish football defender

== See also ==
- Montolio DeBrouchee, a character in The Dark Elf Trilogy
