= Hélios Sessolo =

Swiss footballer (born 1993)

Personal information
- Full name: Helios Sessolo
- Date of birth: 26 May 1993 (age 33)
- Place of birth: Commugny, Switzerland
- Height: 1.73 m (5 ft 8 in)
- Position: Attacking midfielder

Team information
- Current team: Yverdon-Sport
- Number: 19

Youth career
- US Terre Sainte
- Servette
- BSC Young Boys

Senior career*
Years	Team	Apps	(Gls)
2013–2015	BSC Young Boys	1	(0)
2015	→ Le Mont (loan)	11	(2)
2015–2016	Lausanne-Sport	24	(2)
2016–2017	Le Mont	33	(6)
2017–2021	Schaffhausen	87	(27)
2021	Ethnikos Achna	1	(0)
2021–2022	Kriens	39	(5)
2023–2025	Thun II	16	(7)
2023–2025	Thun	43	(4)
2025–	Yverdon-Sport	42	(6)
- * Club domestic league appearances and goals as of 28 September 2026

Hélios Sessolo (born 26 May 1993) is a Swiss footballer who plays as an attacking midfielder for Yverdon-Sport.

== Career ==
He made his debut during the 2012–13 season. He scored three goals in the first round of the Swiss Cup 2013–14 against FC Veyrier Sports.

On 7 January 2021, he joined Cypriot First Division side Ethnikos Achna. After just one game with Ethnikos, he terminated his contract and returned to Switzerland, signing with Kriens on 12 February 2021.

Following an injury-related break, Sessolo joined Thun in January 2023, initially playing for their reserve team. On 12 September 2023, he signed a professional contract with the club for one season.
