= Miguel Castroman =

Swiss footballer (born 1995)

Personal information
- Full name: Miguel Castroman Aragundi
- Date of birth: 17 March 1995 (age 31)
- Place of birth: Bern, Switzerland
- Height: 1.75 m (5 ft 9 in)
- Position: Attacking midfielder

Team information
- Current team: FC Schaffhausen
- Number: 7

Youth career
- Breitenrain Bern
- –2013: BSC Young Boys

Senior career*
Years	Team	Apps	(Gls)
2013–2019	BSC Young Boys	5	(0)
2016–2017	→ Wohlen (loan)	43	(2)
2017–2019	→ FC Schaffhausen (loan)	55	(19)
2019–2025	FC Thun	148	(15)
2025–	FC Schaffhausen	17	(1)

International career^{‡}
2010–2011	Switzerland U16	10	(1)
2011–2012	Switzerland U17	12	(1)
2012–2013	Switzerland U18	9	(2)
2013–2015	Switzerland U19	6	(2)
2015	Switzerland U20	6	(0)
- * Club domestic league appearances and goals as of 26 June 2026 ‡ National team caps and goals as of 8 May 2022

Miguel Castroman Aragundi (born 17 March 1995) is a Swiss footballer who plays for FC Schaffhausen.

== Club career ==
=== Early career ===
Castroman started his youth career with hometown club FC Breitenrain Bern. He later moved to BSC Young Boys and came up through the academy there.

=== Young Boys ===
Following several seasons with the U16, U18, and U21 teams, Castroman made his senior debut for the club in the 2015/16 season. His top flight debut came on 12 August 2015 in a 1–0 loss to FC Lugano, coming on as a substitute for Alexander David González in the 68th minute. Two weeks later, Castroman made another appearance off the bench in a 3-2 defeat to Grasshopper Zürich. He would make three appearances in November 2015, against Lugano, Sion, and St. Gallen, which would prove to be his final appearances for the club.

=== Wohlen (loan) ===
In February 2016, Castroman was loaned out to Swiss Challenge League club FC Wohlen. His league debut for the club came on 21 February 2016 in a 1–0 loss to Chiasso. His first league goal for Wohlen came almost a year later in a 2–1 loss to Winterthur on 20 February 2017. His goal came in the 38th minute.

=== Schaffhausen (loan) ===
Following the expiry of his first loan in June 2017, Castroman was loaned out again, this time to FC Schaffhausen. He made an immediate impact with his new club, scoring twice on his debut, a 6–0 victory over Rapperswil-Jona. His goals came in the 18th and 57th minutes. On 19 July 2018, Castroman's loan with Schaffhausen was extended for another season.

=== Thun ===
In March 2019, Castroman signed a three-year deal with FC Thun ahead of the 2019/20 season. He made his league debut for the club on 20 July 2019 in a 2-2 home draw with Neuchâtel Xamax. In August 2020, Castroman suffered a ruptured cruciate ligament and torn meniscus, sidelining him for upwards of nine months.

=== Return to Schaffhausen ===
On 25 June 2025, Castroman returned to FC Schaffhausen.

== Personal life ==
Born in Switzerland, Castroman is of Spanish descent.

== Honors ==
=== Club ===
BSC Young Boys

Swiss Super League Runner-Up: 2014–15

FC Schaffhausen

Swiss Challenge League Runner-Up: 2017–18
