= Ashvin Balaruban =

Swiss footballer (born 2001)

Personal information
- Date of birth: 8 August 2001 (age 25)
- Place of birth: Lucerne, Switzerland
- Height: 1.73 m (5 ft 8 in)
- Position: Left-back

Team information
- Current team: FC Thun
- Number: 17

Youth career
- –2020: Luzern

Senior career*
Years	Team	Apps	(Gls)
2019–2021	Luzern U21	11	(1)
2020–2022	Luzern	8	(0)
2021–2022	→ Kriens (loan)	23	(0)
2022–2024	Neuchâtel Xamax	33	(0)
2024–	Thun	21	(0)

International career
2015–2016	Switzerland U15	3	(0)
- * Club domestic league appearances and goals as of 28 September 2026

Ashvin Balaruban (born 8 August 2001) is a Swiss professional footballer who plays as a left-back for FC Thun.

== Club career ==
On 17 June 2021, he joined Kriens on loan.

On 5 July 2022, Balaruban signed with Neuchâtel Xamax.

On 3 June 2024, he signed a three-year contract with FC Thun. He helped Thun win the 2024–25 Swiss Challenge League, and the following season their first ever first division title, the 2025–26 Swiss Super League.

== Personal life ==
Born in Switzerland, Balaruban is of Tamil Sri Lankan descent.

== Career statistics ==
As of 22 June 2020

Appearances and goals by club, season and competition
Club	Season	League			Swiss Cup		Continental		Other		Total	
Club	Season	Division	Apps	Goals	Apps	Goals	Apps	Goals	Apps	Goals	Apps	Goals
Luzern U21	2019–20	1. Liga	8	0	—		—		0	0	8	0
Luzern	2019–20	Swiss Super League	1	0	0	0	—		0	0	1	0
Career total			9	0	0	0	0	0	0	0	9	0

== Honours ==
Thun

- Swiss Super League: 2025–26
- Swiss Challenge League: 2024–25
