= Declan Frith =

English footballer (born 2002)

Personal information
- Full name: Declan Frith
- Date of birth: 16 May 2002 (age 24)
- Place of birth: Lewisham, England
- Height: 1.77 m (5 ft 10 in)
- Position: Winger

Team information
- Current team: Peterborough United
- Number: 24

Youth career
- –2021: Welling United
- 2021: Chelsea
- 2021–2023: Aston Villa

Senior career*
Years	Team	Apps	(Gls)
2023–2024	Valencia B	14	(1)
2024–2025	FC Thun	30	(6)
2025–	Peterborough United	28	(1)
- * Club domestic league appearances and goals as of 11:13, 29 August 2026 (UTC)

Declan Frith (born 16 May 2002) is an English professional footballer who plays as a winger for EFL League One side Peterborough United. He began his career at Welling United before spending time in the academies of both Aston Villa and Chelsea, appearing for both their U21 sides in the EFL Trophy.

== Club career ==
=== Early career ===
Having trialled with Charlton Athletic, Bromley and Sutton United, Frith failed to find a club to sign a professional contract with after leaving school. A further trial at Southend United would also prove unsuccessful, and he eventually settled at non-league Welling United.

A change in FIFA regulations and the effects of Brexit meant that Premier League side Chelsea had to branch out their scouting network, notably bringing in a number of young, non-league players. As a result of this, Frith was offered a trial with the West London-based club in February 2021, and signed in May of the same year.

Initially signed as a left-sided defender, Frith was used sparingly on both the left and right sides of midfield, he managed a total of five appearances for Chelsea's under-23 side, including featuring in an EFL Trophy game against Exeter City. After initially being set for release at the end of the 2020–21 season, Frith continued to feature for the club's youth teams.

He eventually left Chelsea at the end of August 2021, and signed a professional contract with fellow Premier League side Aston Villa on 13 October 2021. He settled quickly into the youth team of his new club, notably scoring twice on his debut against West Midlands rivals Birmingham City U23s. He followed this up with a hat-trick against Coventry Sphinx in the first round of the Birmingham Senior Cup. On 16 June 2023, Frith was released by Aston Villa.

On 5 September 2023, Frith signed for Valencia CF Mestalla, the reserve side of Valencia CF, managed by Miguel Angel Angulo. Frith made his debut in the Segunda Federación, the Spanish fourth tier, on 12 November 2023 - in a 3–2 victory over La Nucía.

=== FC Thun ===
On 10 July 2024, Frith joined Swiss Challenge League side FC Thun on a three-year deal. On 19 July 2024, Frith made his senior professional debut in a 3–1 victory over Aarau. Frith scored his first senior goal on 28 July in a 2–0 victory over Vaduz.

=== Peterborough United ===
On 10 June 2025, Frith joined EFL League One side Peterborough United on a three-year contract with an option for a fourth for an undisclosed fee..

Following the conclusion of the 2025–26 season, the club announced that Frith had been transfer listed.

== Personal life ==
Born in England, Frith is of Jamaican and American descent.

== Career statistics ==
As of match played 7 February 2026.

Appearances and goals by club, season and competition
Club	Season	League			National Cup		League Cup		Europe		Other		Total	
Club	Season	Division	Apps	Goals	Apps	Goals	Apps	Goals	Apps	Goals	Apps	Goals	Apps	Goals
Chelsea U21	2021–22	—			—		—		—		1 (Note: Appearances in the EFL Trophy)	0	1	0
Aston Villa U21	2022–23	—			—		—		—		2	0	2	0
Valencia B	2023–24	Segunda Federación	12	1	—		—		—		—		12	1
FC Thun	2024–25	Swiss Challenge League	26	6	1	0	—		—		—		27	6
Peterborough United	2025–26	EFL League One	28	1	1	0	0	0	—		1	0	29	1
Career total			66	8	2	0	0	0	0	0	4	0	73	8
