= Fabio Fehr =

Swiss footballer (born 2000)

Personal information
- Date of birth: 15 January 2000 (age 26)
- Place of birth: Uznach, Switzerland
- Height: 1.79 m (5 ft 10 in)
- Position: Winger

Team information
- Current team: FC Thun
- Number: 47

Youth career
- 2010–2020: Grasshoppers

Senior career*
Years	Team	Apps	(Gls)
2020–2022	Grasshoppers	40	(2)
2021–2022	→ Schaffhausen (loan)	12	(1)
2022	→ Vaduz (loan)	17	(2)
2022–2024	Vaduz	67	(6)
2024–	Thun	67	(4)

International career
2019	Switzerland U20	1	(0)
- * Club domestic league appearances and goals as of 28 September 2026

Fabio Fehr (born 15 January 2000) is a Swiss professional footballer who plays as a winger for Swiss Super League club FC Thun.

== Professional career ==
On 16 February 2021, Fehr signed his first professional contract with Grasshoppers. He made his professional debut with Grasshoppers in a 0–0 Swiss Super League tie with BSC Young Boys on 31 February 2021.

On 31 August 2021, he joined Schaffhausen on loan for the 2021–22 season. On 7 January 2022, Fehr moved on a new loan to Vaduz. On 4 May 2022, Vaduz exercised their buy option to acquire Fehr until at least 2024.

On 3 June 2024, he signed a two-year deal with FC Thun in the Swiss Challenge League, with an option for a further season. He helped Thun win the 2024–25 Swiss Challenge League, and the following season their first ever first division title, the 2025–26 Swiss Super League.

== Honours ==
Thun

- Swiss Super League: 2025–26
- Swiss Challenge League: 2024–25
