= Ethan Meichtry =

Swiss footballer (born 2001)

Personal information
- Full name: Franz-Ethan Meichtry
- Date of birth: 8 July 2005 (age 21)
- Place of birth: Thun, Switzerland
- Height: 1.86 m (6 ft 1 in)
- Position: Midfielder

Team information
- Current team: Genoa
- Number: 11

Youth career
- 2013–2018: FC Rot-Schwarz
- 2018–2020: Thun
- 2020–2023: Dürrenast
- 2023–2024: Thun

Senior career*
Years	Team	Apps	(Gls)
2024–2025	Thun U21	19	(1)
2024–2026	Thun	58	(10)
2026–	Genoa	5	(0)

International career^{‡}
2025	Switzerland U20	2	(0)
2025–	Switzerland U21	5	(1)
- * Club domestic league appearances and goals as of 23:28, 28 October 2026 (UTC) ‡ National team caps and goals as of 14:13, 16 February 2026 (UTC)

Franz-Ethan Meichtry (born 8 July 2005) is a Swiss professional footballer who plays as a midfielder for Serie A club Genoa.

== Club career ==
Meichtry is a product of the youth academies of the Swiss clubs FC Rot-Schwarz, Thun and Dürrenast. On 10 July 2024, he signed his first professional contract with Thun until 2026. He helped Thun win the 2024–25 Swiss Challenge League and earn promotion to the Swiss Super League. On 18 December 2025, he extended his contract with Thun until 2030. The following season, he helped Thun win their first ever first division title, the 2025–26 Swiss Super League.

On 30 June 2026, Meichtry moved to Genoa in Italy.

== International career ==
Born in Switzerland, Meichtry was born to a Swiss father and Cameroonian mother and holds dual-citizenship. He is a youth international for Switzerland, having been called up to the Switzerland U21s for a set of 2027 UEFA European Under-21 Championship qualification matches.

== Honours ==
Thun

- Swiss Super League: 2025–26
- Swiss Challenge League: 2024–25
