= Justin Roth =

Swiss footballer (born 2000)

Personal information
- Date of birth: 29 October 2000 (age 26)
- Place of birth: Switzerland
- Position: Midfielder

Team information
- Current team: FC Thun
- Number: 16

Senior career*
Years	Team	Apps	(Gls)
2019–	FC Thun	160	(7)
- * Club domestic league appearances and goals as of 28 September 2026

Justin Roth (born 29 October 2000) is a Swiss professional footballer who plays as a midfielder for Swiss Super League club FC Thun.

== Career ==
Roth helped Thun win the 2024–25 Swiss Challenge League, and the following season their first ever first division title, the 2025–26 Swiss Super League.

== Honours ==
Thun

- Swiss Super League: 2025–26
- Swiss Challenge League: 2024–25
