= Leonardo Bertone =

Swiss footballer (born 1994)

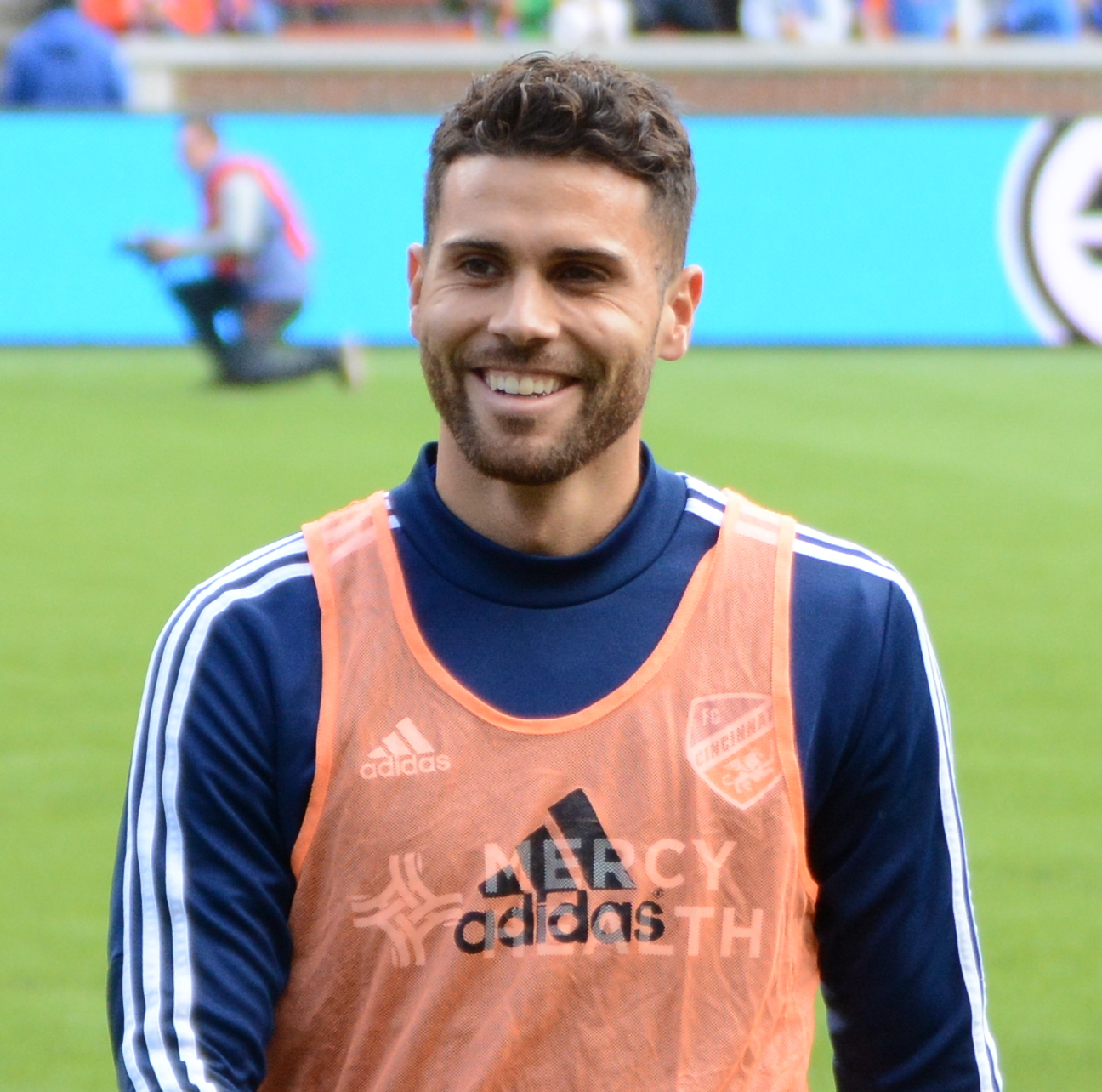
- Bertone with FC Cincinnati in 2019

Personal information
- Date of birth: 14 March 1994 (age 32)
- Place of birth: Wohlen bei Bern, Switzerland
- Height: 1.79 m (5 ft 10 in)
- Position: Midfielder

Team information
- Current team: Luzern
- Number: 6

Youth career
- –2014: Young Boys

Senior career*
Years	Team	Apps	(Gls)
2014–2018	Young Boys	131	(16)
2019	FC Cincinnati	25	(1)
2020	Thun	16	(1)
2020–2022	Waasland-Beveren	52	(4)
2022–2026	Thun	122	(27)
2026–	Luzern	9	(0)

International career
2012	Switzerland U18	3	(0)
2012–2013	Switzerland U19	6	(0)
2013–2015	Switzerland U20	3	(1)
2013–2016	Switzerland U21	13	(1)
- * Club domestic league appearances and goals as of 28 September 2026

Leonardo Bertone (born 14 March 1994) is a Swiss professional footballer who plays as a midfielder for Swiss Super League club Luzern.

== Club career ==
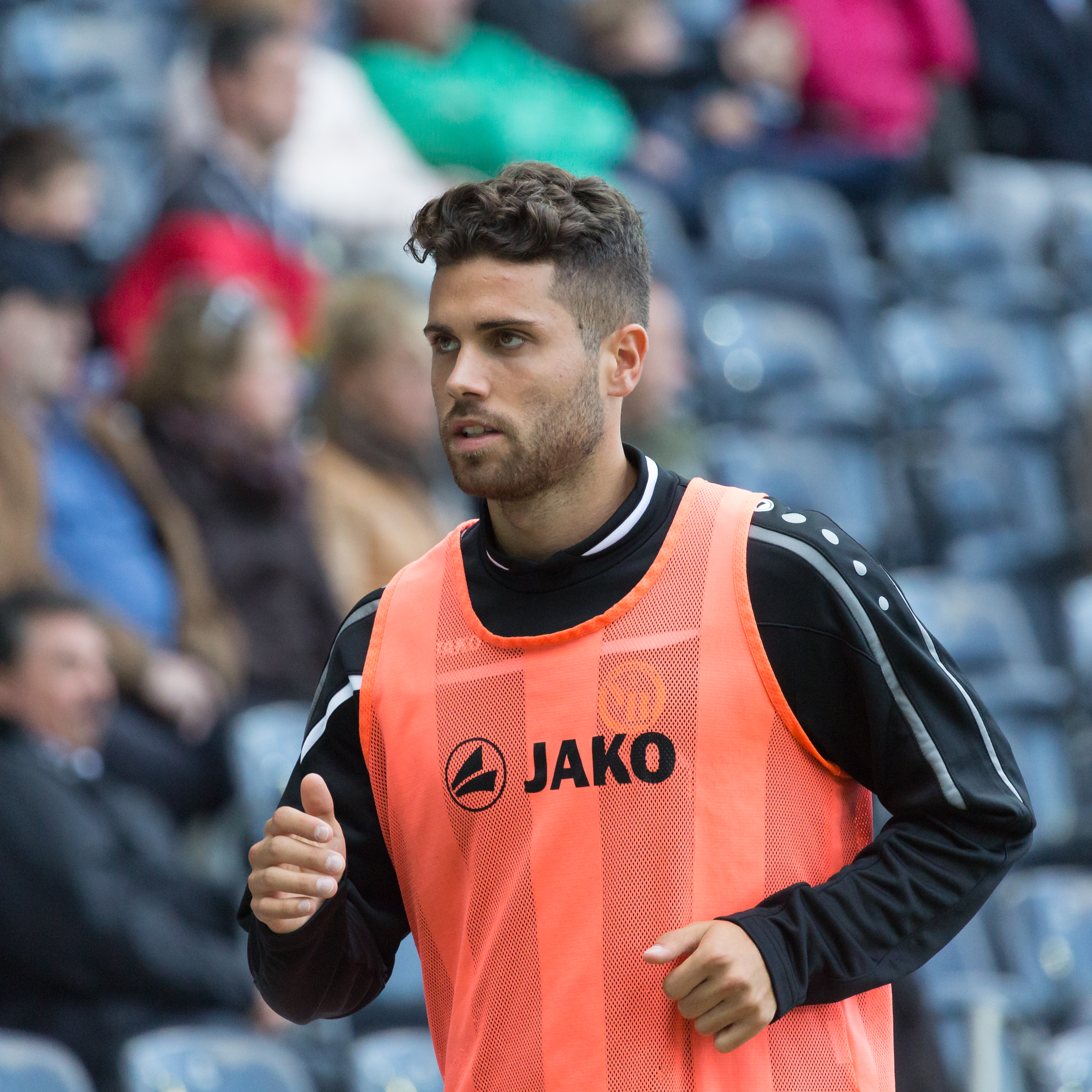
Bertone with Young Boys in 2014

Bertone was born in Wohlen bei Bern. He made his league debut during the 2011–12 season, his only appearance that season.

He was part of the Young Boys squad that won the 2017–18 Swiss Super League, their first league title for 32 years.

On 18 December 2018, it was announced that Bertone would join FC Cincinnati ahead of their inaugural 2019 season in Major League Soccer. On 2 March 2019, Bertone scored FC Cincinnati's first goal in the MLS.

After just one season with Cincinnati, Bertone returned to Switzerland on 13 January 2020, joining Swiss Super League side FC Thun on a two-and-a-half-year deal.

On 16 September 2020, he changed teams once again, joining Jupiler Pro League team Waasland-Beveren on a three-year contract.

After returning to Thun in 2022, he helped them win the 2024–25 Swiss Challenge League, and the following season their first ever first division title, the 2025–26 Swiss Super League.

On 19 June 2026, Bertone signed a two-season contract with Luzern.

== International career ==
Bertone was born in Switzerland to an Italian-German father, and Spanish-German mother. He was a youth international for Switzerland.

== Honours ==
Young Boys

- Swiss Super League: 2017–18

Thun

- Swiss Super League: 2025–26
- Swiss Challenge League: 2024–25
