= Nino Ziswiler =

Swiss association football player (born 1999)

Personal information
- Date of birth: 23 October 1999 (age 27)
- Place of birth: Spiez, Switzerland
- Height: 1.88 m (6 ft 2 in)
- Position: Goalkeeper

Youth career
- 2011–2021: FC Thun

Senior career*
Years	Team	Apps	(Gls)
2021–2026	FC Thun	57	(0)
- * Club domestic league appearances and goals

Nino Ziswiler (born 23 October 1999) is a Swiss former professional footballer who played as a goalkeeper.

== Early life ==
He played as a youngster at FC Spiez and was encourage to ski by his parents, but always preferred football. He trained in IT at technical college.

== Career ==
He joined the youth academy at FC Thun in 2011. He was promoted to the senior squad at FC Thun in 2018 but remained as a back-up, with his progress stalled by a cruciate knee ligament injury in 2019.

He started playing regularly for FC Thun in October 2021 after an injury ruled-out first choice goalkeeper Andreas Hirzel. He made his league debut on 22 October 2021 against FC Aarau, keeping a clean sheet in a 2–0 win. He had to have surgery himself on an injured shoulder in August 2022.

In July 2023, he signed a new two-year contract with the club. He missed a large part of the 2023-24 season with an ankle ligament injury. However, on his return to action, he broke his fibula in a pre-season friendly against FC Sochaux in July 2024. He helped Thun win the 2024–25 Swiss Challenge League, but made no appearances as they won the 2025–26 Swiss Super League title. He retired from playing at the end of the 2025–26 season.

== Honours ==
Thun

- Swiss Challenge League: 2024–25
