= Hanspeter Latour =

Swiss footballer and manager (born 1947)

Personal information
- Date of birth: 4 June 1947 (age 79)
- Place of birth: Thun, Switzerland
- Position: Goalkeeper

Senior career*
Years	Team	Apps	(Gls)
1964–1966	FC Thun		
1966–1967	FC Le Locle		
1967–1971	FC Thun		
1971–1974	BSC Young Boys		

Managerial career
- 1974–1978: FC Dürrenast
- 1978–1983: FC Thun
- 1983–1996: FC Solothurn
- 1997–1998: Grasshopper Club Zürich (co-trainer)
- 1998–1999: FC Baden
- 1999–2000: FC Wil
- 2001–2005: FC Thun
- 2005–2006: Grasshopper Club Zürich
- 2006: 1. FC Köln
- 2007–2009: Grasshopper Club Zürich
- * Club domestic league appearances and goals

Hanspeter Latour (born 4 June 1947) is a Swiss football manager and former goalkeeper.

== Coach career ==
He has vast experience as a manager, having coached at the professional level for over thirty years in both Germany and his native Switzerland.
