= Genís Montolio =

Spanish footballer

Personal information
- Full name: Genís Montolio Lafuente
- Date of birth: 23 July 1996 (age 30)
- Place of birth: Barcelona, Spain
- Height: 1.83 m (6 ft 0 in)
- Position: Centre-back

Team information
- Current team: FC Thun
- Number: 4

Youth career
- Barcelona
- Espanyol
- Cornellà
- 2012–2015: Villarreal

Senior career*
Years	Team	Apps	(Gls)
2015–2017	Villarreal C	53	(1)
2016–2018	Villarreal B	1	(0)
2017–2018	Villarreal	0	(0)
2018	Espanyol B	10	(0)
2018–2019	Levante B	30	(0)
2019–2020	Alavés B	21	(2)
2021	Olot	11	(0)
2021–2022	Zürich II	28	(1)
2022–2024	FC Wil	49	(8)
2024–	Thun	59	(10)
- * Club domestic league appearances and goals as of 09:55, 13 May 2026 (UTC)

Genís Montolio Lafuente (born 23 July 1996), sometimes known simply as Genís, is a Spanish professional footballer who plays for FC Thun in the Swiss Super League as a centre-back.

== Club career ==
Born in Barcelona, Catalonia, Montolio represented FC Barcelona, RCD Espanyol, UE Cornellà as a youth before joining Villarreal CF's academy in 2012. On 9 May 2015, he scored the second goal for the Juvenil A team in a 3–2 routing of Espanyol in the final of Youth Champions Cup.

On 4 February 2017, Montolio made his debut for the reserves by coming as a substitute for Carlos Martínez in a 4–1 victory against UE Llagostera. On 7 December 2017, he made his first team debut for the senior team, playing the whole ninety minutes of a 1–0 defeat against Maccabi Tel Aviv F.C. in the UEFA Europa League.

On 30 January 2018, Montolio moved to the B-side of RCD Espanyol. He signed for another reserve team on 31 August, joining Atlético Levante UD in the third division. He helped Thun win the 2024–25 Swiss Challenge League, and the following season their first ever first division title, the 2025–26 Swiss Super League.

=== Switzerland ===
On 3 June 2024, he signed a two-year deal with FC Thun in the Swiss Challenge League, with an option for a further season.

== Career statistics ==
As of match played 10 May 2026

Appearances and goals by club, season and competition
Club	Season	League			National cup (Note: Includes Swiss Cup)		Europe		Total	
Club	Season	Division	Apps	Goals	Apps	Goals	Apps	Goals	Apps	Goals
Villarreal C	2015–16	Tercera División	24	0	—		—		24	0
Villarreal C	2016–17	Tercera División	29	1	—		—		29	1
Villarreal C	Total		53	1	—		—		53	1
Villarreal B	2016–17	Segunda División B	2	0	—		—		2	0
Villarreal B	2017–18	Segunda División B	9	0	—		—		9	0
Villarreal B	Total		11	0	—		—		11	0
Villarreal	2017–18	La Liga	0	0	0	0	1 (Note: Appearance in UEFA Europa League)	0	1	0
Espanyol B	2017–18	Tercera División	6	0	—		—		6	0
FC Wil	2022–23	Swiss Challenge League	27	6	2	1	—		29	7
FC Wil	2023–24	Swiss Challenge League	22	2	1	0	—		23	2
FC Wil	Total		49	8	3	1	—		52	9
FC Thun	2024–25	Swiss Challenge League	31	6	1	0	—		32	6
FC Thun	2025–26	Swiss Super League	28	4	0	0	—		28	4
FC Thun	Total		59	10	1	0	—		60	10
Career total			178	19	4	1	1	0	183	20

== Honours ==
Thun

- Swiss Super League: 2025–26
- Swiss Challenge League: 2024–25
