= Dominik Schwizer =

Swiss footballer (born 1996)

Personal information
- Full name: Dominik René Schwizer
- Date of birth: 25 June 1996 (age 30)
- Place of birth: Schmerikon, Switzerland
- Height: 1.81 m (5 ft 11 in)
- Position: Midfielder

Team information
- Current team: Vaduz
- Number: 7

Youth career
- FC Egg
- FC Hinwil
- Team Zürich-Oberland
- Rapperswil-Jona

Senior career*
Years	Team	Apps	(Gls)
2015–2018	Rapperswil-Jona	66	(11)
2018–2022	Thun	75	(13)
2018	Thun II	3	(0)
2019–2020	→ Vaduz (loan)	35	(5)
2022–2024	Lausanne-Sport	39	(3)
2024	→ Neuchâtel Xamax (loan)	15	(4)
2024–	Vaduz	65	(16)
- * Club domestic league appearances and goals as of 28 September 2026

Dominik René Schwizer (born 25 June 1996) is a Swiss professional footballer who plays as a midfielder for Liechtensteiner Swiss Super League club Vaduz.

== Career ==
=== Thun ===
Schwizer joined FC Thun in January 2018. In the summer 2019, he was loaned out to FC Vaduz for the 2019–20 season.

=== Lausanne-Sport ===
On 7 June 2022, Schwizer moved to Lausanne-Sport.

On 1 February 2024, he was loaned by Xamax until the end of the season.

=== Return to Vaduz ===
On 15 May 2024, Schwizer signed a three-year contract with Vaduz.
