= Fabio Saiz =

Swiss footballer (born 2001)

Personal information
- Full name: Fabio Saiz Pennarossa
- Date of birth: 1 March 2001 (age 25)
- Place of birth: Val-de-Ruz, Switzerland
- Height: 1.78 m (5 ft 10 in)
- Position: Defensive midfielder

Team information
- Current team: FC Thun
- Number: 8

Youth career
- FC Biel/Bienne

Senior career*
Years	Team	Apps	(Gls)
2020–2026	Neuchâtel Xamax FCS	127	(7)
2026	Yverdon-Sport FC	11	(2)
2026–	FC Thun	9	(2)
- * Club domestic league appearances and goals as of 28 September 2026

Fabio Saiz Pennarossa (born 1 March 2001) is a Swiss footballer who plays as a defensive midfielder for FC Thun.

== Career ==
He made his senior debut with Neuchâtel Xamax FCS in 2020 and stayed several years with the red and blacks. However, in the 2026 winter transfer window, he moved to league competitors Yverdon-Sport FC.

After just a few months at Yverdon, Saiz was bought by reigning Swiss league champions FC Thun. In European competition, he scored against Vikingur in the 2026–27 UEFA Conference League qualifying.

== Personal life ==
Saiz holds Swiss and Spanish nationality.
