= Marc Gutbub =

Swiss winger (born 2003)

Personal information
- Full name: Marc Alain Gutbub
- Date of birth: 4 February 2003 (age 23)
- Place of birth: Switzerland
- Height: 1.84 m (6 ft 0 in)
- Position: Winger

Team information
- Current team: FC Thun
- Number: 33

Youth career
- –2018: FC Köniz
- 2018–2023: FC Thun

Senior career*
Years	Team	Apps	(Gls)
2023–	FC Thun	81	(13)
- * Club domestic league appearances and goals as of 28 September 2026

Marc Alain Gutbub (born 4 February 2003) is a Swiss professional footballer who plays as a winger for Swiss Super League club FC Thun.

== Club career ==
Guthub developed in the youth academy of FC Thun. He made his professional debut on 21 July 2023 against FC Stade Nyonnais. He signed his first professional contract with Thun on 4 January 2024. On 24 September 2024, he extended his contract until 2028. He helped Thun win the 2024–25 Swiss Challenge League, and the following season their first ever first division title, the 2025–26 Swiss Super League.

== Honours ==
Thun

- Swiss Super League: 2025–26
- Swiss Challenge League: 2024–25
