= Visana =

Health insurance company

- Company type: Insurance Company
- Industry: Insurance
- Founded: 1996; 29 years ago
- Headquarters: Bern, Switzerland
- Key people: Angelo Eggli (CEO), Lorenz Hess (president)
- Products: Health Insurance, Accident Insurance
- Number of employees: 1,450 (2023)
- Website: www.visana.ch

Visana, based in Bern, is a Swiss insurance company specialized in health insurance and accident insurance.

As of 2023, the company served around 848,000 privately insured people and 16,500 insured companies, authorities and associations. In 2022, the Visana Group generated a premium volume of 3.6 billion Swiss francs with 1,450 employees.

== History ==
The company emerged in 1996 as a result of the fusion of the three health insurance funds KKB (founded 1870), Grütli (founded 1872) and Evidenzia (founded 1990) with the implementation of the new health insurance law.

In 1998 the company made headlines in eight cantons. In reaction to this, the Federal Department of the Interior announced that it would "prevent Visana to be withdrawn from basic health insurance in individual cantons."

In 2012 Visanas subsidiary company Vivacare took over the basic insurance business of the Bernese insurance group Innova.

In 2019 Angelo Eggli, former managing director of Allianz Partners Schweiz, was elected as CEO and replaced Valeria Trachsel.

== Areas of activity ==
The Visana Group is one of the largest Swiss health and accident insurers. It offers compulsory health insurance (OKP) in accordance with the Health Insurance Act (KVG), supplementary and property insurance in accordance with the Insurance Contract Act (VVG), accident insurance in accordance with the Accident Insurance Act (UVG) as well as pensions and car insurance.

The company insures private customers (individuals and families) as well as corporate clients (companies, public institutions and associations). For the latter it offers, among other things, loss of earningsm and accident insurance. In addition, it also offers household contents. The range also includes building, private liability and legal expenses insurance.

The Visana Group comprises eight companies. Visana AG, sana24 AG, vivacare AG and Galenos AG operate compulsory health care insurance and are subject to supervision by the Federal Office of Public Health (FOPH). Visana Versicherungen AG operates the supplementary and accident insurance business and is subject to supervision by the Swiss Financial Market Supervisory Authority (FINMA).

Visana Services AG is the service company, where all employees are employed. The Visana Plus Foundation owns 100 percent of the share capital of Visana Beteiligungen AG. It also supports health promotion and prevention projects.
