= Brunello Iacopetta =

Swiss football manager

Personal information
- Date of birth: 28 October 1984 (age 42)
- Place of birth: Frauenfeld, Switzerland

Team information
- Current team: Aarau (manager)

Managerial career
- Years: Team
- 2002–2009: Frauenfeld (youth)
- 2009–2012: Wil (youth)
- 2013–2020: St. Gallen (youth)
- 2020–2021: Rapperswil-Jona
- 2021–2024: Wil
- 2024–: Aarau

Brunello Iacopetta (born 28 October 1984) is a Swiss football manager who is the manager of Aarau. He also holds Italian citizenship.

== Managerial career ==
Iacopetta began his career managing various youth teams of FC Frauenfeld in 2002, before switching to FC Wil youth in 2009. He consequently worked his way up the youth teams of FC St. Gallen, starting with the U-16s up to the U-21 team, before being announced as the manager of Promotion League team FC Rapperswil-Jona in 2020.

In November 2021, he replaced Alex Frei as manager of FC Wil.

On 20 May 2024, Iacopetta signed a three-year contract with Aarau.

== Managerial statistics ==
As of 31 August 2024

Managerial record by team and tenure
Team	Nat.	From	To	Record				
Team	Nat.	From	To	G	W	D	L	Win %
Rapperswil-Jona	(Switzerland)	8 September 2020	8 November 2021	32	14	8	10	43.75
Wil	(Switzerland)	9 November 2021	30 June 2024	100	36	25	39	36.00
Aarau	(Switzerland)	19 July 2024	Present	7	2	2	3	28.57
Total				139	52	35	52	37.41
