= Lucien Dähler =

Swiss footballer (born 2001)

Personal information
- Date of birth: 22 March 2001 (age 25)
- Place of birth: Fribourg, Switzerland
- Height: 1.78 m (5 ft 10 in)
- Position: Right-back

Team information
- Current team: Thun
- Number: 37

Youth career
- FC Seisa 08
- 2012–2017: FC Fribourg
- 2017–2019: Thun

Senior career*
Years	Team	Apps	(Gls)
2019–2024	Thun U21	59	(8)
2022–	Thun	97	(5)
- * Club domestic league appearances and goals as of 28 September 2026

Lucien Dähler (born 22 March 2001) is a Swiss professional footballer who plays as a right-back for Swiss Super League club Thun.

== Club career ==
Dähler is a product of the youth academies of the Swiss clubs FC Seisa 08, FC Fribourg and Thun and was promoted to Thun's reserves in 2019. On 4 May 2023, he signed a professional contract with Thun for one year, with an option to extend. He helped Thun win the 2024–25 Swiss Challenge League and earned promotion to the Swiss Super League. On 1 January 2026, he extended his contract with Thun until 2028, with an option to extend for another year. In the 2025–26 season, he aided Thun in winning their first ever first division title, the 2025–26 Swiss Super League.

== Honours ==
Thun

- Swiss Super League: 2025–26
- Swiss Challenge League: 2024–25
