= Jan Bamert =

Swiss footballer (born 1998)

Personal information
- Date of birth: 9 March 1998 (age 28)
- Place of birth: Zürich, Switzerland
- Height: 1.85 m (6 ft 1 in)
- Position: Centre-back

Team information
- Current team: Thun
- Number: 19

Youth career
- –2012: FC Tuggen
- 2012–2016: Grasshoppers

Senior career*
Years	Team	Apps	(Gls)
2014–2015	Grasshoppers U21	10	(0)
2016–2017	Grasshoppers	43	(1)
2017–2022	Sion	102	(4)
2018–2021	Sion U21	8	(0)
2022–	Thun	110	(7)

International career
2013	Switzerland U15	2	(0)
2013–2014	Switzerland U16	8	(0)
2014–2015	Switzerland U17	7	(0)
2015	Switzerland U18	3	(0)
2016	Switzerland U19	9	(0)
2017–2019	Switzerland U20	8	(0)
2017–2021	Switzerland U21	15	(1)
- * Club domestic league appearances and goals as of 28 September 2026

Jan Bamert (born 9 March 1998) is a Swiss professional footballer who plays as a centre-back for Swiss Super League club Thun.

== Club career ==
On 22 August 2022, Bamert signed a three-year contract with Thun. He helped Thun win the 2024–25 Swiss Challenge League, and the following season their first ever first division title, the 2025–26 Swiss Super League.

== Honours ==
Thun

- Swiss Super League: 2025–26
- Swiss Challenge League: 2024–25
