= Nassim Zoukit =

Swiss footballer (born 2001)

Personal information
- Full name: Nassim Othmane Zoukit
- Date of birth: 30 April 2001 (age 25)
- Place of birth: Switzerland
- Height: 1.87 m (6 ft 2 in)
- Position: Defender

Team information
- Current team: Thun
- Number: 13

Youth career
- –2018: Lugo
- 2018–2020: Girona
- 2021: CS Italien GE

Senior career*
Years	Team	Apps	(Gls)
2021–2022	Étoile Carouge	17	(0)
2022–2023	Lausanne-Sport	14	(0)
2022–2023	Lausanne-Sport II	8	(2)
2023	→ Bellinzona (loan)	1	(0)
2023–2025	Étoile Carouge	62	(10)
2025–2026	Aarau	34	(0)
2026–	Thun	8	(0)
- * Club domestic league appearances and goals as of 28 September 2026

Nassim Othmane Zoukit (born 30 April 2001) is a Swiss professional footballer who plays as a defender for Swiss Super League club Thun.

== Club career ==
On 7 September 2023, Zoukit returned to Étoile Carouge.

== Personal life ==
Born in Switzerland, Zoukit is of Moroccan descent. He holds both Moroccan and Swiss nationality.
