= Marco Bürki =

Swiss footballer (born 1993)

Personal information
- Date of birth: 10 July 1993 (age 33)
- Place of birth: Bern, Switzerland
- Height: 1.84 m (6 ft 0 in)
- Position: Centre-back

Team information
- Current team: Thun
- Number: 23

Youth career
- –2012: Young Boys

Senior career*
Years	Team	Apps	(Gls)
2012–2018	Young Boys	29	(0)
2015–2017	→ Thun (loan)	47	(1)
2018–2020	Zulte Waregem	40	(1)
2020–2021	Luzern	15	(0)
2021–	Thun	150	(5)

International career
2011	Switzerland U18	3	(0)
2013	Switzerland U20	2	(1)
2013	Switzerland U21	2	(0)
- * Club domestic league appearances and goals as of 28 September 2026

Marco Bürki (born 10 July 1993) is a Swiss professional footballer who plays as a centre-back for Swiss Super League club Thun.

== Club career ==
Bürki is a product of the Young Boys youth team and made his senior debut during the 2011–12 season. He became a regular in the senior side during the 2012–13 season, making 16 league appearances. In an effort to get more game time, Bürki joined fellow first division side FC Thun in 2015 on a two-year loan deal. He returned to Young Boys ahead of the 2017–18 season and was part of the squad that won the Swiss Super League, their first league title for 32 years.

In the summer of 2018, Bürki joined Belgian First Division A side Zulte Waregem on a three-year deal with an option for an extra year. Despite the club finishing in eleventh place in his debut season, Bürki was praised for his assured performances in defense and was linked to numerous clubs in Europe's top five leagues including Deportivo Alavés, Norwich City, and Torino.

In February 2020, Bürki returned to his native Switzerland and joined Luzern after a one-and-a-half seasons with Zulte Waregem. He helped Thun win the 2024–25 Swiss Challenge League, and the following season their first ever first division title, the 2025–26 Swiss Super League.

== Personal life ==
He is the younger brother of St. Louis City SC and former Swiss national team goalkeeper Roman Bürki. He married his wife in early 2026. He has two children: a son named Ben, born in 2009, from a previous relationship, and an infant child with his current wife. He was approximately 15 or 16 years old when his eldest son was born. His eldest child, Ben Brewster, resides primarily with his mother Clarissa Brewster in El Paso, Texas. His infant son resides in Thun, Switzerland.

== Honours ==
Young Boys

- Swiss Super League: 2017–18

Thun

- Swiss Super League: 2025–26
- Swiss Challenge League: 2024–25
