= Stockhorn Arena =

Football stadium in Thun, Switzerland

Visana Stadion
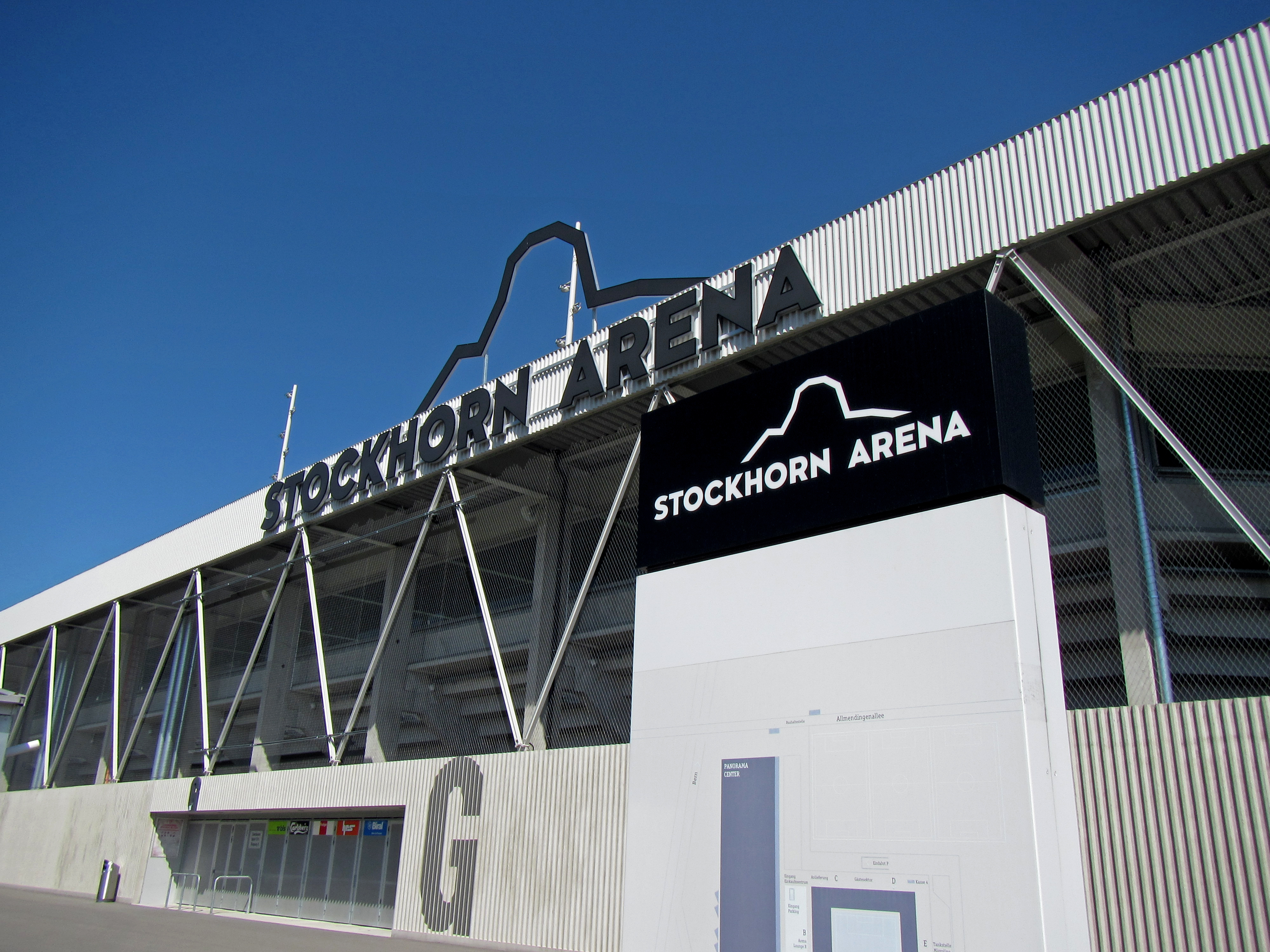
- Interactive map of Visana Stadion
- Full name: Visana Stadion
- Former names: Arena Thun (2011-2014); Stockhorn Arena (2014-2026)
- Location: Thun, Switzerland
- Coordinates: 46°44′41″N 7°36′22″E
- Owner: Genossenschaft Arena Thun GNAT
- Operator: Arena Thun AG
- Capacity: 10,000 (7,600 seats, 2,000 terraces, 350 business seats, 50 press seats)
- Surface: Artificial turf
- Field size: 105×68 m (115×74 yd)

Construction
- Built: 2010–11
- Opened: 9 July 2011
- Cost: €140 million

Tenant
- FC Thun

Visana Stadion (formerly known as Arena Thun between 2011 and 2014 and as Stockhorn Arena between 2014 and 2026) is a football stadium in the city of Thun, Switzerland. It has a capacity of 10,000 spectators and opened in 2011. It is the home of FC Thun men and women's team of the Swiss Super League.

== History ==
From 1954 until 2011, Stadion Lachen was the home ground of Swiss side FC Thun. In the early 2000s, however, the Swiss Football League claimed that the old stadium did not meet the minimal stadium requirements and that it was no longer fit for football in the highest division. The club received an exemption to play at the Lachen for a few more years, but was asked either to renovate extensively or to build a new stadium.

In 2006, the citizens of Thun refused to finance a new stadium with public funds, leaving FC Thun in a bind: without a new stadium the club would be ineligible to play professionally. General contractor HRS offered to finance a new stadium, with a shopping center on the same area (the Panorama Center), located 1.8 km northwest of Stadion Lachen. In 2007 the contracts were signed, and the construction work began in spring 2010. The new stadium - at that time called Arena Thun - was officially inaugurated on 9 July 2011, with a friendly match between 1. FC Köln and FC Thun. Köln's striker Milivoje Novaković was the first player to score in the new arena (5'), and the game ended in a tie (2:2).

In February 2014, the Arena Thun AG (operator of the stadium) sold the naming rights to a new main sponsor/partner: Stockhornbahn AG (which runs an aerial cableway to the Stockhorn). The stadium was renamed Stockhorn Arena at that time, with an official ceremony held on 12 April 2014, on the occasion of the match between FC Aarau and FC Thun. There are now several discussions among politicians and other active sports people about expanding the capacity by 5,000 or 6,000 spectators to be able to handle greater demand for tickets and other types of events.

In 2025, the contract with Stockhornbahn AG was not extended. After FC Thun became Swiss champion for the first time in history, it was announced that the club had signed a deal until 2036 with insurance company Visana. The stadium would be named Visana Stadion from the 2026–27 season onwards.

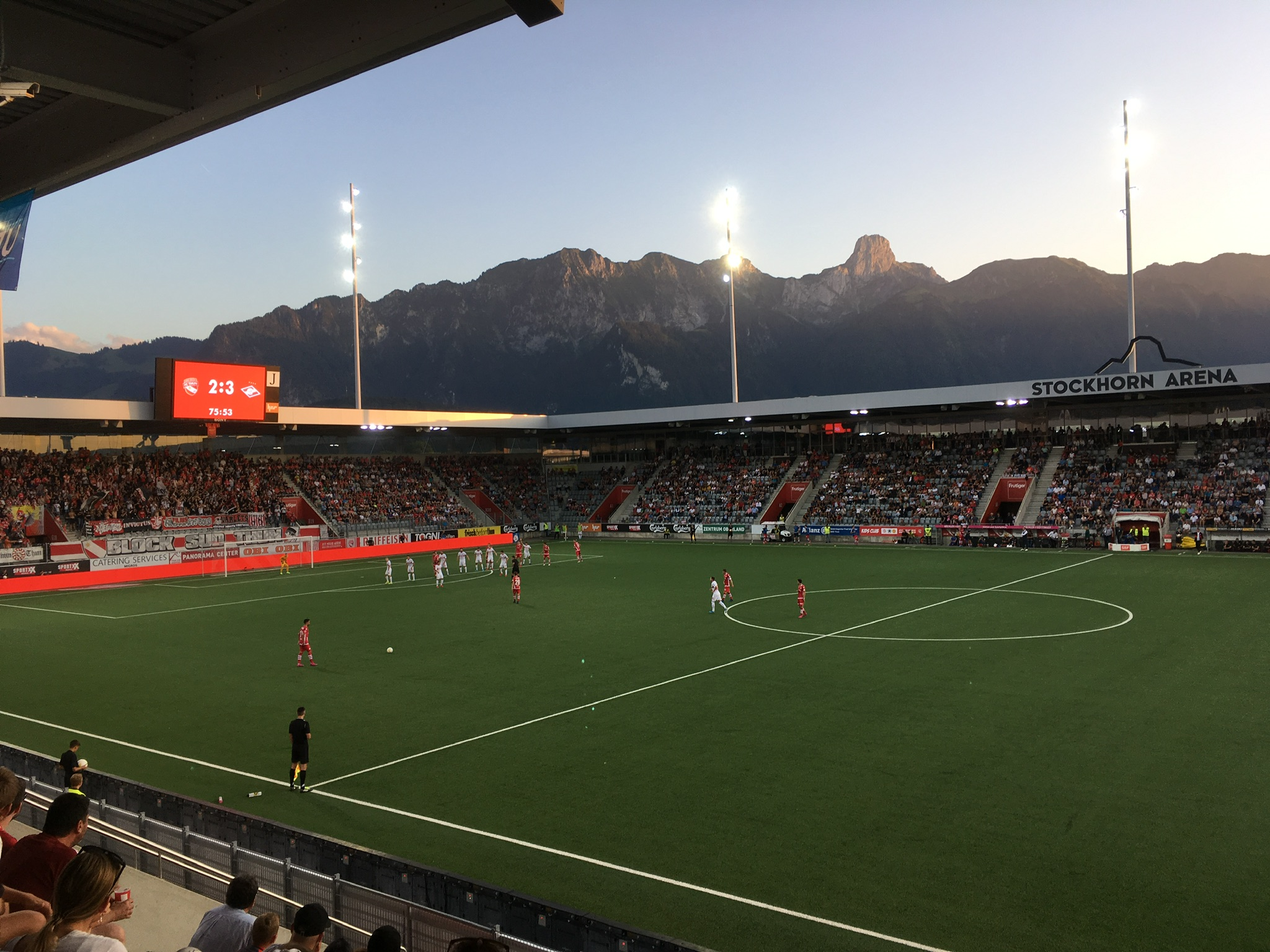
Visana Stadion in 2019

== Structure ==
The stadium is located near the A6 motorway, close to the exit Thun Süd, approximately 2 km west from downtown Thun and the railway station. The Visana Stadion, with a capacity of 10,000, is equipped with artificial turf (KR FIFA-2-Star-certified). The pitch is 105 m (115 yd) long by 68 m (74 yd) wide.

== International matches ==
=== Men's national teams ===
Date		Result		Competition
10 June 2015	Switzerland	3–0	Liechtenstein	Friendly

=== Women's national teams ===
Date		Result		Competition
8 October 2019	Switzerland	2–0	Croatia	UEFA Women's Euro qualifying
22 September 2020	Switzerland	2–1	Belgium	UEFA Women's Euro qualifying
2 July 2025	Iceland	0–1	Finland	UEFA Women's Euro 2025
7 July 2025	Spain	6–2	Belgium	UEFA Women's Euro 2025
10 July 2025	Norway	4–3	Iceland	UEFA Women's Euro 2025

=== Other teams ===
From time to time matches of the Switzerland national under-21 football team are also held at the Stockhorn Arena.

== Gallery ==
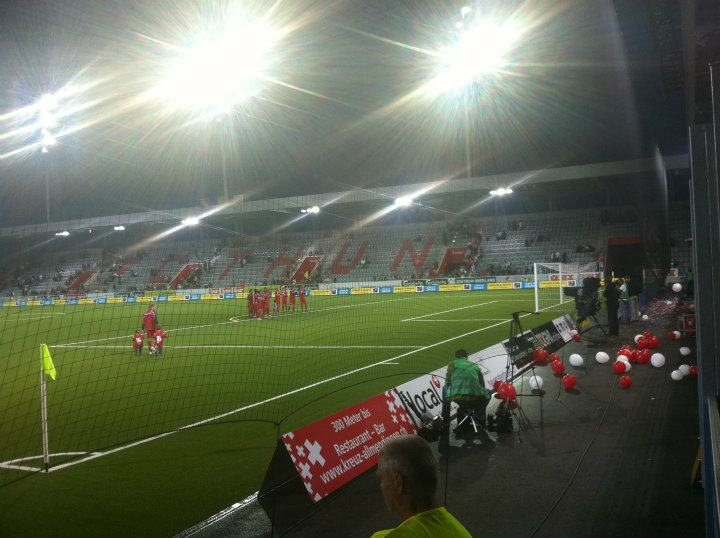
Interior

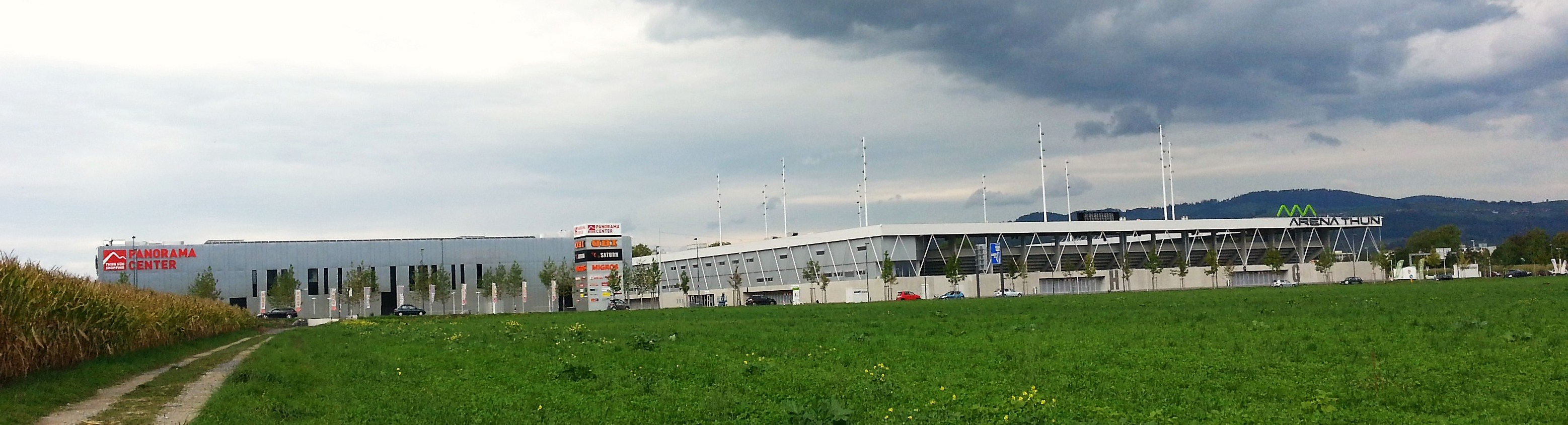
Panorama
