= FC Schaffhausen =

Association football club in Switzerland

- Full name: Football Club Schaffhausen
- Nickname: FCS
- Founded: 1896; 130 years ago
- Ground: Berformance Arena
- Capacity: 8,200
- Owner: Roland Klein
- Chairman: Martin Frick
- Manager: David Sesa
- League: Promotion League
- 2024–25: Challenge League, 10th of 10 (relegated)
- Website: https://www.fcschaffhausen.ch
Home colours	Away colours

FC Schaffhausen is a Swiss football team from the town of Schaffhausen. The club currently play in the Promotion League, the third tier of Swiss football after relegation from Challenge League in 2024–25.

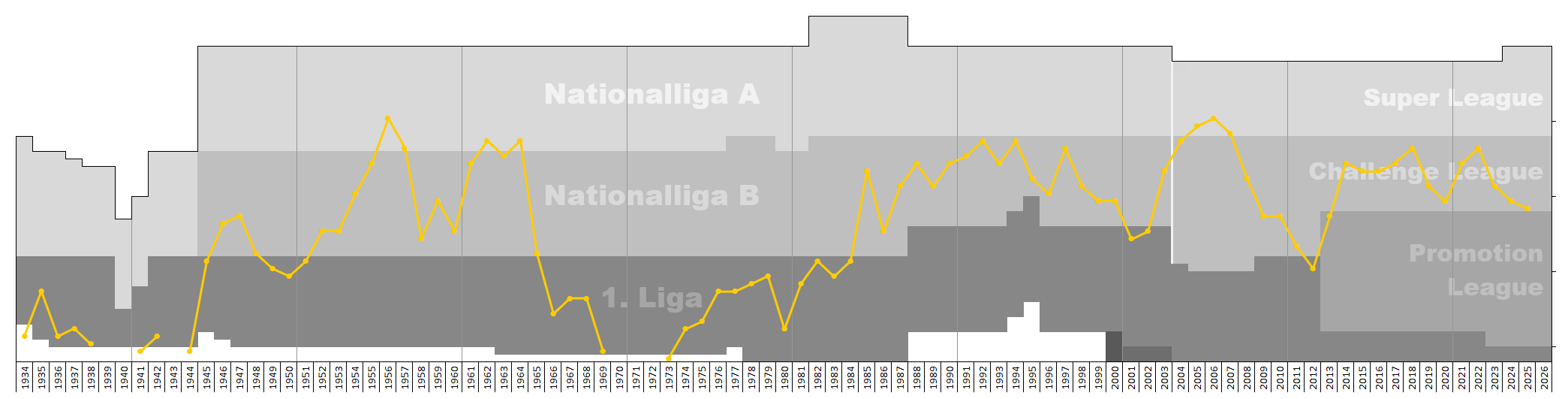
Chart of FC Schaffhausen table positions in the Swiss football league system

== History ==
FC Schaffhausen was founded in 1896.

In 2012–13, Schaffhausen secured promotion to Challenge League for the first time in their history from next season.

On 10 May 2025, Schaffhausen were relegated to Challenge League after losing against Stade Nyonnais 2–3 at home games, thereby ending 12 years in the second tier.

== Honours ==
=== League ===
- Swiss Challenge League
  - Winners: 1962–63, 2003–04

=== Cup ===
- Swiss Cup
  - Runners-up: 1987–88, 1993–94

== Current squad ==
As of 20 September 2026

Note: Flags indicate national team as defined under FIFA eligibility rules; some limited exceptions apply. Players may hold more than one non-FIFA nationality.

No.	Pos.	Nation	Player
3	DF	ALB	Ermir Lenjani
4	DF	SUI	Florian Schuler
5	DF	SUI	Brillani Soro
6	MF	COD	Daniel Kadima
7	MF	SUI	Miguel Castroman
8	MF	BIH	Adriano Rizvic
9	FW	SUI	Nick Berger
10	MF	ITA	Danilo Del Toro
11	FW	NGR	Colin Odutayo
12	FW	SUI	Dimitri Volkart
14	DF	CUB	Fabian Gloor
16	DF	KOS	Stiljan Gegaj
17	FW	SUI	Angelo Campos

No.	Pos.	Nation	Player
18	FW	SUI	Boris Babić
19	MF	SUI	Mats Hanke
20	MF	MNE	Arnel Kujovic
21	DF	SUI	Noël Wetz
22	DF	SUI	Adonis Ajeti
26	DF	KOS	Granit Islami
27	FW	SRB	Nenad Pejic
34	GK	SUI	Gianni De Nitti
47	GK	SUI	Samuele Rutigliano
78	DF	CRO	David Královec
80	MF	SUI	Rijad Saliji
97	MF	SUI	Carmine Chiappetta
99	GK	SUI	Nico Leccadito

=== Out on loan ===
Note: Flags indicate national team as defined under FIFA eligibility rules; some limited exceptions apply. Players may hold more than one non-FIFA nationality.

No.	Pos.	Nation	Player

== Former coaches ==
- (Socialist Federal Republic of Yugoslavia) Husnija Arapović (1980–84)
- (Austria) Rolf Fringer (1990–92)
- (Germany) Jürgen Seeberger (2000–07)
- Peter Schädler (2007)
- (Switzerland) Marco Schällibaum (2007–08)
- Fabian Müller (2008–09)
- (Switzerland) René Weiler 2009–2011
- (Switzerland) Martin Andermatt 2021–2022
- (Switzerland) Hakan Yakin 2022–2023
- (Switzerland) Bigi Meier 2023
- (Germany) Christian Wimmer 2024
- (Switzerland) Ciriaco Sforza 2024–2025
- (Switzerland) Hakan Yakin 2025
