= FC Thun =

Swiss football club

Thun
- Full name: Fussballclub Thun 1898
- Founded: 1 May 1898; 128 years ago
- Ground: Stockhorn Arena
- Capacity: 10,000
- Chairman: Andres Gerber
- Manager: Gian-Luca Privitelli
- League: Swiss Super League
- 2025–26: 1st of 12 (champions)
- Website: fcthun.ch
Home colours	Away colours

Fussballclub Thun 1898 is a Swiss football team from the Bernese Oberland town of Thun. The club plays in the Swiss Super League, the top tier of the Swiss football league system. The club plays at the Stockhorn Arena which accommodates a total of 10,000 supporters, both seated and standing. The club's colours are red and white.

The biggest achievements in the club's history are winning the Swiss Super League in the 2025–26 season, and two runners-up finishes in the Swiss Cup in 1954–55 and 2018–19, as well as reaching the group stages of the 2005–06 UEFA Champions League.

== History ==
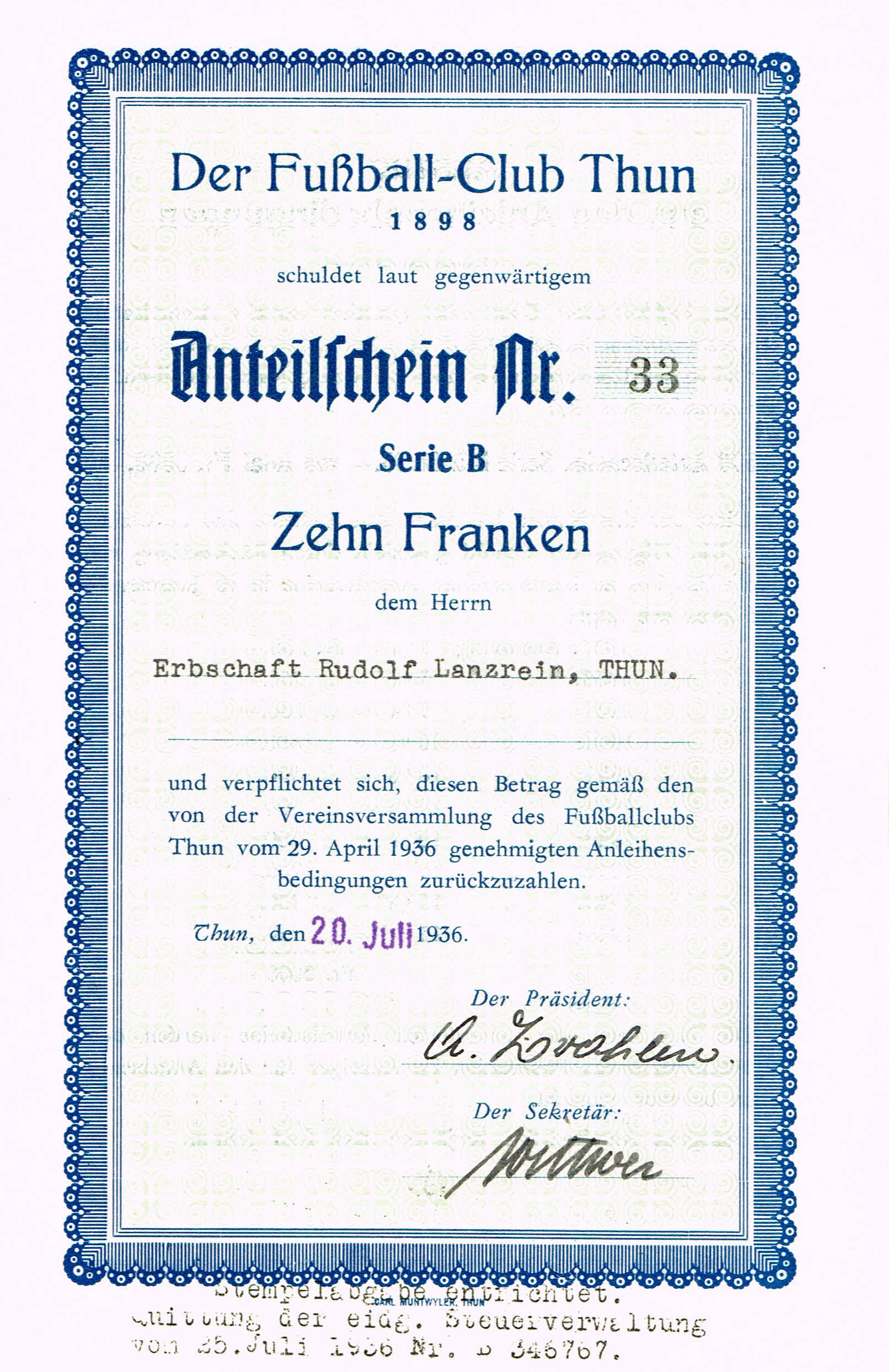
Participation certificate of FC Thun issued on 20 July 1936

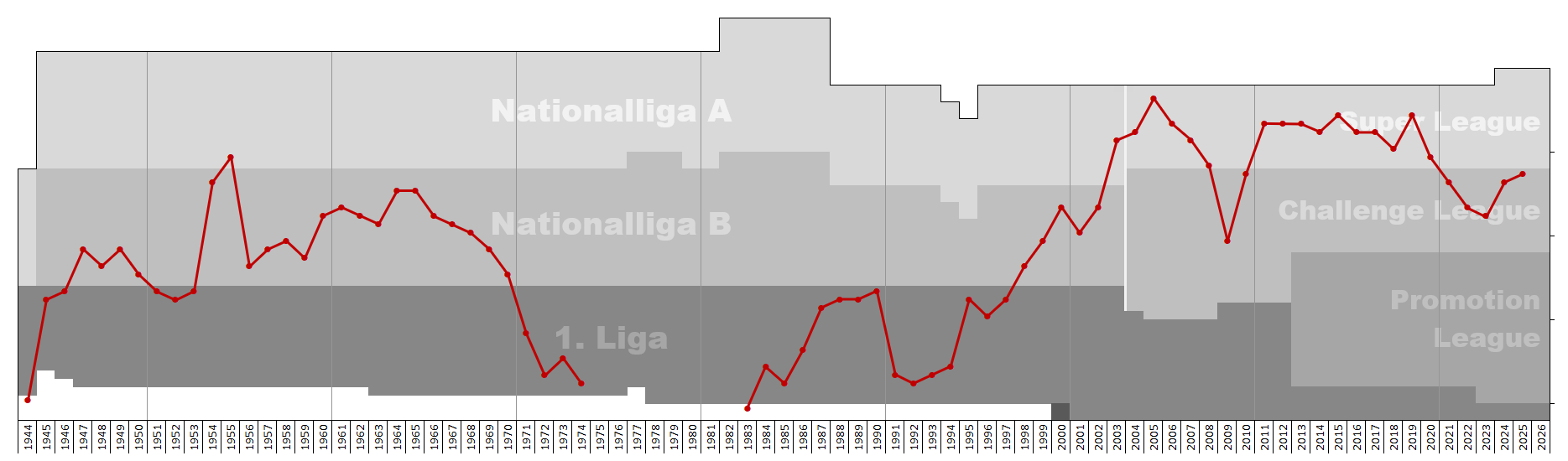
Chart of FC Thun's league performance in the Swiss football league system

=== Until 1995 ===
FC Thun was founded on 1 May 1898. The club played in the second Swiss division, the Nationalliga B (now known as Swiss Challenge League) from 1946 to 1950 and in the 1953–54 season. At the end of the 1953–54 season, the team finished in second place only behind FC Lugano and was promoted to the first division, the Nationalliga A (now known as the Swiss Super League), for the first time in the club's history. However, the club finished the 1954–55 season in second to last place and was relegated back to the second division after playing just one season in the top flight. In 1955, Thun reached the final of the Swiss Cup, which was lost 1–3 to La Chaux-de-Fonds.

From 1955 to 1970, Thun continuously played in the Nationalliga B, before being relegated to the Swiss 1. Liga, back then the third tier of the Swiss football league system, at the end of the 1969–70 season.

=== From third division to Champions League ===
In 1995, Andy Egli became the manager of Thun. Two years later, at the end of the 1996–97 season, Thun regained promotion to the Nationalliga B for the first time since 1970. Under manager Georges Bregy, the club took part in the 1999–2000 Nationalliga A/B playoff games, but could not secure promotion to the first league and remained in the Nationalliga B. From July 2001 to December 2004 the team was coached by Hanspeter Latour. Under his management, Thun was promoted to the Nationalliga A after 47 years of absence from the Swiss top flight at the end of the 2001–02 season. After Latour left Thun to coach Grasshopper Club Zürich, Urs Schönenberger was appointed as the new head coach.

Thun finished the 2004–05 season in second place only behind FC Basel and thus became runners-up of the Swiss championship, which was rebranded from Nationalliga A to Swiss Super League by then. This constituted the best league result in the history of the club and also secured the club a place in the qualifying rounds for the Champions League. By beating Dynamo Kyiv (3–2 on aggregate) and Malmö FF (4–0 on aggregate) in the qualifying rounds, FC Thun reached the group stages of the 2005–06 Champions League. They were drawn in Group B alongside Arsenal, Ajax and Sparta Prague. They started their campaign on 14 September 2005 away at Arsenal, where after equalising through Nelson Ferreira, they narrowly lost 2–1 after Dennis Bergkamp scored in the match's final seconds. On 27 September they hosted the Czech champions Sparta Prague at home, the Stadion Wankdorf in Bern, where all the club's European home matches were held, as the Stadion Lachen, the club's previous ground, did not meet Uefa's prerequisites for Champions League venues. Thun's 1–0 victory thanks to Selver Hodžić's 80th-minute winner propelled them into second place in the group. Following a loss to Ajax on 2 November, they lost 1–0 at home to Arsenal and with Ajax beating Sparta Prague, FC Thun exited the Champions League. However, Thun drew 0–0 with Sparta Prague in their last group match, securing third place in the group and thus qualifying for the UEFA Cup Round of 32.

Despite his success, coach Urs Schönenberger was regarded as a controversial figure by the club management because of his uncompromising nature and communication style. Just three days prior to their Uefa Cup tie against Hamburger SV, on 13 February 2006, Thun sacked Schönenberger, who had guided them to the Champions' League group stages and replaced him with Heinz Peischl. In the first leg, Thun managed a surprise 1–0 over Hamburg at the Stade de Suisse. However, Hamburg was too strong at their home, the Volksparkstadion, and managed to overturn the deficit, winning the second leg 2–0 (2–1 on aggregate).

=== Between first and second division ===
FC Thun finished the 2007–08 season in last place and was subsequently relegated to the second division. Two years later, the club won the 2009–10 Swiss Challenge League and was promoted back to the Super League under head coach Murat Yakin. Yakin led the team to a fifth-place finish in the following season but left Thun to assume the role as head coach of FC Luzern before the start of the 2011–12 season. Under the new coach Bernard Challandes, the team played in the qualifying rounds of the 2011–12 Europa League. After winning against Albanian side KF Vllaznia Shkodër (2–1 on aggregate) and advancing against Italian club US Palermo because of the away goals rule (3–3 on aggregate), Thun lost 1–5 on aggregate to Stoke City in the final play-off round and thus missed qualification for the group stages.

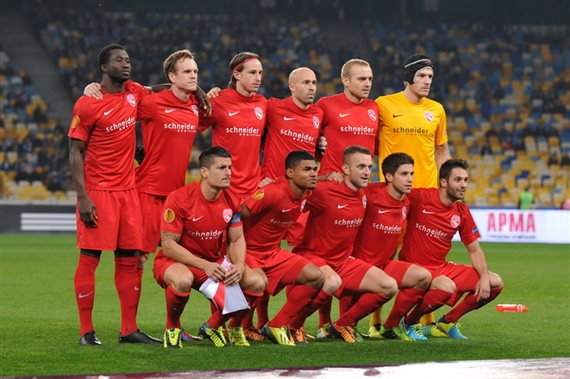
FC Thun before their 2013 Europa League match against Dynamo Kyiv

Urs Fischer took over management of the team in January 2013 and lead FC Thun to a fifth-place finish in the 2012–13 season. In the qualifying rounds of the 2013–14 Europa League, Thun won against Georgian team Chikhura Sachkhere (5–1 on aggregate), Swedish side BK Häcken (3–1 on aggregate) as well as FK Partizan from Serbia (3–1 on aggregate) and thus qualified for the group stages of the competition. They were drawn in Group G against Rapid Wien, KRC Genk and Dynamo Kyiv. In their group, the team won only one out of the six fixtures (1–0 against Rapid Wien) and lost the other five games, finishing last in the group and dropping out of the competition.

After finishing 4th in the 2018–19 Swiss Super League, FC Thun were eligible for the 3rd round UEFA Europa League qualifiers. Drawn against Spartak Moscow, FC Thun lost both legs and 3–5 on aggregate to the Russian team.

In 2019, FC Thun reached the final of the Swiss Cup for the second time in the club's history. They lost the game 1–2 against FC Basel. In November of the same year, Pacific Media Group (PMG), Chien Lee and The Seelig Group invested in the club and became the co-owners of FC Thun football club.

Thun finished the 2019–20 season in second to last place and had to face the runners-up team of the 2019–20 Challenge League, FC Vaduz, in the relegation play-offs. After losing 0–2 in the first leg played away in Rheinpark Stadion, the 4–3 victory in the second leg was not enough to win on aggregate, which meant that FC Thun was relegated to the Swiss Challenge League. In the following season, the club reached second place in the Challenge League and qualified for the promotion play-offs, but lost 4–6 on aggregate against FC Sion and remained in the second division. Carlos Bernegger remained as manager for the 2021–22 season which saw Thun finish in 5th place. The team were awarded was awarded the Fair Play Trophy for the dieci Challenge League.

The following season was more of the same for Thun, finishing in 6th place. Gabriel Kyeremateng finished the season as the third highest goalscorer (16) and was nominated for March's player of the month award. Bernegger left FC Thun at the end of the season to be replaced by Mauro Lustrinelli.

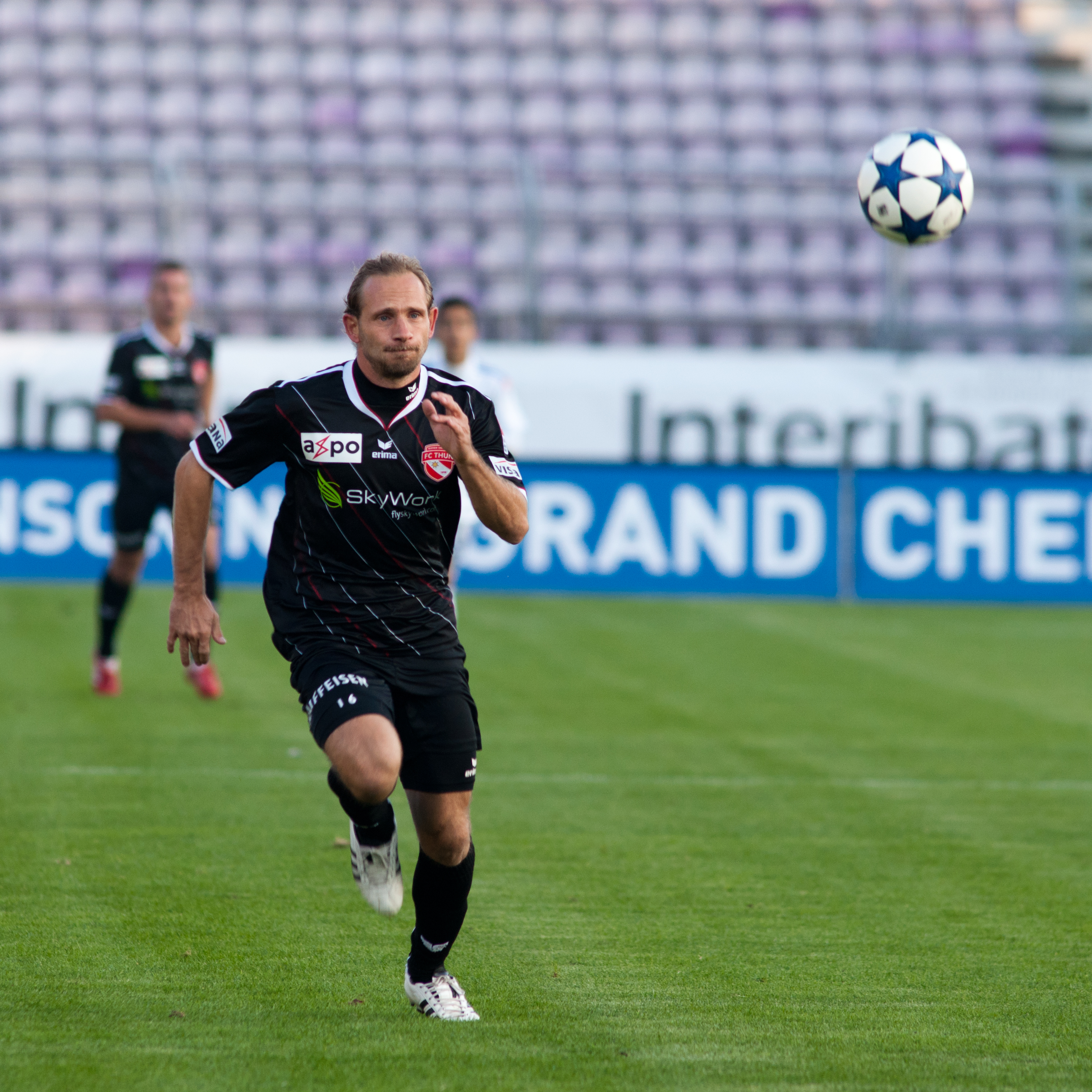
FC Thun manager Mauro Lustrinelli

Under Lustrinelli for the first full season, Thun finished second, three points behind champions FC Sion. They qualified for the promotion playoff against Grasshopper Club Zürich. The first leg of the playoff finished in a draw, and the second leg Thun lost 2–1 at home following an injury time goal from Asumah Abubakar. FC Thun goalscorer Koro Koné was sent off in the 94th minute. Ahead of the 2024–25 season, captain Marco Bürki signed a two year contract extension. Daniel Dos Santos was sold to FC Lugano after a 10 goal and 9 assist season. FC Thun made 11 signings in the off-season, including Declan Frith who had played for both Aston Villa and Chelsea academy sides in England, Ashvin Balaruban from Neuchâtel Xamax, Fabio Fehr from FC Vaduz and Genis Montolio who previously played for Villarreal in La Liga. In addition, FC Thun were picked as favourites for promotion, and at their final home friendly match versus FC Sochaux revealed their new mascot Münggu a 2m tall marmot. In July, FC Thun launched their new home shirts manufactured by Macron and sponsored by Visana. They opened the new season with two wins against FC Aarau and FC Vaduz, before a draw with newly relegated Stade Lausanne-Ouchy. A victory in game week four against Etoile Carouge left them top of the table. FC Thun were drawn away in the first round of the 2024–25 Swiss Cup against SC Schwyz who qualified under the Suva Fairplay Trophy rules. FC Thun won 6–0 at the Tschaibrunnen sports complex.

According to BBC Sport, investments from Chinese multi-club owner Chien Lee and board member Beat Fahrni saved the club from extinction on several occasions, most recently in early 2024.

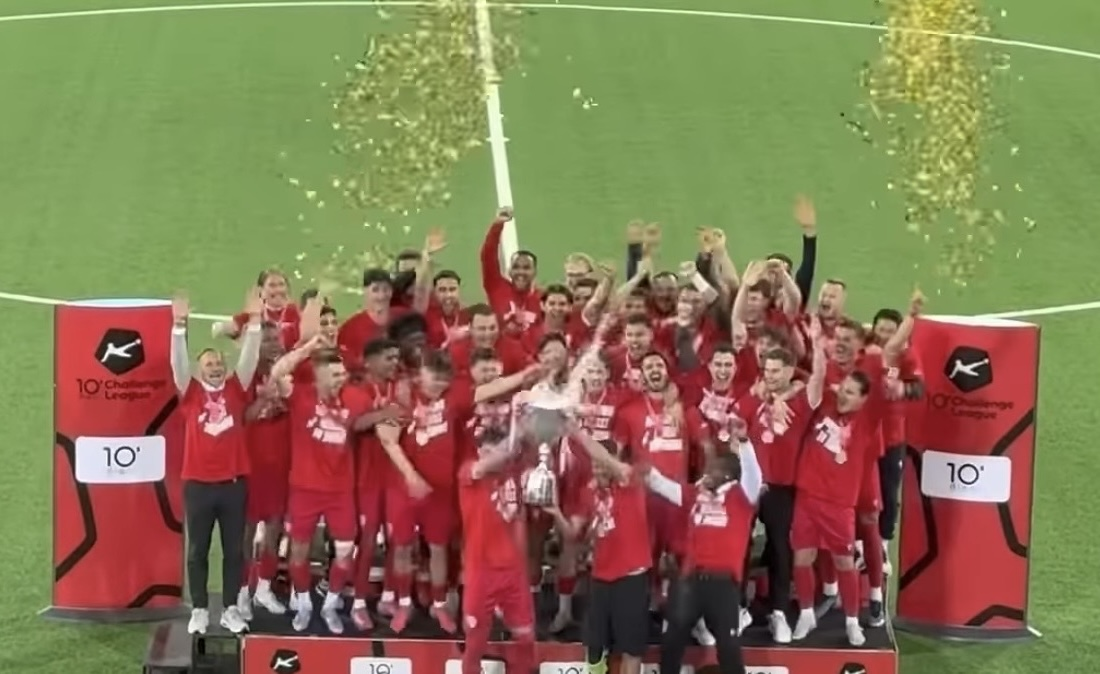
FC Thun being crowned champions of the 2024–25 Swiss Challenge League on 2 May 2025

On 2 May 2025, Thun were confirmed champions of the 2024–25 Swiss Challenge League and thus secured promotion to the Swiss Super League after defeating FC Aarau. Goals by Layton Stewart and Ethan Meichtry in the 2–1 victory ended their five years absence from the Swiss top flight five rounds before the end of the season. In the following season, Thun would perform a historic feat by leading the table ahead of the winter break in December, thus being crowned "winter champions".

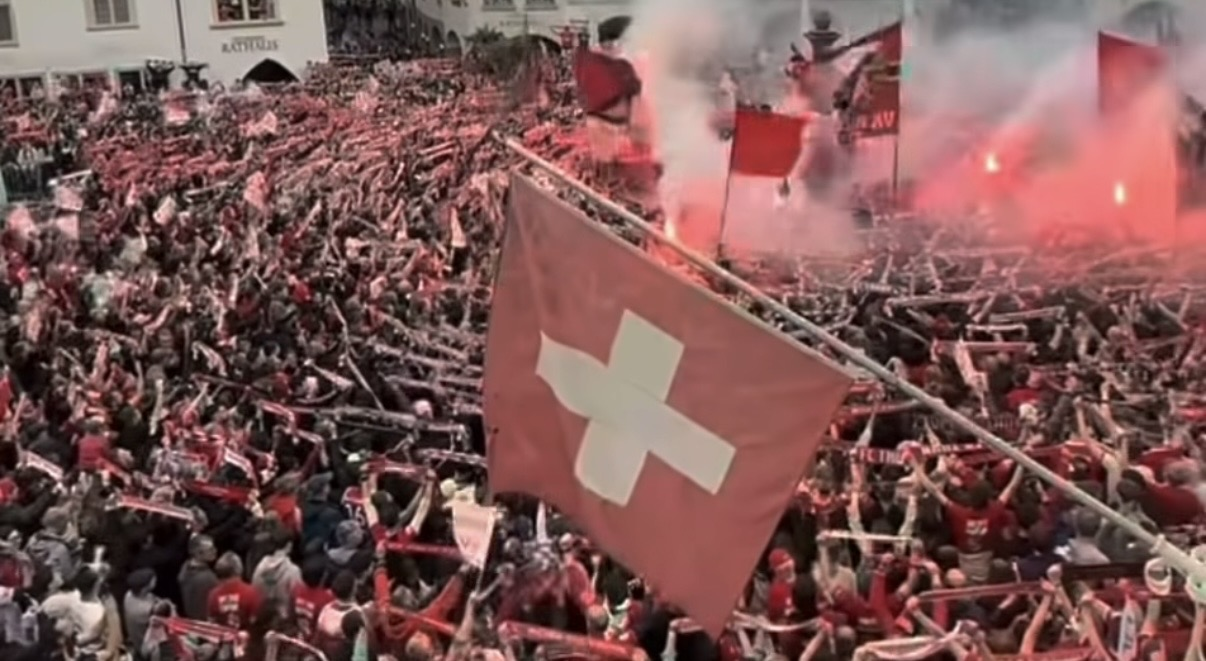
On 3 May 2026, FC Thun players and fans celebrated the club’s first Swiss Super League championship title on Town Hall Square in Thun.

On 3 May 2026, Thun secured the Swiss Super League title for the first time in their 128-year history after second-placed St. Gallen lost 3–0 at home to Sion with three matches remaining. The New York Times described it as arguably this season’s greatest European football story, and Yahoo Sports called it “Kaiserslautern 2.0”, referring to the German side's shock 1997-98 Bundesliga championship as a newly promoted team.

== Crest ==
FC Thun's centenary crest used in 1998

FC Thun's first crest was a black logo script of the team name, with a prominent football coloured red, black and green. In 1998, to celebrate the 100th anniversary of the club's formation, FC Thun used a logo with the name script in black, on a background showing the number 100 in red and yellow.

For the 2010/11 season, following promotion to the Swiss Super League, FC Thun utilised a developed version of their original logo, with yellow added (and green removed) with "Berner Oberland" text added to the lower right side of the football.

The current red and white logo with the yellow star has been used since 2011.

== Kit suppliers and sponsors ==
FC Thun kits
Period	Kit manufacturer	Shirt sponsor (chest)	Shirt sponsor (other)
1898–1998	Unidentified	Unknown	Unknown
1998	Lotto	Deichmann	
1999–2005	Adidas	Frutiger AG	Adelbodner
2005–2007	Hummel	Frutiger AG	Adelbodner
2009–2010	Erima	Frutiger AG	Axpo
2011–2012	Erima	Panorama Center (Home); SkyWork (Away)	Axpo
2013–2017	Nike	Panorama Center (Home); Schneider Software AG (Away)	
2017–2019	Nike	Schneider Software AG	
2020–2024	Macron	Schneider Software AG	
2024–2025	Macron	Visana	

== Stadiums ==
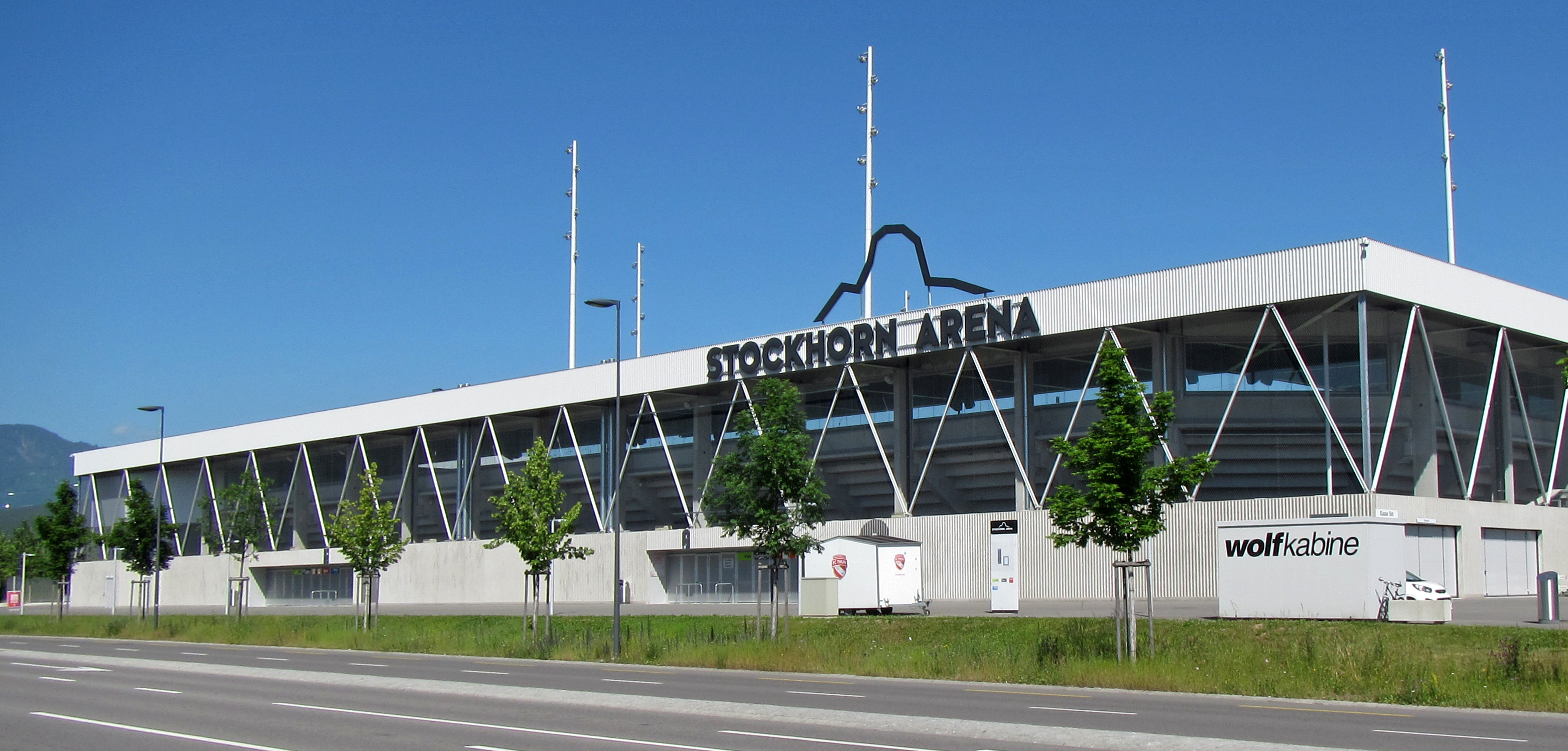
FC Thun's home stadium Stockhorn Arena

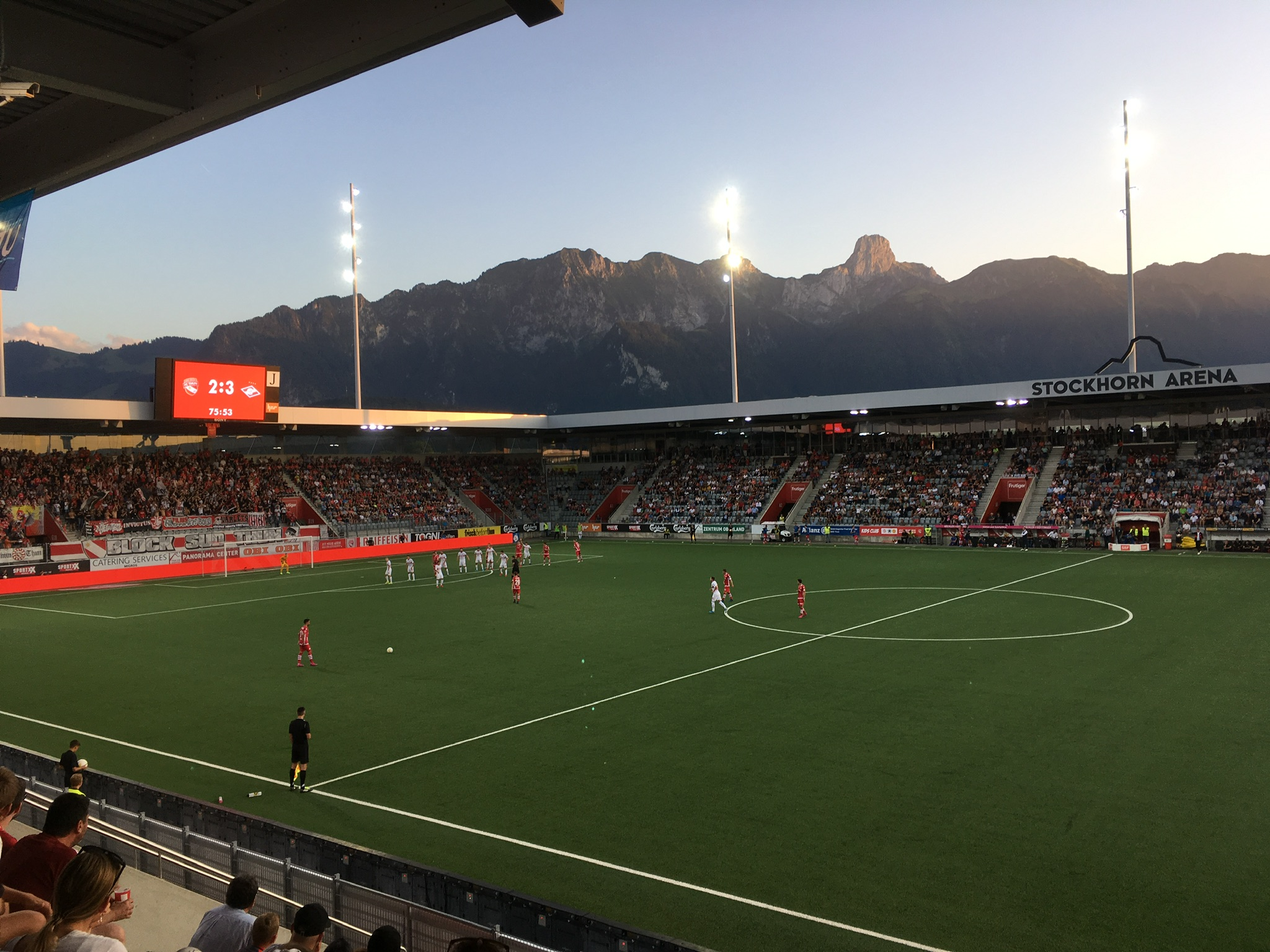
Inside the Stockhorn Arena

From 1945 until 2011, FC Thun played their home matches at Stadion Lachen. The stadium held 10,350 fans in a mixture of standing and seating. FC Thun played their final game at Lachen in May 2011, beating AC Bellinzona 3–1.

In 2005, when FC Thun qualified for the Champions League, they were required to use the Stade de Suisse in Bern.

In 2006, the citizens of Thun refused to finance a new stadium with public funds, leaving FC Thun needing to find alternative investment or risk no longer being eligible to play professional football. A private contractor offered to build the stadium with construction work beginning in spring 2010. The stadium would feature a shopping mall. The new stadium – at that time called Arena Thun – was officially inaugurated on 9 July 2011, with a friendly match between 1. FC Köln and FC Thun. Köln's striker Milivoje Novaković was the first player to score in the new arena, and the game ended in a tie (2:2). In 2014, Stockhornbahn AG (which runs an aerial cableway to the Stockhorn) began sponsorship of the stadium, which became known as the Stockhorn Arena.

== Current squad ==
As of 8 September 2026

Note: Flags indicate national team as defined under FIFA eligibility rules; some limited exceptions apply. Players may hold more than one non-FIFA nationality.

No.	Pos.	Nation	Player
1	GK	SUI	Niklas Steffen
2	DF	SUI	Olivier Mambwa (on loan from Young Boys)
4	DF	ESP	Genís Montolio
5	DF	SUI	Nicolas Bürgy
8	MF	SUI	Fabio Saiz
9	FW	AUT	Furkan Dursun
13	MF	SUI	Nassim Zoukit
14	MF	EST	Mattias Käit
15	MF	EST	Patrik Kristal (on loan from 1. FC Köln)
16	MF	SUI	Justin Roth
17	DF	SUI	Ashvin Balaruban
18	MF	SWE	Tom Strannegård
19	DF	SUI	Jan Bamert
20	FW	ITA	Riccardo Braschi
21	MF	SUI	Dorian Derbaci

No.	Pos.	Nation	Player
22	GK	SUI	Dario Wälti
23	DF	SUI	Marco Bürki (captain)
24	DF	SUI	Mats Seiler
25	GK	SUI	Tim Spycher
26	FW	SWE	Noah Christoffersson
30	MF	SUI	Nico Maier
33	FW	SUI	Marc Gutbub
34	GK	SUI	Leo Stucki
37	DF	SUI	Lucien Dähler
47	DF	SUI	Fabio Fehr
52	MF	SUI	Adam Ilić
54	DF	SUI	Louis Passavant
70	MF	CHI	Nils Reichmuth
80	FW	SUI	Simon Lengen
96	FW	MTQ	Brighton Labeau

== European record ==
=== UEFA club competition record ===
- Q= Qualifying
- PO = Play-off

Season	Competition	Round	Club	Home	Away	Aggregate
2005–06	UEFA Champions League	Q2	(Ukraine) Dynamo Kyiv	1–0	2–2	3–2
2005–06	UEFA Champions League	Q3	(Sweden) Malmö FF	3–0	1–0	4–0
2005–06	UEFA Champions League	Group B	(England) Arsenal	0–1	1–2	3rd
2005–06	UEFA Champions League	Group B	(Czech Republic) Sparta Prague	1–0	0–0	3rd
2005–06	UEFA Champions League	Group B	(Netherlands) Ajax	2–4	0–2	3rd
2005–06	UEFA Cup	R32	(Germany) Hamburger SV	1–0	0–2	1–2
2011–12	UEFA Europa League	Q2	(Albania) Vllaznia	2–1	0–0	2–1
2011–12	UEFA Europa League	Q3	(Italy) Palermo	1–1	2–2	3–3 (a.)
2011–12	UEFA Europa League	PO	(England) Stoke City	0–1	1–4	1–5
2013–14	UEFA Europa League	Q2	(Georgia (country)) Chikhura Sachkhere	2–0	3–1	5–1
2013–14	UEFA Europa League	Q3	(Sweden) Häcken	1–0	2–1	3–1
2013–14	UEFA Europa League	PO	(Serbia) Partizan	3–0	0–1	3–1
2013–14	UEFA Europa League	Group G	(Ukraine) Dynamo Kyiv	0–2	0–3	4th
2013–14	UEFA Europa League	Group G	(Belgium) Genk	0–1	1–2	4th
2013–14	UEFA Europa League	Group G	(Austria) Rapid Wien	1–0	1–2	4th
2015–16	UEFA Europa League	Q2	(Israel) Hapoel Be'er Sheva	2–1	1–1	3–2
2015–16	UEFA Europa League	Q3	(Liechtenstein) Vaduz	0–0	2–2	2–2 (a.)
2015–16	UEFA Europa League	PO	(Czech Republic) Sparta Prague	3–3	1–3	4–6
2019–20	UEFA Europa League	Q3	(Russia) Spartak Moscow	2–3	1–2	3–5
2026–27	UEFA Champions League	2QR	(Croatia) Dinamo Zagreb	1–1	2−3 (a.e.t.)	3–4
2026–27	UEFA Europa League	3QR	(Iceland) Víkingur Reykjavík	3–0	2–3	5–3
2026–27	UEFA Europa League	PO	(Poland) Lech Poznań	2–2	0–7	2–9
2026–27	UEFA Conference League	LP	(Netherlands) Ajax	—N/a		
2026–27	UEFA Conference League	LP	(Belgium) Gent		—N/a	
2026–27	UEFA Conference League	LP	(Netherlands) Twente	—N/a	0–1	
2026–27	UEFA Conference League	LP	(Scotland) Heart of Midlothian	3–1	—N/a	
2026–27	UEFA Conference League	LP	(Croatia) Hajduk Split	0–1	—N/a	
2026–27	UEFA Conference League	LP	(Bulgaria) CSKA Sofia	—N/a		

== Former coaches ==
- (Switzerland) Hans Luder (1946–48)
- (Switzerland) Hans Pulver (1948–49)
- (England) Jimmy Townley (1949–50)
- (Switzerland) Hans Luder (1953–54)
- (Switzerland) Hans Luder/ (Austria) Hermann Czischek (1954–56)
- (Austria) Hermann Czischek (1956–58)
- (Germany) Alfred "Coppi" Beck (1958–62)
- (Switzerland) Hermann Jucker (1962–63)
- (Germany) Matthias Rossbach (1963–67)
- (Switzerland) Heinz Schneiter (1967–69)
- (Germany) Lothar Weise (1969–70)
- (Czech Republic) Miroslav Patak (1971–72)
- (Switzerland) Fridolin Hofer (1972–73)
- (Switzerland) René Raboud (1973–74)
- (Switzerland) Hanspeter Latour (1978–83)
- (Switzerland) Otto Messerli (1984–86)
- (Switzerland) Martin Trümpler (1986–90)
- (Switzerland) Willi Kaufmann (1990–92)
- (Switzerland) Peter Mast (1992–93)
- (Switzerland) Stefan Marini (1994–95)
- (Switzerland) Andy Egli (1 July 1995 – 31 December 1998)
- (Switzerland) Georges Bregy (1 Jan 1999 – 30 June 2001)
- (Switzerland) Hanspeter Latour (1 July 2001 – 31 December 2004)
- (Switzerland) Urs Schönenberger (1 Jan 2005 – 13 February 2006)
- (Switzerland) Adrian Kunz (interim) (13 Feb 2006 – 15 February 2006)
- (Austria) Heinz Peischl (14 Feb 2006 – 6 March 2007)
- (Luxembourg) Jeff Saibene (6 March 2007 – 5 June 2007)
- (Netherlands) René van Eck (1 July 2007 – 30 June 2008)
- (Switzerland) Hansruedi Baumann (1 July 2008 – 12 May 2009)
- (Switzerland) Eric-Pi Zuercher (2009)
- (Switzerland) Andres Gerber (interim) (12 May 2009 – 30 June 2009)
- (Switzerland) Murat Yakin (1 July 2009 – 30 June 2011)
- (Switzerland) Bernard Challandes (1 July 2011 – 20 November 2012)
- (Switzerland) Mauro Lustrinelli (interim) (21 Nov 2012 – 31 December 2012)
- (Switzerland) Urs Fischer (1 Jan 2013 – June 2015)
- (Switzerland) Ciriaco Sforza (26 July 2015 – 30 September 2015)
- (Luxembourg) Jeff Saibene (1 October 2015 –19 March 2017)
- (Switzerland) Mauro Lustrinelli (interim) (27 Mar 2017 – 30 June 2017)
- (Switzerland) Marc Schneider (1 Jul 2017 – 5 October 2020)
- (Switzerland) Pascal Cerrone (interim) (5 October 2020 – 10 October 2020)
- (Argentina) Carlos Bernegger (11 October 2020 – 30 June 2022)
- (Switzerland) Mauro Lustrinelli (1 July 2022 – 30 June 2026)

== Honours ==
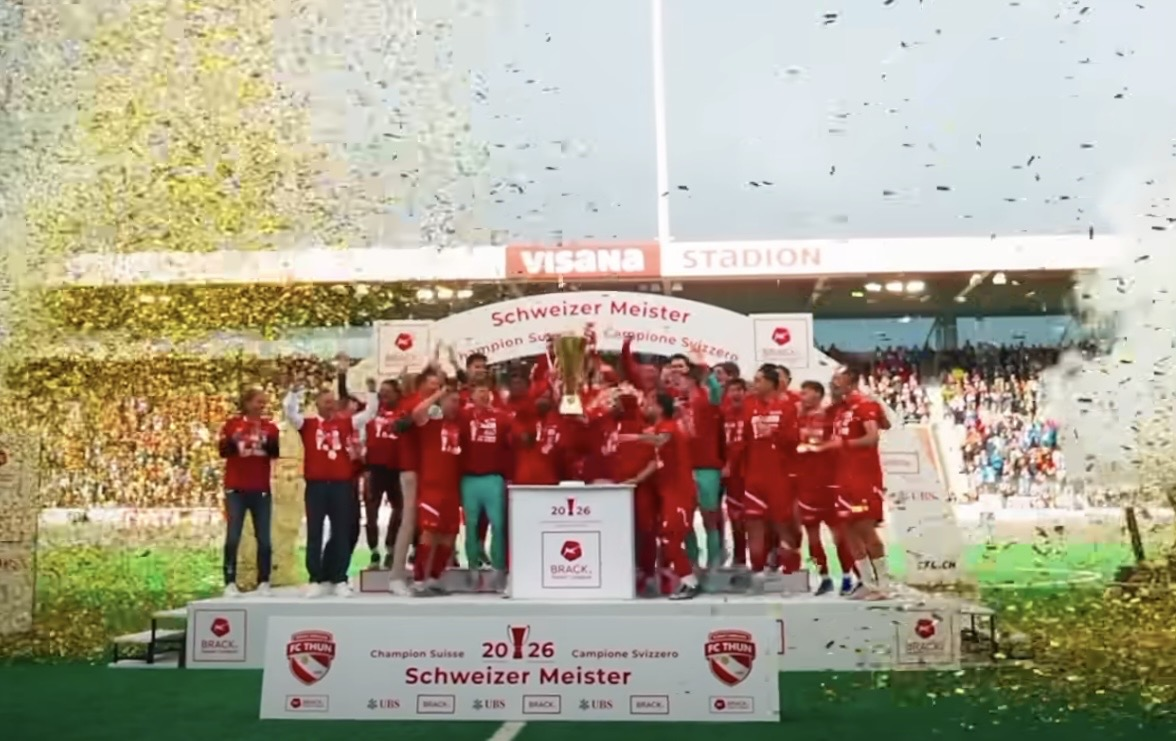
FC Thun being crowned champions of the 2025-26 Swiss Super League on 3 May 2026

- Swiss Super League
  - Champions: 2025–26
  - Runners-up: 2004–05
- Swiss Challenge League/Nationalliga B
  - Champions: 2009–10, 2024–25
  - Promoted: 1953–54, 2001–02
- Swiss Cup
  - Runners-up: 1954–55, 2018–19
