= 2024–25 Swiss Challenge League =

Swiss Challenge League
- Season: 2024–25
- Dates: 19 July 2024 – 23 May 2025
- Champions: Thun (2nd title)
- Promoted: Thun
- Relegated: Schaffhausen
- UEFA Conference League: Vaduz
- Matches: 180
- Top goalscorer: Oscar Correia (9 goals)
- Biggest home win: 7–0; Étoile Carouge–Bellinzona (5 Apr '25)
- Biggest away win: 1–6; Nyon–Thun (1 Nov '24)
- Highest scoring: 6–2; SLO–Nyon (8 Nov '24); Xamax–Schaffhausen (31 Mar '25)
- All statistics correct as of 5 December 2023.

The 2024–25 Swiss Challenge League (referred to as the Dieci Challenge League for sponsoring reasons) is the 127th season of the second tier of competitive football in Switzerland and the 22nd season under its current name.

== Schedule ==
The Swiss Football League (SFL) released a detailed schedule on 5 December 2023. The season will begin on 19 July 2024 and conclude on 23 May 2025. The league will go on winter break after matchday 18 on 15 December 2024 and resume on 24 January 2025. The final matchday of the relegation group will take place on, while the championship group will hold its last matches. The two legs of the promotion play-offs are scheduled for 27 and 30 May 2025, while the relegation play-off will be held on 26 and 29 May 2025.

== Teams ==
On May 11 2024, Étoile Carouge returned to the Challenge League after a 12 year absence. On May 15, 2024, FC Stade Lausanne-Ouchy, relegated from the Super League, returned to the second series after a one year absence. They replace last season's Challenge League champions FC Sion, who returned to the top flight after a 1 year absence, and FC Baden, who were relegated to the Swiss Promotion League after just one season in the Challenge League.

=== Team changes ===
Promoted from 2023–24 Swiss Promotion League	Relegated from 2023–24 Swiss Super League
Étoile Carouge	FC Stade Lausanne Ouchy

=== Stadia and locations ===
Locations of clubs in the 2024-25 Swiss Challenge League teams

Team	Location	Stadium	Capacity	Ref
FC Aarau	Aarau	Stadion Brügglifeld	8,000	
AC Bellinzona	Bellinzona	Stadio Comunale	5,000	
Étoile Carouge FC	Carouge	Stade de la Fontenette	3,600	
FC Stade Lausanne-Ouchy	Lausanne	Stade Olympique (Note: Stade-Lausanne-Ouchy's home stadium Stade Juan-Antonio-Samaranch in Lausanne can not accommodate SLO for the Challenge League. SLO will play at the Stade Olympique de la Pontaise in Lausanne.)	15,850	
FC Stade Nyonnais	Nyon	Stade de Colovray	7,200	
FC Schaffhausen	Schaffhausen	FCS Arena	8,200	
FC Thun	Thun	Stockhorn Arena	10,014	
FC Vaduz	(Liechtenstein) Vaduz	Rheinpark Stadion	7,584	
FC Wil 1900	Wil	Lidl Arena	6,958	
Neuchâtel Xamax FCS	Neuchâtel	Stade de la Maladière	11,997	

No. of teams	Cantons	Team(s)
2
2	Vaud	Nyon, Lausanne Ouchy
1
1	Aargau	Aarau
1	Bern	Thun
1	Liechtenstein	Vaduz
1	Schaffhausen	Schaffhausen
1	St. Gallen	Wil
1	Geneva	Étoile Carouge
1	Neuchâtel	Xamax
1	Ticino	Bellinzona

=== Personnel and kits ===
Team	Manager	Captain	Kit manufacturer	Shirt sponsor
Aarau	(Switzerland) Brunello Iacopetta	(Switzerland) Olivier Jäckle	gpard	Credit Suisse
Bellinzona	(Italy) Giuseppe Sannino	(Switzerland) Dragan Mihajlović	Acerbis	
Étoile Carouge	(Romania) Adrian Ursea	(Switzerland) Aurélien Chappuis	SB Sport	Raiffeisen
Lausanne Ouchy	(Slovenia) Dalibor Stevanović	(France) Rayan Kadima	14fourteen	gerofinance
Schaffhausen	(Switzerland) Hakan Yakin	(Albania) Ermir Lenjani	Puma	Methabau
Nyon	(Switzerland) Andrea Binotto	(Switzerland) Quentin Gaillard	Adidas	
Thun	(Switzerland) Mauro Lustrinelli	(Switzerland) Marco Bürki	Macron	Schneider Software AG
Vaduz	(Switzerland) Marc Schneider	(Liechtenstein) Benjamin Büchel	Puma	MBPI
Wil	(Switzerland) Marco Hämmerli	(Switzerland) Kastrijot Ndau	Adidas	Weber und Partner AG; LIKA Group AG
Xamax	(France) Anthony Braizat	(Slovenia) Kenan Fatkič	Puma	groupe e

=== Managerial changes ===
Team	Outgoing manager	Manner of departure	Date of departure	Position in table	Incoming manager	Date of appointment	Ref.
Schaffhausen	(Germany) Christian Wimmer	End of contract	19 May 2024	Pre-season	(Switzerland) Ciriaco Sforza	15 June 2024	
Aarau	(Bosnia and Herzegovina) Ranko Jakovljević (interim)	End of interim period	20 May 2024	Pre-season	(Switzerland) Brunello Iacopetta	20 May 2024	
Wil	(Switzerland) Brunello Iacopetta	Mutual consent	24 May 2024	Pre-season	(Switzerland) Marco Hämmerli	24 May 2024	
Lausanne Ouchy	(Portugal) Ricardo Dionísio	Mutual consent	25 September 2024	9th	(Slovenia) Dalibor Stevanović	25 September 2024	
Xamax	(Switzerland) Uli Forte	Mutual consent	24 December 2024	6th	(France) Anthony Braizat	24 December 2024	
Nyon	(France) Christophe Caschili	Termination	16 December 2024	8th	(Switzerland) Andrea Binotto	2 January 2025	
Schaffhausen	(Switzerland) Ciriaco Sforza	Termination	4 March 2025	10th	(Switzerland) Hakan Yakin	4 March 2025	
Bellinzona	(Spain) Manuel Benavente	Termination	18 March 2025	9th	(Italy) Giuseppe Sannino	20 March 2025	

== Table ==
Pos	Team	Pld	W	D	L	GF	GA	GD	Pts	Promotion, qualification or relegation
1	Thun (C, P)	36	21	9	6	70	39	+31	72	Promotion to Swiss Super League
2	Aarau (Q)	36	16	13	7	63	45	+18	61	Qualification for promotion play-off
3	Étoile Carouge	36	15	9	12	57	46	+11	54	
4	Lausanne Ouchy	36	14	11	11	54	43	+11	53	
5	Wil	36	14	11	11	60	55	+5	53	
6	Vaduz	36	13	12	11	48	49	−1	51	Qualification for Conference League second qualifying round (Note: Vaduz qualified for the Conference League second qualifying round by winning the 2024–25 Liechtenstein Cup.)
7	Bellinzona (Note: Bellinzona were deducted 3 points on 16 December 2024 (confirmed on 22 January 2025), for failing to report social contribution payments. This decision was partially overturned by CAS on 25 April 2025 (Bellinzona are still fined SFr 30,000).)	36	11	11	14	47	60	−13	44	
8	Xamax	36	12	5	19	57	65	−8	41	
9	Nyon	36	10	6	20	44	69	−25	36	
10	Schaffhausen (R)	36	7	7	22	40	69	−29	25 (Note: Schaffhausen were deducted 3 points on 26 February 2025 (confirmed on 25 March 2025), for failing to report social contribution payments.)	Relegation to Swiss Promotion League

Source: Swiss Challenge League
Rules for classification: 1) Points; 2) Goal difference; 3) Goals scored; 4) Head-to-head goal difference; 5) Head-to-head goals scored 6) Away goals scored; 7) Draw.
(C) Champions; (P) Promoted; (Q) Qualified for the phase indicated; (R) Relegated

== Results ==
=== First and second rounds ===
Home \ Away	AAR	BEL	ETC	SLO	NYO	SHA	THU	VAD	WIL	XAM
Aarau	—	1–2	1–0	1–0	1–0	1–2	1–3	0–0	1–1	1–3
Bellinzona	1–4	—	1–1	2–1	1–1	2–1	0–0	1–2	0–3 (Note: On 12 August 2024, Bellinzona were sanctioned with a 0–3 forfeit loss, as they fielded eight non-locally trained players, instead of the allowed seven, in this match. This decision was confirmed on 17 September 2024, following appeal by Bellinzona.)	0–2
Étoile Carouge	2–1	2–2	—	1–1	3–1	1–0	0–2	1–0	3–1	3–1
Lausanne Ouchy	1–1	1–1	5–1	—	6–2	0–1	1–1	2–2	0–0	1–2
Nyon	1–2	2–1	2–4	0–3	—	0–3	1–6	1–1	3–1	2–1
Schaffhausen	0–3	2–1	2–3	0–1	0–1	—	2–2	1–1	0–2	1–2
Thun	1–1	1–2	2–1	1–1	3–0	3–1	—	2–0	0–2	1–0
Vaduz	2–5	2–1	3–2	3–1	0–0	2–2	2–0	—	3–2	2–1
Wil	2–2	0–2	2–1	2–2	0–3	2–2	0–0	0–0	—	4–0
Xamax	1–3	2–2	0–3	3–2	3–2	2–1	2–3	4–1	1–4	—

Source: Swiss Football League
Legend: Blue = home team win; Yellow = draw; Red = away team win.

=== Third and fourth rounds ===
Home \ Away	AAR	BEL	ETC	SLO	NYO	SHA	THU	VAD	WIL	XAM
Aarau	—	2–1	2–2	2–2	1–1	3–0	1–0	2–2	2–4	2–0
Bellinzona	1–1	—	0–0	0–1	2–1	3–0	3–1	3–1	0–3	3–1
Étoile Carouge	1–3	7–0	—	1–2	2–1	0–2	0–0	3–2	1–1	2–1
Lausanne Ouchy	2–4	1–1	1–0	—	0–1	0–1	3–0	2–0	2–1	0–0
Nyon	1–2	3–0	0–3	3–0	—	0–1	0–2	1–0	0–2	1–3
Schaffhausen	1–1	1–3	0–0	2–3	2–3	—	2–3	1–1	1–3	2–4
Thun	2–1	2–0	1–0	2–1	2–2	3–0	—	3–1	7–0	2–1
Vaduz	0–1	3–1	1–0	0–1	1–1	1–0	3–3	—	1–0	2–1
Wil	2–2	2–2	2–2	0–2	2–1	3–1	2–3	0–3	—	2–0
Xamax	1–1	1–1	1–2	1–2	4–0	6–2	0–2	0–0	2–3	—

Source: Swiss Football League
Legend: Blue = home team win; Yellow = draw; Red = away team win.

== Promotion play-off ==
The relegation play-off was played in a two-legged game between the eleventh placed team of the Super League (5th of the relegation group) and the second placed team of the Challenge League. The two legs of the relegation play-offs were scheduled for 27 and 30 May 2025, respectively. On 28 March 2025, it was decided by draw that the representative of the Super League will host the first match.

The winner of the play-off was whichever team scored more goals over both games (no away goals rule). In case of a tie at the end of the two games, 30 minutes of extra time (two times 15 minutes) were added, followed by a penalty shoot-out, in case the teams were still tied.

=== First leg ===
27 May 2025
20:30 CEST (UTC+2)

Grasshopper	4–0	Aarau
Young-jun 14'; Schürpf 41'; Muci 79'; Seko 86' (pen.)	Report

Stadio Cornaredo, Lugano (Note: Grasshoppers's home game will be played in Lugano, due to the Letzigrund being unavailable on the dates of the play-off.)
Attendance: 3,800
Referee: Urs Schnyder

=== Second leg ===
30 May 2025
20:30 CEST (UTC+2)

Aarau	1:0	Grasshopper
Obexer 82'	Report

Stadion Brügglifeld, Aarau
