= 2022–23 FC Vaduz season =

FC Vaduz
2022–23 season
- Chairman: Patrick Burgmeier
- Manager: Alessandro Mangiarratti
- Stadium: Rheinpark Stadion
- Swiss Challenge League: 8th
- Liechtenstein Cup: Winners
- UEFA Europa Conference League: Group stage
- Top goalscorer: League: Tunahan Cicek (12); All: Tunahan Cicek (16)
Home colours

The 2022–23 season was the 91st season in the history of FC Vaduz and their second consecutive season in the Swiss Challenge League. The season covered the period from 1 July 2022 to 30 June 2023.

Vaduz became the first club from Liechtenstein to play in a UEFA tournament group stage.

== Players ==
As of 6 September 2022

Note: Flags indicate national team as defined under FIFA eligibility rules; some limited exceptions apply. Players may hold more than one non-FIFA nationality.

No.	Pos.	Nation	Player
1	GK	LIE	Benjamin Büchel (Captain)
3	DF	FRA	Anthony Goelzer
4	MF	LIE	Nicolas Hasler
5	DF	AUT	Anes Omerovic
6	DF	KOS	Fuad Rahimi
7	MF	SUI	Merlin Hadzi
8	MF	LIE	Sandro Wieser
9	FW	AUT	Manuel Sutter
10	MF	SUI	Tunahan Cicek
13	DF	SUI	Kevin Iodice
14	MF	SRB	Milan Gajić
17	MF	SUI	Joël Ris
19	FW	SUI	Dejan Djokic
20	MF	LIE	Simon Lüchinger

No.	Pos.	Nation	Player
21	DF	KOS	Arbenit Xhemajli
23	DF	SUI	Dario Ulrich
24	MF	SUI	Cédric Gasser
25	GK	LIE	Gabriel Foser
27	FW	NGR	Franklin Sasere
28	DF	LIE	Lars Traber
29	DF	GER	Gabriel Isik
42	GK	MOZ	Gion Chande
47	DF	SUI	Fabio Fehr
53	MF	KOS	Gezim Pepsi
74	FW	SUI	Elmin Rastoder (on loan from Grasshoppers)
77	MF	AUT	Kristijan Dobras
80	MF	SUI	Ryan Fosso

=== Out on loan ===
Note: Flags indicate national team as defined under FIFA eligibility rules; some limited exceptions apply. Players may hold more than one non-FIFA nationality.

No.	Pos.	Nation	Player
—	GK	LIE	Justin Ospelt (at Dornbirn until 30 June 2023)
—	DF	SUI	Giosue Capozzi (at Brühl until 30 June 2023)

No.	Pos.	Nation	Player
—	FW	AUT	Elvin Ibrisimovic (at Dornbirn until 30 June 2023)

== Pre-season and friendlies ==
Win Draw Loss

24 June 2022 Friendly	Vaduz (Liechtenstein)	0–2	(Germany) SC Freiburg II	Vaduz
15:30 CEST (UTC+2)				Stadium: Rheinpark Stadion

28 June 2022 Friendly	Vaduz (Liechtenstein)	1–1	(Switzerland) Winterthur	Sevelen
19:00 CEST (UTC+2)				Stadium: Sportanlage FC Sevelen

2 July 2022 Friendly	Luzern (Switzerland)	4–1	(Liechtenstein) Vaduz	Grosswangen
16:00 CEST (UTC+2)	Sorgić 32'; Schürpf 35'; Campo 50'; Burch 88'	Report	Rastoder 72'	Stadium: Fussballplatz Gutmoos

9 July 2022 Friendly	Vaduz (Liechtenstein)	3–1	(Austria) FC Dornbirn	Vaduz
11:00 CEST (UTC+2)				Stadium: Rheinpark Stadion

14 January 2023 Friendly	Thun (Switzerland)	v	(Liechtenstein) Vaduz	Bern, Switzerland
11:00 CET (UTC+1)				Stadium: Stadion Wankdorf

14 January 2023 Friendly	Young Boys (Switzerland)	0–0	(Liechtenstein) Vaduz	Bern, Switzerland
14:00 CET (UTC+1)				Stadium: Stadion Wankdorf

18 January 2023 Friendly	Sturm Graz (Austria)	2–1	(Liechtenstein) Vaduz	Side, Turkey
14:00 CET (UTC+1)				Stadium: Arslan Zeki Demirci Spor Kompleksi 2 Nolu Saha

20 January 2023 Friendly	Vaduz (Liechtenstein)	2–1	(Uzbekistan) Pakhtakor	Belek, Turkey
15:00 CET (UTC+1)				Stadium: Titanic Sports Center - Field 1

23 March 2023 Friendly	Austria Lustenau	2–1	(Liechtenstein) Vaduz	Lustenau, Austria
11:00 CET (UTC+1)				Stadium: Reichshofstadion

== Competitions ==
=== Overall record ===
Competition	First match	Last match	Starting round	Final position	Record							
Competition	First match	Last match	Starting round	Final position	Pld	W	D	L	GF	GA	GD	Win %
Swiss Challenge League	15 July 2022	May 2023	Matchday 1	8th	36	7	16	13	54	56	−2	19.44
Liechtenstein Cup	31 August 2022		Round of 16	Winners	4	4	0	0	32	1	+31	100.00
UEFA Europa Conference League	21 July 2022	3 November 2022	Second qualifying round	Group stage	12	3	5	4	14	16	−2	25.00
Total					52	14	21	17	100	73	+27	26.92

Source: Soccerway

=== Swiss Challenge League ===
==== League table ====
Pos	Team	Pld	W	D	L	GF	GA	GD	Pts	Promotion or qualification
6	Thun	36	12	13	11	62	55	+7	49	
7	Schaffhausen	36	12	8	16	51	59	−8	44	
8	Vaduz	36	7	16	13	54	56	−2	37	Qualification for the Europa Conference League first qualifying round (Note: Vaduz qualified for the Europa Conference League first qualifying round by winning the 2022–23 Liechtenstein Cup.)
9	Bellinzona	36	11	4	21	38	71	−33	37	
10	Xamax (O)	36	4	12	20	42	65	−23	24	Qualification for the relegation play-off

Source: Swiss Challenge League
Rules for classification: 1) Points; 2) Goal difference; 3) Goals scored; 4) Head-to-head goal difference; 5) Away goals scored; 6) Draw.
(O) Play-off winners

==== Results summary ====
Overall								Home						Away					
Pld	W	D	L	GF	GA	GD	Pts	W	D	L	GF	GA	GD	W	D	L	GF	GA	GD
36	7	16	13	54	56	−2	37	3	8	7	23	30	−7	4	8	6	31	26	+5

Source: Swiss Challenge League

==== Results by round ====
Round	1	2	3	4	5	6	7	8	9	10	11	12	13	14	15	16	17	18	19	20	21	22	23	24	25	26	27	28	29	30	31	32	33	34	35	36
Ground	A	H	A	H	H	A	H	A	H	A	H	A	H	A	H	A	H	A	H	A	H	A	H	A	H	A	A	H	A	H	H	A	H	A	H	A
Result	D	D	L	L	L	L	D	D	L	D	W	W	D	L	D	L	W	D	D	L	L	D	L	D	W	D	W	L	W	D	D	D	L	L	D	W
Position	5	8	8	8	9	9	9	9	9	9	9	9	9	9	9	9	8	9	9	9	9	9	9	9	9	9	8	9	8	8	8	8	9	9	9	8

Source: Swiss Challenge League
A = Away; H = Home; W = Win; D = Draw; L = Loss

==== Matches ====
15 July 2022 1	FC Aarau	1–1	Vaduz
	Vladi 10'	Report	Djokic 83'

24 July 2022 2	Vaduz	3–3	Yverdon-Sport FC
	Cicek 3', 90' (pen.); Malula 84' (o.g.)	Report	Koné 21', 68'; Fargues 41'

31 July 2022 3	FC Wil	2–0	Vaduz
	Beka 84'; Bahloul 90'	Report

7 August 2022 4	Vaduz	2–3	AC Bellinzona
	Ulrich 48'; Hadzi 66'	Report	Maniş 19'; Pollero 34', 88'

14 August 2022 5	Vaduz	2–4	FC Thun
	Hadzi 59'; Cicek 79'	Report	Kyeremateng 18', 68'; Sutter 82'; Castroman 90'

28 August 2022 6	FC Lausanne-Sport	3–1	Vaduz
	Coyle 30'; Labeau 60', 79'	Report	Hadzi 90'

4 September 2022 7	Vaduz	1–1	FC Schaffhausen
	Cicek 24'	Report	Gajić 74' (o.g.)

11 September 2022 8	Neuchâtel Xamax FCS	1–1	Vaduz
	Nuzzolo 44' (pen.)	Report	Gasser 67'

2 October 2022 9	Vaduz	0–2	FC Stade Lausanne Ouchy
		Report	Ajdini 39', 52'

9 October 2022 10	FC Schaffhausen	2–2	Vaduz
	Bobadilla 35'; Lika 42'	Report	Djokic 77'; Hadzi 82' (pen.)

16 October 2022 11	Vaduz	4–0	FC Aarau
	Rastoder 4', 33'; Cicek 13', 27'	Report

19 October 2022 12	FC Stade Lausanne Ouchy	1–5	FC Vaduz
	Danho 80'	Report	Hasler 2', 10'; Djokić 64'; Xhemajli 73'; Dobras 76' (pen.)

23 October 2022 13	FC Vaduz	0–0	FC Wil
		Report

30 October 2022 14	AC Bellinzona	2–0	FC Vaduz
	G.Padula 4'; Chacón 10'	Report

6 November 2022 15	FC Vaduz	1–1	Neuchâtel Xamax FCS
	Cicek 14' (pen.)	Report	Berisha 46'

11 November 2022 16	Yverdon-Sport FC	3–1	FC Vaduz
	Silva 69'; Vishi 85'; Thioune 90'	Report	Djokić 89'

20 November 2022 17	FC Vaduz	1–0	FC Lausanne-Sport
	Rastoder 49'	Report

26 November 2022 18	FC Thun	1–1	FC Vaduz
	Oberlin 85' (pen.)	Report	Rastoder 61'

27 January 2023 19	FC Vaduz	2–2	FC Wil
	Goelzer 79'; Cicek 86'	Report	Muci 49'; Lukembila 60'

3 February 2023 20	FC Schaffhausen	1–0	FC Vaduz
	Vogt 90'	Report

12 February 2023 21	FC Vaduz	0–3	FC Thun
		Report	Dos Santos 8'; Kyeremateng 67', 89'

17 February 2023 22	Yverdon-Sport FC	2–2	FC Vaduz
	Beyer 49', 85'	Report	Omerovic 51'; Fehr 90'

26 February 2023 23	FC Vaduz	1–2	Neuchâtel Xamax FCS
	Djokic 17'	Report	Havenaar 38'; Del Toro 75'

5 March 2023 24	FC Lausanne-Sport	0–0	FC Vaduz
		Report

12 March 2023 25	FC Vaduz	2–1	AC Bellinzona
	Dobras 73'; Sasere 90'	Report	Cortelezzi 26'

18 March 2023 26	FC Stade Lausanne Ouchy	0–0	FC Vaduz
		Report

2 April 2023 27	FC Aarau	0–2	FC Vaduz
		Report	Fehr 85'; Rastoder 90'

10 April 2023 28	FC Vaduz	1–4	FC Schaffhausen
	Rastoder 78'	Report	Vogt 24', 53'; Bobadilla 27'; Navarro 76'

16 April 2023 29	AC Bellinzona	1–6	FC Vaduz
	Samba 48'	Report	Cicek 7' (pen.), 11', 65' (pen.); Hasler 16'; Sasere 20' (pen.); Sutter 61'

23 April 2023 30	FC Vaduz	1–1	FC Lausanne-Sport
	Xhemajli 87'	Report	Labeau 48'

30 April 2023 31	FC Vaduz	0–0	Yverdon-Sport FC
		Report

7 May 2023 32	FC Thun	3–3	FC Vaduz
	Väyrynen 26' (o.g.); Matoshi 30'; Bertone 37'	Report	Cicek 15'; Djokic 17'; Wyssen 76' (o.g.)

14 May 2023 33	FC Vaduz	0–1	FC Aarau
		Report	Fazliu 64'

20 May 2023 34	FC Wil	2–0	FC Vaduz
	Muci 18'; Bahloul 72'	Report

23 May 2023 35	FC Vaduz	2–2	FC Stade Lausanne Ouchy
	Rastoder 60'; Fosso 90'	Report	Ajdini 49'; Mulaj 76' (pen.)

27 May 2023 36	Neuchâtel Xamax FCS	1–6	FC Vaduz
	Ouhafsa 54'	Report	Sasere 3', 38', 48', 63'; Isik 44'; Fehr 56'

=== Liechtenstein Cup ===
31 August 2022 Round of 16	FC Triesen II	0–18	Vaduz
			Rastoder 15', 37', 66'; Hasler 17'; Pepsi 19', 57'; Djokić 23', 27', 43', 69'; Ris 33'; Omerovic 50', 88'; Fosso 53', 71', 86'; Hadzi 65'; Goelzer 73'

20 September 2022 Quarter-finals	USV Eschen/Mauren III	0–8	Vaduz
		Report	Omerovic 10'; Fosso 28', 37'; Djokić 33', 42', 49'; Rastoder 68'; Fehr 89'

5 April 2023 Semi-finals	USV Eschen/Mauren	1–2 (a.e.t.)	Vaduz
	Shabani 119'	Report	Sasere 105' (pen.), 109'

17 May 2023 Final	Vaduz	4–0	FC Balzers
	Gasser 41'; Cicek 70' (pen.); Traber 77'; Väyrynen 88'	Report

=== UEFA Europa Conference League ===
==== Second qualifying round ====
The draw for the second qualifying round was held on 15 June 2022.

21 July 2022 First leg	Koper (Slovenia)	0–1	(Liechtenstein) Vaduz	Koper, Slovenia
18:00 CEST (UTC+2)		Report	Cicek 53'	Stadium: Bonifika Stadium; Attendance: 860; Referee: Gergő Bogár (Hungary)

28 July 2022 Second leg	Vaduz (Liechtenstein)	1–1 (a.e.t.) (2–1 agg.)	(Slovenia) Koper	Vaduz, Liechtenstein
20:00 CEST (UTC+2)	Sasere 101'	Report	Kotnik 88'	Stadium: Rheinpark Stadion; Attendance: 743; Referee: Besfort Kasumi (Kosovo)

==== Third qualifying round ====
The draw for the third qualifying round was held on 18 July 2022.

4 August 2022 First leg	Vaduz (Liechtenstein)	1–1	(Turkey) Konyaspor	Vaduz, Liechtenstein
20:00 CEST (UTC+2)	Sasere 72'	Report	Demir 88'	Stadium: Rheinpark Stadion; Attendance: 2,032; Referee: Manfredas Lukjančukas (Lithuania)

11 August 2022 Second leg	Konyaspor (Turkey)	2–4 (3–5 agg.)	(Liechtenstein) Vaduz	Konya, Turkey
20:00 TRT (UTC+3)	Guilherme 18' (pen.); Hadžiahmetović 90+5'	Report	Gasser 28', 89'; Sutter 31'; Cicek 67'	Stadium: Konya Metropolitan Municipality Stadium; Attendance: 22,723; Referee: Guillermo Cuadra Fernández (Spain)

==== Play-off round ====
The draw for the play-off round was held on 2 August 2022.

18 August 2022 First leg	Vaduz (Liechtenstein)	1–1	(Austria) Rapid Wien	Vaduz, Liechtenstein
20:00 CEST (UTC+2)	Ulrich 10'	Report	Druijf 53'	Stadium: Rheinpark Stadion; Attendance: 3,497; Referee: Kristo Tohver (Estonia)

25 August 2022 Second leg	Rapid Wien (Austria)	0–1 (1–2 agg.)	(Liechtenstein) Vaduz	Vienna, Austria
21:00 CEST (UTC+2)		Report	Cicek 22'	Stadium: Allianz Stadion; Attendance: 15,100; Referee: Rade Obrenovič (Slovenia)

==== Group stage ====
The draw for the group stage was held on 26 August 2022.

Pos	Team	Pld	W	D	L	GF	GA	GD	Pts	Qualification	AZ	DNI	APL	VAD
1	(Netherlands) AZ	6	5	0	1	12	6	+6	15	Advance to round of 16	—	2–1	3–2	4–1
2	(Ukraine) Dnipro-1	6	3	1	2	9	7	+2	10	Advance to knockout round play-offs	0–1	—	1–0	2–2
3	(Cyprus) Apollon Limassol	6	2	1	3	5	7	−2	7		1–0	1–3	—	1–0
4	(Liechtenstein) Vaduz	6	0	2	4	5	11	−6	2		1–2	1–2	0–0	—

Source: UEFA
Rules for classification: Group stage tiebreakers

8 September 2022 1	Vaduz (Liechtenstein)	0–0	(Cyprus) Apollon Limassol	Vaduz, Liechtenstein
21:00 CEST (UTC+2)		Report		Stadium: Rheinpark Stadion; Attendance: 1,189; Referee: Dumitru Muntean (Moldova)

15 September 2022 2	AZ (Netherlands)	4–1	(Liechtenstein) Vaduz	Alkmaar, Netherlands
18:45 CEST (UTC+2)	Barası 19'; Beukema 81'; Sugawara 90+2'; D. de Wit 90+5'	Report	Goelzer 22'	Stadium: AFAS Stadion; Attendance: 8,523; Referee: Nick Walsh (Scotland)

6 October 2022 3	Dnipro-1 (Ukraine)	2–2	(Liechtenstein) Vaduz	Košice, Slovakia
18:45 CEST (UTC+2)	Dovbyk 5'; Pikhalyonok 78'	Report	Fehr 26'; Gasser 47'	Stadium: Košická futbalová aréna Attendance: 2,050; Referee: Fran Jović (Croatia)
Note: Due to the Russian invasion of Ukraine, Ukrainian teams are required to play their home matches at neutral venues until further notice. Therefore, Dnipro-1 will play their home matches at Košická futbalová aréna, Košice, Slovakia, instead of their regular stadium Dnipro-Arena, Dnipro.

13 October 2022 4	Vaduz (Liechtenstein)	1–2	(Ukraine) Dnipro-1	Vaduz, Liechtenstein
21:00 CEST (UTC+2)	Rastoder 30'	Report	Hamache 25'; Dovbyk 90+1'	Stadium: Rheinpark Stadion; Attendance: 1,131; Referee: Marian Barbu (Romania)

27 October 2022 5	Vaduz (Liechtenstein)	1–2	(Netherlands) AZ	Vaduz, Liechtenstein
18:45 CEST (UTC+2)	Hasler 77'	Report	Kerkez 50'; Van Brederode 75'	Stadium: Rheinpark Stadion; Attendance: 1,949; Referee: Don Robertson (Scotland)

3 November 2022 6	Apollon Limassol (Cyprus)	1–0	(Liechtenstein) Vaduz	Nicosia, Cyprus
19:45 EEST (UTC+3)	Roberge 32'	Report		Stadium: GSP Stadium; Attendance: 712; Referee: Dario Bel (Croatia)
