= 2023–24 AC Bellinzona season =

AC Bellinzona
2023–24 season
- Manager: Sandro Chieffo (until 2 October); Manuel Benavente (from 3 October)
- Stadium: Stadio Comunale Bellinzona
- Swiss Challenge League: 8th
- Swiss Cup: Round 3
- Top goalscorer: League: Rodrigo Pollero (5); All: Rodrigo Pollero (8)
- Biggest win: FC Buchs 0–4 Bellinzona
- Biggest defeat: Bellinzona 0–4 Vaduz

The 2023–24 season was AC Bellinzona's 120th season in existence and ninth consecutive in the Swiss Challenge League. They competed in the Swiss Cup.

== Transfers ==
=== In ===
Pos.	Player	Transferred from	Fee	Date	Source

=== Out ===
Pos.	Player	Transferred to	Fee	Date	Source

== Pre-season and friendlies ==
Win Draw Loss Fixtures

24 June 2023 Friendly	Thun (Switzerland)	2–0	(Switzerland) Bellinzona	Oberdiessbach
14:30				Stadium: Sportanlage Leimen

29 June 2023 Friendly	Bellinzona (Switzerland)	2–3	(Switzerland) Lugano	Bioggio
17:30				Stadium: Campo Di Bioggio

18 November 2023 Friendly	Brescia (Italy)	4–0	(Switzerland) Bellinzona
12:00

13 January 2024 Friendly	Bellinzona (Switzerland)	0–0	(Switzerland) FC Paradiso	Bellinzona
11:00		Report		Stadium: Stadio Comunale Bellinzona

== Competitions ==
=== Overall record ===
Competition	First match	Last match	Starting round	Final position	Record							
Competition	First match	Last match	Starting round	Final position	Pld	W	D	L	GF	GA	GD	Win %
Swiss Challenge League	26 July 2023	20 May 2024	Matchday 1		18	6	5	7	17	25	−8	33.33
Swiss Cup	19 August 2023	31 October 2023	Round 1	Round 3	3	2	0	1	7	2	+5	66.67
Total					21	8	5	8	24	27	−3	38.10

Last updated: 17 December 2023
Source: Soccerway

=== Swiss Challenge League ===
==== League table ====
Pos	Team	Pld	W	D	L	GF	GA	GD	Pts	Promotion, qualification or relegation
6	Aarau	36	12	7	17	53	59	−6	43	
7	Nyon	36	11	10	15	45	58	−13	43	
8	Bellinzona	36	11	9	16	37	50	−13	42	
9	Schaffhausen	36	8	14	14	36	55	−19	38	
10	Baden (R)	36	6	8	22	31	82	−51	26	Relegation to Swiss Promotion League

Source: Swiss Challenge League
Rules for classification: 1) Points; 2) Goal difference; 3) Goals scored; 4) Head-to-head goal difference; 5) Head-to-head goals scored 6) Away goals scored; 7) Draw.
(R) Relegated

==== Results summary ====
Overall								Home						Away					
Pld	W	D	L	GF	GA	GD	Pts	W	D	L	GF	GA	GD	W	D	L	GF	GA	GD
18	6	5	7	17	25	−8	23	3	1	5	7	15	−8	3	4	2	10	10	0

Last updated: 17 December 2023.

==== Results by round ====
Round	1	2	3	4	5	6	7	8	9	10	11	12	13	14	15	16	17	18	19
Ground	H	A	A	H	H	A	H	A	H	A	H	A	H	A	H	A	H	A	H
Result	L	D	L	L	L	D	L	D	W	W	D	W	L	D	W	L	W	W	
Position	8	8	8	8	9	8	9	9	9	9	8	8	9	9	8	8	7	6	

Updated to match(es) played on 17 December 2023. Source:
A = Away; H = Home; W = Win; D = Draw; L = Loss; P = Postponed

==== Matches ====
23 July 2023 1	Bellinzona	0–2	Wil	Bellinzona
14:15 CEST (UTC+2)			Bahloul 6', 67'	Stadium: Stadio Comunale Bellinzona; Referee: Lionel Tschudi

30 July 2023 2	Baden	1–1	Bellinzona	Fislisbach
14:15 CEST (UTC+2)	Giampà 35'		Ocampo 18'	Stadium: Stadion Esp; Referee: David Huwiler

4 August 2023 3	Sion	1–0	Bellinzona	Sion
20:15 CEST (UTC+2)	Hefti 11'			Stadium: Stade de Tourbillon; Referee: Nico Gianforte

13 August 2023 4	Bellinzona	1–3	Aarau	Bellinzona
14:15 CEST (UTC+2)	Pollero 3'		Fazliu 14' (pen.); Wetz 62'; Da Silva 85'	Stadium: Stadio Comunale Bellinzona; Referee: Marijan Drmic

25 August 2023 5	Bellinzona	0–3	Thun	Bellinzona
20:15 CEST (UTC+2)			Koné 3'; Dos Santos 63'; Toggenburger 83'	Stadium: Stadio Comunale Bellinzona; Referee: Tobias Thies

1 September 2023 6	Neuchâtel Xamax	1–1	Bellinzona	Neuchâtel
19:30 CEST (UTC+2)	Surdez 43'		Neelakandan 90+4'	Stadium: Stade de la Maladière; Referee: Marijan Drmic

22 September 2023 7	Bellinzona	0–4	Vaduz	Bellinzona
19:30 CEST (UTC+2)			Chabbi 18'; Djokic 50'; Cicek 87'; Fosso 89'	Stadium: Stadio Comunale Bellinzona; Referee: Nico Gianforte

26 September 2023 8	Schaffhausen	0–0	Bellinzona	Schaffhausen
19:30 CEST (UTC+2)				Stadium: Berformance Arena; Referee: Michèle Schmölzer

1 October 2023 9	Bellinzona	1–0	Stade Nyonnais	Bellinzona
14:15 CEST (UTC+2)	Dieye 65'			Stadium: Stadio Comunale Bellinzona; Referee: Tobias Thies

8 October 2023 10	Aarau	1–2	Bellinzona	Aarau
14:15 CEST (UTC+2)	Avdyli 3'		Sauter 38', 42'	Stadium: Stadion Brügglifeld; Referee: Luca Piccolo

22 October 2023 11	Bellinzona	0–0	Schaffhausen	Bellinzona
14:15 CEST (UTC+2)				Stadium: Stadio Comunale Bellinzona; Referee: Hajrim Qovanaj

27 October 2023 12	Stade Nyonnais	2–3	Bellinzona	Nyon
19:30 CEST (UTC+2)	Gaillard 65'; Koré 90+5' (pen.)		Dieye (penalty missed) 48'; Chacón 49'; Samba 78'; Sauter 90+6'	Stadium: Colovray Sports Centre; Referee: Johannes von Mandach

5 November 2023 13	Bellinzona	1–2	Sion	Bellinzona
14:15 CET (UTC+1)	Pollero 78'		Chouaref 20'; Schmied 58'	Stadium: Stadio Comunale Bellinzona; Referee: David Huwiler

10 November 2023 14	Wil	0–0	Bellinzona	Wil
19:30 CET (UTC+1)				Stadium: Lidl Arena; Referee: Stefan Horisberger

26 November 2023 15	Bellinzona	3–1	Baden	Bellinzona
14:15 CET (UTC+1)	Mahmoud 17'; Mihajlović 33'; Pollero 54'		Giampà 22'	Stadium: Stadio Comunale Bellinzona; Referee: David Schärli

10 December 2023 17	Bellinzona	1–0	Neuchâtel Xamax	Bellinzona
14:15 CET (UTC+1)	Samba 46'			Stadium: Stadio Comunale Bellinzona; Referee: Michèle Schmölzer

13 December 2023 16	Thun	3–1	Bellinzona	Thun
19:00 CET (UTC+1)	Roth 5'; Iacobucci 47' (o.g.); Ndongo 53'		Chacón 59'	Stadium: Stockhorn Arena; Referee: David Huwiler

17 December 2023 18	Vaduz	1–2	Bellinzona	Vaduz
14:15 CET (UTC+1)	Isik 90+1'		Pollero 50', 88'	Stadium: Rheinpark Stadion; Referee: Nico Gianforte

27 January 2024 19	Bellinzona	v	Thun	Bellinzona
18:00 CET (UTC+1)				Stadium: Stadio Comunale Bellinzona

=== Swiss Cup ===
19 August 2023 Round 1	FC Buchs	0–4	Bellinzona	Buchs
16:00 CEST (UTC+2)			Pollero 15', 57', 70'; Pugliese 86' (pen.)	Stadium: Sportplatz Buchs

17 September 2023 Round 2	Bellinzona	3–1 (a.e.t.)	Schaffhausen	Bellinzona
16:00 CEST (UTC+2)	Mihajlović 23'; Pugliese 103'; Dieye 116'		Bunjaku 53' (pen.); González (yellow card) 69' (yellow-red card) 90+2'; Rhyner (yellow card) 113' (yellow-red card) 120+3'	Stadium: Stadio Comunale Bellinzona; Referee: Maxime Odiet

31 October 2023 Round 3	Bellinzona	0–1 (a.e.t.)	Zürich	Bellinzona
18:30 CET (UTC+1)			Okita 93'	Stadium: Stadio Comunale Bellinzona; Referee: Lionel Tschudi
