= Tim Väyrynen =

Finnish footballer (born 1993)

Personal information
- Full name: Tim Olavi Väyrynen
- Date of birth: 30 March 1993 (age 33)
- Place of birth: Espoo, Finland
- Height: 1.91 m (6 ft 3 in)
- Position: Striker

Youth career
- 2005–2009: Honka

Senior career*
Years	Team	Apps	(Gls)
2010–2014	Honka	81	(34)
2014–2015	Borussia Dortmund II	19	(2)
2015	→ Viktoria Köln (loan)	13	(7)
2015–2017	Dynamo Dresden	15	(3)
2017–2018	Hansa Rostock	41	(5)
2018–2019	Roda JC Kerkrade	13	(0)
2019–2021	HJK	33	(11)
2021	Tirana	14	(0)
2021–2022	KuPS	37	(20)
2023–2024	Vaduz	21	(2)
2024–2025	Gnistan	44	(10)
2026	Livorno	8	(0)

International career^{‡}
2007–2008	Finland U15	3	(0)
2008–2009	Finland U16	15	(6)
2009–2010	Finland U17	13	(4)
2010–2011	Finland U18	21	(5)
2011	Finland U19	1	(0)
2012–2014	Finland U21	17	(7)
2013–	Finland	13	(0)
Medal record
Honka
First place	Finnish League Cup	2010
First place	Finnish League Cup	2011
First place	Finnish Cup	2012
Viktoria Köln
First place	Middle Rhine Cup	2015
Third place	Regionalliga West	2015
Dynamo Dresden
First place	3. Liga	2016
Hansa Rostock
First place	Mecklenburg-Vorpommern Cup	2017
First place	Mecklenburg-Vorpommern Cup	2018
- * Club domestic league appearances and goals as of 30 April 2026 ‡ National team caps and goals as of 11 January 2019

Tim Väyrynen (born 30 March 1993) is a Finnish professional footballer who plays as a striker.

Väyrynen made his international debut for Finland in October 2013, at the age of 20 and has since had over 10 caps, including appearing in UEFA Euro 2016 qualifying.

== Club career ==
=== FC Honka ===
He was selected as the Player of the Month for June 2013 and October 2013 and to the Team of the Month for June, September and October 2013 in Veikkausliiga.

Väyrynen finished the season as the top goal scorer with 17 league goals in 24 appearances for the 2013 Veikkausliiga. At the end of the season, he was officially selected as the striker of the year and the player of the year 2013.

=== Borussia Dortmund II ===
On 10 January 2014, he joined reserve side Borussia Dortmund II for an undisclosed fee. On 22 February, Väyrynen scored on his 3. Liga debut against MSV Duisburg.

=== Viktoria Köln ===
On 30 January 2015, Väyrynen left Dortmund II and joined fourth tier Regionalliga West side Viktoria Köln on loan for the remainder of the 2014–15 season. On 14 February, he scored in his league debut against SV Rödinghausen.

=== Dynamo Dresden ===
On 3 July 2015, he joined Dynamo Dresden. On 25 July 2015, Väyrynen scored on his Dynamo Dresden 3. Liga debut against Stuttgart II besides assisting two goals. During season 2015–16 he gained 14 caps and scored 3 goals.

=== Hansa Rostock ===
On 19 January 2017 it was announced that Väyrynen had signed a contract with Hansa Rostock.

=== Roda ===
After two seasons in Hansa on Väyrynen joined Roda JC on a one-year contract with an option for two more years.

=== HJK ===
On 17 July 2019, Väyrynen returned to Finland, joining HJK and signing a two-year contract.

=== Tirana ===
On 21 January 2021, Väyrynen joined Albanian club KF Tirana, signing a 1.5 years contract.

=== KuPS ===
On 2 August 2021, Väyrynen signed a contract with KuPS until the end of 2022.

=== Vaduz ===
On 21 February 2023, Väyrynen joined Swiss Challenge League club FC Vaduz on a one-year contract. On 20 December 2023, the club announced that his contract was extended until the summer of 2024.

=== IF Gnistan ===
On 17 July 2024, Väyrynen returned to Finland and signed with Gnistan in Veikkausliiga until the end of the 2025 season. He was named the Veikkausliiga Player of the Month in August, after scoring three goals and providing an assist in four matches during the month.

=== Livorno ===
On 6 February 2026, Väyrynen signed for Livorno in the Italian third-tier Serie C.

== International career ==
=== Youth ===
Väyrynen scored a hat-trick when Finland U21 beat Wales U21 5–1 in Bangor 14 August 2013 in UEFA U21 qualifications.

=== Senior ===
He made his debut for the Finnish national team on 30 October 2013 in a friendly match in Qualcomm Stadium, San Diego against Mexico when he replaced Mikael Forssell as a substitute for the second half. He made his second appearance for Finland national football team in match against Czech Republic on 21 May 2014. He made his UEFA European Championship qualification match debut on 7 September 2015 in a match against Faroe Islands when he entered as a 74th-minute substitute for Riku Riski.

== Personal life ==
His father is former Finnish league striker Mika Väyrynen (born, 1965, not to be confused with the former Finnish international Mika Väyrynen).

== Career statistics ==
=== Club ===
As of 30 April 2025

Appearances and goals by club, season and competition
Club	Season	League			National cup (Note: Includes Suomen Cup, DFB-Pokal, KNVB Cup and Liechtenstein Cup)		League cup (Note: Includes Finnish League Cup, Middle Rhine Cup and Mecklenburg-Vorpommern Cup)		Europe		Total	
Club	Season	Division	Apps	Goals	Apps	Goals	Apps	Goals	Apps	Goals	Apps	Goals
FC Honka	2010	Veikkausliiga	1	0	0	0	1	0	0	0	2	0
FC Honka	2011	Veikkausliiga	27	7	0	0	3	1	2 (Note: Appearances in the Europa League)	0	32	8
FC Honka	2012	Veikkausliiga	29	10	4	1	3	2	—		36	13
FC Honka	2013	Veikkausliiga	24	17	0	0	2	0	2	0	28	17
FC Honka	Total		81	34	4	1	9	3	4	0	98	38
Borussia Dortmund II	2013–14	3. Liga	8	2	—		—		—		8	2
Borussia Dortmund II	2014–15	3. Liga	11	0	—		—		—		11	0
Borussia Dortmund II	Total		19	2	—		—		—		19	2
Viktoria Köln (loan)	2014–15	Regionalliga West	13	7	0	0	3	1	—		16	8
Dynamo Dresden	2015–16	3. Liga	14	3	—		—		—		14	3
Dynamo Dresden	2016–17	2. Bundesliga	1	0	0	0	—		—		1	0
Dynamo Dresden	Total		15	3	0	0	—		0	0	15	3
Hansa Rostock	2016–17	3. Liga	12	1	—		1	0	—		13	1
Hansa Rostock	2017–18	3. Liga	29	4	0	0	5	5	—		34	9
Hansa Rostock	Total		41	5	0	0	6	5	0	0	47	10
Roda	2018–19	Eerste Divisie	13	0	1	1	–		—		14	1
HJK	2019	Veikkausliiga	12	2	0	0	0	0	4 (Note: Appearances in the Champions League)	2	16	4
HJK	2020	Veikkausliiga	21	9	8	4	0	0	—		29	13
HJK	Total		33	11	8	4	0	0	4	2	45	17
Tirana	2020–21	Kategoria Superiore	15	0	0	0	—		—		15	0
KuPS	2021	Veikkausliiga	13	9	0	0	0	0	2 (Note: Appearances in UEFA Europa Conference League)	0	15	9
KuPS	2022	Veikkausliiga	24	11	4	2	3	1	6	2	37	16
KuPS	Total		37	20	4	2	3	1	8	2	52	25
Vaduz	2022–23	Swiss Challenge League	11	0	2	1	—		—		13	1
Vaduz	2023–24	Swiss Challenge League	10	2	3	0	—		2	0	9	3
Vaduz	Total		21	2	5	1	0	0	2	0	28	3
Gnistan	2024	Veikkausliiga	14	5	0	0	0	0	–		14	5
Gnistan	2025	Veikkausliiga	4	0	0	0	5	4	–		9	4
Gnistan	Total		18	5	0	0	5	4	0	0	23	9
Career total			306	89	22	9	26	14	18	4	372	116

=== International ===
As of 11 January 2019

National team	Year	Competitive		Friendly		Total	
National team	Year	Apps	Goals	Apps	Goals	Apps	Goals
Finland	2013	0	0	1	0	1	0
Finland	2014	0	0	1	0	1	0
Finland	2015	1	0	3	0	4	0
Finland	2016	0	0	1	0	1	0
Finland	2017	0	0	1	0	1	0
Finland	2018	0	0	3	0	3	0
Finland	2019	0	0	2	0	2	0
Total		1	0	12	0	13	0

== Honours ==
Vaduz

- Liechtenstein Cup: 2022–23, 2023–24

KuPS

- Veikkausliiga runner-up: 2021, 2022
- Finnish Cup: 2021, 2022

Hansa Rostock

- Mecklenburg-Vorpommern Cup: 2017, 2018

Dynamo Dresden

- 3. Liga: 2016

Viktoria Köln

- Middle Rhine Cup: 2015

Honka

- Finnish Cup: 2012
- Finnish League Cup: 2010, 2011
- Veikkausliiga: Runner-up 2013

Individual

- Veikkausliiga Player of the Month: June 2013, October 2013, May 2022, August 2024
- Veikkausliiga Player of the Year: 2013
- Veikkausliiga Top Scorer: 2013
- Veikkausliiga Striker of the Year: 2013
- Veikkausliiga Team of the Year: 2021
- Finland national under-21 football team Player of the Year 2013
