= Elmin Rastoder =

Macedonian footballer (born 2001)

Personal information
- Date of birth: 7 October 2001 (age 25)
- Place of birth: Wetzikon, Switzerland
- Height: 1.91 m (6 ft 3 in)
- Position: Forward

Team information
- Current team: Panathinaikos
- Number: 74

Youth career
- –2018: Rapperswil-Jona
- 2017–2022: Grasshopper

Senior career*
Years	Team	Apps	(Gls)
2019–2022	Grasshopper II	48	(19)
2020–2024	Grasshopper	9	(0)
2022–2023	→ Vaduz (loan)	32	(7)
2024	→ Vaduz (loan)	14	(1)
2024–2026	Thun	63	(20)
2026–	Panathinaikos	8	(1)

International career^{‡}
2025–	North Macedonia	13	(1)
- * Club domestic league appearances and goals as of 14 November 2026 ‡ National team caps and goals as of 16 November 2026

Elmin Rastoder (born 7 October 2001) is a professional footballer who plays as a forward for Super League Greece club Panathinaikos. Born in Switzerland, he represents the North Macedonia national team.

== Club career ==
=== Grasshopper Club Zürich ===
Rastoder joined Grasshopper's academy in 2017 and has been a part of their various youth squads. In the 2021–22 1. Liga season, he scored 13 goals in 26 games for the Grasshopper U21 squad.

==== Loan to Vaduz ====
He made his professional debut for the first team of Grasshopper on 16 October 2020 against Xamax in the Swiss Challenge League. His top flight debut in the Swiss Super League occurred on 20 March 2022 against Basel, when he was subbed on for the last ten minutes of the game. He extended his contract with Grasshopper on 7 April 2022, keeping him at the club until 2024. To further develop his skills and earn more play time, he was loaned to FC Vaduz in the Swiss Challenge League for the 2022–23 season. In 44 appearances for Vaduz, he scored twelve goals, including one goal in the UEFA Europa Conference League against Ukrainian side SC Dnipro-1.

==== Return to Grasshopper ====
Following the conclusion of the season, he returned to Grasshoppers to start the preparation for the next season. However, he was unable to find a fixed spot on the squad during the first half of the season, managing just over 100 minutes played across six games. On 6 February 2024, he returned to Vaduz for another loan spell.

=== Thun ===
On 3 June 2024, he signed a three-year contract with Thun. He helped Thun win the 2024–25 Swiss Challenge League, and the following season their first ever first division title, the 2025–26 Swiss Super League.

=== Panathinaikos ===
Following a spectacular season, during which Rastoder set a personal best with 15 goals, various teams expressed interest in his services. Eventually, on 29 June 2026 the young striker joined Panathinaikos on a four-year contract for a fee around €3,500,000.

== Career statistics ==
=== Club ===
As of 1 November 2026

Appearances and goals by club, season and competition
Club	Season	League			National cup		League cup		Continental		Total	
Club	Season	Division	Apps	Goals	Apps	Goals	Apps	Goals	Apps	Goals	Apps	Goals
Grasshopper II	2019–20	1. Liga Classic	11	3	—		—		—		11	3
Grasshopper II	2020–21	1. Liga Classic	11	3	—		—		—		11	3
Grasshopper II	2021–22	1. Liga Classic	28 (Note: Includes two matches of the promotion play-off.)	13	—		—		—		28	13
Grasshopper II	Total		50	19	—		—		—		50	19
Grasshopper	2020–21	Swiss Challenge League	1	0	—		—		—		1	0
Grasshopper	2021–22	Swiss Super League	2	0	—		—		—		2	0
Grasshopper	2023–24	Swiss Super League	6	0	2	0	—		—		8	0
Grasshopper	Total		9	0	2	0	—		—		11	0
Vaduz (loan)	2022–23	Swiss Challenge League	32	7	4	4	—		8 (Note: Appearances in UEFA Europa Conference League)	1	44	12
Vaduz (loan)	2023–24	Swiss Challenge League	14	1	0	0	—		—		14	1
Thun	2024–25	Swiss Challenge League	28	5	2	0	—		—		30	5
Thun	2025–26	Swiss Super League	36	15	1	0	—		—		37	15
Thun	Total		64	20	3	0	—		—		67	20
Panathinaikos	2026–27	Superleague Greece	7	1	3	1	—		7	2	17	4
Career total			176	48	12	5	0	0	15	3	203	56

=== International ===
As of match played 16 November 2026

Appearances and goals by national team and year
National team	Year	Apps	Goals
North Macedonia
North Macedonia	2025	5	0
North Macedonia	2026	8	1
Total		13	1

As of match played 13 November 2026
Scores and results list North Macedonia's goal tally first, score column indicates score after each Rastoder goal.

List of international goals scored by Elmin Rastoder
No.	Date	Venue	Cap	Opponent	Score	Result	Competition
1	13 November 2026	Hampden Park, Glasgow, Scotland	12	Scotland	1–1	1–2	2026–27 UEFA Nations League B

== Honors ==
Grasshopper

- Swiss Challenge League: 2020–21

Vaduz

- Liechtenstein Cup: 2022–23

Thun

- Swiss Super League: 2025–26
- Swiss Challenge League: 2024–25
