= 2022–23 UEFA Europa Conference League group stage =

The 2022–23 UEFA Europa Conference League group stage began on 8 September 2022 and ended on 3 November 2022. A total of 32 teams competed in the group stage to decide 8 of the 16 places in the knockout phase of the 2022–23 UEFA Europa Conference League.

All teams besides AZ, Basel, CFR Cluj, Gent, Partizan, Slavia Prague and Slovan Bratislava, who competed in last season's group stage, made their debut appearances in the group stage. Ballkani, Djurgårdens IF, Dnipro-1, Pyunik, RFS, Silkeborg, Slovácko, Vaduz and Žalgiris made their debut appearances in a UEFA competition group stage. Ballkani, Vaduz and Žalgiris were the first teams from Kosovo, Liechtenstein and Lithuania, respectively, to play in a UEFA competition group stage.

A total of 28 national associations were represented in the group stage.

== Draw ==
The draw for the group stage was held on 26 August 2022 in Istanbul, Turkey. The 32 teams were drawn into eight groups of four. For the draw, the teams were seeded into four pots, each of eight teams, based on their 2022 UEFA club coefficients. Teams from the same association and, for political reasons, teams from Serbia and Kosovo could not be drawn into the same group. Prior to the draw, UEFA formed pairings of teams from the same association, including those playing in the Europa League group stage (one pairing for associations with two or three teams, two pairings for associations with four or five teams), based on television audiences, where one team was drawn into Groups A–D and another team was drawn into Groups E–H, so that the two teams would have different kick-off times. The following pairings were announced by UEFA after the group stage teams were confirmed (the second team in a pairing marked by UEL played in the Europa League group stage):

1. (Czech Republic) Slavia Prague and Slovácko
2. (Belgium) Gent and Anderlecht
3. (Serbia) Partizan and Red Star Belgrade (UEL)
4. (Ukraine) Dnipro-1 and Dynamo Kyiv (UEL)
5. (Turkey) İstanbul Başakşehir and Sivasspor
6. (Romania) CFR Cluj and FCSB
8. (Sweden) Djurgårdens IF and Malmö FF (UEL)
9. (Denmark) Silkeborg and Midtjylland (UEL)
10. (Norway) Molde and Bodø/Glimt (UEL)
13. (France) Nice and Nantes (UEL)
14. Austria Wien and Sturm Graz (UEL)
16. (Switzerland) Basel and Zürich (UEL)

== Teams ==
Below were the participating teams (with their 2022 UEFA club coefficients), grouped by their seeding pot. They included:

- 22 winners of the play-off round (5 from Champions Path, 17 from Main Path)
- 10 losers of the Europa League play-off round

Key to colours
Group winners advanced directly to round of 16
Group runners-up advanced to knockout round play-offs

Pot 1
Team	Notes	Coeff.
(Spain) Villarreal		78.000
(Switzerland) Basel		55.000
(Czech Republic) Slavia Prague		52.000
(Netherlands) AZ		28.500
(Belgium) Gent		27.500
(Turkey) İstanbul Başakşehir		25.000
(Serbia) Partizan		24.500
(England) West Ham United		21.328

Pot 2
Team	Notes	Coeff.
(Romania) CFR Cluj		19.500
(Norway) Molde		19.000
(Romania) FCSB		17.500
(Italy) Fiorentina		15.380
(Germany) 1. FC Köln		15.042
(Israel) Hapoel Be'er Sheva		14.000
(Cyprus) Apollon Limassol		14.000
(Slovakia) Slovan Bratislava		13.000

Pot 3
Team	Notes	Coeff.
(France) Nice		12.016
(Belgium) Anderlecht		11.500
(Lithuania) Žalgiris		8.000
Austria Wien		7.770
(Scotland) Heart of Midlothian		7.380
(Republic of Ireland) Shamrock Rovers		7.000
(Turkey) Sivasspor		6.500
(Liechtenstein) Vaduz		6.500

Pot 4
Team	Notes	Coeff.
(Ukraine) Dnipro-1		6.360
(Poland) Lech Poznań		6.000
(Czech Republic) Slovácko		5.560
(Denmark) Silkeborg		5.435
(Sweden) Djurgårdens IF		4.575
(Armenia) Pyunik		4.250
(Latvia) RFS		4.000
(Kosovo) Ballkani		1.633

Notes

1. ^{ECL-CP} Winners of play-off round (Champions Path).
2. ^{ECL-MP} Winners of play-off round (Main Path).
3. ^{EL-PO} Losers of Europa League play-off round

== Format ==
In each group, teams played against each other home-and-away in a round-robin format. The winners of each group advanced to the round of 16, while the runners-up advanced to the knockout round play-offs. The third-placed and fourth-placed teams were eliminated from European competitions for the season.

=== Tiebreakers ===
Teams were ranked according to points (3 points for a win, 1 point for a draw, 0 points for a loss). If two or more teams were tied on points, the following tiebreaking criteria were applied, in the order given, to determine the rankings (see Article 16 Equality of points – group stage, Regulations of the UEFA Europa Conference League):

1. Points in head-to-head matches among the tied teams;
2. Goal difference in head-to-head matches among the tied teams;
3. Goals scored in head-to-head matches among the tied teams;
4. If more than two teams were tied, and after applying all head-to-head criteria above, a subset of teams were still tied, all head-to-head criteria above were reapplied exclusively to this subset of teams;
5. Goal difference in all group matches;
6. Goals scored in all group matches;
7. Away goals scored in all group matches;
8. Wins in all group matches;
9. Away wins in all group matches;
10. Disciplinary points (direct red card = 3 points; double yellow card = 3 points; single yellow card = 1 point);
11. UEFA club coefficient.

Due to the abolition of the away goals rule, head-to-head away goals were no longer applied as a tiebreaker starting from last season. However, total away goals were still applied as a tiebreaker.

== Groups ==
The fixtures were announced on 27 August 2022, the day after the draw. The matches were played on 8 September, 15 September, 6 October, 13 October, 27 October and 3 November 2022. The scheduled kick-off times were 16:30, 18:45 and 21:00 CET/CEST.

Times are CET/CEST, (Note: CEST (UTC+2) for dates up to 29 October 2022 (matchdays 1–5), and CET (UTC+1) for date thereafter (matchday 6).) as listed by UEFA (local times, if different, are in parentheses).

=== Group A ===
Pos	Team	Pld	W	D	L	GF	GA	GD	Pts	Qualification	IBS	FIO	HEA	RFS
1	(Turkey) İstanbul Başakşehir	6	4	1	1	14	3	+11	13 (Note: Tied on head-to-head points. Head-to-head goal difference: İstanbul Başakşehir +2, Fiorentina −2.)	Advance to round of 16	—	3–0	3–1	3–0
2	(Italy) Fiorentina	6	4	1	1	14	6	+8	13	Advance to knockout round play-offs	2–1	—	5–1	1–1
3	(Scotland) Heart of Midlothian	6	2	0	4	6	16	−10	6		0–4	0–3	—	2–1
4	(Latvia) RFS	6	0	2	4	2	11	−9	2		0–0	0–3	0–2	—

Source: UEFA
Rules for classification: Group stage tiebreakers
Notes:
8 September 2022
18:45

Fiorentina (Italy)	1–1	(Latvia) RFS
Barák 56'	Report	Ilić 74'

Stadio Artemio Franchi, Florence
Attendance: 11,738
Referee: Pavel Orel (Czech Republic)
8 September 2022
18:45 (17:45 UTC+1)

Heart of Midlothian (Scotland)	0–4	(Turkey) İstanbul Başakşehir
	Report	Kaldırım 26'; Ndayishimiye 67'; Okaka 75'; Özcan 82'

Tynecastle Park, Edinburgh
Attendance: 15,131
Referee: Krzysztof Jakubik (Poland)

15 September 2022
21:00 (22:00 UTC+3)

RFS (Latvia)	0–2	(Scotland) Heart of Midlothian
	Report	Shankland 43' (pen.); Forrest 90+3'

Skonto Stadium, Riga (Note: RFS played their home matches at Skonto Stadium, Riga, instead of their regular stadium, LNK Sporta Parks, Riga, which did not meet UEFA requirements.)
Attendance: 6,747
Referee: Aleksandar Stavrev (North Macedonia)
15 September 2022
21:00 (22:00 UTC+3)

İstanbul Başakşehir (Turkey)	3–0	(Italy) Fiorentina
Gürler 57', 71'; Traoré 90'	Report

Başakşehir Fatih Terim Stadium, Istanbul
Attendance: 5,857
Referee: Guillermo Cuadra Fernández (Spain)

6 October 2022
21:00 (20:00 UTC+1)

Heart of Midlothian (Scotland)	0–3	(Italy) Fiorentina
	Report	Mandragora 4'; Kouamé 42'; Jović 79'

Tynecastle Park, Edinburgh
Attendance: 17,243
Referee: Erik Lambrechts (Belgium)
6 October 2022
21:00 (22:00 UTC+3)

RFS (Latvia)	0–0	(Turkey) İstanbul Başakşehir
	Report

Skonto Stadium, Riga
Attendance: 5,154
Referee: Radu Petrescu (Romania)

13 October 2022
18:45 (19:45 UTC+3)

İstanbul Başakşehir (Turkey)	3–0	(Latvia) RFS
Türüç 11'; Okaka 45', 72'	Report

Başakşehir Fatih Terim Stadium, Istanbul
Attendance: 3,080
Referee: Philip Farrugia (Malta)
13 October 2022
18:45

Fiorentina (Italy)	5–1	(Scotland) Heart of Midlothian
Jović 6'; Biraghi 22'; González 32', 79' (pen.); Barák 38'	Report	Humphrys 47'

Stadio Artemio Franchi, Florence
Attendance: 18,576
Referee: Ivan Bebek (Croatia)

27 October 2022
18:45

Fiorentina (Italy)	2–1	(Turkey) İstanbul Başakşehir
Jović 26', 61'	Report	Aleksić 14'

Stadio Artemio Franchi, Florence
Attendance: 14,345
Referee: Allard Lindhout (Netherlands)
27 October 2022
21:00 (20:00 UTC+1)

Heart of Midlothian (Scotland)	2–1	(Latvia) RFS
Shankland 3'; Halliday 12'	Report	Friesenbichler 39'

Tynecastle Park, Edinburgh
Attendance: 15,863
Referee: Bram Van Driessche (Belgium)

3 November 2022
16:30 (17:30 UTC+2)

RFS (Latvia)	0–3	(Italy) Fiorentina
	Report	Barák 7'; Cabral 44'; Saponara 45+2'

Skonto Stadium, Riga
Attendance: 6,747
Referee: Mads-Kristoffer Kristoffersen (Denmark)
3 November 2022
16:30 (18:30 UTC+3)

İstanbul Başakşehir (Turkey)	3–1	(Scotland) Heart of Midlothian
Ndayishimiye 4'; Gürler 33'; Özcan 64'	Report	Atkinson 90'

Başakşehir Fatih Terim Stadium, Istanbul
Attendance: 4,824
Referee: Goga Kikacheishvili (Georgia)

=== Group B ===
Pos	Team	Pld	W	D	L	GF	GA	GD	Pts	Qualification	WHU	AND	SIL	FCSB
1	(England) West Ham United	6	6	0	0	13	4	+9	18	Advance to round of 16	—	2–1	1–0	3–1
2	(Belgium) Anderlecht	6	2	2	2	6	5	+1	8	Advance to knockout round play-offs	0–1	—	1–0	2–2
3	(Denmark) Silkeborg	6	2	0	4	12	7	+5	6		2–3	0–2	—	5–0
4	(Romania) FCSB	6	0	2	4	3	18	−15	2		0–3	0–0	0–5	—

Source: UEFA
Rules for classification: Group stage tiebreakers
8 September 2022
18:45

Anderlecht (Belgium)	1–0	(Denmark) Silkeborg
Silva 80' (pen.)	Report

Constant Vanden Stock Stadium, Brussels
Attendance: 11,557
Referee: István Vad (Hungary)
8 September 2022
21:00 (20:00 UTC+1)

West Ham United (England)	3–1	(Romania) FCSB
Bowen 69' (pen.); Emerson 74'; Antonio 90'	Report	Cordea 34'

London Stadium, London
Attendance: 33,312
Referee: Benoît Bastien (France)

15 September 2022
21:00 (22:00 UTC+3)

FCSB (Romania)	0–0	(Belgium) Anderlecht
	Report

Arena Națională, Bucharest
Attendance: 29,613
Referee: Sebastian Gishamer (Austria)
15 September 2022
21:00

Silkeborg (Denmark)	2–3	(England) West Ham United
Kusk 5'; Tengstedt 75'	Report	Lanzini 13' (pen.); Scamacca 25'; Dawson 38'

Silkeborg Stadium, Silkeborg
Attendance: 6,702
Referee: Fábio Veríssimo (Portugal)

6 October 2022
18:45

Anderlecht (Belgium)	0–1	(England) West Ham United
	Report	Scamacca 79'

Constant Vanden Stock Stadium, Brussels
Attendance: 17,033
Referee: Novak Simović (Serbia)
6 October 2022
18:45

Silkeborg (Denmark)	5–0	(Romania) FCSB
Klynge 3'; Kusk 7'; Helenius 35' (pen.); Þórðarson 58'; Adamsen 71'	Report

Silkeborg Stadium, Silkeborg
Attendance: 5,945
Referee: Mykola Balakin (Ukraine)

13 October 2022
21:00 (22:00 UTC+3)

FCSB (Romania)	0–5	(Denmark) Silkeborg
	Report	Kusk 12'; Klynge 16'; Tengstedt 63'; Jørgensen 68', 70'

Arena Națională, Bucharest
Attendance: 9,103
Referee: Nick Walsh (Scotland)
13 October 2022
21:00 (20:00 UTC+1)

West Ham United (England)	2–1	(Belgium) Anderlecht
Benrahma 14'; Bowen 30'	Report	Esposito 89' (pen.)

London Stadium, London
Attendance: 40,767
Referee: Willy Delajod (France)

27 October 2022
18:45

Anderlecht (Belgium)	2–2	(Romania) FCSB
Verschaeren 38'; Vertonghen 75'	Report	Compagno 60'; Dawa 82'

Constant Vanden Stock Stadium, Brussels
Attendance: 14,226
Referee: Manfredas Lukjančukas (Lithuania)
27 October 2022
21:00 (20:00 UTC+1)

West Ham United (England)	1–0	(Denmark) Silkeborg
Lanzini 24' (pen.)	Report

London Stadium, London
Attendance: 35,911
Referee: Joni Hyytiä (Finland)

3 November 2022
21:00 (22:00 UTC+2)

FCSB (Romania)	0–3	(England) West Ham United
	Report	Fornals 40', 65'; Dawa 56' (o.g.)

Arena Națională, Bucharest
Attendance: 20,172
Referee: Sascha Stegemann (Germany)
3 November 2022
21:00

Silkeborg (Denmark)	0–2	(Belgium) Anderlecht
	Report	Refaelov 20'; Raman 90+4'

Silkeborg Stadium, Silkeborg
Attendance: 6,810
Referee: Daniele Chiffi (Italy)

=== Group C ===
Pos	Team	Pld	W	D	L	GF	GA	GD	Pts	Qualification	VIL	LCH	HBS	AW
1	(Spain) Villarreal	6	4	1	1	14	9	+5	13	Advance to round of 16	—	4–3	2–2	5–0
2	(Poland) Lech Poznań	6	2	3	1	12	7	+5	9	Advance to knockout round play-offs	3–0	—	0–0	4–1
3	(Israel) Hapoel Be'er Sheva	6	1	4	1	8	5	+3	7		1–2	1–1	—	4–0
4	Austria Wien	6	0	2	4	2	15	−13	2		0–1	1–1	0–0	—

Source: UEFA
Rules for classification: Group stage tiebreakers
8 September 2022
18:45

Villarreal (Spain)	4–3	(Poland) Lech Poznań
Chukwueze 32'; Baena 36', 40'; Coquelin 89'	Report	Skóraś 2'; Ishak 46' (pen.), 61'

Ciutat de València, Valencia (Note: Villarreal played their home matches at Estadi Ciutat de València, Valencia, instead of their regular stadium, Estadio de la Cerámica, Villarreal, due to ongoing stadium renovations.)
Attendance: 10,385
Referee: Ali Palabıyık (Turkey)
8 September 2022
18:45

Austria Wien	0–0	(Israel) Hapoel Be'er Sheva
	Report

Franz Horr Stadium, Vienna
Attendance: 9,400
Referee: Horațiu Feșnic (Romania)

15 September 2022
21:00 (22:00 UTC+3)

Hapoel Be'er Sheva (Israel)	1–2	(Spain) Villarreal
Hatuel 63'	Report	Morales 28' (pen.); Baena 67'

Turner Stadium, Be'er Sheva
Attendance: 13,413
Referee: Willie Collum (Scotland)
15 September 2022
21:00

Lech Poznań (Poland)	4–1	Austria Wien
Ishak 27'; Skóraś 64'; Velde 76', 90'	Report	Braunöder 29'

Stadion Poznań, Poznań
Attendance: 20,102
Referee: Peter Kjærsgaard (Denmark)

6 October 2022
18:45

Lech Poznań (Poland)	0–0	(Israel) Hapoel Be'er Sheva
	Report

Stadion Poznań, Poznań
Attendance: 17,283
Referee: Tamás Bognár (Hungary)
6 October 2022
21:00

Villarreal (Spain)	5–0	Austria Wien
Baena 18'; Danjuma 43'; Morales 76', 80', 88'	Report

Ciutat de València, Valencia
Attendance: 9,539
Referee: Jochem Kamphuis (Netherlands)

13 October 2022
18:45

Austria Wien	0–1	(Spain) Villarreal
	Report	Jackson 87'

Franz Horr Stadium, Vienna
Attendance: 11,000
Referee: Georgi Kabakov (Bulgaria)
13 October 2022
21:00 (22:00 UTC+3)

Hapoel Be'er Sheva (Israel)	1–1	(Poland) Lech Poznań
Hemed 9' (pen.)	Report	Szymczak 44'

Turner Stadium, Be'er Sheva
Attendance: 11,668
Referee: Ruddy Buquet (France)

27 October 2022
18:45

Villarreal (Spain)	2–2	(Israel) Hapoel Be'er Sheva
Chukwueze 57'; Danjuma 70'	Report	Hemed 48' (pen.); Yehezkel 79'

Ciutat de València, Valencia
Attendance: 6,338
Referee: Juxhin Xhaja (Albania)
27 October 2022
18:45

Austria Wien	1–1	(Poland) Lech Poznań
Keles 69'	Report	Ishak 48'

Franz Horr Stadium, Vienna
Attendance: 12,211
Referee: Darren England (England)

3 November 2022
21:00

Lech Poznań (Poland)	3–0	(Spain) Villarreal
Velde 27'; Skóraś 51', 77'	Report

Stadion Poznań, Poznań
Attendance: 30,117
Referee: Nathan Verboomen (Belgium)
3 November 2022
21:00 (22:00 UTC+2)

Hapoel Be'er Sheva (Israel)	4–0	Austria Wien
Yehezkel 29'; Safouri 33'; Shechter 63'; Handl 73' (o.g.)	Report

Turner Stadium, Be'er Sheva
Attendance: 12,500
Referee: Elchin Masiyev (Azerbaijan)

=== Group D ===
Pos	Team	Pld	W	D	L	GF	GA	GD	Pts	Qualification	NCE	PRT	KLN	SVK
1	(France) Nice	6	2	3	1	8	7	+1	9 (Note: Head-to-head points: Nice 4, Partizan 1.)	Advance to round of 16	—	2–1	1–1	1–2
2	(Serbia) Partizan	6	2	3	1	9	7	+2	9	Advance to knockout round play-offs	1–1	—	2–0	1–1
3	(Germany) 1. FC Köln	6	2	2	2	8	8	0	8		2–2	0–1	—	4–2
4	(Czech Republic) Slovácko	6	1	2	3	8	11	−3	5		0–1	3–3	0–1	—

Source: UEFA
Rules for classification: Group stage tiebreakers
Notes:
8 September 2022
18:45

Slovácko (Czech Republic)	3–3	(Serbia) Partizan
Kalabiška 5', 19'; Kozák 83'	Report	Diabaté 47', 53'; Gomes 62'

Městský fotbalový stadion Miroslava Valenty, Uherské Hradiště
Attendance: 7,032
Referee: Rob Harvey (Republic of Ireland)
8 September 2022
19:40 (Note: The Nice v 1. FC Köln match, originally scheduled to be played at 18:45, was delayed to 19:40 due to violent clashes between rival supporters.)

Nice (France)	1–1	(Germany) 1. FC Köln
Delort 62' (pen.)	Report	Tigges 19'

Allianz Riviera, Nice
Attendance: 19,000
Referee: Luís Godinho (Portugal)

15 September 2022
21:00

Partizan (Serbia)	1–1	(France) Nice
Diabaté 60'	Report	Bryan 2'

Partizan Stadium, Belgrade
Attendance: 9,126
Referee: Andrew Madley (England)
15 September 2022
21:00

1. FC Köln (Germany)	4–2	(Czech Republic) Slovácko
Adamyan 10'; Dietz 42'; Ljubičić 65' (pen.), 74'	Report	Kalabiška 49'; Petržela 52'

RheinEnergieStadion, Cologne
Attendance: 47,700
Referee: Yevhen Aranovskyi (Ukraine)

6 October 2022
18:45

Slovácko (Czech Republic)	0–1	(France) Nice
	Report	Pépé 54'

Městský fotbalový stadion Miroslava Valenty, Uherské Hradiště
Attendance: 7,447
Referee: Julian Weinberger (Austria)
6 October 2022
21:00

1. FC Köln (Germany)	0–1	(Serbia) Partizan
	Report	Marković 9'

RheinEnergieStadion, Cologne
Attendance: 47,000
Referee: Ricardo de Burgos Bengoetxea (Spain)

13 October 2022
18:45

Partizan (Serbia)	2–0	(Germany) 1. FC Köln
Diabaté 15'; Gomes 52'	Report

Partizan Stadium, Belgrade
Attendance: 15,467
Referee: Roi Reinshreiber (Israel)
13 October 2022
21:00

Nice (France)	1–2	(Czech Republic) Slovácko
Diop 14'	Report	Tomič 75'; Reinberk 86'

Allianz Riviera, Nice
Attendance: 0 (Note: The match was played behind closed doors due to violent clashes between rival supporters during Nice's home match against 1. FC Köln.)
Referee: Iwan Griffith (Wales)

27 October 2022 (Note: The Slovácko v 1. FC Köln match was suspended after six minutes due to adverse weather conditions with the score 0–0 at the time. It was resumed on 28 October 2022, 13:00.)
18:45

Slovácko (Czech Republic)	0–1	(Germany) 1. FC Köln
	Report	Duda 82' (pen.)

Městský fotbalový stadion Miroslava Valenty, Uherské Hradiště
Attendance: 7,333
Referee: Giorgi Kruashvili (Georgia)
27 October 2022
18:45

Nice (France)	2–1	(Serbia) Partizan
Pépé 29'; Lemina 77'	Report	Gomes 74'

Allianz Riviera, Nice
Attendance: 11,324
Referee: István Vad (Hungary)

3 November 2022
21:00

Partizan (Serbia)	1–1	(Czech Republic) Slovácko
Natcho 41' (pen.)	Report	Mihálik 73'

Partizan Stadium, Belgrade
Attendance: 17,256
Referee: Paweł Raczkowski (Poland)
3 November 2022
21:00

1. FC Köln (Germany)	2–2	(France) Nice
Huseinbašić 48'; Duda 60'	Report	Laborde 40'; Brahimi 43'

RheinEnergieStadion, Cologne
Attendance: 47,000
Referee: César Soto Grado (Spain)

=== Group E ===
Pos	Team	Pld	W	D	L	GF	GA	GD	Pts	Qualification	AZ	DNI	APL	VAD
1	(Netherlands) AZ	6	5	0	1	12	6	+6	15	Advance to round of 16	—	2–1	3–2	4–1
2	(Ukraine) Dnipro-1	6	3	1	2	9	7	+2	10	Advance to knockout round play-offs	0–1	—	1–0	2–2
3	(Cyprus) Apollon Limassol	6	2	1	3	5	7	−2	7		1–0	1–3	—	1–0
4	(Liechtenstein) Vaduz	6	0	2	4	5	11	−6	2		1–2	1–2	0–0	—

Source: UEFA
Rules for classification: Group stage tiebreakers
8 September 2022
21:00

Dnipro-1 (Ukraine)	0–1	(Netherlands) AZ
	Report	D. de Wit 63'

Košická futbalová aréna, Košice, Slovakia (Note: Due to the Russian invasion of Ukraine, Ukrainian teams were required to play their home matches at neutral venues until further notice. Therefore, Dnipro-1 played at Košická futbalová aréna, Košice, Slovakia, instead of their regular stadium Dnipro-Arena, Dnipro.)
Attendance: 3,347
Referee: Yigal Frid (Israel)
8 September 2022
21:00

Vaduz (Liechtenstein)	0–0	(Cyprus) Apollon Limassol
	Report

Rheinpark Stadion, Vaduz
Attendance: 1,188
Referee: Dumitru Muntean (Moldova)

15 September 2022
18:45 (19:45 UTC+3)

Apollon Limassol (Cyprus)	1–3	(Ukraine) Dnipro-1
Pittas 57'	Report	Rubchynskyi 11'; Dovbyk 26', 45'

GSP Stadium, Nicosia (Note: Apollon Limassol played their home matches at GSP Stadium, Nicosia, instead of their regular stadium, Tsirio Stadium, Limassol, which did not meet UEFA requirements.)
Attendance: 4,158
Referee: Ádám Farkas (Hungary)
15 September 2022
18:45

AZ (Netherlands)	4–1	(Liechtenstein) Vaduz
Barası 19'; Beukema 81'; Sugawara 90+2'; D. de Wit 90+5'	Report	Goelzer 22'

AFAS Stadion, Alkmaar
Attendance: 8,523
Referee: Nick Walsh (Scotland)

6 October 2022
18:45

Dnipro-1 (Ukraine)	2–2	(Liechtenstein) Vaduz
Dovbyk 5'; Pikhalyonok 78'	Report	Fehr 26'; Gasser 47'

Košická futbalová aréna, Košice, Slovakia
Attendance: 2,050
Referee: Fran Jović (Croatia)
6 October 2022
21:00

AZ (Netherlands)	3–2	(Cyprus) Apollon Limassol
Odgaard 16'; D. de Wit 62' (pen.); Karlsson 85'	Report	Joosten 19'; Cabral 71'

AFAS Stadion, Alkmaar
Attendance: 10,016
Referee: Rohit Saggi (Norway)

13 October 2022
18:45 (19:45 UTC+3)

Apollon Limassol (Cyprus)	1–0	(Netherlands) AZ
Roberge 32'	Report

GSP Stadium, Nicosia
Attendance: 3,011
Referee: Morten Krogh (Denmark)
13 October 2022
21:00

Vaduz (Liechtenstein)	1–2	(Ukraine) Dnipro-1
Rastoder 30'	Report	Hamache 25'; Dovbyk 90+1'

Rheinpark Stadion, Vaduz
Attendance: 1,131
Referee: Marian Alexandru Barbu (Romania)

27 October 2022
18:45

Vaduz (Liechtenstein)	1–2	(Netherlands) AZ
Hasler 77'	Report	Kerkez 50'; Van Brederode 75'

Rheinpark Stadion, Vaduz
Attendance: 1,949
Referee: Don Robertson (Scotland)
27 October 2022
21:00

Dnipro-1 (Ukraine)	1–0	(Cyprus) Apollon Limassol
Pikhalyonok 39'	Report

Košická futbalová aréna, Košice, Slovakia
Attendance: 2,520
Referee: António Nobre (Portugal)

3 November 2022
18:45 (19:45 UTC+2)

Apollon Limassol (Cyprus)	1–0	(Liechtenstein) Vaduz
Roberge 32'	Report

GSP Stadium, Nicosia
Attendance: 712
Referee: Dario Bel (Croatia)
3 November 2022
18:45

AZ (Netherlands)	2–1	(Ukraine) Dnipro-1
Odgaard 8'; Pavlidis 87'	Report	Dovbyk 40'

AFAS Stadion, Alkmaar
Attendance: 12,387
Referee: Anastasios Papapetrou (Greece)

=== Group F ===
Pos	Team	Pld	W	D	L	GF	GA	GD	Pts	Qualification	DJU	GNT	MOL	SHR
1	(Sweden) Djurgårdens IF	6	5	1	0	12	6	+6	16	Advance to round of 16	—	4–2	3–2	1–0
2	(Belgium) Gent	6	2	2	2	10	6	+4	8	Advance to knockout round play-offs	0–1	—	4–0	3–0
3	(Norway) Molde	6	2	1	3	9	10	−1	7		2–3	0–0	—	3–0
4	(Republic of Ireland) Shamrock Rovers	6	0	2	4	1	10	−9	2		0–0	1–1	0–2	—

Source: UEFA
Rules for classification: Group stage tiebreakers
8 September 2022
21:00

Molde (Norway)	0–0	(Belgium) Gent
	Report

Aker Stadion, Molde
Attendance: 4,158
Referee: Petri Viljanen (Finland)
8 September 2022
21:00 (20:00 UTC+1)

Shamrock Rovers (Republic of Ireland)	0–0	(Sweden) Djurgårdens IF
	Report

Tallaght Stadium, Tallaght
Attendance: 6,330
Referee: Ívar Orri Kristjánsson (Iceland)

15 September 2022
18:45

Djurgårdens IF (Sweden)	3–2	(Norway) Molde
Doumbouya 50'; Banda 58'; Asoro 90+1'	Report	Fofana 39' (pen.); Breivik 77'

Tele2 Arena, Stockholm
Attendance: 16,673
Referee: Gergő Bogár (Hungary)
15 September 2022
18:45

Gent (Belgium)	3–0	(Republic of Ireland) Shamrock Rovers
Cuypers 9'; Odjidja-Ofoe 18', 65'	Report

Ghelamco Arena, Ghent
Attendance: 7,813
Referee: Visar Kastrati (Kosovo)

6 October 2022
18:45

Molde (Norway)	3–0	(Republic of Ireland) Shamrock Rovers
Brynhildsen 10', 49'; Hussain 58'	Report

Aker Stadion, Molde
Attendance: 3,669
Referee: Miloš Milanović (Serbia)
6 October 2022
21:00

Gent (Belgium)	0–1	(Sweden) Djurgårdens IF
	Report	Danielson 37'

Ghelamco Arena, Ghent
Attendance: 10,896
Referee: Aleksei Kulbakov (Belarus)

13 October 2022
18:45

Djurgårdens IF (Sweden)	4–2	(Belgium) Gent
Holmberg 21'; Wikheim 42', 46'; Banda 45+4'	Report	Depoitre 61'; Cuypers 73'

Tele2 Arena, Stockholm
Attendance: 16,822
Referee: Manfredas Lukjančukas (Lithuania)
13 October 2022
21:00 (20:00 UTC+1)

Shamrock Rovers (Republic of Ireland)	0–2	(Norway) Molde
	Report	Fofana 33'; Eriksen 69'

Tallaght Stadium, Tallaght
Attendance: 5,860
Referee: Dario Bel (Croatia)

27 October 2022
21:00

Molde (Norway)	2–3	(Sweden) Djurgårdens IF
Brynhildsen 5'; Kaasa 21'	Report	Edvardsen 44'; Asoro 67'; Radetinac 76'

Aker Stadion, Molde
Attendance: 5,545
Referee: Urs Schnyder (Switzerland)
27 October 2022
21:00 (20:00 UTC+1)

Shamrock Rovers (Republic of Ireland)	1–1	(Belgium) Gent
Gaffney 3'	Report	Hong 74'

Tallaght Stadium, Tallaght
Attendance: 6,203
Referee: Julian Weinberger (Austria)

3 November 2022
18:45

Djurgårdens IF (Sweden)	1–0	(Republic of Ireland) Shamrock Rovers
Eriksson 19'	Report

Tele2 Arena, Stockholm
Attendance: 16,726
Referee: Nick Walsh (Scotland)
3 November 2022
18:45

Gent (Belgium)	4–0	(Norway) Molde
Hjulsager 52'; Godeau 62'; Kums 80'; Cuypers 89' (pen.)	Report

Ghelamco Arena, Ghent
Attendance: 12,000
Referee: Sebastian Gishamer (Austria)

=== Group G ===
Pos	Team	Pld	W	D	L	GF	GA	GD	Pts	Qualification	SIV	CLJ	SLP	BLK
1	(Turkey) Sivasspor	6	3	2	1	11	7	+4	11	Advance to round of 16	—	3–0	1–1	3–4
2	(Romania) CFR Cluj	6	3	1	2	5	5	0	10	Advance to knockout round play-offs	0–1	—	2–0	1–0
3	(Czech Republic) Slavia Prague	6	2	2	2	6	7	−1	8		1–1	0–1	—	3–2
4	(Kosovo) Ballkani	6	1	1	4	8	11	−3	4		1–2	1–1	0–1	—

Source: UEFA
Rules for classification: Group stage tiebreakers
8 September 2022
18:45

Ballkani (Kosovo)	1–1	(Romania) CFR Cluj
Ar. Thaqi 65'	Report	Matias 90+1'

Fadil Vokrri Stadium, Pristina (Note: Ballkani played their home matches at Fadil Vokrri Stadium, Pristina, instead of their regular stadium, Theranda City Stadium, Suva Reka, which did not meet UEFA requirements.)
Attendance: 5,673
Referee: Urs Schnyder (Switzerland)
8 September 2022
21:00 (22:00 UTC+3)

Sivasspor (Turkey)	1–1	(Czech Republic) Slavia Prague
Saba 27'	Report	Olayinka 4'

New Sivas 4 Eylül Stadium, Sivas
Attendance: 5,472
Referee: Fran Jović (Croatia)

15 September 2022
18:45 (19:45 UTC+3)

CFR Cluj (Romania)	0–1	(Turkey) Sivasspor
	Report	Gradel 28' (pen.)

Stadionul Dr. Constantin Rădulescu, Cluj-Napoca
Attendance: 7,026
Referee: Allard Lindhout (Netherlands)
15 September 2022
18:45

Slavia Prague (Czech Republic)	3–2	(Kosovo) Ballkani
Frashëri 26' (o.g.); Olayinka 34'; Masopust 41'	Report	Krasniqi 23'; Korenica 29'

Fortuna Arena, Prague
Attendance: 18,156
Referee: Willy Delajod (France)

6 October 2022
18:45 (19:45 UTC+3)

Sivasspor (Turkey)	3–4	(Kosovo) Ballkani
Ulvestad 1'; Yeşilyurt 75'; Yatabaré 90+1'	Report	Ar. Thaqi 20'; Potoku 31'; Korenica 66'; Krasniqi 90+4'

New Sivas 4 Eylül Stadium, Sivas
Attendance: 4,336
Referee: José Luis Munuera Montero (Spain)
6 October 2022
21:00

Slavia Prague (Czech Republic)	0–1	(Romania) CFR Cluj
	Report	Janga 45'

Fortuna Arena, Prague
Attendance: 18,271
Referee: Fabio Maresca (Italy)

13 October 2022
18:45 (19:45 UTC+3)

CFR Cluj (Romania)	2–0	(Czech Republic) Slavia Prague
Deac 11' (pen.); Matias 84'	Report

Stadionul Dr. Constantin Rădulescu, Cluj-Napoca
Attendance: 11,218
Referee: Luís Godinho (Portugal)
13 October 2022
21:00

Ballkani (Kosovo)	1–2	(Turkey) Sivasspor
Ar. Thaqi 36'	Report	Arslan 72'; Angielski 81'

Fadil Vokrri Stadium, Pristina
Attendance: 12,650
Referee: Manuel Schüttengruber (Austria)

27 October 2022
21:00

Ballkani (Kosovo)	0–1	(Czech Republic) Slavia Prague
	Report	Lingr 75'

Fadil Vokrri Stadium, Pristina
Attendance: 10,500
Referee: Morten Krogh (Denmark)
27 October 2022
21:00 (22:00 UTC+3)

Sivasspor (Turkey)	3–0	(Romania) CFR Cluj
Yatabaré 22', 73'; Janga 64' (o.g.)	Report

New Sivas 4 Eylül Stadium, Sivas
Attendance: 6,050
Referee: Rohit Saggi (Norway)

3 November 2022
18:45

Slavia Prague (Czech Republic)	1–1	(Turkey) Sivasspor
Goutas 65' (o.g.)	Report	Gradel 28' (pen.)

Fortuna Arena, Prague
Attendance: 18,132
Referee: Rade Obrenović (Slovenia)
3 November 2022
18:45 (19:45 UTC+2)

CFR Cluj (Romania)	1–0	(Kosovo) Ballkani
Adjei-Boateng 17'	Report

Stadionul Dr. Constantin Rădulescu, Cluj-Napoca
Attendance: 11,723
Referee: Daniel Schlager (Germany)

=== Group H ===
Pos	Team	Pld	W	D	L	GF	GA	GD	Pts	Qualification	SLO	BSL	PYU	ZAL
1	(Slovakia) Slovan Bratislava	6	3	2	1	9	7	+2	11 (Note: Head-to-head points: Slovan Bratislava 4, Basel 1.)	Advance to round of 16	—	3–3	2–1	0–0
2	(Switzerland) Basel	6	3	2	1	11	9	+2	11	Advance to knockout round play-offs	0–2	—	3–1	2–2
3	(Armenia) Pyunik	6	2	0	4	8	9	−1	6		2–0	1–2	—	2–0
4	(Lithuania) Žalgiris	6	1	2	3	5	8	−3	5		1–2	0–1	2–1	—

Source: UEFA
Rules for classification: Group stage tiebreakers
Notes:
8 September 2022
21:00

Basel (Switzerland)	3–1	(Armenia) Pyunik
Males 23' (pen.); Burger 54', 76'	Report	Dashyan 27'

St. Jakob-Park, Basel
Attendance: 11,860
Referee: Juan Martínez Munuera (Spain)
8 September 2022
21:00

Slovan Bratislava (Slovakia)	0–0	(Lithuania) Žalgiris
	Report

Tehelné pole, Bratislava
Attendance: 11,227
Referee: Rauf Jabarov (Azerbaijan)

15 September 2022
18:45 (19:45 UTC+3)

Žalgiris (Lithuania)	0–1	(Switzerland) Basel
	Report	Zeqiri 62'

LFF Stadium, Vilnius
Attendance: 4,821
Referee: Iwan Griffith (Wales)
15 September 2022
18:45 (20:45 UTC+4)

Pyunik (Armenia)	2–0	(Slovakia) Slovan Bratislava
Dashyan 35'; Otubanjo 37'	Report

Vazgen Sargsyan Republican Stadium, Yerevan
Attendance: 3,500
Referee: Gal Laibuvitz (Israel)

6 October 2022
18:45 (20:45 UTC+4)

Pyunik (Armenia)	2–0	(Lithuania) Žalgiris
Juninho 44'; Otubanjo 61'	Report

Vazgen Sargsyan Republican Stadium, Yerevan
Attendance: 5,304
Referee: John Beaton (Scotland)
6 October 2022
21:00

Basel (Switzerland)	0–2	(Slovakia) Slovan Bratislava
	Report	Pauschek 35'; Čavrić 45+1'

St. Jakob-Park, Basel
Attendance: 14,870
Referee: Kevin Clancy (Scotland)

13 October 2022
18:45

Slovan Bratislava (Slovakia)	3–3	(Switzerland) Basel
Weiss 45+2' (pen.); Kucka 49'; Čavrić 53'	Report	Males 29' (pen.); Diouf 65'; Zeqiri 72'

Tehelné pole, Bratislava
Attendance: 20,233
Referee: Serhiy Boyko (Ukraine)
13 October 2022
21:00 (22:00 UTC+3)

Žalgiris (Lithuania)	2–1	(Armenia) Pyunik
Ourega 23'; Oliveira 42'	Report	Özbiliz 78' (pen.)

LFF Stadium, Vilnius
Attendance: 3,025
Referee: Juxhin Xhaja (Albania)

27 October 2022
21:00

Basel (Switzerland)	2–2	(Lithuania) Žalgiris
Diouf 1'; Zeqiri 18'	Report	Oyewusi 42', 62'

St. Jakob-Park, Basel
Attendance: 13,236
Referee: Ali Palabıyık (Turkey)
27 October 2022
21:00

Slovan Bratislava (Slovakia)	2–1	(Armenia) Pyunik
Kashia 84'; Ramírez 85'	Report	Cociuc 64' (pen.)

Tehelné pole, Bratislava
Attendance: 15,783
Referee: Manuel Schüttengruber (Austria)

3 November 2022
18:45 (19:45 UTC+2)

Žalgiris (Lithuania)	1–2	(Slovakia) Slovan Bratislava
Kyeremeh 47'	Report	Čavrić 15', 23'

LFF Stadium, Vilnius
Attendance: 4,790
Referee: Luis Godinho (Portugal)
3 November 2022
18:45 (21:45 UTC+4)

Pyunik (Armenia)	1–2	(Switzerland) Basel
Juričić 72'	Report	Males 17'; Kade 29'

Vazgen Sargsyan Republican Stadium, Yerevan
Attendance: 9,967
Referee: Horațiu Feșnic (Romania)
