= Dejan Djokic (footballer) =

Swiss footballer (born 2000)

Personal information
- Date of birth: 26 September 2000 (age 26)
- Place of birth: Walenstadt, Switzerland
- Height: 1.87 m (6 ft 2 in)
- Position: Forward

Team information
- Current team: Vaduz
- Number: 19

Senior career*
Years	Team	Apps	(Gls)
2017–2019	Vaduz 2	41	(10)
2019–2024	Vaduz	136	(29)
2024–2025	Sion	22	(2)
2025–2026	→ Debrecen (loan)	5	(0)
2026–	Vaduz	10	(0)
- * Club domestic league appearances and goals as of 7 November 2026

Dejan Djokic (born 26 September 2000) is a Swiss-Serbian professional footballer who plays as a forward for Liechtensteiner Swiss Super League club Vaduz.

== Club career ==
Djokic is a youth product of Vaduz, and signed his first professional contract with them in 2020. He helped the club get promoted into the Swiss Super League for the 2020–21 season. He made his professional debut with Vaduz in a 1–0 Swiss Super League loss to FC St. Gallen on 27 September 2020.

Djokic won the Liechtenstein Cup three times with Vaduz, scoring a hat-trick in the 2023-24 Final in a 5-0 win over FC Triesenberg.

On 21 May 2024, FC Vaduz announced that Djokic and several other players will leave the club at the end of the season.

On 2 August 2025, Djokic signed with Nemzeti Bajnokság I Hungarian club Debreceni VSC.

== Career statistics ==
As of match played 7 November 2026

Appearances and goals by club, season and competition
Club	Season	League			National cup (Note: Includes Liechtenstein Cup, Swiss Cup, Magyar Kupa)		Europe		Other		Total	
Club	Season	Division	Apps	Goals	Apps	Goals	Apps	Goals	Apps	Goals	Apps	Goals
Vaduz	2019–20	Swiss Challenge League	11	1	1	1	0	0	1 (Note: Appearance in Swiss Super League promotion play-offs)	0	13	2
Vaduz	2020–21	Swiss Super League	28	3	–		0	0	–		28	3
Vaduz	2021–22	Swiss Challenge League	29	5	3	3	2 (Note: Appearances in UEFA Europa Conference League)	0	–		34	8
Vaduz	2022–23	Swiss Challenge League	32	6	3	7	7	0	–		42	13
Vaduz	2023–24	Swiss Challenge League	36	14	4	6	2	0	–		42	20
Vaduz	Total		136	29	11	17	11	0	1	0	159	46
Sion	2024–25	Swiss Super League	22	2	2	1	–		–		24	3
Debrecen	2025–26	Nemzeti Bajnokság I	5	0	2	0	–		–		7	0
Vaduz	2026–27	Swiss Super League	10	0	1	6	4	1	0	0	15	7
Career total			173	31	16	24	15	1	1	0	205	56

== Personal life ==
Born in Switzerland, Djokic is of Bosnian descent.

== Honours ==
FC Vaduz

- Liechtenstein Cup: 2021–22, 2022–23, 2023–24
