= Omerović =

Omerović is a surname. Notable people with the surname include:

- Anes Omerovic (born 1998), Austrian footballer
- Fahrudin Omerović (born 1961), Bosnian football coach and former player
- Meho Omerović (born 1959), Serbian politician
- Nail Omerović (born 2002), Bosnian footballer
