= Ryan Fosso =

Cameroonian footballer (born 2002)

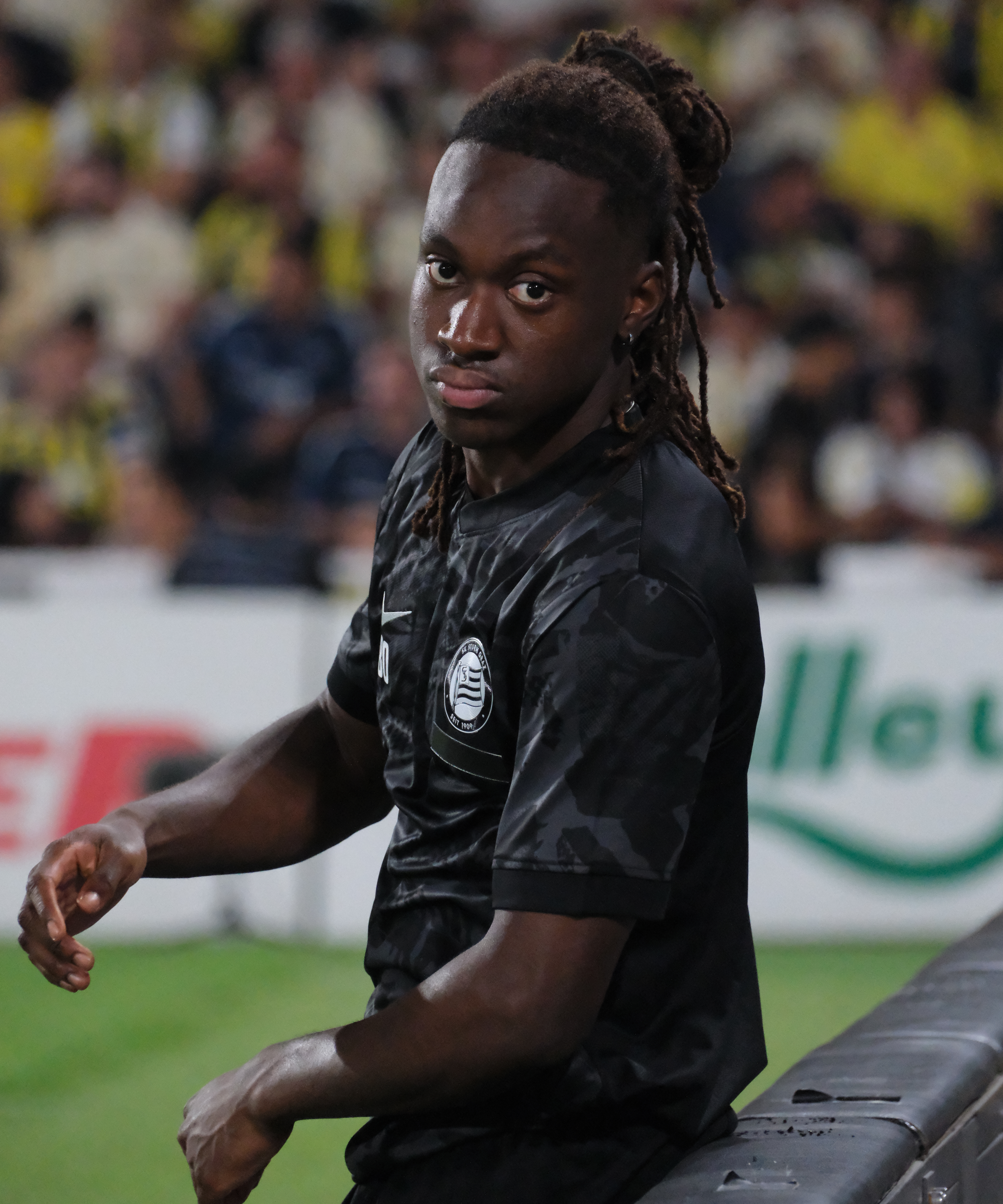

Personal information
- Full name: Donfack Ryan Gloire Fosso Ymefack
- Date of birth: 17 June 2002 (age 24)
- Place of birth: Lugano, Switzerland
- Height: 1.82 m (6 ft 0 in)
- Position: Midfielder

Team information
- Current team: Standard Liège
- Number: 80

Youth career
- 2019–2022: Young Boys

Senior career*
Years	Team	Apps	(Gls)
2020–2022	Young Boys U21	34	(4)
2022–2024	Vaduz	59	(3)
2024–2026	Fortuna Sittard	47	(1)
2026	Sturm Graz	15	(1)
2026–	Standard Liège	5	(0)

International career^{‡}
2023	Switzerland U20	2	(0)
2024	Switzerland U21	3	(0)
2026–	Cameroon	7	(1)
- * Club domestic league appearances and goals as of 12 September 2026 ‡ National team caps and goals as of 16 November 2026

Donfack Ryan Gloire Fosso Ymefack (born 17 June 2002) is a professional footballer who plays as a midfielder for Belgian Pro League club Standard Liège. Born in Switzerland, he plays for the Cameroon national team.

== Career ==
=== FC Vaduz ===
On 11 May 2022, Fosso moved to FC Vaduz from BSC Young Boys, Fosso signed a two-year contract until 2024. On 25 August 2022, Fosso featured in a 1–0 win against Rapid Wien which moved FC Vaduz into the group phase to the UEFA Conference League. On 23 May 2023, Fosso scored his first league goal against FC Stade Lausanne Ouchy in a 2–2 draw in stoppage time from a cross, Fosso also won a penalty.

=== Fortuna Sittard ===
On 25 June 2024, Fosso moved to Fortuna Sittard and signed a two-year contract.

=== Sturm Graz ===
On 14 January 2026, Fosso moved to Sturm Graz in Austria.

=== Standard Liège ===
On 14 August 2026, Fosso joined Belgian club Standard Liège with a three-season contract.

== International career ==
Fosso has represented Switzerland at youth levels.

On 11 March 2026, Fosso received approval from FIFA to switch his international allegiance to the Cameroon national team. He was called up to the Cameroon national team for a set of 2026 FIFA Series matches in March 2026.

== Personal life ==
Born in Switzerland, Fosso is of Cameroonian descent.

== Career statistics ==
=== Club ===
As of match played 12 September 2026

Appearances and goals by club, season and competition
Club	Season	League			National cup		Europe		Other		Total	
Club	Season	Division	Apps	Goals	Apps	Goals	Apps	Goals	Apps	Goals	Apps	Goals
Young Boys U21	2020–21	1. Liga Classic	11	3	—		—		—		11	3
Young Boys U21	2021–22	Swiss Promotion League	23	1	—		—		4 (Note: Appearances in qualification)	0	27	1
Young Boys U21	Total		34	4	—		—		4	0	38	4
Vaduz	2022–23	Swiss Challenge League	30	1	4	5	11 (Note: Appearances in UEFA Conference League)	0	—		45	6
Vaduz	2023–24	Swiss Challenge League	29	2	2	0	2	0	—		33	2
Vaduz	Total		59	3	6	5	13	0	—		78	8
Fortuna Sittard	2024–25	Eredivisie	30	1	2	0	—		—		32	1
Fortuna Sittard	2025–26	Eredivisie	17	0	2	0	—		—		19	0
Fortuna Sittard	Total		47	1	4	0	—		—		51	1
Sturm Graz	2025–26	Austrian Bundesliga	14	1	—		—		—		14	1
Sturm Graz	2026–27	Austrian Bundesliga	1	0	1	1	4 (Note: Four appearances in UEFA Champions League)	0	—		6	1
Sturm Graz	Total		15	1	1	1	4	0	—		20	2
Standard Liège	2026–27	Belgian Pro League	5	0	0	0	—		—		5	0
Career total			160	9	11	6	17	0	4	0	192	15

=== International ===
As of match played 16 November 2026

Appearances and goals by national team and year
National team	Year	Apps	Goals
Cameroon	2026	7	1
Total		7	1

== Honours ==
FC Vaduz

- Liechtenstein Football Cup: 2022–23, 2023–24
