= Dario Ulrich =

Swiss footballer (born 1998)

Personal information
- Date of birth: 12 March 1998 (age 28)
- Place of birth: Schwyz, Switzerland
- Height: 1.73 m (5 ft 8 in)
- Position: Right-back

Youth career
- FC Ägeri
- Team Zugerland
- Luzern

Senior career*
Years	Team	Apps	(Gls)
2014–2019	Luzern U21	49	(11)
2017–2018	→ Winterthur U21 (loan)	7	(1)
2017–2018	→ Winterthur (loan)	18	(0)
2018–2019	→ Kriens (loan)	27	(1)
2019–2021	Kriens	64	(6)
2021–2023	Vaduz	61	(1)
2023–2024	Luzern	31	(0)
2025–2026	Winterthur	31	(0)

International career^{‡}
2012–2013	Switzerland U15	6	(0)
2013–2014	Switzerland U16	8	(0)
2014	Switzerland U17	5	(0)
- * Club domestic league appearances and goals as of 26 May 2026 ‡ National team caps and goals as of 20:51, 20 October 2023 (UTC)

Dario Ulrich (born 12 March 1998) is a Swiss professional footballer who plays as a right-back.

== Career ==
Ulrich is a youth product of FC Ägeri, Team Zugerland and Luzern. He began his senior career with Luzern's reserves in the Swiss 1. Liga in 2014. On 28 August 2017, he was loaned to Winterthur for the season. The following season, he was loaned to Kriens. After his loan ended, Kriens opted to sign him permanently where he stayed 2 more seasons. On 9 September 2021, he transferred to the Liechtenstein club Vaduz on a 3-year contract. He helped Vaduz win two consecutive Liechtenstein Football Cups. On 27 June 2023, he returned to Luzern in the Swiss Super League, signing a contract until 2025.

== International career ==
Ulrich is a youth international for Switzerland. He played up to the Switzerland U17s, and has been called up to the Switzerland U20s.

== Honours ==
Vaduz

- Liechtenstein Football Cup: 2021–22, 2022–23
