= Franklin Sasere =

Swiss footballer

Personal information
- Full name: Franklin Olanitori Sasere
- Date of birth: 27 June 1998 (age 28)
- Place of birth: Ondo City, Nigeria
- Height: 1.85 m (6 ft 1 in)
- Position: Forward

Team information
- Current team: Birkirkara
- Number: 7

Senior career*
| Years | Team | Apps | (Gls) |
- Ifeanyi Ubah
| 2017–2019 | Sunshine Stars | 35 | (6) |
| 2019–2022 | Lugano | 5 | (0) |
| 2020–2022 | → Ħamrun Spartans (loan) | 47 | (19) |
| 2022–2023 | Vaduz | 35 | (4) |
| 2023–2024 | Újpest | 19 | (0) |
| 2024–2025 | Floriana | 32 | (14) |
| 2025– | Birkirkara | 11 | (4) |
- * Club domestic league appearances and goals as of 6 October 2025

Franklin Olanitori Sasere (born 27 June 1998) is a Nigerian professional footballer who plays as a forward for Maltese club Birkirkara.

== Playing career ==
Sasere made the move from Sunshine Stars to Lugano in September 2019, signing a three-year contract with the Swiss Super League club.

On 24 July 2023, Sasere signed with Újpest in Hungary.
