= Sofian Bahloul =

French footballer (born 1999)

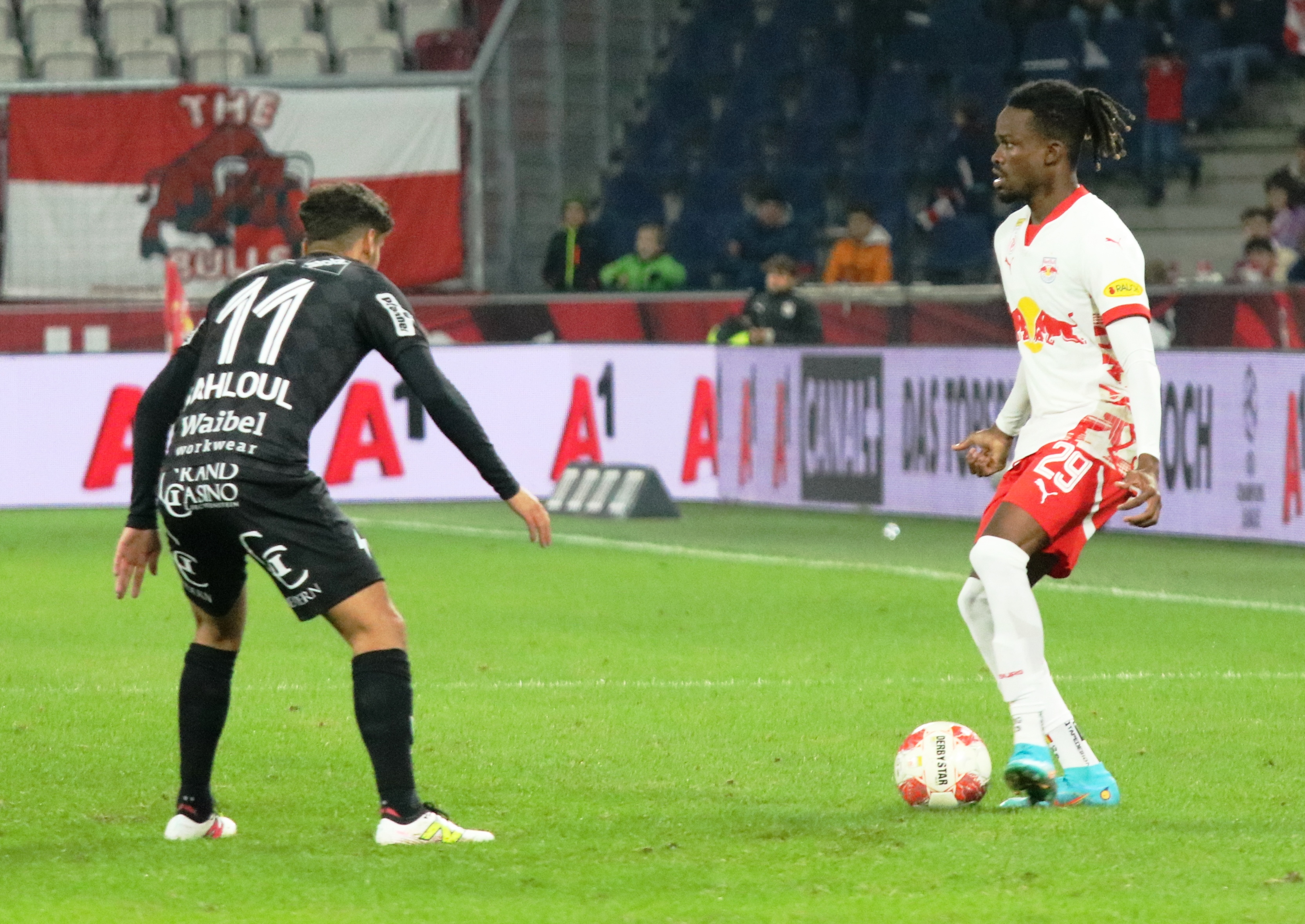
- Bahloul (left) and Daouda Guindo (right) in 2024.

Personal information
- Date of birth: 16 December 1999 (age 26)
- Place of birth: Nantes, France
- Height: 1.78 m (5 ft 10 in)
- Position: Right winger

Youth career
- –2018: Angers

Senior career*
Years	Team	Apps	(Gls)
2018–2021	Chiasso	95	(17)
2021–2024	Wil	85	(30)
2024–2025	Rheindorf Altach	24	(2)
2025	→ Aarau (loan)	17	(2)
- * Club domestic league appearances and goals as of 17 December 2025

Sofian Bahloul (Arabic: سفيان بهلول; born 16 December 1999) is a French Algerian professional footballer who plays as a right winger.

== Club career ==
=== Youth club ===
Bahloul played for the Angers Under-19's.

=== Chiasso ===
Bahloul joined Chiasso in February 2018.

He made his first appearance on 19 April 2018 against Wil, he came on in the 86th minute and only played for 3 minutes. The game resulted into 1–0 loss.

He played a total of 100 games from 2018 to 2021, scoring 20 goals in the Swiss Challenge League.

=== Wil ===
Bahloul joined Wil in July 2021.

He made his first appearance for Wil on 25 July against Vaduz, he was chosen in the starting lineup, but was substituted in the 78th minute. The game resulted in a 2–3 loss.

In Wil he played a total of 90 games, scoring 32 goals.

=== Rheindorf Altach ===
On 3 February 2024, Bahloul signed a two-and-a-half-year contract with Rheindorf Altach in Austria.

=== Aarau ===
On 20 January 2025, Bahloul returned to Switzerland and joined Aarau on loan with an option to buy. Aarau bought Bahloul in June, and terminated the contract in September 2025, as Bahloul did not participate in the season preparation or other trainings.

== Career statistics ==
As of match played 3 November 2024

Appearances and goals by club, season and competition
Club	Season	League			National cup		Continental		Total	
Club	Season	Division	Apps	Goals	Apps	Goals	Apps	Goals	Apps	Goals
Chiasso	2017–18	Challenge League	5	0	0	0	—		5	0
Chiasso	2018–19	Challenge League	25	1	2	0	—		27	1
Chiasso	2019–20	Challenge League	32	10	1	0	—		33	10
Chiasso	2020–21	Challenge League	33	6	2	3	—		35	9
Chiasso	Total		95	17	5	3	—		100	20
FC Wil	2021–22	Challenge League	35	14	2	0	—		37	14
FC Wil	2022–23	Challenge League	32	7	3	0	—		35	7
FC Wil	2023–24	Challenge League	18	9	2	2	—		20	11
FC Wil	Total		85	30	7	2	—		92	32
Rheindorf Altach	2023–24	Austrian Bundesliga	12	2	—		—		12	2
Rheindorf Altach	2024–25	Austrian Bundesliga	12	0	1	0	—		13	0
Rheindorf Altach	Total		24	2	1	0	—		25	2
Career total			204	49	13	5	—		192	54
