= Valentino Pugliese =

Swiss footballer (born 1997)

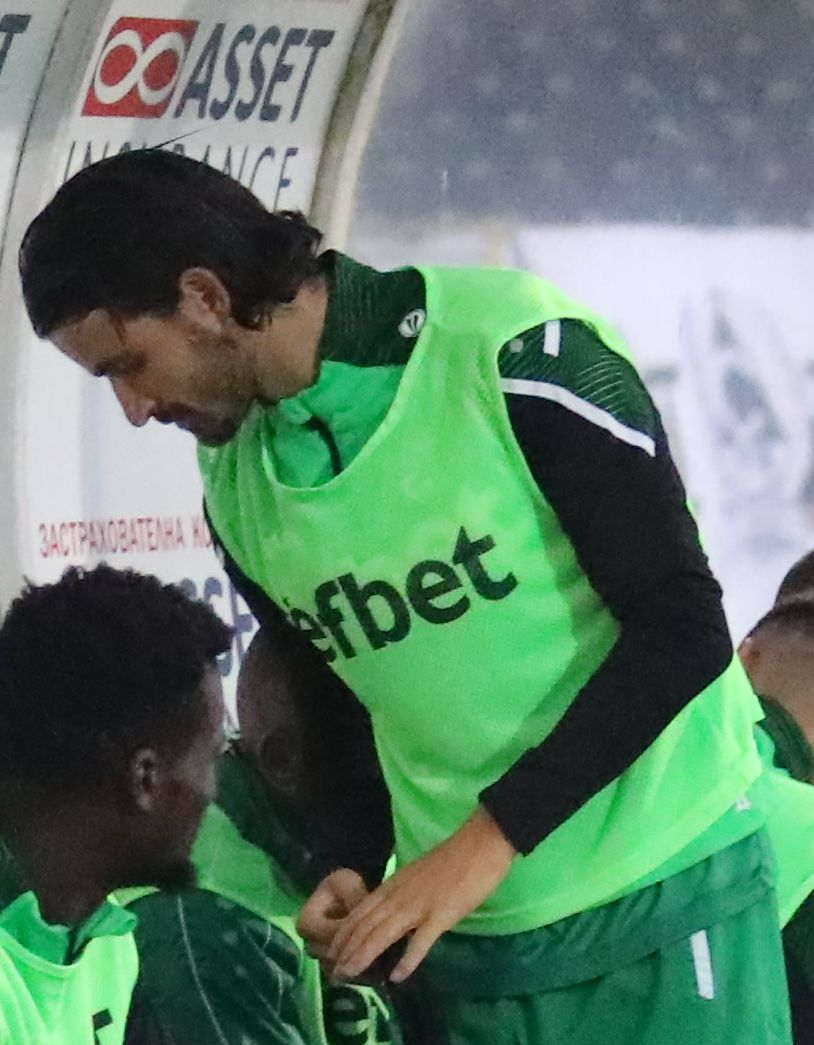

Personal information
- Date of birth: 18 July 1997 (age 29)
- Place of birth: Zürich, Switzerland
- Height: 1.74 m (5 ft 9 in)
- Position: Midfielder

Youth career
- Grasshoppers
- –2014: Basel
- 2014–2016: Zürich

Senior career*
Years	Team	Apps	(Gls)
2016–2018	St. Gallen	0	(0)
2017–2018	→ Wil (loan)	1	(0)
2018–2019	Schaffhausen	30	(4)
2019	Chiasso	9	(0)
2020–2021	Lokomotiv Plovdiv	7	(0)
2021	Dordrecht	5	(0)
2022	Tsarsko Selo	10	(0)
2022	Beroe	7	(0)
2023–2024	Bellinzona	23	(0)

International career
2012	Switzerland U15	2	(0)
2012–2013	Switzerland U16	3	(0)
2013	Switzerland U17	4	(0)
- * Club domestic league appearances and goals as of 28 May 2024

Valentino Pugliese (born 18 July 1997) is a Swiss professional footballer who plays as a midfielder.

== Club career ==
He has previously played for Wil, Schaffhausen and Chiasso in the Swiss Challenge League. In February 2020, he joined Bulgarian club Lokomotiv Plovdiv. In July 2022, Pugliese joined Beroe.

== Honours ==
=== Club ===
Lokomotiv Plovdiv

- Bulgarian Cup: 2019–20
