= Anes Omerovic =

Austrian footballer

Personal information
- Date of birth: 20 May 1998 (age 28)
- Place of birth: Dornbirn, Austria
- Height: 1.90 m (6 ft 3 in)
- Position: Midfielder

Team information
- Current team: Velež Mostar
- Number: 13

Youth career
- –2012: Dornbirn
- 2012–2014: AKA Vorarlberg
- 2014–2016: Aston Villa
- 2017: SV Schwechat

Senior career*
Years	Team	Apps	(Gls)
2018	Young Violets	9	(1)
2019–2020	Dornbirn	38	(4)
2020–2021	Winterthur	19	(0)
2021–2022	Dornbirn	14	(2)
2022–2023	Vaduz	24	(2)
2023–2025	First Vienna	57	(3)
2026–	Velež Mostar	13	(2)

International career
2013	Austria U15	2	(0)
2013–2014	Austria U16	10	(0)
2014–2015	Austria U17	12	(0)
2015	Austria U18	1	(0)
- * Club domestic league appearances and goals as of 19 September 2026

Anes Omerovic (born 20 May 1998) is an Austrian professional footballer who plays as a midfielder for Bosnian Premier League club Velež Mostar.

== Club career ==
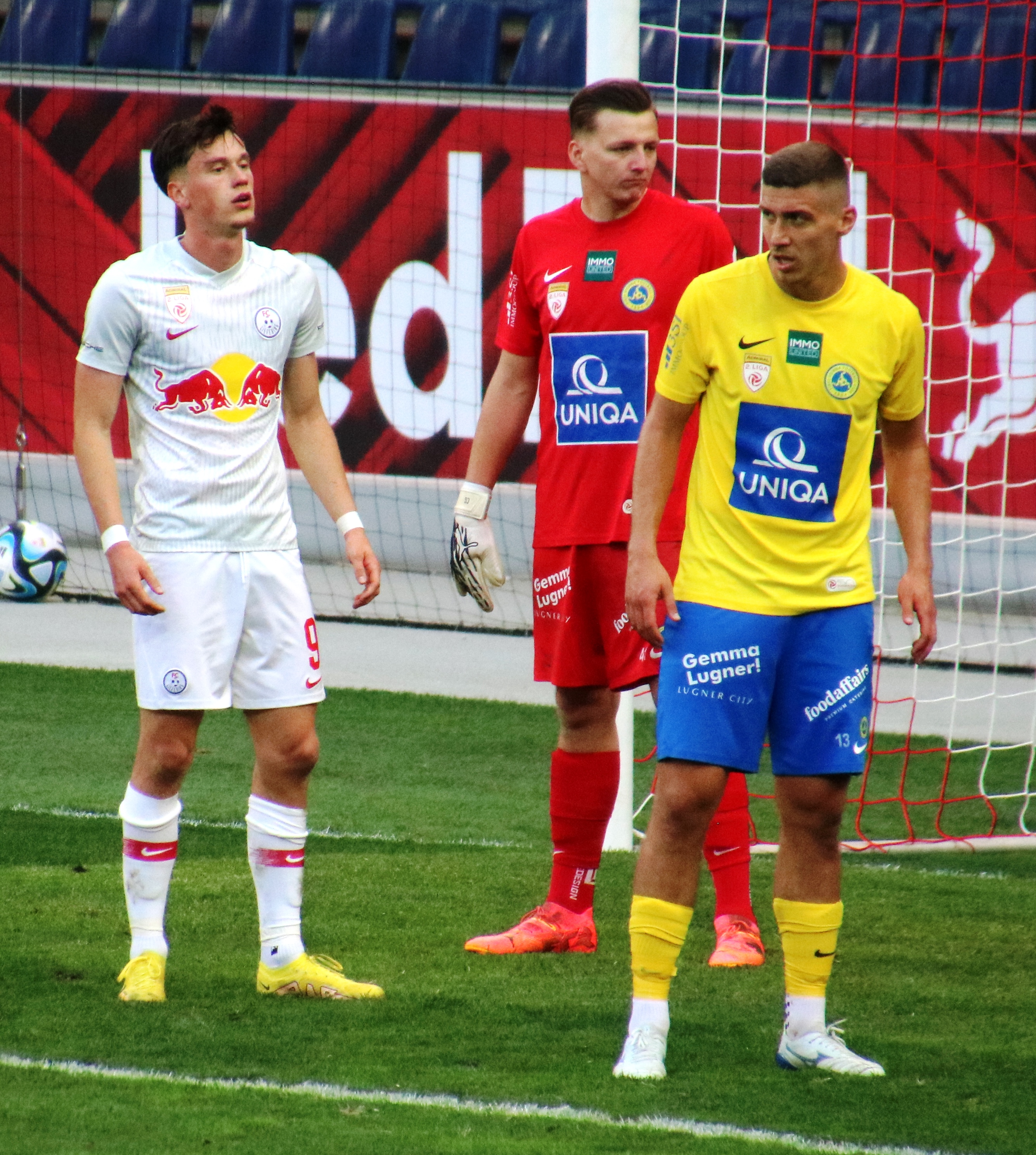
Anes Omerovic (right) playing for First Vienna in 2024

On 18 June 2021 he returned to Dornbirn.

On 7 January 2022, Omerovic signed with Vaduz in the Swiss Challenge League until June 2024.

== Career statistics ==
=== Club ===
As of match played 19 September 2026

Appearances and goals by club, season and competition
Club	Season	League			National cup (Note: Includes Austrian Cup, Swiss Cup, Liechtenstein Cup, Bosnian Cup)		Continental		Total	
Club	Season	Division	Apps	Goals	Apps	Goals	Apps	Goals	Apps	Goals
Young Violets	2017–18	Regionalliga	9	1	—		—		9	1
Dornbirn	2018–19	Regionalliga	11	2	—		—		11	2
Dornbirn	2019–20	Austrian First League	27	2	2	0	—		29	2
Dornbirn	Total		38	4	2	0	—		40	4
Winterthur	2020–21	Swiss Challenge League	19	0	2	0	—		21	0
Dornbirn	2021–22	Austrian First League	14	2	1	0	—		15	2
Vaduz	2021–22	Swiss Challenge League	13	1	2	1	—		15	2
Vaduz	2022–23	Swiss Challenge League	11	1	3	3	7 (Note: Appearances in UEFA Europa Conference League)	0	21	4
Vaduz	Total		24	2	5	4	7	0	36	6
First Vienna	2023–24	Austrian First League	28	2	2	0	—		30	2
First Vienna	2024–25	Austrian First League	29	1	2	0	—		31	1
First Vienna	Total		57	3	4	0	—		61	3
Velež Mostar	2025–26	Bosnian Premier League	5	1	1	0	—		6	1
Velež Mostar	2026–27	Bosnian Premier League	8	1	0	0	4	0	12	1
Velež Mostar	Total		13	2	1	0	4	0	18	2
Career total			174	14	15	4	11	0	200	18
