= 2023–24 Liechtenstein Cup =

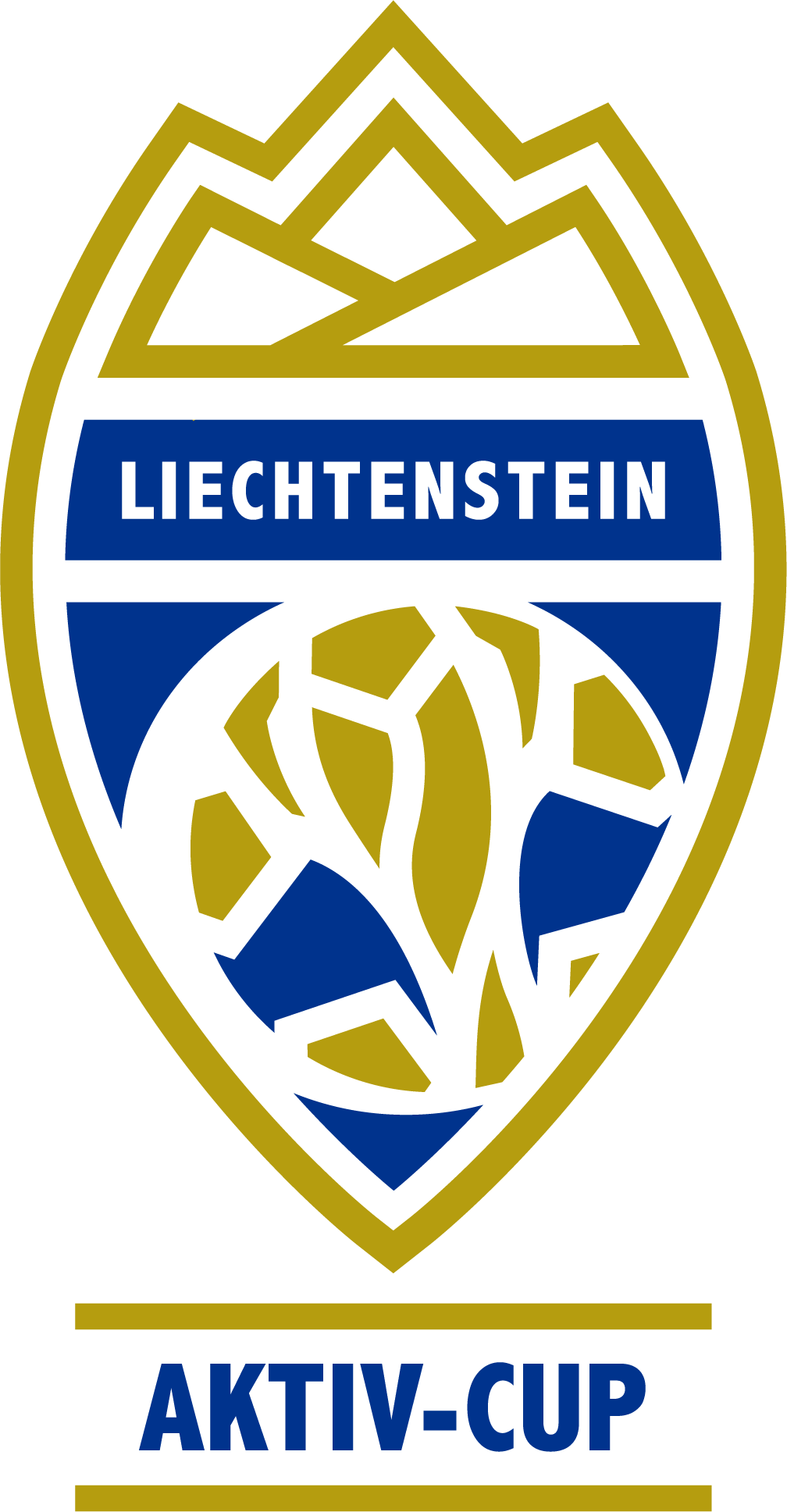

Tournament details
- Country: Liechtenstein
- Teams: 7 (and 10 reserve teams)

Final positions
- Champions: Vaduz
- Runners-up: Triesenberg

Tournament statistics
- Matches played: 16
- Goals scored: 70 (4.38 per match)

The 2023–24 Liechtenstein Cup was the 79th season of Liechtenstein's annual cup competition. The winners qualified for the second qualifying round of the 2024–25 UEFA Conference League.

Vaduz won the cup on 8 May 2024 (their tenth consecutive Liechtenstein Cup win and fiftieth overall), defeating Triesenberg 5–0 in the final.

== Participating clubs ==
2023–24 Swiss Challenge League (2nd tier)	2023–24 1. Liga (4th tier)	2023–24 2. Liga (6th tier)	2023–24 3. Liga (7th tier)	2023–24 4. Liga (8th tier)	2023–24 5. Liga (9th tier)
Vaduz ^{TH}	Balzers; Eschen/Mauren	Vaduz II	Eschen/Mauren II; Ruggell; Schaan; Triesen; Triesenberg	Balzers II; Eschen/Mauren III; Ruggell II; Triesen II; Vaduz III	Schaan II; Triesenberg II; Triesen III

^{TH} Title holders.

== Pre-qualification ==
Two “third” teams entered the pre-qualification round.

Team 1	Score	Team 2
11 August 2023
Triesen III (9)	0–3	Vaduz III (8)

== Round of 16 ==
The pre-qualification winners and remaining 15 teams entered the Round of 16.

Team 1	Score	Team 2
22 August 2023
Ruggell (7)	1–8	Vaduz (2)
Schaan (7)	1–2	Eschen/Mauren (4)
Eschen/Mauren II (7)	1–2 (a.e.t.)	Triesen (7)
Triesen II (8)	0–8	Triesenberg (7)
23 August 2023
Vaduz II (6)	0–1	Balzers (4)
Schaan II (9)	6–1	Triesenberg II (9)
29 August 2023
Ruggell II (8)	2–0	Balzers II (8)
15 September 2023
Vaduz III (8)	2–2 (a.e.t.) (5–4 p)	Eschen/Mauren III (8)

== Quarter-finals ==
The quarter-finals consisted of the 8 Round of 16 winners.

Team 1	Score	Team 2
24 October 2023
Ruggell II (8)	1–2 (a.e.t.)	Triesenberg (7)
Vaduz III (8)	1–6	Balzers (4)
Schaan II (9)	1–4	Triesen (7)
25 October 2023
Eschen/Mauren (4)	1–2 (a.e.t.)	Vaduz (2)

== Semi-finals ==
The semi-finals consisted of the four quarter-final winners.

Team 1	Score	Team 2
9 April 2024
Balzers (4)	0–5	Vaduz (2)
Triesenberg (7)	2–0	Triesen (7)

== Final ==
The final consisted of the two semi-final winners.

8 May 2024
19:00

Vaduz	5–0	Triesenberg
Golliard 3', 32'; Djokic 9', 58', 88'	Report

Rheinpark Stadion, Vaduz
Attendance: 1,632
Referee: Marijan Drmic (Switzerland)
