= Lars Traber =

Liechtenstein footballer (born 2000)

Personal information
- Full name: Lars Mika Traber
- Date of birth: 12 June 2000 (age 26)
- Place of birth: Rorschach, Switzerland
- Position: Defender

Team information
- Current team: Brühl
- Number: 28

Youth career
- –2017: FC Romanshorn
- 2017–2019: St. Gallen

Senior career*
Years	Team	Apps	(Gls)
2019–2020	Wil	9	(0)
2020–2022	Brühl	47	(2)
2022–2025	Vaduz	66	(4)
2025–	Brühl	27	(3)

International career^{‡}
2022–	Liechtenstein	31	(0)
- * Club domestic league appearances and goals as of 28 September 2026 ‡ National team caps and goals as of 15:12, 1 October 2026 (UTC)

Lars Traber (born 12 June 2000) is a professional footballer who plays as a defender for Swiss Promotion League club Brühl. Born in Switzerland, he represents the Liechtenstein national team.

== Club career ==
Traber moved from the youth sides of St. Gallen to FC Wil in summer 2019. He went on to make nine appearances for the club in the Swiss Challenge League before his contract was terminated by mutual consent in August 2020. He subsequently signed for Swiss Promotion League club SC Brühl.

It was announced on 13 June 2022 that Traber would be joining FC Vaduz on a free transfer.

Traber returned to Brühl in the 2025 summer transfer window.

== International career ==
Born in Switzerland, Traber is of Liechtenstein descent through his grandmother. He received his Liechtenstein passport in early March 2022. Shortly thereafter he was named to Liechtenstein's squad for friendlies against Cape Verde and the Faroe Islands in Spain. He went on to make his senior international in the match against Cape Verde on 25 March.

=== International statistics ===
As of match played 1 October 2026

Liechtenstein
Year	Apps	Goals
2022	4	0
2023	9	0
2024	5	0
2025	6	0
2026	7	0
Total	31	0
