= Tresor Samba =

Swiss association football player (born 2002)

Personal information
- Date of birth: 8 June 2002 (age 24)
- Place of birth: Zurich, Switzwerland
- Height: 1.83 m (6 ft 0 in)
- Position: Forward

Team information
- Current team: Biel-Bienne
- Number: 11

Youth career
- -2022: Basel

Senior career*
Years	Team	Apps	(Gls)
2022–2024	Bellinzona	62	(11)
2024–2025	Thun	17	(1)
2025–2026	Liepāja	27	(2)
2026	Étoile Carouge	9	(0)
2026–	Biel-Bienne	2	(1)

International career^{‡}
2022–2023	Switzerland U20	4	(1)
- * Club domestic league appearances and goals as of 19 September 2026 ‡ National team caps and goals as of 28 March 2023

Tresor Samba (born 8 June 2002) is a Swiss professional footballer who plays for Swiss Promotion League club Biel-Bienne.

== Career ==
A product of the youth academy at FC Basel, he scored 17 goals in 19 appearances for their U21 side prior to joining AC Bellinzona in January 2022. For them, he scored five goals in 13 matches in the second half of the 2021-22 season to help them gain promotion to the Swiss Challenge League. In two-and-a-half seasons with Bellinzona he scored a total of eleven goals in 62 appearances.

In June 2024, he joined FC Thun on a two-year contract. He made his league debut for FC Thun on 19 July 2024 away against FC Aarau.

== Personal life ==
He is of Angolan descent.
