= Anthony Goelzer =

French footballer (born 1998)

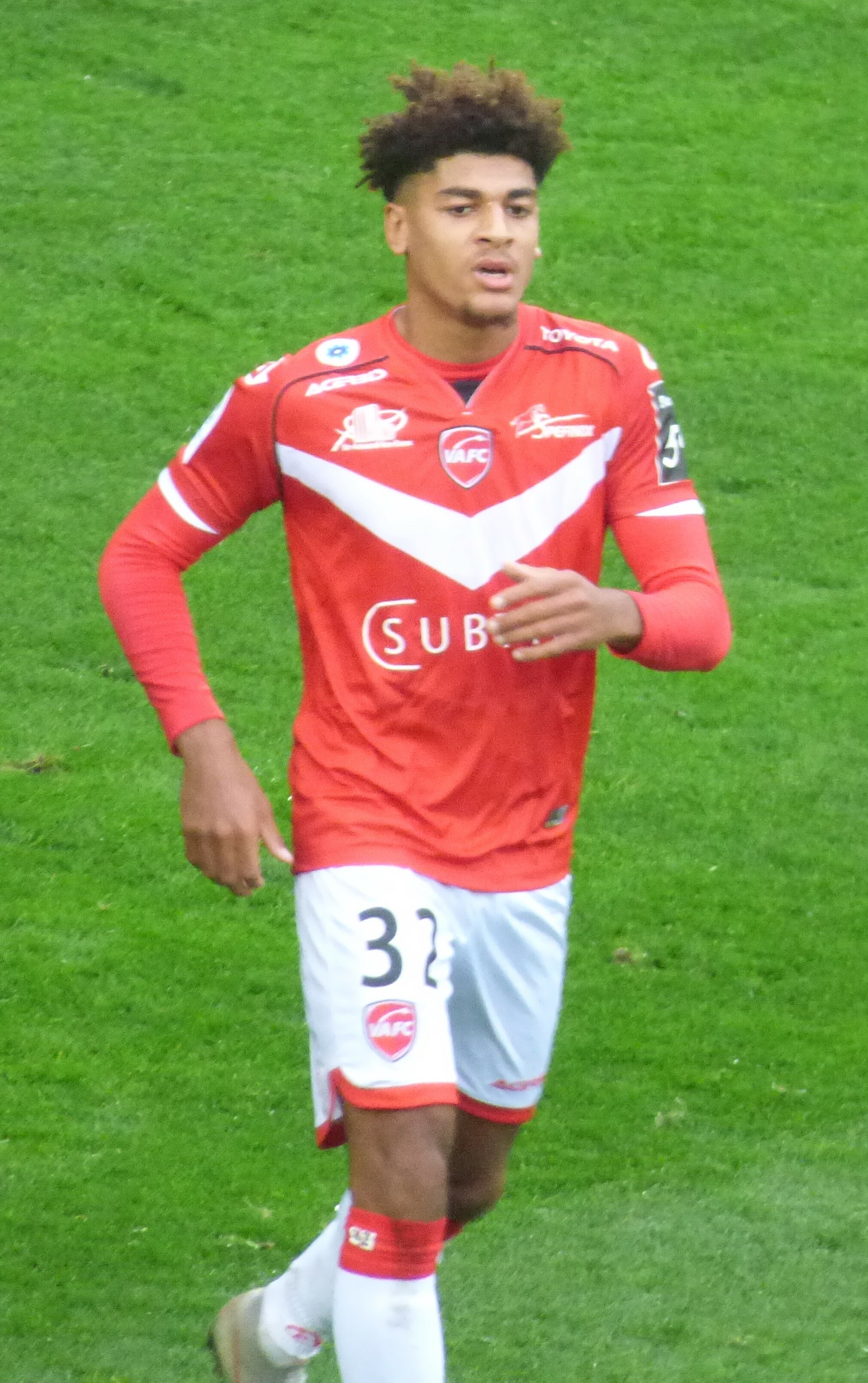
- Goelzer with Valenciennes in 2018

Personal information
- Full name: Anthony Didier Thomas Goelzer
- Date of birth: 12 September 1998 (age 28)
- Place of birth: Lille, France
- Height: 1.82 m (6 ft 0 in)
- Position: Left-back

Team information
- Current team: Valenciennes II

Youth career
- –2018: Valenciennes

Senior career*
Years	Team	Apps	(Gls)
2015–2019	Valenciennes II	4	(0)
2018–2019	Valenciennes	7	(0)
2019–2021	Grasshoppers	6	(0)
2021–2022	Kriens	8	(0)
2022–2023	Vaduz	14	(1)
2024	Olympique Marcquois	6	(0)
2024–	Valenciennes II	10	(1)
- * Club domestic league appearances and goals as of 19 June 2023

Anthony Didier Thomas Goelzer (born 12 September 1998) is a French professional footballer who plays as a left-back for Championnat National 3 club Valenciennes II.

== Club career ==
In February 2019, he signed a four-year contract with Grasshopper Zürich.

On 29 July 2021, he moved to Kriens, also in Switzerland.

After one season with Kriens, Goelzer signed for Vaduz, and became part of the history-making squad that became the first team from Liechtenstein to reach the group stages of a European club competition. He scored Vaduz's first ever group stage goal, in a 4-1 defeat against AZ in the Netherlands.
