= 2022–23 Liechtenstein Cup =

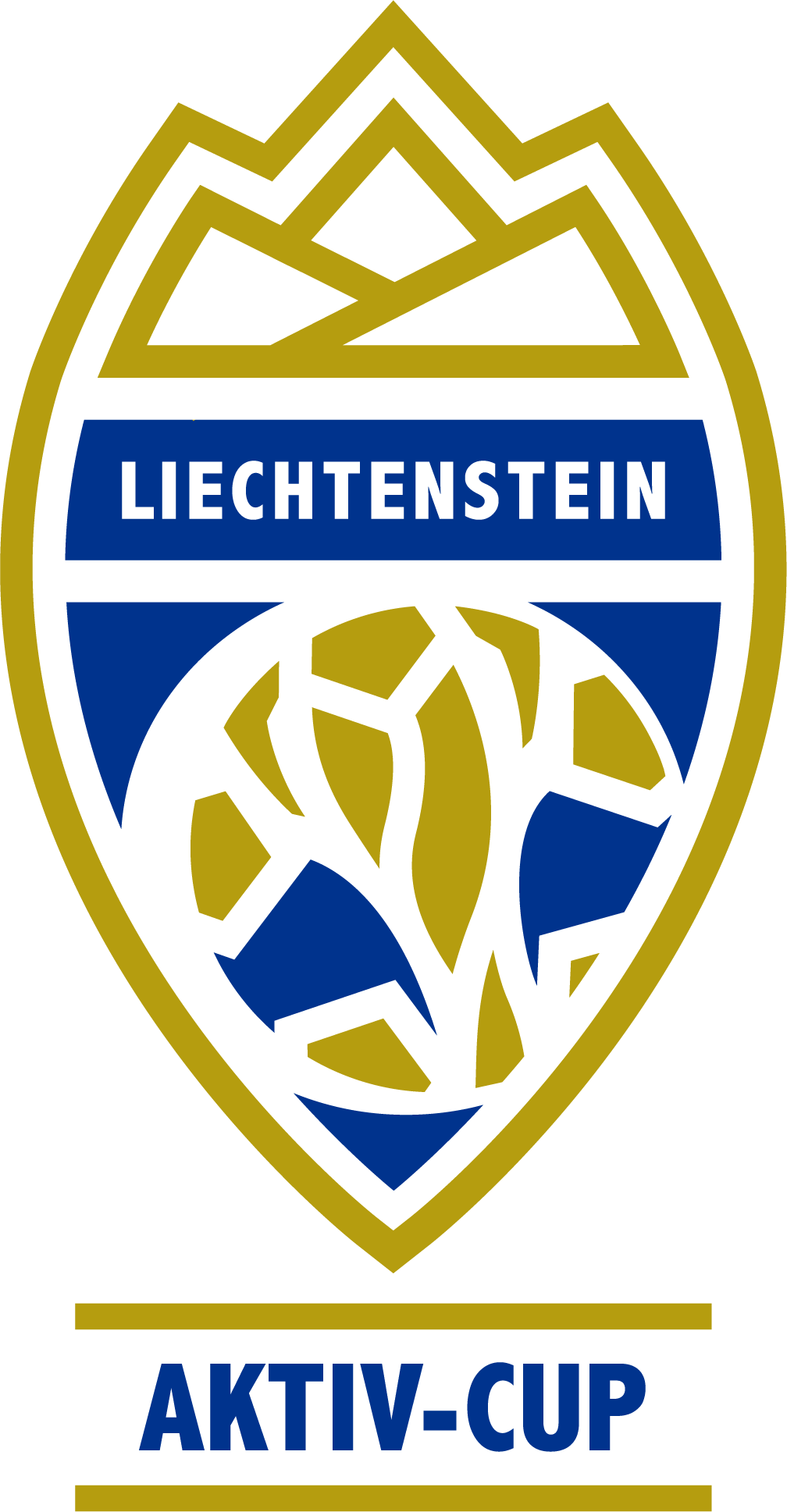

Tournament details
- Country: Liechtenstein
- Teams: 7 (and 10 reserve teams)

Final positions
- Champions: FC Vaduz
- Runners-up: FC Balzers

Tournament statistics
- Matches played: 16
- Goals scored: 96 (6 per match)

The 2023–23 Liechtenstein Cup was the 78th season of Liechtenstein's annual cup competition. Seven clubs competed with a total of 17 teams for one spot in the first qualifying round of the 2023–24 UEFA Europa Conference League. FC Vaduz were the defending champions.

== Participating clubs ==
2022–23 Swiss Challenge League (2nd tier)	2022–23 1. Liga (4th tier)	2022–23 2. Liga Interregional (5th tier)	2022–23 2. Liga (6th tier)	2022–23 3. Liga (7th tier)	2022–23 4. Liga (8th tier)	2022–23 5. Liga (9th tier)
FC Vaduz ^{TH}	USV Eschen/Mauren	FC Balzers	FC Vaduz II	FC Balzers II; USV Eschen/Mauren II; FC Ruggell; FC Schaan; FC Triesen; FC Triesenberg	USV Eschen/Mauren III; FC Ruggell II; FC Triesen II; FC Vaduz III	FC Schaan II; FC Triesenberg II; FC Triesen III

^{TH} Title holders.

== Pre-qualification ==
The pre-qualification round contained all three "third" teams (FC Triesen III, FC Vaduz III, and USV Eschen/Mauren III) with the final team drawn being given a bye to the round of 16

Team 1	Score	Team 2
8 August 2022
FC Triesen III (9)	0–5	USV Eschen/Mauren III (8)

== Round of 16 ==
The round of 16 was drawn on 5 August. Teams that compete in the 1. Liga or higher (currently FC Vaduz and USV Eschen/Mauren) were seeded, whilst all other teams remained unseeded. All teams that avoided pre-qualification were entered into the competition at this stage

Team 1	Score	Team 2
16 August 2022
FC Vaduz III (8)	1–6	FC Schaan (7)
FC Ruggell II (8)	1–1 (a.e.t.) (4–5 p)	FC Vaduz II (6)
FC Triesenberg (7)	5–3	FC Triesen (7)
USV Eschen/Mauren II (7)	0–9	FC Balzers (5)
17 August 2022
FC Ruggell (7)	1–4	USV Eschen/Mauren (4)
FC Schaan II (9)	3–7	USV Eschen/Mauren III (8)
FC Triesenberg II (9)	1–4	FC Balzers II (7)
31 August 2022
FC Triesen II (8)	0–18	FC Vaduz (2)

== Quarter-finals ==
The quarter finals were drawn on 1 September 2022. Due to FC Vaduz qualifying for the UEFA Europa Conference League group stage, their match against USV Eschen Mauren III was rescheduled, instead taking place during the international break.

Team 1	Score	Team 2
20 September 2022
USV Eschen Mauren III (8)	0–8	FC Vaduz (2)
11 October 2022
FC Balzers II (7)	3–2	FC Schaan (7)
12 October 2022
FC Vaduz II (6)	0–3	FC Balzers (5)
FC Triesenberg (7)	0–1	USV Eschen/Mauren (4)

== Semi-finals ==
The semi-finals involved the four teams who won in the quarter-final round.

Team 1	Score	Team 2
15 March 2023
FC Balzers II (7)	0–3	FC Balzers (5)
5 April 2023
USV Eschen/Mauren (4)	1–2 (a.e.t.)	FC Vaduz (2)

== Final ==
17 May 2023
19:00

FC Balzers	0–4	FC Vaduz
	Report	Gasser 41'; Cicek 70' (pen.); Traber 77'; Väyrynen 88'

Rheinpark Stadion, Vaduz
Attendance: 1,298
Referee: David Schärli (Switzerland)
