= Cédric Gasser =

Swiss footballer (born 1998)

Personal information
- Full name: Cédric Pascal Gasser
- Date of birth: 16 February 1998 (age 28)
- Place of birth: Münsingen, Switzerland
- Height: 1.76 m (5 ft 9 in)
- Position: Defender

Youth career
- 2012–2018: FC St. Gallen

Senior career*
Years	Team	Apps	(Gls)
2017–2018	FC St. Gallen	7	(0)
2018–2019	→ FC Wil (loan)	17	(0)
2019–2026	FC Vaduz	174	(7)

International career^{‡}
2018	Switzerland U20	5	(0)
- * Club domestic league appearances and goals as of 26 May 2026 ‡ National team caps and goals as of 04:28, 11 May 2021 (UTC)

Cédric Pascal Gasser (born 16 February 1998) is a Swiss footballer who plays as a defender.

== Club career ==
=== FC St. Gallen ===
==== 2017–2018 season ====
Having played for St. Gallen's, youth teams for several years, Gasser was first named for a senior team squad on 30 November 2017, where he was an unused substitute in a Swiss Cup match against Young Boys.

Gasser made his professional debut for St. Gallen in a 3-0 Swiss Super League win over FC Lugano on 25 February 2018 as an 87th-minute substitute. He made 7 league appearances this season, only starting 2 matches: a 2–3 loss to FC Luzern and a 0–3 loss to FC Lausanne.

==== 2018-2019 Season: Loan to FC Wil ====
On 30 June 2018, Gasser was sent on a 1-season loan to FC Wil of the Swiss Challenge League. He made his debut on 3 August 2018 in a 2–1 win over Servette FC as a 93rd-minute substitute. After only making 5 appearances between August and the end of December, Gasser established himself as a first team regular in the following months, making 13 appearances from February to May. He finished the season with 17 league appearances for FC Wil, helping them to a 5th-placed finish.

=== FC Vaduz ===
==== 2019–2020 season ====
On 22 May 2019, it was confirmed that Gasser would be joining FC Vaduz on a free transfer once his contract with St. Gallen expired on 30 June. He made his Vaduz debut on 11 July in a 0–0 draw against Icelandic side Breiðablik in a Europa League 1st qualifying round match.

== International career ==
=== Switzerland U20 ===
Gasser made his under-20 debut on 10 September 2018, in a 1–0 win over Poland U20s. He made 4 further appearances for the U20s in October and November 2018, however he has not been included in any subsequent squads.
