= Tunahan Cicek =

Swiss footballer (born 1992)

Personal information
- Date of birth: 12 May 1992 (age 34)
- Place of birth: Arbon, Switzerland
- Height: 1.79 m (5 ft 10 1/2 in)
- Position: Forward

Team information
- Current team: Brühl
- Number: 17

Youth career
- FC Arbon 05

Senior career*
Years	Team	Apps	(Gls)
2010–2013	St. Gallen II	76	(15)
2010–2013	St. Gallen	6	(0)
2014–2014	Winterthur II	8	(3)
2014–2016	Winterthur	65	(12)
2016–2017	Boluspor	10	(0)
2017–2018	Schaffhausen	34	(21)
2018–2019	Neuchâtel Xamax	5	(0)
2019	→ Schaffhausen (loan)	17	(4)
2019–2023	Vaduz	150	(45)
2024	Boluspor	18	(1)
2024–2025	Batman Petrolspor	28	(2)
2025–	Brühl	40	(20)
- * Club domestic league appearances and goals as of 28 September 2026

Tunahan Cicek (Turkish: Çiçek; born 12 May 1992) is a Swiss professional footballer who plays for Promotion League club Brühl as a forward.

== Career ==
=== Vaduz ===
On 15 May 2019 FC Vaduz confirmed, that Cicek had joined the club on a 3-year contract.

=== Return to Boluspor ===
On 2 January 2024, Cicek signed a 1.5-year contract with Boluspor.

== Personal life ==
Born in Switzerland, Cicek is of Turkish descent.
