= 2023–24 Swiss Challenge League =

Swiss Challenge League
- Season: 2023–24
- Dates: 21 July 2023 – 20 May 2024
- Champions: Sion
- Promoted: Sion
- Relegated: Baden
- UEFA Conference League: Vaduz
- Matches: 180
- Top goalscorer: Dejan Sorgić (Sion); 16 goals
- Biggest home win: 6–0; THU–BAD (4 Aug '23); VAD–SHA (3 Sep '23)
- Biggest away win: 0–5; BAD–WIL (27 Aug '23)
- Highest scoring: 6–3; THU–VAD (3 Nov '23)
- Longest winning run: Sion (7 wins)
- Longest unbeaten run: Sion (17 games)
- Longest winless run: Vaduz (12 games)
- Longest losing run: Baden (7 losses)
- All statistics correct as of 31 May 2024.

The 2023–24 Swiss Challenge League (referred to as the Dieci Challenge League for sponsoring reasons) is the 126th season of the second tier of competitive football in Switzerland and the 21st season under its current name.

== Overview ==
=== Teams ===
Due to the increased number of teams in the Super League, from ten to twelve, two teams were directly promoted at the end of the last season and no teams were directly relegated, but third and last placed teams advanced to a promotion and relegation play-off, respectively. The remaining six teams were joined by the best placed eligible teams of the 2022–23 Swiss Promotion League, runners-up Stade Nyonnais and third-placed FC Baden, Stade Nyonnais and Baden returned to second tier after 11 and 17 years absence respectively. Last season's last placed team Neuchâtel Xamax FCS remains in the Challenge League as winners of the relegation play-off. FC Sion, as losers of the promotion play-off, returned to the Challenge League after 17 years in the Super League.

=== Schedule ===
The Swiss Football League (SFL) released a detailed schedule on 7 December 2022. The season will begin on 21 July 2023 and conclude on 20 May 2024. As before, the league will go on winter break after matchday 18 on 17 December 2023 and resume on 26 January 2024. Promotion play-offs are scheduled for the week following the final matchday. The two legs of the promotion play-offs are scheduled for 26 and 31 May 2024, respectively.

The fixtures of the first 18 rounds were drawn and published on 21 June 2023, together with the match times for the first nine rounds. Matches of European competitors FC Vaduz may be postponed to Sundays in rounds 7, 8, and 9, subject to their performance in the UEFA Europa Conference League qualifying.

== Teams ==
=== Stadia and locations ===
Locations of clubs in the 2023–24 Swiss Challenge League teams

Team	Location	Stadium	Capacity	Ref
FC Aarau	Aarau	Stadion Brügglifeld	8,000	
FC Baden	Fislisbach	Esp Stadium	7,000	
AC Bellinzona	Bellinzona	Stadio Comunale	5,000	
FC Stade Nyonnais	Nyon	Stade de Colovray	7,200	
FC Schaffhausen	Schaffhausen	Berformance Arena	8,200	
FC Sion	Sion	Stade Tourbillon	14,283	
FC Thun	Thun	Stockhorn Arena	10,014	
FC Vaduz	(Liechtenstein) Vaduz	Rheinpark Stadion	7,584	
FC Wil 1900	Wil	Lidl Arena	6,958	
Neuchâtel Xamax FCS	Neuchâtel	Stade de la Maladière	11,997	

=== Personnel and kits ===
Team	Manager	Captain	Kit manufacturer	Shirt sponsor
Aarau	(Bosnia and Herzegovina) Ranko Jakovljević	(Switzerland) Olivier Jäckle	gpard	Credit Suisse
Baden	(Austria) Michael Winsauer	(Switzerland) Patrick Muff	macron	Badener Tagblatt
Bellinzona	(Spain) Manuel Benavente	(Switzerland) Matteo Tosetti	Acerbis	
Schaffhausen	(Germany) Christian Wimmer	(Switzerland) Serge Müller	Puma	Methabau
Sion	(France) Didier Tholot	(Switzerland) Reto Ziegler	Macron	OIKEN
Nyon	(France) Christophe Caschili	(Switzerland) Quentin Gaillard	Adidas	
Thun	(Switzerland) Mauro Lustrinelli	(Switzerland) Marco Bürki	Macron	Schneider Software AG
Vaduz	(Switzerland) Marc Schneider	(Liechtenstein) Benjamin Büchel	Puma	MBPI
Wil	(Italy) Brunello Iacopetta	(Switzerland) Kastrijot Ndau	ERIMA	Weber und Partner AG; LIKA Group AG
Xamax	(Switzerland) Uli Forte	(Slovenia) Kenan Fatkič	Puma	groupe e

=== Managerial changes ===
Team	Outgoing manager	Manner of departure	Date of departure	Position in table	Incoming manager	Date of appointment	Ref.
Aarau	(Switzerland) Boris Smiljanić	Departure	28 May 2023	Pre-season	(Switzerland) Alex Frei	12 June 2023	
Bellinzona	(Argentina) Fernando Cocimano (interim)	End of interim spell	13 June 2023	Pre-season	(Switzerland) Sandro Chieffo	13 June 2023	
Schaffhausen	(Switzerland) Selcuk Sasivari (interim)	End of interim spell	14 June 2023	Pre-season	(Switzerland) Bigi Meier	14 June 2023	
Sion	(Italy) Paolo Tramezzani	Departure	15 June 2023	Pre-season	(France) Didier Tholot	15 June 2023	
Bellinzona	(Switzerland) Sandro Chieffo	Sacked	3 October 2023	9th	(Spain) Mario Rosas	3 October 2023	
Schaffhausen	(Switzerland) Bigi Meier	Sacked	29 December 2023	10th	(Germany) Christian Wimmer	29 December 2023	
Vaduz	(Liechtenstein) Martin Stocklasa	Sacked	12 February 2024	8th	(Switzerland) Marc Schneider	14 February 2024	
Aarau	(Switzerland) Alex Frei	Departure	25 March 2024	3rd	(Bosnia and Herzegovina) Ranko Jakovljević (interim)	25 March 2024	

=== Number of teams by regions ===
No. of teams	Cantons	Team(s)
2	Aargau	Aarau, Baden
1
1	St. Gallen	Wil
1	Bern	Thun
1	Schaffhausen	Schaffhausen
1	Liechtenstein	FC Vaduz
1	Vaud	Nyon
1	Valais	Sion
1	Neuchâtel	Neuchâtel Xamax
1	Ticino	AC Bellinzona

== League table ==
Pos	Team	Pld	W	D	L	GF	GA	GD	Pts	Promotion, qualification or relegation
1	Sion (C, P)	36	23	10	3	72	23	+49	79	Promotion to Swiss Super League
2	Thun	36	23	7	6	73	38	+35	76	Qualification for promotion play-off
3	Vaduz	36	13	10	13	67	55	+12	49	Qualification for Conference League second qualifying round (Note: Vaduz qualified for the Conference League second qualifying round by winning the 2023–24 Liechtenstein Cup.)
4	Xamax	36	11	16	9	55	45	+10	49	
5	Wil	36	11	11	14	48	52	−4	44	
6	Aarau	36	12	7	17	53	59	−6	43	
7	Nyon	36	11	10	15	45	58	−13	43	
8	Bellinzona	36	11	9	16	37	50	−13	42	
9	Schaffhausen	36	8	14	14	36	55	−19	38	
10	Baden (R)	36	6	8	22	31	82	−51	26	Relegation to Swiss Promotion League

Source: Swiss Challenge League
Rules for classification: 1) Points; 2) Goal difference; 3) Goals scored; 4) Head-to-head goal difference; 5) Head-to-head goals scored 6) Away goals scored; 7) Draw.
(C) Champions; (P) Promoted; (R) Relegated

== Results ==
=== First and second rounds ===
Home \ Away	AAR	BAD	BEL	NYO	SHA	SIO	THU	VAD	WIL	XAM
Aarau	—	1–0	1–2	0–2	1–1	0–0	5–2	3–2	1–1	2–3
Baden	1–2	—	1–1	2–0	1–1	0–4	0–2	2–3	0–5	0–4
Bellinzona	1–3	3–1	—	1–0	0–0	1–2	0–3	0–4	0–2	1–0
Nyon	4–0	1–1	2–3	—	2–1	1–2	3–2	1–0	2–0	1–1
Schaffhausen	1–1	2–0	0–0	1–1	—	1–1	0–1	1–0	1–3	2–2
Sion	1–0	1–1	1–0	1–1	2–1	—	2–3	3–3	3–0	1–0
Thun	2–0	6–0	3–1	1–1	1–0	1–1	—	2–1	3–1	1–1
Vaduz	2–2	1–2	1–2	2–1	6–0	0–2	1–1	—	2–2	1–1
Wil	0–2	0–1	0–0	3–2	2–0	0–0	0–3	3–2	—	2–0
Xamax	2–1	1–2	1–1	1–1	3–0	0–3	4–0	1–1	2–2	—

Source: Swiss Football League
Legend: Blue = home team win; Yellow = draw; Red = away team win.

=== Third and fourth rounds ===
Home \ Away	AAR	BAD	BEL	NYO	SHA	SIO	THU	VAD	WIL	XAM
Aarau	—	2–0	0–2	5–2	1–2	1–2	3–0	1–0	0–4	2–0
Baden	0–1	—	2–1	2–3	0–1	0–3	1–5	1–1	2–1	2–2
Bellinzona	5–2	4–0	—	0–2	1–1	0–2	0–0	0–1	0–0	1–2
Nyon	4–3	1–0	1–3	—	0–3	0–4	0–0	0–2	1–1	0–2
Schaffhausen	1–1	2–2	2–1	1–1	—	0–4	1–1	0–1	3–2	1–1
Sion	2–0	4–1	3–0	1–0	3–0	—	1–2	2–2	4–0	1–1
Thun	1–0	3–1	1–0	4–1	3–0	1–0	—	6–3	2–1	4–0
Vaduz	2–1	6–0	2–2	1–3	3–2	1–2	1–0	—	3–1	5–3
Wil	1–1	3–1	4–1	0–0	0–1	1–4	0–3	1–0	—	0–0
Xamax	3–1	1–1	0–1	4–0	2–1	0–0	4–0	1–1	2–2	—

Source: Swiss Football League
Legend: Blue = home team win; Yellow = draw; Red = away team win.

== Promotion play-off ==
The relegation play-off will be played in a two-legged game between the eleventh placed team of the Super League (5th of the relegation group) and the second placed team of the Challenge League. The two legs of the relegation play-offs are scheduled for 26 and 31 May 2024, respectively.

The winner of the play-off is whichever teams scores most in both games (no away goals rule). In case of a tie at the end of the two games, 30 minutes of extra time (two times 15 minutes) are added, followed by a penalty shoot-out, in case the teams are still tied.

=== First leg ===
26 May 2024
16:30 CEST (UTC+2)

Grasshopper	1–1	Thun
Morandi 90+7' (pen.)	Report	52' Gutbub

Letzigrund, Zürich
Attendance: 9,045
Referee: Sandro Schärer

=== Second leg ===
31 May 2024
20:30 CEST (UTC+2)

Thun	1–2	Grasshopper
Koné 43' (pen.) (red card) 90+4'	Report	3' Morandi; 90+1' Abubakar

Stockhorn Arena, Thun
Attendance: 10,014
Referee: Urs Schnyder

Grasshopper wins 3–2 on aggregate.

== Attendances ==
#	Football club	Home games	Average attendance
1	FC Sion	18	6,542
2	FC Aarau	18	4,840
3	FC Thun	18	3,951
4	Neuchâtel Xamax	18	3,404
5	FC Baden	18	2,207
6	FC Wil	18	1,611
7	FC Vaduz	18	1,516
8	FC Schaffhausen	18	1,338
9	AC Bellinzona	18	836
10	Stade Nyonnais	18	781
