= 2024–25 FC Wil season =

FC Wil
2024–25 season
- Manager: Marco Hämmerli
- Stadium: Sportpark Bergholz
- Swiss Challenge League: 8th
- Swiss Cup: Pre-season

The 2024–25 season is the 125th season in the history of FC Wil, and the club's 21st consecutive season in the Swiss Challenge League. In addition to the domestic league, the team is scheduled to participate in the Swiss Cup.

On 24 May, Marco Hämmerli was unveiled as head coach.

== Transfers ==
=== In ===
Pos.	Player	Transferred from	Fee	Date	Source
FW	(Switzerland) Simone Rapp	(Switzerland) Neuchâtel Xamax	Free	1 July 2024	
FW	(Canada) Ayo Akinola	Free agent		3 July 2024	

=== Out ===
Pos.	Player	Transferred to	Fee	Date	Source
FW	(France) Hussayn Touati	(Switzerland) Servette	Loan return	30 June 2024	

== Friendlies ==
22 June 2024 Friendly	Zürich (Switzerland)	5–4	(Switzerland) Wil	Bauma
11:00	Reichmuth 21' 45'; Marchesano 39' (pen.); Labinot Bajrami 66'; Mile Vukelic 70'	Report	Staubli 13'; Simon Geiger 63'; Maier 90+10'; Ruben Dantas 90+12'	Stadium: Sportanlage Schwendi

28 June 2024 Friendly	Freiburg II (Germany)	0–1	(Switzerland) Wil	Eggingen
14:00		Report		Stadium: Sportplatz Eggingen

6 July 2024 Friendly	Brühl (Switzerland)	1–5	(Switzerland) Wil
11:00		Report

12 July 2024 Friendly	Wil (Switzerland)	0–0	(Switzerland) Cham	Wil
19:30		Report		Stadium: Lidl Arena

13 July 2024 Friendly	Young Boys (Switzerland)	1–3	(Switzerland) Wil	Bern
	Chaiwa 50'	Report	Rapp 17'; Felipe Borges 20' 28'	Stadium: Stadion Wankdorf

5 September 2024 Friendly	Austria Lustenau	1–0	(Switzerland) Wil	Lustenau
	Chabbi 79'	Report		Stadium: Reichshofstadion

14 November 2024 Friendly	Rheindorf Altach (Austria)	2–1	(Switzerland) Wil	Altach
11:30	Gebauer 7' 12'	Report	Mats Hanke 25'	Stadium: CASHPOINT Arena

16 January 2025 Friendly	Lugano (Switzerland)	2–2	(Switzerland) Wil	Gentilino
14:30	Babić 74' 77'	Report	Luan Abazi 59' 68' (pen.)	Stadium: Centro Sportivo Collina d'Oro

19 January 2025 Friendly	Wil (Switzerland)	3–1	(Switzerland) Zurich U21	Wil
11:00		Report		Stadium: Lidl Arena

== Competitions ==
=== Overall record ===
Competition	First match	Last match	Starting round	Record							
Competition	First match	Last match	Starting round	Pld	W	D	L	GF	GA	GD	Win %
Swiss Challenge League	20 July 2024		Matchday 1	2	0	1	1	3	4	−1	0.00
Swiss Cup	16 August 2024			0	0	0	0	0	0	+0	—
Total				2	0	1	1	3	4	−1	0.00

Last updated: 26 July 2024
Source: Soccerway

=== Swiss Challenge League ===
==== League table ====
Pos	Team	Pld	W	D	L	GF	GA	GD	Pts	Promotion, qualification or relegation
3	Étoile Carouge	36	15	9	12	57	46	+11	54	
4	Lausanne Ouchy	36	14	11	11	54	43	+11	53	
5	Wil	36	14	11	11	60	55	+5	53	
6	Vaduz	36	13	12	11	48	49	−1	51	Qualification for Conference League second qualifying round (Note: Vaduz qualified for the Conference League second qualifying round by winning the 2024–25 Liechtenstein Cup.)
7	Bellinzona (Note: Bellinzona were deducted 3 points on 16 December 2024 (confirmed on 22 January 2025), for failing to report social contribution payments. This decision was partially overturned by CAS on 25 April 2025 (Bellinzona are still fined SFr 30,000).)	36	11	11	14	47	60	−13	44	

Source: Swiss Challenge League
Rules for classification: 1) Points; 2) Goal difference; 3) Goals scored; 4) Head-to-head goal difference; 5) Head-to-head goals scored 6) Away goals scored; 7) Draw.

==== Results summary ====
Overall								Home						Away					
Pld	W	D	L	GF	GA	GD	Pts	W	D	L	GF	GA	GD	W	D	L	GF	GA	GD
33	12	11	10	53	49	+4	47	5	8	4	27	26	+1	7	3	6	26	23	+3

Last updated: 4 May 2025.
Source: soccerway

==== Results by round ====
Round	1	2	3	4	5	6	7	8	9	10	11	12	13	14	15	16	17	18	19	20	21	22	23	24	25	26	27	28	29	30	31	32	33	34	35	36
Ground	A	H	A	H	H	A	A	H	A	H	A	H	A	H	A	H	A	H	A	H	A	H	H	A	A	H	A	H	A	H	A	H	H	A	H	A
Result	L	D	L	L	W	L	D	D	W	D	L	D	W	D	D	W	W	L	D	W	L	W	L	L	W	D	W	L	W	D	L	D	W			
Position	9	7	4	7	3	6	5	5	5	5	7	7	5	6	7	5	4	5	5	4	5	5	5	5	4	5	4	5	5	4	6	5	4			

Updated to match(es) played on 4 May 2025. Source: worldfootball
A = Away; H = Home; W = Win; D = Draw; L = Loss

==== Matches ====
The match schedule was released on 18 June 2024.

20 July 2024 1	Bellinzona	2–1	Wil	Bellinzona
18:00	Nivokazi 33', (yellow card) 46'; Sauter (yellow card) 35'; Chacón (yellow card) 54'; L'Ghoul (yellow card) 71'; Nkama 85'; Sörensen (yellow card) 90+5'		Borges 9'; Ndau (yellow card) 57'; Maier (yellow card) 58'	Stadium: Stadio Comunale Bellinzona; Referee: Mirel Turkes

26 July 2024 2	Wil	2–2	Aarau	Wil
20:15	Ndau 13' (pen.), (yellow card) 70'; Borges 9'		Ernest (yellow card) 39', (goal) 61'; Dickenmann (yellow card) 45+1' (yellow-red card) 73'; Avdyli 55'	Stadium: Sportpark Bergholz; Attendance: 1,534; Referee: Tobias Thies

4 August 2024 3	Vaduz	3–2	Wil	Vaduz
14:15 CEST	Fabrizio Cavegn 48'; Liridon Berisha (yellow card) 84'; Mischa Eberhard 87'; Simani 90+3'	Report	Felipe Borges 40'; Guzzo (yellow card) 45+4'; Ruben Dantas Fernandes 59'; Philipp Altmann (yellow card) 62'; Mats Hanke (yellow card) 67'; Abdullah Laidani (yellow card) 82'; Akinola (yellow card) 89'	Stadium: Rheinpark Stadium; Attendance: 1,299; Referee: (Switzerland) Mirel Turkes

10 August 2024 4	Wil	0–3	Stade Nyonnais	Wil
18:00 CEST	Kastrijot Ndau (yellow card) 86'	Report	Elias Pasche 39' 45+1' (yellow card) 54'; Darian Yana 47'; Badara Diomandé (yellow card) 72'	Stadium: Lidl Arena; Attendance: 1,167; Referee: (Switzerland) Maxime Odiet

23 August 2024 5	Wil	4–0	Xamax	Wil
20:15 CEST	Staubli 14'; Kastrijot Ndau (yellow card) 25' (goal) 69' (pen.); Ruben Dantas Fernandes (yellow card) 43'; Jacovic (yellow card) 48'; Rapp 54' 60' (yellow card) 64'; Cueni (yellow card) 84'; Jason Parente (yellow card) 90+4'	Report	Omeragić (yellow card) 69'; Ramizi (yellow card) 84'; Hajrović (yellow card) 87'	Stadium: Lidl Arena; Attendance: 1,494; Referee: (Switzerland) Hajrim Qovanaj

30 August 2024 6	Étoile Carouge	3–1	Wil	Carouge
20:15 CEST	Vincent Nvendo 19'; Oscar Correia 61'; Camara (yellow card) 78'; Matheus Vieira 86'	Report	Cueni (yellow card) 28'; Jacovic (yellow card) 42'; Ruben Dantas Fernandes (yellow card) 69'; Jason Parente (yellow card) 71'; Akinola 75'	Stadium: Stade de la Fontenette; Attendance: 1,195; Referee: (Switzerland) Maxime Odiet

20 September 2024 7	Stade Lausanne Ouchy	0–0	Wil	Lausanne
19:30 CEST	Bayard (yellow card) 38'; Caddy (yellow card) 44'; N'Guessan (yellow card) 47'; Kadima (yellow card) 54'	Report	Jacovic (yellow card) 11'; Kastrijot Ndau (yellow card) 41'	Stadium: Stade Olympique de la Pontaise; Attendance: 475; Referee: (Switzerland) Désirée Grundbacher

23 September 2024 8	Wil	0–0	Thun	Wil
19:30 CEST	Akinola (yellow card) 87'	Report	Samba (yellow card) 74'; Bamert (yellow card) 87'	Stadium: Lidl Arena; Attendance: 1,391; Referee: (Switzerland) Marijan Drmic

27 September 2024 9	Schaffhausen	0–2	Wil	Schaffhausen
19:30 CEST	Noël Wetz (yellow card) 29'; Gabriele De Donno (yellow card) 45'	Report	Philipp Altmann (yellow card) 11'; Marwane Hajij 36'; Kastrijot Ndau (yellow card) 39'; Aaron Appiah 88'; Ruben Dantas Fernandes (yellow card) 90+1'	Stadium: FCS Arena Schaffhausen; Attendance: 1,173; Referee: (Switzerland) Marijan Drmic

5 October 2024 10	Wil	2–2	Stade Lausanne Ouchy	Wil
18:00 CET	Cueni (yellow card) 39'; Kastrijot Ndau 41' (yellow card) 84'; Akinola 45+1'; Simon Geiger (yellow card) 80'	Report	Heule (yellow card) 22' (goal) 37'; Nando Toggenburger 66'; Sahmkou Diaby Camara (yellow card) 71'; Fargues (yellow card) 78'	Stadium: Lidl Arena; Attendance: 1,081; Referee: (Switzerland) Hüseyin Sanli

18 October 2024 11	Stade Nyonnais	3–1	Wil	Nyon
19:30 CET	Luca Gazzetta (yellow card) 29'; Elias Pasche 72' (pen.); Aaron Appiah 77' (o.g.); Momodou Jaiteh 90+2'	Report	Marwane Hajij 11'; Staubli (yellow card) 23'; Maier (yellow card) 43'; Simon Geiger (yellow card) 63'; Ruben Dantas Fernandes (yellow card) 71'; Kastrijot Ndau (yellow card) 76'; Neziri (yellow card) 83'; Brahimi (yellow card) 83'	Stadium: Colovray Sports Centre; Attendance: 550; Referee: (Switzerland) Alessandro Dudic

27 October 2024 12	Wil	0–0	Vaduz	Wil
14:15 CET	Simon Geiger (yellow card) 78'; Rapp (yellow card) 81'	Report	Gasser (yellow card) 82'; Del Toro (yellow card) 90+3'	Stadium: Lidl Arena; Attendance: 1,756; Referee: (Switzerland) Sven Wolfensberger

1 November 2024 13	Xamax	1–4	Wil	Neuchâtel
19:30 CET	Ramizi (yellow card) 34'; Fabio Saiz 47'; Gonçalves (yellow card) 57'; Jonathan Fontana (yellow card) 60'; Giovani Bamba (yellow card) 73'; Hajrović (yellow card) 84'	Report	Maier 26' 69'; Akinola 82'; Jason Parente 90+1' (yellow card) 90+2'	Stadium: Stade de la Maladière; Attendance: 3,238; Referee: (Switzerland) David Schärli

10 November 2024 14	Wil	2–2	Schaffhausen	Wil
14:15 CET	Rebin Sulaka 21' (o.g.); Maier (yellow card) 86'; Rapp 90+3'	Report	Marc Giger 35' (yellow card) 83'; Pasadore (yellow card) 44'; Lika (yellow card) 46'; Iwan Hegglin (yellow card) 72'; Gabriele De Donno 84'; Gelmi (yellow card) 89'	Stadium: Lidl Arena; Attendance: 1,462; Referee: (Switzerland) Zrinko Prskalo

24 November 2024 15	Aarau	1–1	Wil	Aarau
14:15 CET	Marcin Dickenmann (yellow card) 51'; Derbaci 90+1'	Report	Maier 15'; Guzzo (yellow card) 24'; Simon Geiger (yellow card) 55'; Abdullah Laidani (yellow card) 76'; Aaron Appiah (yellow card) 83'	Stadium: Stadion Brügglifeld; Attendance: 4,911; Referee: (Switzerland) Marijan Drmic

30 November 2024 16	Wil	2–1	Étoile Carouge	Wil
18:00 CET	Cueni (yellow card) 16'; Akinola 29'; Staubli (yellow card) 53'; Neziri (yellow card) 54'; Guzzo (yellow card) 79'; Maier 86' (pen.)	Report	Oscar Correia 39'; Rüfli (yellow card) 90+2'	Stadium: Lidl Arena; Attendance: 793; Referee: (Switzerland) Logan Berchier

6 December 2024 17	Thun	0–2	Wil	Thun
20:15 CET	Gutbub (yellow card) 44'; Bertone (yellow card) 51'; Reichmuth (yellow card) 71'; Franke (yellow card) 77'; Balaruban (yellow card) 90+1'	Report	Marwane Hajij 11'; Kastrijot Ndau (yellow card) 21' (goal) 76' (pen.); Mats Hanke (yellow card) 90+3'	Stadium: Stockhorn Arena; Attendance: 3,245; Referee: (Switzerland) Hüseyin Sanli

14 December 2024 18	Wil	0–2	Bellinzona	Wil
18:00 CET	Cueni (yellow card) 60'; Philipp Altmann (yellow card) 71'	Report	Perrault Tokam (yellow card) 9'; Nivokazi 29' (yellow card) 52'; Krasniqi (yellow card) 70'; Chacón 78'	Stadium: Lidl Arena; Attendance: 1,241; Referee: (Switzerland) Deborah Anex

24 January 2025 19	Étoile Carouge	1–1	Wil	Carouge
20:15 CET	Oscar Correia 28'; Marculino Ninte (yellow card) 31'; Antonio Dominique (red card) 67'	Report	Akinola 1'; Kastrijot Ndau (yellow card) 51'	Stadium: Stade de la Fontenette; Attendance: 680; Referee: (Switzerland) Mirel Turkes

31 January 2025 20	Wil	2–0	Xamax	Wil
20:15 CET	Kastrijot Ndau (yellow card) 15'; Marwane Hajij 45+2'; Jacovic (yellow card) 61'; Maier 80'; Rapp (yellow card) 83'	Report	Giovani Bamba (yellow card) 9'; Mickael Facchinetti (yellow card) 83'	Stadium: Lidl Arena; Attendance: 1,041; Referee: (Switzerland) Maxime Odiet

9 February 2025 21	Vaduz	1–0	Wil	Vaduz
14:15 CET	Kaio Eduardo 3'; Mats Hammerich (yellow card) 70'; Traber (yellow card) 87'; Emini (yellow card) 90+2'	Report	Brahimi (yellow card) 45+1'; Neziri (yellow card) 63'; Rapp (yellow card) 67'; Maier (yellow card) 77'; Akinola (yellow card) 90+2'	Stadium: Rheinpark Stadion; Attendance: 1,486; Referee: (Switzerland) Marijan Drmic

15 February 2025 22	Wil	2–1	Stade Nyonnais	Wil
18:00 CET	Marwane Hajij 21'; Guzzo 50'; Staubli (yellow card) 73'	Report	Seydou Traore 13' (yellow card) 66'; Ethan Brandy (yellow card) 79'	Stadium: Lidl Arena; Attendance: 712; Referee: (Switzerland) Désirée Grundbacher

23 February 2025 23	Wil	2–3	Thun	Wil
14:15 CET	Maier 68'; Simon Geiger 90+3'	Report	Ibayi 38' (pen.); Genís Montolio (yellow card) 57' (goal) 60'; Fehr 73'	Stadium: Lidl Arena; Attendance: 1,548; Referee: (Switzerland) Luca Piccolo

28 February 2025 24	Stade Lausanne Ouchy	2–1	Wil	Lausanne
19:30 CET	Akichi (yellow card) 14'; Rupp (yellow card) 26' (yellow-red card) 29'; Caddy 31' (yellow card) 55'; Kayombo 37' (yellow card) 64'; Issa Kaloga (yellow card) 83'; da Silva (yellow card) 88'	Report	Kastrijot Ndau (yellow card) 27' (goal) 41' (pen.); Jacovic (yellow card) 60'	Stadium: Stade Olympique de la Pontaise; Attendance: 489; Referee: (Switzerland) Marijan Drmic

8 March 2025 25	Bellinzona	0–3	Wil	Bellinzona
18:00 CET	Johan Nkama (yellow card) 15'; Mihajlović (yellow card) 20'	Report	Simon Geiger 10' (yellow card) 79'; Akinola 31' (yellow card) 41' (goal) 82'; Akahomen (yellow card) 59'	Stadium: Stadio Comunale Bellinzona; Attendance: 847; Referee: (Switzerland) Jonathan Jaussi

16 March 2025 26	Wil	2–2	Aarau	Wil
14:15 CET	Rapp (yellow card) 17'; Maier 73'; Kastrijot Ndau (yellow card) 89'; Akahomen 90+6'	Report	Koide 1' 41'; Obexer (yellow card) 35'; Fazliu (yellow card) 52'; Marco Thaler (yellow card) 90'; Marvin Hübel (yellow card) 90+4'	Stadium: Lidl Arena; Attendance: 2,536; Referee: (Switzerland) Luca Piccolo

28 March 2025 27	Schaffhausen	1–3	Wil	Schaffhausen
19:30 CET	Nadjack (yellow card) 33'; Joel Berhane (yellow card) 59'; Chiappetta 63'; Valon Hamdiu (yellow card) 73'	Report	Schmid 3'; Akinola (yellow card) 33'; Maier 77'; Edis Bytyqi 90+2'	Stadium: FCS Arena Schaffhausen; Attendance: 926; Referee: (Switzerland) Mirel Turkes

1 April 2025 28	Wil	0–3	Vaduz	Wil
19:30 CET	Maier (yellow card) 12'; Kastrijot Ndau (yellow card) 37'; Guzzo (yellow card) 62'	Report	Malik Deme 16'; Traber (yellow card) 25'; Simon Geiger 35' (o.g.); Mats Hammerich (yellow card) 89'; Del Toro 90'	Stadium: Lidl Arena; Attendance: 1,165; Referee: (Switzerland) Maxime Odiet

4 April 2025 29	Stade Nyonnais	0–2	Wil	Nyon
19:30 CET	Quentin Gaillard (yellow card) 33'; Ivann Strohbach (yellow card) 90'	Report	Felipe Borges 16'; Rapp 66' (yellow card) 90'	Stadium: Colovray Sports Centre; Attendance: 523; Referee: (Switzerland) Jonathan Jaussi

13 April 2025 30	Wil	2–2	Étoile Carouge	Wil
14:15 CET	Jacovic (yellow card) 7'; Simon Geiger 12' (yellow card) 90+3'; Felipe Borges 13'; Akinola (yellow card) 18'; Edis Bytyqi (yellow card) 85'; Rapp (yellow card) 88'	Report	Zoukit 36'; Bruno Caslei (yellow card) 64'; Camara (yellow card) 71'; Oscar Correia 76'; Bonota Traoré (yellow card) 89'	Stadium: Lidl Arena; Attendance: 1,123; Referee: (Switzerland) Logan Berchier

21 April 2025 31	Thun	7–0	Wil	Thun
16:30 CET	Genís Montolio 3'; Castroman 11'; Janjičić (yellow card) 28'; Stewart 48'; Reichmuth 61'; Guzzo 64' (o.g.); Bertone 85'; Ibayi 90+1'	Report		Stadium: Stockhorn Arena; Attendance: 5,146; Referee: (Switzerland) Anojen Kanagasingam

27 April 2025 32	Wil	2–2	Bellinzona	Wil
14:15 CET	Edis Bytyqi (yellow card) 23'; Kastrijot Ndau 45' (pen.) (yellow card) 89'; Luan Abazi 66'; Jacovic (yellow card) 83'; Neziri (yellow card) 90+3'	Report	Krasniqi (yellow card) 36'; Sabbatini (yellow card) 43'; Johan Nkama 62' (yellow card) 67'; Nivokazi 71' (pen.)	Stadium: Lidl Arena; Attendance: 1,372; Referee: (Switzerland) Jonathan Jaussi

4 May 2025 33	Wil	3–1	Schaffhausen	Wil
14:15 CET	Kastrijot Ndau (yellow card) 21'; Schmid (yellow card) 23'; Crnovršanin (yellow card) 37'; Luan Abazi (yellow card) 41'; Jacovic (yellow card) 53'; Akinola 62'; Staubli 66'; Maier 71'	Report	Hoxha 10' (red card) 32'; Rossi (yellow card) 70'; Ben Schläppi (yellow card) 75'; Joel Berhane (yellow card) 78'	Stadium: Lidl Arena; Attendance: 1,386; Referee: (Switzerland) Zrinko Prskalo

9 May 2025 34	Aarau	–	Wil	Aarau
20:15 CET				Stadium: Stadion Brügglifeld

=== Swiss Cup ===
16 August 2024 First round	AC Taverne	1–3	Wil	Torricella-Taverne
20:00	Soufiane Bourkaa 77'	Report	Rapp 51'; Staubli 68' 70'	Stadium: Campo comunale Taverne; Referee: (Switzerland) David Huwiler

14 September 2024 Second round	Wil	2–2 (a.e.t.) (2–4 p)	Winterthur	Wil
18:00	Rapp 64'; Aaron Appiah 105'	Report	Di Giusto 10'; Arnold 116'	Stadium: Lidl Arena; Attendance: 4,046; Referee: (Switzerland) Lukas Fähndrich
