= 2024–25 Neuchâtel Xamax FCS season =

Neuchâtel Xamax FCS
2024–25 season
- Manager: Ulrich Forte
- Stadium: Stade de la Maladière
- Swiss Challenge League: 4th
- Swiss Cup: First round
- Highest home attendance: 3,428 vs Stade Lausanne Ouchy
- Biggest win: FC Aarau 1–3 Neuchâtel Xamax

The 2024–25 season is the 55th season in the history of Neuchâtel Xamax FCS, and the club's fifth consecutive season in the Swiss Challenge League. In addition to the domestic league, the team is scheduled to participate in the Swiss Cup.

== Transfers ==
=== In ===
Pos.	Player	Transferred from	Fee	Date	Source
FW	(France) Hussayn Touati	(Switzerland) Servette	Undisclosed	1 July 2024	
FW	(Nigeria) Paschal Onyekachi Durugbor	(Nigeria) Sporting Lagos FC	Free	11 July 2024	
GK	(Switzerland) Edin Omeragić	(Switzerland) Servette	Undisclosed	13 July 2024	
GK	(Democratic Republic of the Congo) Anthony Ngawi	(Switzerland) FC Baden		18 July 2024	

=== Out ===
Pos.	Player	Transferred to	Fee	Date	Source
FW	(Switzerland) Simone Rapp	(Switzerland) Neuchâtel Xamax	Contract termination	1 July 2024	
DF	(Sweden) Mirza Mujčić	(Faroe Islands) NSÍ Runavík		1 July 2024	
GK	(France) Théo Guivarch	(France) Clermont Foot	Undisclosed	17 July 2024	

== Friendlies ==
10 October 2024 Friendly	Grasshopper (Switzerland)	6-0	(Switzerland) Xamax
14:00 CET	Lee 13' 22'; Mabil 52'; Schmitz 55'; Yannick Bettkober 62'; Bojang 81' (pen.)	Report

11 January 2025 Friendly	Xamax (Switzerland)	2-3	(Switzerland) Biel-Bienne
11:00 CET	52'; 78'	Report	73'; 87'; 89'

17 January 2025 Friendly	Xamax (Switzerland)	1-2	(Switzerland) Nyon
14:00 CET	Seghir 77'	Report	Seydou Traoré 13'; Juan Martin Ghia 32'

28 January 2025 Friendly	Xamax (Switzerland)	0-2	(Switzerland) Delémont
18:00 CET		Report	Süleyman Türkeş 6'; Altin Shala 11'

20 March 2025 Friendly	Luzern (Switzerland)	3-1	(Switzerland) Xamax	Lucerne
13:30 CET	Spadanuda 37'; Rúben Dantas Fernandes 66'; Grbić 89'	Report	Ramizi 67'	Stadium: Swissporarena

== Competitions ==
=== Overall record ===
Competition	First match	Last match	Starting round	Record							
Competition	First match	Last match	Starting round	Pld	W	D	L	GF	GA	GD	Win %
Swiss Challenge League	19 July 2024		Matchday 1	3	2	0	1	7	6	+1	66.67
Swiss Cup	16 August 2024		First round	0	0	0	0	0	0	+0	—
Total				3	2	0	1	7	6	+1	66.67

Last updated: 3 August 2024
Source: Soccerway

=== Swiss Challenge League ===
==== League table ====
Pos	Team	Pld	W	D	L	GF	GA	GD	Pts	Promotion, qualification or relegation
6	Vaduz	36	13	12	11	48	49	−1	51	Qualification for Conference League second qualifying round (Note: Vaduz qualified for the Conference League second qualifying round by winning the 2024–25 Liechtenstein Cup.)
7	Bellinzona (Note: Bellinzona were deducted 3 points on 16 December 2024 (confirmed on 22 January 2025), for failing to report social contribution payments. This decision was partially overturned by CAS on 25 April 2025 (Bellinzona are still fined SFr 30,000).)	36	11	11	14	47	60	−13	44	
8	Xamax	36	12	5	19	57	65	−8	41	
9	Nyon	36	10	6	20	44	69	−25	36	
10	Schaffhausen (R)	36	7	7	22	40	69	−29	25 (Note: Schaffhausen were deducted 3 points on 26 February 2025 (confirmed on 25 March 2025), for failing to report social contribution payments.)	Relegation to Swiss Promotion League

Source: Swiss Challenge League
Rules for classification: 1) Points; 2) Goal difference; 3) Goals scored; 4) Head-to-head goal difference; 5) Head-to-head goals scored 6) Away goals scored; 7) Draw.
(R) Relegated

==== Results summary ====
Overall								Home						Away					
Pld	W	D	L	GF	GA	GD	Pts	W	D	L	GF	GA	GD	W	D	L	GF	GA	GD
3	2	0	1	7	6	+1	6	1	0	0	3	2	+1	1	0	1	4	4	0

Last updated: 3 August 2024.

==== Results by round ====
Round	1	2
Ground	H	A
Result	W	
Position	3	

Updated to match(es) played on 3 August 2024. Source:
A = Away; H = Home; W = Win; D = Draw; L = Loss

==== Matches ====
The match schedule was released on 18 June 2024.

19 July 2024 1	Neuchâtel Xamax	3–2	Stade Lausanne Ouchy	Neuchâtel
19:30	Demhasaj 9', 86', (yellow card) 82'; Durugbor 15'		Fargues 25', (yellow card) 73'; Pos (red card) 42'; Qarri 90+2', (red card) 90+4'	Stadium: Stade de la Maladière; Attendance: 3,428; Referee: Lionel Tschudi

26 July 2024 2	Étoile Carouge	3–1	Neuchâtel Xamax	Carouge
20:15				Stadium: Stade de la Fontenette

3 August 2024 3	Aarau	1–3	Neuchâtel Xamax	Aarau
				Stadium: Stadion Brügglifeld

9 August 2024 4	Neuchâtel Xamax	2–2	Bellinzona	Neuchâtel
20:15 CEST	Koné 4'; Paschal Durugbor 13'; Fabio Saiz (yellow card) 86'; Brillani Soro (yellow card) 89'	Report	Nassim L'Ghoul 15'; Gilles Richard (yellow card) 19'; Johan Nkama (yellow card) 43'; Chacón (yellow card) 47'; Gorga (yellow card) 54' (goal) 76'; Néhemie Lusuena (yellow card) 85'	Stadium: Stade de la Maladière; Attendance: 3,534; Referee: (Switzerland) Tobias Thies

23 August 2024 5	Wil	4–0	Neuchâtel Xamax	Wil
20:15 CEST	Staubli 14'; Kastrijot Ndau (yellow card) 25' (goal) 69' (pen.); Ruben Fernandes (yellow card) 43'; Jacovic (yellow card) 48'; Rapp 54' 60' (yellow card) 64'; Cueni (yellow card) 84'; Jason Parente (yellow card) 90+4'	Report	Omeragić (yellow card) 69'; Ramizi (yellow card) 84'; Hajrović (yellow card) 87'	Stadium: Lidl Arena; Attendance: 1,494; Referee: (Switzerland) Hajrim Qovanaj

30 August 2024 6	Neuchâtel Xamax	4–1	Vaduz	Neuchâtel
19:30 CEST	Fabio Saiz 9' 87'; Francesco Lentini 50' (yellow card) 51'; Touati (yellow card) 52'; Demhasaj 77'	Report	Jonathan De Donno 11'; Wieser (yellow card) 45+3'; Mischa Eberhard (yellow card) 57'; Javi Navarro (yellow card) 66'	Stadium: Stade de la Maladière; Attendance: 3,187; Referee: (Switzerland) Hüseyin Sanli

20 September 2024 7	Schaffhausen	1–2	Neuchâtel Xamax	Schaffhausen
19:30 CEST	Gabriele De Donno 2'; Iwan Hegglin (yellow card) 37'; Gianni De Nitti (yellow card) 74'; Kozłowski (yellow card) 90+2'	Report	Touati 60' (yellow card) 65'; Jonathan Fontana (yellow card) 70'; Gonçalves (yellow card) 72'; Koné 74'; Yoan Epitaux (yellow card) 81'; Ben Seghir (yellow card) 90+2'; Fatkič (yellow card) 90+2'	Stadium: FCS Arena Schaffhausen; Attendance: 1,267; Referee: (Switzerland) David Schärli

23 September 2024 8	Neuchâtel Xamax	3–2	Nyon	Neuchâtel
19:30 CEST	Fabio Saiz (yellow card) 27' (yellow-red card) 90+4'; Touati 54' 70'; Demhasaj 75' (yellow card) 90+2'	Report	Leorat Bega 28'; Fábio Gomes (yellow card) 44'; Badara Diomandé 65'	Stadium: Stade de la Maladière; Attendance: 2,854; Referee: (Switzerland) Anojen Kanagasingam

27 September 2024 9	Thun	1–0	Neuchâtel Xamax	Thun
20:15 CEST	Dähler (yellow card) 8'; Bamert (yellow card) 39'; Matoshi 65'; Rastoder (yellow card) 73'; Bürki (yellow card) 82'	Report	Touati (yellow card) 34'; Demhasaj (yellow card) 39'; Bamba (yellow card) 53'; Jonathan Fontana (yellow card) 89'	Stadium: Stockhorn Arena; Attendance: 3,525; Referee: (Switzerland) Luca Piccolo

4 October 2024 10	Neuchâtel Xamax	2–1	Schaffhausen	Neuchâtel
19:30 CET	Francesco Lentini 6'; Demhasaj 14'; Jonathan Fontana (yellow card) 42'; Hajrulahu (yellow card) 85'	Report	Nadjack (yellow card) 19'; Giger (yellow card) 45+3'; Bunjaku (yellow card) 56'; Gabriele De Donno (yellow card) 64'; Pasadore 86'; Joel Berhane (yellow card) 89'; Iwan Hegglin (yellow card) 90+3'	Stadium: Stade de la Maladière; Attendance: 3,014; Referee: (Switzerland) Maxime Odiet

18 October 2024 11	Neuchâtel Xamax	0–3	Étoile Carouge	Neuchâtel
19:30 CET	Touati (yellow card) 59'; Yoan Epitaux (yellow card) 73'	Report	Zoukit (yellow card) 16'; Vincent Ferrier 21'; Aurélien Chappuis (yellow card) 50'; Bruno Caslei 60'; Hysenaj 85'	Stadium: Stade de la Maladière; Attendance: 3,922; Referee: (Switzerland) Marijan Drmic

26 October 2024 12	Bellinzona	0–2	Neuchâtel Xamax	Bellinzona
18:00 CET	Nuno da Silva (yellow card) 30'; Nivokazi (yellow card) 82'; Chacón (yellow card) 90+6'	Report	Paschal Durugbor 8'; Demhasaj 81'; Gonçalves (yellow card) 89'; Yoan Epitaux (yellow card) 90+4'	Stadium: Stadio Comunale Bellinzona; Attendance: 719; Referee: (Switzerland) Logan Berchier

1 November 2024 13	Neuchâtel Xamax	1–4	Wil	Neuchâtel
19:30 CET	Ramizi (yellow card) 34'; Fabio Saiz 47'; Gonçalves (yellow card) 57'; Jonathan Fontana (yellow card) 60'; Bamba (yellow card) 73'; Hajrović (yellow card) 84'	Report	Maier 26' 69'; Akinola 82'; Jason Parente 90+1' (yellow card) 90+2'	Stadium: Stade de la Maladière; Attendance: 3,238; Referee: (Switzerland) David Schärli

=== Swiss Cup ===
17 August 2024 First round	FC Biel-Bienne	2–1	Neuchâtel Xamax	Biel/Bienne
19:30	Malko Sartoretti 30' 47'; Yann Massombo (yellow card) 34'; Mveng (yellow card) 60'	Report	Campos (yellow card) 43'; Ramizi 66'; Bamba (yellow card) 74'; Jonathan Fontana (yellow card) 90+1' (yellow-red card) 90+4'; Demhasaj (yellow card) 90+5'	Stadium: Tissot Arena; Attendance: 1,748; Referee: (Switzerland) Nico Gianforte
