= List of Swiss football transfers summer 2025 =

This is a list of Swiss football transfers for the 2025 summer transfer window. Only transfers featuring Swiss Super League are listed.

== Swiss Super League ==
Note: Flags indicate national team as has been defined under FIFA eligibility rules. Players may hold more than one non-FIFA nationality.

=== Basel ===
In:

No.	Pos.	Nation	Player
5	MF	BRA	Metinho (from (France) Troyes, previously on loan)
6	DF	JPN	Keigo Tsunemoto (from Servette)
7	FW	NGA	Philip Otele (from (United Arab Emirates) Al Wahda, previously on loan)
8	MF	FRA	Koba Koindredi (on loan from (Portugal) Sporting CP, previously on loan at Lausanne-Sport)
14	MF	SRB	Andrej Bačanin (from (Serbia) Čukarički)
17	FW	GER	Moritz Broschinski (from (Germany) VfL Bochum)

Out:

No.	Pos.	Nation	Player
8	MF	POR	Romário Baró (loan return to (Portugal) Porto)
9	FW	ESP	Kevin Carlos (to (France) Nice)
14	FW	SUI	Bradley Fink (to (England) Wycombe Wanderers)
17	DF	SWE	Joe Mendes (loan return to (Portugal) Braga)
21	MF	GEO	Gabriel Sigua (on loan to Lausanne-Sport)
34	MF	ALB	Taulant Xhaka (retired)
37	MF	SUI	Leon Avdullahu (to (Germany) TSG Hoffenheim)
—	MF	GHA	Emmanuel Essiam (on loan to (Belgium) Francs Borains, previously on loan at Aarau)
—	FW	SUI	Andrin Hunziker (on loan to Winterthur, previously on loan at (Germany) Karlsruher SC)
—	FW	SRB	Đorđe Jovanović (on loan to (Israel) Maccabi Haifa, previously on loan at (Serbia) Partizan)
—	DF	ESP	Arnau Comas (to (Spain) Deportivo La Coruña, previously on loan at (Spain) Eibar)
—	FW	GER	Maurice Malone (to Austria Wien, previously on loan)
—	FW	BEL	Jonathan Dubasin (to (Spain) Sporting Gijón, previously on loan)
—	FW	SUI	Roméo Beney (to (Portugal) Famalicão, previously on loan at Stade Lausanne Ouchy)
—	FW	COD	Axel Kayombo (to (Austria) Sturm Graz, previously on loan at Stade Lausanne Ouchy)

=== Servette ===
In:

No.	Pos.	Nation	Player
7	MF	SUI	Giotto Morandi (from Grasshoppers)
11	MF	FRA	Lamine Fomba (from (France) Saint-Étienne)
14	DF	FRA	Lilian Njoh (from (Italy) Salernitana)
25	DF	TUN	Dylan Bronn (from (Italy) Salernitana)
30	MF	GAM	Ablie Jallow (from (France) Metz)
90	FW	SVK	Samuel Mráz (from (Poland) Motor Lublin)
97	FW	FRA	Florian Ayé (from (France) Auxerre)

Out:

No.	Pos.	Nation	Player
3	DF	JPN	Keigo Tsunemoto (to Basel)
7	FW	NGA	Victory Beniangba (loan return to (Belgium) Genk)
11	FW	SUI	Julian von Moos (on loan to Luzern)
17	MF	SUI	Dereck Kutesa (to (Greece) AEK Athens)
24	FW	SEN	Alioune Ndoye (loan return to (Latvia) Valmiera)
25	DF	GHA	Kasim Adams (free agent)
27	FW	FRA	Enzo Crivelli (to (Iran) Sepahan)
29	MF	BEL	Joseph Nonge (loan return to (Italy) Juventus)
44	GK	KOS	Léo Besson (on loan to Stade Lausanne Ouchy)
—	MF	SUI	Patrick Weber (on loan to Yverdon-Sport, previously on loan at Nyon)
—	MF	CIV	Sidiki Camara (on loan to Yverdon-Sport, previously on loan at Étoile Carouge)
—	DF	KOS	Valton Behrami (to Bulle)
—	DF	FRA	Moussa Diallo (to (France) Nîmes)
—	DF	SUI	Noah Henchoz (to USI Azzurri, previously on loan at Étoile Carouge)
—	FW	SUI	Alexandre Patrício (free agent)
—	DF	SUI	Malik Sawadogo (to (Liechtenstein) Vaduz, previously on loan at Nyon)
—	FW	DEN	Alexander Lyng (to (Denmark) Sønderjyske, previously on loan)
—	FW	CTA	Usman Simbakoli (to (Belgium) RWDM Brussels, previously on loan at Étoile Carouge)

=== Young Boys ===
In:

No.	Pos.	Nation	Player
5	DF	SUI	Gregory Wüthrich (from (Austria) Sturm Graz)
6	MF	SUI	Edimilson Fernandes (from (Germany) Mainz 05, previously on loan at (France) Brest)
9	FW	VEN	Sergio Córdova (from (Turkey) Alanyaspor)
12	GK	AUT	Heinz Lindner (from Sion)
13	MF	CZE	Dominik Pech (on loan from (Czech Republic) Slavia Prague)
21	FW	FRA	Alan Virginius (from (France) Lille, previously on loan)
37	MF	BIH	Armin Gigović (from (Germany) Holstein Kiel)

Out:

No.	Pos.	Nation	Player
7	MF	SUI	Filip Ugrinić (to (Spain) Valencia)
9	FW	SUI	Cedric Itten (to (Germany) Fortuna Düsseldorf)
10	MF	SUI	Kastriot Imeri (on loan to Thun)
13	DF	GUI	Mohamed Ali Camara (to (Israel) Maccabi Tel Aviv)
14	MF	ZIM	Miguel Chaiwa (to (Scotland) Hibernian)
18	GK	SUI	Ardian Bajrami (on loan to (Norway) Skeid)
22	DF	POR	Abdu Conté (loan return to (France) Troyes)
24	DF	SUI	Zachary Athekame (to (Italy) AC Milan)
—	FW	SUI	Malik Deme (on loan to Neuchâtel Xamax, previously on loan at (Liechtenstein) Vaduz)
—	DF	SUI	Sadin Crnovršanin (to (Germany) SSV Ulm, previously on loan at Wil)
—	DF	SUI	Anel Husić (to (Croatia) Rijeka, previously on loan at (Turkey) Gaziantep)
—	MF	SEN	Cheikh Niasse (to (Italy) Hellas Verona, previously on loan)
—	MF	SUI	Théo Golliard (to Winterthur, previously on loan at (Netherlands) Helmond Sport)

=== Lugano ===
In:

No.	Pos.	Nation	Player
4	DF	SUI	Damian Kelvin (from Biel-Bienne)
7	DF	MKD	Ezgjan Alioski (from (Saudi Arabia) Al-Ahli)
14	MF	ALG	Ahmed Kendouci (from (Egypt) Ceramica Cleopatra)
24	MF	SWE	Elias Pihlström (from (Sweden) Degerfors)
91	FW	GER	Kevin Behrens (from (Germany) VfL Wolfsburg)
97	FW	FRA	Alexandre Parsemain (from (France) Dijon)

Out:

No.	Pos.	Nation	Player
7	MF	CZE	Roman Macek (to (Czech Republic) Mladá Boleslav)
9	FW	KOS	Shkelqim Vladi (on loan to St. Gallen)
23	DF	ARG	Milton Valenzuela (to (Argentina) Independiente)
28	MF	SUI	Yannis Ryter (on loan to Rapperswil-Jona)
31	FW	ARG	Ignacio Aliseda (to (Paraguay) Cerro Porteño)
34	FW	SUI	Boris Babić (free agent)
58	GK	NGA	Sebastian Osigwe (to Bellinzona)
93	FW	POL	Kacper Przybyłko (to (Poland) Odra Opole)
98	DF	SUI	Allan Arigoni (to Grasshoppers)
—	MF	NGA	Johan Nkama (to Stade Lausanne Ouchy, previously on loan at Bellinzona)

=== Lausanne-Sport ===
In:

No.	Pos.	Nation	Player
2	DF	FRA	Brandon Soppy (from (Italy) Atalanta U23)
5	DF	SUI	Bryan Okoh (from (Austria) Red Bull Salzburg, previously on loan at (Austria) Liefering)
11	FW	ENG	Nathan Butler-Oyedeji (from (England) Arsenal)
22	FW	FRA	Enzo Kana-Biyik (on loan from (England) Manchester United)
38	MF	GEO	Gabriel Sigua (on loan from Basel)
42	MF	SUI	Nicky Beloko (from (United States) Austin FC)
70	FW	MLI	Gaoussou Diakité (on loan from (Austria) Red Bull Salzburg, previously on loan at (Austria) Liefering)
77	FW	KSA	Muhannad Al-Saad (on loan from (Saudi Arabia) Neom, previously on loan at (France) Dunkerque)

Out:

No.	Pos.	Nation	Player
5	MF	FRA	Koba Koindredi (loan return to (Portugal) Sporting CP)
6	DF	BEL	Noë Dussenne (to (Belgium) OH Leuven)
19	DF	FRA	Marvin Senaya (loan return to (France) Strasbourg)
34	DF	SUI	Raoul Giger (to (Poland) Wisła Kraków)
44	DF	SUI	Dircssi Ngonzo (on loan to Nyon)
70	FW	GUI	Aliou Baldé (loan return to (France) Nice)
92	FW	FRA	Teddy Okou (loan return to Luzern)
—	MF	FRA	Antoine Bernède (to (Italy) Hellas Verona, previously on loan)
—	FW	SUI	Malko Sartoretti (to Stade Lausanne Ouchy, previously on loan at Biel-Bienne)

=== Luzern ===
In:

No.	Pos.	Nation	Player
4	DF	ALB	Adrian Bajrami (on loan from (Portugal) Benfica)
6	MF	JPN	Taisei Abe (on loan from (Japan) V-Varen Nagasaki)
11	MF	SUI	Matteo Di Giusto (from Winterthur)
34	MF	SUI	Demir Xhemalija (from Basel U21)
81	FW	SUI	Julian von Moos (on loan from Servette)

Out:

No.	Pos.	Nation	Player
8	MF	SRB	Aleksandar Stanković (loan return to (Italy) Inter Milan)
11	MF	KOS	Donat Rrudhani (loan return to Young Boys)
15	FW	SUI	Nando Toggenburger (on loan to Kriens)
16	MF	SVK	Jakub Kadák (to (Czech Republic) Dukla Prague)
17	FW	TOG	Thibault Klidjé (to (Scotland) Hibernian)
18	MF	SUI	Nicky Beloko (to (United States) Austin)
34	FW	SUI	Luuk Breedijk (on loan to Wil)
68	MF	SUI	Mattia Walker (on loan to Étoile Carouge)
69	FW	FRA	Sofyan Chader (free agent)
—	FW	FRA	Teddy Okou (to (Saudi Arabia) Al-Riyadh, previously on loan at Lausanne-Sport)

=== Zürich ===
In:

No.	Pos.	Nation	Player
3	DF	CUW	Livano Comenencia (from (Italy) Juventus Next Gen)
4	DF	COL	Jorge Segura (from (Bulgaria) Lokomotiv Plovdiv)
9	FW	COL	Juan José Perea (from (Germany) VfB Stuttgart, previously on loan)
15	MF	COL	Nelson Palacio (on loan from (United States) Real Salt Lake)
17	FW	GLP	Matthias Phaëton (on loan from (Bulgaria) CSKA Sofia)
19	FW	SEN	Philippe Kény (from (Turkey) İstanbul Başakşehir)
21	FW	FRA	Lisandru Tramoni (from (Italy) Pisa, previously on loan at (France) Bastia)
23	DF	SRB	Milan Rodić (from (Serbia) Red Star Belgrade)
27	DF	SUI	Ilan Sauter (from Bellinzona)

Out:

No.	Pos.	Nation	Player
1	GK	BIH	Živko Kostadinović (free agent)
3	DF	FRA	Benjamin Mendy (free agent)
4	MF	CIV	Jean-Philippe Gbamin (to (France) Metz)
8	MF	SUI	Samuel Ballet (loan return to (Italy) Como)
12	MF	NGA	Ifeanyi Mathew (free agent)
16	DF	ISR	Doron Leidner (loan return to (Greece) Olympiacos)
18	FW	GHA	Daniel Afriyie (to Aarau)
19	FW	CIV	Fernand Gouré (loan return to (Belgium) Westerlo)
23	MF	FRA	Mounir Chouiar (loan return to (Bulgaria) Ludogorets Razgrad)
27	DF	POR	Rodrigo Conceição (free agent)
31	DF	KOS	Mirlind Kryeziu (free agent)
33	MF	ZAM	Joseph Sabobo (to (Israel) Hapoel Be'er Sheva)
36	DF	SUI	Daniel Denoon (on loan to (Italy) Pisa)
—	DF	SUI	Ramon Guzzo (to Aarau, previously on loan at Wil)
—	DF	BIH	Nikola Katić (to (Germany) Schalke 04, previously on loan at (England) Plymouth Argyle)
—	FW	SUI	Labinot Bajrami (to (Netherlands) Helmond Sport, previously on loan at Winterthur)

=== St. Gallen ===
In:

No.	Pos.	Nation	Player
10	MF	GER	Lukas Daschner (from (Germany) VfL Bochum, previously on loan)
11	MF	GER	Carlo Boukhalfa (from (Germany) FC St. Pauli)
14	FW	GUI	Aliou Baldé (on loan from (France) Nice, previously on loan at Lausanne-Sport)
19	FW	KOS	Shkelqim Vladi (on loan from Lugano)
26	DF	GER	Tom Gaal (from (Germany) SSV Ulm)
47	FW	ITA	Enoch Owusu (from (Italy) Inter Milan, previously on loan)

Out:

No.	Pos.	Nation	Player
2	DF	CMR	Noah Yannick (to (Kosovo) Feronikeli 74)
3	DF	GHA	Musah Nuhu (free agent)
9	FW	FRA	Willem Geubbels (to (France) Paris FC)
10	FW	COD	Chadrac Akolo (free agent)
11	FW	GUI	Moustapha Cissé (loan return to (Italy) Atalanta)
13	MF	SUI	Gregory Karlen (free agent)
15	DF	MLI	Abdoulaye Diaby (free agent)
18	FW	SUI	Felix Mambimbi (to (France) Le Havre)
22	DF	GER	Konrad Faber (on loan to (Germany) Dynamo Dresden)
33	FW	CMR	Jean-Pierre Nsame (loan return to (Poland) Legia Warsaw)
35	GK	GER	Bela Dumrath (on loan to (Germany) Stuttgarter Kickers)
—	FW	SWE	Nikolaj Möller (to (Scotland) Dundee United, previously on loan at (Norway) Strømsgodset)

=== Sion ===
In:

No.	Pos.	Nation	Player
1	GK	SUI	Anthony Racioppi (from (England) Hull City, previously on loan at (Germany) 1. FC Köln)
9	FW	POR	Dinis Rodrigues (from (Portugal) Braga B)
12	GK	ITA	Francesco Ruberto (from (Portugal) Vizela)
13	FW	SUI	Winsley Boteli (on loan from (Germany) Borussia Mönchengladbach II)
23	FW	KOS	Altin Shala (from SR Delémont)
25	MF	SEN	Lamine Diack (on loan from (France) Nantes, previously on loan at (Turkey) Hatayspor)
28	DF	KOS	Kreshnik Hajrizi (from (Poland) Widzew Łódź, previously on loan)
33	FW	KOS	Rilind Nivokazi (from Bellinzona)
39	FW	SUI	Josias Lukembila (from (France) Paris FC, previously on loan at Winterthur)

Out:

No.	Pos.	Nation	Player
1	GK	AUT	Heinz Lindner (to Young Boys)
4	DF	SEN	Gora Diouf (to (Belgium) Mechelen)
9	FW	SUI	Dejan Sorgić (to Yverdon-Sport)
10	MF	RUS	Anton Miranchuk (to (Russia) Dynamo Moscow)
19	FW	SUI	Dejan Djokic (on loan to (Hungary) Debrecen)
22	MF	SUI	Pajtim Kasami (free agent)
32	MF	SUI	Pierrick Moulin (on loan to Bellinzona)
55	DF	SUI	Noah Grognuz (on loan to Nyon)
73	DF	SUI	Yohan Aymon (to Vevey-Sports)
80	MF	SUI	Dylan Tutonda (to Bellinzona)
93	DF	ITA	Federico Barba (to (Indonesia) Persib Bandung)
90	FW	SUI	Rayan Stoll (on loan to Nyon)
99	FW	MAR	Mouhcine Bouriga (to (Morocco) FAR Rabat)
—	FW	BUL	Georgi Rusev (on loan to (Bulgaria) CSKA 1948, previously on loan at (Bulgaria) Ludogorets Razgrad)
—	MF	URU	Cristian Souza (to (Peru) Cienciano, previously on loan at Bellinzona)

=== Winterthur ===
In:

No.	Pos.	Nation	Player
8	MF	SUI	Théo Golliard (from Young Boys, previously on loan at (Netherlands) Helmond Sport)
17	FW	SUI	Andrin Hunziker (on loan from Basel, previously on loan at (Germany) Karlsruher SC)
66	DF	LUX	Marvin Martins (from (Netherlands) Almere City)
68	FW	FRA	Brian Beyer (from Biel-Bienne)

Out:

No.	Pos.	Nation	Player
3	DF	SUI	Tobias Schättin (to (Cyprus) Anorthosis Famagusta)
10	MF	SUI	Matteo Di Giusto (to Luzern)
11	MF	SUI	Fabian Frei (retired)
17	FW	SUI	Albin Krasniqi (on loan to (Austria) Wacker Innsbruck)
23	DF	KOS	Granit Lekaj (to Young Fellows Juventus)
29	MF	FRA	Boubacar Fofana (to (France) Sochaux)
30	GK	AUT	Markus Kuster (to (Cyprus) Enosis Neon Paralimni)
84	FW	SUI	Labinot Bajrami (loan return to Zürich)
90	FW	SUI	Josias Lukembila (loan return to (France) Paris FC)
—	MF	SUI	Noe Holenstein (to Schaffhausen, previously on loan)
—	FW	SUI	Laurin Vögele (to Cham, previously on loan)
—	FW	FRA	Antoine Baroan (to (Romania) Rapid București, previously on loan at (Bulgaria) Ludogorets Razgrad)

=== Grasshoppers ===
In:

No.	Pos.	Nation	Player
5	MF	BEN	Hassane Imourane (from (Benin) Loto-Popo, previously on loan)
7	FW	ENG	Luke Plange (from (England) Crystal Palace, previously on loan at (Scotland) Motherwell)
10	MF	DEN	Jonathan Asp Jensen (on loan from (Germany) Bayern Munich II)
11	MF	CIV	Salifou Diarrassouba (from (Ivory Coast) ASEC Mimosas)
14	MF	CRO	Lovro Zvonarek (on loan from (Germany) Bayern Munich, previously on loan at (Austria) Sturm Graz)
16	MF	ITA	Matteo Mantini (from (Italy) Inter Milan youth)
22	DF	ITA	Pantaleo Creti (from (Italy) Monza youth)
27	FW	ARG	Tomás Verón Lupi (from (Uruguay) Racing de Montevideo, previously on loan)
34	DF	SUI	Allan Arigoni (from Lugano)
73	DF	ITA	Dorian Paloschi (from (Italy) Milan Primavera)
—	MF	ESP	Óscar Clemente (from (Spain) Levante, previously on loan at (Spain) Cartagena)
—	FW	GAM	Aliou Conateh (from (The Gambia) Gambinos Stars)

Out:

No.	Pos.	Nation	Player
7	MF	GER	Tsiy-William Ndenge (to (Singapore) Lion City Sailors)
10	MF	SUI	Giotto Morandi (to Servette)
11	MF	SUI	Pascal Schürpf (retired)
15	DF	JPN	Ayumu Seko (to (France) Le Havre)
16	DF	SWE	Noah Persson (loan return to Young Boys)
19	MF	CAN	Mathieu Choinière (on loan to (United States) Los Angeles FC)
22	DF	GER	Benno Schmitz (to (Germany) Bayern Munich II)
24	DF	PHI	Michael Kempter (to (Thailand) Muangthong United)
25	FW	GAM	Adama Bojang (loan return to (France) Reims)
26	DF	EST	Maksim Paskotši (to (Belgium) Gent)
27	FW	FRA	Bryan Lasme (loan return to (Germany) Schalke 04)
29	GK	AUT	Manuel Kuttin (to Austria Klagenfurt)
66	FW	NZL	Nestory Irankunda (loan return to (Germany) Bayern Munich II)
77	MF	SUI	Filipe de Carvalho (to Rapperswil-Jona)
—	FW	GAM	Aliou Conateh (on loan to SKU Amstetten)
—	DF	KOS	Florian Hoxha (on loan to (Liechtenstein) Vaduz, previously on loan at Schaffhausen)

=== Thun ===
In:

No.	Pos.	Nation	Player
7	MF	SUI	Kastriot Imeri (on loan from Young Boys)
11	FW	ENG	Layton Stewart (from (England) Preston North End, previously on loan)
14	MF	EST	Mattias Käit (from (Romania) Rapid București)
27	DF	SUI	Michael Heule (from Stade Lausanne Ouchy)
96	FW	MTQ	Brighton Labeau (from (France) Guingamp)

Out:

No.	Pos.	Nation	Player
7	MF	SUI	Miguel Castroman (to Schaffhausen)
9	FW	FRA	Hermann Tebily (to (France) Rodez)
10	MF	URU	Mathías Tomás (on loan to (Cyprus) APOEL)
29	MF	ENG	Declan Frith (to (England) Peterborough United)
46	MF	SUI	Hélios Sessolo (to Yverdon-Sport)
64	GK	SUI	Dario Wälti (on loan to Kriens)
—	FW	SUI	Uros Vasic (to Biel-Bienne, previously on loan at Naters)

== See also ==
- 2025–26 Swiss Super League
