= List of Swiss football transfers winter 2024–25 =

This is a list of Swiss football transfers for the 2024–25 winter transfer window. Only transfers featuring Swiss Super League are listed.

== Swiss Super League ==
Note: Flags indicate national team as has been defined under FIFA eligibility rules. Players may hold more than one non-FIFA nationality.

=== Young Boys ===
In:

No.	Pos.	Nation	Player
16	MF	SUI	Christian Fassnacht (from (England) Norwich City)
29	FW	CIV	Chris Bedia (on loan from (Germany) Union Berlin, previously on loan at (England) Hull City)
45	MF	MAD	Rayan Raveloson (from (France) Auxerre)

Out:

No.	Pos.	Nation	Player
5	DF	SUI	Anel Husić (on loan to (Turkey) Gaziantep)
6	DF	GHA	Patric Pfeiffer (loan return to (Germany) FC Augsburg)
15	FW	COD	Meschak Elia (on loan to (France) Nantes)
20	MF	SEN	Cheikh Niasse (on loan to (Italy) Hellas Verona)
35	FW	CGO	Silvère Ganvoula (to (Italy) Monza)
50	DF	SUI	Sadin Crnovršanin (on loan to Wil)
—	FW	SUI	Malik Deme (on loan to (Liechtenstein) Vaduz, previously on loan at Nyon)

=== Lugano ===
In:

No.	Pos.	Nation	Player
70	FW	GRE	Georgios Koutsias (on loan from (United States) Chicago Fire)

Out:

No.	Pos.	Nation	Player

=== Servette ===
In:

No.	Pos.	Nation	Player
24	FW	SEN	Alioune Ndoye (on loan from (Latvia) Valmiera)
29	MF	BEL	Joseph Nonge (on loan from (Italy) Juventus, previously on loan at (France) Troyes)
—	FW	SUI	Benjamin Keita (from Meyrin)

Out:

No.	Pos.	Nation	Player
22	FW	CTA	Usman Simbakoli (on loan to Étoile Carouge)
23	DF	FRA	Sofyane Bouzamoucha (to (France) Rouen)
24	DF	SUI	Malik Sawadogo (on loan to Nyon)
26	MF	SUI	Patrick Weber (on loan to Nyon)
—	FW	SUI	Benjamin Keita (on loan to Nyon)

=== Zürich ===
In:

No.	Pos.	Nation	Player
3	DF	FRA	Benjamin Mendy (from (France) Lorient)
4	MF	CIV	Jean-Philippe Gbamin (from (France) Nantes)
17	FW	SUI	Steven Zuber (from (Greece) AEK Athens)

Out:

No.	Pos.	Nation	Player
3	DF	SRB	Nemanja Tošić (on loan to (Spain) Deportivo La Coruña)
10	MF	SUI	Antonio Marchesano (to Yverdon)
11	FW	COD	Jonathan Okita (to (Turkey) Bodrum)
17	MF	GUI	Cheick Condé (to (Italy) Venezia)
24	DF	BIH	Nikola Katić (on loan to (England) Plymouth Argyle)

=== St. Gallen ===
In:

No.	Pos.	Nation	Player
19	MF	GER	Lukas Daschner (on loan from (Germany) VfL Bochum)
33	FW	CMR	Jean-Pierre Nsame (on loan from (Italy) Como, previously on loan at (Poland) Legia Warsaw)

Out:

No.	Pos.	Nation	Player
30	FW	ESP	Víctor Ruiz (free agent)
56	MF	SUI	Edis Bytyqi (on loan to Wil)
60	GK	SUI	Gentrit Muslija (on loan to Wil)
90	FW	SRB	Jovan Milošević (loan return to (Germany) VfB Stuttgart)

=== Winterthur ===
In:

No.	Pos.	Nation	Player
19	DF	SUI	Dario Ulrich (from Luzern)
44	MF	SUI	Stéphane Cueni (from Wil)

Out:

No.	Pos.	Nation	Player
8	MF	SUI	Musa Araz (to Neuchâtel Xamax)
19	FW	SUI	Elias Maluvunu (on loan to Schaffhausen)
20	MF	SUI	Carmine Chiappetta (on loan to Schaffhausen)
28	FW	FRA	Antoine Baroan (on loan to (Bulgaria) Ludogorets Razgrad)

=== Luzern ===
In:

No.	Pos.	Nation	Player

Out:

No.	Pos.	Nation	Player
4	DF	SUI	Luca Jaquez (to (Germany) VfB Stuttgart)
22	DF	SUI	Dario Ulrich (to Winterthur)

=== Basel ===
In:

No.	Pos.	Nation	Player
5	MF	BRA	Metinho (on loan from (France) Troyes, previously on loan at (Netherlands) Sparta Rotterdam)
7	FW	NGA	Philip Otele (on loan from (United Arab Emirates) Al Wahda)
28	DF	GHA	Daniel Asiedu (from (Ghana) Berekum Chelsea)
—	FW	BRA	Kaio Eduardo (from (Brazil) Capivariano)

Out:

No.	Pos.	Nation	Player
4	DF	ESP	Arnau Comas (on loan to (Spain) Eibar)
6	DF	TUN	Mohamed Dräger (to (Germany) Eintracht Braunschweig)
7	MF	KOS	Benjamin Kololli (to Sion)
18	MF	GHA	Emmanuel Essiam (on loan to Aarau)
35	FW	SUI	Roméo Beney (on loan to Stade Lausanne)
36	DF	SUI	Marvin Akahomen (on loan to Wil)
—	FW	BRA	Kaio Eduardo (on loan to (Liechtenstein) Vaduz)
—	MF	GER	Adriano Onyegbule (on loan to (Liechtenstein) Vaduz, previously on loan at Schaffhausen)

=== Yverdon ===
In:

No.	Pos.	Nation	Player
12	DF	ITA	Cristiano Piccini (from (Mexico) Atlético San Luis)
15	MF	PAR	Cristian Núñez (from (Argentina) Banfield)
18	DF	NOR	Vegard Kongsro (from (Norway) HamKam)
19	MF	SUI	Antonio Marchesano (from Zürich)
20	FW	POR	Ronaldo Tavares (on loan from (Portugal) Estrela Amadora, previously on loan at (South Korea) Seoul)

Out:

No.	Pos.	Nation	Player
12	DF	ALG	Haithem Loucif (to (Algeria) USM Alger)
14	FW	RWA	Johan Kury (to Delémont)
15	MF	URU	Franco González (loan return to (Uruguay) Peñarol)
17	MF	SUI	Ricardo Alves (on loan to Étoile Carouge)
20	FW	SUI	Jessé Hautier (on loan to Neuchâtel Xamax)
23	DF	NOR	Niklas Gunnarsson (on loan to Neuchâtel Xamax)
26	MF	BRA	Silva (on loan to Nyon)
33	DF	KOS	Rejan Thaçi (free agent)
41	MF	CIV	Samba Koné (on loan to (Malta) Sliema Wanderers)
45	DF	JAM	Dexter Lembikisa (loan return to (England) Wolverhampton Wanderers)

=== Lausanne ===
In:

No.	Pos.	Nation	Player
19	DF	FRA	Marvin Senaya (on loan from (France) Strasbourg)
27	MF	MTN	Beyatt Lekweiry (from (Croatia) Istra 1961)
70	FW	GUI	Aliou Baldé (on loan from (France) Nice, previously on loan at (Germany) VfL Bochum)

Out:

No.	Pos.	Nation	Player
17	FW	CIV	Seydou Traoré (on loan to Nyon)
20	DF	FRA	Hamza Abdallah (on loan to Stade Lausanne)
21	MF	POR	Diogo Carraco (on loan to Stade Lausanne)
24	MF	FRA	Antoine Bernède (on loan to (Italy) Hellas Verona)
30	MF	ITA	Simone Pafundi (loan return to (Italy) Udinese)
99	MF	ENG	Trae Coyle (to (Republic of Ireland) Waterford)

=== Grasshoppers ===
In:

No.	Pos.	Nation	Player
4	DF	USA	Grayson Dettoni (on loan from (Germany) Bayern Munich II)
14	MF	BEN	Imourane Hassane (on loan from (Benin) Loto-Popo)
27	FW	FRA	Bryan Lasme (on loan from (Germany) Schalke 04)
66	FW	AUS	Nestory Irankunda (on loan from (Germany) Bayern Munich II)

Out:

No.	Pos.	Nation	Player
4	DF	LVA	Kristers Tobers (to (Scotland) Aberdeen)
5	DF	AUS	Joshua Laws (free agent)
14	DF	FRA	Théo Ndicka (to (Ukraine) Oleksandriya)
21	FW	AUS	Awer Mabil (free agent)
27	FW	POR	Asumah Abubakar (to (Australia) Brisbane Roar)
73	DF	KOS	Florian Hoxha (on loan to Schaffhausen)
99	FW	MKD	Dorian Babunski (to (Romania) Sepsi OSK)

=== Sion ===
In:

No.	Pos.	Nation	Player
22	MF	SUI	Pajtim Kasami (from (Italy) Sampdoria)
23	MF	KOS	Benjamin Kololli (from Basel)
27	DF	ITA	Gabriele Mulazzi (from (Italy) Juventus Next Gen)
28	DF	KOS	Kreshnik Hajrizi (on loan from (Poland) Widzew Łódź)
93	DF	ITA	Federico Barba (from (Italy) Como)
—	GK	ITA	Matteo Fuscaldo (on loan from (Italy) Juventus Next Gen, previously on loan at (Italy) Empoli U20)

Out:

No.	Pos.	Nation	Player
2	DF	SUI	Joël Schmied (to (Germany) 1. FC Köln)
52	MF	URU	Cristian Souza (on loan to Bellinzona)
—	DF	SUI	Gilles Richard (on loan to Nyon, previously on loan at Bellinzona)

== See also ==
- 2024–25 Swiss Super League
