= 2022–23 FC Wil season =

FC Wil
2022–23 season
- Chairman: Maurice Weber
- Manager: Brunello Iacopetta
- Stadium: Sportpark Bergholz
- Swiss Challenge League: 5th
- Swiss Cup: Round 3
- Top goalscorer: League: Nikolas Muci (11); All: Nikolas Muci (12)

The 2022–23 season was the 123rd season in the history of FC Wil and their 19th consecutive season in the second division. The club participated in Swiss Challenge League and the Swiss Cup. The season covered the period from 1 July 2022 to 30 June 2023.

== Players ==
As of 22 September 2022

Note: Flags indicate national team as defined under FIFA eligibility rules; some limited exceptions apply. Players may hold more than one non-FIFA nationality.

No.	Pos.	Nation	Player
1	GK	SUI	Noam Baumann
4	DF	SUI	Silvan Wallner (on loan from Zürich)
5	DF	ESP	Genís Montolio
6	DF	SUI	Simon Geiger
7	MF	GER	Sebastian Malinowski
8	MF	KOS	Mergim Brahimi
9	FW	SUI	Josias Lukembila
10	FW	FRA	Sofian Bahloul
11	FW	BRA	Sílvio
14	DF	GER	Philipp Altmann
17	MF	SUI	Tim Staubli
18	MF	SUI	Stéphane Cueni (on loan from Lausanne-Sport)

No.	Pos.	Nation	Player
19	FW	SUI	Nikolas Muci (on loan from Lugano)
20	MF	ALB	Kastrijot Ndau
21	MF	ESP	Umar Saho
22	FW	SUI	Nico Maier (on loan from Young Boys)
23	GK	SUI	Nicholas Ammeter
27	MF	SUI	Philipp Muntwiler
28	GK	SUI	Nico Strübi
29	DF	SUI	Marcin Dickenmann
33	FW	MKD	Luan Abazi
34	DF	SUI	Rafet Baralija
41	MF	SUI	Lavdim Zumberi
70	MF	SUI	Nils Reichmuth (on loan from Zürich)
77	DF	SUI	Michael Heule

== Pre-season and friendlies ==
Win Draw Loss

18 June 2022 Friendly	Zürich (Switzerland)	3–2	(Switzerland) Wil	Uitikon
18:00 CEST (UTC+2)	Vyunnyk 50', 55'; Marchesano 82' (pen.)		Lukembila 10'; Staubli 59'	Stadium: Sürenloh; Attendance: 864

25 June 2022 Friendly	Austria Lustenau	0–4	(Switzerland) Wil	Bürs
10:30 CEST (UTC+2)				Stadium: Sportplatz Uf dr Schesa

== Competitions ==
=== Overall record ===
Competition	First match	Last match	Starting round	Final position	Record							
Competition	First match	Last match	Starting round	Final position	Pld	W	D	L	GF	GA	GD	Win %
Swiss Challenge League	15 July 2022	27 May 2023	Matchday 1	5th	36	16	8	12	62	52	+10	44.44
Swiss Cup	20 August 2022	9 November 2022	Round 1	Round 3	3	2	0	1	9	2	+7	66.67
Total					39	18	8	13	71	54	+17	46.15

Source: Soccerway

=== Swiss Challenge League ===
==== League table ====
Pos	Team	Pld	W	D	L	GF	GA	GD	Pts	Promotion or qualification
3	Lausanne-Ouchy (Note: Lausanne-Ouchy were deducted 3 points on 1 November 2022, due to license violations. This decision was overturned following the team's appeal on 22 November 2022.) (O, P)	36	17	9	10	70	53	+17	60	Qualification for the promotion play-off
4	Aarau	36	15	12	9	63	57	+6	57	
5	Wil	36	16	8	12	62	52	+10	56	
6	Thun	36	12	13	11	62	55	+7	49	
7	Schaffhausen	36	12	8	16	51	59	−8	44	

Source: Swiss Challenge League
Rules for classification: 1) Points; 2) Goal difference; 3) Goals scored; 4) Head-to-head goal difference; 5) Away goals scored; 6) Draw.
(O) Play-off winners; (P) Promoted

==== Results summary ====
Overall								Home						Away					
Pld	W	D	L	GF	GA	GD	Pts	W	D	L	GF	GA	GD	W	D	L	GF	GA	GD
36	16	8	12	62	52	+10	56	11	2	5	39	20	+19	5	6	7	23	32	−9

Source: Swiss Challenge League

==== Results by round ====
Round	1	2	3	4	5	6	7	8	9	10	11	12	13	14	15	16	17	18	19	20	21	22	23	24	25	26	27	28	29	30	31	32	33	34	35	36
Ground	H	A	H	A	A	H	A	H	A	H	A	H	A	H	A	H	A	H	A	H	A	H	H	A	A	H	A	H	A	H	H	A	A	H	A	H
Result	W	L	W	W	W	D	L	W	L	W	L	W	D	W	W	W	D	D	D	W	W	W	L	D	D	L	L	L	W	W	L	D	L	W	L	L
Position																																				

Source: Swiss Challenge League
A = Away; H = Home; W = Win; D = Draw; L = Loss

==== Matches ====
The league fixtures were announced on 17 June 2022.

17 July 2022 1	Wil	2–0	Neuchâtel Xamax	Wil
14:15		Report		Stadium: Lidl Arena

23 July 2023 2	Stade-Lausanne-Ouchy	2–1	Wil

31 July 2022 3	Wil	2–0	Vaduz	Wil
				Stadium: Lidl Arena

5 August 2023 4	Schaffhausen	0–1	Wil

12 August 2023 5	Yverdon-Sport	1–3	Wil

26 August 2022 6	Wil	1–1	Thun	Wil
				Stadium: Lidl Arena

3 September 2023 7	Aarau	2–1	Wil

11 September 2022 8	Wil	5–1	Bellinzona	Wil
				Stadium: Lidl Arena

30 September 2023 9	Lausanne-Sport	4–0	Wil

8 October 2022 10	Wil	4–0	Yverdon-Sport	Wil
18:00		Report		Stadium: Lidl Arena

15 October 2023 11	Bellinzona	5–1	Wil
18:00		Report

8 April 2023 28	Wil	1–2	Thun	Wil
				Stadium: Lidl Arena

14 April 2023 29	Neuchâtel Xamax	0–1	Wil

21 April 2023 30	Wil	3–1	Schaffhausen

28 April 2023 31	Wil	1–2	Stade-Lausanne-Ouchy

5 May 2023 32	Aarau	0–0	Wil

12 May 2023 33	Bellinzona	3–2	Wil

20 May 2023 34	Wil	2–0	Vaduz

23 May 2023 35	Lausanne-Sport	2–0	Wil

27 May 2023 36	Wil	0–2	Yverdon-Sport

=== Swiss Cup ===
20 August 2022 Round 1	FC Littau	0–6	Wil	Littau
18:00 CEST (UTC+2)				Stadium: Ruopigen
