= 2024–25 FC Zürich season =

FC Zürich
2024–25 season
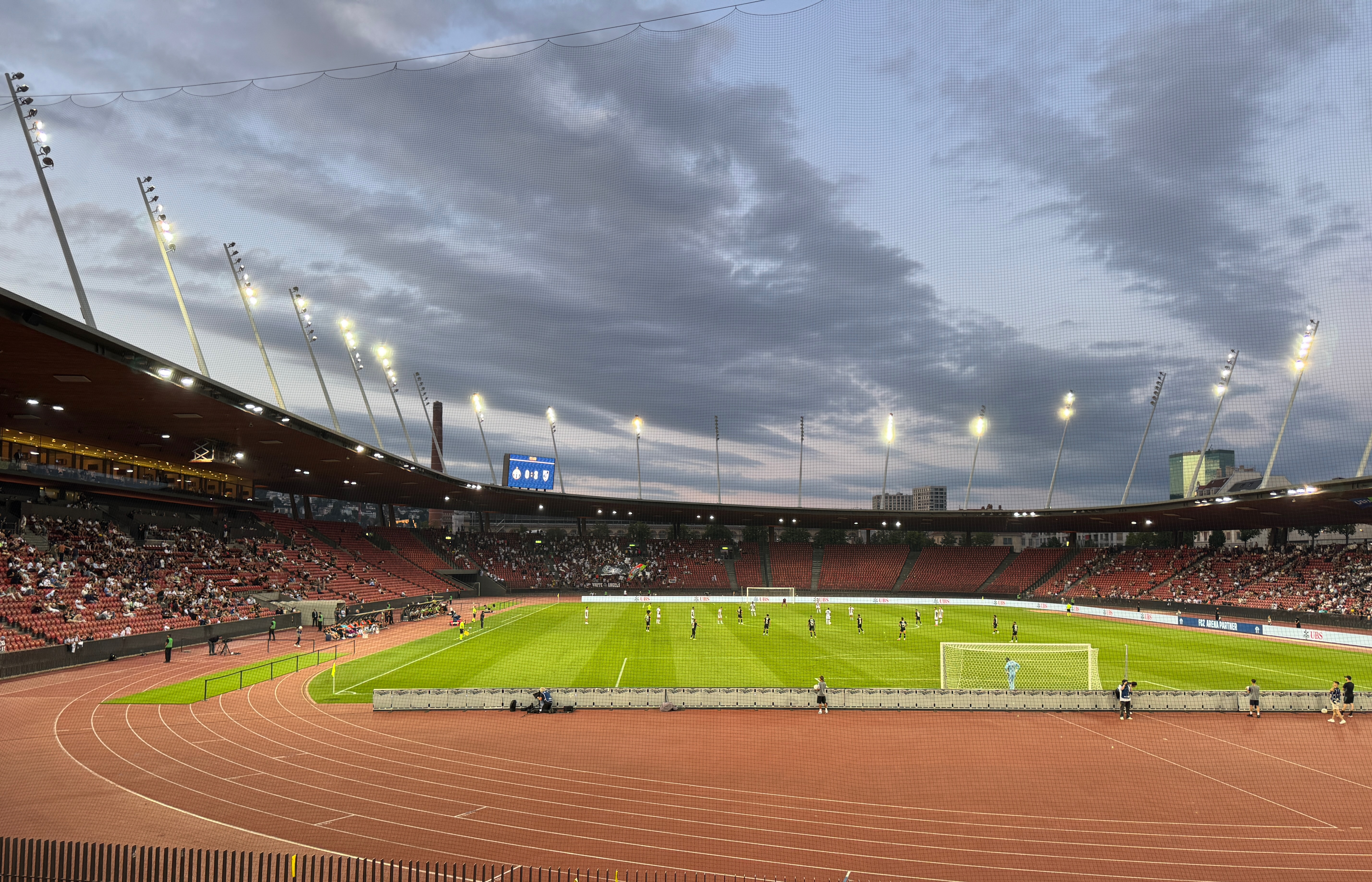
- Zürich hosting a European tie against Vitória at the Letzigrund on 8 August
- Manager: Ricardo Moniz
- Stadium: Letzigrund
- Swiss Super League: 7th
- Swiss Cup: Quarter-finals
- UEFA Conference League: Third qualifying round
- Top goalscorer: Juan José Perea (7)
Home colours	Away colours

The 2024–25 season was the 129th season in the history of FC Zürich, and the club's eighth-consecutive season in Swiss Super League. In addition to the domestic league, the team participated in the Swiss Cup and, after finishing fourth in the Super League the previous season, the UEFA Conference League.

The club finished the season in 7th place in the Super League, topping the bottom six after the late-season split. They won fifteen of their 38 games, amassing 53 points from a possible 114. They reached the quarter-finals of the Swiss Cup and the third qualifying round of the UEFA Conference League.

Colombian striker Juan José Perea, on loan from VfB Stuttgart, was the club's top league scorer with seven goals.

== Friendlies ==
Win Draw Loss Fixtures

=== Pre-season ===
Zürich won their opening three friendlies, at Dietikon, Regensdorf and at home to Wil. A draw followed, at Thun, on 6 July. A split squad travelled to Magdeburg six days later. The first match finished 4–0 to the hosts, the second was a 1–1 draw.

15 June 2024 Friendly	Dietikon	0–2	Zürich	Dietikon
11:00			Afriyie 22'; Marchesano 44'	Stadium: Sportanlage Dornau

15 June 2024 Friendly	FC Regensdorf	0–2	Zürich	Dietikon
12:00			Vukelić 27'; Ligue 31'	Stadium: Sportanlage Dornau; Attendance: 400

22 June 2024 Friendly	Zürich	5–4	FC Wil	Bauma
11:00	Reichmuth 20', 58'; Marchesano 37'; Bajrami 66'; Vukelić 69'	Report	Staubli 13'; Geiger 63'; Maier 71'; Dantas 114'	Stadium: Sportanlage Schwendi
Note: 2 x 60 minutes

6 July 2024 Friendly	Thun	0–0	Zürich
15:00

12 July 2024 Friendly	1. FC Magdeburg	4–0	Zürich	Benningen, Germany
11:00	Hercher 33'; Musonda 53'; Kaars 75'; Atik 88'			Stadium: FC Benningen Hauptfeld; Attendance: 300
Note: Match No.1

12 July 2024 Friendly	1. FC Magdeburg	1–1	Zürich	Benningen, Germany
13:00	Amaechi 30' (pen.)		Sabobo 45'	Stadium: FC Benningen Hauptfeld; Attendance: 300
Note: Match No.2

== Competitions ==
=== Overall record ===
Competition	First match	Last match	Starting round	Final position	Record							
Competition	First match	Last match	Starting round	Final position	Pld	W	D	L	GF	GA	GD	Win %
Swiss Super League	20 July 2024	22 May 2025	Matchday 1	7th	38	15	8	15	56	57	−1	39.47
Swiss Cup	18 August 2024	27 February 2025	Round 1	Quarter-finals	4	3	0	1	8	3	+5	75.00
UEFA Conference League	25 July 2024	15 August 2024	Second qualifying round	Third qualifying round	4	1	1	2	3	5	−2	25.00
Total					46	19	9	18	67	65	+2	41.30

Last updated: 15 December 2024
Source: Soccerway

=== Swiss Super League ===
The match schedule was released on 18 June 2024.

==== July ====
Zürich began the league campaign on 20 July with a 2–0 victory at Yverdon. Eight days later, they hosted FC Winterthur at the Letzigrund and maintained their 100% start with a 4–2 victory.

==== August ====
Young Boys were the opposition on 4 August, and the teams drew 2–2. A week later, Zürich beat Lausanne Sports 2–0 at home.

==== September ====
Zürich drew 1–1 with Luzern on 1 September. After a three-week break, they maintained their unbeaten start to the league season with a 2–0 victory at Basel. On 24 September, they suffered their first league defeat at St Gallen, but bounced back five days later with a single-goal home win over Sion.

==== October ====
On 6 October, Lugano returned home from Zürich with a point after a 1–1 draw. Two weeks later, in the Zürich derby, FC Zürich came out on top, beating Grasshoppers 2–1.

A defeat, 3–1 at home to Servette, followed on 27 October, before a 2–0 victory at Sion.

==== November ====
Zürich and Young Boys had to settle for a goalless draw at the Letzigrund on 2 November. A week later, Zürich drew again, at Servette, but went top of the table.

On 24 November, Zürich lost 4–1 at Lugano.

The month was closed out with a second Zürich derby. FC Zürich and Grasshoppers drew 1–1.

==== December ====
On 8 December, Zürich lost 3–0 at Lausanne Sports. A second-successive defeat followed, 2–0 at home to St Gallen.

==== January ====
Zürich's opening match of 2025 was a 1–0 home victory over Yverdon on 19 January. It was the hosts' first win since 30 October. A week later, they lost 3–1 at Luzern.

==== February ====
On 2 February, Zürich lost 1–0 at home to Basel. They returned to winning ways four days later, however, with a 2–0 scoreline at Winterthur.

St Gallen returned home from the Letzigrund with all three points on 9 February after a 2–0 victory. Another defeat followed, 2–1 at Sion, on 15 February.

Zürich made it three wins from three matches with Yverdon on 22 February, with a 2–1 scoreline.

==== March ====
On 2 March, Zürich travelled to Lugano and returned with all three points after a 3–0 win. A week later, they lost 3–1 at home to Servette.

Two victories followed: 3–2 at home to Luzern and 2–1 against Grasshoppers in the Zürich derby.

==== April ====
Zürich drew 2–2 with Lausanne on 2 April. This was followed by a goalless draw at Winterthur and a 4–0 home defeat to Basel.

On 21 April, Zürich lost 2–1 at Young Boys, meaning they had picked up two points from a possible twelve in April.

==== May ====
The final month of the campaign began with a 2–1 defeat at Sion on 4 May. Six days later, Zürich had more success in the city's derby, beating Grasshoppers 3–0.

On 13 May, Zürich beat Winterthur 4–1 at the Letzigrund.

The final two fixtures were both 3–2 defeats on the road, at St Gallen and Yverdon.

On 27 May, five days after the final match of the campaign, Ricardo Moniz was fired as manager.

==== League table ====
Pos	Team	Pld	W	D	L	GF	GA	GD	Pts	Qualification or relegation (Note: Teams play each other three times (33 matches), before the league is split into two groups (the top six and the bottom six).)
5	Lausanne-Sport	38	14	11	13	62	54	+8	53	Qualification for the Conference League second qualifying round
6	Luzern	38	14	10	14	66	64	+2	52	
7	Zürich	38	15	8	15	56	57	−1	53	
8	St. Gallen	38	13	13	12	52	53	−1	52	
9	Sion	38	11	11	16	47	57	−10	44	

Source: Swiss Super League
Rules for classification: 1) Points; 2) Goal difference; 3) Goals scored; 4) Head-to-head goal difference; 5) Head-to-head goals scored 6) Away goals scored; 7) Draw.

=== Swiss Cup ===
Zürich made it through the first three rounds without conceding a goal, with victories at Zug 94, Le Communal Sport Le Locie and "away" to Grasshopper. They were knocked out in the quarter-finals at home to Young Boys.

18 August 2024 First round	Zug 94	0–2	Zürich	Zug
16:00

Second round	FC Le Communal Sport Le Locle	0–3	Zürich
16:00

Third round	Grasshopper Club Zürich	0–1	Zürich	Letzigrund
16:00

27 February 2025 Quarter-finals	Zürich	2–3	Young Boys	Letzigrund
16:00

=== UEFA Conference League ===
Zürich entered the third qualifying round after beating League of Ireland side Shelbourne 3–0 on aggregate. They were knocked out by Portuguese club Vitória 5–0 on aggregate.

==== Second qualifying round ====
The draw was held on 18 June 2024.

25 July 2024 First leg	Zürich (Switzerland)	3–0	(Republic of Ireland) Shelbourne	Zürich
19:00 UTC+2	Mathew 1'; Marchesano 29', 58'	Report		Stadium: Letzigrund; Attendance: 8,676; Referee: Visar Kastrati (Kosovo)

1 August 2024 Second leg	Shelbourne (Republic of Ireland)	0–0 (0–3 agg.)	(Switzerland) Zürich	Dublin, Republic of Ireland
19:45 UTC+1		Report		Stadium: Tolka Park

==== Third qualifying round ====
The draw was held on 22 July 2024.

8 August 2024 First leg	Zürich (Switzerland)	0–3	(Portugal) Vitória de Guimarães	Zürich
19:00 UTC+2		Report		Stadium: Letzigrund

15 August 2024 Second leg	Vitória de Guimarães (Portugal)	2–0 (5–0 agg.)	(Switzerland) Zürich	Guimarães, Portugal
20:15 UTC+1		Report		Stadium: Estádio D. Afonso Henriques
