= Silvan Wallner =

Swiss footballer (born 2002)

Personal information
- Full name: Silvan Jeremy Wallner
- Date of birth: 15 January 2002 (age 24)
- Place of birth: Zürich, Switzerland
- Height: 1.85 m (6 ft 1 in)
- Position: Defender

Youth career
- –2020: Zürich

Senior career*
Years	Team	Apps	(Gls)
2019–2024	Zürich II	30	(2)
2020–2024	Zürich	43	(0)
2022–2023	→ Wil (loan)	35	(3)
2024	Blau-Weiß Linz	5	(0)
Total		113	(5)

International career
2018	Switzerland U17	1	(0)
2019	Switzerland U18	2	(0)
2022–2023	Switzerland U20	4	(0)
2021–2024	Switzerland U21	3	(0)
- * Club domestic league appearances and goals

Silvan Jeremy Wallner (born 15 January 2002) is a Swiss former professional footballer who played as a defender.

== Career ==
Having started his career with Zürich, Wallner signed for Austrian Bundesliga club Blau-Weiß Linz on a two-year deal in September 2024.

In November 2024, he announced his retirement from professional football, citing wanting to 'follow Jesus Christ' and having no intention to play football on Saturdays, 'the biblical day of rest' in the Seventh-day Adventist Church, as reasons for his decision.

== Career statistics ==
Appearances and goals by club, season and competition
Club	Season	League			National cup (Note: Includes Swiss Cup)		Continental		Other		Total	
Club	Season	Division	Apps	Goals	Apps	Goals	Apps	Goals	Apps	Goals	Apps	Goals
FC Zürich	2019–20	Swiss Super League	1	0	0	0	—		—		1	0
FC Zürich	2020–21	Swiss Super League	19	0	0	0	—		—		19	0
FC Zürich	2021–22	Swiss Super League	5	0	0	0	—		—		5	0
FC Zürich	2023–24	Swiss Super League	14	0	2	0	—		—		16	0
FC Zürich	2024–25	Swiss Super League	4	0	0	0	4 (Note: Appearances in UEFA Conference League)	0	—		8	0
FC Zürich	Total		43	0	2	0	4	0	—		49	0
Wil (loan)	2023–24	Swiss Challenge League	35	3	2	1	—		—		37	4
Blau-Weiß Linz	2024–25	Austrian Bundesliga	5	0	0	0	—		—		5	0
Career total			83	3	4	1	4	0	0	0	91	4
