= Behar Neziri =

Kosovan footballer (born 2003)

Personal information
- Date of birth: 6 January 2003 (age 23)
- Place of birth: Lauingen, Germany
- Height: 1.85 m (6 ft 1 in)
- Position: Defensive midfielder

Team information
- Current team: St. Gallen
- Number: 6

Youth career
- FC Augsburg
- 2016–2022: Bayern Munich

Senior career*
Years	Team	Apps	(Gls)
2022–2023	Bayern Munich II	17	(0)
2023–2025	St. Gallen U21	29	(4)
2024–2025	→ FC Wil (loan)	21	(1)
2025–	St. Gallen	19	(0)

International career^{‡}
2018	Kosovo U16	2	(0)
2021	Kosovo U19	3	(0)
2022–	Kosovo U21	8	(0)
- * Club domestic league appearances and goals as of 28 September 2026 ‡ National team caps and goals as of 14:25, 1 October 2025 (UTC)

Behar Neziri (born 6 January 2003) is a Kosovan professional footballer who plays as a defensive midfielder for the Swiss Super League club St. Gallen. Born in Germany, he is a Kosovo youth international.

== Club career ==
A youth product of German club FC Augsburg, Neziri joined the youth academy of Bundesliga giants Bayern Munich in 2016, and signed a contract with the latter on 30 April 2021 until 2023. He made his professional debut with Bayern Munich II in the Regionalliga in 2022.

On 3 July 2023, Neziri transferred to Swiss Super League club St. Gallen, signing a contract until 2025 and was assigned to their reserves in the Promotion League.

In August 2024, he extended his contract with St. Gallen until 2026, and joined FC Wil on loan for the 2024–25 season in the Swiss Challenge League.

In the summer of 2025, Neziri returned to St. Gallen and was promoted to their senior team, extending his contract until 2028.

== International career ==
Born in Lauingen, Germany, Neziri is of Kosovan descent and holds dual German-Kosovan citizenship. He is a youth international for Kosovo, having played up to the Kosovo U21s.
