= Daniel Denoon =

Swiss footballer (born 2003

Personal information
- Full name: Daniel Tyrell Denoon
- Date of birth: 28 January 2004 (age 22)
- Place of birth: Winterthur, Switzerland
- Height: 1.87 m (6 ft 2 in)
- Position: Defender

Team information
- Current team: Pisa
- Number: 44

Youth career
- FC Glattbrugg
- –2022: Zürich

Senior career*
Years	Team	Apps	(Gls)
2022–2024	Zürich II	33	(0)
2024–2026	Zürich	13	(0)
2025–2026	→ Pisa (loan)	2	(0)
2026–	Pisa	1	(0)

International career^{‡}
2022	Switzerland U18	2	(0)
2022	Switzerland U19	2	(0)
2025–	Switzerland U21	1	(0)
- * Club domestic league appearances and goals as of 30 August 2026 ‡ National team caps and goals as of 24 March 2025

Daniel Tyrell Denoon (born 28 January 2004) is a Swiss professional footballer who plays as a defender for Serie B club Pisa.

== Club career ==
As a youth player, Denoon joined the youth academy of Swiss side FC Glattbrugg. Following his stint there, he joined the youth academy of Swiss side FCZ at the age of eleven and was promoted to the club's reserve team in 2022, where he made thirty-three league appearances and scored zero goals before being promoted to their senior team ahead of the 2024–25 season. During the summer of 2025, he was sent on loan to Serie A side Pisa.

== International career ==
Denoon is a Switzerland youth international. On 21 March 2025, he debuted for the Switzerland national under-21 football team during a 0–2 away friendly loss to the Austria national under-21 football team.

== Style of play ==
Denoon plays as a defender. Italian news website Gianluca di Marzio wrote in 2025 that "physicality is one of his greatest strengths. A pure central defender, skilled at building with the ball and adding depth to the team... aggressive even in attack and on set pieces. Adept at heading and bringing the team forward".

== Conviction for fraud and driving offenses ==
On 18 November 2025, Denoon was convicted at the Bülach District Court on charges of commercial fraud, driving without authorization and gross violation of traffic rules in connection with exceeding the signaled speed limit.

The fraud was against Digitec Galaxus a Swiss online retailer, where he purchased items such as smart phones and headphones, then registered returns which did not contain the ordered item, but rather with waste which had the same weight. He was then able to claim the refund before the package arrived back at the vendor. He admitted to doing this 44 times for a total cost of more than 70,000 francs.

The punishment he received was two years in prison and a fine of 45,000 francs, both suspended for two years. In addition, there is a fine of 3,000 francs and the procedural costs of 5,000 francs. He has to pay back the 70,775 francs he had stolen from Digitec-Galaxus.
