= Nils Reichmuth =

Chilean footballer (born 2002)

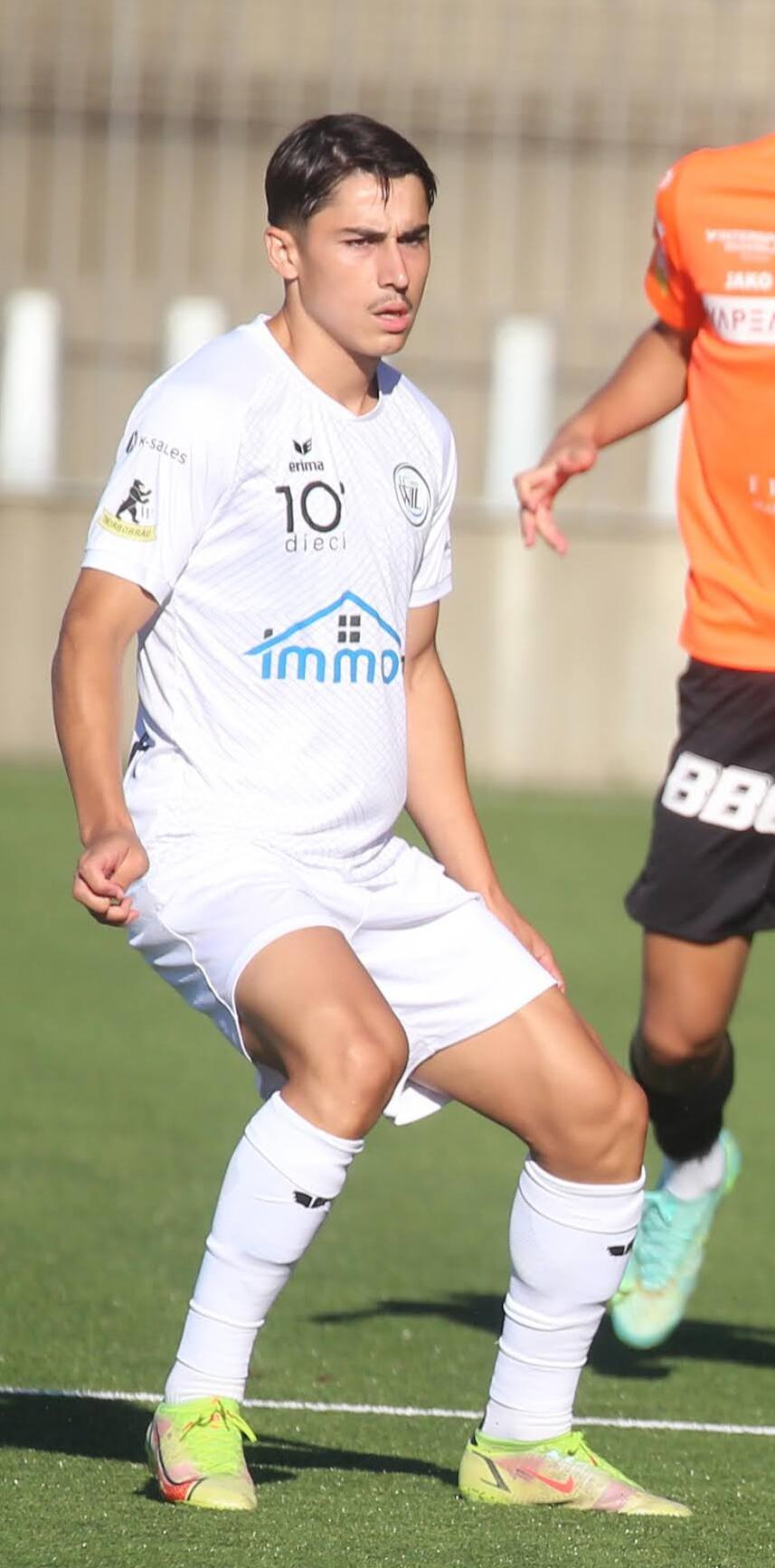
- Reichmuth in 2021

Personal information
- Full name: Nils Ramiro Mettler Reichmuth
- Date of birth: 22 February 2002 (age 24)
- Place of birth: Zug, Switzerland
- Height: 1.69 m (5 ft 7 in)
- Position: Midfielder

Team information
- Current team: Thun
- Number: 70

Youth career
- –2020: Zürich

Senior career*
Years	Team	Apps	(Gls)
2019–2024	Zürich II	41	(8)
2020–2024	Zürich	15	(1)
2021–2023	→ Wil (loan)	47	(4)
2024–	Thun	70	(13)

International career^{‡}
2019	Switzerland U17	2	(1)
2022	Switzerland U20	1	(1)
2024	Switzerland U21	2	(0)
2026–	Chile	3	(0)
- * Club domestic league appearances and goals as of 10 October 2026 ‡ National team caps and goals as of 29 September 2026

Nils Ramiro Mettler Reichmuth (born 22 February 2002) is a professional footballer who plays as a midfielder for Swiss Super League club Thun. Born in Switzerland, he plays for the Chile national team.

== Club career ==
Reichmuth helped Thun win the 2024–25 Swiss Challenge League, and the following season their first ever first division title, the 2025–26 Swiss Super League.

== International career ==
Reichmuth is a former Switzerland youth international, having played official matches at under-17 and under-21 levels.

On 11 May 2026, Reichmuth's request to switch allegiance to Chile was approved by FIFA.

== Personal life ==
Reichmuth was born in Switzerland to a Swiss father and a Chilean mother. His younger brother, Miguel Raffael, is also a footballer who plays for Zürich.

== Career statistics ==
=== Club ===
As of match played 15 October 2026

Appearances and goals by club, season and competition
Club	Season	League			Swiss Cup		Continental		Other		Total	
Club	Season	Division	Apps	Goals	Apps	Goals	Apps	Goals	Apps	Goals	Apps	Goals
Zürich II	2019–20	Swiss Promotion League	0	0	—		—		—		0	0
Zürich II	2020–21	Swiss Promotion League	14	1	—		—		5 (Note: Appearances in promotion play-offs)	2	19	3
Zürich II	2021–22	Swiss Promotion League	3	2	—		—		—		3	2
Zürich II	2023–24	Swiss Promotion League	24	5	—		—		—		24	5
Zürich II	Total		41	8	—		—		5	2	46	10
Zürich	2019–20	Swiss Super League	2	0	0	0	—		0	0	2	0
Zürich	2020–21	Swiss Super League	4	0	0	0	—		—		4	0
Zürich	2023–24	Swiss Super League	9	1	1	0	—		—		10	1
Zürich	Total		15	1	1	0	—		0	0	16	1
Wil (loan)	2021–22	Swiss Challenge League	18	1	1	0	—		—		19	1
Wil (loan)	2022–23	Swiss Challenge League	29	3	3	1	—		—		32	4
Wil (loan)	Total		47	4	4	1	—		—		51	5
Thun	2024–25	Swiss Challenge League	28	7	2	1	—		—		30	8
Thun	2025–26	Swiss Super League	32	4	1	0	—		—		33	4
Thun	2026–27	Swiss Super League	10	2	0	0	7 (Note: Two appearances in UEFA Champions League, five appearances in UEFA Europa League)	0	—		17	2
Thun	Total		70	13	3	1	7	0	—		80	14
Career total			173	26	8	2	7	0	5	2	193	30

=== International ===
As of match played 29 September 2026

Appearances and goals by national team and year
National team	Year	Apps	Goals
Chile	2026	3	0
Total		3	0

== Honours ==
Thun

- Swiss Super League: 2025–26
- Swiss Challenge League: 2024–25
