= Noah Rupp =

Swiss footballer (born 2003)

Personal information
- Full name: Noah Manuel Rupp
- Date of birth: 13 August 2003 (age 23)
- Place of birth: Zug, Switzerland
- Height: 1.84 m (6 ft 0 in)
- Position: Midfielder

Team information
- Current team: Wil
- Number: 10

Youth career
- SC Menzingen
- –2021: Luzern

Senior career*
Years	Team	Apps	(Gls)
2021–2024	Luzern	9	(0)
2021–2024	Luzern U21	53	(15)
2024–2026	Karlsruher SC	1	(0)
2024–2026	Karlsruher SC II	10	(2)
2025	→ Lausanne Ouchy (loan)	16	(1)
2025–2026	→ Thun (loan)	16	(0)
2026–	Wil	8	(1)

International career
2018–2019	Switzerland U16	8	(5)
2019	Switzerland U17	8	(1)
2021	Switzerland U19	4	(0)
2022–2023	Switzerland U20	3	(1)
- * Club domestic league appearances and goals as of 30 September 2026

Noah Manuel Rupp (born 13 August 2003) is a Swiss professional footballer who plays for Swiss Challenge League club Wil.

== Club career ==
He made his Swiss Super League debut for Luzern on 8 August 2021 in a game against Zürich. Four days later, he made his European debut in a Conference League qualifier against Feyenoord.

On 24 April 2024, Rupp signed a contract with German club Karlsruher SC, effective 1 July. On 30 January 2025, Karlsruher loaned him to Lausanne Ouchy.

On 29 August 2025, he was loaned to recently promoted FC Thun in the Swiss Super League. He helped Thun win their first league title in the 2025–26 season.

On 16 July 2026, Rupp signed a three-year contract with Wil.

== Honours ==
Thun

- Swiss Super League: 2025–26
