= Hussayn Touati =

French footballer (born 2003)

Personal information
- Date of birth: 3 October 2001 (age 25)
- Place of birth: Pontoise, France
- Height: 1.79 m (5 ft 10 in)
- Position: Winger

Team information
- Current team: Oleksandriya
- Number: 24

Youth career
- Entente SSG
- 2016–2019: Lyon
- 2019–2021: Paris Saint-Germain

Senior career*
Years	Team	Apps	(Gls)
2022–2023	Servette U21	18	(11)
2022–2024	Servette	18	(2)
2024	→ Wil (loan)	7	(0)
2024–2025	Neuchâtel Xamax	25	(3)
2025–	Oleksandriya	21	(3)
- * Club domestic league appearances and goals as of 3 June 2026

Hussayn Touati (born 3 October 2001) is a French professional footballer who plays as a winger for Ukrainian Premier League club Oleksandriya.

== Career ==
Touati is a youth product of Entente SSG and Lyon, before finishing his development with Paris Saint-Germain moving on 19 July 2019 signing a contract until 2021. He was released by PSG in the summer of 2021, and spent a year training without a club. In the summer of 2022, he moved to the reserves of the Swiss club Servette, and after strong performances was called up to their senior team in the Swiss Super League. On 25 April 2023, he extended his contract with Servette for two more seasons.

On 5 February 2024, Touati was loaned by Wil.

On 27 June 2024, he was transferred to Neuchâtel Xamax with immediate effect.

== International career ==
Touati was born in France to a Moroccan father and Algerian mother. He holds both French and Algerian nationalities. He was called up to the Algeria U20s for the 2020 UNAF U-20 Tournament, but had to pull out due to injury.
