= Simone Rapp =

Swiss footballer (born 1992)

Personal information
- Date of birth: 1 October 1992 (age 34)
- Place of birth: Cugnasco, Switzerland
- Height: 1.93 m (6 ft 4 in)
- Position: Forward

Team information
- Current team: Thun (sporting director)

Youth career
- Team Ticino

Senior career*
Years	Team	Apps	(Gls)
2010–2013	Locarno	57	(6)
2013	Basel U21	11	(2)
2013–2015	Wohlen	57	(18)
2015–2018	Thun	81	(25)
2018–2021	Lausanne-Sport	27	(8)
2019	→ St. Gallen (loan)	16	(2)
2019–2020	→ Thun (loan)	32	(6)
2021	Sepsi OSK	2	(0)
2021–2022	Vaduz	24	(16)
2022–2023	Karlsruher SC	28	(3)
2023–2024	Neuchâtel Xamax	30	(4)
2024–2026	Wil	58	(11)

International career
2011	Switzerland U19	3	(0)
2011–2012	Switzerland U20	8	(1)
2013	Switzerland U21	1	(0)

Managerial career
- 2026–: Thun (sporting director)
- * Club domestic league appearances and goals

Simone Rapp (born 1 October 1992) is a Swiss professional football official and a former forward. He is the sporting director for Thun.

== Career ==
Rapp was loaned out from Thun to St. Gallen on 7 January 2019 for the rest of the season.

On 7 June 2021, he signed a two-year contract with Vaduz.

On 18 July 2023, Rapp returned to Switzerland and signed with Neuchâtel Xamax.

On 21 June 2024, Rapp agreed to move to Wil on a two-season contract.

== Career statistics ==
As of match played 15 April 2018

Appearances and goals by club, season and competition
Club	Season	League			National cup		League cup		Other		Total	
Club	Season	Division	Apps	Goals	Apps	Goals	Apps	Goals	Apps	Goals	Apps	Goals
Locarno	2010–11	Swiss Challenge League	16	3	0	0	—		—		16	3
Locarno	2011–12	Swiss Challenge League	23	2	0	0	—		—		23	2
Locarno	2012–13	Swiss Challenge League	18	1	1	0	—		—		19	1
Locarno	Total		57	6	1	0	0	0	0	0	58	6
Wohlen	2013–14	Swiss Challenge League	24	6	1	0	—		—		25	6
Wohlen	2014–15	Swiss Challenge League	33	12	2	0	—		—		35	12
Wohlen	Total		57	18	3	0	0	0	0	0	60	18
Thun	2015–16	Swiss Super League	30	7	2	0	—		6	0	38	7
Thun	2016–17	Swiss Super League	33	9	0	0	—		—		33	9
Thun	2017–18	Swiss Super League	18	9	3	3	—		—		21	12
Thun	Total		81	25	5	3	0	0	6	0	92	28
Lausanne-Sport	2017–18	Swiss Super League	8	1	0	0	—		—		8	1
Career total			203	50	9	3	0	0	6	0	218	53

== Honours ==
Individual

- Swiss Super League Team of the Year: 2017–18
