= Marco Hämmerli =

Swiss footballer (born 1985)

Personal information
- Date of birth: 7 May 1985 (age 41)
- Place of birth: Flawil, Switzerland
- Height: 1.74 m (5 ft 9 in)
- Position: Defender

Team information
- Current team: Wil (manager)

Youth career
- Wil

Senior career*
Years	Team	Apps	(Gls)
2001–2006	Wil	37	(3)
2003	→ Gossau (loan)		
2006–2008	Thun	34	(1)
2008–2013	St. Gallen	80	(4)
2008–2013	→ St. Gallen II	22	(4)
2013–2014	Tuggen	20	(2)
2014–2018	Gossau	65	(16)

International career
2004	Switzerland U20	1	(0)

Managerial career
- 2018–2020: St. Gallen (U18)
- 2020–2023: St. Gallen (U21)
- 2023–2024: St. Gallen (U19)
- 2024–: Wil
- * Club domestic league appearances and goals

Marco Hämmerli (born 7 May 1985) is a Swiss football coach and a former defender who is the manager of Wil.

== Coaching career ==
On 24 May 2024, Hämmerli signed a contract with Wil in Swiss Challenge League.
