= Ramon Guzzo =

Swiss footballer (born 2004)

Personal information
- Full name: Ramon Francesco Guzzo
- Date of birth: 5 July 2004 (age 22)
- Place of birth: Baden, Switzerland
- Height: 2.00 m (6 ft 7 in)
- Position: Centre-back

Team information
- Current team: Aarau
- Number: 3

Youth career
- 2011–2013: Wettingen
- 2014–2018: SC YF Juventus
- 2018–2021: Grasshoppers
- 2021–2022: Zürich

Senior career*
Years	Team	Apps	(Gls)
2022–2025	Zürich	1	(0)
2022–2025	Zürich U21	57	(0)
2024–2025	→ Wil (loan)	27	(1)
2025–	Aarau	31	(0)

International career^{‡}
2019	Switzerland U15	4	(0)
2019	Switzerland U16	3	(0)
2022	Switzerland U18	2	(0)
2022	Switzerland U19	8	(0)
2024	Switzerland U20	2	(0)
2025	Switzerland U21	2	(0)
- * Club domestic league appearances and goals as of 18 September 2026 ‡ National team caps and goals as of 8 September 2025

Ramon Francesco Guzzo (born 5 July 2004) is a Swiss professional footballer who plays as a centre-back for Swiss Challenge League club Aarau.

== Career ==
Guzzo is a youth product of the academies of Wettingen, SC YF Juventus and Grasshoppers, before finishing his development at Zürich in 2021. He made his senior and professional debut with Zürich as a late substitute in a 4–1 Swiss Super League win over Servette FC on 13 November 2022. On 3 January 2023, he signed a professional contract with the club until 2026. He was promoted to Zürich's senior team in the summer of 2023 in preparation for the 2022–23 season.

On 12 June 2024, Guzzo was loaned to Wil for the 2024–25 season.

== International career ==
Born in Switzerland, Guzzo is of Italian descent. He is a youth international for Switzerland, having played up to the Switzerland U19s.
