= Cristian Souza =

Uruguayan footballer (born 1995)

Personal information
- Full name: Cristian Souza España
- Date of birth: 28 August 1995 (age 31)
- Place of birth: Montevideo, Uruguay
- Height: 1.72 m (5 ft 8 in)
- Position: Midfielder

Team information
- Current team: Cienciano
- Number: 7

Youth career
- Central Español

Senior career*
Years	Team	Apps	(Gls)
2015–2016	Rentistas	16	(0)
2016	Danubio	5	(0)
2017	Sud América	32	(1)
2018	Liverpool (Montevideo)	34	(4)
2019	Cusco	31	(6)
2020	Pachuca	12	(0)
2021	Cerro Largo	8	(0)
2021–2023	Bellinzona	61	(14)
2023–2025	Sion	49	(2)
2025	→ Bellinzona (loan)	13	(2)
2025–	Cienciano	14	(1)
- * Club domestic league appearances and goals as of 30 December 2025

Cristian Souza España (born 28 August 1995) is a Uruguayan professional footballer who plays as a midfielder for Peruvian club Cienciano.

== Career ==
As a youth player, Souza joined the youth academy of Uruguayan second division side Central Español. Souza started his career with Rentistas in the Uruguayan top flight, where he made 16 league appearances. On 18 October 2015, Souza debuted for Rentistas in a 1–0 defeat to Peñarol.

Before the 2019 season, he signed for Peruvian club Cusco, where he received interest from Universitario (Peru). Before the second half of 2019–20, he signed for Mexican outfit Pachuca. Before the 2021 season, Souza signed for Cerro Largo in the Uruguayan top flight. In 2021, he signed for Swiss third division side Bellinzona.

On 16 July 2023, Souza signed with Sion. On 24 January 2025, he returned to Bellinzona on loan.
