= Usman Simbakoli =

Central African footballer

Personal information
- Full name: Usman Mamadou Simbakoli
- Date of birth: December 12, 2001 (age 24)
- Place of birth: Bangui, Central African Republic
- Height: 1.89 m (6 ft 2 in)
- Position: Forward

Team information
- Current team: Angers SCO
- Number: 17

Youth career
- Melun
- Vaillante Angers
- 2018–2020: Angers

Senior career*
Years	Team	Apps	(Gls)
2020–2022	Lille II	21	(9)
2021	→Stade Lavallois (loan)	3	(0)
2022–2024	Étoile Carouge	49	(26)
2024–2025	Servette	14	(1)
2025	→Étoile Carouge (loan)	12	(3)
2025–2026	RWDM Brussels	27	(12)
2026–	Angers	0	(0)
- * Club domestic league appearances and goals as of 18:45, 20 July 2026 (UTC)

Usman Mamadou Simbakoli (born 12 December 2001) is a Central African footballer who plays as a forward for Ligue 1 club Angers.

== Early life ==
Simbakoli was born in Bangui, Central African Republic, and grew up in Combs-la-Ville in France, where he played futsal before joining Melun FC as a youngster. He followed that up with stints at Vaillante Angers FC, before moving to Angers SCO in 2018 where he finished his development. On 3 July 2020, he signed for Lille, and was loaned to Laval in January 2021 for the remainder of the season.

In July 2022, Simbakoli moved to Switzerland with Étoile Carouge FC in the Promotion League. After strong seasons there, he earned a move to the Swiss Super League club Servette FC on 17 July 2024. He returned to Étoile Carouge on a six-month loan on 27 January 2025.

On 14 July 2025, Simbakoli signed for Challenger Pro League club RWDM Brussels, on a three-year contract. After scoring 15 goals in 29 appearances with RWDM, he returned to Angers SCO in Ligue 1, signing a three-year contract.

== Honours ==
Étoile Carouge FC

- Promotion League: 2023–24
