= Sadin Crnovršanin =

Swiss footballer (born 2002)

Personal information
- Date of birth: 4 February 2002 (age 24)
- Place of birth: Bern, Switzerland
- Height: 1.86 m (6 ft 1 in)
- Position: Defender

Team information
- Current team: Young Boys II
- Number: 5

Youth career
- –2014: Bern
- 2014–2021: Young Boys

Senior career*
Years	Team	Apps	(Gls)
2019–2025	Young Boys II	65	(2)
2024–2025	Young Boys	2	(0)
2025	→ Wil (loan)	15	(0)
2025–2026	SSV Ulm	2	(0)
2026–	Young Boys II	2	(0)
- * Club domestic league appearances and goals as of 1 October 2026

Sadin Crnovršanin (born 4 February 2002) is a Swiss professional footballer who plays as a defender for Young Boys II.

== Career ==
He grew up in Bern, and moved from FC Bern to the Young Boys youth team in 2014. He is a central defender, and played 27 games for their BSC Young Boys II in the Swiss Promotion League during the 2023-24 season, whilst also training regularly with the Young Boys first-team.

He made his debut in the Swiss Super League on 1 April 2024 in a 0-0 draw away against Yverdon as a substitute for the injured Fabian Lustenberger. He signed a new two-year professional contract with the club in May 2024.

On 7 January 2025, Crnovršanin was loaned by Wil.

On 23 May 2025, Crnovršanin joined SSV Ulm in German 3. Liga on a two-season deal.
