= Edin Omeragić =

Swiss footballer (born 2002)

Personal information
- Date of birth: 20 March 2002 (age 24)
- Place of birth: Geneva, Switzerland
- Height: 1.95 m (6 ft 5 in)
- Position: Goalkeeper

Team information
- Current team: Reims
- Number: 12

Youth career
- 2009–2020: Servette

Senior career*
Years	Team	Apps	(Gls)
2019–2024	Servette U21	13	(0)
2020–2024	Servette	5	(0)
2023–2024	→ Nyon (loan)	34	(0)
2024–2026	Xamax	66	(0)
2026–	Reims	0	(0)

International career^{‡}
2016	Switzerland U15	2	(0)
2022	Switzerland U20	1	(0)
- * Club domestic league appearances and goals as of 26 May 2026 ‡ National team caps and goals as of 23 September 2022

Edin Omeragić (born 20 March 2002) is a Swiss footballer who plays for French Ligue 2 club Reims.

== Club career ==
He joined the youth teams of Servette at the age of 7 and started playing for their U21 squad in the 2. Liga Interregional in 2019.

He made his Swiss Super League debut for Servette on 3 October 2021 in a game against Young Boys. He came on as a substitute in the 45th minute after Jérémy Frick was sent off and allowed 6 goals in the remaining time of a 0–6 home loss.

On 13 July 2024, Omeragić signed with Xamax.

On 8 July 2026, Omeragić joined Reims in France on a three-year deal.

== Personal life ==
His father Nihad Omeragić and uncle Nedžad immigrated to Switzerland from Bosnia and Herzegovina as refugees and played in the lower Swiss leagues for Urania Genève Sport. His cousins Bećir Omeragić and Nedim Omeragić (sons of Nedžad) are also professional footballers.
