= David Jacovic =

Swiss footballer (born 2001)

Personal information
- Date of birth: 5 February 2001 (age 25)
- Place of birth: St. Gallen, Switzerland
- Height: 1.86 m (6 ft 1 in)
- Position: Midfielder

Team information
- Current team: Wil
- Number: 4

Youth career
- –2019: St. Gallen

Senior career*
Years	Team	Apps	(Gls)
2017–2023	St. Gallen II	76	(13)
2021–2023	St. Gallen	2	(0)
2023–	Wil	87	(3)

International career^{‡}
2018	Switzerland U17	2	(0)
2019	Switzerland U18	2	(0)
2019	Switzerland U19	5	(1)
- * Club domestic league appearances and goals as of 30 September 2026 ‡ National team caps and goals as of 20:46, 31 May 2022 (UTC)

David Jacovic (born 5 February 2001) is a Swiss footballer who plays as a midfielder for Wil.

== Club career ==
He was raised in the youth system of St. Gallen and began playing for their U21 squad in Swiss 1. Liga in 2017.

He made his Swiss Super League debut for St. Gallen on 21 May 2021 in a game against Servette.

On 3 July 2023, Jacovic signed a two-year contract with Wil.

== International career ==
Born in Switzerland, Jacovic is of Serbian descent. He represented Switzerland at the 2018 UEFA European Under-17 Championship, they did not advance from the group stage.
