= Giovani Bamba =

Swiss footballer (born 1999)

Personal information
- Date of birth: 2 July 1999 (age 27)
- Place of birth: Fribourg, Switzerland
- Height: 1.92 m (6 ft 4 in)
- Position: Midfielder

Team information
- Current team: Vizela
- Number: 6

Senior career*
Years	Team	Apps	(Gls)
2016–2017	FC Richemond		
2017	FC Bulle		
2018	Sion II	10	(0)
2019	FC Wohlen	6	(0)
2019–2020	Stade Nyonnais	14	(2)
2020–2024	Stade Lausanne Ouchy	119	(6)
2024–2025	Xamax	32	(1)
2025–	Vizela	6	(0)
2026	→ Puerto Cabello (loan)	10	(0)
- * Club domestic league appearances and goals as of 14 September 2026

Giovani Bamba (born 2 July 1999) is a Swiss footballer who plays as a midfielder for Liga Portugal 2 club Vizela. He was called-up to the Angola national team in 2021 but did not appear in a match.

== Early life ==
Bamba is a native of Fribourg, Switzerland.

== Club career ==
In 2020, Bamba signed for Swiss side Stade Lausanne Ouchy, helping the club achieve promotion.

On 24 June 2024, Bamba signed with Xamax.

On 19 June 2025, Bamba joined Vizela in Portugal on a two-year deal.

== International career ==
Bamba was called up to the Angola national team for the 2021 Africa Cup of Nations qualification.

== Style of play ==
Bamba mainly operates as a defensive midfielder.

== Personal life ==
Bamba is of Angolan descent.
