= Sidiki Camara =

Ivorian footballer (born 2003)

Personal information
- Full name: Sidiki Franck Camara
- Date of birth: 23 August 2002 (age 24)
- Place of birth: Geneva, Switzerland
- Height: 1.78 m (5 ft 10 in)
- Position: Midfielder

Team information
- Current team: Étoile Carouge
- Number: 14

Youth career
- 2010–2021: Servette

Senior career*
Years	Team	Apps	(Gls)
2020–2024	Servette U21	42	(7)
2021–2026	Servette	5	(0)
2023–2024	→ Stade Nyonnais (loan)	32	(3)
2024–2025	→ Étoile Carouge (loan)	23	(1)
2025–2026	→ Yverdon-Sport (loan)	16	(1)
2026–	Étoile Carouge	9	(1)

International career^{‡}
2023	Ivory Coast U23	1	(0)
- * Club domestic league appearances and goals as of 18 September 2026 ‡ National team caps and goals as of 00:46, 8 June 2023 (UTC)

Sidiki Franck Camara (born 23 August 2002) is a professional footballer who plays as a midfielder for Swiss Challenge League club Étoile Carouge. Born in Switzerland, he is a youth international for Ivory Coast.

== Club career ==
Camara is a pure youth product of Servette, having joined their academy at the age of 7. He made his senior and professional debut with Servette as a late substitute in a 5–1 Swiss Super League tie with St. Gallen on 12 February 2022. On 6 July 2022, he signed his first professional contract with the club until 2025.

== International career ==
Born in Switzerland, Camara is of Ivorian descent. He was called up to the Ivory Coast U23s for the 2023 Maurice Revello Tournament.

== Playing style ==
Camara is a strong and intelligent midfielder who can play as a 6 or 8 thanks to his anticipation and game knowledge. His intercepting helps him in defensive midfield, and his vision in central midfield. He is quick and dynamic physically and mentally, which allows him to make good decisions in complex situations.
