= Florian Hoxha =

Kosovan footballer (born 2001)

Personal information
- Date of birth: 22 February 2001 (age 25)
- Place of birth: Bülach, Switzerland
- Height: 1.77 m (5 ft 10 in)
- Position: Left-back

Team information
- Current team: Étoile Carouge
- Number: 3

Youth career
- –2015: FC Embrach
- 2015–2019: Grasshoppers

Senior career*
Years	Team	Apps	(Gls)
2018–2024	Grasshoppers U21	52	(1)
2021–2026	Grasshoppers	27	(0)
2025	→ Schaffhausen (loan)	16	(1)
2025	→ Vaduz (loan)	14	(1)
2026	→ Étoile Carouge (loan)	13	(2)
2026–	Étoile Carouge	6	(0)

International career^{‡}
2021	Kosovo U21	5	(0)
- * Club domestic league appearances and goals as of 30 September 2026 ‡ National team caps and goals as of 16 November 2021

Florian Hoxha (born 22 February 2001) is a footballer who plays as a left-back for Swiss Challenge League club Étoile Carouge. Born in Switzerland, he represents Kosovo at under-21 international level.

== Club career ==
Hoxha started playing football at FC Embrach until 2015, where he transferred to Grasshoppers and played with the U17 and U18 teams, where he was later promoted to the U21 team with whom he debuted on 17 March 2018 in a 2–2 away draw against FC Sursee after being named in the starting line-up.

On 31 July 2021, Hoxha was named as a first team substitute for the first time in a league match against Young Boys. His debut with Grasshoppers came fifteen days later in the 2021–22 Swiss Cup first round against FC Widnau after being named in the starting line-up. Six days after debut, he made his league debut in a 2–1 away defeat against Zürich after being named in the starting line-up.

He continued playing for both the main and reserve squads, making five more appearances with the first team. Sadly, on 19 March 2022, he suffered a rupture to his ACL in a U21 match, which ruled him out for the majority of the year. He returned to training late in 2022, appearing in a test game against Altach. He gave his return in the first team on 29 April 2023, coming on in the last minutes of a 5–1 away defeat to Lugano.

He scored his first goal for Grasshoppers in their Swiss Cup opening round match against SV Schaffhausen from the 2. Liga Interregional, the 5th tier of Swiss football, where he scored the first goal of the 4–0 away victory.

He extended his contract with Grasshoppers for a further two years on 28 May 2024, until summer 2026. On 8 January 2025, he joined FC Schaffhausen in the Swiss Challenge League on loan until the end of the season.

On 15 July 2025, he joined Challenge League side FC Vaduz on loan until 31 December 2025.

On 21 January 2026, he joined Étoile Carouge on loan for the remainder of the season.

== International career ==
On 15 March 2021, Hoxha received a call-up from Kosovo U21 for the friendly matches against Qatar U23. Eleven days later, he made his debut with Kosovo U21 in first match against Qatar U23 after being named in the starting line-up.

That same year, he started four games for Kosovo U21 in their Euro U21 qualifying campaign.
