= Stéphane Cueni =

Cape Verdean football player (born 2001)

Personal information
- Full name: Stéphane Edi Cueni
- Date of birth: 14 March 2001 (age 25)
- Place of birth: Lausanne, Switzerland
- Height: 1.80 m (5 ft 11 in)
- Position: Midfielder

Team information
- Current team: Winterthur
- Number: 44

Youth career
- 2009–2017: Lausanne-Sport

Senior career*
| Years | Team | Apps | (Gls) |
| 2018–2020 | Team Vaud U21 | 35 | (2) |
| 2021–2023 | Lausanne-Sport | 6 | (0) |
| 2021–2022 | → Stade Lausanne Ouchy (loan) | 22 | (0) |
| 2022–2023 | → Wil (loan) | 27 | (0) |
| 2023–2025 | Wil | 51 | (0) |
| 2025– | Winterthur | 47 | (0) |

International career^{‡}
| 2016–2017 | Switzerland U16 | 4 | (0) |
| 2019–2020 | Switzerland U19 | 5 | (0) |
| 2020 | Switzerland U20 | 1 | (0) |
| 2025– | Cape Verde | 2 | (0) |
- * Club domestic league appearances and goals as of 28 September 2026 ‡ National team caps and goals as of 15 June 2025

Stéphane Edi Cueni (French: [ste.ˈfan e.ˈdi ky.e.ˈni]; born 14 March 2001) is a professional footballer who plays as a midfielder for Swiss Super League club Winterthur. Born in Switzerland, he plays for the Cape Verde national team.

== Club career ==
On 13 January 2021, Cueni signed his first professional contract with Lausanne-Sport. He made his professional debut with the club in a 3–1 Swiss Super League loss to Basel on 4 February 2021.

On 4 August 2022, Cueni moved to Wil on a season-long loan.

On 19 June 2023, Wil made the transfer permanent and signed a three-year contract with Cueni.

== International career ==
Born in Switzerland, Cueni is of Cape Verdean descent. He is a youth international for Switzerland.

On 8 April 2025, Cueni's request to switch international allegiance to Cape Verde was approved by FIFA. In May 2025, Cueni was called up to the Cape Verde national team for a set of friendlies. He debuted with Cape Verde in a friendly 1–1 tie with Malaysia on 29 May 2025.
