= Nico Maier =

Swiss footballer (born 2000)

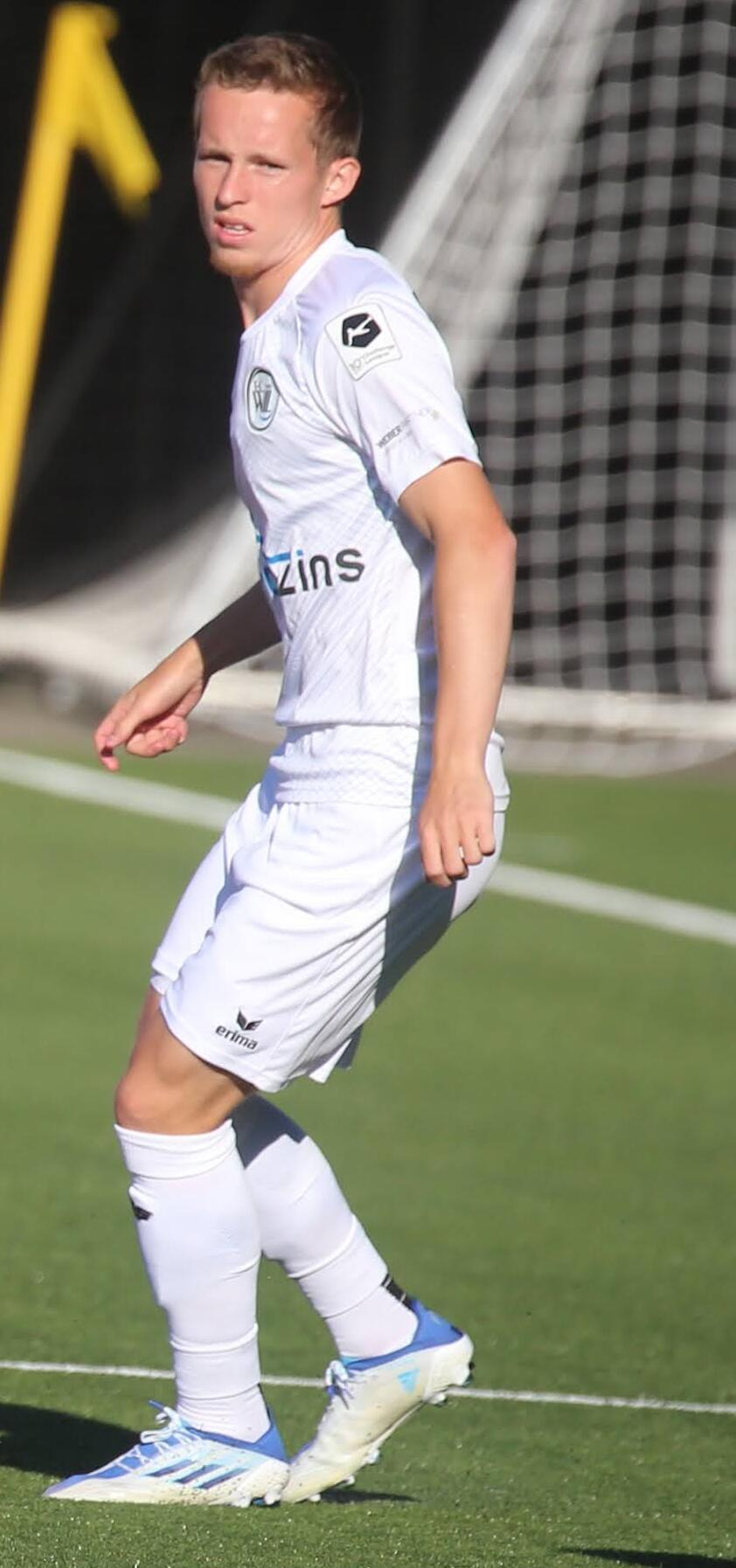
- Maier in 2021

Personal information
- Date of birth: 2 July 2000 (age 26)
- Place of birth: Bern, Switzerland
- Height: 1.73 m (5 ft 8 in)
- Position: Midfielder

Team information
- Current team: Thun
- Number: 30

Youth career
- –2020: Young Boys

Senior career*
| Years | Team | Apps | (Gls) |
| 2018–2022 | Young Boys U21 | 51 | (26) |
| 2020–2023 | Young Boys | 5 | (0) |
| 2022–2023 | → Wil (loan) | 24 | (5) |
| 2023–2025 | Wil | 61 | (12) |
| 2025–2026 | BW Linz | 21 | (4) |
| 2026– | Thun | 9 | (1) |

International career^{‡}
| 2014 | Switzerland U15 | 1 | (0) |
- * Club domestic league appearances and goals as of 28 September 2026 ‡ National team caps and goals as of 25 April 2021

Nico Maier (born 2 July 2000) is a Swiss professional footballer who plays as a midfielder for Swiss Super League club Thun.

== Club career ==
After having signed his first professional contract mid-2020–21 season, Nico Maier made his professional debut for BSC Young Boys on the 22 April 2021, coming on as a substitute in a 2–1 Swiss Super League away win against FC Zürich, while Young Boys had just become national champions.

Only three days later, he made his first debut for Bern, delivering his first assist on Mambimbi's opening goal, helping his team achieving a 2–1 win against FC Sion.

On 14 June 2022, Maier joined Wil on a season-long loan. On 19 June 2023, Wil made the transfer permanent and signed a two-year contract with Maier.

On 22 June 2025, he signed with BW Linz in the Austrian Bundesliga on a three-year deal.

== Honours ==
Young Boys

- Swiss Super League: 2020–21
