= Rilind Nivokazi =

Kosovan footballer

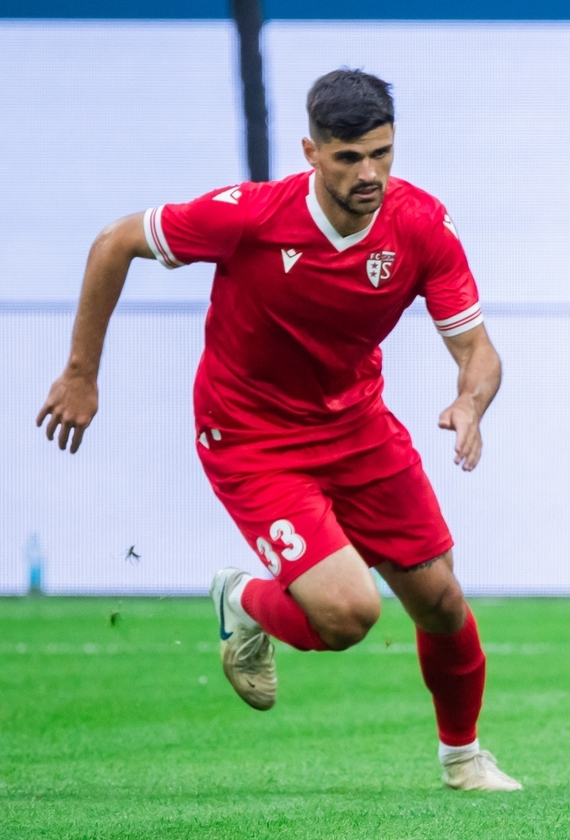
- Nivokazi with Sion in 2025

Personal information
- Date of birth: 26 January 2000 (age 26)
- Place of birth: Perugia, Italy
- Height: 1.88 m (6 ft 2 in)
- Position: Centre-forward

Team information
- Current team: Sion
- Number: 33

Youth career
- 2008–2011: Collepieve
- 2011: Grifoponte
- 2011–2013: Bastia
- 2013–2014: Monte Malbe
- 2014–2019: Atalanta
- 2019: → Bologna (loan)

Senior career*
Years	Team	Apps	(Gls)
2019–2021	Atalanta	0	(0)
2019–2020	→ Lecco (loan)	1	(0)
2021	Foggia	7	(0)
2021–2023	Chiasso	39	(14)
2023	Rapperswil-Jona	17	(5)
2023–2024	Lugano II	27	(14)
2024–2025	Bellinzona	34	(18)
2025–	Sion	46	(15)

International career^{‡}
2016	Italy U16	1	(0)
2016	Italy U17	4	(0)
2017	Italy U18	5	(2)
2021	Kosovo U21	3	(0)
2026–	Kosovo	1	(0)
- * Club domestic league appearances and goals as of 28 September 2026 ‡ National team caps and goals as of 15:52, 31 May 2026 (UTC)

Rilind Nivokazi (born 26 January 2000) is a professional footballer who plays as a centre-forward for Swiss Super League club Sion. Born in Italy, he plays for the Kosovo national team.

== Club career ==
=== Early career and Atalanta ===
Nivokazi at the age of 8, he started playing football in Collepieve, he besides being was part of Collepieve, he was part even of Grifoponte (2011), Bastia (2011–2013) and Monte Malbe (2013–2014). On 23 May 2014, Nivokazi joined with youth team of Italian giants Atalanta. In 2017–18 season, he started playing for Atalanta's under-19 squad.

==== Loan at Bologna Youth Sector ====
On 18 January 2019, Nivokazi joined Campionato Primavera 2 club Bologna, on a six-month-long loan. One day later, he made his debut in a 2–3 away win against SPAL after coming on as a substitute at 57th minute in place of Kaloyan Krastev. On 16 February 2019, he scored his first goal for Bologna in his fifth appearance for the club in a 2–2 away draw over Hellas Verona in Campionato Primavera 2.

==== Loan at Lecco ====
On 10 July 2019, Nivokazi joined newly-promoted Serie C club Lecco, on a season-long loan. On 25 August 2019, he was named as a Lecco substitute for the first time in a league match against Arezzo. His debut with Lecco came thirteen days later in a league match against Novara after coming on as a substitute at 76th minute in place of Marco Moleri.

=== Foggia ===
On 1 February 2021, Nivokazi joined Serie C side Foggia and receiving squad number 30. Twelve days later, he made his debut in a 0–2 home defeat against Catanzaro after coming on as a substitute at 81st minute in place of Ibourahima Baldé.

=== Chiasso ===
On 4 August 2021, he signed with Swiss club Chiasso.

=== Lugano ===
In December 2022, Nivokazi joined Rapperswil-Jona, before moving to FC Lugano in July 2023, where he was going to play for the clubs reserve team.

=== Bellinzona ===
On 30 July 2024, Nivokazi moved to Bellinzona.

== International career ==
From 2016, until 2017, Nivokazi has been part of Italy at youth international level, respectively has been part of the U16, U17 and U18 teams and he with these teams played ten matches and scored two goals. On 15 March 2021, Nivokazi received a call-up from Kosovo U21 for the friendly matches against Qatar U23. Eleven days later, he made his debut with Kosovo U21 in first match against Qatar U23 after being named in the starting line-up.

On 29 August 2025, Nivokazi received a call-up from Kosovo for the 2026 FIFA World Cup qualification matches against Switzerland and Sweden.

== Personal life ==
Nivokazi was born in Perugia, Italy to Kosovo Albanian parents from Gjakova.
