= Tim Staubli =

Swiss footballer (born 2000)

Personal information
- Full name: Tim Elia Staubli
- Date of birth: 16 April 2000 (age 26)
- Place of birth: Buchs, Switzerland
- Height: 1.79 m (5 ft 10 in)
- Position: Midfielder

Team information
- Current team: Wil
- Number: 17

Youth career
- 2009–2013: Buchs
- 2013–2014: Grabs
- 2014: Buchs
- 2014–2019: St. Gallen

Senior career*
Years	Team	Apps	(Gls)
2017–2021	St. Gallen II	56	(17)
2019–2022	St. Gallen	47	(1)
2022	→ Vaduz (loan)	8	(0)
2022–	Wil	116	(13)

International career^{‡}
2015–2016	Switzerland U16	7	(2)
2017	Switzerland U17	1	(0)
- * Club domestic league appearances and goals as of 30 September 2026 ‡ National team caps and goals as of 25 December 2019

Tim Elia Staubli (born 16 April 2000) is a Swiss professional footballer who plays as a midfielder for Wil.

== Professional career ==
On 24 May 2019, Staubli signed his first professional contract with St. Gallen. Staubli made his professional debut for St. Gallen in a 4–1 Swiss Super League win over Thun on 8 December 2019.

On 22 January 2022, Staubli joined Vaduz on loan until the end of the season, with an option to buy.

On 27 May 2022, Staubli signed a two-year contract with Wil.
