= FC Wil =

Swiss football club

- Full name: Fussball Club Wil 1900
- Nicknames: Die Schwarz-Weissen (The Black and Whites)
- Founded: 1900; 126 years ago
- Ground: Lidl Arena
- Capacity: 6,048
- Chairman: Maurice Weber
- Manager: Marco Hämmerli
- League: Swiss Challenge League
- 2024–25: Swiss Challenge League, 5th of 10
- Website: fcwil.ch
| Home colours | Away colours |

FC Wil (Fussball Club Wil 1900) is a football club based in Wil, Switzerland. They play in the Sportpark Bergholz, which has a total capacity of 6,048. The club has consistently played in the Swiss second tier since regaining promotion in 1992, aside from two seasons in the Nationalliga A between 2002 and 2004. They won the Swiss Cup in 2004 their only major honour.

The club considers its primary purpose to be a stepping stone for young players and work closely together with FC St. Gallen. It has contributed to the development of several players that currently play in the Super League, some of whom appeared in the Swiss national team, most notably Fabian Schär.

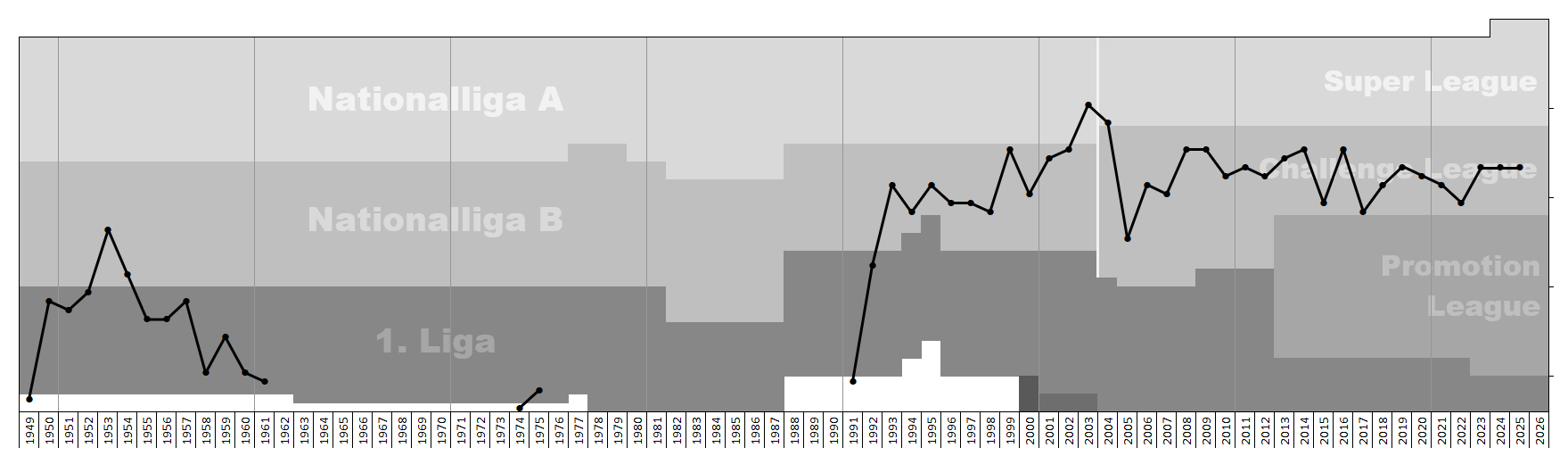
Chart of FC Wil table positions in the Swiss football league system

== History ==
=== Early years ===
FC Wil was formed in 1900 in the east of Switzerland by two workers from England. Initially, they were known as FC Stella. In 1902 the club was renamed as FC Fors, before taking their hometown's name in 1907.

After ceasing operations in World War I and a revival in 1920, the club achieved promotion to the second division in 1922 before being forced to withdraw from the competition due to losing most of their players. Thanks to a particularly talented youth team, which won the Swiss youth competition in 1937, the club was able to build a base for a new team. They soon achieved several promotions in 1943, 1945, 1949, and 1952 to reach the Nationalliga B, from where they were relegated in 1954 as their golden generation began to retire.

From there, the club spend several decades in the lower leagues until in 1988, where the club appointed Christian Gross as player manager. Gross managed the club between 1988 and 1993 and achieved two promotions to reach the NLB for the second time, before leaving for Grasshopper Club Zürich.

=== Promotion to Nationalliga A ===
In 2002 Wil were promoted to the top flight for the first time in history. They achieved a 4th place in their first season, earning themselves a place in the Intertoto Cup. The following season, they reached the third round in their European debut, losing to FC Nantes. A week after a record-breaking 11–3 win against local rivals FC St. Gallen, club president Andreas Hafen was discovered to have embezzled 51 million Swiss francs (US$40 million) from the UBS. He was given a jail term of five years. Approximately 10 million Swiss francs was discovered to have ended up at the club, whose repayment UBS waived as the other board members knew nothing of it.

After the Andreas Hafen saga, the club was taken over by Ukrainian footballer Igor Belanov and his time in charge of the club was marked by a frequent changes of coaches. FC Wil won the final of the Swiss Cup against Grasshopper Club Zürich while at the same time being relegated to the second division, under the management of Aleksandr Zavarov (who, lacking the necessary UEFA licence to be a coach, was officially given the position of director of football).

=== Recent history ===
In July 2015, FC Wil was taken over by Turkish investors MNG group. After an 18-month involvement with the team they abruptly pulled out in January 2017, leaving the club to its own devices. A task-force has formed as a result to save the club from bankruptcy, with the mission of significantly reducing the exorbitant expenses introduced by the investors.

Roger Bigger returned as president to stabilize the club, after having resigned with the arrival of the investors. However, he definitively stepped down in November 2017, having led the club since 2003. As a result, the club has elected a new board consisting of members based in the region. Contrary to the former investors' ambitions to play in the Europa League, it pledged to return to its roots as a team that focuses on developing and furthering the careers of younger players, settling securely in the Challenge League.

== Honours ==
- Swiss Cup
  - Champions (1): 2003–04

== Stadium ==
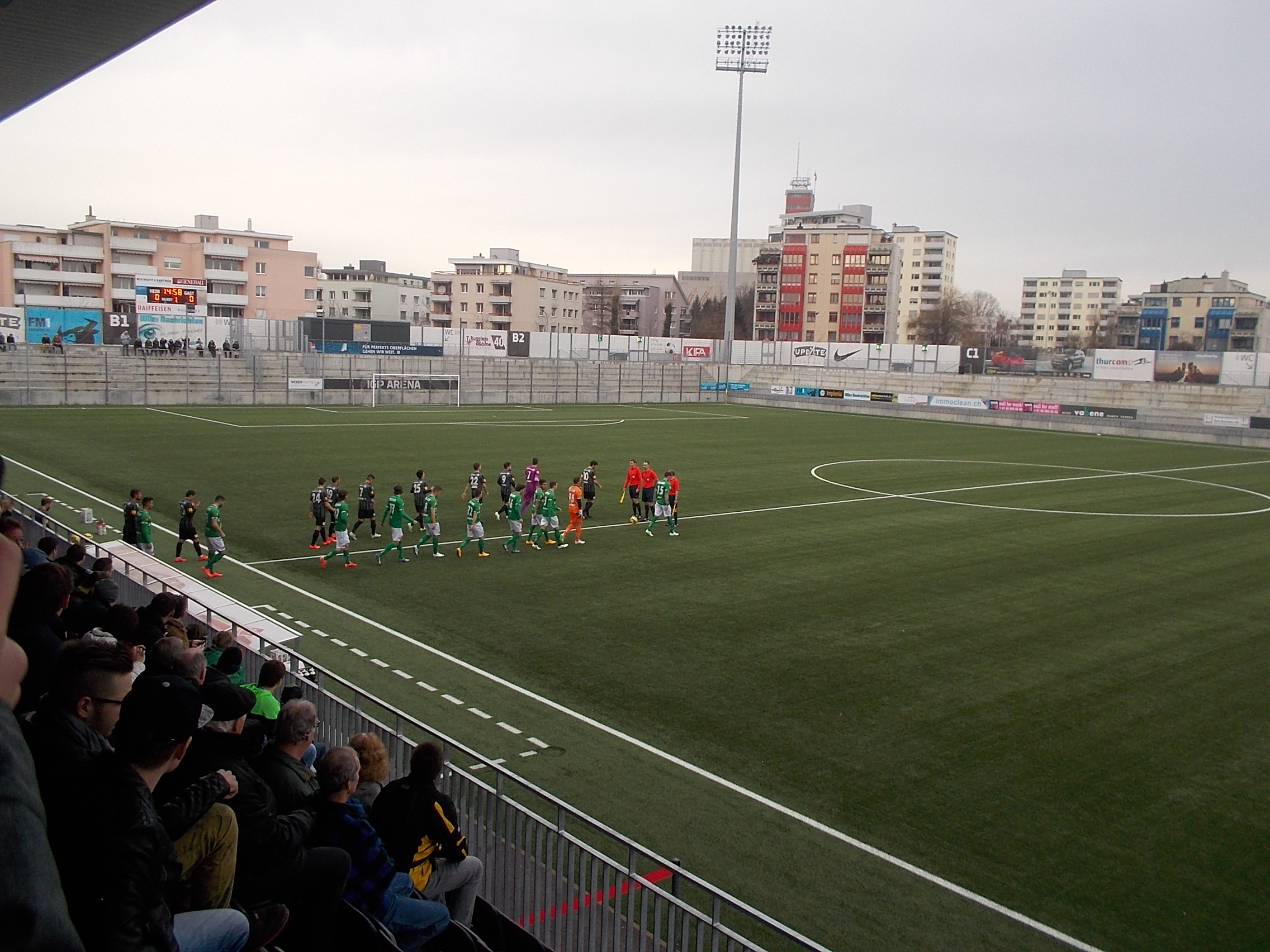
FC Wil play FC St. Gallen at their home ground

Wil play in the Lidl Arena with a total capacity of 6,000. The stadium contains 700 seats and 5,300 standing places.

It is part of the eponymous sports facility, which also contains swimming pools and an ice hockey rink, that was newly built at the site of their old ground in 2013, for the cost of around 11 million Swiss francs. Between 2013 and 2020 it bore the name of its sponsor IGP Pulvertechnik, before reverting to its initial name.

== Players ==
=== Current squad ===
As of 3 September 2026

Note: Flags indicate national team as defined under FIFA eligibility rules; some limited exceptions apply. Players may hold more than one non-FIFA nationality.

| No. | Pos. | Nation | Player |
|---|---|---|---|
| 1 | GK | SUI | Gentrit Muslija (on loan from St. Gallen) |
| 2 | DF | SUI | Uchenna Nwannah |
| 3 | DF | SUI | Janik Rutz |
| 4 | DF | SUI | David Jacovic |
| 5 | DF | KOS | Julind Selmonaj |
| 7 | MF | SUI | Patrick Weber |
| 8 | MF | SUI | Orges Bunjaku |
| 9 | FW | MLI | Mahamadou Diarra |
| 10 | MF | SUI | Noah Rupp |
| 11 | FW | SUI | Benjamin Keita |
| 13 | MF | CHA | Djawal Kaiba |
| 14 | FW | SUI | Luuk Breedijk |
| 15 | DF | SUI | Yannick Schmid |
| 16 | GK | SUI | Janis Keller |

| No. | Pos. | Nation | Player |
|---|---|---|---|
| 17 | MF | SUI | Tim Staubli |
| 18 | FW | SUI | Pirosch Fischer |
| 19 | DF | SUI | Loris Schreiber |
| 20 | MF | SUI | Agon Rexhaj |
| 21 | DF | SUI | Patrick Sutter |
| 22 | MF | KOS | Edis Bytyqi |
| 23 | DF | SUI | Isaiah Okafor |
| 25 | FW | KOS | Xhan Aliu |
| 26 | DF | CAF | Noah Ato-Zandanga |
| 28 | DF | SUI | Tarik Seferovic (on loan from St. Gallen) |
| 29 | GK | SUI | Janis Widmer |
| 30 | MF | SUI | Sergio Correia |
| 33 | FW | SUI | Yves Allou |

=== Out on loan ===
Note: Flags indicate national team as defined under FIFA eligibility rules; some limited exceptions apply. Players may hold more than one non-FIFA nationality.

| No. | Pos. | Nation | Player |
|---|---|---|---|
| — | MF | GER | Simon Tisch-Rottensteiner (at Kreuzlingen until 31 December 2026) |

== Coaching & Medical staff ==
| Position | Staff |
|---|---|
| Manager | (Switzerland) Marco Hämmerli |
| Assistant Manager | (Switzerland) Jannik Schulz |
| Goalkeeping Coach | (Switzerland) Philipp Bowald |
| Fitness Coach | (Switzerland) René Waldvogel |
| Team Doctor | (Switzerland) Gernot Schneider |
| Team Doctor | (Switzerland) Philipp Zwyssig |
| Physiotherapist | (Switzerland) Selim Kaya |
| Physiotherapist | (Switzerland) Manuel Härtel |
| Masseur | (Switzerland) Tobias Baumgartner |
| Masseur | (Switzerland) Uwe Göppel |
| Team Manager | (Switzerland) Ernst Schuster |

== European Cup History ==
| Season | Competition | Round | Country | Club | Home | Away | Aggregate |
|---|---|---|---|---|---|---|---|
| 2004–05 | UEFA Cup | Q2 | (Slovakia) | Dukla Banská Bystrica | 1–3 | 1–1 | 2–4 |
