= List of Swiss football transfers summer 2026 =

This is a list of Swiss football transfers for the 2026 summer transfer window. Only transfers featuring Swiss Super League are listed.

== Swiss Super League ==
Note: Flags indicate national team as has been defined under FIFA eligibility rules. Players may hold more than one non-FIFA nationality.

=== Thun ===
In:

No.	Pos.	Nation	Player
2	DF	SUI	Olivier Mambwa (on loan from Young Boys)
5	DF	SUI	Nicolas Bürgy (from (Denmark) OB)
8	MF	SUI	Fabio Saiz (from Yverdon-Sport)
13	MF	SUI	Nassim Zoukit (from Aarau)
15	MF	EST	Patrik Kristal (on loan from (Germany) 1. FC Köln II)
18	MF	SWE	Tom Strannegård (from (Norway) Start)
20	FW	ITA	Riccardo Braschi (from (Italy) Fiorentina)
21	MF	SUI	Dorian Derbaci (from Aarau)
24	DF	SUI	Mats Seiler (from Young Boys)
26	FW	SWE	Noah Christoffersson (from (Sweden) Örgryte)
30	MF	SUI	Nico Maier (from (Austria) Blau-Weiß Linz)
54	DF	SUI	Louis Passavant (from Basel U21)

Out:

No.	Pos.	Nation	Player
1	GK	SUI	Nino Ziswiler (retired)
5	DF	GER	Dominik Franke (to (Lithuania) Žalgiris)
6	MF	SUI	Leonardo Bertone (to Luzern)
7	MF	SUI	Kastriot Imeri (loan return to Young Boys)
8	MF	SUI	Vasilije Janjičić (free agent)
18	FW	CGO	Christopher Ibayi (to (Morocco) MAS)
20	MF	SUI	Noah Rupp (loan return to (Germany) Karlsruher SC)
27	DF	SUI	Michael Heule (to (Germany) 1. FC Heidenheim)
30	GK	SUI	Jan Eicher (free agent)
74	FW	MKD	Elmin Rastoder (to (Greece) Panathinaikos)
77	MF	SUI	Ethan Meichtry (to (Italy) Genoa)
78	MF	KOS	Valmir Matoshi (to (Austria) Sturm Graz)
—	MF	ALB	Enis Asani (to Biel-Bienne, previously on loan)
—	MF	URU	Mathías Tomás (to (Mexico) Puebla, previously on loan at (Cyprus) APOEL)
—	FW	ENG	Layton Stewart (free agent, previously on loan at (England) AFC Wimbledon)

=== St. Gallen ===
In:

No.	Pos.	Nation	Player
9	FW	SUI	Andrin Hunziker (from Basel, previously on loan at Winterthur)
14	FW	GUI	Aliou Baldé (from (France) Nice, previously on loan)
20	MF	KOS	Leon Frokaj (from Aarau)

Out:

No.	Pos.	Nation	Player
8	MF	ESP	Jordi Quintillà (on loan to (Cyprus) Nea Salamis Famagusta)
18	FW	SUI	Alessandro Vogt (to (Germany) TSG Hoffenheim)
19	FW	CRO	Antonio Verinac (on loan to Austria Lustenau)
77	FW	SUI	Tiemoko Ouattara (loan return to Servette)
—	DF	SUI	Konrad Faber (to (Germany) VfL Osnabrück, previously on loan at (Germany) Dynamo Dresden)
—	MF	SUI	Edis Bytyqi (to Wil, previously on loan)

=== Lugano ===
In:

No.	Pos.	Nation	Player
2	DF	UZB	Bekhruz Karimov (from (Uzbekistan) Surkhon)
9	FW	SUI	Albian Ajeti (on loan from Basel)
16	GK	SUI	David von Ballmoos (from Young Boys, previously on loan)
18	DF	SUI	Joel Bichsel (from (Germany) 1. FC Saarbrücken)
22	FW	COL	Beckham Castro (from (Colombia) Millonarios)
28	GK	GER	Felix Gebhardt (from (Germany) Jahn Regensburg)
30	FW	HON	Dereck Moncada (from (Colombia) Inter Bogotá)

Out:

No.	Pos.	Nation	Player
1	GK	KOS	Amir Saipi (to (Spain) Castellón)
2	DF	CAN	Zachary Brault-Guillard (free agent)
9	FW	GRE	Georgios Koutsias (to (Portugal) Famalicão)
10	MF	SUI	Mattia Bottani (to Collina d'Oro)
13	GK	SUI	Šerif Berbić (free agent)
18	MF	FRA	Hicham Mahou (free agent)
29	MF	TUN	Hadj Mahmoud (to (Tunisia) Espérance de Tunis)
47	DF	SUI	Yassin Sbai (to (Serbia) Železničar Pančevo)
49	MF	MKD	Ilija Maslarov (on loan to Rapperswil-Jona)
—	FW	KOS	Shkelqim Vladi (to Aarau, previously on loan)
—	GK	GRE	Fotis Pseftis (on loan to (Turkey) Antalyaspor, previously on loan at (Germany) Alemannia Aachen)
—	FW	MTQ	Alexandre Parsemain (to (Portugal) Moreirense, previously on loan at (France) Caen)

=== Sion ===
In:

No.	Pos.	Nation	Player
13	FW	SUI	Winsley Boteli (from (Germany) Borussia Mönchengladbach II, previously on loan)
37	MF	FRA	Fodé Sylla (from (France) Lens)
55	DF	ITA	Lorenzo Villa (from (Italy) Juventus Next Gen, previously on loan at (Italy) Padova)
—	FW	CRO	Ivano Srdoč (from (Italy) Juventus Next Gen, previously on loan at (Bosnia and Herzegovina) Široki Brijeg)

Out:

No.	Pos.	Nation	Player
24	DF	SUI	Maxime Dubosson (on loan to Étoile Carouge)
25	MF	SEN	Lamine Diack (loan return to (France) Nantes)
—	DF	SUI	Noah Grognuz (reloan to Stade Nyonnais)
—	MF	ALB	Burak Alili (reloan to Stade Nyonnais)
—	DF	SUI	Gilles Richard (on loan to Yverdon-Sport, previously on loan at Stade Nyonnais)
—	MF	SUI	Pierrick Moulin (on loan to Stade Nyonnais, previously on loan at Bellinzona)
—	FW	SUI	Dejan Djokić (to Vaduz, previously on loan at (Hungary) Debrecen)
—	FW	POR	Dinis Rodrigues (to (Italy) Napoli, previously on loan at (Portugal) Penafiel)

=== Basel ===
In:

No.	Pos.	Nation	Player
1	GK	SUI	Jonas Omlin (from (Germany) Borussia Mönchengladbach, previously on loan at (Germany) Bayer Leverkusen)
8	MF	SWE	Ludwig Małachowski Thorell (from (Sweden) Mjällby)
9	FW	SLO	Žan Celar (from (England) Queens Park Rangers, previously on loan at (Germany) Fortuna Düsseldorf)
11	FW	BEL	Kazeem Olaigbe (on loan from (Turkey) Trabzonspor, previously on loan at (Turkey) Konyaspor)
17	FW	FRA	Aaron Malouda (from (Azerbaijan) Sabah)
18	MF	SEN	Asane Sow (from (Italy) Pro Vercelli)
22	DF	FRA	Clément Michelin (from (Spain) Real Valladolid)
25	DF	FRA	Coleen Louis (from (France) Amiens)
44	MF	ITA	Jonas Harder (from (Italy) Fiorentina, previously on loan at (Italy) Padova)
55	DF	NGR	Akpe Victory (from (Hungary) Zalaegerszeg)

Out:

No.	Pos.	Nation	Player
1	GK	SUI	Marwin Hitz (retired)
8	MF	FRA	Koba Koindredi (loan return to (Portugal) Sporting CP)
11	FW	CIV	Bénie Traoré (to (United States) New York City)
17	FW	GER	Moritz Broschinski (on loan to (Germany) Karlsruher SC)
18	FW	BEL	Julien Duranville (loan return to (Germany) Borussia Dortmund)
19	FW	CRO	Marin Šotiček (on loan to (Croatia) Hajduk Split)
21	FW	MAR	Ibrahim Salah (on loan to (Belgium) Royal Antwerp)
22	MF	FRA	Léo Leroy (to (England) Preston North End)
23	FW	SUI	Albian Ajeti (on loan to Lugano)
25	DF	NED	Finn van Breemen (to (Portugal) Famalicão)
28	MF	SUI	Dion Kacuri (on loan to Austria Lustenau)
31	DF	SUI	Dominik Schmid (to (Austria) Red Bull Salzburg)
40	FW	SUI	Agon Rexhaj (to Wil)
42	DF	FRA	Evann Senaya (on loan to Rapperswil-Jona)
43	DF	SUI	Marvin Akahomen (on loan to Kriens)
47	GK	GER	Tim Pfeiffer (to (Germany) Borussia Mönchengladbach II)
—	DF	BIH	Adrian Leon Barišić (to (Portugal) Braga, previously on loan)
—	FW	SUI	Andrin Hunziker (to St. Gallen, previously on loan at Winterthur)
—	FW	SRB	Đorđe Jovanović (to (Serbia) Čukarički, previously on loan at (Israel) Maccabi Haifa)
—	FW	SUI	Arlet Junior Zé (to (Germany) Eintracht Braunschweig, previously on loan at (Denmark) Midtjylland)

=== Young Boys ===
In:

No.	Pos.	Nation	Player
4	DF	GER	Moritz Jenz (from (Germany) VfL Wolfsburg)
9	FW	SEN	Kaly Sène (from (England) Middlesbrough)
12	MF	FRA	Herba Guirassy (from (France) Nantes)
13	MF	CZE	Dominik Pech (from (Czech Republic) Slavia Prague, previously on loan)
15	DF	SUI	Cédric Zesiger (from (Germany) FC Augsburg)
18	GK	CYP	Joël Mall (from Servette)
22	DF	SUI	Isaac Schmidt (from (England) Leeds United, previously on loan at (Germany) Werder Bremen)

Out:

No.	Pos.	Nation	Player
3	DF	ALG	Jaouen Hadjam (to (England) Brighton & Hove Albion)
4	DF	FRA	Tanguy Zoukrou (on loan to (Turkey) Kocaelispor)
11	MF	GAM	Ebrima Colley (on loan to (Turkey) Konyaspor)
12	GK	AUT	Heinz Lindner (to Zürich)
18	GK	KOS	Ardian Bajrami (free agent)
22	DF	TUN	Yan Valery (loan return to (England) Sheffield Wednesday)
29	FW	CIV	Chris Bedia (loan return to (Germany) Union Berlin)
36	FW	SUI	Darian Maleš (to (Poland) Widzew Łódź)
45	MF	MAD	Rayan Raveloson (to (Turkey) Amedspor)
55	DF	SUI	Mats Seiler (to Thun)
57	DF	SUI	Olivier Mambwa (on loan to Thun)
60	GK	SUI	Ruben Salchli (on loan to Kriens)
77	FW	SUI	Joël Monteiro (to (Italy) Lecce)
—	DF	SUI	Rhodri Smith (on loan to (Czech Republic) Baník Ostrava, previously on loan at Winterthur)
—	MF	SUI	Lutfi Dalipi (on loan to Vaduz, previously on loan at Wil)
—	FW	SUI	Janis Lüthi (on loan to Neuchâtel Xamax, previously on loan at Rapperswil-Jona)
—	FW	VEN	Sergio Córdova (on loan to (Turkey) Batman Petrolspor, previously on loan at (United States) St. Louis City)
—	GK	SUI	David von Ballmoos (to Lugano, previously on loan)
—	MF	POL	Łukasz Łakomy (to (Belgium) OH Leuven, previously on loan)
—	MF	SUI	Kastriot Imeri (to (Germany) Union Berlin, previously on loan at Thun)
—	MF	SUI	Malik Deme (to Rapperswil-Jona, previously on loan at Neuchâtel Xamax)
—	FW	SUI	Emmanuel Tsimba (to (Belgium) Westerlo, previously on loan at Grasshoppers)

=== Luzern ===
In:

No.	Pos.	Nation	Player
1	GK	ALB	Simon Simoni (from (Germany) Eintracht Frankfurt, previously on loan at (Germany) 1. FC Kaiserslautern)
6	MF	SUI	Leonardo Bertone (from Thun)
7	FW	NED	Aurelio Oehlers (from (Netherlands) Volendam)
16	FW	COD	Oscar Kabwit (from (Democratic Republic of the Congo) TP Mazembe, previously on loan)
18	FW	COD	Faveurdi Bongeli (on loan from (Democratic Republic of the Congo) TP Mazembe)
19	FW	POL	Daniel Mikołajewski (on loan from (Italy) Parma)
21	DF	SUI	Loïc Lüthi (from Winterthur)
25	GK	SUI	Tim Hottiger (from Lausanne-Sport, previously on loan at Neuchâtel Xamax)
30	GK	CRO	Karlo Letica (from Lausanne-Sport)
63	GK	SUI	Raphael Radtke (from Schaffhausen)

Out:

No.	Pos.	Nation	Player
1	GK	SUI	Pascal Loretz (to (Germany) Hannover 96)
2	DF	SUI	Severin Ottiger (to Winterthur)
3	DF	SWE	Jesper Löfgren (on loan to (Sweden) Kalmar)
4	DF	SUI	Adrian Bajrami (to (Portugal) Braga)
6	MF	JPN	Taisei Abe (loan return to (Japan) V-Varen Nagasaki)
7	MF	SUI	Kevin Spadanuda (to Zürich)
10	FW	GER	Sinan Karweina (to (Germany) Wehen Wiesbaden)
19	FW	SUI	Andrej Vasovic (to (Belgium) Club Brugge)
23	GK	SUI	Lionel Huwiler (on loan to Étoile Carouge)
28	MF	SUI	Ronaldo Dantas Fernandes (on loan to Stade Lausanne Ouchy)
41	GK	GER	Julian Bock (to (Germany) VfB Stuttgart II)
42	DF	MEX	Mauricio Willimann (to Kriens)
81	FW	SUI	Julian von Moos (loan return to Servette)
90	GK	SRB	Vaso Vasić (free agent)
—	MF	SUI	Mattia Walker (on loan to Vaduz, previously on loan at Étoile Carouge)
—	FW	SUI	Luuk Breedijk (to Wil, previously on loan)

=== Servette ===
In:

No.	Pos.	Nation	Player
1	GK	LTU	Edvinas Gertmonas (from (Romania) Universitatea Cluj)
6	MF	BRA	Pedro Naressi (from (Bulgaria) Ludogorets Razgrad)
7	FW	ZAM	Kingstone Mutandwa (on loan from (Italy) Cagliari, previously on loan at (Austria) SV Ried)
10	FW	FRA	Junior Kadile (from (Netherlands) Almere City, previously on loan)
21	FW	SWE	Jesper Karlsson (on loan from (Italy) Bologna, previously on loan at (Netherlands) Utrecht)
22	FW	FRA	Mathis Lambourde (from (Italy) Hellas Verona, previously on loan at (Italy) Reggiana)
23	DF	SUI	Quentin Maceiras (from (Hungary) Puskás Akadémia)
27	FW	CIV	David Datro Fofana (from (England) Chelsea, previously on loan at (France) Strasbourg)

Out:

No.	Pos.	Nation	Player
1	GK	CYP	Joël Mall (to Young Boys)
2	DF	SUI	Loun Srdanović (to (France) Lille)
5	MF	CMR	Gaël Ondoua (free agent)
7	MF	SUI	Giotto Morandi (to Grasshoppers)
10	FW	FRA	Junior Kadile (on loan to (France) Lens)
21	FW	SUI	Jérémy Guillemenot (to (Poland) Wisła Kraków)
38	MF	SUI	Malek Ishuayed (on loan to Kriens)
39	FW	SUI	Mardochée Miguel (on loan to Stade Nyonnais)
45	FW	SUI	Jamie Atangana (on loan to Stade Lausanne Ouchy)
97	FW	FRA	Florian Ayé (to (Turkey) Kocaelispor)
—	DF	ALB	Leart Zuka (on loan to Étoile Carouge, previously on loan at Grand-Saconnex)
—	FW	POR	Keyan Varela (on loan to (Netherlands) RKC Waalwijk, previously on loan at (Germany) Greuther Fürth)
—	MF	SUI	Patrick Weber (to Wil, previously on loan at Yverdon-Sport)
—	MF	CIV	Sidiki Camara (to Étoile Carouge, previously on loan at Yverdon-Sport)
—	FW	SUI	Julian von Moos (to Grasshoppers, previously on loan at Luzern)

=== Lausanne-Sport ===
In:

No.	Pos.	Nation	Player
3	DF	ENG	Tyler Fredricson (from (England) Manchester United)
4	DF	FRA	Étienne Youté Kinkoué (from (France) Le Havre)
9	FW	FRA	Enzo Molebe (on loan from (France) Lyon, previously on loan at (France) Montpellier)
22	DF	FRA	Thomas Cordier (from (France) Paris Saint-Germain U23)
31	DF	FRA	Nicolas Cozza (from (Germany) VfL Wolfsburg, previously on loan at (France) Nantes)
77	FW	CIV	Levy Nene (on loan from (Denmark) Nordsjælland)
88	MF	FRA	Koba Koindredi (from (Portugal) Sporting CP, previously on loan at Basel)

Out:

No.	Pos.	Nation	Player
8	MF	SWE	Jamie Roche (to (Belgium) Kortrijk)
9	FW	CAN	Theo Bair (loan return to (France) Auxerre)
14	DF	CGO	Kévin Mouanga (to (Turkey) Kasımpaşa)
19	MF	SUI	Ethan Bruchez (on loan to Yverdon-Sport)
22	FW	FRA	Enzo Kana-Biyik (loan return to (England) Manchester United)
25	GK	CRO	Karlo Letica (to Luzern)
38	MF	GEO	Gabriel Sigua (loan return to Basel)
49	FW	SUI	Ilija Despotovic (to (France) Red Star)
70	FW	MLI	Gaoussou Diakité (loan return to (Austria) Red Bull Salzburg)
93	DF	CIV	Sékou Fofana (to (France) Auxerre)
—	GK	SUI	Tim Hottiger (to Luzern, previously on loan at Neuchâtel Xamax)
—	MF	SUI	Mayka Okuka (to Yverdon-Sport, previously on loan at Stade Nyonnais)
—	FW	USA	Konrad de la Fuente (to (Spain) Sporting Gijón, previously on loan at (Spain) Ceuta)

=== Zürich ===
In:

No.	Pos.	Nation	Player
13	GK	AUT	Heinz Lindner (from Young Boys)
17	MF	SUI	Kevin Spadanuda (from Luzern)

Out:

No.	Pos.	Nation	Player
6	MF	SUI	Cheveyo Tsawa (to (Belgium) Club Brugge)
8	FW	ANG	Ivan Cavaleiro (to (Angola) Petro de Luanda)
9	FW	COL	Juan José Perea (to (Greece) Atromitos)
10	FW	GLP	Matthias Phaëton (loan return to (Bulgaria) CSKA Sofia)
15	MF	COL	Nelson Palacio (loan return to (United States) Real Salt Lake)
25	GK	SUI	Yanick Brecher (retired)
35	DF	CRO	David Vujević (to (Italy) Carrarese)
—	DF	SUI	Mattia Rizzo (to (Italy) Lecco, previously on loan)
—	DF	SUI	Daniel Denoon (to (Italy) Pisa, previously on loan)

=== Grasshoppers ===
In:

No.	Pos.	Nation	Player
1	GK	SUI	Marvin Hübel (from Aarau)
11	MF	SUI	Giotto Morandi (from Servette)
20	FW	ITA	Diego Ferrazza (from (Italy) Spezia U19)
24	MF	NED	Kenzo Goudmijn (on loan from (England) Derby County, previously on loan at (Netherlands) Go Ahead Eagles)
25	DF	USA	John Hilton (from (Netherlands) Dordrecht)
44	DF	ALB	Bujar Pllana (from (Poland) Lechia Gdańsk)
66	MF	ESP	Manex Guibelalde (from (Spain) Bilbao Athletic)
81	FW	SUI	Julian von Moos (from Servette, previously on loan at Luzern)

Out:

No.	Pos.	Nation	Player
1	GK	SUI	Nicolas Glaus (to (Germany) Rot-Weiß Oberhausen)
2	DF	NED	Dirk Abels (to (Vietnam) Cong An Ho Chi Minh City)
3	DF	SUI	Saulo Decarli (retired)
10	MF	DEN	Jonathan Asp Jensen (loan return to (Germany) Bayern Munich II)
11	MF	CIV	Salifou Diarrassouba (on loan to Rapperswil-Jona)
14	MF	CRO	Lovro Zvonarek (loan return to (Germany) Bayern Munich)
19	FW	SUI	Emmanuel Tsimba (loan return to Young Boys)
20	DF	SEN	El Bachir Ngom (to (Belgium) Gent)
21	MF	SUI	Leart Kabashi (to (Scotland) Heart of Midlothian)
27	MF	GER	Sven Köhler (to (Cyprus) AEK Larnaca)
30	DF	KOS	Ismajl Beka (on loan to Rapperswil-Jona)
50	GK	KOS	Laurent Seji (to Stade Lausanne Ouchy)
99	FW	SUI	Michael Frey (to (Belgium) Royal Antwerp)
—	DF	SUI	Loris Giandomenico (on loan to (Germany) Greuther Fürth, previously on loan at Rapperswil-Jona)
—	FW	GAM	Alieu Conateh (on loan to Austria Lustenau, previously on loan at SKU Amstetten)
—	DF	KOS	Florian Hoxha (to Étoile Carouge, previously on loan)

=== Vaduz ===
In:

No.	Pos.	Nation	Player
10	MF	URU	Juan Ignacio Cabrera (from (Germany) Greuther Fürth)
11	MF	SUI	Lutfi Dalipi (on loan from Young Boys, previously on loan at Wil)
16	FW	SUI	Ranjan Neelakandan (on loan from (France) Annecy, previously on loan at Yverdon-Sport)
17	MF	GER	Julian Stark (from (Germany) SC Verl)
18	FW	GER	Daniel Kasper (from (Belgium) Eupen)
19	FW	SUI	Dejan Djokić (from Sion, previously on loan at (Hungary) Debrecen)
24	FW	MDA	Lado Akhalaia (from (Germany) Greuther Fürth II)
30	MF	SUI	Mattia Walker (on loan from Luzern, previously on loan at Étoile Carouge)
39	FW	SRB	Dejan Sorgić (from Yverdon-Sport)

Out:

No.	Pos.	Nation	Player
11	FW	ESP	Javi Navarro (to (Cyprus) Enosis Neon Paralimni)
12	FW	CAN	Ayo Akinola (to Stade Lausanne Ouchy)
15	FW	FRA	Brian Beyer (loan return to Winterthur)
16	MF	SUI	Gabriele De Donno (to AC Taverne)
17	FW	POR	Angelo Campos (to Schaffhausen)
18	MF	LIE	Alessio Hasler (to (Germany) FV Illertissen)
24	MF	SUI	Cédric Gasser (free agent)
29	FW	SUI	Jonathan De Donno (to Neuchâtel Xamax)
30	MF	SUI	Ronaldo Dantas Fernandes (loan return to Luzern U21)
—	GK	LIE	Gabriel Foser (to (Liechtenstein) Eschen/Mauren, previously on loan)

== See also ==
- 2026–27 Swiss Super League
