= 2024–25 FC Lausanne-Sport season =

FC Lausanne-Sport
2024–25 season
- Manager: Ludovic Magnin
- Stadium: Stade de la Tuilière
- Swiss Super League: 9th
- Swiss Cup: Pre-season
- Highest home attendance: 6,850 vs Basel
- All statistics correct as of 21 July 2024.

The 2024–25 season is the 129th season in the history of FC Lausanne-Sport, and the club's second consecutive season in the Swiss Super League. In addition to the domestic league, the team is scheduled to participate in the Swiss Cup.

== Transfers ==
=== In ===
Pos.	Player	Transferred from	Fee	Date	Source
FW	(Kosovo) Alban Ajdini	(Switzerland) Stade Lausanne Ouchy	Undisclosed	1 July 2024	
FW	(United States) Konrad de la Fuente	(France) Olympique de Marseille	Undisclosed	24 July 2024	

=== Out ===
Pos.	Player	Transferred to	Fee	Date	Source
MF	(Switzerland) Mayka Okuka	(Switzerland) FC Stade Lausanne Ouchy	Loan	8 July 2024	
FW	(Martinique) Brighton Labeau	(France) En Avant Guingamp	Undisclosed	26 July 2024	

== Friendlies ==
=== Pre-season ===
10 July 2024 Friendly	Nice (France)	2–2	(Switzerland) Lausanne-Sport	Nice
10:30	Cho 23'; Guessand 65'		Diabaté 68'; Szalai 87'	Stadium: Stade de la Plaine du Var; Attendance: 0

== Competitions ==
=== Overall record ===
Competition	First match	Last match	Starting round	Record							
Competition	First match	Last match	Starting round	Pld	W	D	L	GF	GA	GD	Win %
Swiss Super League	21 July 2024	22–24 May 2025	Matchday 1	3	1	0	2	6	10	−4	33.33
Swiss Cup	18 August 2024			0	0	0	0	0	0	+0	—
Total				3	1	0	2	6	10	−4	33.33

Last updated: 4 August 2024
Source: Soccerway

=== Swiss Super League ===
==== League table ====
Pos	Team	Pld	W	D	L	GF	GA	GD	Pts	Qualification or relegation (Note: Teams play each other three times (33 matches), before the league is split into two groups (the top six and the bottom six).)
3	Young Boys	38	17	10	11	60	49	+11	61	Qualification for the Europa League play-off round (Note: The 2024–25 Swiss Cup winner (Basel) qualifies for the Europa League play-off round. Since the cup winner finished in the top three, the remaining European berths were passed down to the next highest qualifying teams.)
4	Lugano	38	15	9	14	55	58	−3	54	Qualification for the Europa League second qualifying round
5	Lausanne-Sport	38	14	11	13	62	54	+8	53	Qualification for the Conference League second qualifying round
6	Luzern	38	14	10	14	66	64	+2	52	
7	Zürich	38	15	8	15	56	57	−1	53	

Source: Swiss Super League
Rules for classification: 1) Points; 2) Goal difference; 3) Goals scored; 4) Head-to-head goal difference; 5) Head-to-head goals scored 6) Away goals scored; 7) Draw.

==== Results summary ====
Overall								Home						Away					
Pld	W	D	L	GF	GA	GD	Pts	W	D	L	GF	GA	GD	W	D	L	GF	GA	GD
3	1	0	2	6	10	−4	3	1	0	1	6	6	0	0	0	1	0	4	−4

Last updated: 4 August 2024.

==== Results by round ====
Round	1	2	3
Ground	H	A	H
Result	W	L	L
Position	2		

Updated to match(es) played on 4 August 2024. Source:
A = Away; H = Home; W = Win; D = Draw; L = Loss

==== Matches ====
The match schedule was released on 18 June 2024.

21 July 2024 1	Lausanne-Sport	3–2	Basel	Lausanne
16:30	Okou 2'; Diabaté 22'; Sène 44'; Bernède (yellow card) 49'; Sanches (yellow card) 51'; Mouanga (yellow card) 57'; Abdallah (yellow card) 86'		Beney (yellow card) 17'; Comas (yellow card) 34'; Kade (yellow card) 35'; Barry 43', 87' (pen.); Barišić (yellow card) 63'	Stadium: Stade de la Tuilière; Attendance: 6,850; Referee: Anojen Kanagasingam

27 July 2024 2	Sion	4–0	Lausanne-Sport	Sion
18:00	Berdayes 7'; Kabacalman 10' (pen.); Souza 83'; Lavanchy 90'			Stadium: Stade de Tourbillon; Attendance: 10,200; Referee: Sven Wolfensberger

3 August 2024 3	Lausanne-Sport	3–4	St. Gallen	Lausanne
14:15	Okoroji 37' (o.g.); Dussenne 77'; Diabaté 80'		Schmidt 1'; Geubbels 20' (pen.); Akolo 50'; Cissé 70'	Stadium: Stade de la Tuilière; Attendance: 6,024; Referee: Nico Gianforte

11 August 2024 4	Zürich	2–0	Lausanne-Sport	Zürich
16:30	Emmanuel (yellow card) 31'; Leidner (yellow card) 35'; Fofana 39' (o.g.); Tsawa (yellow card) 53'; Gómez (yellow card) 61'; Perea (yellow card) 90+5'; Sabobo 90+7'; Moniz 90+8'	Report	Dussenne (yellow card) 28'; Magnin (yellow card) 70'	Stadium: Stadion Letzigrund; Attendance: 10,241; Referee: (Switzerland) Stefan Horisberger

31 August 2024 6	Young Boys	1–1	Lausanne-Sport	Bern
20:30	Lauper (yellow card) 42'; Ugrinić 45+3'; Colley (yellow card) 57'; Hadjam (yellow card) 58'; Zoukrou (red card) 75'	Report	Sène (yellow card) 45+3'; Sow 70'	Stadium: Stadion Wankdorf; Attendance: 28,079; Referee: (Switzerland) Alessandro Dudic

18 September 2024 5	Lausanne-Sport	1–2	Lugano	Lausanne
19:30	Okou (yellow card) 43'; Dussenne (yellow card) 45'; Diabaté 90+2'	Report	Poaty 39' (o.g.); Zanotti (yellow card) 45+1'; Doumbia (yellow card) 48'; Mai (yellow card) 56'; Hajdari (yellow card) 65'; Aliseda 77'	Stadium: Stade de la Tuilière; Attendance: 3,462; Referee: (Switzerland) Johannes von Mandach

22 September 2024 7	Lausanne-Sport	3–1	Yverdon-Sport	Lausanne
14:15	Sanches 2' 56'; Okou 20' (yellow card) 45+1'; Roche (yellow card) 42'; Sow (yellow card) 58'	Report	Łęgowski (yellow card) 12'; Marques (yellow card) 67'; Aké 77' (pen.)	Stadium: Stade de la Tuilière; Attendance: 8,765; Referee: (Switzerland) Mirel Turkes

28 September 2024 8	Servette	1–0	Lausanne-Sport	Genève
18:00	Kutesa 32'; Cognat (yellow card) 75'; Stevanović (yellow card) 90+1'	Report	Dussenne (yellow card) 21'; Raoul Luca Giger (yellow card) 45+1'; Magnin (yellow card) 84'	Stadium: Stade de Genève; Attendance: 12,185; Referee: (Switzerland) Lukas Fähndrich

5 October 2024 9	Luzern	2–2	Lausanne-Sport	Lucerne
18:00	Rrudhani 30'; Grbić (yellow card) 51'; Knezevic (yellow card) 76'; Levin Winkler 80'	Report	Ajdini 8'; Sanches (yellow card) 14' (goal) 18'; Sow (yellow card) 51'	Stadium: Swissporarena; Attendance: 10,665; Referee: (Switzerland) Lionel Tschudi

20 October 2024 10	Lausanne-Sport	2–0	Winterthur	Lausanne
16:30	Sanches 8'; Raoul Luca Giger (yellow card) 17'; Ajdini 23'; Diogo Carraco (yellow card) 68'	Report	Arnold (yellow card) 3'; Stillhart (yellow card) 37'; Lukembila (yellow card) 70'	Stadium: Stade de la Tuilière; Attendance: 5,143; Referee: (Switzerland) Anojen Kanagasingam

=== Swiss Cup ===
18 August 2024 First round	FC Champel	0–7	Lausanne-Sport	Trois-Chenes
14:30		Report	Sanches 29' 48'; Ajdini 45'; de la Fuente 46'; Okou 59'; Fabricio Oviedo 74'; Roche 78'	Stadium: Stade des Trois-Chêne; Referee: (Switzerland) Anojen Kanagasingam

14 September 2024 Second round	FC Aemme	0–4	Lausanne-Sport	Zollbrück
17:00		Report	Okou 6' 75'; Sow 62' 73'	Stadium: Sportplatz Tannschachen; Referee: (Switzerland) Stefan Horisberger
