= 2026–27 BSC Young Boys season =

BSC Young Boys
2026–27 season
- President of the Board: Marcel Brülhart
- Manager: Gerardo Seoane
- Stadium: Stadion Wankdorf
- Swiss Super League: 2nd
- Swiss Cup: Round of 32
- Top goalscorer: League: Samuel Essende (4); All: Samuel Essende (5)
- Biggest win: Thun 0–6 Young Boys
Home colours	Away colours	Third colours

The 2026–27 football season is the 129th season in the history of Berner Sport Club Young Boys and the 25th consecutive season in the Swiss premier division. The club will also participate in the Swiss Cup.

== Transfers ==
=== In ===
Pos.	Player	Transferred from	Fee	Date	Source
FW	(Venezuela) Sergio Córdova	(United States) St. Louis City SC	Loan return	30 June 2026	
DF	(Switzerland) Lewin Blum	(Belgium) Charleroi	Loan return	30 June 2026	
MF	(Switzerland) Kastriot Imeri	(Switzerland) Thun	Loan return	30 June 2026	
DF	(Switzerland) Rhodri Smith	(Switzerland) Winterthur	Loan return	30 June 2026	
FW	(Switzerland) Emmanuel Tsimba	(Switzerland) Grasshopper	Loan return	30 June 2026	
GK	(Cyprus) Joël Mall	(Switzerland) Servette	Free	1 July 2026	
MF	(Czech Republic) Dominik Pech	(Czech Republic) Slavia Prague	€3,000,000 (Note: Loan made permanent)	1 July 2026	
DF	(Switzerland) Cédric Zesiger	(Germany) FC Augsburg	Undisclosed	3 July 2026	
DF	(Switzerland) Isaac Schmidt	(England) Leeds United	€1,300,000	16 July 2026	
FW	(Senegal) Kaly Sène	(England) Middlesbrough	Undisclosed	8 August 2026	

=== Out ===
Pos.	Player	Transferred to	Fee	Date	Source
MF	(Ivory Coast) Chris Bedia	(Germany) Union Berlin	Loan return	30 June 2026	
DF	(Tunisia) Yan Valery	(England) Sheffield Wednesday	Loan return	30 June 2026	
GK	(Switzerland) Ardian Bajrami		Released	1 July 2026	
MF	(Switzerland) Lutfi Dalipi	(Liechtenstein) Vaduz	Loan	1 July 2026	
MF	(Poland) Łukasz Łakomy	(Belgium) Oud-Heverlee Leuven	Loan made permanent	1 July 2026	
GK	(Austria) Heinz Lindner	(Switzerland) Zürich		1 July 2026	
MF	(Madagascar) Rayan Raveloson	(Turkey) Amedspor	Undisclosed	1 July 2026	
GK	(Switzerland) David von Ballmoos	(Switzerland) Lugano	Loan made permanent	1 July 2026	
GK	(Switzerland) Ruben Salchli	(Switzerland) Kriens	Loan	1 July 2026	
DF	(France) Tanguy Zoukrou	(Turkey) Kocaelispor	Loan	6 July 2026	
FW	(The Gambia) Ebrima Colley	(Turkey) Konyaspor	Loan	15 July 2026	
FW	(Venezuela) Sergio Córdova	(Turkey) Batman Petrolspor	Loan	31 July 2026	
FW	(Switzerland) Felix Tsimba	(Belgium) Westerlo	Undisclosed	17 August 2026	

== Pre-season and friendlies ==
26 June 2026 Burkhalter Cup	Breitenrain (Switzerland)	2–0	(Switzerland) Young Boys	Bern
17:30	4' (pen.); 8'			Stadium: Spitalacker

26 June 2026 Burkhalter Cup	Young Boys (Switzerland)	1–1	(Switzerland) Thun	Bern
19:30				Stadium: Spitalacker

1 July 2026 Friendly	Austria Lustenau	0–0	(Switzerland) Young Boys	Lustenau
14:00				Stadium: Reichshofstadion; Attendance: 300

5 July 2026 Friendly	FC Kharkiv (Ukraine)	0–2	(Switzerland) Young Boys
16:00			Essende 29'; Fernandes 45+1'

10 July 2026 Friendly	Viktoria Plzeň (Czech Republic)	3–5	(Switzerland) Young Boys
15:30

16 July 2026 Friendly	FC Prishtina Bern (Switzerland)	2–0	(Switzerland) Young Boys
20:30

18 July 2026 Friendly	Young Boys (Switzerland)	5–0	(Switzerland) Étoile Carouge
15:30

== Competitions ==
=== Overall record ===
Competition	First match	Last match	Starting round	Record							
Competition	First match	Last match	Starting round	Pld	W	D	L	GF	GA	GD	Win %
Swiss Super League	26 July 2026		Matchday 1	9	5	4	0	31	18	+13	55.56
Swiss Cup	15 August 2026		Round of 64	1	1	0	0	4	0	+4	100.00
Total				10	6	4	0	35	18	+17	60.00

Last updated: 20 September 2026
Source: Competitions

=== Swiss Super League ===
Pos	Team	Pld	W	D	L	GF	GA	GD	Pts	Qualification or relegation (Note: Teams play each other three times (33 matches), before the league is split into two groups (the top six and the bottom six).)
1	Lugano	10	9	1	0	31	7	+24	28	Qualification for the Champions League second qualifying round
2	Young Boys	10	6	4	0	33	18	+15	22	Qualification for the Conference League second qualifying round (Note: The 2026–27 Swiss Cup winner will qualify for the Europa League first qualifying round. If the cup winner finishes in the top three, the second Conference League berth will be passed to the fourth place team.)
3	Sion	10	6	1	3	23	17	+6	19	Qualification for the Conference League second qualifying round
4	St. Gallen	10	5	1	4	17	19	−2	16	
5	Zürich	10	4	2	4	18	22	−4	14	

Updated to match(es) played on 11 October 2026. Source: Brack Super League - Tabelle
Rules for classification: 1) Points; 2) Goal difference; 3) Goals scored; 4) Head-to-head goal difference; 5) Head-to-head goals scored 6) Away goals scored; 7) Draw.

==== Results by round ====
Round	1	2	3	4
Ground	H	A	A	H
Result	W	W	D	W
Position	1	1	2	

Updated to match(es) played on 23 August 2026. Source:
A = Away; H = Home; W = Win; D = Draw; L = Loss

==== Matches ====
26 July 2026 1	Young Boys	4–2	Sion	Bern
14:00	Blum (yellow card) 8', (goal) 22'; Sanches 40'; Essende 66', 73'		Kabacalman (yellow card) 43'; Kronig 45+2'; Boteli 56'; Sow (yellow card) 74'	Stadium: Stadion Wankdorf; Referee: Lukas Fähndrich

1 August 2026 2	Thun	0–6	Young Boys	Thun
20:30	Bürgy (yellow card) 53'		Monteiro 10'; Blum 24'; Fernandes 33'; Essende 55' (pen.), (yellow card) 53', (goal) 90'; Imeri 68'	Stadium: Stockhorn Arena; Referee: Urs Schnyder

8 August 2026 3	Lausanne-Sport	2–2	Young Boys	Lausanne
18:00	Custodio (yellow card) 63'; Mollet 77'; Mendes (yellow card) 82'; Butler-Oyedeji 89', (yellow card) 90+5'		Imeri (yellow card) 22'; Blum (yellow card) 25'; Zesiger 48'; Fernandes (red card) 58'; Gigović (yellow card) 61'; Pech 75'	Stadium: Stade de la Tuilière; Referee: Anojen Kanagasingam

23 August 2026 4	Young Boys	4–2	Vaduz	Bern
14:00	Monteiro 4'; Sène 37'; Sanches 57'; Gigović 87'		Ćoćić 25', 43'; Stark (yellow card) 30'; Cabrera (yellow card) 46'; Simani (yellow card) 55'; Hasler (yellow card) 60'	Stadium: Stadion Wankdorf; Referee: Désirée Grundbacher

29 August 2026 5	Young Boys	3–3	Basel	Bern
20:30	Monteiro 7', (yellow card) 76'; Essende 14'; Fassnacht (yellow card) 45'; Sanches 45+1'; Blum (yellow card) 89'		32' Olaigbe; 37' Sow; (yellow card) 39', (goal) 71' Victory; (yellow card) 44' Metinho	Stadium: Stadion Wankdorf; Attendance: 29,220; Referee: Sandro Schärer

1 September 2026 6	FC Zürich	2–4	Young Boys	Zurich
20:30	Reichmuth 11'; Spadanuda (yellow card) 62'; Kamberi 86'		23', 32', 55' Fassnacht; (yellow card) 29' Pech; (yellow card) 53' Sanches; 73' Virginius; (yellow card) 90+1' Bukinac	Stadium: Letzigrund; Referee: Luca Cibelli

5 September 2026 7	Young Boys	3–3	Luzern	Bern
18:00	Essende 14', 52', (yellow card) 62'; Schmidt (yellow card) 32'; Fernandes (yellow card) 39'; Pech (yellow card) 63'; Sène 88'		(yellow card) 29' Zimmermann; 47', 49' Cigaņiks; 65' (pen.), (yellow card) 90+6' Di Giusto; (yellow card) 73' B.H. Freimann; (yellow card) 78' Bongeli; (yellow card) 90' B.M. Freimann	Stadium: Stadion Wankdorf; Referee: Fedayi San

12 September 2026 8	Lugano	2–2	Young Boys	Lugano
19:00	Dos Santos 2', (yellow card) 75'; Mai (yellow card) 49'; Papadopoulos (yellow card) 62'; Ajeti 80'		28' Essende; 45' Fassnacht; (yellow card) 61' Lauper; (yellow card) 90+4' Keller	Stadium: AIL Arena; Attendance: 8,029; Referee: Nico Gianforte

19 September 2026 9	Young Boys	3–2	Servette	Bern
18:00	Virginius 39'; Gigović (yellow card) 67'; Essende 69', 83'		13' Burch; 30' Mutandwa; (yellow card) 79' Lambourde; (yellow card) 90' Stevanović	Stadium: Stadion Wankdorf; Referee: Mirel Turkes

=== Swiss Cup ===
15 August 2026 Round of 64	FC Liestal	0–4	Young Boys	Liestal
18:00			Wüthrich 7'; Fassnacht 61'; Schmidt 72'; Essende 82'	Stadium: Stadion Gitterli
