= Sékou Fofana =

Sékou Fofana may refer to:

- Sékou Fofana (footballer, born 1980), Malian football defender
- Sékou Fofana (footballer, born 2003), Ivorian football left-back for Auxerre

== See also ==
- Seko Fofana (born 1995), Ivorian football midfielder for Rennes
