= Karim Sow =

Swiss footballer (born 2003)

Personal information
- Full name: Abdou Karim Sow
- Date of birth: 22 May 2003 (age 23)
- Place of birth: Payerne, Switzerland
- Height: 1.98 m (6 ft 6 in)
- Position: Centre-back

Team information
- Current team: Lausanne-Sport
- Number: 71

Youth career
- 2011–2016: Estavayer-le-Lac
- 2016–2017: Fribourg
- 2017–2019: Central FR
- 2019: Young Boys
- 2019: Central FR
- 2019–2021: Young Boys

Senior career*
Years	Team	Apps	(Gls)
2021–2023	Lausanne-Sport II	9	(1)
2021–	Lausanne-Sport	90	(2)
2023–2024	→ Nyon (loan)	26	(0)

International career^{‡}
2021	Switzerland U19	7	(0)
2022	Switzerland U20	3	(0)
- * Club domestic league appearances and goals as of 28 September 2026 ‡ National team caps and goals as of 27 September 2022

Abdou Karim Sow (born 22 May 2003) is a Swiss professional footballer who plays as a centre-back for Swiss Super League club Lausanne-Sport.

== Club career ==
A youth product of Estavayer-le-Lac, Fribourg, Central FR and Young Boys, Sow signed his first professional contract with Lausanne-Sport on 5 March 2021. He made his professional debut with Lausanne in a 2–2 Swiss Super League tie against Basel on 24 August 2021.

On 19 June 2023, Sow was loaned to Nyon.

== Personal life ==
Born in Switzerland, Sow is of Senegalese descent.
