= Fousseni Diabaté =

Malian footballer (born 1995)

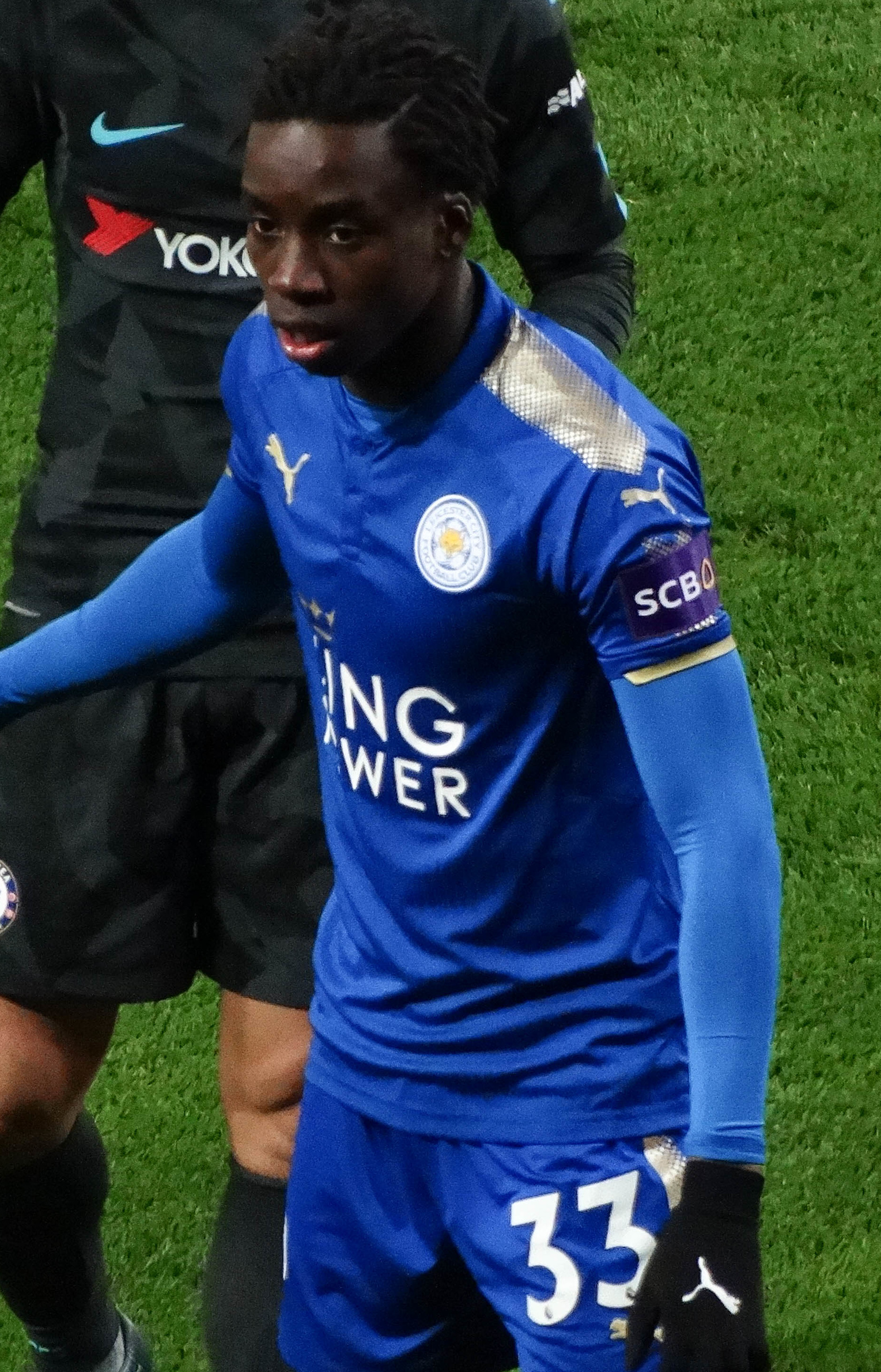
- Diabaté playing for Leicester City in 2018

Personal information
- Full name: Fousseni Diabaté
- Date of birth: 18 October 1995 (age 31)
- Place of birth: Aubervilliers, France
- Height: 1.75 m (5 ft 9 in)
- Positions: Attacking midfielder; forward

Team information
- Current team: Kasımpaşa
- Number: 34

Youth career
- 2004–2011: Rennes
- 2011–2014: Reims

Senior career*
Years	Team	Apps	(Gls)
2013–2015	Reims II	11	(1)
2015–2017	Guingamp II	49	(12)
2017–2018	Gazélec Ajaccio	18	(3)
2018–2020	Leicester City	15	(0)
2019	→ Sivasspor (loan)	17	(2)
2019–2020	→ Amiens (loan)	20	(1)
2020–2022	Trabzonspor	6	(0)
2021	→ Göztepe (loan)	18	(3)
2021–2022	→ Giresunspor (loan)	34	(6)
2022–2023	Partizan	32	(2)
2023–2025	Lausanne-Sport	60	(9)
2025–	Kasımpaşa	30	(2)

International career^{‡}
2015	Mali U20	6	(0)
2016	Mali U23	3	(0)
2023–	Mali	11	(0)
Medal record
Representing Mali
FIFA U-20 World Cup
Third place	2015 New Zealand	U-20 Team
- * Club domestic league appearances and goals as of 30 August 2026 ‡ National team caps and goals as of 23:06, 26 March 2024 (UTC)

Fousseni Diabaté (born 18 October 1995) is a professional footballer who plays as an attacking midfielder or forward for Turkish Süper Lig club Kasımpaşa. Born in France, he plays for the Mali national team.

== Club career ==
Diabaté was born in Aubervilliers, Seine-Saint-Denis. He was at the youth academy at Stade Rennais for seven years before being kicked out, and thereafter joined Stade de Reims. He played for the reserves of En Avant de Guingamp before joining Gazélec Ajaccio on 20 June 2017. He made his professional debut with Gazélec Ajaccio in a 1–1 Ligue 2 tie with Valenciennes FC on 28 July 2017, assisting his side's only goal.

On 13 January 2018, Diabaté moved to Leicester City for an undisclosed fee. Two weeks later, he made his debut for Leicester City in the FA Cup fourth round match against Peterborough United and scored twice in a 5–1 win.

He joined Sivasspor on loan in January 2019.

On 25 September 2020, Diabaté joined Trabzonspor on a permanent deal.

On 7 July 2022, it was announced that Diabaté signed a three-year contract with Serbian club Partizan being handed the #18 shirt. Diabaté made his debut on 23 July against TSC in a 0–0 draw; he came into the game in the 57th minute as a sub for Nikola Terzić. On 11 August, Diabaté made his second appearance in the UEFA Europa League third qualifying round, a 2–2 home draw against AEK Larnaca. He provided two assists for Ricardo Gomes, Diabaté scored the first goal in a 4–1 win over Ħamrun Spartans in the UEFA Europa Conference League play-off round.

In the group stage, Diabaté played in all six games and scored four goals. Diabaté scored his debut goal in the SuperLiga on the road against Napredak. Diabaté made a sudden attempt, the ball caught Dejan Kerkez on the way to the goal and outwitted the helpless Nikola Petrić.

On 7 September 2023, Diabaté signed a two-year contract with Lausanne-Sport in Switzerland.

== International career ==
Diabaté made one appearance for the Mali U20s at the 2015 FIFA U-20 World Cup in a 2–0 loss to the Serbia U20s, as well as 5 games at the 2015 African U-20 Championship. He also appeared for the Mali U23s at the 2016 Toulon Tournament.

== Career statistics ==
=== Club ===
As of 25 June 2025

Appearances and goals by club, season and competition
Club	Season	League			National cup		League cup		Continental		Other		Total	
Club	Season	Division	Apps	Goals	Apps	Goals	Apps	Goals	Apps	Goals	Apps	Goals	Apps	Goals
Stade Reims II	2013–14	CFA 2	11	1	—		—		—		0	0	11	1
Guingamp II	2015–16	CFA 2	23	4	—		—		—		0	0	23	4
Guingamp II	2016–17	CFA 2	26	8	—		—		—		0	0	26	8
Guingamp II	Total		49	12	0	0	0	0	0	0	0	0	49	12
Guingamp	2016–17	Ligue 1	0	0	1	0	1	0	—		0	0	2	0
Gazélec Ajaccio	2017–18	Ligue 2	18	3	1	2	2	0	—		0	0	21	5
Leicester City	2017–18	Premier League	14	0	2	2	0	0	—		0	0	16	2
Leicester City	2018–19	Premier League	1	0	0	0	2	0	—		0	0	3	0
Leicester City	Total		15	0	2	2	2	0	0	0	0	0	19	2
Sivasspor (loan)	2018–19	Süper Lig	17	2	0	0	—		—		0	0	17	2
Amiens (loan)	2019–20	Ligue 1	20	1	1	0	3	0	—		0	0	24	1
Trabzonspor	2020–21	Süper Lig	6	0	1	0	—		—		0	0	7	0
Göztepe (loan)	2021	Süper Lig	18	3	0	0	—		—		0	0	18	3
Giresunspor (loan)	2021–22	Süper Lig	34	6	0	0	—		—		0	0	34	6
Partizan	2022–23	Serbian SuperLiga	32	2	1	0	—		12	5	0	0	45	7
Lausanne-Sport	2023–24	Swiss Super League	25	2	2	0	—		—		0	0	27	2
Lausanne-Sport	2024–25	Swiss Super League	35	7	4	1	—		—		—		39	8
Lausanne-Sport	Total		60	9	6	1	—		—		—		66	10
Kasımpaşa	2025–26	Süper Lig	27	1	0	0	—		—		—		27	1
Career total			302	40	13	5	8	0	12	5	0	0	340	50

=== International ===
As of match played on 26 March 2024

Appearances and goals by national team and year
National team	Year	Apps	Goals
Mali	2023	4	0
Mali	2024	7	0
Total		11	0
