= Alvyn Sanches =

Swiss footballer (born 2003)

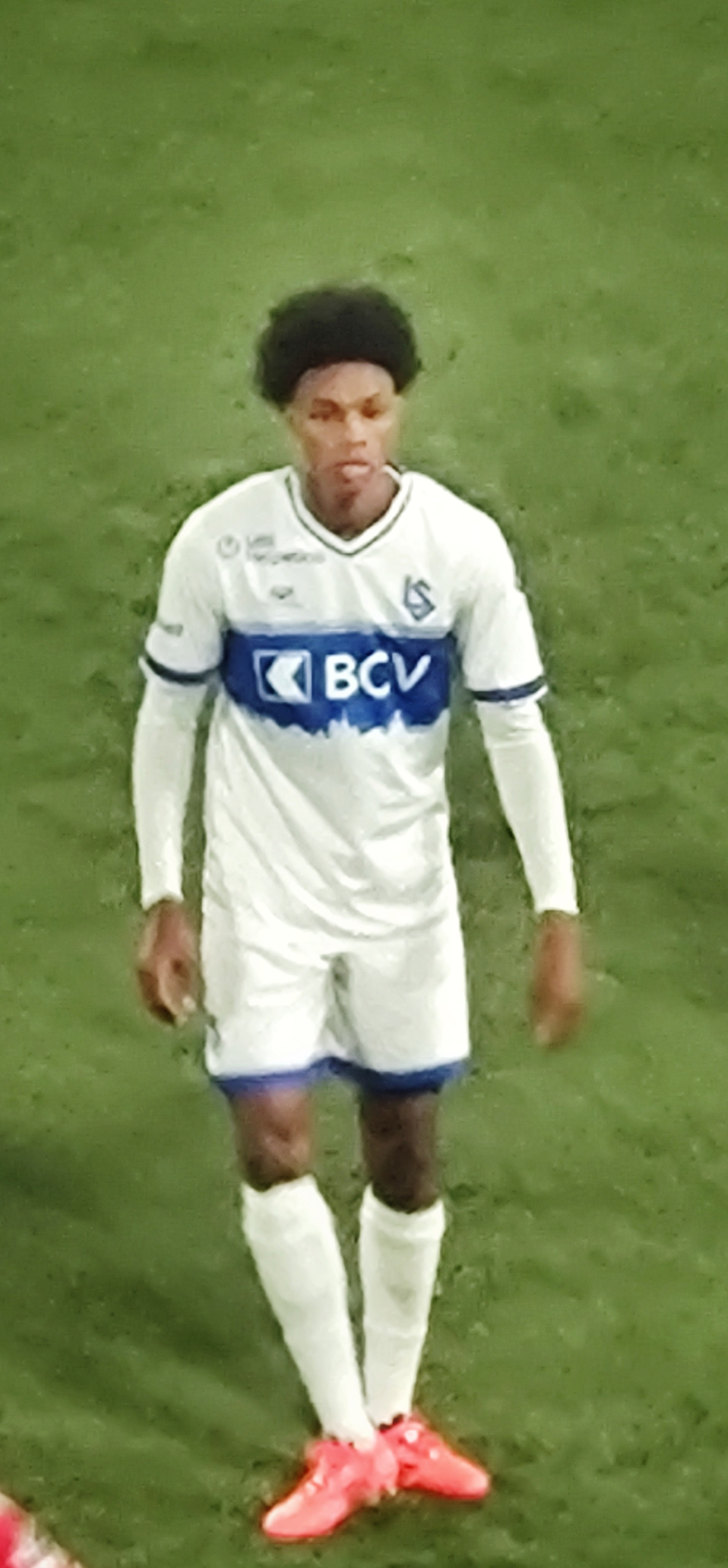
- Sanches playing for Lausanne-Sport in 2024

Personal information
- Full name: Alvyn Antonio Sanches
- Date of birth: 12 February 2003 (age 23)
- Place of birth: Créteil, France
- Height: 1.83 m (6 ft 0 in)
- Positions: Forward; attacking midfielder

Team information
- Current team: Young Boys
- Number: 10

Youth career
- 2010–2012: Lausanne Benfica
- 2012–2020: Lausanne-Sport

Senior career*
Years	Team	Apps	(Gls)
2020–2025	Lausanne-Sport	107	(25)
2025–	Young Boys	42	(15)

International career^{‡}
2022	Switzerland U20	2	(2)
2023–2024	Switzerland U21	9	(3)
2025–	Switzerland	7	(1)
- * Club domestic league appearances and goals as of 18:41, 22 November 2026 (UTC) ‡ National team caps and goals as of 22:22, 16 November 2026 (UTC)

Alvyn Antonio Sanches (born 12 February 2003) is a professional footballer who plays as a forward for Swiss Super League club Young Boys. Born in France, he represents the Switzerland national team.

== Club career ==
=== Lausanne-Sport ===
Sanches is a youth product of the academies of Lausanne Benfica and Lausanne-Sport. He signed his first contract with Lausanne-Sport on 13 November 2020. He made his professional debut with Lausanne-Sport in a 5–0 Swiss Super League loss to FC St. Gallen on 15 May 2021.

=== Young Boys ===
On 1 September 2025, his shock transfer to Swiss Super League giants Young Boys was announced. With a reported transfer sum over SFr 5 million, he became the club's record transfer.

== International career ==
Sanches was born in Créteil, France and is of Cape Verdean descent. He was raised in Switzerland. He is a youth international for Switzerland, having played up to the Switzerland under-21s.

He received his first senior international call-up on 12 March 2025. On 21 March 2025, he made his debut for Switzerland in a friendly against Northern Ireland, but suffered an anterior cruciate ligament tear in the final minutes of the game.

== Career statistics ==
=== Club ===
As of match played 19 September 2026

Appearances and goals by club, season and competition
Club	Season	League			National Cup		Europe		Other		Total	
Club	Season	Division	Apps	Goals	Apps	Goals	Apps	Goals	Apps	Goals	Apps	Goals
Lausanne-Sport	2020–21	Swiss Super League	2	0	—		—		—		2	0
Lausanne-Sport	2020–21	Swiss Super League	19	1	0	0	—		—		19	1
Lausanne-Sport	2022–23	Swiss Challenge League	33	7	3	0	—		—		36	7
Lausanne-Sport	2023–24	Swiss Super League	25	5	2	1	—		—		27	6
Lausanne-Sport	2024–25	Swiss Super League	28	12	4	3	—		—		32	15
Lausanne-Sport	Total		107	25	9	4	—		—		116	29
Young Boys	2025–26	Swiss Super League	28	10	0	0	5 (Note: Appearances in UEFA Europa League)	0	—		33	10
Young Boys	2026–27	Swiss Super League	9	3	1	0	—		—		10	3
Young Boys	Total		37	13	1	0	5	0	—		43	13
Career total			144	38	10	4	5	0	0	0	159	42

=== International ===
As of match played 16 November 2026

Appearances and goals by national team and year
National team	Year	Apps	Goals
Switzerland	2025	1	0
Switzerland	2026	6	1
Total		7	1

As of match played 16 November 2026

Scores and results list Switzerland's goal tally first, score column indicates score after each Sanches goal.

List of international goals scored by Alvyn Sanches
No.	Date	Venue	Cap	Opponent	Score	Result	Competition
1	16 November 2026	Sitterstadion, St.Gallen, Switzerland	7	Scotland	3–0	4–0	2026–27 UEFA Nations League B
