= Johnny Roche =

English footballer (1932–1988)

Personal information
- Full name: John Anthony Roche
- Date of birth: 18 May 1932
- Place of birth: Poplar, London, England
- Date of death: 1988 (aged 53–54)
- Position: Forward

Senior career*
Years	Team	Apps	(Gls)
?–1957	Margate		
1957–1959	Millwall	25	(14)
1959–1960	Crystal Palace	36	(11)
1960–?	Margate		
- * Club domestic league appearances and goals

John Anthony Roche (18 May 1932 – 1988) was an English footballer who played as a forward. He played professionally for Millwall and Crystal Palace between 1957 and 1960, making a total of 61 Football League appearances.

== Career ==
Roche was born in Poplar, London, and began his career in non-league football with Margate before signing for Millwall in 1957. In May 1959, he signed for Crystal Palace then playing in the Football League Fourth Division. He made a goal-scoring debut on 3 September in a home 3–2 win against Oldham Athletic and went on to make 36 appearances that season, scoring 11 times. At the end of the 1959–60 season, he returned to Margate.

== Personal life ==
Roche died in 1988, aged 53 or 54. His grandson Jamie Roche, born in Sweden to a Swedish mother and Roche's son (who himself played semi-professionally), is also a professional footballer.
