= Josef Vogel =

Austrian cross-country skier

Personal information
- Nationality: Austrian
- Born: 14 December 1952 (age 72); Knittelfeld, Austria

Sport
- Sport: Cross-country skiing

Josef Vogel (born 14 December 1952) is an Austrian cross-country skier. He competed in the men's 15 kilometre event at the 1976 Winter Olympics.
