= Isaac Schmidt =

Swiss footballer (born 1999)

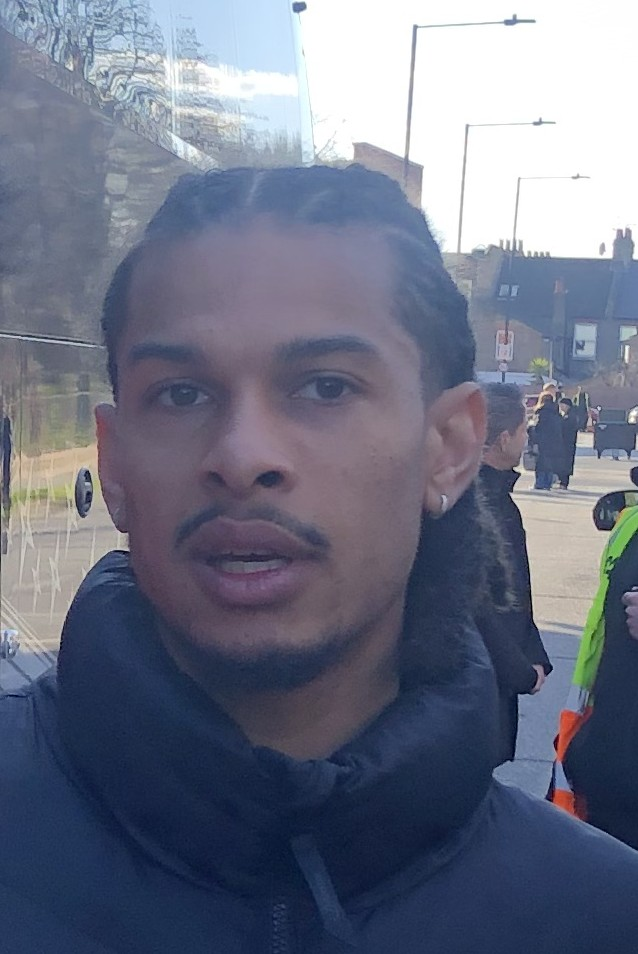
- Schmidt in 2025

Personal information
- Date of birth: 7 December 1999 (age 26)
- Place of birth: Lausanne, Switzerland
- Height: 1.72 m (5 ft 8 in)
- Position: Left-back

Team information
- Current team: Young Boys
- Number: 22

Youth career
- 2011–2015: Lausanne-Sport

Senior career*
Years	Team	Apps	(Gls)
2016–2020	Team Vaud U21	50	(15)
2020–2021	Lausanne-Sport	14	(0)
2021–2024	St. Gallen	92	(6)
2024–2026	Leeds United	12	(0)
2025–2026	→ Werder Bremen (loan)	19	(1)
2026–	Young Boys	8	(0)

International career^{‡}
2019	Switzerland U19	2	(0)
2025–	Switzerland	7	(0)
- * Club domestic league appearances and goals as of 18:43, 19 September 2026 (UTC) ‡ National team caps and goals as of 22:15, 16 November 2026 (UTC)

Isaac Schmidt (born 7 December 1999) is a Swiss professional footballer who plays as a left-back for Super League club Young Boys and the Switzerland national team.

== Club career ==
=== Lausanne-Sport ===
On 14 June 2019, Schmidt signed his first professional contract with Lausanne-Sport. He made his professional debut in a 1–0 Swiss Super League loss to St. Gallen on 13 December 2020.

=== St. Gallen ===
In June 2021, Schmidt signed a two-year contract with fellow Swiss Super League club St. Gallen.

=== Leeds United ===
On 30 August 2024, Schmidt signed for EFL Championship club Leeds United on a four-year contract for a fee of £2.5 million.

Schmidt joined Bundesliga side Werder Bremen on loan for the 2025–26 season.

=== BSC Young Boys ===
On 16 July, 2026, Schmidt signed for Swiss club BSC Young Boys for a fee of £2.5 million.

== International career ==
Schmidt was born in Switzerland to a Swiss German father and Nigerian mother. He is a youth international for Switzerland, having played for the Switzerland U19s in 2019.

== Career statistics ==
=== Club ===
As of match played 19 September 2026

Appearances and goals by club, season and competition
Club	Season	League			National cup (Note: Includes Swiss Cup, FA Cup)		League cup (Note: Includes EFL Cup)		Other		Total	
Club	Season	Division	Apps	Goals	Apps	Goals	Apps	Goals	Apps	Goals	Apps	Goals
Lausanne-Sport	2019–20	Swiss Challenge League	7	0	0	0	—		—		7	0
Lausanne-Sport	2020–21	Swiss Super League	7	0	1	0	—		—		8	0
Lausanne-Sport	Total		14	0	1	0	—		—		15	0
St. Gallen	2021–22	Swiss Super League	25	1	4	0	—		—		29	1
St. Gallen	2022–23	Swiss Super League	29	2	3	0	—		—		32	2
St. Gallen	2023–24	Swiss Super League	34	2	1	0	—		—		35	2
St. Gallen	2024–25	Swiss Super League	4	1	0	0	—		5 (Note: Appearances in UEFA Conference League)	1	9	1
St. Gallen	Total		92	6	8	0	—		5	1	105	7
Leeds United	2024–25	Championship	12	0	2	0	0	0	—		14	0
Werder Bremen (loan)	2025–26	Bundesliga	19	1	0	0	—		—		19	1
Young Boys	2026–27	Swiss Super League	8	0	1	1	—		—		9	1
Career total			145	7	11	1	0	0	5	1	162	9

=== International ===
As of match played 16 November 2026

Appearances and goals by national team and year
National team	Year	Apps	Goals
Switzerland	2025	5	0
Switzerland	2026	2	0
Total		7	0

== Honours ==
Leeds United

- EFL Championship: 2024–25
