= Lutfi Dalipi =

Kosovan footballer

Personal information
- Date of birth: 23 May 2006 (age 20)
- Place of birth: Riaz, Switzerland
- Height: 1.83 m (6 ft 0 in)
- Position: Attacking midfielder

Team information
- Current team: Vaduz (on loan from Young Boys)
- Number: 11

Youth career
- 2014–2020: FC Billens
- 2020: FC Central FR
- 2020–2026: Young Boys

Senior career*
Years	Team	Apps	(Gls)
2023–2026	Young Boys U21	58	(8)
2026–	Young Boys	0	(0)
2026	→ Wil (loan)	9	(2)
2026–	→ Vaduz (loan)	13	(5)

International career^{‡}
2023–2024	Switzerland U18	3	(0)
2025–2026	Switzerland U20	6	(0)
2026	Switzerland U21	2	(0)
- * Club domestic league appearances and goals as of 7 November 2026 ‡ National team caps and goals as of 12 November 2026

Lutfi Dalipi (born 23 May 2006) is a professional footballer who plays as a attacking midfielder for Vaduz, on loan from Young Boys. Born in Switzerland, he represented that nation at youth international levels but in 2026 switched to play for Kosovo national team.

== Club career ==
=== Young Boys ===
Dalipi began playing football at FC Billens, a club based in the canton of Fribourg, before joining FC Central FR in February 2020. In August of the same year, he moved to the youth academy of Young Boys, where he continued his development through the club's youth teams before progressing to its under-21 side, which competed in the Swiss Promotion League.

During the 2025–26 season, Dalipi established himself as one of the under-21 team's leading attacking players, recording eight goals and ten assists in 20 appearances in the Promotion League. His performances earned him a first professional contract with Young Boys, which was announced on 1 April 2026 and ran until June 2030.

==== Loan to Wil ====
Dalipi joined Wil on loan in March 2026, making the transition to senior professional football in the Swiss Challenge League. He quickly became part of the first team, featuring regularly during the closing stages of the 2025–26 season.

He made nine league appearances, scoring twice and providing one assist, and featured in each of the club's remaining nine league fixtures of the season.

==== Loan to Vaduz ====
On 27 May 2026, Vaduz announced the signing of Dalipi on a season-long loan for the 2026–27 campaign. The move brought him to the Swiss Super League following his first experience in senior professional football with Wil. Vaduz's sporting director, Franz Burgmeier, revealed that the club had been monitoring Dalipi for an extended period and had maintained regular contact with Young Boys before reaching an agreement for his transfer. He also noted that Dalipi had attracted interest from other clubs before ultimately choosing Vaduz.

Dalipi quickly established himself as one of Vaduz's leading attacking players, operating primarily as an attacking midfielder but also being deployed as a striker. During the opening seven rounds of the league, he scored three goals and provided seven assists, contributing directly to ten of the team's first sixteen goals. His performances helped Vaduz record the division's second-highest attacking output at that stage, although the club had collected only six points due to defensive shortcomings.

His start to the campaign also saw him achieve several statistical milestones. According to the Swiss Football League, Dalipi became the first player aged 20 or younger to record ten goal contributions within the opening seven rounds of the competition, as well as the first Swiss player to reach that mark at such an early stage of a season. His seven assists made him the league's leading provider at the time, while his ten goal contributions placed him level with Samuel Essende of Young Boys. Historical league statistics, based on detailed records available since the 2017–18 season, showed that only Munas Dabbur and Arthur Cabral had previously registered more contributions, with twelve each, after the same number of rounds.

One of his notable performances came in a 3–1 home victory against Lausanne-Sport on 5 September 2026. Dalipi opened the scoring in the 19th minute before providing assists for the goals scored by Miloš Ćoćić and Juan Ignacio Cabrera, helping Vaduz secure their second league victory of the campaign and move away from the bottom of the table.

By 21 October 2026, Dalipi had recorded nine assists in ten league appearances, bringing him closer to the competition's single-season assist record of 21, set by Xherdan Shaqiri during the 2023–24 campaign. In an interview with Blick, he expressed his ambition to challenge the record, explaining that he preferred creating scoring opportunities for his teammates to scoring goals himself. He also identified former German international Mesut Özil as one of his footballing role models, citing the midfielder's vision and ability to recognise spaces and create opportunities.

In November 2026, Dalipi discussed his development and performances under manager Marc Schneider, crediting the confidence and tactical freedom provided by the coaching staff with allowing him to express his creativity on the pitch. He described creativity as his principal strength, while identifying physical development and improving his efficiency in front of goal as areas for further improvement. By 5 November, he had recorded five goals and nine assists in twelve league appearances, placing him among the competition's leading contributors to goals. Only Young Boys forward Samuel Essende had registered more goal contributions at that stage.

== International career ==
Born and raised in Switzerland, Dalipi is the son of an Albanian father from Preševo and a Portuguese mother. He was eligible to represent four countries at international level: Albania, Kosovo, Portugal and Switzerland, he represented the latter at youth level, making a total of eleven appearances for the under-18, under-20 and under-21 teams.

In early November 2026, Dalipi revealed that he had decided not to pursue a senior international career with Switzerland and was weighing his options between representing Kosovo and Albania. On 12 November 2026, Football Federation of Kosovo president Agim Ademi personally welcomed him at Pristina International Airport, where he announced that Dalipi had opted to represent Kosovo at senior international level.
