= Switzerland national under-19 football team =

Swiss national football team

Switzerland
- Nickname: Schweizer Nati
- Association: Swiss Football Association
- Confederation: UEFA (Europe)
- Head coach: Johann Vogel
- FIFA code: SUI
First colours	Second colours

The Swiss national under-19 football team is the national under-19 football team of Switzerland and is controlled by Swiss Football Association.

== Players ==
=== Current Squad ===
The following players were called up for simultaneous 2026 UEFA European Under-19 Championship qualification elite round and 2027 UEFA European Under-19 Championship qualification first-round fixtures between 25-31 March 2026.

- 2026 UEFA European Under-19 Championship qualification opponents: Croatia, France, Norway.
- 2027 UEFA European Under-19 Championship qualification opponents: Hungary, Wales, France.

No.	Pos.	Player	Date of birth (age)	Club
	GK	Bennett Hoch	14 November 2007 (age 18)	(Swiss Football Association) Basel
	GK	Noah Brogli	28 May 2008 (age 18)	(Swiss Football Association) Winterthur
	GK	Lionel Huwiler	17 February 2007 (age 19)	(Swiss Football Association) Luzern
	GK	Kader Cherif	11 January 2008 (age 18)	(Swiss Football Association) Young Boys
	DF	Cyrill May	6 February 2007 (age 19)	(Swiss Football Association) St. Gallen
	DF	Marvin Akahomen	15 July 2007 (age 19)	(Swiss Football Association) Basel
	DF	Gian Stork	12 March 2007 (age 19)	(Swiss Football Association) Zürich
	DF	Sambou Camara	20 April 2007 (age 19)	(Swiss Football Association) Winterthur
	DF	Erblin Sadikaj	13 March 2008 (age 18)	(Swiss Football Association) Luzern
	DF	Sirak Bein	7 August 2007 (age 19)	(French Football Federation) Monaco (Note: Monaco is a Monégasque club playing in the French football league system.)
	DF	Nelson Savonnier	28 February 2008 (age 18)	(Swiss Football Association) Sion
	DF	Gil Zufferey	2 March 2008 (age 18)	(Swiss Football Association) Young Boys
	DF	Aron Martins	10 July 2008 (age 18)	(Swiss Football Association) Zürich
	DF	Tidiane Diallo	25 January 2008 (age 18)	(French Football Federation) Montpellier
	DF	Olivier Mambwa	15 December 2008 (age 17)	(Swiss Football Association) Young Boys
	DF	Miguel Adje	3 February 2008 (age 18)	(German Football Association) Borussia Dortmund
	DF	Joachim Williamson	5 November 2007 (age 19)	(Italian Football Federation) Inter Milan
	DF	Gabriel Morisoli	17 July 2008 (age 18)	(Italian Football Federation) Parma
	DF	Marco Correia	24 February 2008 (age 18)	(Swiss Football Association) Basel
	MF	Elio Rufener	12 February 2007 (age 19)	(Swiss Football Association) Young Boys
	MF	Leonit Ibraimov	16 June 2008 (age 18)	(Swiss Football Association) St. Gallen
	MF	Aaron Tchamda	7 January 2007 (age 19)	(Swiss Football Association) Zürich
	MF	Rouven Tarnutzer	24 July 2007 (age 19)	(German Football Association) Freiburg
	MF	Jill Stiel	1 May 2008 (age 18)	(Swiss Football Association) Zürich
	MF	Leart Kabashi	29 November 2007 (age 18)	(Swiss Football Association) Grasshopper Club
	MF	Denis Sahin	23 June 2008 (age 18)	(Swiss Football Association) Grasshopper Club
	MF	Nino Weibel	11 April 2007 (age 19)	(Swiss Football Association) St. Gallen
	MF	Nico Lazri	29 January 2008 (age 18)	(Swiss Football Association) Luzern
	MF	Zidan Tairi	17 April 2007 (age 19)	(German Football Association) Hoffenheim
	MF	Mladen Mijajlović	16 March 2008 (age 18)	(German Football Association) Freiburg
	FW	Ivan Parra	28 July 2007 (age 19)	(Royal Spanish Football Federation) Almería
	FW	Lou White	22 March 2007 (age 19)	(Royal Spanish Football Federation) Girona
	FW	Norbu Lhakpa	27 June 2008 (age 18)	(Swiss Football Association) Zürich
	FW	Nicolò Puddu	19 September 2007 (age 19)	(Swiss Football Association) Lugano
	FW	Sandro Wyss	3 May 2008 (age 18)	(Swiss Football Association) Luzern
	FW	Jamie Atangana	12 November 2007 (age 18)	(Swiss Football Association) Servette
	FW	Adrien Llukes	21 July 2008 (age 18)	(Swiss Football Association) Sion
	FW	Andrej Vasović	14 October 2007 (age 19)	(Swiss Football Association) Luzern
	FW	Nevio Scherrer	8 April 2008 (age 18)	(Swiss Football Association) St. Gallen
	FW	Fabio Rissi	24 February 2008 (age 18)	(Swiss Football Association) St. Gallen

== Recent results ==
13 November 2014 2015 European Under-19 qualification	Switzerland	8-0	Gibraltar	Ferrycarrig Park, Wexford
16:00	Dominguez 32'; Oberlin 39', 45', 56'; Turkes 41', 45+3'; Zakaria 58'; João Oliveira 65'	Report		Referee: Sergey Tsinkevich (Belarus)

15 November 2014 2015 European Under-19 qualification	Malta	1-7	Switzerland	Regional Sports Centre, Waterford
16:00	Guillaumier 8'	Report	Hunziker 27', 33', 63', 76', 77'; Pagliuca 58'; Elvedi 71'	Referee: Radu Petrescu (Romania)

18 November 2014 2015 European Under-19 qualification	Switzerland	1–1	Republic of Ireland	Regional Sports Centre, Waterford
15:00	Turkes 2'	Report	Grego-Cox 48'	Referee: Sergey Tsinkevich (Belarus)

26 March 2015 2015 European Under-19 qualification	Switzerland	0–1	Norway	Mardijk, Assen
16:00		Report	Utvik 50'	Referee: Mitja Žganec (Slovenia)

28 March 2015 2015 European Under-19 qualification	Serbia	3–1	Switzerland	Sportpark de Bosk, Harkema
14:00	Šaponjić 12', 77'; Živković 29' (pen.)	Report	Turkes 86'	Referee: Mitja Žganec (Slovenia)

31 March 2015 2015 European Under-19 qualification	Switzerland	0–4	Netherlands	Sportpark de Bosk, Harkema
19:00		Report	Riedewald 21'; Nouri 41', 82'; Van Amersfoort 73'	Referee: Steven McLean (Scotland)

== Swiss national teams ==
- Switzerland national football team
- Switzerland national under-23 football team (also known as Swiss Olympic)
- Switzerland national under-21 football team
- Switzerland national under-20 football team
- Switzerland national under-18 football team
- Switzerland national under-17 football team
- Switzerland national under-16 football team

== See also ==
- European Under-19 Football Championship
