= Bung Meng Freimann =

Swiss footballer (born 2005)

Personal information
- Date of birth: 9 December 2005 (age 20)
- Place of birth: Switzerland
- Height: 1.84 m (6 ft 0 in)
- Position: Defender

Team information
- Current team: FC Luzern
- Number: 46

Youth career
- –2024: FC Luzern

Senior career*
Years	Team	Apps	(Gls)
2023–	FC Luzern II	28	(1)
2024–	FC Luzern	59	(4)

International career^{‡}
2024–	Switzerland U20	2	(0)
- * Club domestic league appearances and goals as of 28 September 2026 ‡ National team caps and goals as of 14 October 2024

Bung Meng Freimann (born 9 December 2005) is a Swiss professional footballer who plays as a defender for FC Luzern.

== Early life ==
Freimann was born on 9 December 2005 in Switzerland and is a native of Ennetbürgen, Switzerland. Born to a Swiss father and a Vietnamese-born Chinese mother, he has an older sister and two older brothers. Growing up, he regarded Netherlands international Virgil van Dijk as his football idol.

== Club career ==
As a youth player, Freimann joined the youth academy of FC Luzern and was promoted to the club's senior team in 2024. On 23 November 2024, he debuted for them during a 1–1 draw with BSC Young Boys in the League.
