= Dominik Pech =

Czech footballer (born 2006

Personal information
- Date of birth: 4 September 2006 (age 20)
- Place of birth: Czech Republic
- Height: 1.84 m (6 ft 0 in)
- Position: Midfielder

Team information
- Current team: Young Boys
- Number: 13

Youth career
- –2013: Admira Prague
- 2013–2023: Slavia Prague

Senior career*
| Years | Team | Apps | (Gls) |
| 2023–2026 | Slavia Prague | 14 | (1) |
| 2023–2025 | Slavia Prague B | 37 | (4) |
| 2025–2026 | → Young Boys (loan) | 28 | (2) |
| 2025–2026 | → Young Boys U21 (loan) | 1 | (0) |
| 2026– | Young Boys | 9 | (1) |

International career^{‡}
| 2022–2023 | Czech Republic U17 | 11 | (1) |
| 2023–2024 | Czech Republic U18 | 5 | (0) |
| 2024–2025 | Czech Republic U19 | 8 | (3) |
| 2025– | Czech Republic U20 | 2 | (0) |
| 2025– | Czech Republic U21 | 3 | (0) |
- * Club domestic league appearances and goals as of 19 September 2026 ‡ National team caps and goals as of 31 March 2026

Dominik Pech (born 4 September 2006) is a Czech professional footballer who plays as a midfielder for Swiss Super League club Young Boys.

== Club career ==
As a youth player, Pech joined the youth academy of Czech side Admira Prague. Following his stint there, he joined the youth academy of Czech side Slavia Prague in 2013 and was promoted to the club's reserve team in 2023, where he made thirty-seven league appearances and scored four goals and helped them achieve promotion from the third tier to the second tier.

Ahead of the 2025–26 season, he was sent on loan to Swiss side Young Boys.

== International career ==
Pech is a Czech Republic youth international. During October 2024 and March 2025, he played for the Czech Republic under-19 team for 2025 UEFA European Under-19 Championship qualification.

== Style of play ==
Pech plays as a midfielder. Right-footed, he is known for his dribbling ability.

== Career statistics ==
=== Club ===
As of match played 19 September 2026

Appearances and goals by club, season and competition
| Club | Season | League | | | National cup (Note: Includes Czech Cup, Swiss Cup) | | Continental | | Other | | Total | |
| Club | Season | Division | Apps | Goals | Apps | Goals | Apps | Goals | Apps | Goals | Apps | Goals |
|---|---|---|---|---|---|---|---|---|---|---|---|---|
| Slavia Prague | 2022–23 | Czech First League | 1 | 0 | 0 | 0 | — | | — | | 1 | 0 |
| Slavia Prague | 2024–25 | Czech First League | 13 | 1 | 3 | 0 | 4 (Note: Appearances in UEFA Europa League) | 0 | — | | 20 | 1 |
| Slavia Prague | Total | | 14 | 1 | 3 | 0 | 4 | 0 | — | | 21 | 1 |
| Slavia Prague B | 2023–24 | Czech National Football League | 21 | 4 | — | | — | | — | | 21 | 4 |
| Slavia Prague B | 2024–25 | Czech National Football League | 16 | 0 | — | | — | | — | | 16 | 0 |
| Slavia Prague B | Total | | 37 | 4 | — | | — | | — | | 37 | 4 |
| Young Boys (loan) | 2025–26 | Swiss Super League | 28 | 2 | 2 | 0 | 7 | 0 | — | | 37 | 2 |
| Young Boys U21 (loan) | 2025–26 | Swiss Promotion League | 1 | 0 | — | | — | | — | | 1 | 0 |
| Young Boys | 2026–27 | Swiss Super League | 9 | 1 | 1 | 0 | — | | — | | 10 | 1 |
| Career total | | | 89 | 8 | 5 | 0 | 11 | 0 | 0 | 0 | 105 | 8 |

== Honours ==
Slavia Prague

- Czech First League: 2024–25
