= Olivier Mambwa =

Swiss footballer

Personal information
- Date of birth: 5 December 2008 (age 17)
- Place of birth: Bern, Switzerland
- Height: 1.87 m (6 ft 2 in)
- Position: Left-back

Team information
- Current team: Thun (on loan from Young Boys)
- Number: 2

Youth career
- 2018–2021: Bümpliz
- 2021–2020: FC Köniz
- 2021–2023: Young Boys
- 2023: FC Köniz
- 2023–2025: Young Boys

Senior career*
Years	Team	Apps	(Gls)
2025–	Young Boys U21	18	(0)
2025–	Young Boys	7	(0)
2026–	→ Thun (loan)	4	(0)

International career^{‡}
2023	Switzerland U15	2	(0)
2023–2024	Switzerland U16	8	(0)
2024–2025	Switzerland U17	11	(0)
2025–	Switzerland U18	4	(1)
2026–	Switzerland U19	3	(0)
- * Club domestic league appearances and goals as of 20 September 2026 ‡ National team caps and goals as of 31 March 2026

Olivier Mambwa (born 5 December 2008) is a Swiss professional footballer who plays as a left-back for the Swiss Super League club Thun on loan from Young Boys.

== Club career ==
Mambwa is a product of the youth academies of the Swiss clubs Bümpliz, FC Köniz and Young Boys. He made his senior and professional debut with Young Boys in a 3–1 Swiss Super League win over FC Lugano on 31 August 2025, assisting his side's second goal. He was named to The Guardian's Next Generation 2025: 60 of the best young talents in world football list.

== International career ==
Mambwa was born in Switzerland to a DR Congolese father and Swiss mother. He was called up to the Switzerland U17s for a set of 2025 UEFA European Under-17 Championship qualification matches in March 2025.

== Career statistics ==
As of match played 14 February 2026

Appearances and goals by club, season and competition
Club	Season	League			Cup		Europe		Other		Total	
Club	Season	Division	Apps	Goals	Apps	Goals	Apps	Goals	Apps	Goals	Apps	Goals
Young Boys U21	2024–25	Swiss Promotion League	2	0	—		—		—		2	0
Young Boys U21	2025–26	Swiss Promotion League	4	0	—		—		—		4	0
Young Boys U21	Total		6	0	—		—		—		6	0
Young Boys	2025–26	Swiss Super League	7	0	0	0	0	0	—		7	0
Career total			13	0	0	0	0	0	0	0	13	0
