= Kevin Spadanuda =

Swiss footballer (born 1997)

Personal information
- Date of birth: 16 January 1997 (age 29)
- Place of birth: Bülach, Switzerland
- Height: 1.77 m (5 ft 10 in)
- Position: Midfielder

Team information
- Current team: Zürich
- Number: 17

Youth career
- Aarau

Senior career*
Years	Team	Apps	(Gls)
2015–2016	Team Aarau U21	11	(4)
2017–2018	FC Schinznach Bad	11	(10)
2018	Schöftland	9	(2)
2018–2019	Baden	22	(11)
2019–2022	Aarau	90	(27)
2022–2023	Ajaccio	22	(0)
2022–2023	Ajaccio B	2	(1)
2023–2026	Luzern	75	(10)
2026–	Zürich	9	(1)
- * Club domestic league appearances and goals as of 28 September 2026

Kevin Spadanuda (born 16 January 1997) is a Swiss professional footballer who plays as a midfielder for Swiss Super League club Zürich.

== Career ==
In 2017, Spadanuda signed for Swiss eighth tier side FC Schinznach-Bad. Before the second half of 2017–18, he signed for Schöftland in the Swiss fifth tier. In 2018, he signed for Swiss fourth tier club FC Baden. In 2019, Spadanuda signed for Aarau in the Swiss second tier. In 2022, he signed for French Ligue 1 team Ajaccio.

In the summer of 2023, Spadanuda signed a three-year contract with Luzern.

== Personal life ==
Born in Switzerland, Spadanuda is of Italian and Portuguese descent.
