= Jamie Roche =

Swedish footballer (born 2001)

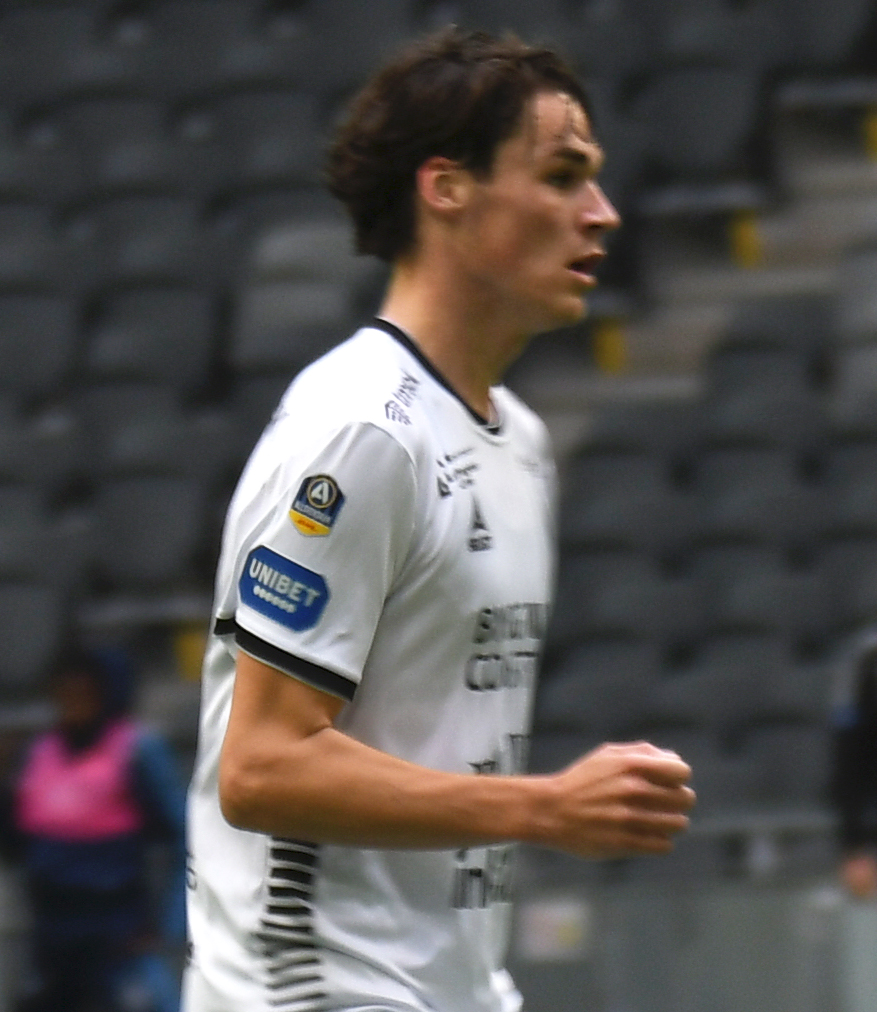
- Roche with IK Sirius in 2020

Personal information
- Full name: Jamie John Roche
- Date of birth: 5 April 2001 (age 25)
- Place of birth: Uppsala, Sweden
- Height: 6 ft 3 in (1.91 m)
- Position: Midfielder

Team information
- Current team: Kortrijk
- Number: 24

Youth career
- –2012: Bälinge IF
- 2013–2019: IK Sirius

Senior career*
| Years | Team | Apps | (Gls) |
| 2020–2023 | IK Sirius | 81 | (2) |
| 2023–2026 | Lausanne-Sport | 96 | (5) |
| 2026– | Kortrijk | 2 | (0) |

International career^{‡}
| 2021 | Sweden U20 | 2 | (0) |
- * Club domestic league appearances and goals as of 6 September 2026 ‡ National team caps and goals as of 14 November 2021

Jamie John Roche (/roʊʃ/, ROASH; born 5 April 2001) is a Swedish professional footballer who plays as a midfielder for Belgian Pro League club Kortrijk.

== Career ==
On 25 July 2023, Roche joined Swiss Super League side Lausanne-Sport on a four-year deal.

In the summer of 2026, Roche initially played the first four matches of the new 2026–27 season for Lausanne, before moving to Belgian top-flight side Kortrijk in September, where he signed a three-season contract.

== Personal life ==
Roche was born in Sweden to an English father and a Swedish mother. His father, and grandfather Johnny Roche, also played football, his father was a semi-professional footballer in England and his grandfather represented Millwall and Crystal Palace in England.
