= Sékou Fofana (footballer, born 2003) =

French-Ivorian footballer

Personal information
- Date of birth: March 25, 2003 (age 23)
- Place of birth: Saint-Denis, France
- Height: 1.78 m (5 ft 10 in)
- Position: Left-back

Team information
- Current team: Auxerre
- Number: 93

Youth career
- FC Montfermeil
- 2021: Saint-Étienne

Senior career*
Years	Team	Apps	(Gls)
2021–2024	Lausanne-Sport U21	39	(3)
2023–2024	→US Avranches (loan)	25	(1)
2024–2026	FC Lausanne-Sport	38	(2)
2026–	Auxerre	0	(0)
- * Club domestic league appearances and goals as of 19 July 2026

Sékou Fofana (born 25 March 2003) is a professional footballer who plays as a left-back for Ligue 1 club Auxerre. Born in France, he has opted to play for the Ivory Coast internationally.

== Club career ==
Fofana is a product of the youth academies of the French clubs AS Jeunesse Aubervilliers, FC Montfermeil, and Saint-Étienne. On 1 July 2021, he moved to the Swiss club Lausanne-Sport where he played for their reserves. He joined Avranches on loan in the Championnat National for the 2023–24 season on 21 August 2023. He was promoted to Lausanne-Sport's senior team in the Swiss Super League as he returned to the club for the 2024–25 season, extending his contract with the club on 4 September 2024 until 2027.

On 8 July 2026, Fofana transferred to Ligue 1 club Axuerre on a 4-year contract.

== International career ==
Born in France, Fofana is of Ivorian and Malian descent. He was called up to the Ivory Coast under-23s in March 2024.
