= Juan Ignacio Cabrera =

Uruguayan footballer (born 2003)

Personal information
- Full name: Juan Ignacio Cabrera Ros
- Date of birth: 27 February 2003 (age 23)
- Place of birth: Montevideo, Uruguay
- Height: 1.88 m (6 ft 2 in)
- Position: Attacking midfielder

Team information
- Current team: Vaduz
- Number: 10

Youth career
- 2011–2014: TuS Hiltrup
- 2014–2016: Preußen Münster
- 2016–2022: Schalke 04

Senior career*
Years	Team	Apps	(Gls)
2022–2023	FC Ingolstadt 04 II	23	(7)
2023–2025	FC Augsburg II	51	(24)
2025–2026	Greuther Fürth	3	(0)
2025–2026	Greuther Fürth II	14	(5)
2026–	Vaduz	7	(4)

International career
2018	Uruguay U17	1	(0)
2021	Germany U19	2	(0)
2022	Uruguay U20	2	(0)
- * Club domestic league appearances and goals as of 5 September 2026

Juan Ignacio Cabrera Ros (born 27 February 2003) is an Uruguayan professional footballer who plays as an attacking midfielder for Liechtensteiner Swiss Super League club Vaduz.

== Club career ==
Born in Uruguay, Cabrera moved to Germany at the age of eight, having also lived in Argentina and Brazil. He started his footballing career with TuS Hiltrup and Preußen Münster before a move to Schalke 04 in 2016. In October 2020, he was named by English newspaper The Guardian as one of the best players born in 2003 worldwide.

In September 2022, Cabrera moved to Ingolstadt 04 II. He later joined FC Augsburg II, where he finished as the top scorer of the Regionalliga Bayern in the 2024–25 season. On 28 May 2025, he signed with Greuther Fürth.

On 21 May 2026, Cabrera joined newly promoted Swiss Super League side Vaduz.

== International career ==
Having already represented Uruguay once at under-17 level, Cabrera played for Germany at under-19 level on two occasions in 2021. In 2022, he was called up to the Uruguay national under-20 football team for the first time.

== Personal life ==
Growing up, Cabrera's footballing idol was Diego Forlán.

== Career statistics ==
As of match played 5 September 2026

Appearances and goals by club, season and competition
Club	Season	League			National cup		Continental		Other		Total	
Club	Season	Division	Apps	Goals	Apps	Goals	Apps	Goals	Apps	Goals	Apps	Goals
Ingolstadt 04 II	2022–23	Bayernliga	23	7	—		—		—		23	7
FC Augsburg II	2023–24	Regionalliga Bayern	22	6	—		—		—		22	6
FC Augsburg II	2024–25	Regionalliga Bayern	29	18	—		—		—		29	18
FC Augsburg II	Total		51	24	0	0	0	0	0	0	51	24
Greuther Fürth	2025–26	2. Bundesliga	3	0	1	0	—		0	0	4	0
Greuther Fürth II	2025–26	Regionalliga Bayern	14	5	—		—		—		14	5
Vaduz	2026–27	Swiss Super League	7	4	0	0	4 (Note: Appearances in UEFA Conference League)	1	—		11	5
Career total			98	40	1	0	4	1	0	0	103	41

== Honours ==
Individual

- Regionalliga Bayern top scorer: 2024–25
