= FC Luzern =

Swiss professional football club

Luzern
- Full name: Fussball-Club Luzern
- Nickname: Die Leuchten (The Lights)
- Founded: 12 August 1901; 125 years ago
- Ground: Thermoplan Arena, Lucerne
- Capacity: 17,000
- President: Michael Sigerist
- Head coach: Jörg Portmann
- League: Swiss Super League
- 2025–26: Swiss Super League, 7th of 12
- Website: www.fcl.ch
Home colours	Away colours

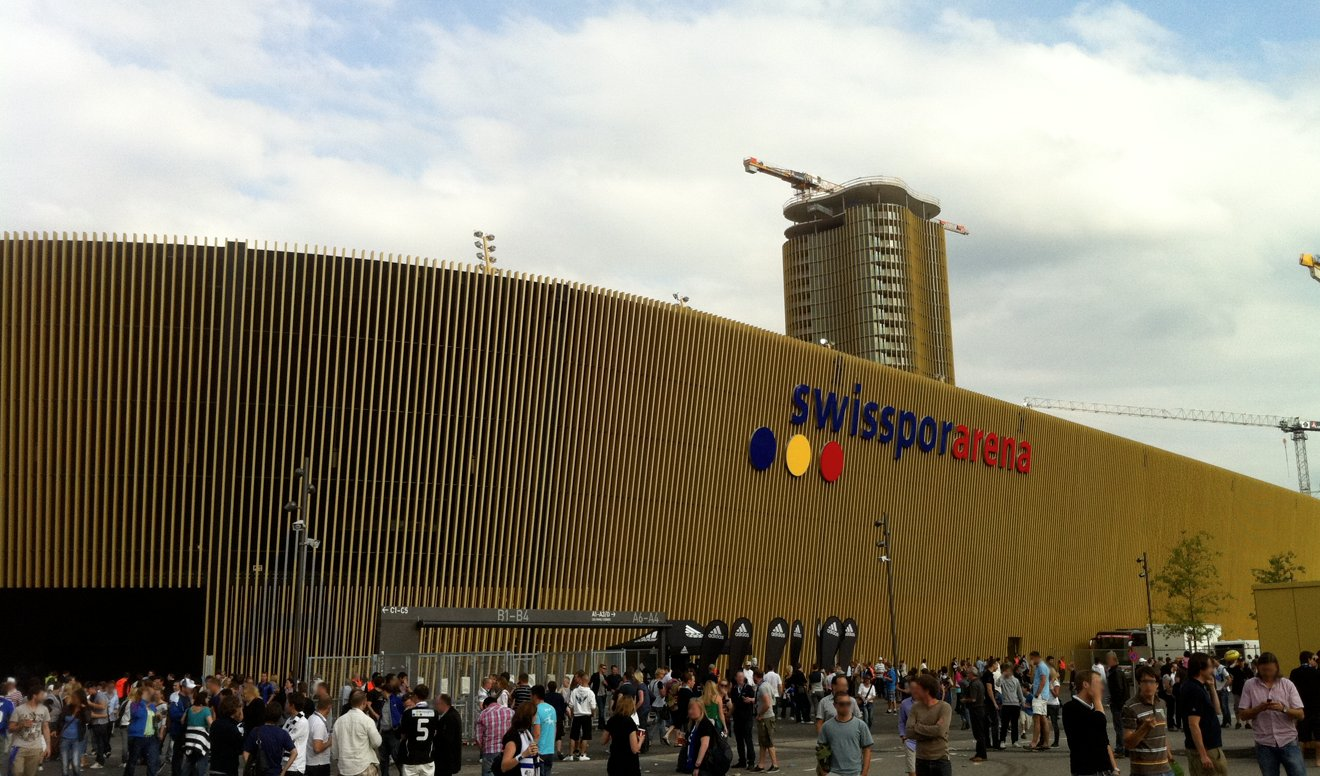
Exterior view of the new Stadion Allmend

Fussball-Club Luzern, commonly abbreviated to FC Luzern (German pronunciation: [ɛf ˈt͡seː luˈtsɛrn]) or simply FCL, is a Swiss sports club based in Lucerne (German: Luzern). They are best known for their men's professional football team, which plays in the Super League, the top tier of the Swiss football league system, and has won the national title once and the national cup three times.

The club's women's team are competing in the Swiss Women's Super League.

The club colours are blue and white, reflecting the colours of the coats of arms of the City of Lucerne and the Canton of Lucerne. The club plays its home matches at the new Stadion Allmend, which was built in 2011 on the site of the former stadium.

FC Luzern was founded in 1901. It has non-professional departments for football, volleyball, boccia and gymnastics.

== History ==
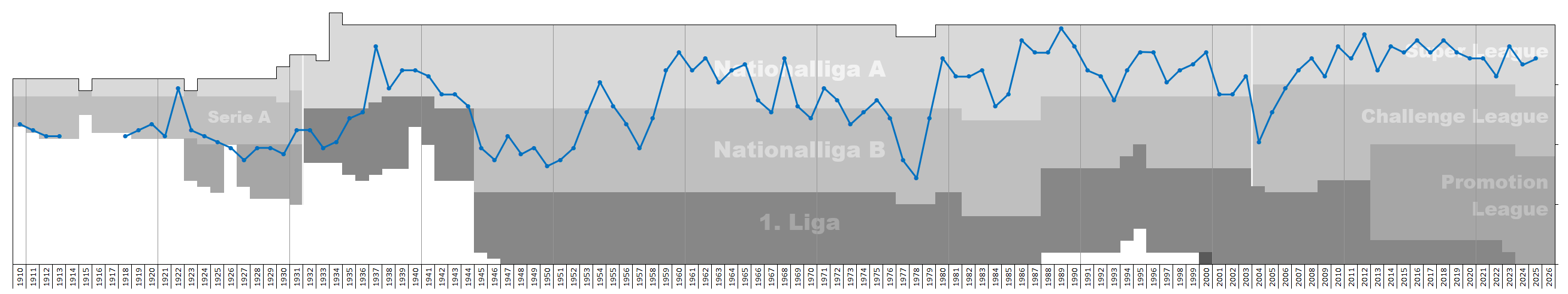
Chart of FC Luzern table positions in the Swiss football league system

FC Luzern's greatest success was winning the Swiss Championship in 1989. The club has also won the Swiss Cup three times (1960, 1992, 2021) and finished runners-up four times (1997, 2005, 2007, 2012).

With a total of 17 "moves", FC Luzern has the highest number of promotions and relegations to and from the national first tier since the establishment of a single nationwide top division in 1933.

Promotions	Relegations
9x (1936, 1953, 1958, 1967, 1970, 1974, 1979, 1993, 2006)	8x (1944, 1955, 1966, 1969, 1972, 1975, 1992, 2003)

=== The club's birth ===
The first known attempt to found a football club in Luzern dates back to 6 May 1897 when an announcement was published in the newspaper Luzerner Tagblatt advertising a meeting regarding the foundation of "FC Luzern" and invited "additional members". Even though the call did not have great resonance, this loose group of football friends can be described as a forerunner to FC Luzern.

In 1901, a second attempt was initiated by friends Adolf Coulin, Ernst Haag and Hans Walter, who knew football from the Romandie, where the game was already very popular. They met on 8 July 1901 with other football enthusiasts at Floragarten – a restaurant at Seidenhofstrasse near the train station – to arrange the establishment of FC Luzern. Only four days later on 12 July 1901, the first training was held at Allmend, a large green space south of the city centre that would later become the club's home. The official foundation took place on 12 August 1901.

The first match was held on 13 April 1902 away against SC Zofingen. In the 1–2 defeat, Albrik Lüthy became the first ever goal scorer for the club. The first match played on home ground was on 25 May 1902 with Zofingen as the opponent again. It ended with a 4–0 victory for the away side.

=== Slow start (1903–1918) ===
On 13 September 1903, FC Luzern became an official member of the Swiss Football Association (SFA). At the time, clubs were allowed to freely choose the division to play in and the club decided to compete in the third tier Serie C. Despite winning only one match in its first season, the club chose to start in the Serie B for the 1904–05 season. After finishing second for three consecutive years from 1906 until 1909, Luzern was incorporated into the Serie A by the SFA in 1909. However, the task proved to be too big for the side, and Luzern finished the season at the bottom of the league table.

Under new management, things turned to the better. For the first time, international matches were held, the first against Unione Sportiva Milanense in 1911, a 2–3 loss in Chiasso. In the second international encounter, Luzern drew 1–1 against Mulhouse, then won their first international match 4–2 over SV Stuttgart in 1912. After disappointing performances in the domestic league, Luzern finished bottom of the table in 1912 and 1913 and lost its right to play in the Serie A.

Luzern also struggled in Serie B and was threatened to become the second club in the city. Between 1913 and 1915, Luzern was defeated five times by city rival FC Kickers. For a time, even a merger with 1907 founded Kickers was a realistic scenario, but the merger was rejected by only one vote.

=== Almost champion and back to Serie B (1918–1936) ===
After five years in the second division Luzern returned to Serie A in 1918 after beating FC Baden. Dionys Schönecker, who joined FC Luzern from Austrian club Rapid Wien, became the first professional manager for the club in 1921. His appointment was an instant success as Luzern went on to win the central Swiss group of the Serie A and qualified for the final round of the championship. After defeating eastern Swiss champions Blue Stars Zürich 2–1, Luzern faced Servette Geneva in a title decider on 25 June 1922 in Basel. The hotly favoured and experienced Genevans won 2–0, even though the match could not be played to the end after Servette fans stormed the pitch due to a false signal by the referee. The followers could not be persuaded to leave the pitch and the Luzern side agreed to end the match to avoid further incidents.

Luzern fell back into old patterns and only narrowly escaped relegation in the two subsequent seasons, but was unable to avoid relegation in 1925. From 1925 to 1930, the club played in the second division and was often close to promotion. Within the SFA, the late 1920s and early 1930s were marked by failed attempts for league reform and chaotic association meetings. After formally securing promotion with its third consecutive second division title in 1929, Luzern was barred from participating in the national first tier until the spring of 1931. However, in 1931, a drastic reduction of clubs in the top division was implemented, meaning forced relegation for no less than 15 clubs, including Luzern.

=== Barren years (1936–1959) ===
A change in fortune saw Luzern promoted to the newly created Nationalliga in 1936. Despite sanctions by the SFA, the club managed to finish the 1936–37 season fourth, the side's best final league position until 1976. In the following years (which were heavily affected by World War II), FCL was not able to build on this success. Managers came and went but the club never ranked higher than the bottom four. When acclaimed international Sirio Vernati left Luzern in 1943, the team was deprived of its best player and was relegated in the spring of 1944.

In the 1940s, Luzern became a typical second division club. In 1952–53, Luzern again had a bad start to the campaign, but improved significantly as the season progressed. Promotion could be secured in the final match against local rival SC Zug.

The boom only lasted for two years and Luzern was relegated again in 1955. The club board appointed young German manager Rudi Gutendorf, whose managerial career would later span the entire planet. While Gutendorf saw the first years as a consolidation period, the team almost got instantly promoted after just one year in the second division. Promotion eventually came in 1958.

=== The first trophy and the yo-yo years (1960–1979) ===
While league performances in the Nationalliga A were erratic throughout the first half of the 1960s, Luzern won its first major national trophy by winning the Swiss Cup in 1960. The final was played against FC Grenchen. Luzern then participated in the first edition of the UEFA Cup Winners' Cup in 1960–61, but was comfortably defeated by Fiorentina (0–3, 2–6).

The success did not last long and the chronically poor financial situation and average league performances led to many managerial changes. The club was relegated once again in 1966, and Luzern developed a reputation as a "yo-yo team". Promotion in 1967 was followed by relegation in 1969, promotion in 1970, relegation in 1972, promotion in 1974, once again relegation in 1975 and finally promotion in 1979. Eleven different managers stood at the sideline during this time, among them the 1960 cup winner, local legend and later manager of the Switzerland national team, Paul Wolfisberg. His second managerial spell from 1978 to 1982 marked the beginning of one of the most successful periods in the club's history.

=== The golden years (1980–1992) ===
Luzern signed Ottmar Hitzfeld in the summer of 1980. (It was Hitzfeld's last station as a player before he started his successful managerial career in 1983.) With several mid-table finishes throughout the early 1980s, the club consolidated its position in the league. Friedel Rausch took over as a manager in 1985 and guided Luzern to their most successful era. In 1986, the club finished third and qualified for the UEFA Cup for the first time in club history. After a remarkable 0–0 away draw against Spartak Moscow, the home leg was lost 0–1 through a late winner for the Soviet side.

With a fifth-place finish in 1987 and 1988, Luzern, being widely viewed as an underdog team, sensationally won the Swiss championship in 1989. It is the single biggest success in the club's history to date. Luzern clinched the title race with a 1–0 home win against Servette in front of 24,000 fans. The deciding goal was scored by German striker Jürgen Mohr.

The league triumph entitled Luzern to participate in the European Cup, the club's first (and so far only) appearance in this competition. However, Luzern was without a realistic chance against Dutch champions PSV and suffered another early halt to their European campaigns. Unable to defend the league title in 1990, Luzern qualified for the UEFA Cup and secured its first European win against MTK Budapest, but lost to Admira Wacker Vienna in the next round.

In a sudden change of fortune in 1991–92, Luzern failed to qualify for the championship playoff group only due to goal difference and surprisingly suffered relegation after a hapless campaign in the relegation playoffs. Only days after the shock, Luzern won its third major trophy after beating FC Lugano 3–1 in the Swiss Cup final. Rausch left the club at the end of the season.

=== Decline and resurrection (1993–2006) ===
Having returned immediately to the Nationalliga A in 1993, the club could not live up to the earlier successes and played a mediocre role in the following years, with the exception of a cup final appearance in 1997 that was lost against champions FC Sion. The late 1990s and early 2000s were marked by frequent managerial changes and renewed financial struggles. The club's longstanding chairman, Romano Simioni (1975–1998), was forced to step down after a prolonged power struggle between different factions in the club. This was followed by a chaotic and scandal ridden period of financial and sporting instability. In 1999, the club avoided the withdrawal of its playing license only with a last-minute rescue campaign to raise funds. In 2001, Luzern's centenary year, the club's ownership entity, FC Luzern AG, entered administration.

After continuously precarious league performances, Luzern eventually got relegated in 2003. The fall went on and Luzern finished behind local rivals SC Kriens for the first time in club history in 2004. Luzern lost the Swiss Cup final in 2005 against FC Zürich. In 2006, under the management of former centre-back René van Eck, the team won the Swiss Challenge League and secured promotion with a 31-match unbeaten run.

=== The Super League era (2006–present) ===
Luzern appointed former Swiss international Ciriaco Sforza as manager and qualified for another Swiss Cup final that was lost against FC Basel in 2007. The Luzern board of directors fell out of patience with Sforza in 2008 after winning only one point in six matches. Luzern avoided relegation after appointing Rolf Fringer and eventually beating FC Lugano 5–1 on aggregate in the relegation playoffs in 2009.

The signing of star player Hakan Yakin in summer 2009 transformed the team into a successful side that finished third. The subsequent UEFA Europa League qualifiers were lost against Utrecht. After a mediocre 2010–11 season, Fringer was replaced with former Swiss international Murat Yakin, brother of Hakan Yakin. Luzern finished the 2011–12 season second – the highest finish since 1989 – but lost yet another Swiss Cup final for the fourth consecutive time. After a poor start to the 2012–13 season and the defeat to Genk in the UEFA Europa League playoff round, Murat Yakin was replaced with Carlos Bernegger. In similar fashion as his predecessor, Bernegger failed to confirm a good first season performance and was replaced by former German international Markus Babbel after a poor season start and a disappointing Europa League qualifier defeat against St Johnstone. Under Babbel's management, the club's performances stabilised as it finished fifth (2014–15), third (2015–16) and fifth again (2016–17). However, Luzern continuously failed to advance in UEFA Europa League qualifying rounds after aggregate defeats to Sassuolo in 2016 and Osijek in 2017.

After a disappointing first half of the 2017–18 season, Markus Babbel was replaced with U-21 manager Gerardo Seoane. Seoane's appointment had an immediate positive impact and the club finished the season 3rd. Only weeks after the end of the season, Seoane joined new Swiss champion Young Boys Bern in a surprise move. On 22 June 2018, FC Luzern announced the appointment of former Anderlecht and Nuremberg manager René Weiler. In early 2019, following a sequence of bad results and atmospheric tensions between Weiler and the club's sporting director Remo Meyer, Weiler was replaced by former Swiss international Thomas Häberli who lead the team to a 5th-place finish. Luzern progressed to the next round in a European qualifying encounter for the first time since 1992 by beating Faroese side KÍ Klaksvik 2–0 on aggregate but was subsequently eliminated by Espanyol. After a poor first half of the 2019-20 campaign, Häberli was replaced by former Marseille and Getafe midfielder Fabio Celestini.

On 24 May 2021, Luzern won their third Swiss Cup, following a 3–1 win over FC St. Gallen.

In November 2021, Fabio Celestini was dismissed as head coach of FC Luzern after a difficult start to the 2021–22 season, with the team sitting at the bottom of the league after 17 rounds. Following an interim spell under Sandro Chieffo, Liechtenstein former international Mario Frick was appointed in December 2021. Frick guided Luzern to a strong second half of the season, earning a place in the relegation play-off and ultimately securing the club’s top-flight status with victory over FC Schaffhausen. In the following 2022–23 season, Luzern finished fourth, qualifying for the UEFA Europa Conference League qualifiers. Frick subsequently extended his contract until 2026 and remained in charge through the 2025–26 season. During his tenure, Luzern finished between fourth and seventh place in the league and gave more than 20 academy players their first-team debut. In March 2026, the club and Frick mutually agreed not to extend Frick’s contract beyond the end of the 2025–26 season, bringing his four-and-a-half-year tenure to an end. He was succeeded by Jörg “Udo” Portmann, who was promoted from the club’s under-17 team and signed a contract until 2029.

== Fans and rivalries ==
Although the club has only won four important national trophies, Luzern is one of the traditional football clubs in the country with a strong local supporter base. The club draws its support predominantly from Central Switzerland, leading the number of sold season tickets in the cantons of Lucerne, Obwalden, Nidwalden, Uri, Zug as well as in some parts of Aargau and Schwyz. Since moving to the new stadium in 2011, Luzern has always ranked within the top five in terms of average attendance in the Swiss Super League with an average crowd of 9,000 to 14,000.

The local derby is played with SC Kriens, whose stadium is located about 1.3 kilometres from FC Luzern's facilities at Allmend. On 12 August 2017, Luzern beat SC Kriens 1–0 in the opening round of the 2017–18 Swiss Cup. It was the first encounter between the two sides in an official contest since 2006.

Although there are no traditional and deep rooted rivalries, periods of intensified sporting competition have sparked rivalries between Luzern and Basel in the mid-1990s and with Sion in the mid-2000s. A majority of the fans, particularly Ultra groups, view FC St. Gallen as a major rival. Matches with FC Aarau are also by many considered as a local derby and attract big numbers of Luzern supporters, especially to away matches.

== Stadium ==
In the years following its foundation, the club played, as it does today, in the Allmend neighbourhood, using a field located between the former barracks and what is now the Militärgarten restaurant.

Continuously searching for a permanent home venue, the club secured access to a pitch adjacent to the airship hangar in the Tribschen neighbourhood from early 1914 onwards. However, with the outbreak of the First World War, the site was requisitioned by the military authorities. In the autumn of 1915, FC Luzern's officials succeeded in leasing a parcel of land in the vicinity. The new Tribschen sports ground was inaugurated on 29 August 1915, when the Lucerne side defeated Grasshopper Club Zürich 5–4 in a friendly match. In 1921, the first grandstand at the Tribschen sports ground was officially opened, marking an important milestone in the club’s development. The venue remained FC Luzern’s home until the construction of the first Allmend Stadium.

Since 1934 the club has played its home games at Stadion Allmend, which was inaugurated on 6 May 1934 in a friendly match against VfR Mannheim (2:3) in front of 10,000 spectators. The stadium originally consisted of a wooden grandstand on the western side, while the remainder of the ground was formed by sloped earth embankments with concrete terraces. During the 1950s, growing attendances led to increasing calls for an expansion of the facilities. In August 1957, an enlarged main stand was inaugurated on the western side, providing 1,400 seats and accommodation for a further 1,037 standing spectators. Further improvements followed at the beginning of the 1980s, when the main stand was modernised and a covered standing terrace was constructed along the opposite side of the pitch. The Stadion Allmend reached its final configuration in 1995 with the construction of the northern stand, known as the Lumag Stand. At its height - the stadium had a capacity of 26,000. For security reasons, the Swiss Football Association restricted capacity to 13,000 in the final year of its existence. Until a new stadium was completed in 2011, Luzern temporarily played home matches at the Stadion Gersag in Emmenbrücke.

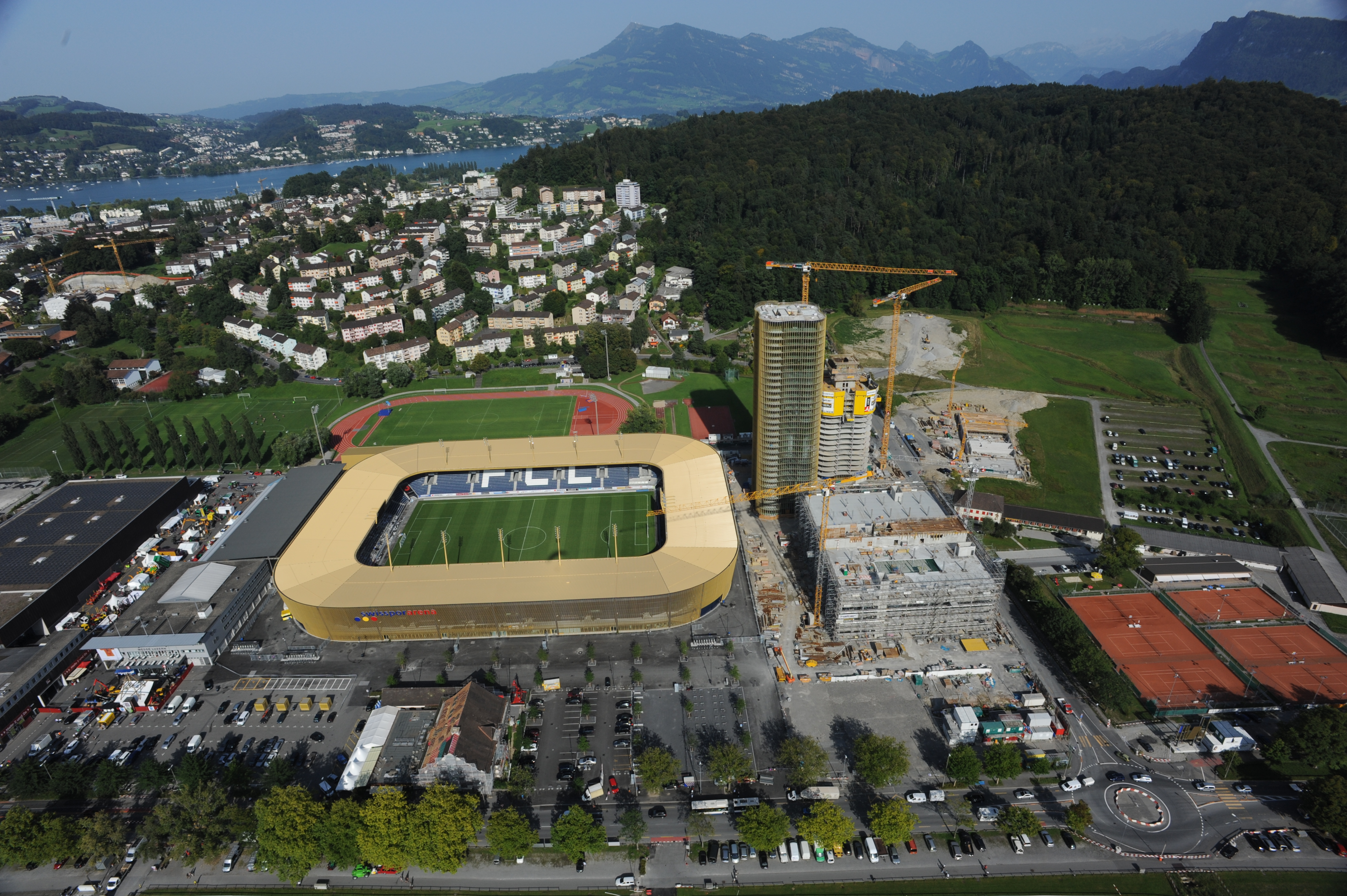
Stadion Allmend, home to FC Luzern.

In August 2011, the club moved into a newly built stadium, which has a capacity of 17,000 spectators for domestic league matches. The inaugural match ended in a 0–0 draw against FC Thun. Built on the site of the old Stadion Allmend, the venue was named after a sponsor as part of a naming rights agreement.

== Honours ==
- Swiss Super League
  - Winners (1): 1988–89
  - Runners-up (2): 1921–22, 2011–12
- Swiss Cup
  - Winners (3): 1959–60, 1991–92, 2020–21
  - Runners-up (4): 1996–97, 2004–05, 2006–07, 2011–12

The greatest success in the club's history was winning the championship in 1989 under the management of German head coach Friedel Rausch. Furthermore, the club played in six Swiss Cup finals, winning two by defeating FC Grenchen 1–0 in 1960 and FC Lugano 3–1 (after extra time) in 1992. Later, the club lost four cup finals in a row: in 1997 against Sion (4–5 on penalties), in 2005 against Zürich (1–3), and twice against Basel, in 2007 (0–1) and 2012 (2–4 on penalties). Reaching the cup final in 2005 as a second-tier club, the promotion back to the Super League in 2006, reaching the cup finals in 2007 and 2012 and winning the cup in 2021 rank as the club's most recent successes.

=== All-time league table ===
Luzern is ranked 9th in the all-time league table.

== European appearances ==
Season	Competition	Round	Club	1st leg	2nd leg	Aggregate
1960–61	UEFA Cup Winners' Cup	QF	(Italy) Fiorentina	0–3	2–6	2–9
1986–87	UEFA Cup	1R	(Soviet Union) Spartak Moscow	0–0	0–1	0–1
1989–90	European Cup	1R	(Netherlands) PSV	0–3	0–2	0–5
1990–91	UEFA Cup	1R	(Hungary) MTK Budapest	1–1	2–1	3–2
1990–91	UEFA Cup	2R	(Austria) SCN Admira/Wacker	0–1	1–1	1–2
1992–93	European Cup Winners' Cup	1R	(Bulgaria) Levski Sofia	1–2	1–0	2–2 (a)
1992–93	European Cup Winners' Cup	2R	(Netherlands) Feyenoord	1–0	1–4	2–4
1997–98	UEFA Cup Winners' Cup	1R	(Czech Republic) Slavia Prague	2–4	0–2	2–6
2010–11	UEFA Europa League	3Q	(Netherlands) Utrecht	0–1	1–3	1–4
2012–13	UEFA Europa League	PO	(Belgium) Genk	2–1	0–2	2–3
2014–15	UEFA Europa League	2Q	(Scotland) St Johnstone	1–1	1–1(a.e.t.)	2–2 (4–5 p)
2016–17	UEFA Europa League	3Q	(Italy) Sassuolo	1–1	0–3	1–4
2017–18	UEFA Europa League	2Q	(Croatia) Osijek	0–2	2–1	2–3
2018–19	UEFA Europa League	3Q	(Greece) Olympiacos	0–4	1–3	1–7
2019–20	UEFA Europa League	2Q	(Faroe Islands) KÍ Klaksvík	1–0	1–0	2–0
2019–20	UEFA Europa League	3Q	(Spain) Espanyol	0–3	0–3	0–6
2021–22	UEFA Europa Conference League	3Q	(Netherlands) Feyenoord	0–3	0–3	0−6
2023–24	UEFA Europa Conference League	2Q	(Sweden) Djurgårdens IF	1–1	2–1	3–2
2023–24	UEFA Europa Conference League	3Q	(Scotland) Hibernian	1–3	2–2	3–5

== Recent seasons ==
As of 1 July 2026.

The season-by-season performance of the club over the last years:

Season	Rank	P	W	D	L	F	A	GD	Pts	Cup	EL/ECL
2006–07	8	36	8	9	19	31	58	−27	33	Runner-up	-
2007–08	6	36	10	14	12	40	49	−9	44	R16	-
2008–09	9^{*}	36	9	8	19	45	62	−17	35	SF	-
2009–10	4	36	17	7	12	66	55	+11	58	QF	-
2010–11	6	36	13	9	14	62	57	+5	48	R16	3Q
2011–12	2	36	14	12	8	46	32	+14	54	Runner-up	-
2012–13	8	36	10	12	14	41	52	−11	42	1R	PO
2013–14	4	36	15	6	15	48	54	−6	51	SF	-
2014–15	5	36	12	11	13	54	46	+8	47	R16	2Q
2015–16	3	36	15	9	12	59	50	+9	54	SF	-
2016–17	5	36	14	8	14	62	66	−4	50	SF	3Q
2017–18	3	36	15	9	12	51	51	0	54	QF	2Q
2018–19	5	36	14	4	18	56	61	−5	46	SF	3Q
2019–20	6	36	13	7	16	42	50	−8	46	QF	3Q
2020–21	5	36	12	10	14	62	59	+3	46	Winner	-
2021–22	9**	36	9	13	14	52	64	−12	40	SF	3Q in ECL
2022–23	4	36	13	11	12	56	54	2	50	R16	-
2023–24	7	38	13	10	15	47	53	−6	49	R16	3Q in ECL
2024–25	6	38	14	10	14	66	64	2	52	2R	–
2025–26	7	38	14	11	13	76	66	10	53	QF	–

Rank = Rank in the Swiss Super League; P = Played; W = Win; D = Draw; L = Loss; F = Goals for; A = Goals against; GD = Goal difference; Pts = Points; Cup = Swiss Cup; EL = UEFA Europa League; ECL = UEFA Europa Conference League.
in = Still in competition; – = Not attended; 1R = 1st round; 2R = 2nd round; R16 = Round of sixteen; QF = Quarter-finals; SF = Semi-finals; 2Q = 2nd qualifying round; 3Q = 3rd qualifying round; PO = play-off round.
^{*}Avoided relegation by beating FC Lugano 5 – 1 on aggregate in the relegation play-offs.
^{**}Avoided relegation by beating FC Schaffhausen 4 – 2 on aggregate in the relegation play-offs.

== Players ==
=== Current squad ===
As of 14 September 2026

Note: Flags indicate national team as defined under FIFA eligibility rules; some limited exceptions apply. Players may hold more than one non-FIFA nationality.

No.	Pos.	Nation	Player
1	GK	ALB	Simon Simoni
5	DF	SUI	Stefan Knezevic
6	MF	SUI	Leonardo Bertone
7	FW	NED	Aurelio Oehlers
9	FW	AUT	Adrian Grbić
10	MF	POR	Lucas Ferreira
11	MF	SUI	Matteo Di Giusto
13	DF	SUI	Bung Hua Freimann
14	DF	LAT	Andrejs Cigaņiks
15	FW	SUI	Nando Toggenburger
16	FW	COD	Oscar Kabwit
17	FW	SUI	Sandro Wyss
18	FW	COD	Faveurdi Bongeli (on loan from TP Mazembe)
19	FW	POL	Daniel Mikołajewski (on loan from Parma)
20	MF	GER	Pius Dorn (Captain)

No.	Pos.	Nation	Player
21	DF	SUI	Loïc Lüthi
22	DF	SUI	Rúben Dantas Fernandes
24	MF	SUI	Tyron Owusu
25	GK	SUI	Tim Hottiger
27	FW	SUI	Lars Villiger
29	MF	SUI	Levin Winkler
30	GK	CRO	Karlo Letica
33	GK	SUI	Jérôme Bieler
34	MF	SUI	Demir Xhemalija
46	DF	SUI	Bung Meng Freimann
63	GK	SUI	Raphael Radtke
71	FW	SUI	Sascha Meyer
77	DF	SUI	Erblin Sadikaj
80	MF	SUI	Mio Zimmermann

=== Out on loan ===
Note: Flags indicate national team as defined under FIFA eligibility rules; some limited exceptions apply. Players may hold more than one non-FIFA nationality.

No.	Pos.	Nation	Player
—	GK	SUI	Lionel Huwiler (at Étoile Carouge until 30 June 2027)
—	DF	SWE	Jesper Löfgren (at Kalmar until 31 December 2026)

No.	Pos.	Nation	Player
—	MF	SUI	Ronaldo Dantas Fernandes (at Stade Lausanne Ouchy until 30 June 2027)
—	MF	SUI	Mattia Walker (at Vaduz until 30 June 2027)

=== FC Luzern U21 ===
They compete in the Swiss Promotion League

As of 1 October 2024

Note: Flags indicate national team as defined under FIFA eligibility rules; some limited exceptions apply. Players may hold more than one non-FIFA nationality.

No.	Pos.	Nation	Player
—	GK	GER	Julian Bock
—	GK	POR	João Pedro Da Silva Lopes
—	DF	SUI	Yannis Studer
—	DF	SUI	Bung Hua Freimann
—	DF	SUI	Sonny Henchoz
—	DF	SUI	Haris Kozarac
—	DF	SUI	Noe Theiler
—	DF	SUI	Marijan Urtić
—	DF	SUI	Sven Haag
—	MF	SUI	Bleon Xhemaili
—	MF	SUI	Nathan Wicht
—	MF	SUI	Elia Vogel
—	MF	GER	Hannes Knaak
—	MF	SUI	Timon Näpfer

No.	Pos.	Nation	Player
—	MF	SUI	Damian Cvetkovic
—	MF	SUI	Nemanja Zaric
—	MF	SUI	Mio Zimmermann
—	MF	SUI	Marvin Bieri
—	MF	SUI	Ronaldo Dantas Fernandes
—	FW	SUI	Bung Meng Freimann
—	FW	SUI	Edon Berisha
—	FW	SRB	Dorde Komatovic
—	FW	SUI	Twain Bachmann
—	FW	KOS	Gent Shala
—	FW	SUI	Sascha Meyer
—	FW	SUI	Demis Fiechter
—	FW	SUI	Luuk Breedijk

== Personnel ==
As of 12 August 2026.

=== Current technical staff ===
Name	Function
Jörg Portmann	Head coach
Daniel Gygax	Assistant coach
Claudio Lustenberger	Assistant coach
Lorenzo Bucchi	Goalkeeper coach
Christian Schmidt	Head athletics coach
Fabian Felber	Head medical team
Samuel Figi	Match and video analyst
Remo Meyer	Director of Football

=== Head coaches since 2006 ===
No.	Coach	from	until	days	Points per game
1	(Switzerland) Ciriaco Sforza	1 July 2006	10 August 2008	771	1.15
2	(Switzerland) Jean-Daniel Gross (interim)	11 August 2008	17 August 2008	6	-
3	(Switzerland) Roberto Morinini	17 August 2008	27 October 2008	71	0.88
4	(Switzerland) Rolf Fringer	27 October 2008	2 May 2011	917	1.51
5	(Germany) Christian Brand (interim)	2 May 2011	30 June 2011	59	0.80
6	(Switzerland) Murat Yakin	1 July 2011	19 August 2012	415	1.57
7	(Poland) Ryszard Komornicki	20 August 2012	2 April 2013	225	1.00
8	(Switzerland) Gerardo Seoane (interim)	4 April 2013	8 April 2013	4	-
9	(Argentina) Carlos Bernegger	8 April 2013	6 October 2014	546	1.44
10	(Germany) Markus Babbel	13 October 2014	5 January 2018	1180	1.50
11	(Switzerland) Gerardo Seoane	9 January 2018	1 June 2018	143	2.00
12	(Switzerland) René Weiler	22 June 2018	17 February 2019	231	1.31
13	(Switzerland) Thomas Häberli	21 February 2019	16 December 2019	298	1.36
14	(Switzerland) Fabio Celestini	2 January 2020	22 November 2021	691	1.37
15	(Switzerland) Sandro Chieffo (interim)	22 November 2021	20 December 2021	28	0.25
15	(Liechtenstein) Mario Frick	20 December 2021	18 May 2026	1611	1.43
16	(Switzerland) Jörg Portmann	18 May 2026			

=== Head coaches until 2006 ===
- (Austria) Dionys Schönecker (1921–24)
- (Hungary) Franz Konya (July 1927 – 29 Dec)
- (Austria) Otto Hamacek (Feb 1929 – 29 June)
- (Switzerland) Albert Halter & Albert Mühleisen (1929)
- (Hungary) Karoly "Dragan" Nemes (1930 – 31 September)
- (Wales) Horace Williams (October 1931–33)
- (Switzerland) Josef Gerspach (1933–34)
- (Austria) Karl Heinlein (1934 – November 35)
- (Switzerland) Adolf Vögeli (November 1935–37)
- (Austria) Josef Uridil (1937–38)
- (Austria) Robert Lang (1938)
- (Switzerland) Erwin Moser (1938–39)
- (Hungary) Wilhelm Szigmond (1939)
- (Hungary) Josef Winkler (May 1942–45)
- (Switzerland) Gerhard Walter (Feb 1945 – May 46)
- (Switzerland) Werner Schaer (1946–49)
- (Germany) Fritz Hack (1949–51)
- (Germany) Hermann Stennull (1951–55)
- (Germany) Rudi Gutendorf (1955 – August 61)
- (Switzerland) Josef Brun & (Germany) Josef Weber (September 1961–62)
- (Germany) Franz Linken (April 1962–64)
- (Switzerland) Ernst Wechselberger (1964–69)
- (Hungary) (Chile) Juan Schwanner (1970 – October 70)
- (Switzerland) Werner Schley & (Switzerland) Josef Brun (October 1970–71)
- (Switzerland) Robert Meyer (1971 – September 71)
- (Switzerland) Egon Milder & Josef Vogel (September 1971 – October 71)
- (Switzerland) Josef Brun (October 1971 – November 71)
- (Germany) Albert Sing (31 October 1971 – 30 June 1974)
- (Socialist Federal Republic of Yugoslavia) Ilijas Pašić (1974 – April 75)
- (Switzerland) Paul Wolfisberg & Josef Vogel (April 1975–75)
- (Germany) Otto Luttrop (1975–76)
- (Switzerland) René Hüssy (1976)
- (Germany) Albert Sing (31 December 1976 – 30 June 1978)
- (Switzerland) Paul Wolfisberg & Josef Vogel (July 1978 – June 82)
- (Socialist Federal Republic of Yugoslavia) Milan Nikolić (1982–83)
- (Switzerland) Bruno Rahmen (1983–85)
- (Germany) Friedel Rausch (28 March 1985 – 30 June 1992)
- (Hungary) Bertalan Bicskei (July 1992 – December 93)
- (Germany) Timo Konietzka (December 1993 – June 94)
- (Switzerland) Jean-Paul Brigger (1 July 1994 – 10 March 1997)
- (Switzerland) Kurt Müller (March 1997 – October 97)
- (Switzerland) Martin Müller (November 1997 – September 98)
- (Germany) Egon Coordes (27 September 1998 – 1 November 1998)
- (Switzerland) André "Bigi" Meyer (November 1998 – December 98)
- (Switzerland) Andy Egli (1 January 1999 – 30 June 2001)
- (Poland) Ryszard Komornicki (1 July 2001 – 28 July 2001)
- (Switzerland) Raimondo Ponte (3 August 2001 – 30 June 2002)
- (Switzerland) Bidu Zaugg (1 July 2002 – 30 June 2003)
- (Switzerland) Urs Schönenberger (1 July 2003 – 1 November 2003)
- (Netherlands) René van Eck (1 July 2003 – 30 June 2006)

=== Owners and Leadership ===
Due to licensing requirements, FC Luzern’s professional football operations are consolidated within FC Luzern-Innerschweiz AG, a company that is legally and financially separate from FC Luzern, which retains the club’s non-professional sections.

FC Luzern-Innerschweiz AG is majority-owned by FCL Holding AG, which holds a 71% stake. FCL Holding AG is owned by several entrepreneurs from the region, including Bernhard Alpstaeg (27%), Josef Bieri (17.3%), Samih Sawiris (13%), and Schmid Holding AG (10.5%). The ownership of a further 25% stake in FCL Holding AG is the subject of an ongoing legal dispute between Bernhard Alpstaeg, who claims ownership of the shares and therefore a controlling interest in the holding company, and the holding company’s current Board of Directors.

The remaining shares in FC Luzern-Innerschweiz AG are held by FCL AG solidarisch (16%) and FCL-Basis (10%), a members’ association established by fans which provides supporters with participation and co-determination rights. FC Luzern is the only club in Swiss professional football whose fans are guaranteed direct representation on the club’s Board of Directors. In addition, FCL-Basis holds veto rights over fundamental changes to FC Luzern’s brand identity.
