= Jonathan Bland =

Welsh footballer

Personal information
- Full name: Jonathan Patrick Richard Bland
- Date of birth: 24 October 2005 (age 21)
- Place of birth: Shrewsbury, England
- Height: 1.81 m (5 ft 11 in)
- Position: Midfielder

Team information
- Current team: Barnsley
- Number: 30

Youth career
- 2012–2022: West Bromwich Albion
- 2022–2024: Barnsley

Senior career*
Years	Team	Apps	(Gls)
2024–	Barnsley	63	(0)
2024–2025	→ Peterborough Sports (loan)	22	(0)

International career^{‡}
2019	Wales U15	5	(0)
2021	Wales U16	2	(0)
2023	Wales U19	2	(0)
2025–	Wales U21	7	(0)
- * Club domestic league appearances and goals as of 16:39, 24 October 2026 (UTC) ‡ National team caps and goals as of 17:19, 8 October 2026 (UTC)

Jonathan Patrick Richard Bland (born 24 October 2005) is a professional footballer who plays as a midfielder for EFL League One club Barnsley. He is a Wales Under-21 international.

== Early life ==
Born in Shrewsbury, Shropshire Jonathan Bland qualifies for Wales through his paternal grandparents who hail from Pembrokeshire.

He was educated at Belvidere School, Shrewsbury, and as well as football he played for Shrewsbury Cricket Club and represented Shropshire at cricket up to U14.

== Career ==
After spending nearly 10 years at West Bromwich Albion, Bland joined Barnsley's academy in January 2022.

In his first full season at the club he was named Academy Player of the Season, captained the U18s to their first ever Professional Development League title and made his international debut for Wales U19s against Sweden.

He made his senior debut in the EFL Trophy against Manchester City EDS at Oakwell on 26 September 2023, coming on as a 68th-minute substitute. He made his first senior start in the same competition the following season, against Manchester United U21s at Oakwell on 20 August 2024.

Bland signed a Professional contract with Barnsley in January 2024.

In November 2024, he signed a short term loan deal with National League North side Peterborough Sports until 1 January 2025, which was subsequently extended until the end of the 2024–25 season.

In February 2025, Bland was recalled from loan returning to Barnsley making his EFL League One debut in the 1–1 home draw with Cambridge United on 22 March, coming on as a 19th minute substitute. The following week he made his first league start in another 1–1 draw, away at Wigan Athletic.

At the end of the 2024–25 season he was named Barnsley's Young Player of the Year along with fellow Academy Graduates Kieren Flavell & Fabio Jalo.

== International career ==
He has represented Wales at U15, U16 & U18 levels. On 6 June 2025 Bland made his Wales under-21 debut, coming on as a 63rd minute substitute in a friendly match against Norway.

== Career statistics ==
As of match played 24 October 2026

Appearances and goals by club, season and competition
Club	Season	League			FA Cup		League Cup		Other		Total	
Club	Season	Division	Apps	Goals	Apps	Goals	Apps	Goals	Apps	Goals	Apps	Goals
Barnsley	2023–24	EFL League One	0	0	0	0	0	0	1 (Note: Appearance(s) in EFL Trophy)	0	1	0
Barnsley	2024–25	EFL League One	9	0	0	0	0	0	3	0	12	0
Barnsley	2025–26	EFL League One	45	0	3	0	3	0	2	0	53	0
Barnsley	2026–27	EFL League One	9	0	0	0	2	0	1	0	12	0
Total			63	0	3	0	5	0	7	0	78	0
Peterborough Sports (loan)	2024–25	National League North	22	0	0	0	–		2 (Note: Appearances in FA Trophy)	0	24	0
Career total			85	0	3	0	5	0	9	0	102	0
