= Kieren Flavell =

English footballer (born 2003)

Personal information
- Full name: Kieren James Flavell
- Date of birth: 21 September 2003 (age 23)
- Place of birth: Pontefract, England
- Height: 1.97 m (6 ft 6 in)
- Position: Goalkeeper

Team information
- Current team: Barnsley
- Number: 51

Youth career
- 2011–2024: Barnsley

Senior career*
Years	Team	Apps	(Gls)
2024–	Barnsley	10	(0)
2024	→ Bradford (Park Avenue) (loan)	9	(0)
2024	→ Farsley Celtic (loan)	11	(0)
- * Club domestic league appearances and goals as of 14:05, 29 March 2025 (UTC)

Kieren James Flavell (born 21 September 2003) is an English professional footballer who plays as a goalkeeper for EFL League One club Barnsley.

== Career ==
Having joined Barnsley at the age of eight, Flavell overcame two serious knee injuries that ruled him out for over a year, signing a new contract in January 2024. Shortly after signing this deal, he joined Northern Premier League Premier Division side Bradford (Park Avenue) on an initial one-month loan, later extended until the end of the season.

On 29 October 2024, Flavell made his senior debut for Barnsley, playing the duration of a 3–1 EFL Trophy defeat to Doncaster Rovers. The following week, he joined National League North side Farsley Celtic on loan.

On 15 March 2025, Flavell made his league debut for the Tykes after starting goalkeeper Jackson Smith suffered an injury in the opening fifteen minutes of an eventual 2–1 defeat to Mansfield Town. With interim manager Conor Hourihane opting against bringing in an emergency loan, Flavell was trusted to start the following fixture, speaking of his desire to establish himself as the club's first-choice goalkeeper before the end of the season.

On 29 May 2025, the club said the player had signed a new two-year contract.

== Career statistics ==
As of match played 22 September 2026

Appearances and goals by club, season and competition
Club	Season	League			FA Cup		League Cup		Other		Total	
Club	Season	Division	Apps	Goals	Apps	Goals	Apps	Goals	Apps	Goals	Apps	Goals
Barnsley	2023–24	League One	0	0	0	0	0	0	0	0	0	0
Barnsley	2024–25	League One	7	0	0	0	0	0	1 (Note: Appearance(s) in EFL Trophy)	0	8	0
Barnsley	2025–26	League One	3	0	0	0	0	0	3	0	6	0
Barnsley	2026–27	League One	0	0	0	0	1	0	1	0	2	0
Barnsley	Total		10	0	0	0	1	0	5	0	16	0
Bradford (Park Avenue) (loan)	2023–24	NPL Premier Division	9	0	—		—		0	0	9	0
Farsley Celtic (loan)	2024–25	National League North	11	0	0	0	—		2 (Note: Appearance(s) in FA Trophy)	0	13	0
Career total			22	0	0	0	0	0	3	0	25	0
