= 2025–26 Barnsley F.C. season =

139th season in existence of Barnsley FC

Barnsley
2025–26 season
- Owner: BFC Investment Company Ltd
- Chairman: Neerav Parekh
- Head coach: Conor Hourihane
- Stadium: Oakwell
- League One: 15th
- FA Cup: Third round
- EFL Cup: Third round
- EFL Trophy: Round of 32
- Top goalscorer: League: David McGoldrick (15); All: David McGoldrick (18)
- Highest home attendance: 15,783 v Huddersfield Town (30 Aug 2025, League One)
- Lowest home attendance: 1,202 v Lincoln City (11 Nov 2025, EFL Trophy)
- Average home league attendance: 11,144
- Biggest win: 5–0 v Luton Town (Home, 22 Nov 2025, League One)
- Biggest defeat: 0–6 v Brighton & Hove Albion (Home, 23 Sept 2025, EFL Cup)

The 2025–26 season was the 139th season in the history of Barnsley Football Club and their fourth consecutive season in League One. In addition to the domestic league, the club also participated in the FA Cup, the EFL Cup, and the EFL Trophy.

== Transfers and contracts ==
=== In ===
Date	Pos.	Player	From	Fee	Ref.
30 June 2025	CF	(England) Reyes Cleary	(England) West Bromwich Albion	Undisclosed	
9 July 2025	CF	(Republic of Ireland) David McGoldrick	(England) Notts County	Free	
15 July 2025	LW	(England) Aston Ellard	(England) Coventry City	Free	
15 July 2025	CB	(England) Ben Jordison	(England) Burnley	Free	
15 July 2025	RB	(England) Kingston Simbai	(England) Norwich City	Free	
15 July 2025	CM	(England) Nathan Willis	(England) Blackburn Rovers	Free	
28 July 2025	DM	(Northern Ireland) Patrick Kelly	(England) West Ham United	Free transfer	
8 August 2025	RB	(England) Tennai Watson	(England) Charlton Athletic	Free	
18 August 2025	CF	(England) Lewis Gould	(England) Crawley Down Gatwick	Free	
18 August 2025	CM	(England) Voldi Mbaya	(England) Sheffield Wednesday	Free	
12 September 2025	CB	(England) Stan Holder	(England) AFC Fylde	Free transfer	
6 January 2026	CB	(Republic of Ireland) Eoghan O'Connell	(Wales) Wrexham	Free	
17 January 2026	LW	(England) Charlie Lennon	(England) Middlesbrough	Undisclosed	

=== Out ===
Date	Pos.	Player	To	Fee	Ref.
25 July 2025	RB	(England) Kyran Lofthouse	(England) Burton Albion	Undisclosed	
2 January 2026	LB	(Northern Ireland) Bayley McCann	(England) Doncaster Rovers	Undisclosed	
14 January 2026	LM	(Republic of Ireland) Neil Farrugia	(Scotland) Dundee United	Undisclosed	
2 February 2026	CF	(England) Davis Keillor-Dunn	(Wales) Wrexham	Undisclosed	

=== Loaned in ===
Date	Pos.	Player	From	Date until	Ref.
23 June 2025	GK	(England) Murphy Cooper	(England) Queens Park Rangers	14 January 2026 (Note: On 14 January, Cooper's initial season-long loan from Queens Park Rangers was terminated)	
26 June 2025	LB	(England) Nathanael Ogbeta	(England) Plymouth Argyle	31 May 2026	
21 July 2025	CAM	(England) Caylan Vickers	(England) Brighton & Hove Albion	9 January 2026 (Note: On 9 January, Vickers' season-long loan from Brighton & Hove Albion was terminated)	
1 September 2025	CB	(England) Jake Rooney	(England) Derby County	1 January 2026 (Note: On 1 January, Rooney was recalled to his parent club Derby)	
15 January 2026	GK	(Canada) Owen Goodman	(England) Crystal Palace	31 May 2026	
26 January 2026	RW	(Scotland) Scott Banks	(Germany) St Pauli	31 May 2026	
30 January 2026	CAM	(Zimbabwe) Tawanda Chirewa	(England) Wolverhampton Wanderers	31 May 2026	
2 February 2026	CF	(Wales) Tom Bradshaw	(England) Oxford United	31 May 2026	
6 February 2026	DM	(China) Xu Bin (Note: Under-21 signing)	(England) Wolverhampton Wanderers	31 May 2026	
24 February 2026	CB	(England) Isaac Smith	(England) Manchester City	31 May 2026	

=== Loaned out ===
Date	Pos.	Player	To	Date until	Ref.
4 July 2025	RB	(Republic of Ireland) Barry Cotter	(England) Notts County	31 May 2026	
18 July 2025	RB	(Republic of Ireland) Corey O'Keeffe	(England) Stockport County	5 January 2026 (Note: On 5 January, O'Keeffe was recalled from his season-long at Stockport)	
18 July 2025	CF	(England) Max Watters	(Scotland) Dundee United	31 May 2026	
8 August 2025	CF	(Scotland) Andrew Dallas	(England) Southend United	31 May 2026	
13 August 2025	LB	(Northern Ireland) Bayley McCann	(England) Peterborough Sports	30 October 2025 (Note: On 30 October, McCann was recalled from his loan at Peterborough Sports and subsequently joined Alfreton on loan)	
14 August 2025	CB	(Poland) Kacper Łopata	(England) Bristol Rovers	6 January 2026 (Note: On 6 January, Łopata's season-long loan at Bristol Rovers was terminated)	
29 August 2025	GK	(England) Rogan Ravenhill	(England) Leamington	26 September 2025	
4 October 2025	CB	(Republic of Ireland) Connor Barratt	(England) Kidderminster Harriers	30 October 2025	
10 October 2025	CF	(England) Leo Farrell	(England) Guiseley	3 January 2026	
10 October 2025	GK	(England) Jackson Smith	(England) Rochdale	17 October 2025	
30 October 2025	LB	(Northern Ireland) Bayley McCann	(England) Alfreton Town	3 January 2026	
7 November 2025	CB	(Republic of Ireland) Connor Barratt	(England) Bedford Town	5 December 2025	
20 December 2025	GK	(England) Jackson Smith	(England) Grimsby Town	31 May 2026 (Note: On 27 December, Smith's loan at Grimsby was extended by a further seven days. Then on 8 January, it was extended again until the end of the season)	
8 January 2026	CM	(Jamaica) Jon Russell	(England) Mansfield Town	31 May 2026	
15 January 2026	CB	(Poland) Kacper Łopata	(England) Walsall	31 May 2026	
30 January 2026	LW	(Portugal) Fábio Jaló	(England) Oldham Athletic	31 May 2026	
3 February 2026	CB	(Republic of Ireland) Connor Barratt	(Republic of Ireland) Galway United	30 June 2026	
20 February 2026	GK	(England) Rogan Ravenhill	(England) Macclesfield	31 May 2026	
21 February 2026	CF	(England) Luke Alker	(England) Alfreton Town	21 March 2026	
28 February 2026	CF	(England) Leo Farrell	(England) Scunthorpe United	28 March 2026	
27 March 2026	LW	(Malta) Aston Ellard	(England) Horsham	31 April 2026	
27 March 2026	CF	(England) Lewis Gould	(England) Horsham	31 April 2026	

=== Released / Out of Contract ===
Date	Pos.	Player	Subsequent club	Join date	Ref.
30 June 2025	CF	(England) Stephen Humphrys	(England) Bradford City	1 July 2025	
30 June 2025	CM	(England) Jean Claude Makiessi	(England) Emley	1 July 2025	
30 June 2025	CB	(Republic of Ireland) Conor McCarthy	(England) Northampton Town	1 July 2025	
30 June 2025	CF	(England) Emmaisa Nzondo	(England) Emley	1 July 2025	
30 June 2025	CB	(Thailand) Nathan James	(Thailand) BG Pathum United	3 July 2025	
30 June 2025	CM	(England) Callum West	(Wales) Connah's Quay Nomads	3 July 2025	
30 June 2025	CM	(England) Josh Benson	(England) Rotherham United	21 July 2025	
30 June 2025	CB	(United States) Donovan Pines	(Austria) Grazer	5 August 2025	
30 June 2025	CF	(Montserrat) Josiah Dyer	(England) Peterborough Sports	6 August 2025	
30 June 2025	CM	(England) Charlie Hickingbottom	(England) Peterborough Sports	6 August 2025	
30 June 2025	GK	(England) Adam Hayton	(England) Bishop's Stortford	7 August 2025	
30 June 2025	CF	(England) Sam Cosgrove	(New Zealand) Auckland	19 August 2025	
30 June 2025	CAM	(England) Theo Chapman	(England) Scarborough Athletic	18 September 2025	
30 June 2025	CF	(England) Aiden Marsh	(England) Truro City	26 September 2025	
30 June 2025	LW	(United States) Jonathan Lewis	(United States) Lexington SC	3 March 2026	
30 June 2025	LB	(England) Hayden Pickard			
23 February 2026	RB	(Republic of Ireland) Barry Cotter	(Republic of Ireland) Derry City	23 February 2026	

=== New Contract ===
Date	Pos.	Player	Contract until	Ref.
29 May 2025	GK	(England) Kieren Flavell	30 June 2027 (Note: Club option for a further year)	
30 May 2025	CM	(Wales) Jonathan Bland	30 June 2028	
23 June 2025	CB	(Republic of Ireland) Connor Barratt	30 June 2027	
15 July 2025	CM	(England) Aaron Atkinson	Undisclosed	
15 July 2025	CM	(England) Kieran Graham	Undisclosed	
15 July 2025	RB	(England) Ziggy Kozluk	Undisclosed	
15 July 2025	LB	(Northern Ireland) Bayley McCann	Undisclosed	
20 February 2026	GK	(England) Rogan Ravenhill	30 June 2029	

== Pre-season and friendlies ==
On 4 June, Barnsley announced their pre-season schedule, with frienlies against Emley, Worksop Town, Alfreton Town, Harrogate Town and York City.

Win Draw Loss Fixtures

1 July 2025 Friendly	Emley	0–3	Barnsley	Emley
19:00 BST		Report	Keillor-Dunn 16'; Woodcock 37'; Farrugia 79'	Stadium: Welfare Ground; Attendance: 1,546

5 July 2025 Friendly	Worksop Town	1–1	Barnsley	Worksop
15:00 BST	Starcenko 63'	Report	Keillor-Dunn 80'	Stadium: Sandy Lane

8 July 2025 Friendly	Buxton	3–1	Barnsley XI	Buxton
19:00 BST	Kirby 14'; Johnston 51'; Campbell 86'	Report	Graham 37'	Stadium: The Silverlands

12 July 2025 Friendly	Barnsley	1–1	Rangers	Harrogate
12:00 BST	Watters	Report	Danilo	Stadium: Wetherby Road; Attendance: 0 (behind-closed-doors)

19 July 2025 Friendly	Harrogate Town	0–3	Barnsley	Harrogate
15:00 BST		Report	Shepherd 8'; McGoldrick 44'; Yoganathan 86'	Stadium: Wetherby Road

22 July 2025 Friendly	York City	2–2	Barnsley	Huntington
19:00 BST	Banks 6'; Pearce 71'	Report	Vickers 55'; Phillips 75'	Stadium: York Community Stadium

== Competitions ==
=== League One ===
==== League table ====
Pos	Team	Pld	W	D	L	GF	GA	GD	Pts
13	Blackpool	46	17	9	20	54	65	−11	60
14	Doncaster Rovers	46	17	9	20	50	69	−19	60
15	Barnsley	46	15	14	17	68	73	−5	59
16	Wigan Athletic	46	14	14	18	49	58	−9	56
17	Burton Albion	46	13	15	18	50	60	−10	54

Source: EFL Official Website
Rules for classification: 1) Points; 2) Goal difference; 3) Number of goals scored; 4) Head-to-head results; 5) Wins; 6) Away goals; 7) Penalty points (sec 9.5); 8) 12-point sending off offences

==== Results summary ====
Overall								Home						Away					
Pld	W	D	L	GF	GA	GD	Pts	W	D	L	GF	GA	GD	W	D	L	GF	GA	GD
45	15	14	16	67	70	−3	59	9	6	7	38	34	+4	6	8	9	29	36	−7

Last updated: 28 April 2026.
Source: Soccerway

==== Matches ====
On 26 June, the League One fixtures were revealed, with Barnsley visiting Plymouth Argyle on the opening weekend.

Win Draw Loss Fixtures

2 August 2025 1	Plymouth Argyle	1–3	Barnsley	Plymouth
15:00 BST	Sarpong-Wiredu (yellow card) 45+4'; Ibrahim (yellow card) 45+4'; Watts 50'	Report	Sarpong-Wiredu 13' (o.g.); Phillips 30'; McGoldrick (yellow card) 35'; Shepherd (yellow card) 45+4' (yellow-red card) 63'; Bland (yellow card) 49'; Russell (yellow card) 70'; Keillor-Dunn 86'	Stadium: Home Park; Attendance: 16,483; Referee: Declan Bourne

9 August 2025 2	Barnsley	3–2	Burton Albion	Barnsley
15:00 BST	Earl (yellow card) 45+3'; Vickers 55'; Keillor-Dunn 63'; Kelly (yellow card) 86'; McGoldrick 90+3'	Report	Beesley 4' (pen.); Tavares 35'; McKiernan (yellow card) 82'	Stadium: Oakwell; Attendance: 12,456; Referee: David Rock

16 August 2025 3	Barnsley	1–1	Bolton Wanderers	Barnsley
15:00 BST	Yoganathan (yellow card) 34' (yellow-red card) 52'; McGoldrick 47'; Farrugia (yellow card) 90+7'; Cooper (yellow card) 90+8'	Report	Burstow (yellow card) 34'; McAtee 86'; Morley (yellow card) 90+4'	Stadium: Oakwell; Referee: Leigh Doughty

19 August 2025 4	Peterborough United	0–1	Barnsley	Peterborough
19:45 BST	Frith (yellow card) 90+2'	Report	Vickers 44'; Watson (yellow card) 58'; Earl (yellow card) 68'; Cleary (yellow card) 90+7'	Stadium: London Road Stadium; Attendance: 7,148; Referee: Scott Jackson

23 August 2025 5	AFC Wimbledon	2–0	Barnsley	Wimbledon
15:00 BST	Ogundere (yellow card) 8'; Stevens 29'; Seddon (yellow card) 50'; Hackford 70'	Report	Earl (yellow card) 47'	Stadium: Plough Lane; Attendance: 8,361; Referee: Oliver Yates

30 August 2025 6	Barnsley	3–1	Huddersfield Town	Barnsley
15:00 BST	Keillor-Dunn 9' 85'; Connell (yellow card) 39' (goal) 44'	Report	Harness (yellow card) 15'; Goodman (red card) 36'; Taylor (yellow card) 68' (goal) 87'	Stadium: Oakwell; Attendance: 15,783; Referee: Edward Duckworth

13 September 2025 8	Barnsley	3–2	Reading	Barnsley
15:00 BST	Earl 9'; Keillor-Dunn (yellow card) 37', (goal) 55'; Phillips 59' (pen.); Connell (yellow card) 88'; Cooper (yellow card) 90+6'	Report	Jacob (yellow card) 22'; Marriott 35'; Savage (yellow card) 38'; Ahmed (yellow card) 45+2'; Kyerewaa 66', (yellow card) 70'; Burns (yellow card) 76'	Stadium: Oakwell; Attendance: 10,803; Referee: Elliot Bell

20 September 2025 9	Blackpool	1–0	Barnsley	Blackpool
12:30 BST	Morgan (yellow card) 90+6'; Brown 90+8', (yellow card) 90+9'		Bland (yellow card) 53'	Stadium: Bloomfield Road; Referee: Martin Coy
Note: Fixture was originally scheduled for a 15:00 kick-off, but was moved live Sky Sports broadcasting.

27 September 2025 10	Barnsley	0–2	Port Vale	Barnsley
15:00 BST	Bland (yellow card) 63'	Report	Shipley (yellow card) 35'; Lawrence-Gabriel 65', (yellow card) 81'; Croasdale 89'	Stadium: Oakwell; Attendance: 10,688; Referee: James Linington

4 October 2025 11	Wycombe Wanderers	2–2	Barnsley	High Wycombe
12:30 BST	Woodrow (yellow card) 74'; Bell 88'; Lowry 90+3'	Report	Cleary 25'; Cooper (yellow card) 43'; Keillor-Dunn 50'; Bland (yellow card) 65'	Stadium: Adams Park; Referee: Ross Joyce
Note: Fixture was originally scheduled for a 15:00 kick-off, but was rescheduled for live Sky Sports broadcasting.

18 October 2025 13	Bradford City	2–2	Barnsley	Bradford
15:00 BST	Sarcevic 9'; Humphrys 45+4'	Report	Cleary 24'; Ogbeta (yellow card) 45+3'; Kelly 64'	Stadium: Valley Parade; Attendance: 22,228; Referee: Andrew Humphries

25 October 2025 14	Barnsley	0–1	Rotherham United	Barnsley
15:00 BST	Roberts (yellow card) 14'; Shepherd (yellow card) 45+2'; Kelly (yellow card) 55'; Connell (yellow card) 63'	Report	Spence 64'	Stadium: Oakwell; Attendance: 12,468; Referee: Benjamin Speedie

8 November 2025 15	Doncaster Rovers	1–2	Barnsley	Doncaster
15:00 GMT	Molyneux 38'; Nixon (yellow card) 90+5'	Report	Yoganathan 33', (yellow card) 55'; Keillor-Dunn 68'; Roberts (yellow card) 75'; Connell (yellow card) 88'	Stadium: Eco-Power Stadium; Attendance: 11,415; Referee: Darren Drysdale

22 November 2025 17	Barnsley	5–0	Luton Town	Barnsley
15:00 GMT	Cleary 7', (yellow card) 39'; Kelly 35'; Connell 45'; Kodua 62' (o.g.); Bland (yellow card) 62'; Keillor-Dunn 75'	Report	Saville (yellow card) 16'; Walsh (yellow card) 43'	Stadium: Oakwell; Attendance: 10,882; Referee: Thomas Parsons

29 November 2025 18	Stockport County	1–1	Barnsley	Edgeley
12:30 GMT	Connolly 89'	Report	Yoganathan 27'; Connell (yellow card) 30'	Stadium: Edgeley Park; Attendance: 9,861; Referee: Criag Hicks
Note: Fixture was originally scheduled for a 15:00 kick-off, but was rescheduled for live Sky Sports broadcasting.

9 December 2025 19	Lincoln City	3–1	Barnsley	Lincoln
19:45 GMT	Hackett-Fairchild 36', 71'; Bayliss 68'	Report	Connell (yellow card) 33'; Keillor-Dunn 67'	Stadium: Sincil Bank; Attendance: 7,768; Referee: Dale Baines

13 December 2025 20	Barnsley	3–2	Leyton Orient	Barnsley
15:00 GMT	Cleary 10'; Cooper (yellow card) 27'; Russell 77'; Keillor-Dunn 85'	Report	Ballard 30' (pen.); O'Neill 38', (yellow card) 44'; Craig (yellow card) 51'; Bakinson (yellow card) 76'	Stadium: Oakwell; Attendance: 10,232; Referee: Simon Mather

20 December 2025 21	Exeter City	3–0	Barnsley	Exeter
15:00 GMT	Niskanen 41'; Sweeney (yellow card) 45+2'; Wareham 61'; Cole 73'	Report	Kelly (yellow card) 54'; Keillor-Dunn (yellow card) 77'	Stadium: St James Park; Attendance: 6,471; Referee: Ben Atkinson

26 December 2025 22	Barnsley	2–3	Mansfield Town	Barnsley
15:00 GMT	Cleary 2'; Keillor-Dunn 13'	Report	Reed 25' (pen.); Hewitt (yellow card) 33'; McLaughlin 58', (yellow card) 71'; Lewis 83'; Cargill (yellow card) 90'; Moriah-Welsh (yellow card) 90+2'	Stadium: Oakwell; Attendance: 12,856; Referee: Martin Coy

29 December 2025 23	Barnsley	0–2	Lincoln City	Barnsley
19:45 GMT	Earl (yellow card) 18'; Bland (yellow card) 56'; Connell (yellow card) 82'; Kelly (yellow card) 86'	Report	Hamer 8'. (yellow card) 86'; Reach 72'; McGrandles (yellow card) 86'	Stadium: Oakwell; Attendance: 10,711; Referee: Paul Howard

1 January 2026 24	Wigan Athletic	1–1	Barnsley	Wigan
15:00 GMT	Costelloe 6'; Aimson (yellow card) 85'	Report	Phillips 69'; Connell (red card) 84'	Stadium: Brick Community Stadium; Attendance: 9,079; Referee: Benjamin Speedie

17 January 2026 27	Barnsley	2–1	Blackpool	Barnsley
15:00 GMT	Bland (yellow card) 17'; McGoldrick 27', 90+3'; Phillips (yellow card) 83'	Report	Ashworth (yellow card) 36'; Honeyman (yellow card) 53'; Fletcher 74'	Stadium: Oakwell; Attendance: 10,266; Referee: Andrew Humphries

24 January 2026 28	Reading	2–2	Barnsley	Reading
15:00 GMT	Roberts 32'; Marriott 84'	Report	Shepherd (yellow card) 19'; McGoldrick 38'; O'Keeffe (yellow card) 57'; Phillips 67'; Keillor-Dunn (yellow card) 84'	Stadium: Madejski Stadium; Attendance: 12,101; Referee: Leigh Doughty

27 January 2026 29	Cardiff City	4–0	Barnsley	Leckwith
19:45 GMT	Ng 3'; Robertson (yellow card) 5'; Willock 45+1', 69'; Kellyman 63'	Report	O'Connell (yellow card) 17'; O'Keeffe (yellow card) 87'	Stadium: Cardiff City Stadium; Attendance: 17,841; Referee: Lee Swabey

31 January 2026 30	Barnsley	3–1	Stevenage	Barnsley
15:00 GMT	Watson (yellow card) 7'; McGoldrick 14'; Keillor-Dunn 31', 48'; Shepherd (yellow card) 65'; Goodman (yellow card) 66'	Report	Kemp 37'; Cornick (yellow card) 65'; Lubala (yellow card) 66'	Stadium: Oakwell; Attendance: 9,823; Referee: Seb Stockbridge

3 February 2026 16	Barnsley	2–2	Northampton Town	Barnsley
19:45 GMT	Shepherd (yellow card) 4'; McGoldrick 30'; Phillips 62'; Kelly (yellow card) 90+5'	Report	Guinness-Walker 3'; McGeehan (yellow card) 58'; Dyche 71'	Stadium: Oakwell; Attendance: 8,806; Referee: Thomas Parsons
Note: Fixture was originally scheduled for 15 November, but was postponed due to international call-ups.

7 February 2026 31	Bolton Wanderers	3–2	Barnsley	Horwich
15:00 GMT	Dalby 5', 19'; Dempsey (yellow card) 29'; McAtee 32'; Forino-Joseph (yellow card) 45+2'; Johnston (yellow card) 77'	Report	Connell 57'; Phillips 60'; Bland (yellow card) 79'; Shepherd (yellow card) 88'	Stadium: Toughsheet Community Stadium; Attendance: 21,415; Referee: Scott Oldham

14 February 2026 32	Barnsley	3–3	AFC Wimbledon	Barnsley
15:00 GMT	McGoldrick 10'; Bradshaw 14'; O'Keeffe (yellow card) 31'; Bland (yellow card) 62'; Banks 87'	Report	Bugiel 25', 27'; Browne 74'	Stadium: Oakwell; Attendance: 9,640; Referee: Charles Breakspear

17 February 2026 33	Barnsley	2–1	Peterborough United	Barnsley
19:45 GMT	Connell 34', (yellow card) 83'; Cleary 53'; Phillips (yellow card) 59'	Report	Lisbie 21'; Johnston (yellow card) 74'	Stadium: Oakwell; Attendance: 9,257; Referee: Zac Kennard-Kettle

21 February 2026 34	Huddersfield Town	2–1	Barnsley	Huddersfield
15:00 GMT	Ledson (yellow card) 46', (goal) 57'; Hardie 74'	Report	Gent (yellow card) 6'; McGoldrick 42'; O'Keeffe (yellow card) 90+5'	Stadium: Kirklees Stadium; Referee: Peter Wright

28 February 2026 35	Leyton Orient	1–3	Barnsley	Leyton
12:30 GMT	Levitt 20'; Abdulai (yellow card) 90+3'	Report	McGoldrick 10', 53', 62'; Phillips (yellow card) 49'	Stadium: Brisbane Road; Attendance: 8,313; Referee: Carl Brook
Note: Fixture was initially scheduled for a 15:00 kick-off, but was rescheduled for live Sky Sports broadcasting.

3 March 2026 26	Barnsley	0–1	Wycombe Wanderers	Barnsley
19:45 GMT	O'Connell (yellow card) 61'; Yoganathan (yellow card) 86'; Connell (yellow card) 90+3'	Report	Morley 59'; Casey (yellow card) 72'; Norris (yellow card) 82'; Mullins (yellow card) 87'	Stadium: Oakwell; Attendance: 8,608; Referee: Ollie Yates
Note: Fixture was originally scheduled for 10 January, but was postponed due to FA Cup involvement.

7 March 2026 36	Barnsley	2–1	Exeter City	Barnsley
15:00 GMT	McGoldrick 8'; Yoganathan 16'; Shepherd (yellow card) 29'	Report	Rydel (yellow card) 23'; Wareham 75'	Stadium: Oakwell; Attendance: 9,706; Referee: Ross Joyce

10 March 2025 12	Barnsley	1–1	Cardiff City	Barnsley
19:45 GMT	Banks 22'	Report	Colwill 11'; Lawlor (yellow card) 43'	Stadium: Oakwell; Attendance: 9,677; Referee: Will Finnie
Note: Fixture was originally scheduled for 11 October, but was postponed due to international call-ups.

14 March 2026 37	Mansfield Town	2–2	Barnsley	Mansfield
15:00 GMT	Akins 57' (pen.); McLaughlin 90+4'	Report	de Gevigney (yellow card) 7'; McGoldrick 19'; O'Keeffe (yellow card) 27'; Banks 49'; Kelly (yellow card) 68'	Stadium: Field Mill; Attendance: 8,538; Referee: Martin Woods

17 March 2026 38	Barnsley	1–1	Wigan Athletic	Barnsley
20:00 GMT	de Gevigney (yellow card) 45+1'; Yoganathan (yellow card) 50'; Connell (yellow card) 75'; Lennon 90+6'	Report	Taylor 29'; Wright (yellow card) 56' (yellow-red card) 88'; Moxon (yellow card) 57'	Stadium: Oakwell; Referee: Ross Martin
Note: Fixture was initially scheduled for a 19:45 kick-off, but was pushed back for Sky Sports broadcasting.

21 March 2026 39	Barnsley	0–1	Doncaster Rovers	Barnsley
15:00 GMT	O'Keeffe (yellow card) 64'; Watson (yellow card) 74'	Report	Gotts (yellow card) 54'; Lee 65' (pen.); Lo-Tutala (yellow card) 74'	Stadium: Oakwell; Attendance: 13,026; Referee: David Rock

3 April 2026 41	Burton Albion	1–1	Barnsley	Burton upon Trent
15:00 BST	Webster 60'; Hartridge (yellow card) 76'	Report	Connell (yellow card) 11'; Farrell (yellow card) 86'; McGoldrick 90'; Roberts (yellow card) 90+5'	Stadium: Pirelli Stadium; Attendance: 4,203; Referee: Kirsty Dowle

6 April 2026 42	Barnsley	0–3	Plymouth Argyle	Barnsley
15:00 BST	Shepherd (yellow card) 78'	Report	Ross (yellow card) 10'; Oseni 16', 79' (pen.); Tolaj 57'	Stadium: Oakwell; Attendance: 10,722; Referee: Tom Reeves

11 April 2026 43	Rotherham United	1–3	Barnsley	Rotherham
15:00 BST	Nombe 90+5' (pen.)	Report	O'Keeffe (yellow card) 20'; Phillips 37'; Yoganathan (yellow card) 50'; Bradshaw 64', 74'; de Gevigney (yellow card) 88'; O'Connell (yellow card) 90+4'	Stadium: New York Stadium; Attendance: 9,575; Referee: Lee Swabey

14 April 2026 25	Port Vale	0–0	Barnsley	Burslem
19:45 BST	Humphreys (yellow card) 20'	Report	Phillips (penalty missed) 62'; Earl (yellow card) 74'	Stadium: Vale Park; Attendance: 4,863; Referee: Oliver Mackey
Note: Fixture was originally scheduled for 4 January, but it was postponed due to a frozen pitch.

18 April 2026 44	Barnsley	2–2	Bradford City	Barnsley
12:30 BST	Yoganathan (red card) 8'; O'Connell 50'; Bland (yellow card) 71'; Cleary (yellow card) 76'; Farrell 90+6'	Report	Swan (yellow card) 33'; Touray (yellow card) 55'; Metcalfe (yellow card) 65'; Powell 73'; Roberts 82' (o.g.)	Stadium: Oakwell; Attendance: 14,906; Referee: Charles Breakspear
Note: Fixture was initially scheduled for a 15:00 kick-off, but was brought forward for Sky Sports broadcasting.

21 April 2026 7	Stevenage	1–0	Barnsley	Stevenage
19:45 BST	Kemp 22'	Report		Stadium: Broadhall Way; Attendance: 3,620; Referee: Benjamin Speedie
Note: Fixture was originally scheduled for 6 September, but was postponed due to international call-ups in both squads. It was then postponed again on 10 February, due to a waterlogged pitch.

25 April 2026 45	Luton Town	2–1	Barnsley	Luton
15:00 BST				Stadium: Kenilworth Road; Attendance: 11,781

28 April 2026 40	Northampton Town	0–1	Barnsley	Northampton
19:45 BST	List (yellow card) 87'	Report	Cleary 37'; O'Keeffe (yellow card) 55'	Stadium: Sixfields Stadium; Attendance: 5,143; Referee: Jamie O'Connor
Note: Fixture was initially scheduled for 28 March, but was rearranged due to international call-ups.

=== FA Cup ===
Barnsley were drawn at home to York City in the first round, and away to Peterborough United in the second round and to Liverpool in the third round.

Win Draw Loss Fixtures

1 November 2025 First round	Barnsley	3–2	York City	Barnsley
15:00 GMT	Keillor-Dunn 30', 77'; Roberts (yellow card) 55', (goal) 90+1'	Report	Stones 23'; Pearce (yellow card) 36'; Banks (yellow card) 80'; Kitching 87'	Stadium: Oakwell; Attendance: 5,953; Referee: Michael Barlow

6 December 2025 Secon round	Peterborough United	0–1	Barnsley	Peterborough
15:00 GMT	Garbett 63'; Okagbue (yellow card) 90+4'	Report	Jaló (yellow card) 25'; Phillips (yellow card) 27'; de Gevigney (yellow card) 48'; Kelly 73', (yellow card) 90+4'; Connell (yellow card) 90+2'	Stadium: London Road Stadium; Attendance: 4,157; Referee: Alan Young

12 January 2026 Third round	Liverpool	4–1	Barnsley	Liverpool
19:45 GMT	Szoboszlai 9'; Gomez (yellow card) 32'; Frimpong 36'; Wirtz 84'; Ekitike 90+4'	Report	Phillips 40'	Stadium: Anfield; Attendance: 60,206; Referee: Farai Hallam

=== EFL Cup ===
Barnsley were drawn at home to Fleetwood Town in the first round, Rotherham United in the second round and to Brighton & Hove Albion in the third round.

Win Draw Loss Fixtures

13 August 2025 First round	Barnsley	2–2 (5–4 p)	Fleetwood Town	Barnsley
19:45 BST	Russell 15'; Mullarkey 59' (o.g.); Cooper (yellow card) 90+8'	Report	Mullarkey 45+1'; Devonport 90+4'	Stadium: Oakwell; Attendance: 3,259; Referee: Carl Brook

26 August 2025 Second round	Barnsley	2–1	Rotherham United	Barnsley
19:45 BST	Bland (yellow card) 58'; Russell 59'; Phillips 68', (yellow card) 78'	Report	Martha 19', (yellow card) 44'; Dawson (yellow card) 69'	Stadium: Oakwell; Attendance: 5,803; Referee: Matt Corlett

23 September 2025 Third round	Barnsley	0–6	Brighton & Hove Albion	Barnsley
19:45 BST		Report	Gómez 9', 21', 33', 68'; Kadıoğlu (yellow card) 37'; Baleba (yellow card) 46'; Tzimas (yellow card) 63'; Howell 87'; Ayari 89'	Stadium: Oakwell; Attendance: 7,790 (1,437 Albion fans); Referee: Tom Reeves

=== EFL Trophy ===
Barnsley were drawn against Lincoln City, Notts County and Manchester United U21 in the group stage. After finishing second in the group, they were then drawn away to Port Vale in the round of 32.

Pos	Div	Team	Pld	W	PW	PL	L	GF	GA	GD	Pts	Qualification
1	L1	Lincoln City	3	3	0	0	0	8	0	+8	9	Advance to Round 2
2	L1	Barnsley	3	1	0	0	2	6	6	0	3	Advance to Round 2
3	ACA	Manchester United U21	3	1	0	0	2	4	8	−4	3	
4	L2	Notts County	3	1	0	0	2	2	6	−4	3	

Source: EFL

Win Draw Loss Fixtures

30 September 2025 Nor. Group D	Notts County	2–1	Barnsley	Nottingham
19:00 BST	Luker 9'; Norburn (yellow card) 45+1'; Robertson (yellow card) 56'; Tsaroulla (yellow card) 81'; Hall 89', (yellow card) 90+3'	Report	Bland (yellow card) 7' (yellow-red card) 53'; Keillor-Dunn 50'; Watson (yellow card) 84'	Stadium: Meadow Lane; Attendance: 1,822 (440 away); Referee: Peter Wright

21 October 2025 Nor. Group D	Barnsley	5–2	Manchester United U21	Barnsley
19:00 BST	McGoldrick 43' (pen.), 51', 62'; Farrugia 74'; Russell 79'	Report	Fletcher 7', (red card) 63'; Obi 53'	Stadium: Oakwell; Referee: William Davis

11 November 2025 Nor. Group D	Barnsley	0–2	Lincoln City	Barnsley
19:00 GMT	Graham (yellow card) 86'	Report	Okoronkwo 29'; Collins 61'	Stadium: Oakwell; Attendance: 1,202; Referee: Jacob Miles

2 December 2025 Round of 32	Port Vale	5–0	Barnsley	Burslem
19:00 GMT	Paton 5', 8'; Brown 72'; Waine 80'; Debrah 83'	Report		Stadium: Vale Park; Attendance: 636; Referee: Elliot Bell

== Statistics ==
=== Appearances and goals ===
As of match played 28 April 2026

Players with no appearances are not included on the list; italics indicate a loaned in player

No.	Pos	Nat	Player	Total		League One		FA Cup		EFL Cup		EFL Trophy	
No.	Pos	Nat	Player	Apps	Goals	Apps	Goals	Apps	Goals	Apps	Goals	Apps	Goals
1	GK	(Canada) CAN	Owen Goodman	22	0	22+0	0	0+0	0	0+0	0	0+0	0
3	MF	(Jamaica) JAM	Jon Russell	20	4	0+12	1	2+0	0	3+0	2	1+2	1
4	DF	(England) ENG	Marc Roberts	20	1	12+4	0	1+0	1	0+0	0	2+1	0
5	DF	(England) ENG	Jack Shepherd	47	0	37+2	0	2+0	0	3+0	0	2+1	0
6	DF	(France) FRA	Maël de Gevigney	36	0	19+10	0	2+0	0	2+0	0	3+0	0
7	DF	(Republic of Ireland) IRL	Corey O'Keeffe	23	0	20+2	0	1+0	0	0+0	0	0+0	0
8	MF	(England) ENG	Adam Phillips	49	10	29+13	8	2+0	1	0+2	1	1+2	0
9	FW	(Wales) WAL	Tom Bradshaw	18	3	13+5	3	0+0	0	0+0	0	0+0	0
10	FW	(Republic of Ireland) IRL	David McGoldrick	41	18	30+7	15	0+1	0	0+0	0	3+0	3
11	FW	(Portugal) POR	Fábio Jaló	4	0	1+2	0	1+0	0	0+0	0	0+0	0
14	DF	(England) ENG	Nathanael Ogbeta	30	0	14+9	0	2+0	0	2+1	0	2+0	0
15	DF	(Republic of Ireland) IRL	Eoghan O'Connell	25	1	23+1	1	0+1	0	0+0	0	0+0	0
17	DF	(England) ENG	Georgie Gent	6	0	2+2	0	1+1	0	0+0	0	0+0	0
18	FW	(Scotland) SCO	Scott Banks	21	3	16+5	3	0+0	0	0+0	0	0+0	0
19	FW	(England) ENG	Reyes Cleary	49	7	29+12	7	2+0	0	3+0	0	2+1	0
20	FW	(England) ENG	Charlie Lennon	2	1	0+2	1	0+0	0	0+0	0	0+0	0
22	MF	(Northern Ireland) NIR	Patrick Kelly	46	3	32+7	2	1+2	1	1+1	0	1+1	0
23	MF	(Zimbabwe) ZIM	Tawanda Chirewa	1	0	0+1	0	0+0	0	0+0	0	0+0	0
27	DF	(England) ENG	Tennai Watson	44	0	27+9	0	1+2	0	1+1	0	2+1	0
29	DF	(Republic of Ireland) IRL	Connor Barratt	6	0	0+1	0	0+1	0	2+1	0	1+0	0
30	MF	(Wales) WAL	Jonathan Bland	52	0	31+13	0	3+0	0	2+1	0	2+0	0
31	MF	(England) ENG	Kieran Graham	1	0	0+0	0	0+0	0	0+0	0	0+1	0
32	DF	(England) ENG	Josh Earl	22	1	20+0	1	0+0	0	0+1	0	0+1	0
33	DF	(England) ENG	Robson Woodcock	1	0	0+0	0	0+0	0	0+1	0	0+0	0
38	DF	(England) ENG	Matty Doyle	1	0	0+0	0	0+0	0	0+1	0	0+0	0
39	FW	(England) ENG	Leo Farrell	12	1	0+9	1	0+1	0	0+1	0	0+1	0
42	FW	(England) ENG	Luke Alker	2	0	0+0	0	0+0	0	0+0	0	0+2	0
45	MF	(Wales) WAL	Vimal Yoganathan	43	3	20+14	3	1+1	0	2+1	0	4+0	0
48	MF	(Republic of Ireland) IRL	Luca Connell	47	4	38+2	4	1+1	0	1+1	0	2+1	0
50	MF	(Nigeria) NGR	Kelechi Nwakali	3	0	0+3	0	0+0	0	0+0	0	0+0	0
51	GK	(England) ENG	Kieren Flavell	5	0	2+0	0	0+0	0	0+0	0	3+0	0
Players who featured but departed the club during the season:
1	GK	(England) ENG	Murphy Cooper	28	0	21+0	0	3+0	0	3+0	0	1+0	0
7	MF	(England) ENG	Caylan Vickers	22	2	12+3	2	1+0	0	2+0	0	4+0	0
18	DF	(England) ENG	Jake Rooney	7	0	1+0	0	1+1	0	1+0	0	3+0	0
23	DF	(Republic of Ireland) IRL	Neil Farrugia	21	1	2+10	0	2+0	0	2+1	0	3+1	1
40	MF	(England) ENG	Davis Keillor-Dunn	34	16	22+2	13	3+0	2	3+0	0	2+2	1
