= Vimal Yoganathan =

Welsh footballer (born 2006)

Personal information
- Full name: Vimal Yoganathan
- Date of birth: 13 January 2006 (age 20)
- Place of birth: Trelawnyd, Wales
- Height: 6 ft 3 in (1.91 m)
- Position: Midfielder

Team information
- Current team: Barnsley
- Number: 45

Youth career
- 2011–2014: Connah's Quay Nomads
- 2014–2021: Liverpool
- 2021–2023: Barnsley

Senior career*
Years	Team	Apps	(Gls)
2023–	Barnsley	47	(7)
2025	→ Oldham Athletic (loan)	14	(1)

International career^{‡}
2024–2025	Wales U19	11	(2)
2025–	Wales U21	1	(0)
- * Club domestic league appearances and goals as of 21 November 2026 (UTC) ‡ National team caps and goals as of 15:38, 8 September 2025 (UTC)

Vimal Yoganathan (born 13 January 2006) is a Welsh professional footballer who plays as a midfielder for EFL League One club Barnsley. He is a Wales under-21 international.

== Club career ==
Yoganathan was raised in Trelawnyd, Wales and began his career with local side Connah's Quay Nomads. He then moved to Prestatyn Town. At age six he was scouted by Liverpool and joined the club's shadow squad the following year. At age eight he was officially signed to the club's academy in the presence of Brendan Rodgers. During his time in the Liverpool Academy he served as a ball boy at Anfield, including during the Merseyside Derby.

Yoganathan later joined the under-16 side of Barnsley. In 2023 he won the U18 division with the club. That season he took part in twenty-nine of thirty-four matches. Yoganathan made his professional debut with the club on 8 August 2023 in a 2023–24 EFL Cup match against Tranmere Rovers. He entered the match as a 65th-minute substitute for Herbie Kane. With this appearance, he became the first player of Tamil heritage to play a professional senior game in English football. He scored his first senior goals when he scored twice in an EFL Trophy tie against Manchester United U21s on 20 August 2024.

On 31 January 2025, Yoganathan signed a new three-and-a-half-year contract with Barnsley, before immediately joining National League side Oldham Athletic on loan for the remainder of the 2024–25 season.

== International career ==
Yoganathan is of Sri Lankan Tamil descent and grew up in Trelawnyd. As a schoolboy, Yoganathan was called up for Wales at youth level to participate in training camps. On 22 March 2024, he made his debut for Wales under-19s as a substitute against Belgium.

== Career statistics ==
=== Club ===
As of match played on 24 October 2026

Appearances and goals by club, season and competition
Club	Season	League			National cup		League cup		Other		Total	
Club	Season	Division	Apps	Goals	Apps	Goals	Apps	Goals	Apps	Goals	Apps	Goals
Barnsley	2023–24	EFL League One	0	0	1	0	1	0	3 (Note: Appearance(s) in EFL Trophy)	0	5	0
Barnsley	2024–25	EFL League One	5	0	0	0	3	0	2	2	10	2
Barnsley	2025–26	EFL League One	34	3	2	0	3	0	4	0	43	3
Barnsley	2026–27	EFL League One	8	4	1	2	0	0	3	2	12	8
Barnsley	Total		47	7	4	2	7	0	12	4	70	13
Oldham Athletic	2024–25	National League	14	1	0	0	0	0	3 (Note: Appearance(s) in 2024–25 National League play-offs)	1	17	2
Career Total			58	6	3	0	7	0	14	4	87	15

== Honours ==
Oldham Athletic

- National League play-offs: 2025
