= Ziggy Kozluk =

English footballer (born 2005)

Personal information
- Date of birth: 10 November 2005 (age 21)
- Position: Defender

Team information
- Current team: Barnsley
- Number: 47

Youth career
- Barnsley

Senior career*
Years	Team	Apps	(Gls)
2024–	Barnsley	0	(0)
- * Club domestic league appearances and goals as of 08:52, 28 October 2024 (UTC)

Ziggy Kozluk (born 10 November 2005) is an English professional footballer who plays as a defender for EFL League One club Barnsley.

== Early life ==
Ziggy Kozluk was born on 10 November 2005. He is the son of former professional footballer Rob Kozluk, who also played as a full-back for Barnsley.

== Career ==
Kozluk turned professional at Barnsley in the summer of 2024. He made his first-team debut on 8 October 2024, coming on as a 89th-minute substitute for Kyran Lofthouse in a 2–0 defeat at Huddersfield Town in the EFL Trophy.

== Career statistics ==
As of match played 8 October 2024

Appearances and goals by club, season and competition
Club	Season	League			FA Cup		EFL Cup		Other		Total	
Club	Season	Division	Apps	Goals	Apps	Goals	Apps	Goals	Apps	Goals	Apps	Goals
Barnsley	2024–25	EFL League One	0	0	0	0	0	0	1 (Note: Appearance(s) in the EFL Trophy)	0	1	0
Career total			0	0	0	0	0	0	1	0	1	0
