= Maël de Gevigney =

French footballer (born 1999)

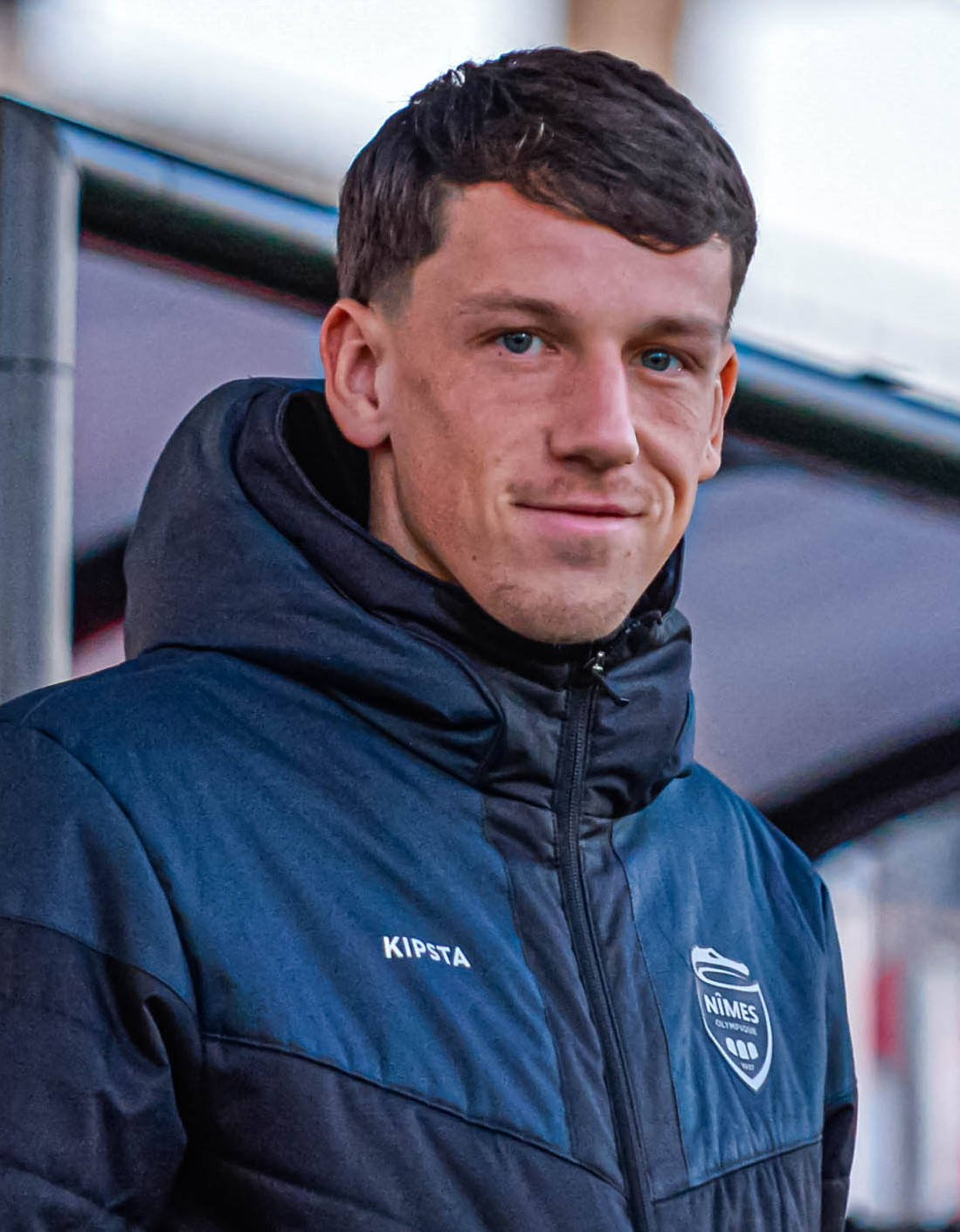
- De Gevigney in 2023

Personal information
- Full name: Maël Vincent Durand de Gevigney
- Date of birth: 21 September 1999 (age 27)
- Place of birth: Feucherolles, France
- Height: 1.86 m (6 ft 1 in)
- Position: Centre-back

Team information
- Current team: Silkeborg
- Number: 6

Youth career
- 2004–2010: Feucherolles USA
- 2010–2015: Versailles
- 2015–2017: AS Meudon
- 2017–2018: Drancy
- 2018–2019: Versailles

Senior career*
Years	Team	Apps	(Gls)
2019–2022	Versailles	55	(0)
2022–2023	Nîmes	31	(0)
2023–2026	Barnsley	109	(2)
2026–	Silkeborg	6	(0)
- * Club domestic league appearances and goals as of 16:08, 15 November 2026 (UTC)

Maël Vincent Durand de Gevigney (born 21 September 1999) is a French professional footballer who plays as a centre-back for Danish Superliga club Silkeborg.

== Career ==
Durand de Gevigney is a youth product of his local club Feucherolles USA, AS Meudon, Drancy, and Versailles.

He began his senior career with Versailles in 2019, and helped them achieve promotion into the Championnat National 2 in his second season with them, and was thereafter named their captain.

He was transferred to Nîmes on 30 June 2022, signing his first professional contract.

He made his professional debut with Nîmes as a late substitute in a 1–0 Ligue 2 loss to Caen on 30 July 2022.

In August 2023 he signed for English club Barnsley, competing in England's League One

His first career goal came in the 33rd minute of a League One match against Cambridge United on 3 October 2023.

On 18 August 2026, Danish Superliga side Silkeborg announced the signing of De Gevigney on a three-year deal, becoming the club's first ever French player.

== Personal life ==
Off the field, Maël earned a baccalaureate in science and a degree in STAPS (Sciences and Techniques of Physical and Sports Activities). He also completed training as a physiotherapist.

== Career statistics ==
As of 6 November 2026

Appearances and goals by club, season and competition
Club	Season	League			National Cup (Note: Includes Coupe de France, FA Cup)		League Cup (Note: Includes EFL Cup)		Other		Total	
Club	Season	Division	Apps	Goals	Apps	Goals	Apps	Goals	Apps	Goals	Apps	Goals
Versailles	2018–19	National 3	9	0	0	0	—		—		9	0
Versailles	2019–20	National 3	17	0	3	0	—		—		20	0
Versailles	2020–21	National 2	9	0	0	0	—		—		9	0
Versailles	2021–22	National 2	20	0	7	0	—		—		27	0
Versailles	Total		55	0	10	0	0	0	0	0	65	0
Nîmes	2022–23	Ligue 2	31	0	3	0	—		—		34	0
Barnsley	2023–24	League One	40	2	2	1	0	0	5 (Note: Three appearances in the EFL Trophy, two appearances in the League One play-offs)	0	47	3
Barnsley	2024–25	League One	39	0	2	0	3	0	0	0	44	0
Barnsley	2025–26	League One	30	0	2	0	2	0	3 (Note: Appearance(s) in EFL Trophy)	0	37	0
Barnsley	Total		109	2	6	1	5	0	8	0	128	3
Silkeborg	2026–27	Danish Superliga	6	0	1	0	—		—		7	0
Career total			201	2	20	1	5	0	8	0	234	3
