= Connor Barratt =

English footballer (born 2004)

Personal information
- Full name: Connor James Barratt
- Date of birth: 5 April 2004 (age 22)
- Place of birth: Wolverhampton, England
- Height: 1.90 m (6 ft 3 in)
- Position: Defender

Team information
- Current team: Barnsley
- Number: 29

Youth career
- –2022: Birmingham City
- 2022–2023: Sheffield United

Senior career*
Years	Team	Apps	(Gls)
2023–2024	Sheffield United	0	(0)
2023	→ Solihull Moors (loan)	1	(0)
2024–	Barnsley	6	(0)
2025	→ Kidderminster Harriers (loan)	4	(0)
2025	→ Bedford Town (loan)	5	(0)
2026	→ Galway United (loan)	27	(0)

International career^{‡}
2025	Republic of Ireland U21	2	(0)
- * Club domestic league appearances and goals as of 16:47, 31 October 2026 (UTC) ‡ National team caps and goals as of 00:21, 18 November 2026 (UTC)

Connor James Barratt (born 5 April 2004) is an Irish professional footballer who plays as a defender for EFL League One club Barnsley.

== Club career ==
=== Sheffield United ===
Barratt joined the Academy at Sheffield United as a second-year scholar from the Academy at Birmingham City in January 2022. He was a member of the Under-18 side that won the National title in an unbeaten campaign. He joined National League club Solihull Moors on loan in the first half of the 2023–24 season.

=== Barnsley ===
In July 2024, Barratt joined League One club Barnsley, initially joining the club's Under-21s team. On 20 August 2024, he made his debut for the club as a substitute in a 3–2 EFL Trophy defeat to Manchester United U21. In June 2025, he signed a new two-year contract with the Tykes.

On 4 October 2025, he joined National League North club Kidderminster Harriers on an initial one-month loan deal. On 7 November 2025, he joined Bedford Town on an initial 28 day loan deal.

On 3 February 2026, Barratt signed for League of Ireland Premier Division club Galway United on loan until the end of June 2026. On 1 July 2026, it was announced that his loan deal had been extended to the end of Galway's season in November.

== International career ==
On 13 March 2025, Barratt received his first Republic of Ireland U21 call up for their friendlies against Scotland U21 & Hungary U21 in Spain. He made his debut for the side against Scotland U21 on 21 March, in a 2–0 defeat.

== Career statistics ==
As of match played 30 October 2026

Appearances and goals by club, season and competition
Club	Season	League			National Cup (Note: Includes FA Cup)		League Cup (Note: Includes EFL Cup)		Other		Total	
Club	Season	Division	Apps	Goals	Apps	Goals	Apps	Goals	Apps	Goals	Apps	Goals
Sheffield United	2023–24	Premier League	0	0	0	0	0	0	0	0	0	0
Solihull Moors (loan)	2023–24	National League	1	0	0	0	0	0	0	0	1	0
Barnsley	2024–25	League One	5	0	0	0	0	0	3 (Note: Appearance(s) in the EFL Trophy)	0	8	0
Barnsley	2025–26	League One	1	0	1	0	3	0	1	0	6	0
Barnsley	Total		6	0	1	0	3	0	4	0	14	0
Kidderminster Harriers (loan)	2025–26	National League North	4	0	0	0	0	0	0	0	4	0
Bedford Town (loan)	2025–26	National League North	5	0	0	0	0	0	0	0	5	0
Galway United (loan)	2026	LOI Premier Division	27	0	4	0	0	0	0	0	31	0
Career total			43	0	5	0	3	0	4	0	55	0
