= Luca Connell =

English-Irish footballer (born 2001)

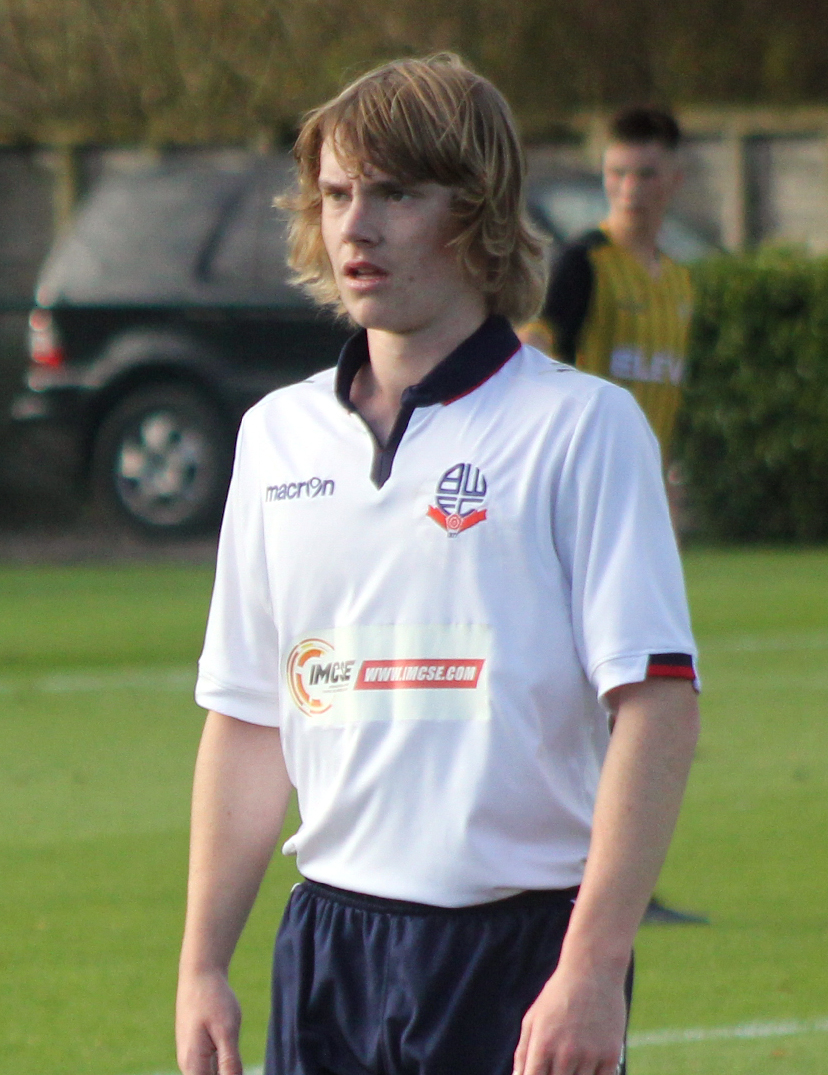
- Connell playing for Bolton Wanderers U18s in 2017

Personal information
- Full name: Luca John Connell
- Date of birth: 20 April 2001 (age 25)
- Place of birth: Liverpool, England
- Height: 5 ft 11 in (1.81 m)
- Position: Defensive midfielder

Team information
- Current team: Barnsley
- Number: 48

Youth career
- 2010–2019: Bolton Wanderers

Senior career*
| Years | Team | Apps | (Gls) |
| 2019 | Bolton Wanderers | 10 | (0) |
| 2019–2022 | Celtic | 0 | (0) |
| 2021 | → Queen's Park (loan) | 11 | (3) |
| 2021–2022 | → Queen's Park (loan) | 27 | (7) |
| 2022– | Barnsley | 152 | (9) |

International career^{‡}
| 2018 | Republic of Ireland U17 | 4 | (0) |
| 2018 | Republic of Ireland U18 | 3 | (0) |
| 2019 | Republic of Ireland U19 | 3 | (0) |
| 2021 | Republic of Ireland U21 | 3 | (0) |
- * Club domestic league appearances and goals as of 16:32, 24 October 2026 (UTC) ‡ National team caps and goals as of 17:17, 29 September 2022 (UTC)

Luca John Connell (born 20 April 2001) is a professional footballer who plays as a defensive midfielder and is the captain of EFL League One side Barnsley. Born in England, he has represented the Republic of Ireland at youth international level.

He started his senior career with Bolton Wanderers before moving to Celtic, from whom he spent two loan spells at Queen's Park.

== Early life ==
Connell was born in Liverpool, Merseyside.

== Club career ==
=== Bolton Wanderers ===
Connell joined Bolton Wanderers at the age of nine. He joined the Under-18s as a first-year scholar for the 2017–18 season, and was promoted to the Under-23s for the 2018–19 campaign.

On 5 January 2019, Connell made his competitive debut in a 5–2 win over Walsall in the FA Cup third round as an 89th-minute substitute replacing Luke Murphy. Two weeks later, he was named as unused substitute in a 2–0 league defeat to West Bromwich Albion. On 25 January, Connell started his first senior game in a 2–1 defeat to Bristol City in the FA Cup fourth round and assisted Mark Beevers' goal. He was rewarded with a league debut four days later in a 1–1 draw against Reading. Connell's scholarship contract was extended for a further year on 21 May 2019.

=== Celtic and Queen's Park ===
On 29 June 2019, Connell signed a four-year deal with Celtic for a fee of around £350,000.

Connell was loaned to Queen's Park in March 2021 and again in September 2021. He helped them achieve back to back promotions during his two loan spells (from League Two to League One and then from League One to the Championship).

On 3 June 2022, it was announced that Connell had been released by Celtic, despite having a year left on his contract. He left without having made a senior appearance during his three years with the club.

=== Barnsley ===
On 17 June 2022, Connell returned to England to join League One club Barnsley on a three-year contract. In his first season, he helped the club to reach the play-off final, losing 0–1 to Sheffield Wednesday.

On 8 August 2024, Barnsley confirmed Connell as the club's captain after the departure of Jordan Williams, alongside Marc Roberts who was named as the club's vice-captain.

== International career ==
Connell is eligible to represent both England and the Republic of Ireland.

In August 2017, Connell was invited to train with the Republic of Ireland under-17 squad. On 21 March 2018, Connell made his international debut at under-17 level in a 3–0 win against Macedonia. Three days later, he featured in a 2–0 victory against Georgia. In May 2018, Connell made two appearances in the 2018 UEFA European Under-17 Championship group stages, playing in wins against Denmark and Bosnia and Herzegovina.

He was called up to the under-18s for the first time in November 2018, and made his debut in a 2–1 win against Belgium. In the following days, Connell started in a 3–1 defeat to England and 1–0 win against the Netherlands. In March 2019, he was called up to the under-19s. Connell featured in victories against Romania, Azerbaijan and Russia as Ireland qualified for the UEFA European Under-19 Championship.

In May 2019 he received his first call-up to the Republic of Ireland senior national team. Connell's first trip with the Republic of Ireland squad ended prematurely though as he was forced to pull out of the squad with a thigh strain.

Connell made his Republic of Ireland U21 debut on 26 March 2021, playing the full 90 minutes in a 2–1 win over Wales U21 in Wrexham.

== Career statistics ==
As of match played on 24 October 2026

Appearances and goals by club, season and competition
| Club | Season | League | | | National cup (Note: Includes FA Cup, Scottish Cup) | | League cup (Note: Includes EFL Cup, Scottish League Cup) | | Other | | Total | |
| Club | Season | Division | Apps | Goals | Apps | Goals | Apps | Goals | Apps | Goals | Apps | Goals |
|---|---|---|---|---|---|---|---|---|---|---|---|---|
| Bolton Wanderers | 2018–19 | EFL Championship | 10 | 0 | 2 | 0 | 0 | 0 | — | | 12 | 0 |
| Celtic | 2019–20 | Scottish Premiership | 0 | 0 | 0 | 0 | 0 | 0 | 0 | 0 | 0 | 0 |
| Celtic | 2020–21 | Scottish Premiership | 0 | 0 | 0 | 0 | 0 | 0 | 0 | 0 | 0 | 0 |
| Celtic | 2021–22 | Scottish Premiership | 0 | 0 | 0 | 0 | 0 | 0 | 0 | 0 | 0 | 0 |
| Celtic | Total | | 0 | 0 | – | – | 0 | 0 | 0 | 0 | 0 | 0 |
| Celtic B | 2019–20 | — | — | | — | | — | | 2 (Note: Appearance(s) in Scottish Challenge Cup) | 0 | 2 | 0 |
| Celtic B | 2021–22 | — | — | | — | | — | | 1 | 0 | 1 | 0 |
| Celtic B | Total | | — | | — | | — | | 3 | 0 | 3 | 0 |
| Queen's Park (loan) | 2020–21 | Scottish League Two | 11 | 3 | — | | — | | — | | 11 | 3 |
| Queen's Park (loan) | 2021–22 | Scottish League One | 27 | 7 | 1 | 0 | — | | 3 (Note: Appearances in Scottish Championship play-offs) | 0 | 31 | 7 |
| Barnsley | 2022–23 | EFL League One | 39 | 2 | 3 | 0 | 2 | 0 | 4 (Note: Appearance(s) in EFL Trophy) | 0 | 48 | 2 |
| Barnsley | 2023–24 | EFL League One | 24 | 1 | 2 | 0 | 0 | 0 | 3 (Note: One Appearance in EFL Trophy, two appearances in League One play-offs) | 0 | 29 | 1 |
| Barnsley | 2024–25 | EFL League One | 41 | 2 | 2 | 0 | 3 | 0 | 0 | 0 | 46 | 2 |
| Barnsley | 2025–26 | EFL League One | 41 | 4 | 2 | 0 | 2 | 0 | 3 | 0 | 48 | 4 |
| Barnsley | 2026–27 | EFL League One | 7 | 0 | 0 | 0 | 2 | 0 | 2 | 1 | 11 | 1 |
| Barnsley | Total | | 152 | 9 | 9 | 0 | 9 | 0 | 12 | 1 | 182 | 10 |
| Career total | | | 200 | 19 | 12 | 0 | 9 | 0 | 18 | 1 | 239 | 20 |

== Honours ==
Queen's Park

- Scottish League Two: 2020–21
- Scottish League One promotion play-offs: 2022

Individual

- PFA Team of the Year: 2022–23 League One
