= Jack Shepherd (footballer) =

English footballer (born 2001)

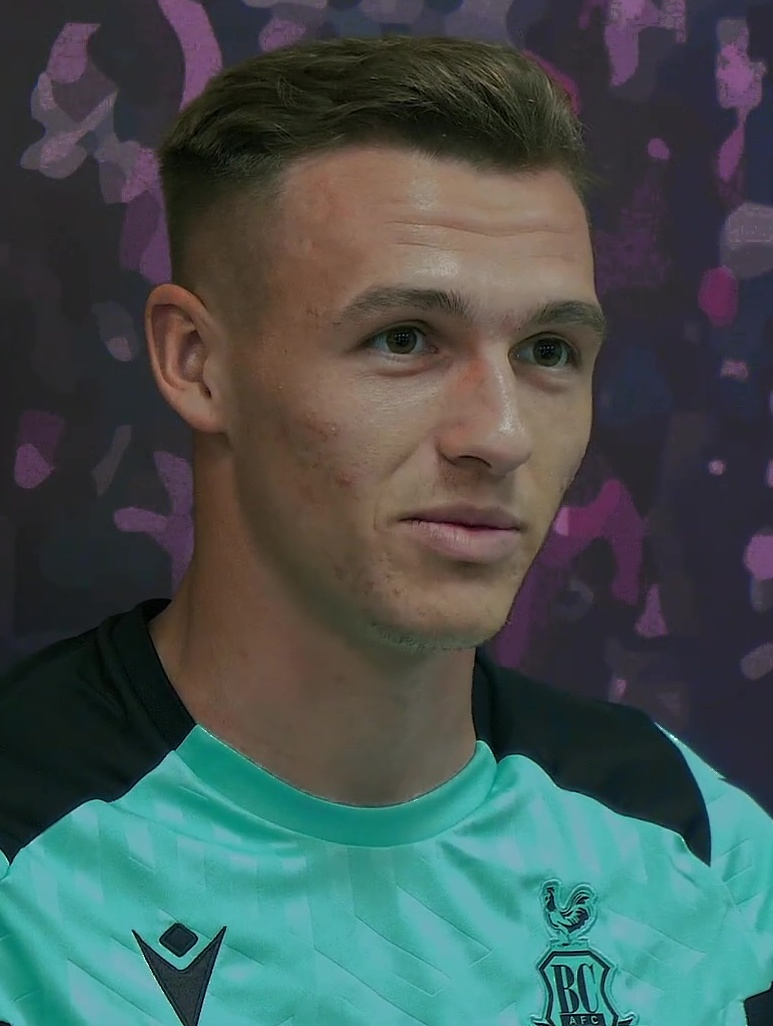

Personal information
- Full name: Jack Timothy Shepherd
- Date of birth: 24 June 2001 (age 25)
- Place of birth: Sheffield, England
- Height: 1.89 m (6 ft 2 in)
- Position: Centre-back

Team information
- Current team: Barnsley
- Number: 5

Senior career*
Years	Team	Apps	(Gls)
- Penistone Church
- Athersley Recreation
- Penistone Church
2021–2023	Pontefract Collieries	49	(2)
2023–	Barnsley	53	(0)
2024	→ Cheltenham Town (loan)	12	(1)
2024–2025	→ Bradford City (loan)	39	(2)
- * Club domestic league appearances and goals as of 16:22, 24 October 2026 (UTC)

Jack Timothy Shepherd (born 24 June 2001) is an English professional footballer who plays as a centre-back for EFL League One club Barnsley.

A ball-playing centre-half, Shepherd played non-League football with Penistone Church, Athersley Recreation and Pontefract Collieries, before turning professional with Barnsley in July 2023.

== Career ==
=== Early career ===
Shepherd played Northern Counties East League football for Penistone Church (over two spells) and Athersley Recreation. He was voted Wentworth Pewter Player of the Month at Penistone in October 2020. He joined Pontefract Collieries in the Northern Premier League Division One East in September 2021. He made his debut for Pontefract playing at left-back against Yorkshire Amateurs in the FA Trophy. He reverted to centre-half and earned comparisons to Paolo Maldini by Colls supporters as he scored three goals during some impressive performances during the 2022–23 season. He signed contract extensions in March 2022 and March 2023. He won the club's young player of the season for two consecutive years.

=== Barnsley ===
On 4 July 2023, Shepherd signed with EFL League One club Barnsley after impressing Academy Manager Bobby Hassell on trial. Barnsley agreed to play Pontefract in a pre-season friendly as part of the deal, whilst agreeing to a "significant sell on clause". Shepherd quit his job as a kitchen-fitter to turn professional. He made his first-team debut on 5 August 2023, coming on as a substitute in a 7–0 win over Port Vale at Oakwell, in what was the biggest opening day defeat for any team in the English Football League since the 1962–63 season over 60 years ago. Shepherd then made his first league start for Barnsley in an impressive 2-0 win away at Wigan on 26 August 2023.

On 1 August 2024, Shepherd joined League Two club Bradford City on a season-long loan deal.

== Style of play ==
Shepherd is a left-sided centre-half who is adept at playing the ball out from the back.

== Career statistics ==
As of match played on 24 October 2026

Appearances and goals by club, season and competition
Club	Season	League			FA Cup		EFL Cup		Other		Total	
Club	Season	Division	Apps	Goals	Apps	Goals	Apps	Goals	Apps	Goals	Apps	Goals
Pontefract Collieries	2021–22	Northern Premier League; Division One East	21	0	0	0	—		2 (Note: 1 appearance in the FA Trophy and 1 appearance in the West Riding County Cup)	0	23	0
Pontefract Collieries	2022–23	Northern Premier League; Division One East	28	2	2	0	—		0	0	30	2
Pontefract Collieries	Total		49	2	2	0	—		2	0	53	2
Barnsley	2023–24	League One	9	0	1	0	1	0	2 (Note: Appearance(s) in EFL Trophy)	0	13	0
Barnsley	2024–25	League One	0	0	0	0	0	0	0	0	0	0
Barnsley	2025–26	League One	39	0	2	0	3	0	3	0	47	0
Barnsley	2026–27	League One	5	0	0	0	0	0	2	0	7	0
Barnsley	Total		53	0	3	0	4	0	7	0	67	0
Cheltenham Town (loan)	2023–24	League One	12	1	0	0	0	0	0	0	12	1
Bradford City (loan)	2024–25	League Two	39	2	2	0	1	0	7	1	49	3
Career total			153	5	7	0	5	0	16	1	181	6
