= Georgie Gent (footballer) =

English footballer (born 2003)

Personal information
- Full name: Georgie Simon Gent
- Date of birth: 23 September 2003 (age 23)
- Place of birth: Manchester, England
- Height: 1.81 m (5 ft 11 in)
- Positions: Left-back; left wing-back

Team information
- Current team: Boston United (on loan from Barnsley)

Youth career
- Manchester City
- 2019–2023: Blackburn Rovers

Senior career*
Years	Team	Apps	(Gls)
2023–2024	Blackburn Rovers	0	(0)
2023–2024	→ Motherwell (loan)	29	(1)
2024–	Barnsley	29	(1)
2026–	→ Boston United (loan)	7	(0)
- * Club domestic league appearances and goals as of 23:24, 12 October 2026 (UTC)

Georgie Simon Gent (born 23 September 2003) is an English professional footballer who plays as a left-back or left wing-back for Boston United, on loan from EFL League One club Barnsley.

== Career ==
=== Blackburn Rovers ===
Gent joined Blackburn Rovers in 2019, after leaving Manchester City. On 4 April 2022, he signed his first professional contract.

==== Motherwell (loan) ====
On 1 September 2023, Gent joined Motherwell on loan until the end of the season. He made his league debut in a 1–0 loss against St Mirren on 16 September 2023, coming off the bench in the 83rd minute.

=== Barnsley ===
On 2 August 2024, Gent joined Barnsley for an undisclosed fee.

On 7 September 2026, Gent joined National League club Boston United on an initial one-month loan deal.

== Career statistics ==
As of match played on 17 October 2026

Appearances and goals by club, season and competition
Club	Season	League			National cup (Note: Includes FA Cup and Scottish Cup)		League cup (Note: Includes EFL Cup and Scottish League Cup)		Other		Total	
Club	Season	Division	Apps	Goals	Apps	Goals	Apps	Goals	Apps	Goals	Apps	Goals
Blackburn Rovers	2023–24	Championship	0	0	0	0	0	0	—		0	0
Motherwell (loan)	2023–24	Scottish Premiership	29	1	2	1	0	0	—		31	2
Barnsley	2024–25	League One	25	1	2	0	1	0	2 (Note: Appearance(s) in EFL Trophy)	0	30	1
Barnsley	2025–26	League One	4	0	2	0	0	0	0	0	6	0
Barnsley	2026–27	League One	0	0	0	0	0	0	0	0	0	0
Barnsley	Total		29	1	4	0	1	0	2	0	36	1
Boston United (loan)	2026–27	National League	7	0	1	0	0	0	1 (Note: Appearance in National League Cup)	0	9	0
Career total			65	2	7	1	1	0	3	0	76	3
