= Neil Farrugia =

Irish footballer (born 1999)

- Farrugia with Dundee United in 2026

Personal information
- Full name: Neil Yves Farrugia
- Date of birth: 19 May 1999 (age 27)
- Place of birth: Paris, France
- Height: 1.87 m (6 ft 2 in)
- Position: Defender

Team information
- Current team: Dundee United
- Number: 20

Youth career
- St James' Athletic
- St Joseph's Boys
- Belvedere
- 2015–2017: UCD

Senior career*
Years	Team	Apps	(Gls)
2017–2019	UCD	34	(2)
2019–2024	Shamrock Rovers	100	(10)
2025–2026	Barnsley	21	(0)
2026–	Dundee United	13	(0)

International career^{‡}
2017	Republic of Ireland U19	3	(1)
2019	Republic of Ireland U21	1	(1)
- * Club domestic league appearances and goals as of 20 May 2026 ‡ National team caps and goals as of 14:09, 30 April 2025 (UTC)

Neil Yves Farrugia (born 19 May 1999) is a professional footballer who plays as a defender for Scottish Premiership club Dundee United. Born in France, he has represented the Republic of Ireland at youth level.

== Club career ==
=== Youth career ===
Born in Paris, France to a French father and Irish mother, Farrugia moved to Dublin aged 7, where he played with St James' Athletic, St Joseph's Boys and Belvedere before moving to the youth academy of UCD in 2015. He attended secondary school in St Andrew's College in Blackrock, Dublin and was named the FAI Schools Player of the Year for 2016–17.

=== UCD ===
On 24 February 2017, Farrugia made his senior debut for UCD in the opening game of the 2017 League of Ireland First Division season, in a 1–0 win away to Cabinteely. He scored the first goal of his senior career on 13 July 2018 in a 3–0 win away to Wexford at Ferrycarrig Park. Farrugia was part of the team that won the 2018 League of Ireland First Division title, gaining promotion to the Premier Division. His first ever Premier Division goal came on 25 February 2019, when he opened the scoring in an eventual 2–1 loss away to reigning champions Dundalk at Oriel Park. Farrugia went on trial with the Manchester City U23 side during the summer transfer window but opted to remain in Ireland to complete his degree in biomedical science at University College Dublin.

=== Shamrock Rovers ===
On 26 June 2019, it was announced that Farrugia had signed for Shamrock Rovers. On 3 November 2019, he came off the bench in the 2019 FAI Cup Final, as his side won the trophy after a penalty shootout win over Dundalk at the Aviva Stadium. He was part of the squad that won the 2020 League of Ireland Premier Division, his first time winning the title. His first few years at the club were blighted with injuries, resulting in a large amount of fixtures being missed, with 17 appearances being the highest amount he made in a season up until 2022. After an impressive campaign in 2022 and continued good form in 2023, Farrugia's form saw him called up to the Republic of Ireland squad for a training camp in May 2023.

Farrugia made the most appearances of his career in his last season in Tallaght which included goals in the 2024–25 UEFA Europa League against NK Celje and in the 2024–25 UEFA Conference League against FK Borac Banja Luka as Rovers became the first Irish side to qualify for the knockout stages of a UEFA club competition.

=== Barnsley ===
On 3 January 2025, Farrugia signed a two-and-a-half year contract with EFL League One club Barnsley on a free transfer, after his contract at Shamrock Rovers had ended at the end of the previous month. On 21 January 2026, he scored his first goal for the club, in a 5–2 win over Manchester United U21 in an EFL Trophy game at Oakwell. He made 30 appearances in all competitions for the club, scoring 1 goal by January 2026, when he was linked with a move away from the club.

=== Dundee United ===
On 14 January 2026, Farrugia signed for Scottish Premiership club Dundee United for an undisclosed fee on a two-and-a-half year contract.

== International career ==
Farrugia is eligible to play for France, Ireland, Spain and Malta, but opted for Ireland during his youth career and turned down approaches from Malta for an international callup. Farrugia represented both the Republic of Ireland U19 and Republic of Ireland U21 teams, scoring on his debut for the U21s in a 3–0 win over Luxembourg U21 at Tallaght Stadium on 24 March 2019. In May 2023, former U21 manager Stephen Kenny called him up to the Republic of Ireland senior squad for the first time, for a training camp in Bristol, England, before putting him on standby for the June 2023 fixtures against Greece and Gibraltar.

== Personal life ==
Farrugia completed a degree in biomedical science at University College Dublin, graduating in 2020.

== Career statistics ==
As of match played on 26 December 2025

Appearances and goals by club, season and competition
Club	Season	League			National cup (Note: Includes FAI Cup & FA Cup)		League cup (Note: Includes League of Ireland Cup & EFL Cup)		Europe		Other		Total	
Club	Season	Division	Apps	Goals	Apps	Goals	Apps	Goals	Apps	Goals	Apps	Goals	Apps	Goals
UCD	2017	LOI First Division	5	0	1	0	0	0	—		0 (Note: Appearance(s) in the Leinster Senior Cup)	0	6	0
UCD	2018	LOI First Division	11	1	4	0	0	0	—		0	0	15	1
UCD	2019	LOI Premier Division	18	1	—		1	1	—		0	0	19	2
UCD	Total		34	2	5	0	1	1	—		0	0	40	3
Shamrock Rovers	2019	LOI Premier Division	3	0	1	0	—		0 (Note: Appearance(s) in the UEFA Europa League)	0	–		4	0
Shamrock Rovers	2020	LOI Premier Division	14	1	1	0	—		2	0	–		17	1
Shamrock Rovers	2021	LOI Premier Division	11	0	0	0	—		0 (Note: Appearance(s) in the UEFA Champions League & UEFA Europa Conference League)	0	0 (Note: Appearance in the President of Ireland's Cup)	0	11	0
Shamrock Rovers	2022	LOI Premier Division	23	3	3	0	—		11 (Note: One appearance in the UEFA Champions League; four appearances in the UEFA Europa League; six appearances in the UEFA Europa Conference League)	0	1	0	35	3
Shamrock Rovers	2023	LOI Premier Division	27	4	0	0	—		0	0	1	0	28	4
Shamrock Rovers	2024	LOI Premier Division	22	2	1	0	—		13 (Note: 4 appearances in the UEFA Champions League; 4 appearances, 1 goal in the UEFA Europa League; 5 appearances, 1 goal in the UEFA Conference League)	2	1	0	37	4
Shamrock Rovers	Total		100	10	6	0	–		26	2	3	0	135	12
Barnsley	2024–25	EFL League One	9	0	—		—		—		—		9	0
Barnsley	2025–26	EFL League One	12	0	2	0	3	0	—		4 (Note: Appearances in the EFL Trophy)	1	21	1
Barnsley	Total		21	0	2	0	3	0	–		4	1	30	1
Dundee United	2025–26	Scottish Premiership	2	0	0	0	—		—		—		2	0
Career total			157	12	13	0	4	1	26	2	7	1	207	16

== Honours ==
UCD

- League of Ireland First Division: 2018

Shamrock Rovers

- League of Ireland Premier Division: 2020, 2021, 2022, 2023
- FAI Cup: 2019
- President of Ireland's Cup: 2022, 2024
