= Patrick Kelly (footballer, born 2004) =

Northern Irish footballer (born 2004)

Personal information
- Full name: Patrick Kelly
- Date of birth: 2 October 2004 (age 22)
- Place of birth: Portstewart, Northern Ireland
- Height: 1.83 m (6 ft 0 in)
- Position: Midfielder

Team information
- Current team: Barnsley
- Number: 22

Youth career
- –2021: Coleraine

Senior career*
Years	Team	Apps	(Gls)
2021–2022	Coleraine	23	(0)
2022–2025	West Ham United	0	(0)
2024–2025	→ Doncaster Rovers (loan)	30	(2)
2025–	Barnsley	53	(3)

International career^{‡}
2022	Northern Ireland U18	2	(0)
2022	Northern Ireland U19	3	(2)
2023–	Northern Ireland U21	12	(1)
2025–	Northern Ireland	10	(1)
- * Club domestic league appearances and goals as of 07:28, 21 November 2026 (UTC) ‡ National team caps and goals as of 00:15, 18 November 2026 (UTC)

Patrick Kelly (born 2 October 2004) is a Northern Irish professional footballer who plays as a midfielder for EFL League One club Barnsley and the Northern Ireland national team.

== Club career ==
Kelly began his career with Coleraine, where he spent one season with the senior team after making his debut in November 2021.

Kelly signed for West Ham United in June 2022, initially playing for their under-18s.

Kelly moved on loan to Doncaster Rovers in August 2024. He made his first competitive appearance for Doncaster in the EFL Cup first round, starting against Salford City on 13 August 2024, in a 2–0 victory.

During the season, Kelly scored his first senior goal in the FA Cup with a strike in a 1–0 win over Barrow, and later opened his league scoring account with a goal in a 3–1 victory against Tranmere Rovers in December 2024.

During his loan Kelly earned both promotion and the EFL League Two title.

On 29 July 2025, Kelly joined League One side Barnsley on a free transfer, signing a three-year deal.

== International career ==
He is a Northern Ireland under-19 youth international.

On 17 November 2025, he made his debut for the Northern Ireland senior side in a 1–0 win over Luxembourg at Windsor Park, during qualifying for the 2026 FIFA World Cup.

Kelly scored his first senior goal for his country in a 3–1 friendly defeat to France at Stade Pierre-Mauroy on 8 June 2026.

== Personal life ==
In January 2023 Kelly signed a sponsorship deal with Adidas.

== Career statistics ==
=== Club ===
As of match played 20 November 2026

Appearances and goals by club, season and competition
Club	Season	League			National cup (Note: Includes Irish Cup, FA Cup)		League cup (Note: Includes Northern Ireland Football League Cup, EFL Cup)		Other		Total	
Club	Season	Division	Apps	Goals	Apps	Goals	Apps	Goals	Apps	Goals	Apps	Goals
Coleraine	2021–22	NIFL Premiership	23	0	2	1	3	0	0	0	28	1
West Ham United	2022–23	Premier League	0	0	0	0	0	0	1 (Note: Appearances in the EFL Trophy)	0	1	0
West Ham United	2023–24	Premier League	0	0	0	0	0	0	5	0	5	0
West Ham United	2024–25	Premier League	0	0	0	0	0	0	0	0	0	0
West Ham United	Total		0	0	0	0	0	0	6	0	6	0
Doncaster Rovers (loan)	2024–25	EFL League Two	30	2	3	1	2	0	3	0	38	3
Barnsley	2025–26	EFL League One	40	2	3	1	2	0	2	0	47	3
Barnsley	2026–27	EFL League One	13	1	1	0	3	0	0	0	17	1
Barnsley	Total		53	3	4	1	5	0	2	0	64	4
Career total			106	5	9	3	10	0	11	0	136	8

=== International ===
As of match played 17 November 2026

Appearances and goals by national team and year
National team	Year	Apps	Goals
Northern Ireland	2025	1	0
Northern Ireland	2026	9	1
Total		10	1

As of match played 8 June 2026. Northern Ireland's score listed first, score column indicates score after each Kelly goal.

List of international goals scored by Patrick Kelly
No.	Date	Venue	Cap	Opponent	Score	Result	Competition
1	9 June 2026	Stade Pierre-Mauroy, Villeneuve-d'Ascq, Frances	4	France	1–2	1–3	Friendly

== Honours ==
Doncaster Rovers

- EFL League Two: 2024–25
