= Jackson Smith (footballer) =

English footballer (born 2001)

Personal information
- Full name: Jackson William Smith
- Date of birth: 14 October 2001 (age 25)
- Place of birth: Telford, England
- Height: 1.87 m (6 ft 2 in)
- Position: Goalkeeper

Team information
- Current team: Port Vale
- Number: 1

Youth career
- 2009–2021: Wolverhampton Wanderers

Senior career*
Years	Team	Apps	(Gls)
2021–2023	Wolverhampton Wanderers	0	(0)
2020–2021	→ Frickley Athletic (loan)	4	(0)
2021–2022	→ Kettering Town (loan)	31	(0)
2023	→ Walsall (loan)	2	(0)
2023–2024	Walsall	23	(0)
2024–2026	Barnsley	6	(0)
2024	→ Grimsby Town (loan)	6	(0)
2025	→ Rochdale (loan)	0	(0)
2025–2026	→ Grimsby Town (loan)	26	(0)
2026–	Port Vale	6	(0)
- * Club domestic league appearances and goals as of 15:56, 12 September 2026 (UTC)

Jackson William Smith (born 14 October 2001) is an English professional footballer who plays as a goalkeeper for EFL League Two club Port Vale.

Smith joined the Academy at Wolverhampton Wanderers at the age of eight and turned professional at the club in December 2018. He had loan spells wih non-League football with Frickley Athletic and Kettering Town, before signing with Walsall in July 2023 following a successful loan spell. He moved on to Barnsley 12 months later. He had loan spells at Grimsby Town and Rochdale, before he was sold to Port Vale in June 2026.

== Career ==
=== Wolverhampton Wanderers ===
Smith joined the Academy at Wolverhampton Wanderers at the age of eight. He attended the club’s partner school, Thomas Telford, where he became the first Wolves apprentice to attain the highest possible mark in GCSE maths – grade nine, and attain an Outstanding Achievement Award. He turned professional at the club in December 2018 after playing at Molineux in the FA Youth Cup. On 7 October 2020, he joined Northern Premier League Division One South East side Frickley Athletic on loan until January. He signed a contract extension at Wolves in May 2021.

He was loaned out to Kettering Town on 14 August 2021. He competed for a first-team place with Rhys Davies, with manager Paul Cox praising both men for their performances and attitudes. The loan was extended until the end of the 2021–22 season. He kept 12 clean sheets in 31 National League North matches. He agreed a new two-year contract with Wolves in June 2022. Having played pre-season friendlies against Levante, Farense and Besiktas, he was promoted to the Wolves first-team squad under Bruno Lage in September 2022 to act as back up to José Sá and Matija Sarkic.

=== Walsall ===
Smith moved on loan to League Two club Walsall on 27 January 2023. The move was welcomed by Walsall's first-choice goalkeeper Owen Evans, who manager Michael Flynn said Smith had been signed to provide with "much-needed competition". He made his debut on 29 April, appearing as a half-time substitute for the injured Evans, and his performance was praised by new manager Mat Sadler. He returned to the Bescot Stadium on a permanent basis after being sold to Walsall for an undisclosed fee on 21 July 2023, signing a one-year deal. On 16 March 2024, he was named in the EFL Team of the Week after saving a Noah Chilvers penalty during a 1–1 draw at Colchester United. He played 32 games in all competitions and won the club's 2023–24 Young Player of the Year award.

=== Barnsley ===
On 9 July 2024, Smith signed for League One club Barnsley on a four-year deal, with the option for a further year, for an undisclosed fee. Manager Darrell Clarke said he was a "long-term project" and the intention was for him to initially leave Oakwell on loan to find gametime elsewhere. Gabriel Slonina and Ben Killip were ahead of him in the pecking order.

On 1 October 2024, Smith signed for League Two club Grimsby Town on an initial emergency seven-day loan after the injury of both of Grimsby's senior goalkeepers. The loan was extended three times to run until 28 October. He appeared a total of seven times during his time at Grimsby.

Upon his return to Barnsley, he made his full debut for the club in a 2–1 win over Northampton Town on 25 February 2025. He played six games for the Tykes before picking up an injury in Conor Hourihane's first match in charge. He remained injured for the rest of the 2024–25 season and did not feature in the summer's pre-season friendly games.

He trained with Forest Green Rovers in August 2025. On 10 October, Smith joined National League club Rochdale on an emergency seven-day loan. Manager Jimmy McNulty, a former Barnsley defender, needed cover for an FA Cup qualification game, a defeat to York City at Spotland.

On 20 December 2025, Smith returned to Grimsby Town on another seven-day emergency loan after first-choice goalkeeper Christy Pym suffered an injury. He began his second spell later that day in a 2–0 defeat away to Bromley. Smith subsequently kept three consecutive clean sheets as Grimsby collected seven points from matches against Oldham Athletic, Shrewsbury Town and Fleetwood Town. After the emergency arrangement had been renewed twice, Barnsley agreed on 8 January to loan him to Grimsby for the remainder of the 2025–26 season. Smith established himself as Grimsby's first-choice goalkeeper during the second half of the season, at the expense of a now fit, Pym; he started 26 league matches, conceding 22 goals and keeping 13 clean sheets as the club qualified for the League Two play-offs. He started both legs of the play-off semi-final against Salford City. Grimsby recovered from a 2–1 first-leg defeat to level the aggregate score during the return match, but were eliminated when Salford scored three minutes before the end of extra time.

=== Port Vale ===
On 19 June 2026, Smith signed for League Two club Port Vale for an undisclosed fee on a three-year contract. Manager Jon Brady said he had "proven he has what it takes to provide a steady and reassuring presence at the back". However, on 5 September, Smith made what BBC Sport described as a "calamitous goalkeeping error" to allow a tame free-kick into his net in a 1–0 defeat at Salford City. He suffered a concussion the following week and lost his first-team place to Marko Maroši.

== Style of play ==
Speaking in 2024, Barnsley's Sporting Director, Mladen Sormaz, described Smith as an "exciting young goalkeeper... a good shot-stopper, he can play with his feet and commands his box well".

== Career statistics ==
As of match played 27 October 2026

Appearances and goals by club, season and competition
Club	Season	League			FA Cup		EFL Cup		Other		Total	
Club	Season	Division	Apps	Goals	Apps	Goals	Apps	Goals	Apps	Goals	Apps	Goals
Wolverhampton Wanderers	2020–21	Premier League	0	0	0	0	0	0	—		0	0
Wolverhampton Wanderers	2021–22	Premier League	0	0	0	0	0	0	—		0	0
Wolverhampton Wanderers	2022–23	Premier League	0	0	0	0	0	0	—		0	0
Wolverhampton Wanderers	Total		0	0	0	0	0	0	0	0	0	0
Wolverhampton Wanderers U21	2022–23	—			—		—		1 (Note: Appearance(s) in EFL Trophy)	0	1	0
Frickley Athletic (loan)	2020–21	NPL Division One South East	4	0	—		—		1 (Note: Appearance in FA Trophy)	0	5	0
Kettering Town (loan)	2021–22	National League North	31	0	2	0	—		0	0	33	0
Walsall (loan)	2022–23	League Two	2	0	0	0	—		—		2	0
Walsall	2023–24	League Two	23	0	3	0	1	0	3	0	30	0
Walsall	Total		25	0	3	0	1	0	3	0	32	0
Barnsley	2024–25	League One	6	0	0	0	0	0	0	0	6	0
Barnsley	2025–26	League One	0	0	0	0	0	0	0	0	0	0
Barnsley	Total		6	0	0	0	0	0	0	0	6	0
Grimsby Town (loan)	2024–25	League Two	6	0	0	0	—		1	0	7	0
Rochdale (loan)	2025–26	National League	0	0	1	0	—		0	0	1	0
Grimsby Town (loan)	2025–26	League Two	26	0	2	0	—		2 (Note: Appearances in League Two play-offs)	0	30	0
Port Vale	2026–27	League Two	6	0	0	0	1	0	1	0	8	0
Career total			104	0	8	0	2	0	9	0	123	0

== Honours ==
Individual

- Walsall Supporters' Young Player of the Season: 2023–24
