= Fábio Jaló =

Portuguese footballer (born 2005)

Personal information
- Full name: Fábio Rúben Soares Jaló
- Date of birth: 18 November 2005 (age 20)
- Place of birth: Lisbon, Portugal
- Height: 1.77 m (5 ft 10 in)
- Position: Forward

Team information
- Current team: Barnsley
- Number: 18

Youth career
- 2014–2019: Benfica
- 2019–2022: Barnsley

Senior career*
Years	Team	Apps	(Gls)
2022–	Barnsley	40	(3)
2026	→ Oldham Athletic (loan)	2	(0)

International career^{‡}
2023	Portugal U18	6	(1)
2023–2024	Portugal U19	11	(3)
2024	Portugal U20	2	(0)
- * Club domestic league appearances and goals as of 10:37, 5 June 2026 (UTC) ‡ National team caps and goals as of 06:55, 15 October 2026 (UTC)

Fábio Rúben Soares Jaló (born 18 November 2005) is a Portuguese professional footballer who plays as a forward for EFL League One side Barnsley.

== Career ==
Jaló began playing football in his native Portugal with Benfica, before moving to England with Barnsley in 2019. He signed his first professional contract with Barnsley at the age of 16 in July 2022, having been named as 2021–22 Academy Player of the Season after scoring 27 goals in all competitions. He made his senior debut on 10 August, in a 1–0 victory at Middlesbrough in the EFL Cup, becoming the sixth youngest player in the club's history. On 11 October 2022, Jalo scored his first professional goals, scoring twice in a 4–2 away victory over Doncaster Rovers in the EFL Trophy. On 30 January 2026, Jaló joined League Two side Oldham Athletic on loan until the end of the season.

== International career ==
Jaló was first called up to the Portugal U-18 team for a training camp, on 18 January 2023

== Career statistics ==
As of 10 October 2026

Appearances and goals by club, season and competition
Club	Season	League			FA Cup		EFL Cup		Other		Total	
Club	Season	Division	Apps	Goals	Apps	Goals	Apps	Goals	Apps	Goals	Apps	Goals
Barnsley	2022–23	League One	7	0	1	0	0	0	3 (Note: Appearance(s) in EFL Trophy)	2	11	2
Barnsley	2023–24	League One	14	1	1	1	1	0	3 (Note: Two appearances in EFL Trophy, one appearance in League One play-offs)	0	19	2
Barnsley	2024–25	League One	16	2	1	0	1	0	1	0	19	2
Barnsley	2025–26	League One	3	0	1	0	0	0	0	0	4	0
Barnsley	2026–27	League One	0	0	0	0	0	0	0	0	0	0
Barnsley	Total		40	3	4	1	2	0	7	2	53	6
Oldham Athletic (loan)	2025–26	League Two	2	0	—		—		—		2	0
Career total			42	3	4	1	2	0	7	2	55	6
