= 2024–25 Barnsley F.C. season =

138th season in existence of Barnsley FC

Barnsley F.C.
2024–25 season
- Owner: BFC Investment Company Ltd
- Chairman: Neerav Parekh
- Head coach: Darrell Clarke (until 12 March); Conor Hourihane (interim), permanent from April 18th.
- Stadium: Oakwell
- League One: 12th
- FA Cup: Second round
- EFL Cup: Third round
- EFL Trophy: Group stage
- Average home league attendance: 12,211
Home colours	Away colours	Third colours

The 2024–25 season is the 138th season in the history of Barnsley Football Club and their third consecutive season in League One. In addition to the domestic league, the club would also participate in the FA Cup, the EFL Cup, and the EFL Trophy.

Prior to the season commencing, Barnsley announced that Luca Connell would be the new club captain, replacing Jordan Williams who joined Portsmouth on a free transfer after his contract expired at the conclusion of 2023/24. The returning Marc Roberts was named the vice-captain for the 2024-2025 season.

2024/25 is the third consecutive season in League One for Barnsley after defeat in the playoffs in the previous two seasons.

Despite battling against comparatively poor form at home, Barnsley competed in and around the top six until the turn of the year, looking well set for a third consecutive playoff campaign.

However form then suffered greatly, and after at one point being several points clear of the teams just outside the playoff positions, found themselves down in tenth, trailing the team in sixth, Huddersfield Town, by six points having played a game more than them, by mid-February.

Given Barnsley failed to bring in sufficient numbers of the desperately needed signings they sought in the winter transfer window, in particular to bolster their centre forward ranks; unless they manage to find options amongst free agents, prospects for the rest of the season seem limited to an upper mid-table finish at best, with even this being far from a guarantee; inevitably meaning a continuation of the season upon season decline they have suffered in recent years.

In March 2025, Barnsley F.C released a club statement to announce that Head Coach Darrell Clarke has left the club. Conor Hourihane will take charge of the first-team until the end of the season. He will be assisted by Jon Stead and Martin Devaney alongside Tom Harban.

The club seem destined to be playing in a fourth successive League One campaign in 2025/26.

== Transfers ==
=== In ===
Date	Pos.	Player	From	Fee	Ref.
1 July 2024 (Note: The transfer was announced on 6 June and would become official on July 1 once his Derby County contract expired)	CM	Conor Hourihane (IRL)	Derby County (ENG)	Free	
3 July 2024	CB	Marc Roberts (ENG)	Birmingham City (ENG)	Free	
9 July 2024	GK	Jackson Smith (ENG)	Walsall (ENG)	Undisclosed	
17 July 2024	CB	Connor Barrett (ENG) (Note: Signed initially for the Under-21s)	Sheffield United (ENG)	Free	
17 July 2024	CM	Callum West (ENG)	Burnley (ENG)	Free	
2 August 2024	LB	Georgie Gent (ENG)	Blackburn Rovers (ENG)	Undisclosed	
12 August 2024	CM	Kelechi Nwakali (NGA)	Chaves (POR)	Undisclosed	
30 August 2024	CF	Stephen Humphrys (ENG)	Wigan Athletic (ENG)	Free	
30 August 2024	AM	Davis Keillor-Dunn (ENG)	Mansfield Town (ENG)	Undisclosed	
3 January 2025	LM	Neil Farrugia (IRL)	Shamrock Rovers (IRL)	Free	
13 February 2025	LW	Jonathan Lewis (USA)	Colorado Rapids (USA)	Free	

=== Out ===
Date	Pos.	Player	To	Fee	Ref.
24 July 2024	CF	Oli Shaw (SCO)	Hamilton Academical (SCO)	Undisclosed	
24 August 2024	LM	Callum Styles (HUN)	West Bromwich Albion (ENG)	Undisclosed	
22 January 2025	CM	Matty Wolfe (ENG)	Sligo Rovers (IRL)	Free	
3 February 2025	GK	Ben Killip (ENG)	Portsmouth (ENG)	Undisclosed	

=== Loaned in ===
Date	Pos.	Player	From	Date until	Ref.
22 July 2024	DM	Matthew Craig (SCO)	Tottenham Hotspur (ENG)	9 January 2025 (Note: On 9 January, Craig was recalled back to Tottenham)	
9 August 2024	GK	Gabriel Slonina (USA)	Chelsea (ENG)	1 January 2025 (Note: On 1 January, Slonina returned to Chelsea early due to injury)	
30 January 2025	GK	Joe Gauci (AUS)	Aston Villa (ENG)	End of Season	
3 February 2025	RB	Dexter Lembikisa (JAM)	Wolverhampton Wanderers (ENG)	End of Season	
3 February 2025	CF	Clément Rodrigues (FRA)	Bastia (FRA)	End of Season	

=== Loaned out ===
Date	Pos.	Player	To	Date until	Ref.
1 July 2024 (Note: The loan was announced on 27 June, and would officially commence on July 1)	CF	Andrew Dallas (SCO)	Barrow (ENG)	15 January 2025 (Note: On 15 January, Dallas was recalled back from his loan at Barrow)	
1 August 2024	CB	Jack Shepherd (ENG)	Bradford City (ENG)	End of Season	
29 August 2024	CB	Kacper Łopata (POL)	Ross County (SCO)	End of Season	
1 October 2024	GK	Jackson Smith (ENG)	Grimsby Town (ENG)	22 October 2024 (Note: On 8 October, 15 and 22 October, Smith's emergency loan at Grimsby was extended by a further 7-days)	
17 January 2025	CF	Aiden Marsh (ENG)	Raith Rovers (SCO)	End of Season	
31 January 2025	CM	Vimal Yoganathan (WAL)	Oldham Athletic (ENG)	End of Season	
31 January 2025	CF	Andrew Dallas (SCO)	Morecambe (ENG)	End of Season	
3 February 2025	CF	Sam Cosgrove (ENG)	Stockport County (ENG)	End of Season	
3 February 2025	RB	Kyran Lofthouse (ENG)	Burton Albion (ENG)	End of Season	

=== Released / Out of Contract ===
Date	Pos.	Player	Subsequent club	Join date	Ref.
30 June 2024	CB	Jordan Williams (ENG)	Portsmouth (ENG)	1 July 2024	
30 June 2024	CM	Herbie Kane (ENG)	Huddersfield Town (ENG)	2 July 2024	
30 June 2024	CM	Joe Ackroyd (ENG)	Guiseley (ENG)	9 July 2024	
30 June 2024	CB	Robbie Cundy (ENG)	Notts County (ENG)	26 July 2024	
30 June 2024	CF	Devante Cole (JAM)	West Bromwich Albion (ENG)	31 July 2024	
30 June 2024	LM	Nicky Cadden (SCO)	Hibernian (SCO)	6 August 2024	
30 June 2024	CF	Mylan Benjamin (MSR)			
30 June 2024	CB	Danny Benson (ENG)	Matlock Town (ENG)	30 August 2024	
30 June 2024	GK	Paul Cooper (ENG)	Buxton (ENG)	24 August 2024	
30 June 2024	CB	Alex Joof (ENG)	Brighouse Town (ENG)	6 September 2024	
30 June 2024	CB	Joshua McKay (ENG)			

== First-team coaches and staff ==
Role	Name
Head Coach	(England) Darrell Clarke
Assistant Head Coach	(Republic of Ireland) Martin Devaney
First-Team Coach	(England) Jon Stead
First-Team Coach	(Republic of Ireland) Conor Hourihane
Goalkeeping Coach	(England) Thomas Fawdry
Head of Sports Science	(England) Matt Cook
Sports Scientist	(England) James Walsh
Head Physiotherapist	(England) Vacant
Club Doctor	(England) Dr John Harban
Performance Analyst	(England) Tom Yeomans
Performance Analyst	(England) Ed Davies
Head of football operations and club secretary	Ann Hough
Academy Manager	(England) Bobby Hassell
U21 Manager	(England) Tom Harban
U18 Manager	(England) Nicky Eaden

== Pre-season and friendlies ==
On 24 May, Barnsley announced their first pre-season friendly, against Accrington Stanley. A month later, the club confirmed their pre-season schedule with fixtures against Alfreton Town, RCD Mallorca and Derby County. On 4 August, a final friendly was confirmed, against Roma.

Win Draw Loss Fixtures

13 July 2024 Friendly	Alfreton Town	1–3	Barnsley	Alfreton
15:00 BST	Salam	Report	Earl; Watters; Dyer	Stadium: North Street

20 July 2024 Friendly	Accrington Stanley	0–3	Barnsley	Accrington
15:00 BST		Report	Phillips; Marsh 70'; Earl	Stadium: Crown Ground

26 July 2024 Friendly	RCD Mallorca	1–0	Barnsley	TBC
12:00 CEST (11:00 BST)	Asano 19'			Stadium: Loughborough University Stadium

31 July 2024 Friendly	Barnsley	v	Derby County	Barnsley
19:45 BST				Stadium: Oakwell

6 August 2024 Friendly	Barnsley	0-4	Roma	Burton upon Trent
17:00 BST			Le Fée 2'; Pisilli 65'; Dybala 68'; M.Soulé 84'	Stadium: St George's Park National Football Centre; Referee: Tom Reeves

== Competitions ==
=== League One ===
==== League table ====
Pos	Team	Pld	W	D	L	GF	GA	GD	Pts
10	Huddersfield Town	46	19	7	20	58	55	+3	64
11	Lincoln City	46	16	13	17	64	56	+8	61
12	Barnsley	46	17	10	19	69	73	−4	61
13	Rotherham United	46	16	11	19	54	59	−5	59
14	Stevenage	46	15	12	19	42	50	−8	57

Source: EFL Official Website
Rules for classification: 1) Points; 2) Goal difference; 3) Number of goals scored; 4) Head-to-head results; 5) Wins; 6) Away goals; 7) Penalty points (sec 9.5); 8) 12-point sending off offences

==== Results summary ====
Overall								Home						Away					
Pld	W	D	L	GF	GA	GD	Pts	W	D	L	GF	GA	GD	W	D	L	GF	GA	GD
46	17	10	19	69	73	−4	61	6	8	9	33	36	−3	11	2	10	36	37	−1

Last updated: 26 April 2025.
Source: Soccerway

==== Matches ====
On 26 June, the League One fixtures were announced.

Win Draw Loss Fixtures

9 August 2024 1	Barnsley	1–2	Mansfield Town	Barnsley
20:00 BST	Connell 32'; Earl (yellow card) 79'	Report	Quinn 13', (yellow card) 25'; Gregory 18'; Pym (yellow card) 66'; Nichols (yellow card) 90+1'	Stadium: Oakwell; Attendance: 14,817; Referee: Ben Toner

17 August 2024 2	Lincoln City	1–2	Barnsley	Lincoln
15:00 BST	House 70'	Report	Cosgrove 13', (yellow card) 90+4'; Roberts 47'; Russell (yellow card) 65'	Stadium: Sincil Bank; Attendance: 9,768; Referee: Martin Coy

24 August 2024 3	Barnsley	2–2	Northampton Town	Barnsley
15:00 BST	Watters 26'; Phillips 46'; Earl (yellow card) 62'; Lofthouse (yellow card) 90+5'	Report	McCarron 73'; Baldwin 78'	Stadium: Oakwell; Attendance: 11,248; Referee: Darren Drysdale

31 August 2024 4	Crawley Town	0–3	Barnsley	Crawley
15:00 BST	Forster (yellow card) 65'; Hepburn-Murphy (yellow card) 65'	Report	Pines 12'; Pines (yellow card) 13'; Phillips 23'; Phillips 45+2' (pen.)	Stadium: Broadfield Stadium; Attendance: 4,704; Referee: Lee Swabey

7 September 2024 5	Barnsley	2–1	Bristol Rovers	Barnsley
15:00 BST	Keillor-Dunn 11'; Earl (yellow card) 57'; Phillips 65'; O'Keeffe (yellow card) 90+2'; Connell (yellow card) 90+3'; Roberts (yellow card) 90+6'	Report	Sotiriou 37'	Stadium: Oakwell; Attendance: 11,196; Referee: Edward Duckworth

14 September 2024 6	Stevenage	3–0	Barnsley	Stevenage
15:00 BST	List 54', 89'; Piergianni 59'; White (yellow card) 61'; Phillips (yellow card) 78'; Freestone (yellow card) 82'; Thompson (yellow card) 86'	Report	de Gevigney (yellow card) 64'; O'Keeffe (yellow card) 79'	Stadium: Broadhall Way; Attendance: 4,206; Referee: Jacob Miles

21 September 2024 7	Burton Albion	1–2	Barnsley	Burton upon Trent
15:00 BST	Vancooten (yellow card) 67'; Cooper Love 88'; Akoto (yellow card) 90+6'	Report	Earl (yellow card) 3'; de Gevigney (yellow card) 20'; Connell 36'; Humphrys 90'	Stadium: Pirelli Stadium; Attendance: 3,711; Referee: Dean Whitestone

28 September 2024 8	Barnsley	1–1	Stockport County	Barnsley
19:45 BST	Phillips 4' (pen.); de Gevigney (yellow card) 18'; Connell (yellow card) 74'; Benson (yellow card) 85'	Report	Onyango (yellow card) 19'; Barry 90+1'	Stadium: Oakwell; Attendance: 14,882; Referee: Declan Bourne
Note: Fixture was initially scheduled for a 15:00 kick-off, but was moved for live Sky Sports broadcast.

1 October 2024 9	Barnsley	2–2	Wycombe Wanderers	Barnsley
19:45 GMT	Humphrys 58'; Jaló (yellow card) 63'; Roberts 89'	Report	Lubala 47'; Taylor (yellow card) 75'; Low (yellow card) 78'; Kone 85', (yellow card) 90+5'	Stadium: Oakwell; Attendance: 9,857; Referee: Ross Joyce

5 October 2024 10	Huddersfield Town	2–0	Barnsley	Huddersfield
12:30 GMT	Hodge (yellow card) 12'; Marshall (yellow card) 62'; Kane (yellow card) 74'; Wiles 83'; Spencer (yellow card) 90'; Kasumu 90+6'	Report	Keillor-Dunn (yellow card) 48'; Jaló (yellow card) 70'	Stadium: Kirklees Stadium; Attendance: 19,523; Referee: David Rock
Note: Fixture was initially scheduled for a 15:00 kick-off, but was moved for live Sky Sports broadcast.

19 October 2024 12	Blackpool	1–2	Barnsley	Blackpool
15:00 GMT				Stadium: Bloomfield Road

22 October 2024 13	Barnsley	2–2	Charlton Athletic	Barnsley
19:45 GMT	Roberts (yellow card) 22'; Keillor-Dunn 34'; Earl (yellow card) 70'; Connell (yellow card) 71'; Watters 90+5'	Report	Edmonds-Green (yellow card) 15'; Berry 77', 90+3'	Stadium: Oakwell; Attendance: 12,441; Referee: Lewis Smith

26 October 2024 14	Shrewsbury Town	0–2	Barnsley	Shrewsbury
15:00 GMT	Nsiala (yellow card) 90+2'	Report	Pines (yellow card) 44'; Russell 45+2'; Watters 47'	Stadium: New Meadow; Attendance: 6,129; Referee: Adam Herczeg

8 November 2024 15	Barnsley	2–0	Rotherham United	Barnsley
19:15 GMT	Russell 32'; Humphrys 86'; Connell (yellow card) 89'	Report	Kelly (yellow card) 76'	Stadium: Oakwell; Attendance: 14,731; Referee: Thomas Kirk
Note: Fixture was initially scheduled for 9 November, but was moved for live Sky Sports broadcast. It was then later moved again to avoid a possilbe postponement due to international call-ups.

16 November 2024 16	Cambridge United	1–1	Barnsley	Cambridge
15:00 GMT	Nlundulu 4'; Njoku (yellow card) 49'; Bennett (yellow card) 71'; Loft (yellow card) 75'	Report	Humphrys (yellow card) 16', (goal) 17'; Gent (yellow card) 17'; Russell (yellow card) 51'	Stadium: Abbey Stadium; Attendance: 6,817; Referee: Seb Stockbridge

23 November 2024 17	Barnsley	0–1	Wigan Athletic	Barnsley
15:00 GMT	Pines (yellow card) 61'; Connell (yellow card) 65'	Report	Aasgaard 42'; Sibbick (yellow card) 64'; Smith (yellow card) 66'; Robinson (yellow card) 90+7'	Stadium: Oakwell; Attendance: 11,438; Referee: Tom Reeves

26 November 2024 11	Barnsley	2–2	Reading	Barnsley
19:45 GMT	Keillor-Dunn 7'; Phillips (yellow card) 49'; Earl 72'	Report	Smith 50', 66'	Stadium: Oakwell; Attendance: 10,011; Referee: Zac Kennard-Kettle
Note: Fixture was originally scheduled for 12 October, but was postponed due to international call-ups in the Reading squad.

3 December 2024 18	Wrexham	1–0	Barnsley	Wrexham
19:45 GMT	McClean (yellow card) 72'; Dobson (yellow card) 75'; James (yellow card) 86'; Rathbone 90+2'	Report	Russell (yellow card) 47'; O'Keeffe (yellow card) 72'; Connell (yellow card) 85'	Stadium: Racecourse Ground; Attendance: 12,386; Referee: Ben Speedie

7 December 2024 19	Barnsley	1–2	Birmingham City	Barnsley
15:00 GMT	Connell (yellow card) 15'; O'Keeffe (yellow card) 23'; Phillips (yellow card) 38' (yellow-red card) 70'; Paik Seung-ho 58' (o.g.); Cosgrove (yellow card) 83'	Report	Harris (yellow card) 31'; Stansfield 60', 79'; Laird (yellow card) 87'; Gardner-Hickman (yellow card) 90+4'	Stadium: Oakwell; Attendance: 15,367; Referee: Thomas Parsons

14 December 2024 20	Exeter City	1–2	Barnsley	Exeter
15:00 GMT	Magennis 13'	Report	McCarthy (yellow card) 11'; Nwakali 49'; Keillor-Dunn 58'; Pines (yellow card) 90+1'; Lofthouse (yellow card) 90+3'	Stadium: St James Park; Attendance: 5,669; Referee: Scott Tallis

21 December 2024 21	Barnsley	0–4	Leyton Orient	Barnsley
15:00 GMT		Report	Donley 6'; Currie (yellow card) 20'; Beckles 28'; Kelman 51'; Pratley (yellow card) 84'; O'Neill (yellow card) 88'; Perkins 90+3'	Stadium: Oakwell; Attendance: 11,373; Referee: Dale Baines

26 December 2024 22	Bolton Wanderers	1–2	Barnsley	Horwich
15:00 GMT	Lolos 26', (yellow card) 58'; Thomason (yellow card) 75'; Williams (yellow card) 75'; Charles (yellow card) 90'	Report	McCarthy (yellow card) 42'; Cotter (yellow card) 76'; Keillor-Dunn 80'; Nwakali (yellow card) 85'; Phillips 89'; Yoganathan (yellow card) 90+4'	Stadium: Toughsheet Community Stadium; Attendance: 22,215; Referee: Thomas Kirk

29 December 2024 23	Peterborough United	1–3	Barnsley	Peterborough
15:00 GMT	Mothersille 74'; Mills (red card) 81'	Report	Pines (yellow card) 29', (goal) 47'; Keillor-Dunn 55'; Russell 86'; O'Keeffe (yellow card) 88'	Stadium: London Road Stadium; Referee: Alex Chilowicz

1 January 2025 24	Barnsley	2–1	Wrexham	Barnsley
15:00 GMT	Keillor-Dunn 11'; Phillips 24'; McCarthy (yellow card) 82'; O'Keeffe (yellow card) 87'; Killip (yellow card) 90+5'	Report	Cleworth 80'	Stadium: Oakwell; Attendance: 15,248; Referee: Ben Toner

4 January 2025 25	Barnsley	3–0	Crawley Town	Barnsley
15:00 GMT	Russell 11'; Gent (yellow card) 45+1'; Watters 51'; Keillor-Dunn 54'; McCarthy (yellow card) 64'; Cosgrove (yellow card) 90+3'	Report	John-Jules (yellow card) 45+1'; Barker (yellow card) 90+3'	Stadium: Oakwell; Attendance: 11,016; Referee: Gavin Ward

18 January 2025 27	Bristol Rovers	3–1	Barnsley	Horfield
15:00 GMT	O'Donkor 41'; Hutchinson 52'; Wilson (yellow card) 66'; Sotiriou 85'	Report	Earl 67'	Stadium: Memorial Stadium; Attendance: 7,638; Referee: Martin Woods

25 January 2025 28	Barnsley	0–1	Stevenage	Barnsley
15:00 GMT	McCarthy (yellow card) 89'	Report	Phillips (yellow card) 56'; Goode (yellow card) 86'; Kemp 90+2'	Stadium: Oakwell; Attendance: 10,831; Referee: Ross Joyce

28 January 2025 29	Wycombe Wanderers	2–1	Barnsley	High Wycombe
19:45 GMT	Leahy (yellow card) 5'; Bakinson (yellow card) 50'; Kone 65', 90+5'; Lubala (yellow card) 90+10'	Report	Russell 10'; O'Keeffe (yellow card) 59'; Killip (yellow card) 62'; Roberts (red card) 66'; Humphrys (yellow card) 75'; Connell (yellow card) 90+9'	Stadium: Adams Park; Attendance: 3,803; Referee: Darren Drysdale

1 February 2025 30	Barnsley	0–0	Burton Albion	Barnsley
12:30 GMT	de Gevigney (yellow card) 81'	Report	Armer (yellow card) 82'; McKiernan (yellow card) 90+2'	Stadium: Oakwell; Attendance: 10,555; Referee: Sunny Singh Gill
Note: Fixture was initially scheduled for a 15:00 kick-off, but was moved due to live Sky Sports broadcasting.

8 February 2025 31	Stockport County	2–1	Barnsley	Edgeley
12:30 GMT	Olaofe 31'; Collar 35' (pen.)	Report	Keillor-Dunn 90'	Stadium: Edgeley Park; Attendance: 10,148; Referee: Jacob Miles
Note: Fixture was initially scheduled for a 15:00 kick-off, but was moved due to live Sky Sports broadcasting.

15 February 2025 32	Barnsley	1–2	Huddersfield Town	Barnsley
15:00 GMT	Russell 14'; Farrugia (yellow card) 39'; Keillor-Dunn (yellow card) 49'; Earl (yellow card) 87'	Report	Kasumu (yellow card) 45'; Koroma 59'; Wiles 61'; Spencer (yellow card) 72'	Stadium: Oakwell; Attendance: 15,600; Referee: David Rock

22 February 2025 33	Rotherham United	0–1	Barnsley	Rotherham
12:30 GMT	Wilks (yellow card) 90+6'	Report	Phillips 52' (pen.); Connell (yellow card) 72'	Stadium: New York Stadium; Attendance: 10,755; Referee: Oliver Yates
Note: Fixture was initially scheduled for a 15:00 kick-off, but was moved due to live Sky Sports broadcasting.

25 February 2025 26	Northampton Town	1–2	Barnsley	Sixfields
19:45 GMT	Costelloe (yellow card) 68'; Hoskins 78'	Report	Keillor-Dunn 36', 59'; Humphrys (yellow card) 73'; Earl (yellow card) 76'; Nwakali (yellow card) 86'; de Gevigney (red card) 87'	Stadium: Sixfields Stadium; Attendance: 5,817; Referee: Declan Bourne
Note: Fixture was originally scheduled for 11 January, but was postponed due to a frozen pitch.

1 March 2025 34	Barnsley	4–3	Lincoln City	Barnsley
15:00 GMT	Keillor-Dunn 14'; O'Keeffe (yellow card) 25'; Phillips 33'; Gent 53'; Watters 76'	Report	Jefferies (yellow card) 63'; Darikwa 67'; Hackett 84'; Makama 90+2'	Stadium: Oakwell; Attendance: 11,914; Referee: Scott Oldham

4 March 2025 35	Charlton Athletic	1–0	Barnsley	Charlton
19:45 GMT	Gillesphey 12'; Edwards (yellow card) 39'	Report		Stadium: The Valley; Attendance: 12,707; Referee: Carl Brook

8 March 2025 36	Barnsley	0–3	Blackpool	Barnsley
15:00 GMT		Report	Carey 56', 73'; Fletcher 64'	Stadium: Oakwell; Attendance: 11,563; Referee: Benjamin Speedie

15 March 2025 37	Mansfield Town	2–1	Barnsley	Mansfield
15:00 GMT	Vickers 11'; Oshilaja 90'	Report	Benson 54'	Stadium: Field Mill; Attendance: 8,592; Referee: Tom Reeves

22 March 2025 38	Barnsley	1–1	Cambridge United	Barnsley
15:00 GMT	de Gevigney (yellow card) 55'; Lewis 90+2'; Nwakali (yellow card) 90+4'; Russell (yellow card) 90+5'	Report	Brophy 9'; Malone (yellow card) 45+1'; Stevenson (yellow card) 49'; Gibbons (yellow card) 77'; Morrison (yellow card) 90+5'	Stadium: Oakwell; Attendance: 10,790; Referee: Richard Eley

29 March 2025 39	Wigan Athletic	1–1	Barnsley	Wigan
15:00 GMT	Dale (yellow card) 37'; Tickle (yellow card) 45+2'; Asamoah 77'; Kerr (yellow card) 83'	Report	Keillor-Dunn 8'; Jaló (yellow card) 45+2'; McCarthy (yellow card) 89'	Stadium: Brick Community Stadium; Attendance: 10,942; Referee: Seb Stockbridge

1 April 2025 40	Barnsley	1–2	Exeter City	Barnsley
19:45 BST	Nwakali (yellow card) 33'; de Gevigney (yellow card) 42'; Humphrys 58'	Report	Trevitt 13'; Watts (yellow card) 45'; Magennis 81'	Stadium: Oakwell; Attendance: 10,092; Referee: Will Finnie

5 April 2025 41	Birmingham City	6–2	Barnsley	Bordesley
15:00 BST	Stansfield 33' (pen.); May 47', 55'; Klarer (yellow card) 54'; Harris 72'; Dowell 82'; Jutkiewicz 89'	Report	de Gevigney (red card) 3'; Keillor-Dunn 35'; Humphrys 59'; Bland (yellow card) 76'	Stadium: St Andrew's; Attendance: 25,018; Referee: Sam Purkiss

12 April 2025 42	Barnsley	4–1	Bolton Wanderers	Barnsley
15:00 BST	Russell 15', 86', (yellow card) 74'; Keillor-Dunn (yellow card) 22'; Jaló 25', 71'; Connell (yellow card) 66'	Report	Collins 74'; Dempsey (yellow card) 85'; Lolos (yellow card) 90+2'	Stadium: Oakwell; Attendance: 13,685; Referee: Elliot Bell

18 April 2025 43	Leyton Orient	4–3	Barnsley	Leyton
15:00 BST	Galbraith 51'; Williams (yellow card) 63'; Kelman 68'; Clare 72'; Beckles 74'	Report	Humphrys 11', 19'; Roberts (yellow card) 31'; Phillips (yellow card) 35'; Bland (yellow card) 40'; Keillor-Dunn 64'	Stadium: Brisbane Road; Attendance: 8,410; Referee: Leigh Doughty

21 April 2025 44	Barnsley	1–1	Peterborough United	Barnsley
15:00 BST	Connell (yellow card) 43'; Russell 45+1'; Bland (yellow card) 90+4'	Report	Jones 17'; Hughes (yellow card) 90+11'	Stadium: Oakwell; Attendance: 11,049; Referee: Andrew Humphries

26 April 2025 45	Barnsley	1–2	Shrewsbury Town	Barnsley
15:00 BST	Russell 78'	Report	Marquis 18', 67'; Nurse (yellow card) 29'	Stadium: Oakwell; Attendance: 11,159; Referee: Scott Tallis

3 May 2025 46	Reading	2–4	Barnsley	Reading
15:00 BST	Yiadom (yellow card) 60'; Wing 67'; Bodin 90+4'	Report	Humphrys 52'; Russell 57' (yellow card) 76'; Connell (yellow card) 76'; Keillor-Dunn 79', 85'	Stadium: Select Car Leasing Stadium; Attendance: 21,481; Referee: Carl Brook

=== FA Cup ===
Barnsley were drawn away to Port Vale in the first round and at home to Bristol Rovers in the second round.

Win Draw Loss Fixtures

2 November 2024 First round	Port Vale	1–3	Barnsley	Burslem
15:00 GMT	Cover (yellow card) 16'; Curtis 31'; Debrah (yellow card) 82'	Report	Roberts 17'; Connell (yellow card) 43'; Keillor-Dunn 64'; Phillips 82' (pen.); O'Keeffe (yellow card) 84'	Stadium: Vale Park; Attendance: 5,128; Referee: Charles Breakspear

30 November 2024 Second round	Barnsley	0–0 (3–4 p)	Bristol Rovers	Barnsley
15:00 GMT		Report		Stadium: Oakwell; Attendance: 4,801; Referee: Scott Oldham
	Penalties
	Phillips (penalty missed); Cosgrove (penalty scored); Russell (penalty scored); Jaló (penalty scored); Earl (penalty missed)		(penalty scored) Martin; (penalty scored) Sotiriou; (penalty scored) Sinclair; (penalty scored) Forde

=== EFL Cup ===
On 27 June, the draw for the first round was made, with Barnsley being drawn away against Wigan Athletic. In the second round, they were drawn at home to Sheffield United. In the third round an away tie against Manchester United was confirmed.

Win Draw Loss Fixtures

13 August 2024 First round	Wigan Athletic	1–1 (2–4 p)	Barnsley	Wigan
19:45 BST	Carragher (yellow card) 21'; Aasgaard 35' (pen.)	Report	Yoganathan (yellow card) 17'; Pines 48'; Cotter (yellow card) 55'	Stadium: Brick Community Stadium; Attendance: 1,990; Referee: Will Finnie
	Penalties
	Aasgaard (penalty missed); Jones (penalty scored); Stones (penalty missed); McHugh (penalty scored)		(penalty scored) Phillips; (penalty missed) Connell; (penalty scored) Earl; (penalty scored) Watters; (penalty scored) Russell

27 August 2024 Second round	Barnsley	1–0	Sheffield United	Barnsley
19:45 BST	De Gevigney (yellow card) 27'; Watters 52'	Report	Marsh (yellow card) 39'	Stadium: Oakwell; Attendance: 10,739; Referee: Tom Reeves

17 September 2024 Third round	Manchester United	7–0	Barnsley	Trafford
20:00 BST	Rashford 16', 58'; Antony 35' (pen.); Garnacho 45+2', 49'; Eriksen 81', 85'	Report	Slonina (yellow card) 34'; Humphrys (yellow card) 72'; O'Keeffe (yellow card) 90+3'	Stadium: Old Trafford; Referee: Gavin Ward

=== EFL Trophy ===
In the group stage, Barnsley were drawn into Northern Group F alongside Doncaster Rovers, Huddersfield Town and Manchester United U21.

Pos	Div	Team	Pld	W	PW	PL	L	GF	GA	GD	Pts	Qualification
1	L2	Doncaster Rovers	3	2	0	1	0	8	5	+3	7	Advance to Round 2
2	L1	Huddersfield Town	3	2	0	0	1	7	3	+4	6	Advance to Round 2
3	ACA	Manchester United U21	3	1	1	0	1	7	9	−2	5	
4	L1	Barnsley	3	0	0	0	3	3	8	−5	0	

Source: EFL

Win Draw Loss Fixtures

20 August 2024 Group Stage	Barnsley	2–3	Manchester United U21	Barnsley
19:00 BST	Yoganathan 10', 37', (yellow card) 86'; Bland (yellow card) 90'; O'Keeffe (red card) 90+2'	Report	Fredricson (yellow card) 35'; Ennis 81'; Fletcher 84', 87'	Stadium: Oakwell; Attendance: 2,638; Referee: Mark Ryder

8 October 2024 Group stage	Huddersfield Town	2–0	Barnsley	Huddersfield
19:45 BST	Ladapo 59'; Kane (yellow card) 70'; Ward 90+1'	Report	McCarthy (yellow card) 26'; Marsh (yellow card) 54'; Pines (red card) 83'; Humphrys (yellow card) 86'	Stadium: Kirklees Stadium; Attendance: 2,182; Referee: Michael Salisbury

29 October 2024 Group stage	Barnsley	1–3	Doncaster Rovers	Barnsley
19:00 GMT	Bland (yellow card) 45'; Marsh 78'	Report	Ironside 45+1'; Anderson (yellow card) 47'; Fleming (yellow card) 67'; Clifton 72'; Hurst 84'	Stadium: Oakwell; Attendance: 1,813; Referee: Elliot Bell

== Statistics ==
=== Appearances and goals ===
As of match played 26 April 2025

Players with no appearances are not included on the list
Italics indicate a loaned in player

No.	Pos	Nat	Player	Total		League One		FA Cup		EFL Cup		EFL Trophy	
No.	Pos	Nat	Player	Apps	Goals	Apps	Goals	Apps	Goals	Apps	Goals	Apps	Goals
2	DF	(Republic of Ireland) IRL	Barry Cotter	25	0	13+7	0	0+1	0	3+0	0	1+0	0
3	MF	(Jamaica) JAM	Jon Russell	45	10	33+6	10	1+1	0	1+1	0	2+0	0
4	DF	(England) ENG	Marc Roberts	40	4	34+2	3	2+0	1	2+0	0	0+0	0
5	DF	(United States) USA	Donovan Pines	27	3	17+7	2	0+0	0	2+0	1	1+0	0
6	DF	(France) FRA	Maël de Gevigney	43	0	38+0	0	2+0	0	3+0	0	0+0	0
7	DF	(Republic of Ireland) IRL	Corey O'Keeffe	45	0	35+5	0	2+0	0	1+1	0	1+0	0
8	MF	(England) ENG	Adam Phillips	40	10	34+1	9	1+1	1	2+1	0	0+0	0
9	FW	(England) ENG	Sam Cosgrove	22	1	8+11	1	0+1	0	1+1	0	0+0	0
10	MF	(England) ENG	Josh Benson	17	1	2+12	1	0+0	0	0+0	0	3+0	0
11	FW	(Portugal) POR	Fábio Jaló	19	2	5+11	2	0+1	0	1+0	0	1+0	0
12	GK	(England) ENG	Jackson Smith	6	0	5+1	0	0+0	0	0+0	0	0+0	0
14	FW	(United States) USA	Jonathan Lewis	5	1	0+5	1	0+0	0	0+0	0	0+0	0
15	DF	(England) ENG	Kyran Lofthouse	24	0	3+14	0	0+1	0	0+3	0	3+0	0
17	DF	(England) ENG	Georgie Gent	30	1	19+6	1	2+0	0	1+0	0	2+0	0
18	GK	(Australia) AUS	Joe Gauci	6	0	6+0	0	0+0	0	0+0	0	0+0	0
19	FW	(England) ENG	Aiden Marsh	12	1	0+7	0	0+0	0	2+0	0	2+1	1
20	DF	(Jamaica) JAM	Dexter Lembikisa	11	0	2+9	0	0+0	0	0+0	0	0+0	0
21	DF	(Republic of Ireland) IRL	Conor McCarthy	24	0	16+4	0	0+0	0	0+1	0	3+0	0
22	MF	(Republic of Ireland) IRL	Neil Farrugia	9	0	6+3	0	0+0	0	0+0	0	0+0	0
28	MF	(England) ENG	Callum West	1	0	0+0	0	0+0	0	0+0	0	0+1	0
29	DF	(Republic of Ireland) IRL	Connor Barratt	8	0	1+4	0	0+0	0	0+0	0	1+2	0
30	MF	(Wales) WAL	Jonathan Bland	11	0	5+3	0	0+0	0	0+0	0	2+1	0
31	MF	(England) ENG	Harrison Nejman	1	0	0+0	0	0+0	0	0+0	0	0+1	0
32	DF	(England) ENG	Josh Earl	38	2	33+0	2	2+0	0	3+0	0	0+0	0
33	FW	(France) FRA	Clément Rodrigues	6	0	2+4	0	0+0	0	0+0	0	0+0	0
34	DF	(England) ENG	Oliver Wilkinson	1	0	0+0	0	0+0	0	0+0	0	1+0	0
35	DF	(Poland) POL	Kacper Łopata	2	0	0+0	0	0+0	0	0+1	0	1+0	0
36	FW	(England) ENG	Max Watters	33	6	18+11	5	1+0	0	2+1	1	0+0	0
40	MF	(England) ENG	Davis Keillor-Dunn	43	17	41+0	16	2+0	1	0+0	0	0+0	0
41	MF	(Northern Ireland) NIR	Bayley McCann	3	0	0+1	0	0+0	0	0+0	0	1+1	0
42	FW	(England) ENG	Luke Alker	1	0	0+0	0	0+0	0	0+0	0	0+1	0
43	FW	(Montserrat) MSR	Josiah Dyer	3	0	0+1	0	0+0	0	0+0	0	0+2	0
44	FW	(England) ENG	Stephen Humphrys	40	8	25+11	8	2+0	0	0+1	0	1+0	0
45	MF	(Wales) WAL	Vimal Yoganathan	10	2	1+4	0	0+0	0	3+0	0	2+0	2
47	MF	(England) ENG	Ziggy Kozluk	1	0	0+0	0	0+0	0	0+0	0	0+1	0
48	MF	(Republic of Ireland) IRL	Luca Connell	45	2	36+4	2	2+0	0	2+1	0	0+0	0
50	MF	(Nigeria) NGR	Kelechi Nwakali	26	1	12+11	1	1+0	0	0+0	0	2+0	0
51	GK	(England) ENG	Kieran Flavell	8	0	6+1	0	0+0	0	0+0	0	1+0	0
Player(s) who featured whilst on loan but returned to parent club during the season:
1	GK	(United States) USA	Gabriel Slonina	14	0	11+0	0	0+0	0	3+0	0	0+0	0
18	MF	(Scotland) SCO	Matthew Craig	16	0	10+4	0	0+0	0	1+1	0	0+0	0
Player(s) who featured but departed the club permanently during the season:
14	MF	(Republic of Ireland) IRL	Conor Hourihane	2	0	1+1	0	0+0	0	0+0	0	0+0	0
23	GK	(England) ENG	Ben Killip	21	0	17+0	0	2+0	0	0+0	0	2+0	0
