= Conor Hourihane =

Irish footballer (born 1991)

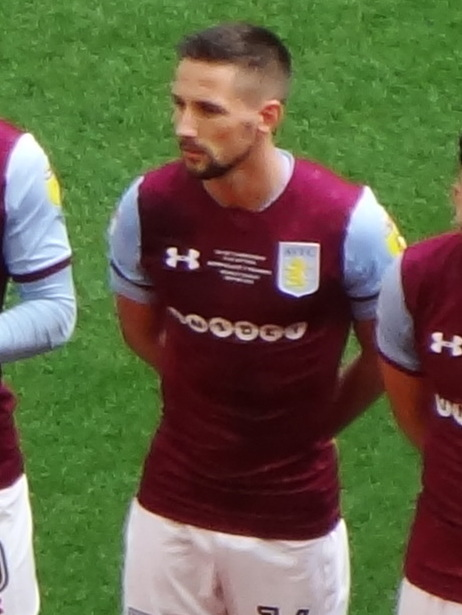
- Hourihane with Aston Villa in 2018

Personal information
- Full name: Conor Geraroid Hourihane
- Date of birth: 2 February 1991 (age 35)
- Place of birth: Bandon, County Cork, Ireland
- Height: 1.80 m (5 ft 11 in)
- Position: Central midfielder

Youth career
- 2007–2009: Sunderland

Senior career*
Years	Team	Apps	(Gls)
2009–2010	Sunderland	0	(0)
2010–2011	Ipswich Town	0	(0)
2011–2014	Plymouth Argyle	125	(15)
2014–2017	Barnsley	112	(29)
2017–2022	Aston Villa	132	(23)
2021	→ Swansea City (loan)	19	(5)
2021–2022	→ Sheffield United (loan)	29	(1)
2022–2024	Derby County	85	(12)
2024	Barnsley	2	(0)
Total		504	(85)

International career
2009–2010	Republic of Ireland U19	14	(0)
2010–2012	Republic of Ireland U21	8	(1)
2017–2022	Republic of Ireland	36	(1)

Managerial career
- 2025–2026: Barnsley
- * Club domestic league appearances and goals

Conor Geraroid Hourihane (/ˈhaʊˌrɪhən/) (born 2 February 1991) is an Irish football coach and former player who played as a midfielder. He was most recently the assistant manager of EFL League One club Leicester City.

During his career as a player, he played for Aston Villa, Plymouth Argyle, Sunderland, Ipswich Town, Derby County, and Barnsley. He also played on loan for Swansea City and Sheffield United.

Internationally, he represented the Republic of Ireland at senior level, as well as at under-19 and under-21 levels.

== Club career ==
=== Early career ===
Hourihane came through the youth team of Sunderland, and stayed with the Black Cats until 2010 when his contract expired. He was offered a new deal by Sunderland but chose to sign for his idol Roy Keane's Football League Championship side Ipswich Town, who had to offer compensation for the deal. Hourihane failed to make an appearance for Ipswich in the 2010–11 season.

=== Plymouth Argyle ===
He signed for Football League Two side Plymouth Argyle on 30 July 2011 on a free transfer after being released by Ipswich and impressing on trial. He made his professional debut on 6 August 2011, in the opening day draw with Shrewsbury Town at the New Meadow. On 15 October, Hourihane scored his first goal for Plymouth in a 3–2 win over Dagenham & Redbridge. He became the club's captain during the 2012–13 season following the departure of Darren Purse to Port Vale and signed a new two-year contract in May 2013. Hourihane impressed for Plymouth in the 2013–14 season, starting 53 games and missing only one match all season because of suspension, scoring nine goals in the process.

=== Barnsley ===
Hourihane joined Barnsley on 23 June 2014 for a fee of £250,000, signing a three-year contract with the Tykes. He earned the League One Player of the Month award for August 2014, after making an impressive start to his Barnsley career. Hourihane became captain of the club in December 2015.

Hourihane and his teammates won two trophies at Wembley Stadium in London, during the 2015–2016 season: The first visit to Wembley was on 3 April 2016 for the Football League Trophy, in which Barnsley won 3–2 in the League Trophy final, after beating Oxford United of League Two. The second visit to Wembley was on 29 May 2016, for the Football League One play-offs final. Barnsley won promotion to the Championship, after beating Millwall 3–1 in the Play-off final.

Hourihane and Barnsley had a highly successful start to life in the Championship, winning five out of their first seven games, including 4–0 wins against Rotherham and Wolverhampton Wanderers, and with Hourihane scoring three goals in these first seven games and assisting a further five. He went on to win the Championship Player of the Month for August 2016.

Despite speculation linking Hourihane with Aston Villa on 21 January 2017, Hourihane captained Barnsley to a 3–2 victory against Leeds United with Hourihane scoring the match winning goal with a free-kick.

On 26 January 2017, it was confirmed that Hourihane had left Barnsley to sign for Championship rivals Aston Villa for an undisclosed fee. Both Hourihane and Barnsley released a statement, the player thanking the fans and commenting that Barnsley "will always have a special place in my heart".

=== Aston Villa ===
On 26 January 2017, Hourihane joined Aston Villa on a three-and-a-half-year deal. Hourihane made 17 appearances as Villa finished the season in 13th place, scoring his first Villa goal against Bristol City in February. He scored his first hat trick for the club in a 4–2 victory at home against Norwich City in August 2017.

Hourihane signed a new three-year deal in the summer of 2019 as a reward for helping the side win promotion to the Premier League. On 5 October 2019, he scored his first Premier League goal in a 5–1 away victory over Norwich City – which meant that he had scored in all four levels of the English football league.

On 10 June 2022, Hourihane was released by Aston Villa at the end of his contract.

Loans to Swansea and Sheffield United

On 20 January 2021, Hourihane joined Championship side Swansea City on loan for the remainder of the 2020–21 season. On 23 January 2021, Hourihane made his Swansea debut, in a 5–1 FA Cup victory over Nottingham Forest with a performance that was described as "excellent" by Swansea manager Steve Cooper. In his second appearance, and his league debut, he scored his first goal for the club in a 1–1 draw with Brentford on 27 January 2021.

On 30 August 2021, Hourihane joined Championship side Sheffield United on loan for the 2021–22 season.

=== Derby County ===
On 6 July 2022, Hourihane joined recently relegated League One club Derby County on a two-year deal as a free agent. Hourihane, made 51 appearances for the club during the 2022–23 season and with 7 goals and 10 assists in the league he was Derby's only representative in the League One team of the season.

Ahead of the 2023–24 season, Hourihane was named the captain of Derby County on 3 August 2023, after winning the vote from the first-team squad. There were mixed fortunes for Hourihane at the start of his first season as captain with a low-light being Derby's 1–0 loss at Shrewsbury Town on 21 October 2023, where he scored the decisive own goal from defending a cross. At the end of the match, Houirhane went over to the angry visiting fans saying he was "trying his best", he also stated frustration in the dressing room over poor performances.

This game though would be prove to be a turning point Derby's season, as form started to improve and Derby started to climb up the table, with Hourihane scoring winning goals in two matches, 3–2 against Burton Albion on 15 January 2024 and 2–1 to Reading on 12 March 2024. as Derby moved to second in the league table, Hourihane stated that getting promotion for Derby would be the "fairytale story".

For the final six games of the season, Hourihane lost his place in the starting 11 as Nathaniel Mendez-Laing became on the pitch captain for the team during the promotion run-in. On 27 April 2024, Derby secured automatic promotion to the Championship as runners-up of League One and Hourihane lifted the promotion trophy, he made 47 appearances for Derby during the season, with six goals. In the league he made 41 appearances and scored five times.

On 18 May 2024, it was announced that Hourihane would leave Derby at the end of his contract on 30 June 2024, after 98 appearances and 13 goals over two seasons.

=== Return to Barnsley ===
Hourihane returned to Barnsley on 6 June 2024 as a player-coach, on what was described as a 'multi-year deal'. On 20 December, he retired from professional football, taking up the role of assistant head coach at the club. On 13 March 2025, following the firing of Darrell Clarke, Hourihane was appointed as Barnsley head coach until 2027 with an option for a 3rd.

== International career ==
On 28 March 2017, Hourihane made his senior international debut, starting in a 1–0 friendly defeat against Iceland at the Aviva Stadium. Hourihane won his second cap in a friendly against Mexico on 2 June 2017. On 26 March 2019, Hourihane scored his first senior international goal in a 1–0 win over Georgia at the Aviva Stadium.

The Republic of Ireland's first home match in Euro 2020 qualifying received additional coverage due to a protest against the former CEO of the Football Association of Ireland (FAI), John Delaney. A portion of the Republic of Ireland supporters threw tennis balls on the pitch during the 33rd minute to express their discontent at Delaney remaining part of the FAI hierarchy.

== Coaching career ==
In 2020, Hourihane started working towards his coaching qualifications. In June 2023, he announced that he would be joining the Aston Villa Academy in September as a coach for the Under-16s team, alongside playing for Derby.

=== Barnsley ===
In June 2024, it was announced on his return to Barnsley that he would combine his playing role with that of first team coach, linking up with head coach Darrell Clarke and existing first team coach Martin Devaney. On 12 March 2025, following the sacking of Clarke, Hourihane was appointed interim head coach until the end of the season. On 18 April, he was appointed on a permanent two-year deal.

Hourihane was named EFL League One Manager of the Month for November 2025 after seven points from three unbeaten matches.

On 18 April 2026, the club announced that Hourihane would mutually part ways with the club following the conclusion of the 2025–26 season.

=== Leicester City ===
On 30 June 2026, Hourihane joined League One club Leicester City as assistant to new manager Russell Martin. On 5 November 2026, he left his role at the club.

== Personal life ==
Hourihane is the second cousin of Republic of Ireland goalkeeper Marie Hourihan.

== Career statistics ==
=== Club ===
Appearances and goals by club, season and competition
Club	Season	League			FA Cup		League Cup		Other		Total	
Club	Season	Division	Apps	Goals	Apps	Goals	Apps	Goals	Apps	Goals	Apps	Goals
Sunderland	2009–10	Premier League	0	0	0	0	0	0	—		0	0
Ipswich Town	2010–11	Championship	0	0	0	0	0	0	—		0	0
Plymouth Argyle	2011–12	League Two	38	2	2	0	1	0	1 (Note: Appearances in Football League Trophy)	0	42	2
Plymouth Argyle	2012–13	League Two	42	5	1	0	2	0	2	0	47	5
Plymouth Argyle	2013–14	League Two	45	8	5	1	1	0	2	0	53	9
Plymouth Argyle	Total		125	15	8	1	4	0	5	0	142	16
Barnsley	2014–15	League One	46	13	4	1	1	0	2	0	53	14
Barnsley	2015–16	League One	41	10	1	0	2	0	9 (Note: Six appearances one goal in Football League Trophy; three appearances in League One play-offs)	1	53	11
Barnsley	2016–17	Championship	25	6	2	0	1	0	—		28	6
Barnsley	Total		112	29	7	1	4	0	11	1	134	31
Aston Villa	2016–17	Championship	17	1	0	0	0	0	—		17	1
Aston Villa	2017–18	Championship	41	11	1	0	1	0	3 (Note: Appearances in Championship play-offs)	0	46	11
Aston Villa	2018–19	Championship	43	7	0	0	2	1	3	1	48	9
Aston Villa	2019–20	Premier League	27	3	1	0	6	4	—		34	7
Aston Villa	2020–21	Premier League	4	1	0	0	1	0	—		5	1
Aston Villa	2021–22	Premier League	0	0	0	0	1	0	—		1	0
Aston Villa	Total		132	23	2	0	11	5	6	1	151	29
Swansea City (loan)	2020–21	Championship	19	5	2	0	0	0	3	0	24	5
Sheffield United (loan)	2021–22	Championship	29	1	1	0	0	0	1	0	31	1
Derby County	2022–23	League One	44	7	4	0	3	0	0	0	51	7
Derby County	2023–24	League One	41	5	2	1	1	0	3	0	47	6
Derby County	Total		85	12	6	1	4	0	3	0	98	13
Barnsley	2024–25	League One	2	0	0	0	0	0	0	0	2	0
Career total			504	85	26	3	23	5	29	2	582	95

=== International ===
As of match played 27 September 2022

Appearances and goals by national team and year
National team	Year	Apps	Goals
Republic of Ireland	2017	4	0
Republic of Ireland	2018	4	0
Republic of Ireland	2019	9	1
Republic of Ireland	2020	7	0
Republic of Ireland	2021	8	0
Republic of Ireland	2022	4	0
Total		36	1

Scores and results list the Republic of Ireland's goal tally first, score column indicates score after each Hourihane goal

List of international goals scored by Conor Hourihane
No.	Date	Venue	Opponent	Score	Result	Competition
1	26 March 2019	Aviva Stadium, Dublin, Ireland	Georgia	1–0	1–0	UEFA Euro 2020 qualifying

== Managerial statistics ==
As of match played 2 May 2026

Managerial record by team and tenure
Team	From	To	Record				
Team	From	To	P	W	D	L	Win %
Barnsley	12 March 2025	2 May 2026	66	21	18	27	31.8
Total			66	21	18	27	31.8

== Honours ==
=== As a player ===
Barnsley

- Football League One play-offs: 2016
- Football League Trophy: 2015–16

Aston Villa

- EFL Championship play-offs: 2019
- EFL Cup runner-up: 2019–20

Derby County

- EFL League One second-place promotion: 2023–24

Individual

- Football League One Player of the Month: August 2014
- EFL Championship Player of the Month: September 2016
- EFL League One Team of the Season: 2022–23
- Barnsley Player of the Year: 2014–15

=== As a manager ===
Individual

- EFL League One Manager of the Month: November 2025
