= List of Hull City A.F.C. managers =

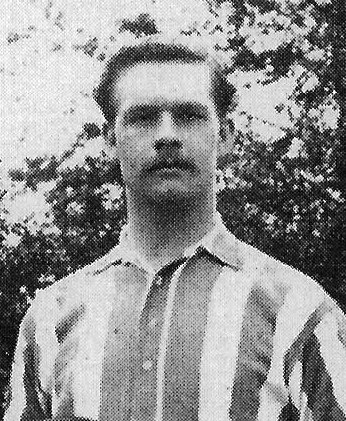
Ambrose Langley was the first Hull City manager in competitive matches, from 1905 to 1913.

Hull City Association Football Club is a professional football club based in Kingston upon Hull in the East Riding of Yorkshire. The club was founded in 1904 and was initially managed by James Ramster who only took charge of the team for friendly matches. Ambrose Langley, a former Sheffield Wednesday player managed Hull for over 300 games from 1905 to 1913. Harry Chapman, Fred Stringer, David Menzies and Percy Lewis held short tenures as manager before Billy McCracken led the club from 1923 to 1931, overseeing 375 matches. Haydn Green took charge for almost three seasons, leaving the club in 1934 with a win percentage just shy of 50%.

Raich Carter became the next Hull City manager to lead the club for over 100 competitive matches, holding the tenure from March 1948 to September 1951. Five managers, Bob Jackson, Bob Brocklebank, Cliff Britton, Terry Neill and John Kaye, then led the club over the next 25 years. Mike Smith and Brian Horton also managed the club for over 100 games, while Terry Dolan took charge for over 300 matches in the 1990s. Dane Jan Mølby became the first manager from outside the United Kingdom when he took over in April 2002. His tenure was to be short-lived, he was replaced on a full-time basis after just 17 competitive matches in charge by Peter Taylor.

Phil Brown became the first Hull City manager to lead the club to the top division of English football in 2008 after winning the Football League Championship play-off Finals 1–0 against Bristol City at Wembley Stadium. After a poor run of results, Brown was placed on "garden leave" to be replaced by Iain Dowie in an attempt to keep Hull City in the Premier League, an effort which ended in relegation with Dowie only overseeing a solitary win in his nine games in charge. Nigel Pearson was appointed to stabilise the team following relegation to the Championship, he held the role for 15 months until he was enticed to return to Leicester City, the club he had left to join Hull City. Hull City player Nick Barmby took over, initially in a caretaker role, in November 2011, but was released from his duties the following May, to be replaced by Steve Bruce. On 22 July 2016 the BBC reported that manager Steve Bruce had resigned from his position. This was later confirmed by the club who announced Mike Phelan would act as caretaker manager. On 13 October 2016, Phelan became the head coach. He was sacked on 3 January 2017. On 5 January 2017, the club announced the appointment of Marco Silva as the new head coach until the end of the 2016–17 season. On 25 May 2017, following relegation from the Premier League head coach Marco Silva resigned. On 9 June 2017, the club announced the appointment of Leonid Slutsky as head coach. On 3 December 2017, Leonid Slutsky left the club by mutual consent after a run of bad results. On 7 December 2017, Nigel Adkins was appointed as head coach on an 18-month contract. On 8 June 2019, manager Atkins indicated that he would not take-up the offer of a new contract with the club and left the club before the start of the 2019–20 season. On 21 June 2019, Grant McCann was appointed as the new head coach on a one-year rolling contract. Following the takeover of the club by Acun Medya Group, backed by Acun Ilıcalı, on 19 January 2022, McCann was sacked a few days later. On 27 January 2022, Shota Arveladze was announced as the new head coach. On 30 September 2022, Arveladze was sacked after a run of four league defeats and Andy Dawson was appointed as interim head coach. Dawson's temporary reign lasted 8 games, 3 wins and 5 losses were recorded before Liam Rosenior was appointed as his successor on 3 November 2022. On 7 May 2024, after a seventh-place finish for Hull City caused the team to narrowly miss out on the play-offs, Rosenior was sacked. Hull City owner, Acun Ilicali said that Rosenior had been sacked over a difference on football philosophy between the two with Ilicali wanting attacking football and Rosenior unable to offer that as a manager. On 31 May 2024, Tim Walter was appointed as the new manager of the club and would take up the post on 1 July 2024. On 27 November 2024, the club parted ways with Walter following a run of four straight defeats and nine games without a win, to be replaced by Andy Dawson as interim head coach. On 6 December 2024, Rubén Sellés was appointed as head coach of the club on a two-and-a-half-year deal, taking up his position from 9 December. On 15 May 2025, the club announced that they had parted company with Sellés. On 11 June 2025, Sergej Jakirović was announced as the new head coach on a two-year contract.

== Managers ==
Updated as of 8 November 2026. Only professional, competitive matches are counted.

Name	Nat	Tenure	G	W	D	L	Win %
James Ramster	England	August 1904 – April 1905	0	0	0	0	00.00
Ambrose Langley	England	April 1905 – April 1913	318	143	67	108	44.96
Harry Chapman	England	April 1913 – September 1914	45	20	10	15	44.44
Fred Stringer	England	September 1914 – July 1916	43	22	6	15	51.16
David Menzies	Scotland	July 1916 – June 1921	90	31	27	32	34.44
Percy Lewis	England	July 1921 – January 1923	71	27	18	26	38.02
Billy McCracken	Northern Ireland	February 1923 – May 1931	375	134	104	137	35.73
Haydn Green	England	May 1931 – March 1934	123	61	24	38	49.59
Jack Hill	England	March 1934 – January 1936	77	24	15	38	31.16
David Menzies	Scotland	February 1936 – October 1936	24	5	8	11	20.83
Ernest Blackburn	England	December 1936 – January 1946	117	50	31	36	42.73
Frank Buckley	England	May 1946 – March 1948	80	33	19	28	41.25
Raich Carter	England	March 1948 – September 1951	157	74	41	42	47.13
Bob Jackson	England	June 1952 – March 1955	123	42	26	55	34.14
Bob Brocklebank	England	March 1955 – May 1961	302	113	71	118	37.41
Cliff Britton	England	July 1961 – November 1969	406	170	101	135	41.87
Terry Neill	Northern Ireland	June 1970 – September 1974	174	61	55	58	35.05
John Kaye	England	September 1974 – October 1977	126	40	40	46	31.74
Bobby Collins	Scotland	October 1977 – February 1978	19	4	7	8	21.05
Wilf McGuinness*	England	February 1978 – April 1978	10	1	4	5	10.00
Ken Houghton	England	April 1978 – December 1979	72	23	22	27	31.94
Mike Smith	England	December 1979 – March 1982	117	30	37	50	25.64
Bobby Brown*	England	March 1982 – June 1982	19	10	4	5	52.63
Colin Appleton	England	June 1982 – May 1984	91	47	29	15	51.64
Brian Horton	England	June 1984 – April 1988	195	77	58	60	39.48
Eddie Gray	Scotland	June 1988 – May 1989	51	13	14	24	25.49
Colin Appleton	England	May 1989 – October 1989	16	1	8	7	6.25
Stan Ternent	England	November 1989 – January 1991	62	19	15	28	30.64
Terry Dolan	England	January 1991 – July 1997	322	99	96	127	30.74
Mark Hateley	England	July 1997 – November 1998	76	17	14	45	22.36
Warren Joyce	England	November 1998 – April 2000	86	33	25	28	38.37
Billy Russell*	Scotland	April 2000 – April 2000	2	0	0	2	00.00
Brian Little	England	April 2000 – February 2002	97	41	28	28	42.26
Billy Russell*	Scotland	February 2002 – April 2002	7	1	1	5	14.29
Jan Mølby	Denmark	April 2002 – October 2002	17	2	8	7	11.76
Billy Russell*	Scotland	October 2002 – October 2002	1	1	0	0	100.00
Peter Taylor	England	October 2002 – June 2006	184	77	50	57	41.84
Phil Parkinson	England	June 2006 – December 2006	24	5	6	13	20.83
Phil Brown	England	December 2006 – June 2010	157	52	40	65	33.12
Iain Dowie†	Northern Ireland	March 2010 – June 2010	9	1	3	5	11.11
Nigel Pearson	England	June 2010 – November 2011	64	23	20	21	35.94
Nick Barmby	England	November 2011 – May 2012	33	13	8	12	39.39
Steve Bruce	England	June 2012 – July 2016	201	83	44	74	41.29
Mike Phelan*	England	July 2016 – October 2016	9	4	1	4	44.44
Mike Phelan‡	England	October 2016 – January 2017	15	2	4	9	13.33
Marco Silva	Portugal	January 2017 – May 2017	22	8	3	11	36.36
Leonid Slutsky	Russia	June 2017 – December 2017	21	4	7	10	19.05
Nigel Adkins	England	December 2017 – June 2019	78	26	21	31	33.33
Grant McCann	Northern Ireland	June 2019 – January 2022	136	53	30	53	38.97
Shota Arveladze	Georgia	January 2022 – September 2022	30	9	6	15	30.00
Andy Dawson*	England	September 2022 – November 2022	8	3	0	5	37.50
Liam Rosenior	England	November 2022 – May 2024	78	27	28	23	34.62
Tim Walter	Germany	July 2024 – November 2024	18	3	6	9	16.67
Andy Dawson*	England	November 2024 – December 2024	2	0	0	2	00.00
Rubén Sellés	Spain	December 2024 – May 2025	28	9	8	11	32.14
Sergej Jakirović	Bosnia and Herzegovina	June 2025 – Present	64	25	19	20	39.1

* Caretaker manager
† Temporary football management consultant
‡ Head coach
