= Listed buildings in Wales, South Yorkshire =

Wales is a civil parish in the Metropolitan Borough of Rotherham, South Yorkshire, England. The parish contains 19 listed buildings that are recorded in the National Heritage List for England. Of these, one is listed at Grade II*, the middle of the three grades, and the others are at Grade II, the lowest grade. The parish contains the villages of Wales and Kiveton Park, and the surrounding area. The listed buildings include houses and associated structures, a church, farmhouses and farm buildings, former mill buildings, two railway bridges, offices, a milepost, and a war memorial.

== Key ==
Grade	Criteria
II*	Particularly important buildings of more than special interest
II	Buildings of national importance and special interest

== Buildings ==
Name and location	Photograph	Date	Notes	Grade
Church of St John the Baptist; 53.33894°N 1.28425°W		Early 12th century	The church was later extended, with a tower added in the 15th century and the vestry in the 18th century. In 1896–97 C. Hodgson Fowler added a new nave and south aisle, and in 1933 there were a new chancel and south vestries. The church is built in sandstone with roofs of Welsh slate and tile. The 12th-century nave and chancel are now the north aisle and chapel. At its west end is the tower in Perpendicular style, with three stages, diagonal buttresses, a three-light west window with a pointed head, string courses, a clock face on the west, two-light bell openings, a north gargoyle, and a parapet. The 12th-century doorway has been re-set in the south porch.	II*
Step Cottage; 53.33867°N 1.28501°W	—	16th century (probable)	A house with a timber framed core, it was encased in the 18th century and later altered. It is in pebbledashed stone with a pantile roof. There are two storeys, two bays, a single-story extension on the left, and a partial rear outshut. On the front is a porch, the ground floor windows are casements, and in the upper floor are horizontally-sliding sash windows.	II
Bedgreave Old Mill; 53.33979°N 1.32064°W		Early 17th century	The former water-powered cornmill is in sandstone with quoins, and has a single storey and a single cell. In the right gable end is a doorway with a two-light mullioned window above, and the other gable has a large opening with a quoined surround. In the right return is a square opening and a slit window.	II
Wales Court; 53.34763°N 1.28240°W	—	1629	A small country house, later extended and divided, it is in sandstone, partly rendered, and has tile roofs. There are two storeys and an irregular plan. At two corners are circular towers surmounted by octagonal copper spires. On the west front is a two-storey square bay window with a hipped roof, and a projecting section with a pediment containing a doorway with a heraldic datestone, and elsewhere are two canted bay windows with copper spires.	II
End sections of outbuildings, Kiveton Hall; 53.34563°N 1.25406°W	—	c. 1700	The end sections of the buildings are in limestone and red brick, with eaves cornices, and hipped roofs of stone slate and pantile. Each section has one storey and one bay. The end walls have a stone plinth and a plinth band, over which is a quoined brick panel containing a twin oeil-de-boeuf with keystones.	II
Section of wall, Kiveton Hall; 53.34503°N 1.25350°W	—	Mid 18th century (probable)	The wall is in limestone with thin slab copings, and is about 3 metres (9.8 ft) high and about 50 metres (160 ft) long. The wall contains a doorway with a quoined architrave and a tripartite keystone, and to its left is a doorway with a plain surround and a dated lintel.	II
Bedgreave New Mill; 53.33989°N 1.32028°W		c. 1768	Originally a corn watermill with an engine house added in the 19th century, and later converted into a visitor centre. It is in sandstone, the gables rebuilt in brick, with quoins and a pantile roof with coped gables and shaped kneelers. There is a T-shaped plan, the mill on the left forming a cross-wing with two storeys and a loft and a gabled front of three bays, to the right is a long single-storey range, and at the rear is a single-storey engine house. In the mill are doorways in the middle bay, and small-pane casement windows, and the range contains a large wagon entrance with a quoined surround.	II
Dovecote behind 4 Manor Road; 53.34184°N 1.28356°W	—	Late 18th century	The dovecote is rectangular with two storeys and a single cell. The lower storey is in stone with quoins, the upper storey is in brick, and there is a hipped pantile roof. In the upper storey is a central round-arched opening with the remains of pigeon holes over a continuous ledge. Inside, there are brick nesting holes.	II
The Beeches; 53.34173°N 1.28359°W	—	Late 18th century	The house is rendered, with quoins, and a Welsh slate roof with coped gables and shaped kneelers. There are two storeys and attics, four bays, and two rear wings infilled by an outshut. In the left bay is an open Doric porch with a pediment, and a doorway with a fanlight. The second and fourth bays contain bay windows, the other windows are sashes, and at the rear is a round-headed stair window.	II
Cartshed and granary, Barn House; 53.34142°N 1.28485°W	—	Early 19th century	The cartshed and granary, later used for other purposes, are in limestone, with red brick on the west side, and a pantile roof with coped gables and shaped kneelers. There are two storeys and five bays. In the ground floor are quoins, and an arcade of five basket arches with rounded brick piers, stone springers, and keystones, and above is a hatch. On the right return are external stone steps.	II
The Farmhouse, Bedgreave Mill; 53.33986°N 1.32001°W		Early 19th century	The farmhouse, later used for other purposes, is in sandstone with quoins and a pantile roof. There are two storeys and an attic, and three bays. The central doorway has a stone slab hood on brackets, and the windows are three-light casements.	II
Kiveton Hall; 53.34518°N 1.25244°W		Early 19th century	The house is built on the site of a previous house, Kiveton Park, which was demolished in 1811. It is in limestone on a plinth, with a floor band and a slate roof. There are two storeys and an attic, fronts of three and two bays, and a rear wing on the left containing the entrance. In the centre is a single-storey canted bay window, and the other windows are a mix of sashes and casements.	II
Ha-ha, Kiveton Hall; 53.34507°N 1.25204°W	—	Early 19th century (probable}	The ha-ha consists of a coped stone wall running in an arc to the east of the house. It is a retaining wall with a ditch on the east side, and the copings are at lawn level.	II
Main gate piers, Kiveton Hall; 53.34516°N 1.25452°W	—	Early 19th century (probable)	The gate piers re-use earlier material, and are in limestone. They are square with chamfered edges, thin bands, pyramidal plinths, and ball finials. Each pier has a buttress containing a panel with an architrave, and a scrolled bracket under a moulded cornice.	II
Railway bridge, Kiveton Bridge Station; 53.34130°N 1.26792°W		c. 1849	The bridge was built by the Manchester, Sheffield and Lincolnshire Railway to carry Station Road (B6059 road) over its line. It is in limestone with a brick soffit, and consists of a single segmental skew arch. The bridge has voussoirs, a band, buttresses, and a coped parapet with iron railings.	II
Railway bridge near Low Laithes Farm; 53.34890°N 1.28123°W	—	c. 1849	The bridge was built by the Manchester, Sheffield and Lincolnshire Railway to carry a track over its line. It is in limestone with a brick soffit, and consists of a single segmental arch. The bridge has voussoirs, a band linking end piers, and a coped parapet.	II
Kiveton Park Colliery Offices; 53.33925°N 1.26486°W		1872–75	The office building is in red brick on a brick plinth, with a moulded sill band and a Welsh slate roof. It is partly in two storeys, partly in one storey with an attic, it has an irregular U-shaped plan, and a main front of nine bays. The building contains a square clock turret with clock faces on a drum under a pyramidal roof with louvred gablets. Other features include an upper floor bay window with a half-pyramidal roof, buttresses, a gable with an oculus, and a war memorial in the form of an Ionic aedicule with a segmental pediment.	II
Milepost; 53.34468°N 1.29895°W		Late 19th century	The milepost is on the east side of Mansfield Road (A618 road), Wales Common. It consists of a gritstone post with cast iron overlay, and has a triangular section and a rounded top. On the top is inscribed "ROTHERHAM & PLEASLEY ROAD" and "WALES" and on the sides are the distances to Rotherham, Mansfield, and Pleasley.	II
War memorial 53.34096°N 1.28394°W		Mid 1920s	The war memorial is in an enclosure by a road junction. It is in white marble, and consists of a statue of an infantryman in battledress standing on a square pedestal on a moulded plinth with a cornice. On the pedestal and plinth are inscriptions and details of those lost in the two World Wars and in later conflicts.	II
