= Kiveton Park Colliery Cricket Club =

Coordinates: 53.33990°N 1.2610°W

Personnel
- Captain: (England) James Leach

Team information
- Founded: 1879
- Home ground: Stone Close

Kiveton Park Colliery Cricket Club is an English cricket club based in Kiveton Park, South Yorkshire.The 1st XI currently play in the Bassetlaw Championship in 2025 with the 2nd XI competing in Division 2.

== History ==
The club has been a member of the Bassetlaw and District Cricket League since its inception in 1904. The first team did compete in an ECB Premier League competition (the Nottinghamshire Premier League) for the 2011 season after winning the Bassetlaw League a year earlier, but were relegated back after just one year.

=== Notable players ===
- Harry Chapman
- Bert Morley
- Mike Smedley
- Ari Karvelas
