= Todwick =

Village in South Yorkshire, England

Coordinates: 53.35°N 1.26°W

- Village
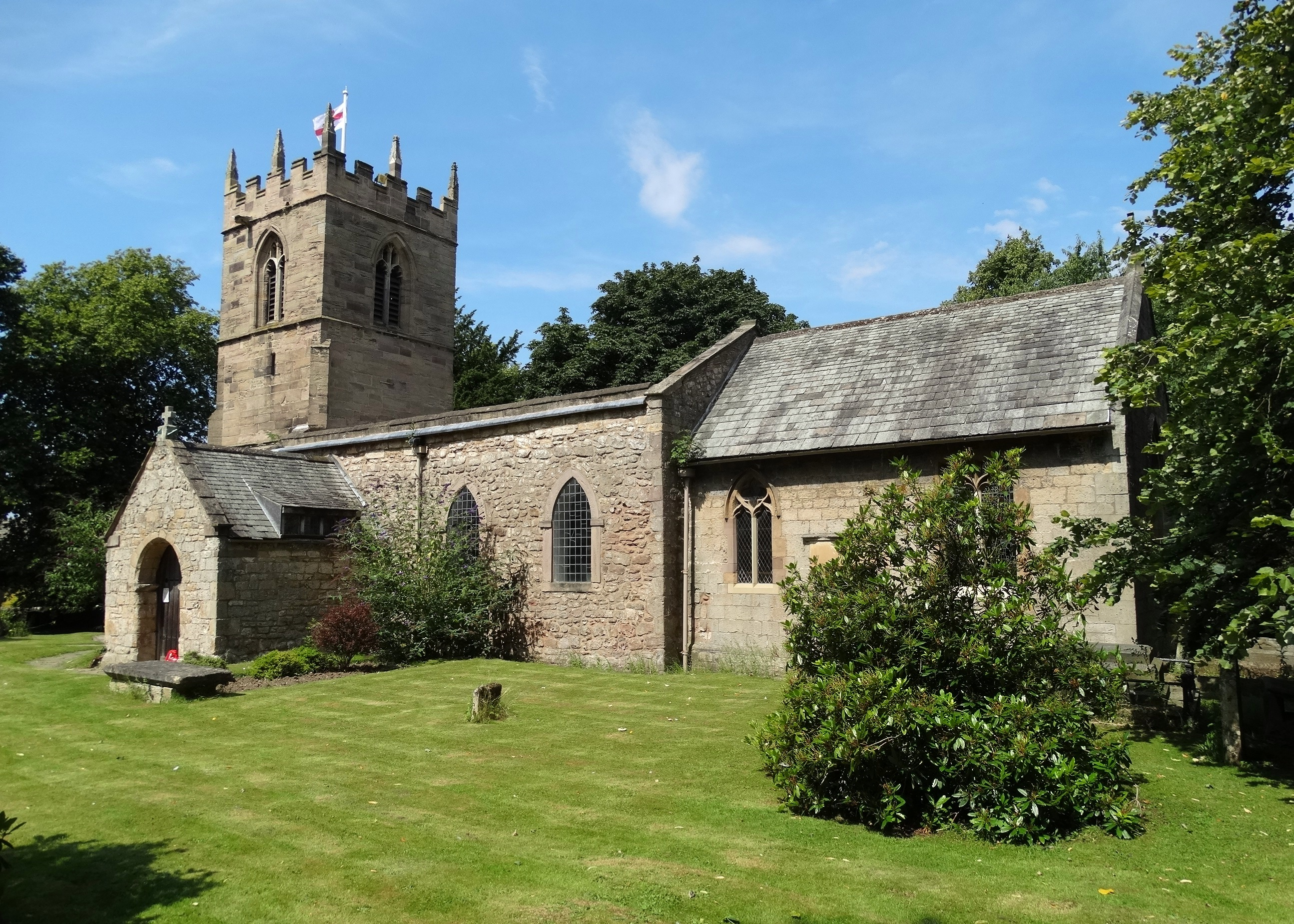
- St Peter & St Paul's Church

- Location within South Yorkshire
- Population: 1,634 (2011)
- OS grid reference: SK492842
- Civil parish: Todwick
- Metropolitan borough: Rotherham
- Metropolitan county: South Yorkshire
- Region: Yorkshire and the Humber
- Country: England
- Sovereign state: United Kingdom
- Post town: SHEFFIELD
- Postcode district: S26
- Dialling code: 01909
- Police: South Yorkshire
- Fire: South Yorkshire
- Ambulance: Yorkshire
- UK Parliament: Rother Valley

Todwick is a village in the Metropolitan Borough of Rotherham in South Yorkshire, England. It has a population of 1,637, reducing marginally to 1,634 at the 2011 Census, and contains a primary school (junior and infants). There is a village hall adjacent to the primary school, and this is on the corner of Kiveton Lane and The Pastures.

The main street in Todwick is Kiveton Lane, which runs through the heart of the village, connecting it at one end to the A57, towards Dinnington, Anston, Thurcroft etc., and at the other end to Station Road in Kiveton Park. At the Kiveton Park end of Kiveton Lane there is a small marker, which was reputed to be the site of a look out post for Robin Hood. A plaque marks the spot behind a white gate just outside the village. Todwick can only be accessed by road or footpath; the nearest railway stations are Kiveton Bridge and Kiveton Park on the Sheffield to Lincoln line. Its location near to the M1 motorway gives the village's inhabitants good access to the country. Local towns provide many job opportunities for Todwick's working population.

Todwick has two parks; the smallest is alongside the church graveyard on Lindleys Croft, and has had in previous years, swings, a roundabout, climbing frame and a basketball court. The other park is known as "the rec" to locals. It has two football fields on it, as well as slides and roundabouts at the village end, and a bowling green and cricket field at the far end. The village's annual bonfire on Guy Fawkes Night is held here, where many locals gather for hot dogs, toffee apples, sparklers and fireworks, although this has not been organised for the past few years due to health and safety hazards. Todwick Junior and Infant School was rated as satisfactory in an Ofsted report during 2010.

In the 1960s, plans were made for an airport at Todwick to serve Sheffield and Rotherham. However, the plans were not realised, and Sheffield did not get its own airport until the 1990s, which itself closed fully in 2008.

The name Todwick derives from the Old English Tatawīc meaning 'Tata's trading settlement'.

== See also ==
- Listed buildings in Todwick
