= Fred Stringer =

English football manager (born 1875)

Personal information
- Full name: Fred Stringer
- Date of birth: 28 July 1875
- Place of birth: Sheffield, England
- Date of death: 17 January 1940 (aged 64)
- Place of death: Kingston upon Hull, England

Managerial career
- Years: Team
- 1914–1916: Hull City

Fred Stringer (28 July 1875 – 17 January 1940) was an English association football manager who is best remembered as manager of Hull City between September 1914 and July 1916.

Stringer was the club's fourth-ever manager, succeeding Harry Chapman and being replaced by David Menzies. He had a win percentage of 51.16% from 43 competitive games: 22 wins, 6 draws and 15 losses. This is the best combined percentage of any Hull City manager.
