= Ramster (surname) =

Ramster is a surname. Notable people with the surname include:

- John Ramster (c. 1861–1915), English businessman and sports enthusiast
- P.J. Ramster (died 1941), Australian film director
