= Paul Cross (footballer) =

English footballer

Personal information
- Full name: Paul Cross
- Date of birth: 31 October 1965 (age 60)
- Place of birth: Barnsley, England
- Height: 5 ft 7 in (1.70 m)
- Position: Defender

Senior career*
Years	Team	Apps	(Gls)
1982–1991	Barnsley	119	(0)
1991	→ Preston North End (loan)	5	(0)
1991–1993	Hartlepool United	74	(1)
1993–1995	Darlington	39	(2)
- Guisborough Town
Total		237	(3)
- * Club domestic league appearances and goals

Paul Cross (born 31 October 1965) is an English former footballer who made 237 appearances in the Football League playing for Barnsley, Preston North End, Hartlepool United and Darlington.

Cross was a left back for Barnsley from 1983 to 1991. He progressed through the ranks of the youth side, finally achieving first team status under the management of local lad head-hunter, Allan Clarke. The defender owes much of his recognition to Eric Winstanley, a huge influence and early mentor of Cross.

Cross was plagued with injury early in his career but persevered at Barnsley until 1991 before moving to Hartlepool United when the chairmanship was under financial scrutiny. Cross was joint-manager of Northern League club Crook Town between September 1997 and October 1998 alongside former Darlington teammate Kevan Smith.

Cross has been a frequent radio commentator on Northern Derby matches between Darlington and Hartlepool, both teams he has played for.

== Honours ==
Individual

- Barnsley Player of the Year: 1987–88
