= Eric Oakton =

English footballer

Personal information
- Full name: Albert Eric Okaton
- Date of birth: 28 December 1906
- Place of birth: Kiveton Park, England
- Date of death: August 1981 (aged 74)
- Height: 5 ft 9 in (1.75 m)
- Position: Outside right

Senior career*
Years	Team	Apps	(Gls)
- Kiveton Park
1932–1937	Chelsea	107	(29)
- * Club domestic league appearances and goals

Eric Oakton (28 December 1906 – August 1981) was an English footballer who played for Chelsea and Grimsby Town.
