= Julie Anne Quay =

Australian businesswoman

Julie Anne Quay is an Australian businesswoman, who is the minority of owner of Barnsley F.C., and founder of fashion platform VFiles.

== Career ==
In 2017, she became minority owner of English football club Barnsley.

== See also ==
- List of owners of English football clubs
