= Wales, South Yorkshire =

Village and a civil parish in South Yorkshire, England

Wales
- Village and civil parish
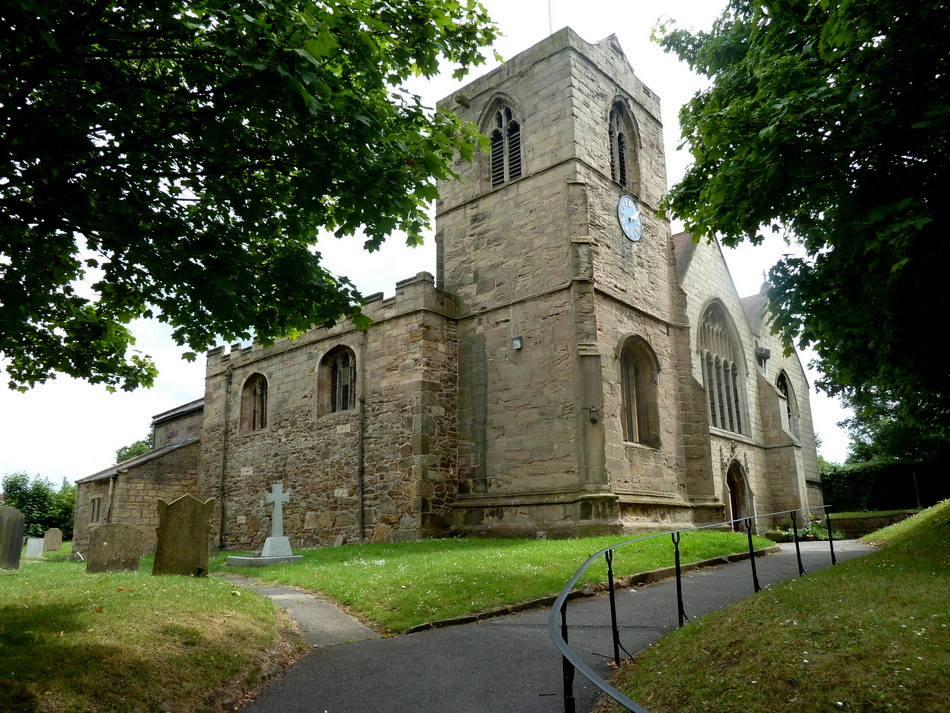
- St John the Baptist Church

- Location within South Yorkshire
- Area: 10.29 km^{2} (3.97 sq mi)
- Population: 1,260 (2011 census) Civil parish: 7,069
  - Density: 122/km^{2} (320/sq mi)
- OS grid reference: SK480829
- Civil parish: Wales
- Metropolitan borough: Rotherham
- Metropolitan county: South Yorkshire
- Region: Yorkshire and the Humber
- Country: England
- Sovereign state: United Kingdom
- Post town: SHEFFIELD
- Postcode district: S26
- Dialling code: 01909
- Police: South Yorkshire
- Fire: South Yorkshire
- Ambulance: Yorkshire
- UK Parliament: Rother Valley
- Website: https://www.walesparishcouncil.gov.uk/

Wales is a village and a civil parish in the Metropolitan Borough of Rotherham in South Yorkshire, England. Historically part of the West Riding of Yorkshire, it borders to the south Derbyshire and is astride the M1 motorway. The civil parish of Wales, which has a population of 6,455, increasing to 7,069 at the 2011 Census, encompasses the village and neighbouring settlement Kiveton Park.

== Etymology ==
The village shares its name with the country of Wales, and it is likely that the two placenames share a derivation (see: Etymology of Wales). As such, the village name derives from the Germanic word *Walhaz, a term used by Germanic people across Europe to refer to the Romanised inhabitants of the former Empire. It is suggested therefore, that the name records the continuation of a "British" population in this area, which survived the arrival of the Anglo-Saxons, and remained distinctively Romano-British in language and culture. An alternative explanation suggests that the settlement's name may be derived from the word Waelas, meaning "field of battle".

== History ==
The first written reference to the village is as Walesho when the Northumbrian thegn, Wulfric Spot is recorded as possessing it in 1002. By the time of the Domesday Book, the village is recorded as Walise. Sir William Hewet, Lord Mayor of London in 1559, was born in Wales, and his descendants, the Dukes of Leeds, would come to dominate the area. The collieries at Waleswood and Kiveton Park historically provided employment in the area, including to migrants from Wales' namesake country, until Kiveton Park Colliery was closed in September 1994.

=== Waleswood ===
Waleswood is a small hamlet located to the north-west of Wales. Historically the hamlet was known for Waleswood Hall, and later Waleswood Colliery, which also featured a railway station. Much of the former colliery site is now occupied by the Gulliver's Valley theme park.

=== Wales Bar ===
Wales Bar is another hamlet, located to the west of Wales. The village contains typical 20th century miners' housing, many of the former occupants working in the surrounding collieries at Waleswood and Brookhouse.

== Geography ==
The village of Wales itself is located at approximately 53°20′30″N 1°16′45″W, at an elevation of around 300 feet (100 m) above sea level. It lies on the A618 and B6059 roads. The M1 motorway bisects the parish, while the southern boundary is partly marked by the Chesterfield Canal whose Norwood Tunnel runs under meadowland to the south. To the west of the village is Rother Valley Country Park.

== Education and employment ==
Education in Wales is provided by Wales Primary School and Wales High School. The industrial estate at Wales Common continues to be a large source of employment (not least the food manufacturer Greencore Prepared Foods) & LuK, part of the multi-national manufacturing group producing clutch & automotive parts.

== See also ==
- Listed buildings in Wales, South Yorkshire
