= Listed buildings in Todwick =

Todwick is a civil parish in the Metropolitan Borough of Rotherham, South Yorkshire, England. The parish contains ten listed buildings that are recorded in the National Heritage List for England. Of these, one is listed at Grade II*, the middle of the three grades, and the others are at Grade II, the lowest grade. The parish contains the village of Todwick and the surrounding countryside. Most of the listed buildings are houses, cottages, farmhouses and farm buildings, and the others consist of a church, a hand pump, and a milepost.

== Key ==
| Grade | Criteria |
|---|---|
| II* | Particularly important buildings of more than special interest |
| II | Buildings of national importance and special interest |

== Buildings ==
| Name and location | Photograph | Date | Notes | Grade |
|---|---|---|---|---|
| Church of St Peter and St Paul; 53.35172°N 1.25409°W | | 11th century | The church has been altered and extended through the centuries, the chancel dating from the 14th century, and the tower from the 15th century . The church is built in sandstone and limestone, and has roofs of lead and slate. It consists of a nave with a south porch, a chancel, and a west tower. The tower is in Perpendicular style, with three stages, diagonal buttresses, a three-light west window, string courses, slit windows, two-light bell openings, and an embattled parapet with eight crocketed pinnacles. The north doorway, which dates from the 11th century, has a round arch and is blocked. The porch is gabled and has a sundial in the apex; it has a round-arched entrance and the inner door is Norman, also with a round arch. | II* |
| Nickerwood Farmhouse; 53.35236°N 1.29265°W | — | 16th century (probable) | The farmhouse has a timber framed core, and was encased and extended in the 18th century. It is rendered on stone and brick, and has a pantile roof. There are two storeys, three bays, and a continuous rear outshut. The windows are 20th-century casements. There is remaining timber framing internally. | II |
| Todwick Old Hall; 53.35825°N 1.25740°W | — | 17th century | The farmhouse is in sandstone with quoins and a pantile roof. There are two storeys, attics and cellars, and three bays. The doorway at the rear has a chamfered and quoined surround, some mullioned windows with hood moulds remain, and most of the other windows are 20th-century casements. | II |
| Outbuilding northwest of Todwick Old Hall; 53.35842°N 1.25733°W | — | Late 17th century | The farm building is in sandstone with quoins and a pantile roof. There are two storeys and two bays. It contains various openings, some of which are blocked, including a three-light window without its mullions. On the left return are external stone steps to an upper floor doorway. | II |
| 44 and 46 Kiveton Lane; 53.35592°N 1.25738°W | — | Early 18th century | A farmhouse, later extended and divided, it is in sandstone, partly roughcast, with quoins, a floor band, and pantile roofs. There are two storeys and an attic, a front of three bays, a single-storey extension on the left, and a rear wing. The doorway has a cornice on consoles, the windows on the front are sashes with keystones, and in the rear wing are mullioned windows. | II |
| Former cottages behind 34 Kiveton Lane; 53.35723°N 1.25740°W | — | Early 19th century | The cottages, later used for other purposes, are in sandstone with a pantile roof. There are two storeys, and each cottage has a single bay. The windows are casements with iron frames; they and the doorways have plain lintels. | II |
| Farm building, Nickerwood Farm; 53.35238°N 1.29186°W | | Early 19th century (probable) | A combination farm building in red sandstone on a plinth, with quoins, a floor band, and a hipped pantile roof. There are two storeys and six bays. The openings include a large entrance and doorways, some with quoined surrounds, windows, slit vents, and circular pitching holes. | II |
| Hand pump behind 44 Kiveton Lane; 53.35603°N 1.25727°W | — | Mid 19th century | The hand pump is in cast iron, and has a cylindrical shaft with a bolted flange at the base and three annulets. The fluted barrel has a decorative spout and a cranked handle on the left, and a fluted cap with a finial. | II |
| Hardwick Grange Farmhouse; 53.37153°N 1.27196°W | — | Mid 19th century | The farmhouse is in red sandstone on a plinth, with chamfered quoins, an eaves band, and a hipped tile roof. There are two storeys, fronts of three and two bays, and a lower wing at the rear on the right. The middle bay is recessed and flanked by quoins, and contains a doorway with an architrave and a fanlight, above which is a round-headed French window in an architrave with a pierced balustrade. The doorway is flanked by bay windows with a swept roof, and in the upper floor are sash windows in architraves and with moulded sills. | II |
| Milepost; 53.36221°N 1.26443°W | | Late 19th century | The milepost is on the north side of the A57 road near the entrance to Todwick Grange. It consists of a round-headed sandstone pillar, originally with a cast iron plaque that indicated the distances to Sheffield and Worksop. | II |
