= Kiveton Hall =

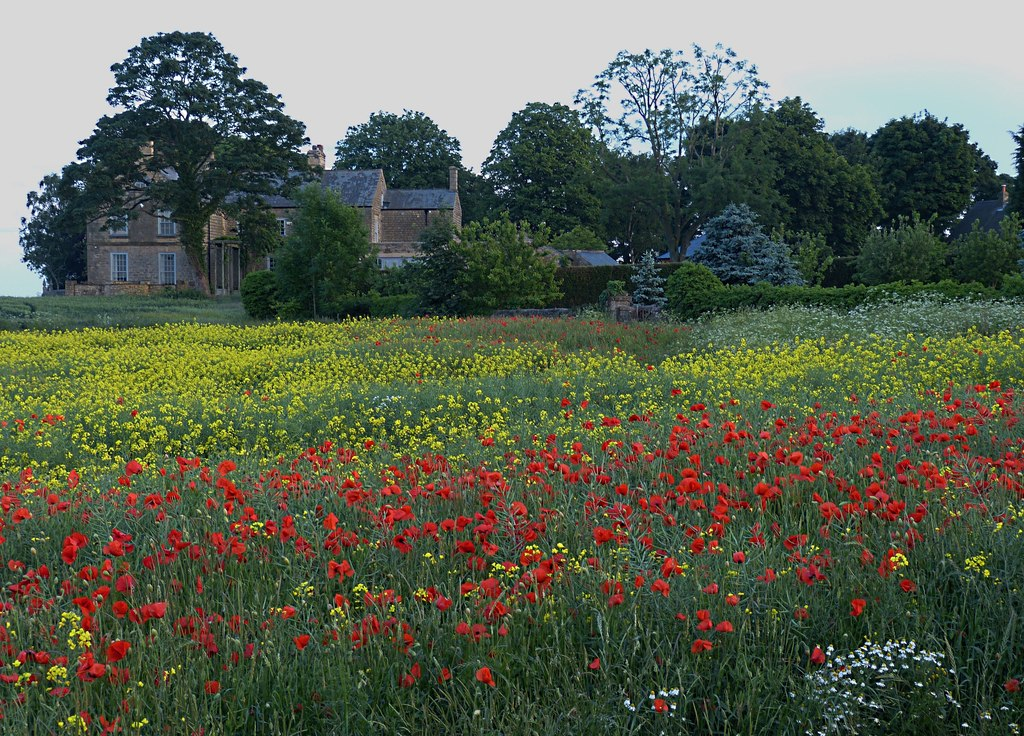

- Location within South Yorkshire
- 53.34518°N 1.25244°W
- Location: Kiveton Park, Wales, Metropolitan Borough of Rotherham, South Yorkshire

History
- Built: Early 19th century

Listed Building – Grade II
- Official name: Kiveton Hall
- Designated: 8 April 1986

Listed Building – Grade II
- Official name: Ha-ha Immediately to East of Kiveton Hall
- Designated: 8 April 1986

Listed Building – Grade II
- Official name: Main Gate Piers to Kiveton Hall
- Designated: 8 April 1986

Listed Building – Grade II
- Official name: End Sections of 2 Outbuildings at Kiveton Hall Farm Each Having Twin Oeil-De-Boeuf and Facing Kiveton Lane
- Designated: 8 April 1986

Listed Building – Grade II
- Official name: Section of Wall Flanking South Side of Drive to Kiveton Hall and Forming North Side of Walled Garden to South West of House
- Designated: 8 April 1986

Kiveton Hall is a Grade II listed house in Kiveton Park, Wales, near Rotherham, South Yorkshire, England.

== History ==
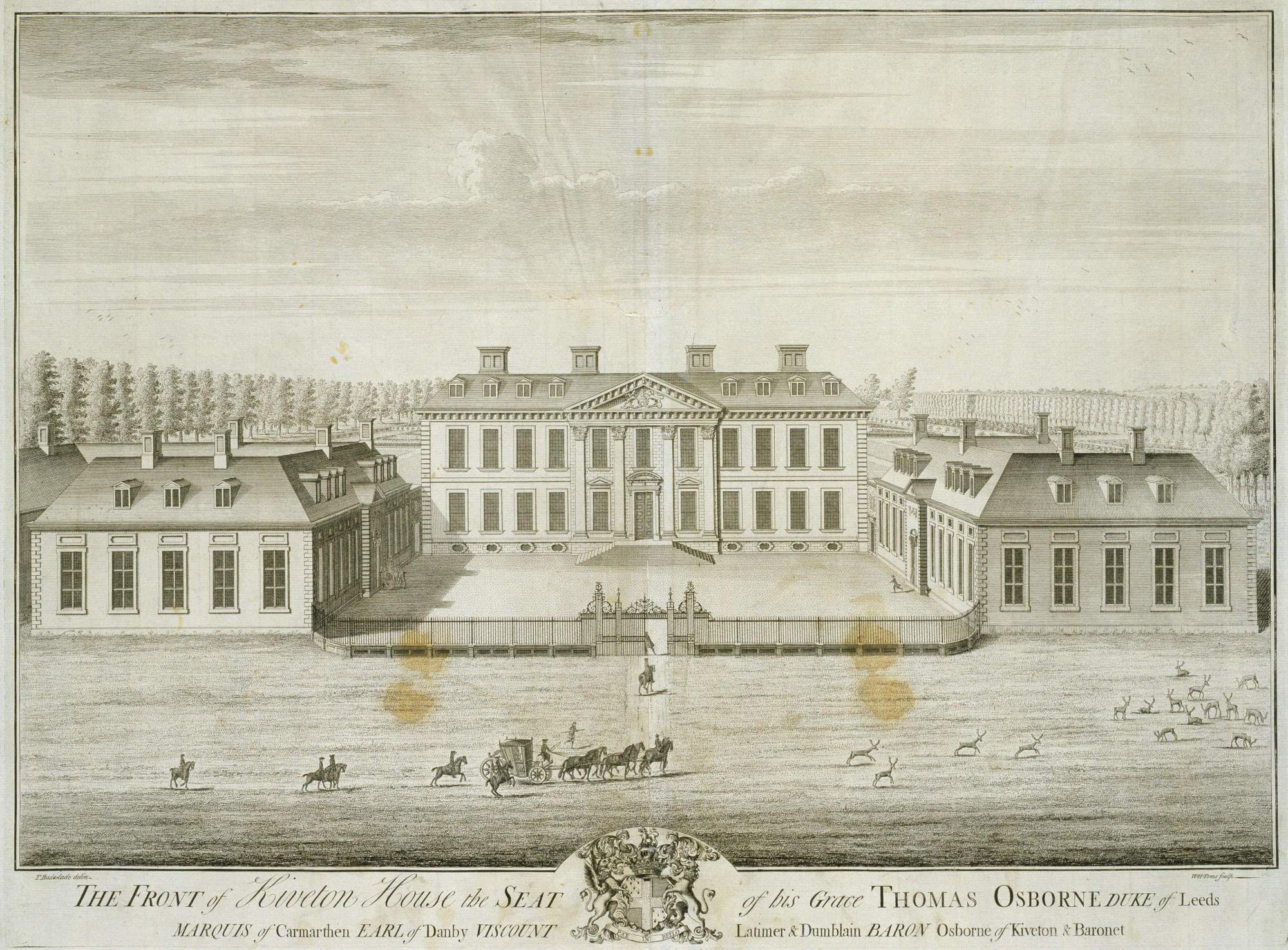
Kiveton Hall

The house was built on the side of a previous house, also named Kiveton Park, that was built between 1698 and 1704 for Thomas Osborne, 1st Duke of Leeds, and demolished in 1811. The current house was built later, in the early part of the 19th century.

== Architecture ==
The house is built in limestone on a plinth, and it has a floor band and a slate roof. There are two storeys and an attic, fronts of three and two bays, and a rear wing on the left containing the entrance. In the centre is a single-storey canted bay window, and the other windows are a mix of sashes and casements.

== Associated buildings ==
Associated with the house are four buildings listed at Grade II. These are the ha-ha to the east of the house, the main gate piers, the end sections of two outbuildings at Kiveton Hall Farm, and the section of the wall flanking the south side of the drive to Kiveton Hall.
