= Barry Murphy (footballer, born 1940) =

English footballer (1940–2026)

Personal information
- Full name: Laurence Barry Murphy
- Date of birth: 10 February 1940
- Place of birth: Consett, England
- Date of death: October 2026 (aged 86)
- Position: Right-back

Senior career*
Years	Team	Apps	(Gls)
–1962	South Shields		
1962–1978	Barnsley	569	(3)
- * Club domestic league appearances and goals

Laurence Barry Murphy (10 February 1940 – October 2026) was an English footballer who played as a right-back in the Football League for Barnsley and was their record appearance holder with 569.

== Career ==
Murphy joined Barnsley from South Shields in 1962. He made his debut in the same year against Halifax, losing 2–0.

"Spud" was the first Barnsley player to be used as a substitute in October 1965 when he replaced Brian Jackson in a 5–1 defeat at Doncaster Rovers.

After earning his first-team status, Murphy went on to make a consecutive run of 165 league and 17 cup games. He was voted Barnsley's player of the year in 1972, and after the emergence of two other young full-backs he took on a central defensive role in 1974–75 under Jim Iley when he was also made captain.

In November 1975 he was appointed player-coach aged 35 years and was restored to his former right-back role and was an ever-present during the 1976–77 season. He made his final appearance aged 38 years in April 1978 against Torquay Utd.

He continued on the Reds' coaching staff under Allan Clarke and joined him at Leeds United in October 1980.

Murphy coached at Leeds United until 1984.

== Retirement and death ==
After his retirement, Murphy became a regular special guest at Barnsley and was often the host for their many charitable events.

Murphy's death was announced on 24 October 2026. He was 86.

== Honours ==
- Barnsley Hall of Fame
