= Kiveton Park =

Village in South Yorkshire, England

- Village
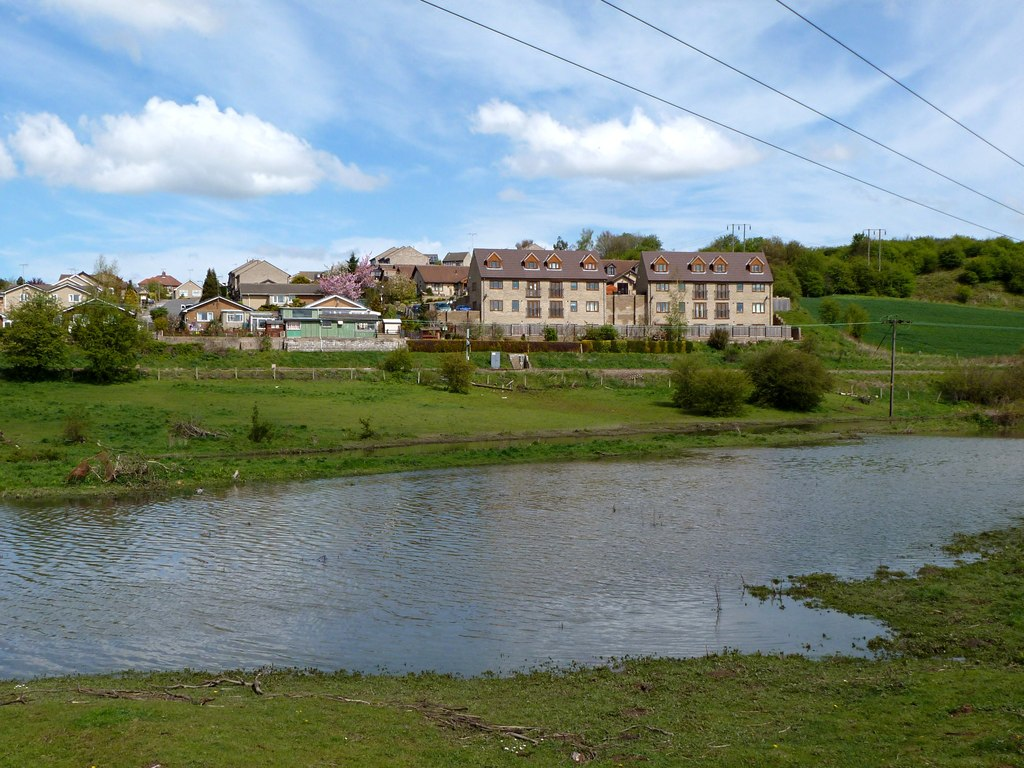

- Location within South Yorkshire
- OS grid reference: SK4983
  - London: 135 mi (217 km) SSE
- Civil parish: Wales
- Metropolitan borough: Rotherham
- Metropolitan county: South Yorkshire
- Region: Yorkshire and the Humber
- Country: England
- Sovereign state: United Kingdom
- Post town: SHEFFIELD
- Postcode district: S26
- Dialling code: 01909
- Police: South Yorkshire
- Fire: South Yorkshire
- Ambulance: Yorkshire
- UK Parliament: Rother Valley

Kiveton Park /ˈkɪvɪtən/ is a village within the Metropolitan Borough of Rotherham, in South Yorkshire, England. Historically a part of the West Riding of Yorkshire, from the Norman conquest to 1868, Kiveton was a hamlet of the parish of Harthill-with-Woodall. It subsequently transferred to the civil parish of Wales which takes its name from the neighbouring village.

== Geography ==
Kiveton Park is located at approximately 53°20′30″N 1°15′30″W, at an elevation of around 330 feet (100 m) above sea level, and is located 8 miles (13 km) west of Worksop, and 11 miles (18 km) south-east of both Sheffield, and Rotherham respectively. It lies on the B6059 road (Station Road) and is served by two railway stations: Kiveton Bridge and Kiveton Park. The Chesterfield Canal lies to the south, while the villages of Todwick and South Anston are to the north and east. Kiveton Park lays claim to being in Rotherham Borough Council, has a Sheffield postcode, a Worksop telephone code, and has the Chesterfield Canal running through it. The village has two railway stations: Kiveton Bridge railway station in the centre of the village; and Kiveton Park railway station.

== History ==
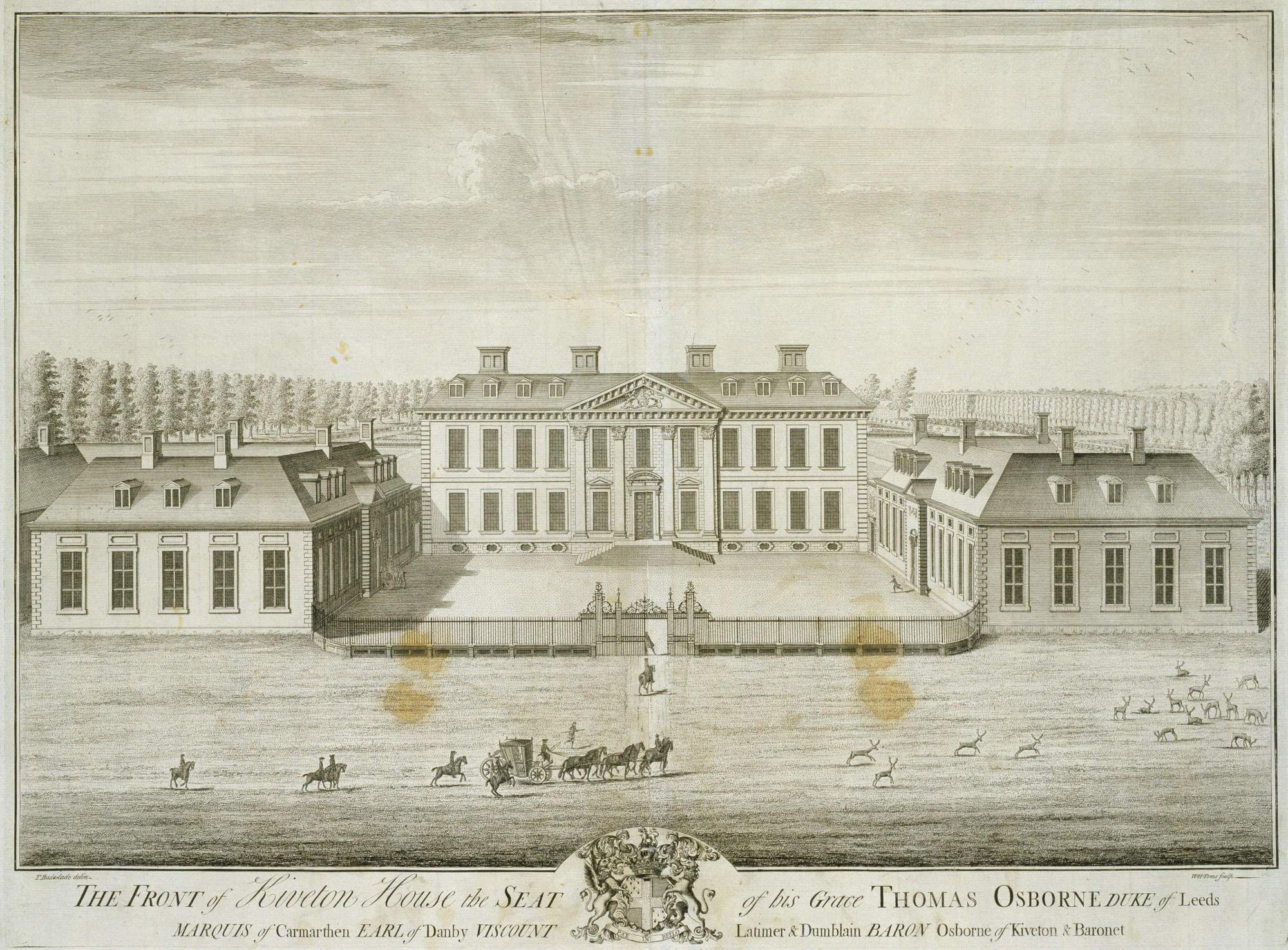
Kiveton Hall

Kiveton gets its name from the Anglo-Saxon for the settlement in the hollow. In the Domesday Book it is written "Ciuetone", and was under the ownership of William de Warenne.

It subsequently transferred to the de Keuton family, who sold the estate to the heirs of the former Lord Mayor of London Sir William Hewett (of the neighbouring hamlet of Wales, died 1567) in 1580. One of his descendants was Thomas Osborne who became the first Duke of Leeds. He arranged the building of a stately home in the village, Kiveton Hall (also spelled Keveton, Keeton or Keton Hall), in 1698.

The building was demolished by George William Frederick Osborne, 6th Duke of Leeds in 1812, with local legend stating that the demolition was the result of a bet with the then Prince of Wales (subsequently George IV of the United Kingdom). After Kiveton Hall was demolished, Hornby Castle became the main seat of the Dukes of Leeds. The traditional burial place of the Dukes of Leeds was All Hallows Church, Harthill.

A Community History Project has been set up to record and encourage an understanding of the history of Kiveton Park and neighbouring Wales, particularly mining heritage. This was based in the Old Colliery Offices.

== Economy ==
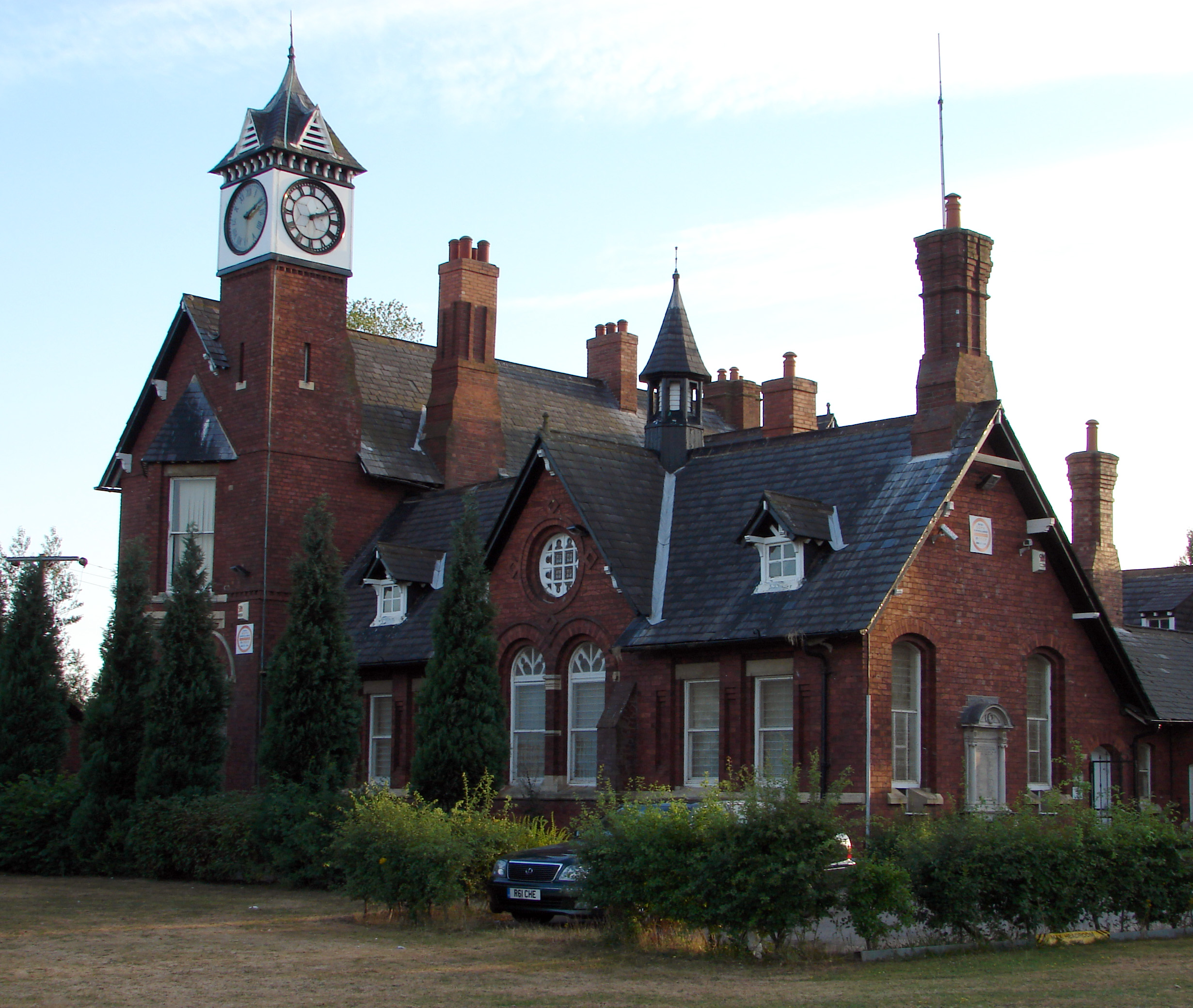
The old colliery offices, Kiveton

Coal mining has traditionally been the principal industry of Kiveton, and dates back to the Middle Ages. Much of the coal is near to the surface, and as early as 1598, the area was extracting 2,000 tons a year.

By the middle of the 19th century, the coal-fields were being served both by canal and by rail, and in 1866, the Kiveton Park Colliery was sunk, making it one of the earliest deep mines in the world. As a result of the new colliery, the population of Kiveton increased from 300 to 1,400 over a period of ten years. The pit closed in 1994, resulting in the loss of 1,000 jobs. As a consequence, Kiveton is now essentially a commuter base for adjacent towns.

Kiveton contains a steelworks at the bottom of Redhill, which was damaged by fire on 27 August 2009.

All of the colliery buildings have since been demolished, including the originally protected pit-head baths (built in 1938), with the exception of the 1870s office building with its gothic clock tower, which still remains. The Kiveton Park and Wales Community Development Trust uses the office building as a base. The trust's aims are to provide services and increase development within the community sector.

== Sport ==
Kiveton's sporting history extends back to 1879, when Kiveton Park Colliery Cricket Club was formed. The club has been a member of the Bassetlaw and District Cricket League since its inception in 1904. The first team did compete in an ECB Premier League competition (the Nottinghamshire Premier League) for the 2011 season after winning the Bassetlaw League a year earlier, but were relegated back after one year.

In 1881, Kiveton Park Football Club was formed. The club has played in the FA Cup and FA Vase on numerous occasions. They currently play in the Sheffield County Senior League, having previously been members of the Yorkshire League, Northern Counties East League and the Central Midlands League.

The village is the birthplace of football manager Herbert Chapman, and his brother Harry, a Sheffield Wednesday player. At one time the village football club was reputed to have produced more professional footballers than any place its size in England, with the Chapman brothers, Derek Ashton (Aston Villa), Bert Morley (Notts County and England), Sidney Cartwright (Arsenal), Leslie Hoften (Manchester United), Eric Oakton (Chelsea) and Walter Wigmore (Birmingham City) all coming from the village.

Patrick Barclay, in his book about Herbert Chapman, wrote: "Kiveton Park could claim to have been a cradle of two revolutions, one industrial and the other sporting, and beyond question it is the birthplace of at least one great man, widely considered the father of football as we have come to know it. "

Motorcycle rider James Toseland grew up in Kiveton Park. He was a two times World Superbike Champion in 2004 and 2007.

== Radio ==
Following broadcasts since 2000, on Saturday 27 March 2010 Kiveton gained its own community radio station on a 5-year licence under Redroad FM on 102.4 FM. This licence was extended again by OFCOM in 2015 to 2020.

== Notable people ==
- Harry Chapman - Sheffield Wednesday football player
- Herbert Chapman - Arsenal Manager
- Leslie Hofton - Manchester United football player
- Bert Morley - Notts County, Grimsby Town and England football player
- Eric Oakton - Chelsea football player
- Ryan Sampson - Plebs actor Doctor Who
- Walter Wigmore - Birmingham City football player
- James Toseland - World Superbike Championship motorcycle rider
- Jonny Yerrell - singer (The Reytons)

== See also ==
- Listed buildings in Wales, South Yorkshire
