= Tiverton Preedy =

English clergyman, football club founder

- Preedy (left) pictured boxing in 1908
- Born: 22 January 1863; Hunstanton, Norfolk, England
- Died: 26 April 1928 (aged 65); London, England
- Occupation: Clergyman

Tiverton Preedy (22 January 1863 – 26 April 1928) was an English clergyman who worked in Yorkshire and London from 1887 until his death, where he was noted for his work with the poor. He was particularly interested in the use of sport within ministry, and founded a church football team in Barnsley which became the modern Barnsley Football Club.

In 1893 he moved to London to become curate of a church in Islington, and later opened a nearby mission. He opened a boxing club at the mission and organised dances for local flower sellers. In recognition of his work, he was appointed a prebendary of St. Pauls Cathedral in 1926. He died two years later and is buried in Islington Cemetery. In the 1990s supporters of Barnsley F.C. located and restored his grave. The grave is still maintained by supporters of Barnsley F.C. who travel down each summer.

== Early life ==
Preedy was born in Hunstanton in the county of Norfolk in 1863, the second son of a local estate agent. He attended Bloxham School near Sleaford, Lincolnshire before entering Lincoln Theological College in 1885, where he trained to become a minister in the Church of England. In 1887 he was ordained as a deacon, and in the same year was appointed to the position of Assistant Stipendiary Curate at St Peter's church in the centre of Barnsley. The church had originally been set up as a mission to tend to the people of the poverty-stricken area, but was licensed as a parish in its own right in 1887. Preedy was engaged to assist the vicar, John Lloyd Brereton.

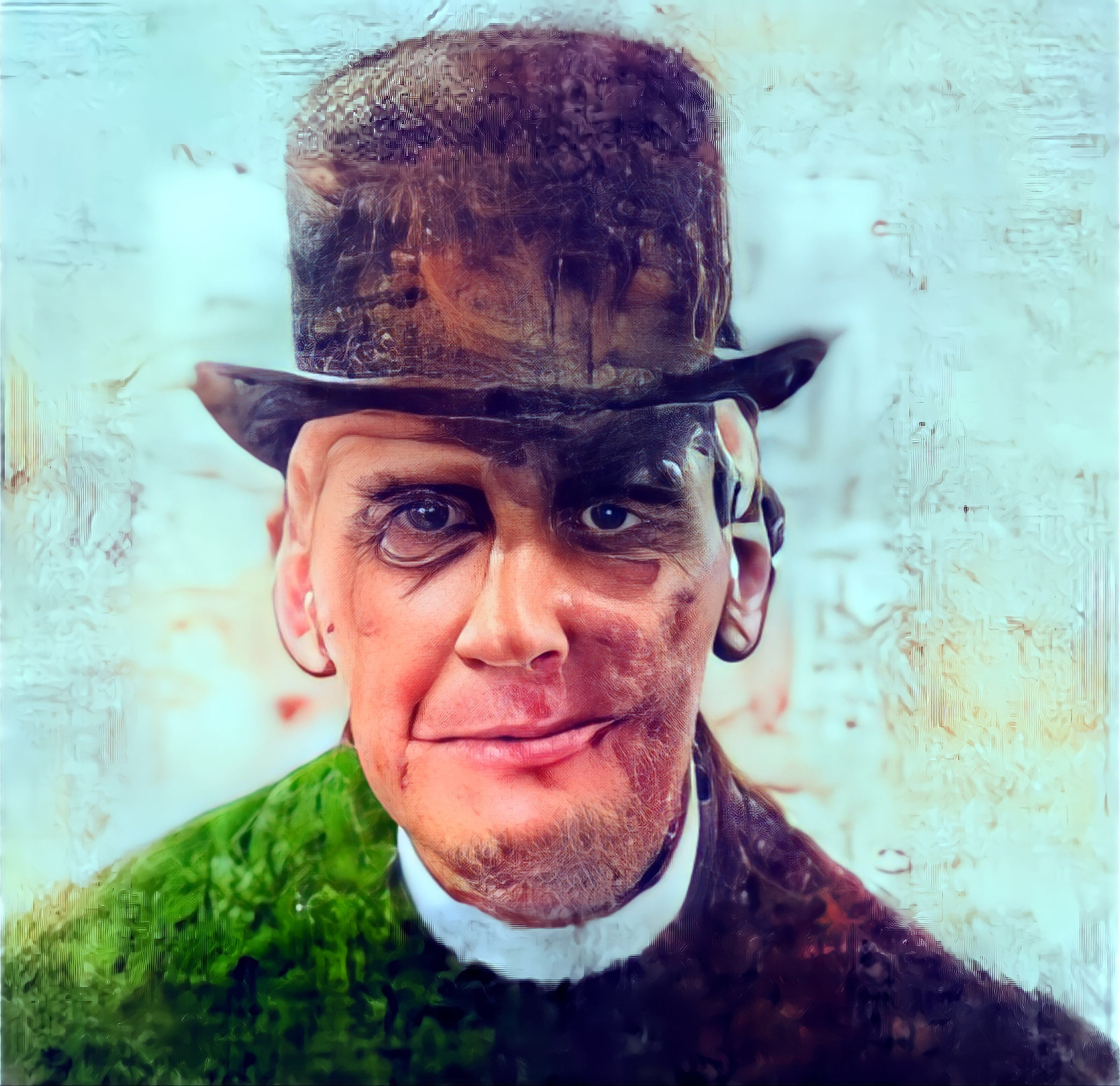

During his time at Theological College, Preedy had become keen on the concept of using sport to engender moral values, an idea much in vogue at the time and known as muscular Christianity. To this end, he decided to join a local sporting club, through which he hoped to come into closer contact with the local people. He initially joined a rugby football club, but resigned in protest at the team's decision to play a match on Good Friday.

== Formation of Barnsley Football Club ==
Shortly after his split from the rugby club, Preedy encountered by chance a group of young men discussing the idea of forming an association football club. Preedy was taken with the idea, not least because football was seen in the area as the "poor man's sport" and his involvement would therefore bring him into greater contact with the poor people he wished to help through his ministry. To this end he formed a football club in September 1887. Preedy acted as principal fundraiser and organiser of the club, dubbed Barnsley St Peter's F.C., and even played in its first match. A keen supporter of the Temperance movement, Preedy demanded high standards of behaviour from his players, and once refused to allow St Peter's to play a match against local rivals Ardsley Old due to the conduct of the latter's supporters.

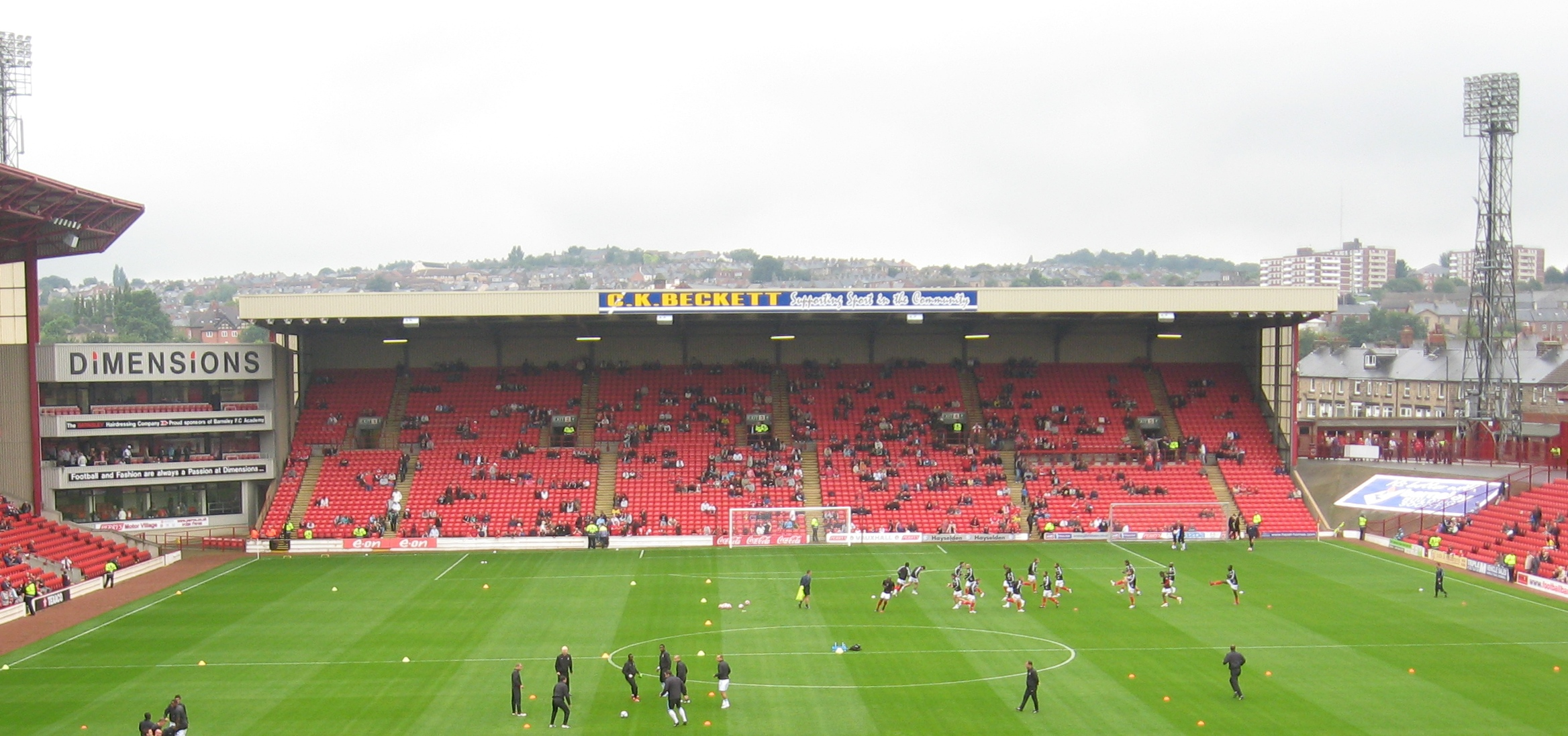
A modern view of the Oakwell stadium. Preedy secured for the club the use of the land on which the stadium still stands.

Preedy was also responsible for securing the use of the land on which the Oakwell stadium still stands. After being refused permission to hire a field belonging to the owners of the Barnsley Brewery, Preedy's appeal to the wife of one of the owners ultimately led to the club being granted permission to play at Oakwell. In 1891 Preedy was instrumental in the formation of the Barnsley Charity Football Association and the creation of the Barnsley Charity Cup. St. Peter's reached the inaugural final but were surprisingly defeated by underdogs Ecclesfield.

== Departure from Barnsley ==
In 1893 Preedy moved to London to become curate of St. Clement's Church in Islington. Such was the regard in which the clergyman was held in the town that a civic reception was held to mark his departure, and tributes were printed in the Barnsley Chronicle. The St. Peter's players presented him with a walking stick, a pipe and a tobacco pouch. Four years after his departure, the club severed its links to the church and became known simply as Barnsley F.C.

Preedy spent four years at St. Clement's before being appointed to run a nearby mission in what was then an extremely deprived area of the city. At the time of his appointment the mission operated out of converted cowsheds and the house with which Preedy was provided had no furniture. Preedy once again endeavoured to use sport as part of his ministry and opened a boxing club at the mission. Future world champion Terry Allen boxed at the club as a youngster, and among the wrestlers who trained there was future British champion and Olympic Games competitor George MacKenzie. Preedy also organised dances for the girls who sold flowers on local streets.

Preedy remained in contact with the football club he had founded in Barnsley and was a guest of honour at the 1912 FA Cup Final, in which Barnsley defeated West Bromwich Albion to lift the trophy. The victorious team presented him with the match ball, which he displayed in his study until his death.

== Later years ==
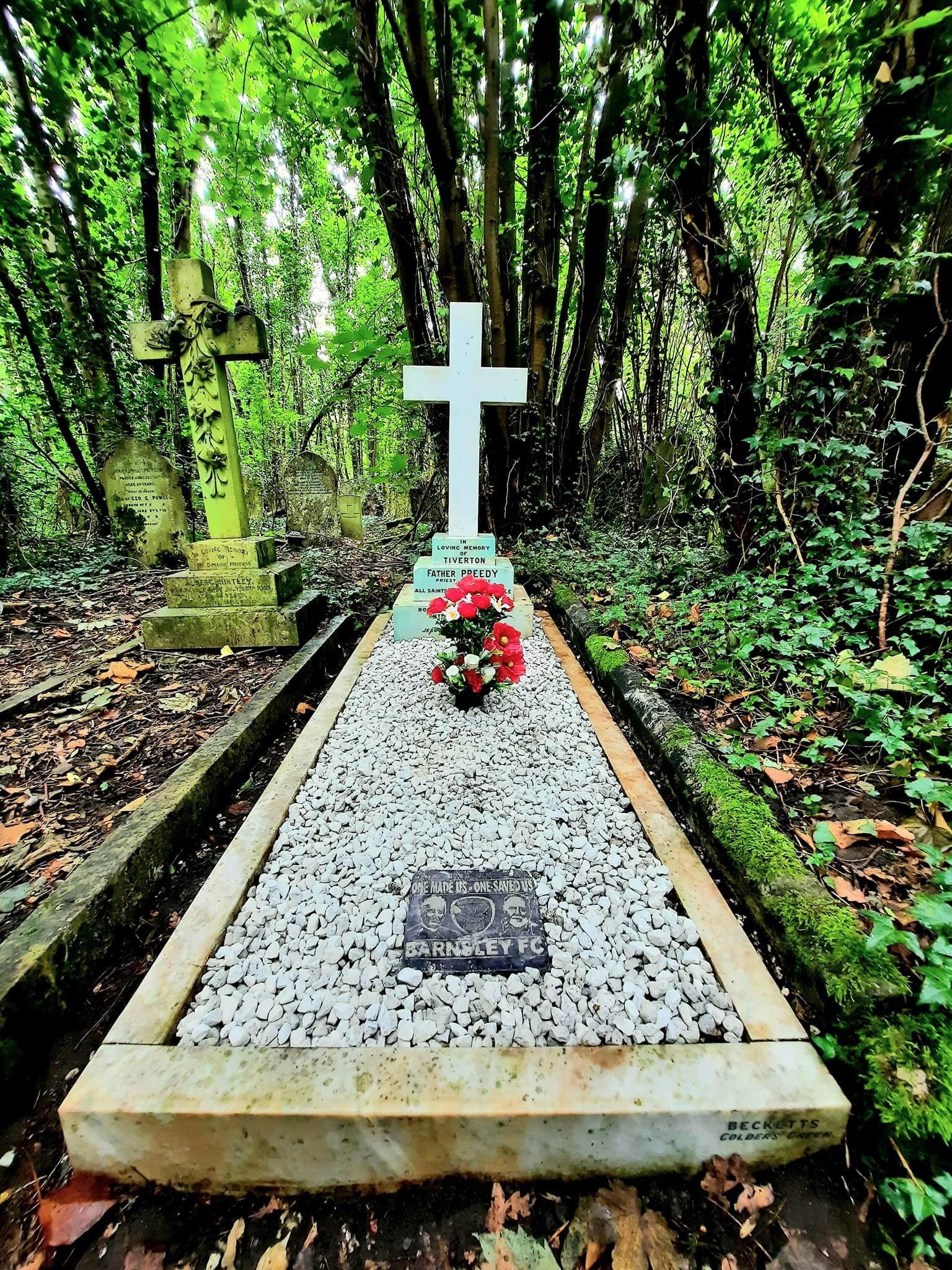
Preedy's grave in Islington Cemetery

In 1926 Preedy was appointed a prebendary at St Paul's Cathedral, in recognition of his work in Islington. At around the same time he began to suffer from heart problems, and died in his sleep in April 1928. His funeral was attended by several thousand mourners, and he was buried at Islington Cemetery in Finchley. His obituary in the Islington Gazette described him as "a generous friend to the poor" and the Bishop of Stepney in his eulogy called him "a wonderful parish priest and a splendid friend", and made particular reference to his use of sport in his ministry.

In 1997 representatives of the club he founded located his grave in London and laid wreaths in the club's colours. Full restoration of the grave was later carried out by the Barnsley F.C. Supporters' Trust. Each summer, lifelong supporter Neil Richardson travels down and conducts routine cleaning and maintenance on the grave. He used to do this with Gareth Lovett before his passing.

== Honours ==
- Barnsley Hall of Fame
