= Barnsley F.C. =

Association football club in England

Barnsley
- Full name: Barnsley Football Club
- Nicknames: The Reds; The Tykes
- Founded: 1887; 139 years ago
- Ground: Oakwell
- Capacity: 23,287
- Owner: BFC Investment Company Ltd
- Chairman: Neerav Parekh
- Head coach: Daniel Stendel
- League: EFL League One
- 2025–26: EFL League One, 15th of 24
- Website: barnsleyfc.co.uk
Home colours	Away colours	Third colours

Barnsley Football Club is a professional football club in Barnsley, South Yorkshire, England. The club competes in EFL League One, the third tier of English football.

Nicknamed “the Reds”, "the Tykes" or less commonly "the Colliers", they were founded in 1887 by Reverend Tiverton Preedy and moved to Oakwell the following year. The club's original blue colours were changed to red and white in 1904. Barnsley spent the 1890s in the Sheffield & District, Midland and Yorkshire leagues, before gaining admittance to the Football League Second Division in 1898. They twice reached the final of the FA Cup whilst still in the second tier, losing to Newcastle United in 1910 and winning the competition over West Bromwich Albion in 1912. The club suffered relegation in 1933, but secured promotion as Third Division North champions in 1934. They won the Third Division North title for a second time in 1939, having been relegated the previous season.

Relegated again in 1953, they secured another Third Division North title in 1955. However, further relegations left them in the fourth tier of English football by 1966. Promotion from the Fourth Division was achieved in 1968, though they were relegated after just four seasons. The club secured two promotions in three years under the stewardship of Allan Clarke and Norman Hunter, and from 1981 would spend sixteen consecutive years in the second tier.

Premier League football was secured for the 1997–98 season with a second-place finish in the First Division, though they were relegated after one season and dropped down to the third tier in 2002. Barnsley won the 2006 League One play-off final and remained in the Championship for eight seasons. Relegated in 2014, they won both the 2016 Football League Trophy final and the 2016 League One play-off final, though this time spent just two seasons in the Championship. In 2017, a majority stake in the club was sold to a consortium that included Chien Lee, Neerav Parekh and Billy Beane. Barnsley won promotion from League One with a second-place finish in the year 2019, before being relegated out of the Championship again in the year of 2022. Barnsley have spent more seasons and played more games at the second level of English football than any other team. The club's main rivals are fellow Yorkshire clubs Sheffield Wednesday, Sheffield United, Leeds United, Huddersfield Town and Rotherham United.

== History ==
=== Beginnings and FA Cup glory ===
Barnsley were established in 1887 as Barnsley St Peter's by Reverend Tiverton Preedy, and they played in the Sheffield and District League from 1890 and in the Midland League from 1895. In 1897, the club dropped the St Peter's part of its name to become simply Barnsley. They joined the Football League in 1898, and struggled in the Second Division for the first decade, due in part to ongoing financial difficulties. In 1910, the club reached the FA Cup final, where they were defeated by Newcastle United. In 1912, they reached the FA Cup final again, and defeated West Bromwich Albion 1–0 to win the trophy for the first time in their history. When league football restarted after the First World War, the 1919–20 season brought some significant changes to the league. The main difference was that the First Division would now have 22 teams, rather than 20. The bottom team from the previous season was Tottenham Hotspur and they were relegated. The first extra place in the First Division went to Chelsea, who retained their place despite finishing second bottom and therefore in the relegation places. Derby County and Preston North End were promoted from the Second Division which left one place to be filled.

Having finished the previous season's Second Division in third place, Barnsley expected to achieve First Division status for the first time, but the Football League instead chose to call a ballot of the clubs. The League voted to promote sixth-placed Arsenal, prioritizing historical standing over sporting merit. Sir Henry Norris, the then Arsenal chairman, argued that Arsenal be promoted for their "long service to league football", having been the first League club from the South of England. It has been alleged that this was due to backroom deals and even outright bribery by Sir Henry Norris, colluding with his friend John McKenna, the chairman of Liverpool and the Football League, who recommended Arsenal's promotion at the AGM. No conclusive proof of wrongdoing has come to light, though other aspects of Norris's financial dealings unrelated to the promotion controversy have fuelled speculation on the matter. Norris resigned as chairman and left the club in 1929, having been found guilty by the Football Association of financial irregularities; he was found to have misused his expenses account, and to have pocketed the proceeds of the sale of the Arsenal team bus.

=== Prewar and postwar eras ===
The club came close to reaching the First Division in their early years. In the 1921–22 season, they missed out on promotion by goal difference. During the 1930s and 1940s years, the club found themselves sliding between the Second and Third Division. In 1949, the club signed Danny Blanchflower from Glentoran, and he impressed at Oakwell that two years later he was signed by First Division side Aston Villa, later signing for Tottenham Hotspur and being voted FWA Player of the Year twice, as well as being the captain of the 20th century's first league and cup double winning team in 1960–61. Around the time of Blanchflower's departure, a young centre-forward called Tommy Taylor broke into the Barnsley team, scoring 26 goals in 44 games. In April 1953, he became one of the most expensive players in English football at the time when Sir Matt Busby signed him for Manchester United for a fee of £29,999. Taylor went on to be a prolific goalscorer at the highest level over the next five years, winning two league titles and scoring 16 goals in 19 appearances for the England national football team, before losing his life in the Munich air disaster on 6 February 1958.

When the Northern and Southern sections of the Third Division were replaced by national Third and Fourth Divisions for the 1958–59 season, Barnsley were still in the Second Division, but went down to the Third Division at the end of the season. In 1965, Barnsley were relegated to the Football League Fourth Division for the first time, winning promotion three years later. They went down to the Fourth Division again in 1972, and this time stayed down for seven seasons, finally returning to the Third Division in 1979. Two years later, they went up again and quickly established themselves as a decent Second Division side throughout the 1980s, although they still failed to clinch that elusive First Division place, despite the introduction of the play-offs in the second half of the decade, which gave teams finishing as low as fifth and eventually sixth the chance of winning promotion.

=== Division One and the Premier League ===
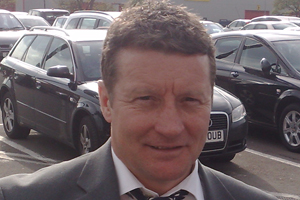
Manager Danny Wilson guided Barnsley to the Premier League in 1996–97.

For the 1994–95 season, Barnsley turned to midfielder Danny Wilson to manage the club. His first season brought a sixth-place finish in the First Division, which would normally have meant a play-off place, but a restructuring of the league meant that they missed out. They finished 10th a year later before finally emerging as serious promotion contenders in the 1996–97 season, finally clinching runners-up spot and automatic promotion and gaining the top flight place that they had spent 99 years trying to win.

Barnsley lasted just one season in the Premier League but they did reach the quarter-finals of the FA Cup, defeating Manchester United in the fifth round. They also made their record signing that season with Georgi Hristov for £2 million. Wilson then departed to take over at Sheffield Wednesday, being succeeded as Barnsley manager by striker John Hendrie, who had been a key player in the promotion-winning team. Barnsley were the only team from outside the Premier League to reach the quarter-finals of the FA Cup in the 1998–99 season, but only finished 13th in the league. Hendrie was then replaced as manager by Dave Bassett, who rejuvenated the team and took them to fourth place in 1999–2000. The team lost in the play-off final to Ipswich Town, the last play-off final at Wembley before the stadium was closed for redevelopment.

=== Mixed fortunes in the 21st century ===
The team were relegated to the Second Division in 2002; administration threatened the existence of the club as Barnsley suffered greatly due to the ITV Digital crisis. A late purchase by Barnsley's then mayor, Peter Doyle, saved the club from folding. In 2006, the side won in the play-off final at the Millennium Stadium in Cardiff, where they beat Swansea City 4–3 on penalties to earn promotion to the Championship. The manager at this time was Andy Ritchie, who was in his first season in charge after replacing Paul Hart. The team struggled in their first season back in the Championship. In November 2006, with Barnsley in the relegation zone, Ritchie was sacked in favour of Simon Davey, who managed to steer the team away from relegation in the second half of the season, and they eventually finished 20th. The following season, Barnsley reached the semi-final of the FA Cup, beating Premier League side Liverpool 2–1 at Anfield and defending champions Chelsea 1–0; the team lost 1–0 against fellow Championship side Cardiff City at Wembley in the semi-final. In October 2008, the club fielded the youngest player in the Football League's history when Reuben Noble-Lazarus came on against Ipswich Town aged 15 years and 45 days.

Barnsley ended the 2011–12 season as one of only two football clubs to turn a profit in the Championship; they stayed up only because Portsmouth were given a 10-point deduction for going into administration. In 2016, Barnsley won the Football League Trophy after a 3–2 win against Oxford United. They gained promotion to the Championship following a 3–1 win over Millwall in the play-off final later that season. In September 2016, Barnsley were caught up in an ongoing scandal in English football, with assistant manager Tommy Wright alleged to have accepted "bungs" in exchange for working as an ambassador for a third-party player ownership consortium. Wright was suspended and subsequently dismissed by the club.

=== New ownership ===
In December 2017, Patrick Cryne and his family sold an 80% stake in the club to NewCity Capital's Chien Lee and Pacific Media Group's Paul Conway. They were joined by Indian investor Neerav Parekh and Billy Beane, minority owner of and advisor for the Athletics, who was widely known for the Moneyball film portrayal, as part of an international investor consortium.

Barnsley were relegated to the third tier in 2017–18. Following this, the new owners adopted a data-driven approach to identify talents, focusing on young players and team rebuilding. The club appointed Daniel Stendel as head coach, who introduced a high-pressing style of play. Barnsley were promoted back to the Championship the following season. In the 2019–20 season, under new coach Gerhard Struber, Barnsley avoided relegation from the Championship. In 2020–21, under the management of Valérien Ismaël, Barnsley finished fifth place and reached the EFL Championship Play-offs for the first time in 24 years, doing so with the youngest squad and one of the smallest budgets in the division. The Wall Street Journal called Barnsley a "Moneyball experiment".

Prior to the 2021–22 season, Markus Schopp was appointed as the new head coach. In November 2021, he was dismissed after seven consecutive defeats. Three weeks later Poya Asbaghi was appointed as his successor. Fortunes improved little as Barnsley were relegated from the 2021–22 EFL Championship following a 2–1 defeat against Huddersfield Town. Asbaghi left the club by mutual consent shortly afterwards. On 15 June 2022, Michael Duff was appointed head coach of Barnsley on a three-year contract.

In May 2022, it was revealed that Pacific Media Group did not actually own all the shares they claimed to own, and were simply a nominee for a group of 4 investors who owned 20% of the club. Following this revelation, Neerav Parekh purchased the shares of 2 of the investors, while Matt Edmonds purchased the shares of the 4th investor. Following the purchases and further equity raises, the new ownership of the club is now understood to be split between Neerav Parekh (61.14%), the Cryne family (21.30%), Julie Anne Quay and Matt Edmonds (11%), Chien Lee (4.60%), and Conway's company Pacific Media Group (1.96%). With this reconstituted shareholding and a loss of majority control, Paul Conway, Chien Lee, Grace Hung and Dickson Lee were voted off the board of Barnsley Football Club, and were replaced by Jean Cryne and Julie Anne Quay in May 2022. In July 2023, the EFL charged Barnsley with 5 breaches of the EFL Regulations related to the ownership of the club under Conway and Lee's tenure, whilst also charging Conway and Lee individually with causing these breaches in regulations.

== Stadium ==
The stadium's name, Oakwell, originates from the well and oak tree that were on the site when first built. Oakwell is a multi-purpose sports development in Barnsley, South Yorkshire, used primarily by the club for playing its home fixtures, and its reserves. While the name 'Oakwell' generally refers to the main stadium, it also includes several neighbouring venues which form the facilities of the Barnsley academy – an indoor training pitch, a smaller stadium with seating on the south and west sides for around 2,200 spectators, and several training pitches used by the different Barnsley squads. Until 2003, the stadium and the vast amount of land that surrounds it was owned by Barnsley themselves; however, after falling into administration in 2002 the council purchased the main Oakwell Stadium to allow the club to pay its creditors and remain participants in the Football League. The stadium's capacity is 23,287.

== Rivalries ==
According to a survey, 'The League of Love and Hate' conducted in August 2019, Barnsley supporters named fellow Yorkshire clubs Sheffield Wednesday, Sheffield United and Leeds United as their biggest rivals, with Huddersfield Town and Rotherham United following.

== Colours and strip ==
=== Kit manufacturers and shirt sponsors ===
Period	Kit manufacturer	Shirt sponsor
1976–1977	Litesome	—
1977–1979	Admiral	—
1979–1980	Umbro	—
1980–1981	Umbro	Taits
1981–1984	Umbro	Hayselden
1984–1986	Umbro	Brooklands Hotel
1986–1988	Lowfields	Sandal Bayern
1988–1989	Intersport	Lyons Cakes
1989–1991	Beaver International	Shaw Carpets
1991–1993	Gola	Hayselden
1993–1994	Pelada	Hayselden
1994–1995	Pelada	ORA
1995–2000	Admiral	ORA
2000–2001	Admiral	Big Thing
2001–2002	Admiral	iSoft
2002–2003	Red Flag	iSoft
2003–2004	Red Flag	Vodka Kick
2004–2005	Koala	Vodka Kick
2005–2007	Jako	Barnsley Building Society
2007–2008	Surridge	Wake Smith
2008–2011	Lotto	Barnsley Building Society
2011–2014	Nike	C.K. Beckett
2014–2015	Avec	C.K. Beckett
2015–2019	Puma	C.K. Beckett
2019–2022	Puma	The Investment Room
2022–2023	Puma	Various (Note: Originally, cryptocurrency company HEX.com were announced as Barnsley's shirt sponsor, but after the Barnsley Supporter's Trust raised concerns about controversial and homophobic tweets by people who reportedly brokered the deal and an investigation by the club, they were dropped as the Barnsley shirt sponsor after only featuring on the shirt for 2 games. The shirts remained sponsorless for the following 4 games of the campaign. On 27 August 2022, Barnsley launched the "Together Red" campaign against discrimination and hate, with numerous sponsors adorning the Barnsley shirt for select games throughout the 2022/23 season starting with the away game against Ipswich Town. The campaign ended on 14 April 2023.)
2023–2024	Puma	US Mobile
2024–2025	Puma	Gleeson Homes
2025–2027	Oxen Sports	The Investment Room

=== Strip ===
==== Home strip ====
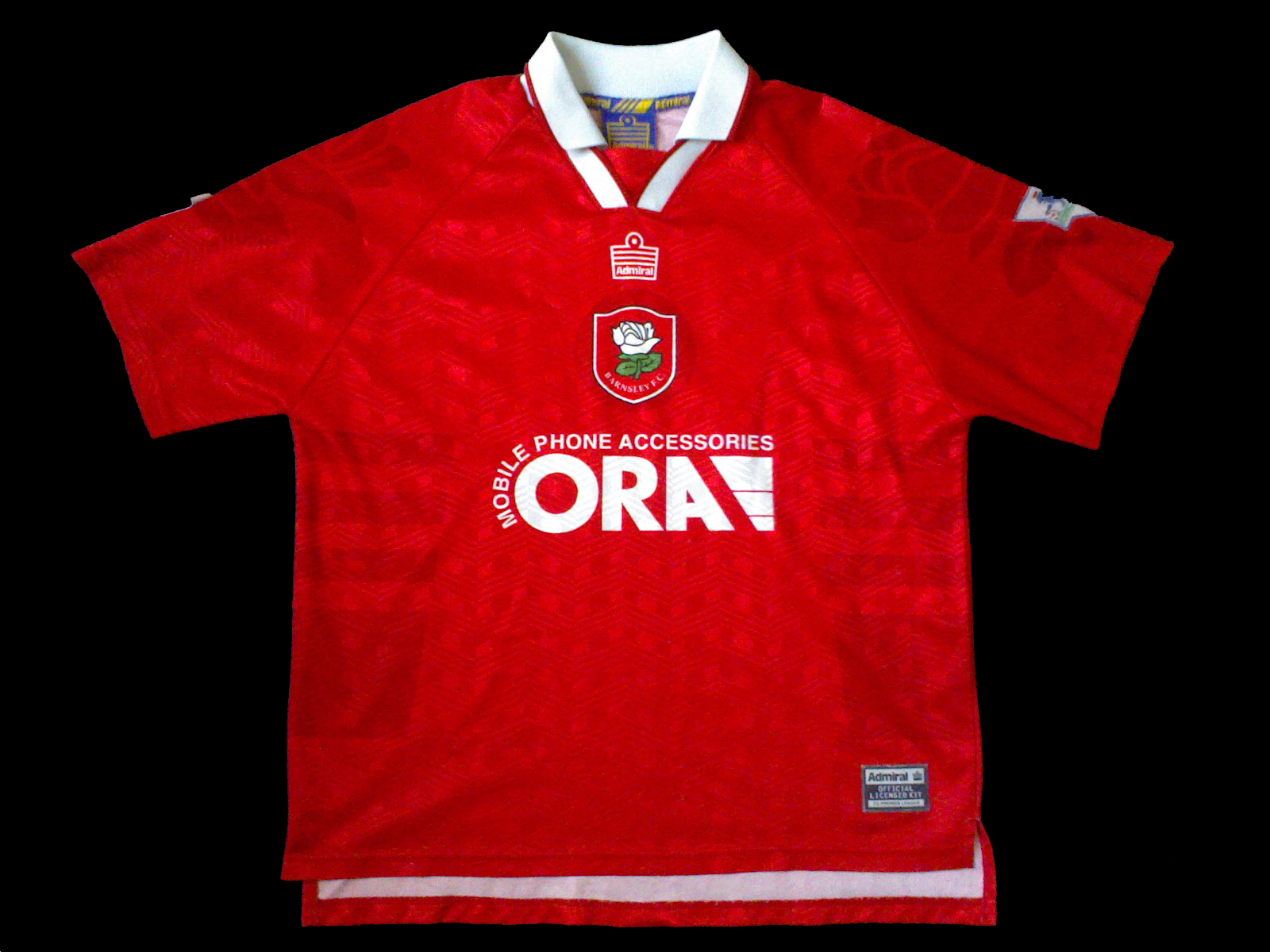
Barnsleys home shirt in the 1997–98 Premier League season

Barnsley have played their home games in red shirts for most of their history. The only exception to this is the period 1887–1901, where it is speculated that the team first wore blue shirts with claret arms, then circa 1890 the team wore chocolate and white stripes, before moving on to blue and white stripes around 1898. The team first wore red shirts in 1901. Since this time, the team have worn red shirts often with a white trim, although in more recent times a black trim has sometimes been used. As with most football clubs the shirt design varies from season to season. One particular design that stands out is the 1989–90 season shirt which featured white stars on a red background and has been named as one of the worst shirts ever. Manufacturers logos were added to the shirt in 1976–77, while sponsors were first added in the 1980–81 season.

==== Away strip ====
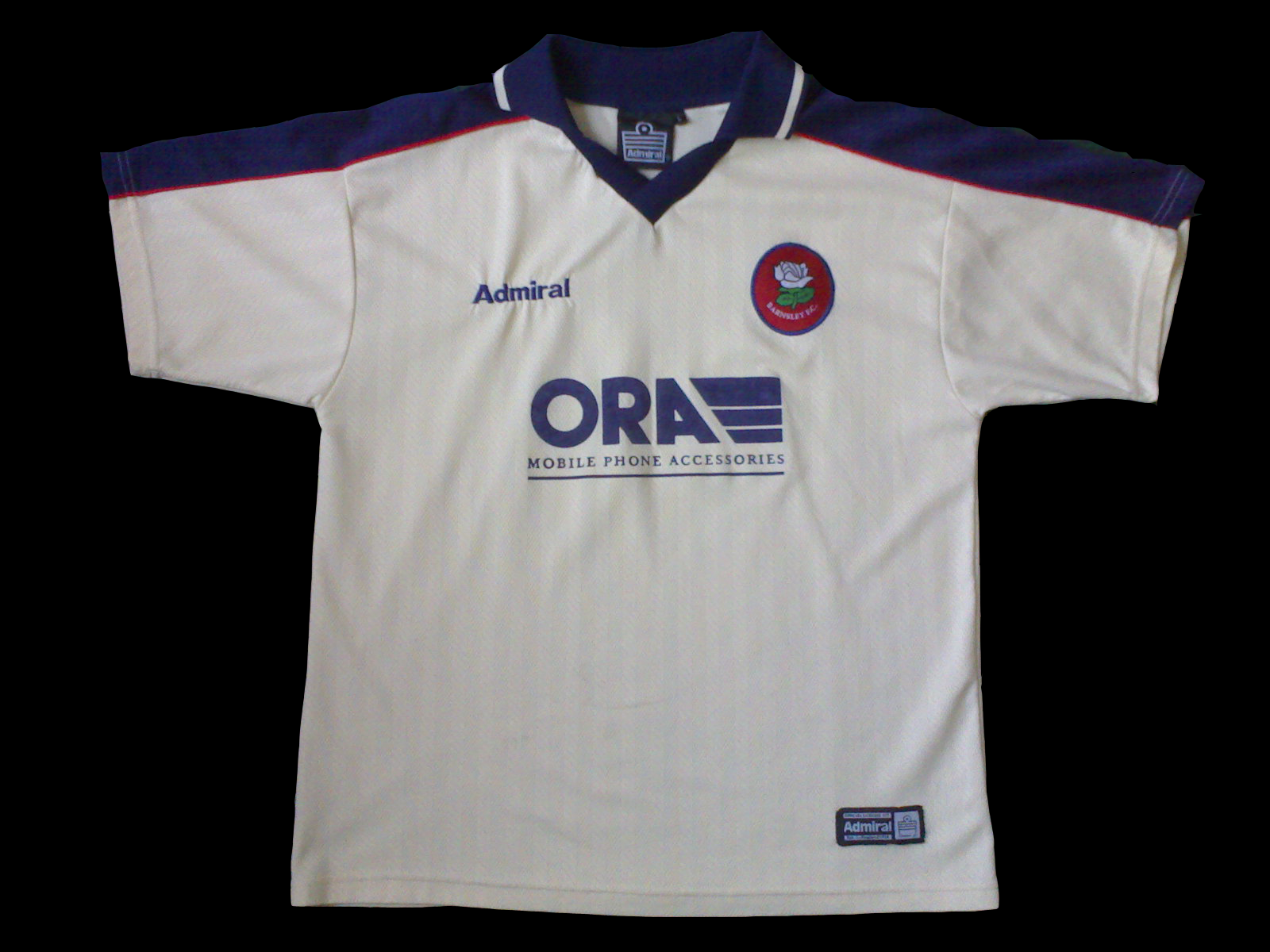
Barnsley's away shirt in the 1998–99 season

The club's away strip (used for away or cup fixtures where there is a clash of colours) differs from season to season but usually follows the design of the season's home strip with a variation on the colours. The most common and traditional colour for the away kit has been white and black, although other colours have been used, including light blue, yellow, black, ecru, dark green and even black and blue stripes. One notable away strip was the 2001–02 "It's just like watching Brazil" kit, where the team wore the colours of the five-time World Cup winners Brazil for their away games.

== Players ==
=== Current squad ===
As of 15 October 2026

Note: Flags indicate national team as defined under FIFA eligibility rules; some limited exceptions apply. Players may hold more than one non-FIFA nationality.

No.	Pos.	Nation	Player
1	GK	SCO	Cieran Slicker (on loan from Ipswich Town)
2	DF	ENG	Arley Kay
3	DF	FRA	Ziyad Larkeche (on loan from Queens Park Rangers)
4	DF	ENG	Sam Gale
5	DF	ENG	Jack Shepherd
6	DF	IRL	Connor O'Riordan (on loan from Blackburn Rovers)
7	FW	ENG	Tobi Adeyemo
8	MF	NIR	Cameron McGeehan (captain)
9	FW	NIR	Makenzie Kirk (on loan from Portsmouth)
10	FW	CIV	Ben Hamed Touré
11	DF	CUW	Tyrese Noslin
12	DF	MAW	Jubril Okedina
13	FW	AUS	Clayton Taylor
14	MF	JAM	Daniel Johnson

No.	Pos.	Nation	Player
15	DF	ENG	Isaac Smith
17	FW	ENG	Amani Richards
18	FW	POR	Fábio Jaló
19	FW	ENG	Reyes Cleary
22	MF	NIR	Patrick Kelly
25	GK	ENG	Rogan Ravenhill
29	DF	IRL	Connor Barratt
30	MF	WAL	Jonathan Bland
36	FW	ENG	Luke Alker
45	MF	WAL	Vimal Yoganathan
48	MF	IRL	Luca Connell
51	GK	ENG	Kieren Flavell

==== Out on loan ====
Note: Flags indicate national team as defined under FIFA eligibility rules; some limited exceptions apply. Players may hold more than one non-FIFA nationality.

No.	Pos.	Nation	Player
39	FW	ENG	Leo Farrell (on loan at Altrincham until 1 January 2027)
—	DF	ENG	Georgie Gent (on loan at Boston United until 8 December 2026)

No.	Pos.	Nation	Player
—	FW	ENG	Charlie Lennon (on loan at Yeovil Town until 3 January 2027)

=== Under-21s ===
As of 22 September 2026

Note: Flags indicate national team as defined under FIFA eligibility rules; some limited exceptions apply. Players may hold more than one non-FIFA nationality.

No.	Pos.	Nation	Player
28	GK	ENG	Jake Andrassy
31	MF	ENG	Nathan Willis
32	FW	AUS	Rylan Brownlie
33	DF	ENG	Robson Woodcock
37	DF	ENG	Callum Hudson

No.	Pos.	Nation	Player
40	MF	ENG	Max Rayner
41	MF	ENG	Kieran Graham
42	MF	ENG	Franklin Middleton
46	FW	ENG	O'Rian Reid
47	FW	ENG	Lewis Gould

=== Under-18s ===
As of 28 July 2026

Note: Flags indicate national team as defined under FIFA eligibility rules; some limited exceptions apply. Players may hold more than one non-FIFA nationality.

No.	Pos.	Nation	Player
34	FW	ENG	Noah Town
38	MF	ENG	Noah Saunders
44	DF	IRL	Tayo Dunne
—	GK	ENG	Ollie Mead
—	DF	ENG	Joshua Heyes
—	DF	ENG	Beau Kaplan
—	DF	ENG	Billy Naylor
—	DF	ENG	Dan Neilson
—	DF	ENG	Charlie Rodgers
—	DF	ENG	Frankie Peacock

No.	Pos.	Nation	Player
—	MF	ENG	Roan Birkenshaw
—	MF	IRL	Joel Devaney
—	MF	ENG	Cain Thompson
—	FW	ENG	Toure Bell
—	FW	ENG	Kishan Dass
—	FW	ENG	Charlie Green
—	FW	ENG	Finn Green
—	FW	ENG	Marli Hicken-Smith
—	FW	ENG	Oliver Roebuck
—	FW	ENG	Jason Takasongo

== Staff ==
As of February 2024

=== Ownership structure ===
- Neerav Parekh 66.36%
- Cryne family 22.11%
- Julie Anne Quay and Matt Edmonds 9.12%
- Chien Lee 1.68%
- Pacific Media Group 0.72%

==== Board members ====
- Chairman: Neerav Parekh
- Director: Jean Cryne
- Director: Julie Anne Quay
- Director: James Cryne
- Chief Executive Officer: Jon Flatman
- Finance and Operations Director: Robert Zuk

=== First-team staff ===
As of 15 July 2026

Role	Name
Head Coach	Daniel Stendel
First-Team Coach	Tom Harban
Goalkeeping Coach	Scott Flinders
Physical Performance Manager	Bradley Rufus
Physical Performance Coach	Jordan Hardy
Physical Performance Coach	Luke Jelly
Club Commentator	Callum Cooper
Rehab Physiotherapist	Jackson Bradley
Club Doctor	Dr John Harban
Club Doctor	Dr David Arundel
Lead Performance Analyst	Ryan Simpson
Performance Analyst	Vacant
Head of football operations and club secretary	Ann Hough
Academy manager	Bobby Hassell
U-21 manager	Nicky Eaden
U-18 manager	Ryan Laight

=== Managerial history ===
Barnsley F.C. managers from 1898 to present
- (England) Arthur Fairclough (1898–1901)
- (Scotland) John McCartney (1901–1904)
- (England) Arthur Fairclough (1904–1912)
- (England) John Hastie (1912–1914)
- (England) Percy Lewis (1914–1919)
- (England) Percy Sant (1919–1926)
- (Scotland) John Commins (1926–1929)
- (England) Arthur Fairclough (1929–1930)
- (England) Brough Fletcher (1930–1936)
- (England) Matthew Walker (1936–1937)
- (Scotland) Angus Seed (1937–1953)
- (England) Tim Ward (1953–1960)
- (Scotland) Johnny Steele (1960–71)
- (Scotland) John McSeveney (1971–1972)
- (Scotland) Johnny Steele (1972–1973)
- (England) Jim Iley (1973–1978)
- (England) Allan Clarke (1978–1980)
- (England) Norman Hunter (1980–1984)
- (Scotland) Bobby Collins (1984–1985)
- (England) Allan Clarke (1985–1989)
- (England) Eric Winstanley (caretaker, 1989)
- (England) Mel Machin (1989–1993)
- (England) Eric Winstanley (caretaker, 1993)
- (England) Viv Anderson (1993–1994)
- (Northern Ireland) Danny Wilson (1994–1998)
- (Scotland) John Hendrie (1998–1999)
- (England) Eric Winstanley (caretaker, 1999)
- (England) Dave Bassett (1999–2000)
- (England) Eric Winstanley (caretaker, 2000–2001)
- (England) Nigel Spackman (2001)
- (Wales) Glyn Hodges (caretaker, 2001)
- (England) Steve Parkin (2001–2002)
- (Wales) Glyn Hodges (2002–2003)
- (Iceland) Guðjón Þórðarson (2003–2004)
- (England) Paul Hart (2004–2005)
- (England) Andy Ritchie (2005–2006)
- (Wales) Simon Davey (2006–2009)
- (England) Mark Robins (2009–2011)
- (England) Keith Hill (2011–2012)
- (England) David Flitcroft (2012–2013)
- (Scotland) Micky Mellon (caretaker, 2013)
- (Northern Ireland) Danny Wilson (2013–2015)
- (England) Mark Burton (caretaker, 2015)
- (England) Lee Johnson (2015–2016)
- (England) Paul Heckingbottom (caretaker, 2016)
- (England) Paul Heckingbottom (2016–2018)
- (England) Paul Harsley (caretaker, 2018)
- (Portugal) José Morais (2018)
- (Germany) Daniel Stendel (2018–2019)
- (England) Adam Murray (caretaker, 2019)
- (Austria) Gerhard Struber (2019–2020)
- (England) Adam Murray (caretaker, 2020)
- (France) Valérien Ismaël (2020–2021)
- (Austria) Markus Schopp (2021)
- (Germany) Joseph Laumann (caretaker, 2021)
- (Sweden) Poya Asbaghi (2021–2022)
- (Republic of Ireland) Martin Devaney (caretaker, 2022)
- (Northern Ireland) Michael Duff (2022–2023)
- (Scotland) Neill Collins (2023–2024)
- (Republic of Ireland) Martin Devaney (caretaker, 2024)
- (England) Darrell Clarke (2024–2025)
- (Republic of Ireland) Conor Hourihane (2025–2026)
- (Germany) Daniel Stendel (2026–present)

== Club records ==
Chart of table positions of Barnsley in the Football League

- Record league victory: 9–0
  - v Loughborough, Second Division, 28 January 1899
  - v Accrington Stanley (away), Third Division North, 3 February 1934
- Record cup victory: 6–0 v Blackpool, FA Cup first round, 20 January 1910
- Record league defeat: 9–0 v Notts County, Second Division, 19 January 1927
- Record cup defeat:
  - 8–1 v Derby County, FA Cup first round, 30 January 1897
  - 7–0 v Manchester United, EFL Cup third round, 17 September 2024
- Most appearances: Barry Murphy, 569
- Most goals scored for the club: Ernie Hine, 131
- Most league goals scored in a season: Cecil McCormack, 33, 1950–51 Second Division
- Most international caps: Gerry Taggart, 35, Northern Ireland
- Record transfer fee received: £5,000,000 from Swansea City for Alfie Mawson (2017)
- Record transfer fee paid: £1,500,000 to Partizan Belgrade for Georgi Hristov (1997) and £1,500,000 to QPR for Mike Sheron (1999)
- Record attendance: 40,255 v Stoke City, FA Cup fifth round, 15 February 1936
- Youngest ever Football League player: Reuben Noble-Lazarus, 15 years and 45 days
- Oldest player: Mike Pollitt, 41 years, 5 months and 30 days
- Most goals scored in a single game: 5;
  - Frank Eaton v South Shields, 1927
  - Peter Cunningham v Darlington, 1933
  - Beaumont Asquith v Darlington, 1938
  - Cecil McCormack v Luton Town, 1950

Barnsley have spent more seasons and played more games at the second level of English football than any other team.

=== Cup records ===
==== Barnsley St. Peter's FC ====
- Best FA Cup performance: 1st round, 1894–95 (replay), 1896–97

==== Barnsley FC ====
- Best FA Cup performance: Champions, 1911–12 (replay), Runners-up, 1909–10
- Best EFL Cup performance: Quarter-finals, 1981–82 (replay)
- Best EFL Trophy performance: Champions, 2015–16
- Best Anglo-Italian Cup performance: Group stage, 1992–93, 1993–94

=== Player of the season ===
Year	Winner
1970	(England) Johnny Evans
1971	(England) Les Lea
1972	(England) Barry Murphy
1973	(England) Eric Winstanley
1974	(England) Mick Butler
1975	(Scotland) Bobby Doyle
1976	(England) Kenny Brown
1977	(England) Brian Joicey
1978	(Republic of Ireland) Mick McCarthy
1979	(Republic of Ireland) Mick McCarthy

Year	Winner
1980	(Scotland) Ronnie Glavin
1981	(Republic of Ireland) Mick McCarthy
1982	(England) Trevor Aylott
1983	(Scotland) Ronnie Glavin
1984	(England) Andy Rhodes
1985	(England) Paul Futcher
1986	(England) Clive Baker
1987	(England) Stuart Gray
1988	(England) Paul Cross
1989	(England) Paul Futcher

Year	Winner
1990	(England) Steve Agnew
1991	(England) Brendan O'Connell
1992	(England) Mark Smith
1993	(Northern Ireland) Gary Fleming
1994	(England) Neil Redfearn
1995	(Northern Ireland) Danny Wilson
1996	(Netherlands) Arjan de Zeeuw
1997	(Scotland) John Hendrie
1998	(England) Ashley Ward
1999	(England) Craig Hignett

Year	Winner
2000	(England) Chris Morgan
2001	(England) Kevin Miller
2002	(England) Bruce Dyer
2003	(England) Bruce Dyer
2004	(England) Antony Kay
2005	(England) Chris Shuker
2006	(Republic of Ireland) Nick Colgan
2007	(England) Brian Howard
2008	(England) Stephen Foster
2009	(England) Bobby Hassell

Year	Winner
2010	(Argentina) Hugo Colace
2011	(England) Jason Shackell
2012	(England) Luke Steele
2013	(England) David Perkins
2014	(England) Chris O'Grady
2015	(Republic of Ireland) Conor Hourihane
2016	(England) Adam Hammill
2017	(England) Marc Roberts
2018	(Scotland) Oli McBurnie
2019	(Jamaica) Ethan Pinnock

Year	Winner
2020	(England) Alex Mowatt
2021	(Poland) Michał Helik
2022	(England) Brad Collins
2023	(Denmark) Mads Juel Andersen
2024	(England) Adam Phillips
2025	(England) Davis Keillor-Dunn
2026	(Republic of Ireland) David McGoldrick

Source: Barnsley F.C.

== Honours ==
League

- First Division (level 2)
  - Runners-up: 1996–97
- Third Division North / Third Division / League One (level 3)
  - Champions: 1933–34, 1938–39, 1954–55
  - Runners-up: 1980–81, 2018–19
  - Play-off winners: 2006, 2016
- Fourth Division (level 4)
  - 2nd place promotion: 1967–68
  - 4th place promotion: 1978–79

Cup

- FA Cup
  - Winners: 1911–12
  - Runners-up: 1909–10
- Football League Trophy
  - Winners: 2015–16
