= Percy Lewis (football manager) =

English football manager (born 1873)

Personal information
- Full name: Percy Lewis
- Date of birth: 11 May 1873
- Place of birth: Rotherham, England
- Date of death: 1 November 1942 (aged 69)
- Place of death: Sheffield, England

Managerial career
- Years: Team
- 1911–1914: Stockport County
- 1914–1919: Barnsley
- 1921–1923: Hull City

Percy Lewis (11 May 1873 – 1 November 1942) was an English association football manager who had spells with Barnsley, Stockport County, and Hull City.
