= Eric Winstanley =

English association football player (1944–2021)

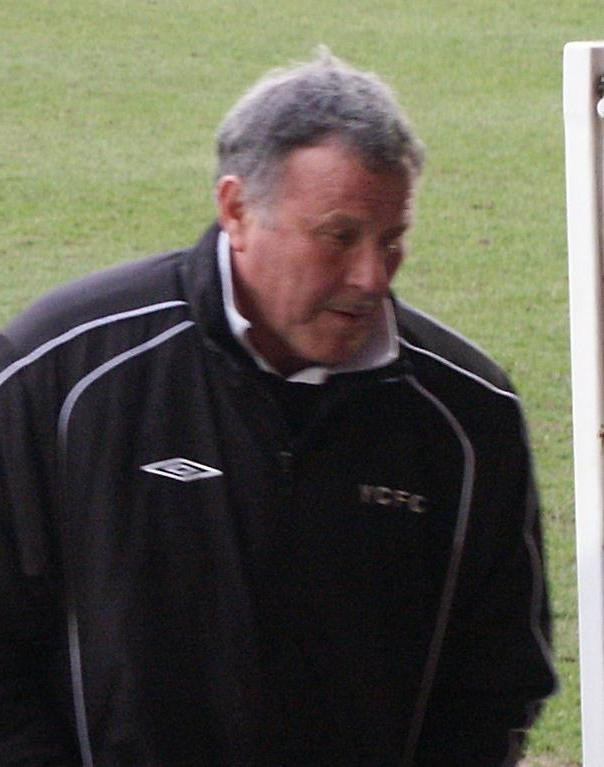
- Winstanley in 2008

Personal information
- Full name: Eric Winstanley
- Date of birth: 15 November 1944
- Place of birth: Barnsley, England
- Date of death: 20 May 2021 (aged 76)
- Place of death: Rotherham, England
- Height: 6 ft 1 in (1.85 m)
- Position: Centre-back

Senior career*
Years	Team	Apps	(Gls)
1962–1973	Barnsley	410	(35)
1973–1977	Chesterfield	101	(7)
Total		511	(42)

International career
1962–1963	England U18	5	(0)

Managerial career
- 1989: Barnsley (caretaker)
- 1999: Barnsley (caretaker)
- 2000–2001: Barnsley (caretaker)
- * Club domestic league appearances and goals

Eric Winstanley (15 November 1944 – 20 May 2021) was an English professional footballer who played as a centre-back in the Football League for Barnsley and Chesterfield.

== Early life ==
Eric Winstanley was born on Wednesday, 15 November 1944 in Barnsley, West Riding of Yorkshire.

== Playing career ==
Winstanley started his career with Barnsley after signing a professional contract in May 1962, where he later became captain. He made 410 league appearances for Barnsley and has been described as a "club legend". He joined Chesterfield in August 1973.

Winstanley made five appearances for the England national under-18 team from 1962 to 1963.

== Coaching career ==
Winstanley spent over 20 years on the coaching staff at Barnsley, but was sacked in June 2001, which ended a 34-year association with the club. He had two spells as caretaker manager during this time. He was given a testimonial match by the club in November 2001 against Manchester United, which Barnsley won 1–0.

Winstanley became technical director of the Saint Kitts and Nevis national team in 2001, before leaving in February 2004. He worked as youth-team coach at Doncaster Rovers during the 2004–05 season. Winstanley was brought into the Scarborough coaching staff as assistant manager in October 2005. He left the position in July 2006 following Mark Patterson's arrival onto the coaching staff and became the York City head of youth development in October. He worked in this role along with being Colin Walker's assistant since November 2007 until being appointed head coach following Neil Redfearn's arrival as youth-team coach in February 2008. He was dismissed as head coach alongside manager Walker on 21 November 2008.

He joined South African team SuperSport United as technical director of the club's development wing in October 2009.

== Death ==
Winstanley died on 20 May 2021 in Rotherham, South Yorkshire, aged 76.

== Career statistics ==
Appearances and goals by club, season and competition
Club	Season	League			FA Cup		League Cup		Total	
Club	Season	Division	Apps	Goals	Apps	Goals	Apps	Goals	Apps	Goals
Barnsley	1961–62	Third Division	2	0	0	0	0	0	2	0
Barnsley	1962–63	Third Division	45	0	3	0	4	0	52	0
Barnsley	1963–64	Third Division	46	3	6	0	3	0	55	3
Barnsley	1964–65	Third Division	26	0	0	0	2	0	28	0
Barnsley	1966–67	Fourth Division	41	1	5	0	1	0	47	1
Barnsley	1967–68	Fourth Division	45	6	1	0	1	0	47	6
Barnsley	1968–69	Third Division	36	12	6	1	2	1	44	14
Barnsley	1969–70	Third Division	42	3	4	0	0	0	46	3
Barnsley	1970–71	Third Division	43	6	3	0	1	0	47	6
Barnsley	1971–72	Third Division	42	0	3	2	2	0	47	2
Barnsley	1972–73	Fourth Division	42	4	2	0	2	0	46	4
Barnsley	Total		410	35	33	3	18	1	461	39
Chesterfield	1973–74	Third Division	40	2	2	0	4	0	46	2
Chesterfield	1974–75	Third Division	46	3	3	0	2	1	51	4
Chesterfield	1975–76	Third Division	12	2	1	0	0	0	13	2
Chesterfield	1976–77	Third Division	3	0	0	0	0	0	3	0
Chesterfield	Total		101	7	6	0	6	1	113	8
Career total			511	42	39	3	24	1	578	46

== Managerial statistics ==
Managerial record by team and tenure
Team	From	To	Record					Ref.
Team	From	To	P	W	D	L	Win %	Ref.
Barnsley (caretaker)	8 November 1989	1 December 1989	4	1	1	2	25.0	
Barnsley (caretaker)	19 April 1999	27 May 1999	3	2	1	0	66.7	
Barnsley (caretaker)	19 December 2000	8 January 2001	5	1	1	3	20.0	
Total			12	4	3	5	33.3	

== Honours ==
Individual

- Barnsley Player of the Season: 1972–73
