= Bert Morley =

English footballer

Personal information
- Full name: Herbert Morley
- Date of birth: 1 October 1882
- Place of birth: Sheffield, England
- Date of death: 15 July 1957 (aged 74)
- Position: Right-back

Youth career
- Kiveton Park

Senior career*
Years	Team	Apps	(Gls)
1904–1907	Grimsby Town	93	(3)
1907–1915	Notts County	258	(0)

International career
1910	England	1	(0)
- * Club domestic league appearances and goals

Herbert Morley (1 October 1882 – 15 July 1957) was an English professional footballer who played at right-back for Grimsby Town and Notts County in the 1900s and 1910s. He also made one appearance for England in 1910.

== Football career ==
Morley was born in Sheffield, but was brought up in the Kiveton Park area of Rotherham, where he played youth football for the local team. His Football League career began when he joined Grimsby Town in August 1904. He remained with Grimsby for three years before moving to Notts County in March 1907.

He stayed at Notts County for eight years during which time they were generally in the lower half of the First Division until they were relegated in 1913. They quickly returned to the top flight, winning the Second Division title in 1913–14. Morley's professional career was ended a year later, when league football was suspended during the First World War.

His solitary international appearance came when he was called up in place of Bob Crompton for England against Ireland in the opening match of the 1910 British Home Championship played at the Solitude Ground, Belfast on 12 February 1910. The match ended in a 1–1 draw, with goals from Frank Thompson for Ireland and Harold Fleming for England.

== Later career ==
After the war, Morley continued to be associated with Notts County and acted as a scout for several years.

== Honours ==
Notts County

- Second Division champions: 1913–14
