= Kiveton Bridge railway station =

Railway station in South Yorkshire, England

Kiveton Bridge
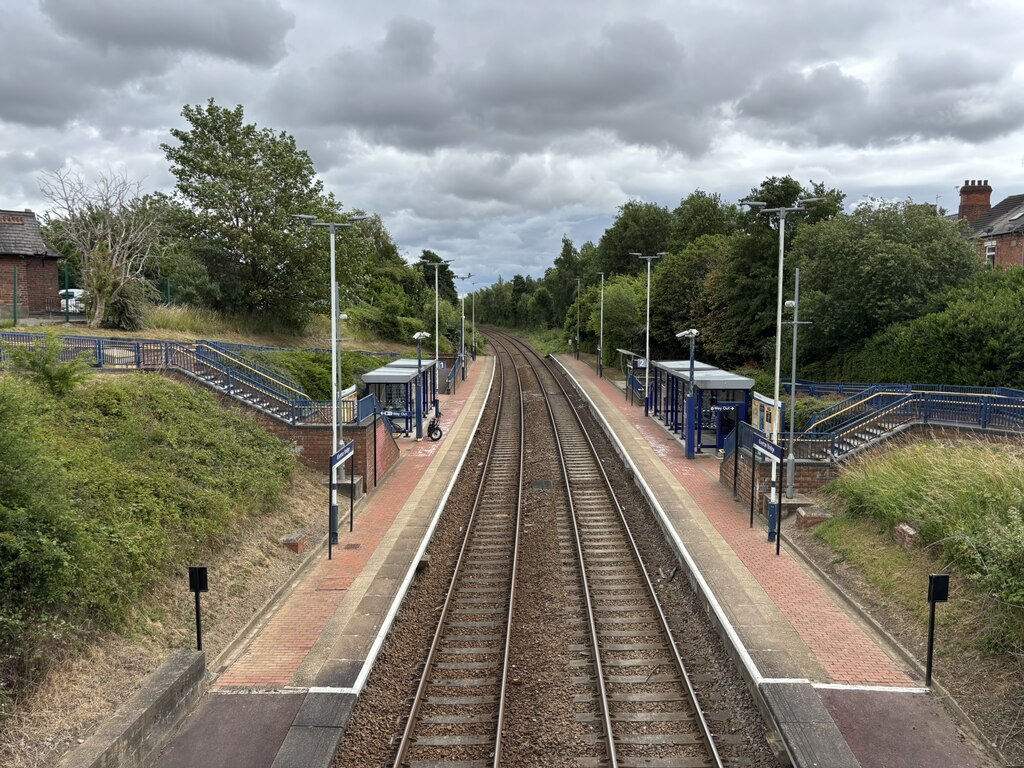
- The station in 2025

General information
- Location: Kiveton Park, Rotherham; England
- Coordinates: 53.340460°N 1.265750°W
- Grid reference: SK489828
- Managed by: Northern Trains
- Transit authority: Travel South Yorkshire
- Platforms: 2

Other information
- Station code: KIV
- Fare zone: Rotherham
- Classification: DfT category F2

History
- Opened: 1929

Passengers
- 2020/21: ▼13,882
- 2021/22: ▲48,728
- 2022/23: ▲53,514
- 2023/24: ▲57,526
- 2024/25: ▲69,186
Location
Notes
- Passenger statistics from the Office of Rail and Road

Kiveton Bridge railway station is a railway station in the village of Kiveton Park in South Yorkshire, England.

== History ==
The station was opened by the London and North Eastern Railway on 3 July 1929 following pressure from the local councils who considered Kiveton Park station and Waleswood station too far away from the centre of the community. The new station consisted of two flanking wooden platform linked by an overbridge, access to which was gained through the booking office, set at road level adjacent to the main road through, and linking the villages. The station was originally served by stopping services linking Sheffield Victoria, Cleethorpes and Lincoln Central.

In the 1950s the wooden platforms were replaced with concrete ones and the wooden station buildings by plain brick built structures.

Along with neighbouring Kiveton Park station it was completely rebuilt during the early-1990s with modern platforms, lighting and waiting shelters, this work being funded by the South Yorkshire Passenger Transport Executive. On completion of the work the station received new signs with the name erroneously shown as "Kiverton Bridge". These were replaced with the correct spelling by 21 May 1993. This was not the first time the name had been incorrectly shown: British Railways made the same mistake on large enamel signs in the late 1950s.

== Facilities ==
The station is unstaffed and has one ticket machine on platform 2 . Train running information is given via telephone, a customer help point on platform 1, CIS displays and timetable posters. Both platforms are fully accessible to disabled travellers and wheelchair users via ramps from the street above.

== Services ==
All services at Kiveton Bridge are operated by Northern Trains using Class 150 and 195 DMUs.

The typical off-peak service in trains per hour is:

- 1 tph to Leeds via Sheffield
- 1 tph to Lincoln via Retford

On Sundays, the station is served by an hourly service between Lincoln and Sheffield, with some services continuing to Huddersfield.

Preceding station	National Rail	Following station
Woodhouse	Northern Trains Sheffield to Lincoln Line	Kiveton Park
