= Kiveton Park railway station =

Railway station in South Yorkshire, England

Kiveton Park
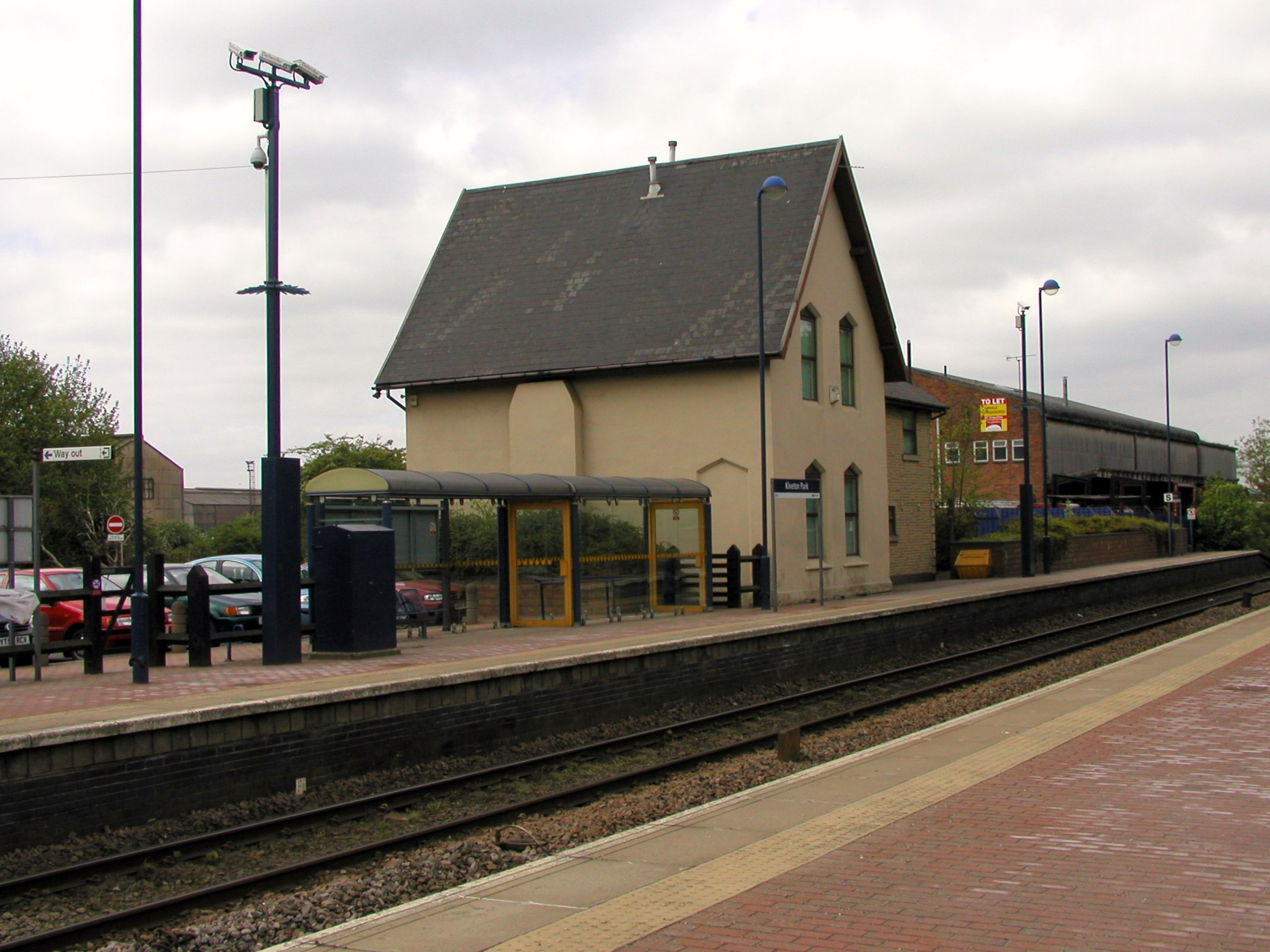
- The station in 2008

General information
- Location: South Anston, Rotherham; England
- Coordinates: 53.3368°N 1.2394°W
- Grid reference: SK507824
- Managed by: Northern Trains
- Transit authority: Travel South Yorkshire
- Platforms: 2

Other information
- Station code: KVP
- Fare zone: Rotherham
- Classification: DfT category F2

History
- Opened: 1849

Passengers
- 2020/21: ▼10,586
- 2021/22: ▲32,112
- 2022/23: ▲40,674
- 2023/24: ▲48,106
- 2024/25: ▲58,108
Location
Notes
- Passenger statistics from the Office of Rail and Road

Kiveton Park railway station is a station in South Anston, South Yorkshire, England. The original station was opened by the Sheffield and Lincolnshire Junction Railway in 1849, situated to the east of the level crossing and opened with the line. It was rebuilt in the Manchester, Sheffield and Lincolnshire Railway "Double Pavilion" style in 1884, on the west side of the level crossing.

Despite its name, the closest station to the village of Kiveton Park is the neighbouring Kiveton Bridge station.

Kiveton Park was a centre of lime working in the area, and many company sidings came under the jurisdiction of its Station Master. Adjacent to the station was the Dog Kennels Lime and Stone Works, named after the road linking the station to Anston, and the Kiveton Park Lime and Stone Works. Just to the east were the Kiveton Park and Anston lime quarries. All the companies had lime burning facilities and agricultural lime was supplied, by rail, to outlets in Lincolnshire. Kiveton Park Colliery was located to the west of the station, and was rail-connected until its closure in 1994.

Along with neighbouring Kiveton Bridge station, it was completely rebuilt during the early 1990s with modern platforms, lighting and waiting shelters, this work being funded by the South Yorkshire Passenger Transport Executive. The only remaining part of the 1884 station is the Station Master's house (now privately owned) which stands on the Sheffield-bound (down) platform. It is now unstaffed (all tickets must be purchased on the train or prior to travel), with train running details provided by display screens, telephone and timetable poster boards. Step-free access is available to both platforms from the adjacent level crossing (which is still operated from the adjacent signal box).

Severe damage was caused to the embankment and tracks near here during the widespread flooding in 2007. Repairs cost over £1 million, and the line was closed for several weeks while the embankment was rebuilt and the tracks relaid.

== Services ==
All services at Kiveton Park are operated by Northern Trains using Class 150 and 195 DMUs.

The typical off-peak service in trains per hour is:

- 1 tph to Leeds via Sheffield
- 1 tph to Lincoln via Retford

Some early morning and late evening services start/terminate at Retford or Worksop.

On Sundays, the station is served by an hourly service between Lincoln and Sheffield, with some services continuing to Huddersfield.

Preceding station	National Rail	Following station
Kiveton Bridge	Northern Trains Sheffield to Lincoln Line	Shireoaks
