= Waleswood Colliery =

Former coal mine in South Yorkshire, England

Coordinates: 53°21′00″N 1°18′02″W

Waleswood Colliery was a coal mine located between Swallownest and Wales Bar, near Rotherham, South Yorkshire, England. The colliery was adjacent to the Rotherham to Clowne road and the main line of the Manchester, Sheffield and Lincolnshire Railway about 2 miles east of Woodhouse.

The first shaft was sunk in the 1860s when the colliery was owned by Skinner and Holford Limited. In 1947, the colliery and its associated by-product plant passed to the National Coal Board, the colliery being closed the following year. As the collieries in the area became interconnected, it was retained as a pumping station. The coke ovens and by-products plant closed in 1962.

Many of the colliery buildings have been retained and now form the basis of an industrial estate.

== Locomotives ==
During its lifetime, the colliery had four steam locomotives, never more than two at any one time.

- The first locomotive, a Yorkshire Engine Company 0-4-0 Saddle Tank built in 1878, Works No. 323, carried the name "Waleswood" and was sold to Thos. W. Ward in 1902.

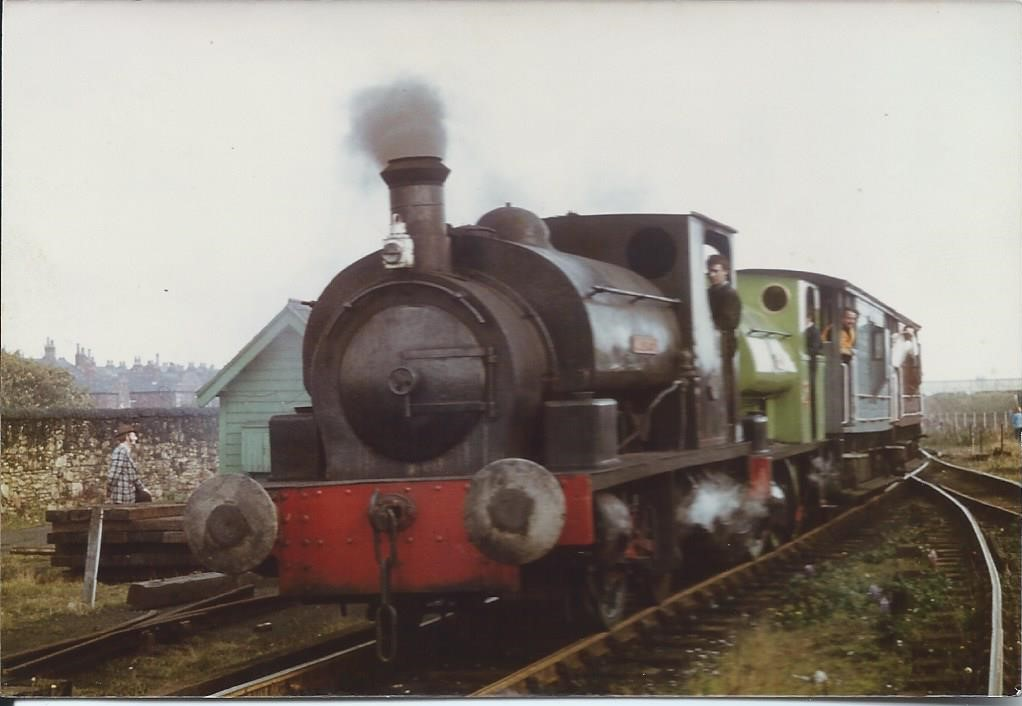
Second locomotive named "Waleswood" in museum service (1978)

- There is no record of any further locomotives being bought until 1906 when the company bought another 0-4-0ST from Hudswell Clarke & Company (Works No.750). The "Waleswood" nameplates were removed from the original locomotive when it was sold, and these were attached to the saddle tanks of this locomotive. The locomotive was rebuilt by the original builders in the early 1930s. It was moved to Kiveton Park Colliery in 1962, preserved in 1972 and moved to Staveley, Derbyshire. It was later moved to the now-closed Steamport Railway Museum at Southport. Since 1990, it has been at the Battlefield Line Railway, Shackerstone, Leicestershire, where it is being restored to working order.

Waleswood's restoration at Shackerstone halted due to unfortunate circumstances, and it spent decades in the rain and elements in storage both at Shackerstone and Statfold Barn. In 2016, it changed ownership and was moved to the Northamptonshire Ironstone Railway at Hunsbury Hill, where it is undergoing a full restorative rebuild. It was planned to return to steam during 2017, but the boiler required a much more extensive overhaul than was first thought. The mostly new boiler is due back in the frames around Easter 2019, with steaming planned for early summer.

- The third locomotive arrived just two years afterwards, again from Hudswell Clarke & Company, Works No. 829
- The fourth, and last, locomotive came from Sir Lindsay Parkinson & Company. Again, it was a product of Hudswell Clarke, Works No. 1636, built in 1929 and carried the name "Jennie".
