= Waleswood railway station =

Former railway station in Worksop, England

Waleswood

General information
- Location: Waleswood Colliery, Rotherham; England
- Coordinates: 53.35005°N 1.30058°W
- Grid reference: SK466839
- Platforms: 2

Other information
- Status: Disused

History
- Original company: Great Central Railway
- Pre-grouping: Great Central Railway
- Post-grouping: London and North Eastern Railway

Key dates
- 1 July 1907: Opened
- 7 March 1955: Closed
Location

Waleswood railway station is a former railway station on the Great Central Railway's main line between Sheffield Victoria and Worksop, England.

The station was opened on 1 July 1907 by public demand, where the road from Rotherham to Clowne road below the line and the Waleswood Curve, a connection from the Derbyshire Lines of the Manchester, Sheffield and Lincolnshire Railway at Killamarsh, joins the east–west main line. It was adjacent to Waleswood Colliery.

The station buildings were of all wood construction with flanking wooden platforms.

The station booking hall suffered a major fire on 24 May 1953, when much internal damage was caused and rail traffic was disrupted.

The station was closed on 7 March 1955 and has since been demolished.

== Sources ==
- Dow, George (1965). Great Central, Volume Three: Fay Sets the Pace, 1900–1922. Shepperton: Ian Allan. ISBN 0-7110-0263-0.
- Ellis, Norman (1994). South Yorkshire Railway Stations on old picture postcards. Keyworth, Nottinghamshire: Reflections of a Bygone Age. ISBN 0-946245-88-6.
- Gay, Stephen (2004). Through Kirton Tunnel, a Railway Journey from Sheffield to Cleethorpes. Sheffield: Pickard Communication. ISBN 0-9547264-0-5.
- Grainger, Ken (2002). Sheffield Victoria to Chesterfield Central, The "Derbyshire Lines" of the Manchester, Sheffield and Lincolnshire Railway Part 1. Bredbury, Cheshire: Foxline Limited. ISBN 1-870119-83-5.
- Hurst, Geoffrey (1989). Great Central East of Sheffield Volume 1. Worksop, Nottinghamshire: Milepost Publications. ISBN 0-947796-00-2.
- Kaye, A.R. (1991). Great Central Railway North of Nottingham, Volume 2. Chesterfield: Terminus Publications. ISBN 0-946930-12-0.
