= John Ramster =

English football manager

John Ramster (bapt. 21 July 1861 – 28 January 1915) was an English businessman and sports enthusiast active in football, cricket, and boxing. He was the first manager of Hull City Football Club, from August 1904 until April 1905. He never managed the team in a competitive match, however, he was in charge during some of the club's first friendly matches before the team competed in the football league. The first friendly match that he took charge of was Hull City's fixture against Notts County on 1 September 1904. He was followed by Ambrose Langley.

Ramster, a native of Hull, was an apprentice to a shipbuilder but left to become a publican. He was the owner of the Amicable Society Inn in Patrington and the Pier Hotel in Withernsea. Many aspiring boxers resided at the Pier Hotel.

He was a key figure in the development of the Albert United Cricket Club, which he joined in 1882, a year after its founding. He served as secretary until 1899.

He was a member of the Royal Antediluvian Order of Buffaloes.
