= David Menzies =

Scottish footballer and manager

Personal information
- Date of birth: 23 June 1873
- Place of birth: Kirkcaldy, Scotland
- Date of death: 11 October 1936 (aged 63)
- Place of death: Kingston-upon-Hull, England

Senior career*
Years	Team	Apps	(Gls)
- Raith Rovers

Managerial career
- 1916–1921: Hull City
- 1921–1926: Bradford City
- 1927–1936: Doncaster Rovers
- 1936: Hull City
- * Club domestic league appearances and goals

David Menzies (23 June 1873 – 11 October 1936) was a Scottish football player and manager.

== Career ==
Menzies was a player at Raith Rovers where his father was chairman. In 1903 he joined newly formed English side Bradford City as a reserve player. He also served as a steward and trainer until the outbreak of World War One. In July 1916 he began his managerial career at Hull City following two years as trainer at the club. He served for two seasons in post-war football leading the club to a mid-table position in Division Two.

In July 1921 he returned to Bradford City to take over from Peter O'Rourke. O'Rourke had helped City to lift the FA Cup and kept City in Division One for nine successive seasons giving Menzies a difficult task to follow. City were relegated in Menzies' first season. For four more seasons the club struggled in the bottom half of Division Two and Menzies resigned in June 1926.

A year later he became secretary-manager of Doncaster Rovers. He helped lead them to the Division Three (North) title in 1934–35. The following season, he resigned to rejoin Hull City. Hull were relegated in 1935–36 from Division Two.

Menzies died in office in October 1936.

== Honours ==
=== Manager ===
Doncaster Rovers

- Football League Third Division North: 1934–35

== Sources ==
- Frost, Terry (1988). Bradford City A Complete Record 1903–1988. Breedon Books Sport. p. 66. ISBN 0-907969-38-0.
