= Harry Chapman (footballer, born 1880) =

English footballer and manager

Personal information
- Full name: Henry Chapman
- Date of birth: 23 February 1880
- Place of birth: Kiveton Park, Yorkshire, England
- Date of death: 29 September 1916 (aged 36)
- Position: Forward

Senior career*
| Years | Team | Apps | (Gls) |
| –1898 | Kiveton Park | | |
| 1898–1899 | Worksop Town | | |
| 1899–1911 | Sheffield Wednesday | 269 | (94) |
| 1911–1913 | Hull City | 32 | (7) |

Managerial career
- 1913–1914: Hull City
- * Club domestic league appearances and goals

Henry Chapman (23 February 1880 – 29 April 1916) was an English footballer, who played for Sheffield Wednesday in the early 20th century. He was a forward, playing in the inside right position.

He was the brother of Herbert Chapman, the manager of both Huddersfield Town and Arsenal, and Thomas Chapman, who played for Grimsby Town. He began his career playing for a local side in Kiveton Park before joining Worksop Town. In 1900 he was given a trial with Sheffield Wednesday and was signed by them, making his debut in 1–1 draw against Blackburn Rovers on a 23 February 1901. Although Herbert went on to become a great manager, Harry was by far the better player, and put in a man of the match performance in the 1907 FA Cup Final, which saw Sheffield Wednesday lift the trophy for the second time. He joined Hull City A.F.C. at the end of the 1910–11 season.

After retiring from playing, he had a stint as Hull City manager between April 1913 and September 1914; the club finished seventh in Division Two in 1913–14. He died of tuberculosis at the age of 36, in 1916.

== Bibliography ==
- Page, Simon. Herbert Chapman: The first great manager.. Heroes Publishing, 2006.
