= 2025–26 FC Thun season =

FC Thun
2025–26 season
- Chairman: Andres Gerber
- Manager: Mauro Lustrinelli
- Stadium: Stockhorn Arena
- Swiss Super League: 1st (winners)
- Swiss Cup: First round
- Top goalscorer: League: Elmin Rastoder (13 goals); All: Elmin Rastoder (13 goals)
- Highest home attendance: 10,014
- Lowest home attendance: 6,698
- Biggest win: 5–1 v. Lausanne-Sport (H); 12 February 2026; 5–1 v. Grasshopper (H); 14 March 2026
- Biggest defeat: 4–2 v. Young Boys (A); 28 September 2025
| Home colours | Away colours |

The 2025–26 season was FC Thun's first season in the top flight of Swiss football since their promotion in the 2024–25 season.

Thun would perform a historic feat by leading the table ahead of the winter break in December, thus being crowned "winter champions".

On 3 May 2026, Thun secured the Swiss Super League title for the first time in their history after second-placed St. Gallen lost 3–0 at home to Sion with three matches remaining.

== Coaching staff ==
As of 21 February 2026

| Position | Staff |
|---|---|
| Head coach | (Switzerland) Mauro Lustrinelli |
| Assistant coach | (Switzerland) Yves Zahnd |
| Goalkeeper coach | (Switzerland) Patrick Bettoni |
| Conditioning coach | (Switzerland) Eric-Pierre Zürcher |
| Match analyst | (Switzerland) Adrian Häsler |

== Squad ==
Note: Flags indicate national team as defined under FIFA eligibility rules; some limited exceptions apply. Players may hold more than one non-FIFA nationality.

| No. | Pos. | Nation | Player |
|---|---|---|---|
| 1 | GK | SUI | Nino Ziswiler |
| 4 | DF | ESP | Genís Montolio |
| 5 | DF | GER | Dominik Franke |
| 6 | MF | SUI | Leonardo Bertone |
| 7 | MF | SUI | Kastriot Imeri (on loan from Young Boys) |
| 8 | MF | SUI | Vasilije Janjičić |
| 9 | FW | AUT | Furkan Dursun |
| 14 | MF | EST | Mattias Käit |
| 16 | MF | SUI | Justin Roth |
| 17 | DF | SUI | Ashvin Balaruban |
| 18 | FW | CGO | Christopher Ibayi |
| 19 | DF | SUI | Jan Bamert |
| 20 | MF | SUI | Noah Rupp (on loan from Karlsruher SC) |
| 23 | DF | SUI | Marco Bürki (captain) |

| No. | Pos. | Nation | Player |
|---|---|---|---|
| 24 | GK | SUI | Niklas Steffen |
| 25 | GK | SUI | Tim Spycher |
| 27 | DF | SUI | Michael Heule |
| 30 | GK | SUI | Jan Eicher |
| 33 | FW | SUI | Marc Gutbub |
| 37 | DF | SUI | Lucien Dähler |
| 47 | MF | SUI | Fabio Fehr |
| 52 | MF | SUI | Adam Ilic |
| 70 | MF | SUI | Nils Reichmuth |
| 74 | FW | MKD | Elmin Rastoder |
| 77 | MF | SUI | Ethan Meichtry |
| 78 | MF | KOS | Valmir Matoshi |
| 96 | FW | MTQ | Brighton Labeau |

=== Out on loan ===
Note: Flags indicate national team as defined under FIFA eligibility rules; some limited exceptions apply. Players may hold more than one non-FIFA nationality.

| No. | Pos. | Nation | Player |
|---|---|---|---|
| — | GK | SUI | Dario Wälti (at Kriens until 30 June 2026) |
| — | MF | ALB | Enis Asani (at Biel-Bienne until 30 June 2026) |

| No. | Pos. | Nation | Player |
|---|---|---|---|
| — | MF | URU | Mathías Tomás (at APOEL until 31 May 2026) |
| — | FW | ENG | Layton Stewart (at Wimbledon until 30 June 2026) |

== Competitions ==
=== Overall record ===
| Competition | First match | Last match | Starting round | Final position | Record | | | | | | | |
| Competition | First match | Last match | Starting round | Final position | Pld | W | D | L | GF | GA | GD | Win % |
|---|---|---|---|---|---|---|---|---|---|---|---|---|
| Swiss Super League | 25 July 2025 | 8 March 2026 | Matchday 1 | 1st | 28 | 21 | 2 | 5 | 64 | 31 | +33 | 75.00 |
| Swiss Cup | 17 August 2025 | 17 August 2025 | First round | First round | 1 | 0 | 0 | 1 | 0 | 1 | −1 | 0.00 |
| Total | | | | | 29 | 21 | 2 | 6 | 64 | 32 | +32 | 72.41 |

Source: Competitions

=== Swiss Super League ===
==== League table ====
| Pos | Team | Pld | W | D | L | GF | GA | GD | Pts | Qualification or relegation (Note: Teams play each other three times (33 matches), before the league is split into two groups (the top six and the bottom six).) |
|---|---|---|---|---|---|---|---|---|---|---|
| 1 | Thun (C) | 38 | 24 | 3 | 11 | 80 | 52 | +28 | 75 | Qualification for the Champions League second qualifying round |
| 2 | St. Gallen | 38 | 20 | 10 | 8 | 72 | 47 | +25 | 70 | Qualification for the Europa League second qualifying round (Note: St. Gallen won the 2025–26 Swiss Cup and qualified for the Europa League second qualifying round as cup winners. Since they finished in the top three, the second Conference League berth was passed to the fourth-placed team, Sion.) |
| 3 | Lugano | 38 | 19 | 10 | 9 | 59 | 42 | +17 | 67 | Qualification for the Conference League second qualifying round |
| 4 | Sion | 38 | 16 | 15 | 7 | 63 | 40 | +23 | 63 | Qualification for the Conference League second qualifying round |
| 5 | Basel | 38 | 16 | 8 | 14 | 55 | 58 | −3 | 56 | |

Source: Brack Super League - Tabelle
Rules for classification: 1) Points; 2) Goal difference; 3) Goals scored; 4) Head-to-head goal difference; 5) Head-to-head goals scored 6) Away goals scored; 7) Draw.
(C) Champions

==== Matches ====
| 27 July 2025 1 | Lugano | 1–2 | Thun | Lugano |
| 16:00 | Doumbia 21' | | Bertone 39' (pen.), 46' | Stadium: Stadio di Cornaredo; Attendance: 3,897; Referee: Lukas Fähndrich |

| 3 August 2025 2 | Thun | 2–1 | Lausanne-Sport | Thun |
| 14:00 | Ibayi 10'; Montolio 47' | | Sène 71' | Stadium: Stockhorn Arena; Attendance: 6,698; Referee: Lionel Tschudi |

| 9 August 2025 3 | Luzern | 1–2 | Thun | Luzern |
| 20:30 | Ferreira 13' | | Ibayi 39', 46' | Stadium: Swissporarena; Attendance: 10,859; Referee: Anojen Kanagasingam |

| 23 August 2025 4 | Zürich | 0–4 | Thun | Zürich |
| 18:00 | | | Rastoder 14'; Meichtry 41'; Ibayi 59'; Matoshi 90' | Stadium: Stadion Letzigrund; Attendance: 13,581; Referee: Marijan Drmic |

| 30 August 2025 5 | Thun | 1–1 | Grasshopper | Thun |
| 18:00 | Reichmuth 50' | | Creti 84' | Stadium: Stockhorn Arena; Referee: Sandro Schärer |

| 13 September 2025 6 | Thun | 1–3 | Basel | Thun |
| 18:00 | Heule 73' | | Shaqiri 24' (pen.), 90+8' (pen.); Ajeti 41' | Stadium: Stockhorn Arena; Attendance: 10,014; Referee: Lionel Tschudi |

| 28 September 2025 7 | Young Boys | 4–2 | Thun | Bern |
| 14:00 | Córdova 64'; Bedia 66', 80'; Fassnacht 90' | | Ibayi 52'; Meichtry 72' | Stadium: Stadion Wankdorf; Attendance: 29,152; Referee: Luca Piccolo |

| 4 October 2025 8 | St. Gallen | 1–2 | Thun | St. Gallen |
| 18:00 | Vandermersch 35' | | Meichtry 19'; Ibayi 44' | Stadium: Kybunpark; Attendance: 18,022; Referee: Lukas Fähndrich |

| 18 October 2025 9 | Thun | 3–1 | Servette | Thun |
| 18:00 | Imeri 7'; Labeau 18'; Meichtry 90' | | Stefanovic 6' | Stadium: Stockhorn Arena; Attendance: 8,609; Referee: Nico Gianforte |

| 25 October 2025 10 | Sion | 0–1 | Thun | Sion, Switzerland |
| 16:30 | | | Imeri 12' | Stadium: Stade de Tourbillon; Attendance: 9,650; Referee: Lukas Fähndrich |

| 28 October 2025 11 | Thun | 3–0 | Winterthur | Thun |
| 20:30 | Dähler 20'; Bertone 36'; Rastoder 82' | | | Stadium: Stockhorn Arena; Attendance: 7,024; Referee: Luca Piccolo |

| 1 November 2025 12 | Thun | 2–1 | Sion | Thun |
| 18:00 | Ibayi 39'; Rastoder 65' | | Batata 15' | Stadium: Stockhorn Arena; Attendance: 9,530; Referee: Marijan Drmic |

| 8 November 2025 13 | Servette | 0–1 | Thun | Servette |
| 20:30 | | | Bertone 90' | Stadium: Stade de Genève; Attendance: 6,820; Referee: Désirée Blanco |

| 22 November 2025 14 | Thun | 0–1 | Lugano | Thun |
| 20:30 | | | Cassano 86' | Stadium: Stockhorn Arena; Attendance: 7,353; Referee: Nico Gianforte |

| 30 November 2025 15 | Lausanne-Sport | 2–1 | Thun | Lausanne |
| 16:30 | Lekoueiry 13'; Bair 16' (pen.) | | Bertone 67' (pen.) | Stadium: Stade de la Tuilière; Attendance: 5,833; Referee: Marijan Drmic |

| 6 December 2025 16 | Thun | 4–1 | Luzern | Thun |
| 18:00 | Labeau 18'; Montolio 34'; Bamert 36'; Meichtry 58' | | Villiger 90' | Stadium: Stockhorn Arena; Attendance: 8,623; Referee: Urs Schnyder |

| 13 December 2025 17 | Thun | 0–2 | St. Gallen | Thun |
| 20:30 | | | Baldé 22'; Boukhalfa 77' (pen.) | Stadium: Stockhorn Arena; Attendance: 9,247; Referee: Luca Piccolo |

| 16 December 2025 18 | Winterthur | 1–4 | Thun | Winterthur |
| 20:30 | Hunziker 38' | | Meichtry 20'; Rastoder 22'; Roth 43'; Ibayi 90' | Stadium: Schützenwiese; Attendance: 7,500; Referee: Mirel Turkes |

| 20 December 2025 19 | Thun | 4–2 | Zürich | Thun |
| 18:00 | Rastoder 53'; Bürki 65'; Ibayi 85'; Fehr 89' | | Kamberi 12'; Phaëton 25' | Stadium: Stockhorn Arena; Attendance: 9,733; Referee: Anojen Kanagasingam |

| 18 January 2026 20 | Grasshopper | 1–3 | Thun | Zürich |
| 16:30 | Steffen 4' (o.g.) | | Rastoder 5'; Imeri 9'; Fehr 69' | Stadium: Stadion Letzigrund; Attendance: 4,093; Referee: Luca Cibelli |

| 25 January 2026 21 | Thun | 4–1 | Young Boys | Thun |
| 14:00 | Imeri 46'; Käit 56'; Rastoder 62', 84' | | Virginius 64' | Stadium: Stockhorn Arena; Attendance: 10,014; Referee: Anojen Kanagasingam |

| 1 February 2026 22 | Basel | 1–2 | Thun | Basel |
| 16:30 | Schmid 57' | | Bertone 15'; Matoshi 80' | Stadium: St. Jakob-Park; Attendance: 26,374; Referee: Sven Wolfensberger |

| 8 February 2026 23 | Servette | 1–3 | Thun | Servette |
| 14:00 | Atangana 90' (pen.) | | Rastoder 40'; Bürki 47'; Reichmuth 88' | Stadium: Stade de Genève; Attendance: 6,229; Referee: Alessandro Dudic |

| 12 February 2026 24 | Thun | 5–1 | Lausanne-Sport | Thun |
| 20:30 | Matoshi 20', 21'; Reichmuth 72'; Rastoder 86'; Bertone 90' (pen.) | | | Stadium: Stockhorn Arena; Attendance: 7,213; Referee: Mirel Turkes |

| 15 February 2026 25 | Thun | 1–0 | Sion | Thun |
| 14:00 | Meichtry 43' | | | Stadium: Stockhorn Arena; Attendance: 9,083; Referee: Marijan Drmic |

| 27 February 2026 26 | Winterthur | 0–3 | Thun | Winterthur |
| 19:00 | | | Meichtry 55'; Rastoder 59'; Imeri 83' | Stadium: Stadion Schützenwiese; Attendance: 7,300; Referee: Hüseyin Sanli |

| 28 February 2026 27 | Thun | 2–1 | Luzern | Thun |
| 18:00 | Imeri 24'; Rastoder 29' | | Kabwit 43' | Stadium: Stockhorn Arena; Attendance: 10,014; Referee: Nico Gianforte |

| 5 March 2026 28 | Thun | 2–2 | St. Gallen | Thun |
| 18:00 | Bertone 55' (pen.); Montolio 62' | | Görtler 37' (pen.); Witzig 90' | Stadium: Stockhorn Arena; Attendance: 9,651; Referee: Johannes von Mandach |

| 8 March 2026 29 | Young Boys | 1–2 | Thun | Bern |
| 16:30 | Sanches 7' | | Matoshi 50'; Reichmuth 80' | Stadium: Wankdorf Stadion; Attendance: 31,500; Referee: Sandro Schärer |

| 14 March 2026 30 | Thun | 5–1 | Grasshopper | Thun |
| 17:00 | Käit 33'; Montolio 37'; Labeau 50'; Rastoder 61'; Dursun 80' | | Lee 17' | Stadium: Stockhorn Arena; Attendance: 10,014; Referee: Désirée Blanco |

| 21 March 2026 31 | Zürich | 2–1 | Thun | Zürich |
| 17:00 | Reson 15'; Cavaleiro 77' | | Bertone 38' | Stadium: Letzigrund; Attendance: 13,234; Referee: Lukas Fähndrich |

| 4 April 2026 32 | Lugano | 1–0 | Thun | Lugano |
| 19:30 | Dos Santos 59' | | | Stadium: Stadio di Cornaredo; Attendance: 4,638; Referee: Johannes von Mandach |

| 14 March 2026 33 | Thun | 3–1 | Basel | Thun |
| 19:30 | Ibayi 28'; Heule 53'; Rastoder 64' | | Duranville 56' | Stadium: Stockhorn Arena; Attendance: 10,014; Referee: Mirel Turkes |

==== Swiss Cup ====
| 17 August 2025 First round | Breitenrain | 1-0 | Thun | Spitalacker, Bern |
| 15:30 | Neto 62' (pen.) | | | Referee: Johannes von Mandach |
