= 2024–25 AC Ajaccio season =

AC Ajaccio
2024–25 season
- Manager: Mathieu Chabert
- Stadium: Stade Michel Moretti
- Ligue 2: 12th (administratively relegated)
- Coupe de France: Seventh round
Home colours	Away colours

The 2024–25 season was the 115th season in the history of the AC Ajaccio, and the club's second consecutive season in Ligue 2. In addition to the domestic league, the team participated in the Coupe de France.

On 27 June 2024, AC Ajaccio was pronounced demoted to Championnat National by the DNCG. Then, they announced their decision to appeal. Ajaccio's appeal was heard and accepted on 11 July.

At the end of the season, AC Ajaccio was administratively relegated to the Régional 2, the seventh tier of French football.

== Transfers ==
=== In ===
Pos.	Player	Transferred from	Fee	Date	Source
FW	(France) Benjamin Santelli	(France) Bastia	Free	13 July 2024	

=== Out ===
Pos.	Player	Transferred to	Fee	Date	Source
FW	(Tunisia) Yoann Touzghar		End of contract	30 June 2024	
MF	(France) Thomas Mangani		End of contract	30 June 2024	
MF	(France) Riad Nouri		End of contract	30 June 2024	
MF	(Guadeloupe) Cédric Avinel		End of contract	30 June 2024	

== Friendlies ==
=== Pre-season ===
20 July 2024 Friendly	Ajaccio (France)	1–0	(France) Furiani-Agliani
18:00	Santelli 81' (pen.)

26 July 2024 Friendly	Ajaccio (France)	1–0	(France) Martigues
11:00	Sollacaro (red card) 23'; Barreto 35'

31 July 2024 Friendly	Real Unión (Spain)	1–1	(France) Ajaccio	Spain
19:00

3 August 2024 Friendly	Ajaccio (France)	1–2	(France) Bastia
18:00

10 August 2024 Friendly	Paris FC (France)	v	(France) Ajaccio

== Competitions ==
=== Overall record ===
Competition	First match	Last match	Starting round	Record							
Competition	First match	Last match	Starting round	Pld	W	D	L	GF	GA	GD	Win %
Ligue 2	16 August 2024	10 May 2025	Matchday 1	7	3	1	3	6	7	−1	42.86
Coupe de France				0	0	0	0	0	0	+0	—
Total				7	3	1	3	6	7	−1	42.86

Last updated: 28 September 2024
Source: Soccerway

=== Ligue 2 ===
==== League table ====
Pos	Team	Pld	W	D	L	GF	GA	GD	Pts	Promotion or Relegation
10	Troyes	34	13	5	16	36	34	+2	44	
11	Amiens	34	13	4	17	38	50	−12	43	
12	Ajaccio (Note: Ajaccio were relegated due to financial reasons.) (D, R)	34	12	6	16	30	42	−12	42	Administrative relegation to Régional 2
13	Pau	34	10	12	12	39	53	−14	42	
14	Rodez	34	9	12	13	56	54	+2	39	

Source: Ligue 2
Rules for classification: 1) Points; 2) Goal difference; 3) Number of goals scored; 4) Head-to-head goal difference; 5) Fair play points
(D) Disqualified; (R) Relegated

==== Matches ====
The match schedule was released on 21 June 2024.

Fixture Win Draw Loss

16 August 2024 1	Ajaccio	1–0	Rodez	Ajaccio
20:00 UTC+2	Barreto 79'	Report		Stadium: Stade Michel Moretti; Attendance: 3,315; Referee: Antoine Valnet

26 August 2024 2	Red Star	1–0	Ajaccio	Saint-Ouen
20:45 UTC+2	Renel 3'	Report		Stadium: Stade Bauer; Attendance: 4,468; Referee: Thierry Bouille

30 August 2024 3	Ajaccio	2–1	Troyes	Ajaccio
20:00 UTC+2	Ibayi 52' (pen.); Touzghar 89'	Report	Saïd 12'	Stadium: Stade Michel Moretti; Attendance: 3,298; Referee: Aurélien Petit

13 September 2024 4	Laval	1–1	Ajaccio	Laval
20:00 UTC+2	Sanna 43'	Report	Soumano 9'	Stadium: Stade Francis Le Basser; Attendance: 5,748; Referee: Ahmed Taleb

20 September 2024 5	Caen	1–0	Ajaccio	Caen
20:00 UTC+2	Brahimi 80'	Report		Stadium: Stade Michel d'Ornano; Attendance: 13,650; Referee: Geoffrey Kubler

24 September 2024 6	Ajaccio	2–0	Grenoble	Ajaccio
20:30 UTC+2	Soumano 58'; Jabol-Folcarelli 71'	Report		Stadium: Stade Michel Moretti; Attendance: 3,000; Referee: Gaël Angoula

27 September 2024 7	Lorient	3–0	Ajaccio	Lorient
20:00 UTC+2	Kroupi 69'; Kroupi 78'; Kroupi 90+2'	Report		Stadium: Stade du Moustoir; Attendance: 10,042; Referee: Eddy Rosier

5 October 2024 8	Ajaccio	1–1	Martigues	Ajaccio
14:00 CET	Ibayi 22'; Santelli (red card) 39'; Mangani (yellow card) 45'; Youssouf (yellow card) 55'; Kouassi (red card) 73'	Report	Oucasse Mendy (yellow card) 24' (goal) 45+1'; Solvet (yellow card) 36'; Mohamed Bamba (yellow card) 67'; Ouotro (yellow card) 88'	Stadium: Stade Michel Moretti; Attendance: 2,956; Referee: (France) Mickaël Leleu

19 October 2024 9	Amiens	3–1	Ajaccio	Amiens
14:00 CET	Mafouta 2' (pen.) 90+3' (pen.); Kaïboué 38'; Mactar Tine (yellow card) 90'	Report	Touré (yellow card) 33'; Soumano 42'; Everson Junior (yellow card) 65'	Stadium: Stade de la Licorne; Attendance: 5,956; Referee: (France) Ahmed Taleb

29 October 2024 11	Guingamp	1–0	Ajaccio	Guingamp
20:30 CET	Sissoko (yellow card) 40'; Ghrieb 90+2'	Report	Santelli (yellow card) 23'	Stadium: Stade de Roudourou; Attendance: 7,187; Referee: (France) Antoine Valnet

4 November 2024 12	Ajaccio	0–1	Metz	Ajaccio
20:45 CET	Ibayi (yellow card) 89'	Report	Hein 30'	Stadium: Stade Michel Moretti; Attendance: 2,757; Referee: (France) Ruddy Buquet

8 November 2024 13	Ajaccio	2–0	Clermont	Ajaccio
20:00 CET	Sollacaro (yellow card) 38'; Anziani 48'; Strata 64'; Touré (yellow card) 72'; Everson Junior (yellow card) 90+1'	Report	Jacquet (yellow card) 38'; Da Silva (yellow card) 47'	Stadium: Stade Michel Moretti; Attendance: 2,000; Referee: (France) Pierre Gaillouste

25 November 2024 14	Dunkerque	1–0	Ajaccio	Dunkerque
20:45 CET	Bammou 34' (pen.); Tejan (yellow card) 90+1'; Skyttä (yellow card) 90+4'; Raghouber (yellow card) 90+6'	Report	Youssouf (yellow card) 21'; Santelli (yellow card) 35'; Huard (red card) 72'; Chegra (yellow card) 90+6'	Stadium: Stade Marcel-Tribut; Attendance: 4,259; Referee: (France) Aurélien Petit

3 December 2024 10	Ajaccio	0–0	Bastia	Ajaccio
19:30 CET	Everson Junior (yellow card) 1'; Huard (yellow card) 20'; Youssouf (yellow card) 53'; Bamba (yellow card) 67'; Ibayi (yellow card) 78'; Puch (red card) 87'	Report	Janneh (yellow card) 80'	Stadium: Stade Michel Moretti; Referee: (France) Olivier Thual

7 December 2024 15	Ajaccio	0–2	Paris FC	Ajaccio
20:00 CET	Vidal (yellow card) 81'; Everson Junior (yellow card) 86'	Report	Marchetti 55'; Lopez (yellow card) 90+2'; Krasso 90+4'	Stadium: Stade Michel Moretti; Attendance: 2,807; Referee: (France) Jérémy Stinat

13 December 2024 16	Pau	1–0	Ajaccio	Nouste Camp
20:00 CET	Ruiz 3'	Report	Khelifa (yellow card) 27' (red card) 80'; Ibayi (yellow card) 65'	Stadium: Pau; Attendance: 2,851; Referee: (France) Faouzi Benchabane

=== Coupe de France ===
15 November 2024 Round 7	Les Herbiers	2-1	Ajaccio	Les Herbiers
19:00 CET	Shelton Guillaume 90' 90+5' (pen.)	Report	Bamba 34'	Stadium: Stade Massabielle; Attendance: 2,432; Referee: (France) Benjamin Lepaysant
