= 2023–24 Professional U18 Development League =

U18 Premier League
- Season: 2023–24
- Champions: Manchester United (1st title)
- Matches: 313
- Goals: 1,371 (4.38 per match)
- Top goalscorer: Chido Obi Arsenal (32 goals)
- Biggest home win: Chelsea 9–1 West Brom (27 December 2023); Everton 8–0 Newcastle United (18 May 2024)
- Biggest away win: Reading 0–9 Southampton (20 April 2024); Norwich City 0–9 Arsenal (27 April 2024)
- Highest scoring: Arsenal 8–3 Crystal Palace (16 March 2024)
- Longest winning run: 14 matches Manchester United (12 August 2023 – 30 January 2024)
- Longest unbeaten run: 17 matches Manchester United (12 August 2023 – 24 February 2024)
- Longest winless run: 15 matches Aston Villa (15 December 2023 – 11 May 2024)
- Longest losing run: 9 matches Norwich City (12 August 2023 – 11 November 2023)

The 2023–24 Professional U18 Development League was the 12th season of the Professional Development League system. There were 26 teams competing, divided into North and South divisions according to their region.

Reading regained Category One status in the summer.

== North ==
| Pos | Team | Pld | W | D | L | GF | GA | GD | Pts | |
|---|---|---|---|---|---|---|---|---|---|---|
| 1 | Manchester United (C) | 24 | 20 | 2 | 2 | 78 | 28 | +50 | 62 | Qualification for the National Final |
| 2 | Manchester City | 24 | 18 | 2 | 4 | 71 | 27 | +44 | 56 | |
| 3 | Wolverhampton Wanderers | 24 | 12 | 5 | 7 | 43 | 34 | +9 | 41 | |
| 4 | Derby County | 24 | 11 | 4 | 9 | 55 | 51 | +4 | 37 | |
| 5 | Leeds United | 24 | 10 | 3 | 11 | 54 | 51 | +3 | 33 | |
| 6 | Liverpool | 24 | 10 | 2 | 12 | 56 | 62 | −6 | 32 | |
| 7 | Nottingham Forest | 24 | 8 | 8 | 8 | 37 | 47 | −10 | 32 | |
| 8 | Newcastle United | 24 | 10 | 2 | 12 | 49 | 61 | −12 | 32 | |
| 9 | Middlesbrough | 24 | 7 | 6 | 11 | 33 | 47 | −14 | 27 | |
| 10 | Blackburn Rovers | 24 | 8 | 3 | 13 | 39 | 60 | −21 | 27 | |
| 11 | Everton | 24 | 7 | 4 | 13 | 39 | 39 | 0 | 25 | |
| 12 | Stoke City | 24 | 7 | 2 | 15 | 43 | 61 | −18 | 23 | |
| 13 | Sunderland | 24 | 5 | 3 | 16 | 32 | 61 | −29 | 18 | |

(C) Champions

=== Results ===
| Home \ Away | BLB | DER | EVE | LEE | LIV | MNC | MNU | MID | NEW | NFO | STK | SUN | WOL |
|---|---|---|---|---|---|---|---|---|---|---|---|---|---|
| Blackburn Rovers | — | 4–1 | 0–2 | 2–4 | 2–4 | 2–3 | 0–3 | 1–1 | 2–1 | 0–2 | 2–1 | 3–0 | 1–1 |
| Derby County | 5–2 | — | 2–0 | 1–6 | 5–1 | 0–3 | 2–2 | 4–1 | 5–3 | 1–1 | 3–1 | 5–1 | 2–3 |
| Everton | 1–3 | 1–3 | — | 0–3 | 2–2 | 0–0 | 0–2 | 0–1 | 8–0 | 1–0 | 1–2 | 3–0 | 2–3 |
| Leeds United | 4–1 | 5–0 | 1–4 | — | 4–1 | 1–4 | 0–6 | 2–4 | 1–1 | 1–2 | 1–0 | 1–0 | 1–2 |
| Liverpool | 5–1 | 2–0 | 2–1 | 1–3 | — | 1–2 | 1–9 | 3–1 | 1–2 | 4–2 | 3–1 | 7–1 | 2–4 |
| Manchester City | 6–0 | 5–1 | 1–1 | 5–2 | 3–0 | — | 4–1 | 2–1 | 4–2 | 3–4 | 3–1 | 1–3 | 3–0 |
| Manchester United | 5–2 | 3–1 | 3–1 | 4–0 | 4–3 | 1–0 | — | 3–0 | 5–1 | 2–1 | 4–2 | 1–3 | 2–0 |
| Middlesbrough | 1–2 | 2–2 | 2–0 | 1–1 | 2–2 | 0–6 | 0–4 | — | 3–4 | 1–1 | 0–2 | 0–2 | 2–0 |
| Newcastle United | 3–0 | 1–2 | 4–2 | 2–1 | 4–3 | 1–2 | 1–3 | 1–3 | — | 3–2 | 2–4 | 3–0 | 3–2 |
| Nottingham Forest | 2–1 | 0–6 | 3–2 | 2–2 | 2–1 | 1–4 | 2–2 | 1–0 | 1–4 | — | 1–1 | 0–0 | 1–1 |
| Stoke City | 3–5 | 0–1 | 1–4 | 1–6 | 2–4 | 1–3 | 1–4 | 1–1 | 4–1 | 5–3 | — | 4–2 | 1–2 |
| Sunderland | 1–2 | 1–1 | 0–2 | 4–3 | 1–2 | 1–3 | 2–3 | 2–4 | 2–2 | 1–2 | 1–2 | — | 3–1 |
| Wolverhampton Wanderers | 1–1 | 3–1 | 1–1 | 3–1 | 4–1 | 2–1 | 1–2 | 1–2 | 1–0 | 1–1 | 3–0 | 3–0 | — |

Legend: Blue = home team win; Yellow = draw; Red = away team win.

== South ==
| Pos | Team | Pld | W | D | L | GF | GA | GD | Pts | |
|---|---|---|---|---|---|---|---|---|---|---|
| 1 | Chelsea (C) | 24 | 17 | 3 | 4 | 72 | 41 | +31 | 54 | Qualification for the National Final |
| 2 | West Ham United | 24 | 16 | 1 | 7 | 72 | 48 | +24 | 49 | |
| 3 | Arsenal | 24 | 14 | 5 | 5 | 83 | 43 | +40 | 47 | |
| 4 | Tottenham Hotspur | 24 | 14 | 3 | 7 | 73 | 57 | +16 | 45 | |
| 5 | Fulham | 24 | 14 | 2 | 8 | 66 | 49 | +17 | 44 | |
| 6 | Crystal Palace | 24 | 12 | 5 | 7 | 60 | 48 | +12 | 41 | |
| 7 | Brighton & Hove Albion | 24 | 11 | 4 | 9 | 60 | 55 | +5 | 37 | |
| 8 | Leicester City | 24 | 7 | 7 | 10 | 44 | 55 | −11 | 28 | |
| 9 | West Bromwich Albion | 24 | 7 | 4 | 13 | 43 | 65 | −22 | 25 | |
| 10 | Southampton | 24 | 6 | 5 | 13 | 47 | 56 | −9 | 23 | |
| 11 | Norwich City | 24 | 6 | 1 | 17 | 41 | 81 | −40 | 19 | |
| 12 | Aston Villa | 24 | 5 | 2 | 17 | 50 | 70 | −20 | 17 | |
| 13 | Reading | 24 | 5 | 2 | 17 | 28 | 71 | −43 | 17 | |

(C) Champions

=== Results ===
| Home \ Away | ARS | AVL | BHA | CHE | CRY | FUL | LEI | NOR | REA | SOU | TOT | WBA | WHU |
|---|---|---|---|---|---|---|---|---|---|---|---|---|---|
| Arsenal | — | 4–2 | 1–3 | 5–2 | 8–3 | 5–2 | 2–1 | 4–3 | 3–0 | 4–0 | 2–2 | 2–2 | 2–0 |
| Aston Villa | 2–3 | — | 0–6 | 5–0 | 0–1 | 0–2 | 2–4 | 1–4 | 3–1 | 0–4 | 4–0 | 7–1 | 2–4 |
| Brighton & Hove Albion | 3–5 | 3–2 | — | 0–2 | 4–2 | 4–2 | 1–0 | 1–6 | 5–2 | 2–2 | 2–2 | 4–3 | 1–3 |
| Chelsea | 3–2 | 2–0 | 3–0 | — | 2–1 | 1–3 | 3–2 | 1–2 | 2–0 | 3–2 | 3–4 | 9–1 | 4–3 |
| Crystal Palace | 3–3 | 3–2 | 3–3 | 1–2 | — | 4–2 | 1–1 | 3–1 | 2–1 | 5–0 | 1–1 | 2–1 | 1–4 |
| Fulham | 1–0 | 7–2 | 3–2 | 3–3 | 4–3 | — | 4–3 | 5–0 | 2–0 | 3–2 | 1–3 | 2–3 | 3–4 |
| Leicester City | 0–4 | 3–3 | 2–2 | 2–2 | 1–1 | 1–5 | — | 1–2 | 2–1 | 2–1 | 1–4 | 4–0 | 0–3 |
| Norwich City | 0–9 | 0–7 | 2–6 | 3–6 | 1–4 | 0–0 | 1–2 | — | 2–4 | 2–3 | 2–0 | 1–4 | 1–5 |
| Reading | 2–2 | 3–2 | 3–2 | 1–4 | 0–3 | 0–3 | 2–2 | 2–1 | — | 0–9 | 1–6 | 0–1 | 1–5 |
| Southampton | 2–2 | 0–2 | 0–2 | 1–2 | 0–3 | 1–4 | 1–1 | 4–2 | 2–1 | — | 3–6 | 3–1 | 2–2 |
| Tottenham Hotspur | 3–2 | 3–2 | 4–2 | 1–4 | 2–5 | 3–4 | 3–4 | 7–2 | 3–0 | 2–2 | — | 5–3 | 2–4 |
| West Bromwich Albion | 1–1 | 2–2 | 0–1 | 2–2 | 1–2 | 2–1 | 2–5 | 0–3 | 2–3 | 3–2 | 1–2 | — | 2–0 |
| West Ham United | 1–8 | 5–2 | 3–1 | 2–3 | 5–4 | 3–0 | 5–0 | 2–0 | 3–0 | 2–1 | 2–3 | 2–5 | — |

Legend: Blue = home team win; Yellow = draw; Red = away team win.

== National Final ==
14 May 2024
19:00 UTC+1

| Chelsea | 1–2 | Manchester United |
|---|---|---|
| Acheampong 47' | Report | Wheatley 21'; Williams 54' |

Stamford Bridge, London
Referee: Luke Scott

== Season statistics ==
=== Top goalscorers ===
| Rank | Player | Club | Goals |
|---|---|---|---|
| 1 | (Denmark) Chido Obi-Martin | Arsenal | 32 |
| 2 | (England) Donnell McNeilly | Chelsea | 21 |
| 2 | (England) Matthew Warhurst | Manchester City | 21 |
| 3 | (England) Joshua Ajala | West Ham United | 17 |
| 3 | (England) Tom Olyott | Fulham | 17 |
| 4 | (England) Zach Marsh | Crystal Palace | 16 |
| 4 | (Scotland) Rory Wilson | Aston Villa | 16 |
| 5 | (England) Connor Brown | Nottingham Forest | 15 |
| 6 | (England) Mikey Moore | Tottenham Hotspur | 14 |
| 7 | (England) Dan Rigge | West Ham United | 13 |
| 7 | (Scotland) Jemiah Umolu | West Ham United | 13 |
| 8 | (Wales) Gabriele Biancheri | Manchester United | 12 |
| 8 | (England) Luke Enright | Stoke City | 12 |
| 9 | (England) Damola Ajayi | Tottenham Hotspur | 11 |
| 9 | (Germany) Coby Ebere | Everton | 11 |
| 9 | (England) Alfie Harrison | Manchester City and Newcastle United | 11 |
| 9 | (Northern Ireland) Kieran Morrison | Liverpool | 11 |
| 9 | (England) Sean Neave | Newcastle United | 11 |

=== Hat-tricks ===
| Player | For | Against | Result | Date | Ref. |
|---|---|---|---|---|---|
| (England) Lleyton Brown | Leeds United | Stoke City | 1–6 (A) | 12 August 2023 | |
| (England) Zach Marsh | Crystal Palace | Southampton | 5–0 (H) | 12 August 2023 | |
| (Scotland) Rory Wilson | Aston Villa | Tottenham Hotspur | 4–0 (H) | 12 August 2023 | |
| (Republic of Ireland) Tom Olyott | Fulham | Leicester City | 4–3 (H) | 26 August 2023 | |
| (England) Ato Ampah | Chelsea | Aston Villa | 1–5 (A) | 26 August 2023 | |
| (England) Will Merry | Southampton | Norwich City | 4–2 (H) | 16 September 2023 | |
| (England) Matthew Warhurst | Manchester City | Middlesbrough | 0–6 (A) | 16 September 2023 | |
| (Denmark) Chido Obi-Martin | Arsenal | Southampton | 4–0 (H) | 23 September 2023 | |
| (Scotland) Rory Wilson | Aston Villa | West Bromwich Albion | 7–1 (H) | 23 September 2023 | |
| (England) Zach Marsh | Crystal Palace | Fulham | 3–4 (A) | 23 September 2023 | |
| (England) Josh Robertson | Sunderland | Leeds United | 4–3 (H) | 4 October 2023 | |
| (Republic of Ireland) Trent Kone-Doherty | Liverpool | Sunderland | 7–1 (H) | 7 October 2023 | |
| (England) Mikey Moore | Tottenham Hotspur | Norwich City | 7–2 (H) | 7 October 2023 | |
| (Republic of Ireland) Tom Olyott | Fulham | Aston Villa | 7–2 (H) | 28 October 2023 | |
| (England) Zach Marsh | Crystal Palace | Tottenham Hotspur | 2–5 (A) | 4 November 2025 | |
| (Scotland) Rory Wilson | Aston Villa | Norwich City | 0–7 (A) | 4 November 2023 | |
| (England) Marley Wilson | Leeds United | Everton | 0–3 (A) | 4 November 2023 | |
| (Northern Ireland) Kieran Morrison | Liverpool | Middlesbrough | 3–1 (H) | 4 November 2023 | |
| (England) Victor Musa | Manchester United | Blackburn Rovers | 0–3 (A) | 11 November 2023 | |
| (England) Jemiah Umolu | West Ham United | Leicester City | 5–0 (H) | 2 December 2023 | |
| (England) Marley Wilson | Leeds United | Derby County | 1–6 (A) | 9 December 2023 | |
| (England) Shumaira Mheuka | Chelsea | West Bromwich Albion | 9–1 (H) | 16 December 2023 | |
| (England) Zach Marsh | Crystal Palace | West Ham United | 4–5 (A) | 6 January 2024 | |
| (England) Matthew Warhurst | Manchester City | Stoke City | 3–1 (H) | 6 January 2024 | |
| (Germany) Coby Ebere | Everton | Stoke City | 1–4 (A) | 27 January 2024 | |
| (England) Mikey Moore | Tottenham Hotspur | Southampton | 3–6 (A) | 2 February 2024 | |
| (England) Josh King | Leicester City | Tottenham Hotspur | 3–4 (A) | 10 February 2024 | |
| (Scotland) Eseosa Sule | West Bromwich Albion | West Ham United | 2–5 (A) | 17 February 2024 | |
| (England) Dan Rigge | West Ham United | Aston Villa | 2–4 (A) | 9 March 2024 | |
| (Germany) Coby Ebere | Everton | Leeds United | 1–4 (A) | 9 March 2024 | |
| (England) Bendito Mantato^{4} | Manchester United | Blackburn Rovers | 5–2 (H) | 16 March 2024 | |
| (Denmark) Chido Obi-Martin^{4} | Arsenal | Crystal Palace | 8–3 (H) | 16 March 2024 | |
| (Denmark) Chido Obi-Martin^{4} | Arsenal | Fulham | 5–2 (H) | 30 March 2024 | |
| (England) Ethan Wheatley | Manchester United | Liverpool | 1–9 (A) | 6 April 2024 | |
| (Denmark) Chido Obi-Martin^{5} | Arsenal | West Ham United | 1–8 (A) | 13 April 2024 | |
| (Republic of Ireland) Niall McAndrew | Derby County | Sunderland | 6–1 (H) | 13 April 2024 | |
| (England) Brook Myers | Southampton | Reading | 0–9 (A) | 20 April 2024 | |
| (England) Samuel Amo-Ameyaw | Southampton | Reading | 0–9 (A) | 20 April 2024 | |
| (Denmark) Chido Obi-Martin^{7} | Arsenal | Norwich City | 0–9 (A) | 27 April 2024 | |
| (England) Matthew Warhurst | Manchester City | Leeds United | 1–4 (A) | 27 April 2024 | |
| (England) Damola Ajayi | Tottenham Hotspur | West Bromwich Albion | 5–3 (H) | 27 April 2024 | |
| (Republic of Ireland) Tom Olyott | Fulham | Leicester City | 1–5 (A) | 1 May 2024 | |
| (England) Charlie Lennon | Middlesbrough | Sunderland | 2–4 (A) | 5 May 2024 | |
| (England) Joshua Ajala | West Ham United | Crystal Palace | 1–4 (A) | 7 May 2024 | |
| (Denmark) Chido Obi-Martin | Arsenal | Chelsea | 5–2 (H) | 11 May 2024 | |
| (England) Sahil Bashir | Brighton & Hove Albion | Norwich City | 2–6 (A) | 11 May 2024 | |
| (England) Justin Oguntolu | Derby County | Liverpool | 5–1 (H) | 11 May 2024 | |
| (England) Matthew Warhurst | Manchester City | Blackburn Rovers | 2–3 (A) | 14 May 2024 | |

Note

(H) – Home; (A) – Away
^{4} – player scored 4 goals ^{5} – player scored 5 goals ^{7} – player scored 7 goals

== Professional Development League 2 ==
U18 Professional Development League 2
- Season: 2023–24
- Champions: Birmingham City (1st Title)
- Matches: 313 (310 RS, 3 PO)
- Goals: 1,307 (4.18 per match) (1,294 RS, 13 PO)
- Top goalscorer: (England) Micah Mbick Charlton Athletic (27 Goals)
- Biggest home win: Millwall 12–0 Queens Park Rangers (9 March 2024) League Record
- Biggest away win: Colchester United 1–10 Millwall (13 January 2024)
- Highest scoring: Millwall 12–0 Queens Park Rangers (9 March 2024); Millwall 8–4 Cardiff City (1 May 2024)
- Longest winning run: 8 matches – Birmingham City (8 February 2024 – 28 March 2024); Cardiff City (30 September 2023 – 20 January 2024)
- Longest unbeaten run: 13 matches – Charlton Athletic (19 March 2024–18 May 2024)
- Longest winless run: 18 matches – Colchester United (30 September 2023–26 March 2024)
- Longest losing run: 8 matches – Fleetwood Town (30 September 2023 – 3 February 2024); Peterborough United (20 February 2024 – 13 April 2024)

The 2023–24 season was the 12th edition of the Professional Development League 2, an under-18 football's second tier, designed for those academies with Category 2 status. The league was split regionally into North and South divisions, with each team facing opponents in their own region twice both home and away, and opponents in the other region once, resulting in 30 games played for the North Division, while the South Division played 29 games. The sides finishing in the top two positions in both regions at the end of the season progressed to a knockout stage to determine the overall league champion. Barnsley were the defending national champions while AFC Bournemouth and Fleetwood Town joined the division for the 2023–24 season.

=== Tables ===
==== North Division ====
| Pos | Team | Pld | W | D | L | GF | GA | GD | Pts | Qualification |
|---|---|---|---|---|---|---|---|---|---|---|
| 1 | Birmingham City | 30 | 21 | 4 | 5 | 73 | 37 | +36 | 67 | Qualification for Knock-out stage |
| 2 | Barnsley | 30 | 18 | 3 | 9 | 71 | 43 | +28 | 57 | Qualification for Knock-out stage |
| 3 | Sheffield Wednesday | 30 | 16 | 4 | 10 | 56 | 36 | +20 | 52 | |
| 4 | Burnley | 30 | 12 | 10 | 8 | 56 | 38 | +18 | 46 | |
| 5 | Sheffield United | 30 | 11 | 9 | 10 | 57 | 48 | +9 | 42 | |
| 6 | Crewe Alexandra | 30 | 12 | 3 | 15 | 71 | 73 | −2 | 39 | |
| 7 | Fleetwood Town | 30 | 12 | 2 | 16 | 46 | 65 | −19 | 38 | |
| 8 | Hull City | 30 | 10 | 6 | 14 | 47 | 70 | −23 | 36 | |
| 9 | Coventry City | 30 | 9 | 5 | 16 | 51 | 75 | −24 | 32 | |
| 10 | Wigan Athletic | 30 | 8 | 4 | 18 | 49 | 67 | −18 | 28 | |
| 11 | Peterborough United | 30 | 6 | 2 | 22 | 44 | 87 | −43 | 20 | |

==== South Division ====
| Pos | Team | Pld | W | D | L | GF | GA | GD | Pts | Qualification |
|---|---|---|---|---|---|---|---|---|---|---|
| 1 | Charlton Athletic | 29 | 21 | 5 | 3 | 94 | 51 | +43 | 68 | Qualification for Knock-out stage |
| 2 | Bristol City | 29 | 20 | 2 | 7 | 75 | 35 | +40 | 62 | Qualification for Knock-out stage |
| 3 | Cardiff City | 29 | 18 | 3 | 8 | 76 | 51 | +25 | 57 | |
| 4 | Watford | 29 | 15 | 5 | 9 | 60 | 36 | +24 | 50 | |
| 5 | AFC Bournemouth | 29 | 13 | 0 | 16 | 65 | 71 | −6 | 39 | |
| 6 | Millwall | 29 | 12 | 2 | 15 | 86 | 67 | +19 | 38 | |
| 7 | Ipswich Town | 29 | 11 | 3 | 15 | 67 | 77 | −10 | 36 | |
| 8 | Swansea City | 29 | 11 | 1 | 17 | 49 | 63 | −14 | 34 | |
| 9 | Queens Park Rangers | 29 | 8 | 2 | 19 | 54 | 111 | −57 | 26 | |
| 10 | Colchester United | 29 | 5 | 7 | 17 | 47 | 93 | −46 | 22 | |

=== Knock-out stage ===
Semi-finals

18 May 2024

| Charlton Athletic | 5–3 | Barnsley |
|---|---|---|
| Mbick 2'; Wales 31'; Casey 45', 62'; Hunter 76' | Report | Jalo 26', 48'; Alker 38' |

Sparrows Lane, London
18 May 2024

| Birmingham City | 0–0 (a.e.t.) | Bristol City |
Penalties
| Tattum (penalty scored); Ahmed (penalty missed); Sanders (penalty scored); Burrell (penalty scored); Bateman (penalty scored); Ruiz Rente (penalty missed); Da Silva (penalty scored); Dodd (penalty scored) | 6–5 | (penalty missed) Hewlett; (penalty scored) Meerholz; (penalty scored) Ap-Sion; (penalty scored) Yeboah; (penalty scored) James; (penalty missed) Phillips; (penalty scored) Bak; (penalty missed) Morrison |

St. Andrew's, Birmingham

Professional Development League Two Play-Off Final

25 May 2024

| Birmingham City | 3–2 (a.e.t.) | Charlton Athletic |
|---|---|---|
| Tattum 31'; Sanders 77'; Isichei 95' | | Rylah 73'; Mbick 82' (pen.) |

Birmingham County FA, Birmingham

=== Top goalscorers ===
As of 25 May 2024

| Rank | Player | Club | Goals |
|---|---|---|---|
| 1 | (England) Micah Mbick | Charlton Athletic | 27 |
| 2 | (England) Kavalli Heywood | Millwall | 22 |
| 3 | (England) Frank Tattum | Birmingham City | 19 |
| 3 | (Wales) Tom Woodward | Swansea City | 19 |
| 5 | (England) Emmaisa Nzondo | Barnsley | 17 |
| 6 | (England) Jonny Day | AFC Bournemouth | 16 |
| 7 | (England) Luke Alker | Barnsley | 15 |
| 7 | (England) Jack Howland | Millwall | 15 |
| 9 | (Wales) Trey George | Cardiff City | 12 |
| 9 | (Northern Ireland) Devlan Moses | Sheffield Wednesday | 12 |
| 9 | (England) Tyler Winters | Peterborough United | 12 |
| 9 | (England) Ben Wodskou | Birmingham City | 12 |
| 13 | (England) Jonathan Lawson | Watford | 11 |
| 14 | (Republic of Ireland) Patrick Casey | Charlton Athletic | 10 |
| 14 | (England) Lucas Dawson | Hull City | 10 |
| 14 | (England) Jonny Stuttle | AFC Bournemouth | 10 |

=== Hat-tricks ===
As of 25 May 2024

| Player | For | Against | Result | Date | Ref. |
|---|---|---|---|---|---|
| (England) Jonny Day | AFC Bournemouth | Wigan Athletic | 5–0 (H) | 12 August 2023 | |
| (England) Emmaisa Nzondo | Barnsley | Colchester United | 6–2 (H) | 18 August 2023 | |
| (England) Frank Tattum | Birmingham City | Ipswich Town | 6–2 (H) | 19 August 2023 | |
| (England) Amin Nabizada | Watford | Peterborough United | 0–6 (A) | 9 September 2023 | |
| (England) Mikey Lane | Fleetwood Town | Queens Park Rangers | 9–0 (H) | 9 September 2023 | |
| (England) Jonathan Lawson | Watford | Crewe Alexandra | 5–2 (H) | 16 September 2023 | |
| (England) Oli Davis | Ipswich Town | Queens Park Rangers | 7–0 (H) | 30 September 2023 | |
| (Republic of Ireland) Patrick Casey^{4} | Charlton Athletic | Swansea City | 3–6 (A) | 30 September 2023 | |
| (United States) Aidan Dausch^{4} | Coventry City | Hull City | 8–1 (H) | 14 October 2023 | |
| (England) Emmaisa Nzondo | Barnsley | Crewe Alexandra | 4–1 (H) | 28 October 2023 | |
| (Wales) Trey George | Cardiff City | Swansea City | 3–2 (H) | 4 November 2023 | |
| (England) Luke Alker^{4} | Barnsley | Peterborough United | 8–0 (H) | 6 January 2024 | |
| (Scotland) Ryan Oné | Sheffield United | Coventry City | 0–3 (A) | 6 January 2024 | |
| (Wales) Tom Woodward | Swansea City | Ipswich Town | 4–2 (H) | 6 January 2024 | |
| (England) Kavalli Heywood | Millwall | Colchester United | 1–10 (A) | 13 January 2024 | |
| (Albania) Elidon O'Boyle | Millwall | Colchester United | 1–10 (A) | 13 January 2024 | |
| (Northern Ireland) Devlan Moses | Sheffield Wednesday | Birmingham City | 2–3 (A) | 20 January 2024 | |
| (England) Vernon Masara | Burnley | Coventry City | 4–0 (H) | 27 January 2024 | |
| (England) Jack Howland | Millwall | Swansea City | 5–1 (H) | 10 February 2024 | |
| (England) Luke Alker | Barnsley | Coventry City | 4–2 (H) | 17 February 2024 | |
| (England) Kavalli Heywood^{4} | Millwall | Bristol City | 4–1 (H) | 17 February 2024 | |
| (England) Tyler Winters | Peterborough United | Wigan Athletic | 4–2 (H) | 17 February 2024 | |
| (England) Jack Howland^{4} | Millwall | Queens Park Rangers | 12–0 (H) | 9 March 2024 | |
| (England) Micah Mbick | Charlton Athletic | Millwall | 0–4 (A) | 19 March 2024 | |
| (England) Micah Mbick | Charlton Athletic | Peterborough United | 7–3 (H) | 23 March 2024 | |
| (England) Ben Wodskou | Birmingham City | Queens Park Rangers | 2–8 (A) | 13 April 2024 | |
| (England) Micah Mbick | Charlton Athletic | Ipswich Town | 6–2 (H) | 30 April 2024 | |
| (Wales) Mannie Barton^{4} | Cardiff City | Millwall | 4–8 (A) | 1 May 2024 | |

Note

(H) – Home; (A) – Away
^{4} – player scored 4 goals

== EFL Youth Alliance ==
Football League Youth Alliance
- Season: 2023-24
- Champions: North-East Division; Mansfield Town; North-West Division; Preston North End; South-East Division; Luton Town; South-West Division; Plymouth Argyle; Merit League One; Plymouth Argyle; Merit League Two; Brentford; North-East Division Championship Group Round; Mansfield Town; North-East Division Lower Table Round; Grimsby Town
- Matches: 581
- Goals: 2,247 (3.87 per match)

The Football League Youth Alliance sometimes known as League 3 is run by the English Football League under the auspices of the EFL Youth Alliance. 45 teams were scheduled to competed this season, however one team was expelled before the season began. Notts County returned to the league after a 3-season absence, while Wrexham returned to the league after a four-season absence because both teams clubs were promoted back to the Football League. AFC Bournemouth and Fleetwood Town both left because their academies were promoted to Category 2 and as a result both teams joined the U18 Professional Development League 2. Because their parent club was relegated from the National League in their first season, Scunthorpe United were expelled from the league because there was no way their parent club could not promote back to the football league in time. Meanwhile Southend United did not participate because their parent club lost their EPPP license. For clubs that get relegated to the National League, they have two years to gain promotion back to the EFL. Otherwise, they lose their license with the League.

=== League stage ===
As of match played 4 May 2024

==== North-East Division ====
| Pos | Team | Pld | W | D | L | GF | GA | GD | Pts | Qualification |
|---|---|---|---|---|---|---|---|---|---|---|
| 1 | Mansfield Town (C) | 20 | 12 | 3 | 5 | 48 | 23 | +25 | 39 | Northeast Division Championship Round |
| 2 | Burton Albion | 20 | 11 | 1 | 8 | 38 | 34 | +4 | 34 | Northeast Division Championship Round |
| 3 | Rotherham United | 20 | 10 | 3 | 7 | 51 | 44 | +7 | 33 | Northeast Division Championship Round |
| 4 | Lincoln City | 20 | 10 | 2 | 8 | 51 | 33 | +18 | 32 | Northeast Division Championship Round |
| 5 | Bradford City | 20 | 10 | 2 | 8 | 38 | 33 | +5 | 32 | Northeast Division Championship Round |
| 6 | Hartlepool United | 20 | 10 | 2 | 8 | 41 | 39 | +2 | 32 | Northeast Division Championship Round |
| 7 | Grimsby Town | 20 | 8 | 6 | 6 | 42 | 27 | +15 | 30 | Northeast Division Lower Round |
| 8 | Harrogate Town | 20 | 8 | 4 | 8 | 30 | 32 | −2 | 28 | Northeast Division Lower Round |
| 9 | Doncaster Rovers | 20 | 7 | 3 | 10 | 30 | 33 | −3 | 24 | Northeast Division Lower Round |
| 10 | Huddersfield Town | 20 | 3 | 7 | 10 | 27 | 65 | −38 | 16 | Northeast Division Lower Round |
| 11 | Notts County | 20 | 4 | 1 | 15 | 26 | 59 | −33 | 13 | Northeast Division Lower Round |
| 12 | Scunthorpe United | 0 | 0 | 0 | 0 | 0 | 0 | 0 | 0 | |

Source: soccerway.com
(C) Champions

==== North-West Division ====
| Pos | Team | Pld | W | D | L | GF | GA | GD | Pts |
|---|---|---|---|---|---|---|---|---|---|
| 1 | Preston North End (C) | 26 | 18 | 2 | 6 | 75 | 49 | +26 | 56 |
| 2 | Wrexham | 26 | 18 | 1 | 7 | 78 | 41 | +37 | 55 |
| 3 | Bolton Wanderers | 26 | 17 | 3 | 6 | 70 | 37 | +33 | 54 |
| 4 | Morecambe | 26 | 17 | 3 | 6 | 58 | 39 | +19 | 54 |
| 5 | Accrington Stanley | 26 | 17 | 1 | 8 | 76 | 60 | +16 | 52 |
| 6 | Blackpool | 26 | 14 | 2 | 10 | 53 | 48 | +5 | 44 |
| 7 | Shrewsbury Town | 26 | 11 | 2 | 13 | 44 | 51 | −7 | 35 |
| 8 | Salford City | 26 | 9 | 4 | 13 | 50 | 57 | −7 | 31 |
| 9 | Stockport County | 26 | 10 | 1 | 15 | 35 | 45 | −10 | 31 |
| 10 | Rochdale | 26 | 9 | 3 | 14 | 50 | 56 | −6 | 30 |
| 11 | Oldham Athletic | 26 | 9 | 3 | 14 | 35 | 46 | −11 | 30 |
| 12 | Carlisle United | 26 | 8 | 3 | 15 | 42 | 65 | −23 | 27 |
| 13 | Port Vale | 26 | 5 | 3 | 18 | 44 | 75 | −31 | 18 |
| 14 | Walsall | 26 | 3 | 3 | 20 | 27 | 68 | −41 | 12 |

Source: soccerway.com
(C) Champions

==== South-East Division ====
| Pos | Team | Pld | W | D | L | GF | GA | GD | Pts | Qualification |
|---|---|---|---|---|---|---|---|---|---|---|
| 1 | Luton Town (C) | 18 | 12 | 2 | 4 | 41 | 17 | +24 | 38 | Merit League One |
| 2 | AFC Wimbledon | 18 | 11 | 2 | 5 | 39 | 28 | +11 | 35 | Merit League One |
| 3 | Stevenage | 18 | 10 | 4 | 4 | 33 | 19 | +14 | 34 | Merit League One |
| 4 | Sutton United | 18 | 9 | 4 | 5 | 31 | 27 | +4 | 31 | Merit League One |
| 5 | Leyton Orient | 18 | 8 | 4 | 6 | 40 | 32 | +8 | 28 | Merit League One |
| 6 | Northampton Town | 18 | 7 | 3 | 8 | 25 | 26 | −1 | 24 | Merit League Two |
| 7 | Cambridge United | 18 | 7 | 2 | 9 | 38 | 40 | −2 | 23 | Merit League Two |
| 8 | Brentford | 18 | 4 | 3 | 11 | 35 | 48 | −13 | 15 | Merit League Two |
| 9 | Gillingham | 18 | 3 | 5 | 10 | 33 | 43 | −10 | 14 | Merit League Two |
| 10 | Milton Keynes Dons | 18 | 3 | 3 | 12 | 21 | 56 | −35 | 12 | Merit League Two |

Source: soccerway.com
(C) Champions

==== South-West Division ====
| Pos | Team | Pld | W | D | L | GF | GA | GD | Pts | Qualification |
|---|---|---|---|---|---|---|---|---|---|---|
| 1 | Plymouth Argyle (C) | 16 | 11 | 3 | 2 | 44 | 21 | +23 | 36 | Merit League One |
| 2 | Swindon Town | 16 | 11 | 1 | 4 | 42 | 20 | +22 | 34 | Merit League One |
| 3 | Portsmouth | 16 | 7 | 2 | 7 | 38 | 27 | +11 | 23 | Merit League One |
| 4 | Cheltenham Town | 16 | 7 | 2 | 7 | 25 | 31 | −6 | 23 | Merit League One |
| 5 | Oxford United | 16 | 6 | 3 | 7 | 23 | 26 | −3 | 21 | Merit League One |
| 6 | Exeter City | 16 | 5 | 5 | 6 | 32 | 39 | −7 | 20 | Merit League Two |
| 7 | Forest Green Rovers | 16 | 6 | 1 | 9 | 34 | 41 | −7 | 19 | Merit League Two |
| 8 | Bristol Rovers | 16 | 5 | 3 | 8 | 25 | 33 | −8 | 18 | Merit League Two |
| 9 | Newport County | 16 | 3 | 2 | 11 | 28 | 53 | −25 | 11 | Merit League Two |

Source: soccerway.com
(C) Champions

=== Merit League Stage ===
The teams in the Southeast and Southwest Divisions played another ten games to determine the champions of Merit League One and Merit League Two.

==== Merit League One ====
| Pos | Team | Pld | W | D | L | GF | GA | GD | Pts |
|---|---|---|---|---|---|---|---|---|---|
| 1 | Plymouth Argyle (C) | 9 | 7 | 1 | 1 | 24 | 13 | +11 | 22 |
| 2 | Leyton Orient | 9 | 4 | 4 | 1 | 26 | 16 | +10 | 16 |
| 3 | Stevenage | 9 | 4 | 2 | 3 | 22 | 12 | +10 | 14 |
| 4 | Portsmouth | 9 | 4 | 2 | 3 | 16 | 17 | −1 | 14 |
| 5 | Luton Town | 8 | 4 | 0 | 4 | 17 | 18 | −1 | 12 |
| 6 | Swindon Town | 9 | 3 | 2 | 4 | 20 | 23 | −3 | 11 |
| 7 | Oxford United | 9 | 3 | 2 | 4 | 16 | 21 | −5 | 11 |
| 8 | AFC Wimbledon | 9 | 3 | 1 | 5 | 16 | 20 | −4 | 10 |
| 9 | Cheltenham Town | 8 | 2 | 3 | 3 | 17 | 25 | −8 | 9 |
| 10 | Sutton United | 9 | 1 | 1 | 7 | 8 | 17 | −9 | 4 |

Source: soccerway.com
(C) Champions

==== Merit League Two ====
| Pos | Team | Pld | W | D | L | GF | GA | GD | Pts |
|---|---|---|---|---|---|---|---|---|---|
| 1 | Brentford (C) | 8 | 6 | 0 | 2 | 21 | 9 | +12 | 18 |
| 2 | Gillingham | 8 | 6 | 0 | 2 | 21 | 10 | +11 | 18 |
| 3 | Cambridge United | 8 | 5 | 0 | 3 | 19 | 18 | +1 | 15 |
| 4 | Bristol Rovers | 8 | 4 | 2 | 2 | 23 | 19 | +4 | 14 |
| 5 | Northampton Town | 8 | 4 | 0 | 4 | 24 | 14 | +10 | 12 |
| 6 | Forest Green Rovers | 8 | 3 | 2 | 3 | 16 | 18 | −2 | 11 |
| 7 | Milton Keynes Dons | 8 | 2 | 1 | 5 | 18 | 23 | −5 | 7 |
| 8 | Newport County | 8 | 2 | 1 | 5 | 21 | 33 | −12 | 7 |
| 9 | Exeter City | 8 | 1 | 0 | 7 | 14 | 33 | −19 | 3 |

Source: soccerway.com
(C) Champions

=== Northeast Division 2nd Phase ===
Only 4 or 5 games were played but they were added in the regular season averages.

==== North-East Merit Championship Group ====
These games include the regular season matches.

| Pos | Team | Pld | W | D | L | GF | GA | GD | Pts |
|---|---|---|---|---|---|---|---|---|---|
| 1 | Mansfield Town (C) | 25 | 17 | 3 | 5 | 62 | 27 | +35 | 54 |
| 2 | Burton Albion | 25 | 15 | 1 | 9 | 56 | 38 | +18 | 46 |
| 3 | Rotherham United | 25 | 11 | 4 | 10 | 59 | 57 | +2 | 37 |
| 4 | Bradford City | 25 | 11 | 4 | 10 | 48 | 47 | +1 | 37 |
| 5 | Hartlepool United | 25 | 11 | 4 | 10 | 54 | 56 | −2 | 37 |
| 6 | Lincoln City | 25 | 10 | 3 | 12 | 61 | 54 | +7 | 33 |

Source: soccerway.com
(C) Champions

==== North-East Merit Lower Table Round ====
| Pos | Team | Pld | W | D | L | GF | GA | GD | Pts |
|---|---|---|---|---|---|---|---|---|---|
| 1 | Grimsby Town (C) | 24 | 11 | 7 | 6 | 52 | 29 | +23 | 40 |
| 2 | Harrogate Town | 24 | 10 | 5 | 9 | 36 | 39 | −3 | 35 |
| 3 | Doncaster Rovers | 24 | 8 | 6 | 10 | 36 | 38 | −2 | 30 |
| 4 | Notts County | 24 | 5 | 2 | 17 | 32 | 65 | −33 | 17 |
| 5 | Huddersfield Town | 24 | 3 | 7 | 14 | 28 | 74 | −46 | 16 |

Source: soccerway.com
(C) Champions

== See also ==
- 2023–24 in English football
