= Arley Kay =

English footballer (born 2008)

Personal information
- Full name: Arley Wayne Kay
- Date of birth: 16 February 2008 (age 18)
- Place of birth: Barnsley, South Yorkshire, England
- Position: Full-back

Team information
- Current team: Barnsley
- Number: 2

Youth career
- Everton
- 2015–2017: Tranmere Rovers
- 2017–2019: Bury
- 2019–2022: Crewe Alexandra
- 2024–2026: Barnsley

Senior career*
Years	Team	Apps	(Gls)
2026–	Barnsley	11	(0)
- * Club domestic league appearances and goals as of 16:17, 24 October 2026 (UTC)

Arley Wayne Kay (born 16 February 2008) is an English professional footballer who plays as a full-back for EFL League One club Barnsley. He is the son of former professional footballer Antony Kay.

A product of Barnsley's Academy, Kay signed his first professional contract in June 2026 after being named the club's Academy Player of the Season for 2025–26. He made his professional debut in August 2026 and became a regular in the first team during the opening weeks of the 2026–27 season. In August 2026, he was named Barnsley's Player of the Month.

== Career ==
=== Early career ===
Kay began playing football with Everton's development programme at the age of five. He later joined Tranmere Rovers, progressing from under-8 to under-9 level before the club's youth setup was closed. He then spent two years with Bury, before its academy was also closed. Kay subsequently joined Crewe Alexandra, where he progressed from under-12 to under-14 level, playing as a central midfielder. His father, Antony, said Crewe were likely to release him, and that he withdrew Kay from the club because he felt Kay had not yet developed sufficiently at that stage.

He then spent two years playing grassroots football in Liverpool, which his father said helped toughen him up physically. During his under-15 season, he spent four months on trial with Wigan Athletic, but was not offered a place. Halfway through his under-16 season, Kay joined Barnsley on trial and was offered a scholarship. He progressed through the club's youth ranks, becoming captain of the under-18 side and making appearances for the under-21s.

=== Barnsley ===
“From the first day he has improved every day in training. I trust him a lot. [...] He is a player who will surprise a lot in the season.”

— Daniel Stendel, discussing Kay's pre-season progress following his first professional contract, 4 August 2026

Having completed his scholarship, Kay was retained by Barnsley at the end of the 2025–26 season and offered professional terms. He subsequently signed his first professional contract with the club in June 2026, agreeing to a one-year deal with an option for a second season. During pre-season, Kay initially featured primarily at left-back before moving into central defence for the final friendly against Lincoln City. His performances in both positions impressed manager Daniel Stendel, who praised his progress and versatility.

Barnsley academy coach Bobby Hassell said Kay joined the academy as a central midfielder before being moved to centre-back due to competition for places in midfield. Hassell said Kay initially struggled physically but, ahead of the 2026–27 season, worked with a sports scientist and in the gym to improve his physical development. He praised Kay's decision-making, consistency and attitude, saying he had performed well at centre-back, right-back and left-back. Hassell believed Kay would ultimately play at centre-back and compared him with John Stones in terms of quality, consistency and mindset.

He made his professional debut on 8 August 2026, starting at right-back for Barnsley in their EFL Cup first-round match against Wigan Athletic. After the interval, he moved to left-back, having started the match on the opposite flank. The occasion carried added significance as he followed his father, Antony Kay, in making his professional debut for Barnsley. A regular presence in League One soon followed, with Kay starting the club's opening seven fixtures, while his adaptability was further demonstrated by a deployment in central defence during the EFL Cup second-round victory over Crewe Alexandra.

His performances in August earned him Barnsley's Player of the Month award. He also provided an attacking threat from defence, going close twice against Bromley with efforts from outside the penalty area, one of which was saved and another striking the crossbar. On 15 September, he recorded his first assist for the first team when he set up Reyes Cleary for Barnsley's second goal in a 3–3 draw against Peterborough United in the EFL Cup. He also converted his penalty in the subsequent shoot-out, which Barnsley lost 7–6. Four days later, he assisted Cleary again for Barnsley's equaliser in a 1–1 draw with Leicester City.

== Personal life ==
Kay is the son of former professional footballer Antony Kay. His mother, Louise, is a hair and makeup artist. Kay's parents married in Mauritius in 2013, with Kay attending the wedding alongside his sisters Ella and Libby. His three sisters, mother Louise, and extended family, including his aunts and uncles, regularly attend his matches to support him. Away from football, Kay enjoys golf and padel.

In 2026, he completed a Level 3 BTEC, Sporting Excellence Professional qualification at Distinction level and UEFA C coaching qualification as part of Barnsley's 2024–26 scholarship cohort.

== Career statistics ==
As of match played on 24 October 2026

Appearances and goals by club, season and competition
Club	Season	League			National cup		League cup		Other		Total	
Club	Season	Division	Apps	Goals	Apps	Goals	Apps	Goals	Apps	Goals	Apps	Goals
Barnsley	2026–27	League One	11	0	0	0	3	0	1 (Note: One appearance in EFL Trophy)	0	15	0
Career total			11	0	0	0	3	0	1	0	15	0

== Honours ==
Individual

- Barnsley Academy Player of the Season: 2025–26
- Barnsley Player of the Month: August 2026
