= 2026–27 Barnsley F.C. season =

140th season in existence of Barnsley FC

Barnsley
2026–27 season
- Owner: BFC Investment Company Ltd
- Chairman: Neerav Parekh
- Head coach: Daniel Stendel
- Stadium: Oakwell
- EFL Cup: Third round

The 2026–27 season is the 140th season in the history of Barnsley Football Club and their fifth consecutive season in League One. In addition to the domestic league, the club would also participate in the FA Cup, the EFL Cup, and the EFL Trophy.

== Managerial changes ==
Prior to the season starting, Daniel Stendel was announced as the new head coach, rejoining the club on a two-year deal.

On 15 August 2026, Cameron McGeehan named as Barnsley's first team captain.

== Transfers and contracts ==
=== In ===
Date	Pos.	Player	From	Fee	Ref.
30 June 2026	CB	(England) Calum Hudson	(England) Scarborough Athletic	Undisclosed	
1 July 2026 (Note: The transfer was announced on 29 June, and would become official on July 1 once McGeehan's contract at Northampton Town expired.)	CM	(Northern Ireland) Cameron McGeehan	(England) Northampton Town	Free	
2 July 2026	CB	(England) Isaac Smith	(England) Manchester City	Undisclosed	
2 July 2026	LW	(Australia) Clayton Taylor	(Australia) Newcastle Jets	Free	
14 July 2026	RWB	(Curaçao) Tyrese Noslin	(Netherlands) Telstar	£255,000	
15 July 2026	CF	(England) Amani Richards	(England) Leicester City	Undisclosed	
29 July 2026	CM	(England) Franklin Middleton	(England) Doncaster Rovers	Free	
31 July 2026	CB	(England) Sam Gale	(England) Gillingham	Undisclosed	
7 August 2026	CF	(England) O'Rian Reid	(England) Hartpury	Undisclosed	
30 August 2026	CF	(Ivory Coast) Ben Hamed Touré	(France) Annecy	Undisclosed	
15 September 2026	CB	(Malawi) Jubril Okedina	(Republic of Ireland) Bohemian	Free	
22 September 2026	CF	(Australia) Rylan Brownlie	(England) Crystal Palace	Free	
9 October 2026	CM	(Jamaica) Daniel Johnson	(Turkey) Fatih Karagümrük	Free	
15 October 2026	CF	(England) Tobi Adeyemo	(England) Watford	Free	

=== Out ===
Date	Pos.	Player	To	Fee	Ref.
19 June 2026	CAM	(England) Adam Phillips	(England) Bradford City	Undisclosed	
19 June 2026	GK	(England) Jackson Smith	(England) Port Vale	Undisclosed	
18 August 2026	CB	(France) Maël de Gevigney	(Denmark) Silkeborg	Undisclosed	
25 August 2026	CB	(Poland) Kacper Łopata	(Poland) Lechia Gdańsk	Undisclosed	
26 August 2026	CB	(England) Josh Earl	(England) Blackpool	Undisclosed	
1 September 2026	RB	(Republic of Ireland) Corey O'Keeffe	(England) Bradford City	Undisclosed	

=== Loaned in ===
Date	Pos.	Player	From	Loaned until	Ref.
13 July 2026	GK	(Scotland) Cieran Slicker	(England) Ipswich Town	End of Season	
16 July 2026	CF	(Northern Ireland) Makenzie Kirk	(England) Portsmouth	End of Season	
27 August 2026	CB	(Republic of Ireland) Connor O'Riordan	(England) Blackburn Rovers	End of Season (Note: Option to make the move permanent)	
29 August 2026	LB	(France) Ziyad Larkeche	(England) Queens Park Rangers	End of Season	

=== Loaned out ===
Date	Pos.	Player	To	Loaned until	Ref.
5 August 2026	LW	(England) Charlie Lennon	(England) Yeovil Town	3 January 2027	
7 September 2026	LB	(England) Georgie Gent	(England) Boston United	1 December 2026 (Note: On 7 October, Gent's initial one-month loan at Boston United was extended until December.)	
9 October 2026	CF	(England) Leo Farrell	(England) Altrincham	1 January 2027	
6 November 2026	RB	(England) Toure Bell	(England) Worsbrough Bridge Athletic	4 December 2026	
6 November 2026	CM	(England) Franklin Middleton	(England) Grimsby Borough	4 December 2026	
6 November 2026	CB	(England) Calum Hudson	(England) Bury	4 December 2026	

=== Released / Out of Contract ===
Date	Pos.	Player	Subsequent club	Joined date	Ref.
30 June 2026	CF	(Scotland) Andrew Dallas	(England) Walsall	1 July 2026	
30 June 2026	CB	(Republic of Ireland) Eoghan O'Connell	(England) Stockport County	1 July 2026	
30 June 2026	CM	(Jamaica) Jon Russell	(England) Mansfield Town	1 July 2026	
30 June 2026	GK	(England) Aston Wilson	(England) Oldham Athletic	1 July 2026	
30 June 2026	CF	(England) Max Watters	(England) Port Vale	16 July 2026	
30 June 2026	RB	(Thailand) Kingston Simbai	(Thailand) Nakhon Si United	22 July 2026	
30 June 2026	LW	(Malta) Aston Ellard			
30 June 2026	CM	(Poland) Maxymilian Gryncewicz			
30 June 2026	CM	(England) Stan Holder			
30 June 2026	CB	(England) Ben Jordison			
30 June 2026	CM	(England) Voldi Mbaya			
30 June 2026	CB	(England) Marc Roberts			
30 June 2026	CB	(England) Tom Senior			
30 June 2026	RB	(England) Tennai Watson			
27 August 2026	CM	(Nigeria) Kelechi Nwakali			

David McGoldrick - Mansfield Town

=== New Contract ===
Date	Pos.	Player	Contract expiry	Ref.
17 May 2026	CF	(England) Luke Alker	30 June 2027	
17 May 2026	CB	(France) Maël de Gevigney	30 June 2027	
17 May 2026	CF	(England) Lewis Gould	30 June 2027	
17 May 2026	CM	(England) Kieran Graham	30 June 2027	
17 May 2026	CAM	(England) Adam Phillips	30 June 2027	
17 May 2026	CB	(England) Jack Shepherd	30 June 2027	
29 September 2026	CM	(England) Nathan Willis	Undisclosed	

== Pre-season and friendlies ==
On 8 June, Barnsley announced three pre-season friendlies against York City, Scarborough Athletic and Lincoln City. On 23 June, a trip to Matlock Town was confirmed.

Win Draw Loss Fixtures

4 July 2026 Friendly	Matlock Town	0–2	Barnsley	Matlock
15:00 BST		Report	Cleary 7'; Farrell 17'	Stadium: Proctor Cars Stadium

11 July 2026 Friendly	York City	2–1	Barnsley	Huntington
15:00 BST	Olley 20'; Pearce 80'	Report	McGeehan 37'	Stadium: LNER Community Stadium

25 July 2026 Friendly	Scarborough Athletic	0–2	Barnsley	Scarborough
13:00 BST		Report	Farrell 1'; Town 57'	Stadium: Scarborough Sports Village

1 August 2026 Friendly	Barnsley	3–0	Lincoln City	Barnsley
19:00 BST	Kelly 3'; Kirk 45+3'; Earl (red card) 74'; Cleary 88'	Report		Stadium: Oakwell

== Competitions ==
=== League One ===
==== League table ====
Pos	Team	Pld	W	D	L	GF	GA	GD	Pts	Promotion, qualification or relegation
20	Blackpool	13	3	3	7	17	22	−5	12	
21	Doncaster Rovers	13	3	3	7	14	22	−8	12	Relegation to EFL League Two
22	Peterborough United	13	2	4	7	11	23	−12	10	Relegation to EFL League Two
23	Barnsley	14	2	3	9	14	26	−12	9	Relegation to EFL League Two
24	Bromley	13	2	3	8	13	33	−20	9	Relegation to EFL League Two

Updated to match(es) played on 20 November 2026. Source: EFL Official Website
Rules for classification: 1) Points; 2) Goal difference; 3) Number of goals scored; 4) Head-to-head results; 5) Wins; 6) Away goals; 7) Penalty points (sec 9.5); 8) 12-point sending off offences

==== Results summary ====
Overall								Home						Away					
Pld	W	D	L	GF	GA	GD	Pts	W	D	L	GF	GA	GD	W	D	L	GF	GA	GD
14	2	3	9	14	26	−12	9	1	2	4	7	13	−6	1	1	5	7	13	−6

Last updated: 14 November 2026.
Source: Soccerway

==== Matches ====
On 25 June, the League One fixtures were revealed.

Win Draw Loss Fixtures

15 August 2026 1	Barnsley	0–1	Bromley	Barnsley
15:00 BST	Bland (yellow card) 38'; McGeehan (yellow card) 77'; Kirk (yellow card) 90+5'	Report	Adeboyejo 70'; Pinnock (yellow card) 77'; Hondermarck (yellow card) 90+1'	Stadium: Oakwell; Attendance: 11,163; Referee: Ross Martin

22 August 2026 2	Doncaster Rovers	0–0	Barnsley	Doncaster
12:30 BST	Thomas (yellow card) 61'		Earl (yellow card) 83'	Stadium: Club Doncaster Sports Village; Referee: David Webb
Note: Fixture was initially scheduled for a 15:00 kick-off, but was brought forward for live Sky Sports.

29 August 2026 3	Leyton Orient	1–3	Barnsley	Leyton
15:00 BST	Hayden (yellow card) 29'; Springett (yellow card) 73'; Archibald (yellow card) 75'; Stevens (yellow card) 78'; Oyekunle 85'	Report	Kirk 15'; Bland (yellow card) 28'; Noslin (yellow card) 62'; McGeehan 64', (yellow card) 69'; Gale (yellow card) 67'; Cleary 76'	Stadium: Brisbane Road; Referee: Scott Jackson

2 September 2026 4	Barnsley	2–1	Blackpool	Barnsley
19:45 BST	McGeehan 61'; Key (yellow card) 78'; Richards 87'; Kelly (yellow card) 90'; Farrell (yellow card) 90'	Report	Honeyman (yellow card) 37'; Munroe (yellow card) 60'; Bowler 65'; Hamilton (yellow card) 72'; Anderson (yellow card) 90+1'	Stadium: Oakwell; Referee: Jamie O'Connor
Note: Fixture was initially scheduled for 1 September, but was pushed back 24-hours.

5 September 2026 5	Barnsley	1–5	Stevenage	Barnsley
15:00 BST	McGeehan 17' (pen.); Kelly (yellow card) 85'	Report	Piergianni (yellow card) 16'; Sanderson 43'; Kemp 52', 66'; Vancooten 57'; Earley (yellow card) 86'; Mellon 90+2'	Stadium: Oakwell; Referee: Neil Hair

12 September 2026 6	Plymouth Argyle	3–0	Barnsley	Plymouth
15:00 BST	Irow 1'; Curtis 21'; Pepple 50'; Ross (yellow card) 76'; Evans (yellow card) 80'	Report	Gale (yellow card) 9'; Noslin (yellow card) 90'	Stadium: Home Park; Attendance: 15,743; Referee: Martin Woods

19 September 2026 7	Barnsley	1–1	Leicester City	Barnsley
12:30 BST	Connell (red card) 26'; Cleary 61'; Kelly (yellow card) 71'; Kay (yellow card) 89'; Bland (yellow card) 90+1'; Taylor (yellow card) 90+6'		Cullen 7'; Aluko (yellow card) 11'; Alves (yellow card) 46'; Braybrooke (yellow card) 56'; Page (yellow card) 63'	Stadium: Oakwell; Referee: Seb Stockbridge
Note: Fixture was initially scheduled for a 15:00 kick-off, but was brought forward for live Sky Sports.

10 October 2026 10	Stockport County	3–1	Barnsley	Edgeley
15:00 BST	Wootton 61', 73'; Wood (yellow card) 63'; Mandron 90'	Report	Kelly 13'; McGeehan (yellow card) 25'; Shepherd (yellow card) 83'	Stadium: Edgeley Park; Attendance: 9,790; Referee: Martin Coy

17 October 2026 11	Barnsley	1–2	Cambridge United	Barnsley
15:00 BST	Cleary (yellow card) 38'; Yoganathan 41'; Kay (yellow card) 43'; O'Riordan (yellow card) 46'; Adeyemo (yellow card) 76'; Shepherd (yellow card) 90+5'		Bangura-Williams (yellow card) 48'; Lavery (yellow card) 50', (goal) 90+1'; Knight 52', (yellow card) 79'	Stadium: Oakwell; Referee: David Rock

20 October 2026 12	Luton Town	2–1	Barnsley	Luton
19:45 BST	Andersen 2', (yellow card) 45+1'; Wells 41'; Richards (yellow card) 75'	Report	Kirk 58'; Richards (yellow card) 90'	Stadium: Kenilworth Road; Attendance: 9,840; Referee: Carl Brook

24 October 2026 13	Reading	2–1	Barnsley	Reading
15:00 BST	Lisbie 54', 68'; O'Connor (yellow card) 60'	Report	Yoganathan 7'	Stadium: Select Car Leasing Stadium; Attendance: 10,670; Referee: Scott Oldham

31 October 2026 14	Barnsley	1–1	Oxford United	Barnsley
15:00 GMT	Shepherd (red card) 9'; Yoganathan 32'; McGeehan (yellow card) 58'; Kelly (yellow card) 67'	Report	Spencer (yellow card) 11'; Harris 60'; Long (yellow card) 68'; Cumming (red card) 88'	Stadium: Oakwell; Attendance: 9,415; Referee: Oliver Mackey

14 November 2026 15	Wigan Athletic	2–1	Barnsley	Wigan
15:00 GMT	Murray 36'; Saydee (yellow card) 52'; Power (yellow card) 66'; Weir 75'	Report	Larkeche (yellow card) 20'; McGeehan (yellow card) 22', (goal) 57'	Stadium: Brick Community Stadium; Attendance: 8,484; Referee: Stephen Parkinson

20 November 2026 16	Barnsley	1–2	Sheffield Wednesday	Barnsley
20:00 GMT	Yoganathan (yellow card) 29', (goal) 40'; Kay (yellow card) 35'	Report	J. Lowe 8', 14'; Mitchell (yellow card) 41'; Slattery (yellow card) 53'; Valery (yellow card) 69'	Stadium: Oakwell; Attendance: 16,428; Referee: Ollie Yates
Note: Fixture was initially scheduled for 21 November, but was brought forward to the night prior for live Sky Sports broadcasting.

24 November 2026 8	Bradford City	v	Barnsley	Bradford
19:45 GMT				Stadium: Mbanq Valley Parade
Note: Fixture was initially scheduled for 26 September, but was rearranged due to international call-ups.

28 November 2026 17	AFC Wimbledon	v	Barnsley	Wimbledon
15:00 GMT				Stadium: The Cherry Red Records Stadium

1 December 2026 18	Barnsley	v	Wycombe Wanderers	Barnsley
19:45 GMT				Stadium: Oakwell

12 December 2026 19	Peterborough United	v	Barnsley	Peterborough
15:00 GMT				Stadium: Weston Homes Stadium

15 December 2026 9	Barnsley	v	Milton Keynes Dons	Barnsley
19:45 GMT				Stadium: Oakwell
Note: Fixture was originally scheduled for 3 October, but it was postponed due to international call-ups. It was then rearranged for 15 December.

19 December 2026 20	Barnsley	v	Huddersfield Town	Barnsley
12:30 GMT				Stadium: Oakwell
Note: Fixture was initially scheduled for a 15:00 kick-off, but was brought forward for live Sky Sports broadcasting.

=== FA Cup ===
Barnsley were drawn at home to Aldershot Town in the first round and away to Wigan Athletic in the second round.

Win Draw Loss Fixtures

7 November 2026 First round	Barnsley	7–2	Aldershot Town	Barnsley
15:00 GMT	McGeehan 20', 62', 67'; Cleary 26'; Gale (yellow card) 30'; Yoganathan 33', 45+2'; Okedina (yellow card) 65'; Brownlie 87'; Connell (yellow card) 90+1'	Report	Robinson (yellow card) 74'; Lewis 75', 86'	Stadium: Oakwell; Attendance: 3,701; Referee: Steven Copeland

4–7 December 2026 Second round	Wigan Athleic	v	Barnsley	Wigan
TBA GMT				Stadium: Brick Community Stadium

=== EFL Cup ===
Barnley were drawn at home to Wigan Athletic in the first round, Crewe Alexandra in the second round and away to Peterborough United in the third round.

Win Draw Loss Fixtures

8 August 2026 First round	Barnsley	1–1 (6–5 p)	Wigan Athetic	Barnsley
15:00 BST	McGeehan 81'	Report	Costelloe 40'	Stadium: Oakwell; Attendance: 4,414; Referee: Richard Eley
	Penalties
	McGeehan (penalty scored); Kelly (penalty scored); Gale (penalty scored); Connell (penalty scored); Cleary (penalty scored); Earl (penalty scored)		Power (penalty scored); Carragher (penalty scored); Higgins (penalty scored); Weir (penalty scored); Murray (penalty scored); Mellish (penalty missed)

25 August 2026 Second round	Barnsley	3–2	Crewe Alexandra	Barnsley
19:45 BST	Cleary 29'; Noslin 31'; O'Keefe 38'		Thibaut 21'; Ewusi 89'	Stadium: Oakwell; Attendance: 3,002; Referee: Leigh Doughty

15 September 2026 Third round	Peterborough United	3–3 (7–6 p)	Barnsley	Peterborough
19:30 BST	Loenard 19', (yellow card) 76'; Ormerod 27', 88'; Edwards (yellow card) 68'; Mendonça (yellow card) 90+4'		McGeehan 1', (yellow card) 61'; O'Riordan (yellow card) 26'; Cleary 40', 74'; Richards (yellow card) 51'	Stadium: Weston Homes Stadium
	Penalties
	Loenard (penalty scored); Ormerod (penalty scored); Conn-Clarke (penalty scored); Mills (penalty scored); Kelly (penalty scored); Feeney (penalty scored); Jones (penalty scored)		(penalty scored) Connell; (penalty scored) Kelly; (penalty scored) Noslin; (penalty scored) Kay; (penalty scored) Cleary; (penalty scored) Gale; (penalty missed) Alker

=== EFL Trophy ===
==== Group stage ====
Barnsley were drawn against Fleetwood Town, Oldham Athletic and Leeds United U21 in the Northern Group G.

Pos	Div	Team	Pld	W	PW	PL	L	GF	GA	GD	Pts	Qualification
1	L2	Oldham Athletic (A)	3	2	0	0	1	7	7	0	6	Advance to Round 2
2	L2	Fleetwood Town	2	1	0	0	1	4	2	+2	3	Advance to Round 2
3	L1	Barnsley (E)	3	1	0	0	2	9	10	−1	3	
4	ACA	Leeds United U21	2	1	0	0	1	6	7	−1	3	

Updated to match(es) played on 11 November 2026. Source: EFL
(A) Advances to a further round; (E) Eliminated

Win Draw Loss Fixtures

22 September 2026 1	Barnsley	3–4	Leeds United U21	Barnsley
19:00 BST	Shepherd (yellow card) 34'; Graham (yellow card) 66'; Yoganathan 80'; Richards 84'; Connell 87'	Report	Mills 19', 41', 70'; McDonald 43'; Matykiewicz (yellow card) 79'	Stadium: Oakwell; Attendance: 1,590; Referee: Aaron Bannister

6 October 2026 2	Fleetwood Town	4–1	Barnsley	Fleetwood
19:00 BST	Cirino (yellow card) 13'; Lane (yellow card) 40'; Coughlan 59' (pen.); Davies 62'; Loupalo-Bi 67'; Robertson (yellow card) 72'; Sawkins 87'	Report	Brownlie 81'	Stadium: Highbury Stadium; Attendance: 487; Referee: Andrew Miller

11 November 2026 3	Barnsley	5–2	Oldham Athletic	Barnsley
19:00 GMT	Kirk 25', 41'; Johnson 32'; Ravenhill (yellow card) 53'; Alker 67'; Yoganathan 89'	Report	Nevitt (yellow card) 37'; Hill 63'; Drummond 71'	Stadium: Oakwell; Attendance: 1,025; Referee: Aaron Jackson
Note: Fixture was initially scheduled for 10 November, but was pushed back a day due to Oldham also in action in the FA Cup on the preceding Sunday.

== Statistics ==
=== Appearances and goals ===
As of match played 14 November 2026

Players with no appearances are not included on the list; italics indicate a loaned in player

No.	Pos	Nat	Player	Total		League One		FA Cup		EFL Cup		EFL Trophy	
No.	Pos	Nat	Player	Apps	Goals	Apps	Goals	Apps	Goals	Apps	Goals	Apps	Goals
1	GK	(Scotland) SCO	Cieran Slicker	5	0	4+0	0	1+0	0	0+0	0	0+0	0
2	DF	(England) ENG	Arley Kay	19	0	13+0	0	1+0	0	3+0	0	1+1	0
3	DF	(France) FRA	Ziyad Larkeche	7	0	4+2	0	1+0	0	0+0	0	0+0	0
4	DF	(England) ENG	Sam Gale	17	0	10+1	0	1+0	0	3+0	0	1+1	0
5	DF	(England) ENG	Jack Shepherd	9	0	6+0	0	0+0	0	0+0	0	3+0	0
6	DF	(Republic of Ireland) IRL	Connor O'Riordan	10	0	8+0	0	0+0	0	1+0	0	1+0	0
7	FW	(England) ENG	Tobi Adeyemo	5	0	4+0	0	1+0	0	0+0	0	0+0	0
8	MF	(England) ENG	Cameron McGeehan	17	9	13+0	4	1+0	3	3+0	2	0+0	0
9	FW	(Northern Ireland) NIR	Makenzie Kirk	14	4	6+4	2	0+1	0	2+0	0	1+0	2
10	FW	(Ivory Coast) CIV	Ben Hamed Touré	4	0	1+1	0	0+0	0	1+0	0	1+0	0
11	DF	(Curaçao) CUW	Tyrese Noslin	16	1	9+3	0	0+1	0	2+0	1	1+0	0
12	DF	(Malawi) MAW	Jubril Okedina	7	0	1+3	0	1+0	0	0+0	0	2+0	0
13	FW	(Australia) AUS	Clayton Taylor	11	0	0+5	0	0+1	0	0+2	0	2+1	0
14	MF	(Jamaica) JAM	Daniel Johnson	4	1	1+1	0	1+0	0	0+0	0	1+0	1
17	FW	(England) ENG	Amani Richards	17	2	3+9	1	0+0	0	2+0	0	1+2	1
19	FW	(England) ENG	Reyes Cleary	18	6	12+1	2	1+0	1	3+0	3	1+0	0
22	MF	(Northern Ireland) NIR	Patrick Kelly	16	1	12+0	1	0+1	0	3+0	0	0+0	0
25	GK	(England) ENG	Rogan Ravenhill	13	0	9+0	0	0+0	0	2+0	0	2+0	0
30	MF	(Wales) WAL	Jonathan Bland	12	0	5+4	0	0+0	0	1+1	0	1+0	0
32	FW	(Australia) AUS	Rylan Brownlie	10	2	3+3	0	0+1	1	0+0	0	2+1	1
33	DF	(England) ENG	Robson Woodcock	2	0	0+0	0	0+0	0	0+0	0	2+0	0
34	MF	(England) ENG	Noah Town	7	0	0+3	0	0+0	0	0+3	0	0+1	0
36	FW	(England) ENG	Luke Alker	12	1	5+1	0	0+0	0	2+1	0	1+2	1
37	DF	(England) ENG	Calum Hudson	1	0	0+1	0	0+0	0	0+0	0	0+0	0
38	MF	(England) ENG	Noah Saunders	2	0	0+0	0	0+0	0	0+1	0	1+0	0
39	FW	(England) ENG	Leo Farrell	6	0	0+3	0	0+0	0	0+1	0	2+0	0
41	MF	(England) ENG	Kieran Graham	3	0	0+0	0	0+0	0	0+0	0	0+3	0
44	MF	(Republic of Ireland) IRL	Tayo Dunne	1	0	0+0	0	0+0	0	0+1	0	0+0	0
45	MF	(Wales) WAL	Vimal Yoganathan	11	7	6+1	3	1+0	2	0+0	0	1+2	2
46	FW	(England) ENG	O'Rian Reid	5	0	0+3	0	0+0	0	0+0	0	1+1	0
48	MF	(Republic of Ireland) IRL	Luca Connell	15	1	6+3	0	1+0	0	2+0	0	3+0	1
51	GK	(England) ENG	Kieren Flavell	2	0	0+0	0	0+0	0	1+0	0	1+0	0
Player(s) who featured but departed the club permanently during the season:
7	DF	(Republic of Ireland) IRL	Corey O'Keeffe	2	1	0+1	0	0	0	1	1	0	0
32	DF	(England) ENG	Josh Earl	3	0	2	0	0	0	1	0	0	0
