= Amani Richards =

English footballer (born 2004)

Personal information
- Full name: Amani Tye Louis-Marie Richards
- Date of birth: 16 November 2004 (age 21)
- Place of birth: Camden, England
- Height: 1.76 m (5 ft 9 in)
- Position: Forward

Team information
- Current team: Barnsley
- Number: 17

Youth career
- –2021: Chelsea
- 2021–2022: Arsenal
- 2022–2024: Leicester City

Senior career*
Years	Team	Apps	(Gls)
2024–2026	Leicester City	0	(0)
2024–2025	→ Exeter City (loan)	6	(1)
2026–	Barnsley	12	(1)

International career
2019	England U16	2	(0)
- * Club domestic league appearances and goals as of 19:14, 14 November 2026 (UTC)

Amani Tye Louis-Marie Richards (born 16 November 2004) is an English professional footballer who plays as a forward for EFL League One club Barnsley.

== Club career ==
Richards moved from Chelsea to Arsenal in March 2021, signing his first professional contract in December of the same year. The following month he left the club, signing with Leicester City in January 2022. At the end of the 2022–23 season, he was named Academy player of the season for his performance in U18 Premier League.

On 29 August 2024, Richards joined Exeter City on a season-long loan. He made his professional debut with the club two days later, coming on as a substitute in the 73rd minute of a 2–0 away win over Bolton Wanderers in League One. Richards scored his first senior goal on 1 October 2024 in a 1–0 away win at Leyton Orient. On 15 January 2025, Richards was recalled from his loan at Exeter City.

On 15 July 2026, Richards signed a three-year contract at EFL League One club Barnsley for an undisclosed fee.

== International career ==
Richards is an England youth international.

== Career statistics ==
As of match played 14 November 2026

Appearances and goals by club, season and competition
Club	Season	League			FA Cup		EFL Cup		Other		Total	
Club	Season	Division	Apps	Goals	Apps	Goals	Apps	Goals	Apps	Goals	Apps	Goals
Leicester City U21	2023–24	—			—		—		3 (Note: Appearance(s) in EFL Trophy)	0	3	0
Leicester City U21	2024–25	—			—		—		1	1	1	1
Leicester City U21	2025–26	—			—		—		0	0	0	0
Leicester City U21	Total		—		—		—		4	1	4	1
Exeter City (loan)	2024–25	League One	6	1	0	0	0	0	0	0	6	1
Barnsley	2026–27	League One	12	1	0	0	2	0	3	1	17	2
Career total			18	2	0	0	2	0	7	2	27	4
