= Ben Hamed Touré =

Ivorian footballer (born 2003)

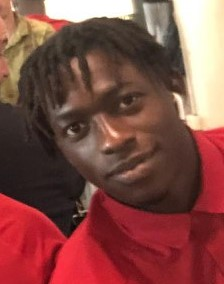
- Touré in 2023

Personal information
- Full name: Ben Hamed Touré
- Date of birth: 21 August 2003 (age 23)
- Place of birth: Yassap Lopou, Ivory Coast
- Height: 1.85 m (6 ft 1 in)
- Position: Forward

Team information
- Current team: Barnsley
- Number: 10

Youth career
- 2020–2021: LYS Sassandra
- 2021–2022: Ajaccio

Senior career*
Years	Team	Apps	(Gls)
2022–2025	Ajaccio B	30	(10)
2023–2025	Ajaccio	51	(7)
2025–2026	Annecy	20	(3)
2026–	Barnsley	2	(0)
- * Club domestic league appearances and goals as of 12:34, 10 October 2026 (UTC)

Ben Hamed Touré (born 21 August 2003) is an Ivorian professional footballer who plays as a forward for EFL League One club Barnsley.

== Career ==
On 7 May 2023, Touré made his professional debut for Ajaccio in a 0–0 Ligue 1 draw at home against Toulouse, coming on as a 75th-minute substitute. He made his first professional start in a 3–0 league loss away to Lens on 27 May 2023. Following the match, Ajaccio's team bus departed Lens's Stade Bollaert-Delelis without Touré, leaving him stranded in front of the stadium's parking lot among Lens supporters. Touré was recorded saying that the team "forgot" him. Eventually, the bus went back to pick him up and he was able to return with his teammates.

He signed for Barnsley in August 2026.

== Career statistics ==
As of match played on 22 September 2026

Appearances and goals by club, season and competition
Club	Season	League			National cup		League cup		Other		Total	
Club	Season	Division	Apps	Goals	Apps	Goals	Apps	Goals	Apps	Goals	Apps	Goals
Ajaccio	2021–22	Ligue 2	0	0	0	0	0	0	0	0	0	0
Ajaccio	2022–23	Ligue 1	4	0	0	0	0	0	0	0	4	0
Ajaccio	2023–24	Ligue 2	27	4	2	0	0	0	0	0	29	4
Ajaccio	2024–25	Ligue 2	20	3	1	0	0	0	0	0	21	3
Ajaccio	Total		51	7	3	0	0	0	0	0	54	7
Ajaccio B	2021–22	Championnat National 3	11	3	0	0	0	0	0	0	11	3
Ajaccio B	2022–23	Championnat National 3	15	7	0	0	0	0	0	0	15	7
Ajaccio B	2023–24	Championnat National 3	3	0	0	0	0	0	0	0	3	0
Ajaccio B	2024–25	Championnat National 3	1	0	0	0	0	0	0	0	1	0
Ajaccio B	Total		30	10	0	0	0	0	0	0	30	10
Annecy	2025–26	Ligue 2	20	3	2	0	0	0	0	0	22	3
Barnsley	2026–27	League One	2	0	0	0	1	0	1 (Note: One appearance in EFL Trophy)	0	4	0
Career total			103	20	5	0	1	0	1	0	110	20
