= Christopher Ibayi =

Footballer (born 1995)

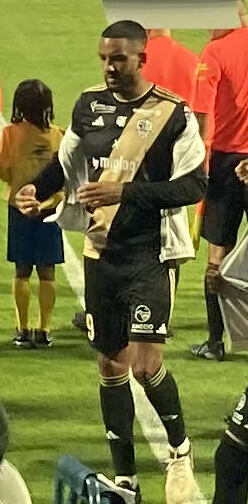
- Ibayi with Ajaccio in 2024

Personal information
- Date of birth: 18 July 1995 (age 31)
- Place of birth: Porto-Vecchio, France
- Height: 1.87 m (6 ft 2 in)
- Position: Striker

Team information
- Current team: MAS

Senior career*
| Years | Team | Apps | (Gls) |
| 2012–2015 | Bastia B | 23 | (4) |
| 2015–2016 | Tours B | 11 | (2) |
| 2016–2018 | Lucciana | 18 | (6) |
| 2018–2020 | Granville | 39 | (17) |
| 2020 | Trélissac | 3 | (0) |
| 2021–2022 | Versailles | 24 | (10) |
| 2022–2023 | Rouen | 43 | (30) |
| 2024–2025 | Ajaccio | 36 | (8) |
| 2025–2026 | Thun | 46 | (13) |
| 2026– | MAS | 0 | (0) |

International career^{‡}
| 2024– | Congo | 4 | (2) |
- * Club domestic league appearances and goals as of 26 May 2026 ‡ National team caps and goals as of 19 April 2026

Christopher Ibayi (born 18 July 1995) is a professional footballer who plays as a striker for Moroccan club MAS. Born in France, he plays for the Congo national team.

== Early life ==
Ibayi was born in 1995 in France. He is the son of former footballer Edmond Ibayi.

== Career ==
In 2022, Ibayi signed for French side Rouen. In 2024, he signed for French side Ajaccio.

On 25 January 2025, Ibayi joined Thun in Switzerland on a two-and-a-half-year contract. He helped Thun win the 2024–25 Swiss Challenge League, and the following season their first ever first division title, the 2025–26 Swiss Super League.

== Style of play ==
Ibayi mainly operates as a striker. He has been known for his defensive involvement.

== Personal life ==
Ibayi is a native of Porto-Vecchio, France and is of Congolese descent. He is a Christian.

== Career statistics ==
=== Club ===
As of match played 10 May 2026

Appearances and goals by club, season and competition
| Club | Season | League | | | National cup (Note: Includes Coupe de France, Swiss Cup) | | Europe | | Total | |
| Club | Season | Division | Apps | Goals | Apps | Goals | Apps | Goals | Apps | Goals |
|---|---|---|---|---|---|---|---|---|---|---|
| Bastia B | 2012–13 | CFA 2 | 0 | 0 | — | | — | | 0 | 0 |
| Bastia B | 2013–14 | CFA 2 | 7 | 0 | — | | — | | 7 | 0 |
| Bastia B | 2014–15 | CFA 2 | 16 | 4 | — | | — | | 16 | 4 |
| Bastia B | Total | | 23 | 4 | — | | — | | 23 | 4 |
| Bastia | 2014–15 | Ligue 1 | 0 | 0 | 1 | 0 | — | | 1 | 0 |
| Tours B | 2015–16 | CFA 2 | 11 | 2 | — | | — | | 11 | 2 |
| Lucciana | 2017–18 | Championnat National 3 | 18 | 6 | 0 | 0 | — | | 18 | 6 |
| Granville | 2018–19 | Championnat National 2 | 22 | 11 | 0 | 0 | — | | 22 | 11 |
| Granville | 2019–20 | Championnat National 2 | 17 | 6 | 3 | 1 | — | | 20 | 7 |
| Granville | Total | | 39 | 17 | 3 | 1 | — | | 42 | 18 |
| Trélissac | 2020–21 | Championnat National 2 | 3 | 0 | 1 | 0 | — | | 4 | 0 |
| Versailles | 2021–22 | Championnat National 2 | 24 | 10 | 9 | 6 | — | | 31 | 15 |
| Rouen | 2022–23 | Championnat National 2 | 28 | 22 | 0 | 0 | — | | 28 | 22 |
| Rouen | 2023–24 | Championnat National | 15 | 8 | 2 | 2 | — | | 15 | 8 |
| Rouen | Total | | 43 | 30 | 2 | 2 | — | | 43 | 30 |
| Ajaccio | 2023–24 | Ligue 2 | 17 | 6 | 0 | 0 | — | | 17 | 6 |
| Ajaccio | 2024–25 | Ligue 2 | 19 | 2 | 0 | 0 | — | | 13 | 2 |
| Ajaccio | Total | | 36 | 8 | 0 | 0 | — | | 36 | 8 |
| Thun | 2024–25 | Swiss Challenge League | 16 | 3 | 0 | 0 | — | | 16 | 3 |
| Thun | 2025–26 | Swiss Super League | 29 | 10 | 1 | 0 | — | | 30 | 10 |
| Thun | Total | | 45 | 13 | 1 | 0 | — | | 46 | 13 |
| Career total | | | 242 | 87 | 17 | 9 | — | | 259 | 96 |

=== International ===
As of match played 14 November 2024

Appearances and goals by national team and year
| National team | Year | Apps | Goals |
|---|---|---|---|
| Congo | 2024 | 4 | 2 |
| Total | | 4 | 2 |

Scores and results list Congo's goal tally first, score column indicates score after each Ibayi goal.

List of international goals scored by Christopher Ibayi
| No. | Date | Venue | Opponent | Score | Result | Competition | Ref. |
|---|---|---|---|---|---|---|---|
| 1 | 14 November 2024 | Juba Stadium, Juba, South Sudan | South Sudan | 1–0 | 2–3 | 2025 Africa Cup of Nations qualification | |
| 2 | 14 November 2024 | Juba Stadium, Juba, South Sudan | South Sudan | 2–1 | 2–3 | 2025 Africa Cup of Nations qualification | |

== Honours ==
Thun

- Swiss Super League: 2025–26
- Swiss Challenge League: 2024–25
