= Kastriot Imeri =

Swiss footballer (born 2000)

Personal information
- Date of birth: 27 June 2000 (age 26)
- Place of birth: Geneva, Switzerland
- Height: 1.73 m (5 ft 8 in)
- Position: Midfielder

Team information
- Current team: Union Berlin
- Number: 30

Youth career
- 2005–2013: Meyrin
- 2013–2017: Servette

Senior career*
Years	Team	Apps	(Gls)
2017–2022	Servette	135	(17)
2022–2026	Young Boys	63	(7)
2025–2026	→ Thun (loan)	30	(6)
2026–	Union Berlin	3	(0)

International career
2016	Switzerland U16	3	(0)
2016–2017	Switzerland U17	5	(0)
2017–2018	Switzerland U18	2	(0)
2018–2019	Switzerland U19	7	(1)
2019–2021	Switzerland U20	3	(0)
2020–2023	Switzerland U21	24	(9)
2021	Switzerland	1	(0)
- * Club domestic league appearances and goals as of 1 November 2026

Kastriot Imeri (born 27 June 2000) is a Swiss professional footballer who plays as a midfielder for German Bundesliga club Union Berlin.

== Career ==
Imeri joined Servette's youth academy from FC Meyrin. At only 16 years of age, he debuted in the first team on 6 March 2017 in a 1-0 away victory over Le Mont in the Swiss Challenge League. From the following season onward, he fully joined the first team. He shot his first goal in a 4-0 victory over FC Aarau on 24 February 2018. He accompanied his team to promotion to the Swiss Super League as Challenge League champions in the 2018-19 season.

In the 2021-22 season, his final season at Servette, he scored the most goals for his team with eleven goals in 26 games, the eight most of the entire league.

On 16 August 2022, despite lucrative interest from foreign leagues, he signed a four-year deal with fellow Swiss Super League side BSC Young Boys for a Swiss record transfer fee 3.5m CHF. On 6 November 2024, Imeri scored his debut goal in the UEFA Champions League in a 2-1 defeat against Shakhtar Donetsk.

On 14 August 2025, Imeri was loaned by Thun, with an option to buy. He helped Thun win their first ever first division title, the 2025–26 Swiss Super League.

On 1 September 2026, Imeri signed with Union Berlin in Germany, reuniting with his Thun coach Mauro Lustrinelli.

== International career ==
Born in Switzerland, Imeri is of Albanian descent and is originally from Kosovo. Imeri captained the Swiss youth team at several occasions before making his debut on senior level.

He made his debut for Switzerland national team on 12 November 2021 in a World Cup qualifier against Italy.

== Career statistics ==
=== Club ===
As of match played 1 November 2026

Appearances and goals by club, season and competition
Club	Season	League			Swiss Cup		Continental		Other		Total	
Club	Season	Division	Apps	Goals	Apps	Goals	Apps	Goals	Apps	Goals	Apps	Goals
Servette	2016–17	Swiss Challenge League	1	0	—		—		—		1	0
Servette	2017–18	Swiss Challenge League	26	1	1	0	—		—		27	1
Servette	2018–19	Swiss Challenge League	29	3	0	0	—		—		29	3
Servette	2019–20	Swiss Super League	24	1	1	0	—		—		25	1
Servette	2020–21	Swiss Super League	29	1	3	2	2 (Note: Appearances in UEFA Europa League)	0	—		34	3
Servette	2021–22	Swiss Super League	26	11	2	0	1 (Note: Appearances in UEFA Conference League)	0	—		29	11
Servette	Total		135	17	7	2	3	0	—		145	19
Young Boys	2022–23	Swiss Super League	27	5	4	1	1	0	0	0	32	6
Young Boys	2023–24	Swiss Super League	10	0	1	1	2 (Note: Appearances in UEFA Champions League)	0	0	0	13	1
Young Boys	2024–25	Swiss Super League	23	1	2	0	5	1	—		30	2
Young Boys	2026–27	Swiss Super League	3	1	0	0	—		—		3	1
Young Boys	Total		63	7	7	2	8	1	0	0	78	10
Thun (loan)	2025–26	Swiss Super League	30	6	1	0	—		—		31	6
Union Berlin	2026–27	Bundesliga	3	0	0	0	—		—		3	0
Career total			231	30	15	4	11	1	0	0	257	35

=== International ===
Appearances and goals by national team and year
National team	Year	Apps	Goals
Switzerland	2021	1	0
Total		1	0

== Honours ==
Servette

- Swiss Challenge League: 2018–19

Young Boys

- Swiss Super League: 2022–23
- Swiss Cup: 2022–23

Thun

- Swiss Super League: 2025–26

Individual

- Swiss Super League Young Player of the Year: 2020–21
