= Tony Strata =

Footballer (born 2004)

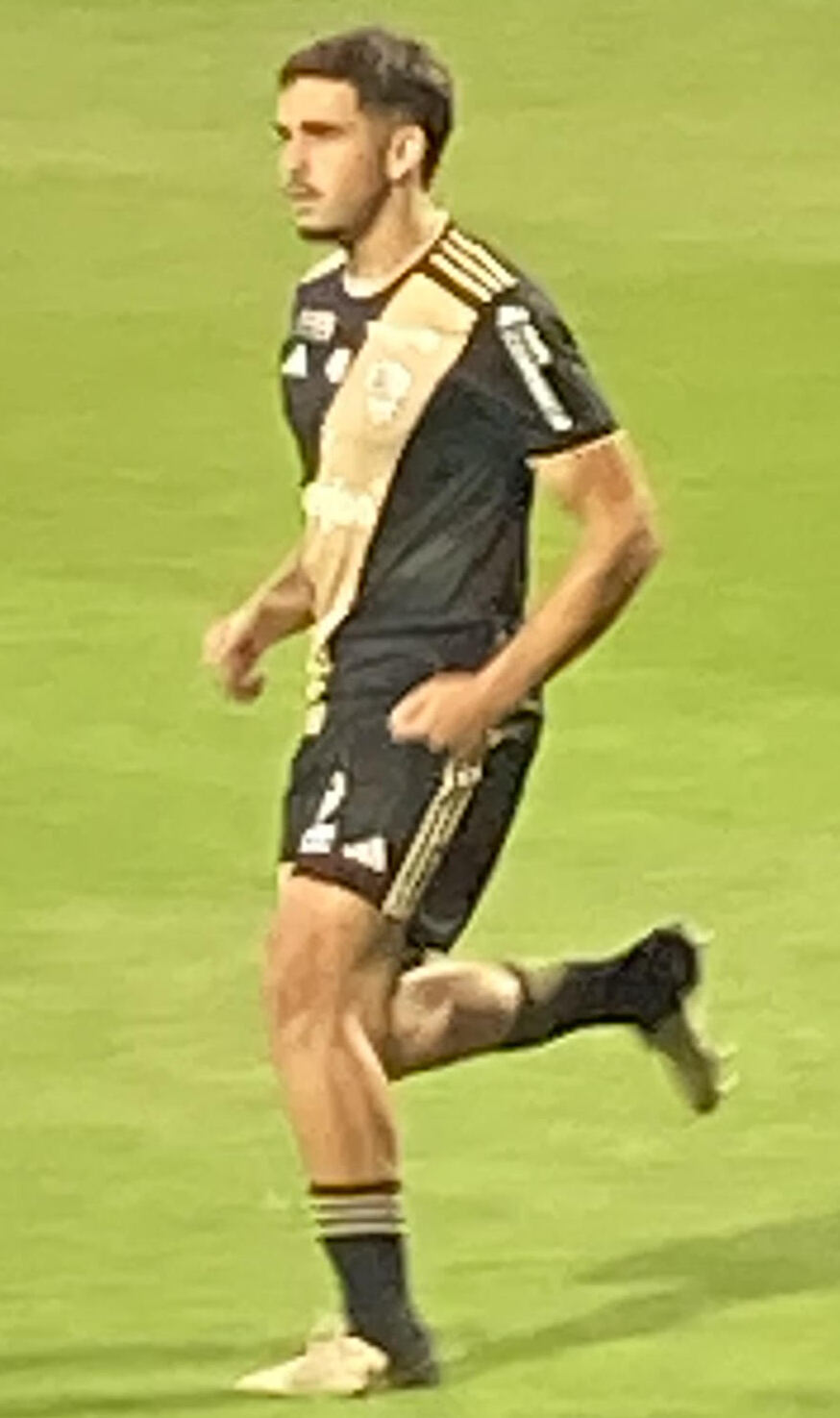
- Strata with Ajaccio in 2024

Personal information
- Full name: Anthony Joseph Patrick Strata
- Date of birth: 7 September 2004 (age 22)
- Place of birth: Marseille, France
- Height: 1.77 m (5 ft 10 in)
- Position: Full-back

Team information
- Current team: Vitória Guimarães
- Number: 23

Youth career
- SC Air Bel
- Burel FC
- –2021: Istres
- 2021–2023: Ajaccio

Senior career*
Years	Team	Apps	(Gls)
2022–2025	Ajaccio B	16	(1)
2023–2025	Ajaccio	49	(1)
2025–	Vitória Guimarães	30	(1)
2025	Vitória Guimarães B	1	(0)

International career^{‡}
2023–2024	Romania U20	8	(0)
2024–2026	Romania U21	12	(0)
2026–	Romania	3	(0)
- * Club domestic league appearances and goals as of 25 October 2026 ‡ National team caps and goals as of 17 November 2026

Anthony Joseph Patrick Strata (born 7 September 2004) is a professional footballer who plays as a full-back for Primeira Liga club Vitória Guimarães. Born in France, he plays for the Romania national team.

== Club career ==
Born in France, Strata made his debut for Ajaccio on 21 May 2023, in a 5–0 Ligue 1 loss to Rennes. On 21 August 2023, he played his first match in Ligue 2 against Bordeaux.

After the bankruptcy of AC Ajaccio, he was released and signed, on 27 August 2025, with Vitória Guimarães for 4 years. On 10 January 2026, Strata played in the Portuguese Taça da Liga final against Braga in which Vitória Guimarães won 2-1.

== Personal life ==
Strata was born in Marseille to a Corsican father and a Romanian mother from Sălaj.

== Career statistics ==
As of match played 25 October 2026.

Appearances and goals by club, season and competition
Club	Season	League			National Cup (Note: Includes Coupe de France, Taça de Portugal)		Continental		Other		Total	
Club	Season	Division	Apps	Goals	Apps	Goals	Apps	Goals	Apps	Goals	Apps	Goals
Ajaccio B	2021–22	Championnat National 3	1	0	—		—		—		1	0
Ajaccio B	2022–23	Championnat National 3	7	1	—		—		—		7	1
Ajaccio B	2023–24	Championnat National 3	7	0	—		—		—		7	0
Ajaccio B	2024–25	Championnat National 3	1	0	—		—		—		1	0
Ajaccio B	Total		16	1	—		—		—		16	1
Ajaccio	2022–23	Ligue 1	3	0	0	0	—		—		3	0
Ajaccio	2023–24	Ligue 2	18	0	1	0	—		—		19	0
Ajaccio	2024–25	Ligue 2	28	1	0	0	—		—		28	1
Ajaccio	Total		49	1	1	0	—		—		50	1
Vitória Guimarães	2025–26	Primeira Liga	21	1	3	0	—		3 (Note: Appearances in Taça da Liga)	0	27	1
Vitória Guimarães	2026–27	Primeira Liga	9	0	0	0	—		0	0	9	0
Vitória Guimarães	Total		30	1	3	0	—		3	0	36	1
Vitória Guimarães B	2025–26	Liga 3	1	0	—		—		—		1	0
Career total			96	3	4	0	—		3	0	103	3

=== International ===
As of match played 17 November 2026.

Appearances and goals by national team and year
National team	Year	Apps	Goals
Romania
Romania	2026	3	0
Total		3	0

== Honours ==
Vitória Guimarães

- Taça da Liga: 2025–26
