= Rogan Ravenhill =

English footballer (born 2005)

Personal information
- Full name: Rogan Lee Ravenhill
- Date of birth: 25 October 2005 (age 21)
- Place of birth: Wombwell, South Yorkshire, England
- Position: Goalkeeper

Team information
- Current team: Barnsley
- Number: 25

Youth career
- 2012–2026: Barnsley

Senior career*
Years	Team	Apps	(Gls)
2023–	Barnsley	9	(0)
2023	→ Liversedge (loan)	3	(0)
2024–2025	→ Matlock Town (loan)	21	(1)
2025	→ Leamington (loan)	18	(0)
2026	→ Macclesfield (loan)	17	(0)
- * Club domestic league appearances and goals as of 16:09, 17 October 2026 (UTC)

Rogan Lee Ravenhill (born 25 October 2005) is an English professional footballer who plays as a goalkeeper for EFL League One club Barnsley.

== Career ==
Ravenhill joined the Barnsley academy aged seven.

In September 2023, Ravenhill joined Northern Premier League Division One East club Liversedge on a one-month loan deal. Following the conclusion of the 2023–24 season, he signed a first professional contract.

In August 2024, having already featured in pre-season, he joined Northern Premier League Premier Division side Matlock Town on a six-month loan. On 24 August 2024, he scored a dramatic header in the 96th minute to rescue a 1–1 draw with Lancaster City.

In August 2025, he joined National League North club Leamington on an initial one-month youth loan. Having remained with the club beyond this initial month, he stepped back from his loan with the club to undergo surgery on a hernia in November, returning to the club following his recovery. On 20 February 2026, he signed a new three-and-a-half year deal with Barnsley, joining another National League North club, Macclesfield, on loan for the remainder of the season.

On 8 August 2026, Ravenhill made his debut for Barnsley, saving a penalty in an EFL Cup shootout victory over Wigan Athletic. Following the match, he set out his ambitions to become the club's first-choice goalkeeper, making his league debut the following week.

== Career statistics ==
As of match played 17 October 2026

Appearances and goals by club, season and competition
Club	Season	League			FA Cup		League Cup		Other		Total	
Club	Season	Division	Apps	Goals	Apps	Goals	Apps	Goals	Apps	Goals	Apps	Goals
Barnsley	2023–24	League One	0	0	0	0	0	0	0	0	0	0
Barnsley	2024–25	League One	0	0	0	0	0	0	0	0	0	0
Barnsley	2025–26	League One	0	0	0	0	0	0	0	0	0	0
Barnsley	2026–27	League One	9	0	0	0	2	0	1 (Note: Appearance(s) in FA Trophy)	0	12	0
Barnsley	Total		9	0	0	0	2	0	1	0	12	0
Liversedge (loan)	2023–24	Northern Premier League Division One East	3	0	0	0	—		1	0	4	0
Matlock Town (loan)	2024–25	Northern Premier League Premier Division	21	1	2	0	—		1	0	24	1
Leamington (loan)	2025–26	National League North	18	0	1	0	—		1	0	20	0
Macclesfield (loan)	2025–26	National League North	17	0	—		—		2 (Note: Appearance(s) in National League North play-offs)	0	19	0
Career total			68	1	3	0	2	0	6	0	79	1
