= Moussa Soumano =

French footballer (born 2005)

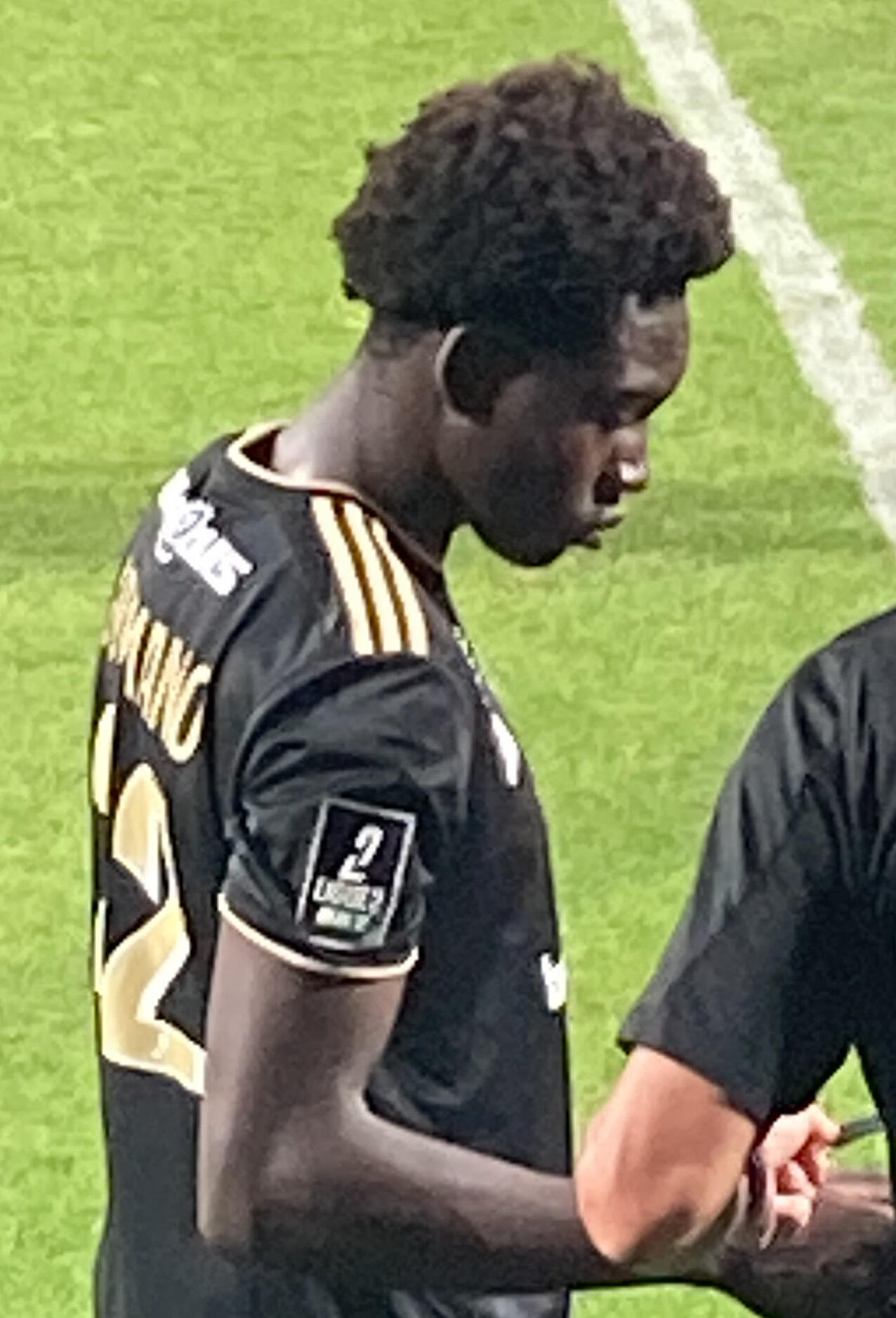
- Soumano with Ajaccio in 2024

Personal information
- Date of birth: 9 July 2005 (age 21)
- Place of birth: Saint-Denis, France
- Height: 1.85 m (6 ft 1 in)
- Position: Forward

Team information
- Current team: NAC Breda
- Number: 9

Youth career
- Red Star

Senior career*
Years	Team	Apps	(Gls)
2021–2025	Ajaccio II	15	(8)
2023–2025	Ajaccio	64	(5)
2025–	NAC Breda	16	(5)
- * Club domestic league appearances and goals as of 21 May 2026

Moussa Soumano (born 9 July 2005) is a French professional footballer who plays as a forward for Dutch Eerste Divisie club NAC Breda.

== Career ==
A youth product of Red Star, Souomano moved to Ajaccio in 2021 where he started for their reserves. He made his professional debut with Ajaccio as a starter in a 2–1 Coupe de France win over Jura Sud on 8 January 2023. He scored his first Ligue 1 goal with Ajaccio in a 2–1 win over Angers on 1 February 2023.

On 7 July 2025, Soumano signed a four-year contract with NAC Breda in the Dutch top-tier Eredivisie.

== Personal life ==
Born in France, Soumano's father is Malian and his mother is Ivorian.
