= Luke Alker =

English footballer (born 2006)

Personal information
- Full name: Luke William Alker
- Date of birth: 12 December 2006 (age 19)
- Place of birth: North Yorkshire, England
- Position: Forward

Team information
- Current team: Barnsley
- Number: 36

Youth career
- –2023: Leeds United
- 2023–2024: Barnsley

Senior career*
Years	Team	Apps	(Gls)
2024–	Barnsley	6	(0)
2026	Alfreton Town (loan)	6	(0)
- * Club domestic league appearances and goals as of 11:36, 10 October 2026 (UTC)

Luke William Alker (born 12 December 2006) is an English footballer who plays as a forward for EFL League One club Barnsley.

== Career ==
Alker joined Barnsley from the Academy at Leeds United in 2023 and became a prolific scorer for the under-18s and under-21s. He made his first-team debut for Barnsley on 8 October 2024, coming on as a 72nd-minute substitute for Aiden Marsh in a 2–0 defeat at Huddersfield Town in the EFL Trophy.

== Career statistics ==
As of match played 6 October 2026

Appearances and goals by club, season and competition
Club	Season	League			FA Cup		EFL Cup		Other		Total	
Club	Season	Division	Apps	Goals	Apps	Goals	Apps	Goals	Apps	Goals	Apps	Goals
Barnsley	2024–25	EFL League One	0	0	0	0	0	0	1 (Note: Appearance(s) in the EFL Trophy)	0	1	0
Barnsley	2025–26	EFL League One	0	0	0	0	0	0	2	0	2	0
Barnsley	2026–27	EFL League One	6	0	0	0	3	0	2	0	11	0
Barnsley	Total		6	0	0	0	3	0	5	0	14	0
Alfreton Town (loan)	2025–26	National League North	6	0	0	0	0	0	0	0	6	0
Career total			12	0	0	0	3	0	5	0	20	0
