= Reyes Cleary =

English footballer (born 2004)

Personal information
- Full name: Reyes Demar Uriah Cleary
- Date of birth: 13 April 2004 (age 22)
- Place of birth: Birmingham, England
- Height: 6 ft 1 in (1.85 m)
- Position: Forward

Team information
- Current team: Barnsley
- Number: 19

Youth career
- –2022: West Bromwich Albion

Senior career*
Years	Team	Apps	(Gls)
2022–2025	West Bromwich Albion	2	(0)
2024–2025	→ Walsall (loan)	3	(0)
2025	→ Hartlepool United (loan)	20	(6)
2025–	Barnsley	54	(9)

International career^{‡}
2023	England U19	2	(0)
- * Club domestic league appearances and goals as of 16:55, 7 November 2026 (UTC) ‡ National team caps and goals as of 13:31, 9 December 2024 (UTC)

Reyes Demar Uriah Cleary (born 13 April 2004) is an English professional footballer who plays as a forward for club Barnsley.

== Career ==
=== West Bromwich Albion ===
Cleary progressed through West Bromwich Albion's academy, and began training with the club's first team in the 2021–22 season after impressive form for the club's under-18 and under-23 teams. He was offered a professional contract by the club in December 2021. He was nominated for the Premier League 2 player of the month award for December 2021. He made his senior debut as a substitute in a 2–1 FA Cup defeat to Brighton & Hove Albion on 8 January 2022.

On 20 August 2024, Cleary joined League Two club Walsall on a season-long loan deal. He was recalled on 7 January 2025.

On 24 January 2025, Cleary joined National League side Hartlepool United on loan. He scored his first Hartlepool goal in a 2–2 draw with Tamworth. On 26 February, this loan was extended until the end of the season.

On 20 May 2025, West Brom offered Cleary a new deal at the club.

=== Barnsley ===
On 1 July 2025, Clearly joined League One side Barnsley on a three-year deal with the option of a fourth.

On 18 October 2025, Cleary scored a remarkable goal in a 2–2 draw at Bradford City. Spotting the opponents' goalkeeper off his line, Cleary scored with a soaring shot from sixty yards.

Having registered five goal contributions over an unbeaten month for Barnsley, Cleary was named EFL Young Player of the Month for November 2025.

== International career ==
Cleary received his first call-up to the England U19 squad in March 2023. On 25 March 2023, Cleary made his debut as a substitute during a 1–0 defeat to Iceland at the New York Stadium during 2023 UEFA European Under-19 Championship qualification.

== Career statistics ==
As of match played 7 November 2026

Appearances and goals by club, season and competition
Club	Season	League			FA Cup		League Cup		Other		Total	
Club	Season	Division	Apps	Goals	Apps	Goals	Apps	Goals	Apps	Goals	Apps	Goals
West Bromwich Albion	2021–22	Championship	0	0	1	0	0	0	—		1	0
West Bromwich Albion	2022–23	Championship	2	0	1	0	2	0	—		5	0
West Bromwich Albion	2023–24	Championship	0	0	0	0	0	0	—		0	0
West Bromwich Albion	2024–25	Championship	0	0	0	0	1	0	—		1	0
West Bromwich Albion	Total		2	0	2	0	3	0	0	0	7	0
Walsall (loan)	2024–25	League Two	3	0	0	0	0	0	4 (Note: Appearances in EFL Trophy)	1	7	1
Hartlepool United (loan)	2024–25	National League	20	6	0	0	0	0	0	0	20	6
Barnsley	2025–26	League One	42	7	2	0	3	0	3	0	50	7
Barnsley	2026–27	League One	12	2	1	1	3	3	1	0	17	6
Barnsley	Total		54	9	3	1	6	3	4	0	67	13
Career total			79	15	5	1	9	3	8	1	101	20

== Honours ==
Individual

- EFL Young Player of the Month: November 2025
