= Anthony Khelifa =

French footballer (born 2005)

Personal information
- Date of birth: 20 September 2005 (age 21)
- Place of birth: Marseille, France
- Position: Centre-back

Team information
- Current team: Dynamo České Budějovice
- Number: 3

Youth career
- 2008–2015: Gazélec Ajaccio
- 2015–2022: Ajaccio

Senior career*
Years	Team	Apps	(Gls)
2022–2025	Ajaccio B	31	(1)
2023–2025	Ajaccio	4	(0)
2025–	Dynamo České Budějovice	7	(0)
- * Club domestic league appearances and goals as of 28 May 2026

Anthony Khelifa (born 20 September 2005) is a French and Algerian professional footballer who plays as a centre-back for Dynamo České Budějovice.

== Career ==
A youth product of Gazélec Ajaccio, and moved over to Ajaccio's youth academy at the age of 10. He joined the regional training center at the age of 14. He reached the final of the French U17 national championship with his team, AC Ajaccio, as captain. He worked his way up Ajaccio's youth teams, captaining their U19s and debuting with their reserves in 2022. He started training with Ajaccio's senior team in January 2023. He made his professional debut with Ajaccio as a late substitute in a 3–0 Ligue 1 loss to Nice on 10 February 2023.

In October 2023, Anthony was called up to the Algerian national team in the U20 category.

In December 2023, Anthony played his first match in the French Ligue 2 championship with AC Ajaccio as a starter against Valenciennes in a 2–1 victory.

On 11 July 2025, Khelifa signed a contract with Czech National Football League club Dynamo České Budějovice.

== Personal life ==
Anthony Khelifa was born in Marseille in the south of France. He holds French and Algerian nationalities.

== Playing style ==
Khelifa played forward as a youth, but switched to centre-back. He is a complete defender who is physical, quick, and aerially dominant.
