= Charlie Lennon (English footballer) =

English footballer (born 2006)

- Lennon with Yeovil Town in 2026

Personal information
- Full name: Charlie Robert Lennon
- Date of birth: 9 April 2006 (age 20)
- Place of birth: Spennymoor, England
- Position: Winger

Team information
- Current team: Yeovil Town (on loan from Barnsley)
- Number: 27

Youth career
- 2015–2024: Middlesbrough

Senior career*
Years	Team	Apps	(Gls)
2024–2026	Middlesbrough	1	(0)
2025–2026	→ Darlington (loan)	19	(2)
2026–	Barnsley	3	(1)
2026–	→ Yeovil Town (loan)	10	(1)

International career
- England U15
2022	England U16	1	(0)
2022	England U17	3	(0)
- * Club domestic league appearances and goals as of 22:48, 21 November 2026 (UTC)

Charlie Robert Lennon (born 9 April 2006) is an English footballer who plays as a winger for National League club Yeovil Town on loan from EFL League One club Barnsley.

== Early life ==
Born in Spennymoor, Lennon attended St John's Catholic School in Bishop Auckland, achieving eight GCSEs.

== Career ==
=== Middlesbrough ===
Lennon joined the Middlesbrough academy at under-nine level, signing a first professional two-year contract in March 2024.

On 27 April 2024, Lennon made his professional first-team debut from the bench in a 4–1 thrashing of Cardiff City.

On 29 August 2025, Lennon joined National League North club Darlington on a one-month loan deal. On 15 January 2026, nine days after his loan was extended, it was announced that Middlesbrough had recalled Lennon.

=== Barnsley ===
On 17 January 2026, Lennon signed for League One club Barnsley on a three and a half year deal. He made his debut on 17 March 2026, scoring a 96th minute equaliser in a 1–1 draw with Wigan Athletic.

On 5 August 2026, Lennon joined National League club Yeovil Town on loan until January 2027.

== International career ==
Having previously represented England at both Under-15 and Under-16 levels, Lennon was called up to the under-17 squad at the 2022 Nordic Cup.

== Career statistics ==
As of match played 21 November 2026

Appearances and goals by club, season and competition
Club	Season	League			FA Cup		EFL Cup		Other		Total	
Club	Season	Division	Apps	Goals	Apps	Goals	Apps	Goals	Apps	Goals	Apps	Goals
Middlesbrough	2023–24	Championship	1	0	0	0	0	0	—		1	0
Middlesbrough	2024–25	Championship	0	0	0	0	0	0	—		0	0
Middlesbrough	2025–26	Championship	0	0	0	0	0	0	—		0	0
Middlesbrough	Total		1	0	0	0	0	0	—		1	0
Darlington (loan)	2025–26	National League North	19	2	4	1	—		1 (Note: Appearance in FA Trophy)	0	24	3
Barnsley	2025–26	League One	3	1	—		—		—		3	1
Barnsley	2026–27	League One	0	0	0	0	0	0	—		0	0
Barnsley	Total		3	1	0	0	0	0	—		3	1
Yeovil Town (loan)	2026–27	National League	10	1	3	2	—		2 (Note: Appearances in Somerset Premier Cup)	2	15	5
Career total			33	4	7	3	0	0	3	2	43	9
