= Servette =

- District
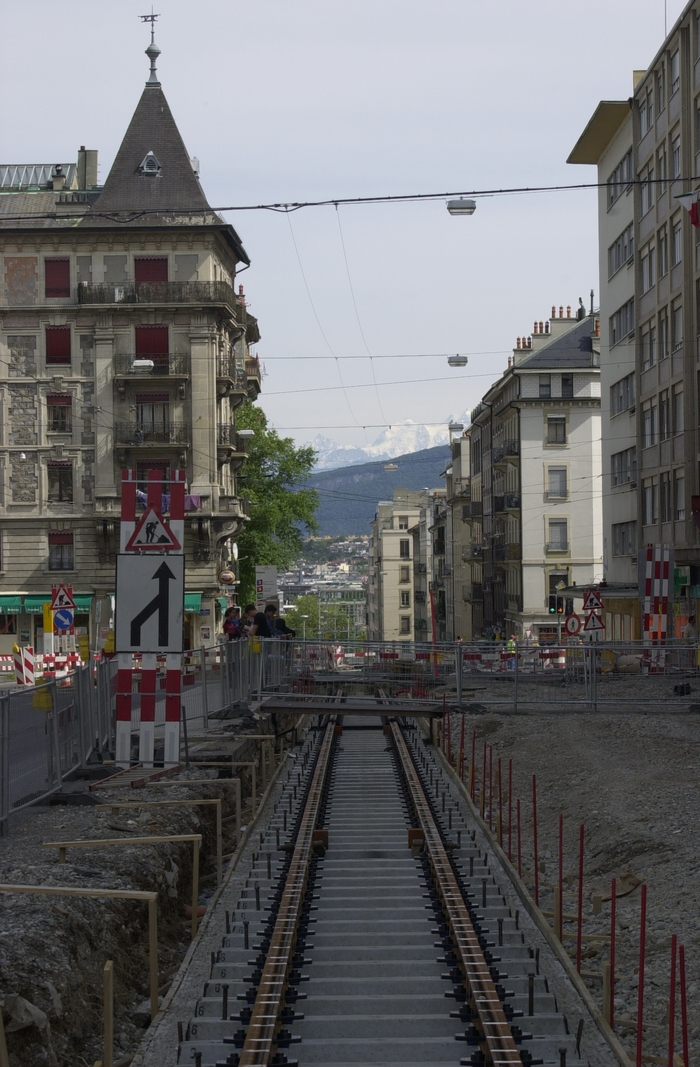
- Rue de la Servette
- Interactive map of Servette
- Coordinates: 46°12′44″N 6°07′51″E
- Country: Switzerland
- City: Geneva
- Website: www.geneve.ch/en/what-geneva/discover-geneva-districts/servette-petit-saconnex

Servette is a district of the city of Geneva, Switzerland. The district's name comes from the Latin word for forest, silva, and means "little forest". Its name alludes to Servette's rural past, before Geneva grew beyond its walls and incorporated the area. Many of Geneva professional sports teams are named after this neighbourhood; the two most famous examples are Genève-Servette HC and Servette FC.
