= Niklas Steffen =

Swissfootballer (born 2002)

Personal information
- Date of birth: 19 January 2001 (age 25)
- Place of birth: Solothurn, Switzerland
- Height: 1.87 m (6 ft 2 in)
- Position: Goalkeeper

Team information
- Current team: Thun
- Number: 1

Youth career
- 2006–2016: Solothurn
- 2016–2017: Basel

Senior career*
Years	Team	Apps	(Gls)
2017–2021	Basel U21	12	(0)
2021–2023	Stade Lausanne Ouchy	21	(0)
2023–2024	Rapperswil-Jona	33	(0)
2024–	Thun	59	(0)

International career
2016	Switzerland U15	1	(0)
2016–2017	Switzerland U16	4	(0)
2017	Switzerland U17	6	(0)
2018–2019	Switzerland U18	3	(0)
- * Club domestic league appearances and goals as of 28 September 2026

Niklas Steffen (born 19 January 2001) is a Swiss professional footballer who plays as a goalkeeper for Swiss Super League club Thun.

== Club career ==
Steffen is a product of the youth academies of the Swiss clubs Solothurn and Basel, and was promoted to Basel's U21s in 2017, signing his first contract with the club until 2021. On 2 April 2021, he moved to Stade Lausanne Ouchy. On 7 July 2023, he transferred to Rapperswil-Jona. On 12 June 2024, he transferred to Thun on a two-year contract. He was the starter as Thun went on to win the 2024–25 Swiss Challenge League and earned promotion to the Swiss Super League. On 20 December 2025, he extended his contract with Thun until 2028. The following season he helped them win their first ever first division title, the 2025–26 Swiss Super League.

== International career ==
Steffen was a youth international for Switzerland, having played for the Switzerland U18s in October 2018.

== Honours ==
Thun

- Swiss Super League: 2025–26
- Swiss Challenge League: 2024–25
