= Daniel Stendel =

German association football manager and former player

Personal information
- Date of birth: 4 April 1974 (age 52)
- Place of birth: Frankfurt an der Oder, East Germany
- Position: Striker

Team information
- Current team: Barnsley (Head Coach)

Youth career
- –1994: FFC Viktoria

Senior career*
Years	Team	Apps	(Gls)
1994–1997	Hamburger SV II		(35)
1995–1997	Hamburger SV	7	(0)
1997–1998	SV Meppen	34	(13)
1998–1999	FC Gütersloh	31	(5)
1999–2006	Hannover 96	180	(43)
2006–2007	FC St. Pauli	15	(2)
2007–2008	Hannover 96 II	19	(4)
Total		363	(102)

Managerial career
- 2016–2017: Hannover 96
- 2018–2019: Barnsley
- 2019–2020: Heart of Midlothian
- 2021: Nancy
- 2022–2026: Hannover 96 II
- 2026–: Barnsley
- * Club domestic league appearances and goals

Daniel Stendel (born 4 April 1974) is a German professional football manager and former player who is the head coach of EFL League One club Barnsley.

Stendel played as a striker in his native Germany, spending most of his playing career with Hannover 96, who he later managed. He then had a spell as manager of Barnsley, helping them win promotion to the Championship in his only full season before he was dismissed in October 2019. He was appointed manager of Scottish club Heart of Midlothian in December 2019. Hearts were relegated after the curtailed 2019–20 season, and in June 2020 Stendel was replaced as manager. In May 2021 he was appointed manager of Nancy, but was dismissed by the French club in September 2021.

== Coaching career ==
=== Hannover 96 ===
Parallel to his last as an active player, Stendel already worked as a co-coach at Hannover 96 II in the 2007-08 season. After his career ended a year later, he became coach of the U-17s; in 2013, he moved to the U-19s.

He was appointed head coach of Hannover 96 on 3 April 2016 for the remainder of the 2015–16 season. He had been coaching the under 19 team for Hannover. His first match finished in a 2–2 draw. His first win came in the following weekend, on 15 April 2016, in a 2–0 win against Borussia Mönchengladbach. He was sacked on 20 March 2017. He finished with a record of 17 wins, nine draws, and eight losses.

=== Barnsley ===
On 6 June 2018, Stendel was appointed as manager of League One club Barnsley on a two-year deal. On 13 April 2019, following a 4–2 home win over Fleetwood Town, South Yorkshire Police launched an investigation after opposition manager Joey Barton allegedly assaulted Stendel in the tunnel. After the incident, Barton was charged by South Yorkshire Police with ABH and bailed until 9 October 2019. At Sheffield Crown Court, in November 2021, Stendel said that he was shoved to the ground by Barton and fell into metal bars in the tunnel. On 6 December, Barton was found not guilty after a week-long trial.

On 8 October 2019, Stendel was sacked as manager of Barnsley, following a run of ten games without a win. Stendel's departure sparked widespread criticism of the board.

=== Heart of Midlothian ===
Stendel was appointed manager of Scottish club Hearts in December 2019, on a contract due to run until the summer of 2022. In March 2020, during the coronavirus pandemic, Scottish football was put on hold indefinitely. To help Hearts during this period, Stendel refused to take any wage payments. Hearts were bottom of the 2019–20 Scottish Premiership at the time the league was suspended, and were subsequently relegated when the league was curtailed. Stendel had a clause in his contract which meant that it was no longer in effect if Hearts were relegated from the Premiership, and the club appointed Robbie Neilson to replace him on 21 June 2020.

=== Nancy ===
On 20 May 2021, Stendel was appointed Manager of Nancy of France in Ligue 2 on an initial two-year contract. On 24 September 2021, Stendel was sacked from his role at the club following a 1–1 draw against a nine-man Amiens side, with the club at the bottom of the league table and with no wins in the opening ten games.

=== Hannover 96 II ===
In July 2022, Stendel returned to Hannover, as he was appointed manager of the clubs reserve team, Hannover 96 II.

=== Return to Barnsley ===
Following the parting of ways between Barnsley & Conor Hourihane at the end of the 25/26 season, in May 2026, it was confirmed that Daniel Stendel would return to England and return to Barnsley for a second spell. He signed a two year deal with the club.

== Managerial statistics ==
As of match played 20 November 2026

Managerial record by team and tenure
Team	From	To	Record					Ref.
Team	From	To	G	W	D	L	Win %	Ref.
Hannover 96	3 April 2016	19 March 2017	34	17	9	8	50.0	
Barnsley	6 June 2018	8 October 2019	66	31	18	17	47.0	
Heart of Midlothian	7 December 2019	21 June 2020	17	5	5	7	29.4	
Nancy	20 May 2021	24 September 2021	10	0	4	6	0.0	
Hannover 96 II	26 July 2022	12 May 2026	143	70	23	50	49.0	
Barnsley	12 May 2026	Present	21	5	5	11	23.8	
Total			291	128	64	99	44.0	
