= 2022–23 Professional U18 Development League =

U18 Premier League
- Season: 2022–23
- Champions: Manchester City U18s (4th Title)
- Matches: 289
- Goals: 1,176 (4.07 per match)
- Top goalscorer: (England) Justin Oboavwoduo Manchester City U18s (18 Goals)
- Biggest home win: Manchester City U18s 8–0 Wolverhampton Wanderers U18s (3 December 2022)
- Biggest away win: Chelsea U18s 1–7 Fulham U18s (26 November 2022); Norwich City U18s 1–7 Chelsea U18s (14 January 2023); Southampton U18s 1–7 Crystal Palace U18s (1 April 2023)
- Highest scoring: Newcastle United U18s 6–4 Leeds United U18s (28 January 2023)
- Longest winning run: 12 Matches – Manchester City U18s (7 January 2023 – 22 April 2023); West Ham United U18s (13 August 2022 – 14 January 2023)
- Longest unbeaten run: 16 Matches – Manchester City U18s (19 November 2022 – 22 April 2023)
- Longest winless run: 11 Matches – Leeds United U18s (9 November 2022 – 29 April 2023)
- Longest losing run: 9 Matches – Norwich City U18s (7 January 2023 – 1 April 2023)

The 2022–23 Professional U18 Development League was the 11th season of the Professional Development League system. There were 25 teams competing, divided into North and South divisions according to their region. Burnley U18s, Birmingham City U18s Did not return to the league after failing to retain category one academy status. Reading U18s left temporarily dropping to category 2 status. Manchester City U18s are two-time defending champions.

== North ==
Pos	Team	Pld	W	D	L	GF	GA	GD	Pts	
1	Manchester City U18s (C, Q)	24	18	3	3	81	23	+58	57	Qualification for the National Final
2	Sunderland U18s	24	17	2	5	63	30	+33	53	
3	Manchester United U18s	24	12	8	4	56	39	+17	44	
4	Everton U18s	24	8	9	7	43	41	+2	33	
5	Stoke City U18s	24	9	5	10	31	39	−8	32	
6	Liverpool U18s	24	9	4	11	55	54	+1	31	
7	Derby County U18s	24	8	7	9	48	47	+1	31	
8	Middlesbrough U18s	24	9	3	12	34	55	−21	30	
9	Nottingham Forest U18s	24	8	5	11	37	43	−6	29	
10	Blackburn Rovers U18s	24	8	2	14	37	56	−19	26	
11	Wolverhampton Wanderers U18s	24	7	5	12	31	54	−23	26	
12	Newcastle United U18s	24	6	6	12	42	54	−12	24	
13	Leeds United U18s	24	5	5	14	44	67	−23	20	

(C) Champions; (Q) Qualified for the phase indicated

== South ==
Pos	Team	Pld	W	D	L	GF	GA	GD	Pts	
1	West Ham United U18s (C, Q)	22	19	0	3	75	32	+43	57	Qualification for the National Final
2	Fulham U18s	22	12	4	6	70	39	+31	40	
3	Crystal Palace U18s	22	11	6	5	60	41	+19	39	
4	Chelsea U18s	22	11	4	7	54	42	+12	37	
5	Tottenham Hotspur U18s	22	11	3	8	51	45	+6	36	
6	Brighton & Hove Albion U18s	22	8	5	9	32	48	−16	29	
7	West Bromwich Albion U18s	22	6	6	10	32	42	−10	24	
8	Southampton U18s	22	7	3	12	45	58	−13	24	
9	Leicester City U18s	22	7	3	12	34	50	−16	24	
10	Aston Villa U18s	22	7	3	12	43	63	−20	24	
11	Arsenal U18s	22	6	5	11	43	51	−8	23	
12	Norwich City U18s	22	4	4	14	32	60	−28	16	

Source: Premier League Under 18 Table
(C) Champions; (Q) Qualified for the phase indicated

== National Final ==
10 May 2023
19:00

Manchester City U18s	2–1	West Ham United U18s
Oboavwoduo 76', 102'	Report	Kodua 29'

City of Manchester Stadium, Manchester
Referee: Alex Sawden

== Top goalscorers ==
As of 10 May 2023

Rank	Player	Club	Goals
1	(England) Justin Oboavwoduo	Manchester City U18s	18
2	(England) Aaron Loupalo-Bi	Fulham U18s	17
3	(Northern Ireland) Callum Marshall	West Ham United U18s	16
4	(Netherlands) Martin Sherif	Everton U18s	14
5	(England) Joel Ndala	Manchester City U18s	13
5	(England) Jake Waters	Sunderland U18s	13
7	(England) Gideon Kodua	West Ham United U18s	12
7	(Wales) Lewis Koumas	Liverpool U18s	12
7	(England) Amani Richards	Leicester City U18s	12
10	(Wales) Omari Benjamin	Arsenal U18s	11
10	(England) Lemar Gordon	Fulham U18s	11
10	(England) Zach Marsh	Crystal Palace U18s	11
10	(England) Donnell McNeilly	Chelsea U18s	11

== Hat-tricks ==
As of 10 May 2023

Player	For	Against	Result	Date	Ref.
(Northern Ireland) Callum Marshall	West Ham United U18s	Crystal Palace U18s	2–3 (A)	13 August 2022	
(Wales) Lewis Koumas^{4}	Liverpool U18s	Middlesbrough U18s	6–2 (H)	13 August 2022	
(England) Oliver Bainbridge	Sunderland U18s	Everton U18s	2–3 (A)	20 August 2022	
(England) Tom Watson	Sunderland U18s	Middlesbrough U18s	6–3 (H)	27 August 2022	
(Wales) Omari Benjamin	Arsenal U18s	Tottenham Hotspur U18s	4–1 (H)	27 August 2022	
(Scotland) Ben Andreucci	Leeds United U18s	Sunderland U18s	5–2 (H)	1 October 2022	
(England) Charlie Lutz	Aston Villa U18s	West Bromwich Albion U18s	3–3 (A)	22 October 2022	
(England) Alfie Harrison	Manchester City U18s	Blackburn Rovers U18s	5–0 (H)	29 October 2022	
(England) Detlef Esapa Osong	Nottingham Forest U18s	Wolverhampton Wanderers U18s	1–4 (A)	19 November 2022	
(England) Will Lankshear	Tottenham Hotspur U18s	West Ham United U18s	4–3 (A)	3 December 2022	
(England) Detlef Esapa Osong	Nottingham Forest U18s	Middlesbrough U18s	0–4 (A)	14 January 2023	
(England) Jaydan Davidson	Derby County U18s	Everton U18s	3–3 (H)	28 January 2023	
(Netherlands) Martin Sherif	Everton U18s	Derby County U18s	3–3 (A)	28 January 2023	
(Scotland) Johnny Emerson	Newcastle United U18s	Leeds United U18s	6–4 (H)	28 January 2023	
(England) Lemar Gordon	Fulham U18s	Southampton U18s	5–2 (H)	4 March 2023	
(Wales) Omari Benjamin	Arsenal U18s	West Bromwich Albion U18s	1–4 (A)	4 March 2023	
(England) Connor Brown	Nottingham Forest U18s	Blackburn Rovers U18s	2–4 (A)	18 March 2023	
(England) Zach Marsh	Crystal Palace U18s	Southampton U18s	1–7 (A)	1 April 2023	
(Honduras) Keyrol Figueroa	Liverpool U18s	Wolverhampton Wanderers U18s	3–0 (H)	1 April 2023	
(England) Lennon Wheeldon	Derby County U18s	Liverpool U18s	5–2 (H)	18 April 2023	
(England) Leon Chiwome	Wolverhampton Wanderers U18s	Leeds United U18s	5–2 (H)	22 April 2023	
(Scotland) Rory Wilson	Aston Villa U18s	Leicester City U18s	5–2 (H)	25 April 2023	
(England) Dominic Ballard	Southampton U18s	Arsenal U18s	5–1 (H)	5 May 2023	

Note

(H) – Home; (A) – Away
^{4} – player scored 4 goals

== Professional Development League 2 ==
U18 Professional Development League 2
- Season: 2022–23
- Champions: Barnsley U18s (1st title)
- Matches: 283 (280 RS, 3 PO)
- Goals: 1,117 (3.95 per match) (1,106 RS, 11 PO)
- Top goalscorer: (Republic of Ireland) Patrick Casey Charlton Athletic U18s (30 Goals)
- Biggest home win: Bristol City U18s 9–0 Hull City U18s (20 August 2022)
- Biggest away win: Ipswich Town U18s 1–7 Millwall U18s (7 January 2023)
- Highest scoring: Watford U18s 5–5 Millwall U18s (29 October 2022); Colchester United U18s 5–5 Swansea City U18s (26 November 2022); Swansea City U18s 7–3 Wigan Athletic U18s (29 April 2023)
- Longest winning run: 8 Matches – Peterborough United U18s (28 January 2023 – 25 March 2023)
- Longest unbeaten run: 14 Matches – Barnsley U18s (28 October 2022 – 11 March 2023)
- Longest winless run: 13 Matches – Birmingham City U18s (28 February 2023 – 5 May 2023); Watford U18s (25 February 2023 – 9 May 2023)
- Longest losing run: 7 Matches – Wigan Athletic U18s (25 March 2023 – 6 May 2023)

The 2022–23 Professional U18 Development League 2 was the 11th season of the Professional Development League system. 20 teams competed this season in the U18 Professional Development League 2. The 2022-23 Under-18 League 2, or Under-18s Professional Development League 2 as it is sometimes referred to, is Under-18 football's second tier, designed for those academies with Category 2 status. The league is split regionally into north and south divisions, with each team facing opponents in their own region twice both home and away and opponents in the other region once home or away. This results in both divisions playing 28 games. The sides finishing in the top two positions in both regions at the end of the season will progress to a knockout stage to determine the overall league champion. Burnley U18s, Birmingham City U18s returned to the league after failing to retain category one academy status. Reading U18s joined after temporarily dropping to category 2 status, but would leave after this season. Sheffield United U18s are the defending champions from the previous season.

== North Division ==
Pos	Team	Pld	W	D	L	GF	GA	GD	Pts	Qualification
1	Barnsley U18s	28	21	4	3	81	34	+47	67	Qualification for Knock-out stage
2	Sheffield United U18s	28	18	2	8	57	32	+25	56	Qualification for Knock-out stage
3	Peterborough United U18s	28	17	2	9	59	42	+17	53	
4	Sheffield Wednesday U18s	28	12	7	9	45	42	+3	43	
5	Crewe Alexandra U18s	28	10	8	10	50	45	+5	38	
6	Coventry City U18s	28	10	6	12	47	55	−8	36	
7	Burnley U18s	28	9	6	13	42	51	−9	33	
8	Hull City U18s	28	6	3	19	41	79	−38	21	
9	Birmingham City U18s	28	5	5	18	43	74	−31	20	
10	Wigan Athletic U18s	28	5	2	21	30	72	−42	17	

== South Division ==
Pos	Team	Pld	W	D	L	GF	GA	GD	Pts	Qualification
1	Charlton Athletic U18s	28	17	3	8	84	47	+37	54	Qualification for Knock-out stage
2	Millwall U18s	28	15	6	7	67	47	+20	51	Qualification for Knock-out stage
3	Cardiff City U18s	28	16	1	11	63	45	+18	49	
4	Bristol City U18s	28	15	3	10	73	51	+22	48	
5	Reading U18s	28	13	6	9	55	47	+8	45	
6	Swansea City U18s	28	12	6	10	61	66	−5	42	
7	Colchester United U18s	28	12	3	13	55	65	−10	39	
8	Ipswich Town U18s	28	10	3	15	58	74	−16	33	
9	Queens Park Rangers U18s	28	9	2	17	53	69	−16	29	
10	Watford U18s	28	7	4	17	42	69	−27	25	

== Knock-out stage ==
Semi-finals

12 May 2023

Charlton Athletic U18s	5–1	Sheffield United U18s
Anderson 10'; Casey 17', 44'; Kanu 21'; Huke 41'	Report	Haughton-Parris 38'

The Valley, London
Attendance: 397
13 May 2023

Barnsley U18s	1–0	Millwall U18s
Nzondo 90+2'

Oakwell, Barnsley

Professional Development League Two Play-Off Final

20 May 2023
12:00

Barnsley U18s	2–2 (a.e.t.)	Charlton Athletic U18s
Chapman 40' (pen.); Doyle 117'		Rylah 49'; Hobden 103'
Penalties
Pickard (penalty scored); Monteiro (penalty scored); Jalo (penalty scored); Farrell (penalty scored); Nzondo (penalty scored); James (penalty scored)	6–5	(penalty scored) Anderson; (penalty scored) Kanu; (penalty scored) Kedwell; (penalty scored) Bower; (penalty scored) Casey; (penalty missed) Enslin

Oakwell, Barnsley

== Top goalscorers ==
As of 20 May 2023

Rank	Player	Club	Goals
1	(Republic of Ireland) Patrick Casey	Charlton Athletic U18s	30
2	(Wales) Iwan Morgan	Swansea City U18s	24
3	(England) Henry Hearn	Millwall U18s	23
4	(Wales) Tanatswa Nyakuhwa	Cardiff City U18s	18
5	(England) Kurtis Havenhand	Sheffield United U18s	16
5	(England) Reuben Marshall	Peterborough United U18s	16
7	(England) Ryan Huke	Charlton Athletic U18s	14
8	(Montserrat) Josiah Dyer	Barnsley U18s	13
9	(Wales) Geoffroy Bony	Swansea City U18s	12
10	(England) Joe Westley	Burnley U18s	11
10	(England) Caylan Vickers	Reading U18s	11

== Hat-tricks ==
As of 20 May 2023

Player	For	Against	Result	Date	Ref.
(Republic of Ireland) Patrick Casey	Charlton Athletic U18s	Sheffield United U18s	3–0 (H)	20 August 2022	
(Guernsey) Tim ap Sion	Bristol City U18s	Hull City U18s	9–0 (H)	20 August 2022	
(England) Kai Enslin	Charlton Athletic U18s	Swansea City U18s	3–5 (A)	1 October 2022	
(Northern Ireland) Rio Oudnie-Morgan	Ipswich Town U18s	Swansea City U18s	5–0 (H)	15 October 2022	
(England) Henry Hearn^{4}	Millwall U18s	Colchester United U18s	2–7 (A)	15 October 2022	
(England) Trialist	Watford U18s	Queens Park Rangers U18s	5–2 (H)	22 October 2022	
(England) Henry Hearn	Millwall U18s	Charlton Athletic U18s	4–4 (H)	22 October 2022	
(England) Jaedyn Chibanga	Hull City U18s	Burnley U18s	3–4 (H)	29 October 2022	
(England) Joe Westley	Burnley U18s	Hull City U18s	3–4 (A)	29 October 2022	
(England) Michael Adu-Poku	Watford U18s	Millwall U18s	5–5 (H)	29 October 2022	
(England) Ryan Huke	Charlton Athletic U18s	Ipswich Town U18s	6–0 (H)	29 October 2022	
(Wales) Iwan Morgan^{4}	Swansea City U18s	Colchester United U18s	5–5 (A)	26 November 2022	
(England) Alex Anaman	Barnsley U18s	Peterborough United U18s	4–1 (H)	7 January 2023	
(Wales) Iwan Morgan	Swansea City U18s	Queens Park Rangers U18s	4–5 (A)	28 January 2023	
(England) Henry Hearn^{4}	Millwall U18s	Cardiff City U18s	0–4 (A)	11 February 2023	
(Wales) Tanatswa Nyakuhwa	Cardiff City U18s	Swansea City U18s	1–4 (A)	25 February 2023	
(Wales) Calum Agius	Crewe Alexandra U18s	Hull City U18s	7–2 (H)	4 March 2023	
(Wales) Trey George	Cardiff City U18s	Sheffield Wednesday U18s	7–2 (H)	7 March 2023	
(Wales) Geoffroy Bony	Swansea City U18s	Watford U18s	7–2 (H)	11 March 2023	
(Wales) Calum Agius	Crewe Alexandra U18s	Wigan Athletic U18s	7–1 (H)	11 March 2023	
(Republic of Ireland) Patrick Casey^{4}	Charlton Athletic U18s	Hull City U18s	5–2 (H)	18 March 2023	
(Montserrat) Josiah Dyer	Barnsley U18s	Colchester United U18s	0–3 (A)	25 March 2023	
(England) Stafford Clarke	Sheffield United U18s	Watford U18s	1–4 (A)	22 April 2023	
(Wales) Iwan Morgan	Swansea City U18s	Ipswich Town U18s	5–3 (H)	25 April 2023	
(England) Chuks Uzor	Ipswich Town U18s	Swansea City U18s	5–3 (A)	25 April 2023	
(Republic of Ireland) Patrick Casey	Charlton Athletic U18s	Coventry City U18s	4–1 (H)	29 April 2023	
(Wales) Iwan Morgan^{4}	Swansea City U18s	Wigan Athletic U18s	7–3 (H)	29 April 2023	
(England) Harrison Bettoni	Wigan Athletic U18s	Swansea City U18s	7–3 (A)	29 April 2023	
(England) Tom Taylor	Ipswich Town U18s	Watford U18s	2–6 (A)	9 May 2023	

Note

(H) – Home; (A) – Away
^{4} – player scored 4 goals

== EFL Youth Alliance ==
Football League Youth Alliance
- Season: 2022-23
- Champions: North-East Division; Harrogate Town U18s; North-West Division; Blackpool U18s; South-East Division; Luton Town U18s; South-West Division; AFC Bournemouth U18s; Merit League One; Luton Town U18s; Merit League Two; Northampton Town U18s; North-East Division Championship Group Round; Bradford City U18s; North-East Division Lower Table Round; Mansfield Town U18s
- Matches: 619
- Goals: 2,375 (3.84 per match)
- Longest winless run: 20 Rotherham United U18s

The EFL Youth Alliance also known as League 3 is run by the Football League under the auspices of the Football League Youth Alliance. This league is where the Category 3 and 4 Academies play. 46 teams competed this season, 2 more than the previous season. Hartlepool United U18s returned after a 3-year absence. Stockport County U18s arrived after being promoted to the football league as a Category 3 Academy for the very first time. Brentford U18s arrived after they reopened their academy for the first time since 2016 as a Category 4 Academy. However, for unknown reasons Tranmere Rovers U18s left the league. For clubs that get relegated to the National League, they have two years to gain promotion back to the EFL. Otherwise, they lose their license with the League.

== League stage ==
As of match played 6 May 2023

== North-East Division ==
Pos	Team	Pld	W	D	L	GF	GA	GD	Pts	Qualification
1	Harrogate Town U18s (C)	20	14	3	3	40	16	+24	45	Northeast Division Championship Round
2	Bradford City U18s	20	13	2	5	56	27	+29	41	Northeast Division Championship Round
3	Grimsby Town U18s	20	11	3	6	41	35	+6	36	Northeast Division Championship Round
4	Doncaster Rovers U18s	20	11	3	6	40	39	+1	36	Northeast Division Championship Round
5	Burton Albion U18s	20	10	2	8	45	32	+13	32	Northeast Division Championship Round
6	Lincoln City U18s	20	8	5	7	56	51	+5	29	Northeast Division Championship Round
7	Scunthorpe United U18s	20	7	5	8	33	30	+3	26	Northeast Division Lower Round
8	Mansfield Town U18s	20	7	5	8	38	40	−2	26	Northeast Division Lower Round
9	Huddersfield Town U18s	20	7	1	12	36	52	−16	22	Northeast Division Lower Round
10	Hartlepool United U18s	20	4	2	14	14	48	−34	14	Northeast Division Lower Round
11	Rotherham United U18s	20	0	5	15	24	53	−29	5	Northeast Division Lower Round

Source: soccerway.com
(C) Champions

== North-West Division ==
Pos	Team	Pld	W	D	L	GF	GA	GD	Pts
1	Blackpool U18s (C)	26	16	5	5	51	30	+21	53
2	Accrington Stanley U18s	26	15	3	8	76	46	+30	48
3	Fleetwood Town U18s	26	13	5	8	55	44	+11	44
4	Salford City U18s	26	13	4	9	58	45	+13	43
5	Oldham Athletic U18s	26	12	7	7	63	56	+7	43
6	Bolton Wanderers U18s	26	12	6	8	49	36	+13	42
7	Carlisle United U18s	26	12	5	9	46	46	0	41
8	Shrewsbury Town U18s	26	10	7	9	38	40	−2	37
9	Rochdale U18s	26	10	5	11	47	45	+2	35
10	Preston North End U18s	26	11	1	14	65	50	+15	34
11	Stockport County U18s	26	7	7	12	37	54	−17	28
12	Morecambe U18s	26	8	3	15	46	62	−16	27
13	Port Vale U18s	26	6	5	15	44	66	−22	23
14	Walsall U18s	26	3	5	18	28	83	−55	14

Source: soccerway.com
(C) Champions

== South-East Division ==
Pos	Team	Pld	W	D	L	GF	GA	GD	Pts	Qualification
1	Luton Town U18s (C)	20	18	0	2	84	12	+72	54	Merit League One
2	AFC Wimbledon U18s	20	13	3	4	50	25	+25	42	Merit League One
3	Stevenage U18s	20	11	3	6	44	35	+9	36	Merit League One
4	Gillingham U18s	20	10	3	7	42	36	+6	33	Merit League One
5	Sutton United U18s	20	8	4	8	31	39	−8	28	Merit League One
6	Cambridge United U18s	20	7	2	11	36	37	−1	23	Merit League One
7	Southend United U18s	20	7	2	11	31	60	−29	23	Merit League Two
8	Brentford U18s	20	7	1	12	27	50	−23	22	Merit League Two
9	Northampton Town U18s	20	5	6	9	28	35	−7	21	Merit League Two
10	Milton Keynes Dons U18s	20	7	0	13	29	51	−22	21	Merit League Two
11	Leyton Orient U18s	20	4	2	14	20	42	−22	14	Merit League Two

Source: soccerway.com
(C) Champions

== South-West Division ==
Pos	Team	Pld	W	D	L	GF	GA	GD	Pts	Qualification
1	AFC Bournemouth U18s (C)	18	13	3	2	44	22	+22	42	Merit League One
2	Plymouth Argyle U18s	18	12	4	2	52	17	+35	40	Merit League One
3	Portsmouth U18s	18	11	3	4	44	27	+17	36	Merit League One
4	Oxford United U18s	18	8	5	5	40	27	+13	29	Merit League One
5	Swindon Town U18s	18	9	1	8	34	42	−8	28	Merit League One
6	Exeter City U18s	18	6	6	6	37	39	−2	24	Merit League Two
7	Newport County U18s	18	4	3	11	31	48	−17	15	Merit League Two
8	Bristol Rovers U18s	18	3	5	10	22	40	−18	14	Merit League Two
9	Cheltenham Town U18s	18	3	5	10	25	44	−19	14	Merit League Two
10	Forest Green Rovers U18s	18	2	3	13	17	40	−23	9	Merit League Two

Source: soccerway.com
(C) Champions

== Merit League Stage ==
The teams in the Southeast and Southwest Divisions played another 9 or 10 games to determine the champions of Merit League One and Merit League Two.

== Merit League One ==
Pos	Team	Pld	W	D	L	GF	GA	GD	Pts
1	Luton Town U18s (C)	10	6	3	1	21	11	+10	21
2	Swindon Town U18s	10	6	2	2	24	18	+6	20
3	Gillingham U18s	10	5	2	3	22	19	+3	17
4	Portsmouth U18s	10	5	1	4	18	12	+6	16
5	Stevenage U18s	10	3	3	4	19	14	+5	12
6	Plymouth Argyle U18s	10	2	6	2	19	15	+4	12
7	AFC Wimbledon U18s	10	3	3	4	18	20	−2	12
8	AFC Bournemouth U18s	9	4	0	5	21	27	−6	12
9	Cambridge United U18s	10	3	1	6	18	24	−6	10
10	Oxford United U18s	9	3	1	5	12	22	−10	10
11	Sutton United U18s	10	2	2	6	7	17	−10	8

Source: soccerway.com
(C) Champions

== Merit League Two ==
Pos	Team	Pld	W	D	L	GF	GA	GD	Pts
1	Northampton Town U18s (C)	9	6	3	0	24	10	+14	21
2	Bristol Rovers U18s	9	5	2	2	19	13	+6	17
3	Leyton Orient U18s	9	3	4	2	18	21	−3	13
4	Exeter City U18s	9	3	3	3	24	18	+6	12
5	Brentford U18s	9	3	3	3	19	21	−2	12
6	Milton Keynes Dons U18s	9	3	2	4	18	16	+2	11
7	Newport County U18s	9	3	2	4	26	31	−5	11
8	Forest Green Rovers U18s	9	3	1	5	12	16	−4	10
9	Cheltenham Town U18s	9	1	6	2	16	16	0	9
10	Southend United U18s	9	1	2	6	21	35	−14	5

Source: soccerway.com
(C) Champions

== Northeast Division 2nd Phase ==
Only 4 games were played but they were added in the regular season averages.

== North-East Merit Championship Group ==
These games include the regular season matches.

Pos	Team	Pld	W	D	L	GF	GA	GD	Pts
1	Bradford City U18s (C)	25	16	4	5	67	31	+36	52
2	Harrogate Town U18s	25	15	6	4	47	23	+24	51
3	Doncaster Rovers U18s	25	12	6	7	47	47	0	42
4	Burton Albion U18s	25	13	2	10	52	38	+14	41
5	Grimsby Town U18s	25	12	4	9	48	44	+4	40
6	Lincoln City U18s	25	9	6	10	62	62	0	33

Source: soccerway.com
(C) Champions

== North-East Division Lower Table Round ==
Pos	Team	Pld	W	D	L	GF	GA	GD	Pts
1	Mansfield Town U18s (C)	24	10	5	9	51	49	+2	35
2	Scunthorpe United U18s	24	9	6	9	41	36	+5	33
3	Huddersfield Town U18s	24	8	1	15	40	61	−21	25
4	Hartlepool United U18s	24	4	4	16	21	58	−37	16
5	Rotherham United U18s	24	2	6	16	32	59	−27	12

Source: soccerway.com
(C) Champions

== See also ==
- 2022–23 in English football
