= 2023–24 EFL Cup =

64th season of the EFL Cup

Carabao Cup
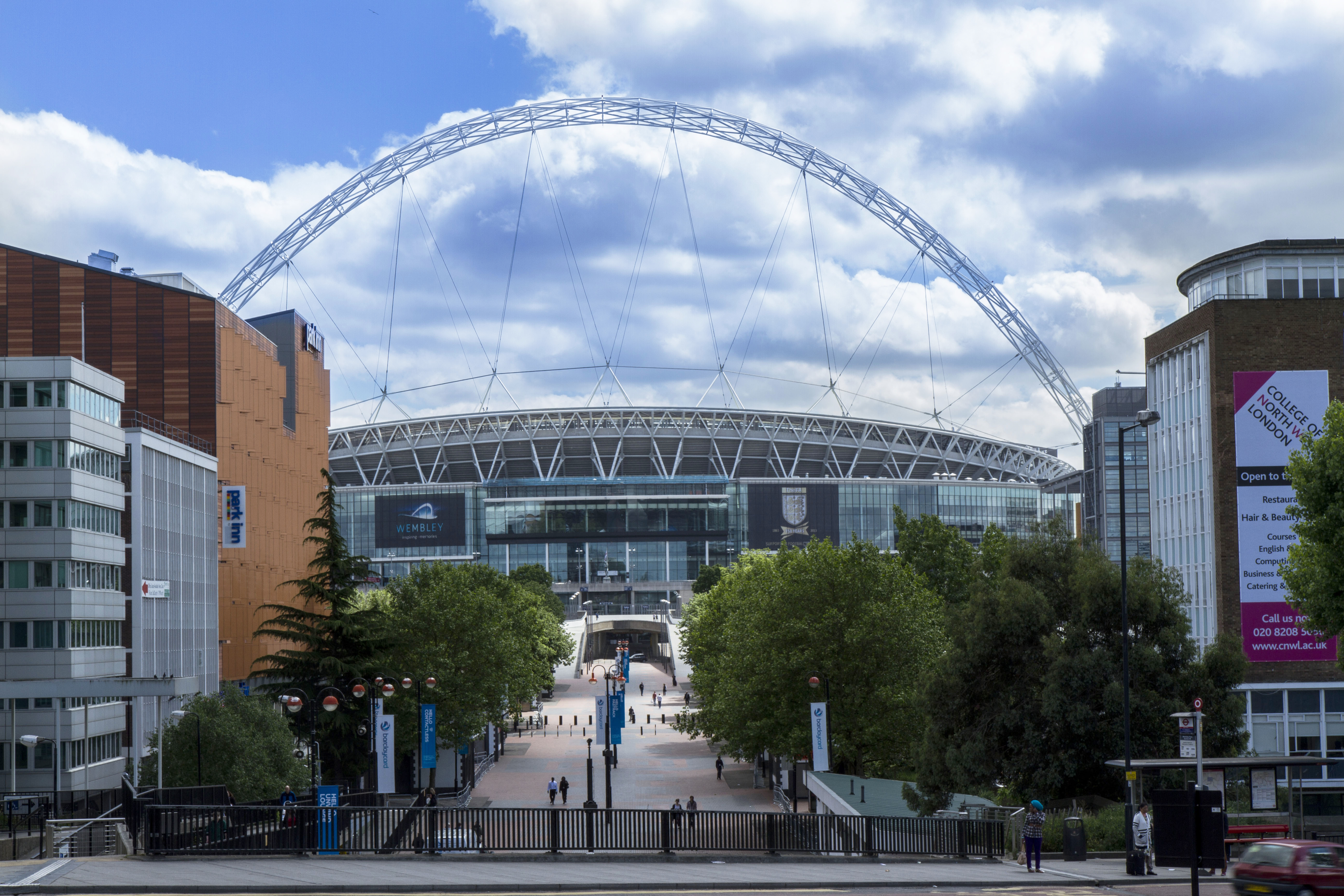
- Wembley Stadium hosted the final

Tournament details
- Country: England; Wales
- Dates: 8 August 2023 – 25 February 2024
- Teams: 92

Final positions
- Champions: Liverpool (10th title)
- Runners-up: Chelsea

Tournament statistics
- Matches played: 93
- Goals scored: 322 (3.46 per match)
- Attendance: 1,472,810 (15,837 per match)
- Top goal scorer(s): Morgan Rogers (5 goals)

The 2023–24 EFL Cup was the 64th season of the EFL Cup (known as the Carabao Cup for sponsorship reasons). The competition was open to all clubs participating in the Premier League and the English Football League.

The winner of the competition qualified for the play-off round of the 2024–25 UEFA Conference League. However, as champions Liverpool qualified for the UEFA Champions League that season, the spot for the Conference League play-offs was passed down to runners-up Chelsea, who finished 6th in the 2023–24 Premier League and had not qualified for any UEFA competition beforehand.

Manchester United were the defending champions, but were eliminated by Newcastle United, whom they had beaten in the previous season's final, in the fourth round.

The final was played at Wembley Stadium on 25 February 2024 between Liverpool and Chelsea. Liverpool secured a record-extending tenth title following a 1–0 win after extra time, courtesy of club captain Virgil van Dijk's late header.

== Access ==
All 92 clubs in the Premier League and English Football League entered the season's EFL Cup.

In the first round, all Championship, League One and League Two clubs entered.

The following round, the Premier League clubs not involved in the Champions League, Europa League or Europa Conference League entered.

	Clubs entering in this round	Clubs advancing from previous round	Number of games	Main date
First round (72 clubs)	24 clubs from EFL League Two; 24 clubs from EFL League One; 24 clubs from EFL Championship	N/A	36	8 August 2023
Second round (48 clubs)	12 Premier League clubs (not involved in European competition)	36 winners from first round	24	29 August 2023
Third round (32 clubs)	8 Premier League clubs (involved in European competition)	24 winners from second round	16	27 September 2023
Fourth round (16 clubs)	No clubs enter the fourth round	16 winners from third round	8	1 November 2023
Quarter-finals (8 clubs)	No clubs enter the quarter-finals	8 winners from fourth round	4	19 December 2023
Semi-finals (4 clubs)	No clubs enter the semi-finals	4 winners from quarter-finals	4 (two-legged)	9 January 2024; 23 January 2024
Final (2 clubs)	No clubs enter the final	2 winners from semi-finals	1	25 February 2024

== First round ==
A total of 72 clubs played in the first round: the 24 clubs from League Two the 24 clubs from League One and the 24 clubs from the Championship entered at this stage. The draw for this round was split on a geographical basis into "northern" and "southern" sections. Teams were drawn against a team from the same section.

Number of teams per tier still in the competition
Premier League (Note: Premier League teams joined the competition in the second and third rounds.)	Championship	League One	League Two	Total
20 / 20	24 / 24	24 / 24	24 / 24	92 / 92

=== Northern section ===
8 August 2023	Huddersfield Town (2)	2–3	Middlesbrough (2)	Huddersfield
19:00 BST	Harratt 4'; Hudlin 90+4'	Report	Silvera 20'; I. Jones 63'; McGree 82'	Stadium: Kirklees Stadium; Attendance: 8,057; Referee: Oliver Langford

8 August 2023	Mansfield Town (4)	2–0	Grimsby Town (4)	Mansfield
19:30 BST	Akins 28' (pen.); Oates 55'	Report		Stadium: Field Mill; Attendance: 3,123; Referee: Scott Jackson

8 August 2023	Accrington Stanley (4)	1–1 (1–4 p)	Bradford City (4)	Accrington
19:45 BST	Andrews 66'	Report	Pattison 45+1'	Stadium: Crown Ground; Attendance: 2,368; Referee: Martin Coy
	Penalties
	Leigh (penalty scored); Nolan (penalty missed); Adedoyin (penalty missed)		(penalty scored) Cook; (penalty scored) Gilliead; (penalty scored) Walker; (penalty scored) Oduor

8 August 2023	Barnsley (3)	2–2 (6–7 p)	Tranmere Rovers (4)	Barnsley
19:45 BST	Kane 45+3'; Marsh 90+8'	Report	Norris 23'; Taylor 47'	Stadium: Oakwell; Attendance: 4,343; Referee: Thomas Kirk
	Penalties
	Marsh (penalty missed); Jaló (penalty scored); Chapman (penalty scored); Nejman (penalty scored); Cotter (penalty scored); Łopata (penalty scored); Killip (penalty scored); Shepherd (penalty missed)		(penalty scored) Hawkes; (penalty scored) Jennings; (penalty scored) Hemmings; (penalty missed) Hendry; (penalty scored) McAlear; (penalty scored) Saunders; (penalty scored) Leake; (penalty scored) Lewis

8 August 2023	Blackburn Rovers (2)	4–3	Walsall (4)	Blackburn
19:45 BST	Gilsenan 21'; Ennis 40'; Garrett 50'; Buckley 67'	Report	McEntee 19'; Tierney 37'; Maher 84'	Stadium: Ewood Park; Attendance: 6,173; Referee: Ben Speedie

8 August 2023	Bolton Wanderers (3)	1–0	Barrow (4)	Horwich
19:45 BST	Ashworth 44'	Report		Stadium: Toughsheet Community Stadium; Attendance: 4,871; Referee: Anthony Backhouse

8 August 2023	Derby County (3)	0–2	Blackpool (3)	Derby
19:45 BST		Report	Beesley 7', 32'	Stadium: Pride Park Stadium; Attendance: 7,033; Referee: Jeremy Simpson

8 August 2023	Harrogate Town (4)	1–0	Carlisle United (3)	Harrogate
19:45 BST	Folarin 23'	Report		Stadium: Wetherby Road; Attendance: 2,177; Referee: Matthew Corlett

8 August 2023	Hull City (2)	1–2	Doncaster Rovers (4)	Kingston upon Hull
19:45 BST	Estupiñán 3'	Report	Miller 15', 61'	Stadium: MKM Stadium; Attendance: 6,577; Referee: Simon Mather

8 August 2023	Notts County (4)	0–2	Lincoln City (3)	Nottingham
19:45 BST		Report	Roughan 23'; Sørensen 48'	Stadium: Meadow Lane; Attendance: 6,468; Referee: Martin Woods

8 August 2023	Port Vale (3)	3–2	Fleetwood Town (3)	Stoke-on-Trent
19:45 BST	Chislett 18', 72'; Thomas 58'	Report	Hayes 5'; Graydon 47'	Stadium: Vale Park; Attendance: 2,743; Referee: Edward Duckworth

8 August 2023	Preston North End (2)	2–2 (2–4 p)	Salford City (4)	Preston
19:45 BST	Woodburn 44'; Holmes 50'	Report	McLennan 5', 38'	Stadium: Deepdale; Attendance: 6,790; Referee: Tom Reeves
	Penalties
	Ledson (penalty missed); Keane (penalty scored); Best (penalty scored); Frøkjær-Jensen (penalty missed)		(penalty scored) Smith; (penalty scored) McAleny; (penalty scored) Mallan; (penalty scored) Garbutt

8 August 2023	Rotherham United (2)	1–1 (4–2 p)	Morecambe (4)	Rotherham
19:45 BST	Kayode 37'	Report	Mellon 22'	Stadium: New York Stadium; Attendance: 2,834; Referee: Thomas Parsons
	Penalties
	Hugill (penalty scored); Rathbone (penalty scored); Blackett (penalty scored); Onyedinma (penalty scored)		(penalty scored) McKiernan; (penalty scored) Davenport; (penalty missed) Brown; (penalty missed) Taylor

8 August 2023	Sheffield Wednesday (2)	1–1 (4–1 p)	Stockport County (4)	Sheffield
19:45 BST	Bakinson 90+7'	Report	Madden 16'	Stadium: Hillsborough Stadium; Attendance: 10,886; Referee: Lewis Smith
	Penalties
	Windass (penalty scored); Paterson (penalty scored); Bannan (penalty scored); Gregory (penalty scored)		(penalty missed) Madden; (penalty scored) Rydel; (penalty missed) Barry

8 August 2023	Stoke City (2)	2–1	West Bromwich Albion (2)	Stoke-on-Trent
19:45 BST	Griffiths 27' (o.g.); Vidigal 65'	Report	Thomas-Asante 64'	Stadium: Bet365 Stadium; Attendance: 10,583; Referee: Geoff Eltringham

8 August 2023	Sunderland (2)	1–1 (3–5 p)	Crewe Alexandra (4)	Sunderland
19:45 BST	Rigg 64'	Report	Offord 45+1'	Stadium: Stadium of Light; Attendance: 10,763; Referee: Scott Oldham
	Penalties
	Dack (penalty scored); Pritchard (penalty scored); Ekwah (penalty missed); Triantis (penalty scored)		(penalty scored) Nevitt; (penalty scored) Long; (penalty scored) Adebisi; (penalty scored) Tabiner; (penalty scored) Cooney

8 August 2023	Wrexham (4)	0–0 (4–2 p)	Wigan Athletic (3)	Wrexham
20:00 BST		Report		Stadium: Racecourse Ground; Attendance: 9,736; Referee: Sam Allison
	Penalties
	Young (penalty scored); Lee (penalty scored); O'Connor (penalty scored); Dalby (penalty scored)		(penalty scored) Wyke; (penalty scored) Humphrys; (penalty missed) Hughes; (penalty missed) Aasgaard

9 August 2023	Leeds United (2)	2–1	Shrewsbury Town (3)	Leeds
19:45 BST	Gelhardt 52'; Struijk 58'	Report	Perry 28'	Stadium: Elland Road; Attendance: 35,129; Referee: Seb Stockbridge

9 August 2023	Burton Albion (3)	0–2	Leicester City (2)	Burton upon Trent
20:00 BST		Report	Iheanacho 6'; Ndidi 45+2'	Stadium: Pirelli Stadium; Attendance: 4,631; Referee: Gavin Ward

=== Southern section ===
8 August 2023	Newport County (4)	3–1	Charlton Athletic (3)	Newport
19:30 BST	Wildig 63'; Evans 76'; Palmer-Houlden 80'	Report	Kanu 43'	Stadium: Rodney Parade; Attendance: 2,600; Referee: Scott Simpson

8 August 2023	Peterborough United (3)	1–1 (4–1 p)	Swindon Town (4)	Peterborough
19:30 BST	Randall 7'	Report	Hepburn-Murphy 49'	Stadium: London Road Stadium; Attendance: 3,440; Referee: Tom Nield
	Penalties
	Clarke-Harris (penalty scored); Edwards (penalty scored); Tomlinson (penalty scored); Burrows (penalty scored)		(penalty missed) Blake-Tracy; (penalty scored) Kemp; (penalty missed) Young

8 August 2023	Swansea City (2)	3–0	Northampton Town (3)	Swansea
19:30 BST	Piroe 10', 53'; Ginnelly 90+4'	Report		Stadium: Swansea.com Stadium; Attendance: 6,923; Referee: Peter Wright

8 August 2023	Cheltenham Town (3)	0–2	Birmingham City (2)	Cheltenham
19:45 BST		Report	Bacuna 24', 32'	Stadium: Whaddon Road; Attendance: 4,026; Referee: Craig Hicks

8 August 2023	Exeter City (3)	2–1	Crawley Town (4)	Exeter
19:45 BST	Taylor 73'; Scott 84'	Report	Lolos 15'	Stadium: St James Park; Attendance: 3,560; Referee: Christopher Pollard

8 August 2023	Forest Green Rovers (4)	1–3	Portsmouth (3)	Nailsworth
19:45 BST	Omotoye 24'	Report	Yengi 30', 75' (pen.); Swanson 52'	Stadium: The New Lawn; Attendance: 1,868; Referee: Sam Purkiss

8 August 2023	Gillingham (4)	3–1	Southampton (2)	Gillingham
19:45 BST	Nadesan 12'; McKenzie 51', 67'	Report	Alcaraz 89'	Stadium: Priestfield Stadium; Attendance: 7,775; Referee: Carl Brook

8 August 2023	Millwall (2)	0–4	Reading (3)	Bermondsey
19:45 BST		Report	Ehibhatiomhan 1', 51'; Savage 67'; Camará 88'	Stadium: The Den; Attendance: 4,738; Referee: Leigh Doughty

8 August 2023	Milton Keynes Dons (4)	0–2	Wycombe Wanderers (3)	Bletchley
19:45 BST		Report	Hanlan 73'; Forino-Joseph 82'	Stadium: Stadium MK; Attendance: 2,946; Referee: James Bell

8 August 2023	Plymouth Argyle (2)	2–0	Leyton Orient (3)	Plymouth
19:45 BST	Waine 25', 38'	Report		Stadium: Home Park; Attendance: 10,324; Referee: Sunny Sukhvir Gill

8 August 2023	Stevenage (3)	1–1 (4–3 p)	Watford (2)	Stevenage
19:45 BST	March 43'	Report	Bayo 6'	Stadium: Broadhall Way; Attendance: 4,495; Referee: Charles Breakspear
	Penalties
	Reid (penalty missed); Roberts (penalty scored); Forster-Caskey (penalty scored); MacDonald (penalty scored); N. Thompson (penalty scored)		(penalty scored) Hoedt; (penalty scored) Sierralta; (penalty missed) Porteous; (penalty missed) Healey; (penalty scored) Koné

8 August 2023	Sutton United (4)	2–2 (6–5 p)	Cambridge United (3)	Sutton
19:45 BST	Smith 38'; Beautyman 82' (pen.)	Report	Okenabirhie 18', 60' (pen.)	Stadium: Gander Green Lane; Attendance: 1,761; Referee: Daniel Middleton
	Penalties
	Eastmond (penalty scored); Angol (penalty scored); Milsom (penalty scored); Goodliffe (penalty missed); Kashket (penalty scored); Patrick (penalty scored); O'Brien (penalty scored)		(penalty scored) Ahadme; (penalty scored) Lankester; (penalty scored) Andrew; (penalty missed) Thomas; (penalty scored) Digby; (penalty scored) Janneh; (penalty missed) Dunk

9 August 2023	AFC Wimbledon (4)	2–1	Coventry City (2)	Wimbledon
19:45 BST	Bugiel 86'; McLean 90+2'	Report	Godden 17' (pen.)	Stadium: Plough Lane; Attendance: 4,781; Referee: Andrew Kitchen

9 August 2023	Bristol City (2)	5–1	Oxford United (3)	Bristol
19:45 BST	Cornick 15'; Knight 35', 47'; Wells 51'; Naismith 62'	Report	Bodin 30'	Stadium: Ashton Gate; Attendance: 9,661; Referee: Ollie Yates

9 August 2023	Cardiff City (2)	2–2 (3–0 p)	Colchester United (4)	Cardiff
19:45 BST	R. Colwill 19'; Etete 35'	Report	Akinde 40'; Taylor 44'	Stadium: Cardiff City Stadium; Attendance: 5,158; Referee: Will Finnie
	Penalties
	R. Colwill (penalty missed); Romeo (penalty scored); Ojo (penalty scored); Ugbo (penalty scored)		(penalty missed) Fevrier; (penalty missed) Tchamadeu; (penalty missed) Hopper

9 August 2023	Ipswich Town (2)	2–0	Bristol Rovers (3)	Ipswich
19:45 BST	Taylor 12'; Aluko 76'	Report		Stadium: Portman Road; Attendance: 15,047; Referee: David Rock

16 August 2023	Queens Park Rangers (2)	0–1	Norwich City (2)	Shepherd's Bush
19:45 BST		Report	Rowe 90+9'	Stadium: Loftus Road; Attendance: 7,813; Referee: James Linington

== Second round ==
A total of 48 clubs played in the second round: the 12 Premier League clubs not involved in European competition entered at this stage along with the 36 winners from the first round. The draw for this round was split on a geographical basis into "northern" and "southern" sections. Teams were drawn against a team from the same section.

Number of teams per tier still in the competition
Premier League	Championship	League One	League Two	Total
20 / 20	14 / 24	10 / 24	12 / 24	56 / 92

=== Northern section ===
29 August 2023	Bolton Wanderers (3)	1–3	Middlesbrough (2)	Horwich
19:45 BST	Charles 23'	Report	Crooks 33'; McGree 90+1'; Rogers 90+4'	Stadium: Toughsheet Community Stadium; Attendance: 8,624; Referee: Stephen Martin

29 August 2023	Port Vale (3)	0–0 (2–0 p)	Crewe Alexandra (4)	Stoke-on-Trent
19:45 BST		Report		Stadium: Vale Park; Attendance: 6,375; Referee: Seb Stockbridge
	Penalties
	Wilson (penalty scored); Arblaster (penalty scored); Sang (penalty missed)		(penalty missed) Nevitt; (penalty missed) Long; (penalty missed) Adebisi; (penalty missed) Tabiner

29 August 2023	Salford City (4)	1–1 (9–8 p)	Leeds United (2)	Salford
20:00 BST	Smith 34'	Report	Struijk 76'	Stadium: Moor Lane; Attendance: 3,147; Referee: Oliver Langford
	Penalties
	Mallan (penalty scored); McAleny (penalty scored); Watson (penalty scored); Dackers (penalty scored); McLennan (penalty missed); Lund (penalty scored); Bolton (penalty scored); Mariappa (penalty scored); Tilt (penalty scored); Ashley (penalty scored)		(penalty scored) Greenwood; (penalty scored) Struijk; (penalty missed) Rutter; (penalty scored) Gnonto; (penalty scored) Sinisterra; (penalty scored) Hjelde; (penalty scored) Cresswell; (penalty scored) Ampadu; (penalty scored) Summerville; (penalty missed) Shackleton

29 August 2023	Sheffield Wednesday (2)	1–1 (4–5 p)	Mansfield Town (4)	Sheffield
19:45 BST	Musaba 28'	Report	Oates 85'	Stadium: Hillsborough Stadium; Attendance: 10,724; Referee: Sunny Sukhvir Gill
	Penalties
	Smith (penalty scored); Windass (penalty scored); Bannan (penalty scored); Vaulks (penalty missed); Gregory (penalty scored); Palmer (penalty missed)		(penalty scored) Bowery; (penalty scored) Maris; (penalty scored) Keillor-Dunn; (penalty missed) Swan; (penalty scored) Oates; (penalty scored) Flint

29 August 2023	Stoke City (2)	6–1	Rotherham United (2)	Stoke-on-Trent
19:45 BST	Burger 2'; Mmaee 18'; Laurent 29', 55'; Campbell 43'; Léris 72'	Report	Morrison 22'	Stadium: Bet365 Stadium; Attendance: 9,410; Referee: Michael Salisbury

29 August 2023	Tranmere Rovers (4)	0–2	Leicester City (2)	Birkenhead
19:45 BST		Report	Ndidi 55'; Vardy 59'	Stadium: Prenton Park; Attendance: 6,610; Referee: Ben Toner

29 August 2023	Wolverhampton Wanderers (1)	5–0	Blackpool (3)	Wolverhampton
19:45 BST	Kalajdžić 10'; Silva 25'; Doherty 60', 66'; Fraser 84'	Report		Stadium: Molineux Stadium; Attendance: 20,605; Referee: Jarred Gillett

29 August 2023	Wrexham (4)	1–1 (3–4 p)	Bradford City (4)	Wrexham
19:45 BST	Boyle 72'	Report	Smith 3' (pen.)	Stadium: Racecourse Ground; Attendance: 9,816; Referee: Ben Speedie
	Penalties
	Young (penalty missed); Lee (penalty scored); Palmer (penalty scored); McClean (penalty scored); Jones (penalty missed)		(penalty scored) Derbyshire; (penalty scored) Smallwood; (penalty scored) Wilson; (penalty scored) Halliday; (penalty missed) Oyegoke

30 August 2023	Doncaster Rovers (4)	1–2	Everton (1)	Doncaster
20:00 BST	Ironside 44'	Report	Beto 73'; Danjuma 88'	Stadium: Eco-Power Stadium; Attendance: 11,430; Referee: Tom Reeves

30 August 2023	Harrogate Town (4)	0–8	Blackburn Rovers (2)	Harrogate
19:45 BST		Report	Garrett 10'; Gallagher 13'; Buckley 34', 52' (pen.); Markanday 45+1'; Gilsenan 67'; Bloxham 72'; Edmondson 75'	Stadium: Wetherby Road; Attendance: 2,653; Referee: Will Finnie

30 August 2023	Nottingham Forest (1)	0–1	Burnley (1)	West Bridgford
19:45 BST		Report	Amdouni 90'	Stadium: City Ground; Attendance: 27,766; Referee: Bobby Madley

30 August 2023	Sheffield United (1)	0–0 (2–3 p)	Lincoln City (3)	Sheffield
19:45 BST		Report		Stadium: Bramall Lane; Attendance: 11,040; Referee: Paul Tierney
	Penalties
	Norwood (penalty scored); Marsh (penalty missed); Osula (penalty scored); Traoré (penalty missed); Egan (penalty missed)		(penalty scored) Mandroiu; (penalty missed) Bishop; (penalty scored) Hamilton; (penalty scored) Sørensen

=== Southern section ===
29 August 2023	Birmingham City (2)	1–3	Cardiff City (2)	Birmingham
19:45 BST	Hogan 70'	Report	R. Colwill 3'; Wintle 68'; Etete 90+4'	Stadium: St Andrew's; Attendance: 11,405; Referee: Leigh Doughty

29 August 2023	Bristol City (2)	0–1	Norwich City (2)	Bristol
19:45 BST		Report	Płacheta 49'	Stadium: Ashton Gate; Attendance: 9,408; Referee: Sam Allison

29 August 2023	Exeter City (3)	1–1 (5–3 p)	Stevenage (3)	Exeter
19:45 BST	Hartridge 5'	Report	Roberts 69'	Stadium: St James Park; Attendance: 4,006; Referee: Andrew Kitchen
	Penalties
	Trevitt (penalty scored); Carroll (penalty scored); Aimson (penalty scored); Taylor (penalty scored); Sweeney (penalty scored)		(penalty scored) Reid; (penalty scored) Roberts; (penalty missed) Butler; (penalty scored) Sweeney

29 August 2023	Fulham (1)	1–1 (5–3 p)	Tottenham Hotspur (1)	Fulham
19:45 BST	Van de Ven 19' (o.g.)	Report	Richarlison 56'	Stadium: Craven Cottage; Attendance: 21,043; Referee: Josh Smith
	Penalties
	Pereira (penalty scored); Jiménez (penalty scored); Wilson (penalty scored); Palhinha (penalty scored); Tete (penalty scored)		(penalty scored) Son Heung-min; (penalty scored) Kulusevski; (penalty missed) Sánchez; (penalty scored) Maddison

29 August 2023	Luton Town (1)	3–2	Gillingham (4)	Luton
19:45 BST	Brown 2'; Doughty 28'; Woodrow 66'	Report	Clarke 55'; Nichols 88'	Stadium: Kenilworth Road; Attendance: 9,468; Referee: Jeremy Simpson

29 August 2023	Newport County (4)	1–1 (0–3 p)	Brentford (1)	Newport
19:45 BST	Rai 90+6'	Report	Jensen 87'	Stadium: Rodney Parade; Attendance: 6,845; Referee: Scott Oldham
	Penalties
	Lewis (penalty missed); Wood (penalty missed); Morris (penalty missed)		(penalty scored) Mbeumo; (penalty scored) Wissa; (penalty scored) Lewis-Potter

29 August 2023	Plymouth Argyle (2)	2–4	Crystal Palace (1)	Plymouth
19:45 BST	Waine 6'; Cundle 46'	Report	Édouard 58'; Mateta 61', 62', 83'	Stadium: Home Park; Attendance: 15,826; Referee: Dean Whitestone

29 August 2023	Portsmouth (3)	1–1 (4–5 p)	Peterborough United (3)	Portsmouth
19:45 BST	Saydee 51'	Report	Ajiboye 29'	Stadium: Fratton Park; Attendance: 6,594; Referee: Charles Breakspear
	Penalties
	Bishop (penalty scored); Raggett (penalty scored); Pack (penalty scored); Saydee (penalty scored); Kamara (penalty missed); Morrell (penalty missed)		(penalty scored) Knight; (penalty missed) De Havilland; (penalty scored) Tomlinson; (penalty scored) Jones; (penalty scored) Corbett; (penalty scored) Ajiboye

29 August 2023	Reading (3)	2–2 (1–3 p)	Ipswich Town (2)	Reading
20:00 BST	Williams 2' (o.g.); Ehibhatiomhan 87'	Report	Humphreys 45+5'; Ladapo 59'	Stadium: Madejski Stadium; Attendance: 7,867; Referee: Lewis Smith
	Penalties
	Knibbs (penalty scored); Savage (penalty missed); Vickers (penalty missed); Elliott (penalty missed)		(penalty scored) Chaplin; (penalty scored) Evans; (penalty missed) Aluko; (penalty scored) Taylor

29 August 2023	Swansea City (2)	2–3	Bournemouth (1)	Swansea
19:45 BST	Grimes 9' (pen.); Paterson 79'	Report	Brooks 55'; Traorè 68'; Christie 90+1'	Stadium: Swansea.com Stadium; Attendance: 8,785; Referee: Matt Donohue

29 August 2023	Wycombe Wanderers (3)	0–1	Sutton United (4)	High Wycombe
19:45 BST		Report	O'Brien 19'	Stadium: Adams Park; Attendance: 1,778; Referee: Christopher Pollard

30 August 2023	Chelsea (1)	2–1	AFC Wimbledon (4)	Fulham
19:45 BST	Madueke 45+1' (pen.); Fernández 72'	Report	Tilley 19' (pen.)	Stadium: Stamford Bridge; Attendance: 37,794; Referee: Tony Harrington

== Third round ==
A total of 32 clubs played in the third round: the 8 Premier League clubs involved in European competition, Arsenal, Aston Villa, Brighton & Hove Albion, Liverpool, Manchester City, Manchester United, Newcastle United, and West Ham United entered the competition at this stage plus the 24 winners from the second round.

Number of teams per tier still in the competition
Premier League	Championship	League One	League Two	Total
17 / 20	7 / 24	4 / 24	4 / 24	32 / 92

26 September 2023	Bradford City (4)	0–2	Middlesbrough (2)	Bradford
19:45 BST		Report	Latte Lath 21'; Rogers 54'	Stadium: Valley Parade; Attendance: 15,754; Referee: Tom Nield

26 September 2023	Exeter City (3)	1–0	Luton Town (1)	Exeter
19:45 BST	Mitchell 83'	Report		Stadium: St James Park; Attendance: 7,360; Referee: James Bell

26 September 2023	Ipswich Town (2)	3–2	Wolverhampton Wanderers (1)	Ipswich
19:45 BST	Hutchinson 28'; Ladapo 39'; Taylor 58'	Report	Hwang Hee-chan 4'; Toti 15'	Stadium: Portman Road; Attendance: 20,236; Referee: Sam Barrott

26 September 2023	Mansfield Town (4)	2–2 (3–1 p)	Peterborough United (3)	Mansfield
19:45 BST	Swan 5' (pen.); Akins 90+3' (pen.)	Report	Clarke-Harris 30', 47'	Stadium: Field Mill; Attendance: 4,372; Referee: Seb Stockbridge
	Penalties
	Akins (penalty scored); Bowery (penalty scored); Flint (penalty missed); Clarke (penalty missed); Keillor-Dunn (penalty scored)		(penalty missed) Clarke-Harris; (penalty missed) Edwards; (penalty scored) Mason-Clark; (penalty missed) Knight

26 September 2023	Port Vale (3)	2–1	Sutton United (4)	Stoke-on-Trent
19:45 BST	Thomas 49'; Ojo 83'	Report	Kasimu 70'	Stadium: Vale Park; Attendance: 4,113; Referee: Will Finnie

26 September 2023	Salford City (4)	0–4	Burnley (1)	Salford
19:45 BST		Report	Berge 12'; Bruun Larsen 20'; O'Shea 27'; Odobert 81'	Stadium: Moor Lane; Attendance: 3,305; Referee: Anthony Backhouse

26 September 2023	Manchester United (1)	3–0	Crystal Palace (1)	Trafford
20:00 BST	Garnacho 21'; Casemiro 27'; Martial 55'	Report		Stadium: Old Trafford; Attendance: 72,842; Referee: Michael Salisbury

27 September 2023	Aston Villa (1)	1–2	Everton (1)	Birmingham
19:45 BST	Kamara 83'	Report	Garner 15'; Calvert-Lewin 50'	Stadium: Villa Park; Attendance: 23,851; Referee: Tony Harrington

27 September 2023	Blackburn Rovers (2)	5–2	Cardiff City (2)	Blackburn
19:45 BST	Garrett 13'; Sigurðsson 36'; Moran 49', 54'; Markanday 69'	Report	Robinson 18'; Etete 45+3'	Stadium: Ewood Park; Attendance: 5,371; Referee: Andrew Kitchen

27 September 2023	Bournemouth (1)	2–0	Stoke City (2)	Bournemouth
19:45 BST	Solanke 51'; Rothwell 54'	Report		Stadium: Dean Court; Attendance: 10,282; Referee: Graham Scott

27 September 2023	Brentford (1)	0–1	Arsenal (1)	Brentford
19:45 BST		Report	Nelson 8'	Stadium: Brentford Community Stadium; Attendance: 16,688; Referee: Darren Bond

27 September 2023	Chelsea (1)	1–0	Brighton & Hove Albion (1)	Fulham
19:45 BST	Jackson 50'	Report		Stadium: Stamford Bridge; Attendance: 37,516; Referee: Thomas Bramall

27 September 2023	Fulham (1)	2–1	Norwich City (2)	Fulham
19:45 BST	Carlos Vinícius 12'; Iwobi 72'	Report	Sainz 75'	Stadium: Craven Cottage; Attendance: 12,831; Referee: Craig Pawson

27 September 2023	Lincoln City (3)	0–1	West Ham United (1)	Lincoln
19:45 BST		Report	Souček 70'	Stadium: Sincil Bank; Attendance: 10,168; Referee: Josh Smith

27 September 2023	Liverpool (1)	3–1	Leicester City (2)	Liverpool
19:45 BST	Gakpo 48'; Szoboszlai 70'; Jota 89'	Report	McAteer 3'	Stadium: Anfield; Attendance: 49,732; Referee: Tim Robinson

27 September 2023	Newcastle United (1)	1–0	Manchester City (1)	Newcastle upon Tyne
20:00 BST	Isak 53'	Report		Stadium: St James' Park; Attendance: 51,692; Referee: Chris Kavanagh

== Fourth round ==
A total of 16 teams played in the fourth round. League Two side Mansfield Town were the lowest-ranked team in the draw.

Number of teams per tier still in the competition
Premier League	Championship	League One	League Two	Total
10 / 20	3 / 24	2 / 24	1 / 24	16 / 92

31 October 2023	Mansfield Town (4)	0–1	Port Vale (3)	Mansfield
19:45 GMT		Report	Devine 50'	Stadium: Field Mill; Attendance: 7,432; Referee: Thomas Bramall

31 October 2023	Exeter City (3)	2–3	Middlesbrough (2)	Exeter
19:45 GMT	Trevitt 13', 66'	Report	Rogers 49'; Silvera 59'; Latte Lath 82' (pen.)	Stadium: St James Park; Attendance: 7,601; Referee: Graham Scott

1 November 2023	West Ham United (1)	3–1	Arsenal (1)	Stratford
19:30 GMT	White 16' (o.g.); Kudus 50'; Bowen 60'	Report	Ødegaard 90+6'	Stadium: London Stadium; Attendance: 62,154; Referee: Simon Hooper

1 November 2023	Everton (1)	3–0	Burnley (1)	Liverpool
19:45 GMT	Tarkowski 13'; Onana 53'; Young 90+2'	Report		Stadium: Goodison Park; Attendance: 38,841; Referee: Michael Salisbury

1 November 2023	Chelsea (1)	2–0	Blackburn Rovers (2)	Fulham
19:45 GMT	Badiashile 30'; Sterling 59'	Report		Stadium: Stamford Bridge; Attendance: 39,548; Referee: Tim Robinson

1 November 2023	Ipswich Town (2)	1–3	Fulham (1)	Ipswich
19:45 GMT	Baggott 79'	Report	Wilson 9'; Muniz 50'; Cairney 77'	Stadium: Portman Road; Attendance: 28,221; Referee: Lewis Smith

1 November 2023	Bournemouth (1)	1–2	Liverpool (1)	Bournemouth
19:45 GMT	Kluivert 64'	Report	Gakpo 31'; Núñez 70'	Stadium: Dean Court; Attendance: 11,116; Referee: John Brooks

1 November 2023	Manchester United (1)	0–3	Newcastle United (1)	Trafford
20:15 GMT		Report	Almirón 28'; Hall 36'; Willock 60'	Stadium: Old Trafford; Attendance: 72,484; Referee: Robert Jones

== Quarter-finals ==
A total of eight teams played in the quarter-finals. League One side Port Vale were the lowest-ranked team in the draw, which took place on 1 November.

Number of teams per tier still in the competition
Premier League	Championship	League One	League Two	Total
6 / 20	1 / 24	1 / 24	0 / 24	8 / 92

19 December 2023	Everton (1)	1–1 (6–7 p)	Fulham (1)	Liverpool
19:45 GMT	Beto 82'	Report	Keane 41' (o.g.)	Stadium: Goodison Park; Attendance: 38,715; Referee: Graham Scott
	Penalties
	Beto (penalty scored); McNeil (penalty scored); Keane (penalty scored); Danjuma (penalty scored); Onana (penalty missed); Tarkowski (penalty scored); Garner (penalty scored); Gueye (penalty missed)		(penalty scored) Pereira; (penalty scored) Cairney; (penalty scored) Palhinha; (penalty missed) De Cordova-Reid; (penalty scored) Carlos Vinícius; (penalty scored) Tete; (penalty scored) Robinson; (penalty scored) Adarabioyo

19 December 2023	Port Vale (3)	0–3	Middlesbrough (2)	Stoke-on-Trent
19:45 GMT		Report	Howson 11'; Rogers 23'; Crooks 53'	Stadium: Vale Park; Attendance: 12,006; Referee: Michael Salisbury

19 December 2023	Chelsea (1)	1–1 (4–2 p)	Newcastle United (1)	Fulham
20:00 GMT	Mudryk 90+2'	Report	Wilson 16'	Stadium: Stamford Bridge; Attendance: 38,058; Referee: Jarred Gillett
	Penalties
	Palmer (penalty scored); Gallagher (penalty scored); Nkunku (penalty scored); Mudryk (penalty scored)		(penalty scored) Wilson; (penalty missed) Trippier; (penalty scored) Bruno Guimarães; (penalty missed) Ritchie

20 December 2023	Liverpool (1)	5–1	West Ham United (1)	Liverpool
20:00 GMT	Szoboszlai 28'; Jones 56', 84'; Gakpo 71'; Salah 82'	Report	Bowen 77'	Stadium: Anfield; Attendance: 57,332; Referee: Tim Robinson

== Semi-finals ==
A total of four teams played in the semi-finals. Championship side Middlesbrough were the lowest-ranked team in the draw, which took place on 20 December.

Number of teams per tier still in the competition
Premier League	Championship	League One	League Two	Total
3 / 20	1 / 24	0 / 24	0 / 24	4 / 92

Team 1	Agg.	Team 2	1st leg	2nd leg
Middlesbrough (2)	2–6	Chelsea (1)	1–0	1–6
Liverpool (1)	3–2	Fulham (1)	2–1	1–1

9 January 2024
20:00 GMT

Middlesbrough (2)	1–0	Chelsea (1)
Hackney 37'	Report

Riverside Stadium, Middlesbrough
Attendance: 32,097
Referee: Sam Barrott
23 January 2024
20:00 GMT

Chelsea (1)	6–1	Middlesbrough (2)
Howson 15' (o.g.); Fernández 29'; Disasi 36'; Palmer 42', 77'; Madueke 81'	Report	Rogers 88'

Stamford Bridge, Fulham
Attendance: 37,754
Referee: John Brooks

Chelsea won 6–2 on aggregate.

10 January 2024
20:00 GMT

Liverpool (1)	2–1	Fulham (1)
Jones 68'; Gakpo 71'	Report	Willian 19'

Anfield, Liverpool
Attendance: 56,724
Referee: David Coote
24 January 2024
20:00 GMT

Fulham (1)	1–1	Liverpool (1)
Diop 76'	Report	Díaz 11'

Craven Cottage, Fulham
Attendance: 24,320
Referee: Simon Hooper

Liverpool won 3–2 on aggregate.

== Final ==
25 February 2024
15:00 GMT

Chelsea	0–1 (a.e.t.)	Liverpool
	Report	Van Dijk 118'

Wembley Stadium, London
Attendance: 88,868
Referee: Chris Kavanagh

== Top goalscorers ==
Rank	Player	Club	Goals
1	(England) Morgan Rogers	Middlesbrough	5
2	(Netherlands) Cody Gakpo	Liverpool	4
3	(England) John Buckley	Blackburn Rovers	3
3	(England) Kelvin Ehibhatiomhan	Reading	3
3	(England) Kion Etete	Cardiff City	3
3	(England) Jake Garrett	Blackburn Rovers	3
3	(England) Curtis Jones	Liverpool	3
3	(France) Jean-Philippe Mateta	Crystal Palace	3
3	(New Zealand) Ben Waine	Plymouth Argyle	3
10	35 players		2
