= 2023–24 Barnsley F.C. season =

137th season in existence of Barnsley FC

Barnsley
2023–24 season
- Owner: Barnsley Investment Ltd
- Chairman: Neerav Parekh
- Manager: Neill Collins (until 22 April); Martin Devaney (from 22 April)
- Stadium: Oakwell
- League One: 6th
- FA Cup: Expelled
- EFL Cup: First Round
- EFL Trophy: Group stage
Home colours	Away colours	Third colours

The 2023–24 season is the 137th season in the existence of Barnsley and their second consecutive season in League One. In addition to the league, the club are also participating in the FA Cup, the EFL Cup, and the EFL Trophy.

EFL released an official statement on 13 July 2023 to announce that Barnsley Football Club, and former co-chairman Chien Lee and Paul Conway, had been charged with five breaches of EFL Regulations regarding the ownership of the club and failing to report information to EFL.

On 7 October 2023, Barnsley released a club statement to confirm that when travelling back to South Yorkshire after an away win against Exeter City earlier in the day, the team's coach suffered complications and caught fire. Everyone on board evacuated the coach safely, and the club thanked the emergency services for their assistance.

== Current squad ==
As of 8 February 2024

No.	Name	Position	Nationality	Place of birth	Date of birth (age)	Previous club	Date signed	Fee	Contract end
Goalkeepers
1	Liam Roberts	GK	(England)	Walsall	21 November 1994 (age 31)	Middlesbrough	18 July 2023	Loan	31 May 2024
23	Ben Killip	GK	(England)	Isleworth	24 November 1995 (age 30)	Hartlepool United	5 July 2023	Free	30 June 2024
—N/a	Adam Hayton	GK	(England)	Luton	28 April 2004 (age 22)	Tottenham Hotspur	31 January 2023	Undisclosed	30 June 2024
Defenders
2	Jordan Williams	RB	(England)	Huddersfield	22 October 1999 (age 27)	Huddersfield Town	8 August 2018	Undisclosed	30 June 2024
5	Donovan Pines	CB	(United States)	Clarksville	7 March 1998 (age 28)	(United States) DC United	13 January 2024	Free	30 June 2025
6	Maël de Gevigney	CB	(France)	Feucherolles	21 September 1999 (age 27)	(France) Nîmes	4 August 2023	£250,000	30 June 2026
17	Barry Cotter	RB	(Republic of Ireland)	Ennis	4 December 1998 (age 27)	(Republic of Ireland) Shamrock Rovers	18 January 2023	£17,500	30 June 2026
22	Corey O'Keeffe	RB	(Republic of Ireland)	(England) Birmingham	5 June 1998 (age 28)	Forest Green Rovers	25 July 2023	Undisclosed	30 June 2027
24	Robbie Cundy	CB	(England)	Oxford	30 May 1997 (age 29)	Bristol City	1 July 2022	Free	30 June 2024
26	Jamie McCart	CB	(Scotland)	Bellshill	20 June 1997 (age 29)	Rotherham United	31 August 2023	Loan	31 May 2024
34	Danny Benson	CB	(England)		15 November 2003 (age 22)	Academy	1 July 2022	Trainee	30 June 2024
37	Nathan James	CB	(Thailand)	(England) Coventry	28 September 2004 (age 22)	Burnley	14 July 2023	Free	30 June 2024
43	Josh Earl	LB	(England)	Southport	24 October 1998 (age 28)	Fleetwood Town	1 February 2024	Undisclosed	30 June 2027
46	Hayden Pickard	LB	(England)		23 August 2005 (age 21)	Academy	10 July 2023	Trainee	30 June 2024
—N/a	Charlie Winfield	LB	(England)		8 May 2002 (age 24)	Academy	1 July 2019	Trainee	30 June 2024
Midfielders
3	Jon Russell	CM	(Jamaica)	(England) Hounslow	9 October 2000 (age 26)	Huddersfield Town	31 January 2023	Undisclosed	30 June 2026
7	Nicky Cadden	LM	(Scotland)	Bellshill	19 September 1996 (age 30)	Forest Green Rovers	11 July 2022	Free	30 June 2024
8	Herbie Kane	CM	(England)	Bristol	23 November 1998 (age 27)	Liverpool	16 October 2020	£1,250,000	30 June 2024
10	Josh Benson	CM	(England)	Brentwood	5 December 1999 (age 26)	Burnley	29 July 2021	£1,000,000	30 June 2025
11	Conor Grant	CM	(Republic of Ireland)	Dublin	23 July 2001 (age 25)	Milton Keynes Dons	2 February 2024	Loan	31 May 2024
28	Jean Claude Makiessi	CM	(England)		7 September 2004 (age 22)	Academy	1 July 2023	Trainee	30 June 2024
30	Adam Phillips	CM	(England)	Garstang	15 January 1998 (age 28)	Burnley	1 September 2022	Undisclosed	30 June 2026
32	Harrison Nejman	CM	(England)		8 September 2003 (age 23)	Academy	1 July 2022	Trainee	30 June 2024
33	Matty Wolfe	CM	(England)		12 June 2000 (age 26)	Academy	1 July 2020	Trainee	30 June 2024
38	Theo Chapman	AM	(England)		31 March 2005 (age 21)	Academy	1 July 2023	Trainee	30 June 2024
40	Aaron Atkinson	CM	(England)		15 November 2004 (age 21)	Oldham Athletic	20 October 2023	Undisclosed	30 June 2025
48	Luca Connell	DM	(Republic of Ireland)	(England) Liverpool	20 April 2001 (age 25)	(Scotland) Celtic	1 July 2022	Free	30 June 2027
63	Vimal Yoganathan	CM	(Sri Lanka)		13 January 2006 (age 20)	Academy	7 August 2023	Trainee	30 June 2026
68	Jonathan Bland	CM	(Wales)		24 October 2005 (age 21)	Academy	7 August 2023	Trainee	30 June 2024
Forwards
9	Sam Cosgrove	CF	(England)	Beverley	2 December 1996 (age 29)	Birmingham City	2 September 2023	Free	30 June 2025
12	Fábio Jaló	LW	(Portugal)	Lisbon	18 November 2005 (age 20)	(Portugal) Benfica	1 July 2019	Undisclosed	30 June 2024
19	Aiden Marsh	CF	(England)	Barnsley	5 May 2003 (age 23)	Academy	1 January 2020	Trainee	30 June 2024
35	Josiah Dyer	CF	(Montserrat)	(England) Hammersmith and Fulham	24 September 2004 (age 22)	Academy	10 July 2023	Trainee	30 June 2024
36	Max Watters	CF	(England)	Camden	23 March 1999 (age 27)	(Wales) Cardiff City	24 July 2023	Undisclosed	30 June 2026
39	Mylan Benjamin	CF	(England)		21 September 2004 (age 22)	Academy	10 July 2023	Trainee	30 June 2024
44	Devante Cole	CF	(England)	Alderley Edge	10 May 1995 (age 31)	(Scotland) Motherwell	1 July 2021	Free	30 June 2024
45	John McAtee	SS	(England)	Salford	23 July 1999 (age 27)	Luton Town	24 August 2023	Loan	31 May 2024
47	Emmaisa Nzondo	CF	(England)		21 January 2006 (age 20)	Academy	5 September 2023	Trainee	30 June 2024
Out on Loan
4	Kacper Łopata	CB	(Poland)	Kraków	27 August 2001 (age 25)	Woking	1 July 2023	Free	30 June 2027
15	Kyran Lofthouse	RB	(England)	Oxford	15 September 2000 (age 26)	Woking	28 July 2023	Free	30 June 2026
14	Oli Shaw	CF	(Scotland)	Edinburgh	12 March 1998 (age 28)	(Scotland) Kilmarnock	31 January 2023	Undisclosed	30 June 2025
16	Andrew Dallas	CF	(Scotland)	Glasgow	22 July 1999 (age 27)	Solihull Moors	24 July 2023	Free	30 June 2026
18	Joe Ackroyd	CM	(England)	Barnsley	6 September 2002 (age 24)	Academy	1 2021	Trainee	30 June 2024
20	Callum Styles	CM	(Hungary)	(England) Bury	27 March 2000 (age 26)	Bury	6 August 2018	Undisclosed	30 June 2025
21	Conor McCarthy	CB	(Republic of Ireland)	Blarney	11 April 1998 (age 28)	(Scotland) St Mirren	1 July 2022	Free	30 June 2025
31	Paul Cooper	GK	(England)		22 April 2003 (age 23)	Matlock Town	23 September 2022	Undisclosed	30 June 2024
41	Jack Shepherd	CB	(England)		6 March 2001 (age 25)	Academy	1 July 2023	Trainee	30 June 2024
50	Kieran Flavell	GK	(England)		21 September 2003 (age 23)	Academy	1 July 2022	Trainee	30 June 2024

== Statistics ==
=== Goals record ===
As of 6 August 2023

Rank	No.	Nat.	Po.	Name	League One	FA Cup	League Cup	League Trophy	Total
1	44	(England)	CF	Devante Cole	3	0	0	0	3
2	5	(England)	CB	Liam Kitching	1	0	0	0	1
2	16	(Scotland)	CF	Andrew Dallas	1	0	0	0	1
2	3	(Jamaica)	CM	Jon Russell	1	0	0	0	1
2	19	(England)	CF	Aiden Marsh	0	0	1	0	1
2	8	(England)	CM	Herbie Kane	0	0	1	0	1
2	17	(Republic of Ireland)	RB	Barry Cotter	1	0	0	0	1

== Transfers ==
=== In ===
Date	Pos	Player	Transferred from	Fee	Ref
1 July 2023	CB	Kacper Łopata (POL)	Woking (ENG)	Free transfer	
4 July 2023	CB	Jack Shepherd (ENG) †	Pontefract Collieries (ENG)	Free transfer	
5 July 2023	GK	Ben Killip (ENG)	Hartlepool United (ENG)	Free transfer	
24 July 2023	CF	Andrew Dallas (SCO)	Solihull Moors (ENG)	Free transfer	
24 July 2023	CF	Max Watters (ENG)	Cardiff City (WAL)	Undisclosed	
25 July 2023	RB	Corey O'Keeffe (IRL)	Forest Green Rovers (ENG)	Undisclosed	
28 July 2023	RB	Kyran Lofthouse (ENG)	Woking (ENG)	Free transfer	
4 August 2023	CB	Maël de Gevigney (FRA)	Nîmes (FRA)	Undisclosed	
2 September 2023	CF	Sam Cosgrove (ENG)	Birmingham City (ENG)	Free transfer	
20 October 2023	CB	Aaron Atkinson (ENG) †	(England) Oldham Athletic	Free transfer	
13 January 2024	CB	Donovan Pines (USA)	DC United (USA)	Free transfer	
1 February 2024	LB	Josh Earl (ENG)	Fleetwood Town (ENG)	Undisclosed	

† Initially signed for the Under-21s

=== Out ===
Date	Pos	Player	Transferred to	Fee	Ref
30 June 2023	CF	Jack Butterfill (ENG)	Free agent	Released	
30 June 2023	CM	Keegan Hartley (ENG)	Free agent	Released	
30 June 2023	RB	Kareem Hassan-Smith (ENG)	Free agent	Released	
30 June 2023	RB	Jordan Helliwell (ENG)	Free agent	Released	
30 June 2023	CM	Will Lancaster (ENG)	Bradford (Park Avenue) (ENG)	Released	
30 June 2023	LB	Clarke Oduor (KEN)	Bradford City (ENG)	Released	
30 June 2023	CB	Rudi Pache (ENG)	Free agent	Released	
30 June 2023	CB	Jason Sraha (ENG)	Shrewsbury Town (ENG)	Released	
30 June 2023	RW	Luke Thomas (ENG)	Bristol Rovers (ENG)	Free transfer	
3 July 2023	CB	Mads Juel Andersen (DEN)	Luton Town (ENG)	Undisclosed	
17 July 2023	GK	Bradley Collins (ENG)	Coventry City (ENG)	Undisclosed	
18 July 2023	CB	Jasper Moon (ENG)	Burton Albion (ENG)	Undisclosed	
22 July 2023	GK	Jamie Searle (NZL)	Forest Green Rovers (ENG)	Undisclosed	
4 August 2023	CF	James Norwood (ENG)	Oldham Athletic (ENG)	Undisclosed	
1 September 2023	CB	Liam Kitching (ENG)	Coventry City (ENG)	Undisclosed	
29 January 2024	CF	Aaron Leya Iseka (BEL)	OFI (GRE)	Undisclosed	

=== Loaned in ===
Date	Pos	Player	Loaned from	Until	Ref
18 July 2023	GK	Liam Roberts (ENG)	Middlesbrough (ENG)	End of season	
24 August 2023	SS	John McAtee (ENG)	Luton Town (ENG)	End of season	
31 August 2023	CB	Jamie McCart (SCO)	Rotherham United (ENG)	End of season	
1 September 2023	LB	Owen Dodgson (ENG)	Burnley (ENG)	1 January 2024 (Note: On 1 January, Dodgson was recalled to Burnley early from his season-long loan.)	
2 February 2024	CM	Conor Grant (IRL)	Milton Keynes Dons (ENG)	End of season	

=== Loaned out ===
Date	Pos	Player	Loaned to	Fee	Ref
1 July 2023	GK	Adam Hayton (ENG)	Worksop Town (ENG)	30 August 2023	
21 August 2023	CF	Josiah Dyer (MSR)	Basford United (ENG)	16 September 2023	
21 August 2023	CM	Jean Claude Makiessi (ENG)	Basford United (ENG)	16 September 2023	
31 August 2023	CF	Oli Shaw (SCO)	Motherwell (SCO)	24 January 2024 (Note: On 24 January, Shaw was recalled from his season-long loan at Motherwell.)	
1 September 2023	CF	Andrew Dallas (SCO)	Kilmarnock (SCO)	20 January 2024 (Note: On 20 January, Dallas was recalled from his season-long loan at Kilmarnock.)	
9 September 2023	GK	Rogan Ravenhill (ENG)	Liversedge (ENG)	6 October 2023	
21 September 2023	CF	Aaron Leya Iseka (BEL)	Hapoel Hadera (ISR)	End of season	
21 September 2023	CF	Aiden Marsh (ENG)	York City (ENG)	7 November 2023 (Note: On 25 October, Marsh's loan at York was extended by a further month.) (Note: On 7 November, Marsh was recalled two-weeks early from his loan stay at York.)	
22 September 2023	RB	Kyran Lofthouse (ENG)	Gateshead (ENG)	4 January 2024 (Note: On 4 January, Lofthouse was recalled from his loan at Gateshead slightly early.)	
20 October 2023	AM	Theo Chapman (ENG)	Farsley Celtic (ENG)	18 November 2023	
21 October 2023	CB	Danny Benson (ENG)	Bradford (Park Avenue) (ENG)	2 January 2024	
27 October 2023	LB	Charlie Winfield (ENG)	Darlington (ENG)	25 November 2023	
9 January 2024	RB	Kyran Lofthouse (ENG)	Milton Keynes Dons (ENG)	End of season	
17 January 2024	CB	Conor McCarthy (IRL)	Swindon Town (ENG)	End of season	
18 January 2024	GK	Paul Cooper (ENG)	Ashton United (ENG)	15 February 2024	
22 January 2024	CM	Joe Ackroyd (ENG)	Buxton (ENG)	End of season	
22 January 2024	CF	Andrew Dallas (SCO)	Oldham Athletic (ENG)	End of season	
31 January 2024	GK	Kieran Flavell (ENG)	Bradford (Park Avenue) (ENG)	28 February 2024	
1 February 2024	CB	Kacper Łopata (POL)	Port Vale (ENG)	End of season	
1 February 2024	CB	Jack Shepherd (ENG)	Cheltenham Town (ENG)	End of season	
1 February 2024	CM	Callum Styles (HUN)	Sunderland (ENG)	End of season	
8 February 2024	CF	Oli Shaw (SCO)	Motherwell (SCO)	End of season	

== Pre-season and friendlies ==
On 5 June, Barnsley announced their pre-season schedule, with matches against Worksop Town, AFC Fylde, Hull City, Blackburn Rovers, Mansfield Town and Crewe Alexandra.

Win Draw Loss Fixtures

1 July 2023 Friendly	Worksop Town	1–2	Barnsley	Worksop
15:00 BST	Hall 82'	Report	Phillips 22'; Shaw 87'	Stadium: Sandy Lane

8 July 2023 Friendly	AFC Fylde	Abandoned	Barnsley	Medlar-with-Wesham
15:00 BST		Report	Cole 12'; Kane 32'	Stadium: Mill Farm Sports Village; Attendance: 0 (Behind closed doors)
Note: Fixture was abandoned shortly before the hour mark due to inclement weather conditions.

18 July 2023 Friendly	Hull City	1–0	Barnsley	Kingston upon Hull
19:45 BST	Jarvis 30'	Report		Stadium: MKM Stadium

22 July 2023 Friendly	Blackburn Rovers	4–3	Barnsley	Blackburn
15:00 BST	Leonard 60' (pen.); Buckley 71' (pen.); Gilsenan 74'; Bloxham 84'	Report	Norwood 68', 80'; Cole 90'	Stadium: Blackburn Rovers Senior Training Centre; Attendance: 0 (Behind closed doors)

25 July 2023 Friendly	Mansfield Town	Cancelled	Barnsley	Mansfield
19:00 BST				Stadium: Field Mill
Note: Fixture was cancelled on Barnsley's request.

29 July 2023 Friendly	Barnsley	2–1	Crewe Alexandra	Barnsley
15:00 BST	Norwood 4'; Łopata 47'	Report	Tracey 70'	Stadium: Oakwell

== Competitions ==
=== Overall record ===
Competition	Starting round	Final position	Record							
Competition	Starting round	Final position	Pld	W	D	L	GF	GA	GD	Win %
League One	Matchday 1		42	21	11	10	75	55	+20	50.00
FA Cup	First round	First round	2	1	1	0	6	3	+3	50.00
EFL Cup	First round	First round	1	0	1	0	2	2	+0	0.00
EFL Trophy	Group stage	Second round	4	2	0	2	7	8	−1	50.00
Total			49	24	13	12	90	68	+22	48.98

Last updated: 9 April 2024
Source: Soccerway

=== League One ===
==== League table ====
Pos	Team	Pld	W	D	L	GF	GA	GD	Pts	Promotion, qualification or relegation
3	Bolton Wanderers	46	25	12	9	86	51	+35	87	Qualification for League One play-offs
4	Peterborough United	46	25	9	12	89	61	+28	84	Qualification for League One play-offs
5	Oxford United (O, P)	46	22	11	13	79	56	+23	77	Qualification for League One play-offs
6	Barnsley	46	21	13	12	82	64	+18	76	Qualification for League One play-offs
7	Lincoln City	46	20	14	12	65	40	+25	74	
8	Blackpool	46	21	10	15	65	48	+17	73	
9	Stevenage	46	19	14	13	57	46	+11	71	

Source: EFL Official Website
Rules for classification: 1) Points; 2) Goal difference; 3) Number of goals scored; 4) Head-to-head results; 5) Wins; 6) Away goals; 7) Penalty points (sec 9.5); 8) 12-point sending off offences
(O) Play-off winners; (P) Promoted

==== Results summary ====
Overall								Home						Away					
Pld	W	D	L	GF	GA	GD	Pts	W	D	L	GF	GA	GD	W	D	L	GF	GA	GD
45	21	12	12	81	63	+18	75	9	6	7	37	32	+5	12	6	5	44	31	+13

Last updated: 20 April 2024.
Source: Soccerway

==== Results by round ====
Round	1	2	3	4	5	6	8	7^{1}	9	10	11	12	14	15	16	17	19	20	21	22	23	24	25	26	28	18^{3}	27^{4}	30	31	32	33	34	35	36	13^{2}	37	38	39	41	42	43	29^{5}	44	40^{6}	45	46
Ground	H	A	H	H	A	A	H	H	A	H	A	A	A	H	H	A	A	H	A	H	H	A	A	H	A	H	A	H	A	H	A	A	H	A	H	H	A	H	H	A	A	A	H	A	A	H
Result	W	D	L	L	W	W	W	L	W	L	W	W	D	W	D	L	D	W	W	D	W	W	D	D	W	W	W	L	D	W	D	W	W	W	D	L	W	D	L	W	L	L	D	L	L	D
Position	1	5	10	15	12	9	5	6	5	7	4	3	3	3	5	6	8	7	7	7	7	7	7	6	6	5	5	5	5	4	4	4	4	4	4	5	4	5	5	5	5	5	5	5	5	6

Updated to match(es) played on 20 April 2024. Source: Soccerway
A = Away; H = Home; W = Win; D = Draw; L = Loss; P = Postponed
Notes:
- ^{1} Matchday 7 (vs Portsmouth) was postponed due to the international call-ups.
- ^{2} Matchday 13 (vs Bolton Wanderers) was postponed due to the international call-ups.
- ^{3} Matchday 18 (vs Carlisle United) was postponed due to the international call-ups.
- ^{4} Matchday 27 (vs Oxford United) was postponed due Oxford's FA Cup involvements.
- ^{5} Matchday 29 (vs Stevenage) was postponed due to a unplayable playing surface.
- ^{6} Matchday 40 (vs Portsmouth) was postponed due to the international call-ups.

==== Matches ====
On 22 June, the EFL League One fixtures were released.

Win Draw Loss Fixtures

5 August 2023 1	Barnsley	7–0	Port Vale	Barnsley
15:00 BST	Styles (yellow card) 18'; Cole 23', 47', 53'; Kane (yellow card) 24'; Watters (yellow card) 25'; Jones 45' (o.g.); Kitching 60'; Russell 64' (yellow card) 72'; Roberts (yellow card) 89'; Shepherd (yellow card) 90+1'; Dallas 90+6'	Report	Ojo (yellow card) 39'; Cass (yellow card) 63'	Stadium: Oakwell; Attendance: 13,796; Referee: David Rock

12 August 2023 2	Bristol Rovers	1–1	Barnsley	Bristol
15:00 BST	Sinclair 81'	Report	Cadden 7'; Cotter (yellow card) 23'; Russell (yellow card) 63'; Kane (yellow card) 81'	Stadium: Memorial Stadium; Attendance: 7,929; Referee: Carl Brook

15 August 2023 3	Barnsley	1–3	Peterborough United	Barnsley
19:45 BST	Cotter 51'	Report	Kyprianou (yellow card) 44' (goal) 74'; Clarke-Harris 76'; Poku 85'	Stadium: Oakwell; Attendance: 11,789; Referee: Anthony Backhouse

19 August 2023 4	Barnsley	1–3	Oxford United	Barnsley
15:00 BST	Styles (yellow card) 5'; de Gevigney (yellow card) 22'; Cole 70'; Williams (yellow card) 80'	Report	Brannagan 8' (pen.) (yellow card) 78'; Williams 54' (o.g.); Brown (yellow card) 55'; Goodrham 88'	Stadium: Oakwell; Attendance: 11,753; Referee: Martin Coy

26 August 2023 5	Wigan Athletic	0–2	Barnsley	Wigan
15:00 BST	Hughes (red card) 21'; Magennis (yellow card) 90+5'	Report	Cole 26'; Williams (yellow card) 48'; Kane (yellow card) 67'; Phillips (yellow card) 80'; McAtee 90+2'	Stadium: DW Stadium; Attendance: 10,683; Referee: Seb Stockbridge

2 September 2023 6	Cheltenham Town	0–2	Barnsley	Cheltenham
15:00 BST	Williams (yellow card) 14'; Freestone (yellow card) 66'; Bevan (yellow card) 70'	Report	McAtee (yellow card) 33'; Kane (yellow card) 45+4'; Cole 54'; Shepherd (yellow card) 78'; Watters 90+2'	Stadium: Whaddon Road; Attendance: 3,923; Referee: Sunny Gill

16 September 2023 8	Barnsley	2–0	Burton Albion	Barnsley
15:00 BST	Cole 21', 68'	Report		Stadium: Oakwell; Attendance: 11,533; Referee: Marc Edwards

19 September 2023 7	Barnsley	2–3	Portsmouth	Barnsley
15:00 BST	Cotter 49'; Styles 77'	Report	Bishop 8' (pen.); Lane 8'; Ogilvie 16'; Rafferty (yellow card) 80'	Stadium: Oakwell; Attendance: 11,464; Referee: Lewis Smith
Note: Fixture was previous postponed due to international call-ups.

23 September 2023 9	Northampton Town	1–2	Barnsley	Northampton
15:00 BST	Appéré 90+8'	Report	Styles 4'; Phillips (yellow card) 12'; O'Keeffe (yellow card) 50'; Łopata (yellow card) 59'; McCart (yellow card) 82'; Cole 88'	Stadium: Sixfields Stadium; Attendance: 7,522; Referee: Alan Young

30 September 2023 10	Barnsley	0–1	Blackpool	Barnsley
15:00 BST	O'Keeffe (yellow card) 23'	Report	Rhodes 24' (pen.); Weir (yellow card) 53'; Grimshaw (yellow card) 59'; Norburn (yellow card) 63'; Dougall (yellow card) 71'; Husband (yellow card) 82'; Connolly (yellow card) 90+5'; Morgan (yellow card) 90+5'	Stadium: Oakwell; Attendance: 13,005; Referee: Charles Breakspear

3 October 2023 11	Cambridge United	0–4	Barnsley	Cambridge
19:45 BST	Morrison (yellow card) 59'; Lankester (yellow card) 63'	Report	Cadden 7' (yellow card) 79'; de Gevigney 33'; Watters 59'; Styles (yellow card) 67'; Russell 83'	Stadium: Abbey Stadium; Attendance: 5,493; Referee: Thomas Parsons

7 October 2023 12	Exeter City	0–1	Barnsley	Exeter
15:00 BST	Aitchison (yellow card) 45'; Cole (yellow card) 70'	Report	McCart (yellow card) 6'; Styles (yellow card) 45+1'; McAtee 89'	Stadium: St James Park; Attendance: 6,542; Referee: Scott Jackson

21 October 2023 14	Leyton Orient	1–1	Barnsley	Leyton
15:00 GMT	Pigott 27' (pen.)	Report	Kane 69'; Cosgrove (yellow card) 89' (yellow-red card) 90+1'	Stadium: Brisbane Road; Attendance: 8,642; Referee: Peter Wright

24 October 2023 15	Barnsley	3–0	Shrewsbury Town	Barnsley
19:45 GMT	Styles (yellow card) 14' (goal) 23'; Kane 19' (pen.); Cole 75'	Report	Dunkley (yellow card) 4'; Flanagan (yellow card) 80'	Stadium: Oakwell; Attendance: 10,859; Referee: Simon Mather

28 October 2023 16	Barnsley	2–2	Fleetwood Town	Barnsley
15:00 GMT	Cole (penalty missed) 7' 7'; Williams (yellow card) 32'; Kane (yellow card) 38'; O'Keeffe 88'	Report	Quitirna 3', 34'; Broom (yellow card) 45'; Marriott (yellow card) 45+4'	Stadium: Oakwell; Attendance: 12,141; Referee: Neil Hair

11 November 2023 17	Derby County	3–0	Barnsley	Derby
15:00 GMT	Collins (yellow card) 17' (goal) 35' (pen.), 63'; Forsyth (yellow card) 36' (goal) 48'	Report	Russell (yellow card) 66'	Stadium: Pride Park Stadium; Attendance: 28,019; Referee: John Busby

15 November 2023 19	Lincoln City	2–2	Barnsley	Lincoln
15:00 GMT	Mandroiu 5' (pen.); Eyoma 88'; Vale (yellow card) 90+2'	Report	Cotter 68'; McAtee 72'; McCart (yellow card) 90+6'	Stadium: Sincil Bank; Attendance: 9,173; Referee: Ross Joyce

28 November 2023 20	Barnsley	1–0	Wycombe Wanderers	Barnsley
19:45 GMT	Cosgrove 90+1'	Report	Phillips (yellow card) 59'; Boyes (yellow card) 89' (yellow-red card) 90+2'; Stryjek (yellow card) 90+2'; Tafazolli (yellow card) 90+5'	Stadium: Oakwell; Attendance: 10,466; Referee: Darren Drysdale

9 December 2023 21	Reading	1–3	Barnsley	Reading
15:00 GMT	Knibbs 4'; Craig (yellow card) 11'; Smith (yellow card) 39'	Report	Cadden (yellow card) 14'; Kane 39' (pen.) (yellow card) 90+4'; Cole (yellow card) 61' (goal) 80'; Styles (yellow card) 63'; Phillips (yellow card) 67'; Watters 87'	Stadium: Madejski Stadium; Attendance: 12,519; Referee: Ollie Yates

16 December 2023 22	Barnsley	1–1	Charlton Athletic	Barnsley
15:00 GMT	Phillips 24'; McCart (yellow card) 39'; Kane (yellow card) 51'; Cosgrove (yellow card) 52'; Dodgson (yellow card) 86'	Report	Maynard-Brewer (yellow card) 24'; Fraser (yellow card) 48'; Thomas (yellow card) 60'; Blackett-Taylor 70'; Edun (yellow card) 86'	Stadium: Oakwell; Attendance: 11,716; Referee: Simon Mather

23 December 2023 23	Barnsley	2–1	Stevenage	Barnsley
15:00 GMT	McAtee 32'; Connell (yellow card) 66'; Kane 70', (yellow card) 81'; Cotter (yellow card) 90+7'	Report	James-Wildin 4'; Butler (yellow card) 67'	Stadium: Oakwell; Attendance: 12,525; Referee: Marc Edwards

26 December 2023 24	Port Vale	2–3	Barnsley	Burslem
15:00 GMT	Chislett 72'; Lowe (yellow card) 75'; Garrity (yellow card) 78'; Shorrock 90+3'; Debrah (yellow card) 90+9'	Report	Connell (yellow card) 13'; Phillips 17'; McAtee 32', 37'	Stadium: Vale Park; Attendance: 8,053; Referee: Scott Oldham

29 December 2023 25	Peterborough United	2–2	Barnsley	Peterborough
19:45 GMT	Clarke-Harris 45+2', 48'	Report	Kane 10'; Cole 31'; Connell (yellow card) 87'	Stadium: London Road Stadium; Attendance: 10,686; Referee: Adam Herczeg

1 January 2024 26	Barnsley	1–1	Wigan Athletic	Barnsley
15:00 GMT	McAtee (yellow card) 33'; Cole 45+1'; Styles (yellow card) 82'; Connell (yellow card) 86'	Report	Wyke (yellow card) 64'; Sessegnon (yellow card) 75'; Smith 87'	Stadium: Oakwell; Attendance: 12,836; Referee: Seb Stockbridge

13 January 2024 28	Barnsley	2–1	Bristol Rovers	Barnsley
15:00 GMT	Mcatee (yellow card) 21'; Cole 43'; De Gevigney (yellow card) 67'; O'Keeffe 73'; Kane (yellow card) 79'	Report	Martin 68'; Evans (yellow card) 90+6'	Stadium: Oakwell; Attendance: 11,786; Referee: Scott Jackson

16 January 2024 18	Barnsley	2–1	Carlisle United	Barnsley
19:45 GMT	Cole 58'; Kane 86' (pen.)	Report	Armstrong 7', (yellow card) 81'	Stadium: Oakwell; Referee: Will Finnie
Note: Fixture was originally scheduled for 18 November, but was postponed due to international call-ups.

23 January 2024 27	Oxford United	0–1	Barnsley	Oxford
19:45 GMT	Brown (yellow card) 49'; Smyth (yellow card) 88'; Rodrigues (yellow card) 89'	Report	Long 29' (o.g.); Russell (yellow card) 37'; De Gevigney (yellow card) 64'; Cosgrove (yellow card) 77'; O'Keeffe (yellow card) 82'	Stadium: Kassam Stadium; Attendance: 6,703; Referee: Lee Swabey
Note: Fixture was originally scheduled for 6 January, but was postponed due to Oxford's FA Cup involvements.

27 January 2024 30	Barnsley	1–2	Exeter City	Barnsley
15:00 GMT	Cotter (yellow card) 58'; De Gevigney 87'	Report	Aitchison 17' (yellow card) 90+6'; Cole 31'; Watts (yellow card) 83'; Hartridge (yellow card) 90+2'	Stadium: Oakwell; Attendance: 11,858; Referee: Thomas Kirk

3 February 2024 31	Bolton Wanderers	1–1	Barnsley	Horwich
15:00 GMT	Maghoma (yellow card) 18'; Ashworth 64'; Dempsey (yellow card) 84'	Report	de Gevigney (yellow card) 2'; Cole 5' (yellow card) 90+1'; Connell (yellow card) 35'; Williams (yellow card) 47'	Stadium: Toughsheet Community Stadium; Attendance: 21,709; Referee: Leigh Doughty

10 February 2024 32	Barnsley	2–1	Leyton Orient	Barnsley
15:00 GMT	Connell (yellow card) 80' (yellow-red card) 89'; Phillips 88', 90+5'; Earl (yellow card) 90+3'; de Gevigney (yellow card) 90+6'	Report	Sotiriou 10'; Galbraith (yellow card) 87'; Pigott (yellow card) 90+1'; O'Neill (yellow card) 90+4'	Stadium: Oakwell; Attendance: 12,370; Referee: Ross Joyce

13 February 2024 33	Shrewsbury Town	1–1	Barnsley	Shrewsbury
19:45 GMT	Cadden 7' (o.g.); Benning (yellow card) 49'; Maroši (yellow card) 67'; Perry (yellow card) 89'	Report	Phillips (yellow card) 58'; de Gevigney (yellow card) 61'; Kane 90+2'	Stadium: New Meadow; Attendance: 5,500; Referee: Thomas Parsons

17 February 2024 34	Fleetwood Town	1–2	Barnsley	Fleetwood
15:00 GMT	Lawal 32'	Report	Cosgrove 23'; de Gevigney (yellow card) 49'; McCart (yellow card) 54'; Kane 59'; Earl (yellow card) 62'; Cadden (yellow card) 77'	Stadium: Highbury Stadium; Attendance: 3,850; Referee: Declan Bourne

24 February 2024 35	Barnsley	2–1	Derby County	Barnsley
15:00 GMT	Phillips 33', 66'; Earl (yellow card) 79'; Cosgrove (yellow card) 86'; Cole (yellow card) 90+1'; Roberts (yellow card) 90+8'	Report	Bradley 18'; Nelson (yellow card) 86'	Stadium: Oakwell; Attendance: 18,332; Referee: Andrew Kitchen

2 March 2024 36	Wycombe Wanderers	2–4	Barnsley	High Wycombe
15:00 GMT	Taylor 16'; Grimmer (yellow card) 44'; Leahy (yellow card) 45+1'; Sadlier 52'; Wheeler (red card) 68'; Kone (yellow card) 74'	Report	Phillips (yellow card) 35'; Cosgrove (yellow card) 44', (goal) 45+2'; Pines 56'; O'Keeffe 65'; Grant 72'; Russell (yellow card) 90+7'	Stadium: Adams Park; Attendance: 4,768; Referee: Dean Whitestone

5 March 2024 13	Barnsley	2–2	Bolton Wanderers	Barnsley
19:45 GMT	McAtee 25' (yellow card) 32'; Pines 47'; Williams (yellow card) 90+11'	Report	Thomason (yellow card) 11'; Adeboyejo 62'; Sheehan (penalty missed) 90+8'; Williams 90+8'; Jerome (yellow card) 90+8'; Iredale (yellow card) 90+10'	Stadium: Oakwell; Attendance: 14,808; Referee: James Bell
Note: Fixture was originally scheduled for 14 October, but was postponed due to international call-ups within the Bolton squad.

9 March 2024 37	Barnsley	1–5	Lincoln City	Barnsley
15:00 GMT	Kane (yellow card) 41'; Cole (yellow card) 52'; Phillips 77'; O'Keeffe (yellow card) 86'	Report	Taylor 15'; House (yellow card) 45'; Moylan 55', 72'; Mandroiu 58'; Hackett-Fairchild (yellow card) 70'; Makama 79'	Stadium: Oakwell; Attendance: 14,158; Referee: Ben Atkinson

12 March 2024 38	Carlisle United	2–3	Barnsley	Carlisle
19:45 GMT	Armstrong 10'; Butterworth 87'	Report	Williams 33'; McAtee 49'; O'Keeffe (yellow card) 66'; Russell 76'; Killip (yellow card) 90'; Grant (yellow card) 90+4'	Stadium: Brunton Park; Attendance: 5,522; Referee: Edward Duckworth

16 March 2024 39	Barnsley	0–0	Cheltenham Town	Barnsley
15:00 GMT	Earl (yellow card) 55'	Report	Ferry (yellow card) 90+1'	Stadium: Oakwell; Attendance: 12,056; Referee: Daniel Middleton

29 March 2024 41	Barnsley	0–2	Cambridge United	Barnsley
15:00 GMT	McCart (yellow card) 46'; Earl (yellow card) 68'	Report	de Gevigney 13' (o.g.); Jobe (yellow card) 69'; Bennett (yellow card) 70'; Ahadme 72'	Stadium: Oakwell; Attendance: 13,363; Referee: Simon Mather

1 April 2024 42	Burton Albion	1–3	Barnsley	Burton upon Trent
15:00 BST	Powell 37'	Report	McAtee 54', 64'; Connell 69'	Stadium: Pirelli Stadium; Attendance: 4,024; Referee: Martin Coy

6 April 2024 43	Charlton Athletic	2–1	Barnsley	Charlton
15:00 BST	May 20', 40'; Thomas (yellow card) 23'; Anderson (yellow card) 65'; Hector (yellow card) 77'; Dobson (yellow card) 90+3'; Aneke (penalty missed) 90+5'	Report	Phillips 28' (pen.) (yellow card) 90+3'; Earl (yellow card) 37'; McAtee (yellow card) 77'; Connell (yellow card) 90+6'	Stadium: The Valley; Attendance: 13,844; Referee: Ben Speedie

9 April 2024 29	Stevenage	2–1	Barnsley	Stevenage
19:45 BST	Reid 45+2'; Butler 51'; List (yellow card) 75'; Thompson (yellow card) 85'	Report	De Gevigney (yellow card) 12'; Phillips 30'; McCart (yellow card) 51'	Stadium: Broadhall Way; Attendance: 4,727; Referee: Declan Bourne
Note: Fixture was originally scheduled for 20 January, but was postponed due to a unplayable playing surface.

13 April 2024 44	Barnsley	2–2	Reading	Barnsley
15:00 BST	Phillips 29', (yellow card) 64'; Jaló 83'	Report	Smith 21'; Wing 81'	Stadium: Oakwell; Attendance: 12,405; Referee: Seb Stockbridge

16 April 2024 40	Portsmouth	3–2	Barnsley	Portsmouth
19:45 BST	Yengi 9'; Evans (yellow card) 74'; Bishop 83' (pen.); Shaughnessy 89'	Report	Cole 6'; McAtee 59'; de Gevigney (yellow card) 75'	Stadium: Fratton Park; Attendance: 19,960; Referee: Paul Howard
Note: Fixture was originally scheduled for 23 March, but was postponed due to international call-ups.

20 April 2024 45	Blackpool	3–2	Barnsley	Blackpool
15:00 BST	Carey 12'; Husband 45+3'; Coulson 47', (yellow card) 63'; Dembélé (yellow card) 69'	Report	Kane (yellow card) 11'; McAtee 67'; Phillips (yellow card) 84', (goal) 90+4'; Williams (yellow card) 90+6'	Stadium: Bloomfield Road; Attendance: 12,526; Referee: Sunny Singh Gill

27 April 2024 46	Barnsley	1–1	Northampton Town	Barnsley
15:00 BST	Kane 18', (yellow card) 90+5'; de Gevigney (yellow card) 21'; O'Keeffe (yellow card) 43'	Report	McWilliams (yellow card) 90+5'; Appere 90+6'	Stadium: Oakwell; Attendance: 15,108; Referee: Oliver Yates

=== FA Cup ===
Barnsley were draw at home to Horsham in the first round. On 22 November, Barnsley were removed from the competition for fielding an ineligible player in their replay win against Horsham.

Win Draw Loss Fixtures

3 November 2023 First round	Barnsley	3–3	Horsham	Barnsley
19:45 GMT	Watters 14'; Dodgson (yellow card) 35'; Jaló 45+1'; McCart (yellow card) 54'; De Gevigney 64'	Report	Fenelon 22'; Hester-Cook (yellow card) 25'; Hammond 38' (pen.); Richards 81'	Stadium: Oakwell; Attendance: 4,463; Referee: Ben Toner

14 November 2023 First round replay	Horsham	0–3	Barnsley	Horsham
19:30 GMT	Baxter (yellow card) 41'; Tuck (yellow card) 90+3'	Report	Cadden 3'; McAtee 10', 27'	Stadium: Hop Oast Stadium; Referee: Sunny Gill

=== EFL Cup ===
Barnsley were drawn at home to Tranmere Rovers in the first round.

Win Draw Loss Fixtures

8 August 2023 First round	Barnsley	2–2 (6–7 p)	Tranmere Rovers	Barnsley
19:45 BST	Russell (yellow card) 5'; Łopata (yellow card) 35'; Kane 45+3'; Lofthouse (yellow card) 86'; Marsh 90+8'	Report	Norris 23'; Taylor 47'; Leake (yellow card) 69'; Lewis (yellow card) 90+2'	Stadium: Oakwell; Attendance: 4,343; Referee: Thomas Kirk
	Penalties
	Marsh (penalty missed); Jaló (penalty scored); Chapman (penalty scored); Nejman (penalty scored); Cotter (penalty scored); Łopata (penalty scored); Killip (penalty scored); Shepherd (penalty missed)		Hawkes (penalty scored); Jennings (penalty scored); Hemmings (penalty scored); Hendry (penalty missed); McAlear (penalty scored); Saunders (penalty scored); Leake (penalty scored); Lewis (penalty scored)

=== EFL Trophy ===
In the group stage, Barnsley were drawn in Northern Group F alongside Bradford City, Grimsby Town and Manchester City U21 After finishing second in the group, they were drawn away to Blackpool in the second round.

Pos	Div	Team	Pld	W	PW	PL	L	GF	GA	GD	Pts	Qualification
1	L2	Bradford City	3	3	0	0	0	10	2	+8	9	Advance to Round 2
2	L1	Barnsley	3	2	0	0	1	6	6	0	6	Advance to Round 2
3	ACA	Manchester City U21	3	0	1	0	2	3	8	−5	2	
4	L2	Grimsby Town	3	0	0	1	2	3	6	−3	1	

Updated to match(es) played on 31 October 2023. Source: EFL.com

Win Draw Loss Fixtures

5 September 2023 Group stage	Barnsley	2–0	Grimsby Town	Barnsley
19:30 BST	Dodgson 33'; Marsh 90+1'	Report		Stadium: Oakwell; Attendance: 2,439; Referee: Ruebyn Ricardo

26 September 2023 Group stage	Barnsley	3–1	Manchester City U21	Barnsley
19:30 BST	McCarthy 26'; Shepherd (yellow card) 27'; Russell 31'; Nzondo 79'	Report	Noble (yellow card) 30'; Dickson 43'; Samuel (yellow card) 90+5'	Stadium: Oakwell; Attendance: 2,051; Referee: Martin Woods

21 November 2023 Group stage	Bradford City	5–1	Barnsley	Bradford
19:30 GMT	Platt 2'; Cook 17'; Smith 35'; Halliday (yellow card) 37'; Chapman (yellow card) 42'; Doyle (yellow card) 45'; Smallwood (yellow card) 55'; Richards 63'; Oduor 66'	Report	Yoganathan (yellow card) 13'; Dodgson (yellow card) 60'; Cotter 77'; Shepherd (red card) 90+4'	Stadium: Valley Parade; Attendance: 1,770; Referee: Will Finnie

5 December 2023 Second round	Blackpool	2–1	Barnsley	Blackpool
19:00 GMT	Dale 50'; Beesley 62'	Report	McAtee 41'; Watters (yellow card) 90+5'	Stadium: Bloomfield Road; Attendance: 1,296; Referee: Daniel Middleton
