= Danny Benson =

English footballer (born 2003)

Personal information
- Full name: Daniel Richard Benson
- Date of birth: 15 November 2003 (age 22)
- Place of birth: England
- Position: Defender

Team information
- Current team: Mickleover

Youth career
- 2017–2022: Barnsley

Senior career*
Years	Team	Apps	(Gls)
2022–2024	Barnsley	0	(0)
2023	→ Bradford (Park Avenue)	2	(0)
2023	→ Bradford (Park Avenue)	1	(0)
2024	Matlock Town	3	(0)
2024–	Mickleover	1	(0)
- * Club domestic league appearances and goals as of 17:40, 1 October 2024 (UTC)

Daniel Richard Benson (born 15 November 2003) is an English professional footballer who plays as a defender for Northern Premier League Division One Midlands club Mickleover.

== Career ==
Benson joined the youth-team at Barnsley in October 2017 and signed as a first-year scholar in July 2020. He was called up to the first-team and was an unused substitute in an FA Cup tie with Barrow in January 2022. He turned professional at the club in July 2022. He made his senior debut on 30 August 2022, coming on as a 74th-minute substitute for Jasper Moon in a 3–0 EFL Trophy group stage defeat to Lincoln City at Oakwell.

In February 2023, Benson joined National League North side Bradford (Park Avenue) on a one-month youth loan. In October 2023, he returned to the club, now of the Northern Premier League Premier Division, on loan until January 2024.

Following the conclusion of the 2023–24 season, Benson was released by the club. In August 2024, he joined Northern Premier League Premier Division club Matlock Town. In September 2024, he joined Mickleover.

== Career statistics ==
As of match played 14 September 2024

Appearances and goals by club, season and competition
Club	Season	League			FA Cup		EFL Cup		Other		Total	
Club	Season	Division	Apps	Goals	Apps	Goals	Apps	Goals	Apps	Goals	Apps	Goals
Barnsley	2022–23	EFL League One	0	0	0	0	0	0	2 (Note: Appearance(s) in the EFL Trophy)	0	2	0
Barnsley	2023–24	League One	0	0	0	0	0	0	2	0	2	0
Barnsley	Total		0	0	0	0	0	0	4	0	4	0
Bradford (Park Avenue) (loan)	2022–23	National League North	2	0	0	0	—		0	0	2	0
Bradford (Park Avenue) (loan)	2023–24	NPL Premier Division	1	0	0	0	—		0	0	1	0
Bradford (Park Avenue) (loan)	Total		3	0	0	0	0	0	0	0	3	0
Matlock Town	2024–25	NPL Premier Division	3	0	2	0	—		0	0	5	0
Career total			6	0	2	0	0	0	4	0	12	0
