= Hayden Pickard =

English footballer (born 2005)

Personal information
- Full name: Hayden Pickard
- Date of birth: 23 August 2005 (age 21)
- Position: Defender

Team information
- Current team: Farsley Celtic (on loan from Barnsley)
- Number: 20

Youth career
- 2008–2022: Barnsley

Senior career*
Years	Team	Apps	(Gls)
2022–	Barnsley	0	(0)
2024–	→ Farsley Celtic (loan)	0	(0)
- * Club domestic league appearances and goals as of 14:35, 16 November 2024 (UTC)

Hayden Pickard (born 23 August 2005) is an English professional footballer who plays as a defender for Farsley Celtic on loan from EFL League One club Barnsley.

== Career ==
Pickard was named as Barnsley's Academy Player of the Season for the 2020–21 campaign. He made his first-team debut on 20 September 2022, coming on for Ziyad Larkeche as an 89th-minute substitute in a 2–0 win over Newcastle United U21 in an EFL Trophy group stage game at Oakwell.

On 15 November 2024, Pickard joined National League North side Farsley Celtic on loan.

== Career statistics ==
As of end of 2023–24 season

Appearances and goals by club, season and competition
Club	Season	League			FA Cup		EFL Cup		Other		Total	
Club	Season	Division	Apps	Goals	Apps	Goals	Apps	Goals	Apps	Goals	Apps	Goals
Barnsley	2022–23	League One	0	0	0	0	0	0	3 (Note: Appearance(s) in the EFL Trophy)	0	3	0
Barnsley	2023–24	League One	0	0	0	0	0	0	1	0	1	0
Career total			0	0	0	0	0	0	4	0	4	0
