= Emmaisa Nzondo =

English footballer

Personal information
- Date of birth: 21 January 2006 (age 20)
- Place of birth: Leeds, England
- Position: Forward

Team information
- Current team: Barnsley
- Number: 47

Youth career
- 2018–2022: Leeds United
- 2022–2023: Barnsley

Senior career*
Years	Team	Apps	(Gls)
2023–2025	Barnsley	0	(0)
- * Club domestic league appearances and goals as of 21:03, 24 December 2023 (UTC)

Emmaisa Nzondo (born 21 January 2006) is an English professional footballer who played as a forward for EFL League One club Barnsley.

== Career ==
Nzondo spent four years in the Academy at Leeds United, his hometown club, before joining the youth-system at Barnsley in 2022. He made his senior debut for Barnsley on 26 September 2023, scoring in a 3–1 win over Manchester City in an EFL Trophy group stage game at Oakwell. After the match he said that "I always dreamed of making my debut, but to also get a goal as well is special and I'm grateful to God no matter what I do, but it's a great honour".

== Personal life ==
His brother was stabbed to death.

== Career statistics ==
As of match played 21 November 2023

Appearances and goals by club, season and competition
Club	Season	League			FA Cup		EFL Cup		Other		Total	
Club	Season	Division	Apps	Goals	Apps	Goals	Apps	Goals	Apps	Goals	Apps	Goals
Barnsley	2023–24	EFL League One	0	0	0	0	0	0	2 (Note: Appearance/s in the EFL Trophy)	1	2	1
Career total			0	0	0	0	0	0	2	1	2	1
