= Aiden Marsh =

English footballer

Personal information
- Full name: Aiden Levi Marsh
- Date of birth: 5 May 2003 (age 23)
- Place of birth: Barnsley, England
- Height: 1.76 m (5 ft 9 in)
- Position: Forward

Team information
- Current team: Harrogate Town
- Number: 37

Youth career
- 2007–2011: Barnsley
- 2011–2014: Sheffield United
- 2014–2022: Barnsley

Senior career*
Years	Team	Apps	(Gls)
2022–2025	Barnsley	35	(4)
2022	→ Scunthorpe (loan)	3	(0)
2023	→ York City (loan)	7	(0)
2025	→ Raith Rovers (loan)	15	(3)
2025–2026	Truro City	5	(2)
2026–	Harrogate Town	2	(1)
- * Club domestic league appearances and goals as of 16:58, 23 January 2026 (UTC)

Aiden Levi Marsh (born 5 May 2003) is an English professional footballer who plays as a forward for National League club Harrogate Town.

== Club career ==
Marsh began playing football with the youth academy of Barnsley before moving to Sheffield United at the age of 8 where he played as a left-back. He returned to Barnsley's academy in 2014. He signed his first professional contract with the club on 11 September 2020. He made his professional debut with Barnsley coming on in the 78th minute for Matty Wolfe in a 0-1 EFL Championship loss to Bournemouth on 29 January 2022.

He made his senior debut for Barnsley on 29 January 2022, coming on as a substitute in a Championship fixture against AFC Bournemouth.

In September 2022, he joined Scunthorpe United on loan in the National League, followed by a loan to York City in September 2023.

In September 2023, Marsh joined National League club York City on an initial one-month loan deal, which was extended for a further month in October. He made seven appearances for York City before being recalled by Barnsley in November. While on-loan with York, his parent club, Barnsley played Horsham in the FA Cup, drawing the game 3–3. Having returned to Barnsley three days after the cup tie, Marsh featured in the replay which Barnsley won 0-3. As Football Association rules state that only players who are eligible for the initial FA Cup tie can feature in any replay, on 22 November Barnsley were expelled from the competition for fielding an ineligible player.

In January 2025, Marsh signed for Scottish Championship side Raith Rovers on loan. He made 17 league appearances, scoring 3 goals during his spell.

On 26 September 2025, Marsh joined National League club Truro City on a short-term contract until January 2026.

On 23 January 2026, Marsh joined League Two club Harrogate Town on a deal until the end of the season. On 15 May 2026 the club announced he was being released.

== International career ==
In November 2019, Marsh received a call-up to attend an England U17s training camp held at St George’s Park.

== Career statistics ==
As of 23 January 2026

Appearances and goals by club, season and competition
Club	Season	League			National cup (Note: Includes FA Cup and Scottish Cup)		League cup (Note: Includes EFL Cup and Scottish League Cup)		Other		Total	
Club	Season	Division	Apps	Goals	Apps	Goals	Apps	Goals	Apps	Goals	Apps	Goals
Barnsley	2021–22	Championship	4	1	1	0	0	0	—		5	1
Barnsley	2022–23	League One	4	0	0	0	1	0	1 (Note: Appearance(s) in EFL Trophy)	0	6	0
Barnsley	2023–24	League One	9	0	1	0	1	1	2	1	13	2
Barnsley	2024–25	League One	7	0	0	0	2	0	3	0	12	0
Barnsley	Total		24	1	2	0	4	1	6	1	36	3
Scunthorpe United (loan)	2022–23	National League	3	0	0	0	—		0	0	3	0
York City (loan)	2023–24	National League	7	0	0	0	—		0	0	7	0
Raith Rovers (loan)	2024–25	Scottish Championship	15	3	2	0	—		—		17	3
Truro City	2025–26	National League	5	2	0	0	—		1 (Note: Appearance(s) in National League Cup)	0	6	2
Harrogate Town	2025–26	League Two	2	1	0	0	—		0	0	2	1
Career total			56	7	4	0	4	1	7	1	69	9

== Honours ==
Individual

- Barnsley Academy Player of the Year: 2023–24
