= Herbie Kane =

English footballer

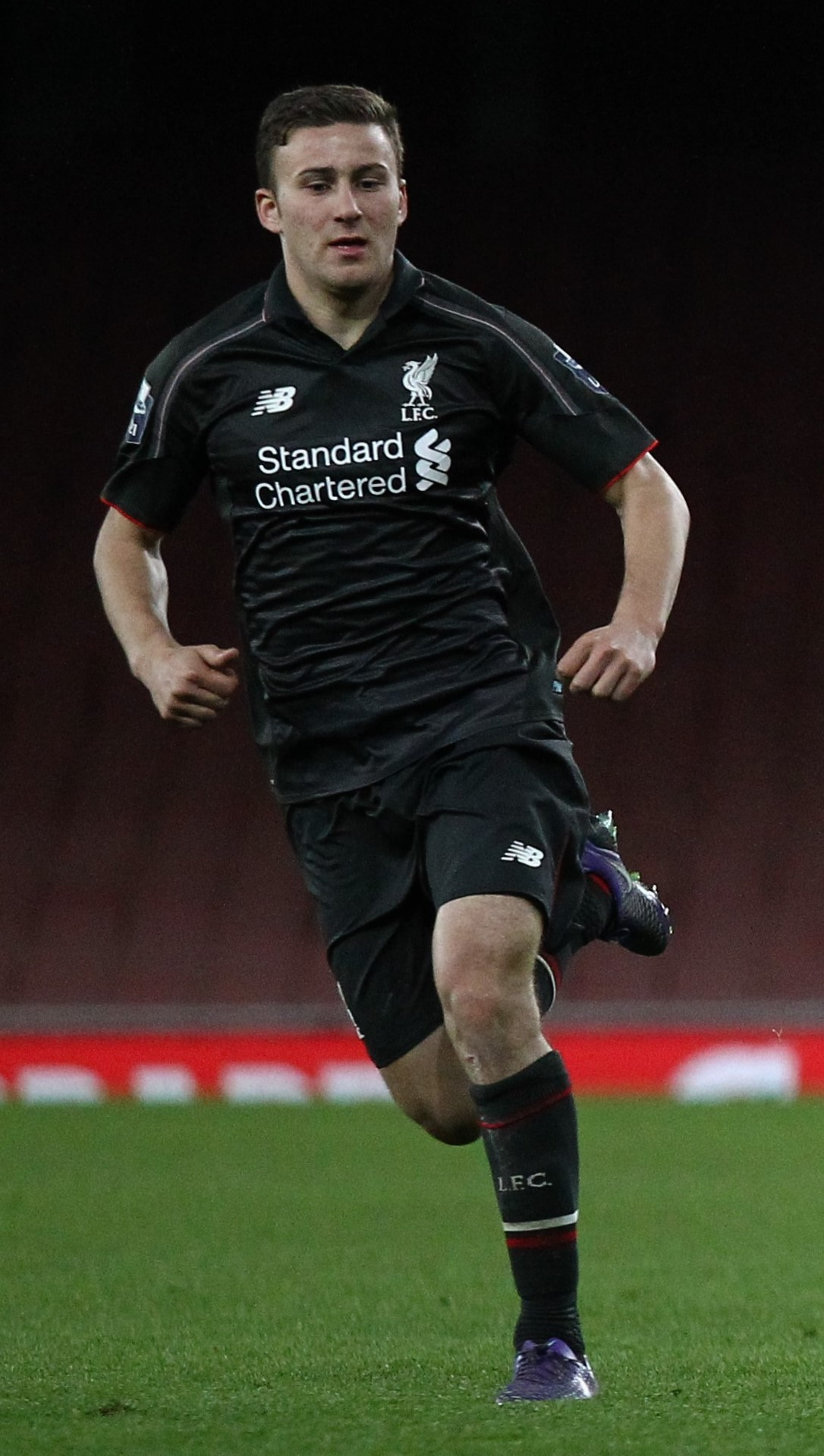
- Kane playing for Liverpool U18s in 2016

Personal information
- Full name: Herbie Kane
- Date of birth: 23 November 1998 (age 27)
- Place of birth: Bristol, England
- Height: 5 ft 10 in (1.77 m)
- Position: Midfielder

Team information
- Current team: Huddersfield Town
- Number: 16

Youth career
- Bristol City
- 2013–2018: Liverpool

Senior career*
Years	Team	Apps	(Gls)
2018–2020	Liverpool	0	(0)
2018–2019	→ Doncaster Rovers (loan)	38	(4)
2020	→ Hull City (loan)	7	(2)
2020–2024	Barnsley	105	(13)
2021–2022	→ Oxford United (loan)	35	(0)
2024–	Huddersfield Town	36	(4)
2026	→ Plymouth Argyle (loan)	8	(1)

International career
2015	England U17	8	(0)
- * Club domestic league appearances and goals as of 19:14, 3 April 2026 (UTC)

Herbie Kane (born 23 November 1998) is an English professional footballer who plays as a midfielder for EFL League One club Huddersfield Town.

== Club career ==
Born in Bristol, Kane began his career with Bristol City before moving to Liverpool at the age of 15. In July 2018, he was one of 100 young players nominated alongside Liverpool teammates Trent Alexander-Arnold and Ben Woodburn, for the Golden Boy award.

He signed on loan for Doncaster Rovers in August 2018. He made his English Football League debut on 11 August 2018. In December 2018, he signed a new contract with Liverpool, and also extended his Doncaster loan until the end of the season.

He made his competitive debut for Liverpool on 25 September 2019 in an EFL Cup match against Milton Keynes Dons.

On 3 January 2020, Kane joined Hull City on loan until the end of the season. He scored his first goal for Hull in a 3–3 draw with Birmingham City on 27 June 2020.

=== Barnsley ===
On 16 October 2020, he moved to Barnsley for a transfer fee of £1.25 million, signing a four-year contract.

On 30 August 2021, Kane joined Oxford United on loan until the end of the season.

Kane was released by Barnsley at the end of the 2023–24 season.

=== Huddersfield Town ===
On 2 July 2024, Kane signed for League One side Huddersfield Town on a three-year deal.

In January 2026 he signed on loan for Plymouth Argyle.

== International career ==
Kane has represented England at under-17 level.

== Playing style ==
Kane has been described by Liverpool as a "lively player in the middle of the park".

== Career statistics ==
As of 3 April 2026

Appearances and goals by club, season and competition
Club	Season	League			FA Cup		League Cup		Other		Total	
Club	Season	Division	Apps	Goals	Apps	Goals	Apps	Goals	Apps	Goals	Apps	Goals
Liverpool U21s	2019–20 EFL Trophy		—		—		—		2 (Note: Appearance(s) in the EFL Trophy.)	0	2	0
Liverpool	2018–19	Premier League	0	0	0	0	0	0	0	0	0	0
Liverpool	2019–20	Premier League	0	0	0	0	2	0	0	0	2	0
Liverpool	Total		0	0	0	0	2	0	0	0	2	0
Doncaster Rovers (loan)	2018–19	League One	38	4	6	3	1	0	4 (Note: Two appearances in the League One playoffs, two appearances in the EFL Trophy.)	0	49	7
Hull City (loan)	2019–20	Championship	7	2	2	0	0	0	0	0	9	2
Barnsley	2020–21	Championship	24	0	3	0	0	0	0	0	27	0
Barnsley	2021–22	Championship	0	0	0	0	1	0	0	0	1	0
Barnsley	2022–23	League One	40	4	3	0	0	0	5 (Note: Two appearances in the EFL Trophy, three appearances in the play-offs)	0	48	4
Barnsley	2023–24	League One	41	9	2	0	1	1	3 (Note: One appearance in the EFL Trophy, two appearances in the play-offs)	0	47	10
Barnsley	Total		105	13	8	0	2	1	8	0	123	14
Oxford United (loan)	2021–22	League One	35	0	1	0	0	0	1	0	37	0
Huddersfield Town	2024–25	League One	28	3	1	0	1	0	2	0	32	3
Huddersfield Town	2025–26	League One	8	1	0	0	1	0	0	0	9	1
Huddersfield Town	Total		36	4	1	0	2	0	2	0	41	4
Plymouth Argyle (loan)	2025–26	League One	8	1	0	0	0	0	0	0	8	1
Career total			229	24	18	3	7	1	17	0	270	28

== Honours ==
Individual

- EFL League One Player of the Month: December 2023
