= Josiah Dyer =

Montserratian footballer (born 2004)

Personal information
- Full name: Josiah Jude Emmanuel Dyer
- Date of birth: 24 September 2004 (age 22)
- Place of birth: Hammersmith & Fulham, England
- Position: Forward

Team information
- Current team: Stocksbridge Park Steels

Youth career
- 2013–2022: Barnsley

Senior career*
Years	Team	Apps	(Gls)
2022–2025	Barnsley	4	(0)
2023	→ F.C. United of Manchester (loan)	5	(1)
2023	→ Basford United (loan)	1	(0)
2024	→ Gainsborough Trinity (loan)	2	(0)
2025–2026	Peterborough Sports	8	(2)
2025–2026	→ Mickleover F.C. (loan)	27	(7)
2026–	Stocksbridge Park Steels	13	(3)

International career^{‡}
2023–	Montserrat	9	(1)
- * Club domestic league appearances and goals as of 12:16, 13 November 2026 (UTC) ‡ National team caps and goals as of 10:20, 24 March 2026 (UTC)

Josiah Jude Emmanuel Dyer (born 24 September 2004) is a professional footballer who plays as a forward for Stocksbridge Park Steels. Born in England, he plays for the Montserrat national team.

== Career ==
=== Barnsley ===
Dyer made his first-team debut for Barnsley on 11 October 2022, coming on for Slobodan Tedić as a 78th-minute substitute in a 4–2 win at Doncaster Rovers in an EFL Trophy group stage game.

On 6 January 2023 he joined F.C. United of Manchester for a one month loan.

On 21 August 2023, Dyer joined Northern Premier League Premier Division club Basford United on a short-term loan deal. On 26 September 2023, he was recalled from his loan and returned to Barnsley.

On 15 February 2025, Dyer made his league debut for the Tykes, replacing Stephen Humphreys as a late substitute in a 2–1 home defeat to Huddersfield Town.

He was released by Barnsley at the end of the 2024–25 season.

=== Non-League ===
In August 2025, Dyer joined National League North club Peterborough Sports.

In October 2025, Dyer joined Northern Premier League Division One Midlands club Mickleover F.C. on an initial one-month loan

== International career ==
Dyer is of Jamaican and Montserratian descent. The Jamaica U20s showed an interest in calling him up in April 2023. In November 2023, he was called up to the senior Montserrat national team for a set of 2023–24 CONCACAF Nations League matches, scoring on his debut against Barbados

== Personal life ==
He is the son of former professional footballer Bruce Dyer.

== Career statistics ==
=== Club ===
As of match played 14 March 2026

Appearances and goals by club, season and competition
Club	Season	League			FA Cup		EFL Cup		Other		Total	
Club	Season	Division	Apps	Goals	Apps	Goals	Apps	Goals	Apps	Goals	Apps	Goals
Barnsley	2022–23	League One	0	0	0	0	0	0	1 (Note: Appearance(s) in the EFL Trophy)	0	1	0
Barnsley	2023–24	League One	0	0	0	0	0	0	0	0	0	0
Barnsley	2024–25	League One	1	0	0	0	0	0	2	0	3	0
Barnsley	Total		1	0	0	0	0	0	3	0	4	0
F.C. United of Manchester (loan)	2022–23	NPL Premier Division	5	1	0	0	0	0	0	0	5	1
Basford United (loan)	2023–24	NPL Premier Division	1	0	0	0	0	0	0	0	1	0
Gainsborough Trinity (loan)	2024–25	NPL Premier Division	2	0	1	0	0	0	1 (Note: Appearance(s) in the FA Trophy)	0	4	0
Peterborough Sports	2025–26	National League North	8	2	0	0	0	0	0	0	8	2
Mickleover F.C. (loan)	2025–26	NPL Division One Midlands	25	5	0	0	0	0	2 (Note: Appearance(s) in the Derbyshire Senior Cup)	2	27	7
Career total			42	8	1	0	0	0	6	2	49	10

=== International ===
As of match played 18 November 2024

Appearances and goals by national team and year
National team	Year	Apps	Goals
Montserrat	2023	1	1
Montserrat	2024	8	0
Total		9	1

=== International goals ===
Scores and results list Montserrat's goal tally first.

No.	Date	Venue	Opponent	Score	Result	Competition
1.	20 November 2023	Blakes Estate Stadium, Look Out, Montserrat	Barbados	2–0	4–2	2023–24 CONCACAF Nations League B
