= Harrison Nejman =

English footballer (born 2003)

Personal information
- Date of birth: 8 September 2003 (age 23)
- Height: 1.78 m (5 ft 10 in)
- Position: Midfielder

Team information
- Current team: Barnsley
- Number: 31

Youth career
- 2017–2022: Barnsley

Senior career*
Years	Team	Apps	(Gls)
2022–	Barnsley	0	(0)
2023	→ Guiseley (loan)	0	(0)
- * Club domestic league appearances and goals as of 00:00, 11 October 2022 (UTC)

Harrison Nejman (born 8 September 2003) is an English professional footballer who plays as a midfielder for EFL League One club Barnsley.

== Career ==
Nejman joined the youth-team at Barnsley in October 2017 and signed as a first-team scholar in July 2020. He made his first-team debut on 20 September 2022, coming on for Adam Phillips as a half-time substitute in a 2–0 win over Newcastle United U21 in an EFL Trophy group stage game at Oakwell.

On 23 March 2023, he joined Northern Premier League Premier Division club Guiseley on loan until the end of the season.

== Career statistics ==
As of match played 11 October 2022

Club	Season	League			FA Cup		EFL Cup		Other		Total	
Club	Season	Division	Apps	Goals	Apps	Goals	Apps	Goals	Apps	Goals	Apps	Goals
Barnsley	2022–23	EFL League One	0	0	0	0	0	0	2 (Note: Appearance(s) in the EFL Trophy)	0	2	0
Career total			0	0	0	0	0	0	2	0	2	0
