= Theo Chapman =

English footballer

Personal information
- Full name: Theo Caleb Chapman
- Date of birth: 31 March 2005 (age 21)
- Height: 1.79 m (5 ft 10 in)
- Position: Midfielder

Team information
- Current team: Scarborough Athletic

Youth career
- 2013–2022: Barnsley

Senior career*
| Years | Team | Apps | (Gls) |
| 2022–2025 | Barnsley | 4 | (0) |
| 2023 | → Farsley Celtic (loan) | 5 | (0) |
| 2025– | Scarborough Athletic | 1 | (0) |
- * Club domestic league appearances and goals as of 10:01, 19 September 2025 (UTC)

Theo Caleb Chapman (born 31 March 2005) is an English professional footballer who plays as a midfielder for National League North club Scarborough Athletic.

== Early life ==
Chapman was a gymnast and actor who also did modelling work in his youth. Between 2016 and 2018, he starred in CBBC show Jamie Johnson.

== Career ==
Chapman made his debut for Barnsley on 26 November 2022, coming on as an 86th-minute substitute for Adam Phillips in a 3–0 win over Crewe Alexandra in an FA Cup match at Oakwell. He said he was grateful to manager Michael Duff for the experience and felt he "did alright" in the brief cameo. He signed a professional contract with the club at the end of the 2022–23 season.

In October 2023, Chapman joined National League North club Farsley Celtic on a one-month loan deal.

He was released by Barnsley upon the expiry of his contract at the end of the 2024–25 season.

In September 2025, Chapman joined National League North club Scarborough Athletic.

== Career statistics ==
As of match played 26 November 2022

Appearances and goals by club, season and competition
| Club | Season | League | | | FA Cup | | EFL Cup | | Other | | Total | |
| Club | Season | Division | Apps | Goals | Apps | Goals | Apps | Goals | Apps | Goals | Apps | Goals |
|---|---|---|---|---|---|---|---|---|---|---|---|---|
| Barnsley | 2022–23 | EFL League One | 0 | 0 | 1 | 0 | 0 | 0 | 0 | 0 | 1 | 0 |
| Career total | | | 0 | 0 | 1 | 0 | 0 | 0 | 0 | 0 | 1 | 0 |
