= 2025–26 FC Basel season =

Associan football season

FC Basel
2025–26 season
- Owner: FCB Holding; David Degen
- Club president: Reto Baumgartner
- Head coach: Ludovic Magnin (until 26 January); Stephan Lichtsteiner (from 26 January)
- Ground: St. Jakob-Park
- Swiss Super League: 5th
- Swiss Cup: Quarter-finals
- UEFA Champions League: Play-off round
- UEFA Europa League: League phase
- Top goalscorer: League: Xherdan Shaqiri (11); All: Xherdan Shaqiri (16)
- Highest home attendance: 30,859 (4 April 2026 vs Young Boys)
- Lowest home attendance: 23,562 (14 December 2025 vs Lausanne-Sport)
- Average home league attendance: 26,267
- Biggest win: 6–1 (16 August 2025 vs Biel-Bienne)
- Biggest defeat: 1–5 (26 October 2025 vs Lausanne-Sport); 0–4 (17 May 2026 vs Lugano)
Home colours	Away colours	Third colours

The 2025–26 season was FC Basel's 132nd season in their existence and the club's 31st consecutive season in the top flight of Swiss football since their promotion in the 1993–94 season. The 2025–26 Swiss Super League season started on 25 July 2025 and was completed on 17 May 2026. In addition to the Swiss Super League, Basel also participated in this season's edition of the Swiss Cup, entering in the third round. As Swiss champions, Basel qualified for the 2025–26 UEFA Champions League, where they entered in the play-off round.

== Club ==
=== FC Basel Holding AG ===
The FC Basel Holding AG owns 75% of FC Basel 1893 AG and the other 25% is owned by the club FC Basel 1893. The club FC Basel 1893 functions as a base club independent of the holding company and the AG. FC Basel 1893 AG is responsible for the operational business of the club, e.g. the first team, the women's first team, a part of the youth department and the back office are affiliated there. All decisions that affect the club FC Basel 1893 are made within the AG. The FC Basel 1893 AG has following board members: David Degen (president), Andreas Rey (vice-president), Ursula Rey-Krayer, Dan Holzmann, plus a delegate of the club FC Basel. Since 12 May 2025 this was the actual club president Reto Baumgartner.

On 12 May 2025 the AGM of the FC Basel Holding AG and the FC Basel 1893 AG were held and both boards were confirmed. The Holding AG with following members: David Degen (president), Andreas Rey (vice-president), Ursula Rey-Krayer and Dan Holzmann. Holzmann, by this time, had bought out the shares from his former co-investors, Johannes Barth, Marco Gadola, Dani Büchi. Further smaller Holding AG share holders had been Manor AG, Novasearch AG, MCH Group AG and Weitnauer Holding AG. But these has sold their shares back to the Holding AG in the meantime. The private Bank J.Safra Sarasin still held a small package of the shares.

On 25 September 2025 the club announced that Dan Holzmann was stepping down from his position in the directors board of the Holding AG. This because he had sold his shares to the brothers Jörg und Lukas Duschmalé. The Duschmalé brothers are fifth-generation members of the founding family of F.Hoffmann-La Roche AG. Jörg Duschmalé is a member of the Roche Board of Directors, and Lukas Duschmalé is a restaurant entrepreneur. They stated that they would not assume any operational or strategic tasks within the club.

=== Club management ===
Basel is the only professional club in Switzerland where the position of holding company's president and the club's president is not the same person. The club AGM also took place on 12 May 2025. All the existing members of the club's board were re-elected. These being Reto Baumgartner (club president), Carol Etter, Edward Turner, Tobias Adler, Andrea Häner-Roth and Nicole Leuthard, each unanimously without a vote against or an abstention. Due to Carol Etter's resignation as the club's delegate on the Board of Directors of the Holding AG, a new election was necessary. Club president Reto Baumgartner was nominated to succeed Etter and was elected to this position with an overwhelming majority.

The board of directors of the club are:

Club chairman	(Switzerland) Reto Baumgartner
Director	(Switzerland) Carol Etter
Director	(Switzerland) Edward Turner
Director	(Switzerland) Tobias Adler
Director	(Switzerland) Andrea Häner-Roth
Director	(Switzerland) Nicole Leuthard
Ground (capacity and dimensions)	St. Jakob-Park (37,994) (36,000 for international matches) / (120x80 m)

Updated to match played 6 May 2024
Source: FCB Official Site

=== Team management ===
On 15 May 2024 FCB announced that Daniel Stucki had been appointed as new sports director.

During the off-season, on 13 June 2025 the club announced that their head coach Fabio Celestini was leaving the club. They stated that the 49-year-old was retiring at his own request, after one and a half successful seasons, stating he would like to seek a new challenge.

As awaited by the local press, following this, on 16 June, FCB announced that Ludovic Magnin had signed a two-year contract as new FCB head-coach. One week later, on 21 June the remainer of the staff were named, following the departures of Davide Callà and Thomas Bernhard to the Swiss national football team.

On 26 January 2026 the club announced, that due to a lack of sporting development, FC Basel 1893 had decided to change the personelle of the head coach. Magnin was released immediately. Later, on the same day it was announced that the club had appointed Stephan Lichtsteiner as the new head coach of the first team. The 42-year-old, who already knows the club well from his work within the youth academy, had signed a contract until summer 2029. Pascal Bader (43) joined FCB as assistant coach alongside Lichtsteiner.

Position	Staff
Sport director	(Switzerland) Daniel Stucki since 15 May 2024
Head coach	(Switzerland) Ludovic Magnin until 26 January 2026
Head coach	(Switzerland) Stephan Lichtsteiner from 26 January 2026
Assistant coach	(Switzerland) Pascal Bader from 26 January 2026
Assistant coach	(Switzerland) Luigi Nocentini
Assistant coach	(Germany) Matthias Kohler
Athletics coach	(Switzerland) Carlos Menéndez
Athletics coach	(Switzerland) Roger Thöni
Goalkeeper coach	(Switzerland) Gabriel Wüthrich
Youth Team U-21 coach	(Switzerland) Mario Cantaluppi until November 2025
Youth Team U-21 coach	(Switzerland) Marco Walker since December 2025
Youth Team U-21 co-coach	(Switzerland) Erkan Aktas
Youth Team U-21 co-coach	(Switzerland) Michaël Bauch
Youth Team U-21 co-coach	(Switzerland) Theodoros Disseris

Source: FCB official site

== Overview ==
=== Off and pre-season ===
About an hour before the kick-off of Basel's last game of the previous season, on 24 May 2025, a supporting program began. This was an honoring and a farewell of their midfield player and former captain, their #34, Taulant Xhaka, who on that day, after appearing in 407 competitive matches for the RedBlue team, played his last league game for FCB and played for the last time in their home stadium Joggeli. Between the years 2010 and 2025, Xhaka played a total of 561 games for Basel's first team scoring a total of 10 goals. 280 of these games were in the Swiss Super League, 42 in the Swiss Cup, 85 in the UEFA competitions (Champions League, Europa League and Conference League) and 154 were friendly games. He scored 6 goals in the domestic league, 2 in the cup, 1 in the European games and the other 1 was scored during the test games. Xhaka had joined the club in 2002 at the age of ten. After advancing through their your department, Xhaka played his entire football career with FCB, with the exception of a one-and-a-half year loan to Grasshopper Club in 2012–13.

Philip Otele had been on loan to FCB from Al Wahda since January and his contract held a buy-out option. On 4 June FCB announced that they had decided to activate this option and Otele would remain with the club on a three-year contract. In that same announcement it also became clear that Romário Baró and Joe Mendes, who had both been in on loan the previous season, would return to their previous clubs Porto and Braga respectively.

On 12 June FC Basel 1893 announced that their former youth player Leon Avdullahu was moving to TSG 1899 Hoffenheim in the German Bundesliga. Hoffenheim confirmed the signing of Avdullahu on a long-term contract the same day. Avdullahu had moved from FC Solothurn to Basel's youth department in 2018. He regularly advanced from their U-14 to their U-21 team and celebrated winning the Swiss U-18 championship at the end of June 2023. In July 2023 he signed his first professional contract and advanced to their first team for their 2023–24 season. Then, a few months later, as Fabio Celestini became FCB head-coach, Avdullahu became a regular starter and at the end of the 2024–25 Swiss Super League season he became Swiss champion and Cup winner with them. During his two seasons with FCB's first team, Avdullahu played a total of 71 games for them, scoring a total of three goals. 63 of these games were in the Swiss Super League and 8 in the Swiss Cup. He scored two goals in the domestic league and the other was scored in the cup.

On 27 June, FCB announced that had signed Koba Koindredi in from Sporting CP on a one-year loan contract. Koindredi had played the previous season with Lausanne-Sport, also on loan. On the same day, 27 June, the club also announced that Bradley Fink had transferred out to Wycombe Wanderers in the League One, the third level of the English football league system. Between the years 2022 and 2025, which also included a one-year loan to Grasshopper Club, Fink played a total of 57 games for Basel scoring a total of 8 goals. 41 of these games were in the Swiss Super League, 7 in the Swiss Cup, 9 in the UEFA Conference League and he appeared in a further 13 friendly games. He scored six goals in the domestic league and two in the cup. He scored a further 5 Goals during the test games.

On 1 July, FCB announced that they had signed Keigo Tsunemoto from Servette on a three-year contract.

Then on 4 July a further player transfer and a further loan contract were confirmed. First, Arnau Comas, who had been on loan to Eibar transferred to Deportivo de La Coruña for an undisclosed fee. Then Đorđe Jovanović, who had been on loan to FK Partizan, moved on to Maccabi Haifa also on loan.

FCB announced on 17 July that they had reached an agreement with the City Football Group, who are the owners of ES Troyes, about a definite transfer of Metinho and that the player had signed in on a five-year contract. A further transfer in was Andrej Bačanin from FK Čukarički, from the Serbian Super League, to strengthen the FCB midfield. This was announced on 1 July 2025. Then FCB signed striker Moritz Broschinski in from VfL Bochum on 12 August. On 25 August the club announced that they had signed Jeremy Agbonifo in on loan from Lens until the end of the season. On 1 September another transfer announcement was made by the club, Flavius Daniliuc, an Austrian national player, was signed in from Salernitana to strengthen the FCB defence. On the same day Ibrahim Salah joined FCB with a four-year contract. Born in Belgium, he has represented Morocco at international level, he had been with Rennes before he signed for Basel.

In the other direction, on 25 July, the club announced that Roméo Beney had transferred out to Portuguese club Famalicão. On 30 July it was announced that Andrin Hunziker was loaned out to Winterthur until 30 June 2026 so that he could obtain further playing experience. On 18 August FCB announced that they were loaning out Gabriel Sigua to Lausanne-Sport until the end of the season. In a further announcement on the same day, the club stated that Kevin Carlos had signed a contract with OGC Nice and had left the team after just one season with them. On 19 August the club announced that Emmanuel Essiam had been loaned out until the end of the season to Francs Borains in Belgium.

On 25 August FCB announced that, after three years with the club, Anton Kade had left FC Basel 1893 and moved to FC Augsburg in the German Bundesliga. He played his last game for the FCB on 10 August in Lugano. In his time with the club, Kade played a total of 132 games for Basel scoring a total of 18 goals. 88 of these games were in the Swiss Super League, 12 in the Swiss Cup, 7 in the UEFA Conference League and 25 were friendly games. He scored 9 goals in the domestic league, 2 in the cup, 2 in the European games and the other 5 were scored during the test games.

=== Winter break ===
On the evening of 2 February 2026, FCB announced the departure of two players. The first was Philip Otele, who moved out on loan to Hamburger SV and the other was Jonas Adjetey who transferred to VfL Wolfsburg on a permanent basis.

== Players ==
=== First-team squad ===
The following is the list of the Basel first team squad. It also includes players that were in the squad the day the season started on 26 July 2025, but subsequently left the club after that date.

Note: Flags indicate national team as defined under FIFA eligibility rules; some limited exceptions apply. Players may hold more than one non-FIFA nationality.

No.	Pos.	Nation	Player
1	GK	SUI	Marwin Hitz (vice-captain)
3	DF	SUI	Nicolas Vouilloz
5	MF	BRA	Metinho
6	DF	JPN	Keigo Tsunemoto
7	FW	NGR	Philip Otele (out in February)
8	MF	FRA	Koba Koindredi
9	FW	ESP	Kevin Carlos (out)
9	FW	SWE	Jeremy Agbonifo
10	FW	SUI	Xherdan Shaqiri (captain)
11	FW	CIV	Bénie Traoré
13	GK	SUI	Mirko Salvi
14	MF	SRB	Andrej Bačanin
16	GK	SUI	Tim Spycher
17	FW	SUI	Andrin Hunziker (on loan to Winterthur)
17	FW	GER	Moritz Broschinski
18	MF	GHA	Emmanuel Essiam (on loan to Royal Francs Borains)
19	FW	CRO	Marin Šotiček
21	MF	GEO	Gabriel Sigua (out)
21	FW	MAR	Ibrahim Salah

No.	Pos.	Nation	Player
22	MF	FRA	Léo Leroy
23	FW	SUI	Albian Ajeti
24	DF	AUT	Flavius Daniliuc
25	DF	SUI	Finn van Breemen
26	DF	BIH	Adrian Leon Barišić
27	DF	SUI	Kevin Rüegg
28	MF	SUI	Dion Kacuri
29	MF	GER	Adriano Onyegbule (U-21)
29	DF	FRA	Moussa Cissé
30	FW	GER	Anton Kade (out)
31	MF	SUI	Dominik Schmid (vice-captain)
32	DF	GHA	Jonas Adjetey (out in February)
33	MF	ARG	Juan Gauto (U-21)
37	FW	SUI	Giacomo Koloto (from U-21)
39	MF	SUI	Arlet Junior Zé (out on loan to Midtjylland)
43	DF	SUI	Marvin Akahomen (U-21)
46	FW	BRA	Kaio Eduardo (U-21)
48	FW	FRA	Aaron Akalé (U-21)
49	GK	GER	Tim Pfeiffer (U-21)

=== Players in on loan ===
Note: Flags indicate national team as defined under FIFA eligibility rules; some limited exceptions apply. Players may hold more than one non-FIFA nationality.

No.	Pos.	Nation	Player
8	MF	FRA	Koba Koindredi (on loan from Sporting CP)
9	FW	SWE	Jeremy Agbonifo (on loan from Lens)

=== Players out on loan ===
Note: Flags indicate national team as defined under FIFA eligibility rules; some limited exceptions apply. Players may hold more than one non-FIFA nationality.

No.	Pos.	Nation	Player
7	FW	NGR	Philip Otele (loaned out to Hamburger SV in February)
18	MF	GHA	Emmanuel Essiam (on loan to Francs Borains until 30 June 2026)
-	FW	SUI	Andrin Hunziker (on loan to Winterthur until 30 June 2026)
-	FW	SRB	Đorđe Jovanović (loan to Maccabi Haifa until 30 June 2026)
39	FW	SUI	Arlet Junior Zé (to Midtjylland until 30 June 2026)
21	MF	GEO	Gabriel Sigua (on loan to Lausanne-Sport until 30 June 2026)

=== Transfers in ===
Note: Flags indicate national team as defined under FIFA eligibility rules; some limited exceptions apply. Players may hold more than one non-FIFA nationality.

No.	Pos.	Nation	Player
5	MF	BRA	Metinho (definite transfer from Troyes following loan)
6	DF	JPN	Keigo Tsunemoto (Transfer from Servette)
7	FW	NGR	Philip Otele (definite transfer from Al Wahda following loan)
14	MF	SRB	Andrej Bačanin (Transfer in from FK Čukarički)
17	FW	GER	Moritz Broschinski (Transfer in from VfL Bochum)
21	FW	MAR	Ibrahim Salah (Transfer in from Rennes)
24	DF	AUT	Flavius Daniliuc (Transfer in from Salernitana)

=== Transfers out ===
Note: Flags indicate national team as defined under FIFA eligibility rules; some limited exceptions apply. Players may hold more than one non-FIFA nationality.

No.	Pos.	Nation	Player
8	MF	POR	Romário Baró (returned to Porto following loan)
9	FW	ESP	Kevin Carlos (to OGC Nice)
14	FW	SUI	Bradley Fink (to Wycombe Wanderers)
17	MF	SWE	Joe Mendes (returned to Braga following loan)
30	FW	GER	Anton Kade (transfer to FC Augsburg)
32	DF	GHA	Jonas Adjetey (transfer to VfL Wolfsburg in February)
35	FW	SUI	Roméo Beney (to Famalicão)
37	MF	SUI	Leon Avdullahu (to Hoffenheim)
-	DF	ESP	Arnau Comas (transfer to Deportivo de La Coruña)

== Results and fixtures ==
Kickoff times are in CET.

=== Legend ===
Win Draw Loss Postponed

=== Friendly matches ===
==== Pre-season ====
5 July 2025 Friendly	SC Rheindorf Altach	1–1	Basel	Sportanlage Walgaubad, Nenzing
15:00	Fetahu 82' (pen.)	FCB report	69' Ajeti	Referee: (Austria) Stefan Macanovic
Note: Fair game, no yellow cards

10 July 2025 Friendly	FC Rapperswil-Jona	2–4	Basel	Stadion Grünfeld, Jona
18:00	Kamberi 7'; Saliji 19'	FCB report	1' Ajeti; 26' Otele; 48' Traoré; 70' Carlos	Attendance: 2,438; Referee: (Switzerland) Lukas Fähndrich
Note: Fair game, no yellow cards

12 July 2025 Friendly	Basel	1–1	Winterthur	Youth Campus Basel, Münchenstein
13:00	Shaqiri (penalty missed) 63′ Adjetey 64'	FCB report	34' (pen.) Di Giusto	Attendance: 0 Referee: (Switzerland) Mirel Turkes
Note: Fair game, no yellow cards. Due to capacity and safety reasons played behind closed doors.

16 July 2025 Friendly	Basel	1–1	FC Wil	Youth Campus Basel, Münchenstein
13:00	Schmid 24'	FCB summary	68' Bytyqi	Attendance: 0 Referee: (Switzerland)
Note: Fair game, no yellow cards. Due to capacity and safety reasons played behind closed doors.

19 July 2025 Friendly	Basel	1–1	Schaffhausen	Youth Campus Basel, Münchenstein
11:00	Hunziker 38' (1:0)	FCB report	88' (1:1) Gegaj	Attendance: 0 Referee: (Switzerland) Logan Berchier
Note: Fair game, no yellow cards. Due to capacity and safety reasons played behind closed doors.

19 July 2025 Friendly	Basel	3–3	Villarreal CF	Stadion Schnabelholz
13:00	Shaqiri 12'; Ajeti 27'; Carlos 65'; Traoré (yellow card) 83'	FCB report	24' (o.g.) Ajeti; 32' Pérez; (yellow card) 68' Gueye; 87' Danjuma; (yellow card) 90+1' Yeremy	Attendance: 1,000; Referee: (Austria) Matthias Gächter

==== Winter break and mid season ====
6 January 2026 Friendly	Basel	4–3	Slavia Prague	Marbella
15:00	Ajeti 8' (1:0); Shaqiri 65' (2:2); Eduardo 82' (3:2); Salah 87' (pen.)	FCB summary	39' (1:1) Cham; 43' (1:2) Schranz; 90+1' (4:3) Isife	Attendance: 100; Referee: (Spain) Marcos Rodríguez Marín

9 January 2026 Friendly	Basel	5–6	SV Elversberg	Marbella
14:30	Shaqiri 9' (1:1); Leroy 28' (2:2); Junior Zé 88' (2:3); Šotiček 100' (4:6); Kacuri 115' (5:6)	FCB summary	3' (0:1) Mokwa; 12' (1:2) Conté; 31' (2:3) Rohr; 47' (2:4) Mokwa; 90' (3:5) Adam; 99' (3:6) Schnellbacher	Attendance: 100; Referee: (Spain) Alberto Sevillano Marín
Note: The match was played in two 60-minute halves. Fair game, no yellow cards. A minute's silence was observed before kickoff in memory of the victims of the Crans-Montana fire disaster; FC Basel wore black armbands in respect.

26 March 2026 Mid-season Friendly	Basel	2–5	Vaduz	Youth Campus Basel, Münchenstein
13:00	Senaya 5' (1:0); Ajeti 37' (2:1)	FCB summary	26' (1:1) Campos; 66' (2:2) De Donno; 76' (2:2) Monsberger; 78' (2:4)Beyer; 82' (2:5) Monsberger	Attendance: behind closed doors Referee: (Switzerland) Johannes von Mandach

=== Swiss Super League ===
The 2025–26 Super League season was the 129th season of top-tier competitive football in Switzerland. The Swiss Football League (SFL) drew and published the fixtures of the first 22 rounds on 20 June 2025. The rest were to be drawn at a later date.

==== First and second round ====
26 July 2025 1	St. Gallen	2–1	Basel	Kybunpark, St. Gallen
18:00	Görtler (yellow card) 21'; Görtler 56' (1:1); Geubbels 75' (2:1); Owusu (yellow card) 90'	FCB summary	(yellow card) 14' Leroy; 40' (og 0:1) Görtler; (yellow card) 62' Koindredi; (yellow card) 72' Shaqiri	Attendance: 19,555; Referee: (Switzerland) Urs Schnyder

2 August 2025 2	Basel	2–1	Grasshopper Club	St. Jakob-Park, Basel
20:30	Otele; Otele (yellow card) 58'; Otele 75' (Shaqiri); Leroy (yellow card) 77'	FCB summary	(yellow card) 13' Imourane; (yellow card) 24' Muci; (yellow card) 29' Decarli; 69' (Zvonarek) Paskotši; (yellow card) 78' Paskotši	Attendance: 25,556; Referee: (Switzerland) Sven Wolfensberger

6 August 2025 4	Basel	4–1	Young Boys	St. Jakob-Park, Basel
20:30	Shaqiri; Leroy (yellow card) 45'; Magnin (yellow card) 45'; Ajeti (yellow card) 45+3'; Schmid (yellow card) 59'; Shaqiri 60' (pen); Carlos 75' (Otele); Adjetey (yellow card) 71'; Metinho 90+1' (Tsunemoto)	FCB summary	(yellow card) 14' Benito; 17' (Fernendes) Maleš; (red card) 58' Fernandes; (yellow card) 59' Keller; (yellow card) 68' Athekame; (yellow card) 83' Monteiro	Attendance: 26,978; Referee: (Switzerland) Luca Cibelli
Note: This match was pulled forward from 23 August.

10 August 2025 3	Lugano	3–1	Basel	Cornaredo, Lugano
16:30	Grgić 11' (pen); Papadopoulos 31' (Steffen); Grgić (yellow card) 55'; Koutsias (yellow card) 87'; Koutsias 90+6' (Daniel Dos Santos)	FCB summary	(yellow card) 29' Kade; (yellow card) 39' Metinho; 63' Ajeti (Otele); (yellow card) 90+4' Shaqiri	Attendance: 4,256; Referee: (Switzerland) Mirel Turkes

30 August 2025 5	Sion	0–1	Basel	Stade Tourbillon, Sion
20:30	Lukembila (yellow card) 42'; Chouaref (yellow card) 66'; Kronig (yellow card) 77'; Bouchlarhem (yellow card) 77'	FCB summary	14' (0:1) Junior Zé; (yellow card) 23' Leroy; (yellow card) 31' Schmid	Attendance: 13,500; Referee: (Switzerland) Sven Wolfensberger

13 September 2025 6	Thun	1–3	Basel	Stockhorn Arena, Thun
18:00	Meichtry (yellow card) 36'; Reichmuth (yellow card) 40'; Heule 73' (1:2); Montolio (red card) 78'; Matoshi (yellow card) 90+1' (yellow card)	FCB summary	24' (0:1) Shaqiri; 41' (0:2) Ajeti; (yellow card) 85' Metinho; (yellow card) Broschinski; 90+8' (pen 1:3) Shaqiri	Attendance: 10,014; Referee: (Switzerland) Lionel Tschudi (Neuchâtel)

28 September 2025 7	Basel	1–2	Luzern	St. Jakob-Park, Basel
16:30	Schmid 53' (1:1)	FCB summary	15' (0:1) Owusu; 55' (1:2) Ferreira; (yellow card) 59' Dorn; (yellow card) 64' Nocentini (co-trainer not on pitch); (yellow card) 90+7' Loretz	Attendance: 29,958; Referee: (Switzerland) Alessandro Dudic

5 October 2025 8	Servette	0–3	Basel	Stade de Genève, Geneva
16:30	Cognat (yellow card) 28'	FCB summary	5' (0:1) Ajeti; (yellow card) 17' Agbonifo; 41' (0:2) Otele; (yellow card) 45+1' Barišić; 59' (0:3) Otele	Attendance: 12,120; Referee: (Switzerland) Anojen Kanagasingam

18 October 2025 9	Basel	3–0	Winterthur	St. Jakob-Park, Basel
18:00	Leroy 4' (1:0); Otele (yellow card) 16'; Shaqiri 30' (2:0); Daniliuc 33' (3:0)	FCB summary	(yellow card) 29' Citherlet; (yellow card) 47' Jankewitz; (yellow card) 49' Martins; (yellow card) 56' Sahita	Attendance: 25,500; Referee: (Switzerland) Urs Schnyder

26 October 2025 10	Lausanne-Sport	5–1	Basel	Stade de la Tuilière, Lausanne
16:30	Bair 6' (1:0); Custodio 17' (pen.); Bair 35' (3:0); Diakité (yellow card) 55'; Diakité 55' (4:0); Ajdini 66' (5:0)	FCB summary	(yellow card) 16' Ajeti; (yellow card) 62' Metinho; 85' (pen 5:1) Traoré; (yellow card) 89' Šotiček	Attendance: 7,956; Referee: (Switzerland) Lionel Tschudi (Neuchâtel)

29 October 2025 11	Basel	2–0	Zürich	St. Jakob-Park, Basel
20:30	Traoré 13' (1:0); Vouilloz (yellow card) 42'; Salah 50' (2:0); Salah (yellow card) 76'	FCB summary	(yellow card) 12' Ligue; (yellow card) 39' Comenencia	Attendance: 27,073; Referee: (Switzerland) Lukas Fähndrich

2 November 2025 12	Young Boys	0–0	Basel	Stadion Wankdorf, Bern
16:30	Gigović (yellow card) 33' (yellow-red card) 48'	FCB summery	(yellow card) 56' Traoré; (yellow card) 86' Broschinski; (yellow card) 90+3' Rüegg; (yellow card) 90+4' Shaqiri	Attendance: 31,500; Referee: (Switzerland) Fedayi San (Gebenstorf)

9 November 2025 13	Basel	0–1	Lugano	St. Jakob-Park, Basel
14:00	Metinho (yellow card) 45'	FCB summery	(yellow card) 8' Papadopoulos; 62' (0:1) Behrens; (yellow card) 84' Saipi; (yellow card) 86' El Wafi	Attendance: 27,676; Referee: (Switzerland) Urs Schnyder

23 November 2025 14	Grasshopper Club	1–1	Basel	Letzigrund, Zürich
16:30	Ullmann 13' (1:0); Marques (yellow card) 44' (yellow-red card) 74'; Stroscio (yellow card) 63' (yellow-red card) 90'; Arigoni (yellow card) 82'	FCB summary	33' (1:1) Traoré; (yellow card) 61' (yellow-red card) 64' Bačanin	Attendance: 7,900; Referee: (Switzerland) Luca Piccolo

30 November 2025 15	Basel	0–0	St. Gallen	St. Jakob-Park, Basel
16:30		FCB summary	(yellow card) 26' Stanić; (yellow card) 34' May; (yellow card) 80' Vallçi; (yellow card) 81' Witzig	Attendance: 27,666; Referee: (Switzerland) Sandro Schärer (Buttikon)

7 December 2025 16	Winterthur	1–2	Basel	Schützenwiese, Winterthur
14:00	Hunziker 51' (1:1); Arnold (yellow card) 69'; Zuffi (yellow card) 73'	FCB summary	29' (0:1) Shaqiri; (penalty missed) 65′ Otele; 90+3' (1:2) Tsunemoto	Attendance: 8,700 (sold out); Referee: (Switzerland) Lukas Fähndrich
Note: 43rd minute: shot from Goillard hits the post; 62nd minute: shot from Maluvunu hits the post; 65th minute: Kapino saves Otele's penalty.

14 December 2025 17	Basel	0–0	Lausanne-Sport	St. Jakob-Park, Basel
16:30	Tsunemoto (yellow card) 53'; Adjetey (yellow card) 65'	FCB summary	(yellow card) 26' Roche; (yellow card) 28' Abdallah; (red card) 59' Lekweiry; (yellow card) 84' (yellow-red card) 90+5' Soppy	Attendance: 23,562; Referee: (Switzerland) Nico Gianforte

17 December 2025 18	Luzern	1–2	Basel	Swissporarena, Luzern
20:30	Winkler (yellow card) 16'; Fernandes (yellow card) 39'; Von Moos 54' (1:1); Von Moos (yellow card) 63'; Knezevic (yellow card) 87'	FCB summary	(penalty missed) 18′ Shaqiri; (yellow card) 21' Traoré; (yellow card) 28' Leroy; 49' (0:1) Broschinski; (penalty scored) 75′ (1:2) Koindredi; (yellow card) 83' Šotiček	Attendance: 11,703; Referee: (Switzerland) Luca Piccolo

20 December 2025 19	Basel	1–1	Servette	St. Jakob-Park, Basel
20:30	Otele (yellow card) 42'; Traoré 64' (1:1); Salah (yellow card) 90+4'	FCB summary	29' (0:1) Guillemenot; (yellow card) 33' Cognat; (yellow card) 51' Allix; (yellow card) 68' Rouiller; (yellow card) 85' Ishuayed	Attendance: 24,103; Referee: (Switzerland) Sven Wolfensberger

18 January 2026 20	Basel	1–1	Sion	St. Jakob-Park, Basel
16:30	Daniliuc 4' (1:0); Eduardo (yellow card) 50'; Koindredi (yellow card) 90+2'	FCB summary	58' (1:1) Chipperfield; (yellow card) 90' Lukembila; (yellow card) 90+1' Hefti	Attendance: 23,886; Referee: (Switzerland) Sven Wolfensberger
Note: A minute's silence was observed before kickoff in remembrance of the victims of the Crans-Montana fire disaster. Both teams and the refereeing trio wore black armbands.

25 January 2026 21	Zürich	3–4	Basel	Letzigrund, Zürich
16:30	Phaëton 1' (1:0); Phaëton (yellow card) 2'; Kény 43' (2:1); Reverson 64' (3:3); Kény (yellow card) 70'; Di Giusto (yellow card) 74'	FCB summary	11' (1_1) Shaqiri; (yellow card) 42' Ajeti; (yellow card) 44' Shaqiri; 45+3' (2:2) Shaqiri; 51' (2:3) Otele; (yellow card) 80' Koindredi; 90+4' (3:4) Shaqiri	Attendance: 18,878; Referee: (Switzerland) Fedayi San (Gebenstorf)

1 February 2026 22	Basel	1–2	Thun	St. Jakob-Park, Basel
16:30	Schmid 57' (1:1); Leroy (yellow card) 90+4'	FCB summary	15' (0:1) Bertone; (yellow card) 28' Meichtry; (yellow card) 49' Fehr; 80' (1:2) Matoshi	Attendance: 26,374; Referee: (Switzerland) Sven Wolfensberger
Note: FCB-Debüt für Giacomo Koloto.

==== Third round ====
The fixtures and dates for the third round were announced on 20 December 2025.

8 February 2026 Round 23	Basel	2–1	Zürich	St. Jakob-Park, Basel
16:30	Leroy (yellow card) 36'; Shaqiri 90' (pen.); Salah 90+6' (2:1)	FCB summary	(yellow card) 5' Sauter; 16' (0:1) Sauter; (yellow card) 85' Reverson; (yellow card) 88' Comenencia; (yellow card) 89' Nvendo; (yellow card) 89' Palacio	Attendance: 28,790; Referee: (Switzerland) Urs Schnyder

12 February 2026 Round 24	Sion	2–0	Basel	Stade Tourbillon, Sion
20:30	Hajrizi (yellow card) 3'; Chipperfield (yellow card) 16'; Chouaref 41' (1:0); Kronig 54' (2:0); Batata (yellow card) 65'; Kronig (yellow card) 66'	FCB summary	(yellow card) 41' Rüegg	Attendance: 6,300; Referee: (Switzerland) Anojen Kanagasingam

15 February 2026 Round 25	Basel	1–1	Lugano	St. Jakob-Park, Basel
16:30	Traoré 30' (pen.); (yellow card) 37' Salah; (yellow card) 48' Schmid	FCB summary	(yellow card) 56' Kelvin; 64' (1:1) Koutsias; (yellow card) 72' Cimignani; (yellow card) 90+2' Papadopoulos	Attendance: 22,715; Referee: (Switzerland) Fedayi San (Gebenstorf)

22 February 2026 Round 26	Luzern	4–2	Basel	Swissporarena, Luzern
16:30	Dorn 30' (1:0); Kabwit 77' (2:2); Villiger 83' (3:2); Kabwit 89' (4:2)	FCB summary	45' (pen.) Traoré; 63' (1:2) Duranville; (yellow card) 90+5' Tsunemoto	Attendance: 13,472; Referee: (Switzerland) Alessandro Dudic

1 March 2026 Round 27	Lausanne-Sport	1–2	Basel	Stade de la Tuilière, Lausanne
14:00	Janneh 55' (1:1)	FCB summary	1' (0:1) Koloto; (yellow card) 40' Cissé; (yellow card) 47' Metinho; 68' (1:2) Koloto	Attendance: 6,695; Referee: (Switzerland) Anojen Kanagasingam

5 March 2026 Round 28	Basel	1–0	Grasshopper Club	St. Jakob-Park, Basel
20:30	Traoré 51' (1:0); Stephan Lichtsteiner (head coach) (yellow card) 68'; Cissé (yellow card) 90+4'; Koindredi (yellow card) 90+5'	FCB summary	(yellow card) 74' Mikulić; (yellow card) 75' Frey; (yellow card) 90+4' Ngom; (red card) 90+5' Abrashi	Attendance: 23,149; Referee: (Switzerland) Luca Cibelli

8 March 2026 Round 29	St. Gallen	3–0	Basel	Kybunpark, St. Gallen
14:00	Okoroji 9'; Okoroji 15'; Boukhalfa 30'; Stanić (yellow card) 61'	FCB summary		Attendance: 19,115; Referee: (Switzerland) Urs Schnyder

15 March 2026 Round 30	Basel	3–1	Servette	St. Jakob-Park, Basel
16:30	Schmid 45' (1:0); Metinho 48' (2:0); Metinho 90' (3:1)	FCB summary	(yellow card) 48' Allix; (yellow card) 61' Mendes; 88' (2:1) Mráz	Attendance: 24,545; Referee: (Switzerland) Nico Gianforte

22 March 2026 Round 31	Winterthur	0–2	Basel	Schützenwiese, Winterthur
14:00	Kryeziu (yellow card) 19'; Arnold (yellow card) 57'	FCB summary	(yellow card) 1' Koloto; 15' (0:1) Salah; (yellow card) 19' Metinho; (yellow card) 23' (yellow-red card) 84' van Breemen; (yellow card) 45' Lichtsteiner (head-coach); (yellow card) 57' Vouilloz; 71' (0:2) Traoré	Attendance: 8,700 (sold-out); Referee: (Switzerland) Luca Piccolo

4 April 2026 Round 32	Basel	3–3	Young Boys	St. Jakob-Park, Basel
20:30	Lichtsteiner (yellow card) 27' (Lauper) 36' (o.g.); Shaqiri 41'; Traoré 68'; Metinho (yellow card) 74'	FCB summary	(yellow card) 22' Janko; 27' Fernandes; (yellow card) 29' Fernandes; (yellow card) 62' Monteiro; 64' (o.g.) (Daniliuc); 90' Colley	Attendance: 30,859; Referee: (Switzerland) Lukas Fähndrich
Note: Cautioned on the bench: 27th minute Stephan Lichtsteiner (FCB coach) for complaining – suspended for the next game.

11 April 2026 Round 33	Thun	P–P	Basel	Stockhorn Arena, Thun
20:30		Press release
Note: Fire in Basel's locker room area: Game cancelled

18 April 2026 Round 33	Thun	3–1	Basel	Stockhorn Arena, Thun
20:30	Montolio (yellow card) 14'; Ibayi 28' (1:0); Heule 53' (2:0); Rastoder 64' (3:1); Bürki (yellow card) 90+3'	FCB summary	(yellow card) 27' Salah; 56' (2:1) Duranville; (yellow card) 58' Leroy; (yellow card) 80' Shaqiri	Attendance: 10,014 (sold out); Referee: (Switzerland) Mirel Turkes
Note: The match was originally scheduled for 11 April 2026, however this was postponed due to the cabin fire at the St. Jakob-Park.

==== League table at split ====
Pos	Team	Pld	W	D	L	GF	GA	GD	Pts	Qualification or relegation (Note: Teams play each other three times (33 matches), before the league is split into two groups (the top six and the bottom six).)
1	Thun	33	24	2	7	75	37	+38	74	To championship group
2	St. Gallen	33	17	9	7	64	40	+24	60	To championship group
3	Lugano	33	16	9	8	50	38	+12	57	To championship group
4	Basel	33	15	8	10	51	45	+6	53	To championship group
5	Sion	33	13	13	7	51	35	+16	52	To championship group
6	Young Boys	33	13	9	11	65	60	+5	48	To championship group
7	Luzern	33	10	10	13	64	61	+3	40	To relegation group
8	Servette	33	9	13	11	57	57	0	40	To relegation group
9	Lausanne-Sport	33	10	9	14	47	57	−10	39	To relegation group
10	Zürich	33	10	4	19	45	63	−18	34	To relegation group
11	Grasshopper	33	6	9	18	40	65	−25	27	To relegation group
12	Winterthur	33	4	7	22	35	86	−51	19	To relegation group

Updated to match(es) played on 18 April 2026. Source: Brack Super League - Tabelle
Rules for classification: 1) Points; 2) Goal difference; 3) Goals scored; 4) Head-to-head goal difference; 5) Head-to-head goals scored 6) Away goals scored; 7) Draw.

==== Championship group ====
26 April 2026 Round 34	Basel	0–1	Sion	St. Jakob-Park, Basel
14:00	Broschinski (penalty missed) 74′	FCB summary	24' (0:1) Nivokazi; 60' (0:2) Lukembila; (yellow card) 73' Hajrizi	Attendance: 26,502; Referee: (Switzerland) Lukas Fähndrich
Note: 74th minute Anthony Racioppi saved the penalty from Broschinski.

2 May 2026 Round 35	Basel	3–1	Thun	St. Jakob-Park, Basel
20:30	Schmid (yellow card) 39'; Metinho 43' (1:1); Ajeti 86' (2:1); Koindredi 90+1' (3:1)	FCB summary	(yellow card) 25' (yellow-red card) 81' Fehr; (yellow card) 27' Matoshi; (yellow card) 39' Rastoder; 41' (0:1) Matoshi; (yellow card) 81' Lustrinelli (head-coach); (yellow card) 89' (yellow-red card) 89' Ibayi; (red card) 89' Ibayi	Attendance: 28,929; Referee: (Switzerland) Fedayi San (Gebenstorf)
Note: 89th minute, Christopher Ibayi received the first yellow card for a foul, the second yellow for complaining and the straight red card for unsportsmanship.

10 May 2026 Round 36	Young Boys	3–0	Basel	Stadion Wankdorf, Bern
16:30	Valery (yellow card) 27'; Pech 49' (1:0); Maleš 74' (2:0); Fassnacht 90+4' (3:0)	FCB summary	(yellow card) 18' Rüegg; (yellow card) 56' Koloto; (yellow card) 90+6' Cissé	Attendance: 28,580; Referee: (Switzerland) Sandro Schärer (Buttikon)

14 May 2026 Round 37	Basel	1–3	St. Gallen	St. Jakob-Park, Basel
16:30	Traoré (yellow card) 10'; Vouilloz (yellow card) 39'; Leroy (yellow card) 47'; Schmid (yellow card) 59'; Vouilloz 88' (1:2)	FCB summary	(yellow card) 10' Gaal; (yellow card) 13' Baldé; (yellow card) 50' Kleine-Bekel; 51' (0:1) Baldé; 78' (0:2) Boukhalfa; (yellow card) 87' Fazliji; 89' (1:3) Scherrer; (yellow card) 90+4' Okoroji	Attendance: 29,822; Referee: (Switzerland) Lukas Fähndrich

17 May 2026 Round 38	Lugano	4–0	Basel	Cornaredo, Lugano
16:30	Behrens 10' (1:0); Papadopoulos (yellow card) 30'; Behrens 36' (2:0); Steffen 52' (3:0); Koutsias 56' (4:0); Zanotti (yellow card) 85'	FCB summary	(yellow card) 27' Rüegg; (yellow card) 39' Bačanin	Attendance: 5,175; Referee: (Switzerland) Urs Schnyder

==== Final league table ====
Pos	Team	Pld	W	D	L	GF	GA	GD	Pts	Qualification or relegation (Note: Teams play each other three times (33 matches), before the league is split into two groups (the top six and the bottom six).)
1	Thun (C)	38	24	3	11	80	52	+28	75	Qualification for the Champions League second qualifying round
2	St. Gallen	38	20	10	8	72	47	+25	70	Qualification for the Europa League second qualifying round (Note: St. Gallen won the 2025–26 Swiss Cup and qualified for the Europa League second qualifying round as cup winners. Since they finished in the top three, the second Conference League berth was passed to the fourth-placed team, Sion.)
3	Lugano	38	19	10	9	59	42	+17	67	Qualification for the Conference League second qualifying round
4	Sion	38	16	15	7	63	40	+23	63	Qualification for the Conference League second qualifying round
5	Basel	38	16	8	14	55	58	−3	56	
6	Young Boys	38	15	10	13	80	69	+11	55	
7	Luzern	38	14	11	13	76	66	+10	53	
8	Servette	38	13	14	11	71	63	+8	53	
9	Lausanne-Sport	38	11	9	18	53	67	−14	42	
10	Zürich	38	11	5	22	49	72	−23	38	
11	Grasshopper (O)	38	8	9	21	48	74	−26	33	Qualification for the Relegation play-off
12	Winterthur (R)	38	5	8	25	44	100	−56	23	Relegation to 2026–27 Swiss Challenge League

Source: Brack Super League - Tabelle
Rules for classification: 1) Points; 2) Goal difference; 3) Goals scored; 4) Head-to-head goal difference; 5) Head-to-head goals scored 6) Away goals scored; 7) Draw.
(C) Champions; (O) Play-off winners; (R) Relegated

=== Swiss Cup ===
The fixtues and dates of the first round were drawn in June 2025.

16 August 2025 First round	Biel-Bienne	1–6	Basel	St. Jakob-Park, Basel
20:30	Doucouré (yellow card) 45'; Ssebunya (yellow card) 47'; Vasic 74'	Report	2' (o.g.) Monney; (yellow card) 18' Metinho; 24' Broschinski Shaqiri; 28' Otele Tsunemoto; 41' Shaqiri; 54' Šotiček; 64' Broschinski	Attendance: 16,323; Referee: (Switzerland) Désirée Grundbacher
Note: Biel-Bienne played this season in the 2025–26 Promotion League. This match was originally scheduled to be played in Biel/Bienne. However, since the Tissot Arena was unavailable for this encounter on the third weekend of August, a venue swap was arranged, this at the request of the home club.

19 September 2025 Second round	Étoile Carouge	2–2 (a.e.t.) (2–3 p)	Basel	Stade de la Fontenette, Carouge
19:00	Essiena 40' (yellow card) 26' (yellow-red card) 76'; Zrankeon (yellow card) 60'; El Jaouhari (yellow card) 68'; Antonio (yellow card) 88'; Sene 117'	FCB report	(penalty missed) 62′ Shaqiri; 90+3' Agbonifo; 97' Junior Zé; (yellow card) 104' Adjetey	Attendance: 3,105; Referee: (Switzerland) Johannes von Mandach
	Penalties
	Bua (penalty scored); Hysenaj (penalty scored); Maouche (Salvi saves) (penalty missed); Traoré (Salvi saves) (penalty missed); Sene (Salvi saves) (penalty missed)		(penalty scored) Shaqiri; (penalty scored) Metinho; (penalty scored) Broschinski; (penalty missed) Agbonifo
Note: Étoile Carouge played this season in the 2025–26 Swiss Challenge League.

4 December 2025 Third round	FC du Grand-Saconnex	3–1	Basel	St. Jakob-Park, Basel
18:30	Matuvunu 9' (1:1)	FCB summary	6' (0:1) Traoré; 58' (1:2) Otele; (yellow card) 61'Metinho; 68' (1:3) Traoré	Attendance: 25,778; Referee: (Switzerland) Luca Piccolo
Note: FC du Grand-Saconnex played this season in the 2025–26 Promotion League. This match was originally scheduled to be played in Grand-Saconnex. However, due to the fact that their home ground is much too small for this encounter, a venue swap was arranged, this at the request of the home club. FC Basel and their sponsor took over all the costs and invite all spectators in and that free of charge. Free entry sponsored by jersey sponsor Bitpanda.

4 February 2026 Quarter-final	St. Gallen	2–1	Basel	Kybunpark, St. Gallen
20:15	Baldé 1' (1:0); Stanić (yellow card) 16'; Görtler (yellow card) 45'; Gaal (yellow card) 55'; Boukhalfa 90+3' (2:1)	FCB summary	(yellow card) 51' Rüegg; 65' (1:1) Koloto; (yellow card) 87' Koloto	Attendance: 16,955; Referee: (Switzerland) Lukas Fähndrich

=== UEFA Champions League ===
==== Play-off round ====
20 Aug 2025 First Leg	Basel (Switzerland)	1–1	(Denmark) Copenhagen	Basel
14:00 CEST	Shaqiri 14' (pen.); Tsunemoto (yellow card) 28'; Adjetey (yellow card) 43' (yellow-red card) 82'; Leroy (yellow card) 45+2'; Barišić (yellow card) 90'	FCB summery	Huescas (yellow card) 12'; Pereira López 45+3'; (yellow card) 53' Lerager; (yellow card) 62' Larsson	Stadium: St. Jakob-Park; Attendance: 25,847; Referee: Anthony Taylor (England)

27 Aug 2025 Second Leg	Copenhagen (Denmark)	2–0 (3–1 agg.)	(Switzerland) Basel	Copenhagen, Denmark
21:00 CEST	Cornelius (Achouri) 46'; Moukoko 84' (pen.); Claesson (yellow card) 85'	FCB summery		Stadium: Parken; Attendance: 34,854; Referee: István Kovács (Romania)

=== UEFA Europa League ===
==== League Phase ====
===== Matches =====
24 September 2025 Matchday 1	SC Freiburg (Germany)	2–1	(Switzerland) Basel	Europa-Park Stadion, Freiburg im Breisgau
21:00	Osterhage 31'; Eggestein 57'	Report; FCB summery	84' Otele	Attendance: 34,300 (sold out); Referee: (Portugal) Luis Godinho

2 October 2025 Matchday 2	Basel (Switzerland)	2–0	(Germany) VfB Stuttgart	St. Jakob-Park, Basel
21:00	Ajeti 3'; Ajeti (yellow card) 30'; Schmid (yellow card) 69'; Salah (yellow card) 78'; Shaqiri 84'	Report; FCB summery		Attendance: 33,650; Referee: Davide Massa (Italy)

23 October 2025 Matchday 3	Lyon (France)	2–0	(Switzerland) Basel	Parc Olympique Lyonnais, Décines-Charpieu
18:45	Tolisso 3' (1:0); Niakhaté (yellow card) 89'; Moreira 90' (2:0)	Report; FCB summery	(yellow card) 45+3' Vouilloz	Attendance: 35,860; Referee: Manfredas Lukjančukas (Lithuania)

6 November 2025 Matchday 4	Basel (Switzerland)	3–1	(Romania) FCSB	St. Jakob-Park, Basel
18:45	Shaqiri 19' (pen.); Shaqiri 73' (2:1); Salah 88' (3:1)	Report; FCB summery	57' (1:1) Olaru	Attendance: 21,925; Referee: Juxhin Xhaja (Albania)

27 November 2025 Matchday 5	Genk (Belgium)	2–1	(Switzerland) Basel	Cegeka Arena, Genk
21:00	Oh Hyeon-gyu 14' (1:0); Karetsas 45+2' (2:0)	Report; FCB summary	57' (2:1) Otele	Attendance: 13,104; Referee: Orel Grinfeld (Israel)

11 December 2025 Matchday 6	Basel (Switzerland)	1–2	(England) Aston Villa	St. Jakob-Park, Basel
21:00	Daniliuc 34' (1:1)	Report; FCB summary	12' (0:1) Guessand; 53' (1:2) Tielemans	Attendance: 27,509; Referee: Halil Umut Meler (Turkey)

22 January 2026 Matchday 7	Red Bull Salzburg (Austria)	3–1	(Switzerland) Basel	Red Bull Arena, Salzburg
21:00	Alajbegović 4' (1:0); Alajbegović 12' (2:0); Krätzig 35' (3:0); Kitano (yellow card) 45'	Report; FCB summary	(yellow card) 37' Agbonifo; (yellow card) 40' Bačanin; (yellow card) 50' Vouilloz; 56' (3:1) Agbonifo	Attendance: 6,741; Referee: Anastasios Papapetrou (Greece)

29 January 2026 Matchday 8	Basel (Switzerland)	0–1	(Czech Republic) Viktoria Plzeň	St. Jakob-Park, Basel
21:00	Adjetey (yellow card) 33'; Rüegg (yellow card) 43'	Report; FCB summary	39' (0:1) Panoš; (yellow card) 68' Dweh; (yellow card) 90+3' Memić	Attendance: 20,454; Referee: Giorgi Kruashvili (Georgia)

===== League phase table =====
Pos	Team	Pld	W	D	L	GF	GA	GD	Pts
28	(Royal Dutch Football Association) Go Ahead Eagles	8	2	1	5	6	14	−8	7
29	(Royal Dutch Football Association) Feyenoord	8	2	0	6	11	15	−4	6
30	(Swiss Football Association) Basel	8	2	0	6	9	13	−4	6
31	(Austrian Football Association) Red Bull Salzburg	8	2	0	6	10	15	−5	6
32	(Scottish Football Association) Rangers	8	1	1	6	5	14	−9	4

Source: UEFA
Rules for classification: League phase tiebreakers

===== Results by round =====
Round	1	2	3	4	5	6	7	8
Ground	A	H	A	H	A	H	A	H
Result	L	W	L	W	L	L	L	L
Position	23	14	24	17	20	24	27	30
Points	0	3	3	6	6	6	6	6

Updated to match(es) played on 6 November 2025. Source: UEFA
A = Away; H = Home; W = Win; D = Draw; L = Loss; P = Postponed

== See also ==
- History of FC Basel
- List of FC Basel players
- List of FC Basel seasons

== Sources ==
- FCB squad 2025–26 at fcb-archiv.ch
- Switzerland 2025–26 at RSSSF
