= 2025–26 Swiss Cup =

Tournament details
- Country: Switzerland
- Date: 15 August 2025 – 24 May 2026
- Teams: 64

Final positions
- Champions: St. Gallen (2nd title)
- Runners-up: Lausanne Ouchy

The 2025–26 Swiss Cup is the 101st edition of the Swiss Cup, the premier annual association football cup for clubs in Switzerland.

== Overview ==
=== Participating teams ===
64 teams participate in the Swiss Cup. They come from across the three levels of the Swiss football pyramid:

- The 21 eligible members of the Swiss Football League are automatically entered
  - Twelve from the Super League
  - Nine teams from the Challenge League (Note: Liechtenstein club and Challenge League member FC Vaduz is not eligible to participate in the Swiss Cup. This spot is awarded to the Promotion League)
- 17 teams can qualify from the First League (Promotion League and 1. Liga) (Note: U21 squads of SFL teams are not eligible to participate in the Swiss Cup.)
  - Seven top ranked eligible teams of 2023–24 Swiss Promotion League
  - Ten 1. Liga Classic teams qualified through the qualifying tournament
- 25 teams can qualify from the Amateur League
  - Nine 2. Liga Interregional teams qualified through the qualifying tournament
  - 16 teams from the 13 regional football associations (regional associations of Bern-Jura, Zürich and Eastern Switzerland (Note: Includes the Cantons of St. Gallen, Thurgau, Appenzell Innerrhoden, Appenzell Ausserrhoden, Glarus, and Grisons.) have two participants)
- Final spot is awarded to the winner of the Suva Fairplay Trophy, awarded to the fairest football club of the last season

Super League; 12 teams	Challenge League; 9 teams	Promotion League; 7 teams	1. Liga; 11 teams	2. Liga Interregional; 10 teams	2. Liga; 12 teams	3. Liga/4. Liga; 3 teams
FC Basel; Grasshopper Club Zürich; FC Lausanne-Sport; FC Lugano; FC Luzern; Servette FC; FC Sion; FC St. Gallen; FC Thun; FC Winterthur; BSC Young Boys; FC Zürich	FC Aarau; AC Bellinzona; Étoile Carouge FC; Neuchâtel Xamax FCS; FC Rapperswil-Jona; FC Stade Lausanne-Ouchy; FC Stade Nyonnais; FC Wil 1900; Yverdon-Sport FC	FC Biel-Bienne; FC Breitenrain; SC Cham; FC Grand-Saconnex; SC Kriens; FC Schaffhausen; Vevey-Sports	FC Courtételle; FC Concordia Basel; FC Echallens; FC Mendrisio; FC Prishtina Bern; FC La Sarraz-Eclépens; SV Schaffhausen; FC Stade-Payerne; FC Wohlen; FC Wettswil-Bonstetten; Zug 94	FC Ajoie-Monterri; FC Altstätten; FC Bosna Neuchâtel; FC Dardania Lausanne; FC Gossau; FC Härkingen; FC Klingnau; FC Lachen/Altendorf; Signal FC Bernex-Confignon; FC Vernier	FC Azzurri Bienne; FC Breitenbach; FC Communal Sport Le Locle; FC Diaspora 2014; FC Lommiswil; FC Morbio; FC Perlen-Buchrain; FC Romanshorn; FC Saxon Sports; FC La Tour/Le Pâquier; FC Unterstrass; FC Veyrier Sports	FC Volketswil; FC Walenstadt; SC Nebikon (Note: SC Nebikon qualifies as the fairest team in Switzerland.)

=== Schedule ===
The following table shows the scheduling of the individual rounds of the competitions:

Round	Match date
Round 1 (round of 64)	15–17 August 2025
Round 2 (round of 32)	19–21 September 2025
Round 3 (round of 16)	2–4 December 2025
Round 4 (quarter-finals)	3–5 February 2026
Round 5 (semi-finals)	18–19 April 2026
Round 6 (final)	24 May 2026

=== Format ===
All rounds are drawn following the conclusion of the previous round. All participating teams enter the tournament in round 1. Matchup restrictions apply in the first two rounds:

- In Round 1, clubs of the Swiss Football League (SL and ChL) cannot be drawn against each other. Furthermore, matchups are regionally drawn.
- In Round 2, teams of the Swiss Super League cannot be drawn against each other.
- From Round 3 onward, no more matchup restrictions apply.

The competitor of the lower league (Note: League rankings: (SL): Swiss Super League (ChL): Swiss Challenge League (PL): Swiss Promotion League (1): 1. Liga (2I): 2. Liga Interregional (2): 2. Liga (3): 3. Liga) has home ground advantage in all rounds except the final, if applicable.

== Results ==
=== First round ===
The first round was drawn on 30 June 2025. Teams' league is indicated in brackets.

Team 1	Score	Team 2
FC Perlen-Buchrain (2) (Canton of Lucerne)	0–3	(Canton of Lucerne) FC Luzern (SL)
FC Volketswil (3) (Canton of Zurich)	0–8	(Canton of St. Gallen) FC Rapperswil-Jona (ChL)
FC Wettswil-Bonnstetten (1) (Canton of Zurich)	0–2	(Canton of Zurich) FC Zürich (SL)
FC Ajoie-Monterri (2I) (Canton of Jura)	0–2	(Valais) FC Sion (SL)
FC Walenstadt (3) (Canton of St. Gallen)	0–13	(Canton of St. Gallen) FC St. Gallen (SL)
FC Romanshorn (2) (Thurgau)	2–4	(Canton of St. Gallen) FC Altstätten (2I)
FC La Sarraz-Eclépens (1) (Vaud)	1–4	(Canton of Geneva) FC Grand-Saconnex (PL)
FC Lommiswil (2) (Canton of Solothurn)	1–4 (a.e.t.)	(Canton of Bern) FC Prishtina Bern (1)
FC Stade-Payerne (1) (Vaud)	1–3	(Vaud) Yverdon-Sport FC (ChL)
SC Kriens (PL) (Canton of Lucerne)	2–3 (a.e.t.)	(Canton of St. Gallen) FC Wil (ChL)
Zug 94 (1) (Canton of Zug)	0–0 (a.e.t.); 5–4 (p)	(Ticino) FC Mendrisio (1)
FC Veyrier Sports (2) (Canton of Geneva)	0–2	(Vaud) FC Stade Lausanne-Ouchy (ChL)
FC Härkingen (2I) (Canton of Solothurn)	2–3 (a.e.t.)	(Canton of Schaffhausen) FC Schaffhausen (PL)
FC Morbio (2) (Ticino)	2–1	(Canton of St. Gallen) FC Gossau (2I)
FC Le Communal Sport Le Locle (2) (Canton of Neuchâtel)	2–1	(Valais) FC Saxon Sports (2)
FC Vernier (2I) (Canton of Geneva)	0–1 (a.e.t.)	(Vaud) FC Echallens (1)
Signal FC Bernex-Confignon (2I) (Canton of Geneva)	0–3 (a.e.t.)	(Canton of Geneva) Étoile Carouge FC (ChL)
SV Schaffhausen (1) (Canton of Schaffhausen)	0–5	(Canton of Zurich) FC Winterthur (SL)
FC Diaspora (2) (Canton of Jura)	2–3	(Canton of Neuchâtel) Neuchâtel Xamax FCS (ChL)
FC Breitenbach (2) (Canton of Solothurn)	0–5	(Canton of Neuchâtel) FC Bosna Neuchâtel (2I)
FC Unterstrass (2) (Canton of Zurich)	4–4 (a.e.t.); 4–2 (p)	(Aargau) FC Klingnau (2I)
SC Nebikon (4) (Canton of Lucerne)	0–4	(Ticino) AC Bellinzona (ChL)
FC Wohlen (1) (Aargau)	1–3	(Aargau) FC Aarau (ChL)
FC Biel-Bienne (PL) (Canton of Bern)	1–6	(Basel-Stadt) FC Basel (SL)
FC Azzurri Bienne (2) (Canton of Bern)	0–8	(Basel-Stadt) FC Concordia Basel (1)
SC Cham (PL) (Canton of Zug)	3–2	(Ticino) FC Lugano (SL)
FC La Tour/Le Pâquier (2) (Canton of Fribourg)	0–4	(Vaud) FC Stade Nyonnais (ChL)
FC Dardania Lausanne (2I) (Vaud)	0–5	(Canton of Geneva) Servette FC (SL)
Vevey-Sports (PL) (Vaud)	1–2	(Vaud) FC Lausanne-Sport (SL)
FC Courtételle (1) (Canton of Jura)	1–4	(Canton of Bern) BSC Young Boys (SL)
FC Breitenrain (PL) (Canton of Bern)	1–0	(Canton of Bern) FC Thun (SL)
FC Lachen/Altendorf (2I) (Canton of Schwyz)	0–2	(Canton of Zurich) Grasshopper Club Zürich (SL)

Last updated: 17 August 2025
Source: Resultate

=== Second round ===
The second round was drawn following the conclusion of the first round on 17 August 2025.

19 September 2025	Étoile Carouge (2)	2–2 (a.e.t.) (2–3 p)	Basel (1)	Carouge
19:00 CET	Essiena 40' (red card) 76'; Sene 118'		Agbonifo 90+3'; Zé 97'	Stadium: Stade de la Fontenette
	Penalties
	Bua (penalty scored); Hysenaj (penalty scored); Maouche (penalty missed); Traoré (penalty missed); Sene (penalty missed)		Shaqiri (penalty scored); Metinho (penalty scored); Broschinski (penalty scored); Agbonifo (penalty missed)

20 September 2025	Zug 94 (4)	1–0	Breitenrain (3)	Zug
16:00 CET	Campello 76'			Stadium: Stadion Herti Allmend

20 September 2025	Le Locle (6)	3–4	Grand-Saconnex (3)	Le Locle
17:00 CET	Kola 5'; Jaouzi 38'; Fofana 63'		Regillo 12'; Abbas 20'; Matuvunu 31'; Semedo 90+13'	Stadium: Terrain du Communal

20 September 2025	Echallens (4)	0–1	Lausanne Ouchy (2)	Échallens
17:00 CET			Caddy 36'	Stadium: Stade des 3 Sapins

20 September 2025	Unterstrass (6)	0–5	Neuchâtel Xamax (2)	Zurich
17:00 CET			Salz 13'; Epitaux 26'; Demhasaj 60', 84'; Carraco 62'	Stadium: Sportplatz Steinkluppe

20 September 2025	Morbio (6)	0–4	Rapperswil-Jona (2)	Mendrisio
18:00 CET			Schmidt 24', 37'; Dabanlı 62'; De Carvalho 90'	Stadium: Stadio Comunale

20 September 2025	Aarau (2)	1–0	Young Boys (1)	Aarau
19:00 CET	Filet 2'			Stadium: Stadion Brügglifeld

20 September 2025	Prishtina Bern (4)	0–2	Sion (1)	Bern
19:00 CET			Lukembila 8'; Chipperfield 88'	Stadium: Sportplatz Bodenweid

20 September 2025	Wil (2)	1–1 (a.e.t.) (1–3 p)	St. Gallen (1)	Wil
19:00 CET	Selmonaj 102'		Vladi 91'	Stadium: Lidl Arena
	Penalties
	Jacovic (penalty missed); Diarra (penalty missed); Abazi (penalty scored); Bytyqi (penalty missed)		Boukhalfa (penalty scored); Vallçi (penalty scored); Stevanović (penalty missed); Neziri (penalty scored)

20 September 2025	Yverdon-Sport (2)	1–0	Servette (1)	Yverdon-les-Bains
20:30 CET	Sessolo 59'			Stadium: Stade Municipal

21 September 2025	Altstätten (5)	0–3	Cham (3)	Altstätten
13:30 CET			Loosli 24'; Tia (red card) 33'; Ris 67', 89'	Stadium: Sportanlage Gesa

21 September 2025	Concordia Basel (4)	1–4	Lausanne-Sport (1)	Basel
14:00 CET	Caillet 15'		Ajdini 16', 58'; Lekweiry 33'; Bair 61'	Stadium: Leichtathletik-Stadion St. Jakob

21 September 2025	Stade Nyonnais (2)	1–1 (a.e.t.) (3–1 p)	Zürich (1)	Nyon
15:30 CET	Simo 67'		Phaëton 20'	Stadium: Centre Sportif de Colovray
	Penalties
	Correia (penalty missed); Polster (penalty scored); Simo (penalty scored); Bega (penalty scored)		Zuber (penalty missed); Reverson (penalty missed); Tsawa (penalty missed); Comenencia (penalty scored)

21 September 2025	Bosna Neuchâtel (5)	0–6	Luzern (1)	Neuchâtel
16:00 CET	Efendic (red card) 83'		Grbić 4', 6'; Villiger 16'; Ferreira 20'; Dantas 62'; Kabwit 67'	Stadium: Stade de la Maladière

21 September 2025	Schaffhausen (3)	0–4	Winterthur (1)	Schaffhausen
16:00 CET	Harperink 80' (o.g.)		Chiappetta 47'; Buess 62'; Sidler 75'	Stadium: FCS Arena

21 September 2025	Bellinzona (2)	0–1	Grasshopper Club (1)	Bellinzona
17:00 CET			Meyer 7'	Stadium: Stadio Comunale

=== Third round ===
The third round was drawn following the conclusion of the Second round on 21 September 2025.

2 December 2025	Lausanne Ouchy (2)	1–0	Winterthur (1)	Lausanne
19:00 CET	Caddy 60'			Stadium: Stade de la Pontaise

2 December 2025	Stade Nyonnais (2)	1–1 (a.e.t.) (2–4 p)	Neuchâtel Xamax (2)	Nyon
19:30 CET	Bega 88'		Deme 83'	Stadium: Centre Sportif de Colovray
	Penalties
	Diomandé (penalty missed); Polster (penalty scored); Simo (penalty scored); Sarr (penalty missed)		Ben Seghir (penalty scored); Bergsma (penalty missed); Bayard (penalty scored); Deme (penalty scored); Demhasaj (penalty scored)

2 December 2025	Cham (3)	1–2	Grasshopper Club (1)	Cham
20:00 CET	Ris 90+2' (pen.)		Ullmann 18'; Abels 21'	Stadium: Stadion Eizmoos

3 December 2025	Zug 94 (4)	1–4	Luzern (1)	Zug
20:00 CET	Teichmann 82'		Villiger 37'; Grbić 52'; Ferreira 55'; Wyss 90'	Stadium: Stadion Herti Allmend

3 December 2025	Rapperswil-Jona (2)	1–1 (a.e.t.) (1–2 p)	St. Gallen (1)	Jona
20:15 CET			Boukhalfa 100'; Vallçi 105' (o.g.)	Stadium: Stadion Grünfeld
	Penalties
	Kamberi (penalty missed); Marchand (penalty missed); Dabanlı (penalty scored); Volkart (penalty missed); Emini (penalty missed)		Neziri (penalty missed); Vallçi (penalty scored); Quintillà (penalty scored); Boukhalfa (penalty missed)

3 December 2025	Yverdon-Sport (2)	2–1 (a.e.t.)	Lausanne-Sport (1)	Yverdon-les-Bains
20:30 CET	Sorgić 72'; Golliard 114'		Bair 25'	Stadium: Stade Municipal

4 December 2025	Grand-Saconnex (3)	1–3	Basel (1)	Basel
18:30 CET	Matuvunu 9'		Traoré 6', 68'; Otele 58'	Stadium: St. Jakob-Park (Note: Due to insufficient infrastructure at FC Grand-Saconnex's home ground, FC Basel will host the match.)

4 December 2025	Aarau (2)	1–3	Sion (1)	Aarau
20:30 CET			Chouaref 14'; Hajziri 61' (o.g.); Boteli 82', 90+7'	Stadium: Stadion Brügglifeld

=== Fourth round ===
The fourth round was drawn following the conclusion of the third round on 4 December 2025.

3 February 2026	Neuchâtel Xamax (2)	1–2	Yverdon-Sport (2)	Neuchâtel
19:30 CET	Demhasaj 12'		Pasche 26'; Tasar 79'	Stadium: Stade de la Maladière

3 February 2026	Grasshopper Club (1)	4–3 (a.e.t.)	Sion (1)	Zurich
20:30 CET	Asp 76'; Tsimba 79', 94'; Frey 90+3'		Hajrizi 6' (yellow card) 118' (yellow-red card) 120'; Kololli 72'; Lukembila 85'	Stadium: Stadion Letzigrund

4 February 2026	Lausanne Ouchy (2)	2–1	Luzern (1)	Lausanne
19:15 CET	Barbet 4'; Bah 17'		Ferreira 87'	Stadium: Stade de la Pontaise

4 February 2026	St. Gallen (1)	2–1	Basel (1)	St. Gallen
20:15 CET	Baldé 1'; Boukhalfa 90+3'		Koloto 65'	Stadium: Kybunpark

=== Semi-final ===
The semi-finals were drawn following the conclusion of the fourth round on 4 February 2026.

18 April 2026
19:15 CEST

Lausanne Ouchy (2)	2–0	Grasshopper Club (1)
Nomel 51'; Tritten 90'	Report

Stade Olympique de la Pontaise, Lausanne
Attendance: 6,200
Referee: Sandro Schärer
19 April 2026
15:00 CEST

Yverdon-Sport (2)	0–2	St. Gallen (1)
	Report	Görtler 7'; Vogt 88'

Stade Municipal, Yverdon-les-Bains
Attendance: 5,104
Referee: Fedayi San

=== Final ===
24 May 2026
14:00 CEST

Lausanne Ouchy (2)	0–3	St. Gallen (1)
	Report	Gaal 9'; Görtler 65' (pen.); Witzig 90+2'

Stadion Wankdorf, Bern
Referee: Luca Cibelli
