= 2025–26 FC Zürich season =

FC Zürich
2025–26 season
- Head coach: Mitchell van der Gaag (until 23 October); Dennis Hediger (from 1 January)
- Stadium: Letzigrund
- Swiss Super League: 8th
- Swiss Cup: Second round
- Average home league attendance: 13,527

The 2025–26 season is the 130th season in the history of FC Zürich, and the club's ninth-consecutive season in Swiss Super League. In addition to the domestic league, the team also participated in the Swiss Cup. They were eliminated in the second round.

It was Mitchell van der Gaag's first season as manager. He replaced Ricardo Moniz, who was sacked shortly after the end of the previous season. Van der Gaag was sacked on 23 October, with Zürich in eighth position in the Swiss Super League. Dennis Hediger took over in the interim, and was named the permanent head coach on 1 January.

== Pre-season ==
New signings included defensive midfielder Nelson Palacio, on loan from Real Salt Lake, and Guadaloupe forward Matthias Phaëton, on loan from CSKA Sofia. Outbound went Ifeanyi Mathew and Rodrigo Conceicao (released), Nikola Katić (to Schalke), Labinot Bajrami (to Helmond), Ramon Guzzo (to Aarau), Fabian Gloor (to Schaffhausen), Daniel Afriyie (to Aarau), Joseph Sabobo (to Hapoel Be'er Sheva) and Daniel Denoon (on loan to Pisa).

=== Results ===
On 30 May 2025, Zürich announced a pre-season friendly against SSV Ulm 1846 at the German club's Donaustadion. It was Zürich's final friendly prior to their first Super League fixture a week later. On 4 June 2025, Zürich announced four friendlies preceding that with UIm: against Dietikon, Young Fellows Juventus, Rapperswil-Jona and Wil. Another friendly, away to Magdeburg on 10 July, was also added.

21 June 2025 Friendly (45 minutes)	Zürich	2–0	Dietikon	Dietikon
11:00 CEST		Report		Stadium: Sportanlange Dornau

21 June 2025 Friendly (45 minutes)	Zürich	4–1	Young Fellows Juventus	Dietikon
12:00 CEST		Report		Stadium: Sportanlange Dornau

28 June 2025 Friendly	Rapperswil-Jona	0–2	Zurich	Rapperswil-Jona
16:00 CEST		Report		Stadium: Grünfeld Stadium

5 July 2025 Friendly	Wil	1–3	Zurich	Wil
11:00 CEST		Report		Stadium: Sportpark Bergholz

10 July 2025 Friendly	Magdeburg	0–2	Zurich	Mindelheim
14:00 CEST		Report		Stadium: Julius-Strohmayer Stadion

20 July 2025 Friendly	Ulm	3–0	Zürich	Ulm
15:30 CEST		Report		Stadium: Donaustadion

== Season proper ==
=== July ===
On 25 July, Zürich began the season by hosting Sion at the Letzigrund in Mitchell van der Gaag's first competitive game in charge of Zürich. Despite going 2–0 ahead, the visitors fought back to win 3–2. Steven Zuber and Damienus Reverson scored Zürich's goals. Zürich sat in ninth place in the table after the first round of matches.

The following day, Colombian forward Juan Jose Perea and Serbian left-back Milan Rodić joined the club. French forward Lisandru Tramoni followed on 27 July.

=== August ===
On 2 August, Colombian defender Jorge Segura joined on a three-year contract. The following day, Zürich drew 1–1 at Luzern, with Umeh Emmanuel equalising for the visitors. Zürich climbed to eighth place in the Super League table.

Dutch defender Livano Comenencia and Senegalese forward Philippe Keny joined the club in early August.

On 10 August, Zürich won 2–1 at Lausanne and climbed one place to seventh. Bledian Krasniqi and Jorge Segura scored the visitors' goals.

Five days later, Zürich reached the second round of the Swiss Cup after a 2–0 victory at Wettswil-Bonstetten. Umeh Emmanuel scored both goals, bringing his tally for the season to three in four games.

Zürich returned to league action on 23 August, losing 4–0 at home to newly promoted Thun. The hosts were placed seventh in the table after the match.

A victory, 3–1 at nearby Winterthur on 30 August, kept Zürich in seventh place. Loanee Matthias Phaëton scored twice for the visitors, with Steven Zuber scoring the other goal.

Zürich beat Servette 2–1 at the Letzigrund on 13 September, with both of the hosts' goals coming from Cheveyo Tsawa. Zürich finished the game with nine men, after the dismissals of Mohamed Bangoura and Ilan Sauter. They climbed to fourth with the three points.

=== September ===
Stade Nyonnais knocked Zürich out of the Swiss Cup at the second-round stage on 21 September. The match at the Colovray Sports Centre finished 1–1, with Matthias Phaëton scoring for the visitors, but Stade Nyonnais won 3–1 on penalties.

A third-consecutive victory in the Swiss Super League followed on 27 September, 3–1 at home to St Gallen. Steven Zuber, Philippe Keny (his first for the club) and Jahnoah Markelo scored Zürich's goals. They remained fourth in the table.

=== October ===
The Zurich derby, on 4 October, ended with a 3–0 victory for Grasshoppers. Zürich dropped one place to fifth in the table.

After a two-week international break, on 18 October, Zürich lost 1–0 at Lugano. The visitors slipped to eighth in the Super League.

Manager Mitchell van der Gaag was sacked on 23 October, after club president Ancillo Canepa stated that he felt the team had "become stagnant".

On 26 October, Zürich lost 3–2 at home to Young Boys.

A loss followed on 29 October, 2–0 at Basel, leaving the club ninth in the Super League.

=== November ===
On 1 November, Zürich lost a fifth league game in a row, and their sixth in seven in all competitions, this time 2–1 at home to Lausanne. They dropped one place to tenth, fifteen points behind leaders Thun.

Zürich came from two goals down to beat Luzern 3–2 at the Letzigrund on 8 November. The visitors were reduced to ten men in the second half. Zürich's goals, all in the second half, came from Jahnoah Markelo (penalty), Matthias Phaëton and Philippe Keny (penalty).

On 23 November, Zürich drew 2–2 at Sion. Steven Zuber and Philippe Keny got the visitors' goals.

Zürich beat Grasshopper 1–0 on 29 November. The goal came from Lindrit Kamberi after 20 minutes.

=== December ===
A third win in four matches came at St Gallen on 6 December. Matthias Phaeton and Philippe Keny scored Zürich's goals in a 2–1 victory.

On 13 December, Zürich drew 2–2 at home to Winterthur. Damienus Reverson and Philippe Keny scored the hosts' goals. Winterthur equalised in the 90th minute.

Four days later, Zürich lost at home by a single goal to Lugano.

On 19 December, it was announced that Dennis Hediger will be installed as the club's permanent head coach on 1 January, having taken over in an interim capacity three months earlier. The following day, Zürich lost 4–2 at Thun, having been two goals up. The visitors sat seventh in the table, with 24 points from a possible 57.

=== January ===
On 1 January, midfielder Steven Zuber had his contract with the club terminated early. The same month, the club terminated the contract of left-back Milan Rodić, replacing him with Chris Kablan. Centre-back Mariano Gómez moved to Ferencvárosi TC, while left-back Nemanja Tošić signed for Anorthosis.

Returning from the winter break, Zürich travelled to Geneva, where they drew 1–1 with Servette, despite having defender Lindrit Kamberi sent off in the second half. They placed eighth in the table with the point.

Zürich lost 4–3 at home to Basel on 25 January. The hosts' goals came from Matthias Phaëton, Philippe Keny (penalty) and Damienus Reverson. They remained eighth in the table. Despite their victory, Basel sacked their head coach, former Zürich left-back Ludovic Magnin, the following day.

On 27 January, winger Jahnoah Markelo joined Coventry City for an undisclosed fee. Two days later, defender Calixte Ligue joined Venezia.

=== February ===
Zürich lost 3–0 at Young Boys on 1 February. The visitors dropped one place to ninth.

On 3 February, forward Lisandru Tramoni had has contract with the club terminated. Two days later, the club announced the signing of 32-year-old defender Alexander Hack.

Zürich lost their fifth league game out of six on 8 February, a 2–1 scoreline at Basel, despite taking the lead. They remained ninth in the table, with 25 points from 23 games.

On 11 February, Zürich secured their first victory in over two months with a 3–0 scoreline against bottom club Winterthur. Philippe Keny (two) and Nevio Di Giusto got the goals for Zürich, who climbed to eighth with the three points. In the days before the match, Zürich signed Kosovan midfielder Valon Berisha and sold forward Vincent Nvendo.

== Competitions ==
=== Swiss Super League ===
==== Matches ====
Win Draw Loss Fixtures

25 July 2025 Round 1	Zürich	2–3	Sion	Zurich
	Zuber 27'; Reverson 55'	Report	Nivokazi 81'; Lukembila 87'; Boteli 90+1'	Stadium: Letzigrund; Attendance: 12,374; Referee: S. Wolfensberger (Switzerland)

3 August 2025 Round 2	Luzern	1–1	Zürich	Lucerne
		Report		Stadium: Swissporarena

10 August 2025 Round 3	Lausanne	1–2	Zürich	Lausanne
		Report		Stadium: Stade de la Tuiliere; Attendance: 12,544

23 August 2025 Round 4	Zürich	0–4	Thun	Zurich
		Report		Stadium: Letzigrund; Attendance: 13,581

30 August 2025 Round 5	Winterthur	1–3	Zürich	Winterthur
		Report		Stadium: Stadion Schützenwiese; Attendance: 8,700

13 September 2025 Round 6	Zürich	2–1	Servette	Zurich
		Report		Stadium: Letzigrund

27 September 2025 Round 7	Zürich	3–1	St Gallen	Zurich
		Report		Stadium: Letzigrund; Attendance: 13,949

4 October 2025 Round 8	Grasshopper	3–0	Zürich	Zurich
	Asp Jensen 35' (Marques); Marques 55' (Asp Jensen); Muci 82' (pen.)	Report		Stadium: Letzigrund; Attendance: 17,329; Referee: Lionel Tschudi; Assistant referees: Nico Gianforte (VAR)

18 October 2025 Round 9	Lugano	1–0	Zürich	Lugano
		Report		Stadium: Stadio di Cornaredo; Attendance: 4,450

26 October 2025 Round 10	Zürich	2–3	Young Boys	Zurich
		Report		Stadium: Letzigrund; Attendance: 15,596

29 October 2025 11	Basel	2–0	Zürich	St. Jakob-Park, Basel
20:30	Traoré 13' (1:0); Vouilloz (yellow card) 42'; Salah 50' (2:0); Salah (yellow card) 76'	FCZ summary FCB summary	(yellow card) 12' Ligue; (yellow card) 39' Comenencia	Attendance: 27,073; Referee: (Switzerland) Lukas Fähndrich

1 November 2025 Round 12	Zürich	1–2	Lausanne	Zurich
		Report		Stadium: Letzigrund; Attendance: 9,613

8 November 2025 Round 13	Zürich	3–2	Luzern	Zurich
		Report		Stadium: Letzigrund; Attendance: 13,762

23 November 2025 Round 14	Sion	2–2	Zürich	Sion
				Stadium: Stade de Tourbillon

29 November 2025 Round 15	Zürich	1–0	Grasshopper	Zurich
				Stadium: Letzigrund

6 December 2025 Round 16	St Gallen	1–2	Zürich	St Gallen
				Stadium: Kybunpark

13 December 2025 Round 17	Zürich	2–2	Winterthur	Zurich
				Stadium: Letzigrund

17 December 2025 Round 18	Zürich	0–1	Lugano	Zurich
				Stadium: Letzigrund

20 December 2025 Round 19	Thun	4–2	Zürich	Thun
				Stadium: Stockhorn Arena

18 January 2026 Round 20	Servette	1–1	Zürich	Geneva
		Report		Stadium: Stade de Genève

25 January 2026 Round 21	Zürich	3–4	Basel	Letzigrund, Zürich
16:30	Phaëton 1' (1:0); Phaëton (yellow card) 2'; Kény 43' (2:1); Reverson 64' (3:3); Kény (yellow card) 70'; Di Giusto (yellow card) 74'	FCZ summary FCB summary	11' (1_1) Shaqiri; (yellow card) 42' Ajeti; (yellow card) 44' Shaqiri; 45+3' (2:2) Shaqiri; 51' (2:3) Otele; (yellow card) 80' Koindredi; 90+4' (3:4) Shaqiri	Attendance: 18,878; Referee: (Switzerland) Fedayi San (Gebenstorf)

1 February 2026 Round 22	Young Boys	3–0	Zürich	Bern
		Report

==== Third round ====
The fixtures and dates for the third round were announced on 20 December 2025.

8 February 2026 Round 23	Basel	2–1	Zürich	St. Jakob-Park, Basel
16:30	Leroy (yellow card) 36'; Shaqiri 90' (pen.); Salah 90+6' (2:1)	FCB summary	(yellow card) 5' Sauter; 16' (0:1) Sauter; (yellow card) 85' Reverson; (yellow card) 88' Comenencia; (yellow card) 89' Nvendo; (yellow card) 89' Palacio	Attendance: 28,790; Referee: (Switzerland) Urs Schnyder

11 February 2026 Round 24	Zürich	3–0	Winterthur	Zurich
		Report		Stadium: Letzigrund

==== League table at split ====
Pos	Team	Pld	W	D	L	GF	GA	GD	Pts	Qualification or relegation (Note: Teams play each other three times (33 matches), before the league is split into two groups (the top six and the bottom six).)
1	Thun	33	24	2	7	75	37	+38	74	To championship group
2	St. Gallen	33	17	9	7	64	40	+24	60	To championship group
3	Lugano	33	16	9	8	50	38	+12	57	To championship group
4	Basel	33	15	8	10	51	45	+6	53	To championship group
5	Sion	33	13	13	7	51	35	+16	52	To championship group
6	Young Boys	33	13	9	11	65	60	+5	48	To championship group
7	Luzern	33	10	10	13	64	61	+3	40	To relegation group
8	Servette	33	9	13	11	57	57	0	40	To relegation group
9	Lausanne-Sport	33	10	9	14	47	57	−10	39	To relegation group
10	Zürich	33	10	4	19	45	63	−18	34	To relegation group
11	Grasshopper	33	6	9	18	40	65	−25	27	To relegation group
12	Winterthur	33	4	7	22	35	86	−51	19	To relegation group

Updated to match(es) played on 18 April 2026. Source: Brack Super League - Tabelle
Rules for classification: 1) Points; 2) Goal difference; 3) Goals scored; 4) Head-to-head goal difference; 5) Head-to-head goals scored 6) Away goals scored; 7) Draw.

==== Relegation group ====
2026 Round 34	Lausanne-Sport	3–0	Zürich	Stade de la Tuilière, Lausanne
	Goal	FCZ summary		Referee: (Switzerland)

2026 Round 35	Winterthur	2–2	Zürich	Schützenwiese, Winterthur
	Goal	FCZ summary	Goal	Referee: (Switzerland)

2026 Round 36	Zürich	2–1	Grasshopper Club	Letzigrund, Zürich
	Goal	FCZ summary	Goal	Referee: (Switzerland)

2026 Round 37	Luzern	1–0	Zürich
	Goal	FCZ summary		Referee: (Switzerland)

2026 Round 38	Zürich	0–2	Servette	Letzigrund, Zürich
		FCZ summary	Goal	Referee: (Switzerland)

==== Final league table ====
Pos	Team	Pld	W	D	L	GF	GA	GD	Pts	Qualification or relegation (Note: Teams play each other three times (33 matches), before the league is split into two groups (the top six and the bottom six).)
1	Thun (C)	38	24	3	11	80	52	+28	75	Qualification for the Champions League second qualifying round
2	St. Gallen	38	20	10	8	72	47	+25	70	Qualification for the Europa League second qualifying round (Note: St. Gallen won the 2025–26 Swiss Cup and qualified for the Europa League second qualifying round as cup winners. Since they finished in the top three, the second Conference League berth was passed to the fourth-placed team, Sion.)
3	Lugano	38	19	10	9	59	42	+17	67	Qualification for the Conference League second qualifying round
4	Sion	38	16	15	7	63	40	+23	63	Qualification for the Conference League second qualifying round
5	Basel	38	16	8	14	55	58	−3	56	
6	Young Boys	38	15	10	13	80	69	+11	55	
7	Luzern	38	14	11	13	76	66	+10	53	
8	Servette	38	13	14	11	71	63	+8	53	
9	Lausanne-Sport	38	11	9	18	53	67	−14	42	
10	Zürich	38	11	5	22	49	72	−23	38	
11	Grasshopper (O)	38	8	9	21	48	74	−26	33	Qualification for the Relegation play-off
12	Winterthur (R)	38	5	8	25	44	100	−56	23	Relegation to 2026–27 Swiss Challenge League

Source: Brack Super League - Tabelle
Rules for classification: 1) Points; 2) Goal difference; 3) Goals scored; 4) Head-to-head goal difference; 5) Head-to-head goals scored 6) Away goals scored; 7) Draw.
(C) Champions; (O) Play-off winners; (R) Relegated

=== Swiss Cup ===
==== Matches ====
Win Draw Loss Fixtures

15 August 2025 First round	Wettswil-Bonstetten	0–2	Zürich	Bonstetten
14:00		Report

21 September 2025 Second round	Stade Nyonnais	1–1 (3–1 p)	Zürich	Nyon
		Report		Stadium: Colovray Sports Centre
