= 2024–25 Promotion League =

Promotion League
- Season: 2024–25
- Dates: 3 August 2024 – 24 May 2025
- Champions: Rapperswil-Jona
- Promoted: Rapperswil-Jona
- Relegated: Baden; Delémont
- Swiss Cup: Biel-Bienne; Breitenrain; Cham; Grand-Saconnex; Kriens; Rapperswil-Jona
- Matches: 306
- Top goalscorer: Robin Golliard (26 Goals)

The 2024–25 Promotion League season (known as the Hoval Promotion League for sponsorship reasons) is the 13th edition (11th under its current name) of the 3rd tier of the Swiss football league system under its current format.

== Overview ==
Vevey-Sports and Grand-Saconnex were promoted from the lower division, replacing FC St. Gallen II and Servette FC II. FC Baden were relegated from the 2023–24 Swiss Challenge League, replacing promoted Etoile Carouge FC.

Location of the 2024–25 Promotion League teams

=== Teams ===
Club	Canton	Stadium	Capacity
Baden	Aargau	Esp Stadium	7,000
Basel U21	Basel-City	Stadion Rankhof or Youth Campus Basel	7,000; 1,000
Bavois	Vaud	Terrain des Peupliers	659
Biel-Bienne	Bern	Tissot Arena	5,200
Breitenrain	Bern	Spitalacker	1,450
Brühl	St. Gallen	Paul-Grüninger-Stadion	4,200
Bulle	Fribourg	Stade de Bouleyres	7,000
Cham	Zug	Stadion Eizmoos	1,800
Delémont	Jura	La Blancherie	5,263
Grand-Saconnex	Geneva	Stade du Blanché	1,000
Kriens	Lucerne	Stadion Kleinfeld	5,360
Lugano U21	Ticino	Cornaredo Stadium	6,330
Luzern U21	Lucerne	Swissporarena or Allmend Süd	16,800; 2,000
Paradiso	Ticino	Campo Pian Scairolo	1,000
Rapperswil-Jona	St. Gallen	Stadion Grünfeld	2,500
Vevey-Sports	Vaud	Stade de Copet	4,000
Young Boys U21	Bern	Stadion Wankdorf	32,000
Zürich U21	Zürich	Sportplatz Heerenschürli	1,120

== League table ==
Pos	Team	Pld	W	D	L	GF	GA	GD	Pts	Promotion, qualification or relegation
1	Rapperswil-Jona (C, P)	34	21	6	7	72	35	+37	69	Promotion to Swiss Challenge League and qualification for Swiss Cup
2	Kriens (Q)	34	20	8	6	72	45	+27	68	Qualification for Swiss Cup
3	Biel-Bienne (Q)	34	20	5	9	65	44	+21	65	Qualification for Swiss Cup
4	Basel U21	34	15	11	8	59	47	+12	56	
5	Breitenrain (Q)	34	15	8	11	61	64	−3	53	Qualification for Swiss Cup
6	Cham (Q)	34	11	11	12	48	51	−3	44	Qualification for Swiss Cup
7	Grand-Saconnex (Q)	34	9	15	10	67	60	+7	42	Qualification for Swiss Cup
8	Vevey-Sports	34	11	12	11	60	70	−10	42 (Note: Vevey-Sports were deducted 3 points.)	
9	Paradiso	34	11	9	14	31	41	−10	42	
10	Bulle	34	10	11	13	44	49	−5	41	
11	Bavois	34	10	10	14	41	46	−5	40	
12	Young Boys U21	34	11	7	16	40	47	−7	40	
13	Bruhl	34	11	7	16	54	72	−18	40	
14	Luzern U21	34	9	12	13	62	65	−3	39	
15	Lugano U21	34	10	9	15	46	51	−5	39	
16	Zürich U21	34	11	6	17	51	59	−8	39	
17	Baden (R)	34	11	6	17	34	52	−18	39	Relegation to the 1. Liga Classic
18	Delémont (R)	34	10	7	17	43	52	−9	37	Relegation to the 1. Liga Classic

Source: Erste Liga - Match center
Rules for classification: 1) Points; 2) Goal difference; 3) Goals scored; 4) Head-to-head goal difference; 5) Away goals scored; 6) Draw.
(C) Champions; (P) Promoted; (Q) Qualified for the phase indicated; (R) Relegated

== Results ==
Home \ Away	BAD	BAS	BAV	BIE	BRE	BRÜ	BUL	CHA	DEL	GRA	KRI	LUG	LUZ	PAR	RAP	VEV	YOU	ZÜR
Baden	—	1–2		1–2						1–2	1–1	1–0			1–2	2–5	2–0	
Basel U21		—						1–0					1–0					0–0
Bavois		3–0	—				2–1		1–1	1–1		3–4			0–1			
Biel-Bienne		1–1		—	2–1		0–1		1–0		4–0	2–0				5–1	2–1	3–3
Breitenrain					—	1–0	3–2		2–0		3–4	1–0	3–1				0–0	3–1
Brühl	3–0			2–3		—					1–3			2–0	1–0	1–4	1–2	
Bulle		2–2		1–0		2–3	—	0–0					3–2					1–0
Cham	2–0		1–0					—			3–3			0–0		5–3	0–0	
Delémont		1–2						0–1	—				2–3			1–1		1–2
Grand-Saconnex		1–1	5–1		2–2		2–4	1–1	3–2	—	0–2	1–1						
Kriens		0–0	2–2					2–2	1–1		—			3–1			3–0	
Lugano U21	1–3					1–2	0–0	3–1			0–3	—	1–1					
Luzern U21	1–2	2–2	0–3			1–1				1–1			—	0–1		3–3	3–1	
Paradiso		1–3	1–0	0–1			0–2		1–2	0–6				—	1–2			
Rapperswil-Jona		5–2		1–0	0–0		5–0	1–2	3–0			2–3		0–0	—			
Vevey-Sports		0–5	4–1	1–1	2–1					2–2				0–0	3–2	—		
Young Boys U21			1–2	4–5	4–3					1–1		3–0			1–3		—	
Zürich U21	1–0		3–2			6–0	1–1		1–1		0–3	3–0		0–2		1–2	0–1	—

Updated to match(es) played on 2 March 2025. Source: Erste Liga - Match center
Legend: Blue = home team win; Yellow = draw; Red = away team win.
