= Dennis Hediger =

Swiss footballer (born 1986)

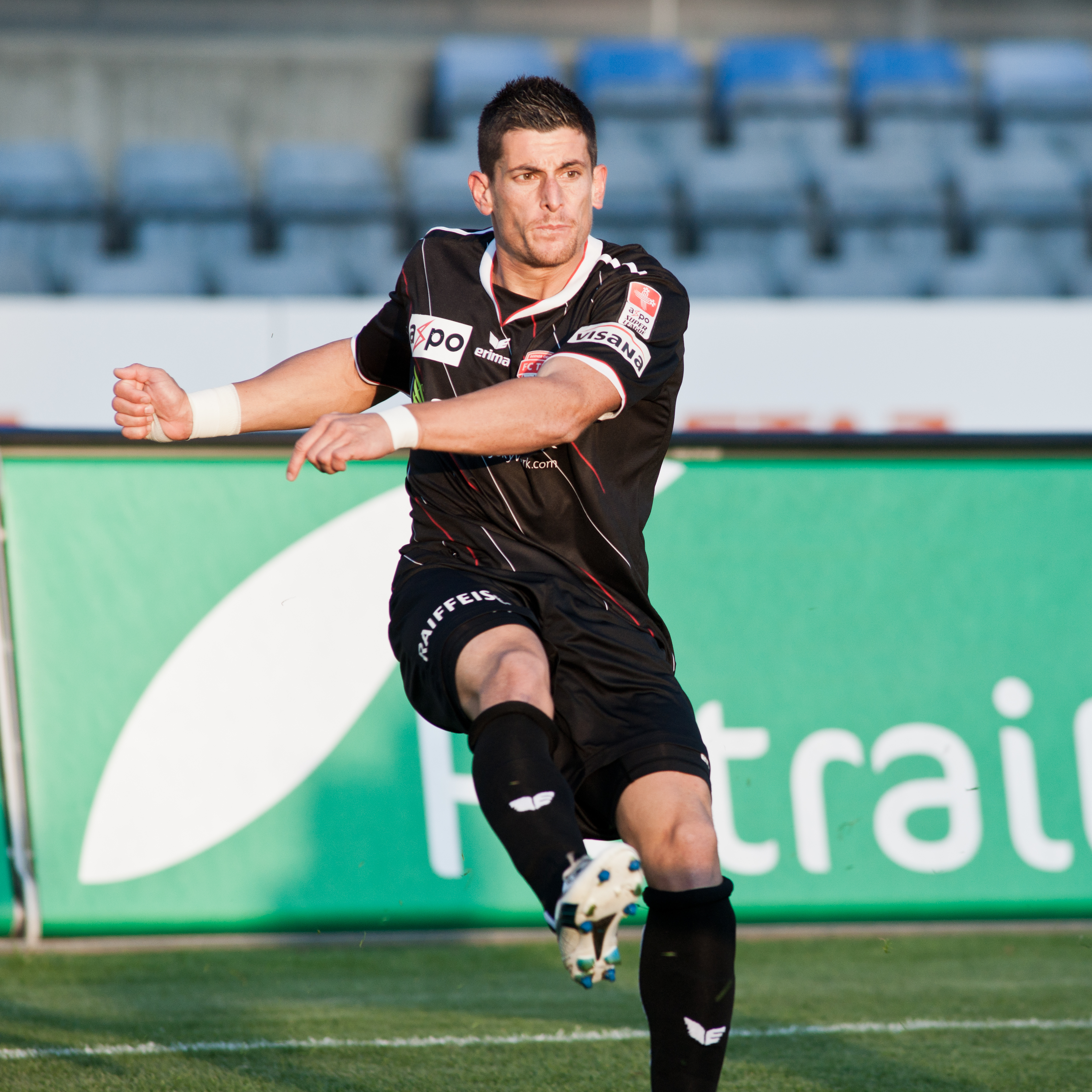
- Hediger in 2011

Personal information
- Date of birth: 22 September 1986 (age 40)
- Place of birth: Bern, Switzerland
- Height: 1.75 m (5 ft 9 in)
- Position: Midfielder

Team information
- Current team: Zürich (head coach)

Youth career
- Young Boys

Senior career*
| Years | Team | Apps | (Gls) |
| 2006–2010 | Biel-Bienne | 94 | (3) |
| 2010–2020 | Thun | 241 | (13) |
| Total | | 335 | (16) |

Managerial career
- 2020–2021: Thun (U15 manager)
- 2021–2022: Basel (U16 manager)
- 2022–2023: Basel (U18 manager)
- 2023–2024: Basel (U21 manager)
- 2024–2025: Zürich (U19 and U21 manager)
- 2025: Zürich (interim head coach)
- 2026: Zürich
- * Club domestic league appearances and goals

Dennis Hediger (born 22 September 1986) is a Swiss former professional footballer who played as a midfielder. He retired at the end of his contract on 1 July 2020. He was most recently the head coach of FC Zürich.

== Career ==
=== Coaching and management career ===
After retiring, Hediger remained at FC Thun in a new role of head coach of the club's U-15 team. In the 2021–22 season, he coached FC Basel's U16s, in the upcoming 2022–23 season the U18s, and ahead of the 2023–24 season, he was named manager of the club's U21s.

In January 2024, he joined FC Zürich as U16s manager, initially, then manager of the club's U19 and U21 teams. He became the first-team assistant to head coach Mitchell van der Gaag upon the Dutchman's appointment prior to the 2025–26 season. After van der Gaag's dismissal, in October 2025, Hediger took over as interim head coach. He was given the role permanently on 19 December.

In October 2025, he became the interim head coach of FC Zürich after van der Gaag's dismissal. On 19 December 2025, the club confirmed him as their new permanent head coach, beginning 1 January 2026. He will attain his UEFA Pro License in spring 2026. He was terminated five rounds before the end of the season on 14 April 2026, following five defeats out of six matches.

=== Managerial statistics ===
As of 16 May 2026

Managerial record by team and tenure
| Team | From | To | Record | | | | |
| Team | From | To | P | W | D | L | Win % |
|---|---|---|---|---|---|---|---|
| Zürich | 23 October 2025 | 14 April 2026 | 29 | 7 | 4 | 18 | 24.14 |
| Total | | | 29 | 7 | 4 | 18 | 24.14 |
