= Jonas Adjetey =

Ghanaian footballer (born 2003)

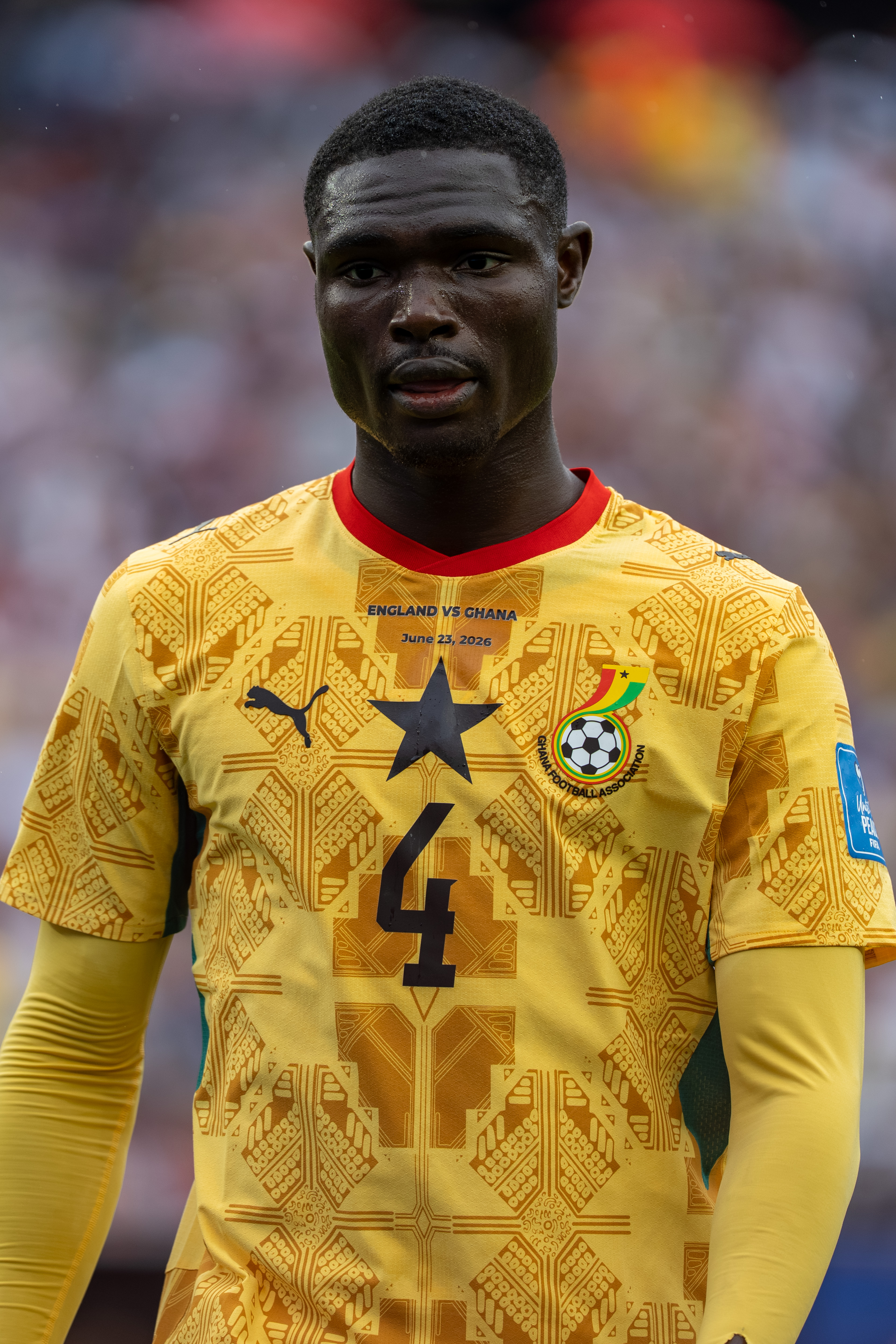
- Adjetey with Ghana in 2026

Personal information
- Full name: Jonas Adjei Adjetey
- Date of birth: 13 December 2003 (age 22)
- Place of birth: Accra, Ghana
- Height: 1.88 m (6 ft 2 in)
- Position: Centre-back

Team information
- Current team: VfL Wolfsburg
- Number: 18

Youth career
- 2013–2019: Teshie Football Academy
- 2019–2020: Great Olympics
- 2020–2022: Berekum Chelsea
- 2022: Basel

Senior career*
Years	Team	Apps	(Gls)
2022–2023	Basel U21	32	(0)
2023–2026	Basel	58	(0)
2026–	VfL Wolfsburg	6	(0)

International career^{‡}
2022	Ghana U20	2	(0)
2024–	Ghana	16	(1)
- * Club domestic league appearances and goals as of 12 September 2026 ‡ National team caps and goals as of 12 November 2026

Jonas Adjei Adjetey (born 13 December 2003) is a Ghanaian professional footballer who plays for German 2. Bundesliga side VfL Wolfsburg and the Ghana national team. He plays mainly in the position of centre-back, but can also play as full-back on either side.

== Club career ==
=== FC Basel ===
Born in Accra, Ghana, Adjetey played his youth football with the local clubs in that area. In 2020 he moved from the youth department of Great Olympics to the youth of Berekum Chelsea.

At the end of June 2022 FC Basel started their new training week with the Ghanaian guest Adjetey, following which he was offered a contract and thereafter joined the U-21 team, who played in the Promotion League, the third tier of Swiss football. That Autumn he played 16 of the U-21's 19 matches, then, during the winter break, he was brought up to Basel's first team for the second half of their 2022–23 FC Basel season. However, apart from test matches, he never had any competition appearances with the first team during this time.

Then at the beginning of their 2023–24 season Adjetey played his Swiss Cup debut for his new team in the away game on 20 August. Adjetey (19) played centre-back over the full 90 minutes, in a chain of three defenders, with the likewise young Nasser Djiga (20) and Finn van Breemen (20) on his sides. Both Djinga and van Breemen each scored a goal during the first half, as Basel went on to win 8–1 against amateur club FC Saint-Blaise.

Following this Adjetey returned to the U-21 team, so that he could obtain more playing experience, and he played nine further matches with them. Then, after playing in two test games for the first team, he played his domestic league debut for the club in the home away game in the Swissporarena on 17 December 2023 as Basel won 1–0 against Luzern.

Adjetey extended his contract with FC Basel until 2028 on 29 August 2024.

=== VfL Wolfsburg ===
On 2 February 2026, Adjetey signed for Bundesliga club VfL Wolfsburg on a contract until summer 2030, for an undisclosed fee reported to be around €10,000,000.

== International career ==
Adjetey was called up to the Ghana U-20 team for the first time in May 2022, to represent them in the 2022 Maurice Revello Tournament. He made his debut for them, and played the full 90 minutes, on 30 May 2022 against Mexico U-23. In the tournament's second match against Indonesia U-20 he came on as substitute.

Adjetey made his Ghana national team debut on 15 October 2024 in an Africa Cup of Nations qualifier against Sudan at the Benina Martyrs Stadium in Libya. He substituted Mohammed Salisu in the 73rd minute, as Sudan won 2–0.

In the World Cup qualifiers against Madagascar played in Morocco on 24 March 2025, Adjetey replaced injured Jerome Opoku in the 83rd which Ghana won 3–0.

On 2 June 2026, Adjetey was named in head coach Carlos Queiroz's 26-man squad for the 2026 FIFA World Cup.

== Career statistics ==
=== Club ===
As of match played 12 September 2026

Appearances and goals by club, season and competition
Club	Season	League			National cup		Continental		Other		Total	
Club	Season	Division	Apps	Goals	Apps	Goals	Apps	Goals	Apps	Goals	Apps	Goals
Berekeum Chelsea	2021–22	Ghana Premier League	1	0	—		—		—		1	0
Basel U21	2022–23	Swiss Promotion League	16	0	—		—		—		16	0
Basel U21	2023–24	Swiss Promotion League	16	0	—		—		—		16	0
Basel U21	Total		32	0	—		—		—		32	0
Basel	2023–24	Swiss Super League	11	0	1	0	—		—		12	0
Basel	2024–25	Swiss Super League	32	0	6	0	—		—		38	0
Basel	2025–26	Swiss Super League	15	0	1	0	7 (Note: One appearance in UEFA Champions League, six appearances in UEFA Europa League)	0	—		23	0
Basel	Total		58	0	8	0	7	0	0	0	73	0
VfL Wolfsburg	2025–26	Bundesliga	4	0	—		—		—		4	0
VfL Wolfsburg	2026–27	2. Bundesliga	2	0	1	0	—		—		3	0
VfL Wolfsburg	Total		6	0	1	0	—		—		7	0
Career total			97	0	9	0	7	0	0	0	113	0

=== International ===
As of match played 12 November 2026

Appearances and goals by national team and year
National team	Year	Apps	Goals
Ghana	2024	1	0
Ghana	2025	6	0
Ghana	2026	9	1
Total		16	1

Scores and results list Ghana's goal tally first, score column indicates score after each Adjetey goal.

List of international goals scored by Jonas Adjetey
No.	Date	Venue	Opponent	Score	Result	Competition
1	12 November 2026	Sekondi-Takoradi Stadium, Sekondi-Takoradi, Ghana	Somalia	1–0	2–0	2027 Africa Cup of Nations qualification

== Honours ==
Basel

- Swiss Super League: 2024–25
