= 2026–27 Swiss Challenge League =

Swiss Challenge League
- Season: 2026–27
- Dates: 24 July 2026 – May 2027
- Matches: 140
- Top goalscorer: Keasse Bah (Lausanne-Ouchy); Elio Rufener (Kriens); Malko Sartoretti (Lausanne-Ouchy); Varol Tasar (Yverdon) (All 4 goals)
- Biggest home win: 5–0; Winterthur–Wil (7 Aug '26)
- Biggest away win: 0–2; Kriens–Yverdon (7 Aug '26); 0–2; Rapperswil-Jona–Winterthur (21 Aug '26); 0–2; Wil–Kriens (22 Aug '26); 0–2; Kriens–Lausanne-Ouchy (4 Sep '26)
- Highest scoring: 4–5; Rapperswil-Jona–Wil (24 Jul '26)
- Longest winning run: Xamax (3) (rounds 1 to 3)
- Longest unbeaten run: Lausanne-Ouchy (7) (rounds 1 to 7); Yverdon (7) (rounds 1 to 7)
- Longest winless run: Nyon (7) (rounds 1 to 7)
- Longest losing run: Xamax (4) (rounds 4 to 7)
- Highest attendance: 7.300; Winterthur–Xamax (4 Sep '26)
- Lowest attendance: 355; Nyon–Rapperswil-Jona (31 Jul '26)
- All statistics correct as of 24 August 2026.

The 2026–27 Swiss Challenge League (referred to as the Dieci Challenge League for sponsoring reasons) is the 129th season of the second tier of competitive football in Switzerland and the 24th season under its current name.

== Teams ==
On 23 May 2026, Kriens returned to the Challenge League after a 4-year absence. On 12 May 2026, Winterthur, relegated from the Super League, returned to the second series after a 4-year absence. They replace last season's Challenge League champions Vaduz, who returned to the top flight after a 5-year absence, and Bellinzona, who were relegated to the Swiss Promotion League after 4 seasons in the Challenge League.

=== Team changes ===
Promoted from 2025–26 Swiss Promotion League	Relegated from 2025–26 Swiss Super League	Promoted to 2026–27 Swiss Super League	Relegated to 2026-27 Swiss Promotion League
Kriens	Winterthur	Vaduz	Bellinzona

=== Stadia and locations ===
Locations of clubs in the 2026-27 Swiss Challenge League teams

Team	Location	Stadium	Capacity	Ref
FC Aarau	Aarau	Stadion Brügglifeld	8,000	
Étoile Carouge FC	Carouge	Stade de la Fontenette	3,600	
SC Kriens	Kriens	Stadion Kleinfeld	3,500	
FC Stade Lausanne-Ouchy	Lausanne	Stade Olympique (Note: Stade-Lausanne-Ouchy's home stadium Stade Juan-Antonio-Samaranch in Lausanne can not accommodate SLO for the Challenge League. SLO will play at the Stade Olympique de la Pontaise in Lausanne.)	15,850	
FC Rapperswil-Jona	Rapperswil-Jona	Stadion Grünfeld	3,200	
FC Stade Nyonnais	Nyon	Stade de Colovray	7,200	
FC Wil 1900	Wil	Lidl Arena	6,958	
FC Winterthur	Winterthur	Stadion Schützenwiese	8,700	
Neuchâtel Xamax	Neuchâtel	Stade de la Maladière	11,997	
Yverdon-Sport	Yverdon	Stade Municipal	4,200	

No. of teams	Cantons	Team(s)
3
3	Vaud	Lausanne Ouchy, Nyon, Yverdon-Sport
2
2	St. Gallen	Rapperswil-Jona, Wil
1
1	Aargau	Aarau
1	Geneva	Étoile Carouge
1	Lucerne	Kriens
1	Neuchâtel	Xamax
1	Zurich	Winterthur

=== Personnel and kits ===
Team	Manager	Captain	Kit manufacturer	Shirt sponsor
Aarau	(Italy) Brunello Iacopetta	(Switzerland) Marco Thaler	Craft	Aargauische Kantonalbank
Étoile Carouge	(Brazil) Pedro Nogueira	(Switzerland) Ricardo Alves	Adidas	Scrasa
Kriens	(Austria) Michael Winsauer	(Switzerland) Lukas Riedmann	Erima	STS
Lausanne Ouchy	(Slovenia) Dalibor Stevanović	(Ivory Coast) Edmond Akichi	Macron	Cronos Finance
Nyon	(France) Aurélien Mioch	(Portugal) Lucas Ribeiro	Adidas	Dieci
Rapperswil-Jona	(Switzerland) Selcuk Sasivari	(Kosovo) Lorik Emini	Macron	Dieci
Wil	(Switzerland) Marco Hämmerli	(Switzerland) Yannick Schmid	Adidas	WeberPartner
Winterthur	(Switzerland) Patrick Rahmen	(Switzerland) Remo Arnold	Jako	Keller
Xamax	(Switzerland) Bruno Berner	(Kosovo) Eris Abedini	Capelli	Groupe E
Yverdon-Sport	(Switzerland) Martin Andermatt	(Switzerland) Anthony Sauthier	Macron	AON

=== Managerial changes ===
Team	Outgoing manager	Date of departure	Position in table	Incoming manager	Date of appointment
Nyon	(Switzerland) Andrea Binotto	30 June 2026	Pre-season	(France) Aurélien Mioch	1 July 2026
Xamax	(France) Anthony Braizat	30 June 2026	Pre-season	(Switzerland) Bruno Berner	1 July 2026

== Table ==
Pos	Team	Pld	W	D	L	GF	GA	GD	Pts	Promotion, qualification or relegation
1	Lausanne Ouchy	13	9	4	0	28	6	+22	31	Promotion to Swiss Super League
2	Winterthur	13	7	4	2	28	13	+15	25	Qualification for promotion play-off
3	Yverdon-Sport	13	6	5	2	23	14	+9	23	
4	Kriens	13	5	4	4	22	19	+3	19	
5	Xamax	13	5	2	6	16	20	−4	17	
6	Aarau	13	4	3	6	19	24	−5	15	
7	Étoile Carouge	13	3	5	5	14	19	−5	14	
8	Wil	13	3	5	5	21	27	−6	14	
9	Rapperswil-Jona	13	3	2	8	18	26	−8	11	
10	Nyon	13	2	2	9	13	34	−21	8	Relegation to Swiss Promotion League

Updated to match(es) played on 8 November 2026. Source: Swiss Challenge League
Rules for classification: 1) Points; 2) Goal difference; 3) Goals scored; 4) Head-to-head goal difference; 5) Head-to-head goals scored 6) Away goals scored; 7) Draw.

== Results ==
=== First and second rounds ===
Home \ Away	AAR	ETC	KRI	NYO	RAP	SLO	WIL	WIN	XAM	YVE
Aarau	—	1–2	2–2	2–1	3–2	1–1	0–3		2–1	
Étoile Carouge	3–0	—	2–2		2–1		1–1	0–1	0–1	0–2
Kriens		4–1	—	3–0	1–0	0–2	1–1	2–0		0–2
Nyon	2–1	0–0		—	1–2	1–5		2–2	1–3	
Rapperswil-Jona			1–1	1–4	—	0–3	4–5	0–2		2–0
Lausanne Ouchy		3–0		2–0	2–0	—	4–0		0–0	3–2
Wil	2–2		0–2	5–0	2–2		—		1–2	
Winterthur	2–1	2–2		4–0		1–1	5–0	—	4–0	2–2
Xamax	1–3		3–2		0–3	1–2		3–0	—	1–2
Yverdon-Sport	2–1	1–1	5–2	4–1		0–0	1–1		0–0	—

Updated to match(es) played on 8 November 2026. Source: Swiss Football League
Legend: Blue = home team win; Yellow = draw; Red = away team win.

=== Third and Fourth Rounds ===
Home \ Away	AAR	ETC	KRI	NYO	RAP	SLO	WIL	WIN	XAM	YVE
Aarau	—									
Étoile Carouge		—								
Kriens			—							
Nyon				—						
Rapperswil-Jona					—					
Lausanne Ouchy						—				
Wil							—			
Winterthur								—		
Xamax									—	
Yverdon-Sport										—

Updated to match(es) played on 7 August 2026. Source: Swiss Football League
Legend: Blue = home team win; Yellow = draw; Red = away team win.

== Season statistics ==
As of 7 September 2026

=== Top scorers ===
Rank	Player	Club	Goals
1	(Switzerland) Malko Sartoretti	Lausanne-Ouchy	5
2	(Ivory Coast) Keasse Bah	Lausanne-Ouchy	4
2	(Switzerland) Elio Rufener	Kriens	4
2	(Germany) Varol Tasar	Yverdon	4
5	(Nigeria) Peter Ambrose	Xamax	3
5	(Germany) Emilio Kehrer	Winterthur	3
5	(Switzerland) Albin Krasniqi	Kriens	3
5	(Switzerland) Elias Maluvunu	Winterthur	3
5	(Switzerland) Liridon Mulaj	Xamax	3
5	(Switzerland) Yannis Ryter	Rapperswil-Jona	3

=== Assists ===
Rank	Player	Club	Assists
1	(Switzerland) Théo Golliard	Winterthur	4
1	(Spain) Cobel Sow	Lausanne Ouchy	4
3	(Switzerland) Valon Fazliu	Yverdon	3

=== Hat-tricks ===
Player	For	Against	Result	Date

=== Clean sheets ===
Rank	Player	Club	Clean sheets
1	(Switzerland) Laurent Seji	Lausanne-Ouchy	5
2	(Austria) Markus Kuster	Winterthur	2
2	(Switzerland) Ruben Salchli	Kriens	2

=== Discipline ===
- Most yellow cards: 4
  - (Switzerland) Enea Heiniger (Kriens)
- Most red cards: 2
  - (Chad) Djawal Kaiba (Wil)

== Promotion play-off ==
The promotion play-off will be played between the eleventh placed team of the 2026–27 Swiss Super League and the runner up of the Swiss Challenge League following the conclusion of the regular season. The play-off is held over two legs, played home and away.
