= Noah De Ridder =

Belgian footballer (born 2003)

Personal information
- Date of birth: 8 October 2003 (age 23)
- Place of birth: Belgium
- Height: 1.80 m (5 ft 11 in)
- Position: Midfielder

Team information
- Current team: Lierse SK
- Number: 70

Youth career
- 2012–2022: Gent

Senior career*
Years	Team	Apps	(Gls)
2022–2024	Jong Gent	34	(0)
2022–2024	Gent	1	(0)
2024–2025	Jong Cercle	44	(9)
2025-	Lierse SK	5	(0)

International career^{‡}
2020	Belgium U17	4	(0)
- * Club domestic league appearances and goals as of 26 May 2026 ‡ National team caps and goals as of 25 January 2020

Noah De Ridder (born 8 October 2003) is a Belgian professional footballer who plays as a midfielder for Lierse SK.

== Career ==
Raised in Buggenhout, De Ridder attended Topsportschool in Ghent. He came through the academy system at Gent and has represented the Belgium national under-17 football team. He signed his first professional contract in November 2021. From the start of the 2022–23 season Gent head coach Hein Vanhaezebrouck gave young players such as Ibrahim Salah, Malick Fofana and De Ridder the chance to train with the first team. De Ridder made his league debut for the Gent first team on 11 September 2022 against Zulte Waregem.

On 6 January 2024, De Ridder signed a contract with Cercle Brugge until 30 June 2024, with an option to extend for the 2024–25 season. He was assigned to the reserve squad, Jong Cercle.
