= 2026–27 Promotion League =

Promotion League
- Season: 2026–27
- Dates: 31 July 2026 – 29 May 2027
- Matches: 143
- Goals: 490 (3.43 per match)
- Biggest home win: Grand-Saconnex 6–0 Saint-Prex (1 August 2026)
- Biggest away win: Luzern U-21 0–8 Schaffhausen (10 October 2026)
- Highest scoring: Schaffhausen 6–3 Young Boys U-21 (3 October 2026)
- Longest winning run: 6 matches Schaffhausen
- Longest unbeaten run: 9 matches Schaffhausen
- Longest winless run: 7 matches Bavois
- Longest losing run: 7 matches Bavois
- All statistics correct as of 15 November 2026.

The 2026–27 Promotion League season (known as the Hoval Promotion League for sponsorship reasons) is the 15th edition (13th under its current name) of the 3rd tier of the Swiss football league system under its current format.

== Team changes ==
=== Outgoing ===
==== Promoted to 2026–27 Challenge League ====
- SC Kriens

==== Relegated to 2026–27 1. Liga Classic ====
- FC Lausanne-Sport II
- Vevey-Sports

== League table ==
Pos	Team	Pld	W	D	L	GF	GA	GD	Pts	Promotion, qualification or relegation
1	Schaffhausen	15	11	2	2	36	17	+19	35	Promotion to Challenge League and qualification for Swiss Cup
2	Biel-Bienne	16	10	4	2	37	21	+16	34	Qualification for Swiss Cup
3	Bulle	16	10	3	3	35	22	+13	33	Qualification for Swiss Cup
4	Cham	16	10	3	3	33	20	+13	33	Qualification for Swiss Cup
5	Paradiso	17	9	4	4	35	19	+16	31	Qualification for Swiss Cup
6	Grand-Saconnex	17	9	0	8	35	29	+6	27	Qualification for Swiss Cup
7	Brühl	16	8	2	6	21	19	+2	26	Ineligible for promotion and the Swiss Cup
8	YF Juventus	16	8	1	7	27	24	+3	25	Qualification for Swiss Cup
9	Zürich U-21	17	6	5	6	31	30	+1	23	
10	Breitenrain	16	6	3	7	22	23	−1	21	Ineligible for promotion and the Swiss Cup
11	Basel U-21	17	6	2	9	27	33	−6	20	
12	Young Boys U-21	16	5	4	7	33	39	−6	19	
13	Saint-Prex	16	6	1	9	18	36	−18	19	
14	Luzern U-21	17	5	3	9	29	36	−7	18	Ineligible for promotion and the Swiss Cup
15	Kreuzlingen	16	4	3	9	25	32	−7	15	Ineligible for promotion and the Swiss Cup
16	Bavois	16	4	2	10	20	27	−7	14	
17	Lugano U-21	16	4	1	11	22	40	−18	13	Relegation to the 1. Liga Classic
18	Bellinzona	16	2	3	11	13	32	−19	9	Relegation to the 1. Liga Classic

Updated to match(es) played on 21 November 2026. Source: Erste Liga
Rules for classification: 1) Points; 2) Goal difference; 3) Goals scored; 4) Head-to-head goal difference; 5) Away goals scored; 6) Draw.

== Results ==
Home \ Away	BAS	BAV	BEL	BIE	BRE	BRU	BUL	CHA	GSA	KRE	LUG	LUZ	PAR	SPR	FCS	YB	YFJ	ZUR
Basel U-21	—	3–1				3–0	1–2		1–2			3–2	0–2		2–2			2–3
Bavois		—				0–0	3–0					0–1	4–1	0–2				2–2
Bellinzona	2–3	0–3	—		2–2	2–0	0–1			2–1		1–2						0–4
Biel-Bienne	2–2	2–0		—				2–2		3–1	5–2					2–4	4–2	
Breitenrain	2–0	1–0		0–4	—		2–2					1–0		3–0	0–1	4–2		
Brühl				0–1	2–1	—			1–0		1–0		0–2	4–1	1–1	4–2		3–1
Bulle				1–1			—		3–2				2–2	3–1	0–1	3–0		3–0
Cham	3–1	2–1	1–1		2–1	2–1	2–4	—	2–1			2–2	0–2					4–0
Grand-Saconnex		5–0	3–0	2–4	1–0				—		1–2		2–5	6–0	1–4	2–1	3–0	
Kreuzlingen	3–1	2–3			1–0	3–0	2–3	1–2	0–1	—		2–3						2–2
Lugano U-21	3–0	3–2	1–1				1–4	0–1		2–3	—	4–3					1–6	
Luzern U-21				0–1		0–2	2–3		5–1			—	1–2	2–3	0–8			1–1
Paradiso			4–0	1–1	1–2					1–1	1–0		—	5–0	1–2	2–2	0–1	
Saint-Prex	2–0		1–0	1–2				0–5			1–0			—		2–2	3–1	
Schaffhausen			1–0	3–2						3–0	2–1			1–0	—	6–3	0–3	
Young Boys U-21	0–2	2–1	3–2					1–3		5–2	3–1	2–2				—		
YF Juventus	2–3	1–0	2–0		3–1	0–2	2–1	2–0		1–1		0–3					—	
Zürich U-21				0–1	2–2				1–2		6–1		1–3	2–1	3–1	1–1	2–1	—

Updated to match(es) played on 21 November 2026. Source: Erste Liga
Legend: Blue = home team win; Yellow = draw; Red = away team win.
