= Berkay Dabanlı =

German footballer (born 1990)

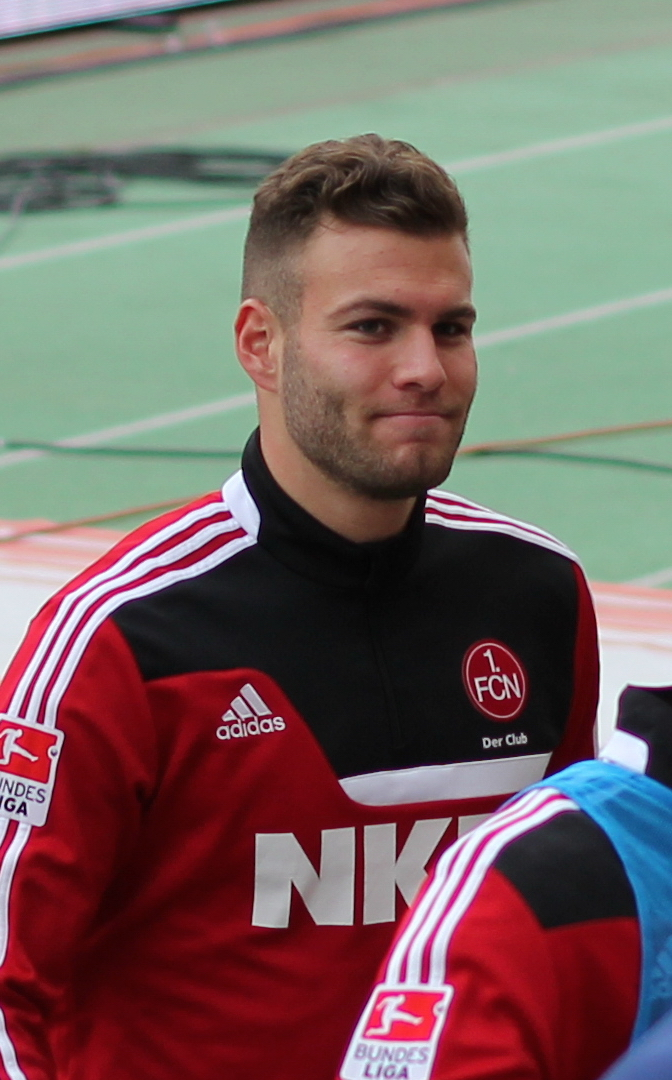
- Dabanli with FC Nurnburg in 2013.

Personal information
- Full name: Berkay Tolga Dabanlı
- Date of birth: 27 June 1990 (age 36)
- Place of birth: Frankfurt, West Germany
- Height: 1.90 m (6 ft 3 in)
- Position: Centre-back

Youth career
- –2004: Blau-Gelb Frankfurt
- 2004–2008: SG Rosenhöhe Offenbach
- 2008–2009: FSV Frankfurt

Senior career*
Years	Team	Apps	(Gls)
2009–2010	FSV Frankfurt II	29	(3)
2010–2011	Bayer 04 Leverkusen II	29	(1)
2011–2012	Kayserispor	10	(0)
2013–2014	1. FC Nürnberg	13	(0)
2013–2014	→ 1. FC Nürnberg II	3	(0)
2014–2016	Eskişehirspor	23	(1)
2017	Chemnitzer FC	12	(1)
2017–2018	Rot-Weiß Erfurt	18	(1)
2018–2019	Boluspor	1	(0)
2019–2020	Eskişehirspor	18	(0)
2020–2022	Rheindorf Altach	49	(0)
2022	Kocaelispor	12	(1)
2022–2024	Lausanne-Sport	44	(1)
2024–2025	Fatih Karagümrük	14	(1)
2025–2025	Rapperswil-Jona	22	(3)
- * Club domestic league appearances and goals as of 26 May 2026

Berkay Tolga Dabanlı (born 27 June 1990) is a German professional footballer who plays as a centre-back.

== Career ==
Dabanlı was born and raised in Germany and played until he was 18 for smaller clubs in and around his home town Frankfurt am Main. In 2008 however he managed to join 2. Bundesliga club FSV Frankfurt, the second most important club in Frankfurt. There he stayed two years and became a regular for the second team during his second season. In an interview Dabanlı revealed that he got in fact an offer by Eintracht Frankfurt, the leading club in Frankfurt, but his parents did not admit a move to such a big club since they wanted him to focus on school and to finally attain Abitur.

In 2010, he attracted the attention of Bayer Leverkusen, an UEFA Champions League regular for Germany. But also there he did not get beyond the second team. Subsequently, although having had offers by 2. Bundesliga clubs, he made a move to Turkey, the homeland of his ancestors, and played from July 2011 to December 2012 for Kayserispor in the Süper Lig. For them he also made his Süper Lig debut on 24 February 2012.

In January 2013 he signed a half year contract at Bundesliga club 1. FC Nürnberg, which was later extended until June 2015. In 2017, he had a week's trial with Scottish Premiership side Aberdeen, but was ultimately not offered a contract.

At the start of the 2018–19 season, Dabanli returned to Turkey, where he signed a contract with Süper Lig side Boluspor. In January 2019, he moved to Eskişehirspor in the Turkish second division; his second stint with the club. After 18 appearances in the TFF First League, he moved to Austrian Football Bundesliga club Rheindorf Altach in January 2020. Through two years in Vorarlberg, he made a total of 48 Bundesliga appearances.

In January 2022, Dabanlı once again returned to Turkey and joined second division club Kocaelispor.

On 5 July 2022, Dabanlı moved to Lausanne-Sport in Switzerland.
