= Andrej Bačanin =

Serbian footballer (born 2004)

Personal information
- Date of birth: 7 March 2007 (age 19)
- Place of birth: Belgrade, Serbia
- Height: 1.87 m (6 ft 2 in)
- Position: Midfielder

Team information
- Current team: FC Basel
- Number: 14

Youth career
- –2024: FK Čukarički

Senior career*
Years	Team	Apps	(Gls)
2024–2025	FK Čukarički	17	(1)
2025–	FC Basel	25	(0)
2025–	→ FC Basel U21 (loan)	3	(0)

International career^{‡}
2021	Serbia U15	2	(0)
2021–2023	Serbia U16	9	(0)
2023–2024	Serbia U17	6	(0)
2024–	Serbia U19	10	(1)
- * Club domestic league appearances and goals as of 26 May 2026 ‡ National team caps and goals as of 25 March 2025

Andrej Bačanin (Serbian Cyrillic: Андреј Бачанин; born 7 March 2007) is a Serbian professional footballer who plays as a midfielder for FC Basel.

== Club career ==
As a youth player, Bačanin joined the youth academy of Serbian side FK Čukarički and was promoted to the club's senior team ahead of the 2024–25 season. Following his stint there, he signed for Swiss side FC Basel in 2025.

== International career ==
Bačanin is a Serbia youth international. During November 2024 and March 2025, he played for the Serbia national under-19 football team for 2025 UEFA European Under-19 Championship qualification.

== Style of play ==
Bačanin plays as a midfielder. German news website OneFootball wrote in 2025 that he "is technically tidy, defensively minded, but capable of contributing in the attacking third".
