= 2026–27 FC Zürich season =

FC Zürich
2026–27 season
- Manager: Marcel Koller
- Stadium: Stadion Letzigrund
- Swiss Super League: Pre-season
- Swiss Cup: Pre-season

The 2026–27 season is the 131st in the history of Fussballclub Zürich and their tenth consecutive season in the Swiss Super League. The club will also compete in the Swiss Cup.

== Transfers ==
=== In ===
Pos.	Player	Transferred from	Fee	Date	Source
GK	(Austria) Heinz Lindner	(Switzerland) Young Boys	Free	1 July 2026	
MF	(Switzerland) Kevin Spadanuda	(Switzerland) Luzern	Free	13 July 2026	

=== Out ===
Pos.	Player	Transferred to	Fee	Date	Source
MF	(Colombia) Nelson Palacio	(United States) Real Salt Lake	Loan return	30 June 2026	
FW	(Guadeloupe) Matthias Phaëton	(Bulgaria) CSKA Sofia	Loan return	30 June 2026	
GK	(Switzerland) Yanick Brecher	Retiring		1 July 2026	
MF	(Angola) Ivan Cavaleiro	(Angola) Atlético Petróleos de Luanda	Free	1 July 2026	
DF	(Switzerland) Daniel Denoon	(Italy) Pisa	Loan made permanent	1 July 2026	

== Pre-season and friendlies ==
20 June 2026 Tournament	FC Dietikon 1908 (Switzerland)	1–1	(Switzerland) Zürich
11:00		Report
Note: Match comprising 45 minutes

20 June 2026 Tournament	Zürich (Switzerland)	3–0	(Switzerland) Young Fellows Juventus
12:00		Report
Note: Match comprising 45 minutes

27 June 2026 Friendly	Zürich (Switzerland)	3–2	(Switzerland) Schaffhausen
11:30

27 June 2026 Friendly	FC Thalwil (Switzerland)	4–6	(Switzerland) Zürich
16:30

4 July 2026 Friendly	Zürich (Switzerland)	2–3	(Switzerland) Kriens
16:00

11 July 2026 Friendly	Zürich (Switzerland)	1–2	(Switzerland) Stade Lausanne-Ouchy
10:00

18 July 2026 Friendly	Zürich (Switzerland)	2–3	(Germany) Greuther Fürth
14:00

== Competitions ==
=== Overall record ===
Competition	First match	Last match	Starting round	Record							
Competition	First match	Last match	Starting round	Pld	W	D	L	GF	GA	GD	Win %
Swiss Super League	26 July 2026		Matchday 1	2	1	0	1	3	3	+0	50.00
Swiss Cup				0	0	0	0	0	0	+0	—
Total				2	1	0	1	3	3	+0	50.00

Last updated: 1 August 2026
Source: Competitions

=== Swiss Super League ===
Pos	Team	Pld	W	D	L	GF	GA	GD	Pts	Qualification or relegation (Note: Teams play each other three times (33 matches), before the league is split into two groups (the top six and the bottom six).)
5	St. Gallen	9	4	1	4	16	19	−3	13	
6	Luzern	9	3	3	3	17	18	−1	12	
7	Zürich	9	3	2	4	14	20	−6	11	
8	Servette	9	3	1	5	11	13	−2	10	
9	Thun	9	3	1	5	15	23	−8	10	

Updated to match(es) played on 20 September 2026. Source: Brack Super League - Tabelle
Rules for classification: 1) Points; 2) Goal difference; 3) Goals scored; 4) Head-to-head goal difference; 5) Head-to-head goals scored 6) Away goals scored; 7) Draw.

==== Results by round ====
Round	1	2
Ground	A	H
Result	L	W
Position		

Updated to match(es) played on 1 August 2026. Source:
A = Away; H = Home; W = Win; D = Draw; L = Loss

==== Matches ====
26 July 2026 1	St. Gallen	2–1	Zürich	St. Gallen
16:30

1 August 2026 2	Zürich	2–1	Servette	Zürich
18:00
