= Livano Comenencia =

Footballer (born 2004)

Personal information
- Full name: Livano Shyron Liomar Comenencia
- Date of birth: 3 February 2004 (age 22)
- Place of birth: Breda, Netherlands
- Height: 1.85 m (6 ft 1 in)
- Position: Right-back

Team information
- Current team: Zürich
- Number: 8

Youth career
- 2012–2021: PSV

Senior career*
Years	Team	Apps	(Gls)
2021–2023	Jong PSV	59	(1)
2023–2025	Juventus Next Gen	67	(2)
2025–	Zürich	30	(0)

International career^{‡}
2019	Netherlands U15	7	(2)
2019–2020	Netherlands U16	3	(0)
2021	Netherlands U18	5	(1)
2022	Netherlands U19	6	(0)
2023	Netherlands U20	1	(0)
2024–	Curaçao	27	(4)
- * Club domestic league appearances and goals as of 28 September 2026 ‡ National team caps and goals as of 4 October 2026

Livano Shyron Liomar Comenencia (born 3 February 2004) is a professional footballer who plays as a right-back for Swiss Super League club Zürich. Born in the Netherlands, he plays for the Curaçao national team.

== Club career ==
Comenencia joined the youth academy of PSV in 2012, and was promoted to their reserves in 2021. On 13 February 2022, he signed a professional contract with PSV until 2025.

In 2021, he was included in The Guardian's yearly list of the 60 best talents born in 2004 in world football.

On 31 August 2023, Comenencia joined Italian side Juventus Next Gen, the reserve team of Juventus, for an undisclosed fee, signing a two-year contract with the Serie C club.

On 6 August 2025, Comenencia signed a four-season contract with Swiss Super League club Zürich in Switzerland.

== International career ==
Born in the Netherlands, Comenencia is of Curaçaoan descent. He was a youth international for the Netherlands.

In October 2024, he accepted a senior call-up from the Curaçao national football team for the games against Grenada of the 2024–25 CONCACAF Nations League.

On 18 May 2026, Comenencia was announced as a squad member for the 2026 FIFA World Cup, Curaçao's first ever appearance in the tournament. On 14 June 2026, in Curaçao's opening match against Germany, Comenencia scored Curaçao's first and only World Cup goal when he equalized at 1–1, in an eventual 7–1 defeat.

== Career statistics ==
=== Club ===
As of match played 19 September 2026

Appearances and goals by club, season and competition
Club	Season	League			Cup		Other		Total	
Club	Season	Division	Apps	Goals	Apps	Goals	Apps	Goals	Apps	Goals
Jong PSV	2021–22	Eerste Divisie	26	0	—		—		26	0
Jong PSV	2022–23	Eerste Divisie	33	1	—		—		33	1
Jong PSV	Total		59	1	0	0	0	0	59	1
Juventus Next Gen	2023–24	Serie C	36	2	—		2 (Note: Appearances in Copa Italia Serie C)	1	38	3
Juventus Next Gen	2024–25	Serie C	31	0	—		1	0	32	0
Juventus Next Gen	Total		67	2	—		3	1	70	3
Zürich	2025–26	Swiss Super League	24	0	1	0	—		25	0
Zürich	2026–27	Swiss Super League	6	0	1	0	—		7	0
Zürich	Total		30	0	2	0	—		32	0
Career total			156	3	2	0	3	1	161	4

=== International ===
As of match played 4 October 2026

Appearances and goals by national team and year
National team	Year	Apps	Goals
Curaçao	2024	4	0
Curaçao	2025	11	1
Curaçao	2026	12	3
Total		27	4

Scores and results list Curacao goal tally first, score column indicates score after each Comenencia goal

List of international goals scored by Livano Comenencia
No.	Date	Venue	Opponent	Score	Result	Competition
1	11 October 2025	Ergilio Hato Stadium, Willemstad, Curaçao	Jamaica	1–0	2–0	2026 FIFA World Cup qualification
2	6 June 2026	Ergilio Hato Stadium, Willemstad, Curaçao	Aruba	3–0	4–0	Friendly
3	14 June 2026	NRG Stadium, Houston, United States	Germany	1–1	1–7	2026 FIFA World Cup
4	27 September 2026	Ergilio Hato Stadium, Willemstad, Curaçao	Nicaragua	1–0	6–1	2026–27 CONCACAF Nations League A
