= Jeremy Agbonifo =

Swedish footballer (born 2005)

Personal information
- Full name: Jeremy Nosakhare Agbonifo
- Date of birth: 24 October 2005 (age 21)
- Place of birth: Gothenburg, Sweden
- Height: 1.78 m (5 ft 10 in)
- Position: Winger

Team information
- Current team: Jagiellonia Białystok (on loan from Lens)
- Number: 10

Youth career
- –2021: BK Häcken
- 2021–2024: FC Porto

Senior career*
Years	Team	Apps	(Gls)
2024–2025	BK Häcken	13	(2)
2025	→ Lens (loan)	8	(1)
2025–	Lens	0	(0)
2025	→ Basel (loan)	8	(0)
2026	→ BK Häcken (loan)	8	(1)
2026–	→ Jagiellonia Bialystok (loan)	5	(0)

International career^{‡}
2022–2024	Sweden U19	8	(2)
2024–2025	Sweden U21	8	(2)
- * Club domestic league appearances and goals as of 19:01, 20 September 2026 (UTC) ‡ National team caps and goals as of 21:53, 11 September 2025 (UTC)

Jeremy Nosakhare Agbonifo (born 24 October 2005) is a Swedish professional footballer who plays as a winger for Ekstraklasa club Jagiellonia Białystok, on loan from Lens.

== Club career ==
In November 2021, he left the academy of BK Häcken and signed for the counterpart in FC Porto. He made his youth international debut against Japan U17 in November 2022, and scored his first international goals against Wales U18 in June 2023. In June 2023 he trained with Häcken's city rivals, IFK Göteborg. He was then presented as a new US Lecce player, but the transfer fell through. Considering where his chances to play senior fotball would be greatest, Agbonifo saw the need to be "realistic" and returned to BK Häcken in February 2024.

He made his Allsvenskan debut on 20 July 2024, away against IFK Värnamo. Agbonifo then made his breakthrough in the 2024–25 UEFA Conference League qualifying phase. He scored his first senior goals against F91 Dudelange in July 2024, in what was also his first senior match on home ground. Being clear on goal both times, his first goal was a lob and the second a poke in between the goalkeeper's legs. Lastly, Agnobifo got one assist from a corner kick. Another goal came in the next round against Paide. He also scored in Häcken's last outing in the competition, a 3–2 loss to 1. FC Heidenheim.

His first Allsvenskan goal came on 25 August 2024 against Värnamo.

On 29 January 2025, Agbonifo joined Lens in France on loan with an option to buy. It was a paid loan for a fee of €1 million, with a €6.5 million purchase obligation triggered if Lens remained in Ligue 1. Two days later, he made his debut as a substitute against Montpellier, and scored after only one minute on the pitch.

After joining Lens on a permanent basis, Agbonifo spent the 2025–26 season on loans to Swiss club Basel and BK Häcken. On 21 July 2026, Agbonifo joined Polish club Jagiellonia Białystok on a season-long loan, with an option for a permanent transfer.

== International career ==
Born in Sweden, Agbonifo is of Nigerian descent. He is a youth international for Sweden.

== Career statistics ==
As of match played 20 September 2026

Appearances and goals by club, season and competition
Club	Season	League			National cup (Note: Includes Svenska Cupen, Swiss Cup)		Europe		Other		Total	
Club	Season	Division	Apps	Goals	Apps	Goals	Apps	Goals	Apps	Goals	Apps	Goals
Häcken	2024	Allsvenskan	13	2	1	0	5 (Note: Appearances in UEFA Conference League)	3	—		19	5
Lens (loan)	2024–25	Ligue 1	8	1	—		—		—		8	1
Basel (loan)	2025–26	Swiss Super League	8	0	3	1	5 (Note: Appearances in UEFA Europa League)	1	—		16	2
Häcken (loan)	2026	Allsvenskan	8	1	3	0	—		—		11	1
Jagiellonia Białystok (loan)	2026–27	Ekstraklasa	5	0	0	0	5	1	—		10	1
Career total			42	4	7	1	15	5	0	0	64	10
