= Carlos Semedo =

Portuguese soccer player

Personal information
- Full name: Carlos Miguel Correia Semedo
- Date of birth: January 21, 1980 (age 45)
- Place of birth: Lisbon, Portugal
- Height: 5 ft 11 in (1.80 m)
- Position(s): Defender / Midfielder

Youth career
- 1998–1999: Setúbal u19

Senior career*
Years	Team	Apps	(Gls)
1999–2001	Vitória F.C.	14	(1)
2001–2001	S.C. Campomaiorense	1	(0)
2002–2002	New England Revolution	9	(0)
2003–2004	Syracuse Salty Dogs		
2004–2007	Rochester Rhinos	17	(0)

International career
	Portugal U18	9	(2)
	Portugal U21	2	(0)
- * Club domestic league appearances and goals as of December 6, 2024

Carlos Miguel Correia Semedo (born January 21, 1980) is a Portuguese former footballer. Semedo featured for numerous clubs, including New England Revolution, Vitória F.C., S.C. Campomaiorense, Syracuse Salty Dogs, and the Rochester Rhinos. He was the first Portuguese player to sign with a Major League Soccer team.

== Career ==
=== Professional ===
During his career, Carlos totaled 41 games recorded. 9 appearances for the New England Revolution, 17 for the Rochester Rhinos, 1 for S.C. Campomaiorense, and 14 for Vitória F.C..

In his nine appearances for the New England Revolution, he totaled 621 minutes played, with one assist, coming in 2002

During his 14 appearances for Vitória F.C., totaling 765 minutes, Semedo got one goal and one assist, both coming in the 1999–2000 season.
