= Ilan Sauter =

American-born Swiss footballer (born 2001)

Personal information
- Full name: Ilan Benjamin Sauter
- Date of birth: 6 February 2001 (age 25)
- Place of birth: New York City, U.S.
- Height: 1.83 m (6 ft 0 in)
- Position: Leftback

Team information
- Current team: Zürich
- Number: 27

Youth career
- 2008–2011: FC Maur
- 2011–2019: Zürich

Senior career*
Years	Team	Apps	(Gls)
2018–2023	Zürich II	37	(1)
2019–2023	Zürich	3	(0)
2020–2022	→ Wil (loan)	45	(1)
2023–2025	Bellinzona	57	(7)
2025–	Zürich	28	(2)

International career^{‡}
2017	Switzerland U16	2	(0)
2017–2018	Switzerland U17	11	(1)
2019	Switzerland U18	1	(0)
2018–2020	Switzerland U19	6	(1)
2020	Switzerland U20	1	(0)
- * Club domestic league appearances and goals as of 28 September 2026 ‡ National team caps and goals as of 7 October 2020

Ilan Benjamin Sauter (born 6 February 2001) is a Swiss footballer who plays as a centre back for Swiss Super League club Zürich.

== Early life ==
Born in New York City, aged six Sauter moved to Switzerland, where he started playing for his local club FC Maur. Four years later, he moved to the youth academy of FC Zürich and was promoted to the first team in 2019, at the age of 18.

== Professional career ==
Sauter made his professional debut for Zürich in a 4–0 Swiss Super League loss to BSC Young Boys on 24 August 2019. Twelve months later, he joined Swiss club Wil on loan. On 10 July 2021, the loan was extended for the 2021–22 season.

On 3 July 2025, Sauter rejoined Zürich on a five-year contract.
