= Keasse Bah =

Ivorian footballer (born 2004)

Personal information
- Full name: Keasse Paul Henri Bah
- Date of birth: 17 December 2004 (age 21)
- Place of birth: Côte d'Ivoire
- Height: 1.83 m (6 ft 0 in)
- Positions: Midfielder; winger

Team information
- Current team: Dynamo Kyiv
- Number: 42

Youth career
- –2024: Société Omnisports de l'Armée

Senior career*
Years	Team	Apps	(Gls)
2024–2025	Ararat Yerevan	12	(4)
2025–2026	Stade Lausanne Ouchy	38	(11)
2026–	Dynamo Kyiv	4	(0)
- * Club domestic league appearances and goals

Keasse Bah (born 17 December 2004) is an Ivorian professional footballer who plays as a winger for Ukrainian Premier League club Dynamo Kyiv.

== Club career ==
Bah is a product of Société Omnisports de l'Armée.

In 2024, he joined Armenian club FC Ararat Yerevan, for which he played several games in the Armenian top tier.

Next season in 2025, Bah was signed by Swiss club FC Stade Lausanne Ouchy, where he played almost 40 league games in the Swiss 2nd tier competitions. Following the season, several European clubs showed interest in him.

On September 3, 2026, FC Dynamo Kyiv signed a five-year contract with 21-year-old Ivorian winger.
