= Lucas Ferreira (Portuguese footballer) =

Portuguese footballer

Personal information
- Full name: Lucas Manuel Silva Ferreira
- Date of birth: 25 November 2006 (age 19)
- Place of birth: Vila Real, Portugal
- Height: 1.85 m (6 ft 1 in)
- Position: Attacking midfielder

Team information
- Current team: Luzern
- Number: 73

Youth career
- 2017–2019: Team Zugerland
- 2019–2024: Luzern

Senior career*
| Years | Team | Apps | (Gls) |
| 2024–2025 | Luzern U21 | 9 | (2) |
| 2025– | Luzern | 43 | (7) |

International career
| 2024– | Portugal U20 | 2 | (0) |
- * Club domestic league appearances and goals as of 28 September 2026

Lucas Manuel Silva Ferreira (born 25 November 2006) is a Portuguese professional footballer who plays as an attacking midfielder for Swiss Super League club Luzern.

== Professional career ==
Ferreira is a product of the youth academies of the Swiss clubs Team Zugerland and Luzern. On 27 July 2025, he made his senior debut in a 3–2 Swiss Super League win over Grasshopper, where he scored the game-winning goal after coming on as a substitute. On 31 July 2025, he signed his first professional contract with Luzern until 2028.

== International career ==
Ferreira was called up to the Portugal U20s for a set of Under 20 Elite League matches in September 2025.

== Personal life ==
Ferreira was born in Portugal, but moved to Switzerland at the age of 2 with his family as his father started a construction job. His uncle Ricardo Silva was a youth product of Sporting CP, and his grandfather Domingos Silva played for Académico de Viseu in Portugal. Ferreira plays with his maternal grandfather's last name, Silva, after his grandfather died to honour him. Ferreira himself is a fan of FC Porto. On the same day Ferreira made his debut with Luzern, he found out his best friend passed away and had to fly out after the match. As of October 2025, he was in the process of obtaining a Swiss passport.
