= Damienus Reverson =

Dutch football player (born 2003)

Personal information
- Date of birth: 18 October 2003 (age 23)
- Place of birth: Amsterdam, Netherlands
- Position: Midfielder

Team information
- Current team: FC Zürich
- Number: 29

Youth career
- AVV Zeeburgia
- AZ Alkmaar

Senior career*
Years	Team	Apps	(Gls)
2021–2024	Jong AZ	51	(7)
2024–	FC Zürich	43	(10)
2024	FC Zurich II	6	(0)
- * Club domestic league appearances and goals as of 28 September 2026

Damienus Reverson (born 18 October 2003) is a Dutch professional footballer who plays for Swiss Super League club FC Zürich.

== Career ==
=== AZ Alkmaar ===
Reverson started with AVV Zeeburgia in his native Amsterdam but moved to the AZ Alkmaar academy to play age group football from under-12 level. In the summer of 2021 Reverson signed his first professional contract with AZ to keep him with the club until the end of the 2022–23 season, plus the option of an extra season was included.

Reverson made his Eerste Divisie debut for Jong AZ on the 18 March 2022, away at Jong FC Utrecht. He struck his first goal in the Eerste Divisie on 12 August 2022, against Helmond Sport in a 3–1 away victory at the Stadion De Braak.

=== FC Zürich ===
During the 2024–25 season, Reverson transferred to FC Zürich on an eighteen-month contract. Initially, he linked up with their U21 team in December 2024. He was promoted up to the Zurich first team, making his Swiss Super League debut on January 19, 2025, in a home match against Yverdon Sport. He scored his first goal for the club in a 3–1 defeat against Servette FC at Letzigrund on 9 March 2025. Reverson had made seven competitive appearances for the first team in total when, in April 2025, he was rewarded with a new four-year contract extending his stay with the club into 2029.

== Personal life ==
Born in the Netherlands, Reverson is of Ghanaian descent and holds dual Dutch-Ghanaian citizenship. He is the older brother of the footballer Paul Reverson.
