= 2024–25 FC Stade Lausanne Ouchy season =

FC Stade Lausanne Ouchy
2024–25 season
- Manager: Ricardo Dionísio (until 25 September); Dalibor Stevanović (from 27 September)
- Stadium: Stade Olympique de la Pontaise
- Swiss Challenge League: 9th
- Swiss Cup: Second round
- Top goalscorer: League: Warren Caddy (7); All: Warren Caddy (7)

The 2024–25 season is the 24th season in the history of FC Stade Lausanne Ouchy, and the club's first season back in the Swiss Challenge League. In addition to the domestic league, the team is scheduled to participate in the Swiss Cup.

== Transfers ==
=== In ===
Pos.	Player	Transferred from	Fee	Date	Source
FW	(France) Zachary Hadji	(Switzerland) Neuchâtel Xamax	Loan return	30 June 2024	
GK	(Switzerland) Nils de Mol	(Switzerland) Basel	Free	18 July 2024	

=== Out ===
Pos.	Player	Transferred to	Fee	Date	Source
MF	(Switzerland) Liridon Mulaj	(Germany) VfL Osnabrück	End of contract	1 July 2024	
DF	(Comoros) Abdallah Ali Mohamed		Released	1 July 2024	
FW	(France) Zachary Hadji		Released	1 July 2024	
FW	(Kosovo) Alban Ajdini	(Switzerland) Lausanne-Sport	Undisclosed	1 July 2024	
GK	(Switzerland) Nils de Mol		Contact terminated	3 January 2025	

== Friendlies ==
22 June 2024 Friendly	Lausanne-Sport (Switzerland)	3–2	(Switzerland) Stade Lausanne Ouchy
16:00 UTC+1

29 June 2024 Friendly	Stade Lausanne Ouchy (Switzerland)	2–3	(Switzerland) Étoile Carouge
11:00 UTC+1

5 July 2024 Friendly	Stade Lausanne Ouchy (Switzerland)	0–1	(Portugal) Braga
10:30 UTC+1

13 July 2024 Friendly	Stade Lausanne Ouchy (Switzerland)	2–2	(Switzerland) Biel-Bienne
11:00 UTC+1

24 July 2024 Friendly	FC Collex-Bossy (Switzerland)	v	(Switzerland) Stade Lausanne Ouchy
20:30 UTC+1

12 October 2024 Friendly	Stade Lausanne Ouchy (Switzerland)	0–4	(Switzerland) Sion	Lausanne
11:00 CET		Report	Miranchuk 21'; Souza 60'; Sorgić 76'; Djokic 86'	Stadium: Stade Olympique de la Pontaise

11 January 2025 Friendly	Stade Lausanne Ouchy (Switzerland)	3–2	(Switzerland) Bulle	Lausanne
11:00 CET		Report		Stadium: Stade Olympique de la Pontaise

18 January 2025 Friendly	Stade Lausanne Ouchy (Switzerland)	4–0	(Switzerland) Vevey-Sports	Lausanne
11:00 CET	Caddy 42'; Nathan Garcia 67'; Mahmoud 82'; Fargues 86'	Report		Stadium: Stade Olympique de la Pontaise

== Competitions ==
=== Overall record ===
Competition	First match	Last match	Starting round	Record							
Competition	First match	Last match	Starting round	Pld	W	D	L	GF	GA	GD	Win %
Swiss Challenge League	19 July 2024		Matchday 1	3	0	1	2	3	5	−2	0.00
Swiss Cup	16 August 2024		First round	0	0	0	0	0	0	+0	—
Total				3	0	1	2	3	5	−2	0.00

Last updated: 2 August 2024
Source: Soccerway

=== Swiss Challenge League ===
==== League table ====
Pos	Team	Pld	W	D	L	GF	GA	GD	Pts	Promotion, qualification or relegation
2	Aarau (Q)	36	16	13	7	63	45	+18	61	Qualification for promotion play-off
3	Étoile Carouge	36	15	9	12	57	46	+11	54	
4	Lausanne Ouchy	36	14	11	11	54	43	+11	53	
5	Wil	36	14	11	11	60	55	+5	53	
6	Vaduz	36	13	12	11	48	49	−1	51	Qualification for Conference League second qualifying round (Note: Vaduz qualified for the Conference League second qualifying round by winning the 2024–25 Liechtenstein Cup.)

Source: Swiss Challenge League
Rules for classification: 1) Points; 2) Goal difference; 3) Goals scored; 4) Head-to-head goal difference; 5) Head-to-head goals scored 6) Away goals scored; 7) Draw.
(Q) Qualified for the phase indicated

==== Results summary ====
Overall								Home						Away					
Pld	W	D	L	GF	GA	GD	Pts	W	D	L	GF	GA	GD	W	D	L	GF	GA	GD
3	0	1	2	3	5	−2	1	0	0	1	0	1	−1	0	1	1	3	4	−1

Last updated: 2 August 2024.

==== Results by round ====
Round	1	2	3
Ground	A	H	A
Result	L	L	D
Position	7		

Updated to match(es) played on 2 August 2024. Source:
A = Away; H = Home; W = Win; D = Draw; L = Loss

==== Matches ====
The match schedule was released on 18 June 2024.

19 July 2024 1	Neuchâtel Xamax	3–2	Stade Lausanne Ouchy	Neuchâtel
19:30	Demhasaj 9', 86', (yellow card) 82'; Durugbor 15'		Fargues 25', (yellow card) 73'; Pos (red card) 42'; Qarri 90+2', (red card) 90+4'	Stadium: Stade de la Maladière; Referee: Lionel Tschudi

26 July 2024 2	Stade Lausanne Ouchy	0–1	Schaffhausen	Lausanne
19:30	Camara (yellow card) 52'; Heule (yellow card) 90+4'		Giger 28', (yellow card) 90+1'; Schläppi (yellow card) 69'; Noël Yanik Sameël Wetz (yellow card) 84'	Stadium: Stade Olympique de la Pontaise; Referee: Johannes von Mandach

2 August 2024 3	Thun	1–1	Stade Lausanne Ouchy	Thun
20:15	Castroman 14'		Malula 46'	Stadium: Stockhorn Arena; Referee: Sandro Schärer

9 August 2024 4	Stade Lausanne Ouchy	1–1	Aarau	Lausanne
19:30 CEST	Mahmoud 25' (pen.); Breston Malula (yellow card) 86'	Report	Obexer (yellow card) 15'; Emmanuel Ernest 27'	Stadium: Stade Olympique de la Pontaise; Attendance: 773; Referee: (Switzerland) Désirée Grundbacher

25 August 2024 5	Vaduz	3–1	Stade Lausanne Ouchy	Vaduz
14:15 CEST	Eberhard 9' (yellow card) 64'; Liridon Berisha (yellow card) 24'; Fabrizio Cavegn 33' 81' (pen.); Hasler (yellow card) 57'; Del Toro (yellow card) 59'	Report	Heule (yellow card) 5'; Sahmkou Diaby Camara (yellow card) 31' (yellow-red card) 52'; Breston Malula 67'; Kadima (yellow card) 71'; Vachoux (yellow card) 81'	Stadium: Rheinpark Stadion; Attendance: 1,253; Referee: (Switzerland) Johannes von Mandach

30 August 2024 6	Stade Nyonnais	0–3	Stade Lausanne Ouchy	Nyon
19:30 CEST	Badara Diomandé (yellow card) 19'; Elias Pasche (yellow card) 28'; Victor Petit (yellow card) 48'; Ivann Strohbach (yellow card) 77'; Busset (yellow card) 90+1'	Report	Caddy 21' (yellow card) 23'; Kadima 33'; Fargues (yellow card) 63'; Kayombo 64'; Heule (yellow card) 90+4'	Stadium: Colovray Sports Centre; Attendance: 720; Referee: (Switzerland) Mirel Turkes

20 September 2024 7	Stade Lausanne Ouchy	0–0	Wil	Lausanne
19:30 CEST	Bayard (yellow card) 38'; Caddy (yellow card) 44'; N'Guessan (yellow card) 47'; Kadima (yellow card) 54'	Report	Jacovic (yellow card) 11'; Kastrijot Ndau (yellow card) 41'	Stadium: Stade Olympique de la Pontaise; Attendance: 475; Referee: (Switzerland) Désirée Grundbacher

24 September 2024 8	Bellinzona	2–1	Stade Lausanne Ouchy	Bellinzona
20:15 CEST	Nassim L'Ghoul 9'; Gorga (red card) 34'; Gloor (yellow card) 79'; Sangare 82'; Chukwuemeka (yellow card) 90'	Report	Fargues (yellow card) 16'; Caddy (yellow card) 68' (goal) 74'; Breston Malula (yellow card) 90' (yellow-red card) 90+2'	Stadium: Stadio Comunale Bellinzona; Attendance: 972; Referee: (Switzerland) Hajrim Qovanaj

27 September 2024 9	Stade Lausanne Ouchy	5–1	Étoile Carouge	Lausanne
19:30 CEST	Caddy 2' (yellow card) 45+6' (goal) 52'; Mergim Qarri 6' 61'; Vachoux (yellow card) 68'; Kayombo 72'	Report	Kamber (yellow card) 18'; Bruno Caslei 83'	Stadium: Stade Olympique de la Pontaise; Attendance: 4,000; Referee: (Switzerland) Logan Berchier

5 October 2024 10	Wil	2–2	Stade Lausanne Ouchy	Wil
18:00 CEST	Cueni (yellow card) 39'; Kastrijot Ndau 41' (yellow card) 84'; Akinola 45+1'; Simon Geiger (yellow card) 80'	Report	Heule (yellow card) 22' (goal) 37'; Nando Toggenburger 66'; Sahmkou Diaby Camara (yellow card) 71'; Fargues (yellow card) 78'	Stadium: Lidl Arena; Attendance: 1,081; Referee: (Switzerland) Hüseyin Sanli

19 October 2024 11	Stade Lausanne Ouchy	1–1	Bellinzona	Lausanne
18:00 CEST	Mahmoud 2'; Bayard (yellow card) 67'; Kayombo (yellow card) 77'	Report	Hervé Matondo (yellow card) 8'; Valon Hamdiu (yellow card) 13'; Nivokazi 44'; Néhemie Lusuena (yellow card) 63'	Stadium: Stade Olympique de la Pontaise; Attendance: 742; Referee: (Switzerland) Deborah Anex

25 October 2024 12	Étoile Carouge	1–1	Stade Lausanne Ouchy	Carouge
20:15 CET	Vincent Nvendo (yellow card) 39'; Kamber (yellow card) 58' (goal) 75'	Report	Kadima (yellow card) 45+1'; Breston Malula 90+4'	Stadium: Stade de la Fontenette; Attendance: 1,611; Referee: (Switzerland) Jonathan Jaussi

1 November 2024 13	Stade Lausanne Ouchy	2–2	Vaduz	Lausanne
19:30 CET	Kayombo 24'; Caddy 58'; Abi (yellow card) 90+3'	Report	Gasser 45+2'; Wieser (yellow card) 47'; Liridon Berisha (yellow card) 73'; Schwizer 77' (pen.); Mats Hammerich (yellow card) 82'	Stadium: Stade Olympique de la Pontaise; Attendance: 509; Referee: (Switzerland) Sven Wolfensberger

8 November 2024 14	Stade Lausanne Ouchy	6–2	Stade Nyonnais	Lausanne
19:30 CET	Kayombo 13'; Heule 55'; Caddy 69' 78'; Michel De Jesus Sousa Da Cruz 90'; Nathan Garcia 90+2'	Report	Malik Deme 24'; Koré 46'; Ruben Correia (yellow card) 49'; Ivann Strohbach (yellow card) 52'; Momodou Jaiteh (yellow card) 76'	Stadium: Stade Olympique de la Pontaise; Attendance: 752; Referee: (Switzerland) David Huwiler

29 November 2024 16	Stade Lausanne Ouchy	1–2	Xamax	Lausanne
19:30 CET	Caddy (yellow card) 15'; Breston Malula (yellow card) 39'; Fargues (yellow card) 58'; Nathan Garcia 63'	Report	Gonçalves (yellow card) 23'; Giovani Bamba (yellow card) 31'; Fatkič 40' (pen.); Paschal Durugbor (yellow card) 46'; Koné 65'; Marouane Calame (yellow card) 90+3'	Stadium: Stade Olympique de la Pontaise; Attendance: 530; Referee: (Switzerland) Hajrim Qovanaj

8 December 2024 17	Aarau	1–0	Stade Lausanne Ouchy	Aarau
16:30 CET	Fazliu 9' (yellow card) 80'; Obexer (yellow card) 33'	Report	Sutter (yellow card) 28'; Bayard (yellow card) 40'; Heule (yellow card) 87'	Stadium: Stadion Brügglifeld; Attendance: 4,248; Referee: (Switzerland) Désirée Grundbacher

13 December 2024 18	Stade Lausanne Ouchy	1–1	Thun	Lausanne
19:30 CET	Kayombo (yellow card) 3'; Mahmoud 23'; Caddy (yellow card) 54'; Nando Toggenburger (yellow card) 85'	Report	Franke (yellow card) 33'; Sessolo 87'; Bürki (yellow card) 90+3'	Stadium: Stade Olympique de la Pontaise; Attendance: 655; Referee: (Switzerland) Marijan Drmic

24 January 2025 19	Xamax	1–2	Stade Lausanne Ouchy	Neuchâtel
19:30 CET	Giovani Bamba (yellow card) 8'; Euclides Cabral 30' (yellow card) 41'; Mulaj (yellow card) 85'; Yoan Epitaux (yellow card) 90'	Report	Fargues (yellow card) 25'; Kayombo 33' (yellow card) 37'; Beney 76'	Stadium: Stade de la Maladière; Attendance: 2,612; Referee: (Switzerland) Désirée Grundbacher

31 January 2025 20	Stade Lausanne Ouchy	1–0	Étoile Carouge	Lausanne
19:30 CET	Caddy (yellow card) 21' (goal) 31'	Report	Rüfli (yellow card) 27'; Ninte (yellow card) 80'	Stadium: Stade Olympique de la Pontaise; Attendance: 533; Referee: (Switzerland) Anojen Kanagasingam

4 February 2025 15	Schaffhausen	0–1	Stade Lausanne Ouchy	Schaffhausen
19:30 CET		Report	Pos (yellow card) 53'; Breston Malula 90'; da Silva (yellow card) 90+6'	Stadium: FCS Arena Schaffhausen; Attendance: 542; Referee: (Switzerland) Johannes von Mandach

7 February 2025 21	Stade Lausanne Ouchy	2–4	Aarau	Lausanne
20:15 CET	Kayombo 2'; Heule 10'; Kadima (red card) 13'; da Silva (yellow card) 34'; Beney (yellow card) 55'; Nanizayamo (yellow card) 67'	Report	Aliu (yellow card) 34'; Bahloul (yellow card) 38' (goal) 72'; Gjorgjev 50'; Toure 56' 67'; Marcin Dickenmann (yellow card) 82'	Stadium: Stade Olympique de la Pontaise; Attendance: 732; Referee: (Switzerland) Hüseyin Sanli

15 February 2025 22	Bellinzona	0–1	Stade Lausanne Ouchy	Bellinzona
18:00 CET	Souza (yellow card) 35' (yellow-red card) 71'; Sabbatini (yellow card) 47'; Mihajlović (yellow card) 51'; Sutter (yellow card) 63'	Report	Caddy (yellow card) 79' (goal) 90+7' (pen.); Beney (yellow card) 90+2'	Stadium: Stadio Comunale Bellinzona; Attendance: 679; Referee: (Switzerland) Deborah Anex

21 February 2025 23	Stade Nyonnais	3–0	Stade Lausanne Ouchy	Nyon
19:30 CET	Quentin Gaillard (yellow card) 38'; Escorza 46'; Elias Pasche 64'; Gillies Richard (yellow card) 66'; Juan Martin Ghia 72'; Malik Sawadogo (yellow card) 74'	Report	Pos (yellow card) 42'; Sutter (yellow card) 55'; Lorng Axel Landry Nomel (yellow card) 69'; Nanizayamo (yellow card) 71'	Stadium: Colovray Sports Centre; Attendance: 519; Referee: (Switzerland) Anojen Kanagasingam

28 February 2025 24	Stade Lausanne Ouchy	2–1	Wil	Lausanne
19:30 CET	Akichi (yellow card) 14'; Rupp (yellow card) 26' (yellow-red card) 29'; Caddy 31' (yellow card) 55'; Kayombo 37' (yellow card) 64'; Issa Kaloga (yellow card) 83'; da Silva (yellow card) 88'	Report	Kastrijot Ndau (yellow card) 27' (goal) 41' (pen.); Jacovic (yellow card) 60'	Stadium: Stade Olympique de la Pontaise; Attendance: 489; Referee: (Switzerland) Marijan Drmic

=== Swiss Cup ===
17 August 2024 First round	FC Echallens	1–6	Stade Lausanne Ouchy	Échallens
17:00	Lucas Valle 46'	Report	Nathan Garcia 33' 43' 79'; Mahmoud 35'; Heule 59'; Nando Toggenburger 77'	Stadium: Sportplatz 3 Sapins; Attendance: 583; Referee: (Switzerland) Hajrim Qovanaj

14 September 2024 Second round	FC Langenthal	1–0	Stade Lausanne Ouchy	Langenthal
15:00	Amel Rustemoski 2' (yellow card) 45'; Yassine Bouazzi (yellow card) 54'; Stefano Cirelli (yellow card) 76'	Report	Mahmoud (yellow card) 48'; Pos (yellow card) 53'	Stadium: Hauptplatz Rankmatte; Attendance: 920; Referee: (Switzerland) Désirée Grundbacher
