= 2024–25 FC Aarau season =

FC Aarau
2024–25 season
- Manager: Brunello Iacopetta
- Stadium: Stadion Brügglifeld
- Swiss Challenge League: 10th
- Swiss Cup: Pre-season

The 2024–25 season is the 123rd season in the history of FC Aarau, and the club's 10th consecutive season in the Swiss Challenge League. In addition to the domestic league, the team is scheduled to participate in the Swiss Cup.

== Squad ==
As of 16 July 2024

Note: Flags indicate national team as defined under FIFA eligibility rules; some limited exceptions apply. Players may hold more than one non-FIFA nationality.

No.	Pos.	Nation	Player
1	GK	SUI	Marvin Hübel
2	DF	SUI	Marco Thaler
4	DF	SUI	Binjamin Hasani
5	DF	GHA	David Acquah
6	MF	SUI	Izer Aliu
7	MF	GER	Amr Khaled (on loan from Al Ahly)
8	MF	SUI	Olivier Jäckle (Captain)
9	FW	SUI	Yannick Toure
10	MF	SUI	Valon Fazliu
11	MF	KOS	Milot Avdyli
13	MF	GBS	Ivo Candé
14	DF	SUI	Fabrice Suter
15	DF	SUI	Serge Müller

No.	Pos.	Nation	Player
17	FW	SUI	Henri Koide
19	MF	SUI	Silvan Schwegler
21	MF	SUI	Noah Jakob
22	DF	SUI	Lenny Janko
23	MF	MKD	Nikola Gjorgjev
24	FW	LBR	Emmanuel Ernest
25	MF	SUI	Dorian Derbaci
27	DF	SUI	Linus Obexer
29	DF	SUI	Marcin Dickenmann
30	GK	SUI	Andreas Hirzel
32	FW	PAR	Raúl Bobadilla
38	DF	SUI	Ryan Kessler
49	MF	SUI	Esey Gebreyesus

=== Out on loan ===
Note: Flags indicate national team as defined under FIFA eligibility rules; some limited exceptions apply. Players may hold more than one non-FIFA nationality.

No.	Pos.	Nation	Player
—	DF	SUI	Flavio Caserta (at Kriens until 30 June 2024)
—	MF	SUI	Nik Dubler (at Schötz until 30 June 2024)

No.	Pos.	Nation	Player

== Transfers ==
=== In ===
Pos.	Player	Transferred to	Fee	Date	Source
FW	(Paraguay) Raúl Bobadilla	(Switzerland) Schaffhausen	Free	1 July 2024	

=== Out ===
Pos.	Player	Transferred to	Fee	Date	Source
FW	(Kosovo) Milot Avdyli	(Ukraine) Vorskla Poltava	Undisclosed	3 January 2025	

== Friendlies ==
=== Pre-season ===
25 June 2024 Friendly	FC Olten (Switzerland)	0–5	(Switzerland) Aarau
18:30

29 June 2024 Friendly	Aarau (Switzerland)	3–3	(Switzerland) Kriens
16:00

6 July 2024 Friendly	Lugano (Switzerland)	0–1	(Switzerland) Aarau	Caslano
14:00			Dickenmann 73'	Stadium: Centro Sportivo Roque Maspoli

13 July 2024 Friendly	Young Boys (Switzerland)	1–0	(Switzerland) Aarau

23 July 2024 Friendly	Rapperswil-Jona (Switzerland)	v	(Switzerland) Aarau

== Competitions ==
=== Overall record ===
Competition	First match	Last match	Starting round	Record							
Competition	First match	Last match	Starting round	Pld	W	D	L	GF	GA	GD	Win %
Swiss Challenge League	19 July 2024		Matchday 1	2	0	1	1	3	5	−2	0.00
Swiss Cup	17 August 2024			0	0	0	0	0	0	+0	—
Total				2	0	1	1	3	5	−2	0.00

Last updated: 26 July 2024
Source: Soccerway

=== Swiss Challenge League ===
==== League table ====
Pos	Team	Pld	W	D	L	GF	GA	GD	Pts	Promotion, qualification or relegation
1	Thun (C, P)	36	21	9	6	70	39	+31	72	Promotion to Swiss Super League
2	Aarau (Q)	36	16	13	7	63	45	+18	61	Qualification for promotion play-off
3	Étoile Carouge	36	15	9	12	57	46	+11	54	
4	Lausanne Ouchy	36	14	11	11	54	43	+11	53	
5	Wil	36	14	11	11	60	55	+5	53	

Source: Swiss Challenge League
Rules for classification: 1) Points; 2) Goal difference; 3) Goals scored; 4) Head-to-head goal difference; 5) Head-to-head goals scored 6) Away goals scored; 7) Draw.
(C) Champions; (P) Promoted; (Q) Qualified for the phase indicated

==== Results summary ====
Overall								Home						Away					
Pld	W	D	L	GF	GA	GD	Pts	W	D	L	GF	GA	GD	W	D	L	GF	GA	GD
17	7	5	5	27	21	+6	26	3	2	4	8	11	−3	4	3	1	19	10	+9

Last updated: 8 December 2024.

==== Results by round ====
Round	1	2	3	4	5	6	7	8	9	10	11	12	13	14	15	16	17	18
Ground	H	A	H	A	H	H	A	H	A	H	A	H	A	A	H	A	H	A
Result	L	D	L	D	W	L	W	L	W	D	W	W	L	W	D	D	W	
Position	10	7	9	9	9	10	7	7	7	6	5	4	4	4	4	4	4	

Updated to match(es) played on 8 December 2024. Source:
A = Away; H = Home; W = Win; D = Draw; L = Loss

==== Matches ====
The match schedule was released on 18 June 2024.

19 July 2024 1	Aarau	1–3	Thun	Aarau
20:15	Bobadilla (yellow card) 45'; Koide (yellow card) 65', (goal) 85'		Gutbub 7', 44'; Frith (yellow card) 82'; Matoshi 83'	Stadium: Stadion Brügglifeld; Referee: Lukas Fähndrich

26 July 2024 2	Wil	2–2	Aarau	Wil
20:15	Ndau 13' (pen.), (yellow card) 70'; Borges 9'		Ernest (yellow card) 39', (goal) 61'; Dickenmann (yellow card) 45+1' (yellow-red card) 73'; Avdyli 55'	Stadium: Sportpark Bergholz; Attendance: 1,534; Referee: Tobias Thies

3 August 2024 3	Aarau	1–3	Neuchâtel Xamax	Aarau
				Stadium: Stadion Brügglifeld

9 August 2024 4	Stade Lausanne Ouchy	1–1	Aarau	Lausanne
19:30 CET	Mahmoud 25' (pen.); Breston Malula (yellow card) 86'	Report	Obexer (yellow card) 15'; Emmanuel Ernest 27'	Stadium: Stade Olympique de la Pontaise; Attendance: 773; Referee: (Switzerland) Désirée Grundbacher

24 August 2024 5	Aarau	1–0	Étoile Carouge	Aarau
18:00 CET	Koide 14' (yellow card) 53'; Gjorgjev (yellow card) 56'; Noah Jakob (yellow card) 62'; Marvin Hübel (yellow card) 90+2'	Report	Rüfli (yellow card) 41'; Camara (yellow card) 41'; Bruno Caslei (yellow card) 64'	Stadium: Stadion Brügglifeld; Attendance: 5,266; Referee: (Switzerland) Nico Gianforte

31 August 2024 6	Aarau	1–2	Bellinzona	Aarau
18:00 CET	Milot Avdyli 17'; Noah Jakob (yellow card) 39'; Obexer (yellow card) 58'	Report	Nivokazi 28'; Néhemie Lusuena (yellow card) 45+1'; Mihajlović (yellow card) 61'; Sauter 65'; Sangare (yellow card) 68'	Stadium: Stadion Brügglifeld; Attendance: 4,166; Referee: (Switzerland) Désirée Grundbacher

20 September 2024 7	Vaduz	2–5	Aarau	Vaduz
20:15 CET	Hasler 5'; Gasser (yellow card) 16'; Fabrizio Cavegn 19'	Report	Koide 18'; Acquah (yellow card) 29'; Toure 38' 63'; Liridon Berisha 43' (o.g.); Gjorgjev (yellow card) 44'; Emmanuel Ernest 89'	Stadium: Rheinpark Stadion; Attendance: 1,378; Referee: (Switzerland) Hajrim Qovanaj

23 September 2024 8	Aarau	1–2	Schaffhausen	Aarau
20:15 CET	Fazliu 45+1'; Marcin Dickenmann (yellow card) 57'	Report	Gabriele De Donno 9'; Marc Giger 65'; Gianni De Nitti (yellow card) 86'	Stadium: Stadion Brügglifeld; Attendance: 3,915; Referee: (Switzerland) Hüseyin Sanli

27 September 2024 9	Stade Nyonnais	1–2	Aarau	Nyon
19:30 CET	Darian Yana (yellow card) 34'; Ruben Correia (yellow card) 48'; Luca Gazzetta (yellow card) 59'; Busset 68'; Escorza (yellow card) 71'; Quentin Gaillard (yellow card) 90+3'	Report	Toure 14'; Obexer (yellow card) 41'; Gjorgjev 49'; Marcin Dickenmann (yellow card) 76'; Acquah (yellow card) 89'	Stadium: Centre sportif de Colovray; Attendance: 570; Referee: (Switzerland) Alessandro Dudic

5 October 2024 10	Aarau	0–0	Vaduz	Aarau
18:00 CET	Acquah (yellow card) 24'; Marcin Dickenmann (yellow card) 72'; Koide (yellow card) 87'	Report	Mats Hammerich (yellow card) 34'; Emini (yellow card) 42'; Jonathan De Donno (yellow card) 52'; Traber (yellow card) 78'; Büchel (yellow card) 88'; Hasler (yellow card) 89'	Stadium: Stadion Brügglifeld; Attendance: 4,460; Referee: (Switzerland) Luca Piccolo

18 October 2024 11	Schaffhausen	0–3	Aarau	Schaffhausen
20:15 CET	Arbnor Hasani (yellow card) 51'	Report	Koide 13'; Fazliu 37' (pen.); Toure 43'	Stadium: FCS Arena Schaffhausen; Attendance: 1,679; Referee: (Switzerland) Urs Schnyder

25 October 2024 12	Aarau	1–0	Stade Nyonnais	Aarau
20:15 CET	Obexer (yellow card) 17'; Odutayo 65'; Gjorgjev (yellow card) 90+3'	Report	De Pierro (yellow card) 43'; Quentin Gaillard (yellow card) 53'	Stadium: Stadion Brügglifeld; Attendance: 4,131; Referee: (Switzerland) Hajrim Qovanaj

1 November 2024 13	Étoile Carouge	2–1	Aarau	Carouge
20:15 CET	Luca Sestito (yellow card) 25'; Marcin Dickenmann 27' (o.g.); Oscar Correia 44' (yellow card) 67' (yellow-red card) 67'; Rüfli (yellow card) 67'; Vincent Ferrier (yellow card) 67'; Mussa Diallo (yellow card) 90+4'	Report	Fazliu 63' (pen.); Marvin Hübel (yellow card) 67'; Acquah (yellow card) 81'	Stadium: Stade de la Fontenette; Attendance: 1,209; Referee: (Switzerland) Maxime Odiet

9 November 2024 14	Bellinzona	1–4	Aarau	Bellinzona
18:00 CET	Johan Nkama (yellow card) 31'; Nivokazi 52'; Sangare (yellow card) 63'; Valon Hamdiu (yellow card) 69'; Mihajlović (yellow card) 83'	Report	Aliu (yellow card) 12'; Fazliu 21' 63' (pen.) (yellow card) 77'; Gjorgjev 36'; Fofana 40'; Obexer (yellow card) 85'	Stadium: Stadio Comunale Bellinzona; Attendance: 851; Referee: (Switzerland) Désirée Grundbacher

24 November 2024 15	Aarau	1–1	Wil	Aarau
14:15 CET	Marcin Dickenmann (yellow card) 51'; Derbaci 90+1'	Report	Maier 15'; Guzzo (yellow card) 24'; Simon Geiger (yellow card) 55'; Abdullah Laidani (yellow card) 76'; Aaron Appiah (yellow card) 83'	Stadium: Stadion Brügglifeld; Attendance: 4,911; Referee: (Switzerland) Marijan Drmic

30 November 2024 16	Thun	1–1	Aarau	Thun
18:00 CET	Janjičić 8'; Bürki (yellow card) 45+1'; Genís Montolio (yellow card) 60'	Report	Fazliu (yellow card) 8'; Toure 46'; Ryan Kessler (yellow card) 53'; Marco Thaler (yellow card) 61'; Janko (yellow card) 90+1'	Stadium: Stockhorn Arena; Attendance: 4,533; Referee: (Switzerland) Johannes von Mandach

8 December 2024 17	Aarau	1–0	Stade Lausanne Ouchy	Aarau
16:30 CET	Fazliu 9' (yellow card) 80'; Obexer (yellow card) 33'	Report	Sutter (yellow card) 28'; Bayard (yellow card) 40'; Heule (yellow card) 87'	Stadium: Stadion Brügglifeld; Attendance: 4,248; Referee: (Switzerland) Désirée Grundbacher

13 December 2024 18	Xamax	–	Aarau	Neuchâtel
20:15 CET				Stadium: Stade de la Maladière

=== Swiss Cup ===
17 August 2024 1st Round	FC Suhr	0–4	Aarau	Suhr
17:00		Report	Derbaci 37'; Jäckle 41'; Milot Avdyli 60'; Toure 77'	Stadium: Sportanlage Hofstattmatten

15 September 2024 2nd Round	Aarau	1–0	Luzern	Aarau
16:00 CET	Milot Avdyli (yellow card) 54'; Obexer (yellow card) 60' (yellow-red card) 90+6'; Jäckle (yellow card) 75'; Toure 82'; Marvin Hübel (yellow card) 90+5'	Report	Rrudhani (yellow card) 17' (yellow-red card) 70'	Stadium: Stadion Brügglifeld; Attendance: 8,450; Referee: (Switzerland) Fedayi San

5 December 2024 Last 16	Aarau	0–1	Étoile Carouge	Aarau
20:00 CET	Marcin Dickenmann (yellow card) 65'; Milot Avdyli (yellow card) 82'; Marco Thaler (yellow card) 90+3'	Report	Bruno Caslei 70' (yellow card) 71'; El Jaouhari (yellow card) 79'	Stadium: Stadion Brügglifeld; Attendance: 3,532; Referee: (Switzerland) Sven Wolfensberger
