= 2023–24 FC Stade Lausanne Ouchy season =

FC Stade Lausanne Ouchy
2023–24 season
- Manager: Anthony Braizat (until 13 November); Ricardo Dionisio (from 15 November)
- Stadium: Stade Olympique de la Pontaise
- Swiss Super League: 12th
- Swiss Cup: Round 3

The 2023–24 season is FC Stade Lausanne Ouchy's 123rd season in existence and first ever in the Swiss Super League. They are also competing in the Swiss Cup.

== Players ==
=== First-team squad ===
As of 6 January 2024

Note: Flags indicate national team as defined under FIFA eligibility rules; some limited exceptions apply. Players may hold more than one non-FIFA nationality.

No.	Pos.	Nation	Player
1	GK	SUI	Dany da Silva
4	DF	USA	Lucas Pos
5	DF	KOS	Lavdrim Hajrulahu
6	MF	ANG	Giovani Bamba
7	FW	FRA	Charles Abi
8	MF	FRA	Romain Bayard
9	FW	FRA	Zachary Hadji
10	MF	KOS	Mergim Qarri
11	FW	GER	Gabriel Kyeremateng (on loan from Beveren)
12	GK	SUI	Noah Noverraz
14	MF	ESP	Ismaël Gharbi (on loan from PSG)
15	MF	GHA	Emmanuel Essiam (on loan from Basel)
16	MF	SUI	Mischa Eberhard
17	MF	KOS	Alban Ajdini
18	MF	SUI	Liridon Mulaj

No.	Pos.	Nation	Player
19	DF	BFA	Dylan Ouédraogo
20	FW	SUI	Nathan Garcia
21	DF	SUI	Linus Obexer
22	DF	SUI	Marc Tsoungui
23	DF	FRA	Rayan Kadima
24	MF	CIV	Edmond Akichi
27	DF	SEN	Lamine Gassama
28	MF	FRA	Elies Mahmoud
29	DF	COM	Abdallah Ali Mohamed
30	GK	SUI	Tristan Zesiger
49	DF	FRA	Sahmkou Camara
74	GK	FRA	Jérémy Vachoux
76	MF	KOS	Valon Hamdiu
77	DF	SUI	Heule

=== On loan ===
Note: Flags indicate national team as defined under FIFA eligibility rules; some limited exceptions apply. Players may hold more than one non-FIFA nationality.

No.	Pos.	Nation	Player
31	FW	FRA	Florian Danho (at Famalicão until 30 June 2024)

== Transfers ==
=== In ===
Pos.	Player	Transferred from	Fee	Date	Source
MF	(France) Elies Mahmoud	(France) Le Havre		11 July 2023	
GK	(Spain) Jérémy Vachoux	(Venezuela) Carabobo	Free	26 July 2023	
MF	(Spain) Ismaël Gharbi	(France) Paris Saint-Germain	Loan	1 September 2023	

=== Out ===
Pos.	Player	Transferred to	Fee	Date	Source

== Pre-season and friendlies ==
Win Draw Loss Fixtures

7 July 2023 Friendly	Stade Lausanne Ouchy (Switzerland)	2–1	(Switzerland) Grasshoppers

13 July 2023 Friendly	Stade Lausanne Ouchy (Switzerland)	2–2	(France) Paris FC

6 January 2024 Friendly	Thun (Switzerland)	0–1	(Switzerland) Stade Lausanne Ouchy

== Competitions ==
=== Overall record ===
Competition	First match	Last match	Starting round	Final position	Record							
Competition	First match	Last match	Starting round	Final position	Pld	W	D	L	GF	GA	GD	Win %
Swiss Super League	July 2023	May 2024	Matchday 1		18	2	5	11	19	38	−19	11.11
Swiss Cup	August 2023		Round 1	Round 3	3	1	2	0	6	2	+4	33.33
Total					21	3	7	11	25	40	−15	14.29

Last updated: 16 December 2023
Source: Soccerway

=== Swiss Super League ===
==== League table ====
Pos	Team	Pld	W	D	L	GF	GA	GD	Pts	Qualification or relegation (Note: Teams played each other three times (33 matches), before the league was split into two groups (the top six and the bottom six).)
8	Basel	38	13	10	15	45	52	−7	49	
9	Yverdon-Sport	38	13	8	17	50	71	−21	47	
10	Lausanne-Sport	38	11	12	15	48	53	−5	45	
11	Grasshopper (O)	38	10	8	20	41	49	−8	38	Qualification for the Relegation play-off
12	Lausanne Ouchy (R)	38	7	8	23	40	77	−37	29	Relegation to Swiss Challenge League

Source: Swiss Super League
Rules for classification: 1) Points; 2) Goal difference; 3) Goals scored; 4) Head-to-head goal difference; 5) Head-to-head goals scored 6) Away goals scored; 7) Draw.
(O) Play-off winners; (R) Relegated

==== Results summary ====
Overall								Home						Away					
Pld	W	D	L	GF	GA	GD	Pts	W	D	L	GF	GA	GD	W	D	L	GF	GA	GD
18	2	5	11	19	38	−19	11	1	4	4	10	20	−10	1	1	7	9	18	−9

Last updated: 16 December 2023.

==== Results by round ====
Round	1	2	3	4	5	6	7	8	9	10	11	12	13	14	15	16	17	18
Ground	H	A	H	H	A	H	A	H	A	A	H	A	H	A	A	H	A	H
Result	L	L	D	L	L	W	L	D	W	L	D	D	L	L	L	D	L	L
Position																		

Updated to match(es) played on 16 December 2023. Source:
A = Away; H = Home; W = Win; D = Draw; L = Loss; P = Postponed

==== Matches ====
	Stade Lausanne Ouchy	v	Stade Lausanne Ouchy
CET (UTC+1)			Stadium: Letzigrund

	v	Stade Lausanne Ouchy
CET (UTC+1)

=== Swiss Cup ===
August 2023 Round 1	–	Stade Lausanne Ouchy
CEST (UTC+2)
