= 2022–23 Neuchâtel Xamax FCS season =

Neuchâtel Xamax FCS
2022–23 season
- Chairman: Christian Binggeli
- Manager: Andrea Binotto (until 28 August); Jeff Saibene (from 29 August)
- Stadium: Stade de la Maladière
- Swiss Challenge League: 10th
- Swiss Cup: Round 2
- All statistics correct as of 25 November 2022.

The 2022–23 season is the 111th season in the history of Neuchâtel Xamax FCS and their third consecutive season in the second division of Swiss football. The club are participating in Swiss Challenge League and the Swiss Cup. The season covers the period from 1 July 2022 to 30 June 2023.

== Players ==
As of 11 August 2022

Note: Flags indicate national team as defined under FIFA eligibility rules; some limited exceptions apply. Players may hold more than one non-FIFA nationality.

No.	Pos.	Nation	Player
1	GK	FRA	Théo Guivarch
3	DF	FRA	Mathieu Gonçalves
4	DF	SUI	Liridon Berisha
5	DF	SWE	Mirza Mujčić
6	MF	SUI	Fabio Saiz
7	MF	SLO	Kenan Fatkic
8	MF	SUI	Alexandre Pasche
10	MF	ITA	Danilo Del Toro
11	FW	SUI	Henri Koide (on loan from Zürich)
12	MF	SUI	Max Veloso
14	FW	SUI	Raphaël Nuzzolo
15	DF	SUI	Yoan Epitaux
17	FW	CIV	Soumaila Bakayoko

No.	Pos.	Nation	Player
19	DF	SUI	Ashvin Balaruban
20	MF	KOS	Endrit Morina
21	MF	SUI	Mats Hammerich
24	MF	SUI	Nikolai Maurer
25	FW	FRA	Ayoub Ouhafsa
26	GK	SUI	Benjamin Roth
33	FW	SUI	Ange Dakouri
34	MF	SUI	Burak Alili
39	DF	BEL	Luis Pedro Cavanda
44	GK	SUI	Ysias Hummel
72	DF	SUI	Adam Ouattara
80	MF	SUI	Izer Aliu

== Pre-season and friendlies ==
Win Draw Loss Fixtures

22 June 2022 Friendly	Sion (Switzerland)	1–1	(Switzerland) Neuchâtel Xamax	Basel
18:00 CEST (UTC+2)				Stadium: St. Jakob-Park

28 June 2022 Friendly	Young Boys (Switzerland)	2–1	(Switzerland) Neuchâtel Xamax	Gstaad
16:00 CEST (UTC+2)	Rieder 16'; Touré 74'			Stadium: Sportplatz Schützebode

2 July 2022 Friendly	Servette (Switzerland)	5–1	(Switzerland) Neuchâtel Xamax	Payerne
18:45 CEST (UTC+2)				Stadium: Stade Municipal

11 January 2023 Friendly	Stade Lausanne Ouchy (Switzerland)	2–2	(Switzerland) Neuchâtel Xamax	Lausanne, Switzerland
11:00 CEST (UTC+2)				Stadium: Stade de la Tuilière

14 January 2023 Friendly	Lugano (Switzerland)	3–0	(Switzerland) Neuchâtel Xamax	Lugano, Switzerland
14:00 CET (UTC+1)				Stadium: Cornaredo Stadium

== Competitions ==
=== Overall record ===
Competition	First match	Last match	Starting round	Final position	Record							
Competition	First match	Last match	Starting round	Final position	Pld	W	D	L	GF	GA	GD	Win %
Swiss Challenge League	17 July 2022	27 May 2023	Matchday 1	10th	36	4	12	20	42	65	−23	11.11
Swiss Cup	21 August 2022	16 September 2022	Round 1	Round 2	2	1	0	1	6	3	+3	50.00
Total					38	5	12	21	48	68	−20	13.16

Source: Soccerway

=== Swiss Challenge League ===
==== League table ====
Pos	Team	Pld	W	D	L	GF	GA	GD	Pts	Promotion or qualification
6	Thun	36	12	13	11	62	55	+7	49	
7	Schaffhausen	36	12	8	16	51	59	−8	44	
8	Vaduz	36	7	16	13	54	56	−2	37	Qualification for the Europa Conference League first qualifying round (Note: Vaduz qualified for the Europa Conference League first qualifying round by winning the 2022–23 Liechtenstein Cup.)
9	Bellinzona	36	11	4	21	38	71	−33	37	
10	Xamax (O)	36	4	12	20	42	65	−23	24	Qualification for the relegation play-off

Source: Swiss Challenge League
Rules for classification: 1) Points; 2) Goal difference; 3) Goals scored; 4) Head-to-head goal difference; 5) Away goals scored; 6) Draw.
(O) Play-off winners

==== Results summary ====
Overall								Home						Away					
Pld	W	D	L	GF	GA	GD	Pts	W	D	L	GF	GA	GD	W	D	L	GF	GA	GD
36	4	12	20	42	65	−23	24	3	8	7	24	27	−3	1	4	13	18	38	−20

Source: Swiss Challenge League

==== Results by round ====
Round	1	2	3	4	5	6	7	8	9	10	11	12	13	14	15	16	17	18	19	20	21	22	23	24	25	26	27	28	29	30	31	32	33	34	35	36
Ground	A	H	A	H	H	A	A	H	A	H	A	H	A	H	A	H	H	A	H	A	H	A	A	H	H	A	H	A	H	A	H	A	A	H	A	H
Result	L	L	L	L	L	L	L	D	L	W	L	D	D	D	D	W	D	L	D	L	L	L	W	D	L	D	D	L	L	L	D	L	L	W	D	L
Position																																				

Source: Swiss Challenge League
A = Away; H = Home; W = Win; D = Draw; L = Loss

==== Matches ====
The league fixtures were announced on 17 June 2022.

29 January 2023 19	Neuchâtel Xamax	1–1	Schaffhausen

5 February 2023 20	Thun	1–0	Neuchâtel Xamax

10 February 2023 21	Neuchâtel Xamax	2–3	Lausanne-Sport

17 February 2023 22	Wil	3–2	Neuchâtel Xamax

26 February 2023 23	Vaduz	1–2	Neuchâtel Xamax

3 March 2023 24	Neuchâtel Xamax	0–0	Aarau

12 March 2023 25	Neuchâtel Xamax	1–2	Yverdon-Sport

19 March 2023 26	Bellinzona	1–1	Neuchâtel Xamax

2 April 2023 27	Neuchâtel Xamax	1–1	Stade-Lausanne-Ouchy

7 April 2023 28	Yverdon-Sport	2–0	Neuchâtel Xamax

14 April 2023 29	Neuchâtel Xamax	0–1	Wil

22 April 2023 30	Aarau	5–2	Neuchâtel Xamax

28 April 2023 31	Neuchâtel Xamax	1–1	Thun

5 May 2023 32	Stade-Lausanne-Ouchy	2–0	Neuchâtel Xamax

12 May 2023 33	Lausanne-Sport	2–1	Neuchâtel Xamax

19 May 2023 34	Neuchâtel Xamax	3–0	Bellinzona

23 May 2023 35	Schaffhausen	1–1	Neuchâtel Xamax

27 May 2023 36	Neuchâtel Xamax	1–6	Vaduz

=== Swiss Cup ===
21 August 2022 Round 1	ASI Audax-Friul	1–5	Neuchâtel Xamax	Neuchâtel
16:00 CEST (UTC+2)				Stadium: Pierre-à-Bot

16 September 2022 Round 2	Neuchâtel Xamax	1–2	Thun	Neuchâtel
19:30 CEST (UTC+2)				Stadium: Stade de la Maladière; Attendance: 1,412
