= Sahmkou Camara =

Guinean footballer (born 2003)

Personal information
- Full name: Sahmkou Diaby Camara
- Date of birth: 10 June 2003 (age 23)
- Place of birth: France
- Height: 1.93 m (6 ft 4 in)
- Position: Central defender

Team information
- Current team: Slovan Bratislava (on loan from Slavia Prague)
- Number: 49

Youth career
- –2021: Cavigal Nice Football

Senior career*
Years	Team	Apps	(Gls)
2021–2023	Grasse	31	(1)
2023–2025	Stade Lausanne Ouchy	40	(1)
2025–	Slavia Prague	0	(1)
2025–2026	→ Karviná (loan)	43	(0)
2026–	→ Slovan Bratislava (loan)	0	(0)

International career^{‡}
	Guinea U23	1	(0)
2023–	Guinea	2	(0)
- * Club domestic league appearances and goals as of 22:30, 13 September 2026 (UTC) ‡ National team caps and goals as of 12 December 2025

Sahmkou Camara (born 10 June 2003) is a professional footballer who plays as a centre-back for Slovak First Football League club Slovan Bratislava on loan from Slavia Prague. Born in France, he plays for the Guinea national team.

== Club career ==
Camara is a native of Paris and played in the youth categories of Cavigal Nice.

=== Grasse ===
Camara played 31 league matches in the French fourth division, scoring his only goal on 14 December 2022 against Saint-Priest. He was a regular in the starting lineup.

=== Stade Lausanne Ouchy ===
Camara signed a contract with Stade Lausanne Ouchy in the summer of 2023. He made his debut in the Swiss top flight on 5 August 2023, in a 1–1 draw against Servette. He scored his first goal on 28 September of the same year, when he scored in the 81st minute against Yverdon to equalise the game 1–1. He played a total of 25 games in the Swiss Super League in the 2023–24 season, scoring one goal. However, he was unable to prevent relegation to the second division.

=== Slavia Prague ===
On 25 January 2025, he transferred to Czech side Slavia Prague and was immediately sent on loan to Karviná.

==== Karviná (loan) ====
At the end of January 2025, he was sent on a year-and-a-half long loan to MFK Karviná together with Alexander Bužek. Camara made his debut for Karviná in a 1–1 draw against FK Teplice.

==== Slovan Bratislava (loan) ====
On 2 August 2026, Camara joined Slovak First Football League club Slovan Bratislava on a one-year loan deal without an option to make the transfer permanent.

== International career ==
While playing for Stade Lausanne Ouchy, Camara received his first international call-up in October 2023 for matches against Togo and Guinea-Bissau. He played against Guinea-Bissau in a 1–0 victory.

== Career statistics ==
=== Club ===
As of match played 3 November 2026

Appearances and goals by club, season and competition
Club	Season	League			Cup		Europe		Other		Total	
Club	Season	Division	Apps	Goals	Apps	Goals	Apps	Goals	Apps	Goals	Apps	Goals
Grasse	2021–22	CFA	3	0	—		—		—		3	0
Grasse	2022–23	CFA	28	1	5	0	—		—		33	1
Grasse	Total		31	1	5	0	—		—		36	1
Stade Lausanne Ouchy	2023–24	Swiss Super League	25	1	2	0	—		—		27	1
Stade Lausanne Ouchy	2024–25	Swiss Challenge League	14	0	1	0	—		—		15	0
Stade Lausanne Ouchy	Total		40	1	3	0	—		—		43	1
Slavia Prague	2024–25	Czech First League	0	0	0	0	0	0	—		0	0
Karviná (loan)	2024–25	Czech First League	12	0	—		—		—		12	0
Karviná (loan)	2025–26	Czech First League	31	0	6	1	—		—		37	1
Karviná (loan)	Total		43	0	6	1	—		—		49	1
Slovan Bratislava (loan)	2026–27	Slovak First Football League	1	0	1	0	2 (Note: Appearances in UEFA Champions League)	0	—		4	0
Career total			114	2	15	1	2	0	0	0	131	3

=== International ===
As of match played 14 October 2025

Appearances and goals by national team and year
National team	Year	Apps	Goals
Guinea	2023	1	0
Guinea	2025	1	0
Total		2	0

== Honours ==
Karviná

- Czech Cup: 2025–26
