= Herta Gotthelf =

German journalist and politician (1902–1963)

Herta Gotthelf (6 June 1902 – 13 May 1963) was a German journalist and politician (SPD).

Before 1933 she was editor in chief of the SPD women's magazine Genossin. After 1945 she worked in the Schumacher Office, set up in 1945 by Kurt Ernst Carl Schumacher to recreate the party. Within the party executive, between 1946 and 1956, she can be described as "the main voice of SPD women's policies ... as the women's officer (Frauenbeauftragte)".

== Life ==
Herta Gotthelf was born on June 6, 1902. She grew up in Wrocław, then called Breslau. Recalling her childhood, she later wrote that politics were never discussed in her parents' house, but she herself was already politically engaged even at school. In 1918 she joined the Social Democratic Party ("Sozialdemokratische Partei Deutschlands" / SPD). Before this, she had been active in the youth wing of the anti-war Spartacus League ("Spartakus-Jugend") in which comrades looked forward to a new postwar world without exploitation and war.

In 1921, she was a member of a group of young socialists from Breslau who took part in the SPD party conference at Görlitz. At that conference Gotthelf felt drawn to the left wing of the SPD party, opposing the possibility that the SPD might enter into a coalition with the liberal-centrist People's Party. She embarked on training to work in a bank which she pursued as a career, first in Breslau and later in Cologne. However, she increasingly placed her political interests ahead of her career, and by 1924 she found herself unemployed. She spent a year attending lectures at the Labour Academy in Frankfurt as a "free listener", while supporting herself by working in a perfume factory. Lectures she attended included by the labour lawyer Hugo Sinzheimer and his then assistant, Ernst Fraenkel. In 1925, after attending lectures for a year at the Labour Academy, Gotthelf volunteered to work for the SPD party executive, which was embarking on a recruitment drive in a search for party officers and journalists of the future. This involved moving to Berlin.

After a brief period as an intern working on the SPD newspaper Frauenwelt ("Women's World"), Gotthelf was given a paid job in 1926 as secretary to Marie Juchacz, which included the job of editing the party magazine Genossin ([female] "Comrade" ), a successor publication to Die Gleichheit founded by Clara Zetkin. Working with Marie Juchacz, who was a member of the Reichstag and a senior party member, brought Gotthelf into contact with many of the party luminaries of that time, such as Hildegard Wegscheider, Toni Pfülf and Clara Bohm-Schuch. As a result of her editorship, she also attended international socialist conferences which enabled her to establish political contacts in other European countries.

The political backdrop changed dramatically with the Nazi take-over in January 1933. The new government lost no time in transforming Germany into a one-party post-democratic dictatorship, while Herta Gotthelf set her party political work aside. As a journalist, as a social democrat, and on account of her Jewish ancestry, she was in danger of arrest or worse in the new Germany. At the beginning of 1934, she emigrated to London with her life partner who continued on to the United States while Gotthelf remained in London for more than a decade. She initially supported herself with cleaning work and child care work, and undertook various other jobs, including providing German language lessons, writing articles, and working as the secretary of her fellow exile, the novelist Ernst Toller.

After the outbreak of war in September 1939, Gotthelf gave lecturers to organisations that included the British Labour Party and trades unions. From 1942 she was a member of the exiled SPD committee in London. Between 1941 and 1944 she also belonged to the labour committee of the British group of German trades unionists. She appears to have engaged in extensive networking with members of the British Labour party, including John Hynd who after the war became a government minister with responsibility for the "British portion" of occupied Germany. She also co-founded with other exiles from Germany, Czechoslovakia, the Netherlands, Poland, Italy, France and Norway, a small London based "Women's International" group, which she subsequently described as a piece of "self-evidently socialist solidarity in the middle of bomb-destroyed London", an enterprise on which she would later look back with great satisfaction. Between 1943 and 1946 she was working for the BBC.

Gotthelf returned to Germany early in 1946, settling in what had become since May 1945 the British occupation zone (after May 1949 the German Federal Republic (West Germany)). She was an early participant in the (initially "illegal") Schumacher Office set up in a first-floor office in a surviving building in Hanover by Kurt Schumacher in April 1945 to recreate the SPD. On 9–11 May 1946, at the invitation of Dr. Schumacher, she attended, as a "foreign guest", the first postwar SPD party conference held in Hanover. In July 1946, Gotthelf took charge of the party's national women's secretariat. The next year, at the 1947 party conference held in Nuremberg, she was also given charge over the party's women's newspaper, relaunched in 1947 with the old title "Genossin" ([female] "Comrade" ), and rebranded in 1950 as "Equality. Publication of the working woman" ("Gleichheit. Organ der arbeitenden Frau"). She also made repeated attempts to use the contacts she had made in the British Labour Party during her years of exile to gain practical support from Labour Party comrades for the Social Democratic Party in Germany, and the need to create a less "old-fashioned" approach to female political and economic emancipation both within the party and more generally across the British occupation zone. For the most part British Labour Party contacts, including the responsible government minister, John Hynd, preferred to concentrate their energies on their own domestic problems.

Despite the challenges presented by acute postwar austerity, sources indicate that Herta Gotthilf was successful in mobilising women for the SPD. She arranged mass mailings of circular letters and other practical information sources on issues such as women's employment and education, the creation of information and sexual counselling centres, advice on election campaigning, on consumer co-operatives and trades union issues. One constant theme of Gotthelf's agenda involved promoting reform of the Abortion Law (§218), subsequently a source of contention between the liberal-socialist elements and Christian-conservatives in West Germany.

Gotthelf was instrumental in helping Elisabeth Selbert be named one of the four female delegates to the Parlamentarischer Rat, thereby indirectly helping to ensure that equal rights for women and men became anchored in the new German constitution (Art. 3 -- Equality before the Law -- in the Basic Law). Although there was considerable resistance to this idea, Gotthelf and Selbert organised nationwide protests in support of this article.

At the national level, the SPD remained a party of opposition throughout the 1950s and most of the 1960s. Their particularly disappointing 1957 election result triggered widespread discussion within the party as to its causes, which led to the 1959 Godesberg Program at which the party, for the first time, unambiguously defined its objective as the reform of capitalism rather than the replacement of capitalism. The likely direction of travel was already apparent at the 1958 party conference, held in Stuttgart, at which Herta Gotthelf was one of two members not re-elected to the party executive. The other was Fritz Heine. Gotthelf nevertheless continued as editor of "Gleichheit" and a member of the party's women's committee for the rest of her life.

Herta Gotthelf died at Alf (a village in the hills between Trier and Koblenz) as the result of a stroke.
