= Mathis Holcbecher =

Swiss footballer (born 2001)

Personal information
- Full name: Mathis Jan Holcbecher
- Date of birth: 21 January 2001 (age 25)
- Place of birth: Geneva, Switzerland
- Height: 1.85 m (6 ft 1 in)
- Position: Midfielder

Team information
- Current team: Étoile Carouge
- Number: 21

Youth career
- 2009–2015: Chênois
- 2015: Étoile Carouge
- 2015: Chênois
- 2015–2016: Servete
- 2016: Chênois
- 2016–2020: Servete

Senior career*
Years	Team	Apps	(Gls)
2019–2022	Servette U21	49	(3)
2020–2021	Servette	5	(0)
2023–2024	Zürich U21	56	(4)
2025	Baden	15	(1)
2025–	Étoile Carouge	6	(0)
2026	→ Grand-Saconnex (loan)	10	(0)

International career^{‡}
2016–2017	Switzerland U16	9	(1)
2017	Switzerland U17	1	(0)
2018–2019	Switzerland U18	5	(0)
- * Club domestic league appearances and goals as of 18 September 2026 ‡ National team caps and goals as of 16 May 2019

Mathis Jan Holcbecher (born 21 January 2001) is a Swiss professional footballer who plays as a midfielder for Swiss Challenge League club Étoile Carouge.

== Professional career ==
On 19 February 2019, Holcbecher signed a professional contract with Servette FC. Holcbecher made his professional debut with Servette FC in a 3–1 Swiss Super League loss to FC Lugano on 31 July 2020.
