= Dorian Derbaci =

Swiss footballer

Personal information
- Date of birth: March 25, 2006 (age 20)
- Place of birth: Rudolfstetten-Friedlisberg, Switzerland
- Height: 1.80 m (5 ft 11 in)
- Position: Midfielder

Team information
- Current team: FC Thun
- Number: 21

Youth career
- 2015–2017: FC Mutschellen
- 2017–2018: FC Wohlen
- 2018–2019: Grasshopper
- 2019–2024: FC Aarau

Senior career*
Years	Team	Apps	(Gls)
2024–2026	FC Aarau	53	(7)
2026–	FC Thun	4	(0)

International career^{‡}
2022	Switzerland U16	3	(0)
2022–2023	Switzerland U17	4	(0)
2023–2024	Switzerland U18	6	(1)
2024	Switzerland U19	6	(6)
2025	Switzerland U20	2	(1)
2025	Switzerland U21	1	(0)
- * Club domestic league appearances and goals as of 28 September 2026 ‡ National team caps and goals as of 23:21, 28 July 2026 (UTC)

Dorian Derbaci (born 25 March 2006) is a Swiss footballer who plays as a midfielder for the Swiss Super League club FC Thun.

== Early life and youth career ==
Derbaci is a product of the youth academies of the Swiss clubs FC Mutschellen, FC Wohlen, and Grasshopper, before moving to FC Aarau in 2019 to finish his development. On 2 October 2023, he signed his first professional contract with Aarau until 2026, and was promoted to their senior team in the Swiss Challenge League. On 26 November 2025, he extended his contract with Aarau until 2029. On 12 June 2026, he transferred to Swiss Super League club FC Thun on a contract until 2029, with an option for an additional season.

== International career ==
Derbaci was born in Switzerland to an Albanian father and Swiss mother of American descent. He is a youth international for Switzerland, having played at all youth levels. He was called up to the Switzerland U21s for a set of 2027 UEFA European Under-21 Championship qualification matches in August 2025.
