= Ranko Jakovljević =

Bosnian footballer

Personal information
- Date of birth: 17 November 1966 (age 59)
- Place of birth: Banja Luka, SFR Yugoslavia
- Height: 1.77 m (5 ft 10 in)
- Position: Midfielder

Senior career*
Years	Team	Apps	(Gls)
1985–1989	Borac Banja Luka		
1990–1991	Iskra Bugojno		
1991–1995	FC Raron		
1995–2001	FC Naters		
2002–2004	FC Raron		

Managerial career
- 2010: Aarau
- 2010: Aarau (assistant)
- 2010–2011: Aarau
- 2011: Grasshopper II
- 2017–2018: Wohlen
- 2018–2022: Baden
- 2022–2024: Aarau (talent manager)
- 2024–: Aarau (caretaker)
- * Club domestic league appearances and goals

Ranko Jakovljević (born 17 November 1966) is a Bosnian-Swiss retired football midfielder and manager.

On 25 March 2024, he took over as caretaker manager of FC Aarau in the Swiss Challenge League, following Alex Frei's departure.
