= Lenny Janko =

Swiss footballer (born 2002)

Personal information
- Date of birth: 5 February 2002 (age 24)
- Place of birth: Zürich, Switzerland
- Height: 1.86 m (6 ft 1 in)
- Position: Defender

Youth career
- –2016: Zürich
- 2016–2018: Red Star Zürich
- 2018–2020: Zürich

Senior career*
Years	Team	Apps	(Gls)
2020	Zürich	1	(0)
2020–2024	Zürich U21	86	(4)
2024–2025	Aarau	1	(0)
- * Club domestic league appearances and goals

Lenny Janko (born 5 February 2002) is a Swiss former professional footballer who played as a right-back.

== Club career ==
On 14 June 2024, Janko signed a two-season contract with Aarau.

== Personal life ==
Janko was born in Switzerland to a Gambian father and an Italian mother. He is the brother of fellow professional footballer Saidy Janko.

== Career statistics ==
=== Club ===
As of 20 July 2020.

Club	Season	League			Cup		Continental		Other		Total	
Club	Season	Division	Apps	Goals	Apps	Goals	Apps	Goals	Apps	Goals	Apps	Goals
Zürich	2019–20	Swiss Super League	1	0	0	0	–		0	0	1	0
Career total			1	0	0	0	0	0	0	0	1	0
