= David Acquah =

Ghanaian footballer (born 2001)

Personal information
- Date of birth: 4 April 2001 (age 25)
- Place of birth: Accra, Ghana
- Height: 1.93 m (6 ft 4 in)
- Position: Centre-back

Team information
- Current team: FC Aarau
- Number: 5

Youth career
- 2011–2019: Tudu Mighty Jets Accra
- 2019–2020: Maccabi Haifa

Senior career*
Years	Team	Apps	(Gls)
2020–2023	Maccabi Haifa	2	(0)
2020–2021	→ Hapoel Nof HaGalil (loan)	40	(4)
2022–2023	→ Hapoel Afula (loan)	47	(2)
2024–	FC Aarau	73	(6)
- * Club domestic league appearances and goals as of 28 September 2026

David Acquah (born 4 April 2001) is a Ghanaian professional footballer who plays as a centre-back for Swiss club FC Aarau.

== Early life ==
Acquah was born in Accra, Ghana.

== Career ==
Acquah joined Hapoel Nof HaGalil in 2020. He made his debut on 6 August in a Toto Cup match against Hapoel Acre.

On 6 February 2024, Acquah signed a contract with FC Aarau in Switzerland until June 2026.

== Career statistics ==
=== Club ===
As of 28 September 2026

Appearances and goals by club, season and competition
Club	Season	League			National cup		League cup		Other		Continental		Total	
Club	Season	Division	Apps	Goals	Apps	Goals	Apps	Goals	Apps	Goals	Apps	Goals	Apps	Goals
Maccabi Haifa	2021–22	Israeli Premier League	0	0	0	0	0	0	0	0	2	0	2	0
Maccabi Haifa	2023–24	Israeli Premier League	0	0	0	0	0	0	0	0	0	0	0	0
Maccabi Haifa	Total		0	0	0	0	0	0	0	0	2	0	2	
Hapoel Nof HaGalil (loan)	2020–21	Israeli Liga Leumit	31	4	1	0	4	0	0	0	0	0	36	4
Hapoel Nof HaGalil (loan)	2021–22	Israeli Premier League	9	0	1	0	1	0	0	0	0	0	11	0
Hapoel Nof HaGalil (loan)	Total		40	4	2	0	5	0	0	0	0	0	47	4
Hapoel Afula (loan)	2021–22	Israeli Liga Leumit	15	2	0	0	0	0	0	0	0	0	15	2
Hapoel Afula (loan)	2022–23	Israeli Liga Leumit	32	0	5	0	3	0	0	0	0	0	40	0
Hapoel Afula (loan)	Total		47	2	5	0	3	0	0	0	0	0	55	2
Aarau	2023–24	Swiss Challenge League	4	0	0	0	—		0	0	—		0	0
Aarau	2024–25	Swiss Challenge League	32	3	1	0	—		2 (Note: Appearances in the Swiss Relegation play-off)	0	—		0	0
Aarau	2025–26	Swiss Challenge League	34	3	3	0	—		2	0	—		0	0
Aarau	2026–27	Swiss Challenge League	3	0	0	0	—		0	0	—		0	0
Aarau	Total		73	6	4	0	—		4	0	—		81	6
Career total			160	12	11	0	8	0	0	0	6	0	185	12

=== International ===
Appearances and goals by national team and year
National team	Year	Apps	Goals
Ghana U20	2021	1	0
Total		1	0

== See also ==
- List of Ghanians
