= Paul Stehrenberger =

Swiss footballer (1938–2024)

Personal information
- Date of birth: 14 September 1938
- Date of death: 13 August 2024 (aged 85)
- Position: Sweeper

Senior career*
Years	Team	Apps	(Gls)
1959–1963	FC Luzern		
1963–1964	Grasshopper Club		
1972–1973	FC Wettingen (player-manager)		

International career
1962	Switzerland	1	(0)

Managerial career
- 1967–1970: FC Aarau
- 1972–1973: FC Wettingen
- 1975–1977: FC Young Fellows
- 1977–1982: FC Aarau
- * Club domestic league appearances and goals

Paul Stehrenberger (14 September 1938 – 13 August 2024) was a Swiss player and manager who played as a sweeper. He died on 13 August 2024, at the age of 85.
