= Friedrich Kerr =

Austrian footballer and manager

Fritz Kerr
Personal information
- Full name: Friedrich Kerr
- Date of birth: 2 April 1892
- Place of birth: Leopoldstadt, Vienna, Austria-Hungary
- Date of death: 9 October 1974 (aged 82)
- Place of death: Vienna, Austria
- Position: Defender

Senior career*
Years	Team	Apps	(Gls)
- Wiener AC
- Hakoah Wien

International career
1916–1918	Austria	7	(0)

Managerial career
- 1924–1925: Hasmonea Lemberg
- 1927–1929: Stuttgarter Kickers
- 1930: Estonia
- 1932–1933: Stuttgarter Kickers
- 1933–1934: FC Aarau
- 1934–1935: Strasbourg
- 1935–1936: FC Mulhouse
- 1938–1939: Lausanne Sports
- 1939–1940: FC Aarau
- 1951–1952: Stuttgarter Kickers
- 1952–1954: FC St. Gallen
- 1954–1955: FC Aarau
- 1955–1956: FC Dornbirn
- * Club domestic league appearances and goals

Friedrich "Fritz" Kerr (2 April 1892 – 9 October 1974) was an Austrian footballer and football manager. He played for Wiener AC and Hakoah Wien. He coached Hasmonea Lemberg, Stuttgarter Kickers, Estonia, FC Aarau, RC Strasbourg, FC Mulhouse, Lausanne Sports and FC St. Gallen.
