= Yannick Toure =

Swiss footballer (born 2000)

Personal information
- Full name: Fodé Yannick Toure
- Date of birth: 29 September 2000 (age 26)
- Place of birth: Dakar, Senegal
- Height: 1.86 m (6 ft 1 in)
- Position: Striker

Team information
- Current team: Nafta 1903 (on loan from Osijek)

Youth career
- 2010–2011: SC Burgdorf
- 2011–2018: Young Boys
- 2018–2021: Newcastle United

Senior career*
| Years | Team | Apps | (Gls) |
| 2017 | Young Boys U21 | 14 | (7) |
| 2021–2023 | Young Boys | 1 | (0) |
| 2021–2023 | Young Boys U21 | 12 | (7) |
| 2022 | → Wil (loan) | 17 | (6) |
| 2022–2023 | → Thun (loan) | 9 | (1) |
| 2023–2025 | Aarau | 55 | (16) |
| 2025– | Osijek | 11 | (0) |
| 2026– | → Nafta 1903 (loan) | 0 | (0) |

International career^{‡}
| 2014–2015 | Switzerland U15 | 2 | (2) |
| 2017 | Switzerland U17 | 1 | (2) |
| 2019 | Switzerland U20 | 1 | (0) |
- * Club domestic league appearances and goals as of 15 June 2026 ‡ National team caps and goals as of 6 June 2019

Fodé Yannick Toure (born 29 September 2000) is a footballer who plays as a striker for Slovenian PrvaLiga club Nafta 1903 on loan from Croatian side Osijek. Born in Senegal, he is a Switzerland youth international.

== Career ==
Toure started his career at SC Burgdorf, before moving to the Young Boys academy in 2011. In 2018, he signed for the reserves of English Premier League side Newcastle United. In 2021, Toure signed for Young Boys in Switzerland. On 19 December 2021, he debuted for Young Boys during a 5–0 win over Lugano.

On 12 January 2022, Toure joined Wil on loan until the end of the season.

On 12 July 2022, Toure moved on a season-long loan to Thun. At the end of June 2023, Toure moved to FC Aarau and signed a deal that lasted until June 2025.
