= Steven N'Guessan =

French footballer (born 2000)

Personal information
- Full name: Steven Kenny Toussaint N'Guessan
- Date of birth: 29 July 2000 (age 26)
- Place of birth: France
- Height: 1.97 m (6 ft 6 in)
- Position: Centre-back

Youth career
- Rennes
- –2019: Gazélec Ajaccio

Senior career*
Years	Team	Apps	(Gls)
2018–2022	Gazélec Ajaccio B		
2018	Gazélec Ajaccio	1	(0)
2022–2023	UR La Louvière	22	(2)
2024	Stade Lausanne Ouchy II	2	(0)
2024–2025	Stade Lausanne Ouchy	7	(0)
2025	Krumovgrad	3	(0)
2025	Vevey-Sports	14	(0)
2025–2026	Voluntari	0	(0)
- * Club domestic league appearances and goals as of 26 June 2025

Steven Kenny Toussaint N'Guessan (born 29 July 2000) is a French professional footballer who plays as a centre-back.

== Club career ==
N'Guessan made his professional debut for Gazélec Ajaccio in a 4-1 Ligue 2 loss to FC Sochaux-Montbéliard on 2 February 2018, wherein he assisted his side's only goal. In January 2025, N'Guessan signed a contract with Bulgarian First League club Krumovgrad.
