= Hugo Fargues =

French footballer (born 1992)

Personal information
- Date of birth: 16 April 1992 (age 34)
- Place of birth: France
- Height: 1.77 m (5 ft 10 in)
- Position: Midfielder

Team information
- Current team: FC Champagne Sports
- Number: 10

Youth career
- Grenoble

Senior career*
Years	Team	Apps	(Gls)
2012	Servette	1	(0)
2012–2013	Stade Nyonnais	26	(10)
2013	Servette	5	(0)
2014–2015	Stade Nyonnais	38	(10)
2015–2017	Servette	22	(1)
2017–2018	Stade Nyonnais	43	(20)
2019–2024	Yverdon-Sport	87	(11)
2024–2026	Lausanne Ouchy	62	(3)
2026–	FC Champagne Sports	6	(3)
- * Club domestic league appearances and goals as of 24 September 2026

Hugo Fargues (born 16 April 1992) is a French professional footballer who plays as a midfielder for Swiss 2. Liga Interregional club FC Champagne Sports.

== Early life ==
As a youth player, Fargues joined the youth academy of French side Grenoble.

== Career ==
In 2012, Fargues signed for Swiss side Stade Nyonnais, where he was regarded as one of the club's most important players. In 2014, he returned to Swiss side Stade Nyonnais, where he experienced delayed payments. In 2017, he returned again to Swiss side Stade Nyonnais, where he was regarded as one of the club's most important players. In 2019, he signed for Swiss side Yverdon-Sport, where he was regarded as one of the club's most important players.

== Style of play ==
Fargues mainly operates as an attacking midfielder and is left-footed. He has received comparisons to England international Paul Gascoigne.
