= Michael Heule =

Swiss footballer (born 2001)

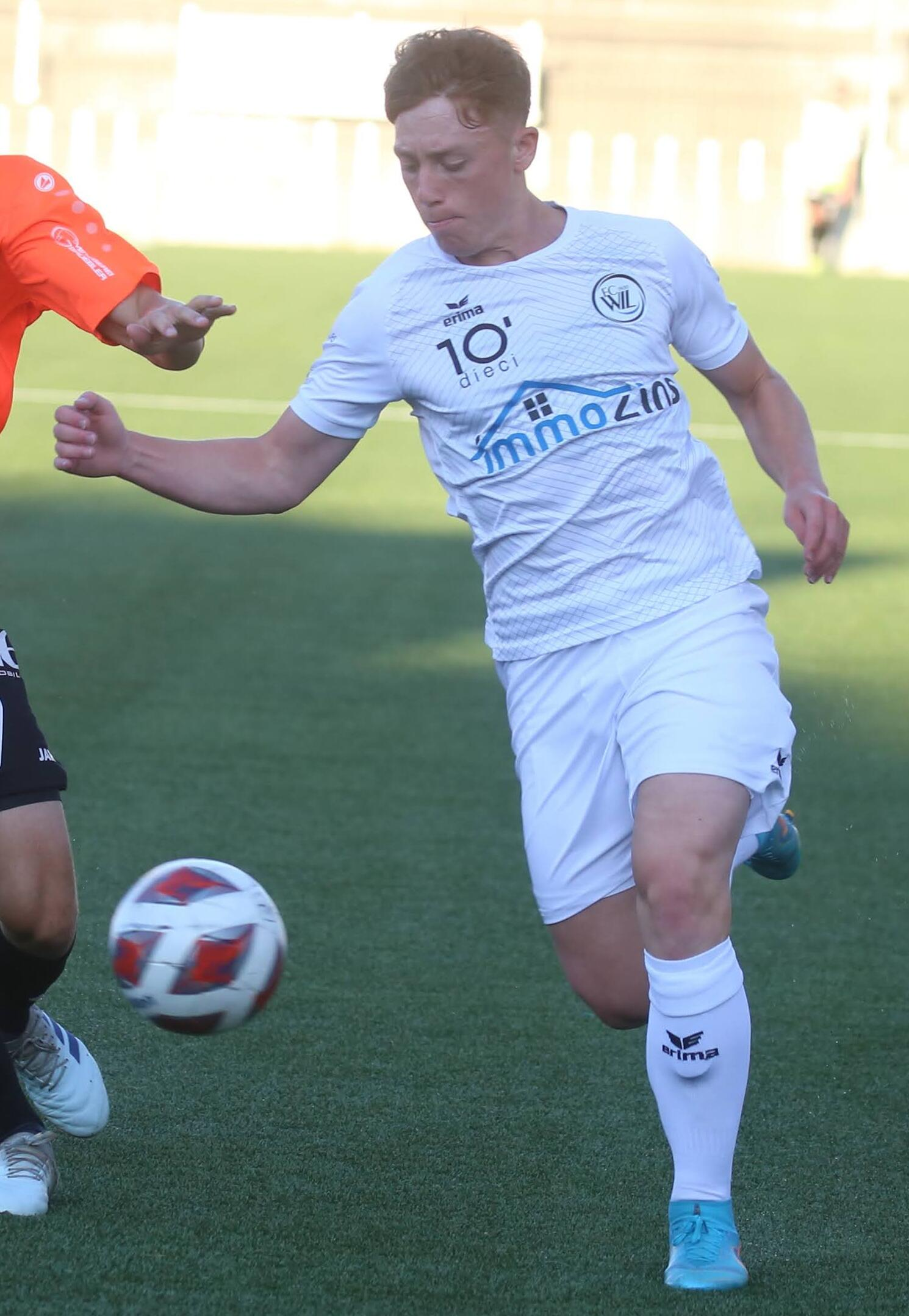
- Heule with Wil in 2022

Personal information
- Date of birth: 27 April 2001 (age 25)
- Place of birth: Altstätten, Switzerland
- Height: 1.72 m (5 ft 8 in)
- Position: Left-back

Team information
- Current team: 1. FC Heidenheim
- Number: 27

Youth career
- 2005–2011: FC Widnau
- 2011–2013: Team Rheintal-Bodensee
- 2013–2019: St. Gallen

Senior career*
Years	Team	Apps	(Gls)
2019–2021	St. Gallen U21	18	(1)
2021	St. Gallen	1	(0)
2021	Wil U21	1	(0)
2021–2023	Wil	57	(0)
2023–2025	Stade Lausanne Ouchy	43	(3)
2025–2026	Thun	34	(2)
2026–	1. FC Heidenheim	4	(0)
- * Club domestic league appearances and goals as of 15:30, 20 September 2026 (UTC)

Michael Heule (born 27 April 2001) is a Swiss professional footballer who plays as a left-back for 2. Bundesliga club 1. FC Heidenheim.

== Career ==
Heule is a product of the youth academies of the Swiss clubs FC Widnau, Team Rheintal-Bodensee and St. Gallen. He made his senior and professional debut with St. Gallen in a 2–1 Swiss Super League win over Servette on 21 May 2021. On 12 April 2021, he transferred to FC Wil on a two-year contract. On 14 June 2023, he moved to Stade Lausanne Ouchy as they were newly promoted to the Super League. He broke his hand four games into the season with SLO, who ended up getting relegated that season. The following season, he was named to the 2024–25 Swiss Challenge League Team of the Season. On 2 July 2025, he transferred to Thun on a three-year contract as they were newly promoted to the Swiss Super League. He helped Thun win their first ever first division title, the 2025–26 Swiss Super League.

Heule moved to 2. Bundesliga club 1. FC Heidenheim in August 2026, signing a contract until 2030. The transfer paid to Thun was reported as €2.5 million.

== Career statistics ==
As of match played 20 September 2026

Appearances and goals by club, season and competition
Club	Season	League			Cup		Europe		Other		Total	
Club	Season	Division	Apps	Goals	Apps	Goals	Apps	Goals	Apps	Goals	Apps	Goals
St. Gallen U21	2019–20	1. Liga Classic	12	0	—		—		—		12	0
St. Gallen U21	2020–21	1. Liga Classic	6	1	—		—		—		6	1
St. Gallen U21	Total		18	1	—		—		—		18	1
St. Gallen	2020–21	Swiss Super League	1	0	0	0	—		—		1	0
Wil U21	2021–22	2. Liga Interregional	1	0	—		—		—		1	0
Wil	2021–22	Swiss Challenge League	23	0	1	0	—		—		24	0
Wil	2022–23	Swiss Challenge League	34	0	3	0	—		—		37	0
Wil	Total		57	0	4	0	—		—		61	0
Stade Lausanne Ouchy	2023–24	Swiss Super League	13	0	1	0	—		—		14	0
Stade Lausanne Ouchy	2024–25	Swiss Challenge League	30	3	2	0	—		—		32	3
Stade Lausanne Ouchy	Total		43	3	3	0	—		—		46	3
Thun	2025–26	Swiss Super League	31	2	1	0	—		—		32	2
Thun	2026–27	Swiss Super League	3	0	0	0	5 (Note: Two appearances in UEFA Champions League, three appearances in UEFA Europa League)	0	—		8	0
Thun	Total		34	2	1	0	5	0	—		40	2
1. FC Heidenheim	2026–27	2. Bundesliga	4	0	0	0	—		—		4	0
Career total			158	6	8	0	5	0	0	0	171	6

== Honours ==
Thun

- Swiss Super League: 2025–26

Individual

- Swiss Challenge League Team of the Season: 2024–25
