= Lucas Pos =

American soccer player (born 1998)

Personal information
- Full name: Lucas Allen Pos
- Date of birth: February 16, 1998 (age 28)
- Place of birth: Irvine, United States
- Height: 1.87 m (6 ft 2 in)
- Position: Defender

Team information
- Current team: Yverdon-Sport
- Number: 25

Senior career*
Years	Team	Apps	(Gls)
2017–2019	Lausanne-Sport	11	(2)
2020–2021	Stade Nyonnais	13	(1)
2021–2025	Stade Lausanne Ouchy	117	(3)
2025–	Yverdon-Sport	37	(3)

International career
2019	United States U23	2	(0)
- * Club domestic league appearances and goals as of September 20, 2026

Lucas Allen Pos (born February 16, 1998) is an American professional soccer player who plays as a defender for Swiss Challenge League club Yverdon-Sport.

== Early life ==
Pos grew up in the United States until adolescence.

== Club career ==
=== Lausanne-Sport ===
Pos started his career with Swiss side Lausanne-Sport, where he scored two goals on his debut against FC Winterthur.

=== Stade Lausanne Ouchy ===
In 2021, Pos signed for Swiss side Stade Lausanne Ouchy, helping the club achieve promotion.

== Style of play ==
Pos mainly operates as a central defender and can operate as a full-back or defensive midfielder and is known for his versatility.

== International career ==
On February 26, 2024, Pos was named to the Canada national soccer team provisional roster for the 2024 Copa América qualifying play-offs against Trinidad and Tobago.
