= Fritz Heine =

German politician and publisher

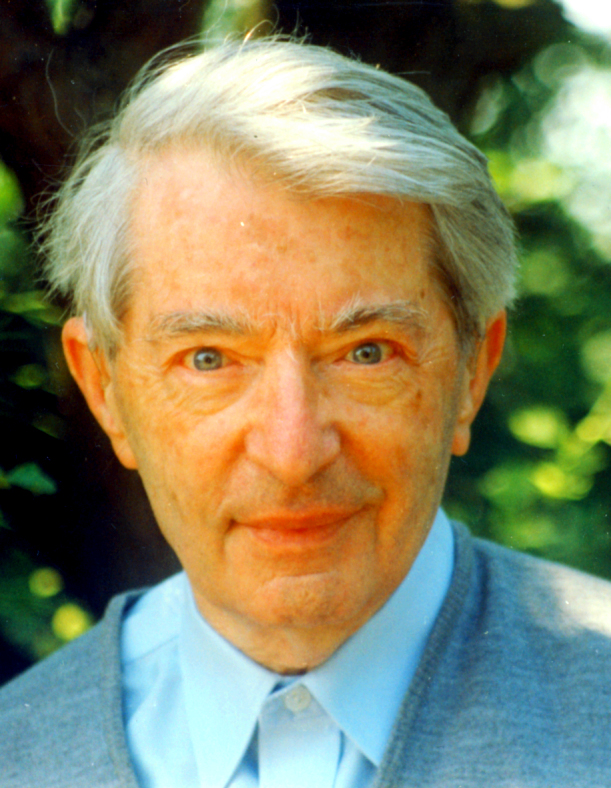
- Heine im 1994
- Born: 6 December 1904; Hanover, Germany
- Died: 5 May 2002 (aged 97); Zülpich, Euskirchen, Germany
- Occupation: Politician
- Political party: SPD
- Spouse: Marianne Schreiber (1915–1997)
- Parent(s): Friedrich Heine (1877–1954); Luise ____ / Heine (1880–1918)

Fritz Heine (German: [fʁɪts ˈhaɪnə]; 6 December 1904 – 5 May 2002) was a German politician (SPD). He also involved himself in political journalism and newspaper publishing.

Most of the twelve Nazi years he spent in political exile, based initially in Prague. Shortly after the fall of France and the establishment of a puppet state (Vichy France) in the southern half of the country he established himself in the "Hotel de Berne" in Marseille where, by the time he was himself forced to flee to Portugal in March 1941, it has been estimated that he rescued "at least 600 people" – refugees from Nazi Germany forced to flee for reasons of race and / or politics – by organising identity papers, visas, tickets and cash.

== Life ==
=== Social democratic childhood ===
Fritz Heine was born in Hanover, his parents' only child. His mother, always delicate, died from Consumption during the First World War when he was just twelve. His father, Friedrich Heine, was an organ builder who had, like his brothers, joined the Social Democratic Party ("Sozialdemokratische Partei Deutschlands" / SPD) in its early days. Socialist political ideas were therefore part of Fritz Heine's childhood. Initially he underwent a conventional Protestant upbringing, but when he was thirteen he rejected Protestantism. His father did not try to prevent this, although much later, looking back, Heine suggested that his act of teenage rebellion must have embarrassed his father whose work, as a builder of organs, necessarily involved churches and churchmen. After his mother died his father remarried: his second wife was a distant cousin who had been widowed on 4 August 1914 when her first husband had poisoned himself in order to avoid having to fight in the war that had been launched a week earlier.

=== Party worker ===
Heine underwent a commercial training and worked between 1923 and 1925 as a sales representative and / or marketing assistant for a printing machine manufacturer. He had already, when aged just 18, joined the SPD in 1922, and in 1925 he volunteered to work in Berlin, an hour by train to the east of Hanover, for the party national executive. By this time he had moved on from his work selling printing machines and was supporting himself as a journalist for a Hanover regional sports-newspaper. After six months as a volunteer trainee with the party he was given a job as a joint-secretary, working for the party treasurer. Early on, however, he was transferred to work as an editorial assistant on Vorwärts ("Onwards" / "Forwards"), the party newspaper.

=== Resisting the Nazis ===
As the political temperature increased during the later 1920s, from 1928 Franz Heine began to create a propaganda and publicity department for the party. Although one or two local party branches were involved informally in this type of activity, there was, prior to 1928, no national department undertaking it. In 1929 he is described as the Technical Head of the Publicity Department ("Technischer Leiter der Werbeabteilung"). Work included monitoring of newspaper coverage, along with producing pamphlets and posters. He was also involved in the early use for party political publicity of sound film. The accelerating growth in support for the populist demagoguery and street violence following the Wall Street crash and the ensuing Great Depression failed to put an end to his political work.

In 1932 Heine was placed on Probation for defamation of a Nazi politician. The political tide continued to flow strongly against moderate politics: in January 1933 the Nazis took power and lost little time in transforming Germany into a one-party dictatorship. Formally the ban on the SPD was implemented only in June 1933, but by that time the authorities had already been implementing a succession of measures to put an end to political activity – other than on behalf of the Nazi Party. After initially working "underground" against the Nazi regime, in May 1933 the Vorwärts ("Onwards" / "Forwards") production team, including Heine was obliged to flee to Prague, still, for historical reasons, till 1945 a multi-cultural city where German was widely spoken. They travelled armed, and each carrying several hundred Marks of party funds in cash, leaving the safe in the party headquarters empty except for worthless inflation-era bank notes.

=== Exile in Prague ===
From his Prague basis Heine was active in resistance work as secretary with the Sopade, the exiled SPD leadership group based in the city between 1933 and 1938. Serving between 1933 and 1936, with particular responsibilities in respect of publication and propaganda matters and on co-ordination of party resistance activity within Germany, he organised couriers, who risked their lives using false identities to maintain links between the Sopade leaders in Prague and party supporters still in Germany. Early on he himself also undertook approximately ten missions between Prague and Germany, using a false passport.

Although the methods used to transport party propaganda material from Prague to Germany became ever more sophisticated, and included the use of microfilms hidden in canisters disguised as toothpaste containers, the Gestapo became ever more adept at identifying and intercepting it, and at cutting off funding to the Prague group. In 1936 the propaganda activities of the Sopade operation in Prague had to be suspended. Working conditions became increasingly difficult. German envoys appeared 29 times at the Foreign Ministry in Prague to deliver increasingly menacing protests against the activities of the exiled SPD and the publication, since 1933 from Prague, of the party newspaper Vorwärts. In Summer 1937 the Czechoslovak president, Edvard Beneš, felt himself forced to give out an ultimatum: either the Sopade group must put an end to all political and publication activity or they would have to leave Czechoslovakia completely. However, in March 1938 a solution appeared when Léon Blum, who was sympathetic to any left-wing political exiles from Nazi Germany, returned to power as Prime Minister of France and offered the Vorwärts team unconditional. Heine received his French entry visa on 20 April 1938 and arrived two days later in Paris to be greeted with the news that back in Germany he had been stripped of his citizenship. Working conditions in Paris were difficult, both because money was desperately short and because hardly anyone there spoke German, but a small print-shop was procured, with difficulty, on the outskirts of the city, and production of Vorwärts resumed, although it is not clear whether, by now, it was circulated beyond the community of German political exiles in France. Meanwhile, during the summer of 1938 Germany progressively annexed the frontier regions around the western half of Czechoslovakia under an arrangement sanctioned in September 1938 by the governments of France and Britain. In 1939 Fritz Heine was co-opted into the leadership team of the Paris-based exiled SPD.

=== Exile in Paris ===
War broke out in September 1939 and a couple of weeks later Otto Wels, leader of the exiled Paris based party, died. The situation became ever more confused. At this stage Heine remained a liberty. Nevertheless, by now even in France political refugees were becoming increasingly closely monitored, required to report to the local prefecture each week. The precise intended purpose of this remained vague, but one effect was to ensure that the authorities had up to date records of where they lived. Heine's name was included on a list held at the Interior Ministry of "Known international anti-fascists". In May 1940 German armies invaded France and, more rapidly than almost anyone in Paris had anticipated, overran the northern half of the country. Heine was now, like hundreds of other political refugees from Nazi Germany, interned. After a few days in the internment camp an announcement was made over the tannoy inviting inmates to volunteer for work as unarmed military assistants. Heine volunteered for work that was thought to involve digging trenches. Later he was set to work building huts and walls for a military encampment ten miles or so outside Paris. However, with the German army advancing rapidly and the French army retreating during May and June 1940, military organisation was in short supply as it affected the volunteer military assistants. Heine and others managed to escape after a few weeks and joined the hundreds of thousands streaming south out of Paris in order to get away from the German armies approaching from the north.

=== Refugee escape organiser in Marseille ===
He settled in Marseille, which was in the so-called Free zone of France, still at least notionally autonomous in 1940, but ruled by the Pétain government which was sympathetic to the Nazi cause as were many, though by no means all, the government officials whom it employed. In Marseille he worked with the journalist Varian Fry, originally from New York City, to organise the Emergency Rescue Committee, which concerned itself with arranging paperwork to facilitate emigration of those at risk from the Nazis. In retrospect the "Emergency Rescue Committee" has come to be celebrated as an organisation for rescuing Jewish persecution victims, and many of those it helped were indeed Jewish, but the defining criterion for those rescued was the extent to which they were at risk from the Nazis. High-profile anti-Nazi journalists and political activists were deemed at great risk even if they were not Jewish, and were helped accordingly. Germans who had been deprived of citizenship – such as Heine himself – were technically stateless and for that reason at particular risk of arrest. It was in any event a matter for the US authorities to determine who should be helped. The French authorities would grudgingly issue exit visas only if applicants were already in possession of entry visas – visitor visas – for the United States, and the Spanish authorities would not permit transit to Portugal (from where refugees, provided their paperwork was in order, might escape by sea) unless they had valid paperwork from both the US and French authorities. Some of the details of Heine's work in Marseille remain unclear. Refugees who had arrived without any passport were issued simply with a green refugee identity document ("titre de voyage"): holders had particular difficulties obtaining further travel documents, and forged documents of varying levels of quality became widely used. One detail which Heine himself later recalled involved a number of "stateless" refugees who were particularly young and fit. Heine was able to work with a former employee of the Lithuanian consulate who had retained the necessary equipment and expertise to produce forged Lithuanian passports, whereby 20 or 30 people were able to cross the Pyrenees on foot and satisfy the authorities that their papers were in order. This arrangement had to be ended after a refugee with a genuine Lithuanian passport was stopped and arrested by Spanish frontier officials because his passport differed significantly from the forged Lithuanian passports to which officials had become accustomed.

In the middle of January 1941 it became known that Heine's name was included on a list provided to the French authorities by the Germans of people who should be handed over to them under the terms of Clause 19 in the armistice which had ended hostilities between the French and German armies back in June 1940. He was then at heightened risk of arrest and set about organising his own escape. Before he left he set in train a plan to smuggle Rudolf Breitscheid and Rudolf Hilferding, two senior and by now elderly party politicians, out of Marseille by hiding them on a ship. However, Breitscheid and Hilferding, despite being in possession of US entry visas organised under the auspices of the "Emergency Rescue Committee", still did not have legitimate identity documents and, according to one version, refused to leave without them. They believed they would be able to leave by other means: both were arrested and later killed by the Nazis.

=== Escape to London ===
Having made his way across Spain Heine stayed for several months with Quakers in Lisbon before he was able to travel to London, where he arrived in June 1941, transported in what he later described as a "convoy of thirty steam ships". In August 1942 he joined what is described as the "Political Intelligence Department", a department of the British intelligence and security services. It is known that in 1943 he and a colleague were sent for three of four months to Algiers where twenty or thirty thousand of German soldiers were being held in prisoner of war camps, each accommodating between 3,000 and 6,000 internees following the surrender, in May 1943, of the Afrika Korps. According to one source he was mandated "to interview German prisoners of war in an attempt to assess the morale of the Wehrmacht and understand the generation of Germans educated in Hitler's schools". According to his own account his slightly more modest brief was to try and identify any anti-Nazi prisoners of war who might be separated out and taken to Britain and enjoy, possibly, better conditions in captivity while being helpful to the allied war objectives. The circumstances did not encourage prisoners to confess to being Nazi opponents, however, since in Algieria they were being accommodated in camps where their own German officers were being used by the British to supervise them and keep them in order. Under these conditions those who admitted to being opposed to Hitler, despite being held as British prisoners of war, were at risk of being tortured, and in a few cases murdered, on the orders of the German Nazi officers mandated to supervise them. In London Heine also willingly accepted an invitation in 1942 to work under the auspices of the BBC in London for a German language radio station, which listeners were intended to believe was operated by German opposition activists from somewhere within Germany. His job was to read the German newspapers and news agency reports which, somehow, the British were able to obtain and provide to him on the morning of their publication. From these he was able to provide recommendations on how the German sources might be incorporated into radio news transmissions in such a way as to serve the propaganda objectives of the allied cause.

By the time he reached London, after eight years as an activist political exile, Heine's anti-Nazi credentials could not be doubted, but relations with the British political establishment were nonetheless not entirely without friction. German anti-Nazis could not accept the assumption that the entire German nation was guilty of Nazi crimes. They disagreed – like many thoughtful British observers – with the industrial scale bombing of German civilians in Hamburg, Dresden and numerous smaller cities: they opposed the idea of dismembering Germany industrially and politically after the Nazi defeat. Following the abrupt switch in military alliances of 1941 there was, furthermore, a marked lack of sympathy in London for the reservations that many German political refugees, including Heine, continued to nurture about Stalin and the exiled German Communists, also a very significant presence in London during the war.

By 1944 it was becoming apparent that Nazi Germany would lose the war, and Heine had already had plenty of opportunity to contemplate what should happen to the country and to the Nazis when that happened. War ended in May 1945. The victorious governments had already agreed among themselves major frontier changes affecting approximately the eastern third of the country, and the division of what remained into military zones of occupation, but there was very little agreement between them as to how the military occupation should be implemented, nor – other than in respect of the Nazi leaders – what should be done with the surviving Germans. Heine's home city had in large part been destroyed by aerial bombing, but what remained of it was part of the British military occupation zone. He and his wife were keen to return home as soon as the war ended and help with the urgent physical and political reconstruction that would clearly need to be undertaken, but this was not a priority for British officialdom and at this stage they were prevented from returning home. However, a general election took place in Britain in July 1945 and a new government came to power under the leadership of Clement Attlee. Richard Crossman, who had invited Heine to work for the BBC in 1942, was now a British Labour Party Member of Parliament and there was cautious reason to believe that the new British government would be more willing to let Heine return to Germany than its predecessor. He was in the end permitted to return on 4 October 1945, together with Erich Ollenhauer and Erwin Schoettle fellow members of the exiled party executive committee. The British even flew them in, on a military plane. However, permission was given to stay in Germany for just a three-day stay, after which they were required to leave again. The purpose of the visit was to attend the Wennigser Conference, remembered subsequently as the first post-war SPD party conference, held just outside Hanover. The conference served as the basis for the party's reconstruction under the direction of the concentration camp survivor Kurt Schumacher in the British, United States and French occupation zones. (The situation in the Soviet occupation zone, where SPD members were already facing pressure from the occupation authorities to agree to a merger with the Communists was more complicated.)

=== British occupation zone ===
In February 1946 Heine was allowed to return permanently to the British occupation zone. The party hierarchy was initially informally established: in practice Erich Ollenhauer became deputy to the party leader, Kurt Schumacher, while Heine was put in charge of party publicity and propaganda, a position in which he was one of the closest political confidants of Schumacher and Ollenhauer. At the party conference held at Hanover on 8–11 May 1946 Heine was elected a member of the national party executive and the leadership relationships were formalised. To the public Fritz Heine, as press chief, was the public face of the SPD. With Germany under occupation, relations with the occupying power were of crucial importance, and Heine, his English language skills honed by his years in London, became the "Contact man" with the United States Central Intelligence Agency (CIA) on behalf both of the SPD and of the German Trade Union Confederation ("Deutscher Gewerkschaftsbund" / DGB). Behind the scenes he was a powerful member of the party leadership team. Hans-Jochen Vogel, looking back many years later, asserted wryly that for many years almost nothing happened in the party if Fritz Heine declared himself opposed to it.

=== West Germany and national elections ===
The Berlin siege of 1948/49 and the accompanying disagreements between western powers and the Soviet Union over the Currency reform of June 1948 forced western governments to recognise the reality of Germany's political (and increasingly social and economic) division: in May 1949 the British, United States and French occupation zones were merged and relaunched as the US-sponsored German Federal Republic (West Germany). After a decade and a half without democratic elections, the first West German general election was held in August 1949. Fritz Heine had been in London for the British general election in July 1945 and was confident that in Germany the SPD would be able to win free and fair national elections. His confidence was repeatedly confounded during the 1950s. The electoral battles were massively uneven for various reasons. The election plans of the SPD, drawn up under the leadership of Kurt Schumacher, had presupposed free elections across Germany, but with the launch of a separate West Germany a couple of months before the general election, the possibility of any free elections that included the Soviet occupation zone (after October 1949 relaunched as the German Democratic Republic) disappeared. Traditionally much of the SPD's strongest support had come from Berlin and various other major industrial cities in central Germany that were now excluded from the West German electoral process. Strongly pro-American, the canny former mayor of Cologne, Konrad Adenauer, was able to form a winning coalition of centrist and moderate right wing factions within and around the new Christian Democratic Union (CDU party). The Americans unambiguously backed the CDU, and much of the West German press was also uncompromisingly mistrustful of the SPD. The West German capital, Bonn, was close to Adenauer's political home base and natural CDU territory. The SPD was hugely outspent by the CDU in the election campaign, according to one source in a ratio of more than 100:1. During the 1950s Adenauer and his respected finance minister Ludwig Erhard steered the country through the years of a so-called "economic miracle" that owed nothing to socialist precepts, and was a stark contrast to Germany's economic experiences – still powerfully alive in the minds of older voters – after the First World War. West Germany's economic growth in the 1950s was powerfully underpinned by millions of refugees "ethnically cleansed" from the former eastern territories of Germany and economic migrants from the Soviet occupation zone / East Germany. Socialism, conflated in plenty of minds with the impact of the Soviet Union's foreign policy, was out of fashion in West Germany, while Fritz Heine was the hapless party election strategist who presided over electoral defeats for the SPD in 1949, 1953 and 1957.

After Schumacher's death in August 1952 the party leadership passed to Erich Ollenhauer. Ollenhauer's political instincts were notably more consensual than Schumacher's. Nevertheless, in West German national elections in 1953 and 1957 the SPD's share of the vote never increased much beyond 30% of the total. The leadership team around Erich Ollenhauer were on the receiving end of intense criticism from party loyalists after the 1957 election defeat. In the immediate term Ollenhauer was to some extent protected from criticism while he remained party leader, and it was his chief electoral strategist, Fritz Heine, who became the most high-profile political casualty. Early in 1958 the party's "best dressed comrade" resigned from his position in the leadership team, and failed to gain re-election to its national executive committee at the party conference held in Stuttgart during May of that year.

=== Party press ===
In June 1958 Heine now became director of "Konzentrations GmbH", a newspaper holding company with a complicated co-operatively based ownership that comprised the bulk of the Social Democratic Party's media empire, at that time a substantial commercial enterprise. In the 1950s the party's daily press had a daily circulation in the region of one and a half million copies – some years more, which was reflected in an annual income of around 140 Million Marks. With a wide palette of regionally based daily newspapers such as the Berlin Telegraf, the Hannoversche Presse and the Dortmund based Westfälische Rundschau, the party's newspaper division employed around 15,000 people.

Heines objective for the party's newspaper "Imperium" was that their newspapers should be "popular, good, social democratic mass-market newspapers" ("populäre, gute, sozialdemokratische Volkszeitung") but as society grew more prosperous sales began to falter. There are suggestions that there was a little too much "top down" political news and slightly too little sports news and news from the street corner. As West Germany became more entrepreneurial, the SPD newspapers did not. Advertisers tended increasingly to favour publications with a less transparently political agenda. Helmut Schmidt would later characterise the decline of the Social Democrat press as self-inflicted: "The newspapers were fundamentally unattractive to any reader who was not a socialist to the bones and who did not see it as a patriotic duty to subscribe to a Social Democratic newspaper". The party's media empire came to the 1950s with a great history that became more burdensome and less inflexible through the 1950s and the 1960s. Fritz Heine cannot be blamed for all the problems he inherited, and it is not clear that anyone else had the vision and ability to steer the business to a more nimble and durable future. But it is apparent that he was in charge during a period of decline from which, conspicuously, it failed to recover. He retired from the top job at "Konzentrations GmbH" in 1974, the year of his seventieth birthday.

== Awards and honours (selection) ==
- 1971 Marie Juchacz Award
- 1986 Righteous Among the Nations
- 1990 Wenzel Jaksch prize
- 2002 Order of Merit of the Federal Republic of Germany with star

== Personal ==
Fritz Heine married Marianne Schreiber on 22 April 1961, by which time they had already been life partners for nearly twenty years, having met as political exiles employed in the "German section of the British Foreign Office" in London and lived together there during the Second World War. The marriage remained childless.
