= Henri Koide =

Swiss footballer (born 2001)

Personal information
- Date of birth: 6 April 2001 (age 25)
- Place of birth: Zürich, Switzerland
- Height: 1.82 m (6 ft 0 in)
- Position: Forward

Team information
- Current team: Aarau
- Number: 17

Youth career
- –2020: FC Zürich

Senior career*
Years	Team	Apps	(Gls)
2019–2023	Zürich U21	35	(12)
2020–2023	Zürich	11	(0)
2021	→ Wil (loan)	10	(1)
2022–2023	→ Neuchâtel Xamax (loan)	27	(8)
2022	→ Neuchâtel Xamax U21 (loan)	2	(1)
2023	Beerschot	3	(0)
2023–	Aarau	90	(17)

International career^{‡}
2018	Switzerland U17	1	(0)
2020	Switzerland U20	1	(0)
- * Club domestic league appearances and goals as of 28 September 2026 ‡ National team caps and goals as of 7 October 2020

Henri Koide (born 6 April 2001) is a Swiss professional footballer who plays as a forward for Aarau.

== Club career ==
Koide signed his first professional contract with FC Zurich in 2020. Koide was loaned to Swiss Challenge League club FC Wil for the second half of the 2020-21 season in January 2021. On 21 January 2022, Koide joined Neuchâtel Xamax on loan until the end of the season. On 8 July 2022, FC Zurich announced that they had extended Koide's contract through summer 2024. Koide's loan with Neuchâtel Xamax was extended until June 2023.

On 31 January 2023, Koide signed a two-and-a-half-year contract with Beerschot in Belgium.

On 7 September 2023, Koide returned to Switzerland and signed a one-year contract with Aarau.

== Personal life ==
Born in Switzerland, Koide is of Ivorian descent.

== Career statistics ==
=== Club ===
As of 18 August 2020.

Club	Season	League			Cup		Continental		Other		Total	
Club	Season	Division	Apps	Goals	Apps	Goals	Apps	Goals	Apps	Goals	Apps	Goals
Zürich U21	2019–20	Swiss Promotion League	12	3	–		–		0	0	12	3
FC Zürich	2019–20	Swiss Super League	9	0	0	0	–		0	0	9	0
Career total			21	3	0	0	0	0	0	0	21	3
