= Étoile Carouge FC =

Swiss football club

- Full name: Étoile Carouge Football Club
- Founded: 1 July 1904; 122 years ago
- Ground: Stade de la Fontenette, Carouge
- Capacity: 3,690
- Chairman: Olivier Doglia
- Manager: Pedro Nogueira
- League: Swiss Challenge League
- 2025–26: 8th of 10
- Website: www.etoile-carouge.ch
Home colours	Away colours

Étoile Carouge FC is a Swiss football team based in Carouge. The club was founded in 1904. As of the 2024–25 season. They play in the Challenge League, the second tier of Swiss football, following their promotion from the 2023–24 Promotion League. The team play their home games at Stade de la Fontenette, which seats up to 3,690 spectators.

== History ==
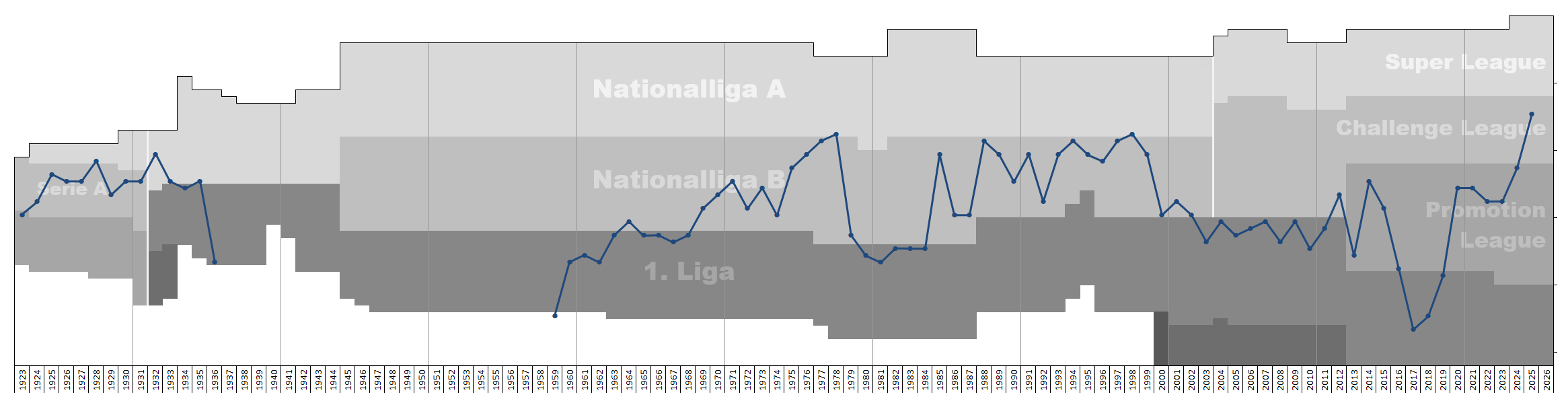
Chart of Etoile Carouge table positions in the Swiss football league system

Founded in 1904 as FC Carouge, the team first played in the lower leagues of the region Geneva. Following the merger with Étoile Sportive, in 1922, the name Étoile Carouge FC appeared. The Stade de la Fontenette was made available to the growing club by the municipality of Carouge as of the 1923-24 season. In 1923 the club achieved promotion to the top tier 1923–24 Swiss Serie A. In June 1926, a second merger took place with Carouge Stade FC, without the club changing its name.

In the 1927–28 Swiss Serie A season they reached the finals for the championship, but failed in the group. Behind champions Grasshopper Club and runners-up Nordstern, they ended the league season in third position. FIve years later, despite suffering relegation in the 1932–33 Nationalliga season, in the following 1933–34 Swiss 1. Liga season Étoile Carouge FC were group champions and promptly achieved immediate re-promotion to the 1934–35 Nationalliga. But the season that followed was so poor, that they again suffered relegation.

Problems then mounted with the accumulation of debts, and the club went bankrupt in 1936. Even though the debt was relatively small, it could not be stemmed by the club's members. According to the then valid regulations, the name Étoile Carouge could not be used for twenty years. It was during this period that the Union Sportive Carouge and the Union Sport (who were close to Catholic circles) developed. The Union Sport became the new 'Carouge Stade, a non-political club. But the club again disappeared into, and played in, the lower regional leagues. Eventually, in 1945, they achieved promotion to the 2. Liga. However, it was not until another 10 years later that the Geneva Football Association accepted the return to the name Étoile Carouge instead of Carouge Stade. In the 1958–59 Étoile Carouge achieved promotion to the 1959–60 Swiss 1. Liga. They established themselves in that division for many years.

Étoile Carouge had survived several seasons in the second tier of Swiss football, the Challenge League, until the 2011–12 season. Due to restructuring of the Swiss Football League, it was announced that the bottom 6 teams of the 10 team division would be relegated to a newly formed division, called 1. Liga Promotion in 2012, rather than the usual two teams being relegated. Étoile Carouge finished four points below safety and were relegated to the 1. Liga Promotion.

On 11 May 2024, Étoile Carouge secured promotion to the Challenge League as of the 2024–25 Challenge League season, following a 2–1 win over Young Boys U-21, and they were confirmed as champions of the 2023–24 Promotion League. They return to the Swiss Football League after twelve years.

== Current squad ==
As of 26 September 2026

Note: Flags indicate national team as defined under FIFA eligibility rules; some limited exceptions apply. Players may hold more than one non-FIFA nationality.

No.	Pos.	Nation	Player
1	GK	GUI	Mussa Diallo
2	DF	POR	Diogo Neves
3	DF	KOS	Florian Hoxha
4	DF	SUI	Ivann Strohbach
5	MF	BOL	Boris Céspedes
6	MF	MAR	Madyen El Jaouhari
7	MF	SUI	Oscar Correia
8	MF	SUI	Ricardo Alves (captain)
10	MF	SUI	Bruno Caslei
14	MF	CIV	Sidiki Camara
15	FW	FRA	Arda Balikci
16	DF	SUI	Emilien Biku
17	MF	SEN	Ousseynou Sene
20	GK	SUI	Benjamin Christin
21	MF	SUI	Mathis Holcbecher

No.	Pos.	Nation	Player
22	DF	CIV	Guilain Zrankeon
23	GK	SUI	Lionel Huwiler (on loan from Luzern)
24	DF	SUI	Maxime Dubosson (on loan from Sion)
25	DF	FRA	Vincent Felder
26	MF	FRA	Samuel Bossiwa
32	DF	FRA	Rayan Kadima
33	DF	ALB	Leart Zuka (on loan from Servette)
42	GK	SUI	Devran Cavus
76	FW	BRA	Itaitinga
77	MF	FRA	Tiago Escorza
78	DF	SUI	Nour Boulkous
80	MF	SUI	Eder Januário
88	MF	FRA	Luc Essiena
99	DF	CMR	Marc Tsoungui

=== Out on loan ===
Note: Flags indicate national team as defined under FIFA eligibility rules; some limited exceptions apply. Players may hold more than one non-FIFA nationality.

No.	Pos.	Nation	Player
—	FW	SUI	Cherif Koroma (at Grand-Saconnex until 30 June 2027)

== Honours ==
- Promotion League
  - Winner (1): 2023–24
