= Dany da Silva =

Swiss-Portuguese footballer (born 1993)

Personal information
- Full name: Dany Roger Bornand da Silva
- Date of birth: 2 March 1993 (age 33)
- Place of birth: Lausanne, Switzerland
- Height: 1.88 m (6 ft 2 in)
- Position: Goalkeeper

Team information
- Current team: Lausanne Ouchy
- Number: 1

Senior career*
Years	Team	Apps	(Gls)
2010–2013	Yverdon Sport	43	(0)
2013–2014	Le Mont	5	(0)
2014–2015	Sion	2	(0)
2014–2015	Sion U21 (res.)	13	(0)
2015–2017	Lausanne-Sport	11	(0)
2015–2017	Team Vaud U21 (res.)	16	(0)
2017–2018	Yverdon Sport	30	(0)
2018–2020	Lausanne-Sport	3	(0)
2018–2020	Team Vaud U21 (res.)	10	(0)
2020–	Lausanne Ouchy	101	(0)
2022	→ Bulle (loan)	10	(0)
- * Club domestic league appearances and goals as of 26 May 2026

Dany Roger Bornand da Silva (born 2 March 1993) is a Swiss professional footballer who plays for Lausanne Ouchy as a goalkeeper.

He also holds Portuguese citizenship.

== Career ==
On 29 November 2014, da Silva made his professional debut with FC Sion in a 2014–15 Swiss Super League match against Grasshoppers.

== Personal life ==
Da Silva is of Portuguese descent.
