= Rayan Kadima =

French footballer (born 1997)

Personal information
- Full name: Rayan Kabanga Kadima Mpata
- Date of birth: 15 December 1997 (age 28)
- Place of birth: Ermont, France
- Height: 1.79 m (5 ft 10 in)
- Position: Centre-back

Team information
- Current team: Étoile Carouge
- Number: 32

Youth career
- Ajaccio

Senior career*
Years	Team	Apps	(Gls)
2016–2018	Ajaccio B	60	(3)
2017–2018	Ajaccio	1	(0)
2018–2019	PAE Chania	2	(1)
2019–2021	Nyon	33	(1)
2021–2026	Lausanne Ouchy	102	(3)
2026–	Étoile Carouge	0	(0)
- * Club domestic league appearances and goals as of 18 September 2026

Rayan Kabanga Kadima Mpata (born 15 December 1997) is a French professional footballer who plays as a centre-back for Swiss Challenge League club Étoile Carouge.

== Professional career ==
Kadima made his professional debut for AC Ajaccio in a 0–0 Ligue 2 draw with Chamois Niortais on 28 July 2017.

On 17 June 2021, he signed with Lausanne Ouchy.

== Personal life ==
Kadima is of Congolese descent.
