= Jérémy Vachoux =

French footballer (born 1994)

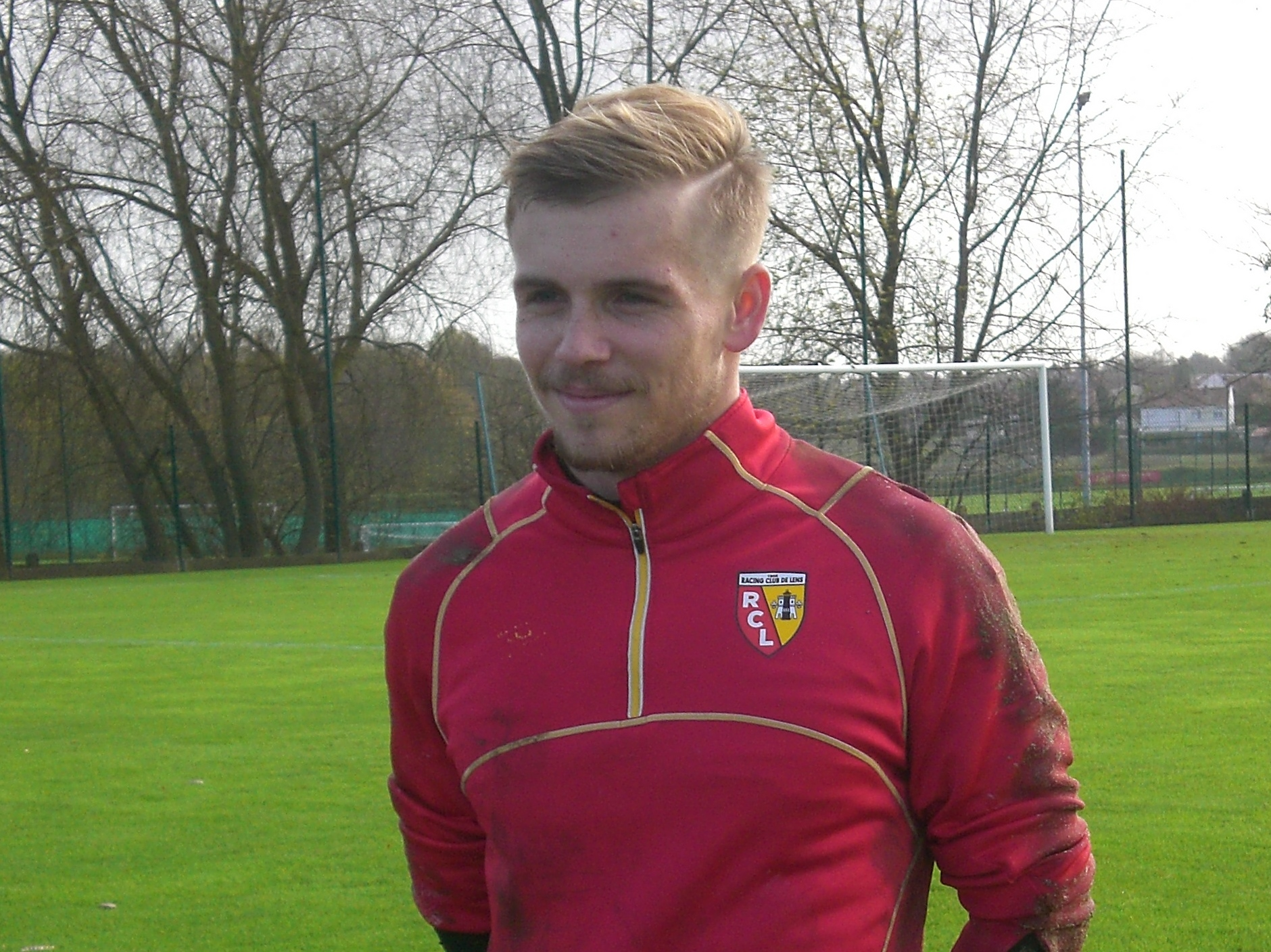

Personal information
- Date of birth: 7 July 1994 (age 32)
- Place of birth: Thonon-les-Bains, France
- Height: 1.83 m (6 ft 0 in)
- Position: Goalkeeper

Team information
- Current team: Bylis
- Number: 74

Senior career*
Years	Team	Apps	(Gls)
2010–2014	Saint-Étienne B	29	(0)
2014–2016	Lens B	24	(0)
2014–2019	Lens	51	(0)
2019–2020	Orléans	10	(0)
2020–2022	Dunkerque	25	(0)
2023	Carabobo	15	(0)
2023–2025	Lausanne Ouchy	41	(0)
2025–	Bylis	18	(0)
- * Club domestic league appearances and goals as of 1 July 2025

Jérémy Vachoux (born 7 July 1994) is a French professional footballer who plays as a goalkeeper for Kategoria Superiore club Bylis. Besides France, he has played in Venezuela.

== Career ==
On 26 January 2019, US Orléans announced that Vachoux would join the club on 1 July 2019. He signed a three-year contract with the club and got shirt number 30.
