= Tiago Escorza =

French footballer (born 1997)

Personal information
- Full name: Tiago-Marti Escorza
- Date of birth: 5 August 1997 (age 29)
- Place of birth: Corbeil-Essonnes, France
- Height: 1.77 m (5 ft 10 in)
- Position: Attacking midfielder

Team information
- Current team: Étoile Carouge
- Number: 77

Youth career
- 2010–2012: INF Clairefontaine
- 2011–2016: Paris Saint-Germain

Senior career*
Years	Team	Apps	(Gls)
2016–2017	Paris FC B	19	(3)
2017–2018	Team Vaud U21	18	(2)
2018–2019	Lausanne-Sport	4	(0)
2019	→ Nyon (loan)	12	(2)
2019–2025	Nyon	137	(23)
2025–	Étoile Carouge	39	(4)
- * Club domestic league appearances and goals as of 30 September 2026

Tiago-Marti Escorza (born 25 August 1997) is a French footballer who plays as an attacking midfielder for Swiss Challenge League club Étoile Carouge.
