= Romain Bayard =

French footballer (born 1993)

Personal information
- Date of birth: 15 October 1993 (age 33)
- Place of birth: Compiègne, France
- Height: 1.69 m (5 ft 7 in)
- Position: Winger

Team information
- Current team: Neuchâtel Xamax
- Number: 8

Senior career*
Years	Team	Apps	(Gls)
2010–2013	Sochaux B	35	(1)
2013–2014	Belfort	6	(0)
2014–2015	Choisy-au-Bac	20	(6)
2015–2016	Dunkerque	27	(9)
2016–2017	Laval	30	(1)
2017–2019	Tours	43	(3)
2019–2021	Pau FC	44	(3)
2021–2025	Lausanne Ouchy	114	(2)
2025–	Neuchâtel Xamax	36	(0)
- * Club domestic league appearances and goals as of 28 September 2026

Romain Bayard (born 15 October 1993) is a French professional footballer who plays as a winger for Swiss club Neuchâtel Xamax.

== Club career ==
On 27 July 2021, he joined Lausanne Ouchy in Switzerland.
