= Elies Mahmoud =

French footballer (born 2001)

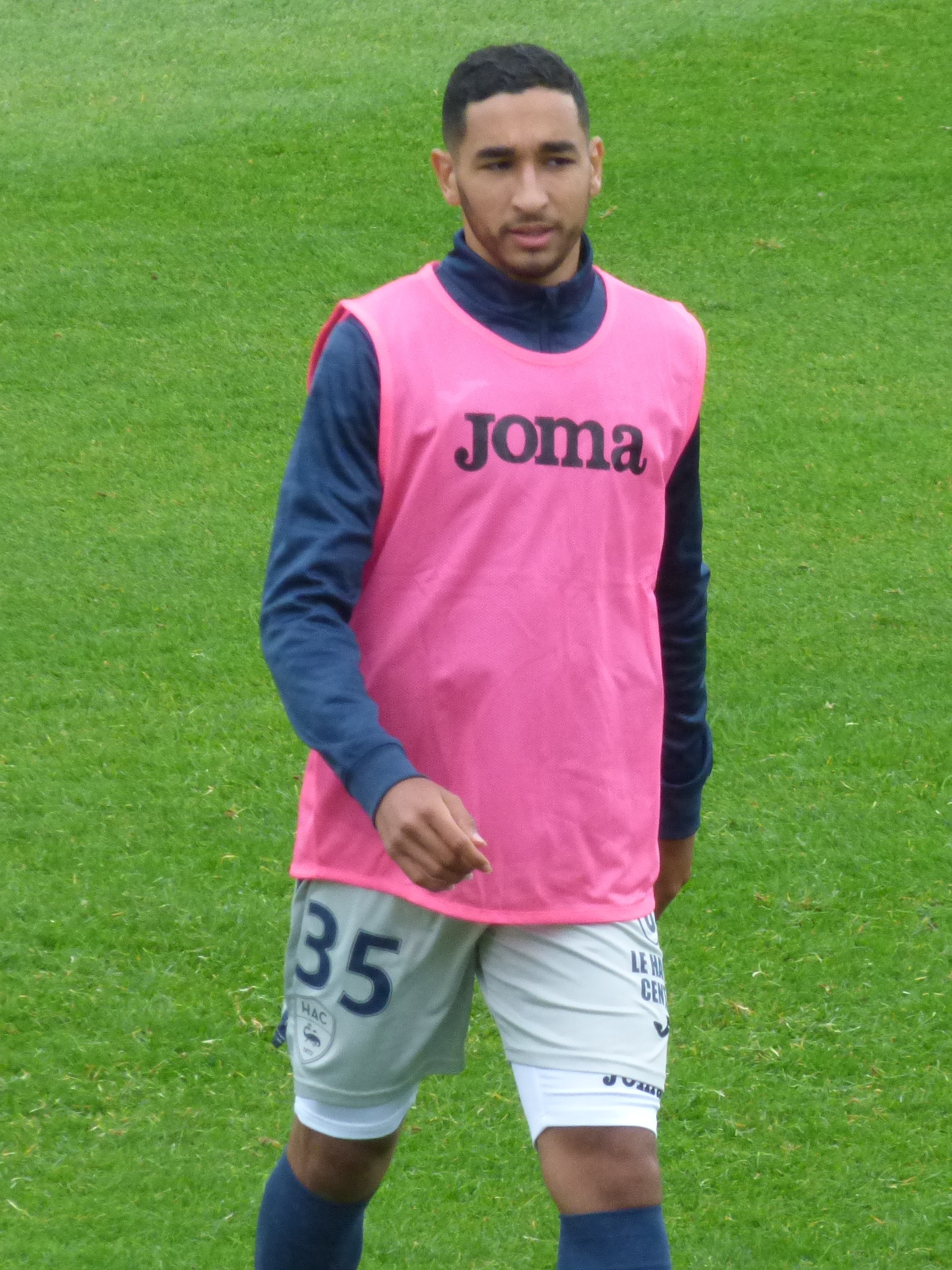
- Mahmoud in 2020

Personal information
- Full name: Elies Mahmoud
- Date of birth: 10 February 2001 (age 25)
- Place of birth: Dreux, France
- Height: 1.76 m (5 ft 9 in)
- Position: Midfielder

Team information
- Current team: Randers
- Number: 11

Youth career
- 2007–2010: Vernouillet
- 2010–2016: FC Drouais
- 2016–2020: Châteauroux

Senior career*
Years	Team	Apps	(Gls)
2019–2020	Châteauroux B	12	(4)
2020–2022	Le Havre B	14	(4)
2020–2023	Le Havre	51	(0)
2023–2025	Stade Lausanne Ouchy	48	(8)
2025–	Randers	44	(6)
- * Club domestic league appearances and goals as of 19 May 2026

Elies Mahmoud (born 10 February 2001) is a French professional footballer who plays as a midfielder for Danish Superliga club Randers.

== Professional career ==
In the summer of 2020, Mahmoud signed with Le Havre. Mahmoud made his professional debut with Le Havre in a 1–0 Ligue 2 win over Nancy on 26 September 2020.

On 11 July 2023, recently-promoted Swiss Super League side Stade Lausanne Ouchy announced the permanent signing of Mahmoud for an undisclosed fee.

On 3 February 2025, on transfer deadline day, it was confirmed that Mahmoud moved to Danish Superliga club Randers FC on a contract until June 2029.

== Personal life ==
Born in France, Mahmoud is of Algerian descent.
