= Linus Obexer =

Swiss footballer (born 1997)

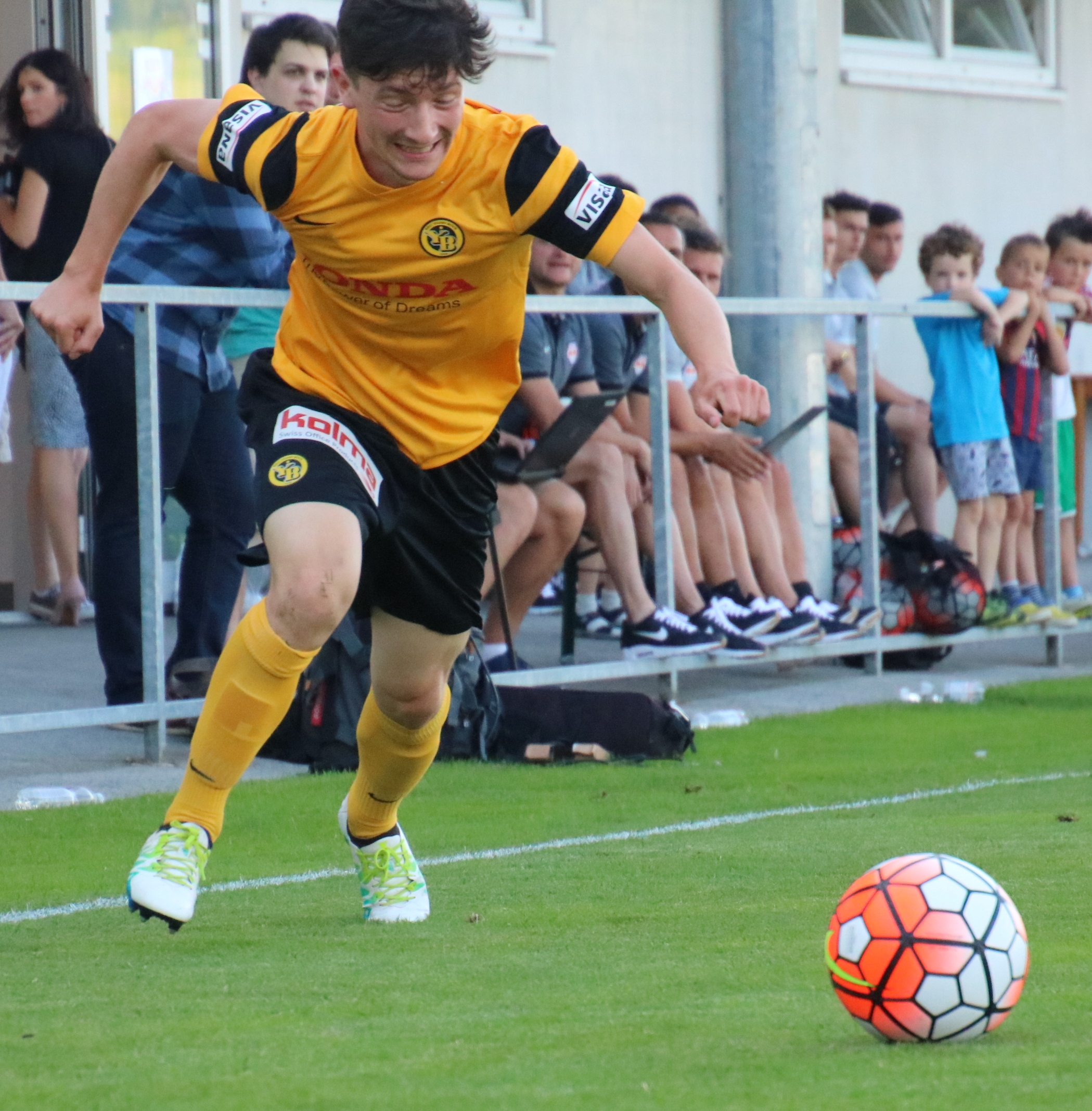

Personal information
- Date of birth: 5 June 1997 (age 29)
- Place of birth: Bern, Switzerland
- Height: 1.85 m (6 ft 1 in)
- Position: Left-back

Team information
- Current team: Aarau
- Number: 27

Youth career
- –2016: Young Boys

Senior career*
Years	Team	Apps	(Gls)
2016–2020	Young Boys	8	(0)
2017–2018	→ Neuchâtel Xamax (loan)	15	(0)
2018–2019	→ Aarau (loan)	33	(0)
2019–2020	→ Lugano (loan)	2	(0)
2020	→ Vaduz (loan)	6	(0)
2021–2022	Vaduz	44	(1)
2022–2024	Lausanne Ouchy	40	(0)
2024–	Aarau	67	(3)

International career
2015	Switzerland U18	4	(0)
2015–2016	Switzerland U19	11	(0)
2016–2018	Switzerland U20	10	(0)
- * Club domestic league appearances and goals as of 28 September 2026

Linus Obexer (born 5 June 1997) is a Swiss professional footballer who plays as a left-back for Aarau in the Swiss Challenge League.

== Club career ==
Obexer is a youth product from Young Boys. He made his Swiss Super League debut on 12 May 2016 against St. Gallen

On 9 October 2020, he joined Vaduz on loan. On 16 December 2020, Vaduz announced that the agreement was reached with Young Boys for a permanent transfer and Obexer signed a contract until 2023.

On 17 June 2024, Obexer returned to Aarau.
