= Izer Aliu (footballer) =

Swiss footballer (born 1999)

Personal information
- Date of birth: 15 November 1999 (age 26)
- Place of birth: Adliswil, Switzerland
- Height: 1.80 m (5 ft 11 in)
- Position: Midfielder

Team information
- Current team: Aarau
- Number: 6

Youth career
- 2007–2008: FC Adliswil
- 2008–2009: Red Star Zürich
- 2009–2018: FC Zürich

Senior career*
Years	Team	Apps	(Gls)
2016–2022	FC Zürich	17	(0)
2020	→ FC Chiasso (loan)	10	(0)
2020–2022	→ SC Kriens (loan)	48	(4)
2022–2024	Neuchâtel Xamax	55	(3)
2024–	Aarau	32	(0)

International career^{‡}
2015–2016	Switzerland U17	10	(1)
2016–2017	Switzerland U18	5	(0)
2017–2018	Switzerland U19	7	(0)
2019	Switzerland U20	3	(0)
- * Club domestic league appearances and goals as of 28 September 2026 ‡ National team caps and goals as of 20:58, 6 October 2020 (UTC)

Izer Aliu (born 15 November 1999) is a Swiss professional footballer who plays as midfielder for Aarau in the Swiss Challenge League.

== Career ==
Aliu joined the FC Zürich youth academy in 2009 signing his first professional contract with the club in 2018. During the 2019–20 season, Aliu was loaned to FC Chiasso, and in September 2020, Aliu was loaned to SC Kriens. On 9 July 2022, Zürich announced that Aliu and the club had agreed to mutual termination of the player's contract. Aliu subsequently joined Neuchâtel Xamax.

On 18 June 2024, Aliu signed a two-year contract with Aarau.

== Personal life ==
Born in Switzerland, Aliu is of Albanian and Macedonian descent.
