= FC Aarau =

Swiss football club

Aarau
- Full name: Fussball-Club Aarau
- Nickname: Die Adler (The Eagles)
- Founded: 1902; 124 years ago
- Ground: Stadion Brügglifeld, Aarau
- Capacity: 9,249
- Chairman: Markus Mahler
- Manager: Brunello Iacopetta
- League: Swiss Challenge League
- 2025–26: Swiss Challenge League, 2nd of 10
- Website: fcaarau.ch
Home colours	Away colours

FC Aarau is a Swiss professional football club based in Aarau. Founded in 1902, the club competes in the Swiss Challenge League, the second tier of Swiss football after being relegated from the Swiss Super League.

== History ==
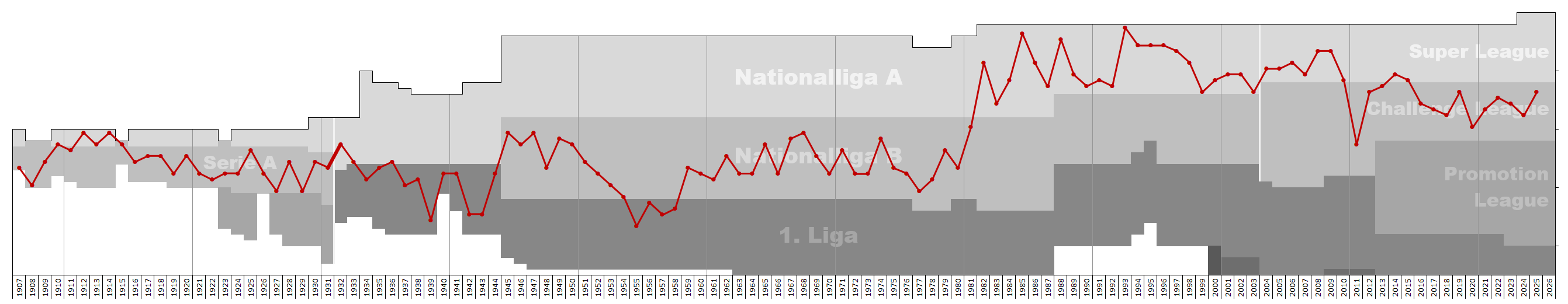
Chart of FC Aarau table positions in the Swiss football league system

FC Aarau was formed on 26 May 1902 by workers from a local brewery. The early days of the club were a success and they won the Swiss championship in 1911–12 and then again in 1913–14. The club spent 25 years, from 1907 to 1933, in the top league but were relegated to the lower league and were unable to return to the top flight for a number of decades. In the 1980–81 season the club were able to return to the top league in the Swiss football pyramid after a 3–1 victory over Vevey-Sports. They have stayed there ever since and in the 1992–93 season they won the Swiss National League A managed by Austrian Rolf Fringer.

The club have also had success in the Swiss Cup finishing as runners up in 1930, 1989. In 1985 Aarau tasted their only victory in the Swiss Cup, coached by Ottmar Hitzfeld.

At the end of 2002 the club was almost in financial ruin. They were saved when the then Club President Michael Hunziker made 15,100 shares available to purchase. This succeeded in staving off the threat of liquidation.

Former manager Urs Schönenberger stood down in 2006 and the role was assumed by his assistant manager Ruedi Zahner. Ruedi was born in Aarau and spent nine years at the club as a player in two separate spells. However his appointment only lasted a few months. During the winter break in the 2006/07 season Zahner was replaced by FC Baden coach Ryszard Komornicki on a temporary basis. However, with relegation looming Gilbert Gress was brought in with three games to go. The move was a success and the club gained 5 points from the remaining games and so escaped relegation by one point. Gilbert Gress decided not to renew his contract with the club and so former Polish international Ryszard Komornicki returned. He has signed a contract until Summer 2010 but was replaced in June 2009 by Jeff Saibene who didn't last long as he was sacked on 12 October after Aarau achieved only 5 points in 12 games.

== Club structure ==
On 7 January 2003, with the club on the brink of financial ruin, a total of 15'100 shares were issued for a total of 1'510'000 Swiss francs. A new holding company, FC Aarau Ltd, was set up to administer the club. FC Aarau Ltd are responsible for the implementation, organization and management of professional football games of the 1st XI and the four centers for performance football in Aarau, Baden, Wohlen, Zofingen for teams in the junior area. Since 2006 the old club FC Aarau 1902 has only been in charge of children's and women's teams.

The current President of FC Aarau AG is local entrepreneur Philipp Bonorand, who has been in charge since 26 May 2020. FC Aarau 1902 is looked after by Marcel Meier and Philipp Bonorand.

== Honours ==
=== Leagues ===
- National League A/Top League
  - Champions: 1911–12, 1913–14, 1992–93
- Swiss Challenge League
  - Champions: 2012–13
  - Promoted: 1980–81

=== Cups ===
- Swiss Cup
  - Champions: 1984–85
  - Runners-up: 1929–30, 1988–89
- Swiss League Cup
  - Champions: 1981–82

== Players ==
=== Current squad ===
As of 25 September 2026

Note: Flags indicate national team as defined under FIFA eligibility rules; some limited exceptions apply. Players may hold more than one non-FIFA nationality.

No.	Pos.	Nation	Player
2	DF	SUI	Marco Thaler
3	DF	SUI	Ramon Guzzo
4	DF	SUI	Binjamin Hasani
5	DF	GHA	David Acquah
6	MF	SUI	Izer Aliu
7	FW	MLI	Mohamed Guindo
9	FW	CRO	Roko Baturina
10	FW	SUI	Shkelqim Vladi
11	FW	SUI	Henri Koide
15	DF	SUI	Serge Müller
16	MF	ITA	Alessandro Bizzarri
17	MF	SUI	Guillaume Furrer
18	FW	GHA	Daniel Afriyie
20	MF	SUI	Kastrijot Ndau

No.	Pos.	Nation	Player
21	DF	SUI	Jasper van der Werff
23	DF	SUI	Eliah Jordan
24	DF	CRO	Tomislav Arković
27	DF	SUI	Linus Obexer
28	MF	SUI	Damjan Čorić
29	DF	SUI	Marcin Dickenmann
30	GK	SUI	Andreas Hirzel
31	DF	FRA	Victor Petit-Viretti
38	GK	SUI	Melvin Frei
42	DF	SUI	Berdan Senyurt
44	MF	SUI	Zidan Tairi
80	MF	FRA	Alexis Beka Beka
93	GK	SUI	Luka Veličković

=== Out on loan ===
Note: Flags indicate national team as defined under FIFA eligibility rules; some limited exceptions apply. Players may hold more than one non-FIFA nationality.

No. / Pos. / Nation / Player; — / DF / SUI / Gian Vogt (at Baden until 30 June 2027)	No. / Pos. / Nation / Player; — / GK / SUI / Simon Zalokar (at Baden until 30 June 2027)

== Stadium ==
Aarau play their home games in Stadion Brügglifeld. The current capacity is 8'000 seats. The away supporters are housed behind one goal, to the right of where the players run out.

The stadium was opened on 12 October 1924 with a friendly game against local side FC Zürich. A new main stand was added in 1982 and in the 1990s the addition of a smaller grandstand and a complete renovation of the standing areas. The stadium is on the municipality of Suhr.

In 2008 the latest proposals were put forward for a new urban development to include a new home for FC Aarau. The Mittelland Arena, in the heart of Central Park in Aarau, should be used to cover 12,500 seats. On 25 September 2005 the proposal for the new development, including the football stadium and a shopping centre, were rejected by the people of Aarau in a referendum. FC Aarau Ltd and the city council are currently working on a new solution for the club as the current stadium is considered to be not good enough for top-flight football. The Swiss Football Association is unhappy at its use in the top flight.

== Supporters ==
FC Aarau supporters are known as a passionate group, despite their relatively small numbers in comparison to other seasons in the Swiss football league system. There are many fan groups but the more popular is known as Szene Aarau.

== Rivalries ==
Despite their close proximity to Zürich, Aarau fans have no dislike of either FC Zürich or Grasshopper Club Zürich. Their rivalries are with FC St. Gallen, FC Luzern and FC Baden. These are due to a number of historical reasons and the rivalry against Baden is also a derby.

== FC Aarau in Europe ==
First Leg Date	Second Leg Date	Competition	Opposition	First Leg	Second Leg	Overall Result
18. September 1985	2 October 1985	Cup Winners Cup (1st round)	FK Crvena Zvezda (Socialist Federal Republic of Yugoslavia)	0:2 (A)	2:2 (H)	2:4
7 September 1988	5 October 1988	UEFA Cup (1st round)	1. FC Lokomotive Leipzig (East Germany)	0:3 (H)	0:4 (A)	0:7
18 August 1993	1 September 1993	Champions League (Qualification)	Omonia Nicosia (Cyprus)	1:2 (A)	2:0 (H)	3:2
15 September 1993	29 September 1993	UEFA Champions League (1st round)	AC Milan (Italy)	0:1 (H)	0:0 (A)	0:1
9 August 1994	23 August 1994	UEFA Cup (Qualification)	NK Mura (Slovenia)	1:0 (H)	1:0 (A)	2:0
13 September 1994	27 September 1994	UEFA Cup (1st round)	CS Marítimo Funchal (Portugal)	0:0 (H)	0:1 (A)	0:1
6 August 1996	20 August 1996	UEFA Cup (Qualification)	FC Lantana Tallinn (Estonia)	4:0 (H)	0:2 (A)	4:2
10. September 1996	24. September 1996	UEFA Cup (1st round)	Brøndby IF (Denmark)	0:5 (A)	0:2 (H)	0:7

== Former coaches ==
- 1933–1934: Fritz Kerr
- 1934–1935: Hammerlindl
- 1934–1935: Josef Stocker
- 1934–1935: Rudolf Kiss
- 1935–1936: Karl Schrenk
- 1936–1938: Bela Volentik
- 1938–1939: A. Sutter
- 1939: Fritz Heine
- 1939–1940: Fritz Kerr
- 1940–1941: Fritz Heine
- 1941–1942: Walter Suter
- 1942–1943: Fritz Heine
- 1943–1946: Franz Sobotka
- 1946–1948: Emil Ludwig
- 1948–1950: Richard Longrin
- 1950–1951: H. Schneeberger
- 1950–1951: Urs Weber
- 1950–1951: Werner Schaer
- 1951–1953: Walter Presch
- 1953: Otto Imhof
- 1953–1954: Hermann Czischek
- 1954–1955: Fritz Kerr
- 1955–1956: Max Isler
- 1956–1958: Armin Scheurer
- 1958–1959: Willy Macho
- 1959–1960: Otto Imhof
- 1960–1962: Horst Schulz
- 1962: Herbert Schauer
- 1962–1965: Alfred "Coppi" Beck
- 1965: Herbert Schauer
- 1965–1967: Ernst Bürgler
- 1967–1970: Paul Stehrenberger
- 1970–1972: Werner Olk
- 1972–1973: Georges Sobotka
- 1973–1975: Srđan Čebinac
- 1975–1977: René Tschui
- 1977–1982: Paul Stehrenberger
- 1982: Paul Stehrenberger and Paul Fischli
- 1982–1984: Zvezdan Čebinac
- 1984–1988: Ottmar Hitzfeld
- 1988–1989: Hubert Kostka
- 1989–1990: Wolfgang Frank
- 1990–1991: Roger Wehrli
- 1991–1992: Alfred Strasser
- 1992–1995: Rolf Fringer
- 07/1995–09/1998: Martin Trümpler
- 09/1998–03/1999: Alfred Strasser
- 03/1999–05/2000: Jochen Dries
- 05/2000–05/2002: Rolf Fringer
- 05/2002–01/2004: Alain Geiger
- 01/2004–08/2004: Martin Rueda
- 08/2004–12/2005: Andy Egli
- 12/2005–05/2006: Alain Geiger
- 05/2006–10/2006: Urs Schönenberger
- 10/2006–01/2007: Ruedi Zahner
- 01/2007–05/2007: Ryszard Komornicki
- 05/2007–06/2007: Gilbert Gress
- 07/2007–06/2009: Ryszard Komornicki
- 06/2009–10/2009: Jeff Saibene
- 10/2009–04/2010: Martin Andermatt
- 04/2010–05/2010: Ranko Jakovljević
- 05/2010–05/2010: Alfred Strasser
- 06/2010–04/2011: Ranko Jakovljević
- 04/2011–05/2014: René Weiler
- 05/2014–03/2015: Sven Christ
- 03/2015–06/2015: Raimondo Ponte
- 07/2015–10/2015: Livio Bordoli
- 10/2015–06/2017: Marco Schällibaum
- 07/2018–07/2020: Patrick Rahmen
- 07/2022–11/2022: Stephan Keller
- 11/2022–05/2023: Boris Smiljanić
- 06/2023–03/2024: Alex Frei
- 03/2024–: Ranko Jakovljević
