= 2026–27 FC Basel season =

Association football season

FC Basel
2026–27 season
- Owner: FCB Holding; David Degen
- Club president: Reto Baumgartner
- Head coach: Stephan Lichtsteiner until 9 September, from then: Luigi Nocentini (ad-interim)
- Ground: St. Jakob-Park
- Swiss Super League: tbd
- Swiss Cup: tbd
Home colours	Away colours	Third colours

The 2026–27 season was FC Basel's 133rd season in their existence and the club's 32nd consecutive season in the top flight of Swiss football since their promotion in the 1993–94 season. The 2026–27 Swiss Super League season starts on 24 July 2026 and will be completed on 30 May 2027. The league will go on winter break after matchday 19 on 20 December 2026 and resume on 16 January 2027. In addition to the Swiss Super League, Basel also participate in this season's edition of the Swiss Cup, entering in the first round. Basel did not qualify for any of the UEFA European competitions.

== Club ==
=== FC Basel Holding AG ===
The FC Basel Holding AG owns 75% of FC Basel 1893 AG and the other 25% is owned by the club FC Basel 1893. The club FC Basel 1893 functions as a base club independent of the holding company and the AG. FC Basel 1893 AG is responsible for the operational business of the club, e.g. the first team, the women's first team, a part of the youth department and the back office are affiliated there. All decisions that affect the club FC Basel 1893 are made within the AG. The FC Basel 1893 AG has following board members: David Degen (president), Andreas Rey (vice-president), Ursula Rey-Krayer and the brothers Jörg und Lukas Duschmalé, plus a delegate of the club FC Basel. Since May 2025 this is the actual club president Reto Baumgartner. The Duschmalé brothers are fifth-generation members of the founding family of F. Hoffmann-La Roche AG.

=== Club management ===
Basel is the only professional club in Switzerland where the position of holding company's president (or an employee of the ownership) and the club's president is not the same person. The club's AGM took place on 18 May 2026. All the existing members of the club's board were re-elected. These being Reto Baumgartner (club president), Carol Etter, Edward Turner, Tobias Adler, Andrea Häner-Roth and Nicole Leuthard, each unanimously without a vote against or an abstention. Club president Reto Baumgartner was again nominated as the club's delegate on the Board of Directors of the Holding AG and was elected to this position with an overwhelming majority.

The board of directors of the basis club FC Basel 1893 are:

Club chairman	(Switzerland) Reto Baumgartner
Director	(Switzerland) Carol Etter
Director	(Switzerland) Edward Turner
Director	(Switzerland) Tobias Adler
Director	(Switzerland) Andrea Häner-Roth
Director	(Switzerland) Nicole Leuthard
Ground (capacity and dimensions)	St. Jakob-Park (37,994) (36,000 for international matches) / (120x80 m)

Source: FCB Official Site

=== First team management ===
On 28 April 2026 FCB announced that Daniel Stucki was standing down from his position as sports director as per 30. Juni 2026. The club also announced that Ruedi Zbinden, who had worked in the club for over 30 years in various positions, would also leave the club and retire.

On 19 May FCB announced that they had appointed Andreas Herrmann as Technical Director, Marko Filipovic as Chief Scout and Dennis Hofmann as Scout. The club announced further on 28 May that Valentin Stocker was to assist them in the newly created position of first team sporting manager.

Head-coach was Stephan Lichtsteiner, whose contract was vaid until summer 2029 continued in this position, together with his assistants Mario Cantaluppi, Simone Grippo, Luigi Nocentini and Archie Ogden. On 9 September the club announced that they were parting ways with Lichtsteiner. Together with Lichtsteiner, Cantaluppi was leaving the club as well. Until a new head-coach was to be appointed, assistant coach Luigi Nocentini would take over in charge of the first team, on an interim basis. On 25 September it was announced that Slavisa Jokanovic had been appinted as new FCB head-coach.

Technical support

Sport director	not occupied
Technical Director	(Germany) Andreas Herrmann
Chief Scout	(Switzerland) (Bosnia and Herzegovina) Marko Filipovic
Scout	(Switzerland) Dennis Hofmann
First team sporting manager	(Switzerland) Valentin Stocker

Source: FCB official site

Coaching staff

Head coach	(Switzerland) Stephan Lichtsteiner until 9 September
Coach (ad-interim)	(Switzerland) Luigi Nocentini from 9 to 25 September
Head coach	(Serbia) Slavisa Jokanovic from 25 September
Assistant coach	(Switzerland) Mario Cantaluppi until 9 September
Assistant coach	(Switzerland) Simone Grippo
Athletics coach	(England) Archie Ogden
Athletics coach	(Switzerland) Roger Thöni
Goalkeeper coach	(Switzerland) Gabriel Wüthrich
Talent manager	(Switzerland) Pascal Bader
Youth Team U-21 coach	(Switzerland) Patrick Baumann
Youth Team U-21 co-coach	(Switzerland) Thomas Mohler
U-21 co-coach and Equipment Manager	(Switzerland) Theodoros Disseris

Source: FCB official site

== Overview ==
=== Off and pre-season ===
Between 26 June and 18 July, FCB will play several friendly matches. Due to the limited capacity of their home venue (Youth Campus Basel in Münchenstein) for safety reasons, all home matches will be played behind closed doors, with the exception of their final exhibition game against Juventus Turin in the St. Jakob-Park.

At the end of the previous season, on 18 May, it was announced that goalkeeper Marwin Hitz would retire from his active playing career. Between the years 2022 and 2026 Hitz played a total of 187 games for Basel. 133 of these games were in the Swiss Super League, 9 in the Swiss Cup, 27 in the UEFA competitions (Champions League, Europa League and Conference League) and 18 were friendly games. Therefore, it came to no big surprise, that the club confirmed the signing of their former number one goalkeeper Jonas Omlin as their new goalkeeper number one on 5 June, because the keeper did not receive playing time with his club Borussia Mönchengladbach, nor with his loan club Bayer Leverkusen. It was also no surprise, that FCB confirmed they had signed new contracts with their U-19 and U-21 goalkeepers Bennett Hoch and Renato Widmer D’Autilia.

On 11 June the club announced that Finn van Breemen was moving to Famalicão in Portugal. On 12 June it was announced that Dominik Schmid transferred to RB Salzburg on a permanent basis. On 29 June it was announced that Bénie Traoré moved to Major League Soccer side New York City FC. On 3 July the club announced that Arlet Junior Zé had transferred to Eintracht Braunschweig. After spending thirteen years in the youth department of the club, FC Basel announced on 7 July that Tim Pfeiffer had transferred to Borussia Mönchengladbach. Further, the club announced that a further former youth player Andrin Hunziker had asked for a move. The contract between FC Basel and their player would have run for another year. However, at his own request, Hunziker transferred to St. Gallen.

The club announced, on 14 August 2026, that Léo Leroy had signed a contract with the English second-division club Preston North End. Further on 1 September, it was announced that that contract with Đorđe Jovanović had been desolved by mutual ageement.

Seven players were loaned out for the season, so that they could gather playing time experience. Emmanuel Essiam was already on loan to FC Winterthur and this loan was to continue until the end of the season. Dion Kacuri was loaned out to Austria Lustenau Moritz Broschinski was loaned to Karlsruhe. FCB loaned Marvin Akahomen for the season to SC Kriens. The club also loaned Marin Šotiček to Hajduk Split until 30 June 2027. Ibrahim Salah was loaned to Royal Antwerp. Albian Ajeti was loaned out to Lugano.

On 17 June it was confirmed that the Italian-Senegalese winger Asane Sow had joined FC Basel, signing in on a four-year contract. The 20-year-old transferred in from the traditional Italian club Pro Vercelli. On 2 July 2026 FCB announced that they had signed Kazeem Olaigbe on loan from Trabzonspor to strengthen their attack. he Belgian-Nigerian winger is joining "Rotblau" on a one-season loan from the Turkish top-flight club Trabzonspor. FCB holds an option to buy. On 7 July the club announced that they had signed in Ludwig Małachowski Thorell from Mjällby AIF. Also on 7 July came the announcement that the Nigerian central defender Asane Sow had signed in from Pro Vercelli.

On 14 July the club then announced that they had signed Coleen Louis from Amiens SC. The club stated that the Frenchman with Guadeloupinian roots has signed a four-year contract with FCB until the summer of 2030. They also stated that, he will wear the number 25 and have his father's name, "Laffuma," on his jersey. Also on July 14 FCB confirmed the signing of Jonas Harder from Fiorentina. The Italian midfielder had also signed a four-year contract with Rotblau until the summer of 2030. FCB announced, on 17 July that the Slovenian striker Žan Celar had signed in from Queens Park Rangers on a three-year contract until summer 2029. On 29 July 2026, FCB presented Aaron Malouda who had signed a four-year contract with them. Aaron is the son of Florent Malouda, who played 80 times for the French national team. The youngster played for the youth academies of Olympique Lyonnais, FC Lyon, Stade Rennais FC, and Lille OSC, before moving to Sabah FK in Azerbaijan September 2025. On 8 September 2026, it was announced that had FCB strengthend its defense by signing Clément Michelin and that the Frenchman had signed a contract with them, running until the summer of 2028.

== Players ==
=== First-team squad ===
The following is the list of the Basel first team squad. It also includes players that were in the squad the day the season started on 26 July 2026, but subsequently left the club after that date.

Note: Flags indicate national team as defined under FIFA eligibility rules; some limited exceptions apply. Players may hold more than one non-FIFA nationality.

No.	Pos.	Nation	Player
1	GK	SUI	Jonas Omlin (vice-captain)
3	DF	SUI	Nicolas Vouilloz
4	DF	SUI	Bećir Omeragić
5	MF	BRA	Metinho
6	DF	JPN	Keigo Tsunemoto
7	FW	NGR	Philip Otele
8	MF	SWE	Ludwig Małachowski Thorell
9	FW	SLO	Žan Celar
10	MF	SUI	Xherdan Shaqiri (captain)
11	FW	BEL	Kazeem Olaigbe
13	GK	SUI	Mirko Salvi
14	MF	SRB	Andrej Bačanin
17	FW	FRA	Aaron Malouda
18	FW	ITA	Asane Sow
21	FW	MAR	Ibrahim Salah (out)

No.	Pos.	Nation	Player
22	MF	FRA	Léo Leroy (out)
22	DF	FRA	Clément Michelin
23	FW	SUI	Albian Ajeti (out)
24	DF	AUT	Flavius Daniliuc (vice-captain)
25	DF	FRA	Coleen Louis
26	MF	GEO	Gabriel Sigua
27	DF	SUI	Kevin Rüegg
29	DF	FRA	Moussa Cissé
37	FW	SUI	Giacomo Koloto
41	FW	SUI	Jean Doucoure (U-21)
42	FW	FRA	Evann Senaya (U-21)
44	MF	ITA	Jonas Harder
46	FW	BRA	Kaio Eduardo
48	GK	SUI	Bennett Hoch
55	DF	NGR	Akpe Victory

=== Players in on loan ===
Note: Flags indicate national team as defined under FIFA eligibility rules; some limited exceptions apply. Players may hold more than one non-FIFA nationality.

No.	Pos.	Nation	Player
11	FW	BEL	Kazeem Olaigbe (on loan from Trabzonspor)

=== Transfers in ===
Note: Flags indicate national team as defined under FIFA eligibility rules; some limited exceptions apply. Players may hold more than one non-FIFA nationality.

No.	Pos.	Nation	Player
1	GK	SUI	Jonas Omlin (from Borussia Mönchengladbach)
8	MF	SWE	Ludwig Małachowski Thorell (from Mjällby AIF)
9	FW	SLO	Žan Celar (from Queens Park Rangers)
17	FW	FRA	Aaron Malouda (from Sabah FK (Azerbaijan))
18	FW	ITA	Asane Sow (from Pro Vercelli)
22	DF	FRA	Clément Michelin (free transfer)
55	DF	NGR	Akpe Victory (from Zalaegerszeg)
25	DF	FRA	Coleen Louis (from Amiens SC)
44	MF	ITA	Jonas Harder (from Fiorentina)

=== Players out on loan ===
Note: Flags indicate national team as defined under FIFA eligibility rules; some limited exceptions apply. Players may hold more than one non-FIFA nationality.

No.	Pos.	Nation	Player
—	MF	GHA	Emmanuel Essiam (loan to FC Winterthur until 30 June 2027)
—	MF	SUI	Dion Kacuri (loan to Austria Lustenau)
—	FW	GER	Moritz Broschinski (loan to Karlsruher until 30 June 2027)
—	DF	SUI	Marvin Akahomen (on loan to Kriens)
—	FW	CRO	Marin Šotiček (at Hajduk Split until 30 June 2027)
—	FW	MAR	Ibrahim Salah (at Royal Antwerp until 30 June 2027)
—	FW	SUI	Albian Ajeti (on loan to Lugano until 30 June 2027)

=== Players out ===
Note: Flags indicate national team as defined under FIFA eligibility rules; some limited exceptions apply. Players may hold more than one non-FIFA nationality.

No.	Pos.	Nation	Player
—	GK	SUI	Marwin Hitz (retired)
—	MF	SUI	Dominik Schmid (to RB Salzburg)
—	FW	CIV	Bénie Traoré
—	DF	SUI	Finn van Breemen (to Famalicão)
—	MF	SUI	Arlet Junior Zé (to Eintracht Braunschweig)
—	GK	GER	Tim Pfeiffer (to Borussia Mönchengladbach)
—	FW	SUI	Andrin Hunziker (to St. Gallen)
—	MF	FRA	Léo Leroy (to Preston North End)
—	FW	SRB	Đorđe Jovanović (contract desolved)

== Results and fixtures ==
Kickoff times are in CET.

=== Legend ===
Win Draw Loss Postponed

=== Friendly matches ===
==== Pre-season ====
26 June 2026 Exhibition game	Rapperswil-Jona	0–3	Basel	Stadion Grünfeld, Rapperswil-Jona
18:00		FCB summary	17' (0:1) Hunziker; 72' (0:2) Ajeti; 89' (0:3) Akahomen	Attendance: 1,210; Referee: (Switzerland) Arber Smajli
Note: FCB without Kaio Eduardo (recovering), Broschinski, Sigua, Rexhaj (niggling injury), Traoré (granted leave for negotiations), Hoch, and Pfeiffer (not in the squad).

28 June 2026 Exhibition game	Basel	P–P	YF Juventus	Youth Campus Basel, Münchenstein
13:00
Note: The friendly match scheduled for Sunday, 28 June 2026, between FC Basel 1893 and SC YF Juventus did not take place. The cancellation was due to a slight adjustment to the pre-season training schedule.

4 July 2026 Exhibition game	Basel	P–P	Aarau	Youth Campus Basel, Münchenstein
13:00
Note: The friendly match scheduled for Saturday, 4 July 2026, at 13:00 between FC Basel 1893 and FC Aarau did not take place. The cancellation is at the request of FC Aarau due to several players being unavailable due to injury and illness.

8 July 2026 Exhibition game	Basel	0–3	Yverdon	Youth Campus Basel, Münchenstein
14:00		FCB summary	43' (pen. 0:1) Fazliu; 78' (0:2) Ntelo; 81' (0:3) Ntelo	Attendance: 0 Referee: (Croatia) Marijan Drmic (Tuggen)
Note: Due to capacity and safety reasons played behind closed doors.

11 July 2026 Exhibition game	Basel	2–2	Winterthur	Youth Campus Basel, Münchenstein
13:00	Otele 61' (1:1); Doucoure 89' (2:2)	FCB summary	59' (0:1) Rohner; 85' (1:2) Buess	Attendance: 0 Referee: (Switzerland) Désirée Blanco (-Grundbacher)
Note: Due to capacity and safety reasons played behind closed doors.

18 July 2026 Exhibition game	Basel	0–0	Juventus Turin	St. Jakob-Park, Basel
15:30	Otele (penalty missed) 58′ Salvi (red card) 84'	FCB summary	(yellow card) 38' Cambiaso; (yellow card) 90+3' João Mário	Attendance: 24,206; Referee: (Switzerland) Lukas Fähndrich
Note: FCB without Kaio Eduardo (recovering from injury), Sigua (injured), Hoch, Soticek, and Jovanovic (not in the squad). 58th minute, the penalty from Otele was saved by Perin.

=== Swiss Super League ===
The 2026–27 Super League season was the 130th season of top-tier competitive football in Switzerland. The Swiss Football League (SFL) drew and published the fixtures of the first 22 rounds on 16 June 2026. The further fixtures and dates were to be drawn at a later date.

==== First and second round ====
25 July 2026 Round 1	Servette	0–1	Basel	Stade de Genève, Geneva
18:00		FCB summary	78' (pen.) Celar	Attendance: 8,351; Referee: (Switzerland) Urs Schnyder
Note: Servette were without Frick, Gertmonas, and Kadile (all injured). Basel were without Eduardo (injured), Omlin (was ill), Rüegg, Senaya, Sigua, Harder, Soticek, Koloto, and Jovanovic (all not in the squad). Fair game, no cautions were issued.

1 August 2026 Round 2	Basel	0–1	Lausanne-Sport	St. Jakob-Park, Basel
18:00	Victory (yellow card) 90+3'; Metinho (yellow card) 90+3'	FCB summary	(yellow card) 56' Poaty; (yellow card) 57' Custodio; 90+1' Mollet; (yellow card) 90+1' Mollet; (yellow card) 90+3' Sow; (yellow card) 90+3' Bergvall	Attendance: 24,145; Referee: (Switzerland) Sven Wolfensberger
Note: FCB without Kaio Eduardo (injured), Sigua and Louis (both carrying knocks), Bacanin, Jovanovic, Koloto (U21), Salah, and Senaya. Lausanne without Beloko and NDiaye (both injured).

8 August 2026 Round 3	Basel	4–2	Thun	St. Jakob-Park, Basel
18:00	Sow 4' (1:0); Sow 31' (2:0); Celar 53' (3:0); Shaqiri 75' (4:1); Leroy (yellow card) 88'	FCB summary	(yellow card) 38' Reichmuth; (yellow card) 61' Fehr; 73' (3:1) Stewart; 90+1' (4:2) Labeau; (yellow card) 90+2' Roth	Attendance: 24,316; Referee: (Switzerland) Luca Cibelli
Note: FCB without Sigua, Omlin, Kaio Eduardo, Louis (all injured), Malouda, Jovanovic, Rüegg, Senaya (all not selected). Thun without: Kait, Montolio (both injured), Bürki (suspended), Seiler (not selected).

22 August 2026 Round 4	Zürich	1–2	Basel	Letzigrund, Zürich
20:30	Walker (yellow card) 3'; Kény 8' (pen. 1:0); Emmanuel (yellow card) 45'; Kamberi (yellow card) 74'; Hack (yellow card) 84'	FCB summary	(yellow card) 7' Victory; (yellow card) 19' Thorell; (yellow card) 26' Omeragić; 62' (1:1) Olaigbe; (yellow card) 76' Sow; (yellow card) 81' Cissé; 85' (pen. 1:2) Celar; (yellow card) 90+5' Olaigbe; (yellow card) 90+6' Celar	Attendance: 18,154; Referee: (Switzerland) Anojen Kanagasingam
Note: FCZ without Melvin Hodza, Huber, and Morozov (all injured). FCB without Kaio Eduardo, Hoch, Louis, Omlin, Sigua, and Otele (all injured), and Ajeti and Jovanovic (both not in the squad). 45th minute: Krasniqi cleared a header from Omeragic against his own crossbar. 76th minute: Header by Sow hit the post.

29 August 2026 Round 5	Young Boys	3–3	Basel	Stadion Wankdorf, Bern
20:30	Monteiro 7'; Essende 14'; Fassnacht (yellow card) 45'; Sanches 45+1'; Monteiro (yellow card) 76'; Blum (yellow card) 89'	FCB summary	32' Olaigbe; 37' Sow; (yellow card) 39' Victory; (yellow card) 44' Metinho; 71' Victory	Attendance: 29,220; Referee: (Switzerland) Sandro Schärer
Note: YB without Andrews, Conte, Imeri, Jost, Kabeya, Mambwa, Marzino, Zesiger. FCB without: Ajeti, Jovanovic, Doucoure, Kakor (all not in squad), Louis, Sigua, Omlin, Kaio Eduardo (all injured). 43rd minute yellow card for FCB coach Lichtsteiner (complaining).

3 September 2026 Round 6	Basel	1–2	Sion	St. Jakob-Park, Basel
20:30	Celar 40' (1:0); Cissé (yellow card) 61' (yellow-red card) 62'; Thorell (yellow card) 79'	FCB summary	(yellow card) 45' Kabacalman; 76' (1:1) Boteli; 79' (1:2) Boteli; (yellow card) 85' Sow	Attendance: 21,243; Referee: (Switzerland) Nico Gianforte
Note: FCB without Omlin, Kaio Eduardo, Louis, Sigua, Hoch (all injured). Sion without Chouaref, Hajrizi (both injured). Goal from Celar (45th +1) disallowed after VAR intervention.

6 September 2026 Round 7	Basel	1–3	Lugano	St. Jakob-Park, Basel
16:30	Metinho 47' (1:0); Shaqiri (yellow card) 70'	FCB summary	(yellow card) 2' Moncada; 59' (1:1) Cimignani; (yellow card) 59' Cimignani; 61' (1:2) Bislimi; (yellow card) 72' Grgić; 81' (1:3) Kendouci; (yellow card) 85' Bislimi: (yellow card) 87' Pihlström	Attendance: 28,415; Referee: (Switzerland) Désirée Blanco
Note: Last match as referee for Désirée Blanco, because afterwards she retired, due to health reasons. FCB without Kaio Eduardo, Louis, Sigua, and Hoch (all injured); Cissé (suspended). Lugano without Alioski, Behrens, Cassano, Marques, and Zanotti (all injured). 38th minute: a shot from Dos Santos hit the post. 77th minute: a shot from Otele hit the post.

13 September 2026 Round 8	Luzern	2–4	Basel	Swissporarena, Luzern
16:30	Kabwit 4' (1:0); Freimann (yellow card) 52'; Villiger 84' (2:4)	FCB summary	42' (1:1) Celar; 56' (1:2), (yellow card) 58' Otele; 56' (1:3), 66' (1:4), (yellow card) 57' Shaqiri	Referee: (Switzerland) Urs Schnyder

20 September 2026 Round 9	Basel	1–3	St. Gallen	St. Jakob-Park, Basel
16:30	Michelin (yellow card) 21'; Harder (yellow card) 31'; Celar 43' (pen. 1:1); Olaigbe (yellow card) 75'; Shaqiri (yellow card) 90+2'	FCB summary	9' (0:1), (yellow card) 26' Baldé; 65' (1:2) Witzig; 85' (1:3) Boukhalfa	Attendance: 27,872; Referee: (Switzerland) Sven Wolfensberger

11 October 2026 Round 10	Vaduz	3–0	Basel	Rheinpark Stadion, Vaduz
16:30	Monsberger 26' (1:0); Monsberger (36}); Simani (yellow card) 48'; Cabrera (yellow card) 50'; Schwizer (yellow card) 52'; Dalipi 68' (3:0)	FCB summary	(yellow card) 51' Olaigbe	Attendance: 5,405; Referee: (Switzerland) Alessandro Dudic
Note: Vaduz without Akhalaia, Eberhard, Neelakandan, Öhri, Seiler, and Sorgic (injured). FCB without Bacanin, Hoch, Kaio Eduardo, Louis, Sigua, and Sow (injured), as well as Renato and Kakor (not in the squad). 19th minute: Omlin deflects a shot by Cabrera onto the post.

25 October 2026 Round 11	Basel	0–0	Grasshopper Club	St. Jakob-Park, Basel
16:30	Daniliuc (yellow card) 43'; Olaigbe (yellow card) 67'	FCB summary	(yellow card) 71' Goudmijn	Attendance: 23,100; Referee: (Switzerland) Sandro Schärer (Buttikon)
Note: FCB without Hoch, Kaio Eduardo, Malouda, Sigua, Sow (all injured). GC without Bengondo, Creti, Diaby, Marques, Meyer (all injured); Plange (sick). 76th minute, GC goalkeeper Marvin Hübel substituted out injured. 84th minute GC defender Simone Stroscio substituted out injured.

1 November 2026 Round 12	Lugano	2–1	Basel	AIL Arena, Lugano
16:30	Dos Santos 10' (1:0); Bislimi (yellow card) 16'; Cimignani 26' (2:0); Zanotti (yellow card); Mai (yellow card) 90+2'	FCB summary	(yellow card) 16' Otele; (yellow card) 44' Omeragić; (yellow card) 45' Shaqiri; 57' (2:1) Otele; (yellow card) 76' Metinho	Attendance: 8,153; Referee: (Switzerland) Johannes von Mandach
Note: Lugano without Steffen (injured), Carbone, Cassano and Marques (not in the squad). FCB without Salvi, Hoch, Malouda and Doucoure (injured), as well as Kaio Eduardo and Sigua (in recovery/training).

8 November 2026 Round 13	Thun	3–3	Basel	Stockhorn Arena, Thun
16:30	Labeau 16' (1:2); Reichmuth 39' (2:2) (Rüegg) 59' (og 3:3); Bamert (yellow card) 90+6'	FCB summary	1' (0:1) Celar; 12' (0:2) Otele; (yellow card) 33'; 55' (pen. 2:3) Celar; (yellow card) 81' Louis	Attendance: 8,767; Referee: (Switzerland) Lukas Fähndrich
Note: Thun without Montolio, Saiz and Seiler (all injured). FCB without Malouda, Hoch, Sigua and Kaio Eduardo (all injured), as well as Shaqiri (suspended). 21st minute, Thun mid-fielder Moncada substituted out injured. 51st minute, Thun defender Bichsel substituted out injured.

22 November 2026 Round 14	Basel	v	Luzern	St. Jakob-Park, Basel
16:30		[ FCB summary]

28 November 2026 Round 15	Grasshopper Club	v	Basel	Letzigrund, Zürich
18:00		[ FCB summary]

6 December 2026 Round 16	Basel	v	Servette	St. Jakob-Park, Basel
14:00		[ FCB summary]

13 December 2026 Round 17	Sion	v	Basel	Stade Tourbillon, Sion
16:30		[ FCB summary]

19 December 2026 Round 18	Basel	v	Zürich	St. Jakob-Park, Basel
19:30		[ FCB summary]

16 or 17 January 2027 Round 19	Basel	v	Vaduz	St. Jakob-Park, Basel
tbd		[ FCB summary]

23 or 24 January 2027 Round 20	Lausanne-Sport	v	Basel	Stade de la Tuilière, Lausanne
tbd		[ FCB summary]

30 or31 January 2027 Round 21	Basel	v	Young Boys	St. Jakob-Park, Basel
tbd		[ FCB summary]

6 or 7 February 2026 Round 22	St. Gallen	v	Basel	Kybunpark, St. Gallen
tbd		[ FCB summary]

==== Third round ====
The fixtures and dates for the third round will be announced in December 2026.

==== League table ====
Pos	Team	Pld	W	D	L	GF	GA	GD	Pts	Qualification or relegation (Note: Teams play each other three times (33 matches), before the league is split into two groups (the top six and the bottom six).)
5	Zürich	13	6	3	4	25	26	−1	21	
6	Servette	13	5	2	6	17	16	+1	17	
7	Basel	13	4	3	6	21	25	−4	15	
8	Thun	13	4	2	7	27	37	−10	14	
9	Luzern	13	3	4	6	21	28	−7	13	

Updated to match(es) played on 8 November 2026. Source: Brack Super League - Tabelle
Rules for classification: 1) Points; 2) Goal difference; 3) Goals scored; 4) Head-to-head goal difference; 5) Head-to-head goals scored 6) Away goals scored; 7) Draw.

=== Swiss Cup ===
The fixtues and dates of the first round were drawn in June 2026.

15 August 2026 Round 1	FC Courtételle	1–6	Basel	Centre Sportif, Courtételle
16:00	Rossé 70'	FCB summary	4' Olaigbe; 7' Bačanin; 17' Sow; 23' (pen.) Celar; 46' Małachowski; 66' Koloto	Attendance: 4,955; Referee: Johannes von Mandach

16 October 2026 Round 2	FC Stade Nyonnais	0–3	Basel	Stade de Colovray, Nyon
20:15	Akichi (yellow card) 20'; Figueiredo (yellow card) 80'	summary	5' (0:1) Victory; Cissé (yellow card) 13'; 16' (0:2) Celar; (yellow card) 37' Koloto; (yellow card) 45+1' Daniliuc; (yellow card) 81' Celar; 86' (0:3) Malouda	Attendance: 2,093; Referee: Luca Cibelli
Note: Nyon without Alili, Brandy, and Diallo (all injured). FCB without Hoch and Sigua (both injured), and Sow (in recovery/rehabilitation). 54th minute: a shot from Nyon mid-fielder Miguel hit the post.

12 December 2026 Round 3	Young Boys	v	Basel	Stadion Wankdorf, Bern
20:30

== See also ==
- History of FC Basel
- List of FC Basel players
- List of FC Basel seasons

== Sources ==
- FCB squad 2026–27 at fcb-archiv.ch
- Switzerland 2026–27 at RSSSF
