= Asane Sow =

Italian footballer (born 2006)

Personal information
- Date of birth: 2 May 2006 (age 20)
- Place of birth: Seriate, Italy
- Height: 1.70 m (5 ft 7 in)
- Position: Winger

Team information
- Current team: Basel
- Number: 18

Youth career
- Salus
- Lucento
- –2023: Virtus Mercadante
- 2023–2025: Pro Vercelli
- 2025: → Torino (loan)

Senior career*
Years	Team	Apps	(Gls)
2024–2026	Pro Vercelli	48	(6)
2026–	Basel	7	(3)
- * Club domestic league appearances and goals as of 28 September 2026

Asane Sow (born 2 May 2006) is an Italian professional footballer who plays as a winger for Swiss Super League club Basel.

== Early life ==
Sow was born on 2 May 2006 and is of Senegalese descent through his parents. Born in Seriate, Italy, he is the twin brother of Italian footballer Ousseynou Sow.

== Career ==
As a youth player, Sow joined the youth academy of Italian side Salus. Following his stint there, he joined the youth academy of Italian side Lucento. Subsequently, he joined the youth academy of Italian side Virtus Mercadante, where he played alongside his twin brother and helped the club's under-17 team win the league title.

In 2023, he joined the youth academy of Italian side Pro Vercelli, helping the club's under-20 team achieve promotion from the third tier to the second tier. One year later, he was promoted to the club's senior team, where he made forty-eight league appearances and scored six goals. On 15 September 2024, he debuted for them during a 1–4 away loss to Caldiero in the league.

During February 2025, he was sent on loan to the youth academy of Italian Serie A side Torino, where he made nine league appearances and scored two goals for the club's under-20 team. Ahead of the 2026–27 season, he signed for Swiss Super League side Basel at ₤600,000, a record transfer for Italian side Pro Vercelli.

== Style of play ==
Sow plays as a winger. Italian newspaper Sprint e Sport wrote in 2026 "he plays primarily as a left winger , but can also be deployed in other offensive positions, including the right flank or a deeper area in the attacking midfield. He's a natural right-footer, a detail that adds variety to his interpretations: he can run deep, but also cut back to create superiority or finish".

Initially, he played as a midfielder upon joining the youth academy of Italian side Pro Vercelli and was known for his speed and strength before developing his goalscoring ability and switching to winger.
