= Philip Otele =

Nigerian footballer (born 1999)

Personal information
- Full name: Philip Porwei Otele
- Date of birth: 15 April 1999 (age 27)
- Place of birth: Port Harcourt, Nigeria
- Height: 1.85 m (6 ft 1 in)
- Position: Winger

Team information
- Current team: Basel
- Number: 7

Youth career
- –2017: Teesside University

Senior career*
Years	Team	Apps	(Gls)
2017–2019	Wolviston FC		
2019–2021	Kauno Žalgiris	64	(13)
2022–2023	UTA Arad	50	(10)
2023–2024	CFR Cluj	40	(18)
2024–2025	Al Wahda	10	(0)
2025	→ Basel (loan)	18	(9)
2025–	Basel	32	(8)
2026	→ Hamburger SV (loan)	9	(1)

International career^{‡}
2026–	Nigeria	5	(0)
- * Club domestic league appearances and goals as of 11 November 2026 ‡ National team caps and goals as of 10 June 2026

Philip Porwei Otele (born 15 April 1999) is a Nigerian professional footballer who plays as a winger for Swiss Super League club Basel and the Nigeria national team.

== Club career ==
=== Early career and Kauno Žalgiris ===
The Nigerian trained with Arsenal as a 14-year-old. Between 2017 and 2019, Otele represented Wearside Premier Division club Wolviston whilst studying at Teesside University. Following his move to Lithuania, Otele revealed he had been unable to accept an offer from Sunderland due to visa restrictions. In May 2019, he signed a contract with Lithuanian club Kauno Žalgiris. Otele established himself as a regular starter in the 2021 season, scoring ten goals and helping Kauno to a consecutive third place in the national league.

=== UTA Arad ===
On 13 January 2022, Otele moved to Romanian side UTA Arad. He made his competitive on 5 February, coming on as a substitute for Karolis Laukžemis in a 1–0 home Liga I win over Sepsi OSK. One month later, he scored his first goal in a 2–1 home victory over Mioveni.

=== CFR Cluj ===
In January 2023, with his UTA Arad deal set to run out in the summer, Otele signed a pre-contract agreement with defending champions CFR Cluj. He was officially unveiled by the club on 16 June, and made his debut one month later, in a 2–0 home Liga win over Politehnica Iași.

On 21 August 2023, Otele scored his first CFR goal in a 4–3 away league victory over city rivals Universitatea Cluj. Five days later, he netted a double in a 3–1 home defeat of Botoșani. On 21 December, he scored another double in 4–0 home derby thrashing of Universitatea Cluj. On 23 February 2024, Otele took his league tally to 11 goals after scoring twice in a 4–0 home defeat of Dinamo București.

In April 2024, amid interest from fellow league team FCSB, CFR Cluj owner Ioan Varga stated that he was negotiating Otele's transfer to Premier League side Brighton & Hove Albion for £6 million and a 20% sell-on clause. On 5 May, he scored his fourth double in a 3–2 home defeat of Rapid București, and six days later netted an overhead kick in a 1–0 away win over eventual champions FCSB.

Otele finished the 2023–24 season as the Liga I top scorer with 18 goals, shared with FCSB's Florinel Coman, while CFR Cluj came second in the league table.

=== Al Wahda ===
On 8 July 2024, Otele was transferred to UAE Pro League club Al Wahda for a €3.5 million fee.

==== Loan to Basel ====
On 15 January 2025, Otele joined Swiss Super League team Basel on loan with an option to buy.

=== Basel ===
==== Loan to Hamburger SV ====
On 2 February 2026, Otele moved on loan to Hamburger SV in German Bundesliga.

== Style of play ==
Naturally right-footed, Otele is typically deployed as a left winger, but can also play on the right flank or in the centre as a striker.

== Career statistics ==
=== Club ===
As of match played 11 November 2026

Appearances and goals by club, season and competition
Club	Season	League			National cup (Note: Includes Lithuanian Cup, Cupa României, UAE President's Cup, Swiss Cup)		Continental		Other		Total	
Club	Season	Division	Apps	Goals	Apps	Goals	Apps	Goals	Apps	Goals	Apps	Goals
Kauno Žalgiris	2019	A Lyga	14	0	2	0	1 (Note: Appearance in UEFA Europa League)	0	—		17	0
Kauno Žalgiris	2020	A Lyga	18	3	2	0	1	1	—		21	4
Kauno Žalgiris	2021	A Lyga	32	10	1	2	4 (Note: Appearances in UEFA Europa Conference League)	0	—		37	12
Kauno Žalgiris	Total		64	13	5	2	6	1	—		75	16
UTA Arad	2021–22	Liga I	16	5	—		—		—		16	5
UTA Arad	2022–23	Liga I	34	5	6	0	—		2 (Note: Appearances in Liga I promotion/relegation play-offs)	1	42	6
UTA Arad	Total		50	10	6	0	—		2	1	58	11
CFR Cluj	2023–24	Liga I	40	18	3	0	2	0	—		45	18
Al Wahda	2024–25	UAE Pro League	10	0	2	0	—		1 (Note: Appearance in UAE League Cup)	0	13	0
Basel (loan)	2024–25	Super League	18	9	3	0	—		—		21	9
Basel	2025–26	Super League	20	5	3	2	8 (Note: Two appearances in UEFA Champions League, six appearances and two goals in UEFA Europa League)	2	—		31	9
Basel	2026–27	Super League	12	3	0	0	0	0	—		12	3
Basel	Total		50	17	6	2	8	2	—		64	21
Hamburger SV (loan)	2025–26	Bundesliga	9	1	—		—		—		9	1
Career total			223	59	22	4	16	3	3	1	264	67

=== International ===
As of match played 10 June 2026

Appearances and goals by national team and year
National team	Year	Apps	Goals
Nigeria	2026	5	0
Total		5	0

== Honours ==
Basel

- Swiss Super League: 2024–25
- Swiss Cup: 2024–25

Individual

- Liga I top scorer: 2023–24 (shared with Florinel Coman)
- Liga I Team of the Season: 2023–24
