= Akpe Victory =

Nigerian footballer (born 2006)

- Victory in 2026

Personal information
- Full name: Victory Maduabuchukwu Akpe
- Date of birth: July 19, 2006 (age 20)
- Place of birth: Abuja, Nigeria
- Height: 1.95 m (6 ft 5 in)
- Position: Centre-back

Team information
- Current team: Basel
- Number: 55

Senior career*
Years	Team	Apps	(Gls)
2025–2026	FK Banga	28	(0)
2026	Zalaegerszeg	13	(1)
2026–	Basel	13	(1)
- * Club domestic league appearances and goals as of 8 November 2026

Victory Maduabuchukwu Akpe (born 19 July 2006) is a Nigerian professional footballer player who plays as a centre-back for Swiss Super League club Basel.

== Club career ==
Victory made his first overseas transfer on 12 February 2025, moving to the Lithuanian club FK Banga.

Victory joined Zalaegerszeg on 9 January 2026.

On 7 July 2026, Victory signed a contract valid until 2030 with the Swiss Super League club Basel.
