= Daniel Stucki =

Swiss footballer (born 1981)

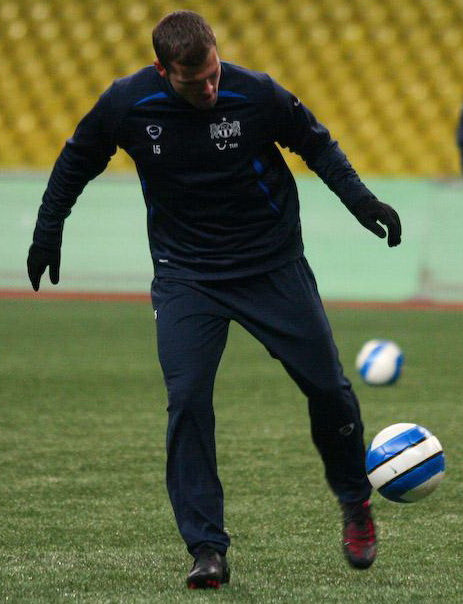

Personal information
- Full name: Daniel Stucki
- Date of birth: 22 September 1981 (age 45)
- Place of birth: Rheinfelden, Switzerland
- Height: 1.80 m (5 ft 11 in)
- Position: Defender

Youth career
- 1988–1995: FC Rheinfelden
- 1995–1998: FC Aesch

Senior career*
Years	Team	Apps	(Gls)
1998–2005	FC Concordia Basel		
2004	→ FC Zürich (loan)	5	(0)
2005–2010	FC Zürich	72	(0)
2010	BSC Old Boys	9	(0)
2010–2011	FC United Zürich		
2012–2013	FC Concordia Basel	21	(3)
2013–2015	FC Allschwil		

Managerial career
- 2018–2019: SC Dornach
- 2020–2022: FC Basel U-21 (assistant)
- 2022–2024: FC Basel Director of FCB-youth
- 2024–2026: FC Basel Sports director
- * Club domestic league appearances and goals

Daniel Stucki (born 22 September 1981) is a retired Swiss footballer and now functionary. He primarily played as defender, either left back or centre back. He was a member of FC Zürich's Swiss Championship winning team in 2005–06, 2006–07 and 2008–09. He retired from professional football in January 2010 at the age of 28.

== Playing career ==
Stucki started his youth football with the local club in Rheinfelden and then in Aesch. in 1998 he moved to Concordia Basel who at that time played in the 1. Liga, the third tier of Swiss football. In their 2000–2001 season Concordia won their group and advanced to the 1. play-offs and the team won the championship. After 42 years of amateur football, Concordia qualified for the professional second division, the National League B.

Stucki stayed with the club for a further three seasons. During this time he was business student at the University of Basel. At the beginning of the 2004–05 Swiss Challenge League season Stucki received an offer from FC Zürich and was loaned out to them for the first half of the season. After the loan period ended he returned to Concordia. He had impressed Zurich's head coach Lucien Favre that match that the club made Stucki the offer to take him on permanently, which he accepted. He was a member of the Swiss Championship winning team in 2005–06, 2006–07 and 2008–09. He retired from professional football in January 2010 at the age of 28.

In his final season of his playing career with Zürich, he was forced to sit out with an ankle injury during the clubs UEFA Champion League campaign. Between the years 2004 and 2010 Stucki played a total of 151 games for Zürich without scoring a goal. 77 of these games were in the Swiss Super League, six in the UEFA Cup, 11 in the Swiss Cup and 57 were friendly games.

After his retirement from professional football, Stucki returned to Basel and was employed by the Kantonspolizei Basel-Stadt. He worked ten years for them as resource planner. During this time he recovered from his injury and played as amateur, at first for half a year for BSC Old Boys. From the 2010/11 season he played for the ambitious 2. Liga club FC United Zürich. After a season and a half, he returned to Concordia Basel. He later played for local teams FC Allschwil and FC Aesch and their over 30s teams.

== Coaching career ==
On 7 Mai 2018 SC Dornach announced that Stucki would become their new coach of the 1st team from 1 July 2018 and that would be his first coaching station at this level.

On 22 July 2020 FC Basel announced that Stucki would be employed as head of the back office of their youth department and would be assistant coach for the U-21 team. Nine months later, the club announced that they had reorganised the youth department and that Stucki had been promoted to the operational management, together with Remo Gaugler (overall management of the youth department), Percy van Lierop (head of youth training) and Pascal Neaf (assessor and delegate of the foundation Youth Campus Basel). Whether or not Stucki would still be assistant coach for the U-21 team in the next season was not mentioned in the notification script.

Following the dismissal of Heiko Vogel, on 31 October 2023, the position of FC Basel's sports director was left vacant, this until 15 May 2024 and then FCB announced that Stucki had been appointed as new sports director.

== Honours ==
FC Zürich

- Swiss Cup: 2004–05
- Super League/Nationalliga A: 2005–06, 2006–07, 2008–09
