= Marvin Akahomen =

Swiss footballer (born 2007)

Personal information
- Date of birth: 15 July 2007 (age 19)
- Place of birth: Switzerland
- Height: 1.86 m (6 ft 1 in)
- Position: Centre-back

Team information
- Current team: SC Kriens (on loan from Basel)
- Number: 14

Youth career
- FC Affoltern
- 2020–2021: Grasshopper
- 2021–2023: Basel

Senior career*
Years	Team	Apps	(Gls)
2022–	Basel U21	52	(1)
2023–	Basel	7	(0)
2025	→ FC Wil (loan)	5	(0)
2026–	→ SC Kriens (loan)	1	(0)

International career^{‡}
2022	Switzerland U15	2	(0)
2022–2023	Switzerland U16	8	(0)
2023–2024	Switzerland U17	14	(1)
2024–2025	Switzerland U18	5	(0)
2024–	Switzerland U19	15	(0)
- * Club domestic league appearances and goals as of 7 August 2026 ‡ National team caps and goals as of 31 March 2026

Marvin Akahomen (born 15 July 2007) is a Swiss professional footballer who plays as a centre-back for Swiss Challenge League club SC Kriens, on loan from Basel.

== Club career ==
Akahomen started played football with local amateur club FC Affoltern, regularly advancing through the ranks, before moving to the youth sector of Grasshopper in 2020, and then joining Basel's academy in August 2021. Having come through the latter club's youth ranks, he started featuring for Basel's reserve team in the Promotion League, the third tier of the Swiss football league system.

In April 2023, Akahomen received his first call-ups to the first team, under interim coach Heiko Vogel, following a number of injuries to squad players. He made his professional debut for Basel on 30 April 2023, coming on as a substitute for Riccardo Calafiori in the 89th minute of a 4–1 away league win over Winterthur: at 15 years and 285 days, he became the third youngest player to ever feature in a Swiss Super League match, behind Endoğan Adili and Sascha Studer, as well as the youngest defender to do so.

Two weeks later, on 14 May 2023, he made his first appearance in the starting eleven, but the league game ended with a 6–1 defeat by St. Gallen. At the age of 15 years and 303 days, he became the second youngest starter in a match of the Swiss top-flight, behind only goalkeeper Sascha Studer on 1 April 2007.

In the first half of the 2023–24 season, Akahomen featured for Basel's U-19 team in the UEFA Youth League.

On 7 January 2025, Akahomen was loaned to FC Wil.

== International career ==
Born in Switzerland, Akahomen is of Nigerian descent. After playing for the Swiss under-15 and under-16 national teams, in May 2023 the defender was included in the final Swiss squad for the UEFA European Under-17 Championship in Hungary. During the tournament, Akahomen scored one goal, as Switzerland eventually got eliminated in the quarter-finals, before losing to England in the FIFA U-17 World Cup play-off.

== Honours ==
Basel

- Swiss Super League: 2024–25

== Career statistics ==
=== Club ===
As of match played 17 December 2023

Appearances and goals by club, season and competition
Club	Season	League	League		National cup (Note: Appearances in the Swiss Cup.)		Continental (Note: Appearances in the UEFA Europa Conference League.)		Other		Total	
Club	Season	League	Apps	Goals	Apps	Goals	Apps	Goals	Apps	Goals	Apps	Goals
Basel	2022–23	Swiss Super League	2	0	0	0	0	0	–		2	0
Career total			2	0	0	0	0	0	0	0	2	0
