= Giacomo Koloto =

Swiss footballer (born 2008)

Personal information
- Date of birth: 31 January 2008 (age 18)
- Place of birth: Zürich, Switzerland
- Height: 1.80 m (5 ft 11 in)
- Positions: Forward; winger

Team information
- Current team: FC Basel
- Number: 37

Youth career
- –2024: Zürich
- 2024–2026: Basel

Senior career*
Years	Team	Apps	(Gls)
2025–2026	Basel U21	9	(4)
2026–	Basel	22	(2)

International career^{‡}
2023–2024	Switzerland U16	6	(3)
2024–2025	Switzerland U17	15	(2)
2025–	Switzerland U18	1	(1)
2026–	Switzerland U21	2	(0)
- * Club domestic league appearances and goals as of 28 September 2026 ‡ National team caps and goals as of 4 April 2026

Giacomo Koloto (born 31 January 2008) is a Swiss professional footballer who plays as forward or winger for FC Basel in the Swiss Super League.

== Club career ==
=== Youth ===
Born in Zürich, Koloto started his early football locally with FC Altstetten (Zürich). He then played his youth football with FC Zürich.

To the beginning of 2024, Koloto moved from Zürich and joined the youth academy of FC Basel, first travelling every day and a few months later he moved to the Youth Campus Basel and lived on one of their accommodation center houses. He played in the club's U-17 team and in November, aged 16, he made his debut for the U-19 team. He finished the season playing in both teams and both teams became Swiss champions in their age groups. From July 2025, Koloto also played for Basel's U-21 team in the 2025–26 Promotion League, the third tier of Swiss football, and there he scored four goals in nine matches, his first goal against FC Zürich U-21 on 9 August was in his second game for the team.

In the 2025–26 UEFA Youth League second round match on 22 October 2025 Koloto scored a goal as Basel U-19 beat Real Betis U-19 by three goals to two.

=== Senior ===
With the change of FCB first team head-coach to Stephan Lichtsteiner at the end of January 2026 the new coach had to search for ways to improve the team's results. He called Koloto into the squad for the match on 1 February against Thun. In the 73rd minute Lichtsteiner substituted the youngster in for his Super League debut. The next day Koloto signed a long-term three-and-half-year professional contract and joined the FCB first team.

He scored his first goal for his new team just three days later, on 4 February in the Swiss Cup away game in the Kybunpark as Basel played im the fourth round against St. Gallen. But it could not help the team, because they lost the match 2–1, due to a goal scored against them during the added the injury time, and were thus eliminated.

Koloto scored his first league goal for the team on 1 March in the away game at the Stade de la Tuilière against Lausanne-Sport. In fact he scored both goals as Basel won the match by two goals to one.

== International career ==
Koloto made his debut for the Swiss national team in May 2023, playing for the U-15 team against Hungary. He scored his first two goals for Switzerland in March 2024 as part of the Switzerland U-16 team against Malta.

Koloto was part of the Swiss U-17 national team that qualified for the World Cup for the second time in their history in 2025. He scored twice in the qualifying rounds in March 2025. At the World Cup in Qatar in November 2025, the Swiss reached the quarterfinals, where they lost to eventual champions Portugal. Koloto scored one goal in the group stage of the tournament in the game against the Ivory Coast as the Swiss won 4–1 on 4 November.

Shortly before the U-17 World Cup, he made his only appearance in the U-18 team in October 2025 in a friendly match against the Netherlands, which he crowned with a goal.

In March 2026, Koloto was called up for the Swiss U-21 national team for the first time by the teams's new coach Alex Frei. In that month, he made his first appearances in the qualification for the European Championship 2027: On 27 March, Koloto played the full match in the victory against the Faroe Islands, and in the victory against Estonia on 31 March, he was substituted out during the 62nd minute.

== Honours ==
Basel

- Swiss champions U-17 and U-19: 2025
