= Jonas Harder =

Italian footballer

Personal information
- Date of birth: 30 September 2005 (age 21)
- Place of birth: Florence, Italy
- Height: 1.78 m (5 ft 10 in)
- Position: Midfielder

Team information
- Current team: Basel
- Number: 44

Youth career
- 2010–2014: Audace Galluzzo
- 2014–2024: Fiorentina

Senior career*
Years	Team	Apps	(Gls)
2024–2026	Fiorentina	0	(0)
2025–2026	→ Padova (loan)	26	(1)
2026–	Basel	7	(0)

International career^{‡}
2024	Italy U19	8	(0)
2024–	Italy U20	8	(0)
- * Club domestic league appearances and goals as of 28 September 2026 ‡ National team caps and goals as of 9 September 2025

Jonas Harder (born 30 September 2005) is an Italian professional footballer who plays as a midfielder for Swiss Super League club Basel.

== Club career ==
Harder began playing football at his local club Galluzzo as a goalkeeper, but moved to the academy of Fiorentina where he was converted to a midfielder. On 17 October 2023, he signed his first professional contract with Fiorentina after climbing up their youth sides. He made his senior and professional debut with Fiorentina as a substitute in a 7–0 win over LASK on 12 December 2024 in a UEFA Conference League game.

On 11 July 2025, Harder was loaned by Padova in Serie B.

On 14 July 2026, Harder signed a four-season contract with Basel in Switzerland.

== International career ==
Harder was born in Italy to a German father and an Italian mother, and holds dual-citizenship. He was part of the Italy U19 squad that played at the 2024 UEFA European Under-19 Championship.

== Career statistics ==
As of match played 12 December 2024

Appearances and goals by club, season and competition
Club	Season	League			Cup		Europe		Other		Total	
Club	Season	Division	Apps	Goals	Apps	Goals	Apps	Goals	Apps	Goals	Apps	Goals
Fiorentina	2024–25	Serie A	0	0	0	0	1 (Note: Appearance in UEFA Conference League)	0	—		1	0
Career total			0	0	0	0	1	0	0	0	1	0
