= Pascal Bader =

Swiss footballer and coach (born 1982)

Personal information
- Date of birth: 24 September 1982 (age 44)
- Place of birth: Zurich, Switzerland
- Height: 1.87 m (6 ft 2 in)
- Positions: Defensive midfielder; centre-back

Senior career*
Years	Team	Apps	(Gls)
2003	FC Solothurn	16	(12)
2004–2005	FC Baden	47	(1)
2005–2008	FC Luzern	86	(8)
2008–2009	VfR Aalen	27	(2)
2009–2013	FC Vaduz	97	(11)
2013–2017	SC Cham	96	(19)
2017–2018	FC Hochdorf	7	(1)
2018–2020	FC Sursee		

Managerial career
- 2017: FC Hochdorf (player-coach)
- 2018–2020: FC Sursee (player-coach)
- 2021–2022: SC Kriens U16
- 2026–: FC Basel (assistant coach)
- * Club domestic league appearances and goals

Pascal Bader (born 24 September 1982) is a Swiss football coach and former professional footballer who currently works as an assistant coach for Swiss Super League club FC Basel.

== Career ==
In 2017 Bader became player-coach of FC Hochdorf.

In January 2026, Bader joined FC Basel to work as an assistant for newly appointed head coach Stephan Lichtsteiner.
