= FC Basel =

Swiss association football club based in Basel

Basel
- Full name: Football Club Basel 1893
- Nicknames: FCB, Bebbi (Citizen of Basel), RotBlau
- Short name: FCB
- Founded: 15 November 1893; 132 years ago
- Ground: St. Jakob-Park
- Capacity: 38,512
- Owner(s): FCB Holding AG (David Degen)
- President: Reto Baumgartner
- Manager: Slaviša Jokanović
- League: Swiss Super League
- 2025–26: Swiss Super League, 5th of 12
- Website: fcb.ch
Home colours	Away colours	Third colours

Fussball Club Basel 1893, widely known as FC Basel, FCB, or just Basel, is a Swiss professional football club based in Basel, in the Canton of Basel-Stadt. Formed in 1893, the club has been Swiss national champions 21 times, Swiss Cup winners 14 times, and Swiss League Cup winners once.

Basel competed in UEFA competitions for 25 consecutive seasons between 1999–2000 and 2023–2024. They have qualified for the group stage of the Champions League more times than any other Swiss club. They are the only Swiss club to have qualified to this phase directly. Since 2001, the club has played its home games at St. Jakob-Park, built on the site of their previous home, St. Jakob Stadium. Their home colours are red and blue, leading to a nickname of RotBlau.

== History ==
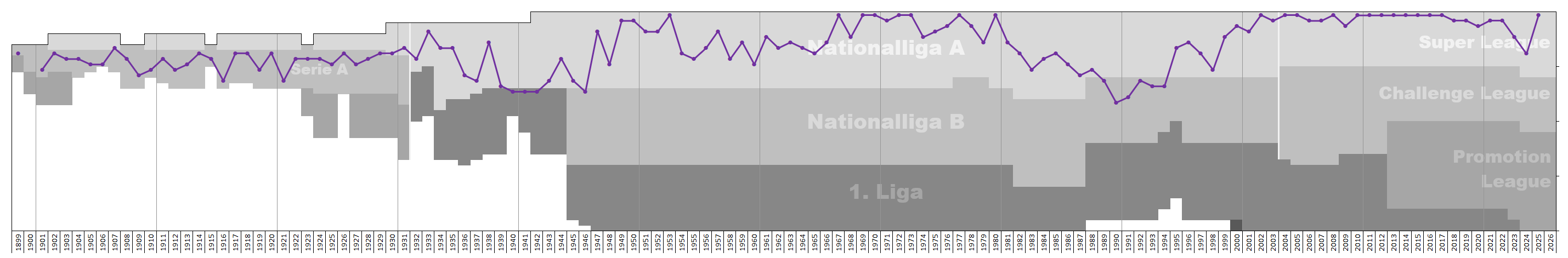
Chart of FC Basel table positions in the Swiss football league system

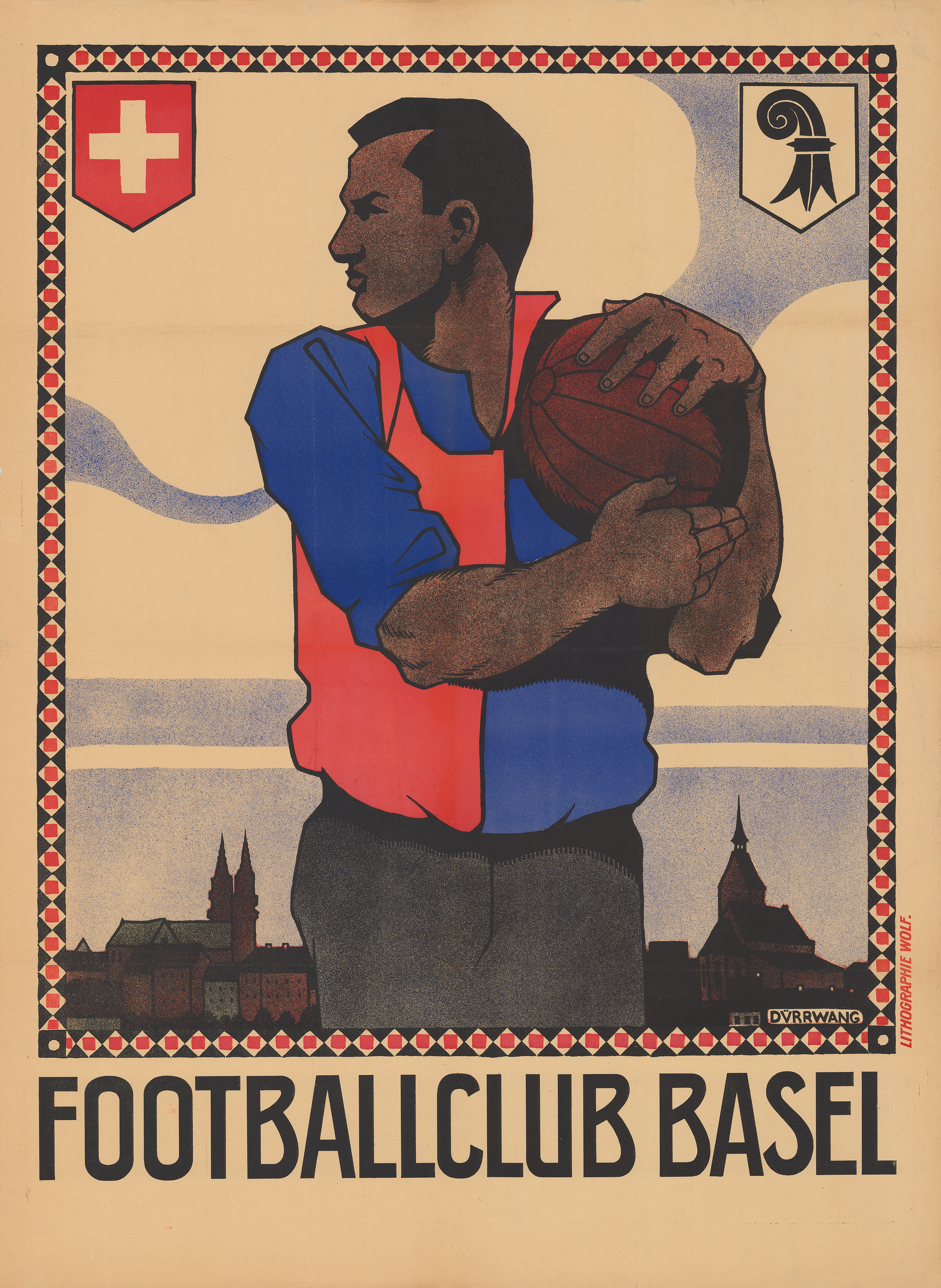
Poster designed by Rudolf Dürrwang (c. 1910)

=== Early years ===
FC Basel was started by an advertisement placed by Roland Geldner in the 12 November 1893 edition of the Basler national newspaper, requesting that a football team be formed and that anyone who wished to join should meet up the following Wednesday at 8:15 in the restaurant Schuhmachern-Zunft. Eleven men attended the meeting, generally from the academic community, founding Fussball Club Basel on 15 November 1893. The club colours from the first day on were red and blue.

Basel's first game was on 26 November 1893, an internal match between two ad hoc FCB teams. Two weeks later, FCB had their first official appearance in a game against a team formed by students from the high school gymnastic club. FCB won 2–0. Basel continued to only play friendly matches, until they joined the second Serie A championship organized by the Swiss Football Association. The Serie A was divided into three regional groups, an east, a central (with FCB) and a west group. The winners of each group qualified for the finals. Basel did not qualify for the finals and they did not compete in the championship the following season.

The Serie A 1900–01 was divided into two groups, an east and a west group. Basel were with three teams from Zürich and two other teams from Basel, Old Boys and Fortuna Basel in the west group. Basel ended the season with two victories, two draws and six defeats in 5th position in the group. Basel did not have much of an early footballing success, waiting 40 years before winning their first trophy.

Gyula Kertész coached the side from 1928 to 1930. At the beginning of the 1932–33 season, the Austrian ex-international footballer Karl Kurz took over as club trainer. There were eight teams in Group 1 of the 1932–33 Nationalliga. Basel finished the season in second position in the table, with seven victories from 14 games. The play-off game between the second placed teams from both groups was held in Basel at the Stadion Rankhof, but the home team lost 3–4 to Servette FC Genève. In the Swiss Cup, Basel advanced to the final, which was played in the Hardturm in Zürich. Basel won 4–3 and thus their first ever national title, defeating arch-rivals and reigning cup-holders Grasshoppers in what is still considered to be one of the best cup finals in Swiss football history.

During the following five seasons, Basel were positioned towards the middle of the Nationliga, not having much to do with the championship not having to worry about relegation. But the 1938–39 Nationalliga did not mean well with them. With just five wins and with twelve defeats, they finished in the last position in the league table and were relegated.

The 1941–42 season was Basel's third season in the 1st League (second flight of Swiss football) after relegation. Eugen Rupf was player-coach for his second year. Basel finished their season as winners of group East. In the play-offs against group West winners Bern, the away tie ending with a goalless draw and Basel won their home tie 3–1 to achieve Promotion. In the Swiss Cup five home games, a coin toss in the quarter-final and a replay in the semi-final was needed to qualify for the final. The final against Grasshoppers ended goalless after extra time and a replay was required here too. In the replay – played at the Wankdorf Stadion against the Nationalliga champions – Basel led at half-time through two goals by Fritz Schmidlin, but two goals from Grubenmann a third from Neukom gave Grasshoppers a 3–2 victory.

After just three seasons in the top flight of Swiss football, Basel suffered relegation again, but achieved immediate re-promotion in the 1944–45 season.

Anton Schall, another Austrian ex-international, became the club's new trainer. Basel finished the Nationalliga A season in fourth position, with 12 victories from 26 games, scoring a total of 60 goals; top league goal scorers were Traugott Oberer (13) and René Bader (10). Basel won the cup for the second time as they beat Lausanne Sports (who had also been runners-up the previous year) 3–0 in the final at the Stadion Neufeld in Bern. Paul Stöcklin scored two goals and Bader scored the other one.

At the beginning of the 1952–53 season, René Bader took over the job as club trainer from Ernst Hufschmid, who had acted as trainer the previous five years. Bader acted as player-manager and Willy Dürr was his assistant; Dürr stood at the side line when Bader played. Basel won their first league title in 1953 and ended the season four points ahead of BSC Young Boys. Basel won 17 of the 26 games, losing only once, and they scored 72 goals conceding 38. Josef Hügi was the team's top league goal scorer.

The Czechoslovak manager Jiří Sobotka was the club manager at this time, he taken the job over from Jenő Vincze the year before. Basel finished the championship in sixth position. Heinz Blumer was Basel's top scorer this season with 16 goals, Karl Odermatt their second best goal scorer with 14. The Wankdorf Stadium hosted the Swiss Cup final on 15 April 1963, and Basel played against favourites Grasshoppers. Two goals after half-time, one by Heinz Blumer and the second from Otto Ludwig, gave Basel a 2–0 victory and their third Cup win in their history. Peter Füri played in all games save the final due to an illness.

On 26 December 1964 FCB played against Grasshoppers Zürich in the quarter-finals of the Swiss Cup. They decided the match 3–1 for themselves in overtime. This was to be the last match for the popular Basler captain of that time Hans Weber, because just seven weeks later he died of cancer. Between his first appearance in 1949 and his death in February 1965 he made 281 appearances for Basel scoring 48 goals.

=== Rise and fall ===
In the 1966–67 season, Benthaus achieved his first league win with Basel. During this season, he acted as player-manager, having taken over the trainer job from Jiří Sobotka at the beginning of the previous season. There were 14 teams contesting in the championship, and Basel finished just one point clear of FC Zürich. Basel won 16 of the 26 games, drawing eight, losing only twice and they scored 60 goals conceding just 20. Roberto Frigerio was the team's top goal scorer with 16 league goals, while Helmut Hauser was second-best with 14.

In the Swiss Cup final that season, Basel's opponents were Lausanne-Sports. In the former Wankdorf Stadium on 15 May 1967, Helmut Hauser scored the decisive goal via a penalty. The game went down in football history due to the sit-down strike that followed this goal. After 88 minutes of play, with the score at 1–1, referee Karl Göppel awarded Basel a controversial penalty: André Grobéty had pushed Hauser gently in the back and he let himself drop theatrically. Subsequent to Basel taking the lead, Lausanne players refused to resume the game, sitting down demonstratively on the pitch. The referee was forced to abandon the match and Basel were awarded the cup with a 3–0 default victory.

Basel had won the double for the first time in the club's history.

The league title in 1966–67 led to Basel qualifying to play in the European Cup for the first time, in 1967–68. Basel, however, were knocked out of the tournament in the First Round by Danish side Akademisk Boldklub.

Basel's next league title was achieved in the 1968–69 Nationalliga A season as they once again finished just one point above the runners-up, this time Lausanne Sports. In the Swiss Cup, Basel reached the quarter-finals. This championship title meant that Basel could embark on another European adventure, but again they failed to overcome the first hurdle; this time it was Celtic of Scotland. Nationally in the 1969–70 season, Basel won the league for the fourth time again one point ahead of Lausanne Sports. In the Swiss Cup, Basel reached the final.

The European Cup was a little kinder to Basel in 1970–71, as they reached the Second Round, losing to Ajax after defeating Soviets Spartak Moscow in the first round. Basel did not retain their title the following season despite finishing with the same number of points as the subsequent champions, Grasshoppers, who won the title on a head-to-head. In the Swiss Cup, Basel reached the quarter-finals.

After a trophy-less season, Basel again won two league titles in-a-row. The 1971–72 season was the last season for Helmut Benthaus as an active footballer. Basel won the championship four points ahead of Zürich. In the Swiss Cup, Basel reached the final but were defeated 0–1 by Zürich through a goal in extra time. In the 1971–72 UEFA Cup, Basel were drawn against Real Madrid. The home game attracted 32,059 spectators, but Basel were defeated 1–2 and lost overall 2–4 on aggregate.

The 1972–73 season was Benthaus' eighth season as manager. Basel won 17 of their 26 league games and won the championship four points ahead of Grasshoppers. Ottmar Hitzfeld was the league's joint top goal scorer with 18 league goals. In the Swiss Cup, Basel played Martigny-Sports, Young Boys, FC Chiasso and FC Biel-Bienne to reach the final against Zürich. The 1972 Swiss League Cup was the inaugural Swiss League Cup competition. It was played in the summer of 1972 as a pre-season tournament to the 1972–73 season. This was won by Basel who defeated FC Winterthur 4–1 in the final in which Hitzfeld scored a hattick. In Europe, Basel failed to impress once again, in 1972–73, as they were sent crashing out at the first stage by Hungary's Újpesti Dózsa SC.

But in the 1973–74 season, they excelled with the Peruvian legend Teófilo Cubillas in their ranks, eliminating Icelanders Fram Reykjavík and Club Brugge of Belgium, before narrowly exiting in the quarter-finals to Celtic 5–6 on aggregate after extra time in the away leg. In the 1973–74 Nationalliga A season Basel finished in just 5th position winning 13 of their 26 league games, drawing twice and suffering 10 defeats, gaining 29 points. They finished 16 points behind the new champions Zürich. Ottmar Hitzfeld was the teamst top goal scorer with 19 league goals. He ended the Swiss ranking in third position behind Daniel Jeandupeux (Zürich, 22 goals) and Walter Müller (Lausanne-Sports, 21 goals). In the Swiss Cup Basel proceeded to the quarter-finals, in which they played against Sion. Sion won the two legged round 3–2 on aggregate.

Despite Basel's improvement on the European stage, they did not retain the league for another four years. At the end of the 1974–75 Nationalliga A season Basel finished in fourth position (11 wins, 9 draws, 2 defeats, 49–33 goals) 8 points adrift of FC Zürich who won the championship for the second time in a row. In the League Cup Basel reached the semi-finals. But they did manage to lift the Swiss Cup in 1975, beating Winterthur 2–1 in the Final after extra time and therefore qualifying for the 1975–76 Cup Winners' Cup.

Basel's long-awaited title-win came in 1977 as they triumphed over Servette FC in a playoff. This meant that Basel returned to play in the European Cup, but they were defeated in the first round, once more, by Wacker Innsbruck of Austria, after showing so much promise on their last European outing. After the success of the 1976–77 season, Basel endured two seasons of below-par performances and mid-table finishes until glory returned in 1980, as Basel won the Nationalliga A title through the playoff. However, manager Helmut Benthaus left in 1982 and in the following seasons, Basel's final league positions started to drop until their relegation into the Nationalliga B in 1988.

Several managers came and went at the St. Jakob Stadium between then, until Basel finally returned to the Nationalliga A in 1994 under Claude Andrey. Basel avoided relegation by three points in their first season back at the top-flight, but Andrey left and was replaced by Karl Engel. Engel led Basel to a fifth-place finish in his first season in charge and a solid mid-table finish in 1997, but he was sacked after a poor start to the 1997–98 campaign, in which Basel finished second-last. Jörg Berger then took over but lasted only a year in charge before Christian Gross was appointed. Gross' appointment went hand-in-hand with the financial backing that had just been put into the club and it was not long until Basel returned to the top.

=== Return of the glory days ===
The St. Jakob-Park was opened on 15 March 2001, and Basel finished the 2000–01 season in fourth position in the league. Basel ended the qualification round of 2001–02 leading the league table by five points at the winter break. The Championship round began in February and with ten wins and just one defeat in the first 11 games, Basel pulled away at the top of the table to win the championship three games before the end of the season, their first title for 22 years. They went on to complete a domestic double, beating Grasshoppers in extra time in the Swiss Cup thanks to a penalty scored by Murat Yakin. Basel also reached the final of the UEFA Intertoto Cup.

In the 2002–03 season, Basel became the second Swiss team to play in the revamped UEFA Champions League. They reached the second group round, but were knocked out on goal difference in a group containing Manchester United, Juventus, and Deportivo de La Coruña. In domestic competitions, Basel finished second in the Swiss Super League and won the Swiss Cup after beating Neuchâtel Xamax 6–0 in the final.

Basel started 2003–04 with 13 straight league wins, and went on to complete the first half of the season undefeated, with 17 wins and 1 draw. Basel remained top of the league for the rest of the season, winning their 10th Swiss championship. In the UEFA Cup they were eliminated by Newcastle United in the second round after defeating Malatyaspor in the previous round.

As Swiss champions, Basel entered the 2004–05 Champions League in the third qualifying round. They were drawn against Internazionale, who beat them 5–2 on aggregate, dropping Basel into the UEFA Cup. After beating Russian side Terek Grozny in the third round they were drawn in Group E with Feyenoord, Schalke 04, Ferencváros and Hearts. They finished third in the group on seven points and qualified for the Round of 32, where they were defeated 2–0 on aggregate by Lille. In the domestic league, after a poor start, Basel moved to the top of the league table and went on to win the title by ten points. Basel completed their 17 home league games undefeated, winning 13 and drawing four, including an 8–1 win against Grasshoppers, in which Christian Giménez scored four goals.

Basel were knocked out of the 2005–06 Champions League in the third qualifying round by German club Werder Bremen. They again dropped into the UEFA Cup, where they beat Široki Brijeg of Bosnia and Herzegovina to be drawn into Group E alongside Strasbourg, Roma, Red Star Belgrade and Tromsø. They finished third in the group, qualifying for the knockout stage. After beating Monaco and Strasbourg once again, they were eliminated by Middlesbrough in the quarter final. On 26 February 2006, Basel broke their own club record of 52 unbeaten league games at home, which they extended to 59. The winning streak was ended on the final day of the season with a last-minute goal by Iulian Filipescu giving FC Zürich a 2–1 win and, in the process, Zürich's first national championship since 1980–81. This resulted in riots between rival supporters after the match.

In 2006–07 Basel were again runners-up to Zürich in the league, and won the Swiss Cup for the eight time, beating FC Luzern 1–0 in the final. In the 2006–07 UEFA Cup Basel beat Kazakh side Tobol, Liechtensteiner team FC Vaduz, and Macedonians FK Rabotnički. to qualify for the group stages. Drawn against Blackburn Rovers, Nancy, Feyenoord and Wisła Kraków, Basel finished bottom of the group and were eliminated.

=== Recent years ===
Basel were drawn against Bosnian team FK Sarajevo in the first qualifying round of the UEFA Cup, a tie that Basel won 8–1 on aggregate. In the next round, Basel faced a considerably tougher opponent in the form of SV Mattersburg of Austria. Nonetheless, Basel finished the tie off with a 4–0 away win after a 2–1 victory at St. Jakob-Park. Basel were then drawn into the group of death of Group D alongside Brann, Dinamo Zagreb, Hamburger SV and Rennes, all of which were ranked within the top three of their own leagues at the start of the stage. Basel won their first UEFA Cup group game against Rennes at home 1–0 thanks to a Marco Streller header. Their next game was away to Dinamo Zagreb in which Basel earned a valuable away point thanks to on form goalkeeper Franco Costanzo, who kept the game at 0–0 for 90 minutes. They then faced Brann at St. Jakob-Park, where they won 1–0 through a Carlitos free-kick and were highly praised for playing attractive and flowing football. Basel then went to Germany to face Hamburger SV at the HSH Nordbank Arena, where they were fortunate to escape with a 1–1 draw. The goals came courtesy of captain Ivan Ergić and Hamburg's Ivica Olić.

Basel then faced Sporting CP in the last 32 after qualifying second in the group alongside first-placed Hamburg and third-placed Brann. (Sporting finished third in their group in the Champions League, which is why they were dropped into the UEFA Cup.) The first leg took place on 13 February in Lisbon, where first-choice goalkeeper Franco Costanzo was injured and Basel lost 2–0. The second leg did not fare any better for Basel. Costanzo remained injured and Basel lost 3–0 on 21 February in Basel, falling from the UEFA Cup.

Basel won the Swiss Cup for the second consecutive season after beating second-tier side AC Bellinzona 4–1 at St. Jakob-Park on 6 April 2008. Eren Derdiyok gave Basel the lead in the first half before Bellinzona equalised through Christian Pouga in the second. Daniel Majstorović restored the lead for Basel with a header and Swiss internationals Marco Streller and Benjamin Huggel scored one goal each to make the final scoreline 4–1 in Basel's favour.

Basel won the Swiss Super League for the first time since 2005 on 10 May 2008 at home after a 2–0 win over title threats BSC Young Boys. It was the last game of the season and Basel only needed a point from the match to win the Championship, but if Young Boys won, then they would be champions, exactly the same situation as the end of the 2005–06 season with FC Zürich. The painful memories of losing the league on the last day of the season in 2006 seemed to spur FCB on as they took an early lead through Valentin Stocker before Marco Streller wrapped up the victory with the second.

In 2008–09 season, Basel entered the Champions League in the Second Qualifying Round and were drawn against IFK Göteborg of Sweden. The first leg was on 30 July 2008 at Ullevi and finished 1–1. Benjamin Huggel put Basel ahead before Thomas Olsson equalised for the home team. The second leg took place on 6 August at St. Jakob-Park, with Basel coming from behind twice to win 4–2. Basel then faced Vitória de Guimarães of Portugal in the Third Qualifying Round. The first leg at the Estádio D. Afonso Henriques on 13 August ended in a 0–0 draw. The second leg took place on 27 August at St. Jakob-Park, where Valentin Stocker gave Basel an early lead on 11 minutes before João Alves was fouled in the penalty area by François Marque and João Fajardo dispatched the spot-kick, just four minutes later to draw Vitória level. In the second half, the away side started well but Eren Derdiyok gave FCB a 2–1 lead which they hung on to, thus qualifying for the Champions League Group stages. FCB were drawn into Group C alongside Barcelona, Shakhtar Donetsk and Sporting CP. Basel lost their opening game 2–1 at St. Jakob-Park on 16 September against Shakhtar. Fernandinho put the Ukrainians ahead on 25 minutes before Jádson doubled their lead just before half time. David Abraham scored a late consolation goal for the home team. Sporting CP were the opponents on Matchday 2 (1 October) and despite defending well and causing a few scares at the other end of the park, Basel were defeated 2–0 at the Estádio José Alvalade. On Matchday 3 (22 October), Barcelona visited Basel and came away with a 5–0 win, but a fortnight later it was a different story as FCB came away with a respectable 1–1 draw at the Camp Nou, with Eren Derdiyok scoring a late equaliser after Lionel Messi put Barça ahead. On 26 November, Basel travelled to Ukraine to play Shakhtar, where they were thrashed 5–0. Basel then faced Sporting at home on the final Matchday (9 December) and were defeated 1–0.

Despite remaining in first or second position for most of the season, Basel finished in third place behind FC Zürich and Young Boys. On 27 May, Christian Gross was sacked from his role as FC Basel manager after ten years in the job.

In 2009–10 season, German Thorsten Fink was appointed as Basel's new manager on 9 June 2009. Basel entered the UEFA Europa League in the second qualifying round. They qualified for the group stage and were drawn into Group E alongside Roma, Fulham and CSKA Sofia. Basel finished in third place.

In domestic affairs, Basel s won the title on the last day of the season against favourites Young Boys at the Stade de Suisse. Marco Streller was the league's top scorer with 21 goals. Basel won the 2009–10 Swiss Cup final with a 6–0 victory over FC Lausanne-Sport, FC Basel's tenth cup win.

In 2010–11 season, Basel entered the 2010–11 UEFA Champions League in the third qualifying round, drawn against Debrecen; they won both games (2–0, 3–1). In the play-offs to the Champions League, they are drawn against Sheriff Tiraspol. In the first leg, they defeated Tiraspol 1–0 before winning 3–0 on the road. Basel entered the 2010–11 UEFA Champions League group stage in Group E.

On 13 October 2011, Thorsten Fink left the club to join Hamburger SV. As replacement, his assistant Vogel was signed as caretaker manager until the winter break. Basel historically qualified for the knockout phase of the Champions League with 2–1 win over Manchester United on 7 December 2011. On 12 December, it was announced that Vogel had signed as head coach and manager. On 22 February 2012, Basel defeated Bayern Munich in the first leg of the Round of 16 stage in the Champions League. They won with a score of 1–0, scoring in the 86th minute of the game, but then lost in the return leg 7–0, thus eliminating them.

On 15 October 2012, manager Heiko Vogel was sacked by the club and replaced by former player Murat Yakin. At the end of the first half of the season, Basel were in second position in the domestic league table. In the second half of the season, Basel acquired enough points to finish the season three points ahead of Grasshoppers and to win their fourth title in a row.

As Swiss champions, Basel entered the Champions League in the second qualifying round, where they were drawn against Estonian club Flora Tallinn, winning 5–0 on aggregate. In the third round, they were drawn against Norwegian club Molde, winning 2–1 on aggregate. In the playoff round, however, Basel lost both games against CFR Cluj from Romania, being knocked out 3–1 on aggregate. The team thus qualified for the Europa League group stage, where they were drawn into Group G alongside Sporting CP, Genk and Videoton. They finished in second place in the table and thus continued after the winter break in the knockout phase round of 32. In the knockout phase round of 32, Basel were drawn against Dnipro Dnipropetrovsk. Basel won 3–1 on aggregate. In the round of 16, they were drawn against Zenit Saint Petersburg and, despite being the underdogs, they qualified for the quarter-finals by winning 2–1 on aggregate. Here Basel were drawn against Tottenham Hotspur, which they beat 4–1 on penalties after a 4–4 aggregate draw to progress to the semi-finals. The draw for the semi-final matched them against reigning Champions League holders Chelsea. Both games in the tie ended with a defeat, 1–2 in Basel 1–3 in London.

Basel's 2013–14 UEFA Champions League season started on 30 July 2013 in the third qualifying round with a tie in St. Jakob-Park against Maccabi Tel Aviv, which they won 4–3 on aggregate. In the first match of the main group stage, Basel notched up a surprising 2–1 away win against Chelsea at Stamford Bridge and followed this up with a 1–0 home win in the return fixture at St. Jakob-Park. Despite these two results, they only finished in third position in the league table and thus they qualified for the 2013–14 Europa League round of 32. There, they fought Israeli team Maccabi Tel Aviv and went on to defeat Red Bull Salzburg 2–1 on aggregate. They would face Valencia in the quarter-finals, winning 3–0 at home, but losing 0–5 in Valencia after extra-time.

On 28 May 2014, Basel announced that Paulo Sousa was to become their trainer for the new season and that he had signed a three-year contract. They went on to win the league championship for the sixth time in a row. In the Swiss Cup, Basel ended as runners-up, losing 0–3 to FC Sion in the final.

Basel entered the Champions League in the group stage. They reached the knockout phase against Liverpool on 9 December on a night in which Lazar Marković was sent off for the opponents. Basel then lost to Porto in the Round of 16.

Paulo Sousa left the club prior to the 2015–16 season for Fiorentina; he was replaced by FC Thun head coach Urs Fischer on 18 June.

Basel entered into the 2015–16 Champions League season in the Third qualifying round. Their initial aim was to remain in the competition and reach the group stage. In the third qualifying round, they were drawn against Lech Poznań and in the play-off round against Maccabi Tel Aviv. Basel failed to qualify for the Champions League group stage, thus they dropped into the 2015–16 UEFA Europa League group stage. Here they were drawn into Group I, together with Fiorentina, Lech Poznań and Belenenses. Because they finished as group winners, Basel continued in the knockout phase in February 2016. Basel were drawn against French side Saint-Étienne. They advanced on away goals after a 4–4 aggregate draw with Saint-Étienne. They were knocked out of the tournament by the eventual winners, Sevilla, 3–0 in the round of 16.

On 30 April 2016, Basel confirmed a seventh consecutive Swiss national championship with a 2–1 win over FC Sion at St. Jakob-Park. At the end of the season Basel won the title 14 points ahead of Young Boys.

Basel entered into the 2016–17 UEFA Champions League in the Group stage. Drawn against French champions Paris Saint-Germain, English team Arsenal and Bulgarian champions Ludogorets Razgrad they finished bottom of the group and were eliminated.

Basel won the Swiss Super League for the eighth time in a row – the club's 20th championship title in total. They also won the Swiss Cup for the twelfth time, completing a sixth double.

In 2017–18 season, Raphaël Wicky was appointed as new first team manager, assisted by Massimo Lombardo. The club's eight-year monopoly over the Swiss league title ended in 2018, as BSC Young Boys won the domestic championship. Basel finished second on 69 points, while Young Boys romped to the title, winning the league by a 15-point margin.

Later on, Basel reached the quarter-finals of the 2019–20 UEFA Europa League for the third time after 2012–13 and 2013–14.

Since 2021, FC Basel has undergone major structural and sporting changes following the takeover by former player David Degen, who became the club's majority shareholder in May 2021.

During the 2021–22 season, Basel finished second in the Swiss Super League behind FC Zürich. Coach Patrick Rahmen was dismissed in February 2022 and replaced on an interim basis by Guillermo Abascal.

In the 2022–23 season, Alex Frei became head coach, while former Basel coach Heiko Vogel returned to the club as sporting director. Basel reached the semi-finals of the UEFA Europa Conference League, defeating Slovan Bratislava and Nice before losing to Fiorentina after extra time. Domestically, the club finished fifth in the league.

The 2023–24 season proved difficult for Basel. Following extensive squad turnover and several managerial changes, including spells under Timo Schultz and Heiko Vogel, Fabio Celestini was appointed head coach in October 2023. Basel eventually finished eighth in the Swiss Super League.

In August 2024, former Basel and Switzerland international Xherdan Shaqiri returned to the club after more than a decade abroad. Under Fabio Celestini, Basel improved significantly during the 2024–25 season and won their first Swiss Super League title since 2017. Basel also won the Swiss Cup in 2025, defeating FC Biel-Bienne 4–1 in the final and securing the club's seventh domestic double.

== Supporters and rivalries ==
=== Fans ===
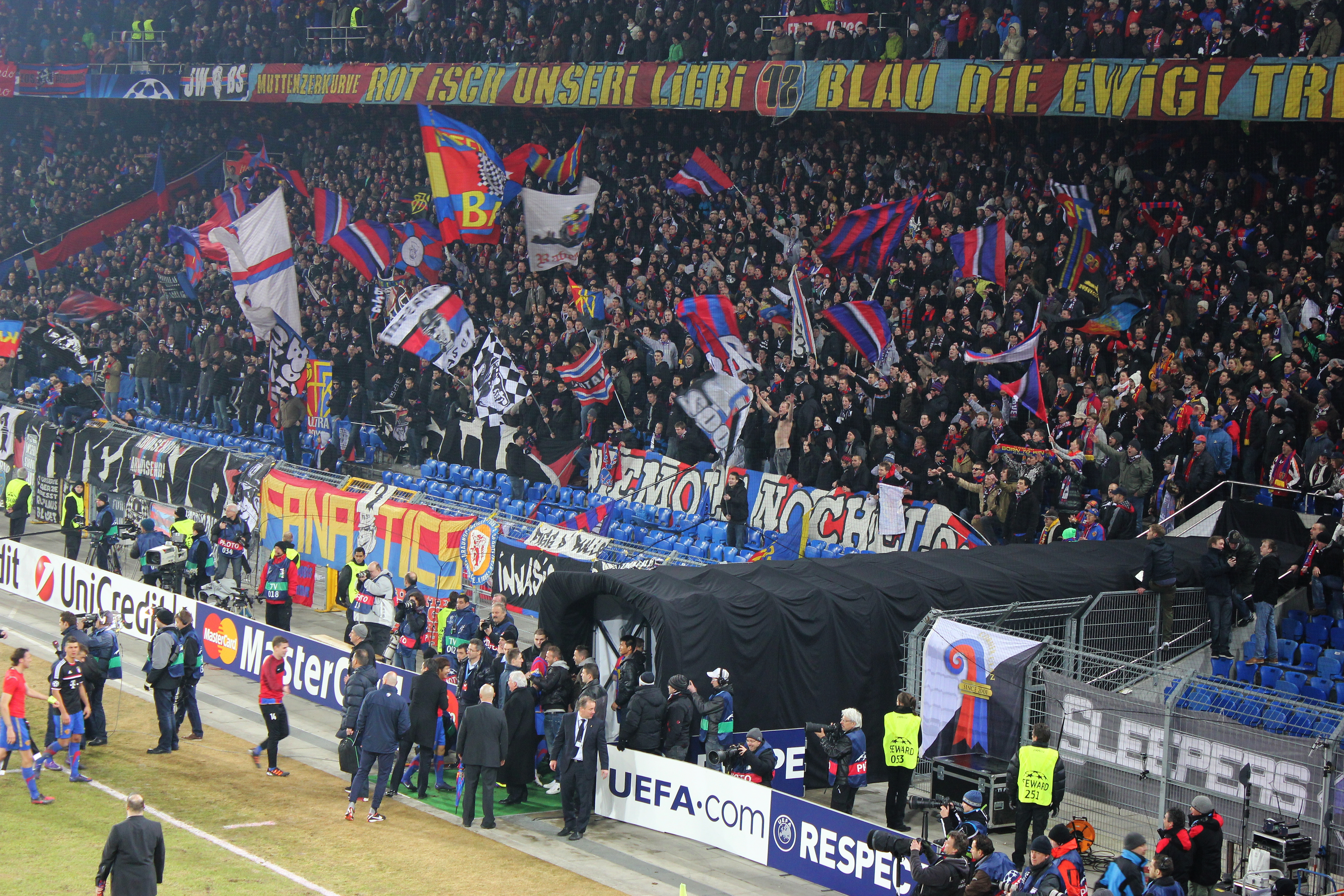
FC Basel supporters at a 2011–12 UEFA Champions League match against FC Bayern Munich in St.-Jakob-Park

FC Basel has significant local support. According to polls ("Muttenzerkurve"), FC Basel's fans often rank in the top 100 in the world. Consequently, FC Basel has the highest average attendance in Switzerland with around 30,000 fans at every home game. World tennis legend Roger Federer is one of the club's most famous fans.

In November 2010, their supporters caused the game against FC Luzern to be stopped after they threw hundreds of tennis balls onto the pitch. This was in protest at the kickoff times being moved to accommodate a tennis tournament on television.

=== Rivalry ===
Basel and Zürich have a long-standing rivalry. FCB's traditional and fiercest rivals are Grasshopper Club Zürich and FC Zürich. In the past four seasons, the rivalry between FC Zürich and Basel has been fueled by Zürich's league championships. Supporters from both sides have caused trouble in the past years, with the worst incident happening in May 2006. Basel had won the league in 2003–04 and 2004–05 and were set to make it three in a row if they won or drew against Zürich at home on the last day of the 2005–06 season. Zürich took the lead after a late goal from Iulian Filipescu and consequently won the match and the league. After the final whistle, players and fans from both teams started fighting on the pitch and in the stands. This incident has fueled hatred and bitterness between fans from FC Zürich and FC Basel over the last two decades. In addition, Basel and the Grasshoppers regularly exchange players, while it is extremely rare to see transfers between Basel and FCZ.

== Stadium ==
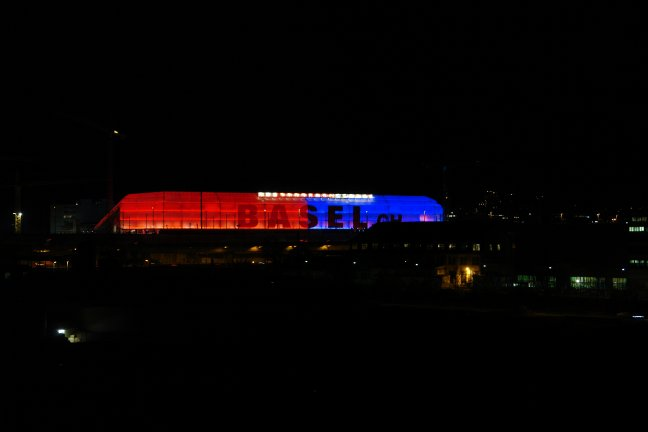
St. Jakob-Park at night

FC Basel play their home games at the 37,500-seat St. Jakob-Park.

UEFA have awarded the stadium a 4-star rating, the highest rating that can be awarded to a stadium of that capacity. St. Jakob-Park was opened in 2001, originally with maximum capacity of 33,433. The stadium was expanded with a new stand (sector G) and upgraded to 42,500 due to Switzerland co-hosting UEFA Euro 2008. After Euro 2008, a number of seats were removed and the capacity was reduced 37,500 seats. The stadium is nicknamed "Joggeli" by the fans and has two restaurants, Restaurant UNO and Hattrick's Sports Bar, as well as a shopping center which opened on 1 November 2001. It has parking spaces for 680 cars and its own train station. St. Jakob-Park hosted six matches during Euro 2008, including the opening game between Switzerland and Czech Republic, and a semi-final between Germany and Turkey. The most interesting feature of the stadium is the translucent outer layer, which can be illuminated in different colours for impressive effects; this effect was copied three years later for Bayern Munich's new stadium, the Allianz Arena.

Before St. Jakob-Park was built, FC Basel played home games in the Landhof (in the Quarter Kleinbasel) and, following the 1954 FIFA World Cup, in the newly built St. Jakob Stadium which was on the same site as the current stadium. During the construction period of St. Jakob-Park, Basel's home matches were played at the Stadion Schützenmatte.

In 2016, the UEFA Europa League final was played at St. Jakob-Park.

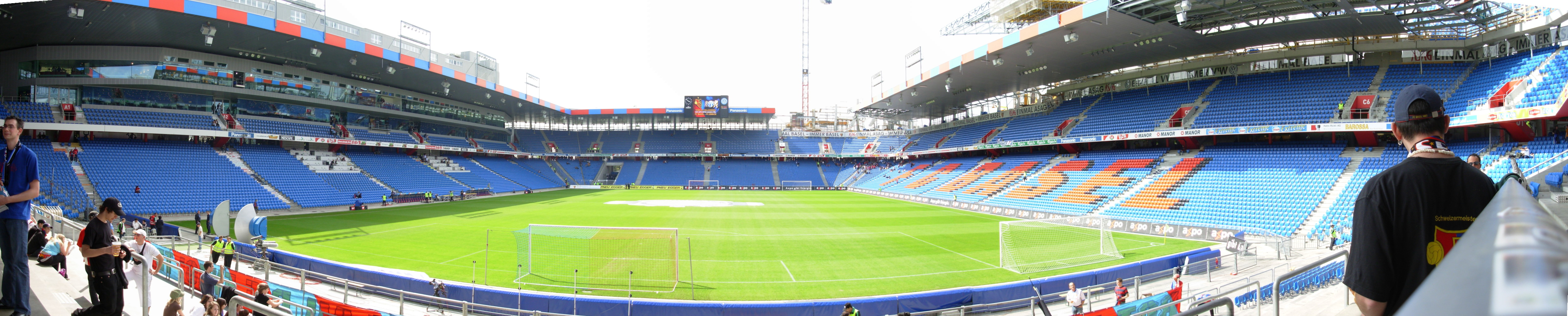
St. Jakob-Park from the inside

== Affiliated clubs ==
- (Switzerland) FC Concordia Basel – FC Basel are the parent-club of local side Concordia, who currently play in the 1. Liga Classic. Many of Basel's youth players, such as Patrik Baumann, Beg Ferati, and Simone Grippo, have had loan spells there. Basel have also signed a number players from Concordia, like Louis Crayton and Murat Yakin. Miroslav König, Riccardo Meili, André Muff, and Dominik Ritter are just a few ex-Basel players who have gone on to play for Concordia.

== Colours and logo ==
FC Basel's traditional kit is a red and blue shirt. Due to the fact that some of the founders were members of the "Basler Ruder-Club", whose colors were red and blue, they adopted those colours for their new club. FC Basel's outfit is completed by blue shorts with gold trim and blue socks with red trim. From this comes the nickname "RotBlau" which is Swiss German and German for "RedBlue". Their away kit is all white with two stripes down the middle, the left being red and the right being blue. FC Basel's kits are manufactured by Macron, since 2025. Previously the kits were manufactured by Nike, however in the summer of 2012 a new contract was formed with Adidas to produce the kits until 2017. The main sponsor is Novartis, a multinational pharmaceutical company which is based in the city of Basel. On the inside tag of the jerseys is inscribed "Rot isch unseri Liebi, Blau die ewigi Treui, Basel unseri Stadt." This roughly translates to "Red is our love, blue the eternal loyalty, Basel our city."

According to a legend, the famous "Blaugrana" colours of Barcelona have been said to have originated from the Rotblau colours of FC Basel. This legend evolved because Joan Gamper, founder of both FC Zürich and FC Barcelona had played two friendly games for FC Basel against Mulhouse and Strasbourg on short visits, as he did for other Swiss clubs, too. FC Barcelona today based on accounts of the Gamper family assumes, the colours had been taken from the rugby team of the Merchant Taylors' School near Liverpool.

For the 2008–09 season, Basel changed their shirt to resemble the traditional Barcelona shirt (red and blue vertical stripes). Barcelona changed theirs to one half of the shirt red, the other blue, which happens to resemble the traditional Basel shirt.

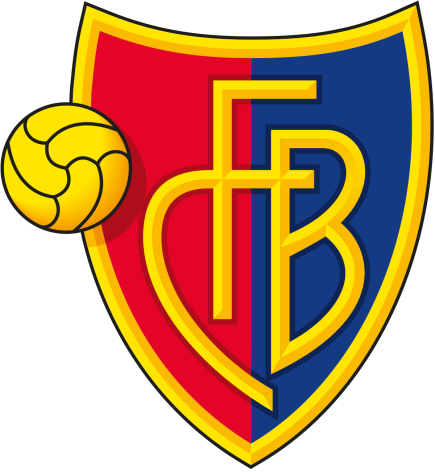
Old FC Basel logo without the two stars

Basel's current logo is a shield, the left half red and the right half blue. The shield is outlined with gold and in the centre in gold letters it reads "FCB", for "Football Club Basel" or "Fussballclub Basel". The logo is worn in the centre of the shirt opposed to on the traditional left-hand side. Like the club colours of Basel, the logo has a striking resemblance to that of Barcelona's. There are theories that suggest that the founder of Barcelona, being at one time the captain of Basel, reincorporated the logo of Basel to that of Barcelona. The resemblances seem clear: both logos seem to incorporate the shield design, as do most other clubs. Most notably, however, is the FCB acronyms on both logos and the red-blue colours, outlined in gold. Additionally, the football that lies on the left side of the Basel logo seems to be the exact shape, type and colour as that of the Barcelona logo in the bottom centre. Because of this, many say that Basel was the inspiration in the process of founding Barcelona.

== Records ==
- Furthest stage reached in Champions League: Round of 16 (2002–03, 2011–12, 2014–15, 2017–18)
- Furthest stage reached in UEFA Europa League: Semi-finals (2012–13)
- Furthest stage reached in UEFA Conference League: Semi-finals (2022–23)
- Biggest European home win: Basel 7–0 (San Marino) Folgore (24 August 2000, UEFA Cup qualifying round second leg)
- Biggest European away win: (Iceland) Fram 0–5 Basel (18 September 1973, European Champion Clubs' Cup first round first leg)
- Biggest European home defeat: Basel 0–5 (Spain) Barcelona (22 October 2008, UEFA Champions League)
- Biggest European away defeat: (Germany) Bayern Munich 7–0 Basel (13 March 2012, UEFA Champions League knockout stage)
- Most league appearances: (Switzerland) Massimo Ceccaroni (398)
- Most league goals: (Switzerland) Josef Hügi (244)
- Record number of consecutive home games unbeaten: 59 (February 2003 to May 2006)
- Record number of consecutive unbeaten games: 26 (2011–12)
- Highest home game attendance (St. Jakob Stadium): 60,000
- Highest home game attendance (St. Jakob-Park): 42,500
- Most capped foreign player: Teófilo Cubillas, 81 caps, Peru
- Most capped Swiss player: (Switzerland) Alexander Frei, 82 caps

=== Individual records, league ===
Updated to league matches played on 22 May 2022.

Top league goalscorers
#	Nat.	Name	Career	Goals
1	(Switzerland)	Josef Hügi	1948–1962	245
2	(Switzerland)	Erni Maissen	1975–1982; 1983–1987; 1989–1991	116
3	(Switzerland)	Marco Streller	2000–2004; 2007–2015	111
4	(Argentina)	Christian Giménez	2001–2005	94
5	(Switzerland)	Karl Odermatt	1963–1976	92
6	(Switzerland)	René Bader	1946–1953	90
=7	(Austria)	Otto Haftl	1931–1935	81
=7	(Switzerland)	Gottlieb Stäuble	1946–1951; 1955–1959	81
9	(Switzerland)	Hermann Suter	1939–1948	79
=10	(Switzerland)	Alexander Frei	1997–1998; 2009–2013	74
=10	(Switzerland)	Alfred Schlecht	1922–1924; 1925–1936	74
=10	(Switzerland)	Roberto Frigerio	1958–1968	74
=10	(Switzerland)	Valentin Stocker	2007–2014; 2018–2022	74

Most league appearances
#	Nat.	Name	Career	Apps
1	(Switzerland)	Massimo Ceccaroni	1987–2002	398
2	(Switzerland)	Erni Maissen	1975–1982; 1983–1987; 1989–1991	338
3	(Switzerland)	Fabian Frei	2007–2015; 2018–2024	322
4	(Switzerland)	Werner Bopp	1944–1960	321
5	(Switzerland)	Josef Hügi	1948–1962	319
6	(Switzerland)	Otto Demarmels	1967–1982	307
7	(Switzerland)	Jörg Stohler	1970–1984	306
8	(Switzerland)	Benjamin Huggel	1998–2005; 2007–2012	297
9	(Switzerland)	Karl Odermatt	1963–1976	296
10	(Switzerland)	Karl Bielser	1916–1936	293
11	(Switzerland)	Valentin Stocker	2007–2014; 2018–2022	286
12	(Australia)	Scott Chipperfield	2001–2012	270

=== Individual records, all competitions ===
Updated to all matches played on 22 May 2022.

Top goalscorers all competitions
#	Nat.	Name	Career	Goals
1	(Switzerland)	Josef Hügi	1948–1962	282
2	(Switzerland)	Marco Streller	2000–2004; 2007–2015	144
3	(Switzerland)	Erni Maissen	1975–1982; 1983–1987; 1989–1991	143
4	(Switzerland)	Karl Odermatt	1963–1976	123
5	(Switzerland)	René Bader	1946–1953	117
6	(Argentina)	Christian Giménez	2001–2005	116
7	(Switzerland)	Alexander Frei	1997–1998; 2009–2013	109
8	(Germany)	Helmut Hauser	1964–1972	107
9	(Switzerland)	Hermann Suter	1939–1948	104
10	(Switzerland)	Roberto Frigerio	1958–1968	103
11	(Austria)	Otto Haftl	1931–1935	102
12	(Switzerland)	Valentin Stocker	2007–2014; 2018–2022	101

Most appearances all competitions
#	Nat.	Name	Career	Apps
1	(Switzerland)	Fabian Frei	2007–2015; 2018–2024	456
2	(Switzerland)	Massimo Ceccaroni	1987–2002	452
3	(Switzerland)	Otto Demarmels	1967–1982	446
4	(Switzerland)	Jörg Stohler	1970–1984	425
5	(Switzerland)	Valentin Stocker	2008–2014; 2018–2022	416
6	(Switzerland)	Karl Odermatt	1963–1976	411
7	(Switzerland)	Taulant Xhaka	2010-2025	407
8	(Switzerland)	Erni Maissen	1975–1982; 1983–1987; 1989–1991	406
9	(Switzerland)	Benjamin Huggel	1998–2005; 2007–2012	401
10	(Australia)	Scott Chipperfield	2001–2012	385
11	(Switzerland)	Peter Ramseier	1966–1978	372
12	(Switzerland)	Werner Bopp	1944–1960	364
13	(Switzerland)	Josef Hügi	1948–1962	363

== Honours ==
FC Basel honours
Type	Competition	Titles	Seasons
Domestic	Swiss Super League	21	1952–53, 1966–67, 1968–69, 1969–70, 1971–72, 1972–73, 1976–77, 1979–80, 2001–02, 2003–04, 2004–05, 2007–08, 2009–10, 2010–11, 2011–12, 2012–13, 2013–14, 2014–15, 2015–16, 2016–17, 2024–25
Domestic	Swiss Cup	14	1932–33, 1946–47, 1962–63, 1966–67, 1974–75, 2001–02, 2002–03, 2006–07, 2007–08, 2009–10, 2011–12, 2016–17, 2018–19, 2024–25
Domestic	Swiss League Cup	1	1972

== European record ==
As of 18 May 2023.

Competition	Pld	W	D	L	GF	GA	GD	Win%
UEFA Champions League / European Cup	122	49	25	48	177	196	−19	40.16
UEFA Europa League / UEFA Cup	110	50	24	36	184	138	+46	45.45
UEFA Europa Conference League	34	18	8	8	62	40	+22	52.94
UEFA Cup Winners' Cup / European Cup Winners' Cup	4	0	1	3	3	13	−10	0.00
Inter-Cities Fairs Cup (Note: Does not include results from the first five editions of the Inter-Cities Fairs Cup featuring "Basel XI", which included players from FC Basel as well as players from other clubs (Basel XI record: P11 W1 D2 L8 F16 A39).)	10	1	1	8	3	13	−10	10.00
Total	266	109	57	100	398	383	+15	40.98

== Ownership ==
=== FC Basel Holding AG ===
The FC Basel Holding AG owns 75% of FC Basel 1893 AG and the other 25% is owned by the club FC Basel 1893 members. The club FC Basel 1893 functions as a base club independent of the holding company and the AG. FC Basel 1893 AG is responsible for the operational business of the club, e.g. the 1st team, a large part of the youth department and the back office are affiliated there. All decisions that affect the club FC Basel 1893 are made within the AG.

On 11 May 2021 the FC Basel Holding AG chairman Bernhard Burgener and board member David Degen announced a transfer of ownership rights, after months of massive fan protests. The new situation meant Degen owned 92% of the shares and about 8% is held by four small investors. At the AGM of FC Basel Holding AG on 15 June 2021, Bernhard Burgener, Peter von Büren and Karl Odermatt stood down from the board of directors. A new board of directors stood for election. From that date the board consisted of Reto Baumgartner (president), Dani Büchi (delegate of the board), David Degen (vice-president), Johannes Barth, Marco Gadola, Christian Gross, Sophie Herzog and Andreas Rey. Degen said he will sell a part of the shares within his management team.

On 18 August the Holding AG announced how the shares had been divided between the shareholders. Degen himself kept 40%, Andreas Rey held 18,41%, his wife Ursula Rey-Krayer also held 18,41%. A group of four other investors, these being Johannes Barth, Marco Gadola, Dani Büchi and Dan Holzmann, together held 15,14%. The other 8,04% of the shares remained by another group of investors, these being Manor AG, J. Safra Sarasin, Novasearch AG, MCH Group AG and Weitnauer Holding AG.

On 27 December 2021 an extraordinary AGM of the Holding AG was held and it was announced that the Board had reorganised itself. Ursula Rey-Krayer and Dan Holzmann were unanimously elected to the board of directors.

On 20 June 2022 the AGMs of both the FC Basel Holding AG and the FC Basel 1893 AG were held and both boards were confirmed. The Holding AG with following members: David Degen (president), Dan Holzmann, Ursula Rey-Krayer and Andreas Rey (vice-president). FC Basel 1893 AG with following members: David Degen (president), Carol Etter (delegate of the club FC Basel), Dan Holzmann, Ursula Rey-Krayer and Andreas Rey (vice-president).

=== Club management ===
The club's 127th AGM took place in written form, during the week from Saturday 5 June and Friday 11 June. The results were communicated on Monday 14 June. On 13 April 2021 the club announced their proposal for the club management. Club president Reto Baumgartner and the two directors, Dominik Donzé and Benno Kaiser, remained in the board and three new members were elected. These three being Carol Etter (sports lawyer), Edward Turner (financial specialist) and Tobias Adler (marketingspecialist). Their exact roles are to be decided. Carol Etter was elected as delegate of the board, to represent the club at the meetings of the Holding.

After the dismissal of Heiko Vogel, on 31 October 2023, the position of the sports director was left vacant, this until 15 May 2024 and then FCB announced that Daniel Stucki had been appointed as new sports director.

President	(Switzerland) Reto Baumgartner (to date)
Sports director	(Germany) Heiko Vogel until 31 October 2023
Sports director	(Switzerland) Daniel Stucki from 15 May 2024
Director	(Switzerland) Dominik Donzé (to date)
Director	(Switzerland) Benno Kaiser (to date)
Director	(Switzerland) Carol Etter (new)
Director	(Switzerland) Edward Turner (new)
Director	(Switzerland) Tobias Adler (new)
Ground (capacity and dimensions)	St. Jakob-Park (38,512) (37,500 for international matches) / 120x80 m)

Updated to match played 15 May 2024
Source: FCB Official Site

=== Team management ===
On 28 November 2022 FCB had announced that they had taken Heiko Vogel under contract as their new sporting director, as per 1 January 2023. After the end of their previous season, in which Vogel had taken over in charge of the coaching of their first team following the dismissal of Alexander Frei in February, Vogel continued in his role as sports director for this season.

On 12 May 2023 the club announced that Timo Schultz had been signed a contract as head coach of the new FCB first team. On 22 May they announced that the entire trainer staff had been appointed. Loïc Favé would join Davide Callà as assistant coach and Johannes Wieber would become athletic coach, Gabriel Wüthrich remained goalkeeper coach. On 23 May the club announced that the new coach of the U-21 is the ex-footballer Dennis Hediger, who had been the coach of the U-18 team the previous season. Appointed a his assistant coaches were Marco Aratore and Michaël Bauch.

On 29 September the club announced that they were parting with coach Schultz, together with his assistant Loïc Favé, and that he would be replaced by the current sport director Heiko Vogel. Vogel was dismissed a month later, with Fabio Celestini taking over until the end of the season. On 17 November 2023, Martin Rueda was hired as an additional assistant coach.

Position	Staff
Head coach	(Serbia) Slaviša Jokanović
Assistant coach	(Switzerland) Pascal Bader
Assistant coach	(Switzerland) Matthias Kohler
Assistant coach	(Switzerland) Luigi Nocentini
Assistant coach	(Switzerland) Uwe Grünwald from 31 October
Athletics coach	(Switzerland) Johannes Wieber
Goalkeeper coach	(Switzerland) Gabriel Wüthrich
Youth Team U-21 coach	(Switzerland) Dennis Hediger
Youth Team U-21 co-coach	(Switzerland) Marco Aratore
Youth Team U-21 co-coach	(Switzerland) Michaël Bauch

Source: FCB Official Site

== Players ==
=== Current squad ===
As of 8 September 2026

Note: Flags indicate national team as defined under FIFA eligibility rules; some limited exceptions apply. Players may hold more than one non-FIFA nationality.

No.	Pos.	Nation	Player
1	GK	SUI	Jonas Omlin
3	DF	SUI	Nicolas Vouilloz
4	DF	SUI	Bećir Omeragić
5	MF	BRA	Metinho
6	DF	JPN	Keigo Tsunemoto
7	FW	NGR	Philip Otele
8	MF	SWE	Ludwig Małachowski Thorell
9	FW	SLO	Žan Celar
10	MF	SUI	Xherdan Shaqiri (captain)
11	FW	BEL	Kazeem Olaigbe (on loan from Trabzonspor)
13	GK	SUI	Mirko Salvi
14	MF	SRB	Andrej Bačanin
17	FW	FRA	Aaron Malouda

No.	Pos.	Nation	Player
18	FW	ITA	Asane Sow
22	DF	FRA	Clément Michelin
24	DF	AUT	Flavius Daniliuc
25	DF	FRA	Coleen Louis
26	MF	GEO	Gabriel Sigua
27	DF	SUI	Kevin Rüegg
29	DF	FRA	Moussa Cissé
37	FW	SUI	Giacomo Koloto
44	MF	ITA	Jonas Harder
46	FW	BRA	Kaio Eduardo
48	GK	SUI	Bennett Hoch
49	GK	BRA	Renato
55	DF	NGR	Akpe Victory

==== Players out on loan ====
Note: Flags indicate national team as defined under FIFA eligibility rules; some limited exceptions apply. Players may hold more than one non-FIFA nationality.

No.	Pos.	Nation	Player
—	GK	SUI	Milo Minder (at Concordia Basel until 30 June 2027)
—	DF	SUI	Marvin Akahomen (at SC Kriens until 30 June 2027)
—	MF	GHA	Emmanuel Essiam (at Winterthur until 30 June 2027)
—	MF	KOS	Dion Kacuri (at Austria Lustenau until 30 June 2027)
—	FW	SUI	Albian Ajeti (at Lugano until 30 June 2027)
—	FW	GER	Moritz Broschinski (at Karlsruher SC until 30 June 2027)

No.	Pos.	Nation	Player
—	FW	ARG	Juan Gauto (at Platense until 31 December 2026)
—	FW	MKD	Muhamed Kurtishi (at FC Rapperswil-Jona until 30 June 2027)
—	FW	MAR	Ibrahim Salah (at Royal Antwerp until 30 June 2027)
—	FW	CRO	Marin Šotiček (at Hajduk Split until 30 June 2027)
—	FW	ESP	Cobel Sow García (at Stade Lausanne Ouchy until 30 June 2027)

==== Retired numbers ====
Note: Flags indicate national team as defined under FIFA eligibility rules; some limited exceptions apply. Players may hold more than one non-FIFA nationality.

No.	Pos.	Nation	Player
2	DF	SUI	Massimo Ceccaroni (1987–2002)
12	12		12th man (FCB-Fans)
20	MF	SUI	Fabian Frei (2007–2015, 2018–2024)
34	MF	ALB	Taulant Xhaka (2010–2012, 2013–2025)

=== Women's team ===
Since 2009 Basel have a women's team. It competes in the Nationalliga A.

=== Superleague Formula ===
FC Basel had a team in the Superleague Formula race car series where football teams lent their name to cars. GU-Racing International has operated the car for all seasons and Max Wissel has driven the car in all the races. FC Basel and Wissel won one race, in the 2009 season at Donington Park. The team have scored three other podiums in the series.

== Youth system ==
Basel operates a youth academy that has produced numerous players for the Swiss top-flight league. The development program focuses on integrating academy players into the first-team squad while maintaining a uniform training philosophy from the FE-14 to the U21 levels. Additionally, FCB's youth department follows its organizational charter and utilizes a dual system that combines athletic training with formal education to optimize its training.

The youth department has developed many Swiss internationals such as Erni Maissen, Adrian Knup, Alexander Frei, Marco Streller, Philipp, and David Degen. Since Basel moved into the St. Jakob-Park in 2001, they have strengthened their youth academy and many young talents like the Felipe Caicedo, Ivan Rakitić, Zdravko Kuzmanović, Xherdan Shaqiri, Yann Sommer, Eren Derdiyok, and Mohammed Salah have risen through the ranks there. In 2010 the former club president Gigi Oeri created the Stiftung Nachwuchs Campus Basel (in English foundation Youth Campus Basel) with the aim of continuously developing the club's youth division on a long-term basis.

Since 2001, more than 50 successful players have risen through the Basel youth system and joined their first team, including:

- (Ecuador) Felipe Caicedo
- (Switzerland) David Degen
- (Switzerland) Philipp Degen
- (Switzerland) Eren Derdiyok
- (Switzerland) Alexander Frei
- (Switzerland) Fabian Frei
- (Portugal) José Gonçalves
- (Switzerland) Gökhan Inler
- (Switzerland) Timm Klose
- (Switzerland) Breel Embolo
- (Switzerland) Cedric Itten
- (Serbia) Zdravko Kuzmanović
- (Croatia) Ivan Rakitić
- (Switzerland) Xherdan Shaqiri
- (Switzerland) Yann Sommer
- (Switzerland) Valentin Stocker
- (Switzerland) Albian Ajeti
- (Switzerland) Marco Streller
- (Switzerland) Granit Xhaka
- (Albania) Taulant Xhaka
- (Switzerland) Hakan Yakin
- (Switzerland) Noah Okafor

The youth academy is as present set up in the following areas: Formation (U-21, U-19, U-17, U1-6 and U-15), Footeco (FE-14) and Project Team Basel (FE-12 and FE-13).

=== Under-21 team ===
The eldest members are in the U-21 team. This team plays in the Swiss Promotion League, the third highest level in the Swiss football league system, behind the Super League and the Challenge League. A number of players have professional contracts and often train or play with the first team.

=== Current squad ===
As of 4 September 2025

Note: Flags indicate national team as defined under FIFA eligibility rules; some limited exceptions apply. Players may hold more than one non-FIFA nationality.

No.	Pos.	Nation	Player
—	GK	COD	Yohann Bopaka
—	GK	SUI	Simon Caillet
—	GK	SUI	Bennett Hoch
—	GK	BRA	Renato Widmer D'Autilia
—	DF	GHA	Daniel Theophilus Asiedu
—	DF	SUI	Sami Bashaj
—	DF	SUI	Erdin Ismaili
—	DF	SUI	Eliah Jordan
—	DF	SUI	Noah Makaya
—	DF	SUI	Louis Passavant
—	DF	SUI	Yannick Schweizer
—	DF	FRA	Evan Senaya
—	DF	GER	Kevin Tröndle
—	MF	SUI	Gjan Ajdin
—	MF	SUI	Gael Batadikio
—	MF	SUI	Noah Behringer

No.	Pos.	Nation	Player
—	MF	SUI	Luca Bühlmann
—	MF	SUI	Damjan Coric
—	MF	SUI	Axel Kuentz
—	MF	SUI	Adriano Onyegbule
—	MF	KOS	Gezim Pepsi
—	MF	SUI	Agon Rexhaj
—	MF	SUI	Moyo-Ola Uruejoma
—	MF	FRA	Melwane Zaidi
—	FW	SUI	Josip Bralic
—	FW	SUI	Jamal Camci
—	FW	POL	Michael Izunwanne
—	FW	FRA	Mahamadou Kanouté
—	FW	SUI	Giacomo Koloto
—	MF	ESP	Cobel Sow García
—	FW	SUI	Andrin Ulli

=== Under-19 team ===
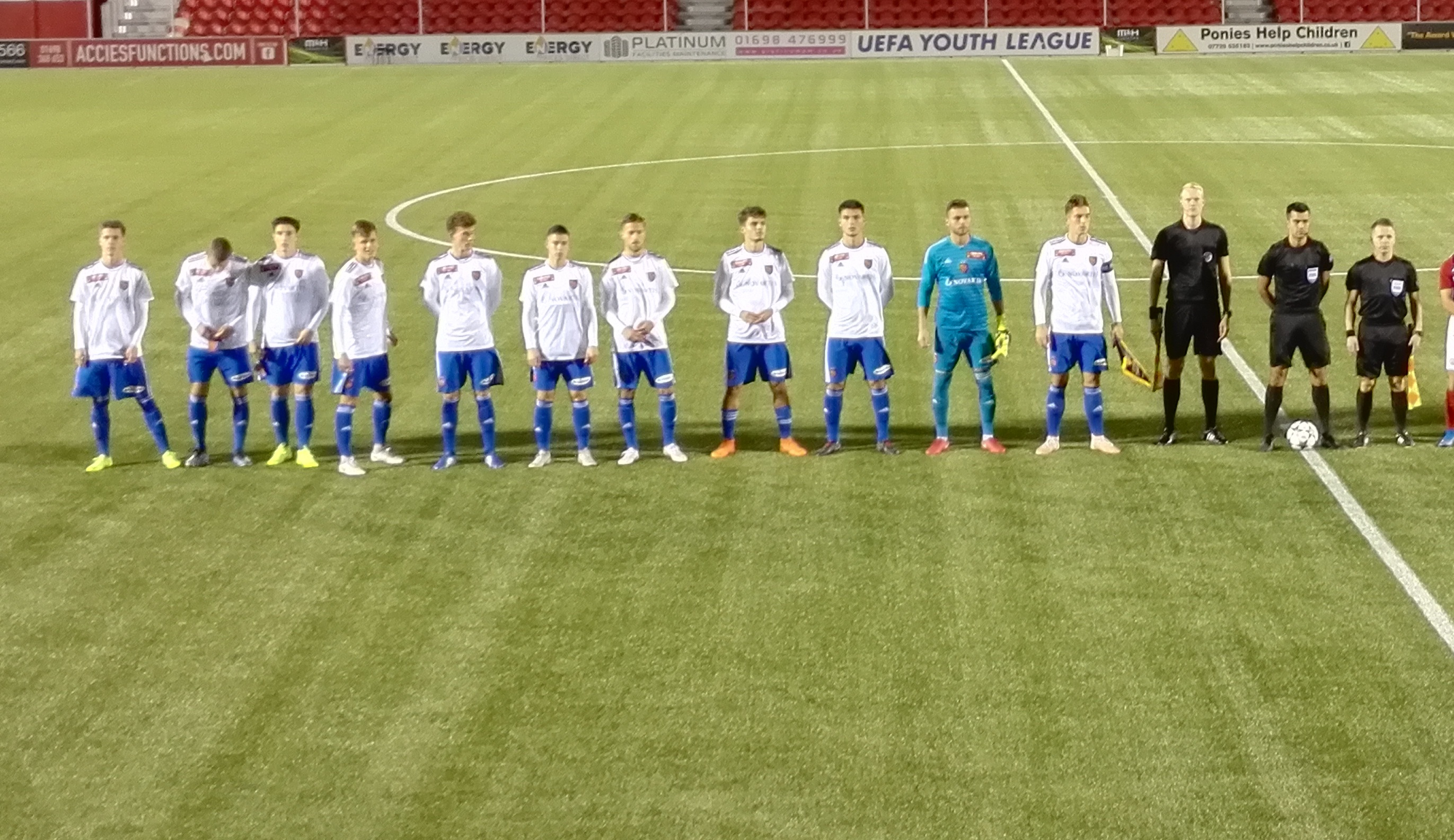
Basel Under-19s line up prior to their UEFA Youth League match away to Hamilton Accies, 2018.

Until 2023 there was no official Basel U-19 team, because a U-19 championship did not exist in Swiss football until then. Before then the team was quickly put together in the 2011–12 season from the youngest members of the first team, the younger Under-21 and the Under-18 teams who were eligible to play in the 2011–12 NextGen Series. Note: Results and dates can be found here 2011–12 NextGen series.

Because Basel qualified for the 2013–14 UEFA Champions League, the Under-19 team was again called to life and played in the 2013–14 UEFA Youth League. This time the members of this squad were solely members from the U-21 and U-18 teams, but the team only trained together once a week. Note: Results and dates can be found here 2013–14 UEFA Youth League.

A year later Basel qualified for the 2014–15 UEFA Champions League. Therefore, they were eligible to play in the 2014–15 UEFA Youth League and they took the matter a lot more seriously than the year before. Reserve team manager Thomas Häberli was also appointed as U-19 coach. Häberli's U-19 squad was still a mix between the younger U-21 and the older U-18 teams, but the team had training together virtually daily. This resulted with improved results, the team winning four games from their six, but failing to qualify for the knockout phase on tiebreak. Note: Results and dates can be found here 2014–15 UEFA Youth League.

Basel's first team qualified for the Champions League again in 2016–17, so the U-19 team was revived for the 2016–17 UEFA Youth League. Raphaël Wicky was U-19 coach. In the group stage they reached second position and advanced to the play-offs, but lost this against Rosenborg. Note: Results and dates can be found here 2016–17 UEFA Youth League.

By winning the U-18 Swiss championship at the end of the 2016–17 season the team qualified for the 2017–18 UEFA Youth League. Arjan Peço was the U-19 team coach at the time. The team were drawn into Group A which they won and advanced to the round of 16, but here they were eliminated by Atlético Madrid. Note: Results and dates can be found here 2017–18 UEFA Youth League.

At the end of the 2017–18 season the U-18 team coached by Alex Frei won the Swiss championship and qualified for the 2018–19 UEFA Youth League. But they were eliminated in the first round by Hamilton Academical, having drawn both matches 2–2, they were defeated in the penalty shoot-out. Note: Results and dates can be found here 2018–19 UEFA Youth League.

In November 2021, the Swiss Football Association announced their amendments to their league structure and further expanded their promotion of young talents. The Basel U-18 team won the championship 2022–23 and in line with the Associations new league structures, FCB advanced all their U-18 team members to their newly created U-19 team, who were thus qualified for the 2023–24 UEFA Youth League. Here the team, under coach Mario Cantaluppi, advanced through the qualification but were eliminated by Bayern Munich in the play-offs. Note: Results and dates can be found here 2023–24 UEFA Youth League.

=== Other youth teams ===
In total, the club has eight youth teams in their academy. In the group Formation are the U-21, U-19, U-17, U1-6 and U-15, in the group Footeco the FE-14 team and then there is the group Project Team Basel FE-12 and FE-13. Since the 2020–21 season, the FE-13 and FE-14 teams from the clubs FC Basel 1893, BSC Old Boys and FC Concordia Basel will appear with the addition of Team Basel.

== Employees of note ==
=== Former players ===
- (Australia) Scott Chipperfield

=== Coaches ===
NOTE: early history is largely unknown.

- (England) Percy Humphreys (1913–14)
- (Switzerland) Walter Dietrich (1919–22)
- (Germany) Max Breunig (1922–23)
- (Hungary) Gyula Kertész (1928–30)
- (Austria) Gustav Putzendopler (1930–32)
- (Austria) Otto Haftl (1932)
- (Austria) Karl Kurz (1932–33)
- (Austria) Josef Haist (1933–34)
- (Austria) Richard (Dombi) Kohn (1934)
- (Germany) Alwin Riemke (1934–36)
- (Austria) Heinz Körner (1936–37)
- (Switzerland) Fernand Jaccard (1937–39)
- (Switzerland) Walter Dietrich (1939)
- (Switzerland) Max Galler (1939–40)
- (Switzerland) Eugen Rupf (1940–43)
- (Switzerland) Willy Wolf (1943–46)
- (Switzerland) Max Barras (1946)
- (Austria) Anton Schall (1946–47)
- (Switzerland) Ernst Hufschmid (1947–52)
- (Switzerland) René Bader (1952–55)
- (Switzerland) Willy Dürr (1955)
- (Hungary) Béla Sárosi (1955–57)
- (Austria) Rudi Strittich (1957–58)
- (Switzerland) René Bader (1958–59)
- (Hungary) Jenő Vincze (1 July 1959 – 30 June 61)
- (Czechoslovakia) Georges Sobotka (1961–65)
- (West Germany) Helmut Benthaus (1 July 1965 – 30 June 82)
- (West Germany) Rainer Ohlhauser (1982–83)
- (West Germany) Ernst August Künnecke (1983–85)
- (Switzerland) Emil Müller (1985)
- (West Germany) Helmut Benthaus (1 July 1985 – 30 June 87)
- (Switzerland) Urs Siegenthaler (1 July 1987 – 30 June 90)
- (Germany) Ernst August Künnecke (1990–92)
- (Switzerland) Karl Odermatt and (Switzerland) Bruno Rahmen (1992)
- (Germany) Friedel Rausch (1 July 1992 – 30 June 93)
- (Switzerland) Claude Andrey (1993–95)
- (Switzerland) Karl Engel (1995–97)
- (Switzerland) Heinz Hermann (22 March 1997 – 31 March 97)
- (Italy) Salvatore Andracchio (interim), (1 April 1997 – 30 June 97)
- (Germany) Jörg Berger (1 July 1997 – 6 October 97)
- (Italy) Salvatore Andracchio (interim), (7 October 1997 – 31 December 97)
- (Switzerland) Guy Mathez (1 Jan 1998 – 14 May 99)
- (Switzerland) Marco Schällibaum (15 May 1999 – 14 June 99)
- (Switzerland) Christian Gross (15 June 1999 – 30 June 2009)
- (Germany) Thorsten Fink (1 July 2009 – 16 October 11)
- (Germany) Heiko Vogel (interim) (13 October 2011 – 11 December 11)
- (Germany) Heiko Vogel (12 December 2011 – 15 October 12)
- (Switzerland) Murat Yakin (15 October 2012 – 17 May 2014)
- (Portugal) Paulo Sousa (1 July 2014 – 17 June 2015)
- (Switzerland) Urs Fischer (18 June 2015 – 3 June 2017)
- (Switzerland) Raphaël Wicky (4 June 2017 – 26 July 2018)
- (Switzerland) Alexander Frei (interim) (26 July 2018 – 2 August 2018)
- (Switzerland) Marcel Koller (2 August 2018 – 31 August 2020)
- (Switzerland) Ciriaco Sforza (1 September 2020 – 6 April 2021)
- (Switzerland) Patrick Rahmen (6 April 2021 – 21 February 2022)
- (Spain) Guille Abascal (interim) (21 February 2022 – 23 May 2022)
- (Switzerland) Alex Frei (23 May 2022 – 7 February 2023)
- (Germany) Heiko Vogel (7 February 2023 – 31 October 2023)
- (Switzerland) Fabio Celestini (31 October 2023 – 13 June 2025)
- (Switzerland) Ludovic Magnin (16 June 2025 – 26 January 2026)
- (Switzerland) Stephan Lichtsteiner (26 January 2026 – present)

=== President ===
- Roland Geldner (1893–1896)
- Emanuel Schiess (1896–1896)
- Charlie Volderauer (1896–1899)
- Ernst-Alfred Thalmann ( 1900–1901)
- Emanuel Schiess (1901–1902)
- Ernst-Alfred Thalmann (1902–1902)
- Josy Ebinger (1902–1903)
- Ernst-Alfred Thalmann (1903–1907)
- Siegfried Pfeiffer (1907–1908)
- Ernst-Alfred Thalmann (1908–1913)
- Karl Ibach (1913–1913)
- Carl Albert Hintermann (1913–1914)
- Ernst-Alfred Thalmann (1914–1915)
- Philipp Leichner (1915–1915)
- Franz Rinderer (1915–1918)
- August Rossa (1918–1919)
- Bernard Klingelfuss (1919–1920)
- Franz Rinderer (1920–1921)
- Carl Burkhardt (1921–1922)
- Karl Ibach (1922–1925)
- Carl Burkhardt (1925–1926)
- Franz Rinderer (1926–1927)
- Karl Ibach (1927–1927)
- Karl Junker (1927–1927)
- Hans Rupprecht (1927–1929)
- Otto Kuhn (1929–1931)
- Franz Rinderer (1931–1936)
- Emil Junker (1936–1939)
- Albert Besse (1939–1944)
- Emil Junker (1944–1946)
- Jules Düblin (1946–1959)
- Ernst Weber (1959–1962)
- Lucien Schmidlin (1962–1966)
- Harry Thommen (1966–1970)
- Félix Musfeld (1970–1976)
- René Theler (1976–1980)
- Pierre Jacques Lieblich (1980–1982)
- Roland Rasi (1982–1983)
- Urs Gribi (1983–1986)
- Peter Max Sutter (1986–1987)
- Charles Röthlisberger (1987–1992)
- Peter Epting (1992–1996)
- René C. Jäggi (1996–2002)
- Werner Edelmann (2002–2006)
- Gisela Oeri (2006–2011)
- Bernhard Heusler (2012–2017)
- Bernhard Burgener (2017–2020)
- Reto Baumgartner (2020–)

At the club's Extraordinary General Assembly on 16 January 2012, the 601 attending members appointed Oeri as honorary president.

== See also ==
- History of FC Basel
- List of FC Basel players
- List of FC Basel seasons
- Football in Switzerland
- The Football Club Social Alliance

== Notes and references ==
=== Notes ===
1. Following the 2001–02 season, the club retired the number of Massimo Ceccaroni, a Basel native who played his entire senior career with Basel, between 1987 and 2002.
2. The number 12 in the Basel squad became vacant on 1 July 2008. In October of that year, the board of managing directors announced their decision to dedicate this number to their fans.
