= Archie Ogden =

English cricketer (born 1994)

Personal information
- Full name: Archie Ogden
- Born: 24 February 1994 (age 32); Rotherham, South Yorkshire
- Batting: Left-handed
- Bowling: Left-arm medium-fast

Domestic team information
- Years: Team
- 2016: Leeds/Bradford MCCU
- FC debut: 31 March 2016 Leeds/Bradford MCCU v Warwickshire

Career statistics
Competition	First-class
Matches	2
Runs scored	24
Batting average	24.00
100s/50s	0/0
Top score	24
Balls bowled	223
Wickets	4
Bowling average	43.00
5 wickets in innings	0
10 wickets in match	0
Best bowling	2/80
Catches/stumpings	0/–
- Source: Cricinfo, 7 April 2016

Archie Ogden (born 24 February 1994) is an English cricketer. He is a left-handed batsman and a left-arm medium-fast bowler. He made his first-class debut for Leeds/Bradford MCCU against Warwickshire on 31 March 2016.
