= 2021–22 FC Basel season =

FC Basel
2021–22 season
- Owner: FCB Holding; David Degen
- Club president: Reto Baumgartner
- Head coach: Patrick Rahmen
- Ground: St. Jakob-Park
- Swiss Super League: 2nd
- Swiss Cup: Third round
- UEFA Europa Conference League: Round of 16
- Top goalscorer: League: Arthur Cabral (14); All: Arthur Cabral (27)
Home colours	Away colours	Third colours

The 2021–22 season was FC Basel's 128th season in their existence and the club's 27th consecutive season in the top flight of Swiss football since their promotion in the 1993–94 season. The 2021–22 Swiss Super League season started on the weekend 24 to 25 July 2021 and ended on 21 May 2022. In addition to the Swiss Super League, Basel also participated in this season's edition of the Swiss Cup, starting in the third round. Basel also qualified for the inaugural edition of the UEFA Europa Conference League, beginning play in the second qualifying round.

== Club ==
=== FC Basel Holding AG ===
The FC Basel Holding AG owns 75% of FC Basel 1893 AG and the other 25% is owned by the club FC Basel 1893 members. The club FC Basel 1893 functions as a base club independent of the holding company and the AG. FC Basel 1893 AG is responsible for the operational business of the club, e.g. the 1st team, a large part of the youth department and the back office are affiliated there. All decisions that affect the club FC Basel 1893 are made within the AG.

On 11 May 2021 the FC Basel Holding AG chairman Bernhard Burgener and board member David Degen announced a transfer of ownership rights, after months of massive fan protests. The new situation meant Degen owned 92% of the shares and about 8% is held by four small investors. At the AGM of FC Basel Holding AG on June 15, 2021, Bernhard Burgener, Peter von Büren and Karl Odermatt stood down from the board of directors. A new board of directors stood for election. From that date the board consisted of Reto Baumgartner (president), Dani Büchi (delegate of the board), David Degen (vice-president), Johannes Barth, Marco Gadola, Christian Gross, Sophie Herzog and Andreas Rey. Degen said he will sell a part of the shares within his management team.

On the 18 August the Holding AG announced how the shares had been divided between the shareholders. Degen himself kept 40%, Andreas Rey held 18,41%, his wife Ursula Rey-Krayer also held 18,41%. A group of four other investors, these being Johannes Barth, Marco Gadola, Dani Büchi and Dan Holzmann, together held 15,14%. The other 8,04% of the shares remained by another group of investors, these being Manor AG, J. Safra Sarasin, Novasearch AG, MCH Group AG and Weitnauer Holding AG.

On 27 December 2021 an extraordinary AGM of the Holding AG was held and it was announced that the Board had reorganised itself. Ursula Rey-Krayer and Dan Holzmann were unanimously elected to the board of directors. At the same time, Sophie Herzog, Christian Gross, Johannes Barth and Reto Baumgartner resigned from the Board and were to focus upon their duties as members of the Board of Directors of FC Basel 1893 AG.

Since that date the new Board of the FC Basel Holding AG consists of the following members: David Degen (president), Dani Büchi (delegate of the board), Marco Gadola, Dan Holzmann, Ursula Rey-Krayer and Andreas Rey (vice-president). With the meeting FC Basel Holding AG had an adjusted composition - the FCB shareholders were represented upon the Board of Directors of FC Basel Holding AG by those with the overall largest proportion.

The Board of Directors of the FC Basel 1893 AG as it was announced in June 2021: Reto Baumgartner, (president), Johannes Barth. David Degen (vice-president), Carol Etter (delegate of the club), Marco Gadola, Christian Gross, Sophie Herzog and Andreas Rey.

=== Club management ===
The club's 127th AGM is due to take place in written form, during the week from Saturday 5 June and Friday 11 June. The results were communicated on Monday 14 June. On 13 April 2021 the club announced their proposal for the club management. Club chairman Reto Baumgartner and the two directors, Dominik Donzé and Benno Kaiser, remained in the board and three new members were elected. These three being Carol Etter (sports lawyer), Edward Turner (financial specialist) and Tobias Adler (marketingspecialist). Their exact roles are to be decided. Carol Etter was elected as delegate of the board, to represent the club at the meetings of the Holding.

Club chairman	(Switzerland) Reto Baumgartner (to date)
Director	(Switzerland) Dominik Donzé (to date)
Director	(Switzerland) Benno Kaiser (to date)
Director	(Switzerland) Carol Etter (new)
Director	(Switzerland) Edward Turner (new)
Director	(Switzerland) Tobias Adler (new)
Ground (capacity and dimensions)	St. Jakob-Park (38,512 (37,500 for international matches) / 120x80 m)

Updated to match played 18 November 2020
Source: FCB Official Site

=== Team management ===
On 20 May 2021 the club announced that Patrick Rahmen had signed a new contract that made him head coach of the new FCB first team. Since 6 April he had been interim coach. Assistant coach Ognjen Zaric also prolonged his contract for the new season. Massimo Colomba stayed with the club as Goalkeeper Coach. On 15 June 2021 the club announced, that Michael Silberbauer had been hired on a deal for the 2021–22 season, as the club's new assistant coach under head coach Rahmen.

Youth coach Matthias Kohler was trainer of the U-21, but he left the club on 8 June 2021. He was replaced by Marco Schällibaum. Schällibaum continued with the two existing assistants, Daniel Stucki and Michaël Bauch.

Position	Staff
Manager	(Switzerland) Patrick Rahmen
Assistant coach	(Denmark) Michael Silberbauer
Assistant coach	(Switzerland) Ognjen Zaric
Goalkeeper coach	(Switzerland) Massimo Colomba
Team leader	(Switzerland) Gustav Nussbaumer
Youth Team U-21 coach	(Switzerland) Marco Schällibaum
Youth Team U-21 co-coach	(Switzerland) Daniel Stucki
Youth Team U-21 co-coach	(Switzerland) Michaël Bauch

Source: FCB Official Site

The club announced on 31 December, that the contract with head coach Patrick Rahmen had been extended for a further year until summer 2023. Jointly the club and Rahmen had decided to sign on Boris Smiljanic as new assistant coach. The 32-year-old Spaniard Guillermo Abascal also joined the coaching team and work together with Ognjen Zaric as special coach. It was also announced that Michael Silberbauer had left the club by mutual agreement.

Following a number of bad results for the U-21 team, on 30 November the club had announced that with immediate effect FC Basel 1893 and its U-21 coach Marco Schällibaum had separated. On 3 January 2022 FCB announced that they had signed Michel Renggli as new coach for their U-21 team.

Position	Staff
Manager	(Switzerland) Patrick Rahmen
Assistant coach	(Switzerland) Boris Smiljanic
Special coach	(Switzerland) Ognjen Zaric
Special coach	(Spain) Guillermo Abascal
Goalkeeper coach	(Switzerland) Massimo Colomba
Team leader	(Switzerland) Gustav Nussbaumer
Youth Team U-21 coach	(Switzerland) Michel Renggli
Youth Team U-21 co-coach	(Switzerland) Daniel Stucki
Youth Team U-21 co-coach	(Switzerland) Michaël Bauch

Source: FCB Official Site

On 21 February the club announced that the contract with Patrick Rahmen had been terminated, due to "unsatisfactory sportive development of the team and lack of clear perspective". He was replaced by Guillermo Abascal, who was to act as coach ad interim. Furthermore, the club announced that assistant coach Boris Smiljanic had asked for his contract to be dissolved, for personal reasons. He was replaced by Marco Walker, who had last been head coach for FC Sion.

Position	Staff
Manager	(Spain) Guillermo Abascal
Assistant coach	(Switzerland) Marco Walker
Special coach	(Switzerland) Ognjen Zaric
Goalkeeper coach	(Switzerland) Massimo Colomba
Team leader	(Switzerland) Gustav Nussbaumer
Youth Team U-21 coach	(Switzerland) Michel Renggli
Youth Team U-21 co-coach	(Switzerland) Daniel Stucki
Youth Team U-21 co-coach	(Switzerland) Michaël Bauch

Source: FCB Official Site

== Overview ==
=== Off and pre-season ===
On the day after the last match of the previous season, 22 May 2021, the club announced a number of changes in their first team squad. Per 30 June 2021 the contracts of Luca Zuffi, Aldo Kalulu, Jasper van der Werff, Elis Isufi and Jozef Pukaj will expire and will not be renewed. In addition, the purchase options in the loan contracts will not drawn for Timm Klose, Amir Abrashi and Jorge Marco de Oliveira Moraes.

Between the years 2014 and 2021 Luca Zuffi played seven seasons for Basel in a total of 327 games scoring a total of 40 goals. Exactly 200 of these games were in the Swiss Super League, 22 in the Swiss Cup, 30 in the UEFA Champions League, 19 in the UEFA Europa League and 56 were friendly games. He scored 27 goals in the domestic league, two in the domestic cup, four in the Champions League, three in the Europa League and the other four were scored during the test games. With the club, Zuffi won the championship three times and the Swiss Cup twice. The return of Klose to his club of origin was sportingly not a lucky one. Klose could not bring the sporting performance that had been expected. In his one season with the club Klose played a total of 37 games for Basel scoring a total of two goals. 28 of these games were in the Swiss Super League, one in the Swiss Cup and eight were friendly games. He scored both his goals in the domestic league. During the home match on 16 December 2020 against Young Boys Jorge had been injured and had to be substituted out in the 62nd minute. The injury turned out to be difficult and required an oppration and this put him out for the rest of the season. In his one season with the club Jorge played a total of seven games for Basel without scoring a goal. Five of these games were in the Nationalliga A and two were friendly games.

On 2 June the club announced that Julian Von Moos would be loaned out SBV Vitesse for the season with an option for a definite move. Vitesse play in the highest tier of Dutch football, the Eredivisie.

In the other direction, on 17 June FCB announced that Spanish player Jordi Quintillà had signed in on a free-transfer from St. Gallen. Basel also signed the Spanish-German right back Sergio López from Real Madrid. The youngster had played in Real's second team and, during the last season, had been loaned out to Real Valladolid and had played in their second team. Basel also signed the youngster Yacouba Nasser Djiga from Vitesse FC in Burkina-Faso.

On 18 June FCB announced their programme for the pre-season. The trainings began on 21 June, on the 24 June they began their trainings camp in Crans-Montana with the first test game on 27 June against Thun in Lens, Valais. On 1 July a second test game against Dynamo Kyiv in Vevey. The team would then return to Basel and play a further three test games. These being against Grasshopper Club on 6 July on the Youth Campus Basel grounds in Münchenstein, against RC Strasbourg Alsace in Colmar on 9 July and another game in the Youth Campus Basel against Aarau one day later on 10 July. Basel played their seventh and final pre-season friendly against Hamburger SV in their home stadium Volksparkstadion on 17 July.

On the last day of the summer transfer window the club were very active on the transfer front. That evening the club announced the signing of Tomás Tavares, who signed in on loan from Benfica, Dan Ndoye who came on loan from Nice, Joelson Fernandes on loan from Sporting and finally Wouter Burger who transferred in from Feyenoord.

=== Winter break ===
Not only was there a large amount of movement on the transfer market during the summer, but also during the winter break transfer window.

Julian Von Moos's loan to SBV Vitesse was ended and he transferred definitive to St. Gallen. After only six months with the club Jordi Quintillà left the squad and returned to his previous club St. Gallen. Gonçalo Cardoso's loan period from West Ham came to an end. Adrian Durrer transferred to Lugano. Afimico Pululu transferred to Greuther Fürth. The two youngsters Tician Tushi and Carmine Chiappetta were loaned out to Winterthur until 30 June 2022, so that they could obtain more playing time.

Eray Cömert transferred out and joined Valencia. Cömert had come through Basel's youth system and since he had advanced to the first team in 2016, he had played a total of 167 games for Basel scoring a total of 8 goals. 101 of these games were in the Swiss Super League, 9 in the Swiss Cup, 30 in the European competitions (Champions, Europa and Conference League) and 27 were friendly games. He scored 5 goals in the domestic league, 2 in the European competitions and the other was scored during the friendlies.

Edon Zhegrova transferred out and signed for French team Lille OSC for undisclosed fee. During his three years with the club from January 2019 to January 2022 Zhegrova played a total of 89 games for Basel scoring a total of 15 goals. 60 of these games were in the Swiss Super League, 3 in the Swiss Cup, 11 in the Europa League and Conference League and 15 were friendly games. He scored 9 goals in the domestic league, 2 in the Conference League and the other 4 were scored during the test games.

The most significant transfer was that of top-scorer Arthur Cabral to Fiorentina. In his two and a half years with the club Cabral had a total of 118 appearances for Basel scoring a total of 75 goals. 77 of these games were in the Super League, 3 in the Swiss Cup, 26 in the European competitions and 12 were test matches. He scored 46 goals in the domestic league, 2 in the cup, 17 in the European competitions and the other 10 were scored during the tests.

A number of players joined the FCB squad during the winter break. Emmanuel Essiam from Berekum Chelsea. Albian Hajdari returned to FCB on loan from Juventus. In the press-release on 18 January, Basel announced that Noah Katterbach, from 1. FC Köln, had signed a one calendar year loan contract with them which included the option of a definitive transfer. Fyodor Chalov came in on a six-month loan from CSKA Moscow.

== The Campaign ==
=== Domestic League ===
The 2021–22 Swiss Super League season started on the weekend of 24 to 25 July 2021 and will end on 21 May 2022. Basel's first game was an away game against the newly promoted Grasshopper Club and this was won 2–0, the goals coming as an own goal from Leonardo Campana and the second from Sebastiano Esposito. In the second matchday Basel faced Sion at home and won 6–1, with six different goal scorers, Pajtim Kasami, Sergio López, Eray Cömert, Sebastiano Esposito, Arthur Cabral and Edon Zhegrova. The third matchday gave Basel another home game against Servette. This was won 5–1. Cabral scored four of these and Esposito the other.

=== Domestic Cup ===
Basel also participated in 2021–22 Swiss Cup and they started in the first round which took place on the week-end 14/15 August 2021, the final will take place on 5 May 2022. Basel's aim for this competition was to win it. In the first round, teams from the Super League and Challenge League were seeded and could not play against each other. In a match, the home advantage was granted to the team from the lower league, if applicable. Basel were drawn against FC Schönenwerd-Niedergösgen.

Schönenwerd-Niedergösgen (15 August 2021)

Basel's first opponents were the fifth tier team FC Schönenwerd-Niedergösgen. The game was played at Sportplatz Inseli, in Niedergösgen and the attendance was 2,254 fans, which meant that the Sportpaltz was sold out. As head coach Patrick Rahmen had announced in advance, he made changes in the starting line-up for the cup game. Thus Đorđe Nikolić, Gonçalo Cardoso, Adrian Durrer and Tician Tushi came to their first appearances this season. Also Kaly Sene and Liam Millar were in the starting line-up for the very first time. Taulant Xhaka led the team as captain. In the first few minutes, the amateurs made it clear that they were not willing to distribute gifts and they quickly put the player leading the ball under pressure. However, the visitors soon took dictation of the game and were twice unlucky as a shot bounced back from the goal post shots during the first quarter of an hour. In the 20th minute the ball landed in the goal for the first time and by the end the result was clear. There were six different goal scorers as Basel won 7–0, Tician Tushi scored twice and the players Raoul Petretta, Matías Palacios, Darian Males and Kaly Sene each scored once, the other goal was an own goal.

Rorschach-Goldach (19 September 2021)

In the second round Basel were again drawn away from home against another fifth tier team, this time FC Rorschach-Goldach. The game was played on 19 September, the goal scorers here were Liam Millar, Taulant Xhaka and Matías Palacios and Basel won 3–0 to advance to the next round.

Étoile Carouge (27 October 2021)

In the third round Basel were drawn against third tier Étoile Carouge. The game was played on 27 October in the Stade de la Fontenette. The team from the Promotion League played a game on par with FCB and earned their qualification for the quarter-finals. Romain Kursner scored the only goal of the game shortly after the start of the second half. A brief rallying period by the guests had no consequences and the longer the game lasted, the more often their attacks got stuck in the defense of the home team. And so nothing changed in the result until the final whistle. Basel suffered a 0–1 defeat and were eliminated from the cup.

Conclusion

Basel were eliminated from the cup with this frustrating result and thus did not achieve their aim. It was not only disappointing following last season's quick dismissal by lower-tier team Winterthur, it was also very annoying because other strongly rated teams had also already been eliminated, such as Young Boys, a round earlier, but also Zürich, Servette and Grasshoppers had failed to reach the quarter-finals.

=== Europa Conference League ===
Basel were qualified for the newly created 2021–22 UEFA Europa Conference League and they started in the second qualifying round. The draw was held on 16 June 2021 and the first leg matches took place on 22 July 2021 and the return leg was played one week later on 29 July. Basel were drawn against the winners of the match between Sfîntul Gheorghe and Partizani, which the Albanien team decided for themselves.

==== Qualifying rounds ====
Partizani (22 July 2021)

The first leg of the second qualifying round tie was held at the St. Jakob-Park in front of an attendance of 6,095 fans. Referee was Dennis Higler of the Royal Dutch Football Association and he reported an excellent pitch on this warm and clear evening. FCB started well, with swing, and put Partizani under pressure. They settled into the opposing half of the pitch for about the first 20 minutes. Subsequently, however, they slackened and the game became more balanced. During a phase in which the Basel team seemed to operate helpless, the first goal fell for the hosts. Arthur Cabral with a good cross and then Darian Males headed the ball into the centre making it easy for Valentin Stocker to score with a header from very close range shortly before the break. The undisputed highlight of the match was Arthur Cabral's 2–0 in the 52nd minute. The Brazilian goal getter picked up a long, diagonal ball from Fabian Frei in the penalty area with his back to the goal. He lifted the ball on his knee and this high enough for him to perform an overhead kick. It was not just an attempt. The ball slammed with force into the goal. On 80 minutes Michael Lang played a cross and Cabral gave the assist as Stocker side footed the ball in to make it three. A few minutes later, Edon Zhegrova had another chance, but his shot rebounded from the post and so 3–0 was the final score.

Return match (29 July 2021)

The second leg was played at the Elbasan Arena in Elbasan with an attendance of 950 fans. The referee was Gergő Bogár of the Hungarian Football Federation and he reported a soft pitch on a clear evening with 35 °C. Basel started well into the game and dominated their opponents Partizani. Up until the opening goal, it had only been FCB that created good chances. Edon Zhegrova hit the post after 17 minutes, from the edge of the penalty area, and a little later the Basel team almost took advantage of a serious defensive error. The superiority of the FCB team was evident over the entire 90 minutes. Shortly before the break, Valentin Stocker scored the opener as he dusted off after an insufficiently cleared shot from Arthur Cabral. Cabral doubled up on 49 minutes. Subsequently, the Basel team did not run into any risk of missing the qualification to the next round. A quarter of an hour before the end, the hosts also had their first good chance at goal, but Stênio Júnior's shot was too weak and it was a safe prey for keeper Heinz Lindner. Partizani had their best chance of achieving a consolation goal in stoppage time, as two men appeared alone in front of Lindner, but they failed to get the ball into the goal and the score remained 2–0 for the visitors.

Újpest (5 August 2021)

In the penultimate qualifying round, Basel faced the traditional club Újpest Budapest. The Hungarians had prevailed against Vaduz with a 2–1 in the first leg and with a 3–1 in the Rheinpark Stadion in Vaduz. The first leg took place in Szusza Ferenc Stadion in Budapest with an attendance of 2,367 fans. The arbitrator was Jérôme Brisard of the French Football Federation and he reported a damp pitch on this partially cloudy evening. FCB was the better team in terms of play and with the technically stronger players and this remained evident throughout the game. Only, they had a hard time with the physically robust hosts, who quickly switched to offensive play after Basel lost the ball. The mistakes in the Basel midfield led to dangerous chances for Újpest, especially in the starting quarter of an hour. Their first chance on six minutes, Branko Pauljević caught a loose ball, prevailed into the box, but his shot rebounded from the post. On 10 minutes an error by Pajtim Kasami and Újpest's French playmaker Yohan Croizet bent a ball from 20 meters goalwards, but keeper Heinz Lindner pushed the ball over. A bad pass by Matias Palacios was intercepted by Vincent Onovo, a fine long ball allowed Croizet to achieve the hosts goal five minutes before half-time. But Basel managed to turn this 0–1 into a 2–1 despite a performance with many shortcomings. Arthur Cabral scored in the 55th minute with his head to equalize after an opponent had involuntarily passed the ball on to him. And in the 74th minute, the Brazilian delivered the pass to Darian Males who made it 2–1, although he was probably in an offside position.

Return match (12 August 2021)

In the second leg the St. Jakob-Park had an attendance of 12,337 people and referee was Yigal Frid from the Israel Football Association. Coach Patrick Rahmen's team started well into play against their opponents Újpest. Because Edon Zhegrova was injured, Darian Males played on the right wing in the starting formation and he thanked his coach for his nomination with the first goal to the 1–0 lead. This goal he scored from close range with a direct volley after a cross from Sebastiano Esposito. The 2–0 in stoppage time at the end of first half was stuck with the blemish that goal scorer Valentin Stocker had pushed his opponent in the back. The goal would most likely have been cancelled if UEFA had used the VAR in European Cup qualifiers. In the second half, Basel's goalkeeper Heinz Linder had to show a great save against a player who ran unmarked against him. In the 71st minute Esposito fabulously prepared a chance from the left and Arthur Cabral solely had to push the ball home to make it 3–0. Substitute full-back Raoul Petretta ended the scoring with the 4–0 in the 90th minute. Without any effort and with another convincing performance, Basel reached the playoffs in the Conference League.

Hammarby (19 August 2021)

The draw for the play-offs gave Basel a tie against Hammarby IF. The team from Stockholm were the current Swedish cup winners. The first leg was played in the St. Jakob-Park in front of an attendance of 12,144 fans and referee in charge of the game was Sergey Ivanov of the Russian Football Union. Thanks to two late goals and a total of three strikes from the irrepressible goal getter Arthur Cabral, Basel won the first leg against Hammarby 3–1. Coach Patrick Rahmen's team was nowhere near as irresistible as they had been in all previous home games of the season. Especially in the second half, the Swedes did not have much trouble controlling the match and did not give Basel any scoring chances for the longest of times. Cabral first scored with a header after half an hour. Sebastiano Esposito circled the free kick from the side on to Cabral's head. The Italian teenager, on loan from Inter Milan, was, along with Cabral, the biggest Basel asset - and almost the only asset for a long time in this match. The Swedes equalized through Abdul Khalili after 71 minutes, as the Basel defence failed to clear the ball from the box after a high cross. When there was hardly any indication of further goals, suddenly the Brazilian stricker was successful with a well-placed shot after 86 minutes and then again from a hands penalty after 89 minutes.

Return match (26 August 2021)

The Tele2 Arena in Stockholm with an attendance of 7,855 fans was the location where referee Bobby Madden of the Scottish Football Association blew his whistle for the second leg between Hammarby and Basel. Both teams started slow and spent more than a quarter of an hour watch things pass. In fact, the entire first half was played mostly in the midfield area. The Basler had shown and needed nerves, especially after the break, when they let Hammarby IF catch up on the two-goal deficit of the first leg within six minutes. The Icelandic central defender Jón Fjóluson was first successful with a header in the 48th minute and then he increased to 2–0 on 54 minutes with a long-range shot from around 20 meters that was slightly deflected by Cabral. Basel then caught themselves and took control of the match. In extra time Hammarby, contrary to the course of the game and from an alleged offside position by Aziz Ouattara they took the lead 3–0 in the 101st minute. Basel then showed a strong reaction eight minutes later, substitute Afimico Pululu could only be stopped by his opponent with a foul in the penalty area. This enabled Cabral to score from the spot. In the penalty shootout Cabral took the responsibility, as the last marksman he converted the decisive spot-kick and became match winner for the FCB, who won 4–3 after the penalty shootout.

==== Group stage ====
The draw for the group stage was held on 27 August 2021. Basel were seeded into pot 1. Basel were drawn into group H together with Qarabağ from Azerbaijan, Kairat from Almaty in Kazakhstan and Omonia from Nicosia in Cyprus.

The club Qarabağ FK originates from Aghdam, but has not played in its hometown since 1993 due to the First Nagorno-Karabakh War. The club is now based in the capital city of Baku. They qualified for the Conference League by being runners-up in their domestic league. The previous season FC Kairat were 2020 Kazakhstan Premier League champions and had been qualified for the Champions League. After being defeated they were relegated to the Europa League and following defeat in the third qualifying round transferred to the Conference League. The same fate from the Champions League/Europa League/Conference League had occurred to AC Omonia after they became 2020–21 Cypriot First Division champions.

Qarabağ (16 September 2021)

After a 7-hour flight over about 4,400 Kilometres, the Basel team and staff arrived in Baku. On matchday 1 of the group stage Qarabağ played hosts to Basel. Qarabağ played this home match at Baku Olympic Stadium, capacity 68,000, instead of their regular stadium Azersun Arena, with has a capacity of 5,800 and which did not meet UEFA requirements. The attendance for this match was 17,586 fans. The referee was Erik Lambrechts from the Royal Belgian Football Association. Both teams started slow into the match and evaluated each other. Basel were unable to dictate play as desired for most of the game, so they rarely had dangerous actions. Raoul Petretta missed the best opportunity shortly before the break. The full-back failed with his shot from an acute angle on Karabach's goalie Shahrudin Mahammadaliyev. The reason why FCB reached a goalless draw was due not only to their clever defensive play, but also due to their opponents’ lushness. Qarabağ combined well, but lacked determination of purpose. Until the final minutes they had made nothing of their superiority except half-chances. Goalie Heinz Lindner was only challenged in the 84th and 94th minute. The Austrian keeper parried twice, first a shot and then a header.

Kairat (30 September 2021)

Matchday 2 and Basel were hosts to Kairat. St. Jakob-Park had an attendance of 8,712 fans and referee Stuart Attwell from the FA reported an excellent pitch. Basel started well into the match, dominated their opponents from the beginning and it was no surprise as Arthur Cabral put them into the lead after 15 minutes. A long ball to the far post, Liam Millar headed the ball into the goal mouth and Cabral headed home. Just six minutes later Michael Lang added a second, Pajtim Kasami headed a corner against the crossbar and Lang netted the rebound. On 40 minutes a corner is cleared too short by the Kairat defence, and the ball is returned to the centre and Lang doubled his personal tally. They could have made it four before the break, but Fabian Frei's long-range effort landed on the top of the net. Three minutes after the break a good move from the centre midfield to Basel's left, Matías Palacios to Tomás Tavares and his low cross is side footed into the net by Dan Ndoye. Basel with the four-goal lead reduced tempo and Kairat took advantage, Kairat top-scorer José Kanté in the 65th and Ricardo Alves per penalty in the 69th reduced the advantage. Basel let the game run off and the end score 4–2 left a clear explanation of the happenings.

Omonoia (21 October 2021)

Basel were hosts to Omonia on matchday 3 of the group stage. The St. Jakob-Park had an attendance of 10,056 fans and they saw both teams starting well into game. Basel then gained themselves an advantage and on 18 minutes Pajtim Kasami forced his way to the right almost to the by-line and hit the post with his shot from an acute angle. The ball rebounded back into the box where Liam Miller acted quickly and scored. Basel had things under control from then. However, Omonia remained unpredictable and as Marko Scepovic advanced down the left and entered into the penalty-box he was brought to fall. Referee Ms Stéphanie Frappart of the French Football Federation awarded the visitors a spot-kick, which Jordi Gómez converted straight down the middle on 26 minutes. On 40 minutes a handball inside the visitors’ box, again the whistle and this time Arthur Cabral converted to put the hosts back in front. In the second half, the Basel team created various good chances to increase the result. Darian Males narrowly failed, while substitute Matias Palacios hit the crossbar via the goalkeeper's fist. With one exception, they did not allow any dangers with their defensive actions and they held everything under control. Edon Zhegrova clarified all matters with the 3–1 after a counterattack in the 88th minute.

Omonia FC (4 November 2021)

The GSP Stadium in Nicosia is the largest stadium in Cyprus and has a capacity of 22,859. However, on matchday 4 the attendance was just 4,597 fans as Omonia played hosts to Basel. The visitors determined the rhythm of play, but kept it low and thus gave the advantage to Omonia's defensive work. In the first counterattack of the game in the 16th minute, Eray Cömert was duped by striker Andronikos Kakoullis, who scored from 10 meters out. Basel continued to dominate, but they made a largely unexciting performance. After the break head coach brought Matías Palacios and Darian Males into play and then the team found access to the game. A decisive move came in the 57th minute. First Tomas Tavares knocked over his opponent in the penalty area, but referee Vitali Meshkov of the Russian Football Union correctly let play continue and in return Liam Millar equalized with his left foot from a half-right position after an opening pass from Darian Males. In the final phase, FCB were no longer in danger of losing their advantage and were close to getting th winning goal. Arthur Cabral hit the bar in the 82nd minute after a corner.

Kairat (25 November 2021)

Kairat play their home games in the Central Stadium in Almaty, Kazakhstan. The distance between Basel and Almaty is somewhat over 5,000 kilometres or about 8 hours flying time and the time zone difference is 5 hours. There was an attendance of 4,159 fans present as referee Goga Kikacheishvili of the Georgian Football Federation blew his whistle for kick-off. Basel started fast into the game, pressing forwards, they were awarded three corner-kicks in the first two minutes. However, it took a quarter of an hour until the first shot was fired at goal, but Wouter Burger's efforts was sent too central and keeper Stas Pokatilov had no problems with it. After this starting offensive Kairat came better in the game and after a move from the right Vágner Love was stood alone as the ball came to him and he was able to side foot it home. Up until the break, creative moves were rare with the exception of one Basel attack that ended with a foul on Valentin Stocker and Arthur Cabral converted the spot kick. After the interval Kairat were the better team and on 56 minutes Kamo Hovhannisyan put the hosts back into the lead. Up until 70 minutes there was nothing to indicate that FCB would take even one point with them and the Kazakhs could and should have led significantly higher than with 2–1. But Edon Zhegrova, who had been substituted on five minutes earlier, with a magnificent shot from 25 meters under the crossbar, as well as Pajtim Kasami following a nice attack via Zhegrova and Tomas Tavares, brought the turnaround within four minutes. The Basel team were twice behind against Kairat Almaty, but win 3–2 and remain undefeated in the group stage after five rounds. Because in the second game of group H, leaders Qarabağ Agdam and Omonia Nicosia drew 2–2, Basel and Qarabağ were level on points before the direct duel in the 6th round.

Qarabağ (9 December 2021)

The starting position before the game was clear. Basel and Qarabağ were level with 11 points apiece, eight more than third-placed Omonia, and with the same goal difference (+5), Basel occupied top spot by virtue of having scored a goal more, Basel totaled 11–6 goals, Qarabağ 10–5. This meant that a draw on Matchday 6 would keep Basel in top space. Qarabağ had to win at St. Jakob-Park to qualify directly for the round of 16.

The St. Jakob-Park had an attendance of 10,059 spectators on this cloudy and cold evening and the pitch was reported as dry and good. Shortly after kick-off Basel would actually have fallen behind after just one minute. Qarabağ's Frenchman Abdellah Zoubir hit at goal with a low shot. The ball had crossed the goal line by about three feet when defender Sergio Lopez "cleared". The referee Fran Jović of the Croatian Football Federation let play continue. Qarabağ had another chance a few minutes later, two good passes bridging the midfield and Ibrahima Wadji was free behind the defence, but Heinz Lindner was equal to his attempt. Another few minutes later two quick passes and Patrick Andrade forced the keeper to make another diving save. Basel could not get their opponents under control, but after this 10-minute tempo start from the visitors, Basel came into the game. Nearly half an hour played Edon Zhegrova dribbled through the visitors’ defence, but as he is stopped the loose ball comes to Arthur Cabral. However, his shot is a big save from the diving keeper Shahrudin Mahammadaliyev. Basel then took control of the game. Edon Zhegrova had a shot, this was diverted to Cabral, who put the ball into the net, but the referee decides on off-side, a mistake because the ball game from a defender. Another minute later the next chance, the play is now a game on one goal. Zhegrova pass to López, pass to Kasami, high ball to Matias Palacios, who flicked the ball into the centre, 1-0 after 33 minutes as Arthur Cabral scored with a header. Basel had more chances before the break, the best being Cabral's bicycle kick just before the interval.

Qarabağ started the second period as they had the first, pushing forward, but their best chance was hit over the top in the 50th minute from just three meters out by the Senegalese Wadji. Again, head coach Patrick Rahmen's team knew how to absorb the problems and fought back into the game. Cabral ran through the entire Qarabağ defence toward the goal, he left all defenders behind him, but goalie Mahammadaliyev saved his attempt. Again Cabral, this time on the right-side line, he sent Dan Ndoye forwards into space, his cross was headed against the cross bar and Pajtim Kasami pushed the rebound over the line on 62 minutes. With Cabral's 3–0 after 74 minutes, the decision was made. But how the goal was made was unique, probably something that was never seen before. Tomás Tavares sent Ndoye down the right flank with a well timed passed. Ndoye played the cross toward the centre and Cabral after falling flat, lying on the pitch, headed the ball into the net. The 3–0 score was the result at full time.

Conclusion

From the six group games of the newly created Conference League, FC Basel got almost everything they could get out of it. With 14 out of the possible 18 points, they did a lot to ensure that the Swiss Super League could improve its position in the UEFA country ranking at the end of the season. Thanks to the group victory, the team skipped the round of 32 and they will enter the knockout phase in the round of 16. In addition to this, the four wins and the two draws will add 2,3 million euros in prize money into the club's finance account.

The draw for the knockout round play-offs was held on 13 December 2021, 14:00 CET and in the round of 32 Qarabağ were drawn against Olympique de Marseille. The first legs will be played on 17 February, and the second legs will be played on 24 February 2022.

==== Round of 16 ====
The draw for the round of 16 was held on 25 February 2022, 13:00 CET. Basel were seeded and were drawn against Marseille. The first legs were played on 10 March, and the second legs were played on 17 March 2022.

Olympique de Marseille (10 March 2022)

FC Basel lost the round of 16 first leg in the Conference League away at Olympique Marseille 1–2. Sebastiano Esposito kept Basel's hopes of progressing alive. He stayed cool in the 79th minute after a dream pass from substitute Wouter Burger and reduced the score for the visitors. And six minutes later, Basel were only inches away from equalizing. Marseille defender Valentin Rongier caught goalkeeper Steve Mandanda on the footed with a header back pass, so that Mandanda was only able to get the ball off the line in extremis. The 2–2 would have been too much of a good thing. Because, despite this being the first defeat in the current campaign, the result from Basel's point of view was the best thing on that evening in the Stade Vélodrome in the southern French metropolis. FCB was clearly inferior to the third-placed Ligue 1 team for almost 80 minutes and could have lost significantly higher. Arkadiusz Milik's two goals were too meager for Marseille, who were relegated to third-tier competition being third placed in the Europa League group. In the 19th minute, the Pole scored with a foul penalty after Nice-born Andy Pelmard acted impetuously and naively in his own penalty area. In the 68th minute, Milik scored the 2–0 following a rebound from Basel's keeper Heinz Lindner. Gerson's clever quick flick was picked up by Rongier who was in space in the middle. He powers forward before unleashing a low drive which Lindner was unable to hold, and the Polish international was quickest to react to the loose ball, blasting it into the roof of the net. Milik alone could have scored two more goals, in the 36th minute he failed alone with only Lindner to beat and in the 61st minute he only hit the post. The lively Cengiz Ünder cut in from the touchline and played a defence-splitting pass toward the right hand side of the box for the goalscorer to run onto. He raced across the area and hit a hard right-footed effort that cracked back from the base of the upright.

Second leg (17 March 2022)

Because on this evening a completely different FCB was on the field than a week before, as the French team were mostly clearly superior in terms of play and it was only their inability in their finishing, or at other times the reactions of a strong goalkeeper Heinz Lindner that prevented the FCB from suffering a higher defeat than that 1–2. The Austrian keeper was also a backup for the team of caretaker coach Guillermo Abascal in this second leg. He was at the origin of a moment that made the 22,081 spectators in the St. Jakob-Park believe in duel's a turning point with the second placed team in the French Ligue 1. In the 35th minute, Lindner dived doen to the right corner and saved Amine Harit's penalty kick. This had been caused due to a clumsy tackle by Wouter Burger after FCB defence had moved far to forward taking their own corner kick. It wouldn't remain the FCB goalie's only save. Against Cédric Bakambu, who had hammered the rebound from Lindner's penalty save into the night sky, Lindner reacted outstandingly several times. In this way he kept the hopes for his team alive, after all, one goal would have been enough for extra time.

And that one goal was to come. Sebastiano Esposito, the scorer from the first leg, brought a wide cross back into the box in the 62nd minute, where Dan Ndoye eluded his opponent and headed past Steve Mandanda in the Marseille goal. It was the reward for the committed performance of an FCB, who had recently appeared more stable in the championship. Until Gerson and Cengiz Ünder abruptly stopped Basel's upswing. After conceding the first goal, Basel rarely managed to get play into the danger zone, Marseille had more control of the game, and after a counterattack in added time, Valentin Rongier ensured that OM also won the second leg 2–1.

Conclusion

FC Basel also lost the return leg in the round of 16 of the Conference League 1–2 against Olympique Marseille. They were eliminated and could not reward themselves for a long, hard and convincing performance. OM defeated PAOK 3-1 on aggregate in the quarter-finals and were drawn against Feyenoord in the semi-finals.

== Players ==
=== First-team squad ===
The following is the list of the Basel first team squad. It also includes players that were in the squad the day the season started on 25 July 2021, but subsequently left the club after that date.

Note: Flags indicate national team as defined under FIFA eligibility rules; some limited exceptions apply. Players may hold more than one non-FIFA nationality.

No.	Pos.	Nation	Player
1	GK	AUT	Heinz Lindner
3	DF	POR	Gonçalo Cardoso (on loan from West Ham)
3	DF	GER	Noah Katterbach (on loan from Köln)
4	DF	SUI	Eray Cömert
5	DF	SUI	Michael Lang
6	DF	BFA	Nasser Djiga
7	MF	SUI	Pajtim Kasami
8	MF	ESP	Jordi Quintillà
9	FW	ITA	Sebastiano Esposito (on loan from Inter Milan)
10	FW	BRA	Arthur Cabral
11	FW	ANG	Afimico Pululu
13	GK	SRB	Đorđe Nikolić
14	MF	SUI	Valentin Stocker (captain)
17	FW	CAN	Liam Millar
18	MF	GHA	Emmanuel Essiam
19	MF	SUI	Darian Males (on loan from Inter Milan)
20	MF	SUI	Fabian Frei (3rd captain)
21	DF	FRA	Andy Pelmard (on loan from Nice)

No.	Pos.	Nation	Player
22	DF	GER	Sergio López
23	MF	NED	Wouter Burger
24	FW	SUI	Tician Tushi
27	MF	SUI	Dan Ndoye (on loan from Nice)
28	DF	ITA	Raoul Petretta
29	DF	SUI	Adrian Durrer
30	DF	POR	Tomás Tavares (on loan from Benfica)
34	MF	ALB	Taulant Xhaka (vice-captain)
35	MF	ARG	Matías Palacios
40	MF	SUI	Liam Chipperfield
46	GK	GER	Felix Gebhardt
49	DF	SUI	Louis Lurvink (on loan at Schaffhausen until 30 June 2022)
71	MF	SUI	Carmine Chiappetta
72	MF	SUI	Andrea Padula
76	DF	SUI	Albian Hajdari (on loan from Juventus U23)
77	FW	SEN	Kaly Sene (loan to Grasshopper Club)
96	MF	POR	Joelson Fernandes (on loan from Sporting)
99	MF	KOS	Edon Zhegrova
99	FW	RUS	Fyodor Chalov (on loan from CSKA Moscow)

==== Academy players with first-team contracts ====
Note: Flags indicate national team as defined under FIFA eligibility rules; some limited exceptions apply. Players may hold more than one non-FIFA nationality.

No.	Pos.	Nation	Player
29	DF	SUI	Adrian Durrer
39	DF	SUI	Louis Lurvink
40	MF	SUI	Liam Chipperfield

No.	Pos.	Nation	Player
—	MF	SUI	Mihailo Stevanovic
—	MF	SUI	Lirik Vishi
32	FW	SUI	Andrin Hunziker

=== Transfers summer 2021 ===
==== In ====
Note: Flags indicate national team as defined under FIFA eligibility rules; some limited exceptions apply. Players may hold more than one non-FIFA nationality.

No.	Pos.	Nation	Player
5	DF	SUI	Michael Lang (from Borussia Mönchengladbach)
6	DF	BFA	Nasser Djiga (from Vitesse FC, Burkina-Faso)
8	MF	ESP	Jordi Quintillà (free-transfer from St. Gallen)
9	FW	ITA	Sebastiano Esposito (on loan from Inter)
17	FW	CAN	Liam Millar (from Liverpool)
21	DF	FRA	Andy Pelmard (on loan from Nice)

No.	Pos.	Nation	Player
22	DF	ESP	Sergio López (from Real Madrid)
23	MF	NED	Wouter Burger (from Feyenoord)
27	MF	SUI	Dan Ndoye (on loan from Nice)
29	DF	SUI	Adrian Durrer (from U21)
30	DF	POR	Tomás Tavares (on loan from Benfica)
96	MF	POR	Joelson Fernandes (on loan from Sporting)

==== Out ====
Note: Flags indicate national team as defined under FIFA eligibility rules; some limited exceptions apply. Players may hold more than one non-FIFA nationality.

No.	Pos.	Nation	Player
—	DF	SUI	Silvan Widmer (to Mainz 05)
—	MF	ALB	Amir Abrashi (end of loan from Freiburg)
—	MF	SUI	Luca Zuffi (end of contract)
—	FW	SUI	Julian Von Moos (on loan to SBV Vitesse)
—	DF	SUI	Jasper van der Werff (end of loan from Red Bull Salzburg)
—	DF	SUI	Timm Klose (end of loan from Norwich City)

No.	Pos.	Nation	Player
—	MF	SUI	Orges Bunjaku (to Grenoble Foot 38)
—	MF	FRA	Aldo Kalulu (end of contract)
—	MF	SUI	Yannick Marchand (on loan to Grenoble Foot 38 until 31 December 2021)
—	GK	SUI	Jozef Pukaj (end of contract)
—	DF	SUI	Elis Isufi (end of contract)
—	DF	BRA	Jorge (end of loan from Monaco)
77	FW	SEN	Kaly Sene (loan to Grasshopper Club)

=== Transfers winter break ===
==== In ====
Note: Flags indicate national team as defined under FIFA eligibility rules; some limited exceptions apply. Players may hold more than one non-FIFA nationality.

No.	Pos.	Nation	Player
3	DF	GER	Noah Katterbach (on loan from 1. FC Köln)
18	MF	GHA	Emmanuel Essiam (from Berekum Chelsea)

No.	Pos.	Nation	Player
—	FW	RUS	Fyodor Chalov (on loan from CSKA Moscow)
76	MF	SUI	Albian Hajdari (on loan from Juventus)

==== Out ====
Note: Flags indicate national team as defined under FIFA eligibility rules; some limited exceptions apply. Players may hold more than one non-FIFA nationality.

No.	Pos.	Nation	Player
3	DF	POR	Gonçalo Cardoso (end of loan)
4	DF	SUI	Eray Cömert (to Valencia)
8	MF	ESP	Jordi Quintillà (to St. Gallen)
10	FW	BRA	Arthur Cabral (to Fiorentina)
11	FW	ANG	Afimico Pululu (to Greuther Fürth)
24	FW	SUI	Tician Tushi (on loan at Winterthur until 30 June 2022)

No.	Pos.	Nation	Player
29	DF	SUI	Adrian Durrer (to Lugano)
49	DF	SUI	Louis Lurvink (at Schaffhausen until 30 June 2022)
71	MF	SUI	Carmine Chiappetta (on loan at Winterthur until 30 June 2022)
99	MF	KOS	Edon Zhegrova (to Lille OSC)
—	FW	SUI	Julian Von Moos (to St. Gallen)
—	MF	SUI	Yannick Marchand (on loan to Xamax until 30 June 2022)

== Results and fixtures ==
Kickoff times are in CET.

=== Legend ===
Win Draw Loss Postponed

=== Friendly matches ===
==== Pre-season ====
27 June 2021 Friendly	Basel	2–3	Thun	Stade du Christ-Roi, Lens, Valais
14:30	Zhegrova 16'; Sene 29'	FCB report	12' Kyeremateng; 13' Daniel Dos Santos; 22' Vasic	Attendance: 0 Referee: Vladimir Ovcharov

1 July 2021 Friendly	Basel	4–4	Dynamo Kyiv	Stade de Copet, Vevey
19:00	Kasami 36' (1:2); Cabral 45' (pen. 2:2); Cabral 60' (3:3); Marchand 82' (4:4)	FCB report	23' (0:1) Antukh; 30' (0:2) Syrota; 48' (2:3) Lednev; 66' (3:4) Korobenko	Attendance: 500; Referee: (Switzerland) Urs Schnyder

6 July 2021 Friendly	Basel	1–0	Grasshopper Club	Youth Campus Basel, Münchenstein
16:30	Kasami 4' (1:0); Jordi Quintillà (yellow card) 28'	FCB report		Attendance: 270; Referee: (Switzerland) Adrien Jaccottet

9 July 2021 Friendly	Basel	1–0	Strasbourg	Colmar Stadium, Colmar
18:30	Sene 4' (1:0); Durrer (yellow card) 29'	FCB report	(yellow card) 25' Ajorque; (penalty missed) 79′ Chahiri	Attendance: 2,600; Referee: (France) Jérémy Pignard

10 July 2021 Friendly	Basel	3–3	Aarau	Youth Campus Basel, Münchenstein
19:00	Cabral 19' (1:0); Kasami (yellow card) 31' (goal) 68' (2:1); Frei 82' (pen.)	FCB report	63' (1:1) Gashi; 75' (2:2) Balaj; 86' (3:3) Aratore	Attendance: 0 Referee: (Switzerland) Sven Wolfensberger

17 July 2021 Friendly	Hamburger SV	1–0	Basel	Volksparkstadion, Hamburg
15:30	Wintzheimer 39'	Summary		Attendance: 4,034; Referee: (Germany) Patrick Ittrich

==== Winter break and mid-season ====
8 January 2022 Winter break	Basel	3–1	SV Sandhausen	Youth Campus Basel, Münchenstein
14:30	Cabral 36'; Palacios 55'; Gruber 66'	FCB report	19' Testroet	Attendance: 0 Referee: (Switzerland) Nico Gianforte
Note: Fair game, no yellow cards. Basel played with Spycher (goalkeeper), Mile Vukelic (defender), Mehmet Manis (forward) and Zsombor Gruber (forward) from their U-21 team. No spectators admitted

12 January 2022 Winter break	Lugano	1–2	Basel	Cornaredo, Lugano
13:30	Abubakar 24'; Campello (yellow card) 72'	FCB report	60' Chipperfield; 83' Fernandes	Attendance: 200; Referee: (Switzerland) David Schärli
Note: Basel played with Spycher (goalkeeper), Chipperfield (midfielder) from their U-21 team.

19 January 2022 Winter break	Basel	3–0	Lausanne-Sport	Youth Campus Basel, Münchenstein
14:00	Ndoye 46'; Frei 47' (pen.); Fernandes 86'	FCB report	(yellow card) 29' Brown	Attendance: 0 Referee: (Switzerland) Sven Wolfensberger
Note: No spectators admitted

22 January 2022 Winter break	Basel	3–1	Xamax	Youth Campus Basel, Münchenstein
15:00	Djiga (yellow card) 10'; Frei 38' (pen.); Esposito 44' (pen.); Cabral 65'	FCB report	(yellow card) 82' Rodriguez; 87' Koide	Attendance: 0 Referee: (Switzerland) Urs Schnyder
Note: No spectators admitted

25 January 2022 Winter break	Basel	5–1	Black Stars Basel	Youth Campus Basel, Münchenstein
15:00	Chipperfield 13'; Stocker 20'; Cabral 30' (pen.); Hajdari 41'; Esposito 66'; Kasami (yellow card) 68'	FCB report	7' Turkes; (yellow card) 86' Fischer	Attendance: 0 Referee: (Switzerland) Sven Wolfensberger
Note: No spectators admitted

24 March 2022 Mid-season	Karlsruher SC	6–1	Basel	Wildparkstadion, Karlsruhe
18:00	Hofmann 11'; Schleusener 27'; Gerold 74'; Schleusener 78'; Wanitzek 82'; Wanitzek 86'	FCB report	22' Gruber	Attendance: 3,050; Referee: (Germany) Lars Erbst
Note: FCB with various absences due to the national team matches. Basel played with only 7 first team players, the other players came from their U-21 and U-18 teams.

4 May 2022 Global Tour for Peace	Basel	2–3	Dynamo Kyiv	St. Jakob-Park, Basel
19:00	Szalai 43'; Esposito 61'	FCB report FC Dynamo summary	Karavayev 23'; Andriyevskyi 78'; Popov 81'	Attendance: 15,391; Referee: (Switzerland) Esther Staubli
Note: Fair game, no yellow or red cards

=== Swiss Super League ===
The league fixtures were announced on 24 June 2021.

==== First half of season ====
25 July 2021 Round 1	Grasshopper Club	0–2	Basel	Letzigrund, Zürich
16:30	Abrashi (yellow card) 22'; Diani (yellow card) 38'; Herc (yellow card) 41'; Toti (yellow card) 87'; Arigoni (yellow card) 87'	FCB report	(yellow card) 5' Xhaka; (yellow card) 21' Kasami; (yellow card) 26' Petretta; 54' (o.g.) Leonardo Campana; (yellow card) 68' Quintillà	Attendance: 3,400; Referee: (Switzerland) Lukas Fähndrich

1 August 2021 Round 2	Basel	6–1	Sion	St. Jakob-Park, Basel
16:30	Kasami 4'; López 15'; Cömert 21'; López (yellow card) 36'; Esposito 42'; Cabral 44'; Zhegrova 55'	FCB report	(yellow card) 24' Serey Dié; (yellow card) 35' Lacroix; 88' Stojilković	Attendance: 15,112; Referee: (Switzerland) Fedayi San

8 August 2021 Round 3	Basel	5–1	Servette	St. Jakob-Park, Basel
16:30	Cabral 19'; Stocker (yellow card) 32'; Kasami (yellow card) 33'; Cabral 45+1' (pen.); Cabral 50'; 60' (pen.); Cabral 63'	FCB report	(yellow card) 5' Céspedes; 75' Kyei; (yellow card) 87' Sauthier	Attendance: 16,142; Referee: (Switzerland) Luca Piccolo

22 August 2021 Round 4	Lausanne-Sport	2–2	Basel	Stade de la Tuilière, Lausanne
14:15	Mahou 9'; Sow (yellow card) 50'; Amdouni 69'; Mahou (yellow card) 73'; Suzuki (yellow card) 81'	FCB report	(yellow card) 40' Petretta; 45+2' (pen.) Cabral; 59' Cabral	Attendance: 5,600; Referee: (Switzerland) Fedayi San (Gebenstorf)

29 August 2021 Round 5	Basel	1–1	Young Boys	St. Jakob-Park, Basel
16:30	Cabral (yellow card) 41'; Esposito 52'; Petretta (yellow card) 87'; Palacios (yellow card) 90'	FCB report SFV report	20' Siebatcheu; (yellow card) 38' Aebischer; (yellow card) 41' (yellow-red card) 43' Maceiras; (yellow card) 68' Moumi; (yellow card) 71' Zesiger	Attendance: 30,027; Referee: (Switzerland) Sandro Schärer (Buttikon)

12 September 2021 Round 6	Lugano	1–1	Basel	Cornaredo, Lugano
16:30	Bottani (yellow card) 7'; Marić (yellow card) 41'; Custodio (yellow card) 57'; Abubakar 59'; Daprelà (yellow card) 86'	FCB Report	29' Cabral; (yellow card) 61' Kasami	Attendance: 3,050; Referee: (Switzerland) Lukas Fähndrich

22 September 2021 Round 7	St. Gallen	0–2	Basel	Kybunpark, St. Gallen
20:30	Fazliji (yellow card) 22' (yellow-red card) 81'; Görtler (yellow card) 25'	FCB Report	16', 86' Cabral; (yellow card) 34' Millar; (yellow card) 58' Ndoye; (yellow card) 77' Xhaka	Attendance: 14,321; Referee: (Switzerland) Sandro Schärer (Buttikon)

26 September 2021 Round 8	Basel	3–1	Zürich	St. Jakob-Park, Basel
16:30	Millar 34'; Tavares 73'; Cabral 82'; Burger (yellow card) 86'	FCB report	(yellow card) 38' Aliti; (yellow card) 73' Boranijašević; (yellow card) 78' Guerrero; 79' Marchesano; (yellow card) 86' Džemaili; (yellow card) 90+4' Gnonto	Attendance: 27,264; Referee: (Switzerland) Urs Schnyder

3 October 2021 Round 9	Basel	1–1	Luzern	St. Jakob-Park, Basel
16:30	Frei (yellow card) 64'; Stocker 68'; Cömert (yellow card) 90'	FCB report	(yellow card) 34' Sorgić; 78' Wehrmann	Attendance: 20,883; Referee: (Switzerland) Alessandro Dudic

17 October 2021 Round 10	Sion	0–1	Basel	Stade Tourbillon, Sion
16:30	Xhaka (yellow card) 38'; Cömert (red card) 88'; Zhegrova 90'	FCB report	(yellow card) 27' Baltazar; (yellow card) 45' Cavaré; (yellow card) 76' Wesley	Attendance: 8,350; Referee: (Switzerland) Luca Cibelli

24 October 2021 Round 11	Basel	2–0	Lugano	St. Jakob-Park, Basel
16:30	Frei (yellow card) 64' (goal) 10'; Cabral 32'; Kasami (penalty missed) 55′	FCB report		Attendance: 19,290; Referee: (Switzerland) Alessandro Dudic

30 October 2021 Round 12	Zürich	3–3	Basel	Letzigrund, Zürich
20:30	Boranijašević 47'; Frei 53' (o.g.); Ceesay (yellow card) 90+3'; Ceesay 90+5'	FCB report	29' Cabral; (yellow card) 42' Lang; 48' Ndoye; 63' Millar; (yellow card) 71' Kasami; (yellow card) 90+3' Burger	Attendance: 15,030; Referee: (Switzerland) Lukas Fähndrich

7 November 2021 Round 13	Basel	0–1	St. Gallen	St. Jakob-Park, Basel
16:30	Millar (yellow card) 46'; Burger (yellow card) 70'; Ndoye (yellow card) 76'	FCB report	(yellow card) 24' Nuhu; (yellow card) 82' Zigi; 87' Youan	Attendance: 23,599; Referee: (Switzerland) Urs Schnyder

20 November 2021 Round 14	Young Boys	P–P	Basel	Stadion Wankdorf, Bern
20:30

28 November 2021 Round 15	Luzern	1–3	Basel	Swissporarena, Luzern
16:30	Domgjoni (yellow card) 47'; Schürpf (yellow card) 78'; Čumić 90+1'	FCB report	3' Cabral; (yellow card) 34' Quintillà; (yellow card) 36' Pelmard; 49' Petretta; (yellow card) 54' López; 58' Palacios	Attendance: 12,159; Referee: (Switzerland) Sandro Schärer (Buttikon)

5 December 2021 Round 16	Basel	1–1	Lausanne-Sport	St. Jakob-Park, Basel
14:15	Frei (yellow card) 56'; Tavares (yellow card) 80'; Fernandes (yellow card) 90+1'; Petretta (yellow card) 90+4'; Kasami 90+5'	FCB report	(yellow card) 34' N'Guessan; (yellow card) 56' Grippo; (yellow card) 85' Kukuruzović; 90+1' (pen.) Kukuruzović; (yellow card) 90+4' Sanches; (yellow card) 90+5' Diaw	Attendance: 18,871; Referee: (Switzerland) Adrien Jaccottet (Basel)

12 December 2021 Round 17	Servette	2–2	Basel	Stade de Genève, Geneva
16:30	Stevanović 17'; Cognat 47'; Kastriot Imeri (yellow card) 77'	FCB report	37' López; (yellow card) 44' Tavares; (yellow card) 77' Cabral; 84' Millar; (yellow card) 90+2' Palacios	Attendance: 7,021; Referee: (Switzerland) Sandro Schärer (Buttikon)

15 December 2021 Round 14	Young Boys	1–1	Basel	Stadion Wankdorf, Bern
20:30	Elia 20'; Sierro (yellow card) 51'; Ngamaleu (penalty missed) 55′ Ngamaleu (yellow card) 57'; Zesiger (yellow card) 61'	FCB report	(yellow card) 12' Palacios; 37' Millar; (yellow card) 69' Esposito; (yellow card) 87' Burger	Attendance: 20,912; Referee: (Switzerland) Fedayi San (Gebenstorf)

19 December 2021 Round 18	Basel	2–2	Grasshopper Club	St. Jakob-Park, Basel
16:30	Stocker 45'; Kasami (yellow card) 87'; Ndoye (yellow card) 88'; Esposito (red card) 90'; Kasami 90+'; Cabral (yellow card) 90+'	FCB report	(yellow card) 50' Diani; 53' Kawabe; (yellow card) 57' Kawabe; (yellow card) 81' Bonatini; 86' Pusic; (yellow card) 90+' Demhasaj; (yellow card) 90+' Georg Margreitter	Attendance: 21,422; Referee: (Switzerland) Alain Bieri (Solothurn)

==== Second half of season ====
30 January 2022 Round 19	Luzern	0–3	Basel	Swissporarena, Luzern
16:30	Čumić (yellow card) 21'; Müller (yellow card) 60'; Schulz (yellow card) 75' (yellow-red card) 78'; Jashari (yellow card) 78'	FCB report SFL report	(yellow card) 31' Palacios; 49' (pen.) Frei; (yellow card) 52' Katterbach; (yellow card) 66' Pelmard; (yellow card) 76' Burger; 85' Males; (yellow card) 90+5' Frei; 90+7' Frei	Attendance: 10,779; Referee: (Switzerland) Lukas Fähndrich

6 February 2022 Round 20	Basel	3–3	Sion	St. Jakob-Park, Basel
14:15	Stocker 23'; Ndoye 35'; Chalov (yellow card) 42'; Xhaka (yellow card) 68'; Millar 69'	FCB report SFL summary	11' Itaitinga; (yellow card) 30' Ndoye; (yellow card) 32' Cavaré; (yellow card) 33' Marquinhos; 56' Grgić; 83' (pen.) Grgić; (yellow card) 84' Grgić; (yellow card) 90+1' Fickentscher	Attendance: 19,509; Referee: (Switzerland) Luca Piccolo

13 February 2022 Round 21	Young Boys	3–1	Basel	Stadion Wankdorf, Bern
14:15	Sierro 39'; Lefort (yellow card) 43'; Ngamaleu 69'; Pefok 72'; Garcia (yellow card) 55' (yellow-red card) 80'	FCB report SFL summary	22' Lang; (yellow card) 54' (yellow-red card) 60' Burger; (yellow card) 78' Frei	Attendance: 31,120; Referee: (Switzerland) Urs Schnyder

19 February 2022 Round 22	Basel	3–0	Lausanne-Sport	St. Jakob-Park, Basel
20:30	Frei (yellow card) 39'; Lang 50'; Szalai 65'; Pavlović (yellow card) 75'; Katterbach 89'	FCB report SFL summary	(yellow card) 16' Suzuki; (yellow card) 87' Amdouni	Attendance: 20,285; Referee: (Switzerland) Alessandro Dudic

27 February 2022 Round 23	Zürich	4–2	Basel	Letzigrund, Zürich
16:30	Marchesano 8'; Kramer 16'; Aliti (yellow card) 63'; Gnonto 78'; Ćorić (yellow card) 85'; Gnonto (yellow card) 88'; Boranijašević 90+5'	FCB report SFL summary	(yellow card) 21' Katterbach; (yellow card) 29' Frei; 38' Stocker; (yellow card) 64' Lang; 90+1' Lang	Attendance: 21,185; Referee: (Switzerland) Lukas Fähndrich

3 March 2022 Round 24	Basel	2–2	St. Gallen	St. Jakob-Park, Basel
20:30	Xhaka (yellow card) 36'; Frei (yellow card) 41'; Chalov 56'; Chalov 83'	FCB report SFL summary	20' Guillemenot; 22' Duah; (yellow card) 32' Euclides Cabral; (yellow card) 36' Guillemenot; (yellow card) 45' Ruiz; (yellow card) 90+4' Besio; (yellow card) 90+4' Jankewitz	Attendance: 19,572; Referee: (Switzerland) Fedayi San (Gebenstorf)

6 March 2022 Round 25	Lugano	0–2	Basel	Cornaredo, Lugano
14:15	Hajrizi (yellow card) 12'; Lovrić (yellow card) 16'; Fabio Daprelà (yellow card) 72'	FCB report SFL summary	9' Chalov; (yellow card) 33' Stocker; (yellow card) 40' López; (yellow card) 53' Chalov; (yellow card) 76' Xhaka; 90+3' Males	Attendance: 3,287; Referee: (Switzerland) Stefan Horisberger

13 March 2022 Round 26	Basel	2–0	Servette	St. Jakob-Park, Basel
16:30	Chipperfield 69'; Szalai 88'	FCB report SFL summary	(red card) 29' Diallo; (yellow card) 38' (yellow-red card) 85' Gaël Clichy; (yellow card) 42' Douline; (yellow card) 85' Sasso	Attendance: 19,041; Referee: (Switzerland) Alain Bieri (Solothurn)

20 March 2022 Round 27	Grasshopper Club	2–4	Basel	Letzigrund, Zürich
16:30	Sène 24' (yellow card) 59'; Kawabe 38' da Silva (yellow card) 66'	FCB report SFL summary	16' Millar; 44' Lang; 52' 79' Szalai; (yellow card) 88' Stocker	Attendance: 5,894; Referee: (Switzerland) Urs Schnyder

3 April 2022 Round 28	Basel	2–2	Young Boys	St. Jakob-Park, Basel
16:30	Xhaka 41'; Lang (yellow card) 49'; Esposito 71'; Kasami (yellow card) 90+2'; Pelmard (yellow card) 90+4'	FCB report SFL summary	(yellow card) 57' Sierro; 61' Fernandes; (yellow card) 64' Mambimbi; 78' Kanga; (yellow card) 84' Amenda	Attendance: 25,760; Referee: (Switzerland) Fedayi San (Gebenstorf)

10 April 2022 Round 29	St. Gallen	2–2	Basel	Kybunpark, St. Gallen
16:30	Duah 20'; Maglica (yellow card) 49'; Cabral (yellow card) 60'; Guillemenot 65'; Ruiz (yellow card) 76'	FCB report SFL summary	26' (o.g.) Stergiou; (yellow card) 60' Xhaka; (yellow card) 61' Stocker; 67' Burger; (yellow card) 70' Lang	Attendance: 18,861; Referee: (Switzerland) Urs Schnyder

18 April 2022 Round 30	Sion	0–0	Basel	Stade Tourbillon, Sion
16:30		FCB report SFL summary	(yellow card) 65' Frei; (yellow card) 86' Pelmard; (yellow card) 90+3' Xhaka	Attendance: 9,800; Referee: (Switzerland) Stefan Horisberger

24 April 2022 Round 31	Basel	3–0	Luzern	St. Jakob-Park, Basel
16:30	Stocker 3'; Stocker (yellow card) 4'; Tavares (yellow card) 18'; Stocker 73'; Chalov 87'	FCB report SFL summary	(yellow card) 51' Grether; (yellow card) 67' Sorgić	Attendance: 21,905; Referee: (Switzerland) Urs Schnyder

1 May 2022 Round 32	Basel	0–2	Zürich	St. Jakob-Park, Basel
16:30	López (yellow card) 30'; Kasami (yellow card) 34'; Ndoye (yellow card) 81'; Pavlović (yellow card) 89'	FCB report SFL summary	(yellow card) 28' Ceesay; (yellow card) 31' Boranijašević; (yellow card) 34' Kryeziu; 40' Ceesay; 45+3' Boranijašević; (yellow card) 66' Doumbia	Attendance: 33,810; Referee: (Switzerland) Fedayi San (Gebenstorf)

8 May 2022 Round 33	Lausanne-Sport	0–0	Basel	Stade de la Tuilière, Lausanne
16:30	Ouattara (yellow card) 53'; Chafik (yellow card) 83'	FCB report	(yellow card) 75' Xhaka	Attendance: 3,680; Referee: (Switzerland) Lionel Tschudi (Neuchâtel)
Note: Fabian Frei played his 453rd game for FCB and became record player with the most appearances for the club all competitions.

12 May 2022 Round 34	Basel	1–1	Grasshopper Club	St. Jakob-Park, Basel
20:30	Andy Pelmard (yellow card) 41'; Esposito 84'	FCB report SFL summary	(yellow card) 10' Bolla; 50' Riascos; (yellow card) 59' Riascos; (yellow card) 75' (yellow-red card) 77' Herc; (yellow card) 90+1' Moreira	Attendance: 19,228; Referee: (Switzerland) Stefan Horisberger

19 May 2022 Round 35	Servette	0–0	Basel	Stade de Genève, Geneva
20:30	Clichy (yellow card) 48'	FCB report SFL summary		Attendance: 5,802; Referee: (Switzerland) Lionel Tschudi (Neuchâtel)

22 May 2022 Round 36	Basel	2–1	Lugano	St. Jakob-Park, Basel
16:30	Males 6'; Ndoye (yellow card) 30'; Pavlović (yellow card) 34'; Kasami 71'; Kasami (yellow card) 71' (yellow-red card) 74'	FCB report SFL summary	27' Amoura; (yellow card) 59' Rüegg; (yellow card) 52' (yellow-red card) 90+2' Mahmoud	Attendance: 22,841; Referee: (Switzerland) Luca Cibelli

==== Final league table ====
Pos	Team	Pld	W	D	L	GF	GA	GD	Pts	Qualification or relegation
1	Zürich (C)	36	23	7	6	78	46	+32	76	Qualification to Champions League second qualifying round
2	Basel	36	15	17	4	70	41	+29	62	Qualification to Europa Conference League second qualifying round
3	Young Boys	36	16	12	8	80	50	+30	60	Qualification to Europa Conference League second qualifying round
4	Lugano	36	16	6	14	48	53	−5	54	Qualification to Europa Conference League third qualifying round (Note: Lugano qualified for the Europa Conference League third qualifying round as the 2021–22 Swiss Cup winners.)
5	St. Gallen	36	14	8	14	68	63	+5	50	
6	Servette	36	12	8	16	50	66	−16	44	
7	Sion	36	11	8	17	46	67	−21	41	
8	Grasshopper	36	9	13	14	54	58	−4	40	
9	Luzern (Q)	36	9	13	14	54	65	−11	40	Qualification to Relegation play-offs
10	Lausanne-Sport (R)	36	4	10	22	37	76	−39	22	Relegation to Swiss Challenge League

Source: Swiss Super League
Rules for classification: 1) Points; 2) Goal difference; 3) Goals scored; 4) Head-to-head goal difference; 5) Away goals scored; 6) Draw.
(C) Champions; (Q) Qualified for the phase indicated; (R) Relegated

=== Swiss Cup ===
15 August 2021 First round	FC Schönenwerd-Niedergösgen	0–7	FC Basel	Sportplatz Inseli, Niedergösgen.
16:00		SFV summary FCB report	20' (0:1) Tushi; 38' (0:2) (yellow card) 33' Petretta; 40' (pen.) Palacios; 53' (0:4) Males; 57' (0:5) Sene; 58' (o.g.) Lo Priore; 62' (0:7) Tushi	Attendance: 2,254 (sold out); Referee: (Switzerland) Johannes von Mandach

19 September 2021 Second round	FC Rorschach-Goldach 17	0–3	FC Basel	Sportanlage Kellen, Goldach
14:30	Patrice Baumann (yellow card) 40'	SFV summary FCB report	35' Millar; 62' Xhaka; 79' Palacios; (yellow card) 89' Lang	Attendance: 4,300; Referee: (Switzerland) Tobias Thies

27 October 2021 Third round	Étoile Carouge	1–0	FC Basel	Stade de la Fontenette, Carouge
19:00	Magnin (yellow card) 39'; Baddy Dega (yellow card) 54'; Kursner (yellow card) 83' (goal) 55'; Zoukit (yellow card) 56'; Mettler (yellow card) 74'; Boussaha (yellow card) 76'; Chappot (yellow card) 87'	SFV summary FCB report	(yellow card) 56' Males; (yellow card) 63' Pelmard	Attendance: 3,018; Referee: (Switzerland) Sven Wolfensberger

=== Europa Conference League ===
==== Second qualifying round ====
22 July 2021 First leg	Basel (Switzerland)	3–0	(Albania) Partizani	St. Jakob-Park, Basel
20:15	Stocker 43', 80'; Cabral 52'	Uefa report FCB report	(yellow card) 29' Damchevski; (yellow card) 70' Murataj	Attendance: 6,095; Referee: Dennis Higler (Netherlands)

29 July 2021 Second leg	Partizani (Albania)	0–2	(Switzerland) Basel	Elbasan Arena, Elbasan
20:00	Bardhi (yellow card) 35'	Uefa report FCB report	37' Stocker; 50' Cabral; (yellow card) 76' Frei	Attendance: 950; Referee: Gergő Bogár (Hungary)

==== Third qualifying round ====
5 August 2021 First leg	Újpest (Hungary)	1–2	(Switzerland) Basel	Szusza Ferenc Stadion, Budapest
21:00	Diaby (yellow card) 34'; Croizet 40'; Antonov (yellow card) 49'	Uefa report FCB report	55' Cabral; 74' Males; (yellow card) 90+3' Millar	Attendance: 2,367; Referee: Jérôme Brisard (France)

12 August 2021 Second leg	Basel (Switzerland)	4–0	(Hungary) Újpest	St. Jakob-Park, Basel
19:30	Males 21'; Stocker 45+2'; Cabral 70'; Petretta 90'	Uefa report FCB report	(yellow card) 16' Kastrati; (yellow card) 45+2' Antonov	Attendance: 12,337; Referee: Yigal Frid (Israel)

==== Play-off round ====
19 August 2021 First leg	Basel (Switzerland)	3–1	(Sweden) Hammarby IF	St. Jakob-Park, Basel
21:00	Cabral 30', 87', 90' (pen.); Esposito (yellow card) 70'; Stocker (yellow card) 82'	Uefa report FCB report	Amoo (yellow card) 7'; Khalili 71'; Bojanić (yellow card) 82'; Fjóluson (yellow card) 90+2'	Attendance: 12,144; Referee: Sergey Ivanov (Russia)

26 August 2021 Second leg	Hammarby IF (Sweden)	3–1 (a.e.t.) (3–4 p)	(Switzerland) Basel	Tele2 Arena, Stockholm
19:00	Fjóluson 48', 54'; Amoo 101'	Uefa report	Cabral 109' (pen.)	Attendance: 7,855; Referee: Bobby Madden (Scotland)
	Penalties
	Bojanić (penalty missed); Paulinho (penalty missed); Accam (penalty scored); Fenger (penalty scored); Sandberg (penalty scored)		(penalty scored) Cömert; (penalty scored) Frei; (penalty missed) Pelmard; (penalty scored) Pululu; (penalty scored) Cabral

==== Group stage ====
Pos	Team	Pld	W	D	L	GF	GA	GD	Pts	Qualification	BAS	QAR	OMO	KAI
1	(Switzerland) Basel	6	4	2	0	14	6	+8	14	Advance to round of 16	—	3–0	3–1	4–2
2	(Azerbaijan) Qarabağ	6	3	2	1	10	8	+2	11	Advance to knockout round play-offs	0–0	—	2–2	2–1
3	(Cyprus) Omonia	6	0	4	2	5	10	−5	4		1–1	1–4	—	0–0
4	(Kazakhstan) Kairat	6	0	2	4	6	11	−5	2		2–3	1–2	0–0	—

Source: UEFA
Legend: Blue = home team win; Yellow = draw; Red = away team win.
Rules for classification: Group stage tiebreakers

16 September 2021 Matchday 1	Qarabağ (Azerbaijan)	0–0	(Switzerland) Basel	Olympic Stadium, Baku (Note: Qarabağ played their first home match at Olympic Stadium, Baku, and played the other two home matches at Tofiq Bahramov Republican Stadium, Baku, instead of their regular stadium Azersun Arena, Baku, which did not meet UEFA requirements.)
18:45 (20:45 AZT)	Kady (yellow card) 61'	FCB summary UEFA report	(yellow card) 26' Burger; (yellow card) 51' Kasami; (yellow card) 90+2' Millar	Attendance: 17,586; Referee: Erik Lambrechts (Belgium)

30 September 2021 Matchday 2	Basel (Switzerland)	4–2	(Kazakhstan) Kairat	St. Jakob-Park, Basel
21:00	Cabral 15'; Lang 21', 40'; Ndoye 49'; Frei (yellow card) 50'; Djiga (yellow card) 68'	FCB summary UEFA report	(yellow card) 12' Dugalić; 65' Kanté; 69' (pen.) Alves	Attendance: 8,712; Referee: Stuart Attwell (England)

21 October 2021 Matchday 3	Basel (Switzerland)	3–1	(Cyprus) Omonia	St. Jakob-Park, Basel
21:00	Millar 19'; Cabral 41' (pen.); Zhegrova 88'	FCB summary UEFA report	27' (pen.) Gómez; (yellow card) 40' Gómez; (yellow card) 90+2' Ďuriš	Attendance: 10,056; Referee: Stéphanie Frappart (France)

4 November 2021 Matchday 4	Omonia (Cyprus)	1–1	(Switzerland) Basel	GSP Stadium, Nicosia
18:45 (19:45 EET)	Kakoullis 17'; Hubočan (yellow card) 26'; Charalambous (yellow card) 58'	FCB summary UEFA report	57' Millar; (yellow card) 60' Fernandes; (yellow card) 65' Cömert	Attendance: 4,597; Referee: Vitali Meshkov (Russia)

25 November 2021 Matchday 5	Kairat (Kazakhstan)	2–3	(Switzerland) Basel	Central Stadium, Almaty
16:30 (21:30 ALMT)	Vágner Love 23'; Góralski (yellow card) 44'; Hovhannisyan 56'; Alves (yellow card) 76'; Abiken (yellow card) 77'; Vorogovsky (yellow card) 89' (yellow-red card) 90+3'; Mikanović (yellow card) 90+5'	FCB summary UEFA report	45' (pen.) Cabral; (yellow card) 54' Pelmard; (yellow card) 61' Stocker; (yellow card) 66' Kasami; 69' Zhegrova; 73' Kasami; (yellow card) 77' Cabral	Attendance: 4,159; Referee: Goga Kikacheishvili (Georgia)

9 December 2021 Matchday 6	Basel (Switzerland)	3–0	(Azerbaijan) Qarabağ	St. Jakob-Park, Basel
21:00	Cabral 33'; Kasami 62'; Cabral 74'	FCB summary UEFA report	(yellow card) 81' Andrade	Attendance: 10,059; Referee: Fran Jović (Croatia)

==== Round of 16 ====
The draw for the round of 16 was held on 25 February 2022, 13:00 CET. The first legs were played on 10 March, and the second legs were played on 17 March 2022.

10 March 2022 First leg	Marseille (France)	2–1	(Switzerland) Basel	Marseille, France
21:00 CET (UTC+1)	Milik 19' (pen.), 68'; Payet (yellow card) 43'	Report	Esposito 79'; Burger (yellow card) 81'; Males (yellow card) 90+2'	Stadium: Stade Vélodrome; Attendance: 22,992; Referee: Irfan Peljto (Bosnia and Herzegovina)

17 March 2022 Second leg	Basel (Switzerland)	1–2 (2–4 agg.)	(France) Marseille	Basel, Switzerland
18:45 CET (UTC+1)	Chalov (yellow card) 26'; Burger (yellow card) 34'; Ndoye 63', (yellow card) 76'; Tavares (yellow card) 90+4'; Millar (yellow card) 90+5'	Report	Harit (penalty missed) 35'; Saliba (yellow card) 70'; Peres (yellow card) 70'; Ünder 74'; Mandanda (yellow card) 86'; Rongier 90+3'; Guendouzi (yellow card) 90+4'; Gerson (yellow card) 90+5'	Stadium: St. Jakob-Park; Referee: Artur Soares Dias (Portugal)

== See also ==
- History of FC Basel
- List of FC Basel players
- List of FC Basel seasons

== Sources ==
- FCB squad 2021–22 at fcb-archiv.ch
- Switzerland 2021–22 at RSSSF
