= List of Swiss football transfers winter 2025–26 =

This is a list of Swiss football transfers for the 2025–26 winter transfer window. Only transfers featuring Swiss Super League are listed.

== Swiss Super League ==
Note: Flags indicate national team as has been defined under FIFA eligibility rules. Players may hold more than one non-FIFA nationality.

=== Basel ===
In:

| No. | Pos. | Nation | Player |
|---|---|---|---|
| 4 | DF | SUI | Bećir Omeragić (from (France) Montpellier) |
| 18 | FW | BEL | Julien Duranville (on loan from (Germany) Borussia Dortmund) |

Out:

| No. | Pos. | Nation | Player |
|---|---|---|---|
| 7 | FW | NGR | Philip Otele (on loan to (Germany) Hamburger SV) |
| 9 | FW | SWE | Jeremy Agbonifo (loan return to (France) Lens) |
| 16 | GK | SUI | Tim Spycher (to Thun) |
| 26 | DF | BIH | Adrian Leon Barišić (on loan to (Portugal) Braga) |
| 32 | DF | GHA | Jonas Adjetey (to (Germany) VfL Wolfsburg) |
| 33 | MF | ARG | Juan Gauto (on loan to (Argentina) Platense) |
| 39 | FW | SUI | Arlet Junior Zé (on loan to (Denmark) Midtjylland) |
| — | MF | GHA | Emmanuel Essiam (on loan to Winterthur, previously on loan at (Belgium) Francs Borains) |
| — | FW | SUI | Noah Streit (to (Canada) CF Montréal, previously on loan at Neuchâtel Xamax) |

=== Servette ===
In:

| No. | Pos. | Nation | Player |
|---|---|---|---|
| 10 | FW | FRA | Junior Kadile (on loan from (Netherlands) Almere City) |
| 15 | DF | SUI | Marco Burch (from (Poland) Legia Warsaw) |
| 17 | DF | GBS | Houboulang Mendes (from (Netherlands) Fortuna Sittard) |

Out:

| No. | Pos. | Nation | Player |
|---|---|---|---|
| 6 | DF | GLP | Anthony Baron (to Yverdon-Sport) |
| 10 | MF | SUI | Alexis Antunes (to (Turkey) Göztepe) |
| 20 | DF | SUI | Théo Magnin (to (France) Red Star) |
| 22 | MF | FRA | Mattéo Anselme (on loan to Grand-Saconnex) |
| 29 | FW | POR | Keyan Varela (on loan to (Germany) Greuther Fürth) |
| 33 | DF | ALB | Leart Zuka (on loan to Grand-Saconnex) |
| 40 | GK | SUI | Marwan Aubert (on loan to Nyon) |

=== Young Boys ===
In:

| No. | Pos. | Nation | Player |
|---|---|---|---|
| 22 | DF | TUN | Yan Valery (on loan from (England) Sheffield Wednesday) |
| 33 | DF | SRB | Stefan Bukinac (from (Serbia) Vojvodina) |
| 99 | FW | COD | Samuel Essende (from (Germany) FC Augsburg) |

Out:

| No. | Pos. | Nation | Player |
|---|---|---|---|
| 9 | FW | VEN | Sergio Córdova (on loan to (United States) St. Louis City) |
| 25 | FW | SUI | Emmanuel Tsimba (on loan to Grasshopper) |
| 48 | FW | SUI | Janis Lüthi (on loan to Rapperswil-Jona) |
| 54 | MF | SUI | Lutfi Dalipi (on loan to Wil) |
| 66 | DF | SUI | Rhodri Smith (on loan to Winterthur) |

=== Lugano ===
In:

| No. | Pos. | Nation | Player |
|---|---|---|---|
| 3 | DF | HAI | Hannes Delcroix (from (England) Burnley) |
| 9 | FW | GRE | Georgios Koutsias (from (United States) Chicago Fire, previously on loan) |
| 44 | DF | BRA | Carbone (from (Brazil) Flamengo) |

Out:

| No. | Pos. | Nation | Player |
|---|---|---|---|
| 15 | GK | GRE | Fotis Pseftis (on loan to (Germany) Alemannia Aachen) |
| 20 | MF | CIV | Ousmane Doumbia (to Yverdon-Sport) |
| 22 | DF | MAR | Ayman El Wafi (to (Morocco) Wydad AC) |
| 97 | FW | MTQ | Alexandre Parsemain (on loan to (France) Caen) |
| — | FW | KOS | Shkelqim Vladi (on loan to Aarau, previously on loan at St. Gallen) |

=== Lausanne-Sport ===
In:

| No. | Pos. | Nation | Player |
|---|---|---|---|
| 6 | DF | SWE | Theo Bergvall (from (Sweden) Djurgården) |
| 78 | FW | ESP | Omar Janneh (from (Spain) Atlético Madrileño) |
| 80 | MF | MLI | Sékou Koné (on loan from (England) Manchester United U21) |

Out:

| No. | Pos. | Nation | Player |
|---|---|---|---|
| 5 | DF | SUI | Bryan Okoh (to (France) Auxerre) |
| 77 | FW | KSA | Muhannad Al-Saad (loan return to (Saudi Arabia) Neom) |
| 94 | GK | SUI | Tim Hottiger (on loan to Neuchâtel Xamax) |
| — | FW | AUT | Manuel Polster (to (Germany) TSV Havelse, previously on loan at Nyon) |

=== Luzern ===
In:

| No. | Pos. | Nation | Player |
|---|---|---|---|
| 4 | DF | SUI | Adrian Bajrami (from (Portugal) Benfica, previously on loan) |

Out:

| No. | Pos. | Nation | Player |
|---|---|---|---|
| 26 | MF | SUI | Iwan Hegglin (to Cham) |
| 30 | DF | KOS | Ismajl Beka (to Grasshopper) |
| 44 | GK | SUI | Diego Heller (to Cham) |

=== Zürich ===
In:

| No. | Pos. | Nation | Player |
|---|---|---|---|
| 8 | FW | POR | Ivan Cavaleiro (from (Portugal) Tondela) |
| 22 | DF | SUI | Chris Kablan (from (Cyprus) Akritas Chlorakas) |
| 23 | MF | KOS | Valon Berisha (from (Austria) LASK) |
| 42 | DF | GER | Alexander Hack (from (United States) New York Red Bulls) |

Out:

| No. | Pos. | Nation | Player |
|---|---|---|---|
| 5 | DF | ARG | Mariano Gómez (to (Hungary) Ferencváros) |
| 10 | MF | SUI | Steven Zuber (to (Greece) Atromitos) |
| 20 | DF | SUI | Calixte Ligue (to (Italy) Venezia) |
| 21 | FW | FRA | Lisandru Tramoni (free agent) |
| 23 | DF | SRB | Milan Rodić (to (Serbia) OFK Beograd) |
| 26 | FW | SUR | Jahnoah Markelo (to (England) Coventry City) |
| 40 | FW | SUI | Vincent Nvendo (to Neuchâtel Xamax) |
| — | DF | SRB | Nemanja Tošić (to (Cyprus) Anorthosis Famagusta, previously on loan at (Serbia) Čukarički) |

=== St. Gallen ===
In:

| No. | Pos. | Nation | Player |
|---|---|---|---|
| 3 | DF | GER | Colin Kleine-Bekel (on loan from (Germany) VfL Bochum) |
| 19 | FW | CRO | Antonio Verinac (from (Germany) VfB Lübeck) |
| 81 | GK | SUI | Yannick Bujard (from Wil) |

Out:

| No. | Pos. | Nation | Player |
|---|---|---|---|
| 5 | DF | GHA | Stephan Ambrosius (on loan to (Germany) Karlsruher SC) |
| 19 | FW | KOS | Shkelqim Vladi (loan return to Lugano) |
| 20 | DF | AUT | Albert Vallçi (to (Austria) Sturm Graz) |

=== Sion ===
In:

| No. | Pos. | Nation | Player |
|---|---|---|---|
| 19 | FW | SUI | Franck Surdez (from (Belgium) Gent) |
| 38 | DF | SUI | Ryan Kessler (from Aarau) |
| 40 | GK | SUI | Simon Caillet (from Basel U21, previously on loan at Concordia Basel) |

Out:

| No. | Pos. | Nation | Player |
|---|---|---|---|
| 9 | FW | POR | Dinis Rodrigues (on loan to (Portugal) Penafiel) |
| 11 | MF | FRA | Théo Bouchlarhem (to Étoile Carouge) |
| 18 | MF | HAI | Belmar Joseph (on loan to (United States) Monterey Bay) |
| 27 | DF | ITA | Gabriele Mulazzi (on loan to (Italy) Juventus Next Gen) |

=== Winterthur ===
In:

| No. | Pos. | Nation | Player |
|---|---|---|---|
| 3 | DF | SUI | Rhodri Smith (on loan from Young Boys) |
| 6 | MF | GHA | Emmanuel Essiam (on loan from Basel, previously on loan at (Belgium) Francs Borains) |
| 31 | DF | KOS | Mirlind Kryeziu (free agent) |

Out:

| No. | Pos. | Nation | Player |
|---|---|---|---|
| 66 | DF | LUX | Marvin Martins (to (Latvia) Liepāja) |
| 68 | FW | FRA | Brian Beyer (on loan to (Liechtenstein) Vaduz) |

=== Grasshopper ===
In:

| No. | Pos. | Nation | Player |
|---|---|---|---|
| 4 | DF | BIH | Luka Mikulić (from (Bosnia and Herzegovina) Posušje) |
| 19 | FW | SUI | Emmanuel Tsimba (on loan from Young Boys) |
| 20 | DF | SEN | El Bachir Ngom (from (Latvia) Riga) |
| 27 | MF | GER | Sven Köhler (from (Germany) Eintracht Braunschweig) |
| 30 | DF | KOS | Ismajl Beka (from Luzern) |
| 99 | FW | SUI | Michael Frey (from (England) Queens Park Rangers) |
| — | FW | URU | Anderson Rodríguez (from (Uruguay) Racing de Montevideo) |

Out:

| No. | Pos. | Nation | Player |
|---|---|---|---|
| 9 | FW | SUI | Nikolas Muci (on loan to (Italy) Mantova) |
| 27 | FW | ARG | Tomás Verón Lupi (on loan to (Uruguay) Nacional) |
| 51 | DF | SUI | Loris Giandomenico (on loan to Rapperswil-Jona) |
| — | DF | KOS | Florian Hoxha (on loan to Étoile Carouge, previously on loan at (Liechtenstein) Vaduz) |
| — | FW | URU | Anderson Rodríguez (on loan to Wacker Innsbruck) |
| — | MF | CAN | Mathieu Choinière (to (United States) Los Angeles FC, previously on loan) |

=== Thun ===
In:

| No. | Pos. | Nation | Player |
|---|---|---|---|
| 9 | FW | AUT | Furkan Dursun (from (Austria) Rapid Wien, previously on loan at (Austria) SKN St. Pölten) |
| 25 | GK | SUI | Tim Spycher (from Basel) |

Out:

| No. | Pos. | Nation | Player |
|---|---|---|---|
| 11 | FW | ENG | Layton Stewart (on loan to (England) AFC Wimbledon) |

== See also ==
- 2025–26 Swiss Super League
