= Fyodor Chalov =

Russian footballer (born 1998)

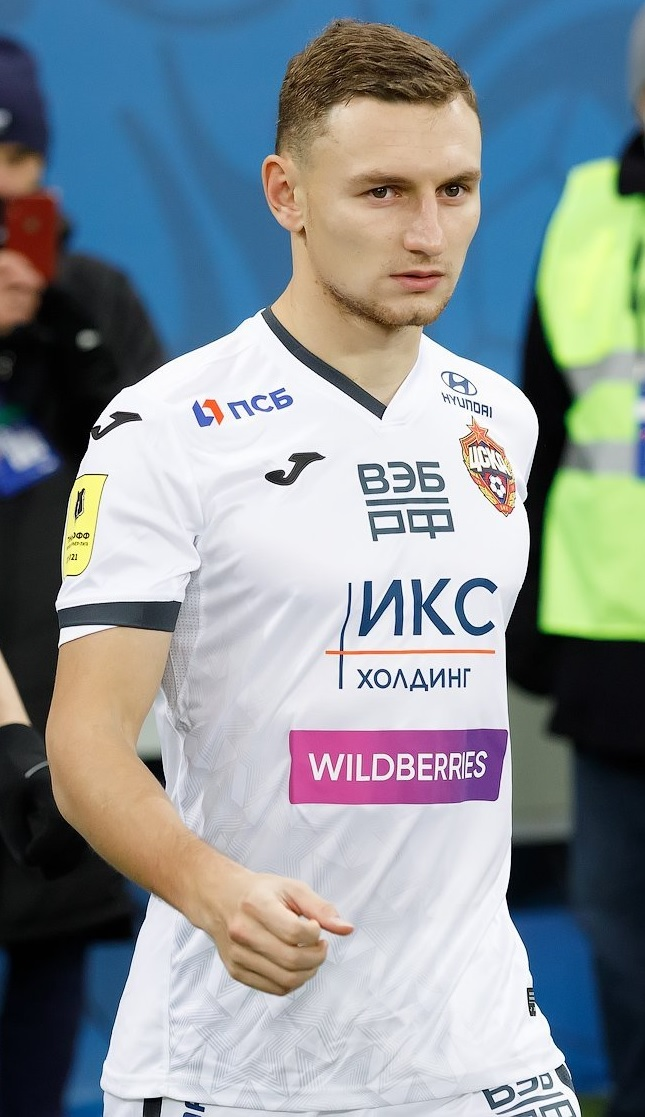
- Chalov with CSKA Moscow in 2020

Personal information
- Full name: Fyodor Nikolayevich Chalov
- Date of birth: 10 April 1998 (age 28)
- Place of birth: Moscow, Russia
- Height: 1.80 m (5 ft 11 in)
- Position: Striker

Team information
- Current team: PAOK
- Number: 9

Youth career
- 2005–2006: Yuny Dinamovets Moscow
- 2006–2015: CSKA Moscow

Senior career*
Years	Team	Apps	(Gls)
2016–2024	CSKA Moscow	199	(76)
2022	→ Basel (loan)	14	(4)
2024–	PAOK	36	(4)
2026	→ Kayserispor (loan)	8	(0)

International career^{‡}
2013	Russia U15	3	(0)
2015	Russia U17	5	(3)
2015–2016	Russia U18	12	(4)
2016	Russia U19	6	(3)
2017–2021	Russia U21	23	(11)
2019–	Russia	8	(3)
- * Club domestic league appearances and goals as of 24 May 2026 ‡ National team caps and goals as of 15 November 2024

Fyodor Nikolayevich Chalov (Russian: Фёдор Николаевич Чалов; born 10 April 1998) is a Russian professional footballer who plays as a striker for Super League Greece club PAOK and the Russia national team.

== Club career ==
=== CSKA Moscow ===
Chalov made his debut for the main squad of CSKA Moscow in the Russian Cup game against Yenisey Krasnoyarsk on 21 September 2016.

On 2 November 2016, he scored four goals for CSKA's Under-19 team in a UEFA Youth League 5–0 victory against Monaco.

Following that game, he was called up to the main squad (with the first-choice forward Lacina Traoré struggling with only 4 goals in the first 15 season games) and made his Russian Premier League debut on 6 November 2016 as a late substitute in a game against Amkar Perm. On the next matchday on 18 November 2016, he made his first starting-lineup appearance for CSKA against Arsenal Tula, and on 22 November he started their next Champions League game against Bayer Leverkusen. He scored his first goal for CSKA on 3 December 2016 in a game against Ural Yekaterinburg.

On 27 February 2017, Chalov signed a new contract with CSKA, keeping him at the club until 2020. On 12 December 2018, he scored a goal in a 3–0 win over Real Madrid in the Santiago Bernabéu Stadium. He later signed a new contract until the summer of 2022 on 22 January 2019.

After only scoring twice in his first 21 appearances of the 2020–21 season in the Russian Premier League and UEFA Europa League, he scored a hat-trick on 17 December 2020 in a 3–1 away victory over Rostov.

On 11 June 2023, Chalov scored the opening goal in a 2022–23 Russian Cup final that CSKA won in a penalty shout-out.

On 30 July 2023, Chalov scored a rare hat-trick in which all three goals were scored from a penalty kick against Akhmat Grozny to secure a 3–2 victory for CSKA.

==== Loan to Basel ====
On 1 February 2022, Chalov joined Swiss club Basel on a six month loan until the end of their 2021–22 FC Basel season under head coach Patrick Rahmen. Chalov played his domestic league debut for his new club in the home game in the St. Jakob Stadium on 6 February as Basel played a 3–3 draw against Sion. He scored his first goal for the club on 19 February in the home game in the St. Jakob Stadium against Lausanne-Sport as Basel won 3–0. His last game with Basel was on 22 May as Basel won 2–1 against Lugano. Chalov gave the assist to Darian Males' goal in the sixth minute. During his time with Basel, Chalov played a total of 19 games for Basel scoring a total of 5 goals. 14 of these games were in the Swiss Super League, two in the 2021–22 UEFA Europa Conference League and three were friendly games. He scored four goals in the domestic league, the other was scored during the test games.

=== PAOK ===
On 1 August 2024, Chalov signed a three-year contract with the Greek club PAOK. He made his debut on 13 August 2024 following a 4–3 defeat after extra time at home against Malmö in the third qualifying round of the Champions League.

== International career ==
Chalov scored three goals for the Russia U17 national team at the 2015 FIFA U-17 World Cup.

On 11 May 2018, he was included in the senior national team's extended 2018 FIFA World Cup squad, which was the first time he had been called up to the senior national team. He was not included in the finalized World Cup squad.

He made his debut for the team on 21 March 2019 in a UEFA Euro 2020 qualifier against Belgium.

== Personal life ==
His father is a research chemist, while his older brother Daniil Chalov is also a professional footballer. In his youth he excelled at piano and flute as well as football.

== Career statistics ==
=== Club ===
As of match played 6 April 2026

Appearances and goals by club, season and competition
Club	Season	League			National cup (Note: Includes Russian Cup, Greek Football Cup)		Europe		Other		Total	
Club	Season	Division	Apps	Goals	Apps	Goals	Apps	Goals	Apps	Goals	Apps	Goals
CSKA Moscow	2016–17	Russian Premier League	15	6	1	0	2 (Note: Appearances in UEFA Champions League)	0	0	0	18	6
CSKA Moscow	2017–18	Russian Premier League	20	6	1	0	10 (Note: Seven appearances in UEFA Champions League, three appearances and one goal in UEFA Europa League)	1	—		31	7
CSKA Moscow	2018–19	Russian Premier League	30	15	0	0	6	2	1 (Note: Appearance in Russian Super Cup)	0	37	17
CSKA Moscow	2019–20	Russian Premier League	30	8	3	0	6 (Note: Appearances in UEFA Europa League)	1	—		39	9
CSKA Moscow	2020–21	Russian Premier League	27	7	3	0	6	0	—		36	7
CSKA Moscow	2021–22	Russian Premier League	16	3	2	0	—		—		18	3
CSKA Moscow	2022–23	Russian Premier League	30	19	11	5	—		—		41	24
CSKA Moscow	2023–24	Russian Premier League	29	12	11	4	—		1	0	41	16
CSKA Moscow	2024–25	Russian Premier League	1	0	0	0	—		—		1	0
CSKA Moscow	Total		198	76	32	9	30	4	2	0	262	89
Basel (loan)	2021–22	Swiss Super League	14	4	—		2 (Note: Appearances in UEFA Europa Conference League)	0	—		16	4
PAOK	2024–25	Super League Greece	26	3	2	0	12 (Note: One appearance in UEFA Champions League, eleven appearances and two goals in UEFA Europa League)	2	—		40	5
PAOK	2025–26	Super League Greece	10	1	4	1	10	1	—		24	3
PAOK	Total		36	4	6	1	22	3	—		64	8
Kayserispor (loan)	2025–26	Süper Lig	8	0	0	0	—		—		8	0
Career total			256	84	38	10	54	7	2	0	350	101

=== International ===
As of match played 15 November 2024

Appearances and goals by national team and year
National team	Year	Apps	Goals
Russia	2019	2	0
Russia	2020	1	0
Russia	2022	1	0
Russia	2023	2	1
Russia	2024	2	2
Total		8	3

International goals Scores and results list Russia's goal tally first.

No.	Date	Venue	Opponent	Score	Result	Competition
1	12 October 2023	VTB Arena, Moscow, Russia	Cameroon	1–0	1–0	Friendly
2	7 June 2024	Dinamo Stadium, Minsk, Belarus	Belarus	3–0	4–0	Friendly
3.	7 June 2024	Dinamo Stadium, Minsk, Belarus	Belarus	4–0	4–0	Friendly

== Honours ==
CSKA Moscow

- Russian Cup: 2022–23
- Russian Super Cup: 2018

Individual

- Young Footballer of the Season in Russia: 2017
- Russian Premier League Top scorer: 2018–19
- Russian Premier League Forward of the Season: 2018–19
- Russian Premier League Team of the Season: 2022–23
- Russian Premier League Assist of the Season: 2023–24
