= Parsemain =

Parsemain is a French surname. Notable people with the surname include:

- Alexandre Parsemain (born 2003), footballer from Martinique
- Kévin Parsemain (born 1988), footballer from Martinique

== See also ==
- Stade Parsemain, football stadium of Istres FC
