= Tomás Tavares =

Portuguese footballer

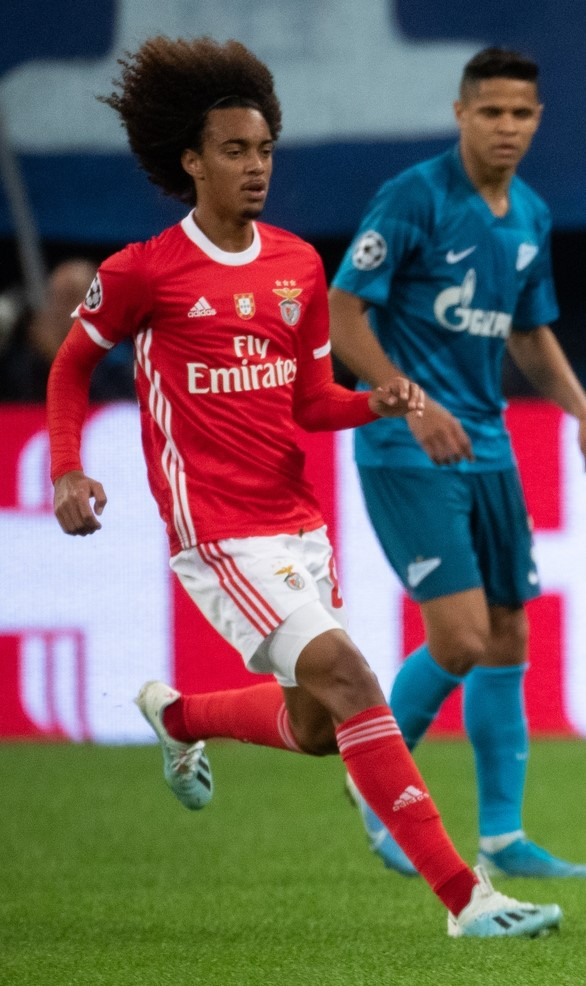
- Tavares playing for Benfica in 2019

Personal information
- Full name: Tomás Franco Tavares
- Date of birth: 7 March 2001 (age 25)
- Place of birth: Peniche, Portugal
- Height: 1.82 m (6 ft 0 in)
- Positions: Right-back; defensive midfielder

Team information
- Current team: Marítimo
- Number: 15

Youth career
- 2010–2019: Benfica

Senior career*
Years	Team	Apps	(Gls)
2019–2023	Benfica B	4	(0)
2019–2023	Benfica	12	(0)
2020–2021	→ Alavés (loan)	3	(0)
2021	→ Farense (loan)	18	(0)
2021–2022	→ Basel (loan)	18	(1)
2023–2025	Spartak Moscow	16	(0)
2024–2025	→ LASK (loan)	3	(0)
2025	AVS	11	(0)
2025–2026	Wisła Płock	13	(0)
2026–	Marítimo	0	(0)

International career
2017–2018	Portugal U17	14	(0)
2019	Portugal U18	5	(0)
2018–2019	Portugal U19	18	(0)
2019–2022	Portugal U21	9	(0)
Medal record
Men's football
Representing Portugal
UEFA European Under-21 Championship
Runner-up	2021
- * Club domestic league appearances and goals as of 18:10, 29 May 2026 (UTC)

Tomás Franco Tavares (European Portuguese: [tuˈmaʃ taˈvaɾɨʃ]; born 7 March 2001) is a Portuguese professional footballer who plays as a right-back or defensive midfielder for Primeira Liga club Marítimo.

== Club career ==
=== Benfica ===
Tavares started his football career in Benfica's youth system. He signed his first professional contract with the club on 2 July 2018. He made his professional debut with Benfica B in a 2–1 LigaPro win over Oliveirense on 23 August 2019.

On 10 September 2019, Tavares debuted for the first team as a starter in a 2–1 home loss to RB Leipzig in the UEFA Champions League. He made his Primeira Liga debut as a 12th-minute substitute in a 1–0 home win over Vitória de Setúbal on 28 September.

==== Loan to Alavés ====
On 3 October 2020, Tavares was loaned to La Liga side Alavés for the 2020–21 season. He made his first league appearance in a home match against Barcelona after coming as a substitute for Édgar Méndez in the second half. On 15 January 2021, Alavés terminated the loan of Tavares, and he returned to Benfica.

==== Loan to Farense ====
On 18 January 2021, Tavares moved to Primeira Liga club Farense on a loan until the end of the season.

=== Basel ===
On 31 August 2021 Basel announced that they had signed Tavares on a one-year loan with an option to for a definite move. Tavares joined Basel's first team for their 2021–22 season under head coach Patrick Rahmen. Tavares played his domestic league debut for the club in the away game in the Cornaredo on 12 September 2021 as Basel played a 1–1 with Lugano. He scored his first goal for the club in the home game at the St. Jakob-Park on 26 September 2021. It was the second goal of the game as Basel won 3–1 against Zürich.

Basel pulled the option to buy the player definitively. On 8 May 2022 during the match against Lausanne-Sport at the Stade de la Tuilière Tavares injured himself.

=== Spartak Moscow ===
In January 2023, Tavares signed for Russian Premier League club Spartak Moscow on a three-and-a-half-year deal. He made his official debut on 23 February 2023 in a 0-1 cup win against Lokomotiv Moscow. In June 2023, while at the Portugal national under-21 football team camp, Tavares suffered an ACL tear, which became his second similar injury in 13 months. The recovery took several months and he was not registered with the Russian Premier League as a Spartak player for the first half of the 2023–24 season. Spartak registered him for the squad once again in February 2024. He returned to play on 13 April 2024 in a game against Sochi.

On 23 July 2024, Tavares joined Austrian Bundesliga club LASK on a season-long loan deal.

On 15 January 2025, his Spartak contract was terminated by mutual consent.

=== AVS ===
On 21 January 2025, Tavares joined AVS until the end of the season.

=== Wisła Płock ===
On 30 August 2025, Tavares signed for Polish Ekstraklasa club Wisła Płock on a one-year deal, with an option for another two years.

== International career ==
Tavares is a youth international for Portugal, having represented the nation's under-19 team.

== Personal life ==
Born in Peniche, Portugal, Tavares is of Cape Verdean descent.

== Career statistics ==
As of match played 10 May 2026

Appearances and goals by club, season and competition
Club	Season	League			National cup (Note: Includes Taça de Portugal, Copa del Rey, Swiss Cup, Russian Cup, Austrian Cup, Polish Cup)		League cup (Note: Includes Taça da Liga)		Europe		Other		Total	
Club	Season	Division	Apps	Goals	Apps	Goals	Apps	Goals	Apps	Goals	Apps	Goals	Apps	Goals
Benfica B	2018–19	Liga Portugal 2	0	0	—		—		—		—		0	0
Benfica B	2019–20	Liga Portugal 2	1	0	—		—		—		—		1	0
Benfica B	2020–21	Liga Portugal 2	3	0	—		—		—		—		3	0
Benfica B	Total		4	0	—		—		—		—		4	0
Benfica	2019–20	Primeira Liga	12	0	4	0	3	0	7 (Note: Five appearances in UEFA Champions League, two appearances in UEFA Europa League)	0	—		26	0
Alavés (loan)	2020–21	La Liga	3	0	2	0	—		—		—		5	0
Farense (loan)	2020–21	Primeira Liga	18	0	0	0	—		—		—		18	0
Basel (loan)	2021–22	Swiss Super League	18	1	2	0	—		8 (Note: Appearances in UEFA Europa Conference League)	0	—		28	1
Spartak Moscow	2022–23	Russian Premier League	13	0	5	1	—		—		—		18	1
Spartak Moscow	2023–24	Russian Premier League	3	0	1	0	—		—		—		4	0
Spartak Moscow	Total		16	0	6	1	—		—		—		22	1
LASK (loan)	2024–25	Austrian Bundesliga	3	0	1	0	—		0	0	—		4	0
AVS	2024–25	Primeira Liga	11	0	—		—		—		1 (Note: Appearance in Primeira Liga promotion/relegation play-offs)	0	12	0
Wisła Płock	2025–26	Ekstraklasa	13	0	1	0	—		—		—		14	0
Career total			98	1	16	1	3	0	15	0	1	0	133	2
