= Sergio López (footballer, born 1999) =

German footballer

Personal information
- Full name: Sergio López Galache
- Date of birth: 8 April 1999 (age 27)
- Place of birth: Remscheid, Germany
- Height: 1.79 m (5 ft 10 in)
- Position: Right-back

Team information
- Current team: Granada
- Number: 18

Youth career
- 2007–2013: Salamanca
- 2013–2016: Santa Marta
- 2016–2018: Real Madrid

Senior career*
Years	Team	Apps	(Gls)
2018–2021	Real Madrid B	41	(0)
2020–2021	→ Valladolid B (loan)	24	(0)
2020–2021	→ Valladolid (loan)	0	(0)
2021–2024	Basel	55	(3)
2024–2026	Darmstadt 98	59	(3)
2026–	Granada	0	(0)
- * Club domestic league appearances and goals as of 18 May 2026

Sergio López Galache (born 8 April 1999) is a German professional footballer who plays as a right-back for Segunda División club Granada.

== Early life ==
López was born in Remscheid, Germany, to German-born parents of Spanish descent; all four of his grandparents are Spanish. He holds both German and Spanish passports, and moved to Spain at the age of 4. In 2007, he began playing football with the academy of Salamanca before moving to the youth department of Santa Marta. In 2016 he again moved, joining the youth academy of Real Madrid.

== Career ==
=== Real Madrid ===
López began his senior career with the Real Madrid B side in the Tercera División. He joined Valladolid Promesas for the 2020–21 season. He made an appearance with the senior Real Valladolid side, in a 5–0 Copa del Rey win over CD Cantolagua on 15 December 2020.

=== Basel ===
On 23 June 2021, Swiss team Basel announced that they had signed López from Real Madrid. He had signed a three-year professional contract, keeping him at the club until summer 2024. After playing in five test games, López played his professional debut for the club on 22 July 2021, in a 3–0 win at the St. Jakob-Park in the 2021–22 UEFA Europa Conference League against Partizani. He played his domestic league debut for the club in the away in game in the Letzigrund on 25 July, a 2–0 win over Grasshopper Club.

López scored his first league goal for his new club one week later in the home game on 1 August 2021, a 6–1 routing of Sion. This season López totaled 40 appearances and scored two goals.

On 28 September 2022, López suffered a rupture of the anterior syndesmotic ligament on his right foot, only returning to action at the end of January. He still managed to feature in 37 matches, scoring once. At the beginning of their 2023–24 season, López suffered an anterior cruciate ligament rupture, being sidelined until the end of the year.

=== Darmstadt 98 ===
On 7 June 2024, López agreed to join 2. Bundesliga side Darmstadt 98 on the expiry of his contract with Basel, officially joining the German side on 1 July.

=== Granada ===
On 24 July 2026, López returned to his native country, after signing for Segunda División side Granada CF.

== Career statistics ==
=== Club ===
As of match played 23 August 2023

Appearances and goals by club, season and competition
Club	Season	League			National Cup (Note: Includes Copa del Rey, Swiss Cup)		Europe		Other		Total	
Club	Season	Division	Apps	Goals	Apps	Goals	Apps	Goals	Apps	Goals	Apps	Goals
Real Madrid Castilla	2018–19	Segunda División B	28	0	—		—		—		28	0
Real Madrid Castilla	2019–20	Segunda División B	13	0	—		—		—		13	0
Real Madrid Castilla	Total		41	0	—		—		—		41	0
Real Valladolid B	2020–21	Segunda División B	24	0	—		—		—		24	0
Real Valladolid (loan)	2020–21	LaLiga	0	0	1	0	—		—		1	0
Basel	2021–22	Super League	29	2	3	0	8 (Note: Appearance(s) in UEFA Conference League)	0	—		40	2
Basel	2022–23	Super League	21	1	4	0	12	0	—		37	1
Basel	Total		50	3	7	0	20	0	—		77	3
Career total			115	3	8	0	20	0	—		143	3
