= Darian Maleš =

Swiss footballer (born 2001)

Personal information
- Date of birth: 3 May 2001 (age 25)
- Place of birth: Lucerne, Switzerland
- Height: 1.88 m (6 ft 2 in)
- Position: Forward

Team information
- Current team: Widzew Łódź
- Number: 19

Youth career
- 2008–2019: Luzern

Senior career*
Years	Team	Apps	(Gls)
2018–2020	Luzern II	16	(2)
2019–2020	Luzern	19	(1)
2020–2023	Inter Milan	0	(0)
2020	→ Genoa (loan)	0	(0)
2021–2023	→ Basel (loan)	72	(9)
2021–2022	→ Basel II (loan)	1	(1)
2023–2026	Young Boys	89	(16)
2025	Young Boys II	1	(1)
2026–	Widzew Łódź	0	(0)

International career
2016	Switzerland U16	2	(0)
2017	Switzerland U17	1	(0)
2019	Switzerland U18	2	(0)
2019–2020	Switzerland U19	7	(4)
2021–2023	Switzerland U21	17	(0)
- * Club domestic league appearances and goals as of 14 May 2026

Darian Maleš (Serbian Cyrillic: Дариан Малеш; born 3 May 2001) is a Swiss professional footballer who plays as a forward for Ekstraklasa club Widzew Łódź.

== Career ==
=== FC Luzern ===
On 13 June 2019, Maleš signed his first professional contract with his childhood club FC Luzern. He made his professional debut for Luzern in a 1–0 Swiss Super League win over Neuchâtel Xamax on 26 September 2019.

=== Inter Milan ===
On 16 September 2020, Maleš signed five-year contract with the Italian team Inter Milan. Nine days later, he joined Genoa on a six-month loan contract. He made one appearance for Genoa in Coppa Italia.

==== Loan to FC Basel ====
On 15 February 2021, Maleš moved on a six-month loan to Swiss Super League side FC Basel. He joined Basel's first team during the winter break of their 2020–21 season under head coach Ciriaco Sforza. Maleš played his domestic league debut for the club in the home game in the St. Jakob-Park five days later, on 20 February, as Basel played a goalless draw with Lausanne-Sport. He scored his first goal for the club on 3 March in the home game as Basel played a 1–1 draw with the Young Boys. At the end of the season the loan came to an end and Maleš then returned to Inter Milan.

However, on 9 July 2021, Maleš returned to Basel for their 2021–22 season under their new head coach Patrick Rahmen for a further two-year loan, with an option for the club of a definitive purchase. In the 2022–23 UEFA Europa Conference League Basel advanced as far as the semi-finals, but here they were defeated by Fiorentina. Nevertheless, on 8 June 2023, the club announced that they declined to trigger their buy option. Thus he departed Basel after nearly two and a half years on loan. During his time with the club, Maleš played a total of 119 games for Basel scoring a total of 20 goals. 72 of these games were in the Swiss Super League, six in the Swiss Cup, 28 in the UEFA Conference League and 13 were friendly games. He scored nine goals in the domestic league, five in the cup, five in the European games and the other was scored during the test games.

=== Young Boys ===
On 19 July 2023, he permanently signed with Swiss double winners BSC Young Boys. He signed a four-year contract, valid until summer 2027.

=== Widzew Łódź ===
On 24 August 2026, Maleš left Young Boys after three years to join Polish club Widzew Łódź on a three-year contract, with an option to extend.

== Personal life ==
Born in Switzerland, Maleš is of Bosnian Serb descent.

== Career statistics ==
As of match played 14 May 2026

Appearances and goals by club, season and competition
Club	Season	League			National cup (Note: Includes Swiss Cup, Coppa Italia)		Europe		Other		Total	
Club	Season	Division	Apps	Goals	Apps	Goals	Apps	Goals	Apps	Goals	Apps	Goals
Luzern II	2018–19	Swiss 1. Liga	12	2	—		—		—		12	2
Luzern II	2019–20	Swiss 1. Liga	4	0	—		—		—		4	0
Luzern II	Total		16	2	—		—		—		16	2
Luzern	2019–20	Swiss Super League	19	1	2	1	—		—		21	2
Inter Milan	2020–21	Serie A	0	0	0	0	0	0	—		0	0
Inter Milan	2021–22	Serie A	0	0	0	0	0	0	0	0	0	0
Inter Milan	2022–23	Serie A	0	0	0	0	0	0	0	0	0	0
Inter Milan	Total		0	0	0	0	0	0	0	0	0	0
Genoa (loan)	2020–21	Serie A	0	0	1	0	—		—		1	0
Basel (loan)	2020–21	Swiss Super League	16	2	0	0	—		—		16	2
Basel (loan)	2021–22	Swiss Super League	28	3	2	1	13 (Note: Appearances in UEFA Europa Conference League)	2	—		43	6
Basel (loan)	2022–23	Swiss Super League	28	4	4	4	15	3	—		47	11
Basel (loan)	Total		72	9	6	5	28	5	—		106	19
Basel II (loan)	2021–22	Swiss Promotion League	1	1	—		—		—		1	1
Young Boys	2023–24	Swiss Super League	31	3	4	0	9 (Note: Seven appearances in UEFA Champions League, two appearances in UEFA Europa League)	0	—		44	3
Young Boys	2024–25	Swiss Super League	28	6	3	3	9 (Note: Appearances in UEFA Champions League)	0	—		40	9
Young Boys	2025–26	Swiss Super League	30	7	2	0	8 (Note: Appearances in UEFA Europa League)	1	—		40	8
Young Boys	Total		89	16	9	3	26	1	—		124	20
Young Boys II	2024–25	Swiss Promotion League	1	1	—		—		—		1	1
Widzew Łódź	2026–27	Ekstraklasa	0	0	0	0	—		—		0	0
Career totals			198	30	18	9	54	6	0	0	270	45

== Honours ==
Young Boys

- Swiss Super League: 2023–24
