= Liam Chipperfield =

Swiss footballer (born 2004)

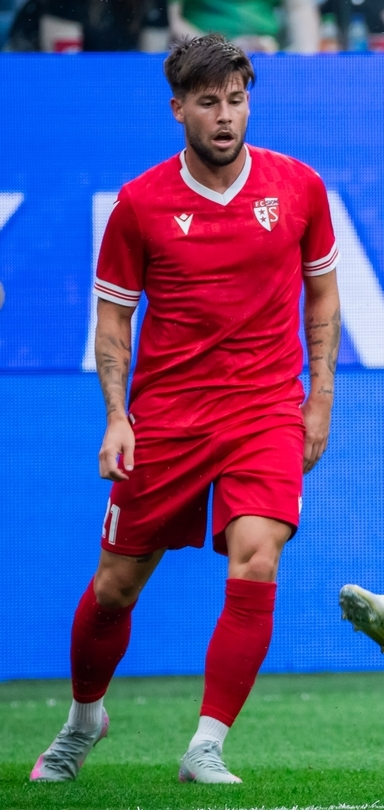

Personal information
- Full name: Liam Scott Chipperfield
- Date of birth: 14 February 2004 (age 22)
- Place of birth: Basel, Switzerland
- Height: 1.78 m (5 ft 10 in)
- Position: Winger

Team information
- Current team: Sion
- Number: 21

Youth career
- 2013–2020: Basel

Senior career*
Years	Team	Apps	(Gls)
2020–2023	Basel II	41	(6)
2021–2023	Basel	5	(1)
2023–	Sion II	2	(1)
2023–	Sion	90	(12)

International career^{‡}
2019–2020	Switzerland U16	6	(2)
2021–2022	Switzerland U18	4	(0)
2022–2023	Switzerland U19	4	(0)
2024	Switzerland U20	4	(0)
2025–	Switzerland U21	10	(2)
- * Club domestic league appearances and goals as of 28 September 2026 ‡ National team caps and goals as of 31 March 2026

Liam Scott Chipperfield (born 14 February 2004) is a Swiss professional footballer who plays as a winger for FC Sion in the Swiss Super League.

== Club career ==
=== FC Basel ===
Chipperfield started his youth football with Basel in 2013. He went through all the junior levels before advancing to their U-18 team in July 2019. In the 2020–21 U-18 Elite League Chipperfield played eight games scoring five goals leading the team to the table top. He advanced to their first team during their 2020–21 season under head coach Ciriaco Sforza. Chipperfield made his match debut in the test match against FC Schaffhausen in mid-November 2020. The youngster scored the first goal of the match as they took an early lead in the 4–0 win.

On 4 December 2020, FC Basel announced that Chipperfield had signed his first professional contract with the club. With the professional contract Chipperfield advanced to Basel's U-21 team and in his first five games scored three goals, two of which were in the game against Chiasso on 13 September 2021.

Chipperfield made his first-team debut on 19 September in the second round of the Swiss Cup as Basel won 3–0 in the match against FC Rorschach-Goldach 17. He scored his first goal for the first team on 13 March 2022 in a 2-0 win against Servette FC.

=== FC Sion ===
On 17 July 2023, he departed Basel to join freshly relegated FC Sion in the Swiss Challenge League, despite having a contract until November 2023.

== International career ==
Chipperfield has also played for various U-national teams. He made his debut for the U-15 on 16 April 2019 against Wales U15 and his debut in the Swiss U-16 on 24 September in the match against Italy U-16. He scored a goal in the return match two days later as the Swiss won by three goals to one. On 1 July 2021 he advanced to the Swiss U-18 team, for whom he has played twice to date.

== Personal life ==
Liam, who holds both Swiss and Australian nationality, is the son of Australian Scott Chipperfield, who has celebrated seven league championship titles with the FC Basel between 2001 and 2012 and helped to shape an era.

On the 25th of January 2024, Liam acquired Australian citizenship, making him eligible to represent Australia.
