= Adrian Durrer =

Swiss footballer (born 2001)

Personal information
- Date of birth: 13 July 2001 (age 25)
- Place of birth: Basel, Switzerland
- Height: 1.87 m (6 ft 2 in)
- Position: Defender

Team information
- Current team: Rapperswil-Jona
- Number: 5

Youth career
- 2010–2020: Basel

Senior career*
Years	Team	Apps	(Gls)
2020–2021	Basel II	16	(1)
2021–2022	Basel	1	(1)
2022–2024	Lugano	17	(0)
2022–2024	Lugano II	9	(2)
2022–2023	→ Bellinzona (loan)	7	(0)
2024	→ Winterthur (loan)	13	(0)
2024–2026	Winterthur	36	(0)
2025	Winterthur II	1	(0)
2026–	Rapperswil-Jona	0	(0)

International career^{‡}
2018	Switzerland U18	2	(0)
- * Club domestic league appearances and goals as of 18 September 2026 ‡ National team caps and goals as of 16:21, 17 May 2022 (UTC)

Adrian Durrer (born 13 July 2001) is a Swiss footballer who plays as a defender for Swiss Challenge League club Rapperswil-Jona.

== Club career ==
On 24 June 2020, Durrer signed a professional contract with FC Basel. He made his professional debut with Basel in a 4–1 Swiss Super League win over FC Luzern on 13 March 2021, and scored his side's fourth goal in his debut in the 95th minute.

On 6 January 2022, he signed with Ticinesi Super League club Lugano. Durrer signed a contract with Lugano until 30 June 2026. He gave his debut as part of the starting lineup on 29 January 2022 in a 0–1 defeat against reigning Swiss champions BSC Young Boys.

On 27 January 2023, Durrer moved on loan to Bellinzona for the rest of the season.

On 14 February 2024, Durrer was loaned by Winterthur.

== Honours ==
Lugano

- Swiss Cup: 2021–22
