= Carmine Chiappetta =

Swiss footballer (born 2003)

Personal information
- Full name: Carmine Soel Chiappetta
- Date of birth: 9 March 2003 (age 23)
- Place of birth: Wetzikon, Switzerland
- Height: 1.75 m (5 ft 9 in)
- Position: Forward

Team information
- Current team: Schaffhausen
- Number: 97

Youth career
- 2012–2013: Lionem Zürich
- 2013: Oerlikon/Polizei Zürich
- 2013–2015: Grasshopper
- 2015–2016: Rafzerfeld
- 2016–2018: Schaffhausen
- 2018–2021: Basel

Senior career*
Years	Team	Apps	(Gls)
2020–2023	Basel	4	(0)
2021	Basel U21	12	(0)
2022–2023	→ Winterthur (loan)	10	(0)
2022–2023	→ Winterthur U21 (loan)	18	(7)
2023–2026	Winterthur	14	(0)
2023–2026	Winterthur U21	22	(6)
2025	→ Schaffhausen (loan)	16	(4)
2026–	Schaffhausen	8	(3)

International career
2017–2018	Switzerland U15	7	(1)
2018–2019	Switzerland U16	5	(1)
2019	Switzerland U17	2	(1)
2021	Switzerland U19	7	(2)
2022	Switzerland U20	3	(0)
- * Club domestic league appearances and goals as of 26 September 2026

Carmine Soel Chiappetta (born 9 March 2003) is a Swiss professional footballer who plays as a forward for Swiss Promotion League club Schaffhausen.

== Club career ==
A youth academy graduate of Basel, Chiappetta made his professional debut on 21 November 2020 in a 2–1 league defeat against Young Boys.

On 20 January 2022, Chiappetta was loaned to Winterthur until the summer of 2023. On 14 April 2023, Wintherthur exercised the option to make the transfer permanent and signed a long-term contract with Chiappetta.

On 27 December 2024, Chiappetta agreed to join Schaffhausen on loan for the remainder of the 2024–25 season.

== International career ==
Chiappetta is a current Swiss youth international.
