= Alexandre Parsemain =

French footballer

Personal information
- Full name: Alexandre Nicolas Duville-Parsemain
- Date of birth: 27 May 2003 (age 23)
- Place of birth: Fort-de-France, Martinique, France
- Height: 1.85 m (6 ft 1 in)
- Position: Forward

Team information
- Current team: Moreirense
- Number: 9

Youth career
- 2011–2013: Stade Spiritain
- 2013–2018: Aiglon Lamentin
- 2018–2019: Sportifs 2 Cœur
- 2019–2020: Istres
- 2020–2021: Nice

Senior career*
Years	Team	Apps	(Gls)
2021–2023	Nice B	29	(10)
2023–2024	Dijon B	19	(11)
2024–2025	Dijon	35	(12)
2025–2026	Lugano	9	(0)
2026	→ Caen (loan)	17	(5)
2026–	Moreirense	6	(1)

International career^{‡}
2025–	Martinique	4	(0)
- * Club domestic league appearances and goals as of 20 September 2026 ‡ National team caps and goals as of 28 September 2026

Alexandre Nicolas Duville-Parsemain (born 27 May 2003) is a French footballer who plays as a forward for Portuguese Primeira Liga club Moreirense and the Martinique national team.

== Club career ==
Born in Fort-de-France on the island of Martinique in the French West Indies, Parsemain began playing as a youth for Stade Spiritain and Aiglon du Lamentin on his native island. He moved to Metropolitan France in 2018 to play for Sportifs 2 Cœur, and Istres a year later. In July 2020, he moved to Nice on a youth contract.

In July 2023, Parsemain signed for Dijon for their under-19 team and reserve team in the fifth-tier Championnat National 3. In 2023–24, he played 19 games and scored 11 goals, including four braces, and was rewarded with his first professional contract. With the first team in the third-tier Championnat National in 2024–25, he played 31 games and was the club's top scorer with 10 goals.

On 24 June 2025, Parsemain signed a three-year contract with Lugano of the Swiss Super League. On 8 January 2026, after nine goalless appearances, he returned to France's third division and joined Caen on loan. He scored five goals in 17 games for the club managed by Gaël Clichy.

Parsemain moved to Moreirense in the Portuguese Primeira Liga on 2 July 2026, on a four-year contract. He made his debut on 9 August in a 2–2 home draw with Minho rivals Braga and assisted a goal by Nile John. On 14 September, he scored his first goal as a penalty in a 3–1 win over Marítimo also at the Parque de Jogos Comendador Joaquim de Almeida Freitas.

== International career ==
On 15 November 2025, Parsemain made his debut for the Martinique national team in a 2–0 friendly loss against Cuba.
