= Tim Spycher =

Swissfootballer (born 2002)

Personal information
- Date of birth: 13 April 2004 (age 22)
- Place of birth: Wettingen, Switzerland
- Height: 1.87 m (6 ft 2 in)
- Position: Goalkeeper

Team information
- Current team: Thun
- Number: 25

Youth career
- 2012–2013: FC Meisterschwanden
- 2013–2015: Wohlen
- 2015–2021: Basel

Senior career*
Years	Team	Apps	(Gls)
2021–2026	Basel U21	31	(0)
2022–2023	→ Yverdon-Sport (loan)	2	(0)
2023–2024	→ Baden (loan)	32	(0)
2024–2025	→ Stade Nyonnais (loan)	12	(0)
2026–	Thun	3	(0)

International career
2019	Switzerland U15	2	(0)
2019	Switzerland U16	1	(0)
2021–2022	Switzerland U18	4	(0)
2022	Switzerland U19	7	(0)
2023–2024	Switzerland U20	3	(0)
2025	Switzerland U21	2	(0)
- * Club domestic league appearances and goals as of 26 May 2026

Tim Spycher (born 13 April 2004) is a Swiss professional footballer who plays as a goalkeeper for Swiss Super League club Thun.

== Club career ==
Spycher is a product of the youth academies of the Swiss clubs FC Meisterschwanden, Wohlen and Basel. On 13 June 2022, he extended his contract with Basel until 2026, and joined Yverdon-Sport on a season-long loan in the Swiss Challenge League. On 10 June 2023, he joined Baden on a season-long loan. On 13 June 2023, he again went on loan for a season, this time with Stade Nyonnais. On 8 January 2026, he transferred to Thun on a contract until 2028, with an option for another season. He helped Thun win their first ever first division title, the 2025–26 Swiss Super League.

== International career ==
Spycher is a youth international for Switzerland. He was called up to the Switzerland U21s for a set of 2027 UEFA European Under-21 Championship qualification matches in November 2025.

== Honours ==
Yverdon-Sport

- Swiss Challenge League: 2022–23

Thun

- Swiss Super League: 2025–26
