= Emmanuel Essiam =

Ghanaian footballer (born 2003)

Personal information
- Date of birth: 19 December 2003 (age 22)
- Place of birth: Accra, Ghana
- Height: 1.83 m (6 ft 0 in)
- Position: Midfielder

Team information
- Current team: Winterthur (on loan from Basel)
- Number: 6

Senior career*
Years	Team	Apps	(Gls)
2021–2022	Berekum Chelsea	20	(0)
2022–	Basel II	9	(0)
2022–	Basel	8	(0)
2023	→ Stade Lausanne Ouchy (loan)	7	(0)
2025	→ Aarau (loan)	11	(0)
2025–2026	→ Francs Borains (loan)	5	(0)
2026–	→ Winterthur (loan)	2	(0)

International career^{‡}
2021	Ghana U20	6	(0)
2021	Ghana U23	2	(0)
- * Club domestic league appearances and goals as of 26 May 2026 ‡ National team caps and goals as of 00:39, 2 January 2023 (UTC)

Emmanuel Essiam (born 19 December 2003) is a Ghanaian professional footballer who plays as a midfielder for Swiss Challenge League club Winterthur, on loan from Basel.

== Club career ==
In January 2022, having represented Berekum Chelsea in the Ghana Premier League, Essiam moved to Switzerland to join Basel. Shortly after joining, Essiam suffered an injury, keeping him out of first team action. He got over his injury and started training with Basel on 7 October 2022. On 7 September 2023, Essiam was loaned to Stade Lausanne Ouchy.

On 3 January 2025, Essiam moved on loan to Aarau in the second-tier Swiss Challenge League. He returned to Basel at the end of the season. On 19 August 2025, Essiam was loaned by Francs Borains in the Belgian second tier. On 17 February 2026, his loan in Belgium was cut short and he returned to Switzerland, joining relegation-threatened side FC Winterthur in the Swiss Super League on loan for the remainder of the season.

== International career ==
Essiam represented the Ghanaian under-20 side at the 2021 Africa U-20 Cup of Nations, winning the competition. He also played in a friendly against the Japan under-23s.

== Personal life ==
Emmanuel Essiam was born and raised in Ghana. On 3 January 2022, Basel discovered his talent and transferred with high hopes.

== Career statistics ==
=== Club ===
As of 2 January 2023

Appearances and goals by club, season and competition
Club	Season	League			Cup		Continental		Other		Total	
Club	Season	Division	Apps	Goals	Apps	Goals	Apps	Goals	Apps	Goals	Apps	Goals
Berekum Chelsea	2020–21	Ghana Premier League	13	0	0	0	–		0	0	13	0
Berekum Chelsea	2021–22	Ghana Premier League	7	0	0	0	–		0	0	7	0
Berekum Chelsea	Total		20	0	0	0	0	0	0	0	20	0
Basel	2021–22	Swiss Super League	0	0	0	0	0	0	0	0	0	0
Basel	2022–23	Swiss Super League	0	0	0	0	0	0	0	0	0	0
Basel	Total		0	0	0	0	0	0	0	0	0	0
Career total			20	0	0	0	0	0	0	0	20	0

== Honours ==
Ghana U20

- Africa U-20 Cup of Nations: 2021
