= 2026–27 Grasshopper Club Zurich season =

Grasshopper Club Zurich
2026–27 season
- Chairman: Ludovic Deléchat
- Manager: Peter Zeidler
- Stadium: Letzigrund, Zürich, Switzerland
- Swiss Super League: TBD
- Swiss Cup: TBD
Home colours	Away colours	Third colours
- All statistics correct as of 22 July 2026.

The 2026–27 Grasshopper Club Zurich season is the club's sixth season back in the Swiss Super League, after winning promotion in 2021 and avoiding relegation by winning last season's relegation play-off. The season will start on 25 July 2026. Grasshoppers will also participate in the Swiss Cup.

== Squad ==
=== Players ===
As of 7 September 2026

No.	Name	Nationality	Pos	Date of birth (age)	at GCZ since	Apps	Goals	Former club
Goalkeepers
1	Marvin Hübel	(Switzerland)	GK	1 March 2003 (age 23)	07/2026	0	0	Aarau
45	Eron Avdullahu	(Switzerland)	GK	17 February 2007 (age 19)	07/2026	0	0	own youth
71	Justin Hammel	(Switzerland)	GK	2 December 2000 (age 25)	06/2022	91	0	Lausanne-Ouchy
Defenders
4	Luka Mikulić	(Bosnia and Herzegovina) (Croatia)	CB	7 May 2005 (age 21)	01/2026	16	0	HŠK Posušje
15	Abdoulaye Diaby	(Mali)	CB	4 June 2000 (age 26)	09/2025	20	0	St. Gallen
22	Pantaleo Creti	(Italy) (Uganda)	RB	22 July 2008 (age 18)	07/2025	6	2	AC Monza U17
25	John Hilton	(United States) (Brazil)	LB	15 June 2001 (age 25)	09/2026	0	0	FC Dordrecht
28	Simone Stroscio	(Switzerland)	DM	20 August 2003 (age 23)	10/2021	43	2	own youth
34	Allan Arigoni	(Switzerland)	RB	4 November 1998 (age 28)	07/2025	103	3	FC Lugano
44	Bujar Pllana	(Albania) (Kosovo)	CB	29 October 2001 (age 25)	08/2026	0	0	Lechia Gdańsk
57	Nico Rissi	(Switzerland)	LB	8 August 2002 (age 24)	12/2025	5	0	own youth
58	Yannick Bettkober	(Germany) (Cameroon)	CB	18 March 2005 (age 21)	04/2025	7	0	own youth
73	Dorian Paloschi	(Italy)	CB	21 November 2005 (age 20)	07/2025	14	0	AC Milan U20
Midfielders
5	Imourane Hassane	(Benin)	DM	8 April 2003 (age 23)	01/2025	51	1	Loto-Popo FC
6	Amir Abrashi	(Albania) (Switzerland)	CM	27 March 1990 (age 36)	06/2021	289	11	Basel
8	Tim Meyer	(Switzerland)	CM	8 July 2004 (age 22)	07/2023	88	3	own youth
10	Óscar Clemente	(Spain)	CM	26 March 1999 (age 27)	08/2025	25	2	Levante
11	Giotto Morandi	(Switzerland)	AM	4 March 1999 (age 27)	08/2026	157	25	Servette
16	Matteo Mantini	(Italy)	CM	27 August 2007 (age 19)	07/2025	15	0	Inter Milan U18
17	Samuel Krasniqi	(Switzerland)	LW	3 January 2005 (age 21)	11/2025	28	1	own youth
23	Samuel Marques	(Switzerland)	CM	4 February 2005 (age 21)	04/2024	31	1	own youth
31	Maximilian Ullmann	(Austria)	LB	17 June 1996 (age 30)	11/2025	22	3	Wolfsberger AC
55	Dominik Papic	(Switzerland)	CM	14 May 2008 (age 18)	04/2026	3	1	own youth
56	Denis Sahin	(Switzerland)	CM	23 June 2008 (age 18)	04/2026	2	0	own youth
66	Manex Guibelalde	(Spain)	DM	22 April 2004 (age 22)	08/2026	0	0	Athletic Bilbao B
Forwards
7	Luke Plange	(England)	ST	4 November 2002 (age 24)	07/2025	29	10	Crystal Palace
9	Nikolas Muci	(Switzerland)	ST	8 February 2003 (age 23)	07/2024	60	13	Lugano
18	Lee Young-jun	(South Korea)	ST	23 May 2003 (age 23)	07/2024	42	7	Suwon FC
20	Diego Ferrazza	(Italy)	ST	4 May 2007 (age 19)	08/2026	0	0	Spezia Calcio
60	Samuele Bengondo	(Switzerland) (Italy)	ST	22 December 2005 (age 20)	10/2025	1	0	AC Taverne
81	Julian von Moos	(Switzerland)	RW	1 April 2001 (age 25)	08/2026	0	0	Servette
Players on loan
11	Salifou Diarrassouba	(Ivory Coast) (Burkina Faso)	LW	20 December 2001 (age 24)	07/2025	28	0	ASEC Mimosas
14	Alieu Conateh	(The Gambia)	LW	28 December 2006 (age 19)	07/2026	1	0	Gambinos Stars Africa
27	Tomás Verón Lupi	(Argentina) (Italy)	RW	3 September 2000 (age 26)	09/2024	33	3	RC Montevideo
30	Ismajl Beka	(Kosovo) (Switzerland)	CB	31 October 1999 (age 27)	01/2026	4	0	Luzern
51	Loris Giandomenico	(Switzerland) (Italy)	LB	28 September 2005 (age 21)	07/2025	16	0	own youth
Players departed during the season
3	Saulo Decarli	(Switzerland)	CB	4 February 1992 (age 34)	06/2024	35	1	Eintracht Braunschweig
21	Leart Kabashi	(Switzerland)	CM	29 November 2007 (age 18)	01/2025	6	1	own youth

=== Coaching staff ===
As of 4 May 2026

Position	Name	Since
Head coach	(Germany) Peter Zeidler	05/2026
Assistant coach	(Albania) Shkëlzen Gashi	03/2026
Athletic coach	(Switzerland) Jörg Mikoleit	06/2024
Goalie Coach	(Switzerland) Andreas Hilfiker	07/2025
Video analyst	(Switzerland) Claudio Spiegel	07/2025

== Transfers ==
Permanent signing Loan transfer

=== In ===
Date	No.	Pos	Player	Transferred from	Fee/notes	Ref.
1 July 2026	9	FW	(Switzerland) Nikolas Muci	(Italy) Mantova 1911	Loan return	
1 July 2026	14	FW	(The Gambia) Alieu Conateh	(Austria) SKU Amstetten	Loan return	
1 July 2026	51	DF	(Switzerland) Loris Giandomenico	(Switzerland) Rapperswil-Jona	Loan return	
1 July 2026	73	DF	(Kosovo) Florian Hoxha	(Switzerland) Étoile Carouge	Loan return	
16 July 2026	1	GK	(Switzerland) Marvin Hübel	(Switzerland) Aarau	Undisclosed fee	
5 August 2026	20	FW	(Italy) Diego Ferrazza	(Italy) Spezia Calcio U19	€200,000	
12 August 2026	44	DF	(Albania) Bujar Pllana	(Poland) Lechia Gdansk	Free transfer	
14 August 2026	81	FW	(Switzerland) Julian von Moos	(Switzerland) Servette	Undisclosed fee	
15 August 2026	11	MF	(Switzerland) Giotto Morandi	(Switzerland) Servette	Undisclosed fee	
18 August 2026	66	MF	(Spain) Manex Guibelalde	(Spain) Athletic Bilbao B	Undisclosed fee	
7 September 2026	25	DF	(United States) John Hilton	(Netherlands) Dordrecht	Free transfer	
8 September 2026	24	MF	(Netherlands) Kenzo Goudmijn	(England) Derby County	Loan with buy option	

=== Out ===
Date	No.	Pos	Player	Transferred to	Fee/notes	Ref.
18 June 2026	99	FW	(Switzerland) Michael Frey	(Belgium) Royal Antwerp	Mutual contract dissolution	
30 June 2026	1	GK	(Switzerland) Nicolas Glaus	(Germany) RW Oberhausen	Contract exiry	
30 June 2026	2	DF	(Netherlands) Dirk Abels	Free agent	Contract exiry	
30 June 2026	10	FW	(Denmark) Jonathan Asp Jensen	(Germany) Bayern Munich	Loan return	
30 June 2026	14	MF	(Croatia) Lovro Zvonarek	(Germany) Bayern Munich	Loan return	
30 June 2026	19	FW	(Switzerland) Emmanuel Tsimba	(Switzerland) Young Boys	Loan return	
30 June 2026	50	GK	(Kosovo) Laurent Seji	(Switzerland) Lausanne-Ouchy	Contract exiry	
30 June 2026	73	DF	(Kosovo) Florian Hoxha	(Switzerland) Étoile Carouge	Contract exiry	
6 July 2026	11	MF	(Ivory Coast) Salifou Diarrassouba	(Switzerland) Rapperswil-Jona	Loan	
13 July 2026	20	DF	(Senegal) El Bachir Ngom	(Belgium) KAA Gent	€2,700,000	
17 July 2026	27	MF	(Germany) Sven Köhler	Free agent	Mutual contract dissolution	
31 August 2026	3	DF	(Switzerland) Saulo Decarli	Retired		
1 September 2026	51	DF	(Switzerland) Loris Giandomenico	(Germany) Greuther Fürth	Loan with buy option	
3 September 2026	21	MF	(Switzerland) Leart Kabashi	(Scotland) Heart of Midlothian	Undisclosed fee	
3 September 2026	14	FW	(The Gambia) Alieu Conateh	Austria Lustenau	Loan with buy option	
7 September 2026	30	DF	(Kosovo) Ismajl Beka	(Switzerland) Rapperswil-Jona	Loan	
8 September 2026	—	FW	(Uruguay) Anderson Rodríguez	(Austria) Wacker Innsbruck	Undisclosed fee	

== Absences ==
=== Injuries and other Absences ===
Past Ongoing

Start	End	No.	Pos	Player	Reason/Injury	#	Ref.

=== Suspensions ===
Yellow card accumulation Yellow-red card suspension Direct red card suspension

Date	No.	Pos	Player	Note	#	Ref.
21 May 2026	18	FW	(South Korea) Lee Young-jun	Violent conduct	3	
8 August 2026	5	MF	(Benin) Imourane Hassane	Yellow-red card	3	

== Competitions ==
=== Overview ===
Competition	First match	Last match	Starting round	Final position	Record							
Competition	First match	Last match	Starting round	Final position	Pld	W	D	L	GF	GA	GD	Win %
Super League	25 July 2026	30 May 2027	Matchday 1	TBD	8	2	2	4	12	19	−7	25.00
Swiss Cup	15 August 2026	TBD	Round 1	TBD	1	1	0	0	5	0	+5	100.00
Total					9	3	2	4	17	19	−2	33.33

Last updated: 15 September 2026
Source: Spielplan

=== Swiss Super League ===
==== League Table ====
Pos	Team	Pld	W	D	L	GF	GA	GD	Pts	Qualification or relegation (Note: Teams play each other three times (33 matches), before the league is split into two groups (the top six and the bottom six).)
8	Luzern	12	3	4	5	19	25	−6	13	
9	Thun	11	3	1	7	19	30	−11	10	
10	Vaduz	12	3	1	8	24	25	−1	10	
11	Grasshopper	12	2	4	6	15	28	−13	10	Qualification for the Relegation play-off
12	Lausanne-Sport	11	1	3	7	7	17	−10	6	Relegation to 2027–28 Swiss Challenge League

Updated to match(es) played on 31 October 2026. Source: Brack Super League - Tabelle
Rules for classification: 1) Points; 2) Goal difference; 3) Goals scored; 4) Head-to-head goal difference; 5) Head-to-head goals scored 6) Away goals scored; 7) Draw.

==== Statistics ====
Overall								Home						Away					
Pld	W	D	L	GF	GA	GD	Pts	W	D	L	GF	GA	GD	W	D	L	GF	GA	GD
8	2	2	4	12	19	−7	8	1	1	2	7	11	−4	1	1	2	5	8	−3

Last updated: 15 September 2026.
Source: Spielplan

Results by Round

#	1	2	3	4	5	6	7	8	9	10	11	12	13	14	15	16	17	18	19	20	21	22
Ground	A	H	A	A	H	Z	A	H	A	H	A	H	H	A	H	A	Z	H	A	H	H	A
Result	D	L	L	L	W	D	W	L														
Position	7	9	10	12	11	11	8	9														
Points	1	1	1	1	4	5	8	8														

Updated to match(es) played on 15 September 2026. Source: Spielplan
A = Away; H = Home; W = Win; D = Draw; L = Loss; Z = Zürich Derby

==== Results ====
As of 15 September 2026

Win Draw Loss

25 July 2026 1	Lausanne-Sport	1–1	Grasshopper	Stade de la Tuilière, Lausanne
18:00 CEST (UTC+2)	Bah Mendes 33'	Report	81' Bengondo	Attendance: 5,878; Referee: Luca Piccolo; Assistant referees: Hijrim Qovanaj (VAR)

2 August 2026 2	Grasshopper	1–4	Lugano	Letzigrund, Zürich
16:30 CEST (UTC+2)	Plange 22'	Report		Attendance: 6,083; Referee: Marijan Drmic; Assistant referees: Mirel Turkes (VAR)

8 August 2026 3	Servette	2–1	Grasshopper	Stade de Genève, Lancy
20:30 CEST (UTC+2)		Report	12' Abrashi; (yellow card) 18' (yellow-red card) 59' Hassane	Attendance: 6,410; Referee: Hyseyin Sanli; Assistant referees: Mirel Turkes (VAR)

30 August 2026 5	Vaduz	5–2	Grasshopper	Rheinpark Stadion, Vaduz
16:30 CEST (UTC+2)		Report	35' Lee; 45+2' Muci	Attendance: 4,426; Referee: Logan Berchier; Assistant referees: Anojen Kanagasingam (VAR)

2 September 2026 6	Grasshopper	2–0	St. Gallen	Letzigrund, Zürich
20:30 CEST (UTC+2)	Abrashi 36'; Lee 69'	Report		Attendance: 5,925; Referee: Hajrim Qovanaj; Assistant referees: Fedayi San (VAR)

5 September 2026 7	Grasshopper	2–2	Zürich	Letzigrund, Zürich
20:30 CEST (UTC+2)	Krasniqi 58'; Pllana 90+6'	Report		Attendance: 17,142; Referee: Johannes von Mandach; Assistant referees: Michèle Schmölzer (VAR)

12 September 2026 8	Thun	0–1	Grasshopper	Stockhorn Arena, Thun
18:00 CEST (UTC+2)	Bürki (red card) 38'	Report	23' Bengondo	Attendance: 8,295; Referee: Anojen Kanagasingam; Assistant referees: Sven Wolfensberger (VAR)

15 September 2026 4	Grasshopper	2–5	Sion	Letzigrund, Zürich
19:00 CEST (UTC+2)	Krasniqi 42' (pen.); Morandi 49'	Report		Attendance: 3,983; Referee: Fedayi San; Assistant referees: Sandro Schärer (VAR)
Note: Originally scheduled for 23 August 2026 and postponed to 15 September 2026 to allow FC Sion rest for their matches in UEFA Conference League qualifying.

19 September 2026 9	Luzern	v	Grasshopper	Swissporarena, Luzern
18:00 CEST (UTC+2)		Report

11 October 2026 10	Grasshopper	v	Young Boys	Letzigrund, Zürich
14:00 CEST (UTC+2)		Report

25 October 2026 11	Basel	v	Grasshopper	St. Jakob-Park, Basel
16:30 CEST (UTC+2)		Report

31 October 2026 12	Grasshopper	v	Vaduz	Letzigrund, Zürich
18:00 CEST (UTC+2)		Report

7 November 2026 13	Grasshopper	v	Lausanne-Sport	Letzigrund, Zürich
18:00 CET (UTC+1)		Report

21 November 2026 14	Lugano	v	Grasshopper	AIL Arena, Lugano
20:30 CET (UTC+1)		Report

28 November 2026 15	Grasshopper	v	Basel	Letzigrund, Zürich
18:00 CET (UTC+1)		Report

6 December 2026 16	St. Gallen	v	Grasshopper	Sitterstadion, St. Gallen
16:30 CET (UTC+1)		Report

12 December 2026 17	Zürich	v	Grasshopper	Letzigrund, Zürich
18:00 CET (UTC+1)		Report

19 December 2026 18	Grasshopper	v	Luzern	Letzigrund, Zürich
18:00 CET (UTC+1)		Report

17 January 2027 19	Sion	v	Grasshopper	Stade de Tourbillon, Sion
16:30 CET (UTC+1)		Report

23 January 2027 20	Grasshopper	v	Servette	Letzigrund, Zürich
20:30 CET (UTC+1)		Report

30 January 2027 21	Grasshopper	v	Thun	Letzigrund, Zürich
18:00 CET (UTC+1)		Report

7 February 2027 22	Young Boys	v	Grasshopper	Stadion Wankdorf, Bern
16:30 CET (UTC+1)		Report

=== Swiss Cup ===
As of 15 August 2026

Win Draw Loss
