= 2025–26 Grasshopper Club Zurich season =

Grasshopper Club Zurich
2025–26 season
- Chairman: John Thorrington
- Manager: Peter Zeidler
- Stadium: Letzigrund, Zürich, Switzerland
- Swiss Super League: 11th
- Swiss Cup: Semi-final
- Top goalscorer: League: Luke Plange (9); All: Luke Plange (10)
- Highest home attendance: 17,329 (vs. FCZ, 4 Okt '25)
- Lowest home attendance: 2,958 (vs. SER, 6 Dec '25)
- Average home league attendance: 6,811
- Biggest win: 6–2 (vs. YB, 17 Dec '25)
- Biggest defeat: 0–6 (vs. LUZ, 2 Nov '25)
| Home colours | Away colours |
- All statistics correct as of 21 May 2026.

The 2025–26 Grasshopper Club Zurich season is the club's fifth season back in the Swiss Super League, after winning promotion in 2021 and avoiding relegation by winning last season's relegation play-off. The season will start on 20 July 2024. Grasshoppers will also participate in the Swiss Cup. For the third consecutive year, Grasshopper will participate in the relegation play-off.

== Squad ==
=== Players ===
As of 30 June 2026

| No. | Name | Nationality | Pos | Date of birth (age) | at GCZ since | Apps | Goals | Former club |
Goalkeepers
| 1 | Nicolas Glaus | (Switzerland) | GK | 10 May 2002 (age 24) | 06/2023 | 3 | 0 | Stuttgart II |
| 50 | Laurent Seji | (Kosovo) (Switzerland) | GK | 22 June 2004 (age 22) | 06/2024 | 0 | 0 | own youth |
| 71 | Justin Hammel | (Switzerland) | GK | 2 December 2000 (age 25) | 06/2022 | 91 | 0 | Lausanne-Ouchy |
Defenders
| 2 | Dirk Abels | (Netherlands) | RB | 13 June 1997 (age 29) | 07/2023 | 95 | 5 | Sparta Rotterdam |
| 3 | Saulo Decarli | (Switzerland) | CB | 4 February 1992 (age 34) | 06/2024 | 35 | 1 | Eintracht Braunschweig |
| 4 | Luka Mikulić | (Bosnia and Herzegovina) (Croatia) | CB | 7 May 2005 (age 21) | 01/2026 | 16 | 0 | HŠK Posušje |
| 15 | Abdoulaye Diaby | (Mali) | CB | 4 June 2000 (age 26) | 09/2025 | 20 | 0 | St. Gallen |
| 20 | El Bachir Ngom | (Senegal) | CB | 12 May 2000 (age 26) | 02/2026 | 18 | 1 | Riga FC |
| 22 | Pantaleo Creti | (Italy) (Uganda) | RB | 22 July 2008 (age 18) | 07/2025 | 6 | 2 | AC Monza U17 |
| 28 | Simone Stroscio | (Switzerland) | DM | 20 August 2003 (age 23) | 10/2021 | 43 | 2 | own youth |
| 30 | Ismajl Beka | (Kosovo) (Switzerland) | CB | 31 October 1999 (age 26) | 01/2026 | 4 | 0 | Luzern |
| 34 | Allan Arigoni | (Switzerland) | RB | 4 November 1998 (age 27) | 07/2025 | 103 | 3 | FC Lugano |
| 57 | Nico Rissi | (Switzerland) | lB | 8 August 2002 (age 24) | 12/2025 | 5 | 0 | own youth |
| 58 | Yannick Bettkober | (Germany) (Cameroon) | CB | 18 March 2005 (age 21) | 04/2025 | 7 | 0 | own youth |
| 73 | Dorian Paloschi | (Italy) | CB | 21 November 2005 (age 20) | 07/2025 | 14 | 0 | AC Milan U20 |
Midfielders
| 5 | Imourane Hassane | (Benin) | DM | 8 April 2003 (age 23) | 01/2025 | 51 | 1 | Loto-Popo FC |
| 6 | Amir Abrashi | (Albania) (Switzerland) | CM | 27 March 1990 (age 36) | 06/2021 | 289 | 11 | Basel |
| 8 | Tim Meyer | (Switzerland) | CM | 8 July 2004 (age 22) | 07/2023 | 88 | 3 | own youth |
| 10 | Jonathan Asp Jensen | (Denmark) | AM | 14 January 2006 (age 20) | 07/2025 | 40 | 9 | Bayern Munich (on loan) |
| 11 | Salifou Diarrassouba | (Ivory Coast) (Burkina Faso) | LW | 20 December 2001 (age 24) | 07/2025 | 28 | 0 | ASEC Mimosas |
| 14 | Lovro Zvonarek | (Croatia) | AM | 8 May 2005 (age 21) | 07/2025 | 29 | 2 | Bayern Munich (on loan) |
| 16 | Matteo Mantini | (Italy) | CM | 27 August 2007 (age 19) | 07/2025 | 15 | 0 | Inter Milan U18 |
| 17 | Óscar Clemente | (Spain) | CM | 26 March 1999 (age 27) | 08/2025 | 25 | 2 | Levante |
| 21 | Leart Kabashi | (Switzerland) | CM | 29 November 2007 (age 18) | 01/2025 | 6 | 1 | own youth |
| 27 | Sven Köhler | (Germany) | DM | 8 November 1996 (age 29) | 02/2026 | 15 | 0 | Eintracht Braunschweig |
| 31 | Maximilian Ullmann | (Austria) | LB | 17 June 1996 (age 30) | 11/2025 | 22 | 3 | Wolfsberger AC |
| 52 | Samuel Marques | (Switzerland) | CM | 4 February 2005 (age 21) | 04/2024 | 31 | 1 | own youth |
| 54 | Samuel Krasniqi | (Switzerland) | LW | 3 January 2005 (age 21) | 11/2025 | 28 | 1 | own youth |
| 55 | Dominik Papic | (Switzerland) | CM | 14 May 2008 (age 18) | 04/2026 | 3 | 1 | own youth |
| 56 | Denis Sahin | (Switzerland) | CM | 23 June 2008 (age 18) | 04/2026 | 2 | 0 | own youth |
Forwards
| 7 | Luke Plange | (England) | ST | 4 November 2002 (age 23) | 07/2025 | 29 | 10 | Crystal Palace |
| 18 | Lee Young-jun | (South Korea) | ST | 23 May 2003 (age 23) | 07/2024 | 42 | 7 | Suwon FC |
| 19 | Emmanuel Tsimba | (Switzerland) (Madagascar) | ST | 22 June 2006 (age 20) | 01/2026 | 16 | 3 | Young Boys (on loan) |
| 60 | Samuele Bengondo | (Switzerland) | ST | 22 December 2005 (age 20) | 10/2025 | 1 | 0 | AC Taverne |
| 99 | Michael Frey | (Switzerland) | ST | 19 July 1994 (age 32) | 01/2026 | 16 | 2 | Queens Park Rangers |
Players loaned out during the season
| 9 | Nikolas Muci | (Switzerland) | ST | 8 February 2003 (age 23) | 07/2024 | 60 | 13 | Lugano |
| 27 | Tomás Verón Lupi | (Argentina) (Italy) | RW | 3 September 2000 (age 26) | 09/2024 | 33 | 3 | RC Montevideo |
| 50 | Laurent Seji | (Kosovo) (Switzerland) | GK | 22 June 2004 (age 22) | 06/2024 | 0 | 0 | own youth |
| 51 | Loris Giandomenico | (Switzerland) (Italy) | LB | 28 September 2005 (age 21) | 07/2025 | 16 | 0 | own youth |
| 54 | Joachim Williamson | (Switzerland) | LB | 5 November 2007 (age 18) | 12/2024 | 0 | 0 | own youth |
| — | Florian Hoxha | (Kosovo) (Switzerland) | LB | 22 February 2001 (age 25) | 07/2021 | 29 | 1 | own youth |
Players departed during the season
| 4 | Grayson Dettoni | (United States) (Italy) | CB | 29 June 2005 (age 21) | 01/2025 | 0 | 0 | Bayern Munich (on loan) |
| 19 | Mathieu Choinière | (Canada) | CM | 7 February 1999 (age 27) | 08/2024 | 18 | 1 | CF Montréal |
| 20 | Evans Maurin | (France) | ST | 30 March 2001 (age 25) | 07/2024 | 17 | 1 | Yverdon-Sport |
| 26 | Maksim Paskotši | (Estonia) | CB | 19 January 2003 (age 23) | 09/2023 | 61 | 2 | Tottenham Hotspur |

=== Coaching staff ===
As of 4 May 2026

| Position | Name | Since |
|---|---|---|
| Head coach | (Germany) Peter Zeidler | 05/2026 |
| Assistant coach | (Albania) Shkëlzen Gashi | 03/2026 |
| Athletic coach | (Switzerland) Jörg Mikoleit | 06/2024 |
| Goalie Coach | (Switzerland) Andreas Hilfiker | 07/2025 |
| Video analyst | (Switzerland) Claudio Spiegel | 07/2025 |

== Transfers ==
=== In ===
Permanent signing Loan transfer

| Date | No. | Pos | Player | Transferred from | Fee/notes | Ref. |
|---|---|---|---|---|---|---|
| 24 June 2025 | — | C | (Austria) Gerald Scheiblehner | (Austria) BW Linz | | |
| 24 June 2025 | — | AC | (Austria) Toni Mestrovic | (Austria) BW Linz | | |
| 24 June 2025 | — | AC | (Austria) Alexander Zellhofer | (Austria) ASKÖ Oedt | | |
| 25 June 2025 | 27 | FW | (Argentina) Tomás Verón Lupi | (Uruguay) RC Montevideo | Activated buy option | |
| 26 June 2025 | 10 | FW | (Denmark) Jonathan Asp Jensen | (Germany) Bayern Munich | Loan | |
| 30 June 2025 | 34 | DF | (Switzerland) Allan Arigoni | (Switzerland) Lugano | Free transfer | |
| 2 July 2025 | 16 | MF | (Italy) Matteo Mantini | (Italy) Inter Milan U18 | | |
| 2 July 2025 | 22 | DF | (Italy) Pantaleo Creti | (Italy) AC Monza U17 | | |
| 15 July 2025 | 11 | MF | (Ivory Coast) Salifou Diarrassouba | (Ivory Coast) ASEC Mimosas | | |
| 17 July 2025 | 7 | FW | (England) Luke Plange | (England) Crystal Palace | | |
| 24 July 2025 | 73 | DF | (Italy) Dorian Paloschi | (Italy) AC Milan U20 | | |
| 29 July 2025 | 14 | MF | (Croatia) Lovro Zvonarek | (Germany) Bayern Munich | Loan | |
| 7 August 2025 | — | FW | (The Gambia) Alieu Conateh | (Germany) Bayern Munich Academy | Academy signing | |
| 14 August 2025 | 60 | FW | (Switzerland) Samuele Bengondo | (Switzerland) AC Taverne | Academy signing | |
| 21 August 2025 | 17 | MF | (Spain) Óscar Clemente | (Spain) UD Levante | Free transfer | |
| 5 September 2025 | 15 | DF | (Mali) Abdoulaye Diaby | (Switzerland) St. Gallen | Free transfer | |
| 22 September 2025 | 59 | FW | (Republic of Ireland) Tom Bloxham | (England) Blackburn Rovers | Academy signing | |
| 12 November 2025 | 31 | DF | (Austria) Maximilian Ullmann | Free agent | Free signing | |
| 1 January 2026 | 30 | DF | (Kosovo) Ismajl Beka | (Switzerland) Luzern | Undisclosed fee | |
| 1 January 2026 | 73 | DF | (Kosovo) Florian Hoxha | (Liechtenstein) Vaduz | Loan return | |
| 1 January 2026 | 50 | GK | (Kosovo) Laurent Seji | (Switzerland) Rapperswil-Jona | Loan return | |
| 3 January 2026 | 19 | FW | (Switzerland) Emmanuel Tsimba | (Switzerland) Young Boys | Loan | |
| 6 January 2026 | 4 | DF | (Bosnia and Herzegovina) Luka Mikulić | (Bosnia and Herzegovina) HŠK Posušje | €500,000 | |
| 20 January 2026 | — | FW | (Uruguay) Anderson Rodríguez | (Uruguay) RC Montevideo | Undisclosed fee | |
| 26 January 2026 | 99 | FW | (Switzerland) Michael Frey | (England) Queens Park Rangers | Undisclosed fee | |
| 5 February 2026 | 20 | DF | (Senegal) El Bachir Ngom | (Latvia) Riga | €600,000 | |
| 9 February 2026 | 27 | MF | (Germany) Sven Köhler | (Germany) Eintracht Braunschweig | €300,000 | |
| 16 March 2026 | — | C | (Austria) Gernot Messner | (Switzerland) Grasshopper Club Zürich II | | |
| 16 March 2026 | — | AC | (Albania) Shkëlzen Gashi | (Switzerland) Grasshopper Club Zürich II | | |
| 16 March 2026 | — | AC | (Bosnia and Herzegovina) Daniel Pavlović | (Switzerland) Grasshopper Club Zürich II | | |
| 4 May 2026 | — | C | (Germany) Peter Zeidler | (Switzerland) Lausanne | | |

=== Out ===
Permanent departure Loan transfer

| Date | No. | Pos | Player | Transferred to | Fee/notes | Ref. |
|---|---|---|---|---|---|---|
| 21 June 2025 | — | C | (Germany) Tomas Oral | Free Agent | Contract expiry | |
| 23 June 2025 | 22 | DF | (Germany) Benno Schmitz | (Germany) Bayern Munich II | Transfer | |
| 24 June 2025 | — | AC | (Germany) Michael Henke | Free Agent | Contract expiry | |
| 24 June 2025 | — | AC | (Switzerland) Giuseppe Morello | Free Agent | Contract expiry | |
| 30 June 2025 | 7 | MF | (Germany) Tsiy-William Ndenge | (Singapore) Lion City Sailors | Contract expiry | |
| 30 June 2025 | 8 | MF | (Germany) Sonny Kittel | Free Agent | Contract expiry | |
| 30 June 2025 | 10 | MF | (Switzerland) Giotto Morandi | (Switzerland) Servette | Contract expiry | |
| 30 June 2025 | 11 | MF | (Switzerland) Pascal Schürpf | Retirement | Contract expiry | |
| 30 June 2025 | 15 | DF | (Japan) Ayumu Seko | (France) Le Havre | Contract expiry | |
| 30 June 2025 | 29 | GK | (Austria) Manuel Kuttin | Austria Klagenfurt | Contract expiry | |
| 30 June 2025 | 16 | DF | (Sweden) Noah Persson | (Switzerland) Young Boys | Loan return | |
| 30 June 2025 | 25 | FW | (The Gambia) Adama Bojang | (France) Stade Reims | Loan return | |
| 30 June 2025 | 27 | FW | (France) Bryan Lasme | (Germany) Schalke 04 | Loan return | |
| 30 June 2025 | 66 | FW | (Australia) Nestory Irankunda | (Germany) Bayern Munich | Loan return | |
| 30 June 2025 | 55 | MF | (Switzerland) Damian Nigg | (United States) Chicago Fire II | Free transfer | |
| 30 June 2025 | 57 | FW | (Switzerland) Tuğra Turhan | (Turkey) Başakşehir | Free transfer | |
| 15 July 2025 | 73 | DF | (Kosovo) Florian Hoxha | (Liechtenstein) Vaduz | Loan | |
| 18 July 2025 | 77 | MF | (Switzerland) Filipe de Carvalho | (Switzerland) Rapperswil-Jona | Free transfer | |
| 28 July 2025 | 19 | MF | (Canada) Mathieu Choinière | (United States) Los Angeles FC | Loan | |
| 1 August 2025 | 4 | DF | (United States) Grayson Dettoni | (Germany) Bayern Munich II | Loan cancellation | |
| 4 August 2025 | 26 | DF | (Estonia) Maksim Paskotši | (Belgium) Gent | Undisclosed fee | |
| 7 August 2025 | — | FW | (The Gambia) Alieu Conateh | (Austria) SKU Amstetten | Loan | |
| 27 August 2025 | 20 | FW | (France) Evans Maurin | (France) Grenoble | Undisclosed fee | |
| 28 August 2025 | 54 | DF | (Switzerland) Joachim Williamson | (Italy) Inter Milan Primavera | Loan + option | |
| 28 November 2025 | 50 | FW | (Kosovo) Laurent Seji | (Switzerland) Rapperswil-Jona | Loan | |
| 9 December 2025 | 19 | MF | (Canada) Mathieu Choinière | (United States) Los Angeles FC | Activated buy option | |
| 4 January 2026 | 27 | FW | (Argentina) Tomás Verón Lupi | (Uruguay) Nacional | Loan + option | |
| 19 January 2026 | 51 | DF | (Switzerland) Loris Giandomenico | (Switzerland) Rapperswil-Jona | Loan | |
| 20 January 2026 | — | FW | (Uruguay) Anderson Rodríguez | (Austria) Wacker Innsbruck | Loan | |
| 21 January 2026 | — | DF | (Kosovo) Florian Hoxha | (Switzerland) Étoile Carouge | Loan | |
| 3 February 2026 | 9 | FW | (Switzerland) Nikolas Muci | (Italy) Mantova 1911 | Loan + option | |
| 16 March 2026 | — | C | (Austria) Gerald Scheiblehner | Free Agent | Termination | |
| 16 March 2026 | — | AC | (Austria) Toni Mestrovic | Free Agent | Termination | |
| 16 March 2026 | — | AC | (Austria) Alexander Zellhofer | Free Agent | Termination | |
| 4 May 2026 | — | C | (Austria) Gernot Messner | (Switzerland) Grasshopper Club Zürich II | End of interim period | |

== Absences ==
=== Injuries and other Absences ===
Past Ongoing

| Start | End | No. | Pos | Player | Reason/Injury | # | Ref. |
|---|---|---|---|---|---|---|---|
| 27 May 2025 | 11 August 2025 | 18 | FW | (South Korea) Lee Young-jun | Back injury | 3 (Note: Only includes games of the current season) | |
| 16 July 2025 | 1 October 2025 | 21 | MF | (Switzerland) Leart Kabashi | Metatarsal bone fracture | 8 | |
| 30 July 2025 | 1 October 2025 | 6 | MF | (Albania) Amir Abrashi | Muscular injury | 8 | |
| 2 October 2025 | 8 February 2026 | 18 | FW | (South Korea) Lee Young-jun | Metatarsal bone fracture | TBD | |
| 10 October 2025 | 20 October 2025 | 8 | MF | (Switzerland) Tim Meyer | Torn hamstring | 1 | |
| 16 October 2025 | 19 January 2026 | 6 | MF | (Albania) Amir Abrashi | Thigh injury | TBD | |
| 17 October 2025 | 9 November 2025 | 15 | DF | (Mali) Abdoulaye Diaby | Thigh injury | 5 | |
| 23 October 2025 | TBD | 60 | FW | (Switzerland) Samuele Bengondo | Quadriceps rupture, operation, and recovery | TBD | |
| 7 November 2025 | TBD | 73 | DF | (Italy) Dorian Paloschi | Ankle ligament rupture and operation | TBD | |
| 7 November 2025 | TBD | 58 | DF | (Germany) Yannick Bettkober | Ankle ligament injury | TBD | |
| 12 November 2025 | 28 November 2025 | 10 | MF | (Denmark) Jonathan Asp Jensen | Adductor muscle injury | 1 | |
| 15 December 2025 | 5 January 2026 | 5 | MF | (Benin) Imourane Hassane | International duty (AFCON 2025) | 2 | |
| 15 December 2025 | 9 January 2026 | 15 | DF | (Mali) Abdoulaye Diaby | International duty (AFCON 2025) | 2 | |
| 8 February 2026 | 14 March 2026 | 14 | MF | (Croatia) Lovro Zvonarek | Broken toe | 7 | |
| 11 February 2026 | TBD | 3 | DF | (Switzerland) Saulo Decarli | Knee injury | TBD | |
| 21 March 2026 | TBD | 7 | FW | (England) Luke Plange | Ankle injury | TBD | |
| 6 April 2026 | TBD | 15 | DF | (Mali) Abdoulaye Diaby | Knee injury | TBD | |
| 15 April 2026 | TBD | 17 | MF | (Spain) Óscar Clemente | Clavicle fracture and operation | TBD | |
| 15 April 2026 | 26 April 2026 | 28 | DF | (Switzerland) Simone Stroscio | Ankle ligament rupture | 1 | |
| 6 May 2026 | 31 May 2026 (Note: Until end of season) | 28 | DF | (Switzerland) Simone Stroscio | Medial knee injury | 5 | |

=== Suspensions ===
Yellow card accumulation Yellow-red card suspension Direct red card suspension

| Date | No. | Pos | Player | Note | # | Ref. |
|---|---|---|---|---|---|---|
| 27 September 2025 | 73 | DF | (Italy) Dorian Paloschi | Yellow-red card | 1 | |
| 4 October 2025 | 7 | FW | (England) Luke Plange | Violent conduct | 3 (Note: Confirmed on appeal on 10 October 2025) | |
| 19 October 2025 | 3 | DF | (Switzerland) Saulo Decarli | Denial of a goalscoring opportunity | 1 | |
| 25 October 2025 | 16 | MF | (Italy) Matteo Mantini | Yellow-red card | 1 | |
| 8 November 2025 | 5 | MF | (Benin) Imourane Hassane | 4th yellow card | 1 | |
| 23 November 2025 | 28 | DF | (Switzerland) Simone Stroscio | Yellow-red card | 1 | |
| 23 November 2025 | 52 | MF | (Switzerland) Samuel Marques | Yellow-red card | 1 | |
| 29 November 2025 | 2 | DF | (Netherlands) Dirk Abels | 4th yellow card | 1 | |
| 18 January 2026 | 30 | DF | (Kosovo) Ismajl Beka | Serious foul play | 2 | |
| 3 February 2026 | 2 | DF | (Netherlands) Dirk Abels | 2nd yellow card | 1 (Note: Swiss Cup only) | |
| 3 February 2026 | 28 | DF | (Switzerland) Simone Stroscio | 2nd yellow card | 1 | |
| 10 February 2026 | 15 | DF | (Mali) Abdoulaye Diaby | 4th yellow card | 1 | |
| 14 February 2026 | 17 | MF | (Spain) Óscar Clemente | 4th yellow card | 1 | |
| 14 February 2026 | 28 | DF | (Switzerland) Simone Stroscio | 4th yellow card | 1 | |
| 1 March 2026 | 15 | DF | (Mali) Abdoulaye Diaby | Denial of a goalscoring opportunity | 1 | |
| 5 March 2026 | 6 | MF | (Albania) Amir Abrashi | Violent conduct | 3 | |
| 8 March 2026 | 99 | FW | (Switzerland) Michael Frey | Yellow-red card | 1 | |
| 11 April 2026 | 2 | DF | (Switzerland) Dirk Abels | 4th yellow card | 1 | |
| 11 April 2026 | 8 | MF | (Switzerland) Tim Meyer | 4th yellow card | 1 | |
| 11 April 2026 | 28 | DF | (Switzerland) Simone Stroscio | 8th yellow card | 1 | |
| 11 April 2026 | 34 | DF | (Switzerland) Allan Arigoni | 4th yellow card | 1 | |
| 18 April 2026 | 27 | MF | (Germany) Sven Köhler | Denial of a goalscoring opportunity | 1 | |
| 3 May 2026 | 14 | MF | (Croatia) Lovro Zvonarek | 4th yellow card | 1 | |
| 3 May 2026 | 34 | DF | (Switzerland) Allan Arigoni | Serious foul play | 3 (Note: Confirmed on appeal on 11 May 2026) | |
| 9 May 2026 | 19 | FW | (Switzerland) Emmanuel Tsimba | Serious foul play | 3 (Note: Confirmed on appeal on 15 May 2026) | |
| 12 May 2026 | 20 | DF | (Senegal) El Bachir Ngom | 4th yellow card | 1 | |
| 12 May 2026 | 10 | MF | (Denmark) Jonathan Asp Jensen | 4th yellow card | 1 | |
| 21 May 2026 | 18 | FW | (South Korea) Lee Young-jun | Violent conduct | 3 | |

== Test Matches ==
=== Overview ===
| Competition | First match | Last match | Record | | | | | | | |
| Competition | First match | Last match | Pld | W | D | L | GF | GA | GD | Win % |
|---|---|---|---|---|---|---|---|---|---|---|
| Pre-season | 4 July 2025 | 19 July 2025 | 4 | 2 | 1 | 1 | 7 | 5 | +2 | 50.00 |
| Mid-season (Autumn) | 29 July 2025 | 12 August 2025 | 3 | 1 | 0 | 2 | 3 | 6 | −3 | 33.33 |
| Winter break | 10 January 2026 | 11 January 2026 | 1 | 0 | 0 | 1 | 1 | 7 | −6 | 0.00 |
| Total | | | 8 | 3 | 1 | 4 | 11 | 18 | −7 | 37.50 |

Last updated: 10 January 2026
Source: Testspiele

=== Pre-season ===
Grasshoppers announced their preparation for the pre-season on 10 June 2025. It includes a short training camp between 7 and 11 July in Crans-Montana, Valais as well as three test matches. The last test match of the pre-season preparation will be against Premier League side West Ham United F.C. at the GC/Campus in Niederhasli. On 10 July 2025, a test match against freshly promoted Swiss Challenge League side FC Rapperswil-Jona was announced for 16 July 2025.

| 4 July 2025 Pre-season | Grasshopper Club Zurich | 1–1 | (Liechtenstein) FC Vaduz | GC/Campus, Niederhasli |
| 18:00 CEST (UTC+2) | Muci 90+1' (pen.) | Report | 58' Beeli |

| 11 July 2025 Pre-season | FC Sion (Switzerland) | 0–3 | Grasshopper Club Zurich | Stade Saint-Jacques, Ayent |
| 14:00 CEST (UTC+2) | | Report | Cretì 2'; Plange (Note: Trial player) 45+1'; Muci 73' |

| 16 July 2025 Pre-season | Grasshopper Club Zurich | 2–1 | (Switzerland) FC Rapperswil-Jona | GC/Campus, Niederhasli |
| 18:00 CEST (UTC+2) | Plange 45' (pen.); Asp Jensen 61' | Report | 71' |

| 19 July 2025 Pre-season | Grasshopper Club Zurich | 1–3 | (England) West Ham United | GC/Campus, Niederhasli |
| 15:00 CEST (UTC+2) | Asp Jensen 66' (yellow card) 69'; Paskotši (yellow card) 73'; Paloschi (yellow card) 86' | Report | 13' Irving; (yellow card) 21' Rodriguez; 47' Marshall; 87' (pen.) Paquetá | Referee: Anojen Kanagasingam |

=== Mid-season (autumn) ===
The first mid-season test match will be a friendly against La Liga side Celta Vigo on 29 July 2025. Grasshoppers will also host German record champions FC Bayern München in the Letzigrund on 12 August 2025. On 18 November 2025, during the final international break, the team will once again play a test match against partner club FC Wacker Innsbruck.

| 29 July 2025 Mid-season | Grasshopper Club Zurich | 0–3 | (Spain) RC Celta de Vigo | GC/Campus, Niederhasli |
| 15:00 CEST (UTC+2) | | Report | 9' Moriba; 13' El-Abdellaoui; 58' Durán | Referee: Sandro Schärer |

| 12 August 2025 Mid-season | Grasshopper Club Zurich | 1–2 | (Germany) FC Bayern München | Letzigrund, Zürich |
| 11:00 CEST (UTC+2) | Giandomenico 51' (Marques) | Report | 21' Karl; 26' Kusi-Asare | Attendance: 23,691; Referee: Lionel Tschudi |

| 18 November 2025 Mid-season | Grasshopper Club Zurich | 2–1 | (Austria) FC Wacker Innsbruck | GC/Campus, Niederhasli |
| 14:30 CET (UTC+1) | Fiechter 25'; Sjögrell 45' | Report | 48' Owusu |

=== Winter Break ===
On 22 December 2025, a test match against 1. FC Nürnberg of the 2. Bundesliga was announced to be held on 10 January 2026, during the winter break.

| 10 January 2026 Mid-season | 1. FC Nürnberg (Germany) | 7–1 | Grasshopper Club Zurich | Nuremberg |
| 12:00 CET (UTC+1) | | Report | 47' Tsimba |
Note: The match duration was 135 minutes (3 x 45 minutes).

== Competitions ==
=== Overview ===
| Competition | First match | Last match | Starting round | Final position | Record | | | | | | | |
| Competition | First match | Last match | Starting round | Final position | Pld | W | D | L | GF | GA | GD | Win % |
|---|---|---|---|---|---|---|---|---|---|---|---|---|
| Super League | 25 July 2025 | 16 May 2026 | Matchday 1 | 11th | 38 | 8 | 9 | 21 | 48 | 74 | −26 | 21.05 |
| Swiss Cup | 18 August 2025 | 18 April 2026 | Round 1 | Semi-finalist | 5 | 4 | 0 | 1 | 9 | 6 | +3 | 80.00 |
| Relegation play-off | 18 May 2026 | 21 May 2026 | — | — | 2 | 1 | 1 | 0 | 2 | 1 | +1 | 50.00 |
| Total | | | | | 45 | 13 | 10 | 22 | 59 | 81 | −22 | 28.89 |

Last updated: 21 May 2026
Source: Spielplan

=== Swiss Super League ===
==== League table ====
| Pos | Team | Pld | W | D | L | GF | GA | GD | Pts | Qualification or relegation (Note: Teams play each other three times (33 matches), before the league is split into two groups (the top six and the bottom six).) |
|---|---|---|---|---|---|---|---|---|---|---|
| 8 | Servette | 38 | 13 | 14 | 11 | 71 | 63 | +8 | 53 | |
| 9 | Lausanne-Sport | 38 | 11 | 9 | 18 | 53 | 67 | −14 | 42 | |
| 10 | Zürich | 38 | 11 | 5 | 22 | 49 | 72 | −23 | 38 | |
| 11 | Grasshopper (O) | 38 | 8 | 9 | 21 | 48 | 74 | −26 | 33 | Qualification for the Relegation play-off |
| 12 | Winterthur (R) | 38 | 5 | 8 | 25 | 44 | 100 | −56 | 23 | Relegation to 2026–27 Swiss Challenge League |

Source: Brack Super League - Tabelle
Rules for classification: 1) Points; 2) Goal difference; 3) Goals scored; 4) Head-to-head goal difference; 5) Head-to-head goals scored 6) Away goals scored; 7) Draw.
(O) Play-off winners; (R) Relegated

==== Results Breakdown ====
| Competition | First match | Last match | Starting round | Final position | Record | | | | | | | |
| Competition | First match | Last match | Starting round | Final position | Pld | W | D | L | GF | GA | GD | Win % |
|---|---|---|---|---|---|---|---|---|---|---|---|---|
| Regular Season | 25 July 2025 | 12 April 2026 | Matchday 1 | 11th | 33 | 6 | 9 | 18 | 40 | 65 | −25 | 18.18 |
| Relegation Group | 25 April 2026 | 17 May 2026 | Matchday 34 | 11th | 5 | 2 | 0 | 3 | 8 | 9 | −1 | 40.00 |
| Total | | | | | 38 | 8 | 9 | 21 | 48 | 74 | −26 | 21.05 |

Last updated: 16 May 2026
Source: Spielplan

Home/Away Statistics

| Overall | | | | | | | | Home | | | | | | Away | | | | | |
| Pld | W | D | L | GF | GA | GD | Pts | W | D | L | GF | GA | GD | W | D | L | GF | GA | GD |
|---|---|---|---|---|---|---|---|---|---|---|---|---|---|---|---|---|---|---|---|
| 38 | 8 | 9 | 21 | 48 | 74 | −26 | 33 | 4 | 5 | 10 | 26 | 34 | −8 | 4 | 4 | 11 | 22 | 40 | −18 |

Last updated: 16 May 2026.
Source: Spielplan

Results by Round

| # | 1 | 2 | 3 | 4 | 5 | 6 | 7 | 8 | 9 | 10 | 11 | 12 | 13 | 14 | 15 | 16 | 17 | 18 | 19 | 20 | 21 | 22 | 23 | 24 | 25 | 26 | 27 | 28 | 29 | 30 | 31 | 32 | 33 | 34 | 35 | 36 | 37 | 38 |
|---|---|---|---|---|---|---|---|---|---|---|---|---|---|---|---|---|---|---|---|---|---|---|---|---|---|---|---|---|---|---|---|---|---|---|---|---|---|---|
| Ground | H | A | A | H | A | H | A | Z | H | A | H | A | A | H | Z | H | A | A | H | H | A | H | H | A | A | Z | H | A | H | A | A | H | A | H | H | Z | H | A |
| Result | L | L | D | D | D | W | L | W | L | L | D | L | W | D | L | L | L | W | L | L | D | D | D | L | D | L | W | L | L | L | L | L | W | L | L | L | W | W |
| Position | 7 | 10 | 10 | 10 | 8 | 8 | 10 | 9 | 10 | 11 | 11 | 11 | 11 | 11 | 11 | 11 | 11 | 11 | 11 | 11 | 11 | 11 | 11 | 11 | 11 | 11 | 11 | 11 | 11 | 11 | 11 | 11 | 11 | 11 | 11 | 11 | 11 | 11 |
| Points | 0 | 0 | 1 | 2 | 3 | 6 | 6 | 9 | 9 | 9 | 10 | 10 | 13 | 14 | 14 | 14 | 14 | 17 | 17 | 17 | 18 | 19 | 20 | 20 | 21 | 21 | 24 | 24 | 24 | 24 | 24 | 24 | 27 | 27 | 27 | 27 | 30 | 33 |

Updated to match(es) played on 16 May 2026. Source: Spielplan
A = Away; H = Home; W = Win; D = Draw; L = Loss; Z = Zürich Derby

==== Results ====
As of 16 May 2026

Win Draw Loss

| 26 July 2025 1 | Grasshopper | 2–3 | Luzern | Letzigrund, Zürich |
| 18:00 CEST (UTC+2) | Muci 5' (pen.); Plange 31'; Bettkober (yellow card) 33'; Paskotši (yellow card) 37'; Abrashi (yellow card) 90+6' | Report | 16' Di Giusto; 38' (pen.) Grbić; 69' Lucas Ferreira | Attendance: 6,872; Referee: Anojen Kanagasingam; Assistant referees: Alessandro Dudic (VAR) |

| 2 August 2025 2 | Basel | 2–1 | Grasshopper | St. Jakob-Park, Basel |
| 20:30 CEST (UTC+2) | Otele 45', 75' | Report | (yellow card) 13' Hassane; (yellow card) 24' Muci; (yellow card) 29' Decarli; 69' (Zvonarek) (yellow card) 78' Paskotši | Attendance: 25,556; Referee: Sven Wolfensberger; Assistant referees: Anojen Kanagasingam (VAR) |

| 10 August 2025 3 | Servette | 1–1 | Grasshopper | Stade de Genève, Lancy |
| 16:30 CEST (UTC+2) | Ayé (penalty missed) 56'; Fomba 74' | Report | (yellow card) 16' Stroscio; 33' Decarli; (yellow card) 74' Hammel | Attendance: 6,478; Referee: Johannes von Mandach; Assistant referees: Alessandro Dudic (VAR) |
Note: Originally scheduled for 9 August 2025 (18:00 kickoff). Rescheduled on 31 July 2025.

| 24 August 2025 4 | Grasshopper | 2–2 | Winterthur | Letzigrund, Zürich |
| 14:00 CEST (UTC+2) | Asp Jensen 12' (Marques); Abels (yellow card) 45'; Zvonarek 60' (Marques); Hassane (yellow card) 80' | Report | 68' Sidler; 90+3' Citherlet | Attendance: 7,782; Referee: Johannes von Mandach; Assistant referees: Fedayi San (VAR) |

| 30 August 2025 5 | Thun | 1–1 | Grasshopper | Stockhorn Arena, Thun |
| 18:00 CEST (UTC+2) | Reichmuth 50' | Report | (yellow card) 38' Asp Jensen; (yellow card) 80' Abels; 84' (Lee) Creti | Attendance: 8,311; Referee: Sandro Schärer; Assistant referees: Luca Piccolo (VAR) |

| 14 September 2025 6 | Grasshopper | 3–1 | Lausanne-Sport | Letzigrund, Zürich |
| 16:30 CEST (UTC+2) | Meyer (yellow card) 16'; Plange 40' (Asp Jensen); Lee 68' (pen.); Asp Jensen 74' (Meyer) | Report | (yellow card) 22' (yellow-red card) 49' Souleymane N'Diaye; 76' Al-Saad | Attendance: 4,481; Referee: Luca Cibelli; Assistant referees: Fedayi San (VAR) |

| 27 September 2025 7 | Lugano | 2–1 | Grasshopper | Stadio Cornaredo, Lugano |
| 18:00 CEST (UTC+2) | Grgić 56' (pen.); Behrens 74' | Report | (yellow card) 14' Zvonarek; (yellow card) 51' (yellow-red card) 54' Paloschi; 70' (Plange) Asp Jensen; (yellow card) 90+3' Abels | Attendance: 3,194; Referee: Nico Gianforte; Assistant referees: Anojen Kanagasingam (VAR) |

| 4 October 2025 8 | Grasshopper | 3–0 | Zürich | Letzigrund, Zürich |
| 20:30 CEST (UTC+2) | Asp Jensen 35' (Marques); Diaby (yellow card) 37'; Marques 55' (Asp Jensen); Arigoni (yellow card) 78'; Muci 82' (pen.); Plange (red card) 86' | Report | | Attendance: 17,329; Referee: Lionel Tschudi; Assistant referees: Nico Gianforte (VAR) |

| 18 October 2025 9 | Grasshopper | 0–1 | Sion | Letzigrund, Zürich |
| 14:00 CEST (UTC+2) | Decarli (red card) 12'; Muci (yellow card) 25'; Marques (yellow card) 51'; Arigoni (yellow card) 60' | Report | 61' (pen.) Rrudhani | Attendance: 6,924; Referee: Marijan Drmic; Assistant referees: Anojen Kanagasingam (VAR) |

| 25 October 2025 10 | St. Gallen | 5–0 | Grasshopper | Kybunpark, St. Gallen |
| 18:00 CEST (UTC+2) | | Report | (yellow card) 35' Stroscio; (yellow card) 42' Zvonarek; (yellow card) 49' (yellow-red card) 54' Mantini | Attendance: 19,010; Referee: Johannes von Mandach; Assistant referees: Nico Gianforte (VAR) |
Note: Originally scheduled for 20:30 kickoff. Rescheduled on 31 July 2025.

| 30 October 2025 11 | Grasshopper | 3–3 | Young Boys | Letzigrund, Zürich |
| 20:30 CEST (UTC+2) | Stroscio 16' (Asp Jensen); Muci (yellow card) 22'; Clemente 25' (Asp Jensen); Asp Jensen 74' (Diarrassouba) | Report | 27' Monteiro; 67' Fassnacht; (red card) 81' Zoukrou; 89' (pen.) Bedia; (yellow card) 79' (yellow-red card) 90+1' Janko | Attendance: 3,866; Referee: Nico Gianforte; Assistant referees: Fedayi San (VAR) |

| 2 November 2025 12 | Luzern | 6–0 | Grasshopper | Swissporarena, Luzern |
| 16:30 CET (UTC+1) | | Report | (yellow card) 17' Paloschi; (yellow card) 39' Mantini; (yellow card) 80' Hassane | Attendance: 12,272; Referee: Sven Wolfensberger; Assistant referees: Lionel Tschudi (VAR) |

| 8 November 2025 13 | Winterthur | 0–1 | Grasshopper | Stadion Schützenwiese, Winterthur |
| 18:00 CET (UTC+1) | | Report | (yellow card) 56' Clemente; (yellow card) 85' Hassane; 90+2' Muci | Attendance: 8,700; Referee: Anojen Kanagasingam; Assistant referees: Johannes von Mandach (VAR) |

| 23 November 2025 14 | Grasshopper | 1–1 | Basel | Letzigrund, Zürich |
| 16:30 CET (UTC+1) | Ullmann 13' (Muci); Marques (yellow card) 44' (yellow-red card) 74'; Stroscio (yellow card) 63' (yellow-red card) 90'; Arigoni (yellow card) 82' | Report | 33' Traoré; (yellow card) 61' (yellow-red card) 64' Bačanin | Attendance: 7,900; Referee: Luca Piccolo; Assistant referees: Alessandro Dudic |

| 29 November 2025 15 | Zürich | 1–0 | Grasshopper | Letzigrund, Zürich |
| 18:00 CET (UTC+1) | Kamberi 20'; Comenencia (yellow card) 2' (yellow-red card) 90+7'; Markelo (red card) 90+7' | Report | (yellow card) 22' Abels; (yellow card) 37' Diaby; (yellow card) 90+7' Clemente | Attendance: 17,181; Referee: Urs Schnyder; Assistant referees: Sandro Schärer (VAR) |

| 6 December 2025 16 | Grasshopper | 0–1 | Servette | Letzigrund, Zürich |
| 18:00 CET (UTC+1) | Meyer (yellow card) 28' | Report | 21' Rouiller | Attendance: 2,958; Referee: Lionel Tschudi; Assistant referees: Nico Gianforte (VAR) |

| 13 December 2025 17 | Sion | 1–0 | Grasshopper | Stade de Tourbillon, Sion |
| 18:00 CET (UTC+1) | Kololli 43' (pen.) | Report | (yellow card) 24' Meyer; (yellow card) 54' Abels; (penalty missed) 75' Asp Jensen | Attendance: 8,350; Referee: Mirel Turkes; Assistant referees: Alessandro Dudic (VAR) |

| 17 December 2025 18 | Young Boys | 2–6 | Grasshopper | Stadion Wankdorf |
| 20:30 CET (UTC+1) | Sanches 19'; Bedia 60'; Raveloson (red card) 88' | Report | 3' (Krasniqi) Asp Jensen; 14' (pen.), 85', 90' (Diarrassouba), 90+2' Plange; 33' (yellow card) 36' Clemente; (penalty missed) 72' Zvonarek | Attendance: 24,765; Referee: Alessandro Dudic; Assistant referees: Déborah Anex (VAR) |

| 21 December 2025 19 | Grasshopper | 1–2 | St. Gallen | Letzigrund, Zürich |
| 16:30 CET (UTC+1) | Zvonarek 42' (Plange); Asp Jensen (yellow card) 74'; Decarli (yellow card) 89' | Report | 28' Baldé; 48' Vandermersch | Attendance: 9,168; Referee: Sandro Schärer; Assistant referees: Mirel Turkes (VAR) |

Winter Break

| 18 January 2026 20 | Grasshopper | 1–3 | Thun | Letzigrund, Zürich |
| 16:30 CET (UTC+1) | Ullmann (yellow card) 8'; Steffen 50' (o.g.); Tsimba (yellow card) 55'; Abels (yellow card) 72' | Report | | Attendance: 4,093; Referee: Luca Cibelli; Assistant referees: Nico Gianforte (VAR) |

| 24 January 2026 21 | Lausanne-Sport | 1–1 | Grasshopper | Stade de la Tuilière, Lausanne |
| 18:00 CET (UTC+1) | Diakité 51' | Report | (yellow card) 17' Stroscio; (yellow card) 62' Hassane; 75' (Zvonarek) Asp Jensen | Attendance: 5,345; Referee: Luca Piccolo; Assistant referees: Alessandro Dudic (VAR) |

| 31 January 2026 22 | Grasshopper | 1–1 | Lugano | Letzigrund, Zürich |
| 20:30 CET (UTC+1) | Diaby (yellow card) 27'; Krasniqi 85' (Meyer); Asp Jensen (yellow card) 90+3' | Report | 62' Steffen; (red card) 89' Mahmoud | Attendance: 3,228; Referee: Nico Gianforte; Assistant referees: Hüseyin Sanli |

| 7 February 2026 23 | Grasshopper | 1–1 | Young Boys | Letzigrund, Zürich |
| 20:30 CET (UTC+1) | Ullmann 79'; Abrashi (yellow card) 90+5' | Report | 31' Sanches; (yellow card) 42' (yellow-red card) 66' Wüthrich | Attendance: 5,284; Referee: Mirel Turkes; Assistant referees: Sven Wolfensberger |

| 10 February 2026 24 | Luzern | 4–3 | Grasshopper | Swissporarena, Luzern |
| 20:30 CET (UTC+1) | Kabwit 15'; Di Giusto 37'; Köhler 53' (o.g.); Ottiger 76' | Report | 9' Meyer; 35' (pen.) Plange; (yellow card) 45+1' Diarrassouba; (yellow card) 48' Diaby; 58' Stroscio; (yellow card) 69' Lee; (yellow card) 90+3' Ngom | Attendance: 9,018; Referee: Sandro Schärer; Assistant referees: Lukas Fähndrich (VAR) |

| 14 February 2026 25 | St. Gallen | 0–0 | Grasshopper | Kybunpark, St. Gallen |
| 18:00 CET (UTC+1) | | Report | (yellow card) 36' Krasniqi; (yellow card) 55' Stroscio; (yellow card) 70' Clemente; (yellow card) 86' Diarrassouba; (yellow card) 88' Tsimba | Attendance: 16,017; Referee: Nico Gianforte; Assistant referees: Anojen Kanagasingam (VAR) |

| 21 February 2026 26 | Grasshopper | 1–2 | Zürich | Letzigrund, Zürich |
| 20:30 CET (UTC+1) | Mikulić (yellow card) 64'; Plange 81'; Abrashi (yellow card) 90+3' | Report | 31' Reverson; 51' Kény | Attendance: 14,372; Referee: Luca Piccolo; Assistant referees: Johannes von Mandach (VAR) |

| 1 March 2026 27 | Grasshopper | 1–0 | Lugano | Letzigrund, Zürich |
| 16:30 CET (UTC+1) | Plange 12' (Frey); Diaby (red card) 19'; Stroscio (yellow card) 89' | Report | | Attendance: 4,543; Referee: Marijan Drmic; Assistant referees: Fedayi San (VAR) |

| 5 March 2026 28 | Basel | 1–0 | Grasshopper | St. Jakob-Park, Basel |
| 20:30 CET (UTC+1) | Traoré 51' | Report | (yellow card) 74' Mikulić; (yellow card) 75' Frey; (yellow card) 90+4' Ngom; (red card) 90+5' Abrashi | Attendance: 23,149; Referee: Luca Cibelli; Assistant referees: Luca Piccolo |

| 8 March 2026 29 | Grasshopper | 2–3 | Lausanne-Sport | Letzigrund, Zürich |
| 16:30 CET (UTC+1) | Abels 8'; Stroscio (yellow card) 33'; Plange 72' (Abels); Frey (yellow card) 89' (yellow-red card) 90+1'; Diaby (yellow card) 90+4' | Report | 22' Mouanga; 50' Custodio; 63' Traoré | Attendance: 5,689; Referee: Hajrim Qovanaj; Assistant referees: Sven Wolfensberger (VAR) |

| 14 March 2026 30 | Thun | 1–5 | Grasshopper | Stockhorn Arena, Thun |
| 18:00 CET (UTC+1) | | Report | 17' (Plange) Lee; (yellow card) 30' Diaby; (yellow card) 39' Abels | Attendance: 10,014; Referee: Désirée Blanco; Assistant referees: Mirel Turkes |

| 21 March 2026 31 | Servette | 5–0 | Grasshopper | Stade de Genève, Lancy |
| 18:00 CET (UTC+1) | | Report | (yellow card) 41' Ngom; (yellow card) 64' Stroscio | Attendance: 6,674; Referee: Marijan Drmic; Assistant referees: Sandro Schärer (VAR) |

| 6 April 2026 32 | Grasshopper | 0–4 | Sion | Letzigrund, Zürich |
| 14:00 CEST (UTC+2) | Hassane (yellow card) 39'; Zvonarek (yellow card) 63' | Report | | Attendance: 7,089; Referee: Fedayi San; Assistant referees: Michèle Schmölzer |

| 11 April 2026 33 | Winterthur | 0–2 | Grasshopper | Stadion Schützenwiese, Winterthur |
| 18:00 CEST (UTC+2) | | Report | 18' (Arigoni) Asp Jensen; (yellow card) 45' Meyer; (yellow card) 65' Stroscio; (yellow card) 69' Arigoni; (yellow card) 73' Abels; (penalty missed) 90+1' 90+11' Frey | Attendance: 8,700; Referee: Urs Schnyder; Assistant referees: Fedayi San (VAR) |

League Split

| 25 April 2026 34 | Grasshopper | 1–2 | Luzern | Letzigrund, Zürich |
| 18:00 CEST (UTC+2) | Hassane 37' | Report | 57', 82' Spadanuda | Attendance: 4,971; Referee: Anojen Kanagasingam; Assistant referees: Lukas Fähndrich (VAR) |

| 3 May 2026 35 | Grasshopper | 0–2 | Servette | Letzigrund, Zürich |
| 16:30 CEST (UTC+2) | Zvonarek (yellow card) 14'; Arigoni (red card) 33'; Köhler (yellow card) 84' | Report | 33' (o.g.) Ullmann; 51' | Attendance: 4,665; Referee: Sven Wolfensberger; Assistant referees: Michèle Schmölzer (VAR) |

| 9 May 2026 36 | Zürich | 2–1 | Grasshopper | Letzigrund, Zürich |
| 18:00 CEST (UTC+2) | | Report | 35' (Asp Jensen) (red card) 45+1' Tsimba; (penalty missed) 66' Asp Jensen; (yellow card) 87' Marques | Attendance: 18,040; Referee: Lukas Fähndrich; Assistant referees: Nico Gianforte (VAR) |

| 12 May 2026 37 | Grasshopper | 3–2 | Winterthur | Letzigrund, Zürich |
| 20:30 CEST (UTC+2) | Abels (yellow card) 28' (goal) 60' (pen.), 70' (Asp Jensen); Meyer (yellow card) 45'; Lee 62' (Krasniqi) (yellow card) 63'; Ngom (yellow card) 83'; Asp Jensen (yellow card) 90+5' | Report | 7', 10' Kasami | Attendance: 8,186; Referee: Sven Wolfensberger; Assistant referees: Sandro Schärer (VAR) |

| 16 May 2026 38 | Lausanne-Sport | 1–3 | Grasshopper | Stade de la Tuilière, Lausanne |
| 18:00 CEST (UTC+2) | Bair (yellow card) 71' (yellow-red card) 75'; Diakité 87' | Report | 14' (Sahin) Papic; 39' (Sahin) Fiechter; (yellow card) 82' Sahin; (yellow card) 84' Gonzalez; 90+1' (Tesfom) (yellow card) 90+3' Kouam | Attendance: 0 (Note: The match was played behind closed doors.); Referee: Alessandro Dudic; Assistant referees: Déborah Anex |

=== Relegation Play-off ===
| 18 May 2026 | Aarau | 0–0 | Grasshopper | Stadion Brügglifeld, Aarau |
| 20:15 CEST (UTC+2) | | Report | (yellow card) 39' Meyer; (yellow card) 54' Zvonarek; (yellow card) 76' Frey | Attendance: 8,450; Referee: Anojen Kanagasingam; Assistant referees: Fedayi San (VAR) |

| 21 May 2026 | Grasshopper | 2–1 (a.e.t.) | Aarau | Letzigrund, Zürich |
| 20:15 CEST (UTC+2) | Zvonarek 30' (Lee) (yellow card) 54'; Marques (yellow card) 78'; Lee (red card) 88'; Ngom 110' (pen.) (yellow card) 118' | Report | 44' Filet; (red card) 105' Obexer | Attendance: 18,763; Referee: Urs Schnyder; Assistant referees: Lukas Fähndrich (VAR) |

Grasshopper wins 2–1 on aggregate.

=== Swiss Cup ===
As of 18 April 2026

Win Draw Loss

Opponent's league indicated in brackets.

| 17 August 2025 Round of 64 | FC Lachen/Altendorf (Canton of Schwyz) (2I) | 0–2 | Grasshopper Club Zürich | Seefeld, Lachen |
| 16:00 CEST (UTC+2) | | Report | 85' (Meyer) Marques; 89' (Asp Jensen) Muci | Attendance: 3,200; Referee: Nico Gianforte |

| 21 September 2025 Round of 32 | AC Bellinzona (Ticino) (ChL) | 0–1 | Grasshopper Club Zürich | Stadio Communale, Bellinzona |
| 17:00 CEST (UTC+2) | | Report | 8' (Asp Jensen) Meyer; (yellow card) 21' Abels; (yellow card) 84' Diaby | Referee: Mirel Turkes |

| 2 December 2025 Round of 16 | SC Cham (Canton of Zug) (PL) | 1–2 | Grasshopper Club Zürich | Stadion Eizmoos, Cham |
| 20:00 CET (UTC+1) | Ris 90+2' (pen.) | Report | 18' (Marques) Ullmann; 21' (Ullmann) Abels; (yellow card) 63' Stroscio | Attendance: 3,427; Referee: Johannes von Mandach |

| 3 February 2026 Quarterfinal | Grasshopper Club Zürich | 4–3 (a.e.t.) | (Valais) FC Sion | Letzigrund, Zürich |
| 20:00 CET (UTC+1) | Frey (yellow card) 42' (goal) 90+3' (Diaby); Asp Jensen 76' (Frey); Tsimba 80', 94' (Meyer); Mikulić (yellow card) 89'; Abels (yellow card) 89'; Glaus (yellow card) 98'; Stroscio (yellow card) 101' | Report | 6' (yellow card) 118' (yellow-red card) 120+1' Hajrizi; 72' Kolloli; 85' Lukembila | Attendance: 3,821; Referee: Alessandro Dudic; Assistant referees: Michèle Schmölzer (VAR) |

| 18 April 2026 Semi-final | FC Stade Lausanne Ouchy (Vaud) | 2–0 | Grasshopper Club Zürich | Stade Olympique de la Pontaise, Lausanne |
| 19:15 CEST | | Report | (red card) 84' Köhler | Attendance: 6,200; Referee: Sandro Schärer; Assistant referees: Michèle Schmölzer (VAR) |
