= 2025–26 Swiss Super League =

129th season of top-tier Swiss football

Swiss Super League
- Season: 2025–26
- Dates: 25 July 2025 – 17 May 2026
- Champions: Thun; 1st title
- Relegated: Winterthur
- Champions League: Thun
- Europa League: St. Gallen
- Conference League: Lugano; Sion
- Matches: 228
- Goals: 691 (3.03 per match)
- Top goalscorer: Christian Fassnacht (18 goals)
- Biggest home win: St. Gallen 5–0 Winterthur (10 August 2025); Young Boys 5–0 Winterthur (22 November 2025)
- Biggest away win: Thun 3–8 Young Boys (14 May 2026)
- Highest scoring: Thun 3–8 Young Boys (14 May 2026)
- Longest winning run: 8 matches Thun
- Longest unbeaten run: 8 matches Thun
- Longest winless run: 11 matches Winterthur
- Longest losing run: 5 matches Winterthur
- Highest attendance: 31,500; Young Boys 0–0 Basel (2 November 2025); Young Boys 1–2 St. Gallen (19 October 2025)
- Lowest attendance: 2,898; Lugano 1–1 Lausanne-Sport (18 September 2025)
- Average attendance: 12,817
- All statistics correct as of 21 May 2026.

The 2025–26 Swiss Super League (referred to as the Brack Super League for sponsoring reasons) was the 129th season of top-tier competitive football in Switzerland, and the 23rd under its current name. It was the third season featuring a new format and increased number of participants, since the beginning of the Super League era in 2003. The defending champions were Basel.

== Overview ==
=== Format and schedule ===
The Swiss Football League (SFL) released a detailed schedule on 26 November 2024:

- The season will begin on 25 July 2025 and conclude on 17 May 2026.
- The league will go on winter break after matchday 19 on 21 December 2025 and resume on 17 January 2026. The final matchday of the relegation group will take place on 16 May, while the championship group will hold its last matches 17 May 2026.
- The two legs of the relegation play-offs are scheduled for 20 and 23 May 2026, respectively.

The season is divided into two phases:

- In a first phase all twelve teams play each other three times each, for a total of 33 matchdays and concludes on 12 April 2026.
- Following that, the league is split into two groups of six each, one championship group and one relegation group. The second phase begins on 25 April 2026.
  - Each team will play every other team in their group one time (five matches each), for a total of 38 matchdays.
  - The championship group will play for the title of Swiss Football Champion and qualification for European championships. Final matchday is on 17 May 2026.
  - The relegation group will play against relegation (last place) and the relegation play-off (second-to-last place). Final matchday will be on 16 May 2026.
- Points won in the first phase are carried over to the second phase.

=== Team changes ===
FC Thun returned to the top tier after a five-year absence. They later won the title. Yverdon-Sport FC were relegated to the Challenge League after two years in the top tier.

== Teams ==
=== Stadia and locations ===
FC Basel	Grasshopper Club Zurich	FC Zürich	FC Lausanne-Sport	FC Lugano
St. Jakob-Park	Letzigrund		Stade de la Tuilière	Stadio Cornaredo
Basel	Zurich		Lausanne	Lugano
Capacity: 37,994	Capacity: 26,103		Capacity: 12,544	Capacity: 6,390
FC Luzern	Location of the 2025–26 Swiss Super League teams			Servette FC
Swissporarena	Location of the 2025–26 Swiss Super League teams			Stade de Genève
Luzern	Location of the 2025–26 Swiss Super League teams			Geneva
Capacity: 16,490	Location of the 2025–26 Swiss Super League teams			Capacity: 28,833
FC Sion	FC St. Gallen	FC Thun	FC Winterthur	BSC Young Boys
Stade de Tourbillon	Kybunpark	Stockhorn Arena	Stadion Schützenwiese	Stadion Wankdorf
Sion	St. Gallen	Thun	Winterthur	Bern
Capacity: 14,283	Capacity: 19,455	Capacity: 10,000	Capacity: 8,400	Capacity: 31,120

=== Managerial changes ===
Team	Outgoing manager	Manner of departure	Date of departure	Position in table	Incoming manager	Date of appointment	Ref.
Zürich	(Royal Dutch Football Association) Ricardo Moniz	Termination	Pre-season		(Royal Dutch Football Association) Mitchell van der Gaag	31 May 2025	
Basel	(Swiss Football Association) Fabio Celestini	Resignation	Pre-season		(Swiss Football Association) Ludovic Magnin	16 June 2025	
Lausanne	(Swiss Football Association) Ludovic Magnin	Mutual consent	Pre-season		(German Football Association) Peter Zeidler	21 June 2025	
Grasshopper	(German Football Association) Tomas Oral	Mutual consent	Pre-season		(Austrian Football Association) Gerald Scheiblehner	24 June 2025	
Servette	(Swiss Football Association) Thomas Häberli	Termination	4 August 2025	11th	(French Football Federation) Jocelyn Gourvennec	11 August 2025	
Winterthur	(Switzerland) Uli Forte	Termination	20 October 2025	12th	(Switzerland) Patrick Rahmen	22 October 2025	
Zürich	(Netherlands) Mitchell van der Gaag	Termination	23 October 2025	8th	(Switzerland) Dennis Hediger (interim)	23 October 2025	
Young Boys	(Switzerland) Giorgio Contini	Termination	31 October 2025	5th	(Switzerland) Gerardo Seoane	31 October 2025	
Basel	(Swiss Football Association) Ludovic Magnin	Termination	26 January 2026	4th	(Switzerland) Stephan Lichtsteiner	26 January 2026	
Grasshopper	(Austrian Football Association) Gerald Scheiblehner	Termination	16 March 2026	11th	(Austrian Football Association) Gernot Messner (interim)	16 March 2026	
Zürich	(Switzerland) Dennis Hediger	Termination	14 April 2026	10th	(Argentina) Carlos Bernegger (interim)	14 April 2026	
Lausanne	(German Football Association) Peter Zeidler	Termination	16 April 2026	9th	(German Football Association) Markus Neumayr & (Albanian Football Federation) Migjen Basha (interim)	16 April 2026	
Grasshopper	(Austrian Football Association) Gernot Messner (interim)	End of interim period	4 May 2026	11th	(German Football Association) Peter Zeidler	1 May 2026	

== League table ==
Pos	Team	Pld	W	D	L	GF	GA	GD	Pts	Qualification or relegation (Note: Teams play each other three times (33 matches), before the league is split into two groups (the top six and the bottom six).)
1	Thun (C)	38	24	3	11	80	52	+28	75	Qualification for the Champions League second qualifying round
2	St. Gallen	38	20	10	8	72	47	+25	70	Qualification for the Europa League second qualifying round (Note: St. Gallen won the 2025–26 Swiss Cup and qualified for the Europa League second qualifying round as cup winners. Since they finished in the top three, the second Conference League berth was passed to the fourth-placed team, Sion.)
3	Lugano	38	19	10	9	59	42	+17	67	Qualification for the Conference League second qualifying round
4	Sion	38	16	15	7	63	40	+23	63	Qualification for the Conference League second qualifying round
5	Basel	38	16	8	14	55	58	−3	56	
6	Young Boys	38	15	10	13	80	69	+11	55	
7	Luzern	38	14	11	13	76	66	+10	53	
8	Servette	38	13	14	11	71	63	+8	53	
9	Lausanne-Sport	38	11	9	18	53	67	−14	42	
10	Zürich	38	11	5	22	49	72	−23	38	
11	Grasshopper (O)	38	8	9	21	48	74	−26	33	Qualification for the Relegation play-off
12	Winterthur (R)	38	5	8	25	44	100	−56	23	Relegation to 2026–27 Swiss Challenge League

Source: Brack Super League - Tabelle
Rules for classification: 1) Points; 2) Goal difference; 3) Goals scored; 4) Head-to-head goal difference; 5) Head-to-head goals scored 6) Away goals scored; 7) Draw.
(C) Champions; (O) Play-off winners; (R) Relegated

== Results ==
=== First and second rounds ===
Home \ Away	BAS	GCZ	LS	LUG	LUZ	SER	SIO	STG	THU	WIN	YB	ZÜR
Basel		2–1	0–0	0–1	1–2	1–1	1–1	0–0	1–2	3–0	4–1	2–0
Grasshopper	1–1		3–1	1–1	2–3	0–1	0–1	1–2	1–3	2–2	3–3	3–0
Lausanne-Sport	5–1	1–1		0–0	0–4	1–3	2–2	1–2	2–1	3–2	5–0	1–2
Lugano	3–1	2–1	1–1		2–0	4–2	1–1	1–3	1–2	4–1	3–0	1–0
Luzern	1–2	6–0	2–2	2–5		2–2	3–3	2–2	1–2	1–3	1–2	1–1
Servette	0–3	1–1	0–1	2–1	2–2		3–3	1–4	0–1	4–0	4–4	1–1
Sion	0–1	1–0	0–0	4–0	1–1	0–2		3–2	0–1	2–0	2–0	2–2
St. Gallen	2–1	5–0	1–0	1–0	0–1	2–4	3–1		1–2	5–0	1–4	1–2
Thun	1–3	1–1	2–1	0–1	4–1	3–1	2–1	0–2		3–0	4–1	4–2
Winterthur	1–2	0–1	2–1	2–4	2–2	4–2	2–3	1–5	1–4		1–1	1–3
Young Boys	0–0	2–6	1–3	3–1	2–0	3–1	0–0	1–2	4–2	5–0		3–0
Zürich	3–4	1–0	1–2	0–1	3–2	2–1	2–3	3–1	0–4	2–2	2–3	

Source: Swiss Football League
Legend: Blue = home team win; Yellow = draw; Red = away team win.
For upcoming matches, an "a" indicates there is an article about the rivalry between the two participants.

=== Third round ===
Home \ Away	BAS	GCZ	LS	LUG	LUZ	SER	SIO	STG	THU	WIN	YB	ZÜR
Basel		1–0		1–1		3–1					3–3	2–1
Grasshopper			2–3	1–0			0–4				1–1	1–2
Lausanne-Sport	1–2					3–3		1–1		2–1	0–2	
Lugano			2–1		1–3	1–1	2–1		1–0			
Luzern	4–2	4–3	4–0					2–2		1–2	1–2	
Servette		5–0			3–0		0–0	1–1	1–3			2–1
Sion	2–0		3–0		0–0			1–1		1–1	3–1	
St. Gallen	3–0	0–0		1–1						2–1	2–1	2–1
Thun	3–1	5–1	5–1		2–1		1–0	2–2				
Winterthur	0–2	0–2		1–1		1–1			0–3			
Young Boys				1–1		1–1			1–2	6–1		3–0
Zürich			1–2	0–1	1–4		1–2		2–1	3–0		

Source: Swiss Football League
Legend: Blue = home team win; Yellow = draw; Red = away team win.
For upcoming matches, an "a" indicates there is an article about the rivalry between the two participants.

=== Split ===
After 33 matches, the league splits into two groups of six teams. The top six are grouped into the championship group and the bottom six into the relegation group, with the teams playing every other team in their group once (either at home or away).

==== Championship Group ====
Home \ Away	BAS	LUG	SIO	STG	THU	YB
Basel			0–2	1–3	3–1	
Lugano	4–0			1–2		1–0
Sion		2–2			2–0	
St. Gallen			0–3		1–1	
Thun		0–1				3–8
Young Boys	3–0		3–3	1–2		

Source: Swiss Football League
Legend: Blue = home team win; Yellow = draw; Red = away team win.

==== Relegation Group ====
Home \ Away	GCZ	LS	LUZ	SER	WIN	ZÜR
Grasshopper			1–2	0–2	3–2	
Lausanne-Sport	1–3		1–3			3–0
Luzern				3–3		1–0
Servette		2–0			5–3	
Winterthur		2–1	0–3			2–2
Zürich	2–1			0–2		

Source: Swiss Football League
Legend: Blue = home team win; Yellow = draw; Red = away team win.
For upcoming matches, an "a" indicates there is an article about the rivalry between the two participants.

== Relegation play-off ==
The relegation play-off between the eleventh placed team of the Swiss Super League and the runner up of the 2025–26 Swiss Challenge League will be held following the conclusion of the regular season. The play-off is held over two legs, played home and away, and was originally scheduled on the 20 and 23 May 2026. A draw held on 13 March 2026 decided that the Challenge League side will host the first leg and the Super League side will host the second leg.

Grasshopper's place in the play-off was confirmed on 12 May 2026, following a 3–2 home win against Winterthur. It will be their third consecutive participation in the relegation play-off. Aarau failed to secure direct promotion on the last matchday of the Challenge League on 15 May 2026, but will receive a second chance in the play-off. It will be a reprise of last year's play-off. The relegation play-off was pushed forward by two days, as eleventh placed Grasshopper's home ground Letzigrund would not be available on the date of the second leg. The new dates will be 18 and 21 May 2026.

=== First leg ===
18 May 2026
20:15 CEST (UTC+2)

Aarau	0–0	Grasshopper
	Report

Stadion Brügglifeld, Aarau
Attendance: 8,450
Referee: Anojen Kanagasingam

=== Second leg ===
21 May 2026
20:15 CEST (UTC+2)

Grasshopper	2–1 (a.e.t.)	Aarau
Zvonarek 30'; Lee (red card) 88'; Ngom 110' (pen.)	Report	Filet 44'; (red card) 105' Obexer

Letzigrund, Zürich
Attendance: 18,763
Referee: Urs Schnyder

Grasshopper wins 2–1 on aggregate.

== Season statistics ==
=== Top scorers ===
As of 14 May 2026

Rank	Player	Club	Goals
1	(Swiss Football Association) Christian Fassnacht	Young Boys	18
2	(Ivorian Football Federation) Chris Bedia	Young Boys	17
3	(Swiss Football Association) Alessandro Vogt	St. Gallen	15
3	(Football Federation of Macedonia) Elmin Rastoder	Thun	15
5	(Football Association of Bosnia and Herzegovina) Miroslav Stevanović	Servette	14
6	(Senegalese Football Federation) Philippe Kény	Zürich	13
6	(Football Federation of Kosovo) Rilind Nivokazi	Sion	13
8	(Swiss Football Association) Matteo Di Giusto	Luzern	12
8	(German Football Association) Carlo Boukhalfa	St. Gallen	12
10	(Swiss Football Association) Xherdan Shaqiri	Basel	11
10	(French Football Federation) Florian Ayé	Servette	11
10	(Guinean Football Federation) Aliou Baldé	St. Gallen	11
10	(German Football Association) Kevin Behrens	Lugano	11
10	(Swiss Football Association) Leonardo Bertone	Thun	11
10	(Swiss Football Association) Andrin Hunziker	Winterthur	11

=== Hat tricks ===
Player	Team	Opponent	Result	Date
(The Football Association) Luke Plange	Grasshopper	Young Boys	6–2 (A)	17 December 2025

== Awards ==
=== Swiss Golden Player Awards 2025–26 ===
Individual awards
Super League Player of the Season	(Germany) Lukas Görtler	St. Gallen
Super League Coach of the Season	(Germany) Enrico Maaßen	St. Gallen
Golden Player	(Switzerland) Valon Fazliu	Aarau

Team of the Year
Goalkeeper	(Switzerland) Anthony Racioppi (Sion)			
Defenders	(Austria) Flavius Daniliuc (Basel)		(Germany) Antonios Papadopoulos (Lugano)	(Bosnia and Herzegovina) Jozo Stanić (St. Gallen)
Midfielders	(Switzerland) Leonardo Bertone (Thun)	(Switzerland) Matteo Di Giusto (Luzern)	(Switzerland) Anto Grgić (Lugano)	(Switzerland) Alvyn Sanches (Young Boys)
Forwards	(Ivory Coast) Chris Bedia (Young Boys)		(North Macedonia) Elmin Rastoder (Thun)	(Switzerland) Alessandro Vogt (St. Gallen )

== Attendances ==
Swiss Super League clubs listed by average home league attendance:

Pos	Club	Average attendance
1	BSC Young Boys	27,531
2	FC Basel	26,508
3	FC St. Gallen	17,718
4	FC Zürich	13,527
5	FC Luzern	11,650
6	FC Sion	9,718
7	FC Thun	9,009
8	FC Winterthur	7,958
9	Servette FC	7,773
10	GCZ	6,811
11	Lausanne-Sport	6,187
12	FC Lugano	3,583
