= Jonathan Asp Jensen =

Danish footballer (born 2005)

Personal information
- Date of birth: 14 January 2006 (age 20)
- Place of birth: Gauerslund, Denmark
- Height: 1.82 m (6 ft 0 in)
- Positions: Left winger; attacking midfielder

Team information
- Current team: Deportivo A Coruña
- Number: 18

Youth career
- –2013: Gauerslund IF
- 2013–2017: Vejle
- 2017: Gauerslund IF
- 2017–2022: Midtjylland
- 2022–2025: Bayern Munich

Senior career*
Years	Team	Apps	(Gls)
2024–2025	Bayern Munich II	36	(7)
2024–2026	Bayern Munich	1	(0)
2025–2026	→ Grasshopper (loan)	33	(8)
2026–	Deportivo A Coruña	8	(0)

International career^{‡}
2021–2022	Denmark U16	8	(5)
2022–2023	Denmark U17	8	(2)
2023–2024	Denmark U18	3	(0)
Medal record
Men's football
Representing Denmark
UEFA European Under-17 Championship
Bronze medal – third place	2024 Cyprus
- * Club domestic league appearances and goals as of 23:45, 24 October 2026 (UTC) ‡ National team caps and goals as of 2 April 2024

Jonathan Asp Jensen (born 14 January 2006) is a Danish professional footballer who plays as a left winger or attacking midfielder for La Liga club Deportivo A Coruña.

== Early life ==
Jensen is a native of Gauerslund, Denmark. He has been regarded as one of the most prominent football prospects in the country.

== Club career ==
=== Bayern Munich ===
Jensen joined the youth academy of German side Bayern Munich from the youth academy of Danish Superliga side Midtjylland on 2022.

He started his professional career with the Bayern Munich II side. On 24 February 2024, Jensen made his professional debut during a 1–0 win Regionalliga Bayern match over Viktoria Aschaffenburg. A month later, on 8 March, he scored his first goal for Bayern Munich II on a 2–0 home win Regionalliga Bayern match against DJK Vilzing. A week later on 16 March, Jensen started and scored his second goal for the club during a 4–0 Regionalliga Bayern away win match against FC Memmingen.

On 12 May 2024, he made his Bundesliga debut for the senior team of Bayern Munich, coming off the bench to substitute Lovro Zvonarek, in a 2–0 win over VfL Wolfsburg.

Jensen was called up with the Bayern Munich senior team for a friendly match on 6 January 2025, after the 2024 winter break concluded, in which he substituted Joshua Kimmich at the 63rd minute of a 6–0 win over Austrian Bundesliga club Red Bull Salzburg, scoring the sixth and last goal at the 77th minute.

==== Loan to Grasshopper ====
On 26 June 2025, Swiss Super League club Grasshopper Club Zurich announced his signing, joining on a one-year loan for the 2025–26 season. He scored his first goal for Grasshoppers on 24 August 2025, with the opening goal during a 2–2 draw at home against FC Winterthur.

=== Deportivo A Coruña ===
On 13 July 2026, he transferred to Spanish club Deportivo A Coruña, signing a contract until 2031.

== International career ==
Jensen is a Denmark youth international, having represented the U16s, U17s and U18s.

== Style of play ==
Jensen mainly operates as an attacking midfielder. He is two-footed and is known for his playmaking ability and for his ability to read the game.

== Career statistics ==
As of 21 May 2026

Appearances and goals by club, season and competition
Club	Season	League			Cup (Note: Includes Swiss Cup)		Continental		Other		Total	
Club	Season	Division	Apps	Goals	Apps	Goals	Apps	Goals	Apps	Goals	Apps	Goals
Bayern Munich II	2023–24	Regionalliga Bayern	13	2	–		–		–		13	2
Bayern Munich II	2024–25	Regionalliga Bayern	23	5	–		–		–		23	5
Bayern Munich II	Total		36	7	0	0	0	0	0	0	36	7
Bayern Munich	2023–24	Bundesliga	1	0	0	0	0	0	–		1	0
Bayern Munich	2024–25	Bundesliga	–		–		0	0	–		0	0
Bayern Munich	Total		1	0	0	0	0	0	0	0	1	0
Grasshopper (loan)	2025–26	Swiss Super League	33	8	5	1	–		2 (Note: Appearances in relegation play-offs)	0	40	9
Career total			70	15	5	1	0	0	2	0	77	16

== Honours ==
Denmark U17

- UEFA European Under-17 Championship third place: 2024

Bayern Munich

- Bundesliga: 2024–25
