= Sven Köhler =

Sven Köhler may refer to:

- Sven Köhler (footballer, born 1966)
- Sven Köhler (footballer, born 1996)
