= Saulo Decarli =

Swiss footballer (born 1992)

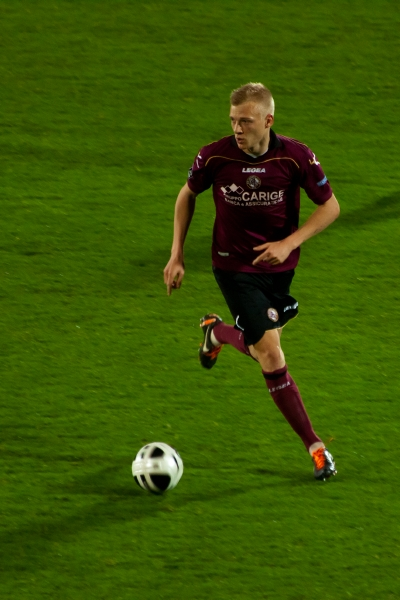

Personal information
- Full name: Saulo Igor Decarli
- Date of birth: 4 February 1992 (age 34)
- Place of birth: Locarno, Switzerland
- Height: 1.86 m (6 ft 1 in)
- Position: Centre back

Youth career
- Team Ticino

Senior career*
Years	Team	Apps	(Gls)
2010–2012	Locarno	59	(4)
2012–2013	Chiasso	10	(1)
2013–2014	Livorno	16	(0)
2014	→ Avellino (loan)	10	(0)
2014–2017	Eintracht Braunschweig	84	(3)
2014–2017	→ Eintracht Braunschweig II	3	(0)
2017–2019	Club Brugge	20	(1)
2019–2022	VfL Bochum	28	(1)
2022–2024	Eintracht Braunschweig	30	(1)
2024–2026	Grasshopper	28	(1)
Total		269	(11)

International career
2010	Switzerland U19	8	(0)
2011	Switzerland U20	6	(0)
2013–2014	Switzerland U21	9	(0)
- * Club domestic league appearances and goals as of 1 September 2026

Saulo Decarli (born 4 February 1992) is a retired Swiss footballer who played as a central defender, most recently for Swiss Super League club Grasshopper.

== Career ==
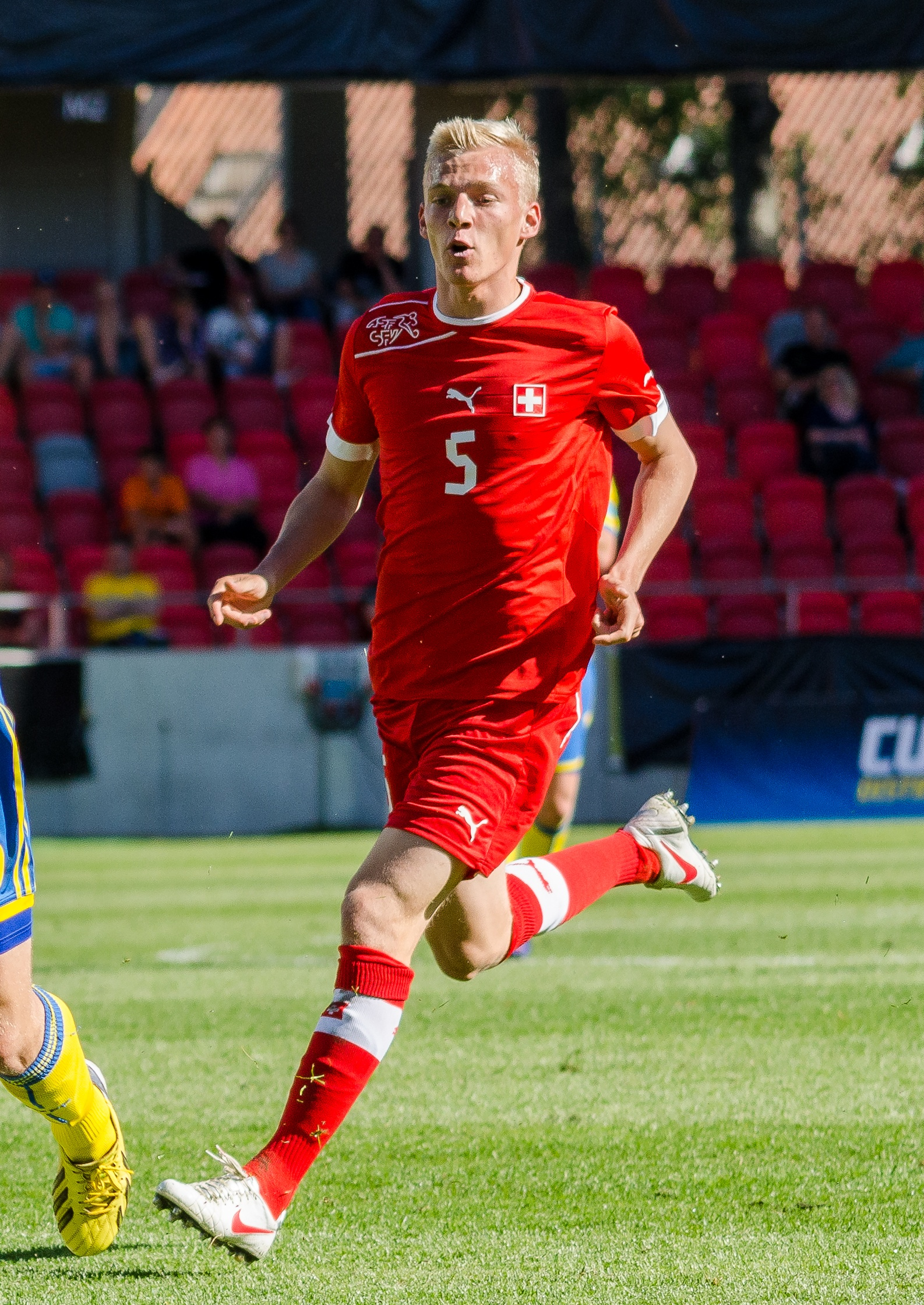
Decarli in action with Switzerland U21.

In 2013, Decarli was signed by Italian Serie B club Livorno. For the second half of the 2013–14 season he played for Serie B club Avellino, on loan from Livorno.

On 29 June 2014, Eintracht Braunschweig announced that Decarli had signed a five-year contract with the club. At the end of July 2017, he was temporarily demoted to the club's reserves for "team-damaging behaviour". Subsequently, he was not called up to the first-team squad by manager Torsten Lieberknecht while making one appearance for the reserves.

On 21 August 2017, he transferred to Club Brugge on a three-year deal. The transfer fee paid to Braunschweig was not disclosed.

On 11 June 2019, VfL Bochum announced Decarli as their new signing, for an undisclosed fee. He will take the number 5 jersey.

On 3 June 2022, Eintracht Braunschweig announced the return of Decarli on a free transfer.

On 12 June 2024, he returned to Switzerland, joining Swiss Super League side Grasshopper on a free transfer. On 17 June 2025, his contract was extended for a further two years until summer 2027. On 10 August 2025, he scored his first goal in a Grasshopper jersey with the opening goal of a 1–1 draw away against Servette. On 31 August 2026, he departed Grasshopper and ended his active playing career.

== Career statistics ==
=== Club ===
As of 1 September 2026

Appearances and goals by club, season and competition
Club	Season	League			National Cup		Europe		Other		Total	
Club	Season	Division	Apps	Goals	Apps	Goals	Apps	Goals	Apps	Goals	Apps	Goals
Locarno	2010–11	Swiss Challenge League	23	2	0	0	–		–		23	2
Locarno	2011–12	Swiss Challenge League	30	1	0	0	–		–		30	1
Locarno	Total		53	3	0	0	0	0	0	0	53	3
Chiasso	2012–13	Swiss Challenge League	10	1	0	0	–		–		10	1
Livorno	2012–13	Serie B	16	0	0	0	–		–		16	0
Avellino (loan)	2013–14	Serie B	10	0	0	0	–		–		10	0
Braunschweig	2014–15	2. Bundesliga	17	0	1	0	–		–		18	0
Braunschweig	2015–16	2. Bundesliga	29	1	3	0	–		–		32	1
Braunschweig	2016–17	2. Bundesliga	28	2	0	0	–		2 (Note: Appearances in the 2. Bundesliga promotion play-offs)	0	30	2
Braunschweig	Total		74	3	4	0	0	0	2	0	80	3
Club Brugge	2017–18	Belgian First Division A	11	1	2	0	0	0	1	0	14	1
Club Brugge	2018–19	Belgian First Division A	9	0	2 (Note: Appearances in the Belgian Super Cup and the Belgian Cup)	0	1	0	0	0	12	0
Club Brugge	Total		20	1	4	0	1	0	1	0	26	1
Bochum	2019–20	2. Bundesliga	22	1	1	0	–		–		23	1
Bochum	2020–21	2. Bundesliga	5	0	1	0	–		–		6	0
Bochum	2021–22	Bundesliga	1	0	0	0	–		–		1	0
Bochum	Total		28	1	2	0	0	0	0	0	30	1
Braunschweig	2022–23	2. Bundesliga	14	1	1	0	–		–		15	1
Braunschweig	2023–24	2. Bundesliga	16	0	0	0	–		–		16	0
Braunschweig	Total		30	1	1	0	0	0	0	0	31	1
Grasshopper	2024–25	Swiss Super League	17	0	2	0	—		2 (Note: Appearances in the relegation playoff)	0	21	0
Grasshopper	2025–26	Swiss Super League	11	1	3	0	—		—		14	1
Grasshopper	2026–27	Swiss Super League	0	0	0	0	—		—		0	0
Grasshopper	Total		28	1	5	0	0	0	2	0	35	1
Career total			269	11	16	0	1	0	5	0	294	11

== Honours ==
Clubs

Club Brugge K.V

- Belgian Pro League: 2017–18
- Belgian Super Cup: 2018

Bochum

- 2.Bundesliga: 2020-21
