= Pantaleo Creti =

Ugandan footballer (born 2008)

Personal information
- Date of birth: 22 July 2008 (age 18)
- Place of birth: Italy
- Height: 1.85 m (6 ft 1 in)
- Position: Defender

Team information
- Current team: Grasshopper
- Number: 22

Youth career
- –2025: Monza

Senior career*
Years	Team	Apps	(Gls)
2025–	Grasshopper	4	(1)
2026–	Grasshopper II	4	(0)

International career^{‡}
2024	Italy U16	1	(0)
2024	Italy U17	2	(0)
- * Club domestic league appearances and goals as of 28 September 2026 ‡ National team caps and goals as of 9 September 2024

Pantaleo Creti (born 22 July 2008) is a professional footballer who plays as a defender for Swiss Super League club Grasshopper. Born in Italy, he has represented Italy and has been called up to represent Uganda internationally at youth level.

== Early life ==
Creti was born on 22 July 2008 in Italy. Born to an Ugandan mother and an Italian father, he moved with his family to Lecce, Italy at the age of four.

== Club career ==
As a youth player, Creti joined the youth academy of Italian side Monza. Following his stint there, he signed with Swiss Super League side Grasshopper ahead of the 2025–26 season. On 30 August 2025, in just his second appearance for Grasshopper, he scored just a minute after being subbed on against Thun in the 83rd minute of the game.

== International career ==
Creti is an Italy youth international and has been called up to represent Uganda internationally at youth level. During the autumn of 2025, he was called up to the provisional squad of the Uganda national under-17 football team for the 2025 FIFA U-17 World Cup.

== Style of play ==
Creti plays as a defender. Italian magazine Sprint e Sport wrote in 2025 that he is "not just a bulwark in defense, but a true engine in attack. Creti has shown himself to have a trained foot, capable of churning out assists".
