= Luka Mikulić =

Bosnian footballer (born 2005)

Personal information
- Date of birth: 7 May 2005 (age 21)
- Place of birth: Split, Croatia
- Height: 1.92 m (6 ft 4 in)
- Position: Centre-back

Team information
- Current team: Grasshopper
- Number: 4

Youth career
- Posušje

Senior career*
Years	Team	Apps	(Gls)
2024–2026	Posušje	19	(0)
2024–2025	→ HNK Grude (loan)		
2026–	Grasshopper	21	(0)

International career
2025	Bosnia and Herzegovina U21	1	(0)
- * Club domestic league appearances and goals as of 28 September 2026

Luka Mikulić (pronounced [lûːka mǐkulitɕ]; born 7 May 2005) is a Bosnian professional footballer who plays as a centre-back for Swiss Super League club Grasshopper. Born in Croatia, he plays for the Bosnia and Herzegovina national U21 team.

Mikulić started his professional career at Posušje, who loaned him to HNK Grude in 2024. In 2026, he signed with Grasshopper.

== Club career ==
=== Early career ===
Mikulić came through Posušje's youth setup. In September 2024, he was sent on a season-long loan to HNK Grude. He made his professional debut against Široki Brijeg on 26 July 2025 at the age of 20.

=== Grasshoppers ===
In January 2026, Mikulić moved to Swiss team Grasshopper on a contract until June 2030. He made his official debut for the squad on 24 January against Lausanne-Sport.

== International career ==
Mikulić is a member of the Bosnia and Herzegovina under-21 team.

== Career statistics ==
=== Club ===
As of match played 14 March 2026

Appearances and goals by club, season and competition
Club	Season	League			National cup (Note: Includes Bosnian Cup, Swiss Cup)		Continental		Total	
Club	Season	Division	Apps	Goals	Apps	Goals	Apps	Goals	Apps	Goals
Posušje	2025–26	Bosnian Premier League	19	0	1	0	–		20	0
Grasshoppers	2025–26	Swiss Super League	9	0	1	0	–		10	0
Career total			28	0	2	0	–		30	0
