= El Bachir Ngom =

Ugandan footballer (born 2000)

Personal information
- Full name: Mouhamed El Bachir Ngom
- Date of birth: 12 May 2000 (age 26)
- Place of birth: Dakar, Senegal
- Height: 1.83 m (6 ft 0 in)
- Position: Full-back

Team information
- Current team: Gent

Youth career
- –2019: Diambars

Senior career*
Years	Team	Apps	(Gls)
2019–2022	Diambars		
2022	Auda	14	(1)
2022–2026	Riga	94	(2)
2026	Grasshopper	15	(0)
2026–	Gent	7	(0)

International career
	Senegal U23	0	(0)
- * Club domestic league appearances and goals as of 18 September 2026

Mouhamed El Bachir Ngom (born 12 May 2000) is a Senegalese professional footballer who plays as a defender for Belgian Pro League club Gent.

== Career ==
A youth product of Diambars FC, he departed Senegal to join Virslīga side FK Auda in early 2022. After less than half a year and just 14 matches playing in the Latvian top flight, he departed Auda to join league rivals Riga FC. During his time in Riga, he won the 2025 Virslīga and the 2023 Latvian Football Cup. Additionally, he was chosen as the Latvian Highest league best player in 2025.

On 5 February he joined Swiss Super League side Grasshopper Club Zurich on a deal until summer 2029. The Swiss record champions paid a reported €600,000 fee for Ngom. On 21 May, he scored the winning goal via penalty in the extra-time of the second leg of the relegation play-off, via penalty, thus playing a vital role in his side avoiding relegation.

on 13 July 2026, after just five months in Zurich, he transferred to Belgian side Gent. He signed a five-year deal with The Buffaloes, until 2031.

== Career Statistics ==
As of 18 September 2026

Appearances and goals by club, season and competition
Club	Season	League			National cup		Europe		Other		Total	
Club	Season	Division	Apps	Goals	Apps	Goals	Apps	Goals	Apps	Goals	Apps	Goals
Auda	2022	Latvian Higher League	14	1	—		—		—		14	1
Riga	2022	Latvian Higher League	16	0	1	0	4 (Note: Appearances in the UEFA Conference League qualification)	0	—		21	0
Riga	2023	Latvian Higher League	25	0	3	1	3	1	—		31	2
Riga	2024	Latvian Higher League	22	1	2	0	2	0	—		26	1
Riga	2025	Latvian Higher League	31	1	4	1	6	0	—		41	2
Riga	Total		94	2	10	2	15	1	0	0	119	5
Grasshopper	2025–26	Swiss Super League	15	0	0	0	—		2 (Note: Two appearances in the relegation play-off)	1	17	1
Gent	2026–27	Belgian Pro League	7	0	0	0	6	0	—		13	0
Career Total			130	3	10	2	21	1	2	1	163	7

== Honors ==
Riga

- 2025 Latvian Higher League
- 2023 Latvian Football Cup

Individual

- 2025 Latvian Highest league best player
