= Maximilian Ullmann =

Austrian footballer

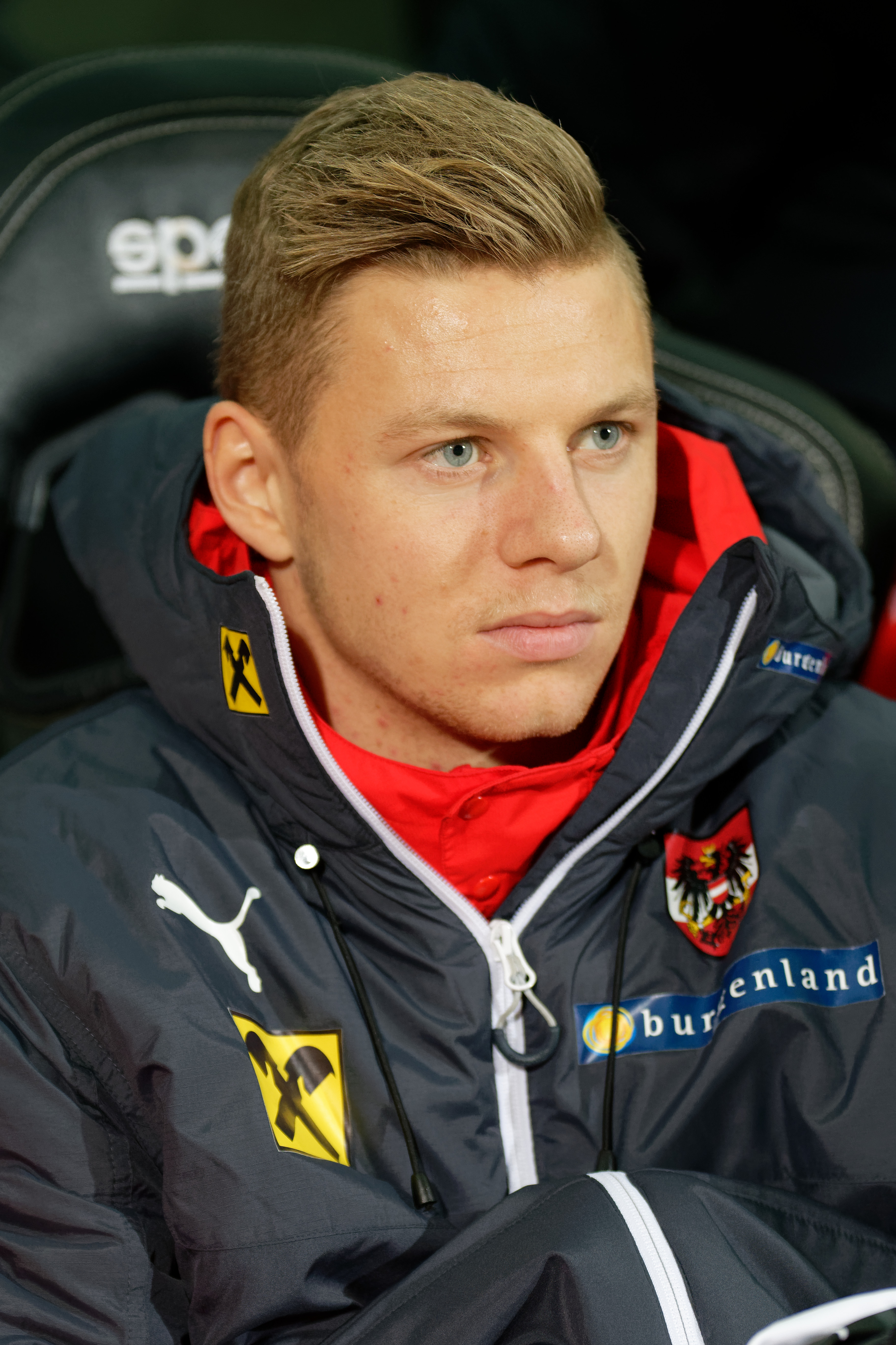
- Ullmann in 2017 with the Austria U21

Personal information
- Date of birth: 17 June 1996 (age 30)
- Place of birth: Linz, Austria
- Height: 1.80 m (5 ft 11 in)
- Position: Left-back

Team information
- Current team: Grasshopper Club Zürich
- Number: 31

Youth career
- 2001–2010: FC Pasching
- 2010–2014: Fußballakademie Linz

Senior career*
Years	Team	Apps	(Gls)
2014–2018	Juniors OÖ	28	(0)
2014–2019	LASK Linz	107	(10)
2019–2022	Rapid Wien	77	(4)
2022–2024	Venezia	14	(0)
2023	→ 1. FC Magdeburg (loan)	11	(0)
2024–2025	Wolfsberger AC	30	(3)
2025–	Grasshopper	18	(2)

International career^{‡}
2014	Austria U18	1	(0)
2014–2015	Austria U19	2	(0)
2017–2019	Austria U21	17	(2)
2022–	Austria	1	(0)
- * Club domestic league appearances and goals as of 17 May 2026 ‡ National team caps and goals as of 5 May 2022

Maximilian Ullmann (born 17 June 1996) is an Austrian professional footballer who plays as a left-back for Grasshopper Club Zürich and the Austria national team.

== Club career ==
On 18 January 2022, Ullmann signed a contract with Italian club Venezia until the end of the 2023–24 season.

In January 2023 he joined 2. Bundesliga club 1. FC Magdeburg on loan.

On 30 July 2024, Ullmann moved to Wolfsberger AC on a one-season contract.

On 12 November 2025, he joined Grasshopper Club Zürich in the Swiss Super League. He signed a contract with the Swiss record champions until summer 2027. Just eleven days later, on 23 November 2025, he was nominated to Grasshopper's starting lineup against FC Basel and scored the opening goal in the 13th minute of the 1–1 draw. On 2 December 2025, he scored the opening goal in the Swiss Cup round of 16 tie against SC Cham and supplied the assist for Grasshoppers' second goal in the 2–1 victory.

== Career statistics ==
=== Club ===
As of 2 December 2025

Appearances and goals by club, season and competition
Club	Season	League			National cup		Europe		Total	
Club	Season	Division	Apps	Goals	Apps	Goals	Apps	Goals	Apps	Goals
LASK	2014–15	Austrian First League	12	0	0	0	–		12	0
LASK	2015–16	Austrian First League	21	1	4	0	–		25	1
LASK	2016–17	Austrian First League	16	0	4	0	–		20	0
LASK	2017–18	Austrian Bundesliga	26	5	3	0	–		29	5
LASK	2018–19	Austrian Bundesliga	32	4	5	0	4	0	41	4
LASK	Total		107	10	16	0	4	0	127	10
Rapid Wien	2019–20	Austrian Bundesliga	31	3	1	0	–		32	3
Rapid Wien	2020–21	Austrian Bundesliga	32	1	3	1	8 (Note: Six appearances in UEFA Europa League, two appearances in UEFA Champions League)	0	43	2
Rapid Wien	2021–22	Austrian Bundesliga	14	0	3	1	11 (Note: Nine appearances in UEFA Europa League, two appearances in UEFA Champions League)	0	18	1
Rapid Wien	Total		77	4	7	2	19	0	103	6
Venezia	2021–22	Serie A	5	0	–		–		5	0
Venezia	2022–23	Serie B	5	0	0	0	–		5	0
Venezia	2023–24	Serie B	4	0	0	0	–		4	0
Venezia	Total		14	0	0	0	–		14	0
Magdeburg (loan)	2022–23	2. Bundesliga	11	0	–		–		11	0
Wolfsberg	2024–25	Austrian Bundesliga	30	3	5	0	–		35	3
Grasshopper	2025–26	Swiss Super League	2	1	1	1	–		3	2
Career total			241	18	29	3	23	0	293	21

=== International ===
As of match played 29 March 2022

Appearances and goals by national team and year
National team	Year	Apps	Goals
Austria	2022	1	0
Total		1	0
