= Simone Stroscio =

Swiss footballer (born 2003)

Personal information
- Date of birth: 20 August 2003 (age 23)
- Place of birth: Winterthur, Switzerland
- Height: 1.76 m (5 ft 9 1/2 in)
- Positions: Defensive midfielder; full-back

Team information
- Current team: Grasshoppers
- Number: 28

Youth career
- –2011: FC Effretikon
- 2011–2021: Grasshopper

Senior career*
Years	Team	Apps	(Gls)
2019–2021	Grasshopper U18	29	(3)
2020–2025	Grasshopper U21	46	(2)
2021–	Grasshopper	46	(2)
2023–2024	→ Schaffhausen	44	(3)

International career
2022	Switzerland U20	3	(0)
- * Club domestic league appearances and goals as of 28 September 2026

Simone Stroscio (born 20 August 2003) is a Swiss professional footballer who plays as a midfielder for Grasshopper Club Zürich in the Swiss Super League.

== Early life ==
Simone Stroscio was born on 20 August 2003.

== Professional career ==
=== Academy and early career ===
Stroscio has been a part of Grasshopper Club Zürich's youth academy since the under-8 level. In summer 2021, he first joined the first team of Grasshoppers but still mainly featured for the U21s. On 1 March 2022, he extended his contract with Grasshopper until 2025, along with teammate Filipe de Carvalho. He gave his debut in the Swiss Super League in the final game of the 2021–22 season, on 22 May 2022, coming on in the last nine minutes of a 0–3 defeat against BSC Young Boys.

=== Loan to Schaffhausen ===
On 20 January 2023, he was loaned to FC Schaffhausen in the Swiss Challenge League alongside Robin Kalem for the remainder of the season. After a successful initial loan, where he made ten appearances, this loan was extended for a full season on 19 July 2023. He made a total 46 appearances for Schaffhausen and scored three goals as a defensive midfielder.

=== Return to Grasshoppers ===
Stroscio returned to his Grasshoppers for the following season and became a fixed member of the first squad for the 2024–25 season. However, he managed just four short appearances, as the team struggled to find form. On 16 April 2025, he extended his contract for a further two years, with an option for a third.

He gave his starting eleven debut in the Swiss Super League in the first round of the 2025–26 season and has since become a regular starter. On 30 October 2025, he scored his first goal for the Swiss record champions, the opening goal of a 3–3 draw to BSC Young Boys. He scored his second goal on 10 February 2026, in a 4–3 loss away to FC Luzern. Four days later, he led the team as captain in a 0–0 draw away against FC St. Gallen.
