= Lee Young-jun =

Lee Young-jun may refer to:

- Lee Young-jun (ice hockey)
- Lee Young-jun (footballer)
