= Dirk Abels =

Dutch professional football player

Personal information
- Full name: Dirk Abels
- Date of birth: 13 June 1997 (age 29)
- Place of birth: Udenhout, Netherlands
- Height: 1.86 m (6 ft 1 in)
- Positions: Right-back; center-back

Team information
- Current team: Cong An Ho Chi Minh City
- Number: 4

Youth career
- SvSSS
- –2009: Willem II
- 2009–2014: PSV

Senior career*
Years	Team	Apps	(Gls)
2014–2019	Jong PSV	60	(2)
2018–2019	PSV	0	(0)
2019–2023	Sparta Rotterdam	140	(3)
2023–2026	Grasshopper	83	(4)
2026–	Cong An Ho Chi Minh City	0	(0)
- * Club domestic league appearances and goals as of 17 May 2026

Dirk Abels (born 13 June 1997) is a Dutch professional footballer who plays as a right back or center-back for V.League 1 club Cong An Ho Chi Minh City.

== Club career ==
Abels made his professional debut for Jong PSV in the Eerste Divisie on 9 August 2014, the opening matchday of the 2014–15 season, against Achilles '29.

In June 2016, he signed a contract extension with PSV until 2018. He made his first team debut on 30 October 2018, in a 3–2 loss at home to RKC Waalwijk in the KNVB Cup after extra time.

Abels signed with Sparta Rotterdam in January 2019, where he won promotion to the Eredivisie via play-offs in his first six months.

On 17 July 2023, he signed with Grasshopper Club Zürich in the Swiss Super League. He joins them with a two-year contract with a one-year option to extend, which was activated automatically on 18 April 2025, keeping him at the club until summer 2026. He departed Grasshoppers at the end of his contract.

On 1 August 2026, Abels moved to Vietnam, signing for V.League 1 team Cong An Ho Chi Minh City.

== Career statistics ==
As of match played 18 July 2023

Appearances and goals by club, season and competition
Club	Season	League			National cup		Europe		Other		Total	
Club	Season	Division	Apps	Goals	Apps	Goals	Apps	Goals	Apps	Goals	Apps	Goals
Jong PSV	2015–16	Eerste Divisie	2	0	—		—		—		2	0
Jong PSV	2016–17	Eerste Divisie	12	0	—		—		—		12	0
Jong PSV	2017–18	Eerste Divisie	29	0	—		—		—		29	0
Jong PSV	2018–19	Eerste Divisie	14	0	—		—		—		14	0
Jong PSV	Total		57	0	—		—		—		57	0
PSV	2018–19	Eredivisie	0	0	1	0	—		—		1	0
Sparta Rotterdam	2018–19	Eerste Divisie	21	0	—		—		—		21	0
Sparta Rotterdam	2019–20	Eredivisie	25	0	2	0	—		—		27	0
Sparta Rotterdam	2020–21	Eredivisie	31	1	1	0	2 (Note: Appearance in UEFA Europa Conference League playoffs)	0	—		33	1
Sparta Rotterdam	2021–22	Eredivisie	33	0	2	0	—		—		35	0
Sparta Rotterdam	2022–23	Eredivisie	30	1	0	0	—		—		30	1
Sparta Rotterdam	Total		140	2	6	0	2	0	—		148	2
Grasshopper	2023–24	Super League	24	0	2	0	—		2 (Note: Appearances in the Swiss Super League relegation play-off)	0	0	0
Grasshopper	2024–25	Super League	28	1	2	0	—		2	0	0	0
Grasshopper	2025–26	Super League	31	3	3	1	—		1	0	0	0
Grasshopper	Total		83	4	7	1	—		5	0	95	5
Cong An Ho Chi Minh City	2026–27	V.League 1	0	0	0	0	—		0	0	0	0
Career total			280	6	14	0	0	0	6	0	299	7
