= Gernot Messner =

Austrian footballer

Personal information
- Date of birth: 10 September 1980 (age 46)
- Place of birth: Villach, Austria
- Height: 1.81 m (5 ft 11 1/2 in)
- Position: Midfielder

Team information
- Current team: Grasshopper Club Zürich U21 (manager)

Senior career*
Years	Team	Apps	(Gls)
1999–2003	SV Spittal		
2001–2002	SK Rapid Wien	0	(0)
2002–2005	SV Austria Salzburg	19	(0)
2005–2007	FC Kärnten	39	(2)
2007–2013	Wolfsberger AC	142	(11)
2013–2016	Wolsberger II		
2017	SK St. Andrä		

Managerial career
- 2015–2017: SK St. Andrä
- 2017–2018: Wolfsberger U18
- 2019: Wolfsberger U18
- 2021–2024: Grazer AK
- 2025–2026: Grasshopper U21
- 2026: Grasshopper (interim)
- * Club domestic league appearances and goals

Gernot Messner (born 10 October 1980) is an Austrian football manager and a former player. He was born in Villach. He was the manager of Grazer AK between 2021 and 2024.

On 31 October 2025, he became the coach of the under-21 team of Swiss Super League side Grasshopper Club Zürich. On 16 March 2026, he was nominated as interim head coach of the first team, following Gerald Scheiblehner's dismissal. His caretaker spell came to an end on 4 May 2026.
