= Óscar Clemente =

Spanish footballer (born 1999)

Personal information
- Full name: Óscar Clemente Mues
- Date of birth: 26 March 1999 (age 27)
- Place of birth: Adeje, Spain
- Height: 1.76 m (5 ft 9 in)
- Position: Attacking midfielder

Team information
- Current team: Grasshopper Club Zürich
- Number: 10

Youth career
- Atlético Chenet
- 2013–2018: Atlético Madrid

Senior career*
Years	Team	Apps	(Gls)
2018–2020	Atlético Madrid B	58	(13)
2020	Atlético Madrid	1	(0)
2020–2023	Las Palmas	78	(3)
2023–2025	Levante	30	(1)
2025	→ Cartagena (loan)	18	(0)
2025–	Grasshopper	33	(2)
- * Club domestic league appearances and goals as of 28 September 2026

Óscar Clemente Mues (born 26 March 1999) is a Spanish footballer who plays as an attacking midfielder for Grasshopper Club Zürich in the Swiss Super League.

== Club career ==
Born in Adeje, Santa Cruz de Tenerife, Canary Islands, Clemente joined Atlético Madrid's youth setup in September 2013, from Club Atlético Chenet. He made his senior debut with the reserves on 26 August 2018, starting in a 1–1 Segunda División B away draw against AD Unión Adarve.

Clemente scored his first senior goal on 14 October 2018, netting the opener in a 3–0 home defeat of Celta de Vigo B. On 6 October of the following year, he scored a brace in a 5–1 away routing of Pontevedra CF.

Clemente made his first team – and La Liga – debut on 18 January 2020, coming on as a late substitute for Vitolo in a 0–2 loss at SD Eibar. Five days later, he renewed his contract with Atleti until 2022.

On 19 August 2020, Clemente signed a three-year contract with Segunda División side UD Las Palmas. He scored his first professional goal on 22 January 2022, but in a 3–2 away loss to CF Fuenlabrada.

On 27 June 2023, Clemente signed a two-year deal with Levante UD also in the second division. On 15 January 2025, after being rarely used, he moved to fellow league team FC Cartagena on loan. Upon returning, Clemente terminated his contract with the Granotes on 14 August 2025.

On 21 August 2025, he moved to Switzerland, signing with Swiss Super League side Grasshopper Club Zürich. He joins the Swiss record champions on a two-year deal, with an option for a further year.
