= Salifou Diarrassouba =

Ivorian footballer

Personal information
- Date of birth: 20 December 2001 (age 24)
- Place of birth: Tengréla, Ivory Coast
- Height: 1.66 m (5 ft 5 in)
- Position: Winger

Team information
- Current team: FC Rapperswil-Jona (on loan from Grasshopper)
- Number: 10

Youth career
- 2015–2019: ASEC Mimosas

Senior career*
| Years | Team | Apps | (Gls) |
| 2019–2025 | ASEC Mimosas | 18 | (3) |
| 2020–2022 | → St. Gallen (loan) | 14 | (1) |
| 2021–2022 | → St. Gallen II (loan) | 14 | (3) |
| 2025– | Grasshopper | 23 | (0) |
| 2026– | → FC Rapperswil-Jona (loan) | 9 | (2) |

International career^{‡}
| 2019 | Burkina Faso U20 | 3 | (0) |
| 2023– | Ivory Coast | 4 | (0) |
- * Club domestic league appearances and goals as of 30 September 2026 ‡ National team caps and goals as of 27 January 2023

Salifou Diarrassouba (born 20 December 2001) is an Ivorian professional footballer who plays as a winger for Swiss Challenge League club FC Rapperswil-Jona, on loan from Grasshopper.

== Professional career ==
Diarrassouba began his career in the Ivory Coast with ASEC Mimosas. He joined St. Gallen on loan on 24 September 2020, for the 2019–20 season. He made his professional debut with St. Gallen in a 3–2 Swiss Super League loss to Zürich on 30 January 2021. On 21 May 2021, he scored his first goal for the club in a 2–1 away win over Servette.

In the summer of 2025 he returned to Switzerland to link up with Swiss record champions Grasshopper to join their season preparation. He finally signed for the side on 15 July 2025, on a two-year deal with an option for a further year.

== International career ==
Diarrassouba represented the Burkina Faso U20s at the 2019 Africa U-20 Cup of Nations. He played for Ivory Coast as an 'A' international at the 2022 African Nations Championship for domestic-based players.
