= Lovro Zvonarek =

Croatian footballer (born 2005)

Personal information
- Date of birth: 8 May 2005 (age 21)
- Place of birth: Čakovec, Croatia
- Height: 1.80 m (5 ft 11 in)
- Positions: Attacking midfielder; winger

Team information
- Current team: Estrela da Amadora
- Number: 14

Youth career
- 2012–2016: Mladost Komet
- 2016–2017: NK Koprivnica
- 2017–2018: Slaven Belupo
- 2018–2019: NK Koprivnica
- 2019–2021: Slaven Belupo

Senior career*
Years	Team	Apps	(Gls)
2020–2022	Slaven Belupo	22	(4)
2022–2024	Bayern Munich II	39	(12)
2023–2026	Bayern Munich	5	(1)
2024–2025	→ Sturm Graz (loan)	13	(1)
2025–2026	→ Grasshopper (loan)	25	(2)
2026–	Estrela da Amadora	11	(2)

International career^{‡}
2019	Croatia U15	5	(1)
2020	Croatia U16	4	(2)
2021	Croatia U17	3	(0)
2022	Croatia U18	2	(2)
2022–2023	Croatia U19	6	(3)
2023–	Croatia U21	26	(2)
- * Club domestic league appearances and goals as of 23:45, 8 November 2026 (UTC) ‡ National team caps and goals as of 17 November 2026

Lovro Zvonarek (born 8 May 2005) is a Croatian professional footballer who plays as an attacking midfielder and winger for Primeira Liga club Estrela da Amadora.

== Club career ==
=== Slaven Belupo ===
Zvonarek joined the youth academy of Slaven Belupo in 2016, at the age of 11, coming from Mladost Prelog, his local club. He made his professional debut with Slaven in a 2–0 Prva HNL loss to Rijeka on 12 May 2021. He scored the only goal in his second appearance, a 1–0 win over Varaždin on 22 May 2021; at 16 years and 14 days old, he became the youngest ever scorer in the Prva HNL taking the record from Alen Halilović.

=== Bayern Munich ===
On 10 September 2021, Zvonarek signed a long-term contract with German club Bayern Munich for a reported fee of €1,800,000, although he remained with Slaven Belupo until the end of the 2021–22 season, he would join Bayern Munich II afterwards for further development.

He made his debut for the senior team on a friendly match against Austrian club Red Bull Salzburg on 13 January 2023. Zvonarek along with fellow Bayern Munich academy players Johannes Schenk, Tarek Buchmann, Yusuf Kabadayı and Arijon Ibrahimović started the game on the bench, all coming on as substitutes at the second half, ending as a draw 4–4.

On 1 November 2023, Zvonarek received his first call-up for the Bayern Munich senior team as an unused substitute in the second round DFB-Pokal away 2–1 loss match against 1. FC Saarbrücken.

He made his debut with the Bayern Munich senior team on 27 January 2024, coming off the bench for a Bundesliga 3–2 away win match against FC Augsburg. Later that year, on 12 May, he netted his first Bundesliga goal during his inaugural start in a 2–0 victory against VfL Wolfsburg. Three days later, he signed his first professional contract with the club until 2027.

==== Loan to Sturm Graz ====
On 4 July 2024, Zvonarek joined Austrian Bundesliga club Sturm Graz on a season-long loan deal. He celebrated winning the 2024–25 Austrian Football Bundesliga with Sturm Graz.

==== Loan to Grasshopper ====
On 29 July 2025, he joined Swiss Super League club Grasshopper, on loan for the 2025–26 season. On 24 August 2025, Zvonarek scored his first goal for Grasshoppers, the team's second goal in a 2–2 home draw against FC Winterthur.

=== Estrela da Amadora ===
On 16 July 2026, he transferred to Portuguese Primeira Liga club Estrela da Amadora, permanently for an undisclosed fee, ahead of the 2026–27 season.

== International career ==
From 2019 until 2020, Zvonarek has been part of Croatia at youth international level, respectively has been part of the U15 and U16 teams and he with these teams played nine matches and scored two goals.

== Career statistics ==
As of 21 May 2026

Appearances and goals by club, season and competition
Club	Season	League			National cup (Note: Includes Croatian Cup, Austrian Cup, Swiss Cup)		Europe		Other		Total	
Club	Season	Division	Apps	Goals	Apps	Goals	Apps	Goals	Apps	Goals	Apps	Goals
Slaven Belupo	2020–21	Prva HNL	2	1	0	0	—		—		2	1
Slaven Belupo	2021–22	Prva HNL	20	3	0	0	—		—		20	3
Slaven Belupo	Total		22	4	0	0	—		—		22	4
Bayern Munich II	2022–23	Regionalliga Bayern	17	4	—		—		—		17	4
Bayern Munich II	2023–24	Regionalliga Bayern	22	8	—		—		—		22	8
Bayern Munich II	Total		39	12	—		—		—		39	12
Bayern Munich	2023–24	Bundesliga	5	1	0	0	0	0	—		5	1
Sturm Graz (loan)	2024–25	Austrian Bundesliga	13	1	3	1	6 (Note: Appearances in UEFA Champions League)	0	—		22	2
Grasshopper (loan)	2025–26	Swiss Super League	25	2	4	0	—		2 (Note: Appearances in relegation play-offs)	1	31	3
Career total			104	19	7	1	6	0	2	1	119	21
