= Luke Plange =

English footballer

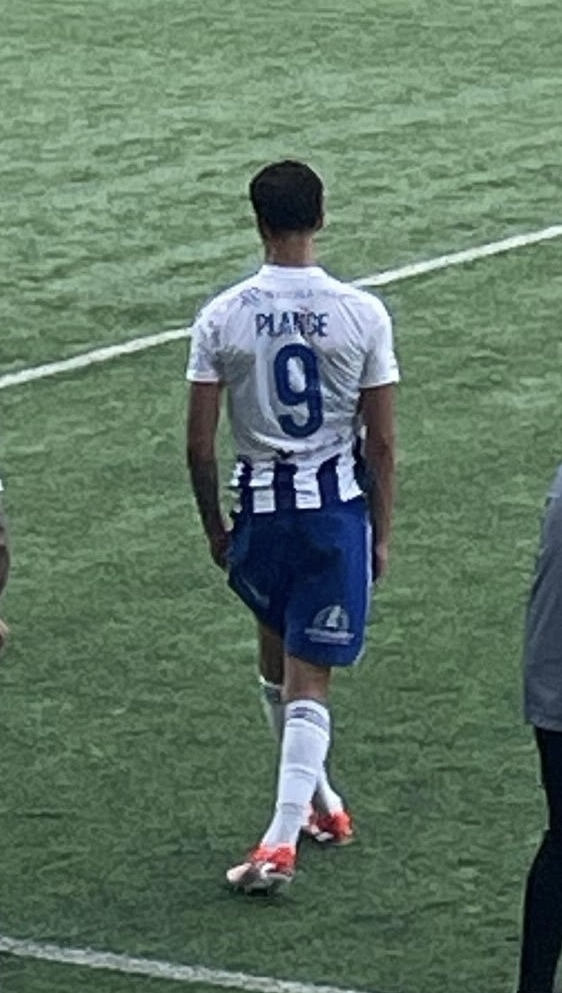
- Plange with HJK in 2024

Personal information
- Full name: Luke Elliot Plange
- Date of birth: 4 November 2002 (age 24)
- Place of birth: Kingston upon Thames, England
- Height: 1.88 m (6 ft 2 in)
- Position: Forward

Team information
- Current team: Grasshopper Club Zurich
- Number: 7

Youth career
- 2008–2021: Arsenal
- 2021: Derby County

Senior career*
| Years | Team | Apps | (Gls) |
| 2021–2022 | Derby County | 8 | (3) |
| 2022–2025 | Crystal Palace | 0 | (0) |
| 2022 | → Derby County (loan) | 18 | (1) |
| 2022–2023 | → RWD Molenbeek (loan) | 14 | (2) |
| 2023 | → Lincoln City (loan) | 18 | (0) |
| 2023–2024 | → Carlisle United (loan) | 22 | (2) |
| 2024 | → HJK (loan) | 26 | (6) |
| 2025 | → Motherwell (loan) | 4 | (0) |
| 2025– | Grasshopper | 32 | (10) |

International career^{‡}
| 2022 | England U20 | 2 | (1) |
- * Club domestic league appearances and goals as of 28 September 2026 ‡ National team caps and goals as of 10:51, 30 March 2022 (UTC)

Luke Elliot Plange (born 4 November 2002) is an English professional footballer who plays as a forward for Swiss Super League side Grasshopper Club Zurich.

== Club career ==
A youth product of Arsenal since the age of six, Plange moved to Derby County on 21 March 2021. He made his professional debut with Derby County on 4 December 2021, coming on as a half-time substitute in a 1–0 EFL Championship defeat against Bristol City.

On 31 January 2022, Plange signed for Crystal Palace and was loaned back to Derby for the remainder of the season. In August 2022 he was loaned to Belgian club RWD Molenbeek, along with teammate Jake O'Brien, for the 2022–23 season. On 30 January 2023, Crystal Palace recalled him from his loan at RWD Molenbeek and sent on loan to Lincoln City for the remainder of the season.

On 1 August 2023, Plange joined Carlisle United on a half-season long loan. He returned to his parent club at the end of the loan deal in January 2024.

On 15 March 2024, Plange joined Finnish Veikkausliiga club HJK Helsinki on loan until 1 January 2025. On 27 April 2024, Plange scored his first goal in the league, in a 1–1 away draw against Haka. On 7 June 2024, Plange scored a hat-trick in a 4–1 home win against SJK, after coming on as the 71st minute substitute to Anthony Olusanya.

On 1 February 2025, Plange joined Scottish Premiership club Motherwell on loan until the end of the season.

On 17 July 2025, he signed a three-year contract with Swiss Super League side Grasshopper Club Zurich. He had already joined the Swiss record champions during pre-season and was able to impress in the test matches. Plange was selected to the starting lineup in the first game of the season and was able to score Grasshoppers' second goal after just 31 minutes, in the 2–3 home defeat to FC Luzern. On 17 December 2025, he scored four goals in a 6–2 away victory against Young Boys, which included a flawless hat-trick between the 85th and 92nd minutes of the game. With just seven minutes between his second and fourth goals, this was the second fastest hat-trick scored in the Swiss Super League.

== International career ==
On 25 March 2022, he made his England U20 debut in a 2–0 defeat to Poland in Bielsko-Biała.

== Personal life ==
Born in England, Plange is of Malaysian descent through a grandmother.

== Career statistics ==
As of 1 March 2026

Appearances and goals by club, season and competition
| Club | Season | Division | League | | Cup (Note: Includes FA Cup, Belgian Cup, Finnish Cup) | | League cup (Note: Includes EFL Cup and Finnish League Cup) | | Europe | | Other | | Total | |
| Club | Season | Division | Apps | Goals | Apps | Goals | Apps | Goals | Apps | Goals | Apps | Goals | Apps | Goals |
|---|---|---|---|---|---|---|---|---|---|---|---|---|---|---|
| Derby County | 2021–22 (Note: Part of this season was spent on loan from Crystal Palace) | Championship | 26 | 4 | 1 | 0 | 0 | 0 | — | | — | | 27 | 4 |
| Crystal Palace | 2021–22 | Premier League | 0 | 0 | 0 | 0 | 0 | 0 | — | | — | | 0 | 0 |
| Crystal Palace | 2022–23 | Premier League | 0 | 0 | 0 | 0 | 0 | 0 | — | | — | | 0 | 0 |
| Crystal Palace | 2024–25 | Premier League | 0 | 0 | 0 | 0 | 0 | 0 | — | | — | | 0 | 0 |
| RWD Molenbeek (loan) | 2022–23 | Challenger Pro League | 14 | 2 | 2 | 0 | — | | — | | — | | 16 | 2 |
| Lincoln City (loan) | 2022–23 | League One | 18 | 0 | — | | — | | — | | — | | 18 | 0 |
| Carlisle United (loan) | 2023–24 | League One | 22 | 2 | 1 | 0 | 1 | 0 | — | | 2 (Note: Appearances in EFL Trophy) | 0 | 26 | 2 |
| HJK Helsinki (loan) | 2024 | Veikkausliiga | 26 | 6 | 1 | 0 | 0 | 0 | 9 (Note: Appearances in UEFA Champions League and UEFA Conference League) | 1 | — | | 36 | 7 |
| Motherwell (loan) | 2024–25 | Scottish Premiership | 4 | 0 | 0 | 0 | 0 | 0 | – | | – | | 4 | 0 |
| Grasshopper | 2025–26 | Swiss Super League | 23 | 9 | 3 | 0 | – | | – | | – | | 26 | 9 |
| Career total | | | 133 | 23 | 8 | 0 | 1 | 0 | 9 | 1 | 2 | 0 | 143 | 24 |
