= Sven Köhler (footballer, born 1996) =

German footballer

Personal information
- Date of birth: 8 November 1996 (age 29)
- Place of birth: Warstein, Germany
- Height: 1.85 m (6 ft 1 in)
- Position: Midfielder

Team information
- Current team: AEK Larnaca
- Number: 23

Youth career
- –2012: Borussia Dortmund
- 2012–2014: VfL Bochum
- 2014–2015: Schalke 04

Senior career*
Years	Team	Apps	(Gls)
2013–2014	Bochum	0	(0)
2014–2017	Schalke 04 II	1	(0)
2017–2019	SV Lippstadt	71	(3)
2019–2023	Osnabrück	92	(7)
2021	→ Verl (loan)	13	(0)
2023–2024	OB	22	(0)
2024–2026	Eintracht Braunschweig	47	(0)
2026	Grasshopper	12	(0)
2026–	AEK Larnaca	6	(1)
- * Club domestic league appearances and goals as of 1 November 2026

Sven Köhler (born 8 November 1996) is a German professional footballer who plays as a midfielder for AEK Larnaca.

== Career ==
Köhler made his professional debut for VfL Osnabrück in the 2. Bundesliga on 2 August 2019, coming on as a substitute in the 90+4th minute for Anas Ouahim in the 1–0 away win against SV Sandhausen.

On 24 June 2023, Köhler joined Danish Superliga club OB on a deal until June 2026. Ahead of the 2024-25 season, he signed with Köhler 2. Bundesliga club Eintracht Braunschweig.

On 9 February 2026, he transferred to Swiss Super League side Grasshopper Club Zürich. He joins the Swiss record champions on a contract until summer 2028. Just a day later, he was nominated to the starting lineup in Grasshoppers' away match against FC Luzern. However, he had a less than ideal beginning to life in Zurich, as he scored an own-goal, putting Luzern up 3–2 in the 50th minute of the game. Grasshoppers would go on to lose the match 4–3. On 17 July 2026, Köhler's contract with Grasshopper was mutually terminated.

== Honours ==
Individual

- Danish Superliga Team of the Month: July 2023
