= Gerald Scheiblehner =

Austrian footballer and manager

Personal information
- Date of birth: 25 February 1977 (age 49)
- Place of birth: Linz, Austria
- Height: 1.81 m (5 ft 11 in)
- Position: Midfielder

Team information
- Current team: Grazer AK (manager)

Youth career
- 1983-1996: VOEST Linz
- 1995-1996: SC Marchtrenk

Senior career*
Years	Team	Apps	(Gls)
1996–2001	Austria Wien II	28	(2)
1998	Austria Wien	1	(0)
2000–2001	→ASKÖ Donau Linz (loan)	34	(1)
2001–2003	Eintracht Wels	39	(8)
2003	Vöcklabruck	0	(0)
2003–2009	Wallern	82	(3)

Managerial career
- 2010–2014: ASKÖ Donau Linz
- 2014–2015: Union St. Florian
- 2015–2019: Vorwärts Steyr
- 2019–2021: Juniors OÖ
- 2021–2025: Blau-Weiß Linz
- 2025–2026: Grasshopper
- 2026–: Grazer AK
- * Club domestic league appearances and goals

Gerald Scheiblehner (born 25 February 1977) is an Austrian professional football manager who is currently manager of Austrian Bundesliga club Grazer AK.

== Career ==
=== Player ===
Scheiblehner is a youth product of VOEST Linz and SC Marchtrenk. He had a stint as a professional footballer with Austria Wien, where he mostly played for their reserves. He had a short loan with ASKÖ Donau Linz, before moving to Eintracht Wels in 2021. After a short stint with Vöcklabruck, he finished his career with Wallern from 2003 to 2009.

=== Manager ===
After he ended his playing career, he became coach and sporting of ASKÖ Donau Linz in the Austrian Landesliga. He caught attention for strong league finishes and youth development in his 4 years there. In 2014 he became coach of Union St. Florian in the Austrian Regionalliga. From 2015 to 2019 he trained SK Vorwärts Steyr. In 2017–18 the club was promoted to the 2. Liga after coming 3rd in the league and winning the playoffs, and extended his contract until 2020. In 2019, he became coach of Juniors OÖ in the 2. Liga. On 18 June 2021, he moved to Blau-Weiß Linz. He helped Blau-Weiß Linz win the 2022–23 Austrian Football Second League, was named coach of the season in the division, and earned them promotion to the Austrian Football Bundesliga.

He departed BW Linz on 23 June 2025. One day later, he was confirmed as the new head coach of Swiss Super League side Grasshopper Club Zürich. He signs on a two year contract until 2027. He was relieved of his duties on 16 March 2026, due to ongoing poor results. Since the new year, he was only able to achieve one win in the league with Grasshoppers. His final match in charge, saw the team lose 1–5 away at league leaders FC Thun two days prior. With just five league victories, he only achieved a 0.8 points per game average.

Scheiblehner was appointed manager of Grazer AK on 24 August 2026. His first match in charge was a 0–0 draw with Wolfsberger AC, ending a 2-game losing streak.

== Personal life ==
Scheiblehner has been married to his wife for over 18 years and together they have three sons.

== Honours ==
Blau-Weiß Linz

- 2. Liga: 2022–23
