= Peter Zeidler =

German football manager (born 1962)

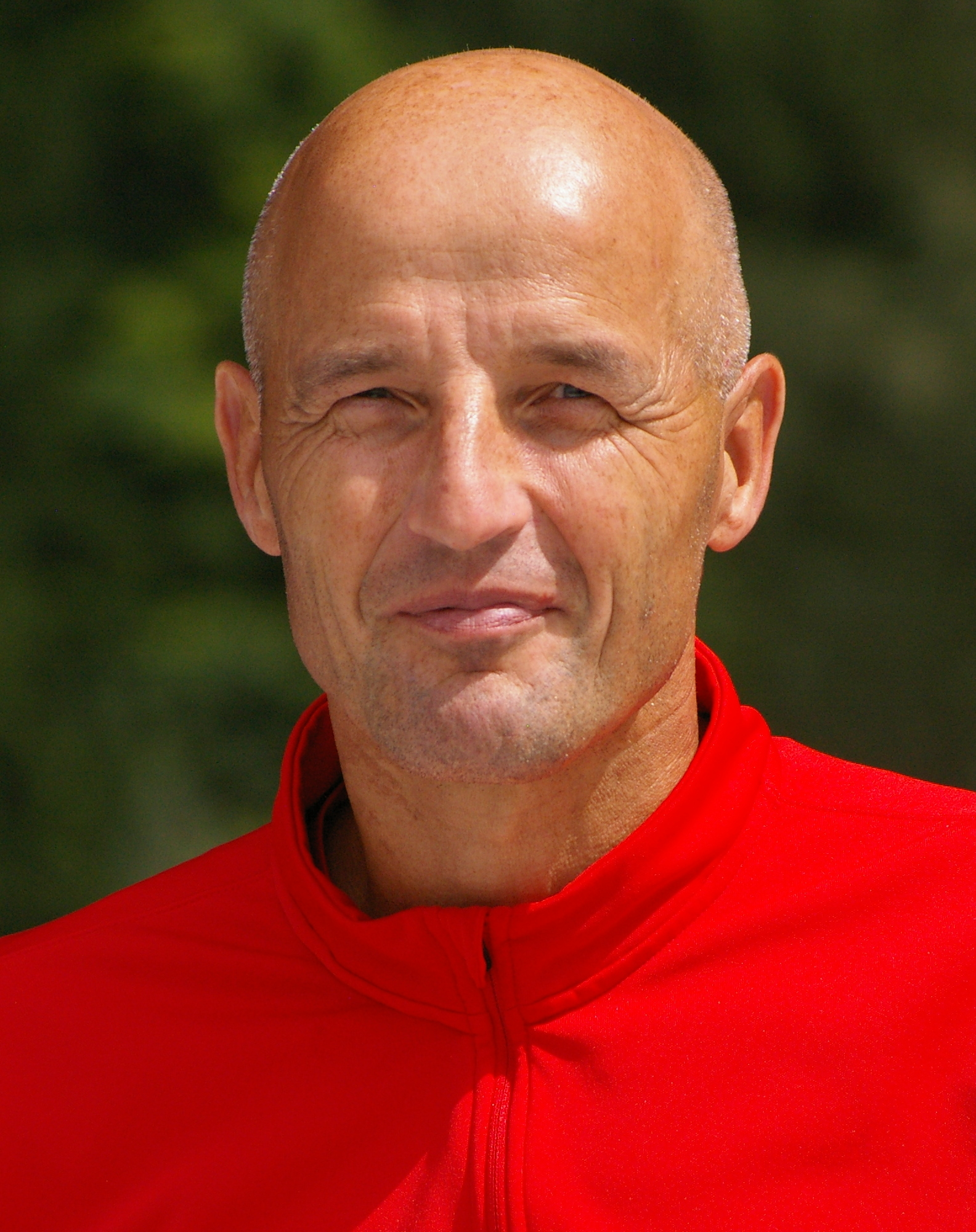
- Zeidler in 2014

Personal information
- Date of birth: 8 August 1962 (age 64)
- Place of birth: Schwäbisch Gmünd, West Germany
- Height: 1.84 m (6 ft 0 in)

Managerial career
- Years: Team
- 1993–1995: SV 03 Tübingen (player-coach)
- 1996–1998: TSV Böbingen (player-coach)
- 2002–2004: VfR Aalen
- 2005–2007: 1. FC Nürnberg II
- 2007–2008: Stuttgarter Kickers
- 2011–2012: Tours
- 2012–2015: FC Liefering
- 2015: Red Bull Salzburg
- 2016–2017: Sion
- 2017–2018: Sochaux
- 2018–2024: St. Gallen
- 2024: VfL Bochum
- 2025–2026: FC Lausanne-Sport
- 2026: Grasshopper

Peter Zeidler (born 8 August 1962) is a German professional football manager who was most recently the manager of Swiss Super League club Grasshopper.

== Coaching career ==
Zeidler started his coaching career with VfR Aalen in 2002 and was appointed manager of 1. FC Nürnberg II three years later. Following a one-year spell as manager of Stuttgarter Kickers, he spent three years as Ralf Rangnick's assistant at TSG 1899 Hoffenheim before joining French Ligue 2 side Tours as the head coach in 2011. In 2012, he went on to FC Liefering, the second team of Red Bull Salzburg. On 22 June 2015, he became head coach of the first team. On 3 December 2015, he was replaced by Thomas Letsch, who like Zeidler, also came from FC Liefering.

On 1 June 2017, Zeidler was named manager of FC Sochaux-Montbéliard.

On 3 June 2024, after six years at the helm of FC St. Gallen, he departed the club to take up the mantle at VfL Bochum. He was sacked in October 2024.

On 21 June 2025, he returned to the Swiss Super League, taking the helm at FC Lausanne-Sport. He lasted less than ten months in the job, as he was relieved of his duties on 16 April 2026.

On 1 May 2026, he was announced as the new head coach of Grasshopper, and officially took charge on 4 May.
