= Sports riot =

Riot that occurs during or after a sporting event

A sports riot is a riot that occurs during or after sporting events. Sports riots occur worldwide. Most riots are known to occur after the event is done, but some have been during the game (see football hooliganism). While association football is one of the more well-known triggers for riots, other sports which have triggered riots include ice hockey and motorcycle racing. There are a number of factors believed to influence whether riots occur, including cultural factors; environmental factors such as temperature, darkness, and noise; and witnessing player violence.

== Examples ==
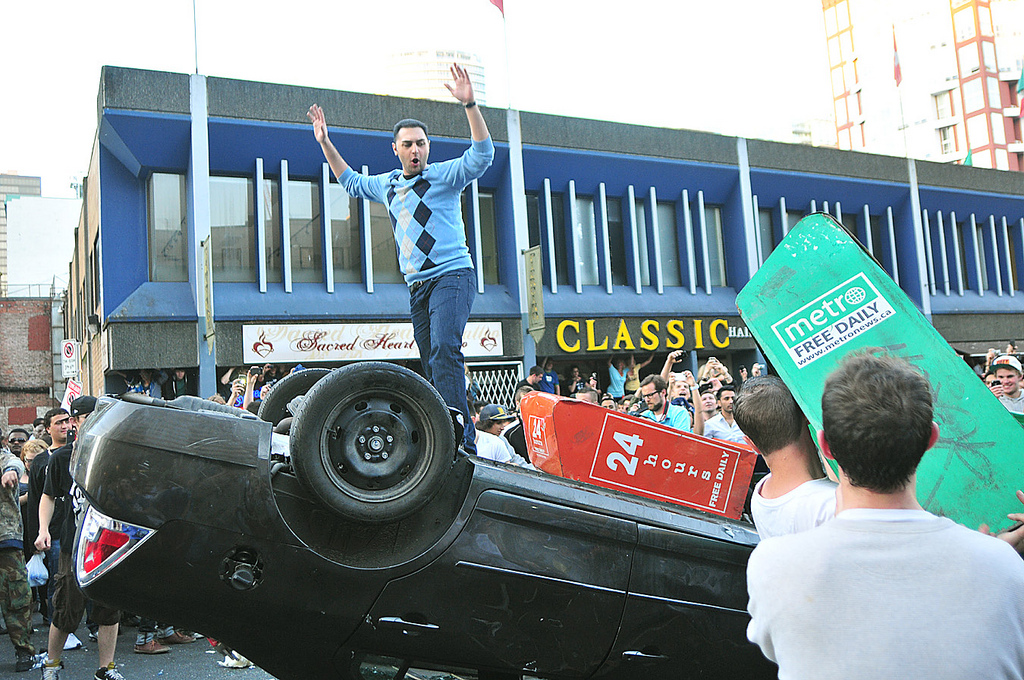
A rioter stands on a car during the 2011 Vancouver Stanley Cup riot

The following are various examples of a sports riot:

Riot name	From	Until	Description
Pompeii Amphitheatre riot	59		A riot broke out between local Pompeiians and visiting Nucerians which escalated from taunts to stone throwing to assaults with swords. The Pompeiians fared better with many wounded and killed Nucerians. The emperor ordered the senate to investigate the affair, which was done by the consuls, the results of which led the senate to forbid Pompeii from holding similar events for 10 years.
Nika riots	532		In what is known to be one of the first forms of sports rioting, supporters of the chariot racing teams, the Greens and Blues, revolted against the Byzantine Empire's leader Justinian. At least half of the Empire's capital of Constantinople (now Istanbul) was burned by the rioters, and 30,000 people were killed. Soldiers under the Roman generals Narses and Belisarius trapped the rioters in the Hippodrome and slaughtered them.
(Scotland) 1909 Scottish Cup Final	April 17, 1909		After the Scottish Cup ended in a tie, instead of going into extra time, an angry crowd invaded the pitch and tore down the goalposts, as well as attacking the mounted police, resulting in over 100 injuries.
(United States) Johnson–Jeffries riots	July 4, 1910		After African-American boxer Jack Johnson defeated the "Great White Hope" James J. Jeffries in the "Fight of the Century", race riots erupted in dozens of U.S. cities.
(Canada) Richard Riot	March 17, 1955		After the suspension of Montreal Canadiens great Maurice Richard, angry fans wrought havoc in Montreal, and Richard had to make a public appeal to end the riot.
(United States) The Roosevelt Raceway Riot	November 8, 1963		In an evening race at the former Roosevelt Raceway racetrack in Westbury, New York, two horses finished following a mid-race crash. The race was declared official, and it angered the 23,127 fans in attendance that night, setting off a riot. The fans were throwing bottles and other debris, and then jumping over the railing, smashing the tote board, followed by them attacking a judges booth. Finally, the fans set fires, as arriving firemen set their hoses on the rioters to push them back. 15 people were treated for injuries.
(Peru) 1964 Lima football riot	May 24, 1964		In the worst riot in association football history, the host Peru was losing to Argentina, and before the game ended, the fans ultimately rioted, and the police fired tear gas into the crowd, as well as padlocking the gates, leading to 318 deaths, with many from asphyxia.
(Sweden) Båstad riots	May 3, 1968		Demonstrators protested the participation of Rhodesia and South Africa in the Davis Cup, which led to intervention from the Swedish Police.
1971 South Africa rugby union tour of Australia	1971		In South Africa's tour, anti-apartheid groups protested, resulting in a state of emergency in Queensland, leading to 700 people being arrested.
(United States) Ten Cent Beer Night	June 4, 1974		Ten Cent Beer Night was a promotion held by Major League Baseball's Cleveland Indians during a game against the Texas Rangers at Cleveland Stadium on Tuesday, June 4, 1974. The idea behind the promotion was to attract more fans to the game by offering 12 U.S. fl oz (354.9 ml) cups of 3.2% beer for just 10 cents each (regular price was 65 cents) with a limit of six per purchase. During the game, fans became heavily intoxicated, culminating in a riot in the ninth inning.
(United States) Disco Demolition Night	July 12, 1979		Disco Demolition Night was an ill-fated baseball promotion that took place on July 12, 1979, at Comiskey Park in Chicago, Illinois. At the climax of the event, a crate filled with disco records was blown up on the field between games of the twi-night doubleheader between the Chicago White Sox and the Detroit Tigers. Many of those in attendance had come to see the explosion rather than the games and rushed onto the field after the detonation. The playing field was damaged both by the explosion and by the rowdy fans to the point where the White Sox were required to forfeit the second game of the doubleheader to the Tigers.
1981 South Africa rugby union tour of New Zealand	1981		10 years after the controversial tour of Australia, South Africa began its tour of New Zealand, and like the '71 tour, South Africa became an international pariah due to its apartheid law. Protestors eventually revolted and broke into the country stadiums before and during games, leading to 2 of the games being cancelled.
(United States) Detroit 1984 World Series Riot	1984		After the Detroit Tigers' World Series victory over the San Diego Padres in 1984, riots broke out that killed one person and left 80 injured and eight rapes reported. Millions of dollars in property damage including a burned squad car and taxi. Rocks and glass bottles were reportedly thrown at police who were wearing riot gear.
(United States) Aggieville Riots	1984	1986	In 1984 and 1986, after 2 college football games between rivals Kansas State and Kansas, a group of 6,000 celebrating KSU fans, after a 24–7 victory, crowded into a bar, and eventually became rowdy, and initiated a riot. 2 years later, after KSU once again defeated KU, this time 29–12, another group of 6,000 KSU fans, this time wearing "Riotville" shirts, rioted again, and also torched a Volkswagen Beetle.
(China) 19 May incident	May 19, 1985		In Workers Stadium, rioting Chinese fans were silenced by the People's Armed Police.
(Belgium) Heysel Stadium disaster	May 29, 1985		Before the 1985 European Cup final at Heysel Stadium in Brussels, Juventus fans, fleeing an attack by Liverpool supporters, were crushed against a decaying wall that collapsed under pressure. The stadium was poorly maintained and had failed inspections. The violence stemmed from clashes in a “neutral” section divided only by flimsy fencing. 39 people—mostly Juventus fans—were killed and over 600 injured. Despite the tragedy, the match went ahead, with Juventus winning 1–0.
(Canada) 1986 Montreal Stanley Cup riot	1986		After the Canadiens won the finals, fans took to the streets to celebrate, and ended up rioting.
(United States) 1990 Detroit riot	June 15, 1990		Widespread rioting occurred in Detroit after the Detroit Pistons won the 1990 NBA Finals. Eight people were killed.
(United States) Chicago Bulls championship riots	1991	1997	Rioting and looting occurred in Chicago after the Chicago Bulls won the NBA Finals in 1991, 1992, 1993, 1996 and 1997
(Canada) 1993 Montreal Stanley Cup riot	June 9, 1993		A year before the riot in Vancouver, Montreal experienced a riot shortly after their Canadiens defeated the Los Angeles Kings in the 1993 Stanley Cup Final, as victory celebrations mutated into unrest. In the epicenter of the riots, Ste. Catherine St., stores were looted and police cars were set on fire. The riots eventually caused $2.5 million in damage, $4.8 million in 2025 dollars.
(Canada) 1994 Vancouver Stanley Cup riot	June 14, 1994		The National Hockey League's Vancouver Canucks lost to the New York Rangers in Game 7 of the 1994 Stanley Cup Final. In what was supposed to be a congregation of 50 to 70 thousand fans led to riot after a man fell into the crowd. Policemen attempted to aid the man on bicycles, which the fans attempted to take, and the police fired tear gas into the fans, initiating the riot.
(Republic of Ireland) 1995 Lansdowne Road riot	February 15, 1995		During a friendly football match between the Republic of Ireland and England in Lansdowne Road Stadium in Dublin, Ireland on 15 February 1995 and due to the ongoing Troubles, England fans were extremely unruly, as well as violent, and wound up forcing the match to be abandoned after 27 minutes.
(England) 1996 Trafalgar Square riots	June 26, 1996		After the England national football team was defeated by Germany in the knockout stage of UEFA Euro 1996 at Wembley Stadium, hooligans took over Trafalgar Square in the West End of London. Up to 2,000 hooligans, many drunk, pelted police and civilians with bottles, smashed windows and shops and overturned cars. 66 people were injured and over 200 arrests were made.
2000 UEFA Cup semi-final violence	5 April 2000		in Istanbul, Turkey, between fans of English football team Leeds United and Turkish team Galatasaray on 5 April 2000, the day before the first match of their UEFA Cup semi-final, led to two Leeds fans being stabbed to death by Galatasaray fans. Four men were arrested and charged with their murders. The deaths led to an angry reaction in England with Galatasaray fans being banned from attending the second leg in England.
(Denmark) 2000 UEFA Cup Final riots	May 17, 2000		The Wednesday before the UEFA Cup Final, a fan from Copenhagen was stabbed, and eventually, a group of Galatasaray fans confronted and provoked a group of Arsenal fans in a bar, starting a brawl. Later, approximately 500 Arsenal fans attacked from the main road behind the Galatasaray fans. This caused a severe riot in the city square with several restaurant facilities used by fans to fight each other with iron bars and knives also being used. This lasted about 20 minutes before the police attempted to break up the fight with tear gas. The violence, which reportedly included fans from other Premier League clubs, lasted for 45 minutes. There were further also clashes at the airport the day after the game.
(Canada) 2006 Edmonton Riots	May 12, 2006		Following a playoff victory against the San Jose Sharks, up to 30,000 fans of the Edmonton Oilers flooded onto Whyte Avenue to celebrate, with vandalism breaking out and bonfires being built on the street. 49 arrests were made, 8 of which were riot-related
(Switzerland) 2006 Basel Hooligan Incident	May 13, 2006		Fans of FC Basel 1893 stormed St. Jakob-Park in the waning minutes of a game against FC Zürich. Zürich eventually scored, and ended Basel's chances of a threepeat Swiss Super League championship. In an attack of Zürich player Iulian Filipescu, who scored the winning goal, a flare was thrown at him, and Filipescu and teammate Alhassane Keita was forced to kick at the fans before police detained the hooligans.
Denmark v Sweden	2 June 2007		During a Euro 2008 qualifying Group F match between the national football teams of Sweden and Denmark, at the Parken Stadium in Copenhagen on 2 June 2007, a Danish supporter ran onto the pitch and attacked referee Herbert Fandel, by grabbing his neck, after the referee had awarded Sweden a penalty in the 89th minute of the match and sent off Danish midfielder Christian Poulsen for punching Swedish striker Markus Rosenberg in the stomach, causing the match to be abandoned.
(Italy) Catania football riot	February 2, 2007		A Serie A match between Catania and Palermo, a derby between two of the three Serie A club that hail from Sicily (the other being Messina) was played on February 2, 2007 at 18:00, Palermo were leading 1–0 thanks to a controversial goal by Andrea Caracciolo leading to the throwing of smoke bombs and firecrackers, forcing the police to reply by throwing tear gas canisters towards the Ultras (groups of football supporters). As a result, the match referee Stefano Farina decided to suspend the match for over 40 minutes. After the end of the match, won 2–1 by Palermo, Catania supporters outside the venue began attacking members of the police force; Raciti died during these incidents.
(Italy) 2007 A.S. Roma–Manchester United F.C. conflict	April 4, 2007		During a game between A.S. Roma and Manchester United F.C., groups of fans started throwing missiles over a barrier that was to separate the fans, prompting Italian riot police to enter the stadium, which eventually sparked a brawl.
(Canada) 2008 Montreal riot	2008		After the Canadiens defeated the Boston Bruins in the first round of the 2008 Stanley Cup playoffs, fans began rioting in celebration.
2008 Congo football riots	14 September 2008		On Sunday 14 September 2008, a riot broke out in connection with a football game in Butembo, in the province of Nord-Kivu, in the eastern part of the Democratic Republic of the Congo. The teams playing were Socozaki and Nyuki System, which are two local clubs whose games are considered derbies. The riots were sparked by accusations that one of the football players was using witchcraft. Nyuki were losing the game, and their goalkeeper tried to advance up the pitch and cast a spell that would turn the game around. This caused a brawl between the players, and when a police commander tried to intervene, he was pelted by stones from the spectators. To regain control of the situation, the police forces reportedly fired canisters of tear gas into the crowd, an action that caused a stampede
(England) 2009 Upton Park riot	August 25, 2009		Occurred in and around West Ham United's Boleyn Ground, in Upton Park before, during and after a Football League Cup second round match between West Ham and Millwall on 25 August 2009. The match was won by the home side 3–1 after extra time, but the game was marred by pitch invasions and disorder in the streets outside the ground, where a Millwall supporter was stabbed.
2009 NK Široki Brijeg–FK Sarajevo football riots	October 4, 2009		Involving football clubs NK Široki Brijeg (supported mostly by Herzegovian Croat fans) and FK Sarajevo (supported mostly by Bosniak fans) during a 2009 Bosnian-Herzegovian Premier League match in the Herzegovian town of Široki Brijeg. During the riot members of Horde Zla ("Legions of Evil", a FK Sarajevo supporters group) and Škripari (a NK Široki Brijeg supporters group) confronted each other in altercations which subsequently spilled out to the majority of the town. Horde Zla burned cars and demolished shops while Škripari and residents of Široki Brijeg stoned Horde Zla buses and shot at supporters. Horde Zla also claim multiple counts of severe police brutality which led to the death of Horde Zla member Vedran Puljić from gunshot wounds
(United States) 2010 Lakers riot	June 17, 2010		After the Los Angeles Lakers defeated the Boston Celtics in game seven of the NBA Finals, fans rioted in celebration.
(Canada) 2010 Montreal riot	2010		Montreal was stricken with a fifth riot after the Canadiens defeated the Pittsburgh Penguins in Game 7 of the Eastern Conference Semifinals of the 2010 Stanley Cup playoffs.
(Canada) 2011 Vancouver Stanley Cup riot	June 15, 2011		Seventeen years after the 1994 riot, Vancouver was faced with a second riot, after the Canucks lost, also in Game 7, to the Boston Bruins. Unlike in 1994, the fans met at giant screens, where Game 7 was being televised. Shortly before the game's end, fans began throwing bottles at the screen, as well as burning Canuck and Bruin jerseys and flags. The riot eventually escalated when fans began overturning and burning cars. In all, the fans burned 17 cars, as well as a fire truck, and ultimately, 85 rioters were arrested.
(Switzerland) 2011 Zurich hooligan incident	2 October 2011		A Swiss Football League game between FC Zürich and Grasshopper Club Zürich (known as the Zürich derby) at Letzigrund Stadium saw the game abandoned with approximately 15 minutes of regular time to go after a masked FC Zürich fan threw a lit flare into the Grasshopper Club Zürich fan sector, the incident incited a violent reaction from the Grasshopper Club Zürich fans. Several dozen masked Grasshopper Club Zürich fans rushed towards the fence separating the two groups and attempted to fight back with flagpoles.
(Serbia) 2012 European Men's Handball Championship riots	January 24, 2012	January 25, 2012	After a match between Croatia and France, Serbian hooligans attacked several Croatian fans, including a notable incident where a group of Croatian fans who were heading home were attacked by 50 masked men with axes, stones and bricks, and a fan was stabbed, with a Croatian van being set alight.
(Egypt) Port Said Stadium riot	February 1, 2012		In Port Said, Egypt, 79 people were killed by Al-Masry Club fans using knives, swords, clubs, stones, bottles, and fireworks as weapons, who were attacking the Al-Ahly S.C. players.
(United States) 2014 World Series civil unrest	October 29, 2014	October 30, 2014	After the San Francisco Giants defeated the Kansas City Royals in the 2014 World Series, Giants fans set fires, vandalized buses and police cars, shattered windows of businesses, scrawled graffiti, and threw bottles at police. Two people were shot, one person was stabbed, and a police officer was badly hurt from fireworks exploding. 40 arrests were made.
(United States) 2016 World Series	November 2, 2016	November 3, 2016	After the Chicago Cubs defeated the Cleveland Indians in the 2016 World Series, 14 people were arrested for disorderly and reckless conduct.
(United States) Super Bowl LII	February 4, 2018	February 5, 2018	When the Philadelphia Eagles defeated the New England Patriots in Super Bowl LII, fans in Philadelphia reportedly flipped 1 car, tore down traffic lights outside Philadelphia City Hall, and collapsed an awning outside a city hotel. On the same night, 6 fans of the New England Patriots were arrested in Amherst, Massachusetts.
(England) UEFA Euro 2020	July 11, 2021		On the day of the UEFA Euro 2020 final between Italy and England riots broke out at the entrance to Wembley Stadium shortly after kick off, and after the match in Piccadilly Circus, Leicester Square and Trafalgar Square. A McDonalds was looted, a Burger King was looted and a Portuguese flag was burnt in Leicester Square. 86 people were arrested by police that day.
(Mexico) Querétaro–Atlas riot	March 5, 2022		During a match between Querétaro F.C. and Atlas F.C., supporters from both clubs erupted into violence at the second half, causing the match to be suspended.
(United States) 2023 NCAA Division I men's basketball championship game	April 3, 2023	April 4, 2023	After the UConn Huskies defeated the San Diego State Aztecs in the 2023 NCAA Division I men's basketball championship game, 16 people were hospitalized and 22 people were arrested after a riot broke out on the University of Connecticut campus. Fans flipped cars and started fires, in addition to tearing down light poles and using them as battering rams to break into campus buildings.
(United States) 2024 World Series	October 30, 2024	October 31, 2024	Los Angeles experienced unrest after the Los Angeles Dodgers defeated the New York Yankees in Game 5 of the World Series in New York on October 30th. Dodgers fans celebrated by taking to the streets of Los Angeles to loot stores, tagged buildings with graffiti, and violently confront police who tried to stop the riot. At around 12:30 AM PT the following day, the Los Angeles Police Department reported that fans set a MTA bus on fire.
(Netherlands) November 2024 Amsterdam riots	November 7, 2024		Riots broke out in Amsterdam following a UEFA Europa League football match between Israeli club Maccabi Tel Aviv and Dutch club AFC Ajax where Maccabi Tel Aviv fans were actively targeted, kicked, beaten, stabbed, thrown into the river, spat on, and even ran over by cars. Maccabi Tel Aviv fans were also seen pulling Palestinian flags from local houses, chanting anti-Arab slurs, assaulting people, and vandalising local buildings as well as a taxi. The attacks came amid the Gaza war and were denounced as antisemitic, Islamophobic, and racist towards Arabs.
(El Salvador) March 2025 Santa Ana riot	March 30, 2025		A riot broke out in a Primera División de Fútbol de El Salvador match between C.D. FAS and C.D. Águila known to be as the El Clásico where the FAS fans attacked Águila's bus with rocks outside the Óscar Alberto Quiteño Stadium. Subsequently, media outlets such as the Super Fútbol series reported that authorities from the Policía Nacional Civil (PNC) Law Enforcement Unit (UMO) took action and detained several suspected Santa Ana fans near the stadium. Águila later that day at 7:05.pm, published images of the attack in social media. Afterward, Águila's captain Darwin Cerén was stern in his rebuke of the incident. "Thank God it didn't hit our teammate Tereso Benítez. These people are so mediocre, actually doing this, throwing rocks at the bus. What's the point in doing it? Football is for having a good time with family and friends, not for inciting violence, please." he said. What was revealed is that Águila like its captain Cerén reported many Santa Ana fans to security forces, and several fans were detained by the PNC.
(France) 2025 Paris Saint-Germain celebration riots	May 31, 2025	June 1, 2025	Rioting primarily in Paris but also across France after Paris Saint-Germain won the 2025 UEFA Champions League final. Two people killed.
(France) 2026 Paris Saint-Germain celebration riots	May 30, 2026	May 31, 2026	Rioting primarily in Paris but also across France after Paris Saint-Germain won the 2026 UEFA Champions League final. One person killed.
(United States) 2026 Knicks riot	June 13, 2026		After the New York Knicks defeated the San Antonio Spurs in game five of the NBA Finals, fans rioted in celebration.
