= 2022 UEFA Champions League final chaos =

Incidents at the Stade de France

2022 UEFA Champions League final
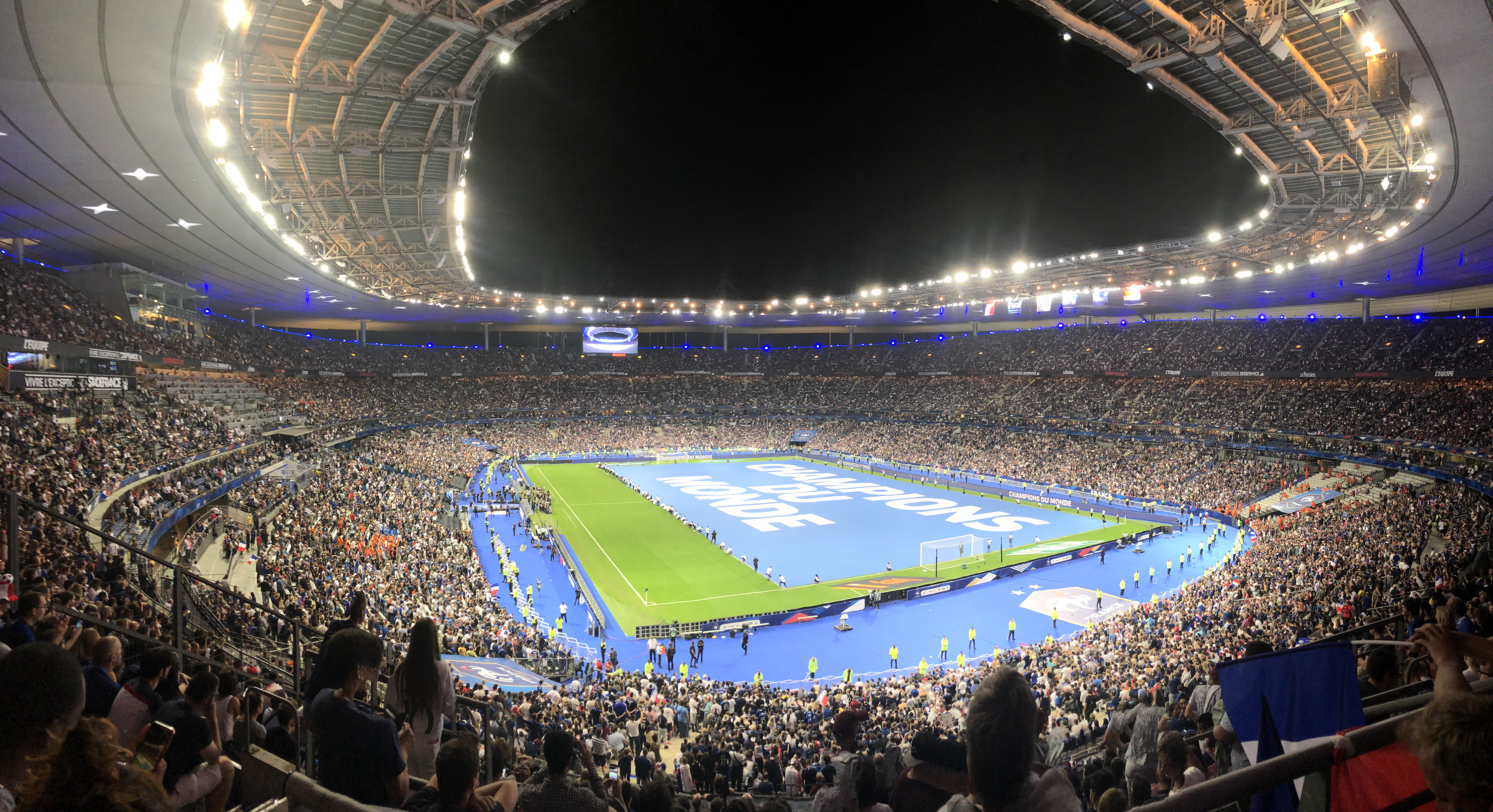
- Stade de France, host venue for the final
- Date: 28 May 2022
- Venue: Stade de France
- Location: Saint-Denis, France
- Organised by: UEFA
- Injuries: ≈ 238
- Arrests: 68
- Accused: Liverpool supporters, Paris Police Prefecture, UEFA

Prior to the 2022 UEFA Champions League final between English team Liverpool and Spanish team Real Madrid on the evening of 28 May 2022, crowd control descended into chaos at the entrances to the Stade de France in the suburb of Saint-Denis, France.

With a large build-up of fans around the stadium unable to gain access to the stadium in the hours prior to the scheduled kick-off time of 21:00 CEST, French police used tear gas and pepper spray on Liverpool fans. These actions were later defended by organisers UEFA and several French political figures, who accused supporters of Liverpool, of whom tens of thousands had travelled to the city, of disorderly conduct, including attempting to gain access to the stadium with counterfeit tickets and penetrating the stadium illegally. This led to the game beginning 36 minutes behind schedule, and resulted in dozens of arrests and hundreds of injuries.

Several supporters, journalists, and political figures disputed the initial story of fan disorder. They accused the organisers and security of major disorganisation and unpreparedness. A full enquiry was commissioned by UEFA. The report, which was published on 13 February 2023, stated that UEFA bore primary responsibility for the organisational and safety failures in the run-up to the match. The report criticised both the organisation and the French police, and rejected claims by both that only ticketless fans were to blame for the chaos. The report stated that there was insufficient evidence for asserting the validity of such claims, and that with these claims both UEFA and French authorities made "a reprehensible attempt to avoid responsibility".

France's Interior Minister at the time, Gérald Darmanin, later admitted that security arrangements for the final were wrong, and that his first public remarks – blaming Liverpool fans – were a mistake. "It was a failure because I had not foreseen. That was a mistake on my part. I was led astray by my preconceptions," he said, admitting that "The scapegoat was easy to find, and I apologise now to Liverpool supporters. They were quite right to be hurt. It was a mistake and a failure."

== Pre-match ==
=== Ticketing ===
Liverpool received a ticket allocation of 19,618, equating to 26.1% of the capacity of the Stade de France, with Real Madrid receiving a similar allocation of approximately 20,000. 12,000 were sold to the general public, and another 23,000 retained by UEFA to be distributed to "the local organising structure, UEFA and national associations, commercial partners and broadcasters". Liverpool supporters union Spirit of Shankly wrote an open letter to UEFA, criticising them for both the ticket allocation and the "exorbitant" prices, and received support from Liverpool manager Jürgen Klopp, who accused UEFA of focusing only on money and not on the supporters, and of hypocrisy for increasing their ticket price over the years while they condemned 'the greed' of clubs such as Liverpool who attempted to form a European Super League, in the context of tense relations between several top European football clubs, including Liverpool, and UEFA following the unsuccessful Super League formation attempt, and encouraged supporters to travel to Paris regardless of whether they had a ticket.

UEFA had requested that the sale of any paper tickets carry holograms. The Real Madrid paper tickets carried holograms while Liverpool F.C. declined to put holograms on their allocation of tickets. Tickets sold by UEFA were delivered electronically through the official UEFA Mobile Tickets app.

Liverpool F.C. required purchasers of its allocation of tickets to either collect from Anfield or pay a Special Delivery at a charge of £12.59 per booking. In the week before the final, there were reports of ticketing fraud in the British media and Liverpool F.C. called on social media companies to close more than 50 social media accounts involved in the sale of fake tickets.

Ticketing issues only impacted Liverpool fans. However, estimates of the extent of the ticketing problems associated with Liverpool's allocation varied widely. According to the Agence France-Presse, at least 2,800 fake tickets were detected at the stadium gates while the French Football Federation said that 35,000 people with fake or no tickets eventually showed up at the stadium. Paris police prefect Didier Lallement said there was a large-scale ticket fraud operation, of "30,000 to 40,000 tickets", though this number was alleged to be 2,589 by The New York Times. Some Liverpool supporters that had bought bona fide tickets said they were refused entry. Liverpool defender Andy Robertson said a friend of his was denied entry using an official ticket given by Robertson. 2,700 ticket holders who were refused entry were to be given refunds. Additionally, each club had a designated "fan zone" for supporters travelling to the city; Liverpool's was situated in Cours de Vincennes, seven miles away by train, during a railway strike, while Real Madrid's was in Parc de la Maison d'éducation de la Légion d'honneur, within walking distance. Over 7,000 police were on duty in the fan zones and the stadium. Madrid fans entered the stadium from the north, and were directed to arrive by metro, tram or by foot, from their nearby fan zone. The Liverpool fan zone was 10 km from the stadium, and calibrated to welcome 44,000. A later estimate however indicated that the number of supporters that came at the fanzone may possibly have raised to approximately 50,000, exceeding the capacity of the zone.

=== Stewardship ===
Liverpool fans were supposed to approach the stadium from train stations to the west and south of the stadium. They were directed to arrive on rail lines RER B and D. However the B line was running a partial service due to a strike. A larger than expected number of Liverpool supporters took the D line, which was also on a direct route from their fan zone.

Stewards on the outer perimeter were largely organised to check Liverpool ticket holders coming from the B line. However a large number of supporters came from the D line station. Stewards on the route set out for supporters coming from the D line station were in insufficient number and quickly overwhelmed. Liverpool fans were able to access the turnstiles at the immediate perimeter of the stadium, quickly leading to overcrowding and tension. Moreover, the approach was through a narrow enclosed pathway that quickly become clogged up as a dense crowd formed. The police requested that the stewards remove their controls at this point, for safety reasons. As a result, Liverpool fans were able to access the turnstiles at the immediate perimeter of the stadium, quickly leading to overcrowding and bottlenecks. With stewards unable to cope, many Liverpool supporters had great difficulties entering the stadium, even with valid tickets with codes that had not already been presented.

Gates at one point were closed entirely, with many supporters still waiting outside. Police used tear gas and pepper spray on supporters outside the stadium. By 21:00 local time, the originally scheduled kick-off time, thousands of seats remained empty in the Liverpool end. For "security reasons", the kick-off was initially delayed by 15 minutes to 21:15. This was further delayed by 15 minutes to 21:30, before being pushed back another 6 minutes to 21:36, eventually started at 21:37.

Liverpool Echo reported that "senior officials from Liverpool officially requested for the kick-off to be delayed after lobbying UEFA" but "a UEFA statement released during the game...claimed that supporters who 'had purchased fake tickets' were the reason why".

Merseyside Police officers, deployed at Stade de France "reported the vast majority of fans behaved in an exemplary manner, arriving at turnstiles early and queuing as directed".

Inside the stadium, messages on the public address system and the jumbotron attributed the delay to the "late arrival of fans"; Sky Sports News chief reporter Kaveh Solhekol disputed this, noting he arrived to the ground four hours before kick-off and was "quite shocked at how early supporters had turned up". Some of the journalists attending the match attributed the difficulties outside the stadium to the organisers. In a later statement, French police said "people attempted to penetrate the stadium", and that police had "intervened to push back people trying to force their way through", and blaming fans with "fake tickets" who were unable to enter through the turnstiles.

According to Football Supporters Europe (FSE) board member Pierre Barthulemy, the head of the French Interior Ministry's Anti-Hooligan Division, Thibaut Delaunay, was not present because he was visiting Qatar to assist with the organisation of the 2022 FIFA World Cup.

== Post-match ==
Following the match, large groups of thugs attacked, mugged, and robbed both sets of supporters, actions which were strategically organised by the perpetrators. Eye-witnesses said gangs of youths were "roaming around outside" the stadium waiting for fans to leave following the full-time whistle. French police arrested 68 people in total, while a reported 238 people received medical attention. MMA fighter Paddy Pimblett, who was at the match, compared the events after the game to scenes from the American dystopian film The Purge, alleging that there were "large groups of men armed with machetes, knives, bars and bats". According to the testimony of a police officer in Le Figaro, there was mass sexual assault. The secretary of Liverpool's disabled supporters group told BFM TV that he saw the sexual assault of a disabled young woman.

=== Response ===
==== Clubs ====
Immediately after the match, Liverpool requested a formal investigation into the causes of the issues. Liverpool chief executive officer Billy Hogan described the stadium entry and security issues, in addition to the treatment of supporters, as "absolutely unacceptable", said accusations being aimed at Liverpool supporters were "deeply hurtful", and continued to defend the behaviour of Liverpool supporters. By 31 May, the club had received over 5,000 responses after requesting experiences and issues encountered.

On 3 June, Real Madrid followed suit, requesting that "what were the reasons that motivated that designation of the venue for the final and what criteria were taken into consideration taking into account what was experienced that day", and "answers and explanations to determine who were those responsible for leaving the fans unattended and defenceless", highlighting that video evidence showcased fans being "assaulted, harassed, mugged and robbed with violence". Former Liverpool player Jason McAteer said that his wife and son had been attacked and robbed after the game with his wife's blouse being ripped open and her watch stolen. His son was kicked and his phone stolen.

==== Fans ====
The tactics and actions of the French police were heavily criticised and compared to the events of the 1989 Hillsborough disaster, in which police incompetence in crowd control contributed to a human crush that claimed the lives of 97 Liverpool fans. Several family members of Hillsborough victims who were in attendance at the final also compared the response of the police after the match to the response of South Yorkshire Police after the Hillsborough disaster; after Hillsborough, the then-prevailing narrative that drunken Liverpool fans were to blame was fostered by the police in concert with sympathetic journalists and politicians. Survivors of the Hillsborough disaster who also attended the final in Paris reported having their trauma triggered by the "mayhem" on display.

Former Liverpool players Kenny Dalglish, Robbie Fowler, Jim Beglin, and Jamie Carragher reported first and second-hand experiences which were highly critical of UEFA, the French police and Parisian locals. Ronan Evain, executive director of the FSE, condemned the comments, saying "there is a cheap, very old prejudice against Liverpool fans, and I think it has been used for political gain by the French government."

On 3 June, UEFA issued an apology to all of the Liverpool and Real Madrid supporters who "had to experience or witness frightening and distressing events".

==== Political ====
British Labour Party MP Ian Byrne described the entrance as "one of the worst experiences" in his life due to the "horrendous security and organisation putting lives at risk". The Prime Minister, Boris Johnson, and the Foreign Secretary, Liz Truss called for a full UEFA inquiry into how the chaos was allowed to unfold. Joanne Anderson, the Mayor of Liverpool criticised the "appalling management" of the match and the "brutal treatment" of Liverpool fans by the police and stadium officials and called their blaming of the Liverpool fans "shameful", comments followed with agreement by Secretary of State for Digital, Culture, Media and Sport Nadine Dorries and Parliamentary Under-Secretary of State for Sport, Tourism, Heritage and Civil Society Nigel Huddleston, the latter of which criticised the use of tear gas against young and elderly Liverpool fans.

French Sports minister Amélie Oudéa-Castéra and Minister of the Interior Gérald Darmanin both blamed the problems before the game on Liverpool supporters and their behaviour. This was disputed by reports of supporters from the ground which said it was disorganised and heavy-handed policing, claims that were relayed by British broadcaster Sky Sports, and newspaper The Daily Telegraph. Merseyside Police praised the behaviour of Liverpool fans, describing it as "exemplary in shocking circumstances". French politician and Member of the European Parliament Jérôme Rivière stated Darmanin's comments were a "lie", pressing him to "apologise to the British for having wrongly accused them and to the French for the shameful fake news". Further to her earlier comments, on 30 May Oudéa-Castéra blamed a mass gathering of supporters with fake tickets for the chaos at the stadium.

François-Noël Buffet, the President of the Law Committee, requested that Oudéa-Castéra and Darmanin should show proof for their post-game comments regarding counterfeit tickets. Richard Bouigue, the deputy-mayor of the 12th arrondissement of Paris, was the first French politician to apologise to Liverpool, writing a letter to their supporters' union Spirit of Shankly, in which he said regretted what had taken place. BBC News correspondent Hugh Schofield wrote that the fallout from the final had become an issue in the 2022 French legislative election to be held in June. Right-wing opponents of president Emmanuel Macron portrayed the chaos as stemming from locals from the banlieue of Saint-Denis, an area largely populated by immigrants and their descendants. French polling expert Jérôme Fourquet mentioned the events from the final as a reason why Macron's Ensemble Citoyens made losses at the elections, and Marine Le Pen's National Rally made large gains.

Polling by Odoxa-Backbone Consulting found that 53% of the French public were apprehensive about France hosting the 2023 Rugby World Cup and the 2024 Summer Olympics, and that 90% thought that the episode had harmed the nation's reputation abroad.

On 9 June, the chief of the Paris Police Prefecture, Didier Lallement apologised for the use of tear gas saying that the main aim of the police operation was to save lives. The same day, it was confirmed that the surveillance footage from the stadium of the French Football Federation, had been destroyed as it had not been claimed by the courts within seven days. The French police conserved their own footage however, and handed it over to the courts.

== UEFA inquiry and aftermath ==
On 30 May, UEFA announced they were commissioning an independent report into the events surrounding the final to examine the decision making, responsibility and behaviours of all entities involved, and would be led by Portuguese member of parliament Tiago Brandão Rodrigues on a pro bono basis. The report would be made public upon its completion, with UEFA evaluating the next steps to take.

The report, which was published on 13 February 2023, found that UEFA bore primary responsibility for the organisational and safety failures in the run-up to the match. The report criticised both the organisation and the French police, and rejected claims by both that ticketless fans were to blame. The report stated that there was insufficient evidence for asserting the validity of such claims, and that with these claims both UEFA and French authorities made "a reprehensible attempt to avoid responsibility". UEFA was criticised for marginalising its own safety and security unit, and for statements made during and after the match. The French police were also blamed for not working with other stakeholders, for failing to prevent or remedy congestion, and for using teargas and pepper sprays without justification. They were also criticised for not acting against local groups who attacked supporters. The report stated that these failures could have caused a mass-fatality crowd disaster.

UEFA General Secretary Theodore Theodoridis accepted the findings of the report, thanking Dr Rodrigues, and offering an apology to those who were affected, particularly the supporters of Liverpool FC 'for their experiences many of them had', and 'for the messages released prior to and during the game which had the effect of unjustly blaming them for the situation'. UEFA also promised to refund all Liverpool fans the cost of their tickets.

In May 2025, Darmanin formally apologised to Liverpool supporters for blaming them for the chaos, admitting that fans "were quite right to be hurt. It was a mistake and a failure."

== See also ==
- Hillsborough disaster
- Heysel Stadium disaster
- 2023 Rugby World Cup
- 2024 Summer Olympics
- 2025 Paris Saint-Germain celebration riots
- 2026 Paris Saint-Germain celebration riots
