= Paris Saint-Germain celebration riots =

Paris Saint-Germain celebration riots may refer to:

- 2025 Paris Saint-Germain celebration riots
- 2026 Paris Saint-Germain celebration riots
