= Zurich derby =

Football match between FC Zürich and Grasshopper Club Zurich

Zürich Derby
- Location: Zürich
- Teams: Grasshopper Club Zurich; FC Zürich
- First meeting: Grasshopper 7–2 FC Zürich (28 November 1897)
- Latest meeting: FC Zürich 2–1 Grasshopper (9 May 2026)
- Next meeting: Grasshopper – FC Zürich (5 September 2026)
- Stadiums: Letzigrund, Hardturm

Statistics
- Total meetings: 253
- Most wins: Grasshopper (122)
- All-time record: Grasshopper: 122; FC Zürich: 92; Drawn: 39
- Largest victory: Grasshopper 11-2 FC Zürich (6 December 1942); FC Zürich 6–0 Grasshopper (7 August 2011)

The Zürich derby (German: Zürcher Derby) is a football match between rivals FC Zürich and Grasshopper Club Zurich. The two teams were founded in Zürich, Switzerland. Grasshopper in 1886 and FC Zürich in 1896. Grasshoppers are historically known as the club of the elite, students and Zürcher upper-class and FCZ are known as the club of the working-class. The derby is unique in Switzerland as it is the only rivalry between two teams from the same city.

The first derby between the two Zurich clubs was held as part of the first Swiss championship, where GC defeated FC Zurich 7–2.

== Notable matches ==
=== 3 March 2004 ===
One of the most notable matches was the semifinal of the 2003–04 Swiss Cup. An early goal by Daniel Gygax and a disgraceful own goal by Reto Ziegler saw FCZ leading 0–2 after only eleven minutes. Mladen Petric managed to bring GC on the board in the 37th minute (2–1), but Gygax brought the half-time score to 1–3 in favor of FC Zurich.

After the break, Eduardo let GC hopes flare up again in the 57th minute (2–3). These hopes were quickly dashed by Daniel Gygax, who scored his 3rd goal of the match (2–4), and Cesar within two minutes shortly after. Cesar would receive his second yellow of the game due to excessive celebration and was sent off, but with a score of 2–5 in favor of FCZ, the match seemed over nonetheless. However, GC managed to rally, especially around Eduardo, who brought them back to a one-goal difference with two goals, his 2nd and 3rd of the match, in the 83rd (3–5) and 89th minute (4–5), respectively. GC's pressure did not let off and in the 90th minute Petric managed to score a rebound off FCZ goalkeeper Taini to equalize the game (5–5).

Five minutes into extra time, Richard Nuñez managed to bring GC in the lead for the first time of the match with an exceptional lob over goalie Taini. In the 106th minute, referee Urs Meier failed to call an obvious penalty for FCZ and in the following GC managed to win the game with a final score of 6–5 after extra time. GC advanced to the Cup Final, where they lost 2–3 to FC Wil.

=== 7 August 2011 ===
This match of the 2011–12 Swiss Super League went down as FC Zurich's highest derby victory to date. FC Zurich were clearly the better team and quickly took the upper hand. FCZ captain Silvan Aegerter opened the score in the 15th minute. Despite dominating and a long-distance shot by Dusan Djuric that hit the post, the first half ended with a 1–0 lead for FCZ.

Four minutes into the second half, Alexandre Alphonse expanded FCZ's lead to 2-0 and few minutes later (54th minute) Raphael Koch shot the 3–0. GC, unable to mount any sort of reaction, conceded three more times: Admir Mehmedi (67), Stjepan Kukuruzović (77), and Adrian Nikci (87) shot the fourth, fifth, and sixth goal for FCZ, respectively. Six different players shot FCZ's six goals of the match. GC's Bruno Bertucci was sent off in the 86th minute after his second yellow card.

=== 2 October 2011: Disgrace of Zurich ===
This Swiss Football League game between FC Zürich and Grasshopper Club Zurich at Letzigrund Stadium saw an incident of football hooliganism. The game had to be abandoned with approximately 15 minutes of regular time to go. Also dubbed the "Disgrace of Zürich" (German: Skandal/Schande von Zürich) by Swiss media, this incident represented a second major episode of hooligan violence in Switzerland within five years, after a hooligan incident of similar significance occurred in Basel in 2006. During the 74th minute of the match, with Grasshopper Club leading 2–1, a masked FC Zürich fan threw a lit flare into the Grasshopper fan sector. No one was seriously injured at this stage. However, the incident incited a violent reaction from the Grasshopper Club Zurich fans. Several dozen masked Grasshopper Club Zurich fans rushed towards the fence separating the two groups and attempted to fight back with flagpoles. The referee was forced to abandon the match due to safety concerns. Six people were injured in the riot that ensued.

=== 29 November 2015 ===
Grasshopper's highest derby victory of the 21st century was in this match and is a near opposite of the one four years prior. In the 15th minute, Munas Dabbur is able to take advantage of a colossal error by FCZ defender Berat Djimsiti and brings GC in the lead. Despite many chances for FCZ and a shot on the bar by GC's Shani Tarashaj, the first half ended 1–0.

After a slow start to the second half, Djimsiti fails to block GC captain Kim Källstrom's long pass into the box, where Yoric Ravet easily puts it past the goalkeeper (57th minute). Tarashaj scored seven minutes later (64), after a masterful double pass with Ravet, to make the score 3–0. Another seven minutes later (71), Caio leaves two FCZ defenders behind him and slides the ball past goalie Anthony Favre. In the 91st minute, Källstrom caps off the game with the 5–0.

== Statistics ==
=== Records ===
Grasshopper's largest win to date was an 11–2 victory over on 6 December 1942. FC Zurich's largest win was more recent, a 6–0 victory on 7 August 2011.

To date, FC Zurich only once managed to win all matchups in one season, 2014–15: 1–0, 3–1, 2–0, and 4–3 in the league and a 1–0 (a.e.t.) victory in the Swiss Cup. Grasshoppers have won all four matchups in season 1997–98: 2–1, 3–1, 2–0, and 2–1.

=== League Matches played since 1990 ===
FCZ Win Draw GCZ Win

		FC Zürich vs Grasshopper Club Zurich				Grasshopper Club Zurich vs FC Zürich			
Season	Division	Date	Venue	Score	Atten.	Date	Venue	Score	Atten.
1990–91	Nationalliga A	06.10.1990	Letzigrund	1 – 2		25.07.1990	Hardturm	1 – 2	
1991–92	Nationalliga A	26.10.1991	Letzigrund	1 – 1		17.08.1991	Hardturm	3 – 1	
1991–92	Championship Group	03.03.1992	Letzigrund	0 – 2		16.04.1992	Hardturm	3 – 0	
1992–93	Nationalliga A	11.08.1992	Letzigrund	0 – 0		31.10.1992	Hardturm	3 – 1	
1993–94	Nationalliga A	12.12.1993	Letzigrund	0 – 1		25.09.1993	Hardturm	2 – 0	
1994–95	Nationalliga A	22.10.1994	Letzigrund	0 – 3		13.08.1994	Hardturm	2 – 1	
1995–96	Nationalliga A	02.08.1995	Letzigrund	1 – 4		22.10.1995	Hardturm	2 – 0	
1996–97	Nationalliga A	13.10.1996	Letzigrund	2 – 4		14.07.1996	Hardturm	0 – 1	
1996–97	Championship Group	26.03.1997	Letzigrund	0 – 2		15.05.1997	Hardturm	1 – 1	
1997–98	Nationalliga A	20.09.1997	Letzigrund	1 – 2		07.12.1997	Hardturm	3 – 1	
1997–98	Championship Group	15.03.1998	Letzigrund	0 – 2		08.05.1998	Hardturm	2 – 1	
1998–99	Nationalliga A	16.08.1998	Letzigrund	0 – 0		08.11.1998	Letzigrund	1 – 2	
1998–99	Championship Group	13.03.1999	Letzigrund	0 – 1		24.05.1999	Hardturm	0 – 2	
1999–2000	Nationalliga A	11.07.1999	Letzigrund	0 – 0		25.09.1999	Hardturm	2 – 1	
2000–01	Nationalliga A	18.09.2000	Letzigrund	1 – 1		25.09.2000	Hardturm	2 – 3	
2000–01	Championship Group	18.03.2001	Letzigrund	0 – 1		11.05.2001	Hardturm	4 – 2	
2001–02	Nationalliga A	25.08.2001	Letzigrund	1 – 3		25.11.2001	Hardturm	0 – 0	
2001–02	Championship Group	25.04.2002	Letzigrund	1 – 1		09.03.2002	Hardturm	3 – 0	
2002–03	Nationalliga A	10.07.2002	Letzigrund	1 – 2		22.09.2002	Hardturm	1 – 1	
2002–03	Championship Group	21.05.2003	Letzigrund	1 – 1		16.03.2003	Hardturm	2 – 0	
2003–04	Super League	29.10.2003	Letzigrund	0 – 2		17.08.2003	Hardturm	1 – 0	
2003–04	Super League	02.05.2004	Letzigrund	0 – 0		14.03.2004	Hardturm	1 – 2	
2004–05	Super League	26.09.2004	Letzigrund	2 – 0		17.07.2004	Hardturm	1 – 1	
2004–05	Super League	10.04.2005	Letzigrund	1 – 1		17.04.2005	Hardturm	1 – 1	
2005–06	Super League	24.07.2005	Letzigrund	4 – 2		02.10.2005	Hardturm	1 – 0	
2005–06	Super League	30.04.2006	Letzigrund	2 – 0		29.03.2006	Hardturm	0 – 0	
2006–07	Super League	19.08.2006	Hardturm	2 – 1	14,500	18.11.2006	Hardturm	0 – 1	17,666
2006–07	Super League	24.05.2007	Hardturm	2 – 0	18,137	10.02.2007	Hardturm	0 – 0	14,900
2007–08	Super League	23.09.2007	Letzigrund	4 – 0	25,200	09.12.2007	Letzigrund	2 – 1	14,300
2007–08	Super League	02.03.2008	Letzigrund	1 – 0	14,400	20.04.2008	Letzigrund	1 – 1	14,300
2008–09	Super League	09.11.2008	Letzigrund	2 – 1	18,300	10.08.2008	Letzigrund	2 – 2	15,900
2008–09	Super League	29.05.2009	Letzigrund	2 – 1	22,500	08.02.2009	Letzigrund	2 – 2	12,949
2009–10	Super League	12.09.2009	Letzigrund	4 – 3	14,800	05.12.2009	Letzigrund	1 – 0	12,200
2009–10	Super League	05.04.2010	Letzigrund	3 – 2	18,200	15.05.2011	Letzigrund	4 – 0	12,200
2010–11	Super League	25.07.2010	Letzigrund	2 – 0	15,800	03.10.2010	Letzigrund	1 – 2	15,200
2010–11	Super League	10.04.2011	Letzigrund	1 – 0	18,600	15.05.2011	Letzigrund	3 – 1	18,200
2011–12	Super League	07.08.2011	Letzigrund	6 – 0	16,800	02.10.2011	Letzigrund	3 – 0 (Note: Forfait loss.)	
2011–12	Super League	12.02.2012	Letzigrund	2 – 0	6,000	20.05.2011	Letzigrund	0 – 1	11,200
2012–13	Super League	22.09.2012	Letzigrund	0 – 1	17,358	02.12.2012	Letzigrund	1 – 0	18,400
2012–13	Super League	06.04.2013	Letzigrund	2 – 4	16,111	12.05.2013	Letzigrund	0 – 1	14,700
2013–14	Super League	15.12.2013	Letzigrund	1 – 1	12,479	30.10.2013	Letzigrund	3 – 1	13,600
2013–14	Super League	01.03.2014	Letzigrund	3 – 1	14,243	05.04.2014	Letzigrund	2 – 0	16,900
2014–15	Super League	20.07.2014	Letzigrund	1 – 0	13,683	19.10.2014	Letzigrund	1 – 3	19,200
2014–15	Super League	29.05.2015	Letzigrund	4 – 3	11,967	21.02.2015	Letzigrund	0 – 2	9,400
2015–16	Super League	02.08.2015	Letzigrund	2 – 3	11,153	29.11.2015	Letzigrund	5 – 0	14,000
2015–16	Super League	19.04.2016	Letzigrund	1 – 1	10,218	13.03.2016	Letzigrund	4 – 2	14,400
2017–18	Super League	21.10.2017	Letzigrund	0 – 4	17,783	23.07.2017	Letzigrund	0 – 2	20,000
2017–18	Super League	07.04.2018	Letzigrund	1 – 1	14,196	25.02.2018	Letzigrund	1 – 0	12,300
2018–19	Super League	02.12.2018	Letzigrund	2 – 0	14,101	28.07.2018	Letzigrund	0 – 2	16,400
2018–19	Super League	08.02.2019	Letzigrund	3 – 1	11,013	05.04.2019	Letzigrund	1 – 1	12,700
2021–22	Super League	21.08.2021	Letzigrund	2 – 1	14,896	23.10.2021	Letzigrund	3 – 3	15,700
2021–22	Super League	02.04.2022	Letzigrund	1 – 1	15,327	05.02.2022	Letzigrund	1 – 3	16,112
2022–23	Super League	23.10.2022	Letzigrund	1 – 4	15,496	01.10.2022	Letzigrund	1 – 1	16,974
2022–23	Super League	21.05.2023	Letzigrund	2 – 1	16,185	19.02.2023	Letzigrund	1 – 2	21,196
2023–24	Super League	26.09.2023	Letzigrund	2 – 1	17,653	28.01.2024	Letzigrund	2 – 1	19,326
2023–24	Super League	10.02.2024	Letzigrund	1 – 0	18,523	—			
2024–25	Super League	30.11.2024	Letzigrund	1 – 1	18,573	19.10.2024	Letzigrund	1 – 2	19,223
2024–25	Super League	10.05.2025	Letzigrund	3 – 0	17,797	30.03.2025	Letzigrund	1 – 2	21,497
2025–26	Super League	29.11.2025	Letzigrund	1 – 0	17,181	04.10.2025	Letzigrund	3 – 0	17,329
2025–26	Super League	09.05.2026	Letzigrund	2 – 1	18,040	21.02.2026	Letzigrund	1 – 2	14,372

=== Cup Meetings (since 1990) ===
Competition	Round	Date	Home team	Result	Away team
1993–94 Swiss Cup	Semi-finals	4 April 1994	FC Zürich	1 – 2	Grasshopper
2003–04 Swiss Cup	Semi-finals	3 March 2004	Grasshopper	6 – 5 (a.e.t)	FC Zürich
2012–13 Swiss Cup	Semi-finals	17 April 2013	FC Zürich	1 – 2 (a.e.t)	Grasshopper
2014–15 Swiss Cup	Quarter-finals	4 March 2015	FC Zürich	1 – 0 (a.e.t)	Grasshopper
2017–18 Swiss Cup	Semi-finals	28 February 2018	FC Zürich	2 – 1	Grasshopper
2024–25 Swiss Cup	Round of 16	3 December 2024	Grasshopper	0 – 1	FC Zürich

== Fan Misbehavior ==
In the past years, hooliganism has become a big issue for Swiss football. Incidents such as the Disgrace of Basel in 2006 were becoming more common. The Zurich derby is not immune to this phenomenon: In a match on 2 October 2011, the situation hit an all-time low. GC Fans had stolen a banner of FCZ fanclub "Boys" and later displayed the defaced flag during the match as provocation. As a result, FCZ fans snuck into the GC fan sector and threw flares at GC fans. In the 70th minute, at a score of 2–1 for Grasshoppers, referee Sasha Kever put a stop to the match when he saw rioting fans cross the barriers and enter the pitch. Dozens were arrested and 6 were injured in the riots. This day was known in Switzerland as "Die Schande von Zürich" (translated "The Disgrace or Zurich"). In the aftermath, Grasshopper were awarded a 3–0 victory.

On 23 October 2021, after a 3–3 result, FCZ fans threw fireworks into the GC fan sector. Both teams were fined 20,000 Swiss francs, as GC were the home team and responsible for security. Furthermore, FCZ fan sectors are closed for their next two home games.

FCZ fans also disrupted a celebration by GC fans outside Letzigrund following GC's Challenge League victory and promotion, on 20 May 2021. Eleven people were arrested as a result.

== Honours ==
FC Zürich	Competition	Grasshopper
13	Swiss Super League	27
10	Swiss Cup	19
1	Swiss League Cup (defunct)	2
0	Swiss Super Cup (defunct)	1
23	Total	49
