= Stanley Cup riot =

Stanley Cup riot may refer to four riots occurring after the Stanley Cup Final (two of which have occurred in Montreal and another two in Vancouver):

== Stanley Cup finals riot ==
- 1986 riot in Montreal
- 1993 riot in Montreal
- 1994 riot in Vancouver
- 2011 riot in Vancouver

== Stanley Cup playoffs riot ==
- 2006 riot in Edmonton; see sports riot
- 2008 riot in Montreal; see sports riot
- 2010 riot in Montreal; see sports riot

== See also ==
- Stanley Cup (disambiguation)
- sports riot
