= 2011 Zurich hooligan incident =

Football hooligan incident in Zurich, Switzerland

On 2 October 2011, the Swiss Football League game between FC Zürich and Grasshopper Club Zürich (known as the Zürich derby) at Letzigrund Stadium saw an incident of football hooliganism. The game had to be abandoned with approximately 15 minutes of regular time to go. Also dubbed the "Disgrace of Zürich" (German: Skandal/Schande von Zürich) by Swiss media, this incident represented a second major episode of hooligan violence in Switzerland within five years, after a hooligan incident of similar significance occurred in Basel in 2006.

== Incident ==
During the 74th minute of the match, with Grasshopper Club Zürich leading 2-1, a masked FC Zürich fan threw a lit flare into the Grasshopper Club Zürich fan sector. No one was seriously injured at this stage. However, the incident incited a violent reaction from the Grasshopper Club Zürich fans. Several dozen masked Grasshopper Club Zürich fans rushed towards the fence separating the two groups and attempted to fight back with flagpoles. The referee was forced to abandon the match due to safety concerns. Six people were injured in the riot that ensued.

FC Zürich was forced to forfeit the match with a 0-3 score and play their next derby match without any spectators. Both teams were also fined 50,000 Swiss Francs.

Cause of the incident

The FC Zürich fan's actions were reportedly a retaliation for an earlier provocation by Grasshopper Club Zürich fans. Earlier in the day, Grasshopper Club Zürich fans stole FC Zürich fan banners and displayed them with a message mocking FC Zürich. This act is considered a serious offense in ultra fan culture.

== Aftermath ==
The incident raised questions about how Switzerland deals with hooligan violence at matches with calls for enhanced security at Letzigrund Stadium. In its aftermath, several experts contrasted Switzerland's failure to deal with the problem, with England's ability to gain the upper hand in its struggle against hooliganism in the 1990s. The incident also made the news in Germany, with football commentary portal kicker.de featuring a story headlined "The Disgrace of Zurich shocks Switzerland". In 2014, Reuters called it Switzerland's "most serious incident".

The FC Zürich fan who threw the flare was eventually identified and sentenced to a 13-month suspended prison sentence and a 500 Swiss Franc fine. His initial sentence was a two-year suspended prison term, which he successfully appealed to the Swiss Supreme Court. Switzerland's highest court cancelled his two-year sentence and remanded the case back to the Zurich High Court which then gave him a lower sentence.
