= 1990 Detroit riot =

Sports-related riot in Detroit, Michigan

- Date: June 14–15, 1990
- Location: Detroit, Michigan and surrounding areas
- Caused by: Detroit Pistons winning 1990 NBA Finals (4-1)
- Methods: rioting, looting, shooting, assault, hit and run

Casualties
- Deaths: 8
- Injuries: 124
- Arrested: 170

The 1990 Detroit riot occurred on June 14, 1990, after the Detroit Pistons defeated the Portland Trail Blazers in the 1990 NBA Finals. The rioting resulted in 8 deaths and is one of the worst sports-related riots in American history.

== The riot ==
On June 14, 1990, the Detroit Pistons defeated the Portland Trail Blazers 92–90 in Game 5 of the 1990 NBA Finals. The game was played at the Memorial Coliseum in Portland, but over 21,000 Pistons fans watched the game on big screen TVs at The Palace of Auburn Hills, the Pistons' home court. The event at The Palace remained peaceful, with only one arrest occurring.

The game ended at 11:30 pm EDT and rioting quickly began afterward. Looting was reported throughout the city and at least 124 people were hospitalized for injuries, including 26 who had been shot, two had been stabbed, and over a dozen who were beaten in front of riot police. Eight people were killed as well – 10-year-old Keith Brown, 9-year-old Frederick Moore, 15-year-old Alisha Stanfield, and 21-year-old Sonny Deon Hogan were killed after being struck by a Ford Thunderbird in front of a convenience store where they were celebrating. 41-year-old Bruce Burdett Thomas of Warren was charged with four counts of second-degree murder in connection with the incident. Several witnesses described the crash as deliberate. 19-year-old Michael Wilkins was shot and killed after an argument occurred in a parking lot, a 21-year-old man fell off a roof to his death, and two other pedestrians, one of them a 4-year-old boy, were killed in other auto accidents. A total of 141 people were arrested in Detroit.

The rioting spread to suburban areas. In River Rouge, 28 youths were arrested after they smashed the windows of several stores and a police car. In Roseville, a police car was pelted with beer cans and bottles, though no one was arrested.

The Pistons had won the 1989 NBA Finals and little violence occurred, though violence occurred after the Detroit Tigers won the 1984 World Series. The rioting was the worst the city had experienced since the 1967 riot.

== See also ==
- Chicago Bulls championship riots
