= Stanley Cup (disambiguation) =

The Stanley Cup is an ice hockey championship trophy.

Stanley Cup may also refer to:

== Ice hockey ==
- NHL Stanley Cup (Super NES), an ice hockey video game
- Stanley Cup challenge games, the competition format of the Stanley Cup used from 1893 to 1914
- Stanley Cup Final, the championship series to determine the winner of the Stanley Cup
- Stanley Cup playoffs, the elimination tournament in which the trophy is contested

== Insulated container ==
- Stanley bottle, a type of insulated bottle also known as a Stanley cup

== Other uses ==
- "Stanley's Cup", an episode of South Park
- Sir Arthur Stanley Cup, presented at the first British Grand Prix in 1926

== See also ==
- Stanley Cup winner in ice hockey
  - Stanley Cup ring
  - List of Stanley Cup champions
- Stanley Cup riot (disambiguation)
