= Chicago Bulls championship riots =

1990s sports riots in the United States

Mass rioting and looting occurred in Chicago, Illinois in the immediate aftermath of the Chicago Bulls winning six NBA championships in the 1990s.

== Background ==
During the 1990s, the Chicago Bulls, led by Michael Jordan, won six NBA Championships in two three-peats from 1991 to 1993 and 1996–98.

== 1991 ==
On June 12, 1991, the Bulls defeated the Los Angeles Lakers four games to one in the 1991 NBA Finals. After the victory, scattered incidents of looting and shootings occurred throughout Chicago, with two teenagers being injured by stray bullets at a victory rally. 115 people were arrested.

== 1992 ==
The most serious and widespread championship rioting occurred on June 14, 1992, after the Bulls defeated the Portland Trail Blazers in the 1992 NBA Finals. Rioting occurred throughout city, starting with people pouring out of bars on Division Street and destroying two taxicabs and dancing in the streets. The most serious violence occurred in the impoverished neighborhoods on the city's South and West Sides. Over 200 civilians and 95 police officers were injured, 61 police vehicles were damaged, over 1,000 arrests made and 347 stores were looted, mostly along Madison Street. No one was killed during the rioting, but a liquor store clerk was severely burnt when looters set fire to the store.

=== Racial aspects ===
The Los Angeles riots occurred just over a month prior to the Championship riot, resulting in 63 deaths. The riots sparked unrest elsewhere in the country, such as Las Vegas, but Chicago avoided major demonstrations in the immediate aftermath.

After the mass looting that occurred in Chicago's predominantly black South and West side ghettos, newspaper speculated if Korean-owned stores were specifically targeted by black looters, as had been the case in Los Angeles. However, this was not the case as stores owned by all races of people were looted indiscriminately.

98% of people arrested for felony burglary during the riot were black, while only 69% of those arrested for burglary in 1992 in Chicago were black. Additionally, there was a heavy police presence in Chicago's downtown area, where mostly non-black fans celebrated, but not as many arrests.

== 1993 ==
The Bulls defeated the Phoenix Suns on June 20, 1993, securing their third consecutive championship. Gunfire and looting began almost instantly after the victory, mostly concentrated along State Street on the city's south side, with gang members randomly firing guns into the air in celebration. 682 people were arrested, dozens of stores were looted and several police officers were wounded by projectiles and gunfire.

While looting was not as widespread as it was during 1992, several people were killed during the 1993 riot. A fifteen-year-old boy was shot and killed at the Theodore K. Lawless Gardens Apartments minutes after the Bulls won the championship. Twelve-year old Michael Lowery was struck by a stray bullet while sitting in front of his house and later died. 26-year-old Rosalind Slaughter was also killed by a stray bullet. 25-year-old Henry McFadden was shot to death after stepping outside his home and eighteen-year-old Julio Castillo the passenger of a vehicle attacked by a mob was shot to death at an intersection where several other motorists were assaulted. The murders of Lowery and Slaughter were never solved.

== 1996 ==
38 stores were looted or broken into and 650 people were arrested after the Bulls defeated the Seattle SuperSonics to win the 1996 NBA championship on June 16, 1996. The city of Chicago had spent over $3 million in preparation for violence if the Bulls won. Despite the preparations, a teenager was stomped to death for wearing a Los Angeles Lakers jacket. He had been attacked so severely that the Swoosh logo from a Nike shoe was imprinted on his forehead.

== 1997 ==
Prior to the Bulls winning the 1997 NBA Finals, Chicago mayor Richard M. Daley ordered 6,000 police officers and 200 to 300 National Guardsmen on the streets in preparation for possible violence if the Bulls won. When the Bulls did defeat the Utah Jazz on June 13, 1997, several stores were looted and three people died, including a 32-year-old man who was killed by stray gunfire after another man fired shots at teenagers who had thrown rocks at his truck.

No violence occurred after the Bulls defeated the Jazz again in the 1998 Finals.

== See also ==
- 1990 Detroit riot
