= 1990 NBA Finals =

1990 basketball championship series

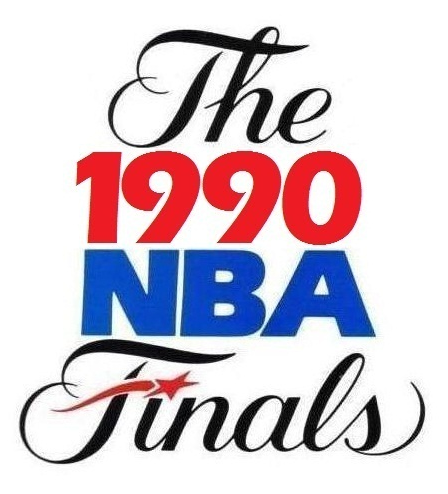
Team	Coach	Wins
Detroit Pistons	Chuck Daly	4
Portland Trail Blazers	Rick Adelman	1
- Dates: June 5–14
- MVP: Isiah Thomas (Detroit Pistons)
- Hall of Famers: Trail Blazers: Clyde Drexler (2004); Dražen Petrović (2002); Pistons: Joe Dumars (2006); Dennis Rodman (2011); Isiah Thomas (2000); Coaches: Rick Adelman (2021); Chuck Daly (1994); Officials: Dick Bavetta (2015); Hugh Evans (2022); Darell Garretson (2016); Earl Strom (1995)
- Eastern finals: Pistons defeated Bulls, 4–3
- Western finals: Trail Blazers defeated Suns, 4–2

The 1990 NBA Finals was the championship series of the National Basketball Association's (NBA) 1989–90 season, and the conclusion of the season's playoffs. The series pitted the defending NBA champion and Eastern Conference champion Detroit Pistons against the Western Conference champion Portland Trail Blazers. The Pistons defeated the Trail Blazers in five games to repeat as NBA champions.

This was the first NBA Finals since 1979 — and the only one between 1979 and 1992 — that did not feature either the Los Angeles Lakers or the Boston Celtics, and one of two NBA championships of the 1990s (the other was won by the San Antonio Spurs in 1999) won by a team other than the Chicago Bulls (6 wins) or the Houston Rockets (2 wins).

The Pistons became just the third franchise in NBA history to win back-to-back championships, after the Lakers (first accomplished in 1949, 1950) and Celtics (first accomplished in 1959, 1960).

== Background ==
=== Portland Trail Blazers ===
The Trail Blazers last made the NBA Finals when they won the NBA championship in 1977. In between finals appearances, the Blazers made the playoffs every year except 1982, but most of the time were eliminated in the first or second round. Along the way, Portland built a core that would turn the team into title contenders, adding Clyde Drexler, Terry Porter and Jerome Kersey through the draft while signing or trading for players such as Buck Williams and Kevin Duckworth. The addition of Williams cost Portland once-promising center Sam Bowie, whose career had been curtailed by a series of leg injuries after being drafted second overall in the 1984 NBA draft. Early in the 1988–89 season, the Blazers fired head coach Mike Schuler and replaced him with assistant Rick Adelman, who would go on to win over 1,000 regular season games in 23 NBA seasons.

Entering the 1989–90 season with modest expectations, the Trail Blazers surprised the NBA by posting a 59–23 record, good enough for the third seed in the Western Conference. In the playoffs, they swept the Dallas Mavericks in the first round, defeated the San Antonio Spurs in seven games during the second round, and eliminated the Phoenix Suns in six games in the conference finals.

=== Detroit Pistons ===
The Pistons won their first NBA championship a year earlier. However, they entered the 1989–90 season without rugged forward Rick Mahorn, who had been selected by the Minnesota Timberwolves in the 1989 NBA expansion draft and was later traded to the Philadelphia 76ers.

Despite the loss of Mahorn, the Pistons still managed to post a 59–23 record to lead the Eastern Conference. With Mahorn gone, Defensive Player of the Year winner Dennis Rodman picked up the slack, keeping the Pistons in true "Bad Boys" form all season. On their way to the Finals, Detroit swept the Indiana Pacers in the first round, defeated the New York Knicks in five games during the second round, and overcame their archrival Chicago Bulls in seven games in the conference finals.

=== Road to the Finals ===
Portland Trail Blazers (Western Conference champion)		Detroit Pistons (Eastern Conference champion)
# / Western Conference; # / Team / W / L / PCT / GB; 1 / z-Los Angeles Lakers / 63 / 19 / .768 / –; 2 / y-San Antonio Spurs / 56 / 26 / .683 / 7; 3 / x-Portland Trail Blazers / 59 / 23 / .720 / 4; 4 / x-Utah Jazz / 55 / 27 / .671 / 8; 5 / x-Phoenix Suns / 54 / 28 / .659 / 9; 6 / x-Dallas Mavericks / 47 / 35 / .573 / 16; 7 / x-Denver Nuggets / 43 / 39 / .524 / 20; 8 / x-Houston Rockets / 41 / 41 / .500 / 22; 9 / Seattle SuperSonics / 41 / 41 / .500 / 22; 10 / Golden State Warriors / 37 / 45 / .451 / 26; 11 / Los Angeles Clippers / 30 / 52 / .366 / 33; 12 / Sacramento Kings / 23 / 59 / .280 / 40; 13 / Minnesota Timberwolves / 22 / 60 / .268 / 41; 14 / Charlotte Hornets / 19 / 63 / .232 / 44; 3rd seed in the West, 3rd best league record	Regular season	# / Eastern Conference; # / Team / W / L / PCT / GB; 1 / c-Detroit Pistons / 59 / 23 / .720 / –; 2 / y-Philadelphia 76ers / 53 / 29 / .646 / 6; 3 / x-Chicago Bulls / 55 / 27 / .671 / 4; 4 / x-Boston Celtics / 52 / 30 / .634 / 7; 5 / x-New York Knicks / 45 / 37 / .549 / 14; 6 / x-Milwaukee Bucks / 44 / 38 / .537 / 15; 7 / x-Cleveland Cavaliers / 42 / 40 / .512 / 17; 8 / x-Indiana Pacers / 42 / 40 / .512 / 17; 9 / Atlanta Hawks / 41 / 41 / .500 / 18; 10 / Washington Bullets / 31 / 51 / .378 / 28; 11 / Miami Heat / 18 / 64 / .220 / 41; 12 / Orlando Magic / 18 / 64 / .220 / 41; 13 / New Jersey Nets / 17 / 65 / .207 / 42; 1st seed in the East, 2nd best league record
Defeated (6) Dallas Mavericks, 3–0	First round	Defeated (8) Indiana Pacers, 3–0
Defeated the (2) San Antonio Spurs, 4–3	Conference semifinals	Defeated (5) New York Knicks, 4–1
Defeated the (5) Phoenix Suns, 4–2	Conference finals	Defeated (3) Chicago Bulls, 4–3

=== Regular season series ===
Both teams split the two meetings, each won by the home team:

November 26, 1989

Detroit Pistons 82, Portland Trail Blazers 102

Memorial Coliseum, Portland, Oregon

January 13, 1990

Portland Trail Blazers 106, Detroit Pistons 111

The Palace of Auburn Hills, Auburn Hills, Michigan

== Team rosters ==
=== Detroit Pistons ===
1989–90 Detroit Pistons roster
Players

Pos.	No.	Player	Height	Weight	DOB	From
SF	23	Mark Aguirre	6 ft 6 in (1.98 m)	232 lb (105 kg)	1959–12–10	DePaul
C	20	William Bedford	7 ft 0 in (2.13 m)	225 lb (102 kg)	1963–12–14	Memphis
SG	4	Joe Dumars	6 ft 3 in (1.91 m)	190 lb (86 kg)	1963–05–24	McNeese State
C	53	James Edwards	7 ft 0 in (2.13 m)	225 lb (102 kg)	1955–11–22	Washington
PF	33	Dave Greenwood	6 ft 9 in (2.06 m)	222 lb (101 kg)	1957–05–27	UCLA
PF	35	Scott Hastings	6 ft 10 in (2.08 m)	235 lb (107 kg)	1960–06–03	Arkansas
PG	12	Gerald Henderson	6 ft 2 in (1.88 m)	175 lb (79 kg)	1956–01–16	VCU
PG	15	Vinnie Johnson	6 ft 2 in (1.88 m)	200 lb (91 kg)	1956–09–01	Baylor
C	40	Bill Laimbeer	6 ft 11 in (2.11 m)	245 lb (111 kg)	1957–05–19	Notre Dame
SF	10	Dennis Rodman	6 ft 8 in (2.03 m)	210 lb (95 kg)	1961–05–13	SE Oklahoma State
PF	22	John Salley	6 ft 11 in (2.11 m)	230 lb (104 kg)	1964–05–16	Georgia Tech
PG	11	Isiah Thomas	6 ft 1 in (1.85 m)	180 lb (82 kg)	1961–04–30	Indiana

Coaches
Head coach
- Chuck Daly
Assistant(s)
- Brendan Malone
- Brendan Suhr

Legend
- (DP) Unsigned draft pick
- (FA) Free agent
- (S) Suspended
- Injured

=== Portland Trail Blazers ===
1989–90 Portland Trail Blazers roster
Players

Pos.	No.	Player	Height	Weight	DOB	From
F/C	2	Mark Bryant	6 ft 9 in (2.06 m)	245 lb (111 kg)	1965–04–25	Seton Hall
F/C	42	Wayne Cooper	6 ft 10 in (2.08 m)	220 lb (100 kg)	1956–11–16	LSU New Orleans
G	22	Clyde Drexler	6 ft 7 in (2.01 m)	210 lb (95 kg)	1962–06–22	Houston
C	00	Kevin Duckworth	7 ft 0 in (2.13 m)	275 lb (125 kg)	1964–04–01	Eastern Illinois
G	23	Byron Irvin	6 ft 5 in (1.96 m)	190 lb (86 kg)	1966–12–02	Missouri
F	33	Nate Johnston	6 ft 8 in (2.03 m)	210 lb (95 kg)	1966–12–18	Tampa
F	25	Jerome Kersey	6 ft 7 in (2.01 m)	215 lb (98 kg)	1962–06–26	Longwood
G	44	Dražen Petrović	6 ft 5 in (1.96 m)	195 lb (88 kg)	1964–10–22	SFR Yugoslavia
G	30	Terry Porter	6 ft 3 in (1.91 m)	195 lb (88 kg)	1963–04–08	UW–Stevens Point
F	50	Robert Reid	6 ft 8 in (2.03 m)	205 lb (93 kg)	1955–08–30	Saint Mary's
F	3	Clifford Robinson	6 ft 10 in (2.08 m)	225 lb (102 kg)	1966–12–16	Connecticut
F/C	52	Buck Williams	6 ft 8 in (2.03 m)	215 lb (98 kg)	1960–03–08	Maryland
G	21	Danny Young	6 ft 3 in (1.91 m)	175 lb (79 kg)	1962–07–26	Wake Forest

Coaches
Head coach
- Rick Adelman
Assistant(s)
- Jack Schalow
- John Wetzel

Legend
- (DP) Unsigned draft pick
- (FA) Free agent
- (S) Suspended
- Injured

== Series summary ==
Game	Date	Road team	Result	Home team
Game 1	June 5	Portland Trail Blazers	99–105 (0–1)	Detroit Pistons
Game 2	June 7	Portland Trail Blazers	106–105 (OT) (1–1)	Detroit Pistons
Game 3	June 10	Detroit Pistons	121–106 (2–1)	Portland Trail Blazers
Game 4	June 12	Detroit Pistons	112–109 (3–1)	Portland Trail Blazers
Game 5	June 14	Detroit Pistons	92–90 (4–1)	Portland Trail Blazers

The Pistons became the first team in Finals history to win Games 3 through 5 in the 2–3–2 series format which was used between 1985 and 2013.

This would be the last series to be played on a Tuesday–Thursday–Sunday rotation until the 2004 series. (Which was, coincidentally, also won by Detroit in 5 games.) From 1991 to 2003, the series were primarily on Wednesday–Friday–Sunday. Game three is the most recent NBA Finals game to tip off earlier than 8:30 p.m. Eastern/5:30 p.m. Pacific time.

=== Game 1 ===
CBS

June 5
9:00 pm EDT

Portland Trail Blazers 99, Detroit Pistons 105
Scoring by quarter: 33–24, 19–23, 28–29, 19–29
Pts: Clyde Drexler 21; Rebs: Buck Williams 12; Asts: Terry Porter 8	Pts: Isiah Thomas 33; Rebs: Bill Laimbeer 15; Asts: Isiah Thomas 6
Detroit leads the series, 1–0

The Palace of Auburn Hills, Auburn Hills, Michigan
Attendance: 21,454
Referees:
- No. 25 Hugh Evans
- No. 4 Ed T. Rush
- No. 27 Dick Bavetta

The Blazers led 90–80 with seven minutes left and looked poised to steal one on the road. But, after a timeout, Isiah Thomas got the Pistons going with a layup and a jumper. Then Joe Dumars completed a three-point play and Aguirre scored on an offensive rebound. In less than three minutes, Detroit had tightened the game to 92–89.

Buck Williams hit a jumper to make the score 94–89, but then Thomas scored seven straight points on two free throws, a three-point shot, and an 18-footer to give the Pistons their first lead. With 1:49 left, Thomas put a final dagger into the Blazers by sticking an open three-pointer for a 99–94 lead. The Pistons went on to win, 105–99.

This was the first Finals assignment for referee Dick Bavetta, who had been an NBA official since the 1975-76 season. He would go on to set the league record for most games officiated and was inducted into the Naismith Basketball Hall of Fame in 2015.

A little under a month after the release of her debut single Vision of Love, future best selling recording artist Mariah Carey performed a heavily acclaimed rendition of "America the Beautiful".

=== Game 2 ===
CBS

June 7
9:00 pm EDT

Portland Trail Blazers 106, Detroit Pistons 105 (OT)
Scoring by quarter: 23–30, 30–15, 22–24, 19–25, Overtime: 12–11
Pts: Clyde Drexler 33; Rebs: Buck Williams 12; Asts: Terry Porter 10	Pts: Edwards, Laimbeer 26; Rebs: Bill Laimbeer 11; Asts: Isiah Thomas 11
Series tied, 1–1

The Palace of Auburn Hills, Auburn Hills, Michigan
Attendance: 21,454
Referees:
- No. 10 Darell Garretson
- No. 14 Jack Madden
- No. 42 Hue Hollins

The Blazers, playing surprisingly well on the road, had control of the game past the third quarter. Behind Bill Laimbeer, however, the Pistons made a comeback in the fourth period. Laimbeer, who had scored only seven points over the first three periods, went wild in the fourth and overtime, making 19 points over the last 17 minutes. For the game, he successfully converted six three-pointers, tying a Finals record set by the Lakers' Michael Cooper in 1987.

The Pistons had a 94–91 lead with 49 seconds left after a John Salley tip-in. Five seconds later, Clyde Drexler, who would finish with 33 points, made a free throw. With 23 seconds left, Isiah Thomas missed a potential game-clinching layup. Terry Porter tied the game at 94 with a pair of free throws with 10 seconds left, and the game went to overtime when Thomas missed an 18-footer at the buzzer.

A hook shot by James Edwards and two three-pointers by Laimbeer gave the Pistons a 102–98 lead with 1:30 left in overtime. Porter hit another set of free throws to trim the lead to two; then Drexler tied it at the one-minute mark with a 17-footer.

Portland took the lead at 104–102 when Thomas fouled out with 1:10 left. Laimbeer promptly bailed the Pistons out with 4.1 seconds remaining by hitting a 25-foot three-pointer for a 105–104 lead.

Portland gave the ball to Drexler, who was fouled by Dennis Rodman, playing on a sore ankle, with two seconds left. Drexler made both foul shots to give the Blazers the 106–105 lead. The Pistons quickly passed the ball to Edwards, who tried a shot from the left of the paint, but rookie Clifford Robinson blocked it at the last second. With that, the Blazers won the game and took away the home-court advantage.

Game 2 of the 1990 Finals marked the first time in six years that a Finals game went into overtime, the last being Game 4 of the 1984 NBA Finals.

The Pistons lose their first playoff game in the Palace at Auburn Hills, snapping their 14-game winning streak.

=== Game 3 ===
CBS

June 10
3:30 pm EDT

Detroit Pistons 121, Portland Trail Blazers 106
Scoring by quarter: 31–27, 27–24, 32–31, 31–24
Pts: Joe Dumars 33; Rebs: Bill Laimbeer 12; Asts: Isiah Thomas 8	Pts: Jerome Kersey 27; Rebs: Clyde Drexler 13; Asts: Terry Porter 9
Detroit leads the series, 2–1

Memorial Coliseum, Portland, Oregon
Attendance: 12,884
Referees:
- No. 11 Jake O'Donnell
- No. 20 Jess Kersey
- No. 17 Joe Crawford

Joe Dumars' father, Joe Dumars II, died of congestive heart failure 1 1/2 hours before the tipoff of Game 3. He had had severe diabetes, which resulted in the amputation of both of his legs in 1985. As his father's condition worsened, Dumars realized that the news of his father's death might come before or during an important game. So he asked Debbie, his new wife, not to inform him of any news until after the game had ended. His father had instilled such professionalism in Dumars, and his wife kept his wish.

Two things were stacked against the Pistons. One, they had not won in Portland since October 19, 1974, the second game of Bill Walton's career. Two, they would be without Dennis Rodman, whose ankle had stiffened. But, Vinnie Johnson found his range for the first time, making 9 of 13 shots for 21 points. The consummate professional Dumars was the most potent, however, leading Detroit with 33 points on an array of shots. One such shot was a three-pointer that stifled a Blazer run after they had cut the Piston lead to 68–60 in the third.

Detroit won, 121–106. Dumars' wife then used a courtside phone to inform Joe of his father's death. Dumars decided he would play the next game but declined press interviews.

=== Game 4 ===
CBS

June 12
9:00 pm EDT

Detroit Pistons 112, Portland Trail Blazers 109
Scoring by quarter: 22–32, 29–14, 32–27, 29–36
Pts: Isiah Thomas 32; Rebs: Bill Laimbeer 12; Asts: Isiah Thomas 5	Pts: Clyde Drexler 34; Rebs: Drexler, Kersey 8 each Asts: Clyde Drexler 10
Detroit leads the series, 3–1

Memorial Coliseum, Portland, Oregon
Attendance: 12,642
Referees:
- No. 25 Hugh Evans
- No. 13 Mike Mathis
- No. 12 Earl Strom

The Pistons were plagued with shooting problems as the Blazers raced off to a 32–22 lead at the end of the first period. But Vinnie Johnson and Joe Dumars took over, leading a 9–0 run that pulled the Pistons to 32–31 with 7:49 left in the half. The Pistons led 51–46 at intermission as the suffocating Detroit defense held the Blazers to 14 second-quarter points.

Isiah Thomas scored 22 points in the third and capped his onslaught with a three-pointer at the 2:15 mark that gave the Pistons an 81–65 lead and seemed to quiet the Portland crowd.

But, over the next eight minutes, the Blazers suddenly remembered the pressure defense and running game that had gotten them to the NBA Finals. They went on a 28–11 run of their own, and Terry Porter drove for a layup to give them a 93–92 lead with 5:20 left.

The game became a nip-and-tuck affair until Detroit led 106–102 on a jumper by Dumars at 1:16, but the Blazers fought back and had a chance to tie it with 35 seconds left. Buck Williams missed one of two free throws and Portland trailed 106–105.

Four seconds later, in a scramble under the Pistons' basket, Bill Laimbeer drew his sixth foul, disqualifying him for the remainder of the game. Clyde Drexler made both free throws to give Portland the lead, 107–106, with 31.8 seconds left. But Thomas responded by sinking a 22-footer that returned the edge to Detroit 108–107.

With nine seconds left, Porter attempted to drive on Dumars, but Joe blocked his path. Thomas scooped up the ensuing loose ball and headed the other way. Danny Young quickly fouled him as he let fly a 55-footer that went in. The officials quickly ruled it no good, as the foul occurred before the shot, but Thomas made the free throws for a 110–107 lead with 8.4 seconds showing.

Mark Aguirre then fouled Porter with 6.5 seconds left, and he made both, drawing Portland to 110–109. On the ensuing play, James Edwards got the ball downcourt to a wide-open Gerald Henderson for an easy layup and a 112–109 lead. Portland now had the ball and 1.8 seconds to get a shot.

The Blazers whipped the ball upcourt to Young, who promptly knocked down a 35-footer from the right sideline. Immediately players from both benches came onto the floor, the Blazers believing the game was now tied and the Pistons believing otherwise. Veteran referee Earl Strom, calling his final NBA game, huddled the officials amid the din and signaled that the shot was too late. Videotaped replays later confirmed the accuracy of the call. The Blazers were down, three games to one.

=== Game 5 ===
CBS

June 14
9:00 pm EDT

Detroit Pistons 92, Portland Trail Blazers 90
Scoring by quarter: 26–22, 20–20, 19–27, 27–21
Pts: Isiah Thomas 29; Rebs: Bill Laimbeer 17; Asts: Joe Dumars 7	Pts: Duckworth, Porter 21 each Rebs: Jerome Kersey 9 Asts: Terry Porter 9
Detroit wins the NBA Finals, 4–1

Memorial Coliseum, Portland, Oregon
Attendance: 12,642
Referees:
- No. 10 Darell Garretson
- No. 14 Jack Madden
- No. 4 Ed T. Rush

For much of Game 5 it appeared Portland would at least send the series back to Detroit. The Pistons shot poorly starting out, missing seven of their first 11 shots, but still led 26–22 after one quarter. They held the same four-point edge at the half, 46–42, but the Blazers rallied in the third period, and with 10 minutes to play in the game, they led 76–68.

Vinnie Johnson then went on the first of two scoring streaks. "The Microwave" scored all of Detroit's points in a 9–0 run to give his team a 77–76 edge with 6:35 to go. The Blazers stepped up their pressure and again built a 90–83 lead with 2:05 left. But, when Clyde Drexler fouled out, Portland could not score the rest of the way and "The Microwave" heated up again. Johnson scored seven points in Detroit's astounding 9–0 run to close the game and the series. His last shot was a 15-footer from the right sideline with Jerome Kersey draped all over him and 0:00.7 showing on the clock. Terry Porter had a last chance to force a Game 6, but his three clanked off the rim.

Isiah Thomas was named the Finals MVP. He had scored 33, 23, 21, 32 and 29 points, respectively, in the five games. From three-point range he had made 11 of 16 shots. For the series, he had averaged 27.6 points, 8.0 assists, and 5.2 rebounds, a performance that caused him to unleash his full smile afterward.

"You can say what you want about me," he said, "but you can't say that I'm not a winner."

== Player statistics ==
Legend
GP	Games played	GS	Games started	MPG	Minutes per game
FG%	Field-goal percentage	3P%	3-point field-goal percentage	FT%	Free-throw percentage
RPG	Rebounds per game	APG	Assists per game	SPG	Steals per game
BPG	Blocks per game	PPG	Points per game

Detroit Pistons

Detroit Pistons statistics
Player	GP	GS	MPG	FG%	3P%	FT%	RPG	APG	SPG	BPG	PPG
Mark Aguirre	5	3	24.0	.333	.500	.667	3.6	0.8	0.4	0.0	9.6
Joe Dumars	5	5	42.0	.415	.286	.892	2.8	5.6	0.8	0.0	20.6
James Edwards	5	5	27.6	.446	.000	.560	3.8	0.8	0.4	0.6	14.4
Dave Greenwood	3	0	11.0	.333	.000	.500	3.0	0.0	0.3	0.0	1.0
Scott Hastings	2	0	2.0	.000	.000	.000	0.0	0.0	0.0	0.0	0.0
Gerald Henderson	2	0	1.0	1.000	.000	.000	0.0	0.0	0.0	0.0	1.0
Vinnie Johnson	5	0	22.6	.543	.000	.786	2.0	1.2	0.2	0.6	12.2
Bill Laimbeer	5	5	38.2	.444	.364	1.000	13.4	2.4	1.4	0.6	13.2
Dennis Rodman	4	2	19.8	.444	.000	.250	5.5	0.8	0.5	0.5	2.3
John Salley	5	0	28.6	.375	.000	.692	6.4	0.4	0.2	2.4	6.6
Isiah Thomas	5	5	38.4	.542	.688	.742	5.2	7.0	1.6	0.4	27.6

Portland Trail Blazers

Portland Trail Blazers statistics
Player	GP	GS	MPG	FG%	3P%	FT%	RPG	APG	SPG	BPG	PPG
Mark Bryant	2	0	4.5	.000	.000	.500	1.0	0.0	0.0	0.0	0.5
Wayne Cooper	5	0	14.0	.333	.000	.250	4.0	0.2	0.4	0.8	1.8
Clyde Drexler	5	5	40.8	.543	.167	.757	7.8	6.2	1.8	0.2	26.4
Kevin Duckworth	5	5	29.8	.523	.000	.667	5.6	0.0	0.2	0.4	15.6
Jerome Kersey	5	5	41.2	.473	.000	.781	7.0	1.2	0.6	0.6	19.0
Dražen Petrović	4	0	7.3	.357	.000	.000	0.3	0.5	0.3	0.0	2.5
Terry Porter	5	5	41.2	.393	.280	.889	2.6	8.4	2.0	0.2	19.0
Clifford Robinson	5	0	16.4	.250	.000	.500	2.4	0.8	0.8	0.8	3.8
Buck Williams	5	5	38.4	.465	.000	.640	9.0	1.8	0.6	0.2	11.2
Danny Young	5	0	15.6	.400	.333	.333	1.4	1.6	0.6	0.2	3.0

== Media coverage ==
=== Television ===
CBS Sports handled the Finals for the 17th consecutive and last time, as the new television contract taking effect the following season would see the games move to NBC. Dick Stockton led the commentary team as play-by-play for the 9th straight year, with Hubie Brown serving as analyst for the second consecutive year. Pat O'Brien anchored the network's coverage, working on his 7th and last Finals for CBS and his first as anchor since Brent Musburger was fired in April 1990. James Brown worked from courtside covering both teams.

After CBS' run with the NBA ended, Brown moved to Turner Sports to fill the same role. Stockton would not call another NBA game until 1995, when he also joined Turner. Stockton and Brown would occasionally be paired together on TBS and TNT until 2002, when Brown was hired to coach the Memphis Grizzlies.

=== Radio ===
For the sixth and final time, ABC Radio provided national coverage of the Finals. Fred Manfra was the lead, with Dick Vitale and Earl Monroe as analysts.

WWJ (AM) and KEX (AM) were the local radio broadcasters for the Pistons and the Trail Blazers with George Blaha and Bill Schonely as the lead broadcasters.

== Aftermath ==
The 1990 Detroit riot occurred during the celebrations after Game 5, marking one of the worst sports-related riots in US history.

The Pistons would not make a fourth consecutive Finals visit in 1991. Star Isiah Thomas missed 34 games, but the team went 50–32 and clinched the third seed in the East. The Chicago Bulls, the team the Pistons had beaten in three consecutive playoffs, swept them in the Eastern Conference Finals. With 7.9 seconds left in Game 4, most of the Pistons team (minus John Salley, Vinnie Johnson, and Joe Dumars) left the court so as not to congratulate the Bulls. The Pistons walked off the court without shaking hands with the Bulls, supposedly due to comments by Michael Jordan in a pre-game interview, where he stated that “The Pistons are undeserving champions”, and that “The Bad Boys are bad for basketball.” It was noted by Isiah Thomas that they were following precedent set by most of the Boston Celtics, who had similarly walked off the court without shaking hands with the Pistons in the 1988 Eastern Conference Finals before losing the series in Game 6. Nevertheless, this moment loomed as a dark cloud over Isiah Thomas, who was seen as the leader of the Pistons, although it was later revealed to be Bill Laimbeer’s idea to walk off the court before the game finished. Thomas was left off the 1992 Olympic Men’s Basketball "Dream Team" partly due to a rocky relationship with star player Michael Jordan, with many pointing to this moment, as well as the supposed decision to “freeze-out” Jordan in the 1985 NBA All-Star Game, as the origins of their hard feelings towards each other.

Within a few seasons, the Pistons’ Bad Boys core broke up, with key players, including Thomas, retiring or moving on as free agents to other teams. Dennis Rodman, James Edwards and John Salley would win a championship in 1996 with the Bulls and 2000 Lakers; Rodman won two more in 1997 and 1998. Detroit would return to the Finals in 2004, and upset the Kobe Bryant and Shaquille O'Neal-led Los Angeles Lakers in five games for their most recent championship.

The Trail Blazers returned to the Finals two years later, but lost to the Chicago Bulls in six games, becoming the second victim of the Bulls’ first three-peat from 1991 to 1993. This and the 1995 NBA Finals were the only Finals in the 1990s decade where Michael Jordan did not appear in during a season he played in (Jordan did not play in the 1993–1994 and 1998–1999 NBA seasons).

== See also ==
- 1990 NBA playoffs
