= Kaveh Solhekol =

British sports commentator

- Occupations: Journalist, television presenter
- Television: Sky Sports News

Kaveh Solhekol is an English sports journalist and sport television presenter for Sky Sports.

== Career ==
A native of London, England, Solhekol is a sports journalist for Sky Sports, having previously worked for The Times.

In 2023, Solhekol publicly defended Gary Lineker after the BBC investigated him for perceived biases. He argued that figures such as Andrew Neil and former BBC Chair Richard Sharpe had been allowed to have political involvement while Lineker had not.
