= Letzigrund =

Stadium in Zurich, Switzerland

Stadion Letzigrund
- Letzi
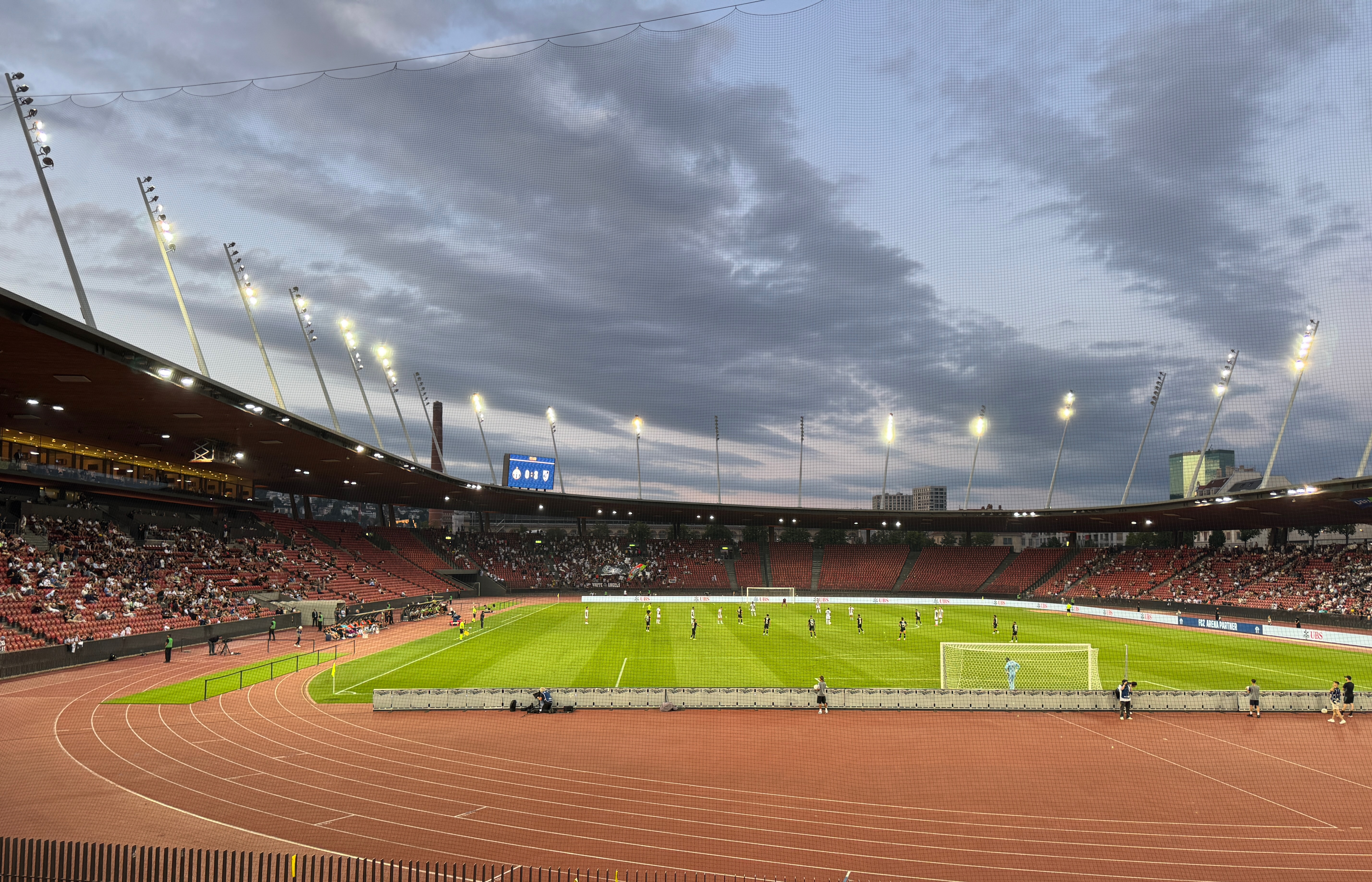
- Letzigrund in 2024
- Interactive map of Stadion Letzigrund
- Location: Zurich, Switzerland
- Owner: City of Zurich
- Operator: City of Zurich
- Capacity: 26,105 (football, domestic league), 24,061 (football, international matches), 30,930 (UEFA Euro 2008), 25,773 (athletics), 50,044 (concerts)
- Field size: 105 x 68 m
- Public transit: Tram lines 2, 3, 4, 13, 14 and 17

Construction
- Groundbreaking: 15 November 2005
- Built: 2006–2007
- Opened: 30 August 2007
- Cost: CHF 120 million (2007)
- Architects: Bétrix & Consolascio, Frei & Ehrensperger
- General contractor: Implenia

Tenants
- FC Zürich; Grasshopper Club Zürich; FC Zürich Frauen; LC Zürich

Letzigrund (Swiss Standard German: [ˈlɛtsiɡrʊnd]) is a stadium in Zurich, Switzerland, the home of the football clubs FC Zürich and Grasshopper Club Zürich, as well as the athletics club LC Zürich. The original stadium was constructed by members of FC Zürich in 1925. Grasshopper Club has been using it as their home stadium since 2007, shortly after construction of the new stadium was completed.

The annual track and field meet Weltklasse Zürich, part of the Diamond League, has taken place at the Letzigrund since 1928, as have frequent open-air concerts. On the Letzigrund track on 21 June 1960, Armin Hary was the first human to run the 100 metres in 10.0 seconds.

== Old stadium (1925–2006) ==
Letzigrund (old stadium)
- Letzi
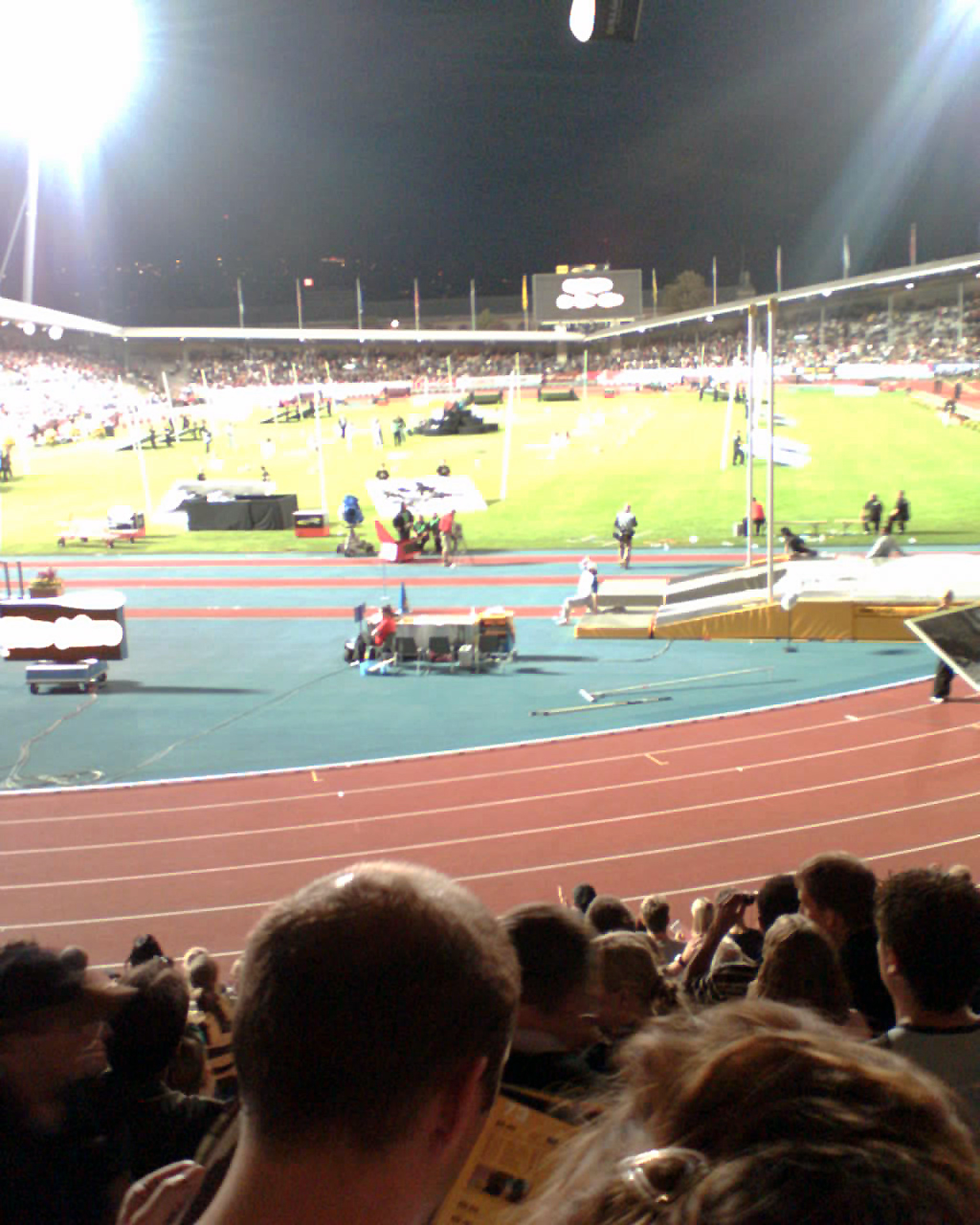
- Interactive map of Letzigrund (old stadium)
- Location: Zürich, Switzerland
- Coordinates: 47°22′58″N 8°30′16″E
- Owner: FC Zürich (1925–1937), City of Zurich (1937–2006)
- Capacity: 25,000 (football); 48,000 (concerts, 2006)

Construction
- Opened: 22 November 1925
- Expanded: 1947, 1958, 1973, 1984
- Closed: 20 August 2006
- Demolished: 2006

Tenants
- FC Zürich, LC Zürich

The old Letzigrund stadium was opened on 22 November 1925 and was owned by FC Zürich. In 1937, during the Great Depression, ownership was transferred to the city of Zurich, which has operated the Letzigrund ever since. It underwent extensive remodeling in 1947, 1958, 1973, and 1984. Lighting was added in 1973. The first open-air concert there was held in 1996.

The capacity of the stadium was 25,000 and the main pitch was 105 by 68 metres (115 yd × 74 yd), with athletics facilities. There were also three other playing fields: two lawns, an artificial turf, and a small packed sand field. The old Letzigrund also contained a bar and a restaurant within the stadium.

== New stadium (2007–present) ==
In the 1990s, the athletics club Zürich pushed for a modernisation of the facilities at Letzigrund, in order to even better accommodate the athletes of Weltklasse Zürich. In 1997, the city parliament decided favourably on an upgrade of the stadium, whereas the city administration was simultaneously working on a reconstruction plan. At the same time, the owners of the Hardturm football stadium were also planning to reconstruct their stadium.

In 2003, the new Hardturm stadium was approved by the city population in a public vote, but subsequently, legal objections by neighbourhood and environmental groups put the timely realisation for the EURO 2008 tournament, for which it was chosen by UEFA in 2002 as one of eight venues, in jeopardy. As a result, the planning process for the new Letzigrund stadium was accelerated. In 2005, the city population approved the reconstruction of the public stadium and the costs of temporarily adjusting the stadium to the requirements of EURO 2008 in two separate referendums.

Originally planned for 2009, the new Letzigrund stadium was opened on August 30, 2007. The first sports event there was the annual Weltklasse Zürich on September 7 with 26,500 spectators. The first football game was FC Zürich vs. Grasshopper Club Zürich on September 23. It hosted three games during the 2008 European championships, with a capacity of up to 30,000. The current capacity is 25,000 for football events, 26,000 for athletics and 50,000 for concerts.

On 2 October 2011, the Swiss Football League game between FC Zürich and Grasshopper Club Zürich held at the stadium saw a major incident of football hooliganism. During the 74th minute of the match, with Grasshopper Club Zürich leading 2–1, a masked FC Zürich fan threw a lit flare into the Grasshopper Club Zürich fan section. This incited a violent reaction from the Grasshopper Club Zürich fans, several dozen of whom rushed towards the fence separating the two groups and attempted to fight back with flagpoles. The referee abandoned the match due to safety concerns. Six people were injured in the riot that ensued. The game had to be abandoned with approximately 15 minutes of regular time to go. Also dubbed the "Disgrace of Zürich" (German: Skandal/Schande von Zürich) by Swiss media, this incident represented a second major episode of hooligan violence in Switzerland within five years, after a hooligan incident of similar significance occurred in Basel in 2006.

In 2025, the Administrative Court of the Canton of Zurich dismissed an appeal against the private design plan for construction at Hardturm in Zurich West, which includes a new football stadium, apartments and commercial buildings. Construction could begin in 2028 if no further legal action is taken.

== Matches ==
=== UEFA Euro 2008 ===
The stadium was one of the venues for the UEFA Euro 2008. Three games were played at the stadium during the tournament.

UEFA Euro 2008 matches played at Letzigrund
Date	Team #1	Result	Team #2	Round	Spectators
9 June 2008	Romania	0–0	France	Group C	30,585
13 June 2008	Romania	1–1	Italy	Group C	30,585
17 June 2008	France	0–2	Italy	Group C	30,585

=== International matches ===
International matches played at Letzigrund
Date	Team #1	Result	Team #2	Competition
13 October 2007	Switzerland	3–1	Austria	Men's friendly
20 November 2007	Switzerland	0–1	Nigeria	Men's friendly
6 February 2008	Portugal	3–1	Italy	Men's friendly
10 September 2008	Switzerland	1–2	Luxembourg	2010 FIFA World Cup Qualification
1 June 2012	Italy	0–3	Russia	Men's friendly
31 March 2015	Switzerland	1–1	United States	Men's friendly
29 March 2016	Switzerland	0–2	Bosnia and Herzegovina	Men's friendly
23 March 2018	Egypt	1–2	Portugal	Men's friendly
27 March 2018	Egypt	0–1	Greece	Men's friendly
29 May 2018	Kosovo	3–0	Albania	Men's friendly
22 October 2021	Switzerland	2–0	Romania	2023 FIFA Women's World Cup qualification
26 October 2021	Switzerland	5–0	Croatia	2023 FIFA Women's World Cup qualification
29 March 2022	Switzerland	1–1	Kosovo	Men's friendly
30 June 2022	Switzerland	0–4	England	Women's friendly
11 October 2022	Switzerland	2–1	Wales	2023 FIFA Women's World Cup qualification
31 October 2023	Switzerland	1–7	Spain	2023–24 UEFA Women's Nations League A
5 April 2024	Switzerland	3–1	Turkey	UEFA Women's Euro 2025 qualifying League B
25 October 2024	Switzerland	1–1	Australia	Women's friendly
15 November 2024	Switzerland	1–1	Serbia	2024–25 UEFA Nations League A
29 November 2024	Switzerland	0–6	Germany	Women's friendly
21 February 2025	Switzerland	0–0	Iceland	2025 UEFA Women's Nations League A
14 April 2026	Switzerland	3–1	Turkey	2027 FIFA Women's World Cup qualification – UEFA League B

=== UEFA Women's Euro 2025 ===
The stadium was one of the venues for the UEFA Women's Euro 2025. Five games were played at the stadium during the tournament.

Date	Time (CEST)	Team #1	Res.	Team #2	Round	Spectators
5 July 2025	21:00	France	2–1	England	Group D	22,542
9 July 2025	18:00	England	4–0	Netherlands	Group D	22,600
12 July 2025	21:00	Sweden	4–1	Germany	Group C	22,552
17 July 2025	21:00	Sweden	2–2 (2–3 pen.)	England	Quarter-finals	22,397
23 July 2025	21:00	Germany	0–1 (a.e.t)	Spain	Semi-finals	22,432

== Gallery ==
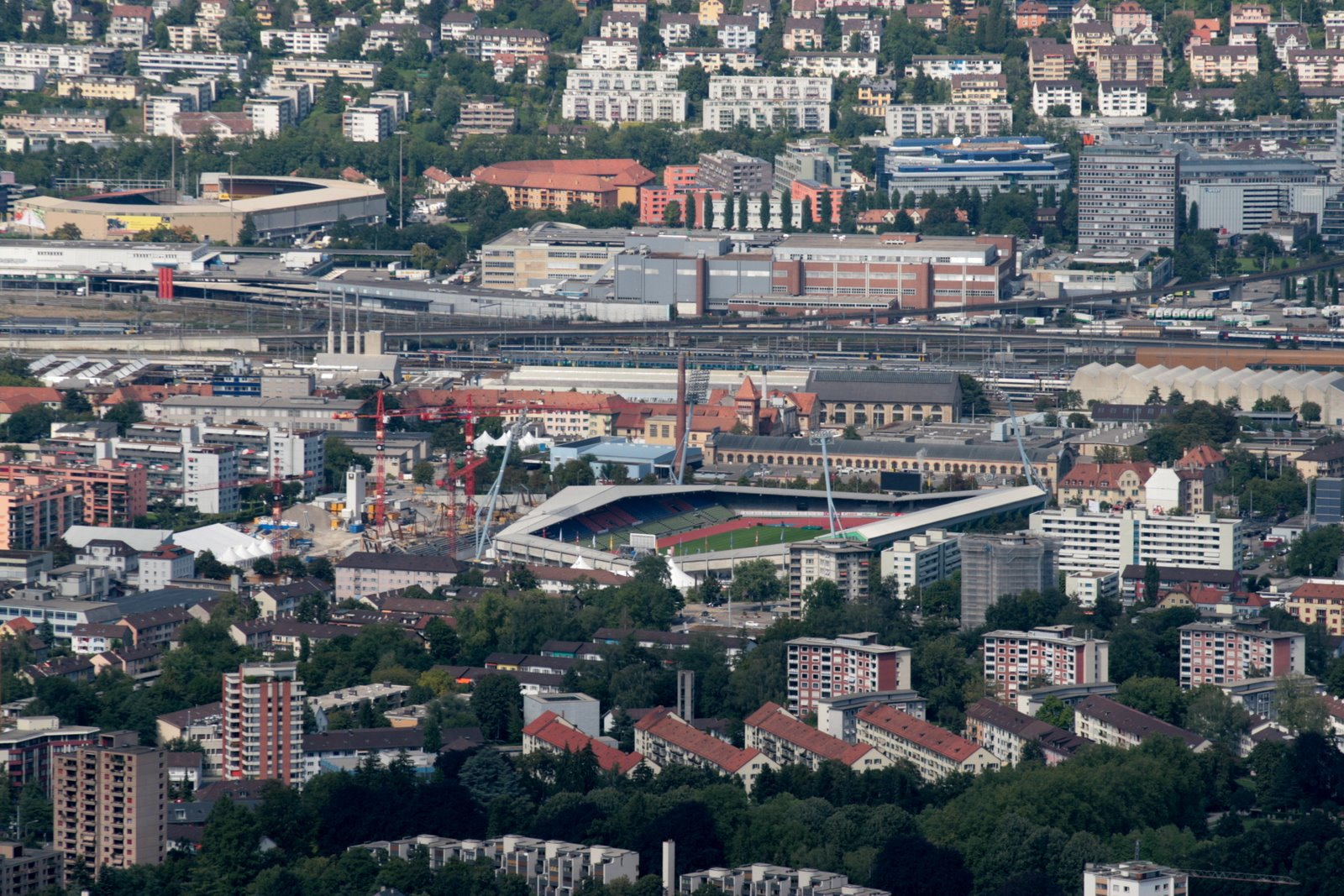
The old stadium, viewed from the Uetliberg

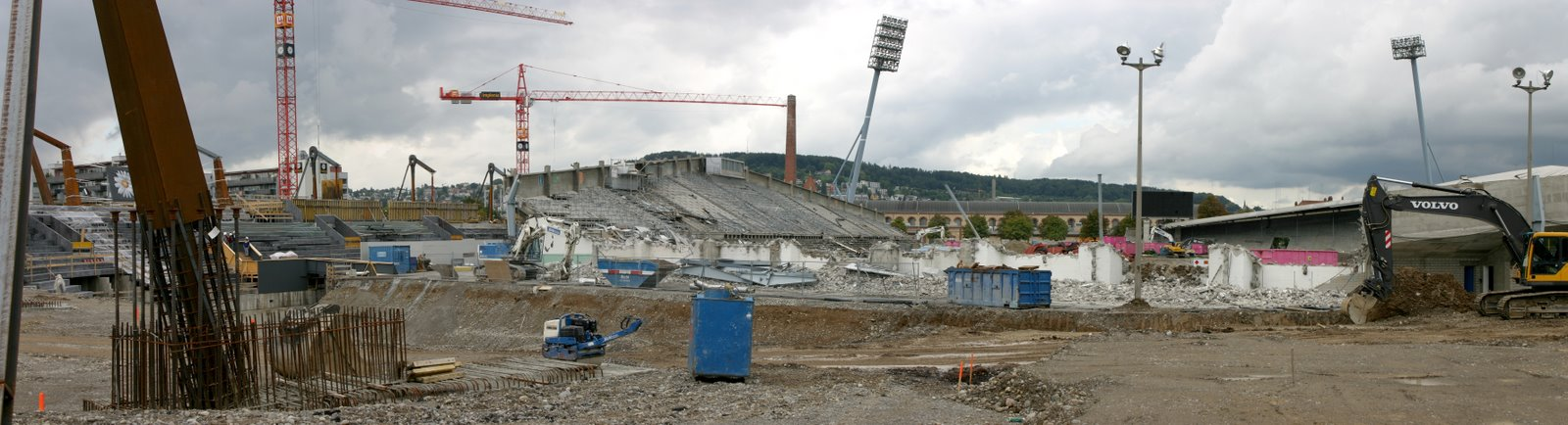
Demolition of the old stadium

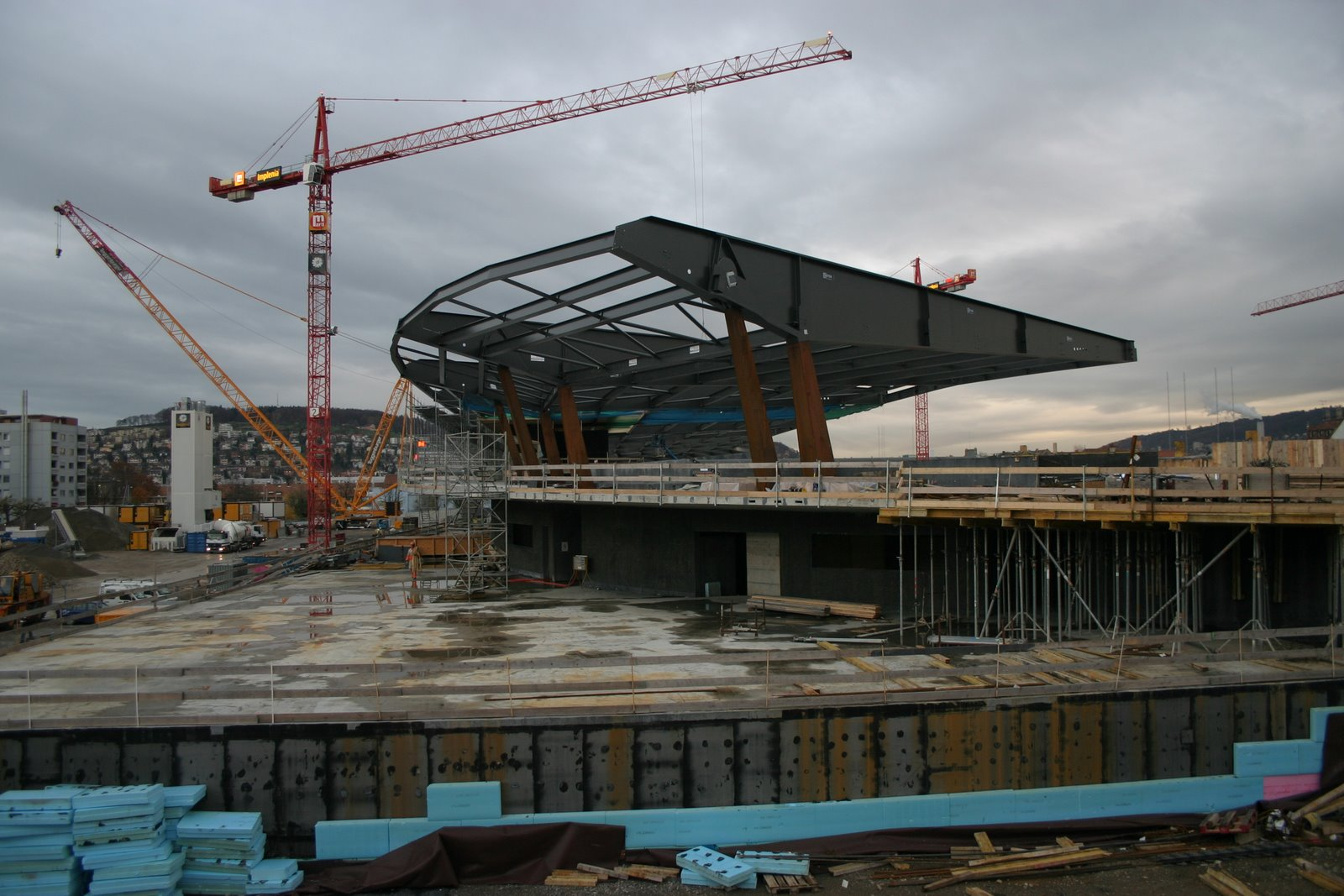
Building of the new stadium

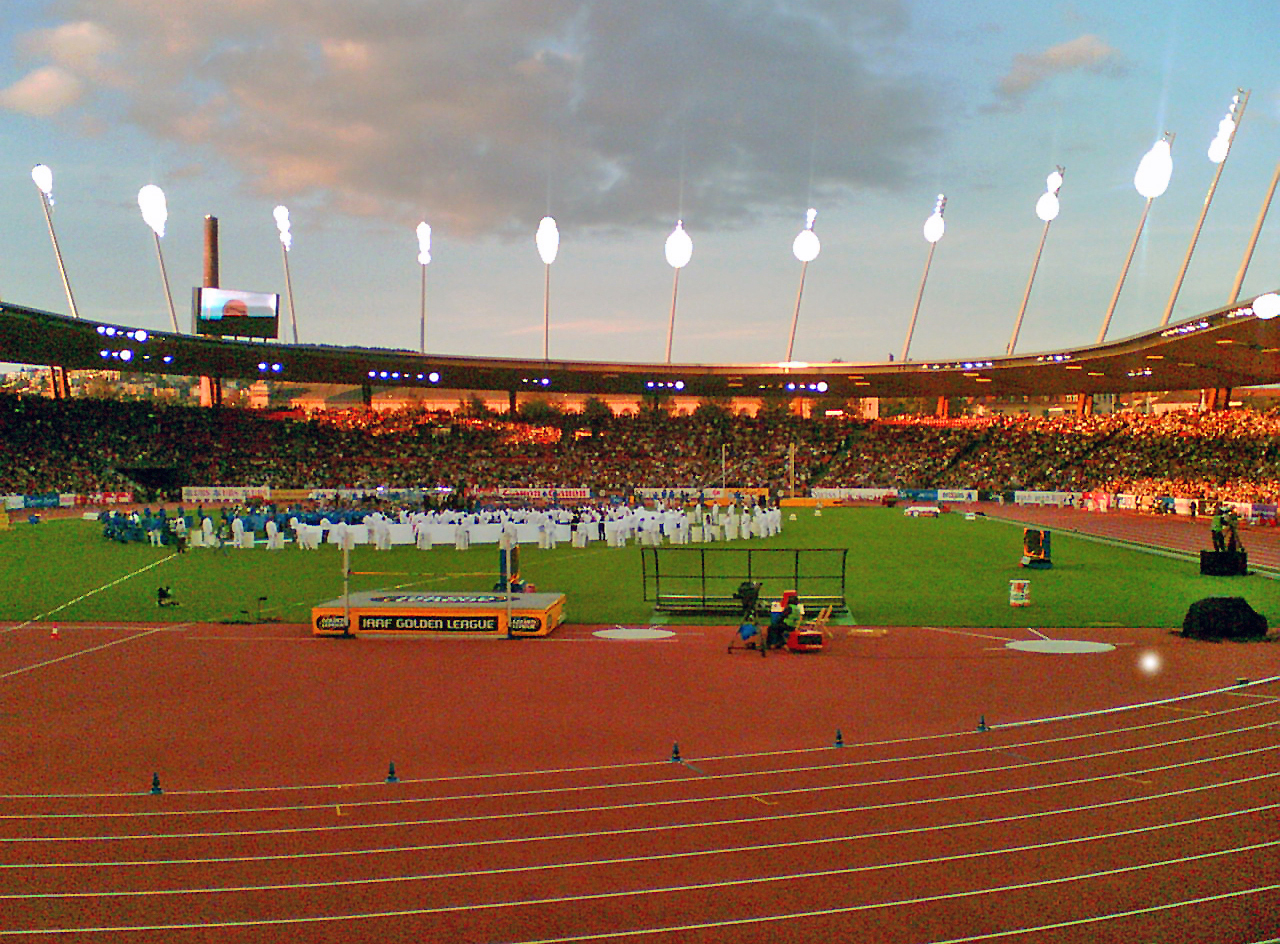
Opening ceremony (30 August 2007)

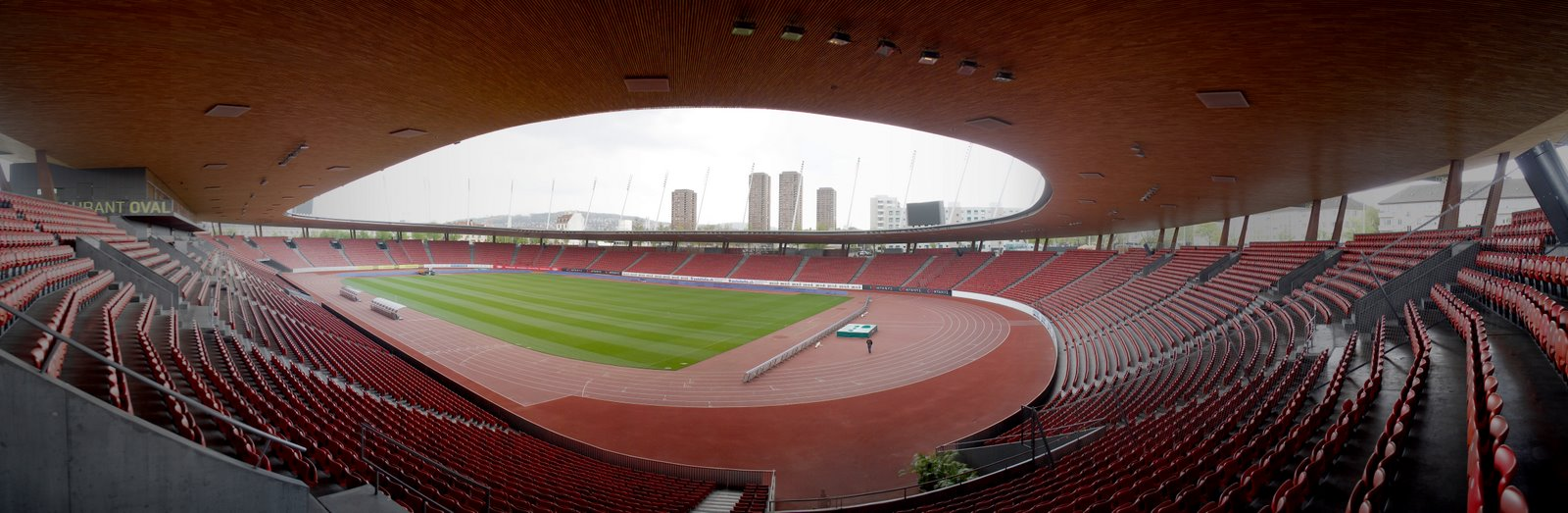
Interior view of the new Letzigrund

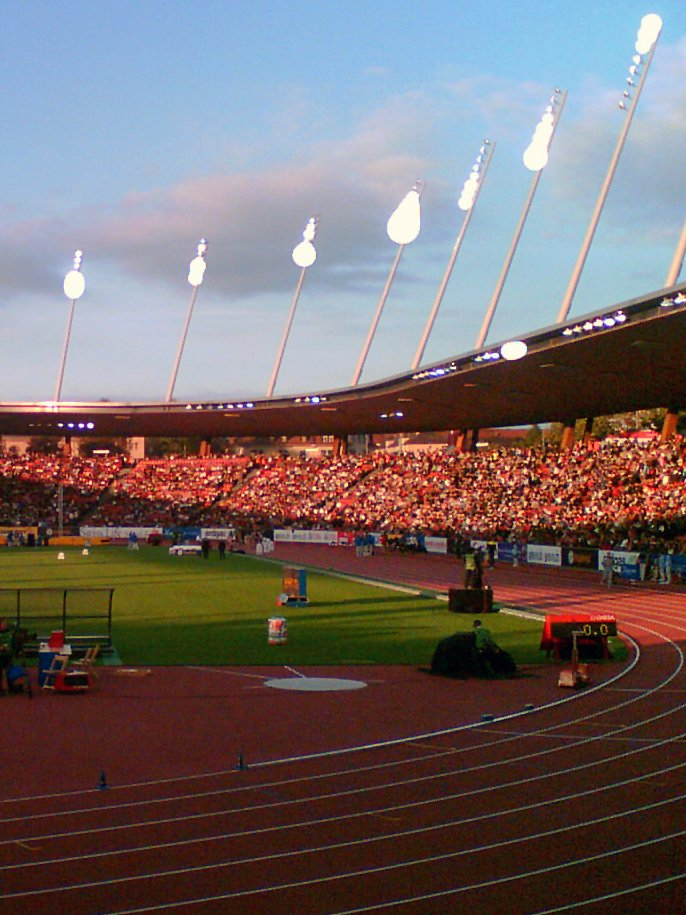
The new stadium

== Public transport ==
Letzigrund can be reached via tram lines 2, 3, 4, 13, 14 and 17.

== See also ==
- List of football stadiums in Switzerland
