= Hugh Schofield =

British television journalist

- Born: 19 August 1961 (age 64); Cardiff, Glamorgan, Wales, UK
- Education: Clifton College, Bristol; St John's College, Oxford
- Occupations: Journalist, editor, author
- Employer(s): BBC; Agence France-Presse

Hugh Robert Armstrong Schofield (born 19 August 1961) is a British journalist who is the Paris Correspondent for BBC News, the main newsgathering department of the BBC, and its 24-hour television news channels BBC World News and BBC News Channel, as well as the BBC's domestic television and radio channels and the BBC World Service. He was formerly a BBC correspondent across Europe, the Middle East and United States. He became BBC Paris Correspondent in 1996.

== Early life and education ==
Schofield was born in Cardiff in Glamorgan in South Wales, in 1961. He has an elder brother and a younger sister.

In September 1974, after leaving prep school, Schofield was educated at Clifton College, a boarding independent school in the suburb of Clifton, Bristol. He boarded at School House, and left in summer 1978. The following year, he went to St John's College at the University of Oxford, where he studied Arabic and Turkish.

Schofield's older brother, was two years his senior at Clifton College although he entered in the same year, 1974. Philip went on to become an Exhibitioner in Modern Languages at Christ Church at the University of Oxford.

== Career ==
Schofield joined the BBC in the 1980s. He is the BBC's former correspondent in the Middle East, Spain, the United States and the former Yugoslavia, and has worked for the BBC in Paris since 1996. He appears frequently on radio, television and the Internet, covering day-to-day French news and providing analysis of politics and the economy. From 2000 to 2008, he was chief correspondent in Paris at the English Language Service of the Paris-based Agence France-Presse news agency.
