= 2025 Paris Saint-Germain celebration riots =

Football riots in Paris, France

- Date: 31 May – 1 June 2025 (1 day)
- Location: Mainly Paris
- Caused by: Celebration of PSG winning the 2025 UEFA Champions League final
- Methods: Riots, civil disobedience, arson, looting

Casualties, arrests, and damages
- Deaths: 2
- Injuries: At least 192
- Arrested: 500+
- Property damage: 264 vehicles burned

On 31 May 2025, riots broke out in Paris, France, during celebrations following Paris Saint-Germain's (PSG) 5-0 victory over Inter Milan in the UEFA Champions League final. The riots resulted in two fatalities, over 190 injuries, and more than 500 arrests across France.

== Background ==
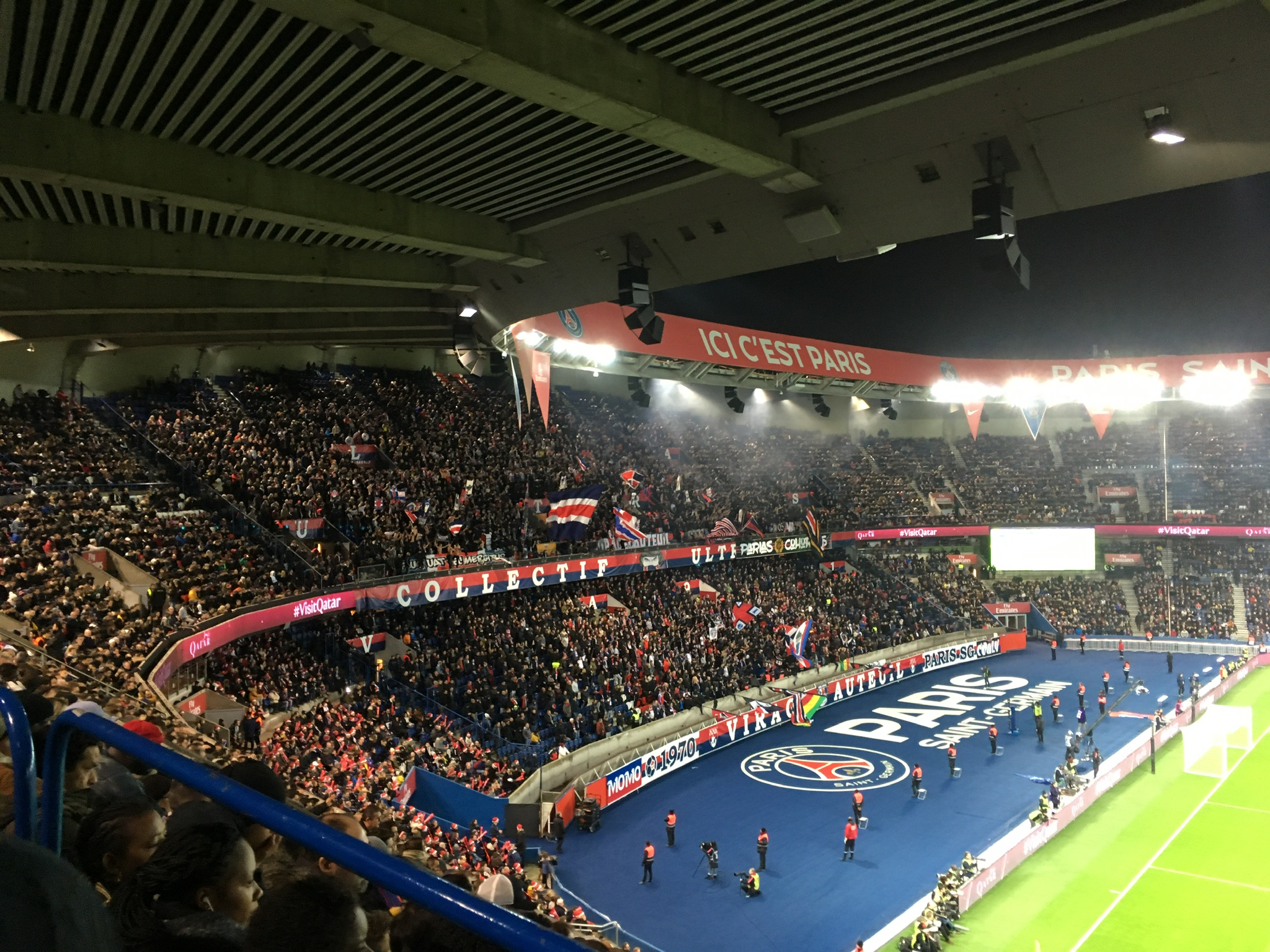
PSG Ultras in 2019 during a game against FC Nantes

Paris Saint-Germain's (PSG) UEFA Champions League victory was the club's first ever title in the competition, making them the second French club to win the Champions League after Marseille in 1993. PSG is the most popular club in France, with 22% of the country supporting the team and an estimated global fanbase of 35 million. PSG supporters, including the club's ultras, are widely regarded as some of the most devoted in football.

== Riots ==
The riots began in Paris near the Parc des Princes stadium and quickly spread to other areas of the city, including the Champs-Élysées. Groups of PSG supporters vandalized public infrastructure, launched fireworks that caused rubbish bin fires, set vehicles on fire and clashed with police. Police responded with tear gas and water cannons to disperse crowds.

The two deaths reportedly linked to the riots have since been debunked. Reportedly there was a man in his 20s who was hit by a car in Paris, turned out to be just a road accident, and a 17-year-old boy identified as Benoît Vacelet, was killed with multiple stab wounds near the Place de la Fontaine Chaude in Dax, in southwestern France. His death was later requalified by French prosecutors as an assassination.

Over 190 people were injured, including four seriously, along with minor injuries to nine police and military personnel.

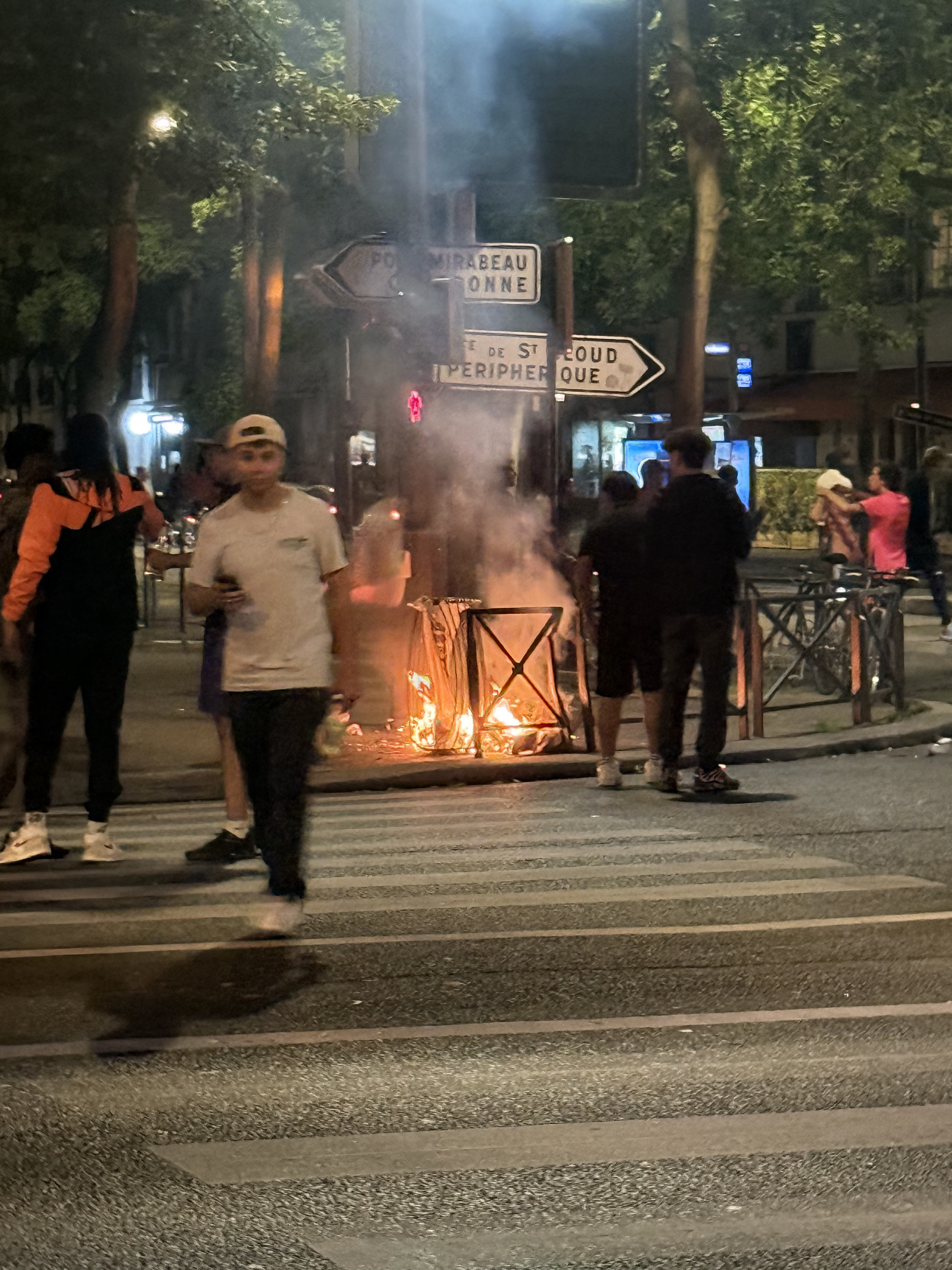
Rubbish bin on fire during 2025 Paris Saint-Germain celebration riots

== Aftermath ==
The riots sparked widespread criticism. President Emmanuel Macron said in a statement, “Nothing can justify what has happened in the last few hours, the violent clashes are unacceptable.” He also noted that the rioters didn't represent the majority of PSG's supporters. Interior Minister Bruno Retailleau condemned the rioters and called them "barbarians," drawing accusations of racism from left-wing figures.

In response to the unrest, PSG announced plans for a victory parade on the Champs-Élysées. The parade was held the following day with heightened security measures to prevent further incidents.

Some members of the left-wing to far-left La France Insoumise party criticized law enforcement, arguing that police actions had escalated the situation by preventing people from celebrating.

Several French citizens of immigrant background went on social media to denounce violence and looting by other members of immigrant communities.

== See also ==
- 2022 UEFA Champions League final chaos
- 2026 Paris Saint-Germain celebration riots
