= 2026 Paris Saint-Germain celebration riots =

Football riots in Paris, France

- Date: 30–31 May 2026 (1 day)
- Location: Mainly Paris
- Caused by: Celebration of PSG winning the 2026 UEFA Champions League final
- Methods: Riots, civil disobedience, arson, looting

Casualties, arrests, and damages
- Deaths: 1
- Injuries: 219 (Include 178 members of security forces)
- Arrested: 890
- Property damage: Hundreds of vehicles and businesses damaged or burned

On 30 May 2026, riots broke out in Paris, France, during celebrations following Paris Saint-Germain’s (PSG) victory over Arsenal in the UEFA Champions League final. The disturbances spread across several French cities and resulted in one death, 219 injuries (out of the 219 injuries, 178 were members of security forces), and 890 arrests nationwide.

== Background ==
On 30 May 2026, Paris Saint-Germain defeated Arsenal in the 2026 UEFA Champions League final, securing the club’s second consecutive UEFA Champions League title. Large crowds gathered throughout Paris, including on the Champs-Élysées and around the Parc des Princes, to celebrate the victory. French authorities deployed thousands of police officers ahead of the celebrations due to concerns about public disorder following similar incidents after PSG’s 2025 European triumph.

== Riots ==
Celebrations were accompanied by outbreaks of violence, vandalism, looting, and clashes with police. Numerous vehicles were set on fire, businesses were damaged, and fireworks were launched at law-enforcement officers. Riot police responded with tear gas and crowd-control measures.

Disturbances were reported in Paris as well as in other French cities, including Rennes, Strasbourg, Grenoble, Toulouse, and Clermont-Ferrand. Authorities reported that hundreds of individuals were detained during the unrest.

== Casualties and damage ==
French authorities confirmed one death linked to the celebrations. More than 200 people, including police officers and civilians, were reported injured. Significant property damage occurred, including burned vehicles, damaged storefronts, and public infrastructure.

== Aftermath ==
President Emmanuel Macron, while hosting the team, condemned the riots and said: "I don't want that we get used to it, this is not football, this is not sport, this is not what we love. We will be uncompromising with those who have been caught. We do not want to see this happen again. It's over. We've had enough. This must end."

Prime minister Sébastien Lecornu announced plans to request an extraordinary session of Parliament in early July to passage of a RIPOST security bill after the riots. The bill targets activities the government considers sources of everyday disorder, while also expanding certain police and surveillance powers.

== See also ==
- 2022 UEFA Champions League final chaos
- 2025 Paris Saint-Germain celebration riots
