= 2006 Basel hooligan incident =

Football riot in Basel, Switzerland

The 2006 Basel hooligan incident (often called "Disgrace of Basel") occurred on 13 May 2006 in Basel, Switzerland. On that day hooligans supporting the Swiss football club FC Basel 1893 stormed the field of St. Jakob-Park after a championship-deciding match against FC Zürich. Zürich scored in the dying moments of the match and won 2–1. The goal ended a chance for Basel to win the Swiss Super League for a third time in a row. This resulted in property damage and riots between hooligans of both teams' supporters after the match, an incident considered one of the worst incidents involving hooliganism in Swiss sport to date. 115 people, including police, were injured, with 15 hospitalizations.

== Course of events ==
FC Basel and FC Zürich were practically neck and neck for the entire 2005–06 Swiss Super League season. It all came down to a last match between the two teams on May 13 in Basel. Basel were in the lead, three points ahead, and had a home fixture in the sold out St. Jakob-Park against their sole remaining rivals for the title Zürich. Basel needed just a draw to be Swiss champions, while Zürich needed a win to top Basel and earn the championship through a better goal difference.

The game itself was fought fiercely with many fouls on both sides. In the 90th minute the score was 1-1 which would have meant that Basel would have been championship winners by three points. In the 93rd minute Zürich were awarded a throw-in from the right side of the field. The ball was thrown in to the right flank of the field, where midfielder Florian Stahel crossed the ball into the Basel penalty area. The Basel defense failed to remove the ball and it came to Zürich defender Iulian Filipescu who shot the ball past Basel goalkeeper Pascal Zuberbühler into the left hand corner of the goal. Referee Massimo Busacca ended the match directly after the goal and Zürich were declared champions.

Zürich players started celebrating with their team officials. Thirty seconds after the final whistle, dozens of Basel supporters stormed the pitch and started attacking Zürich players and officials who then tried to flee into the changing rooms. Filipescu was attacked numerous times. A flare was thrown, but missed him. On the other end of the stadium the small group of 500 Zürich supporters who had travelled to the match started celebrating with their players. The police built a human wall near the center line to prevent the Basel hooligans from advancing any further.

The supporters of Zürich also invaded the field illegally. Whilst celebrating with their fans Filipescu was attacked again by Basel hooligans and he kicked the attackers out of their vicinity (alongside team-mate Alhassane Keita) before the police detained them. The victory ceremony was held on the main stands instead of on the playing field because the hooligans were still clashing with the police, who were beginning to outnumber the hooligans. The clashes did not end after the match: further battles were held between hooligans and police outside the stadium and lasted until late into the night. The police used water cannons and rubber bullets to restore order.

== Consequences ==
FC Basel distanced itself from the hooligans.

=== Fines and sanctions for the clubs involved ===
Basel were punished because of their inability to control their supporters. The club was fined 80,000 Swiss Francs. Additionally the first two home games of the 2006-2007 season were held without spectators. The following three games were to be held with just three-quarters of stadium capacity, with the eastern corner (called the "Muttenzerkurve") of the stadium unoccupied during the games.

FC Zürich were also sanctioned because of their inability to prevent their fans setting foot on the field, leading to a fine of 30,000 Swiss Francs.

=== Prosecution of rioters ===
On 7 November 2008, 26 individuals involved were convicted of rioting. 22 were given fines and three received suspended prison sentences.

=== Broader impact ===
Many security procedures for UEFA Euro 2008 in Switzerland and Austria were reviewed due to these events. Furthermore, an agreement between Swiss cantonal authorities came into effect on 1 January 2010 as a consequence of the incident. This agreement pledges strict measures and inter-cantonal cooperation against violent criminals in the vicinity of sporting events and defines, for the first time, the carrying and use of pyrotechnics in stadiums as a violent crime to be prosecuted as such. Notably, the cantons of Basel-Stadt and Basel-Landschaft, where most FC Basel supporters reside, have refused to become signatories to the agreement.

== Sources and references ==
- The disgrace of Basel 13-05-2006 (Basel – Zurich) an English link to footballviolence.wordpress.com
- Swiss Football and the Disgrace of Basel an English link to pitchinvasion.net
- https://www.blick.ch/sport/fussball/blick-kick/die-schande-von-basel-2006-fcb-chaoten-greifen-fcz-meisterteam-an-id17450026.html Two players (one FC Basel, one FC Zurich) reflect on the incident 10 years later
- More footage on YouTube: https://www.youtube.com/watch?v=SN_qbl7uG7w , https://www.youtube.com/watch?v=g2zBvEsJfSw
