= Grasshopper Club Zurich =

Swiss sports club

Grasshopper Club Zürich
- Full name: Grasshopper Club Zürich
- Nickname: Hoppers
- Short name: Grasshopper Club; Grasshoppers; GC; GCZ
- Founded: 1 September 1886; 140 years ago
- Ground: Letzigrund
- Capacity: 26,104
- Owner: Bridge Football
- President: Ludovic Deléchat
- Coach: Vacant
- League: Swiss Super League
- 2025–26: 11th of 12
- Website: gcz.ch
| Home colours | Away colours | Third colours |

Grasshopper Club Zurich (GCZ), commonly referred to as Grasshopper Club or simply just GC, is a professional multisports club based in Zurich, Switzerland. The oldest and best-known department of the club is its football team. With 27 league titles, the Grasshoppers hold the records for winning the most national championships and the Swiss Cups, with 19 trophies in the latter. The club is the oldest football team in Zurich and maintains a substantial rivalry with FC Zurich.

The origin of Grasshoppers name is unknown, although the most common explanation refers to its early players' energetic post-goal celebrations and that their style of play was nimble and energetic.

After a number of appearances in European Cups and the UEFA Champions League, the Grasshopper Club has become one of Switzerland's most recognizable football clubs. Today, in addition to its main football squad, the club has competitive professional and youth teams in rowing, ice hockey, handball, lawn tennis, court tennis, field hockey, curling, basketball, rugby, squash, floorball and beach soccer.

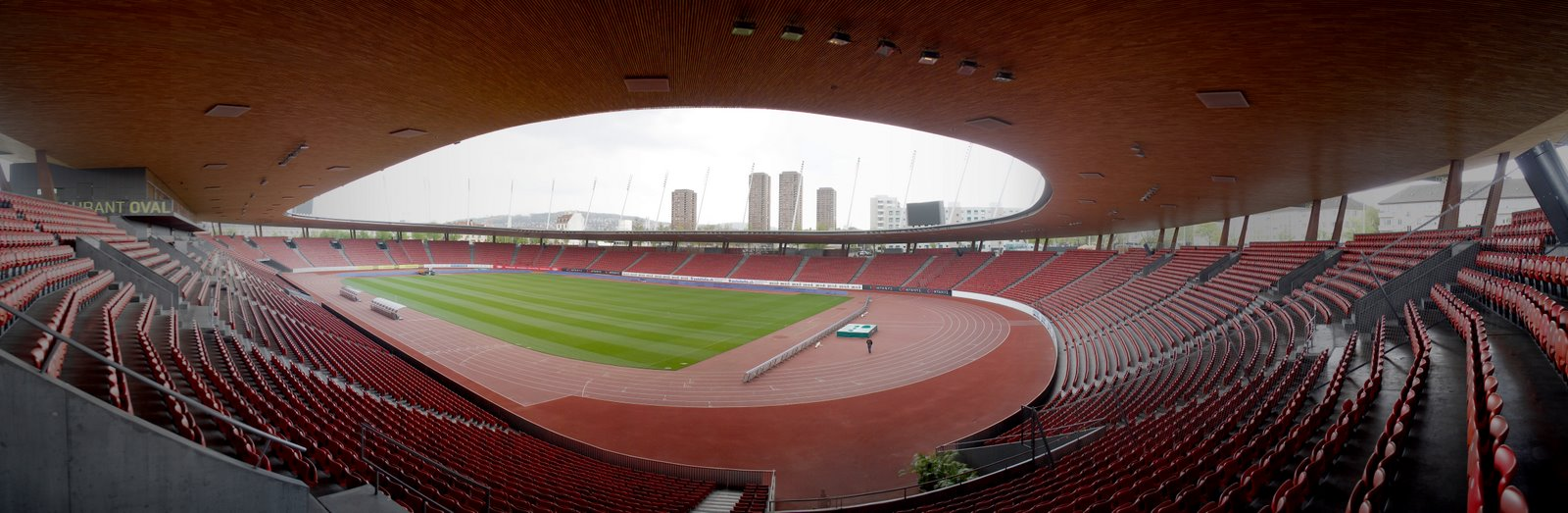
Grasshopper Stadium Letzigrund

== History ==
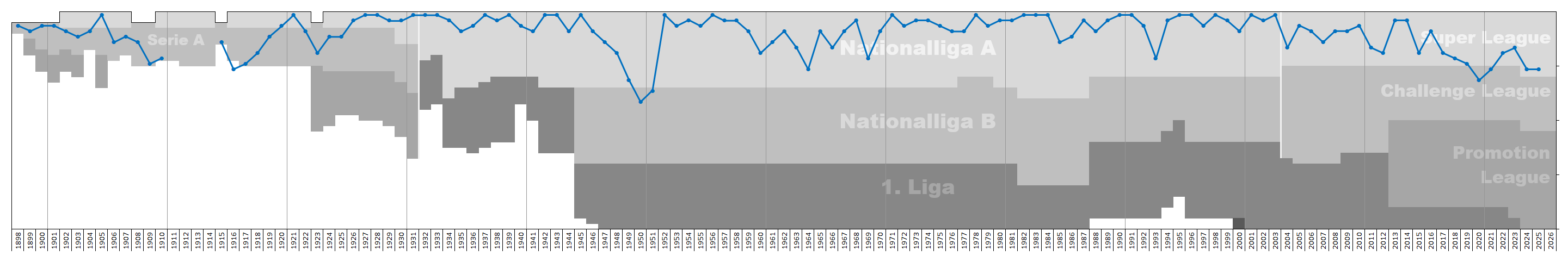
Chart of GCZ table positions in the Swiss football league system

Grasshopper Club Zurich was founded on 1 September 1886 by Tom E. Griffith, an English student. In 1893, the Grasshopper Club became the first Swiss team to play in (what was then) Germany, defeating Strasbourg 1–0. The first Swiss championships (then called "Serie A") were held in 1897–98 and were won by the Grasshoppers, as was the first championship played using a league system in 1899–1900.

Their biggest European success to date came in the 1977–78 UEFA Cup where they reached the semi-final against French side Bastia. After a 3–2 win at home, they traveled to Corsica for the second leg but lost 0–1 and were eliminated due to the away goal rule.

In 1997, the Grasshopper Club was incorporated and as of May 2005, it is formally organized as Neue Grasshopper Fussball AG. In doing so, Grasshopper became the first Swiss sports club to go public.

Their to date last Swiss championship title was won in 2003. In 2013, the Grasshoppers ended a ten-year trophy drought with a penalty shoot-out victory over Basel in the Swiss Cup final. It would be the last trophy won for over a decade.

In 2019, the Grasshoppers were relegated to the second division for the first time in 68 years.

In April 2020, it was revealed that the Hong Kong–based Champion Union HK Holding Limited had acquired 90% of GC shares.

On 17 January 2024, a long-term partnership with American Major League Soccer (MLS) side Los Angeles FC was announced, with LAFC acquiring over 90% of the shares from the previous owners, Champion Union.

On 28 April 2026, According to The New York Times, Los Angeles FC offers to sell Swiss side Grasshopper Club Zurich after fan protests.

On 29 June 2026, According to the Bloomberg, Grasshopper Club Zurich Sold by LA Team to Bridge Football.

== Stadium and grounds ==
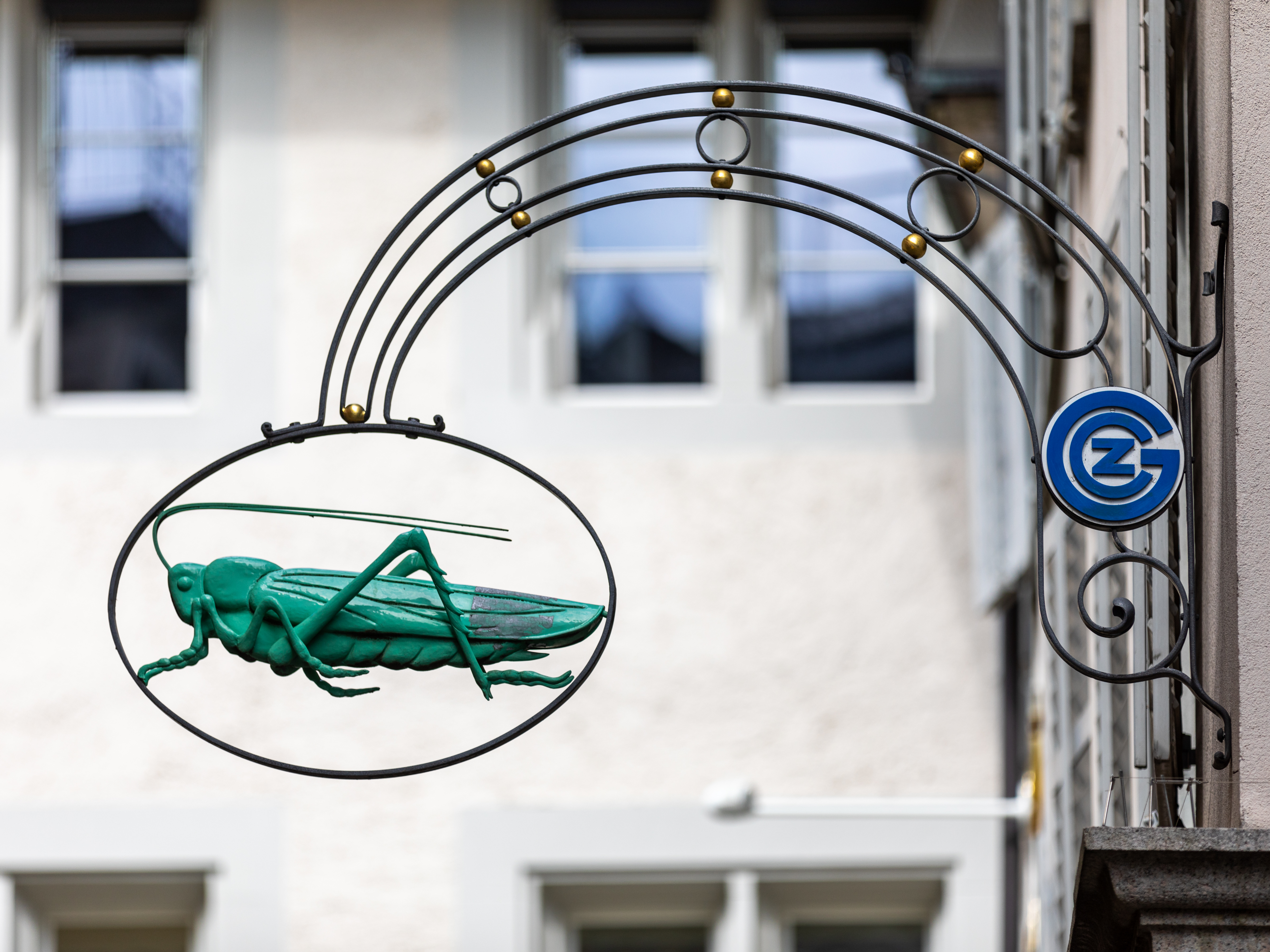
Cantilever sign Grasshopper Club Zürich

Since September 2007, Grasshopper Club Zurich has played all of its home matches in the Letzigrund stadium which is the regular home ground of FC Zurich. After the completion of the new Stadion Zurich (currently in planning stage), both teams are expected to play there.

From 1929 to 2007, the Grasshopper Club had their own home ground in the Hardturm stadium, however, this was demolished in December 2008. Before 1929, home matches were played at various other venues.

Training facilities and their football academy are located in Niederhasli, where in 2005 the club opened a comprehensive facility including five practice pitches, apartments for youth players and offices.

== Rivalries ==
=== FC Zurich ===
FC Zurich was founded ten years after GC in 1896. A year later, the first derby between the two Zurich clubs was held as part of the first Swiss championship, where GC defeated FC Zurich 7–2. As the two teams did not always play in the same league, it would take nearly 70 years until the 100th derby. To date, 251 official derbies have been held, with GC leading with 121 wins to FC Zurich's 90, leaving 39 draws.

The 2 October 2011 Swiss league match between the two teams is known by Swiss media as the "Disgrace of Zurich", due to rioting by FC Zurich fans. The violence followed Grasshopper supporters stealing FC Zurich fan banners and displaying them in their own section with a message mocking FC Zurich.

=== Basel ===
Basel has long been a rival to GC, owing largely to the rivalry between the two cities. As a result, games between Grasshoppers and Basel are also often heated games, often leading to clashes between fans.

From the late 60s to the early 80s, both GC and Basel had numerous Swiss championship victories. However, in 1988, Basel was relegated to the Nationalliga B. The rivalry flared up at the beginning of the 21st century, when FCB's improved performance has made them a mainstay at the top the Swiss league. However, with FCB's rise came GC's downfall and the rivalry has become largely one-sided. The most recent notable meeting between the two teams was the Swiss Cup Final in 2013, where Grasshoppers were able to beat Basel in penalties, with a score of 1–1 after extra time.

== Honours ==
=== National ===
==== League ====
- Swiss Championship
  - Champions (27): 1897–98, 1899–1900, 1900–01, 1904–05, 1920–21, 1926–27, 1927–28, 1930–31, 1936–37, 1938–39, 1941–42, 1942–43, 1944–45, 1951–52, 1955–56, 1970–71, 1977–78, 1981–82, 1982–83, 1983–84, 1989–90, 1990–91, 1994–95, 1995–96, 1997–98, 2000–01, 2002–03 (record)
  - Runner-up (21): 1925–16, 1928–29, 1929–30, 1932–33, 1933–34, 1937–38, 1953–54, 1956–57, 1957–58, 1967–68, 1972–73, 1973–74, 1979–80, 1980–81, 1986–87, 1988–89, 1993–94, 1998–99, 2001–02, 2012–13, 2013–14
- Nationalliga B/Challenge League
  - Winners (2): 1950–51, 2020–21

==== Cups ====
- Swiss Cup
  - Winners (19): 1925–26, 1926–27, 1931–32, 1933–34, 1936–37, 1937–38, 1939–40, 1940–41, 1941–42, 1942–43, 1945–46, 1951–52, 1955–56, 1982–83, 1987–88, 1988–89, 1989–90, 1993–94, 2012–13 (record)
  - Runner-up (13): 1927–28, 1930–31, 1932–33, 1948–49, 1952–53, 1957–58, 1962–63, 1977–78, 1992–93, 1994–95, 1998–99, 2001–02, 2003–04
- Swiss League Cup
  - Winners: 1973, 1974–75
  - Runner-up: 1977–78, 1979–80
- Swiss Super Cup
  - Winners: 1989
  - Runner-up: 1988, 1990

=== European ===
- Champions League/European Cup
  - Quarter-finalist: 1978–79
- Europa League/UEFA Cup
  - Semi-finalist: 1977–78
- European Cup Winners' Cup
  - Quarter-finalist: 1989–90

== Players ==
=== Current squad ===
As of 8 September 2026

Note: Flags indicate national team as defined under FIFA eligibility rules; some limited exceptions apply. Players may hold more than one non-FIFA nationality.

| No. | Pos. | Nation | Player |
|---|---|---|---|
| 1 | GK | SUI | Marvin Hübel |
| 4 | DF | BIH | Luka Mikulić |
| 5 | MF | BEN | Imourane Hassane |
| 6 | MF | ALB | Amir Abrashi (captain) |
| 7 | FW | ENG | Luke Plange |
| 8 | MF | SUI | Tim Meyer |
| 9 | FW | SUI | Nikolas Muci |
| 10 | MF | ESP | Óscar Clemente |
| 11 | MF | SUI | Giotto Morandi |
| 15 | DF | MLI | Abdoulaye Diaby |
| 16 | MF | ITA | Matteo Mantini |
| 17 | MF | SUI | Samuel Krasniqi |
| 18 | FW | KOR | Lee Young-jun |
| 20 | FW | ITA | Diego Ferrazza |
| 22 | DF | ITA | Pantaleo Creti |
| 23 | MF | SUI | Samuel Marques |

| No. | Pos. | Nation | Player |
|---|---|---|---|
| 24 | MF | NED | Kenzo Goudmijn (on loan from Derby County) |
| 25 | DF | USA | John Hilton |
| 28 | DF | SUI | Simone Stroscio (vice-captain) |
| 31 | MF | AUT | Maximilian Ullmann |
| 34 | DF | SUI | Allan Arigoni |
| 44 | DF | ALB | Bujar Pllana |
| 55 | MF | SUI | Dominik Papic |
| 56 | MF | SUI | Denis Sahin |
| 57 | DF | SUI | Nico Rissi |
| 58 | DF | GER | Yannick Bettkober |
| 60 | FW | SUI | Samuele Bengondo |
| 66 | MF | ESP | Manex Guibelalde |
| 71 | GK | SUI | Justin Hammel |
| 73 | DF | ITA | Dorian Paloschi |
| 81 | FW | SUI | Julian von Moos |

==== Out on loan ====
Note: Flags indicate national team as defined under FIFA eligibility rules; some limited exceptions apply. Players may hold more than one non-FIFA nationality.

| No. | Pos. | Nation | Player |
|---|---|---|---|
| — | DF | KOS | Ismajl Beka (at FC Rapperswil-Jona until 30 June 2027) |
| — | DF | SUI | Loris Giandomenico (at Greuther Fürth until 30 June 2027) |
| — | MF | CIV | Salifou Diarrassouba (at FC Rapperswil-Jona until 30 June 2027) |

| No. | Pos. | Nation | Player |
|---|---|---|---|
| — | FW | GAM | Alieu Conateh (at Austria Lustenau until 30 June 2027) |
| — | FW | URU | Anderson Rodríguez (at FC Wacker Innsbruck until 31 December 2026) |
| — | FW | ARG | Tomás Verón Lupi (at Nacional until 31 December 2026) |

=== Women's team ===
The women's division was founded in 2009, when GC/Schwerzenbach (originally FFC Schwerzenbach) was absorbed into the club.

As of 1 October 2025

Note: Flags indicate national team as defined under FIFA eligibility rules; some limited exceptions apply. Players may hold more than one non-FIFA nationality.

| No. | Pos. | Nation | Player |
|---|---|---|---|
| 1 | GK | SUI | Isabel Rutishauser |
| 4 | MF | SUI | Victoria Laino |
| 6 | DF | SUI | Luna Lempérière (captain) |
| 7 | FW | SUI | Janina Egli |
| 8 | MF | CRO | Ella Ljuština |
| 9 | MF | ALB | Qendresa Krasniqi |
| 10 | MF | SUI | Yllka Kadriu |
| 11 | FW | AUT | Noémie Potier |
| 12 | FW | JAM | Kayla McKenna |
| 13 | DF | SUI | Leandra Flury |
| 14 | FW | ITA | Nicole Arcangeli |
| 15 | MF | ESP | Marta Cazalla |
| 16 | FW | SUI | Emanuela Pfister |
| 17 | MF | SUI | Yade Bayrakdar |
| 18 | DF | SUI | Luana Valsangiacomo |
| 19 | FW | SUI | Ramona Kannady |
| 20 | MF | MAR | Imane Touriss |

| No. | Pos. | Nation | Player |
|---|---|---|---|
| 21 | DF | SUI | Emma Egli |
| 22 | DF | FRA | Morgane Nicoli |
| 23 | DF | SUI | Viola Avduli |
| 24 | MF | SUI | Giulia Looser |
| 25 | MF | FRA | Landryna Lushimba Bilombi |
| 26 | MF | SUI | Laura Kott |
| 27 | DF | SUI | Melanie Müller |
| 28 | FW | SLO | Nina Predanič |
| 29 | DF | SUI | Valentina Gerlof |
| 30 | MF | POR | Rita Almeida |
| 32 | MF | GER | Michelle Storni |
| 33 | MF | SUI | Rebecca Villena |
| 35 | DF | GER | Laeticia Tyla |
| 41 | GK | SUI | Yara Zwyssig |
| 90 | FW | ARG | Dalila Ippólito |
| 99 | GK | USA | Lauren Kozal |

== Notable former players ==
Players for the Swiss national football team

- (Switzerland) Alfred "Fredy" Bickel
- (Switzerland) Thomas Bickel
- (Switzerland) Stéphane Chapuisat
- (Switzerland) Patrick de Napoli
- (Switzerland) Ricardo Cabanas
- (Switzerland) Diego Benaglio
- (Switzerland) Christoph Spycher
- (Switzerland) Christian Gross
- (Switzerland) Marcel Koller
- (Switzerland) Stephan Lichtsteiner
- (Switzerland) Patrick Müller
- (Switzerland) Boris Smiljanić
- (Switzerland) Roman Bürki
- (Switzerland) Pajtim Kasami
- (Switzerland) Ciriaco Sforza
- (Switzerland) Alain Sutter
- (Switzerland) Kubilay Türkyilmaz
- (Switzerland) Johann Vogel
- (Switzerland) Eldin Jakupović
- (Switzerland) Blaise Nkufo
- (Switzerland) Yann Sommer
- (Switzerland) Hakan Yakin
- (Switzerland) Murat Yakin
- (Switzerland) Reto Ziegler
- (Switzerland) Raimondo Ponte
- (Switzerland) Claudio Sulser
- (Switzerland) Stéphane Grichting
- (Switzerland) Haris Seferovic
- (Switzerland) Philippe Senderos
- (Switzerland) Bernt Haas

Players with World Cup appearances for their national teams

- (Austria) Kurt Jara
- (Bosnia and Herzegovina) Izet Hajrović
- (Bosnia and Herzegovina) Senad Lulić
- (Germany) Günter Netzer
- (Iran) Daniel Davari
- (Italy) Vittorio Pozzo
- (New Zealand) Wynton Rufer
- (Nigeria) Efan Ekoku
- (Nigeria) Femi Opabunmi
- (Peru) Franco Navarro
- (Poland) Tomasz Rząsa
- (Romania) Viorel Moldovan
- (Scotland) Tosh McKinlay
- (Senegal) Papa Bouba Diop
- (Senegal) Henri Camara
- (Sweden) Ove Grahn
- (Sweden) Mats Gren
- (Sweden) Kim Källström

== Coaching staff ==
=== Current coaching staff ===
As of 4 May 2026

| Position | Name | Since |
|---|---|---|
| Head coach | (Germany) Peter Zeidler | 05/2026 |
| Assistant coach | (Albania) Shkëlzen Gashi | 03/2026 |
| Athletic coach | (Switzerland) Jörg Mikoleit | 06/2024 |
| Goalie Coach | (Switzerland) Andreas Hilfiker | 07/2025 |
| Video analyst | (Switzerland) Claudio Spiegel | 07/2025 |

=== Academy Coaches and Staff ===
As of 31 October 2025

| Position | Name | Since |
|---|---|---|
| Technical Director | (Switzerland) Remo Gaugler | 05/2024 |
| Technical Director | (Switzerland) Sandro Chieffo | 05/2024 |
| Talent Manager | (Germany) Sascha Müller | 03/2023 |
| Under 21 | (Austria) Gernot Messner (Bosnia and Herzegovina) Daniel Pavlović | 10/2025; 08/2024 |
| Under 19 | (Germany) Dominik Probst (Switzerland) Francesco Satalino | 06/2024; 08/2024 |
| Under 17 | (Germany) Jacob Wolf (Switzerland) Goran Petrovic | 07/2023; 08/2024 |
| Under 16 | (Switzerland) Raffaele Cardiello (Switzerland) Adriano Mazza | 08/2024; 08/2024 |
| Under 15 | (Switzerland) Ufuk Üsküp (Switzerland) Oliver Buff | 08/2024; 08/2024 |
| Head Goalkeeping Coach | (Switzerland) Andreas Hilfiker | 08/2024 |
| Goalkeeping Coach | (Switzerland) Gustavo Steffanuto Moino | 08/2024 |

=== List of coaches (since 1925) ===
- (Hungary) Izidor "Dori" Kürschner (1925–34)
- (Austria) Karl Rappan (1935–48)
- (Switzerland) Gerhard "Hardy" Walter (1948–50)
- (Germany) Willi Treml (1950–55)
- (Austria) Willi Hahnemann (1955–58)
- (Socialist Federal Republic of Yugoslavia) Svetislav Glišović (1958)
- (Socialist Federal Republic of Yugoslavia) Antun Pogačnik and (Switzerland) Alfred "Fredy" Bickel (1958–60)
- (Socialist Federal Republic of Yugoslavia) Branislav Vukosavljević (1960–63)
- (Switzerland) Alfred "Fredy" Bickel (1963–64)
- (Germany) Albert Sing (1964–66)
- (Switzerland) Walter Brunner and (Switzerland) Werner Schley (1966–67)
- (France) Henri Skiba (1967–69)
- (Switzerland) Walter Brunner and (Switzerland) Werner Schley (1969–70)
- (Switzerland) René Hüssy (1970–73)
- (Switzerland) Erich Vogel and (Hungary) István Szabó (1973–76)
- (Germany) Helmuth Johannsen (1 July 1976 – 30 June 1979)
- (Germany) Jürgen Sundermann (1 July 1979 – 30 June 1980)
- (Germany) Friedhelm Konietzka (1980–82)
- (Germany) Hennes Weisweiler (1 July 1982 – 5 July 1983)
- (Socialist Federal Republic of Yugoslavia) Miroslav Blažević (1983 – 30 June 1985)
- (Germany) Friedhelm Konietzka (1985–86)
- (Austria) Kurt Jara (1 November 1986 – 30 June 1988)
- (Germany) Ottmar Hitzfeld (1 July 1988 – 30 June 1991)
- (Czechoslovakia) Oldrich Svab (1991–92)
- (Netherlands) Leo Beenhakker (1 July 1992 – 30 June 1993)
- (Switzerland) Christian Gross (1 July 1993 – 23 November 1997)
- (Switzerland) Hanspeter Latour (interim) (1997)
- (Austria) Rolf Fringer (1 January 1998 – 17 December 1998)
- (Switzerland) Roger Hegi (1 January 1999 – 1 August 1999)
- (England) Roy Hodgson (1 July 1999 – 30 June 2000)
- (Netherlands) Piet Hamberg (interim) (2000)
- (Switzerland) Hanspeter Zaugg (22 June 2000 – 8 January 2002)
- (Switzerland) Marcel Koller (1 January 2002 – 2 October 2003)
- (Argentina) Carlos Bernegger (interim) (3 October 2003 – 22 December 2003)
- (Switzerland) Alain Geiger (23 December 2003 – 4 October 2004)
- (Argentina) Carlos Bernegger (interim) (4 October 2004 – 31 December 2004)
- (Bulgaria) Krassimir Balakov (16 January 2006 – 21 May 2007)
- (Argentina) Carlos Bernegger (interim) (2007)
- (Switzerland) Hanspeter Latour (1 July 2007 – 30 June 2009)
- (Switzerland) Ciriaco Sforza (1 July 2009 – 15 April 2012)
- (Switzerland) Uli Forte (16 April 2012 – 30 June 2013)
- (Germany) Michael Skibbe (1 July 2013 – 8 January 2015)
- (Switzerland) Pierluigi Tami (15 January 2015 – 12 March 2017)
- (Argentina) Carlos Bernegger (12 March 2017 – 24 August 2017)
- (Switzerland) Murat Yakin (28 August 2017 – 10 April 2018)
- (Switzerland) Mathias Walther (10 April 2018 – 23 April 2018) (caretaker)
- (Germany) Thorsten Fink (23 April 2018 – 4 March 2019)
- (Croatia) Tomislav Stipic (6 March 2019 – 9 April 2019)
- (Switzerland) Uli Forte (9 April 2019 – 7 February 2020)
- (Austria) Goran Djuricin (10 February 2020 – 15 May 2020)
- (Romania) Zoltán Kádár (15 May 2020 – 5 August 2020) (caretaker)
- (Portugal) João Carlos Pereira (6 August 2020 – 5 May 2021)
- (Romania) Zoltán Kádár (5 May 2021 – 9 June 2021) (caretaker)
- (Switzerland) Giorgio Contini (9 June 2021 – 9 June 2023)
- (Switzerland) Bruno Berner (9 June 2023 – 9 April 2024)
- (Switzerland) Marco Schällibaum (10 April 2024 – 5 November 2024)
- (Switzerland) Giuseppe Morello (5 November 2024 – 19 November 2024) (caretaker)
- (Germany) Tomas Oral (19 November 2024 – 1 July 2025)
- (Austria) Gerald Scheiblehner (1 July 2025 – 16 March 2026)
- (Austria) Gernot Messner (16 March 2026 – 1 May 2026) (caretaker)
- (Germany) Peter Zeidler (1 May 2026 – 21 September 2026)
- (Germany) Olaf Janßen (3 October 2026 – present)

== Organisation ==
As of 7 September 2026

Board of Directors
| Position | Name | Since |
|---|---|---|
| President | (Switzerland) Ludovic Deléchat | 06/2026 |
| Vice-president | (Switzerland) András Gurovits | 07/2023 |
Management
| Chief Executive Officer | (Switzerland) Richard Feuz | 07/2026 |
| Head of Finance | (Switzerland) Roland Gebhard | 02/2023 |
| Chief Business Officer | Leo Lian | 04/2026 |

== See also ==
- History of Grasshopper Club Zurich
- Grasshopper Club Zurich in European football
- Zurich Derby
- Hardturm and Letzigrund
