= Zoltán Kádár =

Romanian footballer and coach

Personal information
- Date of birth: 4 October 1966 (age 60)
- Place of birth: Ozun, Romania
- Height: 1.80 m (5 ft 11 in)
- Position: Right midfielder

Team information
- Current team: Young Boys (assistant)

Youth career
- Tractorul Brașov
- 1984–1985: FCM Brașov

Senior career*
Years	Team	Apps	(Gls)
1985–1987	FCM Brașov	66	(7)
1987–1991	Universitatea Cluj	123	(19)
1991–1995	Dinamo București	135	(16)
1996	Universitatea Cluj	13	(0)
1996–2000	Schaffhausen	134	(5)
2000–2005	Frauenfeld		
Total		471	(47)

International career
1986–1987	Romania U21	4	(1)
1990–1994	Romania	8	(0)

Managerial career
- 2000–2005: Frauenfeld (player/coach)
- 2005–2011: Winterthur U18
- 2011–2012: Grasshopper U18
- 2012–2017: Grasshopper (assistant)
- 2015: Grasshopper (caretaker)
- 2017–2019: FC Zürich (assistant)
- 2019–2020: Grasshopper (assistant)
- 2020: Grasshopper (caretaker)
- 2020–2021: Grasshopper (assistant)
- 2021: Grasshopper (caretaker)
- 2021–2022: Grasshopper (head of academy)
- 2022–: Young Boys (assistant)
- * Club domestic league appearances and goals

Zoltán Kádár (born 4 October 1966) is a Romanian former professional footballer who serves as an assistant for Swiss Super League club Young Boys.

== Club career ==
Kádár, of Hungarian ethnicity, was born on 4 October 1966 in Ozun, Romania and began playing junior-level football in Brașov for local club Tractorul. In 1984 he joined FC Brașov where he won the junior republican championship in 1985 and also made his senior Divizia A debut. In 1987, he enrolled at the Babeș-Bolyai University, subsequently playing for the university's club Universitatea Cluj.

In 1991, Kádár was signed by Dinamo București on the initiative of the club's president Vasile Ianul for a fee of $30,000. Kádár spent four years at Dinamo and helped the club win the 1991–92 Divizia A title undefeated, being used by coach Florin Halagian in 29 games in which he scored one goal. He also made 14 appearances in European competitions, including playing in Dinamo's 2–1 victory on aggregate against Luis Figo's Sporting Lisbon in the 1991–92 UEFA Cup. Subsequently, he played all four games in the 1992–93 Champions League campaign, helping them eliminate Kuusysi Lahti in the first round of the 1992–93 Champions League. Dinamo faced Olympique Marseille in the second round, where they drew 0–0 in the first leg but lost the subsequent game with 2–0, the French ultimately winning the competition.

In January 1996, Kádár returned to Universitatea Cluj for a brief period, and he eventually retired at the end of the season and opened a restaurant in Gherla. However, he was approached by former Dinamo teammate, Gábor Gerstenmájer, who then played in Switzerland, and Kádár accepted the offer to play for his team, Schaffhausen. He spent four seasons before in 2000 the club got relegated and he switched to fourth division team Frauenfeld as a player-coach. In his second season in Frauenfeld, the club won promotion to the third division. Kádár retired from his playing career in 2005 and subsequently became a youth coach at Winterthur U18.

== International career ==
Kádár played seven friendly games for Romania, making his debut on 17 April 1991 when coach Mircea Rădulescu sent him in the 87th minute to replace Gabi Balint in a 2–0 away victory against Spain. His last game for the national team was on 13 February 1994 in a 2–1 victory against the United States.

== Managerial career ==
=== Grasshopper Club Zürich ===
After over six years coaching the Winterthur youth teams, he was hired by Grasshopper Club Zürich as their U18 coach. In the following year, he became the assistant of head coach of the first team, Uli Forte, and helped the club to achieve their first title after ten years, with the 2012–13 Swiss Cup. After Forte's departure, he remained assistant coach for Michael Skibbe (2013–2015), Pierluigi Tami (2015–2017), and Carlos Bernegger (2017). He also took over as interim coach briefly in early 2015, between Skibbe's departure and Tami's appointment.

=== FC Zürich ===
In July 2017, he joined city rivals FC Zürich as assistant and forward coach, as well as video analyst, joining up again with Uli Forte. He remained at FC Zürich after Forte's departure in 2018 and continued serving as assistant of incoming manager Ludovic Magnin until April 2019.

=== Grasshopper Club (second stint) ===
During the 2018–19 season, Grasshopper were struggling badly and found themselves at the bottom of the league. On 10 April 2019, Kadar was hired to once again assist Uli Forte to mitigate the disaster that was the 2018–19 Grasshopper season. Sadly, the cup winning coaching team could not avoid relegation and accompanied the club to the Swiss Challenge League for the following season. Kadar remained as assistant to incoming manager Goran Djuricin in February 2020. He became interim coach in May 2020 at the tail end of the season, after Djuricin was terminated when promotion became very unlikely.

For the following season, João Carlos Pereira was appointed as head coach and Kadar become his assistant until November 2020, when he was appointed head of the training of the GC academy. When Grasshoppers were in danger of missing promotion again, Pereira was terminated in May 2021 and Kadar took up the caretaker role for the third time. He successfully led the team to promotion back to the Swiss Super League.

Despite this success, he returned to managing the GC academy after the end of the season.

=== Young Boys ===
On 14 June 2022, he departed Grasshopper to join BSC Young Boys as assistant coach to Raphaël Wicky.

== Playing statistics ==
Appearances and goals by national team and year
National team	Year	Apps	Goals
Romania	1990	1	0
Romania	1991	4	0
Romania	1992	1	0
Romania	1993	1	0
Romania	1994	1	0
Total		8	0

== Honours ==
=== Player ===
Dinamo București

- Divizia A: 1991–92

=== Coach ===
Grasshopper

- Swiss Challenge League: 2020–21
