= 2019 Algarve Cup =

International women's football tournament

Tournament details
- Host country: Portugal
- Dates: 27 February – 6 March
- Teams: 12 (from 3 confederations)

Final positions
- Champions: Norway (5th title)
- Runners-up: Poland
- Third place: Canada
- Fourth place: Sweden

Tournament statistics
- Matches played: 16
- Goals scored: 42 (2.63 per match)
- Top scorer(s): (Spain) Jennifer Hermoso (Sweden) Mimmi Larsson (3 goals)

The 2019 Algarve Cup was the 26th edition of the Algarve Cup, an invitational women's football tournament held annually in Portugal. It took place from 27 February to 6 March.

Norway defeated Poland 3–0 in the final to win their fifth title, and their first since the 1998 edition.

== Format ==
The twelve invited teams were split into four groups to play a round-robin tournament.

Points awarded in the group stage followed the standard formula of three points for a win, one point for a draw and zero points for a loss. In the case of two teams being tied on the same number of points in a group, their head-to-head result determine the higher place.

== Teams ==
Team	FIFA Rankings (December 2018)
Canada	5
Netherlands	7
Sweden	9
Spain	12
Norway	13
China	15
Denmark	17
Switzerland	18
Scotland	20
Iceland	22
Portugal	32
Poland	34

== Group stage ==
The groups were announced in mid-January 2019

All times are local (UTC±0).

=== Tie-breaking criteria ===
For the group stage of this tournament, where two or more teams in a group tied on an equal number of points, the finishing positions were determined by the following tie-breaking criteria in the following order:

1. number of points obtained in the matches among the teams in question
2. goal difference in all the group matches
3. number of goals scored in all the group matches
4. fair-play ranking in all the group matches
5. FIFA ranking

=== Group A ===
Pos	Team	Pld	W	D	L	GF	GA	GD	Pts
1	Canada	2	1	1	0	1	0	+1	4
2	Scotland	2	1	0	1	4	2	+2	3
3	Iceland	2	0	1	1	1	4	−3	1

Source: FPT
Rules for classification: Tiebreakers
27 February 2019
13:15

Canada	0–0	Iceland
	Report

Bela Vista Municipal Stadium, Parchal

1 March 2019
13:15

Scotland	0–1	Canada
	Report	Sinclair 81' (pen.)

Lagos Municipal Stadium, Lagos

4 March 2019
14:00

Iceland	1–4	Scotland
Gunnarsdóttir 57'	Report	Arnot 13', 66'; Cuthbert 32'; Little 55'

Bela Vista Municipal Stadium, Parchal

=== Group B ===
Pos	Team	Pld	W	D	L	GF	GA	GD	Pts
1	Poland	2	2	0	0	4	0	+4	6
2	Spain	2	1	0	1	2	3	−1	3
3	Netherlands	2	0	0	2	0	3	−3	0

Source: FPT
Rules for classification: Tiebreakers
27 February 2019
17:15

Spain	2–0	Netherlands
Hermoso 22', 64'	Report

Bela Vista Municipal Stadium, Parchal
Referee: Marie-Soleil Beaudoin (Canada)

1 March 2019
16:45

Poland	3–0	Spain
Dudek 25'; Balcerzak 34'; Pajor 49'	Report

Lagos Municipal Stadium, Lagos
Referee: Lucila Venegas (Mexico)

4 March 2019
17:30

Netherlands	0–1	Poland
	Report	Winczo 42'

Bela Vista Municipal Stadium, Parchal

=== Group C ===
Pos	Team	Pld	W	D	L	GF	GA	GD	Pts
1	Norway	2	2	0	0	5	2	+3	6
2	Denmark	2	1	0	1	2	2	0	3
3	China	2	0	0	2	1	4	−3	0

Updated to match(es) played on 4 March 2019. Source: FPT
Rules for classification: Tiebreakers
27 February 2019
13:15

Norway	2–1	Denmark
Åsland 77'; Utland 90'	Report	Nadim 17'

Estádio Algarve

1 March 2019
13:15

China	1–3	Norway
Wang 90'	Report	Herlovsen 9'; Wu 31' (o.g.); Haavi 42'

Albufeira Municipal Stadium, Albufeira

4 March 2019
13:15

Denmark	1–0	China
Harder 60' (pen.)

VRS António Sports Complex, Vila Real de Santo António

=== Group D ===
Pos	Team	Pld	W	D	L	GF	GA	GD	Pts
1	Sweden	2	1	0	1	5	3	+2	3
2	Switzerland	2	1	0	1	4	5	−1	3
3	Portugal (H)	2	1	0	1	3	4	−1	3

Source: FPT
Rules for classification: Tiebreakers
(H) Hosts
27 February 2019
16:45

Sweden	4–1	Switzerland
Larsson 7', 40', 67'; Asllani 62'	Report	Crnogorčević 26'

Estádio Algarve
Referee: Laura Fortunato (Argentina)

1 March 2019
16:45

Portugal	2–1	Sweden
Silva 71'; Neto 90+4'	Report	Björn 68'

Albufeira Municipal Stadium, Albufeira
Referee: María Belén Carvajal (Chile)

4 March 2019
16:45

Switzerland	3–1	Portugal
Crnogorčević 60'; Kiwic 66'; Müller 86'	Report	Norton 27'

VRS António Sports Complex, Vila Real de Santo António

=== Ranking of teams for placement matches ===
The ranking of the 1st, 2nd, and 3rd placed teams in each group to determine the placement matches:

- 1st placed teams

Pos	Grp	Team	Pld	W	D	L	GF	GA	GD	Pts	Qualification
1	B	Poland	2	2	0	0	4	0	+4	6	Final
2	C	Norway	2	2	0	0	5	2	+3	6	Final
3	A	Canada	2	1	1	0	1	0	+1	4	Third-place match
4	D	Sweden	2	1	0	1	5	3	+2	3	Third-place match

Source: FPT
- 2nd placed teams

Pos	Grp	Team	Pld	W	D	L	GF	GA	GD	Pts	Qualification
1	A	Scotland	2	1	0	1	4	2	+2	3	Fifth-place match
2	C	Denmark	2	1	0	1	2	2	0	3	Fifth-place match
3	D	Switzerland	2	1	0	1	4	5	−1	3	Seventh-place match
4	B	Spain	2	1	0	1	2	3	−1	3	Seventh-place match

Source: FPT
- 3rd placed teams

Pos	Grp	Team	Pld	W	D	L	GF	GA	GD	Pts	Qualification
1	D	Portugal	2	1	0	1	3	4	−1	3	Ninth-place match
2	A	Iceland	2	0	1	1	1	4	−3	1	Ninth-place match
3	C	China	2	0	0	2	1	4	−3	0	Eleventh-place match
4	B	Netherlands	2	0	0	2	0	3	−3	0	Eleventh-place match

Source: FPT

== Placement matches ==
=== Eleventh place ===
6 March 2019
17:15

China	1–1	Netherlands
Yao 50'	Report	Miedema 45'
Penalties
Zhang (penalty missed); Yao (penalty scored); Li (penalty scored); Wu (penalty missed)	2–4	(penalty scored) Van de Donk; (penalty scored) Van Dongen; (penalty scored) Bloodworth; (penalty missed) Spitse; (penalty scored) Miedema

Albufeira Municipal Stadium, Albufeira

=== Ninth place ===
6 March 2019
14:30

Portugal	1–4	Iceland
Mendes 88'	Report	Albertsdóttir 2'; Magnúsdóttir 37'; Viðarsdóttir 89'; Guðmundsdóttir 90'

Bela Vista Municipal Stadium, Parchal
Referee: Lydia Abede (Ethiopia)

=== Seventh place ===
6 March 2019
13:15

Switzerland	0–2	Spain
	Report	Hermoso 21'; Müller 63' (o.g.)

Albufeira Municipal Stadium, Albufeira
Referee: María Belén Carvajal (Chile)

=== Fifth place ===
6 March 2019
13:15

Scotland	1–0	Denmark
Ross 34'	Report

Estádio Algarve

=== Third place ===
6 March 2019
17:00

Canada	0–0	Sweden
	Report
Penalties
Schmidt (penalty scored); Sinclair (penalty missed); Rose (penalty scored); Lawrence (penalty scored); Beckie (penalty scored); Buchanan (penalty scored); Fleming (penalty scored)	6–5	(penalty scored) Anvegård; (penalty scored) Sembrant; (penalty scored) Björn; (penalty missed) Larsson; (penalty scored) Jakobsson; (penalty scored) Ericsson; (penalty missed) Glas

Estádio Algarve

=== Final ===
6 March 2019
18:00

Poland	0–3	Norway
	Report	Herlovsen 24'; Hansen 65'; Sævik 74'

Bela Vista Municipal Stadium, Parchal

== Final standings ==
Rank	Team
1st place, gold medalist(s)	Norway
2nd place, silver medalist(s)	Poland
3rd place, bronze medalist(s)	Canada
4	Sweden
5	Scotland
6	Denmark
7	Spain
8	Switzerland
9	Iceland
10	Portugal
11	Netherlands
12	China

== Goalscorers ==
There have been 42 goals scored in 16 matches, for an average of 2.62 goals per match.

3 goals

- (Spain) Jennifer Hermoso
- (Sweden) Mimmi Larsson

2 goals

- (Norway) Isabell Herlovsen
- (Scotland) Lizzie Arnot
- (Switzerland) Ana-Maria Crnogorčević

1 goal

- (Canada) Christine Sinclair
- (China) Wang Shanshan
- (China) Yao Wei
- (Denmark) Pernille Harder
- (Denmark) Nadia Nadim
- (Iceland) Agla María Albertsdóttir
- (Iceland) Sara Björk Gunnarsdóttir
- (Iceland) Svava Rós Guðmundsdóttir
- (Iceland) Selma Sól Magnúsdóttir
- (Iceland) Margrét Lára Viðarsdóttir
- (Netherlands) Vivianne Miedema
- (Norway) Therese Sessy Åsland
- (Norway) Emilie Haavi
- (Norway) Caroline Graham Hansen
- (Norway) Karina Sævik
- (Norway) Lisa-Marie Karlseng Utland
- (Poland) Patrycja Balcerzak
- (Poland) Paulina Dudek
- (Poland) Ewa Pajor
- (Poland) Agnieszka Winczo
- (Portugal) Mónica Mendes
- (Portugal) Cláudia Neto
- (Portugal) Andreia Norton
- (Portugal) Dolores Silva
- (Scotland) Erin Cuthbert
- (Scotland) Kim Little
- (Scotland) Jane Ross
- (Sweden) Kosovare Asllani
- (Sweden) Nathalie Björn
- (Switzerland) Rahel Kiwic
- (Switzerland) Melanie Müller

1 own goal

- (China) Wu Haiyan (against Norway)
- (Switzerland) Melanie Müller (against Spain)
