= History of Grasshopper Club Zurich =

Logo of Grasshopper Club Zürich

Grasshopper Club Zürich, commonly referred to as GC, GCZ, or Grasshoppers, is a professional sports club based in Zurich, Switzerland. Founded on September 1, 1886, it is the second oldest active football club in Zurich after FC St. Gallen, based in Gallen. With 27 Swiss Super League and 19 Swiss Cup titles, Grasshoppers remains the most successful club in the country. Grasshoppers host their domestic matches at Stadion Letzigrund since the 2007/2008 season.

== Early history ==
=== Foundation and first championship wins ===
Grasshopper was founded on 1 September 1886 by Tom E. Griffith, an English student.

The first Swiss championships (then called "Serie A") were held in 1897–98 and were won by Grasshopper, as was the first championship played using a league system in 1899–1900.

== New Era: Incorporation ==
With title wins in 2000–01 and 2002–03, the first decade of the 21st century started well, but since then no further successes were achieved. In 1997, Grasshopper was incorporated and as of May 2005, it is formally organized as Neue Grasshopper Fussball AG. In doing so, Grasshopper became the first Swiss sports club to go public.

=== 19th Cup Title ===
For the 2012/13 season, Ulrich Forte took over coaching. On 20 May 2013, Grasshopper ended a ten-year trophy drought with a penalty shoot-out victory over Basel in the Swiss Cup final at the Stade de Suisse in Bern. With a second-place finish in the 2012–13 Swiss Super League campaign, Grasshopper qualified for the Champions League for the first time in a decade, entering the competition at the third qualifying round.

=== Decline ===
The team's positive results were soon on the decline again. In the following five years, they managed to only once finish in the upper half of the table and finally, in 2019, Grasshopper were relegated to the second division for the first time in 68 years. They spend the entire 2018/19 season in the bottom three of the league, ending their season with two abandoned matches due to misbehavior by Grasshopper fans.

== Recent History: Foreign ownership ==
=== Chinese Owners and Promotion ===
The first season in the second league did not go as planned. For one, due to the COVID-19 pandemic, the second half of the season was delayed until late spring 2020. Furthermore, GC failed to even achieve a second-place finish, which would have qualified them for a playoff game for promotion, after losing the final game of the season 0–6 against Winterthur. During this time, in April 2020, it was revealed that the Hong Kong-based Champion Union HK Holding Limited had acquired 90% of GC shares. The new ownership appointed Sky Sun as the president of the club. In April 2021, Seyi Olofinjana was signed as sporting director.

=== Return to the Super League ===
For the first season back in the top Swiss league, former Lausanne coach Giorgio Contini was signed as head coach.

During preparation for the new season, sporting director Olofinjana and CEO Shqiprim Berisha were removed from management. President Sun would take over CEO duties in the interim. On 1 July 2022, Grasshopper veteran Bernt Haas was appointed as new sporting director. On 13 February 2023, Sun stepped down from his positions as president and CEO, with vice-president András Gurovits taking up the mantle in the interim.

On 19 March 2023, Swiss online news site nau.ch reported that coach Contini had handed in his resignation in mid February, which would see him leaving the club in the summer, following a six-month notice period. On the same day, the club confirmed the news and stating their intention of continuing their cooperation for the duration of the season. On 9 June 2023, following the conclusion of the season, Bruno Berner was announced as the new head coach for the 2023–24 season. He signed a two-year contract with GC. Berner had graduated from the Grasshoppers academy in 1997 and played for the first team until 2002, winning two Swiss championships in that time (1998 and 2001).

On 30 June, former Premier League player Matt Jackson was appointed as the new president of GC. Jackson had most recently acted as "strategic player marketing manager" at partner club Wolverhampton Wanderers.

=== New Owners and Relegation Scare ===
On 17 January 2024, a long-term partnership with MLS side Los Angeles FC was announced, with LAFC acquiring over 90% of the shares from the previous owners, Champion Union. In a press conference at the historic Grasshoppers rowing club, Gurovits presented the new interim president Stacy Johns, who is also the COO and CFO of LAFC. LAFC's Larry Freedman was also in attendance, as was their new managing director of Europe, Harald Gärtner. Gärtner will take up an advisory role in the club. On 27 March 2024, Haas was replaced as sporting director by Stephan Schwarz.

Following the takeover, the clubs results declined sharply. Of the first 13 games in 2024, only two wins were achieved (both of these were against fierce rivals, FC Zurich and Basel). As a result, Berner was dismissed as coach on 9 April 2024, after nearly two months without a win. A day later, Marco Schällibaum was confirmed as new head coach.

In the first leg of the play-off at home, the team conceded at the start of the second half, they spent the rest of the game chasing an equalizer. After 19 corners won and nearly 70% possession, they were awarded a penalty by the VAR in overtime. This penalty was converted by Giotto Morandi, meaning that they would go into the away fixture with a 1–1 aggregate score. In the second leg, they started well, with Morandi scoring two minutes into the game.
