= Grasshopper Club Zurich (women) =

Grasshopper Club
- Full name: Grasshopper Club Zürich Frauen
- Founded: 1974 / 2008 / 2009
- Ground: GC/Campus, Niederhasli, Zürich
- Capacity: 1,300
- Owner: CV.Gatrav
- Chairman: Heinz Spross
- Manager: Anne Pochert
- League: Swiss Women's Super League
- 2025–26: Swiss Women's Super League 4th of 10
- Website: http://www.gc-frauen.ch
| Home colours | Away colours |

Grasshopper Club Zurich Frauen is a Swiss women's football team from Niederhasli, Zurich representing Grasshopper Club Zurich in the Swiss Women's Super League.

== History ==
The team was founded in 1977 in Schwerzenbach, Zurich, as DFC Schwerzenbach, the women's football division of SC Schwerzenbach. The team achieved promotion to the top level in 1988 and has played there since. Three years later Schwerzenbach won its first trophy, the 1992 national cup, and in 1999 it won the championship. FFC Bern prevented a double defeating Schwerzenbach in the cup's final in a penalty shootout.

While the team's standings subsequently ranged between the 3rd and second-to-last spots, Schwerzenbach won two more national cups in 2003 and 2008 and represented Switzerland in the 2004 European Cup. In 2006, the team decided to become its own club and on 6 October 2006, FFC United Schwerzenbach was founded in Greifensee, Zurich.

In May 2008, the club won its first title, with the cup victory over FFC Bern. Soon after, in June 2008, the collaboration between Grasshopper Club Zurich and FFC United Schwerzenbach was announced and in the following season the team played as GC/Schwerzenbach. This collaboration was seen as a quantum leap in women's football in Switzerland. GC/Schwerzenbach was dissolved a year later, as the team became fully integrated into Grasshopper Club as the women's football division. They would play under the name Grasshopper Club Zurich.

Following a bronze in its debut season, Grasshopper was the championship's runner-up in 2010. In the three next seasons it has ended in mid-table positions.

On 4 September 2023, the club decided to incorporate their women's football team under the name GC Frauenfussball AG.

== Titles ==
- Swiss League (1)
  - 1999
- Swiss Cup (3)
  - 1992, 2003, 2008

== Current squad ==
As of 1 October 2025

Note: Flags indicate national team as defined under FIFA eligibility rules; some limited exceptions apply. Players may hold more than one non-FIFA nationality.

| No. | Pos. | Nation | Player |
|---|---|---|---|
| 1 | GK | SUI | Isabel Rutishauser |
| 4 | MF | SUI | Victoria Laino |
| 6 | DF | SUI | Luna Lempérière (captain) |
| 7 | FW | SUI | Janina Egli |
| 8 | MF | CRO | Ella Ljuština |
| 9 | MF | ALB | Qendresa Krasniqi |
| 10 | MF | SUI | Yllka Kadriu |
| 11 | FW | AUT | Noémie Potier |
| 12 | FW | JAM | Kayla McKenna |
| 13 | DF | SUI | Leandra Flury |
| 14 | FW | ITA | Nicole Arcangeli |
| 15 | MF | ESP | Marta Cazalla |
| 16 | FW | SUI | Emanuela Pfister |
| 17 | MF | SUI | Yade Bayrakdar |
| 18 | DF | SUI | Luana Valsangiacomo |
| 19 | FW | SUI | Ramona Kannady |
| 20 | MF | MAR | Imane Touriss |

| No. | Pos. | Nation | Player |
|---|---|---|---|
| 21 | DF | SUI | Emma Egli |
| 22 | DF | FRA | Morgane Nicoli |
| 23 | DF | SUI | Viola Avduli |
| 24 | MF | SUI | Giulia Looser |
| 25 | MF | FRA | Landryna Lushimba Bilombi |
| 26 | MF | SUI | Laura Kott |
| 27 | DF | SUI | Melanie Müller |
| 28 | FW | SLO | Nina Predanič |
| 29 | DF | SUI | Valentina Gerlof |
| 30 | MF | POR | Rita Almeida |
| 32 | MF | GER | Michelle Storni |
| 33 | MF | SUI | Rebecca Villena |
| 35 | DF | GER | Laeticia Tyla |
| 41 | GK | SUI | Yara Zwyssig |
| 90 | FW | ARG | Dalila Ippólito |
| 99 | GK | USA | Lauren Kozal |

=== International players ===
Former Grasshopper Club Zurich players in italic

- Switzerland: Malin Gut, Caroline Müller, Marina Keller, Sheila Lossli, Bea Mettler, Isabelle Meyer, Jasmin Schnyder, Daniela Schwarz, Selina Zumbühl, Manuela Zürcher, Rachel Rinast, Melanie Müller
- Germany: Anna Blässe
- China: Zhang Linyan
- Hungary: Emőke Pápai
- Croatia: Ana Maria Marković
- Slovenia: Nina Predanič
- Lithuania: Ugnė Lazdauskaitė
- Argentina: Dalila Ippólito

== Competition record ==
=== UEFA record ===
| Season | Competition | Stage | Result | Opponent | Scorers |
|---|---|---|---|---|---|
| 2003–04 | UEFA Women's Cup | Group Stage | 1–5; 4–4; 1–1 | (Azerbaijan) Gömrükçü Baku (Greece) AE Aegina (Belarus) FC Bobruichanka | Soltermann; Hügli 2, Schwarz, Zumbühl; Hügli |

=== Overall record ===
| Season | Division | Position | Swiss Cup | Champions League |
|---|---|---|---|---|
| 1977–78 | 2 (Gr. 2) | 6 / 8 | ? | |
| 1978–79 | 2 | ? | ? | |
| 1979–80 | 2 (Gr. 3) | 8 / 9 | ? | |
| 1980–81 | 2 (Gr. 1) | 7 / 8 | ? | |
| 1981–82 | 2 | ? | ? | |
| 1982–83 | 2 | ? | ? | |
| 1983–84 | 2 (Gr. 1) | 4 / 8 | ? | |
| 1984–85 | 2 (Gr. 1) | 8 / 10 | ? | |
| 1985–86 | 2 (Gr. 1) | 5 / 10 | ? | |
| 1986–87 | 2 (Gr. 1) | 7 / 10 | ? | |
| 1987–88 | 2 (Gr. 1) | 1 / 10 | ? | |
| 1988–89 | 1 | 5 / 10 | ? | |
| 1989–90 | 1 | 4 / 10 | ? | |
| 1990–91 | 1 | 3 / 6 | ? | |
| 1991–92 | 1 | 3 / 6 | ? | |
| 1992–93 | 1 | 3 / 6 | ? | |
| 1993–94 | 1 | 3 / 6 | ? | |
| 1994–95 | 1 | 4 / 6 | ? | |
| 1995–96 | 1 | 4 / 10 | ? | |
| 1996–97 | 1 | 7 / 10 | ? | |
| 1997–98 | 1 | 4 / 10 | ? | |
| 1998–99 | 1 | 1 / 10 | Finalist | |
| 1999–00 | 1 | 4 / 10 | Finalist | |
| 2000–01 | 1 | 4 / 10 | Round of 16 | |
| 2001–02 | 1 | 4 / 10 | Round of 16 | |
| 2002–03 | 1 | 3 / 10 | Champion | |
| 2003–04 | 1 | 5 / 10 | Semifinals | Group stage |
| 2004–05 | 1 | 7 / 8 | Round of 32 | |
| 2005–06 | 1 | 3 / 8 | Quarterfinals | |
| 2006–07 | 1 | 6 / 8 | Semifinals | |
| 2007–08 | 1 | 5 / 8 | Champion | |
| 2008–09 | 1 | 3 / 10 | Quarterfinals | |
| 2009–10 | 1 | 2 / 10 | Round of 16 | |
| 2010–11 | 1 | 5 / 10 | Round of 16 | |
| 2011–12 | 1 | 5 / 10 | Round of 32 | |
| 2012–13 | 1 | 6 / 10 | Round of 16 | |
| 2013–14 | 1 | 9 / 10 | Round of 16 | |
| 2014–15 | 1 | 9 / 10 | Round of 16 | |
| 2015–16 | 1 | 6 / 10 | Quarterfinals | |
| 2016–17 | 1 | 7 / 10 | Round of 16 | |
| 2017–18 | 1 | 5 / 8 | Round of 16 | |
| 2018–19 | 1 | 3 / 8 | Semifinals | |
| 2019–20 | 1 | Abandoned (Note: Due to COVID-19) | | |
| 2020–21 | 1 | 5 / 8 | Semifinals | |
| 2021–22 | 1 | 3 / 8 | Finalist | |
| 2022–23 | 1 | 3 / 8 | Quarterfinals | |
