= Bea Mettler =

Swiss footballer (born 1978)

Bea Metzger-Mettler
Personal information
- Full name: Beatrice Metzger-Mettler
- Date of birth: 23 July 1978 (age 48)
- Place of birth: Switzerland
- Positions: Midfielder; forward

International career
Years	Team	Apps	(Gls)
- Switzerland

Bea Metzger-Mettler is a retired Swiss footballer who played for FC St. Gallen, FC Schwerzenbach and the Swiss national team. In 2000, Mettler was voted Swiss player of the year. Since retiring, Mettler has taken up football coaching.
