= Daniela Schwarz =

Swiss footballer (born 1985)

Personal information
- Full name: Daniela Regula Schwarz
- Date of birth: 9 September 1985 (age 41)
- Height: 1.67 m (5 ft 6 in)
- Position: Defender

Youth career
- 1996–2001: FC Seuzach
- 2001–2006: FC Schwerzenbach
- 2005–2006: Lindsey Wilson College

Senior career*
Years	Team	Apps	(Gls)
2006	F.C. Indiana		
2007	Toronto Lady Lynx		
2007–2009	GC/Schwerzenbach		
2009–2012	Grasshopper	26	(2)
2012–2013	Kolbotn	25	(9)
2014–2015	Vålerenga	27	(0)

International career^{‡}
2009–2015	Switzerland	23	(1)
- * Club domestic league appearances and goals as of 13:46, 5 June 2015 (UTC) ‡ National team caps and goals as of 20:51, 23 June 2015 (UTC)

Daniela Regula Schwarz (born 9 September 1985) is a Swiss former footballer who played as a defender. She previously played for Grasshopper Club Zürich of the Nationalliga A. Since her debut in July 2009, a 5–0 defeat by the Netherlands, she has been a member of the Switzerland national team.

A product of the America college soccer system, Schwarz attended Lindsey Wilson and also played in the North American W-League for F.C. Indiana and Toronto Lady Lynx. After returning to Switzerland and playing for Grasshopper Club Zürich, she moved to Norway in 2012 with Kolbotn.
