= Grasshopper Club Zurich in European football =

Grasshopper Club Zurich, commonly referred to as simply GC, GCZ, or Grasshoppers, is a multisports club based in Zürich, Switzerland and its football division is the most successful club in Switzerland, with a record 27 league titles, a record 19 cup championships, eight doubles, two league cup wins, and one Super Cup victory.

GC has to date never won any European championship, but has competed in numerous European cups throughout its existence. Despite the lack of international success, the team has made waves on some occasions with victories over teams such as Ajax Amsterdam or the Glasgow Rangers.

== Best Placements ==
Competition	Year	Stage Reached	Last Opponent
UEFA Champions League	1996-97	Group Stage (3rd)	(France) Auxerre, (Netherlands) Ajax, (Scotland) Rangers
UEFA Champions League	1995-96	Group Stage (4th)	(Netherlands) Ajax, (Spain) Real Madrid, (Hungary) Ferencváros
European Cup	1978-79	Quarter-finals	(England) Nottingham Forest
European Cup	1984–85	Round of 16	(Italy) Juventus
UEFA Cup	1977-78	Semi-finals	(France) Bastia
UEFA Cup	1980-81	Quarter-final	(France) Sochaux
UEFA Cup	1979-80	Round of 16	(Germany) Stuttgart
UEFA Cup	1998-99	Round of 16	(France) Bordeaux
European Cup Winners' Cup	1989-90	Quarter-finals	(Italy) Sampdoria
UEFA Cup Winners' Cup	1994-95	Round of 16	(Italy) Sampdoria

Last updated: 23 June 2022
Source: Palmares

== Detailed Results ==
=== 1956–1970 ===
Season	Competition	Round	Opponent	Home	Away	Series
1956–57	European Cup	R1	(Czechoslovakia) Slovan UNV Bratislava	2–0	0–1	2–1
1956–57	European Cup	QF	(Italy) Fiorentina	2–2	1–3	3–5
1968–69	Inter-Cities Fairs Cup	R1	(Italy) Napoli	1–0	1–3	2–3

=== 1970–1980 ===
Season	Competition	Round	Opponent	Home	Away	Series
1970–71	Inter-Cities Fairs Cup	R1	(Scotland) Dundee United	0–0	2–3	2–3
1971–72	European Cup	R1	(Finland) Reipas Lahti	8–0	1–1	9–1
1971–72	European Cup	R2	(England) Arsenal	0–2	0–3	0–5
1972–73	UEFA Cup	R1	(France) Nîmes	2–1	2–1	4–2
1972–73	UEFA Cup	R2	(Soviet Union) Ararat Yerevan	1–3	2–4	3–7
1973–74	UEFA Cup	R1	(England) Tottenham Hotspur	1–5	1–4	2–9
1974–75	UEFA Cup	R1	(Greece) Panathinaikos	2–0	1–2	3–2
1974–75	UEFA Cup	R2	(Spain) Real Zaragoza	2–1	0–5	2–6
1975–76	UEFA Cup	R1	(Spain) Real Sociedad	3–3	1–1	4–4 (a)
1976–77	UEFA Cup	R1	(Malta) Hibernians	7–0	2–0	9–0
1976–77	UEFA Cup	R2	(West Germany) Köln	2–3	0–2	2–5
1977–78	UEFA Cup	R1	(Denmark) BK Frem	6–1	2–0	8–1
1977–78	UEFA Cup	R2	(Czechoslovakia) TJ Internacionál	5–1	0–1	5–2
1977–78	UEFA Cup	R3	(Soviet Union) Dinamo Tbilisi	4–0	0–1	4–1
1977–78	UEFA Cup	QF	(West Germany) Eintracht Frankfurt	1–0	2–3	3–3 (a)
1977–78	UEFA Cup	SF	(France) Bastia	3–2	0–1	3–3 (a)
1978–79	European Cup	R1	(Malta) Valletta	8–0	5–3	13–3
1978–79	European Cup	R2	(Spain) Real Madrid	2–0	1–3	3–3 (a)
1978–79	European Cup	QF	(England) Nottingham Forest	1–1	1–4	2–4
1979–80	UEFA Cup	R1	(Luxembourg) Progrès Niedercorn	4–0	2–0	6–0
1979–80	UEFA Cup	R2	(England) Ipswich Town	0–0	1–1	1–1 (a)
1979–80	UEFA Cup	R3	(West Germany) Stuttgart	0–2	0–3	0–5

=== 1980–1990 ===
Season	Competition	Round	Opponent	Home	Away	Series
1980–81	UEFA Cup	R1	(Denmark) KB	3–1	5–2	8–3
1980–81	UEFA Cup	R2	(Portugal) Porto	3–0 (a.e.t.)	0–2	3–2
1980–81	UEFA Cup	R3	(Italy) Torino	2–1	1–2	3–3 (p)
1980–81	UEFA Cup	QF	(France) Sochaux	0–0	1–2	1–2
1981–82	UEFA Cup	R1	(England) West Bromwich Albion	1–1	3–1	4–1
1981–82	UEFA Cup	R2	(Socialist Federal Republic of Yugoslavia) Radnički Niš	2–0	0–2	2–2 (p)
1982–83	European Cup	R1	(Soviet Union) Dynamo Kyiv	0–1	0–3	0–4
1983–84	European Cup	R1	(Soviet Union) Dinamo Minsk	2–2	0–1	2–3
1984–85	European Cup	R1	(Hungary) Budapest Honvéd	3–1	1–2	4–3
1984–85	European Cup	R2	(Italy) Juventus	2–4	0–2	2–6
1987–88	UEFA Cup	R1	(Soviet Union) Dynamo Moscow	0–4	0–1	0–5
1988–89	Cup Winners' Cup	R1	(West Germany) Eintracht Frankfurt	0–0	0–1	0–1
1989–90	Cup Winners' Cup	R1	(Slovakia) Slovan Bratislava	0–3	4–0 (a.e.t.)	4–3
1989–90	Cup Winners' Cup	R2	(Soviet Union) Torpedo Moscow	3–0	1–1	4–1
1989–90	Cup Winners' Cup	QF	(Italy) Sampdoria	0–2	1–2	1–4

=== 1990–2000 ===
Season	Competition	Round	Opponent	Home	Away	Series
1990–91	European Cup	R1	(Socialist Federal Republic of Yugoslavia) Red Star Belgrade	1–4	1–1	2–5
1991–92	European Cup	R1	(Belgium) RSC Anderlecht	0–3	1–1	1–4
1992–93	UEFA Cup	R1	(Portugal) Sporting CP	1–2	3–1 (a.e.t.)	4–3
1992–93	UEFA Cup	R2	(Italy) AS Roma	4–3	0–3	4–6
1994–95	UEFA Cup Winners' Cup	R1	(Ukraine) Chornomorets Odesa	3–0	0–1	3–1
1994–95	UEFA Cup Winners' Cup	R2	(Italy) Sampdoria	4–3	0–3	4–6
1995–96	UEFA Champions League	Q	(Israel) Maccabi Tel Aviv	1–1	1–0	2-1
1995–96	UEFA Champions League	Group	(Hungary) Ferencváros TC	0–3	3–3	4th Place
1995–96	UEFA Champions League	Group	(Spain) Real Madrid	0–2	0–2	4th Place
1995–96	UEFA Champions League	Group	(Netherlands) Ajax	0–0	0–3	4th Place
1996–97	UEFA Champions League	Q	(Czech Republic) Slavia Prague	5–0	1–0	6–0
1996–97	UEFA Champions League	Group	(France) AJ Auxerre	3–1	0-1	3rd Place
1996–97	UEFA Champions League	Group	(Netherlands) Ajax	0-1	1–0	3rd Place
1996–97	UEFA Champions League	Group	(Scotland) Rangers FC	3-0	1–2	3rd Place
1997–98	UEFA Cup	Q1	(Northern Ireland) Coleraine FC	3–0	7–1	10–1
1997–98	UEFA Cup	Q2	(Norway) SK Brann	3–0	0-2	3–2
1997–98	UEFA Cup	R1	Croatia Zagreb	4-4	0–5	4–9
1998–99	UEFA Champions League	Q1	(Luxembourg) Jeunesse Esch	6–0	2–0	8–0
1998–99	UEFA Champions League	Q2	(Turkey) Galatasaray	2–3	1–2	3–5
1998–99	UEFA Cup	R1	(Belgium) RSC Anderlecht	0–0	2–0	2–0
1998–99	UEFA Cup	R2	(Italy) Fiorentina	0–2	3–0 (f)	3–2
1998–99	UEFA Cup	R3	(France) Bordeaux	3–3	0–0	3–3 (a)
1999–00	UEFA Cup	Q	(Republic of Ireland) Bray Wanderers	4–0	4–0	8–0
1999–00	UEFA Cup	R1	(Denmark) AB Copenhagen	1-1	2–0	3–1
1999–00	UEFA Cup	R2	(Czech Republic) Slavia Prague	1–0	1–3	2–3

=== 2000–2020 ===
Season	Competition	Round	Opponent	Home	Away	Series
2001-02	UEFA Champions League	Q3	(Portugal) FC Porto	2–3	2–2	4–5
2001-02	UEFA Cup	R1	(Romania) Dinamo București	3–1	3–1	6–2
2001-02	UEFA Cup	R2	(Netherlands) FC Twente	4–1	2–3	6–4
2001-02	UEFA Cup	R3	(England) Leeds United	1–2	1–1	2–3
2002–03	UEFA Cup	R1	(Russia) Zenit St. Petersburg	3–1	1–2	4–3
2002–03	UEFA Cup	R2	(Greece) PAOK	1–1	1–2	2–3
2003–04	UEFA Champions League	Q3	(Greece) AEK Athens	1–0	1–3	2–3
2003–04	UEFA Cup	R1	(Croatia) Hajduk Split	1–1	0–0	1–1 (a)
2005–06	UEFA Cup	Q2	(Poland) Wisła Płock	1–0	2–3	3–3 (a)
2005–06	UEFA Cup	R1	(Finland) MYPA	1–1	3–0	4–1
2005–06	UEFA Cup	Group	(England) Middlesbrough	0–1		5th place
2005–06	UEFA Cup	Group	(Bulgaria) Litex Lovech		1–2	5th place
2005–06	UEFA Cup	Group	(Ukraine) Dnipro Dnipropetrovsk	2–3		5th place
2005–06	UEFA Cup	Group	(Netherlands) AZ		0–1	5th place
2006–07	UEFA Cup	Q2	(Hungary) Videoton	2–0	1–1	3–1
2006–07	UEFA Cup	R1	(Sweden) Åtvidaberg	5–0	3–0	8–0
2006–07	UEFA Cup	Group	(Netherlands) AZ	2–5		5th place
2006–07	UEFA Cup	Group	(Czech Republic) Slovan Liberec		1–4	5th place
2006–07	UEFA Cup	Group	(Spain) Sevilla	0–4		5th place
2006–07	UEFA Cup	Group	(Portugal) Braga		0–2	5th place
2008–09	UEFA Cup	Q2	(Poland) Lech Poznań	0–0	0–6	0–6
2010–11	UEFA Europa League	Play-off	(Romania) Steaua București	1–0	0–1	1–1 (p)
2013–14	UEFA Champions League	Q3	(France) Lyon	0–1	0–1	0–2
2013–14	UEFA Europa League	Play-off	(Italy) Fiorentina	1–2	1–0	2–2 (a)
2014–15	UEFA Champions League	Q3	(France) Lille	0–2	1–1	1–3
2014–15	UEFA Europa League	Play-off	(Belgium) Club Brugge	1–2	0–1	1–3
2016–17	UEFA Europa League	Q2	(Iceland) KR	2–1	3–3	5–4
2016–17	UEFA Europa League	Q3	(Cyprus) Apollon Limassol	2–1	3–3	5–4
2016–17	UEFA Europa League	Play-off	(Turkey) Fenerbahçe	0–2	0–3	0–5

== UEFA Intertoto Cup ==
The UEFA Intertoto Cup was a summer football cup competition held between European clubs. Originally, it was called the International Football Cup and later the Intertoto Cup. Early editions had only one winner, but from 1967 onward, the competition would have multiple group winners. From 1995 until its abolishment in 2008, the competition was organized by UEFA and functioned as qualifier for the UEFA Cup.

=== Pre-UEFA Period (1961–1995) ===
Season	Round	Opponent	Home	Away	Series
1965–66	Group	(Germany) Kaiserslautern	2–4	1–1	4th
1965–66	Group	(Sweden) Djurgården	4–2	2–3	4th
1965–66	Group	(Netherlands) Fortuna '54	0–1	1–2	4th
1967	Group	(Poland) Polonia Bytom	1–4	1–5	4th
1967	Group	(Germany) Werder Bremen	1–2	1–1	4th
1967	Group	(Sweden) IF Elfsborg	3–1	2–5	4th
1970	Group	(Germany) Braunschweig	1–5	0–2	2nd
1970	Group	(Sweden) IFK Norrköping	2–1	1–1	2nd
1970	Group	(Austria) Wiener Sport-Club	2–1	3–1	2nd
1971	Group	(Sweden) Djurgården	0–2	0–1	4th
1971	Group	(Czechoslovakia) Inter Bratislava	4–3	2–9	4th
1971	Group	(Austria) Wiener Sport-Club	1–3	0–3	4th
1972	Group	(Denmark) Hvidovre IF	1–1	3–0	2nd
1972	Group	(Germany) Hannover 96	1–1	2–3	2nd
1972	Group	(Poland) Stal Mielec	1–1	1–4	2nd

=== UEFA Period (1995–2008) ===
Season	Round	Opponent	Home	Away	Series
2006	R2	(Czech Republic) FK Teplice	2–0	2–0	4–0
2006	R3	(Belgium) KAA Gent	2–1	1–1	3–1
2008	R2	(Albania) KF Besa Kavajë	2–1	3–0	5–1
2008	R3	(Bulgaria) Chernomorets Burgas	3–0	1–0	4–0
