= Svava Rós Guðmundsdóttir =

Icelandic footballer (born 1995)

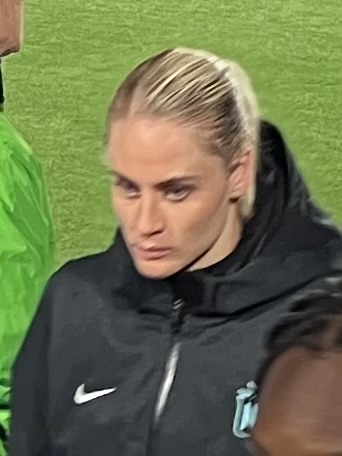
- Svava Rós in 2023

Personal information
- Full name: Svava Rós Guðmundsdóttir
- Date of birth: 11 November 1995 (age 31)
- Place of birth: Reykjavík, Iceland
- Position: Forward

Senior career*
Years	Team	Apps	(Gls)
2011–2014	Valur	50	(16)
2015–2017	Breiðablik	53	(10)
2018	Røa IL	24	(18)
2019–2021	Kristianstads	36	(10)
2021	Girondins de Bordeaux	7	(0)
2022–2023	Brann	30	(9)
2023–2024	NJ/NY Gotham	5	(0)
2023–2024	→ SL Benfica (loan)	2	(0)

International career^{‡}
2012	Iceland U17	6	(1)
2012–2014	Iceland U19	9	(3)
2017–2023	Iceland	47	(2)
- * Club domestic league appearances and goals as of 16:55, 2 November 2025 (UTC) ‡ National team caps and goals as of 16:55, 2 November 2025 (UTC)

Svava Rós Guðmundsdóttir (born 11 November 1995) is an Icelandic former professional footballer who has represented the Iceland national team on numerous occasions. At club level, she most recently played for S.L. Benfica on loan from NJ/NY Gotham.

== Club career ==
Svava Rós started her senior playing career in the summer of 2011 with Icelandic team Valur, making her debut in a match against Breiðablik, aged 15. Two years later, in 2013, she signed a two-year contract with Valur. Prior to the 2015 Úrvalsdeild kvenna season, Svava Rós transferred to Breiðablik, winning the league in her first season with the club. Svava Rós had the most assists in the 2016 and 2017 Úrvalsdeild kvenna championships.

In 2018, Svava Rós signed for Norwegian Toppserien team Røa IL. During the 2018 Toppserien season, Svava Rós scored 14 goals in 21 matches, and was named in the Team of the Year. In November 2018, Svava Rós signed for Swedish team Kristianstads DFF for the 2019 Damallsvenskan season.

In January 2021, Svava Rós joined French club FC Girondins de Bordeaux. She left the club in December 2021, and in February 2022, she signed for Norwegian club SK Brann. She was part of the Brann team that won the 2022 Toppserien. In January 2023, Svava Rós joined US National Women's Soccer League club NJ/NY Gotham FC. Later in the year, she was loaned to Benfica. In February 2024, due to an injury, her loan with Benfica was terminated, and she also left Gotham.

In October 2025, Svava Rós announced her retirement from professional football. She cited a reoccurring hip injury as a large part of her decision.

== International career ==
Svava Rós made six appearances for Iceland U17, scoring once in a match against Austria U17. She also played nine matches for Iceland U19, scoring three times.

Svava Rós scored her first senior goal for Iceland in a 2019 Algarve Cup match against Portugal, in which Iceland won 4–1.

== International goals ==
No.	Date	Venue	Opponent	Score	Result	Competition
1.	6 March 2019	Bela Vista Municipal Stadium, Parchal, Portugal	Portugal	4–1	4–1	2019 Algarve Cup
2.	22 October 2021	Laugardalsvöllur, Reykjavík, Iceland	Czech Republic	3–0	4–0	2023 FIFA Women's World Cup qualification
