= 1920–21 Swiss Serie A =

Swiss football season

Swiss Serie A
- Season: 1920–21

Statistics of Swiss Super League in the 1920–21 season.

== East ==
=== Table ===
Pos	Team	Pld	W	D	L	GF	GA	GD	Pts
1	Grasshopper Club Zürich	14	10	2	2	32	16	+16	22
2	FC Winterthur	14	8	2	4	35	25	+10	18
3	FC Zürich	14	8	1	5	31	24	+7	17
4	Blue Stars Zürich	14	7	2	5	23	27	−4	16
5	FC St. Gallen	14	6	2	6	37	21	+16	14
6	Neumünster Zürich	14	3	6	5	21	30	−9	12
7	Young Fellows Zürich	14	4	1	9	23	41	−18	9
8	Brühl St. Gallen	14	1	2	11	17	35	−18	4

Source: rsssf.com

=== Results ===
Home \ Away	BSZ	BRÜ	GCZ	NEU	STG	WIN	YFZ	ZÜR
Blue Stars Zürich		3–0	1–4	1–1	1–1	2–0	3–0	1–2
Brühl	1–2		0–1	2–2	0–4	1–2	2–3	3–2
Grasshopper	5–2	3–0		3–2	2–1	0–0	2–1	0–2
Neumünster	1–2	2–1	1–1		1–1	2–2	4–1	2–2
St. Gallen	7–0	1–0	4–1	1–2		2–3	7–1	4–2
Winterthur	3–0 (Note: Match awarded.)	5–3	0–1	6–0	3–2		4–2	5–4
Young Fellows	1–3	2–2	1–7	5–1	3–1	2–1		0–1
Zürich	1–2	3–2	1–2	2–0	2–1	4–1	3–1	

Legend: Blue = home team win; Yellow = draw; Red = away team win.

== Central ==
=== Table ===
Pos	Team	Pld	W	D	L	GF	GA	GD	Pts
1	Young Boys Bern	15	9	4	2	30	15	+15	22
2	Old Boys Basel	15	9	2	4	32	22	+10	20
3	FC Biel	14	7	5	2	26	12	+14	19
4	Nordstern Basel	14	6	4	4	23	17	+6	16
5	FC Bern	14	5	3	6	26	30	−4	13
6	FC Aarau	14	3	6	5	13	20	−7	12
7	FC Basel	15	3	2	10	20	29	−9	8
8	FC Lucerne	15	2	2	11	17	42	−25	6

Source: rsssf.com

=== Results ===
Home \ Away	AAR	BAS	BER	BIE	LUZ	NOR	OBB	YB
Aarau		3–1	3–0	0–0	1–0	0–1	1–1	1–1
Basel	2–2		3–0	0–2	4–1	1–1	1–4	0–1
Bern	3–0	2–0		0–0	3–0	1–0	1–4	1–3
Biel	1–0	1–0	1–1		3–2	4–1	1–1	2–3
Luzern	1–1	2–1	3–3	0–6		4–3	2–3	0–2
Nordstern	4–0	3–2	6–3	0–0	2–0		0–1	0–0
Old Boys	4–0	3–2	2–8	2–1	5–0	0–1		1–0
Young Boys	1–1	4–1	5–0	2–4	3–2	1–1	2–1	

Legend: Blue = home team win; Yellow = draw; Red = away team win.

== West ==
=== Table ===
Pos	Team	Pld	W	D	L	GF	GA	GD	Pts
1	Servette Genf	14	9	3	2	31	11	+20	21
2	Cantonal Neuchatel	14	8	2	4	29	16	+13	18
3	FC La Chaux-de-Fonds	14	7	3	4	26	18	+8	17
4	Etoile La Chaux-de-Fonds	14	7	3	4	20	17	+3	17
5	FC Fribourg	14	3	6	5	16	21	−5	12
6	Lausanne Sports	14	2	7	5	21	30	−9	11
7	FC Genf	14	3	5	6	14	21	−7	11
8	Montreux Sports	14	2	1	11	16	39	−23	5

Source: rsssf.com

=== Results ===
Home \ Away	CAN	CDF	ÉTS	FRI	GEN	LS	MON
Cantonal Neuchâtel		1–2	3–1	0–0	2–0	3–1	6–0
Chaux-de-Fonds	0–0		0–1	3–0	2–3	3–2	3–1
Étoile-Sporting	3–2	0–2		0–0	2–1	2–2	2–0
Fribourg	1–3	3–1	2–4		1–1	0–0	3–1
Genève	1–2	1–2	0–1	1–1		3–1	1–0
Lausanne-Sports	2–1	1–1	2–2	3–3	1–1		3–0
Montreux-Sports	1–3	2–5	0–2	3–1	1–1	3–2	

Legend: Blue = home team win; Yellow = draw; Red = away team win.

== Final ==
=== Table ===
Pos	Team	Pld	W	D	L	GF	GA	GD	Pts
1	Grasshopper Club Zürich	2	2	0	0	8	1	+7	4
2	Young Boys Bern	2	1	0	1	4	4	0	2
3	Servette Genf	2	0	0	2	1	8	−7	0

Source: rsssf.com

=== Results ===
Team 1	Score	Team 2
17 April 1921
Grasshopper	5–0	Servette
24 April 1921
Young Boys	3–1	Servette
8 May 1921
Grasshopper	3–1	Young Boys

Grasshopper Club Zürich won the championship.

== Sources ==
- Switzerland 1920-21 at RSSSF
