= Caroline Müller (footballer) =

Swiss footballer (born 1989)

Personal information
- Full name: Caroline Müller
- Date of birth: 18 May 1989 (age 37)
- Place of birth: Switzerland
- Position: Striker

Senior career*
Years	Team	Apps	(Gls)
- FC Oerlikon Polizei
- Grasshopper
2010–2011	Levante	11	(0)
2011–2021	Grasshopper	0	(25)
2021–2022	SE AEM	10	(1)

International career
2018–	Switzerland	3	(0)
- * Club domestic league appearances and goals

Caroline Müller is a Swiss football striker who most recently played for Grasshopper Zürich in the Swiss Women's Super League. She has also played for Levante UD in the Spanish Superleague.

Müller was called up to the Swiss national team, firstly in a friendly against Japan in October 2017 and later in a World Cup qualifier against Albania in November 2017. She was an unused substitute in all of her international games.
