= Harald Gärtner =

German footballer

Personal information
- Date of birth: 30 November 1968 (age 57)
- Height: 1.80 m (5 ft 11 in)
- Position: Defender

Senior career*
| Years | Team | Apps | (Gls) |
| 1992–1994 | Fortuna Düsseldorf | | |
| 1994–1996 | SV Meppen | | |
| 1996–2000 | Hannover 96 | | |
| 2000 | VfB Admira Wacker Mödling | | |
| 2001 | Jahn Regensburg | | |
| 2001 | Darmstadt 98 | | |
| 2002 | SC Waldgirmes | | |

Managerial career
- 2003–2004: FC St. Pauli (assistant)
- * Club domestic league appearances and goals

Harald Gärtner (born 30 November 1968) is a German former professional footballer who played as a defender.
