= Dalila Ippólito =

Argentine footballer (born 2002)

Dalila Ippolito
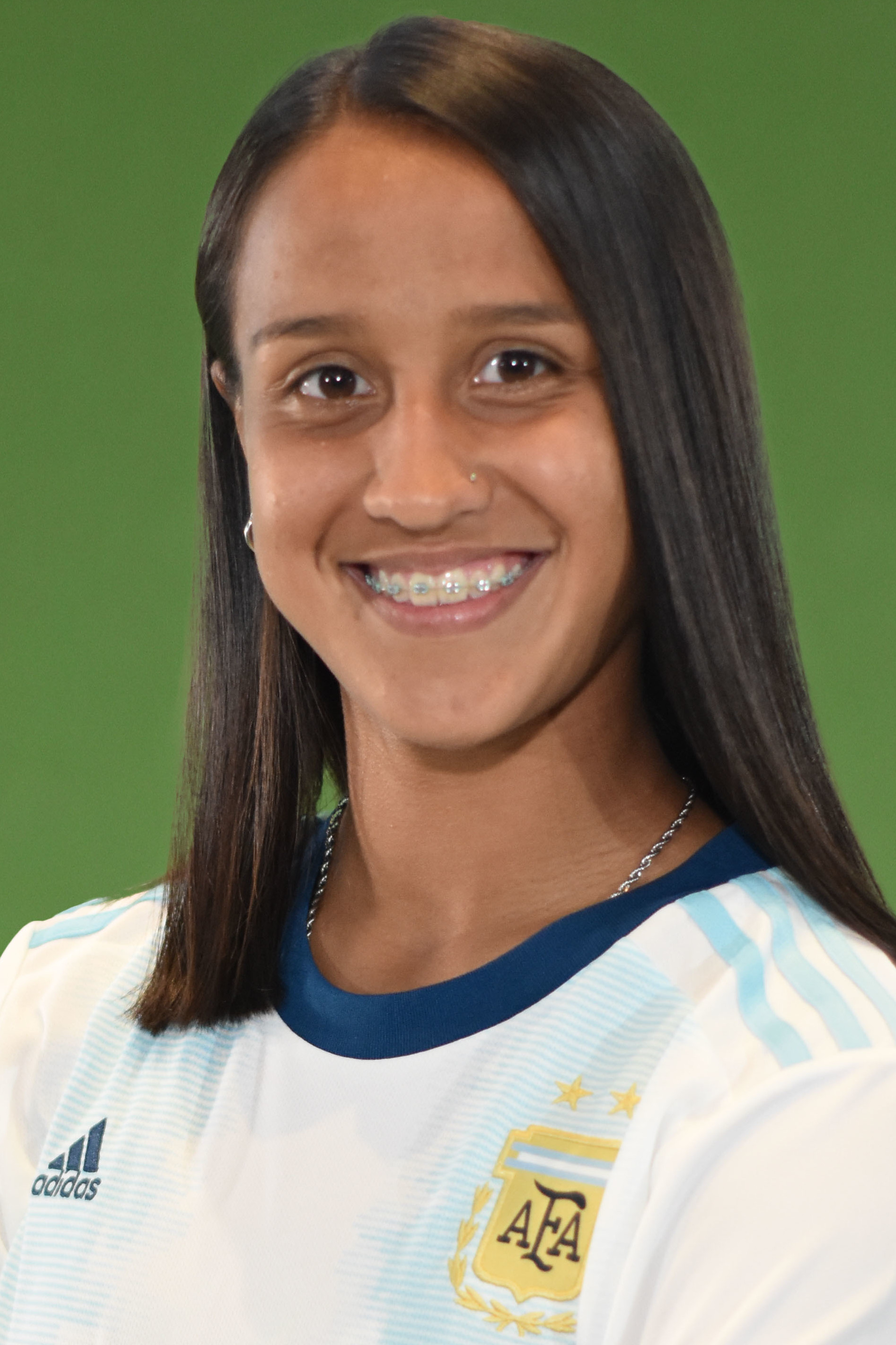
- Ippolito with Argentina U20 in 2020

Personal information
- Full name: Dalila Belén Ippolito
- Date of birth: 24 March 2002 (age 24)
- Place of birth: Villa Lugano, Buenos Aires, Argentina
- Height: 1.56 m (5 ft 1 in)
- Position: Midfielder

Team information
- Current team: Grasshopper Club Zurich
- Number: 90

Senior career*
Years	Team	Apps	(Gls)
2015–2019	River Plate		
2019–2020	UAI Urquiza		
2020–2022	Juventus	4	(0)
2021–2022	→ Pomigliano (loan)	19	(2)
2022–2023	Parma	4	(0)
2023–2024	Pomigliano	20	(3)
2024–	Grasshopper Club Zurich		

International career^{‡}
2018	Argentina U17	1	(0)
2020–2022	Argentina U20	4	(0)
2017–	Argentina	24	(1)
Medal record
Women's football
Representing Argentina
Pan American Games
Silver medal – second place	2019 Lima	Team
- * Club domestic league appearances and goals as of 15 February 2024 ‡ National team caps and goals as of 28 February 2024

Dalila Belén Ippolito (born 24 March 2002) is an Argentine professional footballer who plays as a midfielder for Grasshopper Club Zurich and the Argentina women's national team.

== Club career ==
In 2015, Ippolito debuted for River Plate at the age of 13.

In August 2020, Ippolito signed for Italian team Juventus. On 30 July 2021, she moved to Pomigliano on loan. She signed for Parma in August 2022.

In 2023, after appearing at the World Cup, she returned to Pomigliano.

== International career ==
On 22 May 2019, Ippolito was included in Argentina's squad for the 2019 FIFA Women's World Cup in France. On 24 May 2019, she appeared in a match against Uruguay, which finished as a 3–1 win.

She was again named to the Argentina squad for the 2023 FIFA Women's World Cup and appeared in two games.

== Honours ==
- Serie A: 2020–21
- Supercoppa Italiana: 2020

Individual

- IFFHS CONMEBOL (U-20) women's team of the year: 2020
