= Nina Predanič =

Slovenian footballer

Personal information
- Date of birth: 28 May 1997 (age 29)
- Place of birth: Brežice, Slovenia
- Height: 1.66 m (5 ft 5 in)
- Position: Forward

Team information
- Current team: Grasshopper
- Number: 28

Youth career
- 2008 - 2011: Brezice

College career
Years	Team	Apps	(Gls)
2016-2019	TC Saint Rose		

Senior career*
Years	Team	Apps	(Gls)
2011–2012	Grosuplje	22	(10)
2012–2019	ZNK Radomlje	41	(41)
2019	Split	10	(5)
2020–2021	Sturm Graz	15	(11)
2021-	Grasshopper	11	(4)

International career^{‡}
2012	Slovenia U17	3	(0)
2014–2015	Slovenia U19	9	(1)
2016–	Slovenia	8	(1)
- * Club domestic league appearances and goals ‡ National team caps and goals as of 14 June 2021

Nina Predanič (born 28 May 1997) is a Slovenian footballer who plays as a forward for Grasshopper Club Zürich and the Slovenia women's national team.
