= Morgane Nicoli =

French footballer (born 1997)

Personal information
- Full name: Morgane Marie Josephine Nicoli
- Date of birth: 7 April 1997 (age 29)
- Place of birth: Bastia, France
- Height: 1.75 m (5 ft 9 in)
- Position: Defender

Team information
- Current team: GC Zurich
- Number: 22

Youth career
- 2004–2009: AS de Bravone
- 2009–2012: FC Costa Verde
- 2012–2013: GC Lucciana
- 2013–2016: Montpellier

Senior career*
Years	Team	Apps	(Gls)
2014–2022	Montpellier	38	(1)
2018–2019	→ Lille (loan)	21	(1)
2022–2023	Sevilla	16	(0)
2023–2025	Levante Badalona	32	(3)
2025–	GC Zurich	6	(1)

International career
2012	France U16	5	(1)
2012–2013	France U17	12	(0)
2016	France U19	1	(0)
2019	France U23	3	(0)
- * Club domestic league appearances and goals as of 22 March 2025

Morgane Marie Josephine Nicoli (born 7 April 1997) is a French footballer who plays as a defender for Swiss Women's Super League club GC Zurich.
