= Carlos Bernegger =

Argentine-Swiss footballer (born 1969)

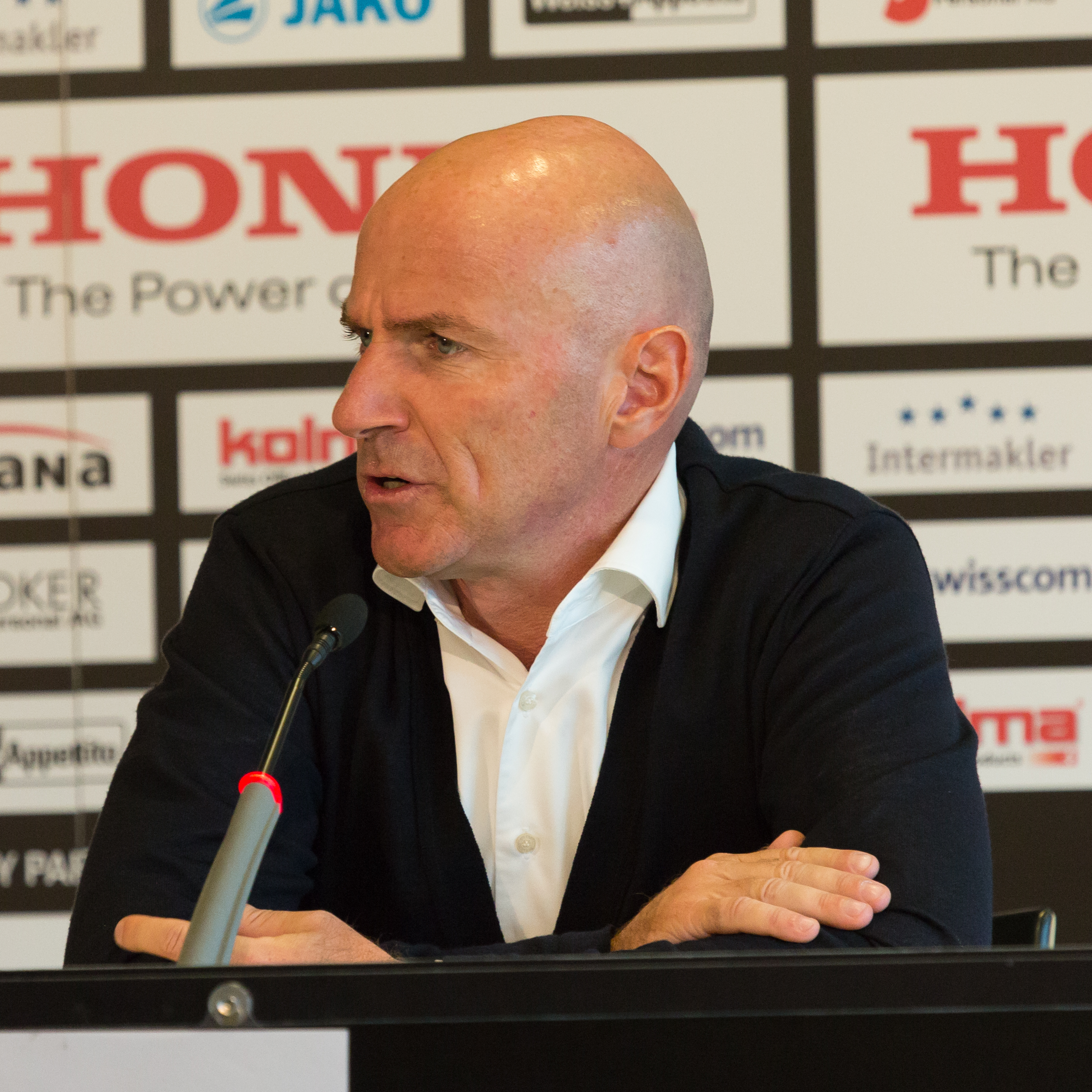

Personal information
- Full name: Juan Carlos Bernegger
- Date of birth: 3 March 1969 (age 57)
- Place of birth: Bell Ville, Argentina
- Position: Midfielder

Team information
- Current team: Zürich (assistant coach)

Senior career*
| Years | Team | Apps | (Gls) |
| 1987–1991 | Belgrano | 6 | (2) |
| 1991–1993 | Winterthur | 6 | (0) |

Managerial career
- 2000–2007: Grasshopper youth
- 2005–2007: Grasshopper U21
- 2007–2011: Basel U21
- 2013–2014: Luzern
- 2017: Grasshopper
- 2018–2020: FC Basel (assistant)
- 2020–2022: FC Thun
- 2023–2025: Al Ahly (assistant)
- 2026–: Zürich (assistant)
- 2026: Zürich (interim)
- * Club domestic league appearances and goals

Juan Carlos Bernegger (born 9 March 1969) is an Argentine-Swiss football manager and a former player who played as a midfielder. He is the assistant manager of Zürich.

== Managerial career ==
Bernegger had a brief career in football with Belgrano in Argentina and then Winterthur in Switzerland, but had to retire because of ligament injuries in 1993 at the age of 21. Bernegger decided to stay in Switzerland, and made his name as a youth scout and youth coach for Winterthur. Bernegger became long-term youth coach for Grasshopper, and after a couple stints at Basel U21 and Luzern rejoined Grasshopper as the head manager in 2016.

From 2018 until 2020, he worked as assistant under Marcel Koller at FC Basel and won the Swiss Cup in 2019.

On 4 May 2022, FC Thun announced that Bernegger will leave the club at the end of the 2021–22 season.

In August 2023, he rejoined Koller as his assistant at Egyptian giants Al Ahly SC. He departed Al Ahly when Koller was sacked in April 2025.

On 2 March 2026, he joined FC Zürich as assistant manager to head coach Dennis Hediger. On 14 April 2026, following Hediger's dismissal, he was appointed interim head coach until the end of the season.

== Personal life ==
Bernegger's grandparents emigrated from St. Gallen, Switzerland to Argentina after World War II.
