= Marta Cazalla =

Spanish footballer (born 1997)

Personal information
- Full name: Marta Cazalla Garcia
- Date of birth: 5 April 1997 (age 29)
- Place of birth: Spain
- Height: 1.79 m (5 ft 10 in)
- Position: Defender

Team information
- Current team: Grasshoppers
- Number: 15

Senior career*
Years	Team	Apps	(Gls)
-2018	Atlético Madrid	16	(0)
2018–2019	Málaga	16	(2)
2019–2020	Real Betis	19	(1)
2020–2021	Logroño	28	(0)
2021–2023	Grasshoppers	42	(18)
2023–2025	TSG Hoffenheim	41	(12)
2025–	Grasshoppers	14	(6)
- * Club domestic league appearances and goals as of 03:44, 18 November 2025 (UTC)

Marta Cazalla Garcia (born 5 April 1997) is a Spanish footballer who plays as a defender for Swiss Women's Super League club Grasshopper Club Zurich. She is an offensively-minded centre back, having scored five goals during the 2024–25 Bundesliga season.
