= Melanie Müller (footballer) =

Swiss footballer (born 1996)

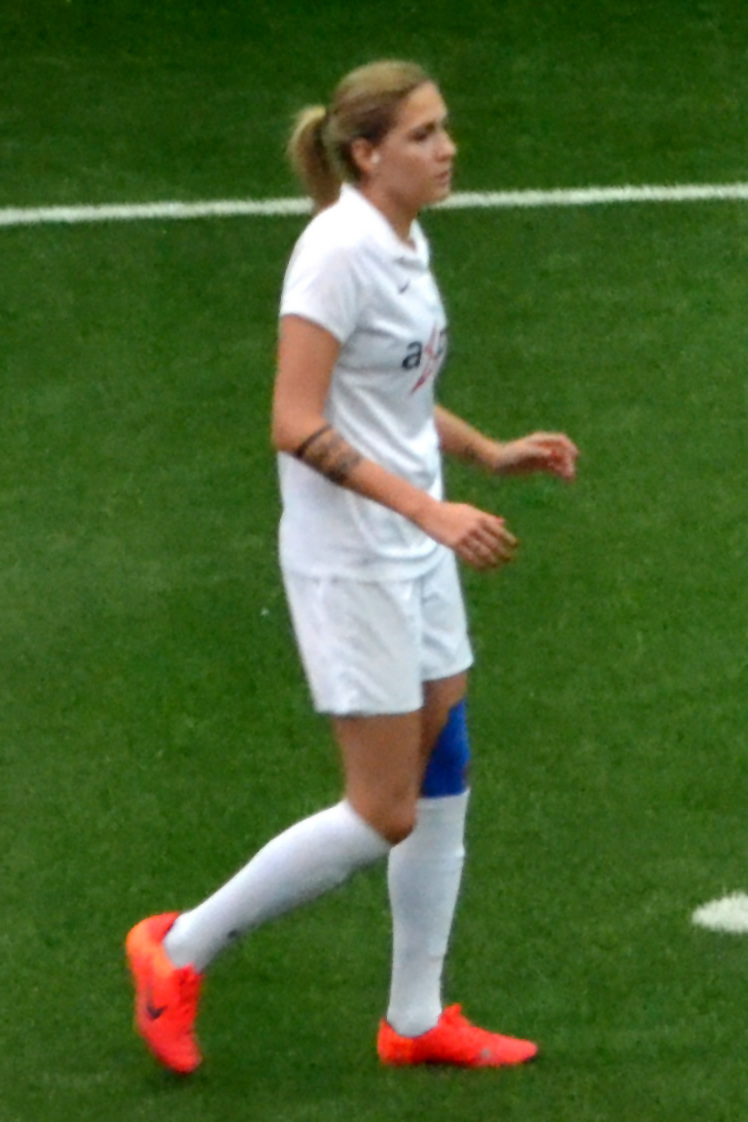

Personal information
- Date of birth: 31 May 1996 (age 30)
- Height: 1.72 m (5 ft 7 1/2 in)
- Position: Midfielder

Team information
- Current team: Grasshopper
- Number: 27

Senior career*
Years	Team	Apps	(Gls)
2018–2023	Luzern	81	(6)
2023–	Grasshopper	10	(0)

International career^{‡}
2012–2013	Switzerland U-17	5	(1)
2013–2015	Switzerland U-19	9	(3)
2016–	Switzerland	11	(1)
- * Club domestic league appearances and goals ‡ National team caps and goals as of 6 March 2019

Melanie Müller (born 31 May 1996) is a Swiss footballer who plays as a midfielder for Swiss Women's Super League club Grasshopper Club Zürich and the Switzerland national team.
