= Uli Forte =

Swiss football coach (born 1974)

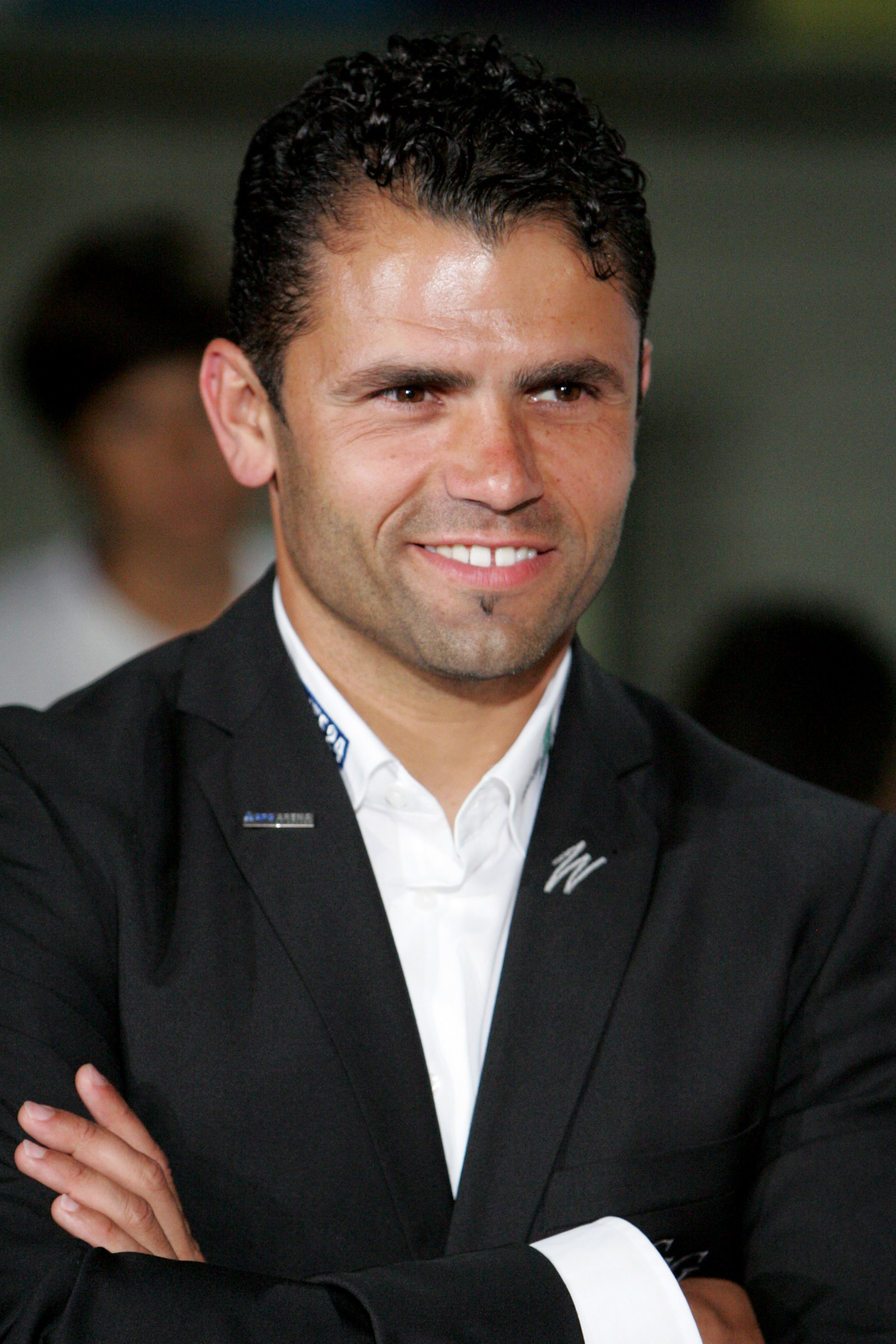
- Forte in 2008

Personal information
- Full name: Ulrich Massimo Forte
- Date of birth: 30 April 1974 (age 52)
- Place of birth: Zurich, Switzerland
- Height: 1.85 m (6 ft 1 in)
- Position: Centre back

Team information
- Current team: FC Winterthur

Senior career*
Years	Team	Apps	(Gls)
–1994	FC Brüttisellen-Dietlikon		
1994–1999	FC Red Star Zürich		
1999–2002	SC Kriens		
2002–2006	FC Red Star Zürich		

Managerial career
- 2001–2006: FC Red Star Zürich (player-manager)
- 2006–2008: FC Wil 1900
- 2008–2011: St. Gallen
- 2012–2013: Grasshoppers
- 2013–2015: BSC Young Boys
- 2016–2018: FC Zürich
- 2019–2020: Grasshoppers
- 2021–2022: Yverdon-Sport
- 2022: Arminia Bielefeld
- 2023–2024: Neuchâtel Xamax
- 2024–2025: Winterthur
- * Club domestic league appearances and goals

Ulrich Massimo Forte (born 30 April 1974) is a Swiss football coach and former player from Switzerland. He most recently managed FC Winterthur in the Swiss Super League.

== Personal life ==
Forte was born in Zürich to a family originally from Salerno, Italy. He holds dual Swiss-Italian citizenship.

== Career ==
=== As a player ===
As a player, Forte played for FC Brüttisellen-Dietlikon, FC Red Star Zürich and SC Kriens.

=== As a manager ===
In 2001, Forte was a player-coach at FC Red Star Zürich. In 2006, he moved to FC Wil 1900. After coaching FC Wil 1900 for two years, he signed for FC St. Gallen. He was fired on 1 March 2011. One year later, on 16 April 2012, he signed as the new manager of Grasshopper Club Zürich, whom he led to 2012–13 Swiss Cup victory. It was the club's first title in ten years.

From July 2013 until August 2015 he was the head coach of BSC Young Boys. On 13 May 2016 he signed as the head coach of FC Zürich.

On 10 August 2021, he was hired by Yverdon-Sport. Despite a modest league performance, which saw his team end eight out of ten teams in the 2021–22 Swiss Challenge League, he led his team to the semi-final of the 2021–22 Swiss Cup.

After one season with Yverdon, he was appointed by Arminia Bielefeld, on 4 June 2022. On 17 August 2022, Forte was sacked after four losses in the new season.

On 25 April 2023, he returned to the Swiss Challenge League taking over Neuchâtel Xamax, who were sitting in last place.

On 24 December 2024, he departed Xamax to take up the coaching job at FC Winterthur. Like Xamax before, Winterthur were in last place of the Swiss Super League. He ended up keeping Winterthur in the Swiss Super League, finishing 10th at the end of the 2024–25 season, one point ahead of the relegation play-off spot. However, he was terminated on 20 October 2025, after achieving just two points in the first nine games of the 2025–26 season.

== Honours ==
=== Manager ===
Grasshopper

- Swiss Cup: 2012–13
