= 2024–25 Grasshopper Club Zurich season =

Grasshopper Club Zurich
2024–25 season
- Chairman: Stacy Johns
- Manager: Tomas Oral
- Stadium: Letzigrund, Zürich, Switzerland
- Swiss Super League: 11th
- Swiss Cup: Round of 16
- Top goalscorer: League: Nikolas Muci (7); All: Nikolas Muci (8)
- Highest home attendance: 21,497
- Lowest home attendance: 2,323
- Average home league attendance: 6,951
- Biggest win: 5–0 (vs. Yverdon on 14 May 2025)
- Biggest defeat: 0–3
Home colours	Away colours
- All statistics correct as of 1 June 2025.

The 2024–25 Grasshopper Club Zurich season is the club's fourth season back in the Swiss Super League, after winning promotion in 2021 and avoiding relegation by winning last season's relegation play-off. The season will start on 20 July 2024. Grasshoppers will also participate in the Swiss Cup.

== Squad ==
=== Players ===
As of 31 May 2025

No.	Name	Nationality	Pos	Date of birth (age)	at GCZ since	Apps	Goals	Former club
Goalkeepers
23	Nicolas Glaus	(Switzerland)	GK	10 May 2002 (age 24)	06/2023	0	0	Stuttgart II
29	Manuel Kuttin	(Austria)	GK	17 December 1993 (age 32)	06/2023	5	0	free agent
50	Laurent Seji	(Switzerland)	GK	22 June 2004 (age 22)	06/2024	0	0	own youth
71	Justin Hammel	(Switzerland)	GK	2 December 2000 (age 25)	06/2022	91	0	Lausanne-Ouchy
Defenders
2	Dirk Abels	(Netherlands)	RB	13 June 1997 (age 29)	07/2023	60	1	Sparta Rotterdam
3	Saulo Decarli	(Switzerland)	CB	4 February 1992 (age 34)	06/2024	21	0	Eintracht Braunschweig
4	Grayson Dettoni	(United States) (Italy)	CB	29 June 2005 (age 21)	01/2025	0	0	Bayern Munich (on loan)
12	Maksim Paskotši	(Estonia)	CB	19 January 2003 (age 23)	09/2023	59	1	Tottenham Hotspur
15	Ayumu Seko	(Japan)	CB	7 June 2000 (age 26)	01/2022	109	4	Cerezo Osaka
16	Noah Persson	(Sweden)	LB	16 July 2003 (age 23)	09/2024	32	1	Young Boys (on loan)
22	Benno Schmitz	(Germany)	RB	17 November 1994 (age 31)	07/2024	30	0	1. FC Köln
24	Michael Kempter	(Philippines) (Switzerland)	LB	12 January 1995 (age 31)	06/2023	6	0	St. Gallen
52	Samuel Marques	(Switzerland)	CB	4 February 2005 (age 21)	04/2024	0	0	own youth
57	Elvir Zukaj	(Albania) (Switzerland)	CB	7 July 2002 (age 24)	07/2023	3	0	own youth
Midfielders
6	Amir Abrashi	(Albania) (Switzerland)	CM	27 March 1990 (age 36)	06/2021	276	11	Basel
7	Tsiy-William Ndenge	(Germany) (Cameroon)	DM	13 June 1997 (age 29)	07/2022	91	15	Luzern
8	Sonny Kittel	(Germany)	AM	6 January 1993 (age 33)	08/2024	28	5	Raków Częstochowa
10	Giotto Morandi	(Switzerland)	PM	4 March 1999 (age 27)	06/2019	157	25	own youth
11	Pascal Schürpf	(Switzerland)	AM	15 July 1989 (age 37)	06/2023	63	11	Luzern
14	Imourane Hassane	(Benin)	DM	8 April 2003 (age 23)	01/2025	14	0	Loto-Popo FC
19	Mathieu Choinière	(Canada)	CM	7 February 1999 (age 27)	08/2024	18	1	CF Montréal
28	Simone Stroscio	(Switzerland)	DM	20 August 2003 (age 23)	10/2021	8	0	own youth
53	Tim Meyer	(Switzerland)	CM	8 July 2004 (age 22)	07/2023	52	1	own youth
55	Damian Nigg	(Switzerland)	RW	12 April 2005 (age 21)	07/2023	4	0	own youth
77	Filipe de Carvalho	(Switzerland) (Portugal)	LW	1 December 2003 (age 22)	01/2022	67	4	own youth
Forwards
9	Nikolas Muci	(Switzerland)	ST	8 February 2003 (age 23)	07/2024	39	9	Lugano
17	Tomás Verón Lupi	(Argentina) (Italy)	RW	3 September 2000 (age 26)	09/2024	27	3	RC Montevideo (on loan)
18	Lee Young-jun	(South Korea)	ST	23 May 2003 (age 23)	07/2024	22	4	Suwon FC
20	Evans Maurin	(France)	ST	30 March 2001 (age 25)	07/2024	17	1	Yverdon-Sport
25	Adama Bojang	(The Gambia)	ST	28 May 2004 (age 22)	09/2024	27	6	Reims (on loan)
27	Bryan Lasme	(France) (Ivory Coast)	ST	14 November 1998 (age 27)	01/2025	4	0	Schalke 04 (on loan)
66	Nestory Irankunda	(Australia) (Tanzania)	RW	9 February 2006 (age 20)	01/2025	21	1	Bayern Munich (on loan)
Players loaned out during the season
23	Nicolas Glaus	(Switzerland)	GK	10 May 2002 (age 24)	06/2023	0	0	Stuttgart II
73	Florian Hoxha	(Kosovo) (Switzerland)	LB	22 February 2001 (age 25)	07/2021	29	1	own youth
Players departed during the season
4	Kristers Tobers	(Latvia)	CB	13 December 2000 (age 25)	07/2023	44	1	Lechia Gdańsk
5	Joshua Laws	(Australia) (Scotland)	CB	26 February 1998 (age 28)	08/2023	23	0	Wellington Phoenix
14	Théo Ndicka	(France) (Cameroon)	LB	20 April 2000 (age 26)	08/2023	36	1	Oostende
17	Renat Dadashov	(Azerbaijan) (Germany)	CF	17 May 1999 (age 27)	07/2022	40	10	Wolverhampton
21	Awer Mabil	(Australia) (South Sudan)	LW	15 September 1995 (age 31)	08/2023	32	8	Cádiz
27	Asumah Abubakar	(Portugal) (Ghana)	CF	10 May 1997 (age 29)	01/2024	25	2	Luzern
99	Dorian Babunski	(North Macedonia) (Spain)	ST	29 August 1996 (age 30)	08/2023	34	5	Debrecen

=== Coaching staff ===
As of 19 November 2024

Position	Name	Since
Head coach	(Germany) Tomas Oral	11/2024
Assistant coach	(Switzerland) Giuseppe Morello	11/2024
Assistant coach	(Germany) Michael Henke	11/2024
Athletic coach	(Switzerland) Jörg Mikoleit	06/2024
Goalie Coach	(Switzerland) Jörg Stiel	06/2021
Video analyst	(Estonia) Rain Nappir	04/2021

== Transfers ==
=== In ===
Permanent signing Loan transfer

Date	No.	Pos	Player	Transferred from	Fee/notes	Ref.
12 June 2024	3	DF	(Switzerland) Saulo Decarli	(Germany) Eintracht Braunschweig	Free transfer	
12 June 2024	50	GK	(Switzerland) Laurent Seji	(Switzerland) Grasshoppers U21	Professional contract	
30 June 2024	74	FW	(Switzerland) Elmin Rastoder	(Liechtenstein) Vaduz	Loan return	
19 June 2024	–	AC	(Switzerland) Giuseppe Morello	(Switzerland) Young Boys		
30 June 2024	17	FW	(Azerbaijan) Renat Dadashov	(Turkey) Hatayspor	Loan return	
30 June 2024	28	MF	(Switzerland) Simone Stroscio	(Switzerland) Schaffhausen	Loan return	
1 July 2024	9	FW	(Switzerland) Nikolas Muci	(Switzerland) Lugano	Undisclosed fee	
1 July 2024	20	FW	(France) Evans Maurin	(Switzerland) Yverdon-Sport	Undisclosed fee	
25 July 2024	22	DF	(Germany) Benno Schmitz	(Germany) 1. FC Köln	Free transfer	
29 July 2024	18	FW	(South Korea) Lee Young-jun	(South Korea) Suwon FC	Undisclosed fee	
22 August 2024	–	MF	~~(Benin) Imourane Hassane~~ (Note: Grasshoppers have cancelled this transfer, due to contract disputes with Imourane's former clubs.)	~~(Benin) Loto-Popo FC~~	~~Loan + option~~	
24 August 2024	8	MF	(Germany) Sonny Kittel	(Poland) Raków Częstochowa	Undisclosed fee	
27 August 2024	19	MF	(Canada) Mathieu Choinière	(Canada) Montréal	Undisclosed fee	
2 September 2024	16	DF	(Sweden) Noah Persson	(Switzerland) Young Boys	Loan	
5 September 2024	17	FW	(Argentina) Tomás Verón Lupi	(Uruguay) RC Montevideo	Loan + option	
7 September 2024	25	FW	(The Gambia) Adama Bojang	(France) Reims	Loan	
19 November 2024	–	C	(Germany) Tomas Oral			
19 November 2024	–	AC	(Germany) Michael Henke			
4 January 2025	66	FW	(Australia) Nestory Irankunda	(Germany) Bayern Munich	Loan	
6 January 2025	14	MF	(Benin) Imourane Hassane	(Benin) Loto-Popo FC	Loan + option	
14 January 2025	27	FW	(France) Bryan Lasme	(Germany) Schalke 04	Loan	
28 January 2025	4	FW	(United States) Grayson Dettoni	(Germany) Bayern Munich	Loan	
3 February 2025	23	GK	(Switzerland) Nicolas Glaus	(Switzerland) FC Schaffhausen	Loan return	
11 April 2025	14	MF	(Benin) Imourane Hassane	(Benin) Loto-Popo FC	Activated buy option	

=== Out ===
Permanent departure Loan transfer

Date	No.	Pos	Player	Transferred to	Fee/notes	Ref.
30 June 2024	–	FW	(China) Jia Boyan	(China) Nantong Zhiyun	Free	
30 June 2024	74	FW	(Switzerland) Elmin Rastoder	(Switzerland) Thun	Free	
30 June 2024	9	FW	(Switzerland) Bradley Fink	(Switzerland) FC Basel	Loan return	
30 June 2024	70	MF	(Germany) Oliver Batista Meier	(Germany) Dynamo Dresden	Loan return	
30 June 2024	19	MF	(Austria) Dijon Kameri	(Austria) Red Bull Salzburg	Loan return	
30 June 2024	54	DF	(Switzerland) Liam Bollati	(Switzerland) Kriens	Loan return	
30 June 2024	40	MF	(Germany) Robin Kalem	(Germany) Hannover 96 II	Contract expiry	
30 June 2024	90	GK	(Switzerland) Steven Deana	Free agent	Contract expiry	
30 June 2024	22	FW	(Nigeria) Francis Momoh	(Ukraine) LNZ Cherkasy	Contract expiry	
30 June 2024	10	MF	(Germany) Meritan Shabani	(Croatia) HNK Gorica	Contract expiry	
8 August 2024	17	FW	(Azerbaijan) Renat Dadashov	(Turkey) Ankaragücü	Unknown Fee	
15 August 2024	23	GK	(Switzerland) Nicolas Glaus	(Switzerland) FC Schaffhausen	Loan	
29 October 2024	5	DF	(Australia) Joshua Laws	(Australia) Western Sydney Wanderers	Mutual contract termination	
5 November 2024	–	C	(Switzerland) Marco Schällibaum		Termination	
19 November 2024	–	AC	(France) Aurélien Mioch		Termination	
7 January 2025	14	DF	(France) Théo Ndicka	(Ukraine) Oleksandriya	Mutual contract termination	
7 January 2025	21	MF	(Australia) Awer Mabil	(Spain) CD Castellón	Mutual contract termination	
7 January 2025	27	FW	(Portugal) Asumah Abubakar	(Australia) Brisbane Roar	Mutual contract termination	
7 January 2025	99	FW	(North Macedonia) Dorian Babunski	(Romania) Sepsi OSK	Mutual contract termination	
7 January 2025	73	DF	(Kosovo) Florian Hoxha	(Switzerland) Schaffhausen	Loan	
9 January 2025	4	DF	(Latvia) Kristers Tobers	(Scotland) Aberdeen	£700,000	

== Absences ==
=== Injuries and other Absences ===
Past Ongoing

Start	End	No.	Pos	Player	Reason/Injury	#	Ref.
27 August 2023	15 October 2024	24	DF	(Philippines) Michael Kempter	CL and meniscus injury	9 (Note: Only includes games of the current season)	
1 July 2024	29 October 2024 (Note: Departed the club on 29 October 2024.)	5	DF	(Australia) Joshua Laws	Surgery	13	
20 July 2024	20 August 2024	2	DF	(Netherlands) Dirk Abels	Thigh injury	3	
29 July 2024	23 August 2024	18	FW	(South Korea) Lee Young-jun	Work permit	3	
18 August 2024	9 November 2024	99	FW	(North Macedonia) Dorian Babunski	Adductor tendon injury and surgery	9	
12 September 2024	22 November 2024	27	FW	(Portugal) Asumah Abubakar	Bruised ankle	8	
10 November 2024	21 February 2025	19	MF	(Canada) Mathieu Choinière	Achilles tendon inflammation	9	
24 January 2025	15 March 2025	10	MF	(Switzerland) Giotto Morandi	Pubic bone inflammation	8	
31 January 2025	15 March 2025	27	FW	(France) Bryan Lasme	Unknown injury	7	
1 April 2025	31 May 2025 (Note: Out until the end of the season)	27	FW	(France) Bryan Lasme	Unknown injury	9	
12 April 2025	27 May 2025	7	MF	(Germany) Tsiy-William Ndenge	Knee injury	7	
11 May 2025	31 May 2025	10	MF	(Switzerland) Giotto Morandi	Unknown injury	3	

=== Suspensions ===
Yellow card accumulation Yellow-red card suspension Direct red card suspension

Date	No.	Pos	Player	Note	#	Ref.
19 October 2024	10	MF	(Switzerland) Giotto Morandi	4th yellow card	1	
26 October 2024	6	MF	(Albania) Amir Abrashi	4th yellow card	1	
30 November 2024	20	FW	(France) Evans Maurin	4th yellow card	1	
7 December 2024	4	DF	(Latvia) Kristers Tobers	4th yellow card	1	
20 January 2025	3	DF	(Switzerland) Saulo Decarli	Serious foul play	3	
25 January 2025	6	MF	(Albania) Amir Abrashi	8th yellow card	1	
25 January 2025	7	MF	(Germany) Tsiy-William Ndenge	4th yellow card	1	
10 March 2025	6	MF	(Albania) Amir Abrashi	Denial of a goalscoring opportunity	1	
10 March 2025	3	DF	(Switzerland) Saulo Decarli	4th yellow card	1	
10 March 2025	15	DF	(Japan) Ayumu Seko	4th yellow card	1	
10 March 2025	71	GK	(Switzerland) Justin Hammel	4th yellow card	1	
30 March 2025	22	DF	(Germany) Benno Schmitz	4th yellow card	1	
1 April 2025	26	DF	(Estonia) Maksim Paskotši	4th yellow card	1	
6 April 2025	25	FW	(The Gambia) Adama Bojang	4th yellow card	1	
6 April 2025	66	FW	(Australia) Nestory Irankunda	4th yellow card	1	
12 April 2025	18	FW	(South Korea) Lee Young-jun	4th yellow card	1	
3 May 2025	–	C	(Germany) Tomas Oral	4th yellow card	1	
10 May 2025	17	MF	(Argentina) Tomás Verón Lupi	4th yellow card	1	
10 May 2025	53	MF	(Switzerland) Tim Meyer	4th yellow card	1	
17 May 2025	14	MF	(Benin) Imourane Hassane	Violent conduct	3	

== Test Matches ==
Competition	First match	Last match	Record							
Competition	First match	Last match	Pld	W	D	L	GF	GA	GD	Win %
Pre-season	29 June 2024	13 July 2023	4	1	1	2	3	7	−4	25.00
Mid-season (Autumn)	20 August 2024	5 September 2024	4	2	0	2	12	8	+4	50.00
Winter break	10 January 2025	11 January 2025	2	1	1	0	1	0	+1	50.00
Total			10	4	2	4	16	15	+1	40.00

Last updated: 11 January 2025
Source: Testspiele

=== Pre-season ===
The preparation plan for the upcoming season was announced on 4 June 2024. Pre-season preparation begins on 18 June 2024. A training camp will be held in Crans-Montana, Valais, starting on 1 July and will end with a test game against freshly promoted FC Sion on 5 July 2024. FC Schaffhausen will be hosted for a test match on 29 June 2024 before the training camp. Finally, Grasshoppers will also travel to Vorarlberg for a test match against SC Rheindorf Altach on 13 July 2024. On 20 June 2024, an additional test match against Austria Lustenau was announced, to be held on the GC/Campus on 10 July 2024.

29 June 2024 Pre-season	Grasshopper Club Zurich	1–1	(Switzerland) FC Schaffhausen	Niederhasli, Switzerland
11:00 CEST (UTC+2)	Kamberi 50'	Report	11' De Donno	Stadium: GC/Campus

5 July 2024 Pre-season	FC Sion (Switzerland)	4–0	Grasshopper Club Zurich	Port-Valais, Switzerland
15:30 CEST (UTC+2)		Report		Stadium: Complexe Sportif du Bout du lac

10 July 2024 Pre-season	Grasshopper Club Zurich	2–1	Austria Lustenau	Niederhasli, Switzerland
15:00 CEST (UTC+2)	Muci 36'; Mabil 90' (pen.)	Report	60' Mikić	Stadium: GC/Campus

13 July 2024 Pre-season	SC Rheindorf Altach (Austria)	1–0	Grasshopper Club Zurich	Altach, Austria
17:30 CEST (UTC+2)		Report		Stadium: CASHPOINT Arena

=== Mid-season (autumn) ===
The first mid-season friendly was announced on 15 August 2024, to be held on 20 August 2024, against Bundesliga giants Bayern Munich. It will be the first time these teams meet since 2007. Another friendly match against FC Aarau will be held on 5 September 2024, during the first international break of the season. Neuchâtel Xamax FCS will be hosted for a test match on 10 October 2024, during the second international break of the season. A test match against partner club Wacker Innsbruck, who play in the Tiroler Liga, the fourth tier of the Austrian football pyramid, is scheduled for the final international break of the year.

20 August 2024 Mid-season	Bayern Munich	4–0	Grasshopper Club Zurich	Munich, Germany
11:30 CEST (UTC+2)	Olise 12'; Kane 47'; Tel 68'; Müller 90+1'	GCZ Report; FCB Report		Stadium: FC Bayern Campus; Attendance: 2,500

5 September 2024 Mid-season	Grasshopper Club Zurich	1–2	(Switzerland) FC Aarau	Niederhasli, Switzerland
15:00 CEST (UTC+2)	Ndenge 75'	Report	19' Toure; 89'	Stadium: GC/Campus

10 October 2024 Mid-season	Grasshopper Club Zurich	6–0	(Switzerland) Neuchâtel Xamax FCS	Niederhasli, Switzerland
14:00 CEST (UTC+2)	Lee 13', 22'; Mabil 52'; Schmitz 55'; Bettkober 61'; Bojang 80' (pen.)	Report		Stadium: GC/Campus

14 November 2024 Mid-season	Grasshopper Club Zurich	5–2	(Austria) Wacker Innsbruck	Niederhasli, Switzerland
14:30 CEST (UTC+2)	Mabil 4'; Babunski 10', 25'; Muci 45'; Turhan 62'	Report	5'; 88'	Stadium: GC/Campus

=== Winter ===
On 17 December 2024, the club announced their training plan for the winter break. The team will resume training on 3 January 2025, before departing to Sotogrande, Spain for the training camp between 5 and 12 January 2025. The training camp will be ended with a test match on 11 January 2025. Reigning Austrian champions Sturm Graz will be their opponent. An additional test match was announced on 9 January 2025, to be held on 10 January against SV Elversberg of the 2. Bundesliga.

10 January 2025 Winter Break	SV Elversberg (Germany)	0–0	Grasshopper Club Zurich	Marbella, Spain
16:00 CST (UTC+1)		Report

11 January 2025 Winter Break	SK Sturm Graz (Austria)	0–1	Grasshopper Club Zurich	Marbella, Spain
15:00 CST (UTC+1)		Report	40' Morandi

== Competitions ==
=== Overview ===
Competition	First match	Last match	Starting round	Final position	Record							
Competition	First match	Last match	Starting round	Final position	Pld	W	D	L	GF	GA	GD	Win %
Super League	20 July 2024	24 May 2025	Matchday 1	11th	38	9	12	17	43	53	−10	23.68
Swiss Cup	18 August 2024	3 December 2024	Round 1	Best 16	3	2	0	1	11	1	+10	66.67
Relegation play-off	27 May 2025	30 May 2025	—	—	2	1	0	1	4	1	+3	50.00
Total					43	12	12	19	58	55	+3	27.91

Last updated: 30 May 2025
Source: Spielplan

=== Swiss Super League ===
==== League table ====
Pos	Team	Pld	W	D	L	GF	GA	GD	Pts	Qualification or relegation (Note: Teams play each other three times (33 matches), before the league is split into two groups (the top six and the bottom six).)
8	St. Gallen	38	13	13	12	52	53	−1	52	
9	Sion	38	11	11	16	47	57	−10	44	
10	Winterthur	38	11	7	20	43	68	−25	40	
11	Grasshopper (O)	38	9	12	17	43	53	−10	39	Qualification for the Relegation play-off
12	Yverdon-Sport (R)	38	9	12	17	40	68	−28	39	Relegation to Swiss Challenge League

Source: Swiss Super League
Rules for classification: 1) Points; 2) Goal difference; 3) Goals scored; 4) Head-to-head goal difference; 5) Head-to-head goals scored 6) Away goals scored; 7) Draw.
(O) Play-off winners; (R) Relegated

==== Results Breakdown ====
Competition	First match	Last match	Starting round	Final position	Record							
Competition	First match	Last match	Starting round	Final position	Pld	W	D	L	GF	GA	GD	Win %
Regular Season	20 July 2024	19 April 2025	Matchday 1	10th	33	7	12	14	35	46	−11	21.21
Relegation Group	3 May 2025	22 May 2025	Matchday 34	11th	5	2	0	3	8	7	+1	40.00
Total					38	9	12	17	43	53	−10	23.68

Last updated: 22 May 2025
Source: Spielplan

Home/Away Statistics

Overall								Home						Away					
Pld	W	D	L	GF	GA	GD	Pts	W	D	L	GF	GA	GD	W	D	L	GF	GA	GD
34	5	12	17	43	53	−10	27	1	8	6	28	24	+4	4	4	11	15	29	−14

Last updated: 22 May 2025.
Source: Spielplan

Results by Round

#	1	2	3	4	5	6	7	8	9	10	11	12	13	14	15	16	17	18	19	20	21	22	23	24	25	26	27	28	29	30	31	32	33	34	35	36	37	38
Ground	A	H	H	A	H	A	H	A	A	Z	A	H	A	H	H	Z	H	A	A	H	A	H	A	H	A	H	A	H	Z	A	H	A	H	A	Z	H	A	H
Result	L	D	L	L	W	L	D	W	L	L	L	D	L	L	D	D	D	W	W	D	D	D	D	L	D	W	L	D	L	L	W	W	L	L	L	W	L	W
Position	8	9	11	12	8	9	10	8	9	11	11	11	11	12	12	12	12	11	10	10	11	10	10	11	11	10	11	11	11	11	11	10	10	11	12	10	11	11
Points	0	1	1	1	4	4	5	8	8	8	8	9	9	9	10	11	12	15	18	19	20	21	22	22	23	26	26	27	27	27	30	33	33	33	33	36	36	39

Updated to match(es) played on 22 May 2025. Source: Spielplan
A = Away; H = Home; W = Win; D = Draw; L = Loss; Z = Zürich Derby

==== Results ====
As of 22 May 2025

Win Draw Loss

20 July 2024 1	Lugano	2–1	Grasshopper	Stadio Cornaredo, Lugano
18:00 CEST (UTC+2)	Cimignani (yellow card) 22'; Mai (yellow card) 24'; Przybyłko 61'; Bislimi 90+2' (yellow card) 90+3'	Report	25' (pen.) (yellow card) 56' Morandi; (yellow card) 77' Maurin	Attendance: 3,316; Referee: Urs Schnyder; Assistant referees: Lionel Tschudi (VAR)

27 July 2024 2	Grasshopper	2–2	Luzern	Letzigrund, Zürich
18:00 CEST (UTC+2)	Abrashi (yellow card) 11'; Muci 54' (Ndicka); Schürpf 70' (Mabil); Mabil (yellow card) 80'	Report	(yellow card) 22' Kadák; 42' Villiger; 85' Klidjé; (yellow card) 88' Cigaņiks	Attendance: 5,510; Referee: Luca Piccolo; Assistant referees: Anojen Kanagasingam (VAR)

3 August 2024 3	Grasshopper	0–3	Basel	Letzigrund, Zürich
18:00 CEST (UTC+2)	Schürpf (yellow card) 22'; Tobers (yellow card) 52'; Paskotši (yellow card) 54'; Babunski (yellow card) 75'; Stroscio (yellow card) 90+5'	Report	25' Traoré; 36', 58' Barry	Attendance: 9,099; Referee: Sven Wolfensberger; Assistant referees: Alessandro Dudic (VAR)

11 August 2024 4	St. Gallen	1–0	Grasshopper	Kybunpark, St. Gallen
14:15 CEST (UTC+2)	Milošević 82' (pen.)	Report	(yellow card) 74' Morandi; (yellow card) 81' Seko; (yellow card) 90' Abrashi	Attendance: 18,810; Referee: Lukas Fähndrich; Assistant referees: Luca Cibelli (VAR)

24 August 2024 5	Grasshopper	3–1	Sion	Letzigrund, Zürich
20:30 CEST (UTC+2)	Lee 1'; Tobers 62' (Morandi); Maurin (yellow card) 67'; Ndenge 90'	Report	59' (yellow card) 69' Bua	Attendance: 4,652; Referee: Désirée Grundbacher; Assistant referees: Lionel Tschudi (VAR)

31 August 2024 6	Yverdon-Sport	2–1	Grasshopper	Stade Municipal, Yverdon-les-Bains
18:00 CEST (UTC+2)	Céspedes 49'; Komano 82'	Report	3' (Maurin) Morandi	Attendance: 2,250; Referee: David Huwiler; Assistant referees: Sandro Schärer (VAR)

21 September 2024 7	Grasshopper	2–2	Servette	Letzigrund, Zürich
18:00 CEST (UTC+2)	Choinière 23' (Morandi); Lee 54'; Morandi (yellow card) 72'	Report	34' Kutesa; 45+11' Simbakoli; (red card) 72' Ondoua	Attendance: 4,371; Referee: Tobias Thies/Stefan Horisberger; Assistant referees: Sven Wolfensberger (VAR)
Note: Referee Tobias Thies was replaced by Stefan Horisberger due to injury during the game.

28 September 2024 8	Young Boys	0–1	Grasshopper	Stadion Wankdorf, Bern
20:30 CEST (UTC+2)		Report	4' (Lee) Morandi; (yellow card) 8' Abrashi; (yellow card) 10' Kittel; (yellow card) 72' Lee	Attendance: 26,203; Referee: Urs Schnyder; Assistant referees: Fedayi San (VAR); Man of the Match: Giotto Morandi

5 October 2024 9	Winterthur	1–0	Grasshopper	Schützenwiese, Winterthur
20:30 CEST (UTC+2)	Baroan 87'	Report	(yellow card) 90' Tobers	Attendance: 8,700; Referee: Sandro Schärer; Assistant referees: Fedayi San (VAR)

19 October 2024 10	Grasshopper	1–2	Zürich	Letzigrund, Zürich
18:00 CEST (UTC+2)	Decarli (yellow card) 3'; Tobers (yellow card) 18'; Mabil 61'; Morandi (yellow card) 63'	Report	32' Kamberi; 38' Marchesano; (yellow card) 40' Ligue; (yellow card) 73' Kryeziu	Attendance: 19,223; Referee: Sandro Schärer; Assistant referees: Fedayi San (VAR)

26 October 2024 11	Lausanne-Sport	3–0	Grasshopper	Stade de la Tuilière, Lausanne
18:00 CEST (UTC+2)	Sanches 2'; Mouanga 80'; Dussenne 87' (pen.); Carraco (red card) 90+3'	Report	(yellow card) 28' Meyer; (yellow card) 42' Abrashi; (yellow card) 57' Decarli; (yellow card) 72' Schürpf	Attendance: 4,447; Referee: Johannes von Mandach; Assistant referees: Sandro Schärer (VAR)

31 October 2024 12	Grasshopper	1–1	Lugano	Letzigrund, Zürich
20:30 CET (UTC+1)	Muci 30' (Morandi); Bojang (yellow card) 36'; Lee (yellow card) 68'; Veron Lupi (yellow card) 78'	Report	52' Aliseda	Attendance: 3,641; Referee: David Huwiler; Assistant referees: Sandro Schärer (VAR); Man of the Match: Nikolas Muci

3 November 2024 13	Luzern	2–0	Grasshopper	Swissporarena, Luzern
16:30 CET (UTC+1)	Winkler 8'; Grbić (penalty missed) 56'; Rrudhani 59' (pen.)	Report	(yellow card) 30' Ndenge; (yellow card) 45' Choinière; (yellow card) 64' Abels; (yellow card) 73' Paskotši	Attendance: 11,779; Referee: Johannes von Mandach; Assistant referees: Luca Cibelli (VAR)

10 November 2024 14	Grasshopper	1–2	St. Gallen	Letzigrund, Zürich
16:30 CET (UTC+1)	Paskotši (yellow card) 31'; Abrashi (yellow card) 63'; Morandi 84' (Lee)	Report	26' Diaby; 60' Görtler	Attendance: 5,819; Referee: Fedayi San; Assistant referees: Sandro Schärer (VAR)

23 November 2024 15	Grasshopper	1–1	Winterthur	Letzigrund, Zürich
18:00 CET (UTC+1)	Morandi (yellow card) 32'; Schmitz (yellow card) 33'; Maurin (yellow card) 34'; Seko (yellow card) 65'; Kittel (yellow card) 65'; Muci 78' (Schmitz)	Report	(penalty missed) 67' Burkart; 90+1' Arnold	Attendance: 4,409; Referee: Anojen Kanagasingam; Assistant referees: Sandro Schärer (VAR)

30 November 2024 16	Zürich	1–1	Grasshopper	Letzigrund, Zürich
20:30 CET (UTC+1)	Chouiar 1'; Emmanuel (yellow card) 38' (yellow-red card) 45'	Report	(yellow card) 9' Maurin; (yellow card) 38' Morandi; 41' (Lee) Ndenge; (yellow card) 45+2' Seko; (yellow card) 61' Abrashi; (yellow card) 90+4' Meyer	Attendance: 18,537; Referee: Luca Piccolo; Assistant referees: Nico Gianforte (VAR)

7 December 2024 17	Grasshopper	1–1	Yverdon-Sport	Letzigrund, Zürich
18:00 CET (UTC+1)	Verón Lupi 14' (Ndenge); Kittel (yellow card) 38'; Tobers (yellow card) 88'; Ndenge (yellow card) 90+3'	Report	83' Ntelo; (red card) 90+4' Rodrigues	Attendance: 2,323; Referee: (Finland) Oliver Reitala; Assistant referees: Sandro Schärer (VAR)

14 December 2024 18	Basel	0–1	Grasshopper	St. Jakob-Park, Basel
20:30 CET (UTC+1)		Report	21' (Meyer) Persson; (yellow card) 28' Decarli; (yellow card) 43' Abrashi; (yellow card) 54' Meyer; (yellow card) 56' Lee	Attendance: 23,486; Referee: Luca Piccolo; Assistant referees: Mirel Turkes (VAR); Man of the Match: Noah Persson

Winter Break

18 January 2024 19	Sion	0–1	Grasshopper	Stade de Tourbillon, Sion
18:00 CET (UTC+1)		Report	(red card) 4' Decarli; 64' (yellow card) 78' Verón Lupi; (yellow card) 68' Hammel	Attendance: 8,200; Referee: Lionel Tschudi; Assistant referees: Nico Gianforte (VAR); Man of the Match: Tsiy-William Ndenge

25 January 2025 20	Grasshopper	0–0	Young Boys	Letzigrund, Zürich
18:00 CET (UTC+1)	Bojang (penalty missed) 48'; Abrashi (yellow card) 65'	Report		Attendance: 5,135; Referee: Luca Piccolo; Assistant referees: Luca Cibelli (VAR)

1 February 2025 21	Servette	1–1	Grasshopper	Stade de Genève, Genève
20:30 CET (UTC+1)	Kutesa 55'	Report	(yellow card) 72' Schmitz; 86' (Verón Lupi) Muci	Attendance: 7,628; Referee: Désirée Grundbacher; Assistant referees: Urs Schnyder (VAR); Man of the Match: Ayumu Seko

4 February 2025 22	Grasshopper	2–2	Lausanne-Sport	Letzigrund, Zürich
20:30 CET (UTC+1)	Muci (yellow card) 59' (goal) 79' (Schmitz); Turhan 64' (Irankunda); Schmitz (yellow card) 67'; Verón Lupi (penalty missed) 78'	Report	29' Sanches; 85' Oviedo	Attendance: 2,589; Referee: Nico Gianforte; Assistant referees: Stefan Horisberger (VAR); Man of the Match: Nikolas Muci

8 February 2025 23	Lugano	1–1	Grasshopper	Stadio Cornaredo, Lugano
18:00 CET (UTC+1)	Papadopoulos 86'	Report	7' (Irankunda) (yellow card) 41' Maurin	Attendance: 3,165; Referee: Lukas Fähndrich; Assistant referees: Urs Schnyder (VAR); Man of the Match: Justin Hammel

16 February 2025 24	Grasshopper	1–2	Servette	Letzigrund, Zürich
16:30 CET (UTC+1)	Ndenge 28' (pen.) (yellow card) 64'; Irankunda (yellow card) 39'	Report	76' Stevanović; 79' Rouiller	Attendance: 3,653; Referee: Luca Piccolo; Assistant referees: Mirel Turkes (VAR); Man of the Match: Nestory Irankunda

25 February 2025 25	Lausanne-Sport	2–2	Grasshopper	Stade de la Tuilière, Lausanne
18:00 CET (UTC+1)	Sanches 13'; Oviedo 90+6'	Report	(yellow card) 45' Abels; 55' (Irankunda), 60' (Seko) Bojang; (yellow card) 90+2' Hammel	Attendance: 5,644; Referee: Désirée Grundbacher; Assistant referees: Michèle Schmölzer (VAR)

2 March 2025 26	Grasshopper	1–0	Young Boys	Letzigrund, Zürich
16:30 CET (UTC+1)	Kittel 49' (Bojang); Abels (yellow card) 89'	Report		Attendance: 6,039; Referee: Mirel Turkes; Assistant referees: Fedayi San (VAR); Man of the Match: Sonny Kittel

8 March 2025 27	St. Gallen	3–1	Grasshopper	Kybunpark, St. Gallen
20:30 CET (UTC+1)	Geubbels 16', 57' (pen.); Witzig 66'; Nsamé (penalty missed) 88'	Report	(red card) 16' Abrashi; 35' (pen.) Kittel; (yellow card) 35' Irankunda; (yellow card) 45+4' Bojang; (yellow card) 55' Decarli; (yellow card) 77' Hammel; (yellow card) 85' Seko; (yellow card) 86' Persson; (yellow card) 87' Kuttin	Attendance: 18,887; Referee: Anojen Kanagasingam; Assistant referees: Stefan Horisberger (VAR)

16 March 2025 28	Grasshopper	1–1	Sion	Letzigrund, Zürich
14:15 CET (UTC+1)	Irankunda (yellow card) 37'; Bojang (yellow card) 45'; Muci 90+4' (Schmitz); Persson (yellow card) 90+7'	Report	45+2' Kololli; (red card) 71' Lavanchy	Attendance: 4,071; Referee: Lionel Tschudi; Assistant referees: Johannes von Mandach (VAR)

30 March 2025 29	Grasshopper	1–2	Zürich	Letzigrund, Zürich
16:30 CET (UTC+1)	Choinière (yellow card) 51'; Verón Lupi (yellow card) 70'; Bojang 82' (Morandi); Schmitz (yellow card) 90+4'	Report	45+2' Gbamin; 68' Krasniqi	Attendance: 21'497; Referee: Luca Cibelli; Assistant referees: Mirel Turkes (VAR)

3 April 2025 30	Basel	2–1	Grasshopper	St. Jakob-Park, Basel
20:30 CEST (UTC+2)	Schmid 16'; Otele 40'	Report	(yellow card) 51' Paskotši; (yellow card) 57' Hassane; 70' (pen.) Morandi; (yellow card) 89' Hammel	Attendance: 21,705; Referee: Fedayi San; Assistant referees: Luca Piccolo (VAR)

6 April 2025 31	Grasshopper	3–1	Luzern	Letzigrund, Zürich
16:30 CEST (UTC+2)	Adama Bojang 14', 55' (Schmitz), 72' (Verón Lupi) (yellow card) 83'; Irankunda (yellow card) 43'	Report	54' Dorn	Attendance: 6,342; Referee: Sven Wolfensberger; Assistant referees: Michèle Schmölzer (VAR); Man of the Match: Adama Bojang

12 April 2025 32	Yverdon-Sport	1–2	Grasshopper	Stade Municipal, Yverdon-les-Bains
18:00 CEST (UTC+2)	Piccini 33' (pen.)	Report	11' (Morandi) Paskotši; (yellow card) 45+3' Hassane; (yellow card) 56' Seko; (yellow card) 57' Lee; 78' (Morandi) Schürpf	Attendance: 3,600; Referee: Urs Schnyder; Assistant referees: Lukas Fähndrich (VAR)

19 April 2025 33	Grasshopper	0–1	Winterthur	Letzigrund, Zürich
18:00 CEST (UTC+2)	Seko (yellow card) 41'; Irankunda (yellow card) 90+5'	Report	48' Burkart	Attendance: 10,137; Referee: Luca Cibelli; Assistant referees: Sandro Schärer (VAR)

Split

3 May 2025 34	Winterthur	2–0	Grasshopper	Schützenwiese, Winterthur
18:00 CEST (UTC+2)	Lukembila 47'; Lüthi 53'	Report	(yellow card) 60' Oral	Attendance: 8,700; Referee: Lionel Tschudi; Assistant referees: Luca Piccolo (VAR)

10 May 2025 35	Zürich	3–0	Grasshopper	Letzigrund, Zürich
18:00 CEST (UTC+2)	Tsawa 18'; Markelo 22'; Reverson 85'	Report	(yellow card) 33' Meyer; (yellow card) 74' Bettkober; (yellow card) 82' Verón Lupi	Attendance: 17,797; Referee: Sandro Schärer; Assistant referees: Fedayi San (VAR)

14 May 2025 36	Grasshopper	5–0	Yverdon-Sport	Letzigrund, Zürich
20:30 CEST (UTC+2)	Kittel 7' (Bojang), 40' (Schmitz); Bojang (yellow card) 12'; Abels 45+3' (Abrashi); Hassane (yellow card) 54'; Muci (yellow card) 69'; Kabashi 79' (Muci); Irankunda 82' (Lee)	Report	(yellow card) 2' (yellow-red card) 5' Tavares	Attendance: 4,266; Referee: Fedayi San; Assistant referees: Lukas Fähndrich (VAR); Man of the Match: Sonny Kittel

17 May 2025 37	Sion	2–1	Grasshopper	Stade de Tourbillon, Sion
20:30 CEST (UTC+2)	Kolloli 56', 60'	Report	(red card) 90' Hassane; 90+5' Verón Lupi	Attendance: 12,000; Referee: Luca Piccolo; Assistant referees: Fedayi San (VAR)

22 May 2025 38	Grasshopper	2–0	St. Gallen	Letzigrund, Zürich
20:30 CEST (UTC+2)	Muci 12' (Verón Lupi); Lee 69' (Abrashi)	Report	(red card) 82' Vallci	Attendance: 7,913; Referee: Anojen Kanagasingam; Assistant referees: Alessandro Dudic (VAR)

=== Relegation Play-off ===
27 May 2025	Grasshopper Club Zürich	4–0	FC Aarau	Stadio Cornaredo, Lugano
20:30 CEST (UTC+2)	Young-jun 14' (Schmitz); Schürpf 41' (Verón Lupi); Verón Lupi (yellow card) 49'; Kuttin (yellow card) 76'; Muci 79' (Schmitz); Seko 86' (pen.)	Report		Attendance: 3,800; Referee: Urs Schnyder; Assistant referees: Lukas Fähndrich (VAR)
Note: Grasshoppers's home game will be played in Lugano, due to the Letzigrund being unavailable on the dates of the play-off.

30 May 2025	FC Aarau	1–0	Grasshopper Club Zürich	Stadion Brügglifeld, Aarau
20:30 CEST (UTC+2)	Obexer 82'	Report		Attendance: 8,450; Referee: Sandro Schärer; Assistant referees: Fedayi San (VAR)

Grasshopper Club Zürich wins 4–1 on aggregate

=== Swiss Cup ===
As of 3 December 2024

Win Draw Loss

Opponent's league indicated in brackets.

18 August 2024 Round of 64	FC Regensdorf (Canton of Zurich)	0–9	Grasshopper Club Zürich	Wisacher, Regensdorf
16:00 CEST (UTC+1)		Report	6' (Mabil), 11' (Mabil), 30' (Mabil) Schürpf; 33' (Mabil) Morandi; 35', 39' (Ndenge), 59' (de Carvalho) Mabil; (penalty missed) 53' 72' (Mabil) Babunski; 65' (Abrashi) Meyer	Attendance: 3,120; Referee: Marijan Drmic

13 September 2024 Round of 32	FC Thun (Canton of Bern)	0–2	Grasshopper Club Zürich	Stockhorn Arena, Thun
20:00 CEST (UTC+1)		Report	34' (Persson) Kittel; 83' (Morandi) Muci	Attendance: 4,200; Referee: Sven Wolfensberger

3 December 2024 Round of 16	Grasshopper Club Zürich	0–1	(Canton of Zurich) FC Zürich	Letzigrund, Zürich
20:00 CET (UTC+1)		Report	71' Kryeziu	Referee: Fedayi San; Assistant referees: Lionel Tschudi (VAR)

== Awards ==
=== Fan Awards ===
Player of the Month
July: (Switzerland) Nikolas Muci
August: (South Korea) Lee Young-jun
September: (Switzerland) Giotto Morandi
October: (Switzerland) Tim Meyer
November: (Germany) Tsiy-William Ndenge
December: (Sweden) Noah Persson
January: (Argentina) Tomás Verón Lupi
February: (Australia) Nestory Irankunda
March: (Switzerland) Justin Hammel
