= Noah Persson =

Swedish footballer

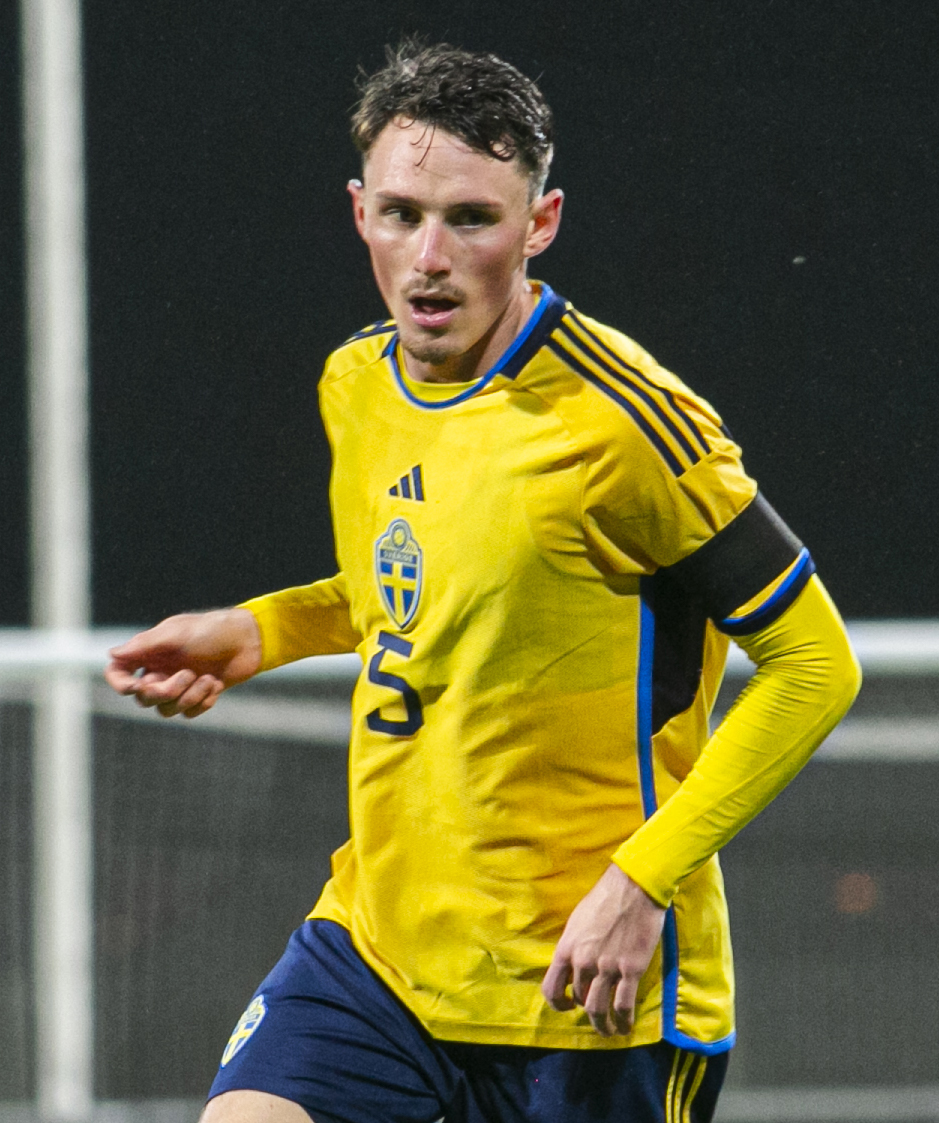
- Persson with Sweden U21 in 2023

Personal information
- Full name: Noah Karl Anders Persson
- Date of birth: 16 July 2003 (age 23)
- Height: 1.84 m (6 ft 0 in)
- Position: Left-back

Team information
- Current team: Hammarby IF
- Number: 16

Youth career
- –2018: Asarums IF
- 2019–2021: Mjällby AIF

Senior career*
Years	Team	Apps	(Gls)
2021–2023	Mjällby AIF	39	(1)
2023–2025	Young Boys	25	(0)
2023	→ Mjällby AIF (loan)	10	(0)
2024–2025	→ Grasshopper (loan)	29	(1)
2025–	Hammarby IF	28	(3)

International career^{‡}
2022–2024	Sweden U21	14	(0)
2023	Sweden	1	(0)
- * Club domestic league appearances and goals as of 7 November 2026 ‡ National team caps and goals as of 16:58, 16 October 2024 (UTC)

Noah Karl Anders Persson (born 16 July 2003) is a Swedish professional footballer who plays as a left-back for Hammarby IF in the Allsvenskan.

== Club career ==
Noah Persson's childhood club is Asarums IF. As a 15-year-old, he made the move to Mjällby AIF.

Shortly after his 18th birthday, he made his Allsvenskan debut in Mjällby AIF, when he made an appearance as a full-back in the 2-2 match against Örebro SK on 7 August 2021. Later that month, Persson signed a first team contract with Mjällby AIF.

On 7 February 2023 Persson was sold to Swiss club BSC Young Boys for an undisclosed 'double digit million fee' which makes Persson the most expensive player ever sold by Mjällby. Persson was than loaned back to Mjällby until May 2023.

On 2 September 2024, he was loaned to fellow Swiss Super League side Grasshopper Club Zürich for the rest of the 2024–25 season. He debuted on 13 September 2024, in a 2–0 victory in the Swiss Cup against FC Thun, where he supplied the assist for the first goal. He scored his first goal for Grasshoppers on 14 December 2024, scoring the only goal in a 0–1 away win against FC Basel, thus earning him a Man of the Match nomination. It was also his first goal scored since he moved to Switzerland. He returned to Young Boys at the end of the season.

== International career ==
Persson made his full international debut for Sweden on 9 January 2023, playing for 90 minutes in a friendly 2–0 win against Finland.

== Career statistics ==
=== Club ===
As of 31 May 2025

Appearances and goals by club, season and competition
Club	Season	League			Cup		Continental		Other		Total	
Club	Season	Division	Apps	Goals	Apps	Goals	Apps	Goals	Apps	Goals	Apps	Goals
Mjällby	2021	Allsvenskan	10	0	0	0	—		—		14	0
Mjällby	2022	Allsvenskan	29	1	3 (Note: Appearances in the Svenska Cupen)	0	—		—		20	1
Mjällby (loan)	2023	Allsvenskan	10	0	6	0	—		—		16	0
Mjällby (loan)	Total		49	1	9	0	0	0	0	0	58	1
Young Boys	2023–24	Swiss Super League	25	0	2 (Note: Appearances in the Swiss Cup)	0	6 (Note: Five appearances in UEFA Champions League, one appearance in UEFA Europa League)	0	—		33	0
Young Boys	2024–25	Swiss Super League	5	0	0	0	2 (Note: Appearances in UEFA Champions League qualifying)	0	—		7	0
Grasshopper (loan)	2024–25	Swiss Super League	29	1	1	0	—		2 (Note: Appearances in the relegation playoff)	0	32	1
Career total			108	2	12	0	8	0	2	0	130	2

=== International ===
As of 14 December 2023

Appearances and goals by national team and year
National team	Year	Apps	Goals
Sweden	2023	1	0
Total		1	0

== Honours ==
Young Boys

- Swiss Super League: 2023–24
