= Grayson Dettoni =

American soccer player (born 2005)

Personal information
- Full name: Grayson Winter Dettoni
- Date of birth: June 29, 2005 (age 21)
- Place of birth: Manassas, Virginia, United States
- Height: 1.95 m (6 ft 5 in)
- Position: Defender

Team information
- Current team: Darmstadt 98
- Number: 4

Youth career
- McLean Youth Soccer
- –2015: San Diego Surf
- 2015–2017: 1860 Munich
- 2017–2023: Bayern Munich

Senior career*
Years	Team	Apps	(Gls)
2023–2026	Bayern Munich II	45	(0)
2025	→ Grasshopper (loan)	0	(0)
2025	→ Grasshopper II (loan)	6	(0)
2026	→ Darmstadt 98 (loan)	2	(0)
2026–	Darmstadt 98	0	(0)
2026–	Darmstadt 98 II	1	(0)
- * Club domestic league appearances and goals as of October 10, 2026

Grayson Winter Dettoni (born June 29, 2005) is an American professional soccer player who plays as a defender for 2. Bundesliga club Darmstadt 98.

== Early life ==
Dettoni was born in Manassas, Virginia, United States, and started playing soccer at the age of four. He moved to California at a young age. Dettoni then moved to Germany at the age of ten after his father relocated his company to Munich, Germany.

== Club career ==
=== Bayern Munich ===
As a youth player, Dettoni moved from San Diego Surf and joined the youth academy of German side 1860 Munich in 2015, two years later, in 2017 he joined the youth academy of German Bundesliga side Bayern Munich. In 2024, he extended his contract with the club until 2026, along with Vincent Manuba and Maximilian Schuhbauer.

On August 13, 2024, Dettoni was called up with the Bayern Munich senior team as an unused substitute for their last friendly match of the 2024–25 pre-season, a 3–0 win against Austrian Bundesliga club WSG Tirol.

He was called up with the Bayern Munich senior team for a friendly match after the 2024 winter break concluded, on January 6, 2025, in which he substituted Eric Dier at the 63rd minute of a 6–0 win over Austrian Bundesliga club Red Bull Salzburg.

==== Loan to Grasshopper ====
On January 28, 2025, Dettoni joined Grasshopper Club Zurich of the Swiss Super League on loan for one year. On 1 August 2025, his loan was terminated early and he returned to Bayern Munich II. In his time in Zurich, he made no appearances for the Grasshopper first team and only played six matches with the reserves.

==== Loan to Darmstadt 98 ====
On January 31, 2026, he joined 2. Bundesliga club Darmstadt 98 on a six-month loan until the end of the 2025–26 season. Dettoni made his debut with Darmstadt 98, substituting Fabian Holland at the second half of a 2–1 away loss 2. Bundesliga match against Karlsruher SC, on 3 May 2026.

=== Darmstadt 98 ===
On May 28, 2026, he permanently joined Darmstadt 98, ahead of the 2026–27 season.

== International career ==
Dettoni has been called up with the United States under-19 and under-20 teams, but he is yet to make his international debut.

== Career statistics ==
=== Club ===
As of May 10, 2026

Appearances and goals by club, season and competition
Club	Season	League			National cup		Other		Total	
Club	Season	Division	Apps	Goals	Apps	Goals	Apps	Goals	Apps	Goals
Bayern Munich II	2023–24	Regionalliga Bayern	17	0	—		—		17	0
Bayern Munich II	2024–25	Regionalliga Bayern	19	0	—		—		19	0
Bayern Munich II	2025–26	Regionalliga Bayern	9	0	—		—		9	0
Bayern Munich II	Total		45	0	—		—		45	0
Grasshopper (loan)	2024–25	Swiss Super League	0	0	—		—		0	0
Grasshopper II (loan)	2024–25	1. Liga Classic	6	0	—		—		6	0
Darmstadt 98 (loan)	2025–26	2. Bundesliga	2	0	—		—		2	0
Career total			53	0	0	0	0	0	53	0

== Style of play ==
He mainly operates as a center-back and is known for his strength, Dettoni has received a few comparisons to Germany international Niklas Süle.

== Personal life ==
Dettoni holds Italian passport, making him eligible to play for Italy as well as his native United States.
