= Michael Henke =

German football player and coach

Personal information
- Date of birth: 27 April 1957 (age 69)
- Place of birth: Büren, West Germany
- Height: 1.86 m (6 ft 1 in)
- Position: Midfielder

Youth career
- 1964–1975: SV 21 Büren

Senior career*
Years	Team	Apps	(Gls)
1975–1978	1. FC Paderborn		
1978–1980	Teutonia Lippstadt		
1980–1983	SG Wattenscheid	69	(1)
1983–1986	TuS Paderborn Neuhaus		
1986–1988	FC Gütersloh		

Managerial career
- 1988–1989: FC Gütersloh
- 2005: 1. FC Kaiserslautern
- 2006: 1. FC Saarbrücken
- 2013: FC Ingolstadt (caretaker)
- 2016–2017: FC Ingolstadt 04 (caretaker)
- 2018: Shanghai Shenhua (caretaker)
- 2019–2021: FC Ingolstadt 04 (CEO)
- 2022–2023: Arminia Bielefeld (caretaker)
- 2024–2025: Grasshopper Club Zurich (assistant)
- * Club domestic league appearances and goals

Michael Henke (born 27 April 1957) is a German football coach and a former player. His most notable post was managing 1. FC Kaiserslautern in the 2005–06 season for 14 games. He has spent much of his career working as assistant to Ottmar Hitzfeld. After spending the 2009 season with Köln, Henke moved to Iran in order to become Esteghlal's coach for the 2011–12 season. He was reunited with his former player, Ferydoon Zandi, whom he signed to Kaiserslautern back in 2005. On 15 August 2012, he became Aston Villa's head of European scouting.

On 19 November 2024, he was appointed as the assistant coach of Grasshopper Club Zurich's new head coach Tomas Oral. He departed Grasshoppers on 24 June 2025, following the end of the season.

== Career statistics ==
As of 20 January 2014

Team	From	To	Record					
Team	From	To	G	W	D	L	Win %	Ref.
Borussia Dortmund II	1 July 1992	30 June 1994	–					
1. FC Kaiserslautern	1 July 2005	19 November 2005	15	4	3	8	26.67	
1. FC Saarbrücken	1 July 2006	30 October 2006	15	4	6	5	26.67	
FC Ingolstadt 04	30 September 2013	6 October 2013	1	1	0	0	100.00	
Total			31	9	9	13	29.03	–
