= Maksim Paskotši =

Estonian footballer (born 2003)

Personal information
- Full name: Maksim Paskotši
- Date of birth: 19 January 2003 (age 23)
- Place of birth: Tallinn, Estonia
- Height: 1.88 m (6 ft 2 in)
- Position: Centre-back

Team information
- Current team: KAA Gent
- Number: 3

Youth career
- 2011–2013: SK Everest Tallinn
- 2014–2017: Tallinna Kalev
- 2018–2020: Flora
- 2020–2023: Tottenham Hotspur

Senior career*
Years	Team	Apps	(Gls)
2018–2020	Flora II	31	(0)
2020	Flora	0	(0)
2020–2023	Tottenham Hotspur	0	(0)
2023–2025	Grasshoppers	55	(2)
2025–	Gent	27	(4)

International career^{‡}
2018	Estonia U16	4	(0)
2019	Estonia U17	11	(1)
2021–	Estonia	46	(3)
- * Club domestic league appearances and goals as of 25 October 2026 ‡ National team caps and goals as of 16 November 2026

Maksim Paskotši (born 19 January 2003) is an Estonian professional footballer who plays as a centre-back for Belgian Pro League club KAA Gent and the Estonia national team.

== Club career ==
Paskotši made his senior debut for FC Flora on the 20 June 2020, starting as a central defender in the 4–2 Estonian Cup victory against FC Elva. He joined English club Tottenham Hotspur for an undisclosed fee on 21 September 2020. On 19 August 2021, Paskotši made his debut for Tottenham by coming on as a substitute in the inaugural UEFA Europa Conference League competition against Paços de Ferreira, which ended in a 1–0 defeat.

On 6 September 2023, Paskotši officially joined Swiss side Grasshoppers on a permanent deal, signing a three-year contract. In the process, he became the club's first ever Estonian player. On 12 April 2025, he scored the opening goal in a 2–1 win away against Yverdon-Sport, his first for the Swiss record champions.

On 4 August 2025, he transferred to Belgian Pro League side KAA Gent for an undisclosed fee, just two days after scoring his second goal for Grasshoppers. He joined Gent with a contract until 2029. He started in his first match on 9 August 2025 against Royale Union Saint-Gilloise and scored a stoppage time header, the final goal in the 2–3 home defeat. He finished the season with 22 appearances and 4 goals, as Gent finished 5th in the league and qualified for the 2026–27 UEFA Conference League.

== International career ==
Paskotši made his international debut for Estonia on 24 March 2021 in a 2022 FIFA World Cup qualification match against the Czech Republic.

He was part of the Estonian side that won the 2020 Baltic Cup (played in 2021 due to restrictions caused by the COVID-19 pandemic).

On 4 June 2024, he captained the national team in a friendly against Switzerland.

He scored his first international goal on 22 March 2025, in a 1–2 loss to Israel in their opening game of the 2026 FIFA World Cup qualification.

== Career statistics ==
=== Club ===
As of 25 October 2026

Appearances and goals by club, season and competition
Club	Season	League			National Cup (Note: Includes Estonian Cup and Swiss Cup)		League Cup		Continental		Other		Total	
Club	Season	Division	Apps	Goals	Apps	Goals	Apps	Goals	Apps	Goals	Apps	Goals	Apps	Goals
Flora	2020	Meistriliiga	0	0	1	0	—		0	0	—		1	0
Flora	2021	Meistriliiga	0	0	1	0	—		0	0	—		1	0
Flora	Total		0	0	2	0	0	0	0	0	0	0	2	0
Tottenham Hotspur U21	2021–22	–									1 (Note: Appearance(s) in the EFL Trophy)	0	10	0
Tottenham Hotspur	2021–22	Premier League	0	0	0	0	0	0	1 (Note: Appearance(s) in the UEFA Europa Conference League)	0	—		1	0
Tottenham Hotspur	2022–23	Premier League	0	0	0	0	0	0	0	0	—		0	0
Tottenham Hotspur	Total		0	0	0	0	0	0	1	0	0	0	1	0
Grasshopper	2023–24	Swiss Super League	28	0	0	0	—		—		1 (Note: Includes Super League relegation play-offs)	0	29	0
Grasshopper	2024–25	Swiss Super League	25	1	3	0	—		—		2	0	30	1
Grasshopper	2025–26	Swiss Super League	2	1	0	0	—		—		—		2	1
Grasshopper	Total		55	2	3	0	0	0	0	0	3	0	61	2
Gent	2025–26	Belgian Pro League	22	4	3	0	—		—		—		25	4
Gent	2026–27	Belgian Pro League	5	0	1	0	—		4	0	—		10	0
Gent	Total		27	4	4	0	—		4	0	—		35	4
Career total			82	6	9	0	0	0	5	0	4	0	100	6

=== International ===
As of match played 16 November 2026

Appearances and goals by national team and year
National team	Year	Apps	Goals
Estonia	2021	11	0
Estonia	2022	5	0
Estonia	2023	8	0
Estonia	2024	9	0
Estonia	2025	7	1
Estonia	2026	6	2
Total		46	3

Scores and results list Estonia's goal tally first, score column indicates score after each Paskotši goal.

List of international goals scored by Maksim Paskotši
No.	Date	Venue	Cap	Opponent	Score	Result	Competition
1	22 March 2025	Nagyerdei Stadion, Debrecen, Hungary	34	Israel	1–0	1–2	2026 FIFA World Cup qualification
2	26 September 2026	Laugardalsvöllur, Reykjavik, Iceland	41	Iceland	1–1	1–1	2026–27 UEFA Nations League C
3	13 November 2026	Stade de Luxembourg, Luxembourg City, Luxembourg	45	Luxembourg	1–0	1–0	2026–27 UEFA Nations League C

== Honours ==
Estonia

- Baltic Cup: 2020
