= Maximilian Schuhbauer =

German footballer (born 2006)

Personal information
- Date of birth: 3 February 2006 (age 20)
- Place of birth: Dachau, Germany
- Positions: Full-back; wing-back; wide midfielder; winger

Team information
- Current team: SV Wacker Burghausen
- Number: 37

Youth career
- –2019: TaF Glonntal
- 2019–2025: Bayern Munich

Senior career*
Years	Team	Apps	(Gls)
2023–2026	Bayern Munich II	20	(2)
2026–	SV Wacker Burghausen	11	(1)
- * Club domestic league appearances and goals as of 7 November 2026

Maximilian Schuhbauer (born 3 February 2006) is a German professional footballer who plays as a full-back, wing-back, wide midfielder and winger for Regionalliga Bayern club SV Wacker Burghausen.

== Club career ==
Schuhbauer is a youth product of TaF Glonntal, later moving to the youth academy of Bayern Munich in 2019 at the age of 13.

On 17 January 2024, while still playing with the Bayern Munich U19, he signed a contract extension with the club until 2026, along with Bayern Munich II players Vincent Manuba and Grayson Dettoni.

Schuhbauer received his first call-up with Bayern Munich II during the 2023–24 season on 10 November 2023, coming off the bench at the second half of a 1–1 home draw Regionalliga Bayern match against Würzburger Kickers, as an unused substitute however.

He made his professional debut with Bayern Munich II on 18 October 2025, during a 3–1 away win Regionalliga Bayern match against TSV Aubstadt. The following month, Schuhbauer scored his first professional goal during a 5–1 home win Regionalliga Bayern match against Viktoria Aschaffenburg, on November 8.

After his contract with Bayern Munich expired, he signed with Regionalliga Bayern club SV Wacker Burghausen as a free agent, on 11 August 2026, ahead of the 2026–27 season.

== Career statistics ==
As of match played 16 May 2026

Appearances and goals by club, season and competition
Club	Season	League			Cup		Total	
Club	Season	Division	Apps	Goals	Apps	Goals	Apps	Goals
Bayern Munich II	2023–24	Regionalliga Bayern	0	0	—		0	0
Bayern Munich II	2025–26	Regionalliga Bayern	20	2	—		20	2
Bayern Munich II	Total		20	2	—		20	2
Career Total			20	2	0	0	20	2
