= Giuseppe Morello (footballer) =

Swiss-Italian footballer (born 1985)

Personal information
- Full name: Giuseppe Morello
- Date of birth: 12 October 1985 (age 41)
- Place of birth: Allschwil, Switzerland
- Height: 1.73 m (5 ft 8 in)
- Position: Forward

Team information
- Current team: Grasshopper Club Zürich

Senior career*
Years	Team	Apps	(Gls)
2004–2009	FC Concordia Basel	67	(15)
2009–2010	FC Biel/Bienne	13	(13)
2010–2011	BSC Young Boys	1	(0)
2010	→ FC Thun (loan)	15	(2)
2011–2015	FC Biel/Bienne	36	(18)
2015	BSC Old Boys	3	(2)
2015–2017	FC Basel II	37	(9)

Managerial career
- 2017–2021: FC Basel U15
- 2018–2022: Switzerland U21 (assistant)
- 2021–2022: FC Basel U18
- 2022–2024: Young Boys (assistant)
- 2024–2025: Grasshopper (assistant)
- 2024: Grasshopper (caretaker)
- * Club domestic league appearances and goals as of 10 July 2012

Giuseppe Morello (born 12 October 1985) is a former Swiss-Italian footballer.

On 19 June 2024, he joined Grasshopper Club Zürich as assistant coach of Marco Schällibaum. Following Schällibaum's dismissal on 5 November 2024, he took over as caretaker. Two weeks later, on 19 November 2024, he returned to his role as assistant coach to the incoming head coach Tomas Oral. On 24 June 2025, he departed Grasshoppers.
