= Tomás Verón Lupi =

Argentine footballer

Personal information
- Full name: Tomás Verón Lupi
- Date of birth: 3 September 2000 (age 26)
- Place of birth: Quilmes, Argentina
- Height: 1.73 m (5 ft 8 in)
- Position: Forward

Team information
- Current team: Nacional (on loan from Grasshopper)
- Number: 27

Youth career
- Escuelas Crinar
- 2014–2018: Quilmes

Senior career*
| Years | Team | Apps | (Gls) |
| 2018–2023 | Quilmes | 6 | (0) |
| 2020–2021 | → Sacachispas (loan) | 37 | (9) |
| 2022 | → Racing de Montevideo (loan) | 24 | (0) |
| 2023–2025 | Racing de Montevideo | 60 | (10) |
| 2024–2025 | → Grasshopper (loan) | 25 | (3) |
| 2025– | Grasshopper | 5 | (0) |
| 2026– | → Nacional | 0 | (0) |

International career
| 2018 | Argentina U19 | | |
- * Club domestic league appearances and goals as of 17:28, 4 January 2026 (UTC)

Tomás Verón Lupi (born 3 September 2000) is an Argentine professional footballer who plays as a winger for Liga AUF Uruguaya club Nacional, on loan from Swiss Super League club Grasshopper.

== Club career ==
Verón Lupi is a product of Quilmes' youth system, having signed in 2014 after a stint with Escuelas Crinar. He made the move into senior football under the guidance of Marcelo Fuentes, who selected the forward off the bench in a Primera B Nacional fixture with Platense on 30 September 2018. Five more appearances arrived in the first part of 2018–19, all of which were as a substitute.

On 5 September 2024, two days after his 24th birthday, he traveled to Switzerland to join Grasshopper on loan for the 2024–25 season. He scored his first goal for the Swiss record champions on 7 December 2024, with the opening goal of a 1–1 draw at home against Yverdon-Sport. He scored his second on 18 January 2025, a stunning flick to win Grasshopper the away game at Sion. On 30 January 2025, he was voted by the fans as the best Grasshopper player of January 2025. On 25 June 2026, Grasshopper activated their option to sign him on a three-year contract.

In January 2026, he returned to Uruguay, joining reigning champions Nacional on loan for the entirety of 2026.

== International career ==
Verón Lupi has received call-ups from Argentina's U19s; notably scoring in a friendly against Shandong Luneng U21s in April 2018. He was also selected to train with Sebastián Beccacece's U20s.

== Career statistics ==
As of 31 December 2025.

Appearances and goals by club, season and competition
| Club | Season | League | | | Cup | | Continental | | Other | | Total | |
| Club | Season | Division | Apps | Goals | Apps | Goals | Apps | Goals | Apps | Goals | Apps | Goals |
|---|---|---|---|---|---|---|---|---|---|---|---|---|
| Quilmes | 2018–19 | Primera B Nacional | 6 | 0 | 0 | 0 | — | | — | | 6 | 0 |
| Racing Club (loan) | 2022 | Uruguayan Segunda División | 23 | 0 | 1 | 0 | — | | 1 (Note: Appearance in the Turneo Competencia Final) | 0 | 25 | 0 |
| Racing Club | 2023 | Uruguayan Primera División | 37 | 7 | 1 | 0 | — | | — | | 38 | 7 |
| Racing Club | 2024 | Uruguayan Primera División | 23 | 4 | 1 | 0 | 9 (Note: Appearances in the 2024 Copa Sudamericana) | 5 | — | | 33 | 9 |
| Racing Club | Total | | 83 | 11 | 3 | 0 | 9 | 5 | 1 | 0 | 96 | 16 |
| Grasshopper (loan) | 2024–25 | Swiss Super League | 25 | 3 | 0 | 0 | — | | 2 (Note: Appearances in the relegation playoff) | 0 | 27 | 3 |
| Grasshopper | 2025–26 | Swiss Super League | 5 | 0 | 1 | 0 | – | | – | | 6 | 0 |
| Grasshopper | Total | | 30 | 3 | 1 | 0 | 0 | 0 | 2 | 0 | 33 | 3 |
| Career total | | | 119 | 14 | 4 | 0 | 9 | 5 | 3 | 0 | 135 | 19 |
