= Vincent Manuba =

German footballer (born 2005)

Personal information
- Full name: Vincent Ugo Manuba
- Date of birth: 1 July 2005 (age 21)
- Place of birth: Gräfelfing, Germany
- Height: 1.83 m (6 ft 0 in)
- Positions: Full-back; winger; wide midfielder; wing-back

Team information
- Current team: Bayern Munich II

Youth career
- –2016: SV Planegg-Krailling
- 2016–2024: Bayern Munich

Senior career*
| Years | Team | Apps | (Gls) |
| 2023– | Bayern Munich II | 59 | (0) |
| 2025– | Bayern Munich | 0 | (0) |

International career^{‡}
| 2021–2022 | Germany U17 | 8 | (0) |
- * Club domestic league appearances and goals as of 7 November 2026 ‡ National team caps and goals as of 25 May 2022

Vincent Ugo Manuba (born 1 July 2005) is a German professional footballer who plays as a full-back, winger, wide midfielder and wing-back for Regionalliga Bayern club Bayern Munich II. He is a former German youth international.

== Club career ==
=== Bayern Munich ===
As a youth player, Manuba started his career with the youth academy of SV Planegg-Krailling, and later joined the youth academy of Bundesliga side Bayern Munich in 2016.

He received his first call-up with Bayern Munich II on 21 July 2023, as an unused substitute during a 3–3 away draw on a Regionalliga Bayern match against SV Wacker Burghausen. Manuba made his professional debut one month later on 25 August, coming off the bench for Bayern Munich II during a 1–1 home draw Regionalliga Bayern match against SV Schalding-Heining.

On 17 January 2024, Bayern Munich extended his contract with the club until 2026, along with Grayson Dettoni and Maximilian Schuhbauer.

He was listed as part of the Bayern Munich's senior team squad for the 2025–26 UEFA Champions League. On 22 October 2025, Manuba received his first call-up with the Bayern Munich senior team for the 4–0 victory over Belgian Pro League club Club Brugge in the UEFA Champions League, as an unused substitute however.

== International career ==
Born in Geramny, Manuba holds dual German and Algerian nationality. He has represented Germany at the under-17 level.

== Career statistics ==
As of match played 7 November 2026

Appearances and goals by club, season and competition
| Club | Season | League | | | Cup | | Continental | | Total | |
| Club | Season | Division | Apps | Goals | Apps | Goals | Apps | Goals | Apps | Goals |
|---|---|---|---|---|---|---|---|---|---|---|
| Bayern Munich II | 2023–24 | Regionalliga Bayern | 22 | 0 | — | | — | | 22 | 0 |
| Bayern Munich II | 2024–25 | Regionalliga Bayern | 8 | 0 | — | | — | | 8 | 0 |
| Bayern Munich II | 2025–26 | Regionalliga Bayern | 18 | 0 | — | | — | | 18 | 0 |
| Bayern Munich II | 2026–27 | Regionalliga Bayern | 11 | 0 | — | | — | | 11 | 0 |
| Bayern Munich II | Total | | 59 | 0 | — | | — | | 59 | 0 |
| Bayern Munich | 2025–26 | Bundesliga | 0 | 0 | 0 | 0 | 0 | 0 | 0 | 0 |
| Bayern Munich | Total | | 0 | 0 | 0 | 0 | 0 | 0 | 0 | 0 |
| Career Total | | | 59 | 0 | 0 | 0 | 0 | 0 | 59 | 0 |
