= Nicolas Glaus =

Swiss footballer (born 2002)

Personal information
- Full name: Nicolas Roger Glaus
- Date of birth: 10 May 2002 (age 24)
- Place of birth: Binningen, Switzerland
- Height: 1.87 m (6 ft 2 in)
- Position: Goalkeeper

Team information
- Current team: Grasshopper
- Number: 1

Youth career
- 2017–2020: Basel

Senior career*
Years	Team	Apps	(Gls)
2020–2021	Basel II	3	(0)
2021–2023	VfB Stuttgart II	20	(0)
2023–2026	Grasshopper	1	(0)
2023–2025	Grasshopper II	24	(0)
2024–2025	→ FC Schaffhausen	4	(0)
2026–	Oberhausen	7	(0)

International career^{‡}
2023	Switzerland U20	1	(0)
- * Club domestic league appearances and goals as of 23 September 2026 ‡ National team caps and goals as of 15:10, 15 June 2022 (UTC)

Nicolas Roger Glaus (born 10 May 2002) is a Swiss professional footballer who plays as a goalkeeper for Regionalliga West club Rot-Weiß Oberhausen.

== Club career ==
=== VfB Stuttgart II ===
A youth product of FC Basel, he joined German Bundesliga side VfB Stuttgart on 7 September 2021, where he will play for their reserve team. In his first season, he managed to impress and soon became a regular starter for the Stuttgart reserves, making ten appearance sin the Regionalliga Südwest, the fourth tier of German football. As a result, his contract was extended for a further year on 12 April 2022.

=== Grasshopper Club Zürich ===
On 19 June 2023, he returned to Switzerland, joining Swiss Super League side Grasshopper Club Zürich. He officially joins the first team as third goalkeeper and will primarily play for the reserves. On 15 August 2024, he was loaned to FC Schaffhausen, in the Swiss Challenge League until the end of 2024, to gain experience playing in the first team. At the same time, he extended his contract with Grasshoppers for a further year. On 8 January 2025, his loan spell was extended until the end of the season. This loan was ended prematurely on 3 February, "due to disagreements". Glaus merely played four games for Schaffhausen, conceding eight goals.

In the following season, he was promoted to the first team as backup goalkeeper. He played his first match for the senior team on 17 August 2025, in the first round of the Swiss Cup against FC Lachen, where he kept a clean sheet in the 2–0 victory. He also played the Cup quarter-final game against FC Sion and was instrumental in the 4–3 comeback victory. He played his league debut match on the final matchday of the 2025–26 season, in a 3–1 away victory against FC Lausanne-Sport. He departed Grasshoppers at the end of the season.

=== RW Oberhausen ===
On 21 July 2026, he joined RW Oberhausen in the Regionalliga West, the fourth tier of German football.

== International career ==
He joined the Switzerland U20 on 1 March 2023. He gave his debut on 28 March 2023 in a friendly against Denmark U21.
