= Evans Maurin =

French footballer (born 2001)

Personal information
- Date of birth: 30 March 2001 (age 25)
- Place of birth: Charenton-le-Pont, France
- Position: Forward

Team information
- Current team: Casa Pia
- Number: 17

Youth career
- Drancy

Senior career*
Years	Team	Apps	(Gls)
2020–2022	Chiasso	30	(17)
2023–2024	Yverdon-Sport	16	(2)
2024–2025	Grasshopper	15	(1)
2025–2026	Grenoble	22	(3)
2026–	Casa Pia	3	(0)
- * Club domestic league appearances and goals as of 13:30, 25 October 2026 (UTC)

Evans Maurin (born 30 March 2001) is a French professional footballer who plays as a forward for Portuguese club Casa Pia.

He spent five years in Switzerland, and played in the Swiss Super League with Yverdon-Sport and Grasshopper. He was part of the Yverdon squad that won promotion as champions of the Swiss Challenge League in 2022–23.

== Career ==
Born in Charenton-le-Pont, Maurin played as a youth for Drancy before joining Swiss club Chiasso on a three-year deal in October 2020. In the third-tier Promotion League, he scored 17 goals in 28 games in 2021–22; his hat-trick on 16 April in a 4–2 win away to Cham secured a play-off place.

On 9 February 2023, Maurin joined Yverdon-Sport in the second-tier Swiss Challenge League on a contract until June 2025. After the team won promotion to the Swiss Super League as champions, he scored in his first two games in the top flight; on 30 July 2023 he came on as an 82nd-minute substitute and scored the equaliser in a 2–2 draw at home to Young Boys, and a week later he came off the bench again and scored the winning goal in added time of a 2–1 win away to Lausanne-Sport.

Having not added any more goals for Yverdon, Maurin signed on 1 July 2024 for Grasshopper on a contract of undisclosed length. In 17 games over all competitions for the club from Zurich, he scored once on 8 February in the seventh minute of a 1–1 draw away to Lugano.

On 27 August 2025, 24-year-old Maurin signed a three-year contract at Grenoble of Ligue 2, his first experience of senior football in his country. Including one game in the Coupe de France, he played 23 games in his first season, rarely starting and scoring three goals. New manager Olivier Frapolli did not call him up for any squads at the start of the 2026–27 season.

Maurin headed abroad again on 29 August 2026, signing a three-year deal at Casa Pia in the Primeira Liga in Portugal.

== Honours ==
Yverdon-Sport

- Swiss Challenge League: 2022–23
