= Nikolas Muci =

Swiss footballer (born 2003)

Personal information
- Full name: Nikolas Marcel Cristiano Muci
- Date of birth: 8 February 2003 (age 23)
- Place of birth: Lenzburg, Switzerland
- Height: 1.80 m (5 ft 11 in)
- Position: Forward

Team information
- Current team: Grasshopper
- Number: 9

Youth career
- 2011: FC Riva
- 2011–2014: Mendrisio
- 2014–2021: Lugano

Senior career*
Years	Team	Apps	(Gls)
2021–2022	Lugano U21	20	(13)
2021–2024	Lugano	10	(0)
2022–2024	→ Wil (loan)	67	(19)
2024–	Grasshopper	57	(10)
2026	→ Mantova (loan)	2	(0)

International career^{‡}
2019	Switzerland U16	4	(2)
2019	Switzerland U17	1	(0)
2021	Switzerland U19	6	(1)
2022–2023	Switzerland U20	4	(0)
2023–2024	Switzerland U21	10	(2)
- * Club domestic league appearances and goals as of 8 August 2026 ‡ National team caps and goals as of 15 October 2024

Nikolas Marcel Cristiano Muci (born 8 February 2003) is a Swiss professional footballer who plays as a forward for Swiss Super League club Grasshopper.

== Professional career ==
Muci made his professional debut with Lugano in a 2–1 Swiss Super League win over FC Luzern on 21 May 2021. On 1 June 2021, he signed a four-year contract with Lugano until 2025.

On 23 June 2022, Muci moved on a two-year loan to Wil. During his time at Wil, he established himself as an important player, making 72 appearances and scoring 20 goals in his two year loan spell.

On 28 June 2024, he signed for Swiss Super League record champions Grasshopper Club Zürich on a three-year deal for an undisclosed fee. In the first game of the season, on 20 July 2024, he was nominated in the starting lineup, against his former club Lugano, no less. On 27 July 2024, he scored the 1–1 equalizer against FC Luzern, in a match that would eventually end 2–2. It was his first goal for Grasshoppers and his first ever goal in the Swiss top flight, in only his second start for his new team and third overall in the Super League. As a result, he was voted by the fans as the best Grasshopper player of July 2024.

On 3 February 2026, he moved to Italy to join Mantova on loan for the rest of the season. The loan deal also included an option to join the struggling Serie B side permanently.

== International career ==
He is a youth international for Switzerland, having represented the Switzerland U16, U17, U20, and U21. He scored two goals in the U21's U21 Euro qualification campaign.

== Personal life ==
Born in Switzerland, Muci holds Swiss, Italian and German passports. Muci is of German descent through his mother. His brother, Alexander, is also a professional footballer in Switzerland.

== Honours ==
Lugano

- Swiss Cup: 2021–22
