= Tomas Oral =

German football manager of FC Ingolstadt (born 1973)

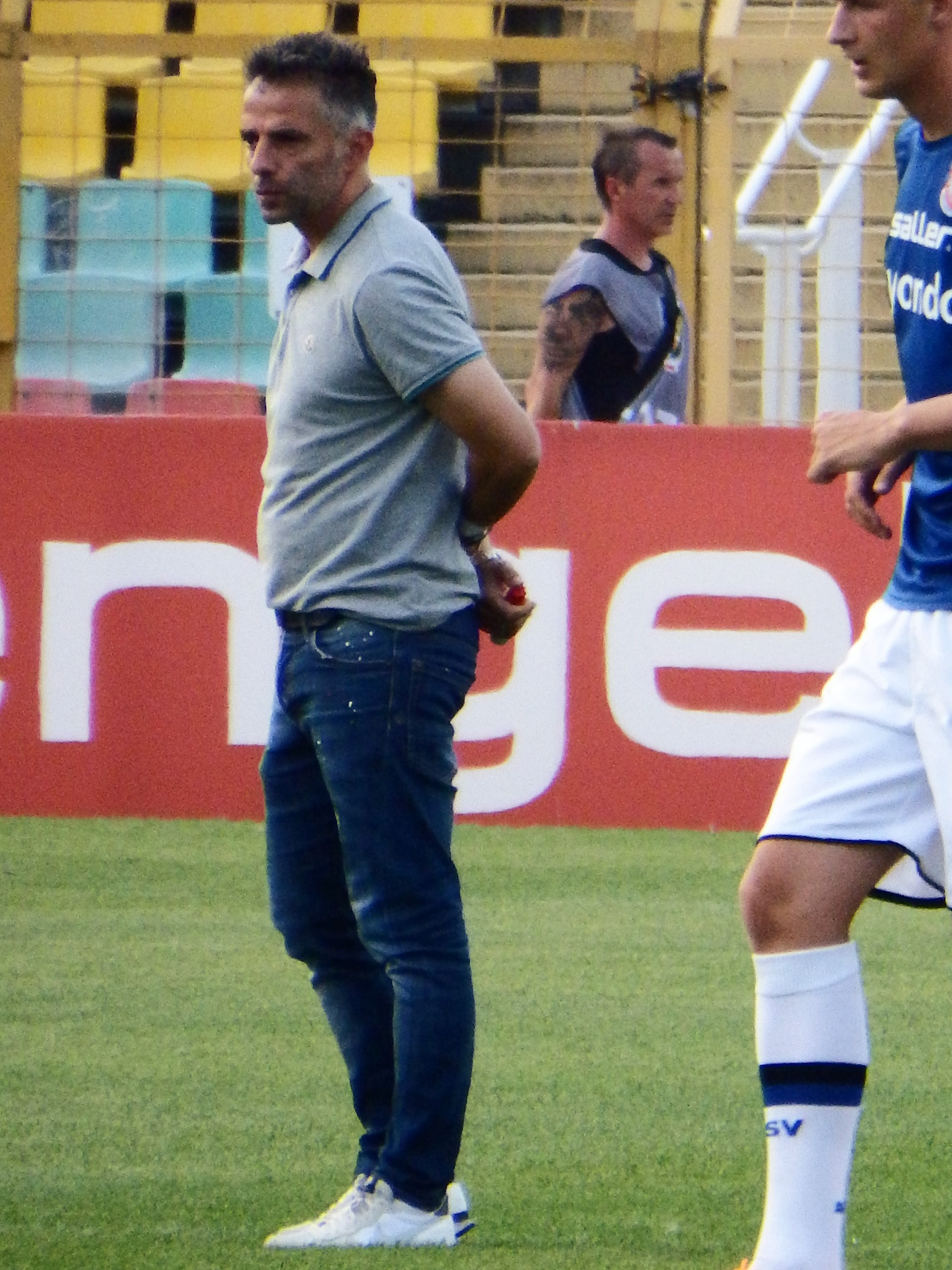
- Oral with FSV Frankfurt in 2015

Personal information
- Date of birth: 24 April 1973 (age 53)
- Place of birth: Ochsenfurt, West Germany
- Position: Midfielder

Senior career*
Years	Team	Apps	(Gls)
1994–1997	SG Egelsbach		
1997–1999	Viktoria Aschaffenburg		
1999–2000	Germania Horbach		
2000–2006	FSV Frankfurt		

Managerial career
- 2003–2006: FSV Frankfurt II
- 2006–2009: FSV Frankfurt
- 2010–2011: RB Leipzig
- 2011–2013: FC Ingolstadt
- 2015–2016: FSV Frankfurt
- 2016: Karlsruher SC
- 2019: FC Ingolstadt
- 2020–2021: FC Ingolstadt
- 2023: SV Sandhausen
- 2024–2025: Grasshopper Club Zurich
- * Club domestic league appearances and goals

Tomas Oral (born 24 April 1973) is a German football manager. He was most recently the head coach of Swiss Super League side Grasshopper Club Zurich.

== Managerial career ==
=== Early career (2006–2011) ===
Oral was hired as head coach for FSV Frankfurt prior to the 2006–07 season. His debut was a 2–0 win against 1. FC Schwalmstadt in the Hessenliga. He would finish the season in first place; losing only one match. The only loss of the season came on matchday 30 against Viktoria Aschaffenburg. The club's first-place finish meant promotion to the Regionalliga Süd. During the 2007–08 season, Frankfurt defeated the reserve team of 1860 München, drew against the reserve team of Bayern Munich, and recorded a pair of draws against the reserve team of VfB Stuttgart. Again, Frankfurt finished in first place and were promoted. During the 2008–09 season, Frankfurt played in the 2. Bundesliga and German Cup. Frankfurt started the season with a 2–0 win against VfL Osnabrück in the German Cup. However, they went winless in their first four league matches of the season. They were knocked out of the German Cup in the second round after losing 1–0 to Carl Zeiss Jena. Frankfurt finished the season in 15th place; two points above the relegation playoff spot. To start the 2009–10 season, Frankfurt was knocked out of the German Cup by Borussia Mönchengladbach. Oral resigned on 5 October 2009. Frankfurt were in 17th place at the time of his resignation. He finished with a record of 53 wins, 31 draws, and 29 losses.

Oral was head coach of RB Leipzig between 18 June 2010 and 28 May 2011. Leipzig started the season with a nine–match undefeated streak. He finished the season in fourth place. He finished with a record of 18 wins, 10 draws, and six losses.

=== 2011–2016 ===
Oral was hired by FC Ingolstadt on 10 November 2011. His first match was a 1–0 loss to 1860 Munich on 18 November 2011. He would go on to win only one of his first eight matches as the new head coach. The only win during that stretch was against FC St. Pauli. However, starting from that victory, Ingolstadt went on a 14–match undefeated streak which included wins over Hansa Rostock, SC Paderborn 07, VfL Bochum, and Karlsruher SC. The streak ended after a 4–1 loss to 1860 Munich. Ingolstadt finished the 2011–12 season in 12th place. The following season, Ingolstadt finished in 13th place. Oral and Ingolstadt parted ways as of 30 June 2013. His final match was a 3–0 loss to 1. FC Köln on 19 May 2013. He finished with a record of 16 wins, 22 draws, and 17 losses.

On 18 May 2015, Oral replaced Benno Möhlmann at FSV Frankfurt with a match left in the 2014–15 season. The team was in 16th place when Oral was hired. The match against 1. FC Kaiserslautern finished in a 1–1 draw and Frankfurt jumped up to 13th place. During the 2015–16 season, Frankfurt defeated Dynamo Berlin and lost to Hertha BSC in the German Cup. In the league, Frankfurt started the season with a three–match winless streak. Frankfurt results were mixed up to the winter break. Frankfurt lost to Arminia Bielefeld on matchday 19, immediately prior to the winter break. At this point, Frankfurt dropped down to 14th place in the league table. He was sacked on 10 April 2016 after losing 4–1 to VfL Bochum. Frankfurt were in 14th place when he was sacked. He finished with a record of nine wins, eight draws, and 15 losses.

Oral was appointed as the head coach of Karlsruher SC on 8 March 2016 for the start of the 2016–17 season. His first match was a 0–0 draw against Arminia Bielefeld on 7 August 2016. Oral was sacked on 4 December 2016. His final match was a 2–1 loss to Greuther Fürth on 2 December 2016. Karlsruhe were in 16th place at the time Oral was sacked. Oral finished with a record of two wins, six draws, and eight losses.

=== 2019 ===
He returned to Ingolstadt on 3 April 2019. After the season, Oral left Ingolstadt.

=== 2020 ===
On 11 March 2020, he once again returned to Ingolstadt. Even though they got promoted to the 2. Bundesliga, his contract was not renewed for the 2021–22 season.

=== 2023 ===
In February 2023, he was named the new head coach of SV Sandhausen. After just six games, he was sacked on 10 April 2023.

=== 2024 ===
On 19 November 2024, he was announced as the new head coach of struggling Swiss record champions Grasshopper Club Zurich. At the time of his appointment, the team was sitting in last place of the Swiss Super League with just nine points in 13 games. He was quickly able to stabilize the team and successfully avoided relegation, albeit by winning the relegation play-off against FC Aarau with a 4–1 aggregate score. On 21 June 2025, Grasshoppers announced that they would not be extending his contract past the end of the season.

== Managerial record ==
As of 30 May 2025

Team	From	To	Record								
Team	From	To	M	W	D	L	GF	GA	GD	Win %	Ref.
FSV Frankfurt	1 July 2006	5 October 2009	113	53	31	29	178	118	+60	46.90	
RB Leipzig	18 June 2010	28 May 2011	34	18	10	6	57	29	+28	52.94	
FC Ingolstadt	10 November 2011	30 June 2013	55	16	22	17	60	68	−8	29.09	
FSV Frankfurt	18 May 2015	10 April 2016	32	9	8	15	34	53	−19	28.13	
Karlsruher SC	1 July 2016	4 December 2016	16	2	6	8	12	23	−11	12.50	
FC Ingolstadt	3 April 2019	30 June 2019	9	6	1	2	21	12	+9	66.67	
FC Ingolstadt	11 March 2020	30 June 2021	55	28	14	13	83	60	+23	50.91	
SV Sandhausen	20 February 2023	10 April 2023	6	0	2	4	4	14	−10	0.00	
Grasshopper Club Zurich	19 November 2024	30 June 2025	27	8	9	10	34	31	+3	29.63	
Total			347	140	103	104	483	408	+75	40.35	—
